= Edgar Allan Guzman =

Filipino actor, singer, host and model

EA Guzman
- Born: Edgar Allan Guzman; November 20, 1989 (age 36); Pasig, Philippines
- Occupations: Actor; singer; host; model
- Years active: 2006–present
- Agents: Talent5 (2010–2014); Star Magic (2014–2017); Sparkle (2019–present); ALV Talent Circuit (2019–present)
- Height: 5 ft 9 in (1.75 m)
- Title: Prince of Philippine Independent Films
- Spouse: Shaira Diaz (m. 2025)

Edgar Allan Guzman (born November 20, 1989), also known by his nickname and screen name EA Guzman, is a Filipino actor, singer, host, model, and entrepreneur.

He gained popularity after winning the Mr. Pogi 2006 competition on Eat Bulaga!, aired on GMA Network. He stayed with the network from 2006 to 2008 before establishing his career on TV5. In 2014, he transferred to ABS-CBN along with Maxene Magalona. Guzman has also worked in independent films, earning the title "Prince of Philippine Independent Films," a designation previously associated with Coco Martin. In 2017, he returned to GMA Network for the series My Korean Jagiya and later signed a contract in 2019.

== Personal life ==
Guzman began a relationship with actress Shaira Diaz in 2013. They got engaged in December 2021. (Note: Publicly recognized in February 2024) The couple revealed that they have practiced celibacy or sexual abstinence throughout their relationship until they get married. They got married on August 14, 2025, in a ceremony held at St. Benedict Parish in Silang, Cavite. The couple later opened their branch of Baa Baa Thai Tea, a beverage business, in BF International Village, Las Piñas.

== Filmography ==
=== Film ===
Year	Title	Role
2008	I.T.A.L.Y.	Gadoy Pinlac
2008	Scaregivers	
2008	Ikaw pa rin: Bongga ka boy!	
2009	Ante	
2009	Astig (Squalor)	Boy
2011	Magdamag	
2011	Trespassers	
2011	Ligo na Ü, Lapit na Me	Intoy
2011	Shake, Rattle & Roll 13	Nante Gomez
2012	Unofficially Yours	Kelvin
2012	I Do Bidoo Bidoo: Heto nAPO Sila!	Cameo
2012	Si Agimat, si Enteng Kabisote at si Ako	Gasoline Boy
2013	Ang Huling Henya	Mark Alvarez
2014	Starting Over Again	Baba
2014	My Illegal Wife	Brian
2016	Working Beks	Champ
2017	Tatlong Bibe	Elmo
2017	Love You to the Stars and Back	JP
2017	Deadma Walking	Mark
2019	Man and Wife	Totoy
2020	Mia	Jay Policarpio

=== Television ===
Year	Title	Role
2006–08	Eat Bulaga!	Himself
2007	Teens	Himself
2007–08	Daisy Siete: Ulingling	Various Roles
2008	Daisy Siete: Prince Charming and the Seven Maids	Aaron
2008	Daisy Siete: Vaklushii	Various Roles
2009	Daisy Siete: My Shuper Sweet Lover	Various Roles
2009	Maalaala Mo Kaya: Sulo	Ted
2010	Habang May Buhay	Henson
2010	5 Star Specials	Episode: "Bigti"
2011	Maalaala Mo Kaya: Kape	Rico
2011	Regal Shocker: Piano	Joseph
2011	Fan*tastik	Himself / Performer
2011	Rod Santiago's The Sisters	Jimmy
2011	Sa Ngalan ng Ina	Angelo Deogracias
2012	Maalaala Mo Kaya: School Uniform	Joel
2012	Maalaala Mo Kaya: Bangkang Papel	Ritche
2012	Hey it's Saberdey!	Himself / Host / Performer
2012	Lokomoko	Various Roles
2012	Isang Dakot Na Luha	Miguel
2012–13	Enchanted Garden	Molave
2012–13	Game 'N Go	Himself / Host
2013	Never Say Goodbye	Troy Mendez
2013–14	Tropa Mo Ko Unli	Various Roles
2014	Tropa Mo Ko Nice Di Ba?!	Various Roles
2014	Maalaala Mo Kaya: Sulat	Nick
2014	Ipaglaban Mo: Buong Tapang Na Lalaban	Glen
2014	Hawak Kamay	Anton Dela Rama
2015	Maalaala Mo Kaya: Korona III	Jing / Jinky
2015	Oh My G!	Vaughn Luna
2015	Your Face Sounds Familiar	Himself / Contestant
2015	Maalaala Mo Kaya: Box	Joey
2015	Kapamilya, Deal or No Deal	Himself / Player with Maxene Magalona
2015–17	Doble Kara	Edward Ligaya
2015; 2023–present	It's Showtime	Himself / Guest Performer
2015	Ipaglaban Mo: Ilalaban ang Dangal	Ricky
2016	Tonight with Boy Abunda	Himself / Guest (January 8)
2016	Ipaglaban Mo: Silakbo	Baste
2017	Maalaala Mo Kaya: Sulat	Rico
2017	Ikaw Lang ang Iibigin	Young Rigor
2017	Maalaala Mo Kaya: Kulungan	Rustom
2017	Ipaglaban Mo: Abuso	Lando
2017	Unang Hirit	Himself / Guest
2017	Tadhana: Lihim	Paolo
2017–18	My Korean Jagiya	Ryan Maalba
2017	Sunday PinaSaya	Himself / Guest
2017	Dear Uge: Let's Talk About Ex Baby	Arjay
2017	Wish Ko Lang	Guest Episode
2017	All Star Videoke	Himself / Player
2018	The Stepdaughters	Froilan Almeda†
2018	Eat Bulaga	Himself / Guest
2018	Tadhana: Escort si Tatay	Arman
2018	Dear Uge: Si yaya madrama	Josh
2018	Wish Ko Lang: Katahimikan ni Leonora	Jojo
2018	Maalaala Mo Kaya: Mata	Michael
2019	Eat Bulaga: BOOM!	Himself / Guest
2019	Dear Uge: Martyr-a 'ng matibay	Joko
2019	Dragon Lady	Goldwyn Chen†
2019–20	One of the Baes	Charles Altamirano†
2019	Tunay na Buhay	Himself
2020	Tadhana: Swap	Bobby
2020	Magpakailanman: Dapat ka bang mahalin?	Jerome
2020	Dear Uge: Happy Never After / Konsumisyon sa reception	Brad
2020	Magpakailanman: My Gay Husband	VJ
2020	Tadhana: The One That Ran Away Part 1 / 2	Carlo
2021	Dear Uge: Wife for Hire Part 1 / 2	Pax
2021	Heartful Café	Uno Ynares
2021	Pepito Manaloto: Ang Unang Kwento	Fernando Generoso
2021–present	All-Out Sundays	Himself / Performer
2021	Agimat ng Agila	Julian
2022	Widows' Web	Frank Querubin
2022–23	Nakarehas na Puso	Miro Galang
2023–present	Bubble Gang	Himself As Comedian
2024–25	Lilet Matias: Attorney-at-Law	Kurt Ignacio

=== Theater ===
Year	Title	Role
2012	Bona	Gardo

== Awards and nominations ==
Year	Award	Nominated for	Result
2010	Gawad PASADO Awards	Pinakapasadong Actor for Astig	Nominated
2011	Balanghai Trophy	Best Actor – New Breed Full-Length Feature for Ligo na Ü Lapit na Me.	Won
2012	German Moreno Youth Achievement Award		Won
2012	Golden Screen Award	Best Performance by an Actor in a Leading Role (Musical or Comedy) for Ligo na Ü Lapit na Me (tied with Mart Escudero for Remington and the Curse of the Zombadings).	Won
2014	Golden Screen TV Awards	Outstanding Performance by an Actor in a Single Drama/Telemovie Program for Maalaala Mo Kaya: Bankang Papel.	Nominated
2017	Metro Manila Film Festival 2017	Best Supporting Actor for Deadman Walking.	Won
