= Tropa Mo Ko Unli =

2013–15 Philippine television sketch comedy show

- Title card
- Also known as: Tropa Mo Ko Unli Spoof
- Genre: Sketch
- Created by: TV5 Entertainment Group
- Written by: Rolf Mahilom; Dan Salamante
- Directed by: Monti Parungao
- Starring: Various
- Country of origin: Philippines
- Original language: Filipino
- No. of episodes: 93

Production
- Executive producer: Toni Rose delos Santos
- Production locations: TV5 Media Center, Mandaluyong
- Running time: 1 hour

Original release
- Network: TV5
- Release: September 14, 2013 – July 4, 2015

Related
- Tropang Trumpo; Lokomoko; Sunday 'Kada

Tropa Mo Ko Unli Spoof (formerly known as Tropa Mo Ko Unli and Tropa Mo Ko Nice di ba?) is a Philippine television sketch comedy show broadcast by TV5. It aired from September 14, 2013 to July 4, 2015, replacing Lokomoko and Tropang Kulit and was replaced by LolaBasyang.com. The title is a merger between Tropang Trumpo and Lokomoko U, resulting in Ogie Alcasid's return/arrival to TV5.

Launched on September 14, 2013, Tropa Mo Ko Unli is one of the 8 newly launched weekend programs under the "Weekend Do It Better" block of the network.

The show had its first revamp in June 2014 which resulted to the program's renaming as "Tropa MoKo Nice Diba?!" and the second one that led to the new season as "Tropa MoKo Unli Spoof" in January 2015. The show was ended on July 4, 2015.

== Segments ==
=== Parodies ===
- Amazing Rice Philippines - parody of TV5's reality competition show Amazing Race Philippines
- Anino & Abundat Tonight - parody of the ABS-CBN's primetime talk show Aquino & Abunda Tonight
- Balitang Dos Siyete Singko - parody of AksyonTV's former newscast, Balitang 60
- Battle of the Brainless - parody of defunct RPN quiz game show "Battle Of The Brains" (original parody segment from Tropang Trumpo)
- Beking News - spoof newscast using gay lingo
- Binoy Big Brother All In Edition - parody of the ABS-CBN's reality show Pinoy Big Brother: All In
- Chef Boy Lagro: Kusina Monster - parody of GMA's cooking show, Chef Boy Logro: Kusina Master
- High Iskul Bukol Musical - a combined parody of Disney's High School Musical & IBC and TV5's sitcom, Iskul Bukol
- Magandang Gaboom, Beki! - parody of the ABS-CBN's Saturday defunct current affairs program Magandang Gabi... Bayan
- Kapag Nasa Katwiran, Ibaklaan Mo! - parody of the ABS-CBN legal drama Ipaglaban Mo!
- ShoShow A. All the Way - parody of TV5's comedy talk show Jojo A. All The Way!
- Sarap Diba? - parody of GMA's cooking show Sarap Diva
- The Laysa Mae Toyo Show - parody of GMA's talk show The Ryzza Mae Show
- The Lethal Wife - combined parody of the 2014 ABS-CBN drama The Legal Wife
- Terry Third Eye - combined parody of Terry Third Thursday and 2012 TV5 horror and suspense series Third Eye
- Maria Brazo de Mercedes - parody of ABS-CBN telenovela Maria Mercedes
- Walang Relasyon - parody of Radyo5 92.3 News FM and AksyonTV's program Relasyon

=== Original segments ===
- Chaka Diaries
- Paminta 101 - (starring Vin Abrenica, Ogie Alcasid, Alwyn Uytingco and Edgar Allan Guzman)
- PatawaRin
- Poke-Pokan
- Gandumb and Gandumber
- Watch Next?

=== Recurring characters ===
- Ryan Secret - Parody of American Idol host and AT40 Radio DJ Host Ryan Seacrest, played by Ogie Alcasid
- Williard A-Cheng - Parody of ABS-CBN News correspondent Williard Cheng, played by Edgar Allan Guzman
- Chef Boy Lagro - Parody of Chef Boy Logro, played by Ogie Alcasid
- Laysa Mae Toyo - Parody of Ryzza Mae Dizon, played by Ogie Alcasid
- Alvin Elchika - Parody of ABS-CBN Newscaster Alvin Elchico, played by Ogie Alcasid
- Anthony Imbiyerna - Parody of ABS-CBN Newscaster & Host Anthony Taberna, played by Alwyn Uytingco
- Derek Randy - Parody of TV5 host and actor Derek Ramsay, played by Ogie Alcasid
- Kuya Biik - Parody of Roderick "Kuya Dick" Paulate, played by Ogie Alcasid
- Amy Bisaya - Combined parody of Amy Perez & Amay Bisaya, played by Gelli de Belen
- Ted Fantalon - Parody of ABS-CBN Newscaster Ted Failon, played by Edgar Allan Guzman
- Papa Bench - Parody of Bitag host Ben Tulfo, played by Alwyn Uytingco
- Loyd De Bora - Parody of TV5 host & reporter Lourd de Veyra
- Dyosa Ka Soco - Parody of GMA newscaster Jessica Soho, played by Ritz Azul
- Guys Amoygas - Parody of ABS-CBN reporter and host Gus Abelgas, played by Long Mejia
- Atty. Gel Kanta Maria - Parody of Radyo5 92.3NewsFM's Relasyon host Dean Mel Sta. Maria, played by Ogie Alcasid
- Tootchie Luz-Valdez - Parody of News5 chief Luchi Cruz-Valdez, played by Gelli de Belen
- Bruno Dacuycoy - Parody of Bruno Mars, played by Long Mejia with several skits
- Doris Bigote - Parody of ABS-CBN News Reporter Doris Bigornia, played by Empoy Marquez
- Etching Pulido - Parody of ABS-CBN Showbiz News Reporter Gretchen Fullido, played by Eula Caballero
- Vickie Moreorless - Parody of GMA Newscaster & Reporter Vicky Morales, played by Gelli De Belen
- Boy Abundo - Parody of ABS-CBN variety talk show Boy Abunda, played by (unknown)

== Cast ==
=== Main cast members ===
- Alwyn Uytingco
- Ogie Alcasid
- Eula Caballero
- Empoy Marquez
- Long Mejia
- Tuesday Vargas

=== Extended cast members ===
- Artista Academy top scholars
- Vin Abrenica
- Sophie Albert
- Chanel Morales
- Akihiro Blanco
- Shaira Diaz
- Mark Neumann
- Alberto Bruno
- Benjo Leoncio
- Malak So Shdifat
- Brent Manzano
- Jon Orlando
- Nicole Estrada
- Stephanie Rowe

=== Special guests ===
- John Lapus
- Kim Idol
- Martin Escudero
- Bianca King
- Bayani Agbayani
- Bearwin Meily
- Mahal

=== Former casts ===
- Wendell Ramos
- Edgar Allan Guzman
- Caloy Alde
- Chanel Morales
- Valeen Montenegro
- Dianne Medina
- Mark Neumann
- Joey Paras
- Ritz Azul
- Gelli de Belen
- Vin Abrenica

== Awards ==
- Best Comedy/Gag Show - 12th Gawad Tanglaw Awards

== See also ==
- TV5
- List of TV5 (Philippine TV network) original programming
- List of Philippine television shows
