= Lokomoko =

2008–13 Philippine television sketch comedy show

- Genre: Sketch comedy
- Written by: Jennifer Academia; Arthur Archacoso; Christopher Borja; Raymund Roland Navarro; Jovany Ponce; Rodel Raval; Dan Salamante; Wado Siman
- Directed by: Al Tantay
- Starring: See Lokomoko U casts
- Opening theme: "Lokomoko U" by Blanktape
- Composer: Arlen "Blanktape" Mandangan
- Country of origin: Philippines
- No. of episodes: 250

Production
- Executive producer: Toni Rose delos Santos
- Editors: Pablo Garcia; Arvin Dela Rosa; Julius Tan
- Running time: 60-90 minutes

Original release
- Network: TV5
- Release: August 15, 2008 – September 8, 2013

Related
- Game 'N Go

Lokomoko (Lokomoko is Filipino for Niloloko mo ako, English for "You're Fooling Me!") (formerly Lokomoko High, Lokomoko U, Lokomoko U Ang Kulit! and Lokomoko: La-Bus) is a Philippine television sketch comedy show broadcast by TV5. It aired from August 15, 2008, to September 8, 2013, replacing PBA on ABC and was replaced by Tropa Mo Ko Unli. It was TV5's longest-running comedy show.

== Brief history ==
The show was one of TV5's first shows, launched during August 9, 2008. Its original format was inspired by Wow Mali yet it was also a semi-gag show until in February 2009, it was adapted into a full-time gag show format airing on Friday evenings. After a year and two months, it moved to Wednesdays on April 7, 2010 with its most current format move to Thursdays in 2010 and eventually are back to Fridays on September 10, 2010. On May 6, 2011, the show returned to its original format, Lokomoko. On October 16, 2011, it was moved to Sunday, 11:30 am. On April 1, 2012 the show returned as Lokomoko U, a revival. In July 2012, it was moved to Saturday, 2:30 pm. On January 13, 2013 it was back on Sunday in a new timeslot with one and a half hour show from 11:30 am – 1:00 pm. With five years on the air, it was TV5's longest-running comedy show.

== Cancellation ==
Lokomoko U aired on its last episode on September 8, 2013, due to its low ratings. On September 14, 2013, a newest gag show was launched as Tropa Moko Unli replacing Lokomoko U, a combination of a former gag shows Tropang Trumpo and Lokomoko U, the casts are now joined forces to have a new gag show on TV5, and the show was also as a part of Weekend Do It Better on TV5.

== Cast ==
- Alex Gonzaga (2008–11)
- Randolf Stamatelaky (2008–10)
- Kim Gantioqui (2008–10)
- Valeen Montenegro (2008–13)
- Caloy Alde (2008–13)
- Cara Eriguel (2009–10)
- Empoy Marquez (2009–13)
- Long Mejia (2009–13)
- Gee Canlas (2009–10)
- Dianne Medina (2009–10)
- Brod Pete (2009–10)
- Krista Valle (2009–10)
- Louise delos Reyes (2009–10)
- Voyz Avenue (2009–13)
- Joseph Bitangcol (2010)
- Princess Ryan (2010)
- Yana Asistio (2010)
- Pauleen Luna (2010)
- Rainier Castillo (2010–11)
- Luningning (2010–13)
- Milagring (2010–13)
- Mariposa (2010–13)
- JC de Vera (2010–13)
- Edgar Allan Guzman (2010–13)
- Arci Muñoz (2010–13)
- Alwyn Uytingco (2010–13)
- Tuesday Vargas (2010–13)
- Eula Caballero (2011–13)
- Wendell Ramos (2012–13)
- Vin Abrenica (2012–13)
- Sophie Albert (2012–13)
- Akihiro Blanco (2012–13)
- Chanel Morales (2012–13)
- Mark Neumann (2012–13)
- Shaira Diaz (2012–13)

== Segments ==
=== As Lokomoko High ===
- Bading Tayong Dalawa, Tadong Dalawa, Payong Dalawa - parodies of Tayong Dalawa teaser
- BTEN: Balitang TEN - a parody of TV5 newscast TEN: The Evening News
- Darney- a parody of Darna and Barney
- Face 2 Face
- Isang Basong Luha - parody of the Japanese Drama One Liter of Tears
- Jessica Shiopao - a parody of GMA's Kapuso Mo, Jessica Soho
- LBM: Loko Bidyo Moko (music video parodies)
- Loko Flush Report - a parody of GMA Flash Report, set on a comfort room where the news anchor reads the news while excreting
- Midnight BJ - a parody of Midnight DJ
- ScotchBob SquarePants - a parody of SpongeBob SquarePants
- Tarantang Pinoy - a parody of Talentadong Pinoy
- Titik Co. "Titik N'ya, Titik Mo, Titik Nating Lahat"
- The Ricky High Exclusives - a parody of Q-11's defunct talk show The Ricky Lo Exclusives
- Totoy Buto - a parody of Totoy Bato
- Wiwiwi - a parody of ABS-CBN's former noontime show Wowowee
- Zorrox - a parody of GMA's Zorro
- Parodies of SNN: Showbiz News Ngayon, The Singing Bee, Matanglawin
- several commercial parodies

=== As Lokomoko U ===
- 1D La Cruz - a parody of Juan dela Cruz (1D is the nickname for British boy band One Direction)
- Awkward Momments
- Appliance Whisperer
- Babaeng Kutonglupa - a parody of Babaeng Hampaslupa teaser
- Bahaw: Ikalawang Hain - a parody of Valiente and second incarnation of Bahaw: Ang Kaning Lamig on Tropang Trumpo
- Battle Of The Brainless - a revival from Tropang Trumpo's segment and parody of the famous collegiate game show Battle of the Brains.
- Case to Case - a parody of Face to Face
- Dude The Moves
- EsteRomantiko
- Hellfire - parody of short running cooking show Quickfire
- Ina, Kapatid, Anak, Apo - a parody of Ina, Kapatid, Anak
- Jejemon KoW3Ez B33!- a parody of the Jejemon craze that swept the country in 2010
- La Bas - a parody of The Buzz
- LBM: Loko Bidyo Moko (music video parodies)
- Lokomentado - a parody of Dokumentado
- Pinoy Brainless - a parody of Eat Bulaga!'s segment Pinoy Henyo
- Please Be Careful - a parody of Be Careful with My Heart
- Que Horror Family
- S.O.S: Sounds of Silence- Sound effects starring Maui Manalo and Miko Aguilar
- Star Factory - a parody of Star Factor
- Talentadong Family - a parody of Talentadong Pinoy
- Tanong Ko Lang, Kulang...
- T3: Pa-Load - a parody of T3: Reload
- WWEeew - a parody of WWE
- Whose Line is it Anyhow? - a parody of popular U.S. game show Whose Line is it Anyway?
- "The Joke of the Philippines" - a parody of an ABS-CBN Talent Show of The Voice of the Philippines. The judges are Tuesday Vargas as Parody of Lea Salonga and Long Mejia as Parody of Apl.de.ap.
- several commercial parodies

== Awards ==
- Winner, Best Comedy Program - 19th KBP Golden Dove Awards
- Nominated, Best Comedy Gag Show - PMPC Star Awards For TV
  - Lokomoko High (2009)
  - Lokomoko U (2010 & 2012)
  - Lokomoko (2011)

== See also ==
- List of TV5 (Philippine TV network) original programming
