= Baker King (Philippine TV series) =

2015 Philippine television drama series

- Title card
- Genre: Romance
- Based on: King of Baking, Kim Takgu by Kang Eun-kyung
- Directed by: Mac Alejandre
- Starring: Mark Neumann; Shaira Mae; Akihiro Blanco; Inah Estrada
- Country of origin: Philippines
- Original language: Tagalog
- No. of episodes: 85

Production
- Executive producer: Wilma Galvante
- Running time: 30 minutes

Original release
- Network: TV5
- Release: May 18 – September 11, 2015

Baker King is a 2015 Philippine television drama series broadcast by TV5. The series is based on South Korean series Bread, Love and Dreams. Directed by Mac C. Alejandre, it stars Mark Neumann, Shaira Mae, Akihiro Blanco, and Inah Estrada. It aired on the network's evening line-up and worldwide on Kapatid TV5 from May 18 to September 11, 2015, replacing Wattpad Presents and was replaced by My Fair Lady. It is the first Korean drama adaptation to air on TV5. This is also TV5's first drama since Beki Boxer ended its run July 2014 apart from Wattpad Presents which features a new story every week.

== Plot ==
Takgu is the illegitimate son of Johnny Lee, president of Lee Han Seong Bread Factory, leading the Lee family to reject him. After his mother is kidnapped, Takgu leaves the Lee home and spends his teenage years looking for her while living on the streets and surviving though odd jobs. Takgu ends up working at famous Lucky Bakeshop where he will unexpectedly face-off against his half-brother, Michael. However, apart from learning how to become the best baker in the Philippines, Takgu will learn about life and love.

== Cast ==
=== Main cast ===
- Mark Neumann as Takgu San Miguel
- Akihiro Blanco as Michael Lee
- Inah Estrada as Eunice Bustillo
- Shaira Mae as Sunshine R. Gatchalian

=== Supporting cast ===
==== Lee family ====
- Boots Anson-Roa as Lee Hye Yeong
- Jackie Lou Blanco as Irene Lee
- Yul Servo as Manager Henry
- Raymond Bagatsing as President Johnny Lee
- Malak So Shdifat as Celine Lee
- Nicole Estrada as Aliyah "Ally" Lee

==== The bakery ====
- Joonee Gamboa as Master Javier Robles
- Allan Paule as Rey Gatchalian
- Anna Feleo as Peeta Gatchalian
- Ian De Leon as Victor
- Mon Confiado as Nando
- Sergio Garcia as Tiny
- Adolph Reyes as Bimbo

==== Other characters ====
- Diana Zubiri as Sonia San Miguel
- Via Antonio as Candice
- Vangie Labalan as Vising
- Patricia Ysmael as Monet
- Antoinette Garcia as Chinggay

=== Special participation ===
- Nourish Icon Lapuz as young Takgu
- Laurence Yuan Carrido as young Michael
- John Manalo as teenage Michael
- Kryshee Grengia as young Ally
- Jim Pebangco as Gardo
- Nanding Josef as Roger
- Jade Lopez as Lara
- Sheng Belmonte as Ruby
- Luke Jickain as James
- Jacob Benedicto as Alex
- Menggie Cobarrubias as Attorney Mendoza
- Karla Pambid as Aling Dolor
- Noel Urbano as Mang Cesar
- Franchesca Salcedo as young Celine

== Development ==
Bread, Love and Dreams is a Korean drama series broadcast on KBS2 in 2010 starring Yoon Shi-yoon, Joo Won, Eugene and Lee Young-ah. It was declared a "national drama" after garnering high ratings, including topping 50.0% for its finale episode.

In 2011, GMA Network aired the series, dubbed in Tagalog, under the title The Baker King. For most of its run, it was the highest rated and most watched show in the Philippines.

== Production ==
During a December 2013 trade launch to potential advertisers, TV5 announced it had acquired the Filipino adaptation rights to the drama. Apart from My Fair Lady, Baker King was revealed as one of two South Korean drama adaptations to air on the network in 2014.

TV5 talent Vin Abrenica was initially reported to have either been cast as the lead or second lead on the series. However, in March 2014, daily tabloid Journal reported that TV5 was interested in "borrowing" GMA talent Derrick Monasterio for Baker King, in which he would star with TV5 talents Ritz Azul and Eula Caballero.

There would be no news about the project until April 2015 when TV5 announced Baker King would premiere on 18 May with a cast including Boots Anson-Roa, Akihiro Blanco, Shaira Mae, and Inah Estrada. Mark Neumann was cast in the title role, contrary to what had been reported. Abrenica admitted to being "hurt" after learning he had not been cast on the series.

TV5 entertainment president Wilma Galvante said the Filipino adaptation would include Filipino "local flavor" based on the book Panaderia by Amy Uy, which is a study of various local breads from different parts of the Philippines.

== Ratings ==
On January 7, 2010, the drama peaked at 12.1% against its rival program with 9.0% based on AGB Nielsen's people rating in Mega Manila.
