= Claire Ruiz =

Filipino-Australian actress

- Born: Claire Ruiz Hartell; 28 November 1997 (age 28); Angeles City, Philippines
- Other name: Claire Hartell
- Occupation: Actress
- Years active: 2010–present
- Agent: Star Magic (2012–2025)

Claire Ruiz Hartell (born 28 November 1997) is a Filipino-Australian actress, best known for her roles in the television series Be Careful with My Heart as Joey Acosta, Beki Boxer as Venus, A Love to Last as Gena, Maalaala Mo Kaya as Abe/Abegail Mesa and A Family Affair as Florabelle/Belle Ramirez. She is an actress and talent of ABS-CBN's Star Magic.

== Early life and education ==
Ruiz was born November 28, 1997, in Angeles City, Philippines, the Filipina actress and model. She attended Westfields International School, a private international school located in her hometown of Angeles City, Pampanga. The school heavily featured her as a prominent alumna, celebrating her transition from local campus activities to mainstream Philippine media stardom.

== Career ==
Ruiz entered the entertainment industry at age 12 by auditioning for the inaugural season of Pilipinas Got Talent in 2010. She later competed in TV5's talent search Star Factor. Her breakthrough acting role came when she was cast as Joey Acosta in the hit daytime television series Be Careful with My Heart.

In the 2022, drama series A Family Affair , portrayed Florabelle "Belle" Ramirez, a seductive and complex character tangled in the lives of the Estrella brothers.

In the 2024, political drama series Pamilya Sagrado, plays the supporting role of Shaira Agustin.

== Personal life ==
Ruiz is highly dedicated to an active lifestyle, frequently sharing snippets of her intense gym sessions, physical training routines, and muscle recovery therapies. Beyond acting, she has a deep personal love for performing, specifically singing and dancing, which initially helped jumpstart her path to show business.

== Filmography ==
Key
†	Denotes productions that have not yet been released

=== Film ===
Year	Title	Role
2015	Surrogate Mother	
2015	Makata	
2015	Buhay Nanay	
2019	Finding You	Leah
2019	Marineros: Men in the Middle of the Sea	Karen
2023	Visitor (International Film)	
2023	Topakk	Gina Ramos
2024	Crazy Inlove With You	Jayda

=== Television ===
Year	Title	Role	Ref.
2010	Pilipinas Got Talent	Hannah Montana	
2010	Star Factor	Star Factor Hopeful	
2011	Star Confessions: Hubad – The Rosanna Roces Confession	Young Osang	
2011	Hey It's Saberdey!	Performer	
2012	Kapitan Awesome	Claire Net	
2012	Pidol's Wonderland: Ang Wendy ng Weather		
2012	Sunday Funday	Performer	
2012–2013	Be Careful with My Heart	Joey Acosta	
2013	Maalaala Mo Kaya: Diploma	Irma	
2013	Maalaala Mo Kaya: Telebisyon	Mylene	
2013	Madam Chairman		
2014	Beki Boxer	Venus	
2014	Maalaala Mo Kaya: Kwintas	Angie's Friend	
2014	Maalaala Mo Kaya: Stars	Lina	
2014	Maalaala Mo Kaya: Diary	Stephanie	
2015	Maalaala Mo Kaya: Bintana	Jess	
2015	Maalaala Mo Kaya: Banda	Young Viviene	
2015	Wansapanataym: Fat Patty	Amanda	
2015–2016	You're My Home	Clarisse Velez-Fontanilla	
2016	Maalaala Mo Kaya: Tommy Esguerra Story	Jessica	
2016	Wansapanataym: Candy's Crush	Lovi Angara	
2016	Maalaala Mo Kaya: The Filipino Flash	Rachel	
2016	The Greatest Love	Shiela	
2016	Magpahanggang Wakas	Amanda	
2016	Maalaala Mo Kaya: Luneta Park	Young Lorena	
2017	A Love to Last	Gena	
2017	Maalaala Mo Kaya: Bandila	Gerona	
2017	Ipaglaban Mo: Duda	Reyna	
2017	Hanggang Saan	Atty. Joanne Dimalanta	
2017	Coffee Break	Mitch	
2017	Love Connects: On/Offline	Rita	
2018	Maalaala Mo Kaya: Bibliya	Abegail Mesa	
2018	Banana Sundae	Various	
2018	Maalaala Mo Kaya: Lambat	Esther	
2018	Ipaglaban Mo: Biyenan	Lorraine	
2018	Wansapanataym: Ikaw Ang Ghost-O Ko	Angel of Death	
2018	Ngayon at Kailanman	Cathy Bermudez	
2019	Maalaala Mo Kaya: Family Portrait	Young Gloria Manalang-Angara	
2019	Precious Hearts Romances Presents: Los Bastardos	Young Catalina	
2019	Maalaala Mo Kaya: Wheelchair	Roselia	
2019	The General's Daughter	Tintin	
2020	A Soldier's Heart	Grace Valderama	
2020–2021	Sunday Noontime Live!	Performer	
2022	Flower of Evil	Susan Mirasol	
2022	A Family Affair	Florabelle Ramirez	
2023	Ano'ng meron kay Abok?	Emily	
2023	Nag-aapoy na Damdamin	young Isabel	
2024	Pamilya Sagrado	Shaira Agustin	
2025	Rainbow Rumble	Contestant	

=== Web series ===
Year	Title	Role
2020	I Am U	Steph
2020	Loving Emily	Steff
2021	GV Boys	Annabelle
2022	One Good Day	Beatrice Marquez
2025	Til Debt Do Us Part	Bettina

== Accolades ==
Awards and NominationsAwards and nominations received by Claire Ruiz
Award	Year	Category	Nominated work	Result	Ref.
Best Single Performance by an Actress	32nd PMPC Star Awards for Television	2018	Maalaala Mo Kaya: Bibliya	Nominated	
