= Jasmine (TV series) =

- Genre: Drama; Mystery; Horror
- Created by: Paulo Ferrer; Andrew Petch; Tanya Yuson; Mikk Vergara; Zig Marasigan; Maan Asuncion
- Written by: Paulo Ferrer (head); Mikk Vergara; Zig Marasigan
- Directed by: Mark Meily
- Creative director: Andrew Petch
- Starring: Jasmine Curtis-Smith; Vin Abrenica; Marvelous Alejo
- Theme music composer: Tris Suguitan
- Opening theme: Wala nang Pwedeng Magmahal Sa 'yo by Itchyworms (Universal Records)
- Country of origin: Philippines
- Original languages: Filipino; English
- No. of episodes: 9

Production
- Executive producer: Noemi Peji
- Producer: Madonna Tarrayo
- Editor: Edward Alegre
- Running time: 45 minutes
- Production companies: Unitel Productions, Inc. Ace Saatchi & Saatchi Advertising, Inc. ABC Development Corporation

Original release
- Network: TV5
- Release: June 1 – August 3, 2014

Jasmine (stylized in all caps) is a 2014 Philippine television drama horror series broadcast by TV5. Directed by Mark Meily, it stars Jasmine Curtis-Smith, Vin Abrenica and Marvelous Alejo. It aired from June 1 to August 3, 2014, and was replaced by Quiet Please!: Bawal ang Maingay.

The series aired every Sunday at 9:15 pm-10:15 pm (later moved to 5 pm-6 pm and replay at 10 pm-11 pm on June 22, 2014)

== Synopsis ==
The story follows a fictionalized version of Jasmine Curtis-Smith, a rising young actress at TV5, as she prepares to star in the network’s flagship series, Ur Loved, alongside the network's in-demand actor Alexis Vergara (Vin Abrenica). As she faces challenges from fellow actresses and confronts the harsh realities of the entertainment industry, she encounters a stalker known as Maskara, whose presence brings further complications into her life.

== Cast ==
- Jasmine Curtis as Jasmine Carvajal - After a slew of critically acclaimed indie movies, actress Jasmine must now make the jump to mainstream media. Can she juggle her dreams of becoming a “serious actress” and the network's plans of turning her into their next big star?
- Vin Abrenica as Alexis Vergara - Alexis, primetime prince of TV5, is “charming”, “lovable” and “down to earth”. He has been acting since he was a child and is now used to being in the spotlight.
- Marvelous Alejo as Selina Pascual - Selina is a talented actress with extensive work in both the indie and mainstream films. She considers Jasmine to be her arch rival in the network, and is willing to go to extremes to get exactly what she wants.

== Supporting cast ==
- Gerard Sison as Miguel Asuncion - Young entrepreneur and next-in-line to the Asuncion political dynasty, Miguel is one of Jasmine's most persistent suitors. Ever since she broke up with her boyfriend, Miguel has been there for her, caring for her, squeezing his way into her heart. He is perfect “boyfriend material”. But is he too good to be true?
- Nicole Estrada as Sarah Mae Miranda - A young, up and coming starlet, Sarah Mae is Selina's best friend. Sarah Mae is ambitious and talented, but her drive to prove herself to everyone often gets her in trouble.
- Matt Padilla as Insp. Ramon Ramirez - He is a young, idealistic PNPA graduate who grew up in the slums of Manila. He takes his job seriously. Sometimes too seriously.
- Alwyn Uytingco as Wendell Bautista - A fast-rising showbiz blogger, Wendell gets the scoop before anyone else does. He has befriended many celebrities, including Jasmine and he is growing in popularity in showbiz circles. How far will he go to dig dirt on his supposed friends in showbiz?
- Justine Peña as Carly Peralta- Jasmine's feisty, frank, and loyal personal assistant. Always the voice of reason, she serves as Jasmine's friend, confidant, and conscience.
- Cai Cortez as Mama Mia - She is a successful talent manager and Steven's rival. She and Steven used to be business partners until they had a falling-out. She always wanted to be Jasmine's manager but Steven beat her to it. She now manages Selina Pascual, Sarah Mae, and many new and established celebrities.
- Carlo Orosa as Steven Yap - The successful, no-nonsense manager of Jasmine who wants to make her the next big star of TV5.
- Jelson Bay as Insp. Emilio Osorio - Osorio thinks his partner Inspector Ramon Ramirez takes his job too seriously.
- Meyanne Plamenio as Leila Alfonso- Leila is Steven's scatterbrained, loyal assistant.
- Romnick Sarmenta as Sen. Enrique Asuncion-Miguel's father who is a member of Senate of the Philippines, and attempted to run for the presidency but lost the nomination to his older brother, Joaquin, he dislikes Jasmine for his son.
- Michael de Mesa as Pres. Joaquin Asuncion-the President of the Philippines, he likes Jasmine for his nephew.
- Pen Medina as Gov. Amado Asuncion-father of Joaquin and Enrique and the governor of Santa Magdalena.
- Christopher de Leon as Mayor Edward Asuncion-mayor of Cabagan and a former congressmen from Santa Magdalena, he is a cunning politician and a corrupt mayor, he lost his 3rd term mayoral bid to his eldest sister.
- Irma Adlawan as Mayor Carmen Asuncion-newly elected mayor of Cabagan and defeated her own brother, Edward in the mayoralty race, but she later died due to an ambush ordered by Edward, she was replaced by Vice-Mayor Victor Sevilla (played by Nonie Buencamino), she is the auntie of Miguel, and she likes Jasmine.
- Nonie Buencamino as Mayor Victor Sevilla-the former Vice-Mayor of Cabagan, who replaced Mayor Carmen due to her ambush, he served for Cabagan, but Jasmine and Miguel suspected that he uses taxpayers money to kill someone, he later lost to Mayor Carmen's nephew, Miguel with just 8 of the votes. Awards and nominations

Year	Award	Nomination	Result
2015	Asia-Pacific Advertising Festival	Promo Lotus (Best Integrated Promo Campaign)	Won
2015	Boomerang Awards	Creative Effectiveness	Won
2015	Boomerang Awards	Campaign Category	Won
2015	Spikes Asia	Branded Content & Entertainment	Won
2015	Cannes Lions International Festival of Creativity	Branded Content & Entertainment	Nominated
2015	Kidlat Awards	Publication and Media	Nominated

== See also ==
- List of TV5 original programming
