= Abrenica =

Abrenica is a surname. Notable people with the surname include:

- Aljur Abrenica (born 1990), Filipino actor, dancer, model, and singer
- Vin Abrenica (born 1991), Filipino actor, model, dancer, and brother of Aljur
