= Never Say Goodbye (TV series) =

2013 Philippine television drama series

- Genre: Action; Melodrama; Romance
- Developed by: Elmer L. Gatchalian
- Written by: Nathaniel Arciaga; JV Bagas; Dindo Erece; Ana Maria Macapugay; Andrew Paredes; Marianne Villalobos
- Directed by: Mac C. Alejandre; Alexander Sabater
- Creative director: Mac C. Alejandre
- Starring: Vin Abrenica; Sophie Albert
- Theme music composer: Ogie Alcasid
- Opening theme: "Ang Aking Puso" by Ogie Alcasid
- Country of origin: Philippines
- Original language: Filipino
- No. of episodes: 63

Production
- Executive producer: Roselle Lorenzo
- Production locations: Baguio; Metro Manila
- Running time: 45 minutes

Original release
- Network: TV5
- Release: February 11 – May 10, 2013

Never Say Goodbye is a 2013 Philippine television drama broadcast on TV5. It aired from February 11 to May 10, 2013.

== Cast and characters ==
=== Main cast ===
- Vin Abrenica as William Carpio
- Sophie Albert as Kate Montecastro

=== Supporting cast ===
- Nora Aunor as Marta Marasigan-Carpio
- Alice Dixson as Criselda Madrigal-Montecastro
- Cesar Montano as Javier Montecastro
- Gardo Versoza as Dindo Carpio
- Rita Avila as Glenda Maglungsod / Greta Pendelton
- Megan Young as Vera Maglungsod / Pendelton
- Edgar Allan Guzman as Troy Mendez

=== Reucrring cast ===
- Raquel Villavicencio as Yaya Maring
- Lander Vera-Perez as Joseph Mendez
- Malak So Shdifat as Valerie
- Alvin Anson as Ramil
- Benjo Leoncio as Miko
- Brent Manzano as Brix
- Chris Leonardo as Noli
- Angeli Bayani as Clara
- AJ Dee as Steve
- Jervi Li as Mama Melo

=== Special participation ===
- Eula Caballero as the young Marta Marasigan *
- Charee Pineda as the young Criselda Madrigal *
- Alwyn Uytingco as the young Dindo Carpio *
- Martin Escudero as the young Javier Montecastro *

=== Guest appearances ===
- Marvelous Alejo as the young Glenda Maglungsod / Greta Pendelton *

(*) Seen on flashback parts

== See also ==
- List of programs broadcast by TV5
