= My Fair Lady (2015 TV series) =

Philippine romantic comedy series

- Title card
- Genre: Romantic comedy Drama
- Based on: My Fair Lady by Kim Eun-hee and Yoon Eun-kyung
- Directed by: Ricky S. Rivero
- Starring: Jasmine Curtis-Smith; Vin Abrenica; Luis Alandy
- Opening theme: "Hot Stuff" by Davichi
- Country of origin: Philippines
- Original language: Tagalog
- No. of episodes: 65

Production
- Production location: Philippines
- Running time: 45 minutes
- Production company: TV5 Entertainment Group

Original release
- Network: TV5
- Release: September 14 – December 11, 2015

Related
- My Fair Lady (2009)

My Fair Lady is a 2015 Philippine television drama romance comedy television series broadcast by TV5. The series is based on the 2009 South Korean television series of the same title. Directed by Ricky S. Rivero, it stars Jasmine Curtis-Smith, Vin Abrenica and Luis Alandy. It aired on the network's evening line up and worldwide on Kapatid TV5 from September 14 to December 11, 2015, replacing Baker King and was replaced by Wattpad Presents.

== Cast ==
=== Main cast ===
- Jasmine Curtis-Smith as Audrey Tiuseco
- Vin Abrenica as Hero Del Rosario
- Luis Alandy as Benjie

=== Supporting cast ===
- Katrina Legaspi as Vanessa
- Chanel Morales as Nikki
- Yayo Aguila as Aling Susan
- Marjorie Barretto as Viveka
- DJ Durano as Marcelo
- Jenny Miller as Martha
- Joross Gamboa as Sir Arthur
- Eddie Gutierrez as Lolo Matteo
- Alwyn Uytingco as Narrator
- Marilyn Villamayor as Violy
