= The Missing Husband =

2023 Philippine television drama series

- Title card
- Genre: Drama; Mystery
- Created by: Des Garbes-Severino
- Written by: Des Garbes-Severino; Renato Custodio; Mark Angos
- Directed by: Mark A. Reyes V
- Creative director: Aloy Adlawan
- Starring: Rocco Nacino; Yasmien Kurdi
- Theme music composer: Ann Margaret Figueroa
- Opening theme: "Pangako Hanggang sa Dulo" by Denise Barbacena
- Country of origin: Philippines
- Original language: Tagalog
- No. of episodes: 80

Production
- Executive producer: Mavic Tagbo
- Cinematography: Gary Gardoce
- Camera setup: Multiple-camera setup
- Running time: 12—26 minutes
- Production company: GMA Entertainment Group

Original release
- Network: GMA Network
- Release: August 28 – December 15, 2023

The Missing Husband is a 2023 Philippine television drama mystery series broadcast by GMA Network. Directed by Mark A. Reyes V, it stars Rocco Nacino in the title role and Yasmien Kurdi. It premiered on August 28, 2023, on the network's Afternoon Prime line up. The series concluded on December 15, 2023, with a total of 80 episodes.

The series is streaming online on YouTube.

== Premise ==
A husband who is dealing with financial problems, goes missing. His wife searches for him and will discover information that will challenge their marriage, when she finds out that her husband vanished on purpose.

== Cast and characters ==
Cast

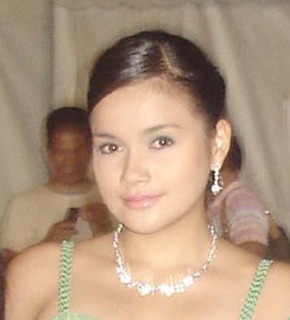
Yasmien Kurdi

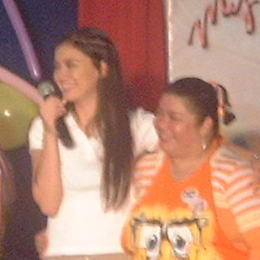
Nadine Samonte (left)

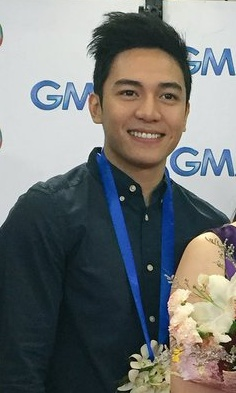
Jak Roberto

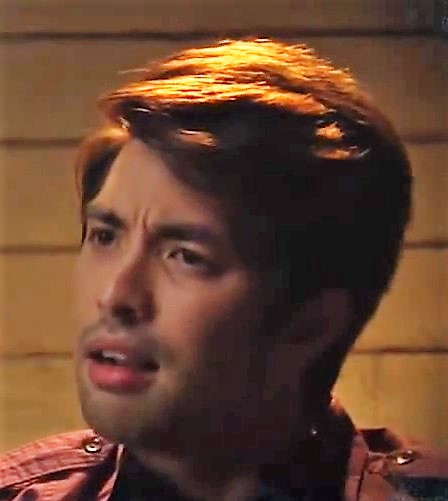
Joross Gamboa

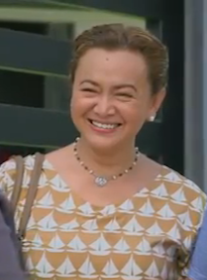
Sharmaine Buencamino

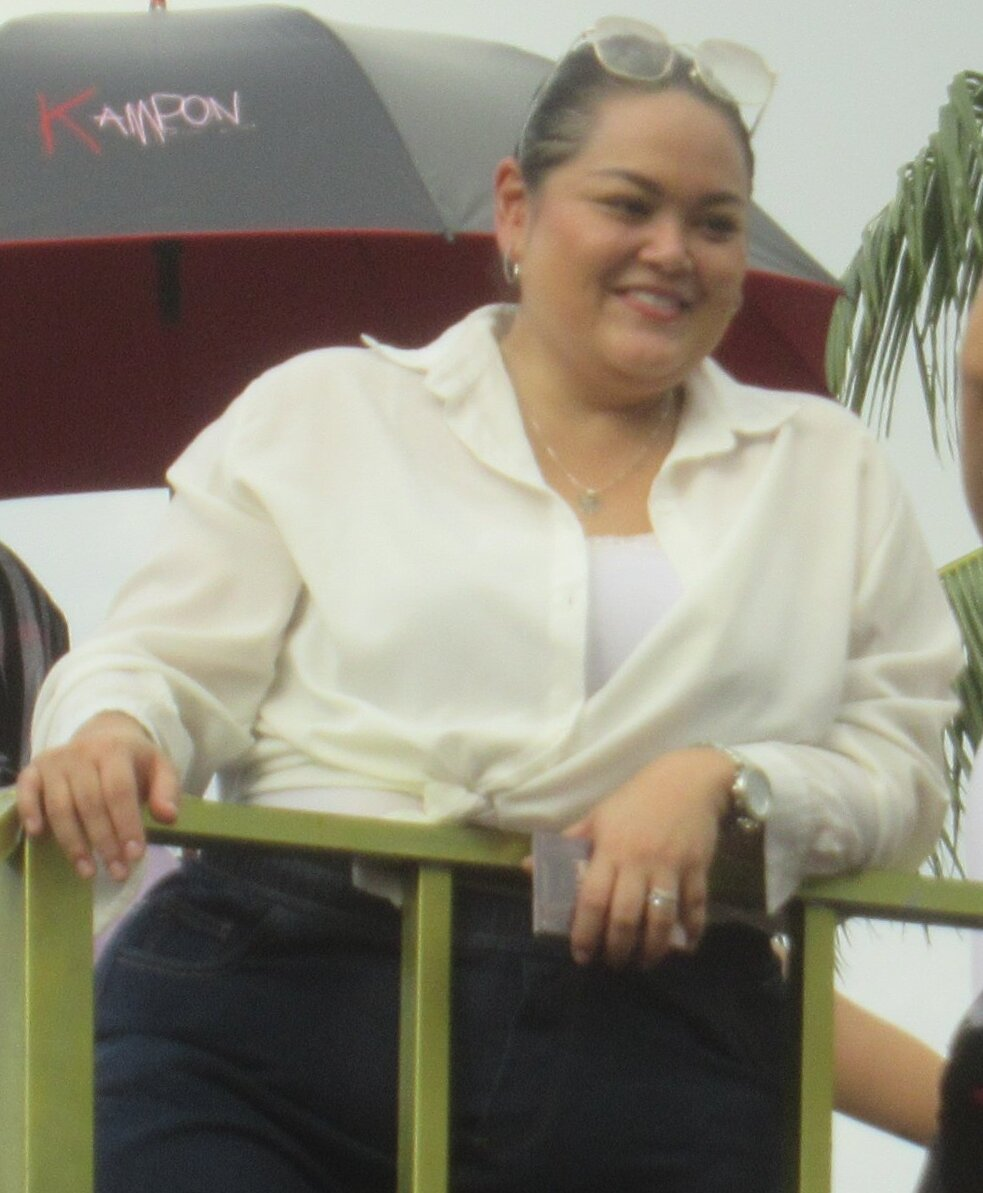
Cai Cortez

Lead cast

- Rocco Nacino as Antonino "Anton" Rosales / Lemuel
- Yasmien Kurdi as Millicent "Millie" Rosales

Supporting cast

- Nadine Samonte as Winona "Nona" Villafuerte
- Jak Roberto as John Edward "Joed" Enriquez Lazaro
- Sophie Albert as Victoria "Ria" Angeles
- Joross Gamboa as Brendan Salazar
- Shamaine Buencamino as Sharon Rosales
- Max Eigenmann as Leilani "Leila" Rosales-Gopez
- Michael Flores as Bayani "Banong" Gopez
- Bryce Eusebio as Norman Rosales Gopez
- Patricia Coma as Arianna "Arya" Villafuerte Lazaro
- Cai Cortez as Glenndolyn "Glenn" Feliciano
- Jenzel Angeles as Jodalie "Joda"

Guest cast

- Mark Herras as Nicandro "Nick" Enriquez Lazaro
- Rob Sy as Ramon Cardenas
- Mark Comiso as Maceta
- Daniel Bato as Doroja
- Ejay Bucal as Mateo
- Jenny Miller as Nick and Joed's aunt
- Zyren dela Cruz as younger Nick
- Dentrix Ponce as younger Joed

== Production ==
Principal photography commenced in February 2023.

== Ratings ==
According to AGB Nielsen Philippines' Nationwide Urban Television Audience Measurement People in television homes, the pilot episode of The Missing Husband earned a 7.5% rating.

== Accolades ==
Accolades received by The Missing Husband
Year	Award	Category	Recipient	Result	Ref.
2025	37th PMPC Star Awards for Television	Best Daytime Drama Series	The Missing Husband	Nominated	
