= Misibis Bay (TV series) =

2013 Philippine television drama series

- Genre: Drama
- Created by: ABC Development Corporation
- Developed by: Elmer L. Gatchalian
- Directed by: Monti P. Parungao
- Starring: Ritz Azul; Christopher De Leon; Vivian Velez; Daniel Matsunaga; Vin Abrenica; Victor Silayan; Megan Young
- Country of origin: Philippines
- Original languages: Filipino; English
- No. of episodes: 45

Production
- Running time: 30-45 minutes

Original release
- Network: TV5
- Release: July 1 – December 6, 2013

Misibis Bay is a 2013 Philippine television drama series broadcast by TV5. Directed by Monti P. Pirungao, it stars Ritz Azul, Christopher de Leon, Daniel Matsunaga, Vin Abrenica, Victor Silayan, Megan Young, Malak So Shdifat and Luke Jickain. It aired from July 1 to August 30, 2013.

The series is the third offering of TV5 Mini Serye. Like its first offering, Sa Ngalan ng Ina and its second offering, Nandito Ako, the show is intended for six-week run, but the series was extended for two weeks due to its successful ratings.

== Overview ==
Set in Bicol resort of the same name, MISIBIS BAY is a TV5 miniseries starring Maita Ramirez as Mita Ramirez, an impoverished young woman whose life changes when she marries wealthy resortvmagnate Anthony Cadiz (Christopher de Leon), forcing her to navigate his privileged social circle.

== Cast ==
- Ritz Azul as Maita Ramirez - Maita is a slum girl who dreams of providing a comfortable life for her ailing grandmother. Her marriage to a rich but older man will lead to a sudden reversal of her fortune.
- Christopher de Leon as Anthony Cadiz - Anthony is a real estate tycoon who has three sons from different mothers. His sudden decision to marry a young woman will trigger a series of events that will test the loyalty of his own family.
- Vivian Velez as Miranda Cadiz - Miranda is Anthony's scheming and manipulative older sister who secretly wants to take over her brother's resort.
- Boots Anson-Roa as Delia Ramirez - Delia is Maita's grandmother. She is the original owner of their inherited land stole by Miranda.
- Daniel Matsunaga as Andrew Cadiz - Andrew is the eldest and most business-minded of Anthony's three sons. He is engaged to be married to socialite Lara Borromeo, but he will find himself falling for Maita.
- Vin Abrenica as Charlie Cadiz- Mild-mannered and a bit nerdy, Charlie is the youngest of the Cadiz brothers. But unknown to him, there is a secret that covers his true identity.
- Victor Silayan as Bernard Cadiz - Bernard is Anthony's second son. A roguish playboy, he loves to party and organizes most of the events in the resort. He's attracted to Maita... and just about every girl in the island.
- Megan Young as Lara Borromeo - Lara is a young socialite and the Vice-President of her family's garments company. She is engaged to Andrew, but she finds Maita's presence a threat to their relationship.
- Luke Jickain as Tommy - Tommy works as a lifeguard in the resort, and is friends with Andrew and Bernard.
- Malak So Shdifat as Didi - Didi is Maita's best friend and one of the resort's staff.
- Andrea Del Rosario as Maggie - Personal assistant at Cadiz Group.
- Bing Pimentel as Rosalee - Lara's mother.
- Say Alonzo as new personal assistant at Cadiz Group.

== See also ==
- List of TV5 (Philippine TV network) original programming
