= List of Pamilya Roces episodes =

Pamilya Roces (transl. Roces Family) is a 2018 Philippine comedy drama series starring Carla Abellana, Gabbi Garcia and Jasmine Curtis-Smith. The series premiered on GMA Network's GMA Telebabad evening block and worldwide via GMA Pinoy TV from October 8 to December 14, 2018, replacing Inday Will Always Love You.

NUTAM (Nationwide Urban Television Audience Measurement) People in Television Homes ratings are provided by AGB Nielsen Philippines.

== Series overview ==
Season	Episodes	Originally released	
Season	Episodes	First released	Last released
1	50	October 8, 2018	December 14, 2018

== Episodes ==
=== October 2018 ===
Episode		Original air date	Social media hashtag	AGB Nielsen NUTAM People			Ref.
Episode		Original air date	Social media hashtag	Audience Share	Timeslot rank	Whole day rank	Ref.
1	"Pilot"	October 8, 2018	#PamilyaRoces	7.4%	#2		
2	"Family No. 3"	October 9, 2018	#PRFamilyNumber3	6.4%	#2		
3	"Maghiwalay na Tayo" (Let's Break Up)	October 10, 2018	#PRMaghiwalayNaTayo	7.0%	#2		
4	"Hit and Run"	October 11, 2018	#PRHitAndRun	7.1%	#2		
5	"Patalbugan" (Knockout)	October 12, 2018	#PRPatalbugan	6.9%	#2		
6	"Foul Play"	October 15, 2018	#PRFoulPlay	6.8%	#2		
7	"Kabog si Amber" (Amber's Blast)	October 16, 2018	#PRKabogSiAmber	7.5%	#2		
8	"Patola" (Tolerant)	October 17, 2018	#PRPatola	7.6%	#2		
9	"Bida Bida" (Storytelling)	October 18, 2018	#PRBidaBida	8.5%	#1		
10	"Okrayan" (Insult)	October 19, 2018	#PROkrayan	8.9%	#1		
11	"Sulutan" (Rivalry)	October 22, 2018	#PRSulutan	7.5%	#2		
12	"Mumu ni Lily" (Lily's Ghost)	October 23, 2018	#PRMumuNiLily	8.4%	#2		
13	"The Clash"	October 24, 2018	#PRTheClash	8.5%	#2		
14	"Tukso, Layuan Mo Ako" (Temptation, Stay Away from Me)	October 25, 2018	#PRTuksoLayuanMoAko	7.9%	#2		
15	"Tuloy ang Ligaya" (Enjoy Happiness)	October 26, 2018	#PRTuloyAngLigaya	8.0%	#2		
16	"Bukingan" (Open)	October 29, 2018	#PRBukingan	7.9%	#2		
17	"Two Timer"	October 30, 2018	#PRTwoTimer	7.2%	#2		
18	"Sisters vs. Outsiders"	October 31, 2018	#PRSistersVsOutsiders	7.1%	#2		
Average				7.6%			

=== November 2018 ===
Episode		Original air date	Social media hashtag	AGB Nielsen NUTAM People in Television Homes			Ref.
Episode		Original air date	Social media hashtag	Rating	Timeslot rank	Whole day rank	Ref.
19	"Hulihin si Hugo" (Catch Hugo)	November 1, 2018	#PRHulihinSiHugo	7.0%	#2		
20	"Suguran" (Onrush)	November 2, 2018	#PRSuguran	6.0%	#2		
21	"Positive"	November 5, 2018	#PRPositive	5.0%	#2		
22	"Who's Your Daddy?"	November 6, 2018	#PRWhosYourDaddy	7.2%	#2		
23	"Fake News"	November 7, 2018	#PRFakeNews	7.4%	#2		
24	"Bagong Panganib" (New Danger)	November 8, 2018	#PRBagongPanganib	7.5%	#2		
25	"Friend or Enemy"	November 9, 2018	#PRFriendOrEnemy	7.4%	#2		
26	"Aminan ng Feelings" (Confessing Feelings)	November 12, 2018	#PRAminanNgFeelings	6.2%	#2		
27	"Ganting Pailalim" (Vengeful Ground)	November 13, 2018	#PRGantingPailalim	6.6%	#2		
28	"Magnanakaw" (Robber)	November 14, 2018	#PRMagnanakaw	6.9%	#2		
29	"Suspect"	November 15, 2018	#PRSuspect	7.4%	#2		
30	"Huli Ka" (I Caught You)	November 16, 2018	#PRHuliKa	7.0%	#2		
31	"Hinala" (Suspicion)	November 19, 2018	#PRHinala	5.6%	#2		
32	"War of the Roces"	November 20, 2018	#PRWarOfTheRoces	6.9%	#2		
33	"Huli sa Akto" (Caught in the Act)	November 21, 2018	#PRHuliSaAkto	7.8%	#2		
34	"Bistado na Kayo" (You're All Busted)	November 22, 2018	#PRBistadoNaKayo	9.4%	#2		
35	"Gigil na si Crystal" (Crystal is Gritty)	November 23, 2018	#PRGigilNaSiCrystal	8.4%	#2		
36	"Galit ng Tunay na Asawa" (Anger of the Real Spouse)	November 26, 2018	#PRGalitNgTunayNaAsawa	6.1%	#2		
37	"Asawa vs. Kabit" (Wife vs. Mistress)	November 27, 2018	#PRAsawaVsKabit	9.1%	#2		
38	"Bintang" (Blame)	November 28, 2018	#PRBintang	9.0%	#2		
39	"Kabit No. 3" (Mistress No. 3)	November 29, 2018	#PRKabitNumber3	9.3%	#2		
40	"Anak vs. Kabit" (Daughter vs. Mistress)	November 30, 2018	#PRAnakVsKabit	8.9%	#2		
Average				7.4%			

=== December 2018 ===
Episode		Original air date	Social media hashtag	AGB Nielsen NUTAM People			Ref.
Episode		Original air date	Social media hashtag	Audience Share	Timeslot rank	Whole day rank	Ref.
41	"Bagong Mrs. Roces" (New Mrs. Roces)	December 3, 2018	#PRBagongMrsRoces	9.0%	#2		
42	"Ama laban sa Anak" (Father vs. Child)	December 4, 2018	#PRAmaLabanSaAnak	8.8%	#2		
43	"Tamang Hinala" (Right Suspicion)	December 5, 2018	#PRTamangHinala	8.5%	#2		
44	"Jade vs. Maisa"	December 6, 2018	#PRJadeVsMaisa	7.7%	#2		
45	"Tiyak na Kapahamakan" (Calamity)	December 7, 2018	#PRTiyakNaKapahamakan	9.4%	#1		
46	"Walang Ligtas" (Unsafe)	December 10, 2018	#PRWalangLigtas	8.9%	#1		
47	"Buwelta ng Asawa" (Wife's Turnover)	December 11, 2018	#PRBuweltaNgAsawa	9.5%	#1		
48	"Matinding Pasabog" (Intense Surprise)	December 12, 2018	#PRMatindingPasabog	9.7%	#1		
49	"Pagbabalik" (Comeback)	December 13, 2018	#PRPagbabalik	9.1%	#2		
50	"The Final Reunion"	December 14, 2018	#PRTheFinalReunion	9.9%	#1		
Average				9.1%			
