= Vin Abrenica =

Filipino actor and singer (born 1991)

- Born: Avin Guiang Abrenica; May 29, 1991 (age 35); Angeles City, Philippines
- Occupations: Actor; model; singer
- Years active: 2012–present
- Agents: Talent5 (2012–2016); Star Magic (2016–2021); ALV Talent Circuit (2021–present)
- Known for: Wildflower as Jepoy Madrigal
- Spouse: Sophie Albert (m. 2023)
- Children: 2
- Relatives: Aljur Abrenica (brother); Allen Abrenica (brother); Alleah Abrenica (sister)

Avin "Vin" Guiang Abrenica (born May 29, 1991) is a Filipino actor who appeared as a contestant on the reality-based talent search show Artista Academy and later won the competition with Sophie Albert. He is known for biggest break as Jepoy Madrigal in Wildflower and Elmer Marasigan, the villain and rival of Alex in A Soldier's Heart.

== Career ==
After his win in Artista Academy, he was the cast as the male lead in Never Say Goodbye, a primetime series that aired on TV5. Along with Sophie Albert as the female lead. The cast also included Nora Aunor, Alice Dixson, Gardo Versoza, and Cesar Montano. That same year, he landed the role of Charlie Cadiz in Misibis Bay, a mini serye that inaugurated him as a hunk actor.

The following year, Abrenica appeared in the gay-themed comedy drama Beki Boxer and the romantic suspense drama Jasmine.

In 2015, Abrenica received a significant project to top-bill the remake of My Fair Lady with Jasmine Curtis Smith.

=== 2016–2020: Career breakthrough ===
In 2016, he transferred his talent contract to ABS-CBN and Star Magic in a co-management contract with Arnold Vegafria. He has initially made multiple guest appearances in Ipaglaban Mo! and Maalaala Mo Kaya. In the original plan for the primetime series A Love to Last (originally titled The Second Wife), Abrenica was set to play the role of Julia Barretto's love interest. However, the network executives later decided to cast him as one of Maja Salvador's leading men in Wildflower. This role has taken another important turning point in his career since it launched him into a more prominent actor.

His final project with the network was the primetime series A Soldier's Heart, where he played Capt. Elmer Marasigan. His character is a villain and the rival of Alex Marasigan, the main character in the series.

=== 2021–present: Signing with GMA Network ===
After much anticipation, Abrenica returned to acting in the last quarter of 2021 when he signed with GMA Network and now solely managed by ALV Talents Circuit. He made his primary appearance in Tadhana: Kasalanan episode. Abrenica is set to debut in his first full-length project with GMA-7. He will be part of the upcoming action-adventure series, Lolong, a reunion project with Shaira, his batchmate in Artista Academy. He will play the role of Diego, who is the lost boyfriend of Bella and leader of the Atubaw.

In 2023, Abrenica kicked his first lead role in the mythical fantasy series Mga Lihim ni Urduja. He played Onyx, a master criminal and the leader of bounty hunters in search of Urduja's gems. With his lean, muscular build and menacing gaze, Abrenica looks every inch the exact counterpart to his on-screen rivals and the perfect alpha male to lead a pack of bloodthirsty bounty hunters.

== Personal life ==
He is a younger brother of ABS-CBN talent Aljur Abrenica, himself a winner in StarStruck: The Next Level. He attended Don Bosco Academy, Pampanga.

He has two more siblings besides Aljur and he is the second oldest amongst his younger siblings, a brother and a sister. Also, he has two nephews, Alas Joaquin Abrenica and Axl Romeo Abrenica.

Abrenica has been dating actress Sophie Albert since June 2013. The two had met the previous year as co-competitors on the talent show Artista Academy, which they both won. Albert and Abrenica initially ended their relationship in 2016, citing "personal and career-related problems", but reconciled in 2018. In December 2020, the couple became engaged. In February 2021, Albert revealed that she and Abrenica had moved in together. That same month, they announced that they were expecting their first child, a daughter. Their daughter was born on March 15, 2021. They got married on January 25, 2023.

== Filmography ==
=== Television ===
==== Drama ====
Year	Title	Role
2012	Lokomoko U	Himself
2012	Pidol's Wonderland presents: My Monito, My Monita!	
2013	Tropa Mo Ko Unli	Various
2013	Never Say Goodbye	William Carpio
2013	Misibis Bay	Charlie Cadiz
2014	Beki Boxer	Renato "Atong" Villaflor
2014	Jasmine	Alexis Vergara
2014	Wattpad Presents: Fake Fiancée	Rafael Raymundo
2015	Tropa Mo Ko Unli Spoof	Various
2015	Wattpad Presents: My Fiancé Since Birth	Vincent
2015	Mac & Chiz: Life's a Beach	Carl
2015	Wattpad Present: Marry You	Lance Abellano
2015	Wattpad Presents: How to Break-up with a Bad Boy	Lourd Simon Sandoval
2015	LolaBasyang.com: Ang Plawtin ni Periking	Periking
2015	My Fair Lady	Hero Del Rosario
2015	Ipaglaban Mo: Tinalikurang Pangako	Donji Cruz
2016	Wattpad Presents Telemovie: Mysterious Guy At The Coffee Shop	Cedrick Dela Vega
2016	Ipaglaban Mo: Engkwentro	Victor
2016	Wattpad Presents Telemovie: Confession of a Fashion Blogger	Travis
2016	Maalaala Mo Kaya: Pole	Jay
2016	Ipaglaban Mo: Sugal	Ben
2016	Maalaala Mo Kaya: Gitara	Niko
2017–2018	Wildflower	Jepoy Madrigal
2017	Ipaglaban Mo: Paratang	Andrei Policarpio
2017	Maalaala Mo Kaya: Laptop	Gil
2019	Wansapanataym: Switch Be with You	Lucky Wheels Executive
2019	Ipaglaban Mo: Gayuma	Gimo
2019	Past, Present, Perfect?	Daniel / Darwin
2019	Ipaglaban Mo: Taiwan	Jess
2019	Maalaala Mo Kaya: Red Roses	Chris
2020	A Soldier's Heart	Elmer Marasigan
2022	Imbestigador: Ormoc City Homicide Case	Aldrian Formentera
2022	Tadhana: Kasalanan	Father Edgar
2022	Lolong	Diego†
2023	Mga Lihim ni Urduja	Onyx Dayanghirang-Salazar

==== Reality show ====
Year	Title	Note	Ref.
2012	Artista Academy	Best Actor	

==== Variety shows and game shows ====
Year	Title	Note
2012	Wil Time Bigtime	
2012	Sharon	
2012–2013	Game 'N Go	
2013	Pinoy Explorer	
2013	Wasak	EP.76
2013	It's More Fun with Philip	S2 EP.1
2013	Killer Karaoke	
2015–2016	Happy Truck ng Bayan	
2016	Minute to Win it	
2016–2020	ASAP	Performer
2018	I Can See Your Voice	S1 EP.121
2020	I Can See Your Voice	S2 EP.30
2020	Happy Time	
2021	Bawal Na Game Show	Ep.81
2022	Family Feud	
2022	TiktoClock	
2023–present	It's Showtime	Recurring guest / performer

=== Film ===
Year	Title	Role
2015	Unlike Father, Unlike Son	
2016	Ang Hapis at Himagsik ni Hermano Puli	
2017	Extra Service	Carlo
2017	Corpus Delicti	Julius Arcega
2017	Moonlight Over Baler	Kenji / Nestor
2017	Deadma Walking	Joseph
2018	Kasal	Arvin
2018	Nakalimutan Ko Nang Kalimutan Ka	Migs
2020	Coming Home	SJ Librada
2023	Tricycle Driver, Kasangga Mo	Sammy Romero
2023	The Revelation	Vincent
2023	Topakk	Sarmiento

=== Music video appearances ===
Year	Title	Performer	Notes	Ref.
2013	Time Machine	Six Part Invention	Philpop 2013	
2021	Gusto Ko Nang Bumitaw	Sheryn Regis		

== Theater ==
Year	Title	Role
2015	Juego De Peligro	Daniel

== Discography ==
=== Singles ===
- 2014: "Wala Namang Forever"
