= ALV Talent Circuit =

Philippine talent management company

ALV Talent Circuit, Inc.
- Company type: Private
- Industry: Talent management Popular Music; Entertainment
- Founded: 1995; 31 years ago
- Founder: Arnold Vegafria
- Headquarters: Pasig, Philippines
- Key people: Arnold Vegafria (President)
- Services: Talent agency
- Website: ALVTalentCircuit.com/

ALV Talent Circuit is a talent management company in the Philippines under the leadership of Arnold L. Vegafria.

== Artists ==
=== Male talents ===
1. Billy Crawford (formerly; moved to Viva Artists Agency)
2. Gary Estrada
3. Monsour del Rosario
4. John Prats (formerly; moved to Cornerstone Entertainment)
5. Victor Basa
6. Kris Lawrence
7. Baron Geisler
8. RJ Ledesma
9. David Licauco (co-managed with Sparkle GMA Artist Center)
10. Anthony and David Semerad
11. Kiko Estrada (co-managed with Star Magic)
12. Martin del Rosario (co-managed with Sparkle GMA Artist Center)
13. Enzo Pineda (formerly; moved to Star Magic)
14. Teejay Marquez
15. Luis Hontiveros (co-managed with Sparkle GMA Artist Center)
16. Vin Abrenica

=== Female talents ===
1. Kuh Ledesma - singer, actress
2. Pinky Amador - actress
3. Geneva Cruz - singer, actress
4. Winwyn Marquez - actress/dancer
5. Camille Prats - actress
6. Iya Villania - dancer/actress (formerly; moved to Asian Artist Agency)
7. Nikki Gil - singer/actress/TV host
8. Carla Abellana - actress
9. Valerie Concepcion - actress
10. Krista Ranillo
11. Samantha Lopez
12. Cesca Litton - TV personality
13. Isabella de Leon
14. Isabella L. Gonzalez - singer/songwriter/painter
15. Divine Lee
16. Allison Harvard -model
17. Bianca King - actress TV/Film, TV host
18. Megan Young – model, actress, Miss World 2013
19. Shaira Diaz
20. Beauty Gonzalez (co-managed with Sparkle GMA Artist Center)
21. Aiko Melendez
22. Michelle Dee (co-managed with Sparkle GMA Artist Center)
23. Bernadette Allyson
24. Chanel Morales (co-managed with Sparkle GMA Artist Center)
25. Devon Seron
26. Kris Bernal
27. Claudine Barretto (co-managed with GMA Network)
28. Sunshine Cruz - actress and singer
