= Jome Silayan =

Filipino actor and model

Victor 'Jome' Silayan
- Born: Jose Mari Victor Espino Silayan; August 1, 1992 (age 34); Philippines
- Occupations: Actor; model
- Years active: 2011–present
- Agent: Talent5 (now Star Worx) (2011–2014; 2026–present)
- Relatives: Vic Silayan (grandfather); Chat Silayan (aunt)

Jose Mari Victor Espino Silayan (born August 1, 1992), known professionally as Victor Silayan and also known as Jome Silayan, is a Filipino actor and commercial model. He was a Regal baby and also a former artist of TV5. Silayan is recognized as one of the underwear endorsers of clothing brand Bench and is notable for his appearances in Old Spice advertisements.

== Personal life ==
He is the grandson of the late veteran actor Vic Silayan, nephew of the late beauty queen turned actress, Rosario Silayan-Bailon and the youngest of three children of Ruben Victor Silayan and Roxanne Espino.

== Education ==
Silayan finished grade and high school in De La Salle Santiago Zobel School in Alabang, Muntinlupa. He took up Fine Arts in UST but shifted as an Economics and Applied Corporate Management student at De La Salle University – Manila where he's into mixed martial arts (Jiu Jitsu, Muay Thai and Judo), painting, sculpting, photography and music. He was a member of the Muay Thai varsity team. He's now in third year.

== Television career ==
Silayan was named TV5's Primetime Prince. His first project in the network was The Sisters, wherein he portrayed the partner of Eula Caballero's character.

Before he signed a contract with TV5 in 2011, Silayan was offered to play the role of Lumad in GMA Network's historical series Amaya, but he turned it down in favor of his studies and the role went to Mikael Daez.

After having his contract with TV5 expired, Silayan became a freelancer and transferred to ABS-CBN in 2015.

In 2022, he officially made his first appearance on GMA Network, starting with his guesting on Artikulo 247.

He returns again to ABS-CBN as a guest role of The Iron Heart and as a supporting role of FPJ's Batang Quiapo as Police Lt. Luis Jacobe, the godson of one of the main antagonist of the series PMGEN Augustus V. Pacheco, who was played by Julio Diaz.

== Filmography ==
=== Film ===
Year	Title	Role
2015	The Love Affair	Noah Castillo
2016	Always Be My Maybe	Jeric Valdez
2016	Just the 3 of Us	Tim
2017	The Ghost Bride	Ahia
2019	Last Fool Show	Rocky
2019	Unbreakable	Luke
2024	Un/Happy For You	Matt
2025	Love You So Bad	Coach

=== Television ===
Year	Title	Role
2011	Rod Santiago's The Sisters	Warren Zialcita
2011	Regal Shocker: Family Reunion	Mark
2011–2012	Glamorosa	Stefano Lustico
2012	Third Eye	Adrian
2013	Boracay Bodies	Himself / Contestant / Winner
2013	Misibis Bay	Charlie
2015–2022; 2026–present	ASAP	Himself / Performer
2015	Ipaglaban Mo: Itinagong Krimen	William
2015–2016	Pasión De Amor	Leo
2016	Ipaglaban Mo: Silakbo	Nestor
2016	Tubig at Langis	Jaime Agoncillo
2017	A Love to Last	Jerold Francisco
2017	Ipaglaban Mo: Taksil	Samuel Valderama
2017	Ipaglaban Mo: Sekyu	Gary
2017–2018	Wildflower	Enrique
2018	Sana Dalawa ang Puso	Donnie Pamintuan
2018	Precious Hearts Romances Presents: Araw Gabi	Francisco "Franco" Mamaril
2019	Maalaala Mo Kaya: Pregnancy Test	James
2019	Ipaglaban Mo: Sabik	Mr. Hontiveros
2019	Nang Ngumiti ang Langit	young Reynante "Nante" Castillo
2019	FPJ's Ang Probinsyano	Joselito "Bolit" Laxamana
2019	Maalaala Mo Kaya: Third Eye	Pryts
2019	The General's Daughter	Zandro "Tres" Abellanosa / Wilson Montino
2019	Ipaglaban Mo: Bagong Salta	Gary
2019–2020	The Haunted	Rommel Mendez
2020	Ipaglaban Mo: Tukso	Luther
2020	A Soldier's Heart	young Yosef Alhuraji
2020–2021	Walang Hanggang Paalam	Franco Vergara† / Diego Villanueva
2021	Maalaala Mo Kaya: TV	Randy
2022	Artikulo 247	Alfred Gomez
2022	Tadhana: Ligaya	Greg
2022–2023	The Iron Heart	Matthew
2023	Family Feud	Himself / Contestant
2023	Underage	Rico Siguenza
2023–2024	FPJ's Batang Quiapo	Police Lt. Luis Jacobe
2024	Widows' War	Rodolfo Palacios
2024	Tadhana: Soldier's Wife	Jaime
2025	Incognito	Sevi
2026	House of Lies	Aldrin
2026	Tadhana: Tunay na Misis Solis	Frank

=== Microdrama ===
Year	Title	Role
2026	The Crown and the Secret Prince	Liam
