= Cai Cortez =

Filipina actress

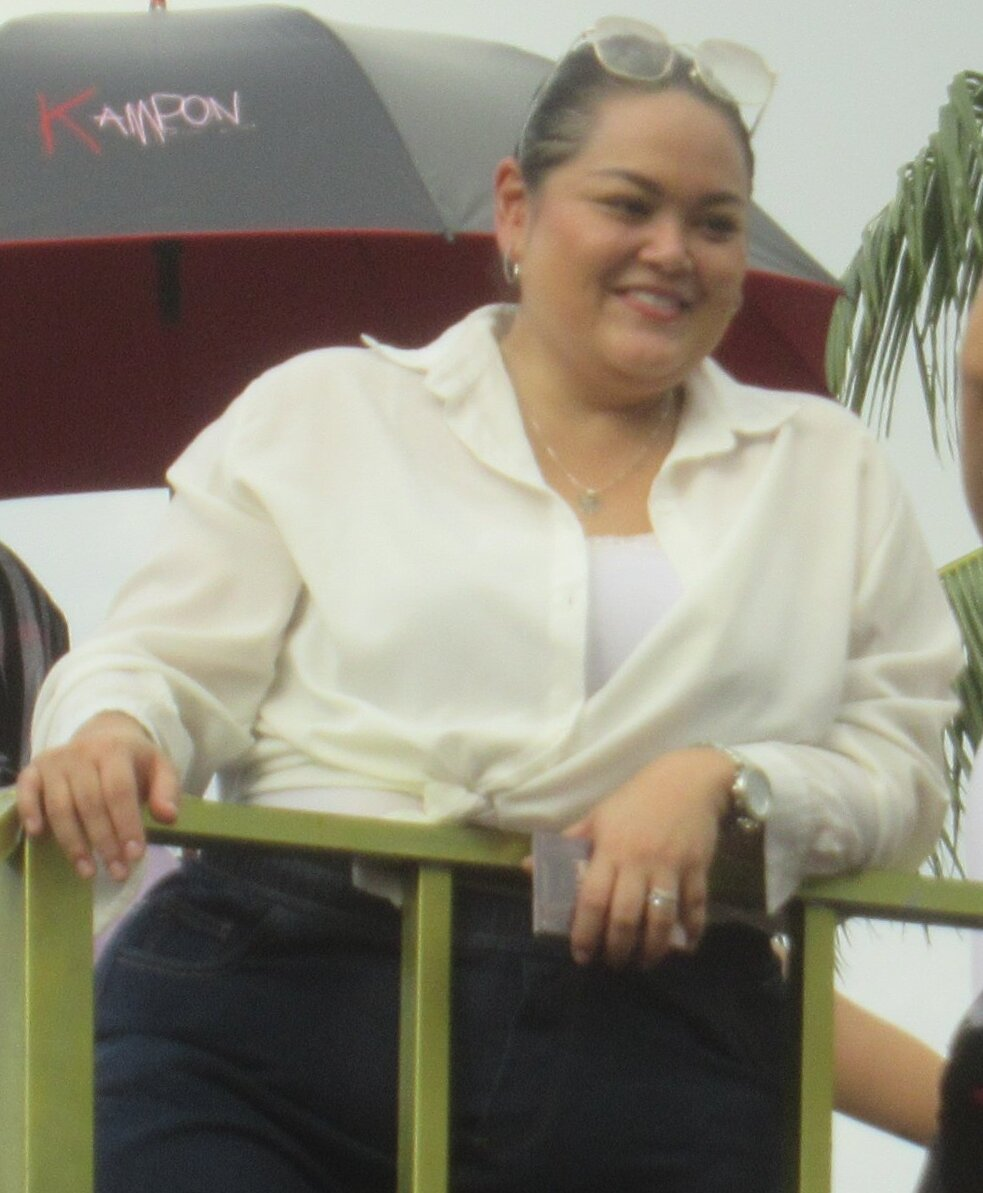
- Cortez in 2023

Member of the Taytay Municipal Council
- Incumbent
- Assumed office June 30, 2025

Personal details
- Born: Carizza Cortez; July 1, 1988 (age 38) Taytay, Rizal, Philippines
- Party: NPC (2024–present)
- Children: 2
- Relatives: Rez Cortez (father)
- Occupation: Actress, comedian, model, endorser, politician

Carizza Cortez-Rkhami (born July 1, 1988) is a Filipina politician, actress, and comedian serving as a councilor of Taytay, Rizal since 2025.

== Biography ==
Carizza Cortez was born on July 1, 1988, in Taytay, Rizal, a densely populated municipality of Rizal. She is the daughter of the actor Rez Cortez.

She took up Theatre Arts at the University of the Philippines-Diliman.

She has two children with her husband Wissem Rkhami.

== Filmography ==
=== Film ===
Year	Title	Role	Notes	Source
2009	Maximus & Minimus	Max		
2009	And I Love You So	Teacher Grace		
2010	Paano na Kaya	Jubis		
2010	Here Comes the Bride	Marize		
2010	My Amnesia Girl	Maia		
2011	Ang Babae Sa Septic Tank	Jocelyn		
2011	My House Husband: Ikaw Na!	Stella Villafrancia		
2013	The Bride and the Lover	Pinky		
2013	Ang Turkey Man Ay Pabo Rin	Girlie		
2014	Starting over Again	Beb		
2014	Third Eye	Ryzza		
2014	Beauty in a Bottle	Wendy		
2015	Everyday I Love You	Receptionst		
2015	Buy Now, Die Later	Larra	Segment: "Halimuyak"	
2016	Imagine You & Me	Vangie		
2016	Ang Taba Ko Kasi			
2016	Ang Babae sa Septic Tank 2: ForeverIsNotEnough	Jocelyn		
2017	Fallback			
2017	Foolish Love			
2017	My Ex and Whys	Candelaria "Tita Candy" Ferrer		
2018	Ang Dalawang Mrs. Reyes	Baby		
2018	Da One That Ghost Away	Tabako		
2018	The Girl in the Orange Dress	Rachel		
2018	Kasal	Kaye		
2018	Bakwit Boys	Stacey		
2019	Portrait of My Love			
2019	#Jowable	Karissa		
2020	Four Sisters Before the Wedding	Matutina Marie "Toti Marie/Tina Marie" Bugayong		
2021	Love or Money	Cat		
2022	Partners in Crime	Amelia Libme		
2023	Kampon	Rhona		
2024	A Thousand Forests	Lovely Tolentino	Sunshine's mother who is a body positivity advocate	
2025	Song of the Fireflies			
2026	18th Rose	Berta		

=== Television ===
Year	Title	Role	Source
2010	Kristine	Keanna	
2010	Habang May Buhay	Debbie	
2010	My Driver Sweet Lover	Minnie	
2012–2015	Luv U	Becky Belo	
2012	Regal Shocker	Emilia Trinidad / Michelle	
2012	Be Careful with My Heart	Luisa	
2013	Toda Max	Miss Maganda	
2014	Jasmine	Mama Mia	
2014	My Destiny	Let-let	
2015	Once Upon a Kiss	Fiona Allegre	
2016	Tubig at Langis	Sally	
2017–2018	Ika-6 na Utos	Charlotte Amalie "Char" Ledesma	
2018	Ang Forever Ko'y Ikaw	Marissa "Issa / Queenie" Mercado-Lastimosa	
2018	Wansapanataym	Pamu	Episode: "Gelli in a Bottle" 15 episodes.
2018–2019	Ngayon at Kailanman	Mela	
2019	TODA One I Love	Josefina "Finny" Rogers Obrero	
2020	Anak ni Waray vs. Anak ni Biday	Ezra	
2020	Ilaban Natin Yan!	Herself / Kalkalera	
2021	Magkaagaw	Madam Kitchie	
2021	First Yaya	Norma Miranda	
2022	First Lady	Norma Miranda	
2023	Wish Ko Lang!: Binalot na Handa	Krizza	
2023	The Missing Husband	Glenndolyn "Glenn" Feliciano	
2023	Comedy Island Philippines		
2024	Abot-Kamay na Pangarap	Joyce	Episodes 468–475
2024	What’s Wrong with Secretary Kim	Klarisse "Kla" Liwanag	
2024	High Street	Ruth Chavez	
2024	Ang Himala ni Niño: Unang Libro ng Niña Niño	Kisses	
2026	Apoy sa Dugo	Lorraine Mendez	

=== Microdrama ===
Year	Title	Role
2025	Rehab	Julianne Reyes
