= Sophie Albert =

Filipino actress and television personality (born 1990)

- Born: Bianca Regina Lyttle Reyes; August 3, 1990 (age 36); Mandaluyong, Philippines
- Other name: Bianca Reyes
- Occupations: Actress; model; singer; host
- Years active: 2007–present
- Agent: Star Magic (2007–2012, 2017); Sparkle GMA Artist Center (2017–present)
- Spouse: Vin Abrenica (m. 2023)
- Children: 2
- Relatives: Kris Aquino (first cousin once removed/aunt); Bimby Aquino Yap (second cousin); Aljur Abrenica (brother-in-law)
- Family: Cojuangco

Bianca Regina Lyttle Reyes-Abrenica (born August 3, 1990), known professionally as Sophie Albert, is a Filipino actress, television personality, model, and singer of European (Spanish-Italian and Irish-Portuguese) and Chinese descent. She joined the GMA Network in 2017 and signed an exclusive contract with Sparkle.

== Career ==
=== 2010–2016: Early television career ===
Albert was one of the new talents launched by ABS-CBN's Star Magic in their Batch 15 in 2007, using the name Bianca Reyes (maiden name). From a young age, it was already her dream to be an actress. She joined Star Magic without telling her parents because her mother did not wish for her to enter show business because she was still young and studying. This was also the reason why she left showbiz soon after.

In 2012, again without the knowledge of her parents, Albert joined the televised talent search Artista Academy of TV5. She became the competition's female grand winner, The Best Actress. Albert has mentioned that her winning the competition has convinced her mother of letting her re-enter and stay in the entertainment industry.

TV5's management suggested she use a screen name instead of her real name because of the abundance of Biancas and Reyeses already present in the Philippine entertainment. She chose to use the name Sophie Albert (Albert is her maternal grandmother's maiden surname).

In 2013, her first project after her win was the drama series Never Say Goodbye, where she was paired with Best Actor Vin Abrenica. He later became her real-life boyfriend. They worked with Alice Dixson, Cesar Montano, Gardo Versoza and Nora Aunor.

One of her breakthrough projects after Artista Academy was the 2014 Cinemalaya movie #Y which later on won Special Citation for Ensemble Acting award. The film is a coming-of-age story that revolves around the lives of upper-class and modern-day youth, which the title reference to Generation Y, while the hashtag marks this generation known for their affinity with social media and technology, and combines this with a tale of teen suicide, sex, drugs, and alcohol, and the ideological lifestyle of YOLO.

In the same year, Albert and her Artista Academy co-finalists Chanel Morales and Stephanie Rowe were supposed to top-bill TV5’s adaptation of the hit American suspense series Pretty Little Liars. It was supposed to air in April 2014, but a rumor floated that the Pretty Little Liars adaptation was already shelved. Although TV5 denied the rumor, the project was never aired.

After this, Albert headlined a few episodes of TV5’s Wattpad Presents until she decided to return to ABS-CBN.

=== 2017–present: Breakthrough with GMA Network ===
After asking to be released a few months early from her contract with TV5, Albert decided to become an actress without any home network. She did one project in ABS-CBN, the broadcast network and parent company of Star Magic, in an episode of Ipaglaban Mo. Soon after, in October 2017, Albert signed an exclusive contract with GMA Network and GMA Artist Center (now Sparkle). She has since gotten a steady stream of projects for years.

=== Villainous and present roles ===
She did supporting roles in teleseryes until 2018, when she was given the plum kontrabida role of Amber in the prime-time series Pamilya Roces.

2019 was a big year for Albert. She rose to stardom via her portrayal of the main antagonist role Reign, a rich and evil concubine in the afternoon series Bihag who caused the kidnap of Ethan and Jessie’s misfortune, and was cast as the leading lady in the prime-time series The Gift.

She has since returned to acting albeit in episodic programs such as My Fantastic Pag-ibig and Daig Kayo Ng Lola Ko.

In 2022, she played the minor character and antagonist role of Hazel Roces in Abot-Kamay na Pangarap.

In 2023, she played the antagonist role of Ria Angeles in The Missing Husband.

== Personal life ==
Albert did not want it to be known to the public, but eventually it was found out that she is a member of the prominent Cojuangco family. Her paternal grandmother, Josephine C. Reyes, is the Chair of the Board of Trustees and 7th president of the Far Eastern University (FEU). Reyes was the sister of former Filipino congressman José Cojuangco Jr., who served as the 9th President of the Philippine Olympic Committee (POC), and Corazon Aquino, former President of the Philippines. Albert is the niece of actress and equestrienne Mikee Cojuangco, former Filipino President Benigno Aquino III and actress and host Kris Aquino. Albert has mentioned that Mikee, in particular, was very supportive during her time on the talent show Artista Academy.

Albert was dating actor Vin Abrenica since June 2013. The two met the previous year as co-competitors on Artista Academy, which they both won. Albert and Abrenica initially ended their relationship in 2016, citing "personal and career-related problems", but reconciled in 2018. In December 2020, the couple became engaged. In February 2021, Albert revealed that she and Abrenica had moved in together. That same month, they announced that they were expecting their first child. Their daughter, Avianna, was born on March 15, 2021. On January 25, 2023, they married at the National Shrine of Mary Help of Christians, Don Bosco, Better Living Subdivision, Parañaque City. Their second garden wedding was held on January 28 at Club Ananda in Tagaytay City. on what could have been the 90th birthday of Albert's great-aunt, Corazon Aquino. In July 2024, she announced her second pregnancy. In November 2024, they welcomed their second daughter, Amara.

== Filmography ==
=== TV series ===
Year	Title	Role	Ref.
2007	Komiks	Various (as Bianca Reyes)	
2008	I Am KC	Various (as Bianca Reyes)	
2008	Astigs: Astigs in Haay...School Lyf	Various (as Bianca Reyes)	
2009–2012	Maalaala Mo Kaya	Various (as Bianca Reyes)	
2012	Pidol's Wonderland presents: My monito, My Monita!	Estelle	
2013	Never Say Goodbye	Kate Montecastro	
2013	Undercover	Katherine	
2014	Wattpad Presents: Fake Fiancé	Demi Magsaysay	
2015	Wattpad Presents: Cupid Fools	Ingrid	
2015	Wattpad Present: Marry You	Yumiko Hayashi	
2015	No Harm No Foul	Kim	
2017	Ipaglaban Mo: Hulidap	Peachy	
2017	Magpakailanman: Nika Manika - The Possessed Doll	Ihna	
2017	Daig Kayo Ng Lola Ko: Darling, ang Pangit na Duckling	Darling	
2018	The One That Got Away	Chanel Gonzalez	
2018	Daig Kayo ng Lola Ko: Oh My Genie	Onie	
2018	Sherlock Jr.	Erika	
2018	Daig kayo ng lola ko: Ex-B Academy	Teacher Beth Hoven	
2018	The Stepdaughters	Barbie Lopez	
2018	Dear Uge: To-gather Again	Maricel	
2018	Victor Magtanggol	Edda	
2018	Magpakailanman: Kulam ng Karibal	April	
2018	Pamilya Roces	Amber Bolocboc Roces	
2019	Maynila: Love Begins @40	April	
2019	Tadhana: Seoul Mates	Anne	
2019	Bihag	Regina Marie "Reign" Sison	
2019	Daddy's Gurl: Copy Cat	Ella	
2019	Daig kayo ng lola ko: When the Clock Strikes 12	Fairylyn	
2019	Dear Uge: Ikaw, number 2?, itsura mo?!	Arianne	
2019–2020	The Gift	Helga Ventura	
2020	Descendants of the Sun: The Philippine Adaptation	Liza Ayson	
2020	Dear Uge: Minsan ang minahal ay ako	Marie	
2021	My Fantastic Pag-ibig: Beast Next Door	Ashley	
2022	Dear Uge: Once Upon a Day	Matilda	
2022	Abot-Kamay na Pangarap	Hazel Roces	
2023	The Missing Husband	Victoria "Ria" Angeles	
2023	Magpakailanman: Ina Ka ng Anak Mo	Grace	
2024	Tadhana: Pinaasa	Frida	
2024	Forever Young	Marian Malaque	

=== TV show ===
Year	Title	Notes	Ref.
2012	Wil Time Bigtime		
2012	Sharon: Kasama Mo, Kapatid		
2012–2013	Game N' Go		
2013	Pinoy Explorer		
2013	Wasak	EP.76	
2013	It's More Fun with Philip	S2 EP.1	
2015	Extreme Series: Kaya Mo Ba 'To?		
2015–2016	Happy Truck ng Bayan		
2016–2017	ASAP Natin 'To		
2017	Eat Bulaga!		
2017–2019	Sunday PinaSaya		
2020	All-Out Sundays		
2022	Family Feud		
2022	TiktoClock		
2023	TiktoClock		
2023	Fast Talk With Boy Abunda		
2023	All-Out Sundays		
2023	Family Feud		
2023–present	It's Showtime		

=== Reality show ===
Year	Title	Notes	Ref.
2012	Artista Academy	Best Actress	
2012	Artista Academy Breaktime		

=== Films ===
Year	Title	Role	Notes	Ref.
2014	#Y	Lia		
2016	Till The End Of Us	Aica		
2017	Moonlight Over Baler	young Fidela		
2018	Recipe For Love	Karla		
2019	Cara x Jagger	Belle		

=== Music video appearances ===
Year	Title	Performer	Note	Ref.
2013	Time Machine	Six Part Invention	Philpop 2013	
