= A Soldier's Heart =

2020 Philippine action military drama series

- Title card
- Genre: Action drama; Military fiction
- Created by: Charo Santos-Concio
- Written by: Carlo Katigbak; Chie Floresca; Chino Nicanor; April Kristine Jalandra; Jerry Gracio
- Directed by: Richard V. Somes; Raz De La Torre; Mervyn Brondial
- Starring: Gerald Anderson; Carlo Aquino; Vin Abrenica; Elmo Magalona; Jerome Ponce; Yves Flores; Nash Aguas; Sue Ramirez; Sid Lucero
- Music by: Carmina Cuya
- Opening theme: "Hanggang Mamatay" by Noel Cabangon
- Composer: Noel Cabangon
- Country of origin: Philippines
- Original language: Filipino
- No. of seasons: 2
- No. of episodes: 110 (list of episodes)

Production
- Executive producers: Carlo Katigbak; Cory Vidanes; Laurenti Dyogi; Ruel Bayani
- Producers: Marielle de Guzman-Navarro; Roda Catolico Dela Cerna
- Cinematography: Neil Daza
- Editors: Joy C. Buenaventura; Dennis A. Salgado; Ron Joseph Ilagan; Ding Mora; Abby Rustia; Marietta Manlutac
- Production company: RCD Narratives

Original release
- Network: ABS-CBN
- Release: January 20 – March 13, 2020
- Network: Kapamilya Channel
- Release: June 15 – September 18, 2020

A Soldier's Heart is a Philippine television drama action series broadcast by ABS-CBN and Kapamilya Channel. Directed by Richard V. Somes, Raz De La Torre and Mervyn Brondial, it stars Gerald Anderson, Carlo Aquino, Vin Abrenica, Elmo Magalona, Jerome Ponce, Yves Flores, Nash Aguas, Sue Ramirez and Sid Lucero. It aired on the network's Primetime Bida line up and worldwide on TFC from January 20 to September 18, 2020.

== Synopsis ==
The series primarily focuses on the soldiers of the 4th Infantry Division of the Philippine Army and their actions during combat. Through multiple perspectives, the story focuses on these soldiers, mainly: Alex Marasigan (Gerald Anderson), an IT expert who quits his desk job and joins because just like his brother, he wants to serve the country, Abraham "Abe" Kamlun (Carlo Aquino), a Tausug Muslim man, who, despite his family's opposition of the move, joins the Army nonetheless, and Michael Mendoza (Nash Aguas), a boy who joins the Army to provide for his family.

The series also focuses on their Moro separatist adversaries, led by Saal Alhuraji (Sid Lucero), also known by his nom de guerre Abdul Waajid, who seeks to avenge his father who was killed by the military.

== Cast and characters ==
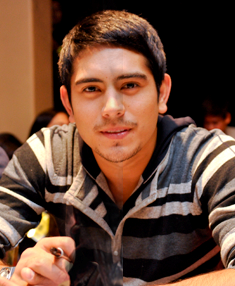
Gerald Anderson portrays Alex Marasigan.

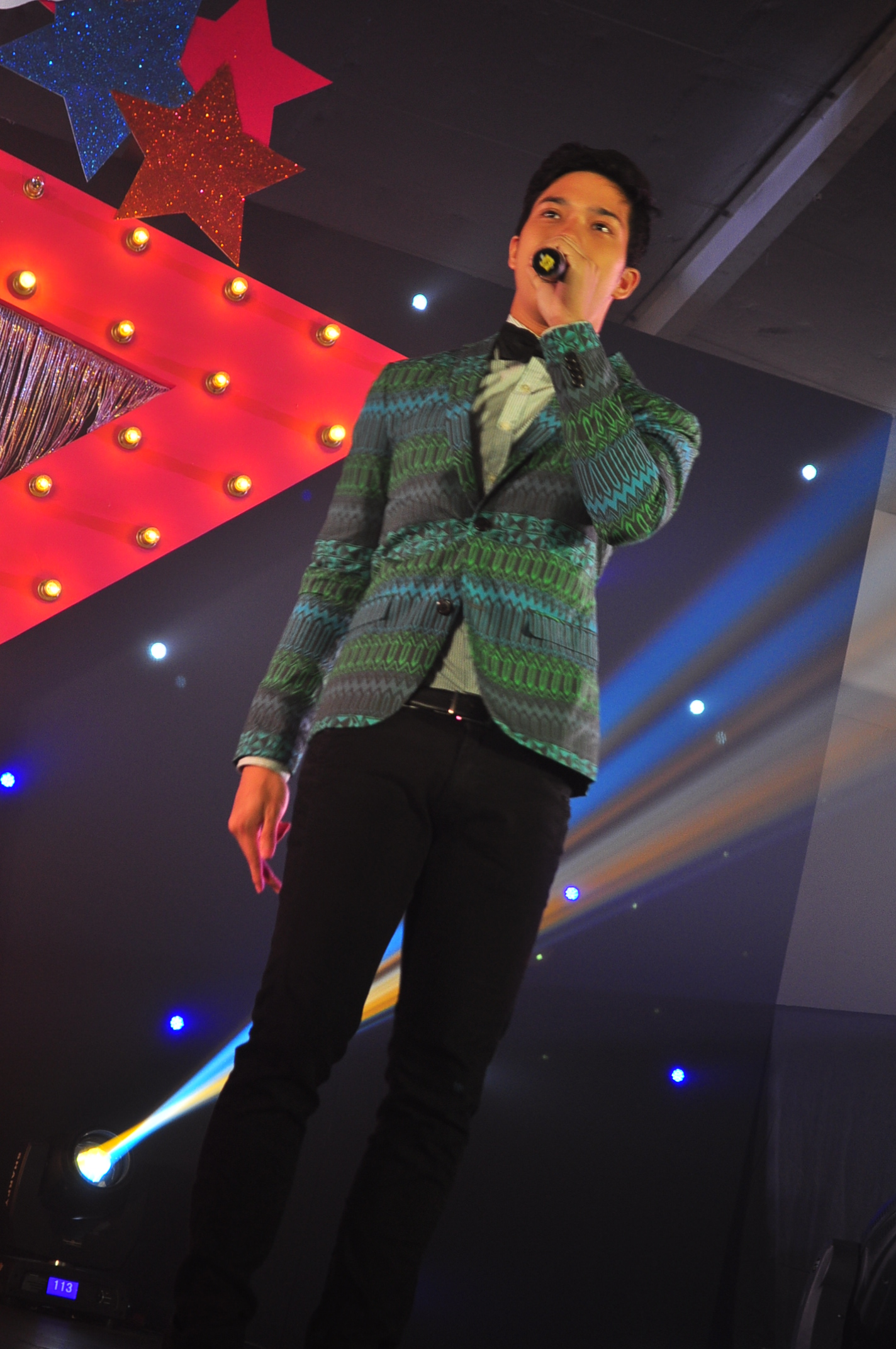
Elmo Magalona portrays Jethro Mondejar.

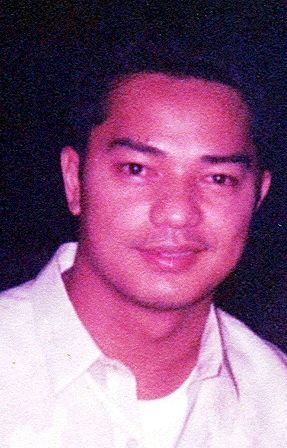
Ariel Rivera portrays Victor Mondejar.

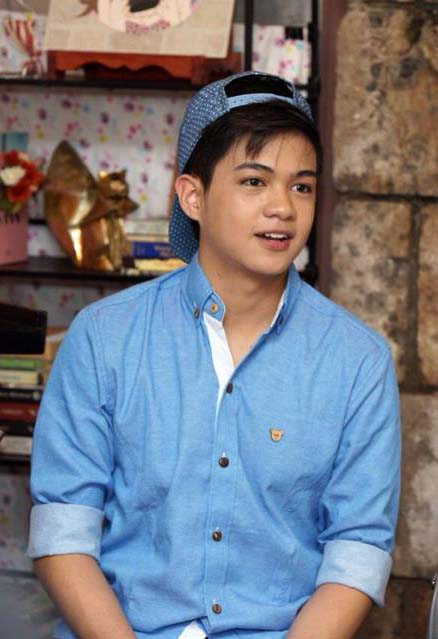
Francis Magundayao portrays Amir Majul.

Main cast

- Gerald Anderson as Pfc. Alexander "Alex" Marasigan, PA / Hakeem Alhuraji
- Carlo Aquino as Sgt. Abraham "Abe" Kamlun, PA
- Vin Abrenica as Capt. Elmer Marasigan, PA
- Elmo Magalona as Capt. Jethro Mondejar, PA
- Yves Flores as 2nd Lt. Benjamin "Benjie" Arguelles, PA
- Jerome Ponce as 2nd Lt. Philip "Phil" Panganiban, PA
- Nash Aguas as Sgt. Michael "Striker" Mendoza, PA
- Sue Ramirez as Capt. Lourdes "Lourd" Bacalso, PA
- Sid Lucero as Saal Alhuraji/Abdul Waajid

Supporting cast

- Ariel Rivera as BGen. Victor C. Mondejar, AFP
- Rommel Padilla as BGen. Dante L. Marasigan†, AFP
- Irma Adlawan as Yasmin Alhuraji/Amarah Alhuraji
- Raymond Bagatsing as Col. Melicio Adriano, PA
- Mickey Ferriols as Minda Marasigan
- Mon Confiado as Lt. Col. Raul R. Lucente, PA
- Nikki Valdez as Fatima Alhuraji
- Matt Evans as Rasheed Ahmad
- Nor Domingo as Col. Virgilio I. Fontiveros, PA
- Angelo Ilagan as Pvt. Gregorio "Gorio" Salud
- Isay Alvarez as Maysam Kamlun
- Jun Hidalgo as Ahmed Kamlun
- Claire Ruiz as Grace Valderama
- Royce Cabrera as Pvt. Andy Alfonso, PA
- Acey Aguilar as Pvt. Jacob Cornejo, PA
- Patrick Quiroz/Francis Magundayao as Amir Majul
- Charlie Dizon as Isabel Gezali

Guest cast

- John Vincent Servilla as Chino Villaverde
- Richard Quan as Gov. Amer Gezali
- Sammie Rimando as Chloe Gezali
- Elora Espano/Shaira Opsimar as Aaliyah Abad
- Levi Ignacio as Cong. Shamal Shakiri
- Ketchup Eusebio as Cpl. Olan Arguelles, PA
- Lito Pimentel as Yosef Alhuraji
- Victor Silayan as young Yosef
- Manuel Chua as young Victor
- Teroy Guzman as Abdul Waajid
- Minco Fabregas as Jamal Kamlun
- Dionne Monsanto as Capt/Atty. Odessa Mariano PA

== Broadcast ==
The series airs on ABS-CBN's Primetime Bida evening block and worldwide on The Filipino Channel.

On March 16, 2020, despite having already canned its episodes, the show suspended it's airings and its production was put on hiatus due to the 2020 Luzon enhanced community quarantine in response to the COVID-19 pandemic in the Philippines. Its timeslot was temporarily filled by Wildflower, iWant Originals and Tubig at Langis.

Thereafter, the series future placed in doubt after the ABS-CBN closure, following the cease and desist order issued by the National Telecommunications Commission on account of its franchise expiration. However, the series is return on June 15, 2020, with a brand new season on cable-and-satellite channel Kapamilya Channel.

The series re-aired on Kapamilya Channel's Kapamilya Gold afternoon block, Kapamilya Online Live (since November 1, 2022, replacing Magpahanggang Wakas) and A2Z's Zuper Hapon from January 2 to May 19, 2023, replacing the re-run of Be My Lady and was replaced by How to Move On in 30 Days.

== Reception ==
=== Ratings ===
Kantar Media National TV Ratings (9:20PM PST)
Pilot Episode	Finale Episode	Peak	Average
19.8% January 20, 2020	N/A; September 18, 2020	N/A	N/A

- The series aired nationwide on a cable channel/pay TV, which has a relatively smaller audience compared to other media broadcasters.

=== Controversies ===
==== Depiction of Butuan ====
The show came under fire early in the show's run for its perceived "unrealistic" and "offensive" depiction of Butuan. The scene in question was from the show's pilot episode showing the bombing of a market in the city. In a statement, Agusan del Norte 1st District Representative Lawrence Fortun asked ABS-CBN “to immediately air an appropriate disclaimer, review and reconsider the content and story elements of the teleserye in order not to further besmirch the reputation of our historic city.”

For its part, ABS-CBN apologized on January 23, 2020. Its statement read: “ABS-CBN would like to apologize to Agusan Del Norte Rep. Lawrence Fortun and the people of Butuan City if the scenes in the TV series ‘A Soldier’s Heart’ have offended them. While the incident portrayed in the series was fictitious, there was mention of the city name.”

“We would like to assure them that there was no deliberate intention to portray Butuan negatively in the show. We acknowledge that Butuan is one of the most beautiful and peaceful cities in the country,” it added.

On January 24, 2020, ABS-CBN executives headed by Cory Vidanes and Laurenti Dyogi met with Fortun to further clear the issue. After said meeting, Fortun noted that aside from airing specific disclaimers, ABS-CBN has removed all production elements, scenes, and references that may be offensive to Butuan.

== Side story ==
On August 19, 2021, RCD Narrative announced on their Twitter account that they will produce the BL side story Philjie’s Heart

== Awards and nominations ==
- Nominated for Best Soap/Telenovela in the Venice TV Award 2021
- Won for Best TV Series in the 5th GEMS-Hiyas ng Sining Awards
- Won for Best Drama Series (National Winner) in the 2020 Asian Academy Creative Awards

== See also ==
- List of programs broadcast by ABS-CBN
- List of Kapamilya Channel original programming
- List of Kapamilya Online Live original programming
- List of ABS-CBN Studios original drama series
