= Pamilya Roces =

2018 Philippine television drama series

- Title card
- Also known as: Family Jewels
- Genre: Drama
- Created by: Denoy Navarro-Punio
- Written by: Denoy Navarro-Punio; Kenneth De Leon; Evie Macapugay; Renei Dimla
- Directed by: Joel Lamangan
- Creative director: Roy Iglesias
- Starring: Carla Abellana; Gabbi Garcia; Sophie Albert; Shaira Diaz; Jasmine Curtis-Smith
- Theme music composer: Ann Figueroa
- Opening theme: "Tao Lang" by Maricris Garcia
- Country of origin: Philippines
- Original language: Tagalog
- No. of episodes: 50 (list of episodes)

Production
- Executive producer: Darling Pulido-Torres
- Editors: Robert Ryan Reyes; Ver Custodio
- Camera setup: Multiple-camera setup
- Running time: 24–41 minutes
- Production company: GMA Entertainment Group

Original release
- Network: GMA Network
- Release: October 8 – December 14, 2018

Pamilya Roces (transl. Roces family / international title: Family Jewels) is a 2018 Philippine television drama series broadcast by GMA Network. Directed by Joel Lamangan, it stars Carla Abellana, Gabbi Garcia, Sophie Albert, Shaira Diaz and Jasmine Curtis-Smith. It premiered on October 8, 2018 on the network's Telebabad line up. The series concluded on December 14, 2018, with a total of 50 episodes.

The series is streaming online on YouTube.

== Premise ==
Roces family have wealth and power. They are the owners of the biggest jewelry business in the country. While the patriarch has three families and when he suffers from a heart attack, his families rush to his side. The lives of three women and five sisters get complicated as their lives intertwined.

== Cast and characters ==
Cast

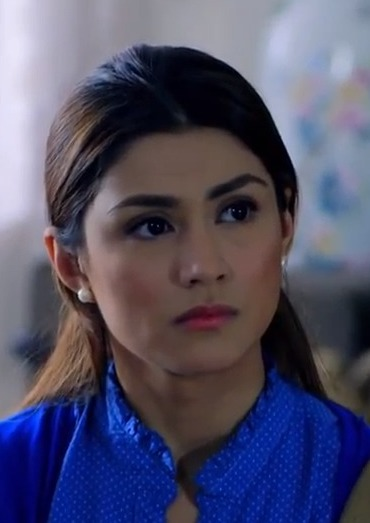
Carla Abellana

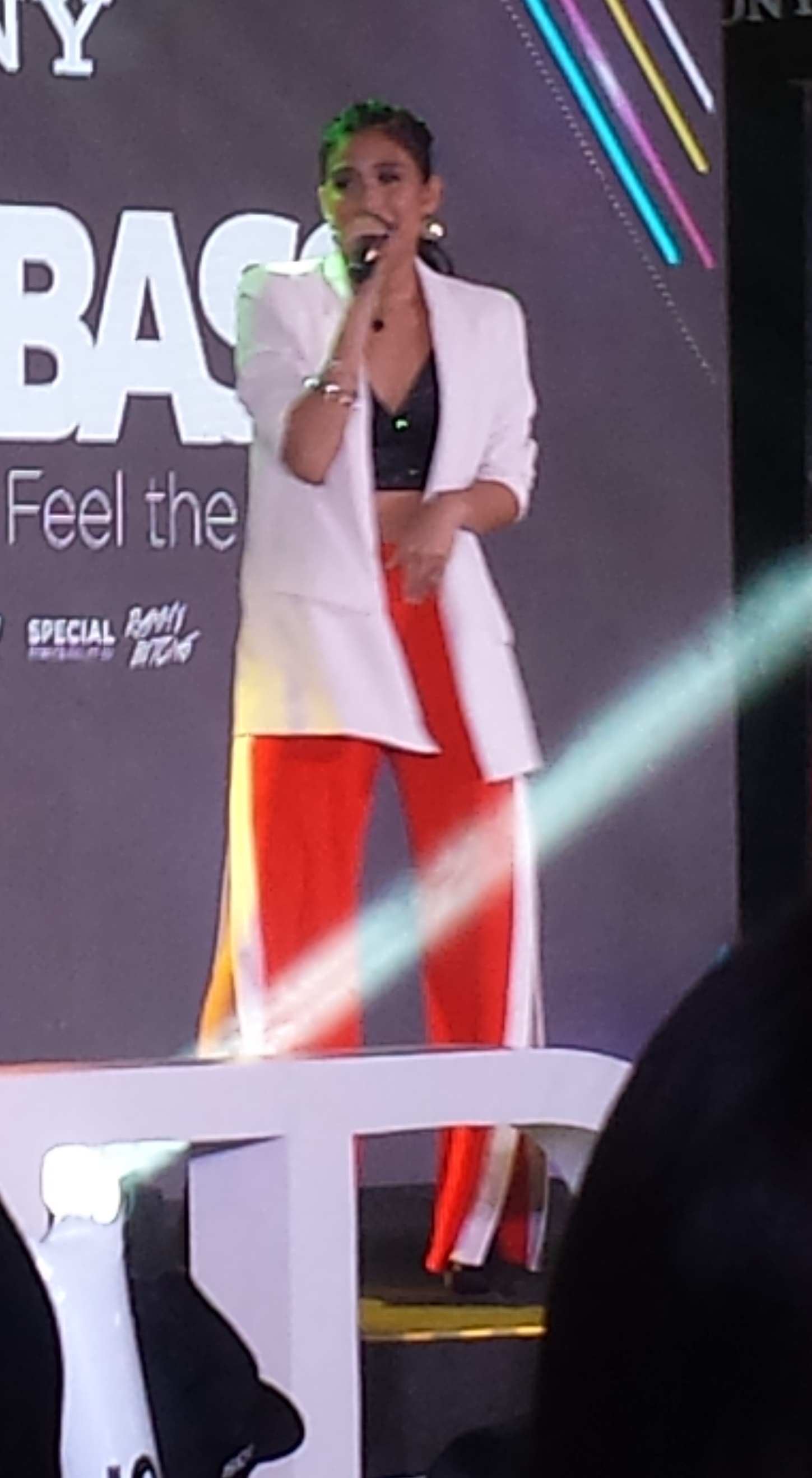
Gabbi Garcia

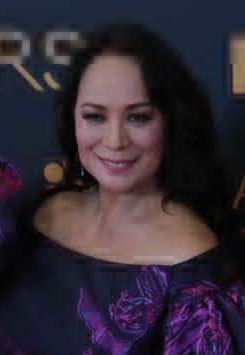
Gloria Diaz

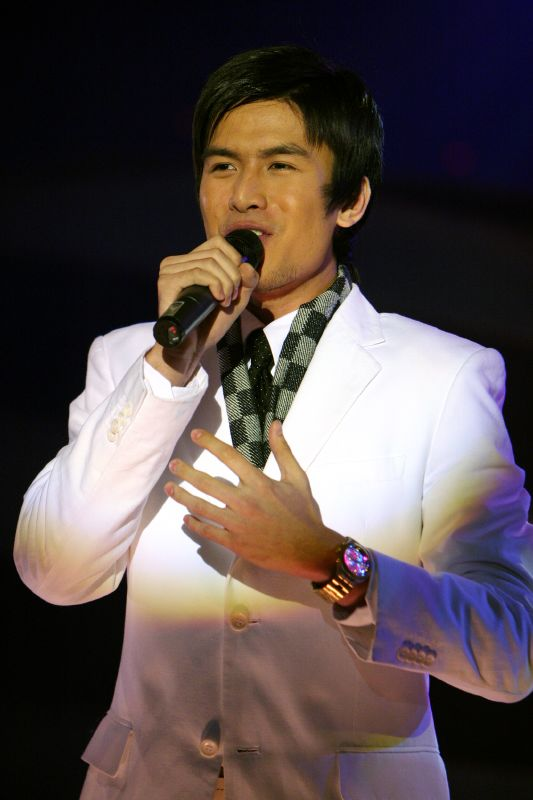
Christian Bautista

Lead cast

- Carla Abellana as Crystal Rose Austria Roces-Javellana
- Gabbi Garcia as Jade Austria Roces
- Sophie Albert as Amber Bolocboc Roces-Gomez
- Shaira Diaz as Amethyst "Amy" Renacia Roces
- Jasmine Curtis-Smith as Pearl Renacia Quirante

Supporting cast

- Roi Vinzon as Rodolfo "Rod" Gardamonte Roces
- Gloria Diaz as Natalia Austria-Roces
- Snooky Serna as Camilla Vera-Austria
- Elizabeth Oropesa as Violeta "Violet/Violy" Bolocboc
- Rocco Nacino as Hugoberto "Hugo" Ponciano Javellana
- Andre Paras as Gareth Austria
- Christian Bautista as Ralph Gomez
- Mika dela Cruz as Donnatella "Donna" Rosales
- Manolo Pedrosa as Hilario "Gil" Figueroa

Recurring cast

- Jim Pebanco as Val
- Arianne Bautista as Kate
- Julia Lee as Stella
- Frances Makil-Ignacio as Marilou "Lulu" Lucero
- Katrina Halili as Maria Eloisa "Maisa" Renacia Quirante / Maisa Sampaguita
- William Lorenzo as Virgil Quirante / Vermont

Guest cast

- Ana Roces as Lily Renacia
- Mike Tan as young Rodolfo
- Tony Mabesa as Manolo
- Jules dela Paz as Yves
- Angel Guardian as Zara
- Jana Trias as Betsy
- Renerich Ocon as Elvie
- Allysa del Real as Tiffany / Tiff
- Michael Angelo Lobrin as Winston Go
- Leonora Caño as Diane
- Nicole Donesa as Bebe
- Kristof Garcia as Tristan
- Jon Romano as Lando Macaraeg
- Karlo Duterte as Gordon

== Casting ==
Actress Teresita Marquez was cast to portray Amber Roces, and later backed out during pre-production due to the show's "sensitive" scenes. Actress Sophie Albert was hired as her replacement.

== Production ==
Principal photography concluded on December 10, 2018.

== Ratings ==
According to AGB Nielsen Philippines' Nationwide Urban Television Audience Measurement People in television homes, the pilot episode of Pamilya Roces earned a 7.4% rating. The final episode scored a 9.9% rating.
