= Moonlight Over Baler =

- Directed by: Gil Portes
- Written by: Eric Ramos
- Produced by: T-Rex Productions (Rex Tiri)
- Starring: Elizabeth Oropesa; Ellen Adarna; Vin Abrenica; Sophie Albert
- Production company: T-Rex Entertainment
- Release date: February 8, 2017
- Country: Philippines
- Language: Filipino
- Budget: P 45 million
- Box office: P 1.5 million

Moonlight Over Baler is a 2017 Filipino historic romantic film starring Elizabeth Oropesa, Ellen Adarna, Vin Abrenica and Sophie Albert. The film is directed by Gil Portes, written by Eric Ramos and is under the production of T-Rex Productions (Rex Tiri).

The film is shot in the historic town of Baler, Aurora.

The film was entered for the 2016 Metro Manila Film Festival but was not selected to be part of the festival's Magic 8.

== Synopsis ==
Set in the 1980s, the film tells the story of Fidela (Elizabeth Oropesa), a 65-year-old retired teacher who develops a special bond with a young Japanese photojournalist Kenji (Vin Abrenica), who has an uncanny resemblance to her lost love named Nestor (also played by Vin Abrenica). Nestor, who was about to marry Fidela in the 1940s, went off to fight in the war (World War II) and was killed.

Decades later, Fidela met Kenji who was covering the EDSA revolution in 1986 in Baler. She reminisced about her past as Kenji woos a local beauty named Rory (played by Ellen Adarna). Fidela helped Kenji surpass the challenges given to him by Rory to prove his sincere feelings towards her.

== Cast ==
=== Main ===
- Elizabeth Oropesa as Fidela
- Ellen Adarna as Aurora/Rory
- Vin Abrenica as Kenji/Nestor (dual role)
- Sophie Albert as the young Fidela

=== Supporting ===
- Daria Ramirez
- Menggie Cobarrubias
- Angie Ferro
- Kate Alejandrino
- Abel Estanislao
- Benj Bolivar
- Aaron Yanga
- Alvin Fortuna
- Dennies Coronel
- Benjie Felipe
- Jess Evardone
- Jun Nayra
- Blaine Medina
