= Sunday Funday (TV program) =

2012 Philippine defunct television musical variety show

- Genre: Variety show
- Created by: Associated Broadcasting Company
- Developed by: TV5 Entertainment Division
- Written by: Wado Siman
- Directed by: Al Quinn
- Presented by: Various Hosts and Performers
- Opening theme: "Paso (The Nini Anthem)"
- Composer: Sak Noel
- Country of origin: Philippines
- No. of episodes: 10

Production
- Executive producer: Faye Martel
- Running time: 1 hour

Original release
- Network: TV5
- Release: April 8 – June 10, 2012

Sunday Funday is a Philippine television variety show broadcast by TV5. Hosted by Joshua Davis, BJ Forbes, AJ Muhlach, Aki Torio, John Uy, Christian Samson, Rico dela Paz, Meg Imperial, Morissette, Nadine Lustre and Shy Carlos., it aired from April 8 to June 10, 2012, and was replaced by Game 'N Go.

== Hosts ==
- Joshua Davis
- BJ Forbes
- AJ Muhlach
- Aki Torio
- John Uy
- Christian Samson
- Rico dela Paz
- Meg Imperial
- Morissette
- Nadine Lustre
- Shy Carlos

== See also ==
- TV5
- List of programs broadcast by TV5 (Philippine TV network)
