= Third Eye (2012 TV series) =

- Title card
- Genre: Horror; Drama
- Created by: Associated Broadcasting Company
- Directed by: Lore Reyes
- Starring: Eula Caballero
- Country of origin: Philippines
- Original language: Tagalog
- No. of episodes: 13

Production
- Executive producer: Manuel V. Pangilinan
- Running time: 45 minutes

Original release
- Network: TV5
- Release: July 29 – October 21, 2012

Third Eye is a 2012 Philippine horror and suspense TV series broadcast by TV5. The series top-billed by Eula Caballero in the title role, alongside Lorna Tolentino, Victor Silayan, and Eddie Garcia. It aired from July 29 to October 21, 2012, replacing Super Sine Prime and was replaced by Sunday Blockbusters.

The series is inspired by characters based on Philippine folklore, mythology and pop culture.

== Plot ==
The story revolves on Cassandra, a young girl who investigates the mysterious disappearance of her boyfriend. In her quest to find and save him, she discovers her ability to see creatures of a different realm.

== Cast and characters ==
=== Main cast ===
- Eula Caballero as Cassandra

=== Supporting cast ===
- Lorna Tolentino as Rosanna
- Daniel Matsunaga as Lucas
- Eddie Garcia† as Lolo Gimo
- Victor Silayan as Adrian
- Jenny Miller as Sonia
- Clint Gabo as Dongbi
- Darlene Alquintos as Yuri

== See also ==
- List of TV5 (Philippine TV network) original programming
- Cassandra: Warrior Angel
