= Beki Boxer =

- Genre: Sports drama Comedy
- Written by: Renato L. Custodio, Jr.
- Directed by: Jade Castro; Monti L. Parungao
- Starring: Alwyn Uytingco; Vin Abrenica; Joross Gamboa; Claire Ruiz; Christian Vasquez; Candy Pangilinan; Kristel Moreno
- Opening theme: "Can This Be Love" by Smokey Mountain
- Country of origin: Philippines
- Original language: Tagalog
- No. of episodes: 68

Production
- Executive producer: Nelson L. Alindongan
- Running time: 30 minutes

Original release
- Network: TV5
- Release: March 31 – July 4, 2014

Related
- Totoy Bato; Kamao

Beki Boxer is a 2014 Philippine sports comedy-drama series broadcast by TV5. Directed by Jade Castro and Monti L. Parungao, it stars Alwyn Uytingco, Vin Abrenica, Joross Gamboa and Claire Ruiz. The series was considered as the 2nd gay-themed drama series on the primetime block after the success of My Husband's Lover. It aired on the network's primetime block from March 31 to July 4, 2014, replacing Let's Ask Pilipinas and was replaced by Bride of the Century.

== Cast ==
- Alwyn Uytingco as Rocky "The Tsunami" Ponciano
- Vin Abrenica as Renato "Atong" Villaflor/Marlon Villafor
- Danita Paner as Chloe
- Joross Gamboa as Madonna
- Claire Ruiz as Venus
- Christian Vasquez as Max
- Candy Pangilinan as Consuelo
- Cholo Barretto as Elorde
- Kristel Moreno as Jessa
- Onyok Velasco as Onyok
- John Regala as Dalmacio
- Alizon Andres as Gardo
- Jerald Napoles as Toto

=== Guest stars ===
- Aubrey Miles as Yvette
- Albie Casiño as Eric Ibañez
- Ryan Yllana as Beber
- Tina Monasterio as Clarissa
- Rain Prince Allan Quite as Young Rocky
- Elijah Maguindayao as Young Elorde
- Nonong "Bangkay" de Andres as Adonis
- Bekimon as Leyla
- Brent Manzano as James
- Ram De Leon as Sushmita
- Bong Uytico Jr. as Barang
- Alvin Anson as Antonio
- Denver Cuello as Marvin "The Hammerhead" Ortega
- Michael Farenas as Leonardo “Matador” Gonzales
- Juan Martin Elorde as Mike "Pitbull" Traje
- Edgar Gabejan as Bobby "The Silent Assassin" Delgado
- Aldred Gatchalian as Charles
- Buboy Fernandez as himself
- Dennis Laurente as Gordon Berdugo
- Luke Jickain as Dyanggo
- Danton Remoto as himself
- Rex Tso as Zhang "The Chameleon" Shin
- Isabelle de Leon as Isabelle Raymundo of Trenderas
- Katrina Velarde as Diva Salambangon of Trenderas
- Lara Maigue as Lara San Miguel of Trenderas
- Aaron Hewson as himself
- Ed Picson as himself

== Rocky's Professional Fight Results ==
- vs. Marvin "The Hammerhead" Ortega - Won via decision.
- vs. Leonardo "Matador" Gonzales - Won via knockout.
- vs. Mike "Pitbull" Traje - Won via disqualification.
- vs. Bobby "The Silent Assassin" Delgado - Lose via knockout.
- vs. Gordon Berdugo - Won via disqualification.
- vs. Renato "Atong" Villaflor - Won via decision.
- vs. Zhang "The Chameleon" Shin - Won via knockout.

== Awards and nominations ==
Year	Association	Award/Recognition	Category	Nominee	Result	Source
2015	Entertainment Press Society	6th Golden Screen TV Awards	Outstanding Performance by an Actor in a Drama Program	Alwyn Uytingco	Nominated	
