= Shaira Diaz =

Filipino actress (born 1995)

- Born: Shaira Mae Dela Cruz; May 3, 1995 (age 31); Las Piñas, Philippines
- Education: University of Perpetual Help System DALTA
- Occupations: Actress; model; singer; host
- Years active: 2012–present
- Agents: TV5 Talent Center (2012–2016); Sparkle GMA Artist Center (2018–present)
- Spouse: Edgar Allan Guzman (m. 2025)

YouTube information
- Channel: ShairaDiaz95
- Years active: 2016–present
- Subscribers: 152 thousand
- Views: 3.04 million
- Last updated: August 4, 2026

Shaira Mae Berlanga Dela Cruz-Guzman (born May 3, 1995), known professionally as Shaira Diaz, is a Filipino actress, television host, and entrepreneur. She is currently an exclusive artist of GMA Network under Sparkle GMA Artist Center.

== Early life and education ==
Shaira Mae Dela Cruz was born on May 3, 1995, in Las Piñas, Philippines. She has two siblings, a brother named Angelo and a sister named Sharmaine, both of whom share her interest in music and the arts. Her involvement in the entertainment industry began at a young age, participating in singing and dancing competitions at school and in her local community. She also became involved in theater, which contributed to her decision to pursue a career in acting.

Diaz finished a degree in Marketing Management at University of Perpetual Help System DALTA in Las Piñas. Prior to graduation, she was recognized by the university as an outstanding Business Administration student.

== Career ==
Diaz started her acting career when she joined the talent show Artista Academy of TV5, where she finished as one of the finalists. She made her acting debut in a supporting role in the 2013 fantasy series Kidlat. She then appeared in shows such as Confessions of a Torpe, Madam Chairman and various episodes of Wattpad Presents. In 2015, she starred in the Baker King, which is the Philippine adaptation of the 2010 Korean drama Bread, Love and Dreams.

In 2018, she inked an exclusive contract with GMA Network. She also signed a management contract with GMA Artist Center. Her first project with the network is a guest appearance in the afternoon series Contessa. She later joined the cast of the series Pamilya Roces. In 2019, Diaz starred in the movie Because I Love You opposite David Licauco.

In 2021, she renewed her contract with GMA Artist Center. She starred in the second season of the drama anthology I Can See You entitled On My Way to You! where she paired with Ruru Madrid. The following year, she reunited with Madrid in the action series Lolong where she played his love interest. In 2023, she joined the morning show Unang Hirit as one of its hosts. Diaz and Licuaco paired up once again in the romantic film Without You. Later that year, she starred in the romance drama series Lovers & Liars.

== Personal life ==
Diaz is married to actor Edgar Allan Guzman since their wedding at St. Benedict Parish Westgrove, Silang, Cavite on August 14, 2025. They began dating each other in 2013. They became engaged in December 2021. (Note: Publicly recognized in February 2024) The couple revealed that they have practiced celibacy or sexual abstinence throughout their relationship until they get married. The couple married on August 14, 2025, in a ceremony held in Silang, Cavite. The couple later opened their branch of Baa Baa Thai Tea, a beverage business, in BF International Village, Las Piñas.

In October 2024, Diaz underwent a laparoscopic appendectomy to remove her inflamed appendix.

== Filmography ==
=== Film ===
Year	Title	Role	Note	Ref.
2013	Kaleidoscope World	Dance crew member		
2017	Trip Ubusan: The Lolas vs. Zombies	Catherine "Cath" Lacerna	Supporting cast	
2018	Wooden Chair	Teacher Gina		
2019	Promdi	Bettina		
2019	Because I Love You	Maria Sunita "Summer" Andres	First lead role	
2021	Coming Home	Sally Librada	Supporting cast	
2023	Without You	Ria	Second lead role	

=== Television ===
Year	Title	Role(s)
2012	Artista Academy	Contestant / Finalist
2013	Tropa Mo Ko Unli	Herself
2013	Kidlat	Francine / Frosta
2013–2014	Madam Chairman	Katherine "Kakay" de Guzman
2014	Wattpad Presents: Mr. Popular Meets Miss Nobody	Chelsea Torres
2014	Wattpad Presents: Mr. Popular Meets Miss Nobody 2 (Still in Love)	Chelsea Torres
2014	Confessions of a Torpe	Lovely Mabuti
2015	Happy Truck ng Bayan	Host
2015	Wattpad Presents: The Ignorant Princess	Therese Prietto
2015	Wattpad Presents: I'm in Love with a DOTA Player	Tin Arevallo
2015	Wattpad Presents: The Magic in You	Princess Madrigal
2015	Baker King	Sunshine Robles Gatchalian
2016	Wattpad Presents: Salamin	Laila
2016	Wattpad Presents: 300 Days with the Contract Husband	Yumiko "Yumi" Perez
2016	The Mysterious Case of Ana Madrigal	Ana Madrigal
2016–2017	Trops	Mandy Santiago-Tolentino
2018	Wowowin	Co-host
2018	Contessa	Ces Hidalgo
2018	One Hugot Away: Walang Label	Ella
2018	Magpakailanman: Nakawin Natin ang Bawat Sandali	Lisa
2018	Pamilya Roces	Amy Roces
2019	Dear Uge: Martyr'ang Matibay	Susan
2019	Wish Ko Lang!: Against All Odds	Lorlie
2019	Maynila: My Charming Prince	Odhesa
2019	Magpakailanman: Psychic from Dumaguete	Rasha Mae Sarne
2019	Daig Kayo ng Lola Ko: Squad Goals	Vina
2019	Studio 7	Performer
2019	Love You Two	Samantha "Sam" Batungbakal-Marquez
2020	Dear Uge: Ganda Mo Teh!	Alma
2020	Magpakailanman: Dapat Ka Bang Mahalin?	Jasmine
2020	Magpakailanman: Viral Frontliner	Lorraine Pingol
2021	Sleepless: The Series	
2021	The Lost Recipe	Julienne Buenavidez
2021	I Can See You: On My Way to You!	Racquel "Raki" Buena
2021	Magpakailanman: Gua Ai Di, I Love You	Melody
2021	Regal Studio Presents: Ikaw si Ako, Ako si Ikaw	Janice
2021	Dear Uge: Sleep Baby Sleep	Baby
2021	Tadhana: Hulog ng Langit	Angel
2022	Magpakailanman: Sa Ngalan ng Anak	Ellen
2022; 2025	Lolong	Elisa "Elsie" Dominguez-Candelaria
2022	Bubble Gang	Guest
2022	Abot-Kamay na Pangarap	Olivia "Olive" Garcia
2023	Tadhana: Hubad na Katotohanan	Julia
2023	Magpakailanman: The Lost Boy	Maris
2023	Open 24/7	Guest
2023–present	Unang Hirit	Host
2023–present	It's Showtime	Recurring guest
2023–2024	Lovers & Liars	Annika "Nika" Aquino
2024	Running Man Philippines	Guest
2024	Regal Studio Presents: Love Next Door	Joy
