= Six Part Invention =

Filipino pop-rock band

- Origin: Philippines
- Genres: Pinoy pop; pop rock
- Years active: 2006–present
- Labels: Alpha Music; Universal Records; Star Music
- Members: Rey Cantong; Kaye Malana-Cantong; Cookie Taylo; Elijah Glenn De Vera; Ebe Parco
- Past members: Andy de la Cruz; Tag Cantong; Zach Alcasid

Six Part Invention is a Filipino pop-rock band. They record original songs and covers. The group works as the resident band for television programs on ABS-CBN, such as the game show Everybody, Sing!. They also performed as the official live band for P-pop group Bini until 2026 after Kaogma Festival. It currently consists of Rey Cantong (Musical Director, Vocals, Guitars & Programming), Kaye Malana-Cantong (Vocals), Cookie Taylo (Bass Guitar & Precussions), Elijah Glenn De Vera (Keyboards, Piano & Guitars) & Ebe Parco (Drums, Precussions).

== History ==
Brothers Rey and Tag Cantong started the band. Rey is the lead singer and guitarist, while Tag plays drums. Rey met singer Kaye Malana at a gig where she performed onstage. She joined the group and later married Rey.

Rey Cantong explained the name "Six Part Invention" comes from their musical setup. The band had four members but used a sequencer for extra sounds. They counted the sequencer as two parts. The four members plus the two digital parts equaled six.

In 2010, the band released the album Songs of D-Votion under Alpha Music. The title refers to the music, as the songs were written in the key of D or related keys. Rey Cantong wrote and arranged the tracks.

The song "Falling in Love" became the theme song for the ABS-CBN series Agua Bendita. The band also recorded "Umaasa Lang Sa 'Yo", which was used for the series Sana Maulit Muli.

Six Part Invention signed with Universal Records in 2013. They released Stripped and Covered, an album of cover songs. It included acoustic versions of 1980s and '90s rock songs, such as "The Flame" by Cheap Trick and "Two Steps Behind" by Def Leppard. Universal Records released the album in Singapore, Malaysia, Thailand, and Indonesia.

In June 2021, the band began playing as the resident band for the game show Everybody, Sing!. Rey Cantong also arranges music for the TV shows ASAP and It's Showtime.

Six Part Invention was the official live band for the group BINI until 2026 after Kaogma Festival as their last live appearance with the girl group. They played with the group at the One Dream concert in 2021 and the Grand BINIverse concert in 2024. Rey and Kaye Cantong provide backing vocals for the group during dance routines.

The band released the single "Tama Pa Ba?" on March 22, 2024. Jeremy Glinoga and Kiko Salazar composed the song.

In October 2025, Six Part Invention released the single "Wasak na Puso" under Star Music. Rey Cantong wrote and produced the track. The music video featured BINI member Gwen Apuli. The video tells the story of an Overseas Filipino Worker (OFW) father separated from his children.

== Members ==
=== Current members ===
- Rey Cantong – musical director, vocals, guitars, programming (2006-present)
- Kaye Malana-Cantong – vocals (2006-present)
- Cookie Taylo – bass guitar, percussions (2017-present)
- Elijah Glenn De Vera - keyboards, piano, guitars (touring musician 2017-2025) (2025-present)
- Ebe Parco - drums, percussion (touring musician 2023-2025) (2025-present)

=== Former members ===
- Andy de la Cruz – bass (2006-2017)
- Tag Cantong - drums, precussion (2006-2024)
- Zach Alcasid - drums, percussion (2025)

== Discography ==
=== Albums ===
- Six Part Invention (2006)
- Songs of D-Votion (2010)
- Stripped and Covered (2013)
- Always and Ever (2015)
- K1N5E (2021)

=== Singles ===
- "Falling in Love"
- "Umaasa Lang Sa 'Yo"
- "The Flame" (Cover)
- "Tama Pa Ba?" (2024)
- "Wasak na Puso" (2025)
