= BF International Village =

Barangay in Las Piñas, Metro Manila, Philippines

BF International Village–CAA BF International
- Barangay
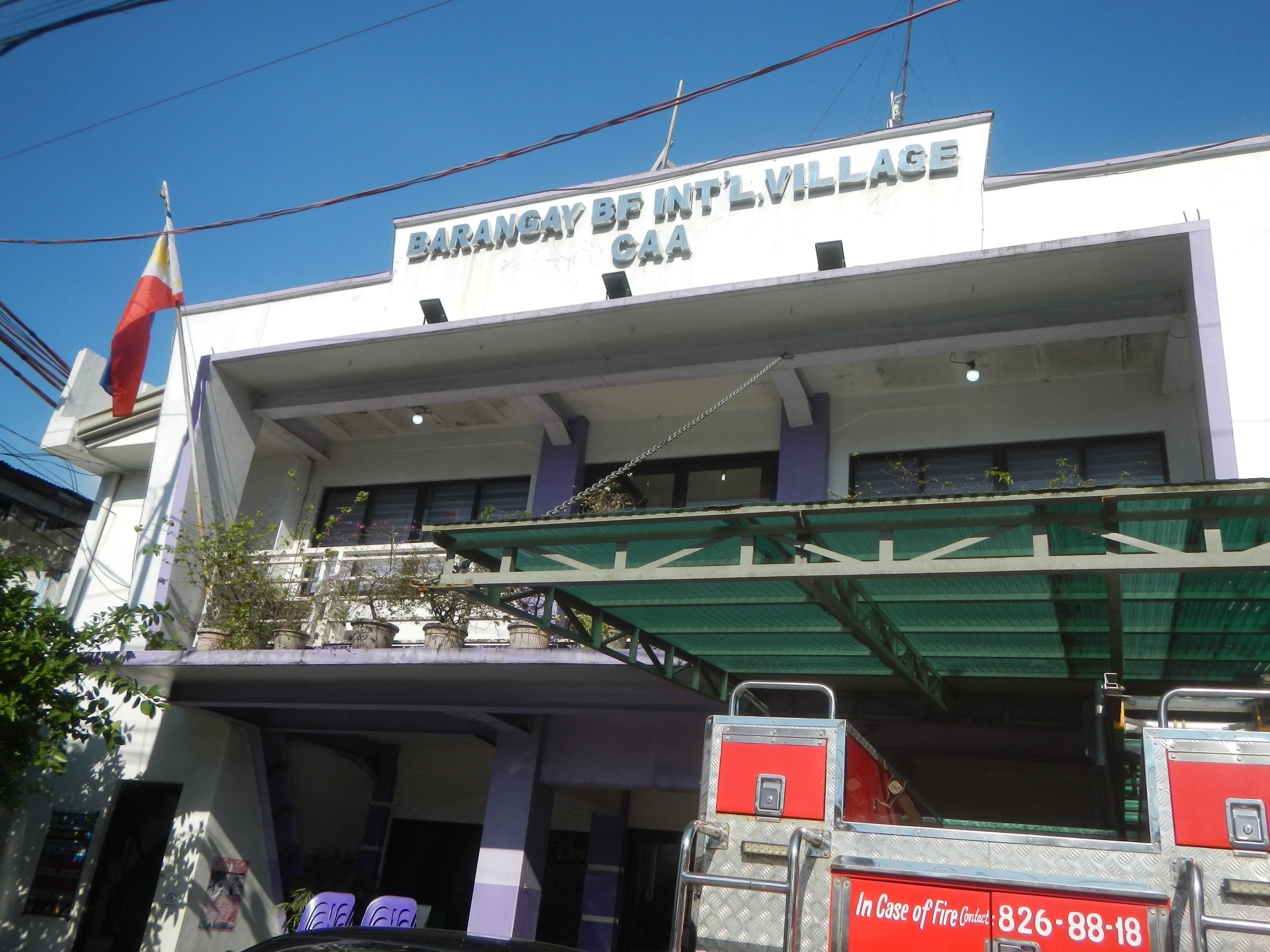
- Barangay Hall
- Interactive map of BF International Village–CAA
- Location within Metro Manila
- Coordinates: 14°26′59.64″N 120°59′58.6″E
- Country: Philippines
- Region: National Capital Region
- City: Las Piñas
- District: 1st Legislative district of Las Pinas
- Established: April 3, 1978

Government
  - Type: Barangay
  - Barangay Captain: Asuncion Aguilar

Area
  - Total: 2.17 km^{2} (0.84 sq mi)

Population (2020)
  - Total: 81,739
  - Density: 37,700/km^{2} (97,600/sq mi)
- Time zone: UTC+8 (PST)
- Postal Code: 1740
- Area code: 02

BF International Village is a barangay in the first district of Las Piñas, Metro Manila, Philippines.

As of 2020, BF International Village has a population of 77,264 people spread over 2.17 km^{2} (0.84 sq mi) of land. The barangay has a total 60,000 households, 20,000 families, 50,000 registered voters and 251 precincts.

The barangay is bordered by Gatchalian Village-Barangay Manuyo Dos to the north; San Antonio V7-Barangay Pulanglupa Dos to the east; Barangay San Isidro, Parañaque on the west; and J. Aguilar Avenue, Barangay Pamplona Tres to the south.

== History ==
BF International Village was created as a barangay out of Barangay Talon, by virtue of Presidential Decree No. 1334 signed by then-President Ferdinand Marcos on April 3, 1978. It was created primarily to accelerate the pace socio-economic development program by its officials.

== Facilities ==
BF International Village is currently a highly urbanized Barangay. From flooded and muddy streets, 97% of its roads, pathways and alleys are concreted with a good drainage system. Facilities include one Lying-in Center, four Health Centers, four Covered Courts, two Public Elementary School, two Public High School, one Public Senior High School, one Police Community Precinct, four Solid Waste Management Centers, 30 Barangay Volunteer Tanod Outposts, Senior Citizen's Office and Person With Disability office, one Reading Center, 12 Day Care Centers, one Multipurpose Hall and one Barangay Hall Bldg.

As urban development's come from the neighboring barangay and cities, the majority of the residents are among the second class, middle earners, and small-scale entrepreneurs.

== Education ==
The Southville International School and Colleges located within the barangay.
