= Artista Academy =

Television series in the Philippines

- Title card featuring the show logo and slogan
- Genre: Reality show
- Written by: Paolo Aquino; Joseph Bolintiam
- Directed by: Mac C. Alejandre; Alex Sabater; Nico Faustino
- Presented by: Cesar Montano; Marvin Agustin
- Judges: Lorna Tolentino; Gelli de Belen
- Country of origin: Philippines
- Original language: Tagalog
- No. of seasons: 1
- No. of episodes: 78

Production
- Executive producers: James dela Vega; Faye Martel
- Producers: Li-An delos Reyes; Joselle Salvador
- Production locations: Grand Audition: June 19, 2012 at Smart Araneta Coliseum; TV5 Delta Studio, Quezon City, Philippines
- Editors: Raymond Pangilinan; Joey Romares; Kristian Paolo Selga

Original release
- Network: TV5
- Release: July 30 – October 27, 2012

Artista Academy is a Philippine television reality competition show broadcast by TV5. Hosted by Cesar Montano and Marvin Agustin, it aired from July 30 to October 27, 2012, replacing Runaway and Super Sine Prime and was replaced by The Amazing Race Philippines. The show aims to find new talented actors and actresses, with ₱20 million worth of prizes and an artist management contract at stake. The show had its one-time Grand Audition at the Smart Araneta Coliseum on June 19, 2012, for all aspirants between 16 and 22 years old.

Each of the 16 aspirants will undergo training at the AATA as special scholars. Noted experts from the Philippine entertainment industry and veteran artists will tutor the candidates.

A revival of the series has been announced in a trade event for 2026.

== Faculty ==
=== Hosts ===
- Cesar Montano (Artista Academy Live Exams)
- Marvin Agustin (Artista Academy Primetime)
- Mr. Fu (Close-Up Artista Academy Breaktime)
- Valeen Montenegro (Close-Up Artista Academy Breaktime / Live Exams)

=== Executive committee ===
- Mac Alejandre
- Wilma Galvante
- Perci Intalan

=== Live exam critics ===
- Lorna Tolentino
- Gelli de Belen
- Wilma Galvante
- Mac Alejandre

=== Academy advisers ===
- Joel Lamangan
- Louie Ocampo
- Georcelle Dapat-Sy

=== Guest mentors ===
- Boots Anson-Roa
- Leo Martinez
- Moy Ortiz
- Soxie Topacio
- Lorna Tolentino

== Top 16 students ==
Key	Top 8 Boys	Top 8 Girls

Preferred Name	Full Name	Hometown	Preferred Name	Full Name	Hometown
Akihiro Blanco	Felix Jun Blanco (Akihiro Ishii)		Chanel Morales	Chanel Morales	
Alberto Bruno	Alberto Bruno de los Reyes		Julia Quisumbing	Julia Quisumbing	
Benjo Leoncio	Benigno Jose Leoncio		Malak So Shdifat	Malak So Shdifat	
Brent Manzano	Bryan Manzano		Marvelous Alejo	Margarette Veronica Louise Lim	
Chris Leonardo	Christopher Leonardo		Nicole Estrada	Marie Angelou Nicole Estrada	
Jon Orlando	Jonathan Michael Orlando		Shaira Mae	Shaira Mae Berlanga dela Cruz	
Mark Neumann	Mark Phillip Baba Neumann		Sophie Albert	Bianca Regina Lyttle Reyes	
Vin Abrenica	Alvin Guiang Abrenica		Stephanie Rowe	Stephanie Rowe	

== Elimination chart ==
Live Examination Results
Student	Live Exam 1	Live Exam 2	Live Exam 3	Live Exam 4	Live Exam 5	Live Exam 6	Live Exam 7	Wildcard Exam	Final Exam
Vin Abrenica	Top 3	Top 3	Top 3	Top 3	Safe	Safe	Finalist	Already Advanced	Best Actor
Sophie Albert	Safe	Top 3	Safe	Safe	Safe	Safe	Finalist	Already Advanced	Best Actress
Akihiro Blanco	Safe	Safe	Top 3	Safe	Safe	Safe	Finalist	Already Advanced	Final 6
Chanel Morales	Top 3	Top 3	Top 3	Top 3	Most Confident	Safe	Finalist	Already Advanced	Final 6
Mark Neumann	Safe	Safe	Safe	Safe	Safe	Safe	Danger 4	Wildcard	Final 6
Shaira Mae	Safe	Safe	Safe	Safe	Safe	Safe	Danger 4	Wildcard	Final 6
Benjo Leoncio	Safe	Bottom 3	Safe	Bottom 3	Bottom 3	Bottom 3	Danger 4	Wildcard Finalist	Kicked out
Malak So Shdifat	Safe	Safe	Safe	Safe	Safe	Safe	Danger 4	Wildcard Finalist	Kicked out
Alberto Bruno	Bottom 3	Safe	Safe	Safe	Most Improved	Bottom 6	Kicked out		
Stephanie Rowe	Bottom 3	Safe	Safe	Bottom 3	Bottom 3	Bottom 6	Tropang Kick out	Wildcard Finalist	Kicked out
Nicole Estrada	Safe	Safe	Bottom 5	Safe	Bottom 3	Bottom 6	Tropang Kick out	Wildcard Finalist	Kicked out
Marvelous Alejo	Top 3	Safe	Bottom 5	Top 3	Safe	Bottom 3	Tropang Kick out	Wildcard Finalist	Kicked out
Brent Manzano	Safe	Bottom 3	Bottom 5	Bottom 3	Kicked out		Tropang Kick out	Wildcard Finalist	Kicked out
Jon Orlando	Bottom 3	Safe	Bottom 5	Kicked out			Tropang Kick out	Wildcard Finalist	Kicked out
Julia Quisumbing	Safe	Safe	Bottom 5	Kicked out					
Chris Leonardo	Safe	Bottom 3	Kicked out				Tropang Kick out	Wildcard Finalist	Kicked out
Live Examination Result	None	Chris Leonardo; Kicked out	Julia Quisumbing; Kicked out	Brent Manzano; Kicked out	None	Marvelous Alejo; Nicole Estrada; Stephanie Rowe; Alberto Bruno; Kicked out	Akihiro Blanco; Vin Abrenica; Chanel Morales; Sophie Albert; Advanced to Finals	Mark Neumann; Shaira Mae; Wildcard Finalists	Vin Abrenica; Sophie Albert; Winners
Live Examination Result	None	Chris Leonardo; Kicked out	Jon Orlando; Kicked out	Brent Manzano; Kicked out	None	Marvelous Alejo; Nicole Estrada; Stephanie Rowe; Alberto Bruno; Kicked out	Akihiro Blanco; Vin Abrenica; Chanel Morales; Sophie Albert; Advanced to Finals	Chris Leonardo; Jon Orlando; Brent Manzano; Marvelous Alejo; Nicole Estrada; Stephanie Rowe; Failed to Advance; Benjo Leoncio; Malak So Shdifat; Kicked out	Akihiro Blanco; Chanel Morales; Mark Neumann; Shaira Mae; Final 6
Notes	^{Note 1}	^{None}	^{Note 2}	^{None}	^{Note 3}	^{Note 4}	^{Note 5}	^{Note 6}	^{None}

Color Keys

- – Top 8 scholar male students
- – Top 8 scholar female students
- – Top scholar student in the Live and Final Exam; Scholar student advanced to the Finals
- – Received a Special Award
- – Proclaimed as the Grand Winner (Best Actor/Best Actress)
- – Final 6 scholar student
- – Wildcard Finalist and advanced to the Finals
- – Previously Kicked out and then competed as a Wildcard Finalist
- – Ranked as one of the Bottom group
- – Kicked out (Eliminated)
- – Dropped out (Withdraw/Quit/Ejected)

Notes

1. No eliminations, but there was the Overall Bottom Three.
2. Alejo and Quisumbing were hospitalized, therefore they were absent on the live exam and got 50. They were relegated automatically to the Bottom Five.
3. No eliminations, the Overall Top Three and Bottom Three were not revealed. Special awards were given to Chanel and Alberto, the Most Confident and Most Improved, respectively.
4. There was a mass kick-out. The Overall Top Three was not revealed.
5. Four of the scholars advanced to the Finals. There will be a play-off for the last two Final seats between the four others (Danger 4), plus six wild card contenders (Tropang Kick out).
6. Play-off for the last two Final seats between the four others, plus six wild card contenders.

== Ratings ==
Season	Premiered	Ended	Season Premiere	Rank		Season Finale	Rank		Media	Source
Season	Premiered	Ended	Season Premiere	Timeslot	Primetime	Season Finale	Timeslot	Primetime	Media	Source
1	July 30, 2012	October 27, 2012	4.3%	#3	< #10	11.6%	#2	#8	AGB Nielsen	
1	July 30, 2012	October 27, 2012	3.1%	#3	< #10	6.4%	#5	< #10	Kantar Media - TNS	

== See also ==
- List of TV5 (Philippine TV network) original programming
