= Game 'N Go =

2012–13 Philippine defunct television variety game show

- Title card
- Genre: Variety show
- Written by: Denjou Elgincolin; Noel Escondo; Anna Corina Joven; Clark Llaga; Raymond Navarro; Jovany Ponce
- Directed by: Ding Bolaños (studio); Butch Llige (remote); Robert Quebral (remote)
- Presented by: Joey de Leon; Edu Manzano; Gelli de Belen; Shalani Soledad-Romulo; Arnell Ignacio; Daniel Matsunaga
- Opening theme: Game 'N Go Theme
- Country of origin: Philippines
- Original languages: Filipino; English
- No. of episodes: 34

Production
- Executive producers: Rose Camia; Liza Montenegro
- Production locations: TV5 Delta Studio, (Quezon Avenue, Quezon City)
- Editors: Marvin Rellamas; Ting Valenciano
- Running time: Sundays at 11:30 am to 2:30 pm (PST)
- Production company: Fremantle Media

Original release
- Network: TV5
- Release: June 17, 2012 – February 3, 2013

Related
- Sunday Funday; Lokomoko U

Game 'N Go (lit. Game and Go) is a Philippine television variety show broadcast by TV5. Hosted by Joey de Leon, Edu Manzano, Arnell Ignacio, Gelli de Belen, Shalani Soledad-Romulo,Daniel Matsunaga, Monika Sta. Maria and Jeffrey Espiritu, it aired from June 17, 2012 to February 3, 2013, replacing Sunday Funday.

== Hosts ==
=== Main hosts ===
- Joey de Leon
- Edu Manzano
- Arnell Ignacio
- Gelli de Belen
- Shalani Soledad-Romulo

=== Co-hosts ===
- Daniel Matsunaga
- Monika Sta. Maria
- Jeffrey Espiritu

=== Featuring ===
- GAGA Girls
- GNG Dancers
- Nga Nga Girls
- Game 'N Go Gang
- Artista Academy Final 6 Students

== Segments ==
- True or Fall
- Yugyug Tube
- Pritong Pares
- Face It
- Tsitsinelasin Kita
- Sing-Galing Go
- Versusan Tayo!
- Game 'N Go-cery

== See also ==
- TV5
- List of TV5 (Philippine TV network) original programming
