= Joey Paras =

Filipino actor and musician (1978–2023)

- Born: Joseph Estrada Paras; February 7, 1978; Manila, Philippines
- Died: October 29, 2023 (aged 45)
- Occupations: Actor; Theater Director; Filmmaker; Singer; Writer; Playwright; Film Producer; TV Host
- Years active: 2006–2023
- Known for: Sunday PINASaya Bekikang: Ang Nanay Kong Beki, IGIB, Ang Kaibigan Ni Imaginary F.

Joseph Estrada Paras (February 7, 1978 – October 29, 2023), also known as Joey Paras, was a Filipino actor, filmmaker, singer, screenwriter, playwright, and television host.

Paras was a multi-awarded stage and film actor; as well as a television actor and host. Being part of the theater guild Tanghalang Pilipino, he appeared in a Zsa Zsa Zaturnnah musical.

In the entertainment industry, he became known in Cinemalaya Independent Film Festival entries, indie films Last Supper No. 3 (2009) and Babagwa (The Spider's Lair; 2013). His supporting roles in the latter, as well as in Dance of the Steelbars, led to recognitions from some award giving bodies. He played the lead role in his launching film, Bekikang: Ang Nanay Kong Beki, in 2013.

Paras was also a playwright and theater director; as well as a screenwriter and film director, whose works were mostly featured in local and international film festivals, notably the internationally-awarded Ang Kaibigan ni Imaginary F and short film Igib in 2020, where he won his first best director award at the annual FilMay International Short Film Festival in North Macedonia.

He was the playwright behind "Bawal Tumawid, Nakakamatay", one of the plays selected to be produced on stage in the seventh edition of Virgin Labfest (VLF). His rise to fame started in the movie scene when he played the lead role in the film Last Supper Number 3 which received the MTRCB Awards Best Comedy Film for 2010 and Cinemalaya 2009 Best Film.

== Early and personal life ==
Paras finished Bachelor of Arts in Communication Arts at the University of Santo Tomas in 1998.

Paras was involved in arts since age 12, when he began writing stage plays and scripts, particularly for school plays. As he later revealed in an interview, at that age, he once auditioned to be part of the group Smokey Mountain.

Paras later admitted he knew being gay as early as age 4.

Before becoming an actor, he used to be an Overseas Filipino Worker (OFW) as a HOTEL LOUNGE SINGER in a lounge group named CICADA where they used to perform in Grand Hyatt Seoul, South Korea and Grand Hyatt Beijing, China. He worked abroad for several years until they disbanded.

== Career ==
=== Music career ===
Paras was the vocalist of the band, The Groove. Later, he had his own, Dash, which performed even abroad.

=== Theatrical career ===
Paras had his theater career since his college years; at age 17, he was accepted for a theater course in Tanghalang Pilipino, the theater guild of the Cultural Center of the Philippines. At that time as well, Paras worked as an acting coach and a workshop facilitator for children in Tanghalang Pilipino and the El Niño de Salambao Academy.

Prior to entering the film industry, Paras began his acting career as a stage actor from Tanghalang Pilipino. He later joined numerous productions, eventually being noted with his performance in the 2006 rerun of the musical version of a comic character entitled Zsazsa Zaturnnah Ze Muzikal.

In the Aliw Awards of 2008, he was named Best Stage Actor in a Straight Play for Ang Bayot, Ang Meranao at ang Habal-Habal sa isang Nakakabagot na Paghihintay sa Kanto ng Lanao del Norte, a Virgin Labfest play. He wrote another play, Bawal Tumawid, Nakakamatay.

He was also a playwright; and directed more than thirty theater plays.

=== Film career ===
Paras also played roles in several films. He rose to fame in the indie films after being discovered in Zsazsa Zaturnnah by independent filmmaker Veronica Velasco, who then cast him in the 2009 drama comedy Last Supper No. 3, which won best film at that year's Cinemalaya Independent Film Festival and best comedy film at the 1st MTRCB Awards the following year, with the role earning him a number of Best Actor nominations in 2010. He also played the supporting role in the 2013 film Babagwa (Spider's Web or The Spider's Lair), where he won the Best Supporting Actor awards from the Cinemalaya and Gawad Tanglaw. For prison movie Dance of the Steel Bars, he won Best Performance by an Actor in a Supporting Role from (Enpress) Golden Screen Awards.

Entering mainstream films, in 2013, he played the lead role in his launching film, Bekikang: Ang Nanay Kong Beki, directed by his mentor, Wenn Deramas.

After doing so in theater plays, he also wrote and directed films and had joined local film festivals; he reportedly created about three full length films and almost thirty short films. His works include:

- Hantu, an indie horror film, in 2012.
- Wala na Bang Ibang Title?, a full length indie socio-political film which he first wrote and directed, and was a 2014 Quezon City International Pink (Film) Festival entry. For the film, his mentors, fellow directors Deramas and Soxie Topacio, played the lead roles.
- Ang Kaibigan ni Imaginary F., in 2020, was the first to join five international film festivals, claiming awards, prior to being an entry for Sinag Maynila film festival.
- Igib, in 2020, was also eventually featured in various film festivals. It was featured in India and in North Macedonia, where Paras won his first best director award in the FilMay International Short Film Festival.

=== Television career ===
Paras had been in the entertainment industry; at age 12, Paras first appeared on television through GMA-7 Bulilit Show and an episode of Dear Teacher on IBC-13.

He was later featured in several television series in major networks, first in Maging Sino Ka Man (ABS-CBN) and then, Ikaw Sana (GMA Network), as well as in TV5. He was the co-host of GMA weekly show Sunday PinaSaya.

=== As an advocate ===
An advocate for local theater and film actors, Paras founded the Teatro Expedicion de Filipinas, an organization supporting new young actors from underprivileged areas, providing free acting workshops, and staging original theater works; as well as the Powerhouse Ensemble which offers free production training.

== Later life and death ==
In 2016, Paras revealed in an interview having a heart condition, which he said in another interview in 2020 his main reason to temporarily leave the entertainment industry. He underwent his first angioplasty operation by then.

He then underwent heart surgery in 2018. In 2020, he was confined in St. Luke's Medical Center in Quezon City after being diagnosed with COVID-19; he had another angioplasty operation later.

Paras died on October 29, 2023, at the age of 45.

== Filmography ==
=== Film ===
| Year | Title | Role |
|---|---|---|
| 2009 | Last Supper No. 3 | Wilson Nañawa |
| 2010 | Working Girls | Connie's Production Staff |
| 2010 | I Do | Clerk |
| 2010 | White House | Jerry |
| 2011 | Bahay Bata | Don |
| 2012 | Bwakaw | Tracy |
| 2012 | Sisterakas | Bonbon |
| 2013 | Bromance: My Brother's Romance | Beergin |
| 2013 | Dance of the Steel Bars | Allona |
| 2013 | The Spider's Lair | Marney |
| 2013 | Momzillas | Tito |
| 2013 | Bekikang: Ang Nanay Kong Beki | Victorio "Beki" |
| 2014 | Maria Leonora Teresa | Augusto |
| 2014 | Moron 5.2: The Transformation | Cong. King |
| 2014 | Wala Na Bang Ibang Title? | |
| 2015 | Wang Fam | Cocoy |
| 2016 | Lumayo Ka Nga sa Akin | Aling Minda |
| 2016 | Working Beks | Mandy |
| 2019 | Born Beautiful | Pastor Donald |
| 2019 | And Ai, Thank You | Jefferson |
| 2021 | Ayuda Babes | Mama Rita |
| 2024 | My Sassy Girl | |

=== Television ===
- Maging Sino Ka Man (2006) as Sionny
- SRO Cinemaserye: Rowena Joy (2009)
- Ikaw Sana (2009) as Afi
- Dahil May Isang Ikaw (2009) as Manolo Meloto
- The Last Prince (2010) as Salim
- Maalaala Mo Kaya
  - Bola (2009) as Budi (Vice Ganda 's best friend)
  - Internet Shop (2011) as Bading
- I Heart You, Pare! (2011) as Serbeza
- Sinner or Saint (2011) as Gerdo "Gigi" Manalo
- Daldalita (2011) as Chichi
- Hindi Ka na Mag-iisa (2012) as Mimi
- Kahit Puso'y Masugatan (2012) as Bryan
- Wansapanataym
  - Petrang Paminta (2013) as Lana
- Jim Fernandez's Galema, Anak ni Zuma (2013–2014) as Teacher Karlo
- Sabado Badoo (2015) as himself cameo footage featured
- FlordeLiza (2015) as Rona
- Sunday PinaSaya (2015–2019) as himself/mainstay
- Vampire ang Daddy Ko (2015)
- Princess in the Palace (2015) as Georgina Veloso
- Mulawin vs. Ravena (2017) as Dakdak

=== Theater ===
- Zsazsa Zaturnah Ze Muzikal
- Ang Ulo ni Pancho Villa
- ILUSTRADO: Ang Buhay ni Rizal
- Noli Me Tangere
- El Filibusterismo
- Ulilang Tahanan
- Prinsipe ng Buwan
- Ang Bayot, Ang Meranao at ang Habal-Habal sa isang Nakakabagot na Paghihintay sa Kanto ng Lanao del Norte
- Electle Dysfunction
- Ang Saranggola ni Pepe
- The Little Prince
- Virgin Labfest
  - Bawal Tumawid, Nakamamatay

== Awards and nominations ==
| Year | Award | Category | Work | Result | Ref. |
|---|---|---|---|---|---|
| 2008 | 21st Aliw Awards | Best Stage Actor (Non-Musical) | Ang Bayot, Ang Meranao at ang Habal-Habal sa isang Nakakabagot na Paghihintay sa Kanto ng Lanao del Norte (play) | Won | |
| 2009 | 2008 Philstage Gawad Buhay! Awards for the Performing Arts | Outstanding Male Lead Performance in a Play | Ang Bayot, Ang Meranao at ang Habal-Habal sa isang Nakakabagot na Paghihintay sa Kanto ng Lanao del Norte (play) | Nominated | |
| 2010 | 33rd Gawad Urian Awards | Pinakamahusay na Aktor (Best Actor) | Last Supper No. 3 (film) | Nominated | |
| 2010 | 7th Golden Screen Awards | Best Performance by an Actor in a Leading Role (Musical or Comedy) | Last Supper No. 3 (film) | Nominated | |
| 2010 | 26th PMPC Star Awards for Movies | New Movie Actor of the Year | Last Supper No. 3 (film) | Nominated | |
| 2013 | 10th Golden Screen Awards | Best Performance by an Actor in a Supporting Role (Drama, Musical or Comedy) | Bwakaw (film) | Nominated | |
| 2013 | 9th Cinemalaya Independent Film Festival | Best Supporting Actor (New Breed Category); Balanghai Trophy | Babagwa (film) | Won | |
| 2013 | 24th Young Critics Circle Award | Best Performance | Babagwa (film) | Nominated | |
| 2014 | 12th Gawad Tanglaw Awards | Best Supporting Actor | Babagwa (film) | Won | |
| 2014 | 30th PMPC Star Awards for Movies | Movie Supporting Actor of the Year | Babagwa (film) | Nominated | |
| 2014 | 11th Golden Screen Awards | Best Performance by an Actor in a Supporting Role (Drama, Musical or Comedy) | Dance of the Steelbars (film) | Won | |
| 2020 | 2020 FilMay International Short Film Festival (Kumanovo, North Macedonia) | Best Director | Igib (film) | Won | |
| 2023 | 37th PMPC Star Awards for Movies | Short Movie Director of the Year | Igib (film) | Nominated | |
