= Regal Shocker =

Philippine horror anthology television show

- Revival series title card
- Genre: Horror; Anthology
- Created by: TV5 Network, Inc. Regal Entertainment
- Directed by: Emil Cruz Jr. (14 episodes); Argel Joseph (10 episodes); Salvador Royales (1 episode); Artemio Marquez (9 episodes); Topel Lee (5 episodes); Rahyan Carlos (6 episodes); Lore Reyes (3 episodes); Toto Natividad (2 episodes); Rico Maria Ilarde (2 episodes); Lawrence Fajardo (1 episode); Soxie H. Topacio (1 episode); Rich Alfonso (1 episode)
- Country of origin: Philippines
- Original language: Tagalog

Production
- Executive producers: Manny Valera; Lily Monteverde; Joy Elisse Aquino
- Producers: Lily Monteverde; Ruby Rose Cuevas; Janathan Magsaysay; Jennifer Valencia; Christy Laquindanum; Rowena Concepcion
- Running time: 60 minutes
- Production companies: Regal Entertainment; Regal Multimedia Inc.

Original release
- Network: GMA Network
- Release: 1985 – 1989
- Network: IBC
- Release: 1989 – 1990
- Network: TV5
- Release: November 5, 2011 – April 28, 2012

Regal Shocker is a Philippine television drama horror series broadcast by GMA Network, IBC and TV5. Directed by Emil Cruz Jr., Argel Joseph, Salvador Royales, Artemio Marquez, Topel Lee, Rahyan Carlos, Lore Reyes, Toto Natividad, Rico Maria Ilarde, Lawrence Fajardo, Soxie H. Topacio and Rich Alfonso, it aired from 1985 to 1990. The show returned from November 5, 2011, to April 28, 2012. The show feature Filipino stories involving the supernatural and the macabre. The show's recurring character is the Grim Reaper, who appears to narrate the stories.

== Episodes ==
=== Original series (1989–1990) ===
No.	Title	Directed by	Written by	Cast of characters
1	Saan Ka Pupunta?	Emil Cruz Jr.	Joey Alcaraz	Rachel Anne Wolfe, Greggy Liwag, Luz Fernandez, Tony Angeles, Bituin Rada
2	Karunungang Itim	Argel Joseph	Joey Alcaraz	Nadia Montenegro, Vivian Foz, Cesar Montano, Joker
3	Nang Umibig ang Impakto	Emil Cruz Jr.	Tata Mel	Mia Pratts, Cesar Montano, Lucita Soriano, Joseph de Cordova, Feling Cudia, Kim, Lito Gomez
4	Dilat na Bangkay	Argel Joseph	Noel Espinosa	Jackie Lou Blanco, Tommy Abuel, Joel Torre, Isabel Granada, Dindo Arroyo, Joseph de Cordova, James de la Rosa
5	Pugot na Maestro	Salvador Royales	Emil Cruz Jr.	Richard Arellano, Tirso Cruz III, Rachel Anne Wolfe, Cesar Montano, Chuck Perez, Ester Chavez
6	Diyosa ng Lagim	Argel Joseph	Emil Cruz Jr.	Maria Isabel Lopez, Cesar Montano, Ana Cabrera, Lucy Quinto, Cesar Dimaculangan, Marlon Valledo
7	Halimaw ng Dilim	Argel Joseph	Joey Alcaraz	Cherie Gil, Juan Rodrigo, Efren Reyes Jr., Fred Montilla, Wendy Villarica
8	Balong Malalim	Emil Cruz Jr.	Noel Espinosa	Melissa Mendez, Vivian Foz, Raffy Romillo, Augusto Victa, Symon Soler, Bituin Rada
9	Matatalim na Pangil	Emil Cruz Jr.	Joey Alcaraz	Efren Reyes Jr., Ernie Garcia, Rachel Anne Wolfe, Eva Ramos, Dante Castro
10	Isang Paa sa Hukay	Artemio Marquez	Rey C. de Castro	Maria Isabel Lopez, Juan Rodrigo, Ruben Rustia, Augusto Victa, Tony Angeles, Edwin Reyes
11	Nang Gumanti ang Mga Bangkay	Argel Joseph	Joey Alcaraz	Niño Muhlach, Orestes Ojeda, Augusto Victa, Eddie del Mar Jr.
12	Kasal sa Hukay	Argel Joseph	Emil Cruz Jr.	Snooky Serna, Mat Ranillo III, Lito Pimentel, Perla Bautista, Jeffrey Santos, Alex Bolado, Tony Angeles, James de la Rosa
13	Demonyo	Emil Cruz Jr.	Deo Fajardo Jr.	Irma Alegre, Juan Rodrigo, Rez Cortez, Angelo Ventura, Maribel Cruz, Bituin Rada, Clemente Valledo, Jerry Asilo, Gene Mendoza, Vincent Cebu
14	Pangil sa Pangil	Emil Cruz Jr.	Orly Aquino	Francis Magalona, Eula Valdez, Luz Fernandez, Willie Natividad
15	Isasama Kita sa Libingan	Artemio Marquez	Rey C. de Castro	Janice de Belen, Luis Gonzales, Chuck Perez, Mia Gutierrez, Ces Aldaba, Binky Victorino
16	Nagbabagang Mata	Artemio Marquez	Buddy Palad	Mia Pratts, Perla Bautista, Lito Legaspi, Augusto Victa, Eva Ramos, Myrna Rosales, Jess Vargas, Grace Figues, Marco Valera, Joel Lozano
17	Anak ng Lagim	Artemio Marquez	Joey Alcaraz	Jeanette Torres, Juan Rodrigo, Melissa De Leon, Jess Vargas
18	Kilabot	Artemio Marquez	Rey C. de Castro	Gina Pareño, Cesar Montano, Odette Khan, Carlo Gonzales, Jimmy De Leon, Binky Victorino
19	Lumulutang na Kabaong	Emil Cruz Jr.	Noel Espinosa	Carmi Martin, Robin Padilla, Carol Dauden, Eva Ramos, Lucy Quinto, Eruel Tongco, Tyrone Victa, James Flores
20	Ang Misteryo ng Anting-anting sa Dilim	Emil Cruz Jr.	Joey Alcaraz	Jean Saburit, Jess Lapid Jr., Lucita Soriano, Raul Salvador, Mon Godiz, Sabatini Fernandez
21	Spirit of the Dead	Artemio Marquez	Buddy Palad	Carmina Villarroel, Jeffrey Santos, Raoul Aragon, Dexter Doria, Tita de Villa, Jess de la Paz, Dante Castro
22	Morgue	Argel Joseph	Emil Cruz Jr.	Maricel Soriano, William Martinez, Tony Santos Sr., Ester Chavez, Augusto Victa, Judy Ann Santos, Mely Tuazon, Kiko Mallari, Lito Gomez, Manjo del Mundo
23	Anino sa Salamin	Argel Joseph	Lily Cruz	Miguel Rodriguez, Angela Perez, Luz Fernandez, Johnny Vicar, Jeremy Tristan, Julius Putian, John Aldo, Ernie Padua
24	Impiyerno sa Lupa	Artemio Marquez	Rey C. de Castro	Tetchie Agbayani, Robert Ortega, Odette Khan, Orestes Ojeda, Ruben Rustia, Lucita Soriano, Romy Diaz, Clifford Arriza, Grazielle Geronimo, Jenny Ann Mendoza
25	Wala Ka Nang Matatakbuhan	Emil Cruz Jr.	Joey Alcaraz	Jon Hernandez, Amy Perez, Anita Linda, Paolo Delgado, Cris Villanueva, Joed Serrano, Jess Vargas, Byron Lozano
26	Kuko ng Pusa	Emil Cruz Jr.	Deo Fajardo Jr.	Francis Magalona, Robin Padilla, Glenda Garcia, Eruel Tongco, Joseph de Cordova, Jun Hidalgo, Feling Cudia
27	Laman-lupa	Argel Joseph	N/A	Maria Isabel Lopez, Dranreb Belleza, Ruben Rustia, Jun Payawal, Tita de Villa
28	Dugo ng Daga	Argel Joseph	Deo Fajardo Jr.	John Regala, Jennylyn Mercado, Francis Magalona
29	Bahay sa Gulod	N/A	N/A	Chuck Perez, Rowell Santiago, Eula Valdez
30	Kamay ni Bay	Artemio Marquez	Buddy Palad	Dranreb Belleza, Augusto Victa, Leni Santos, Jaime Castillo, Bubbles Atienza, Carlo Gonzales, Edgar Lara, Boy Salvador
31	Taong Paniki	N/A	N/A	Janice de Belen, Julio Diaz, Perla Bautista
32	Ililibing Ka ng Buhay	Emil Cruz Jr.	Deo Fajardo Jr.	Jean Garcia, Chuck Perez, Tita de Villa, Bituin Rada
33	Ibong Itim	Artemio Marquez	Buddy Palad	Cesar Montano, Alicia Vergel, Aurora Sevilla, Glenda Garcia, Tess Dumpit, Pen Medina, Ilonah Jean, Ces Aldaba
34	Gabi ng Mga Ulupong	N/A	N/A	Rey "PJ" Abelllana, Leni Santos, Efren Reyes Jr., Ronnie Lazaro, Dang Cecilio, Lito Pastrana, Botik Fernandez, Joonee Gamboa
35	Pangil	Emil Cruz Jr.	Deo Fajardo Jr.	Lito Pimentel, Edgar Mande, Louella De Cordova, Mary Walter, Spike
36	Lagim sa Lagim	N/A	N/A	Robin Padilla, Vivian Foz, Rey Ventura
37	Susunod Kang Mamamatay!	Emil Cruz Jr.	Jhune Cristobal	Janet Bordon, Perla Bautista, Joseph de Cordova, RR Herrera, Ver Sumayang, Lito Gomez
38	Paru-Parong Itim	Emil Cruz Jr.	Deo Fajardo Jr.	Chuck Perez, Greggy Liwag, Melissa Mendez, Ester Chavez, Philip Henson, Rina Lacson

=== Revival series (2011–2012) ===
No.	Title	Directed by	Written by	Cast of characters	Original release date
1	Elevator	Topel Lee	Roy Monido	Gabby Concepcion, Niña Jose-Quiambao, Christine Joy De Guzman, Jess Evardone, Che Ramos	November 5, 2011
2	Red Shoes	Soxie Topacio	J.M. Costales	Ruffa Gutierrez, Wendell Ramos, Precious Lara Quigaman, Moi Marcampo	November 12, 2011
3	Piano	Rahyan Carlos	Christian Vallez	Alex Gonzaga, Edgar Allan Guzman, Bobby Andrews, Angel Jacob	November 19, 2011
4	Espiritista	Rahyan Carlos	Rahyan Carlos, J.M. Costales	John Lapus, James Blanco, Bekimon, Lui Manansala, Richie Albarida	November 26, 2011
5	Salamin	Topel Lee	Rahyan Carlos, Cholo Espino	Nadine Samonte, Bella Flores, Karel Marquez, Victor Basa, Anna Vicente, Guji Lorenzana, Erika Padilla	December 3, 2011
6	Kulam	Toto Natividad	Rahyan Carlos, Julia Monido	Martin Escudero, Valerie Concepcion, Nikki Valdez, BJ Forbes, Eula Caballero, Junyka Santarin, Julius Gareza, Malou Crisologo	December 17, 2011
7	Family Reunion	Lore Reyes	Rahyan Carlos, J.M. Costales	Bernard Palanca, Ritz Azul, Alwyn Uytingco, Valeen Montenegro, Victor Silayan, Fred Payawan, Trina Legaspi, Laiza Comia, Kristine Serrano, Eduardo Jose Jr.	December 24, 2011
8	Regalo	Rahyan Carlos	Rahyan Carlos, Fairlane Raymundo	Jestoni Alarcon, Maritoni Fernandez, Angeli Nicole Sanoy, Thou Reyes	December 31, 2011
9	Perya	Lore Reyes	Rahyan Carlos, Fairlane Raymundo	Jasmine Curtis-Smith, Ketchup Eusebio, Lester Llansang, Cai Cortez, Kerbie Zamora, Chris Pasturan, Perla Bautista, IC Mendoza	January 7, 2012
10	Perya: Part 2	Lore Reyes	Rahyan Carlos, Fairlane Raymundo	Jasmine Curtis-Smith, Ketchup Eusebio, Lester Llansang, Cai Cortez, Kerbie Zamora, Chris Pasturan, Rommel Padilla, Perla Bautista, IC Mendoza	January 14, 2012
11	Aparador	Toto Natividad	Rahyan Carlos, Cholo Espino	Carmi Martin, Jeffrey Quizon, BJ Go, Raul Dillo	January 21, 2012
12	Kambal	Rico Maria Ilarde	Rahyan Carlos, J.M. Costales	Megan Young, Victor Basa, Brenna Garcia, Emilio Garcia, Rio Locsin	January 28, 28
13	Teatro	Rico Maria Ilarde	Rahyan Carlos, J.M. Costales	Eula Caballero, Helga Krapf, Aldred Gatchalian, Kiray Celis, Andrea Del Rosario, Malou Crisologo, Rolando Inocencio	February 4, 2012
14	Anito	Lawrence Fajardo	Rahyan Carlos, J.M. Costales, Cholo Espino	Denise Laurel, Hiro Peralta, Ritz Azul, Chris Pasturan, Johnny Barnes, Raul Montesa	February 11, 2012
15	Gayuma	Topel Lee	Rahyan Carlos, J.M. Costales	Valerie Concepcion, James Blanco, Lemuel Pelayo, Bekimon, Tess Antonio, Joe Gruta	February 18, 2012
16	Pelikula: Part 1	Topel Lee	Rahyan Carlos, Fairlane Raymundo	Cai Cortez, Alex Castro, Alodia Gosiengfiao, Thou Reyes, Valeen Montenegro, Atak, Gene Padilla, Romano Vasquez	February 25, 2012
17	Pelikula: Part 2	Topel Lee	Rahyan Carlos, Fairlane Raymundo	Alex Castro, Cai Cortez, Thou Reyes, Neil Ryan Sese, Rez Cortez, Charles Christianson, Gene Padilla, Beybisaya	March 3, 2012
18	Pangitain	Rahyan Carlos	Rahyan Carlos, J.M. Costales	Nash Aguas, Agot Isidro, Beverly Salviejo, Roden Araneta	March 10, 2012
19	Fx	Rahyan Carlos	Rahyan Carlos, J.M. Costales	Felix Roco, Iwa Moto, Rodjun Cruz, Ivan Dorschner, Joyce So, Bekimon, Manu Respall, Arpee Bautista, Gino Gardiola, John Lu	March 24, 2012
20	Manananggal	Rahyan Carlos	Rahyan Carlos, Jimuel Dela Cruz	Alex Gonzaga, Arron Villaflor, Dianne Medina, Emilio Garcia, Frances Makil-Ignacio	March 31, 2012
21	Punso	Rich Alfonso	Rahyan Carlos, J.M. Costales	Joross Gamboa, Lauren Young, Joy Viado, Thou Reyes, Chris Pasturan, Angel Raymundo, Alora Mae Sasam	April 28, 2012

== Film adaptation ==
A film adaptation of the series was created. Titled Regal Shocker: The Movie, it was produced by Regal Films and directed by Jose Javier Reyes. The film was released in 1989. The film includes three stories: "Pangako", "Karambola", and "Aparador".

== See also ==
- List of TV5 (Philippine TV network) original programming
