= Topel Lee =

Filipino film and television director

Topel Lee is a Filipino film and television director and cinematographer, best known for his work in the horror and suspense genres. He has also worked as a music video director.

== Early life and education ==
Topel Lee comes from a family of artists. His father, Mon Lee, and uncle, Rox Lee, are animators. He is also related to filmmaker Ruben Lee, as well as to punk rock painter Romeo Lee. Lee studied at the University of the Philippines Diliman and trained in cinematography at the Mowelfund Film Institute under Yam Laranas. After completing his studies, he began working on film projects.

== Directorial style ==
Lee is primarily known for his work in the horror genre, often focusing on suspenseful storytelling and technical execution. In describing the challenge of keeping his films fresh, he noted that he researches extensively, watches foreign directors, and consults producers to refine scenes. Lee described his approach to horror and suspense as centered on story, unpredictability, and technical execution. According to Lee, sound, lighting, set design, and other technical aspects are crucial in building tension, and he often incorporates new "surprise devices" to introduce unpredictability.

Lee's filmmaking style emphasizes meticulous planning and attention to detail. He frequently uses storyboards to previsualize scenes, which helps ensure efficient set setups and reduces production costs.

Although Lee is primarily known for horror films, he has expressed interest in working across different genres. He has cited directors such as Zhang Yimou, Danny Boyle, David Fincher, Erik Matti, and Brillante Mendoza as influences, expressing a desire to work across different genres like them.

== Filmography ==
=== Director ===
==== Film ====
Year	Title	Notes	Ref.
2006	Imahe Nasyon	Segment: "Ang Manunulat"; also credited as writer	
2006	Shake, Rattle and Roll 8	Segment: "Yaya"	
2007	Ouija		
2007	My Kuya's Wedding		
2007	Shake, Rattle and Roll 9	Segment: "Engkanto"	
2008	Shake, Rattle & Roll X	Segment: "Class Picture"	
2009	Sundo		
2009	Wapakman		
2010	White House		
2010	Shake, Rattle and Roll 12	Segment: "Isla"	
2011	Tumbok		
2012	Amorosa		
2014	Basement	Also credited with story and concept	
2017	Bloody Crayons		
2018	The Hopeful Romantic		
2020	Mang Kepweng: Ang Lihim ng Bandanang Itim		
2025	Jeongbu		

==== Television ====
Year	Title	Notes	Ref.
2007	La Vendetta		
2007–2008	Kamandag		
2007	My Only Love	Second director	
2008–2009	Gagambino		
2008	Obra	Episode 4: "Sapi"	
2009	Ang Babaeng Hinugot sa Aking Tadyang		
2009	Dear Friend		
2009	Kung Aagawin Mo ang Lahat sa Akin		
2009–2010	Kaya Kong Abutin ang Langit		
2010	Ilumina		
2011	Mistaken Identity		
2011	Carlo J. Caparas' Bangis		
2011	Ang Utol Kong Hoodlum		
2011–2012	Regal Shocker	Episode 1 & 5	
2012	Third Eye		
2013	Undercover		
2013	Dormitoryo		
2013	Kidlat		
2014	Confessions of a Torpe		
2014	Elemento		
2015–2016	Parang Normal Activity	Season 1, Episode 10-13; Season 2, Episode 8-13	
2017–2018	Hanggang Saan		
2018	Spirits Reawaken		
2019	Bukas May Kahapon		
2022	The Chosen One: Soap Opera	Also served as guest mentor for one episode	
2022	Larawan, Liko, Lipat	Season 1, Episode 1: "Larawan"	

=== Cinematographer ===
Year	Title	Director(s)	Notes	Ref.
2013	Babagwa	Jason Paul Laxamana		
2016	Straight to the Heart	David Fabros		
2016	Ang Taba Ko Kasi	Jason Paul Laxamana		
2016	Magtanggol	Sigfreid Barros-Sanchez		
2016	Mercury is Mine	Jason Paul Laxamana		
2016	Kabisera	Arturo San Agustin and Real Florido		
2017	Across the Crescent Moon	Baby Nebrida		

== Awards and nominations ==
Organization	Year	Nominated Work	Category	Result	Ref.
PMPC Star Awards for Movies	2008	Ouija	Movie Director of the Year	Nominated	
PMPC Star Awards for Movies	2013	Amorosa (The Revenge)	Indie Movie Director of the Year	Nominated	
PMPC Star Awards for Movies	2017	Kabisera	Indie Movie Cinematographer of the Year	Nominated	
Sinag Maynila Film Festival	2025	Jeongbu	Best Director	Won	
