= Ang Utol Kong Hoodlum =

- Genre: Drama
- Created by: Deo J. Fajardo
- Based on: Ang Utol Kong Hoodlum (1991) by Deo J. Fajardo Jr.
- Developed by: Deo J. Fajardo
- Directed by: Argel Joseph; Topel Lee; Soxie H. Topacio
- Starring: JC de Vera; Jasmine Curtis-Smith
- Opening theme: "Pangako" by Cueshé
- Ending theme: "Pangako" by Mark Alain and Morissette
- Country of origin: Philippines
- Original language: Filipino
- No. of episodes: 50

Production
- Executive producers: Soc Jose; Lian Garcia
- Running time: 30 minutes
- Production company: Viva Television

Original release
- Network: TV5
- Release: September 12 – November 18, 2011

Ang Utol Kong Hoodlum (lit. 'My Brother is a Hoodlum') is a Philippine television drama romance series broadcast by TV5. The series is based on a 1991 Philippine film at the same title. Directed by Argel Joseph, Topel Lee and Soxie H. Topacio, it stars JC de Vera and Jasmine Curtis-Smith. It aired from September 12 to November 18, 2011, replacing Rod Santiago's The Sisters and was replaced by P. S. I Love You. The series is produced by Vic Del Rosario Jr., and Manuel V. Pangilinan and it also marks as the first primetime series produced by Viva Television for TV5 after a decade.

== Cast ==
=== Main cast ===
- JC de Vera as Benjamin "Ben" Maningding
- Jasmine Curtis-Smith as Bernadette Grace "Bing" Morrison
- Regine Tolentino as Emily Bustillos-Morrison
- Ara Mina as Rhea Bustillos
- Rainier Castillo as Jaynard
- Arci Muñoz as Vanessa
- Jay Manalo as Salazar
- IC Mendoza as Bruce

=== Recurring cast ===
- Carlo Aquino as Ethan
- Noel Trinidad as Theodorico
- Empoy Marquez as Epal
- Mariz Ricketts as Salve
- Beau Ballinger as Liam
- Bella Flores as Granny Britney
- Flora Gasser as Momsy Mariah
- Dennis Padilla as Tiyo Paeng
- Jef Gaitan as Bambi
- Ramon Christopher as Ace
- Benjie Paras as Franco
- RK Bagatsing as Greco Natividad

== Trivia ==
- Dennis Padilla, Flora Gasser and IC Mendoza were also part of the original movie as well as its sequel.

== See also ==
- List of TV5 (Philippine TV network) original programming
