= Pasahero =

- Theatrical release poster
- Directed by: Roman Perez Jr.
- Written by: Juvy Galamiton
- Produced by: Grace Cristobal; Louie Cristobal; Vincent Del Rosario III; Vic del Rosario; Valerie S. Del Rosario; Veronique Del Rosario-Corpus
- Starring: Bea Binene; Louise delos Reyes; Mark Anthony Fernandez; Katya Santos; Yumi Garcia; Andre Yllana; Dani Zee
- Cinematography: Neil Bion
- Edited by: Aaron Alegre
- Music by: Decky Margaja
- Production companies: Blvck Films; Pelikula Indiopendent; Viva Films
- Distributed by: Viva Films; JPHLiX Films
- Release date: October 9, 2024
- Running time: 120 minutes
- Country: Philippines
- Language: Filipino

Pasahero (lit. 'Passenger') is a 2024 Philippine crime supernatural horror film written by Juvy Galamiton and directed by Roman Perez Jr. It stars Bea Binene, Louise delos Reyes, Mark Anthony Fernandez, Katya Santos, Yumi Garcia, Andre Yllana and Dani Zee.

== Synopsis ==
A woman named Michelle was harassed in the train and after several days she died, later on the rapist and the passengers who saw the incident face personal misfortunes connected to the incident.

== Cast ==
- Bea Binene as Angel
- Louise delos Reyes as Michelle
- Mark Anthony Fernandez as Tom
- Katya Santos as Tina
- Yumi Garcia as Drea
- Andre Yllana as Martin
- Dani Zee as Belle
- Keann Johnson as Alvin
- Rafa Siguion-Reyna as Trevor
- CJ Barinaga
- Teptep Mendoza

== Release ==
The film released in theaters in the Philippines on October 9, 2024, under Viva Films and JPHLiX Films. It was also screened in SM Cinemas as part of Sine Sindak horror film festival which ran from October 30 to November 5, 2024.

== Reception ==
Fred Hawson of ABS-CBN gave the film a rating of 6 over 10 and he said; Perez was very imaginative in how he composed his shots during the climactic third act, but those familiar with the Caloocan City Hall complex will recognize where those scenes were shot. To evoke real-life horror of its premise, Perez mixed in CCTV footage of ongoing crimes where no one helped.

Roy Remorca of Cine Geeks Podcast gave the film a B rating, praising its decision to avoid relying on frequent jump scares and describing it as a horror film that also engages with its themes rather than functioning solely as a "mindless scare fest".
