= Louise delos Reyes =

Filipino actress (born 1992)

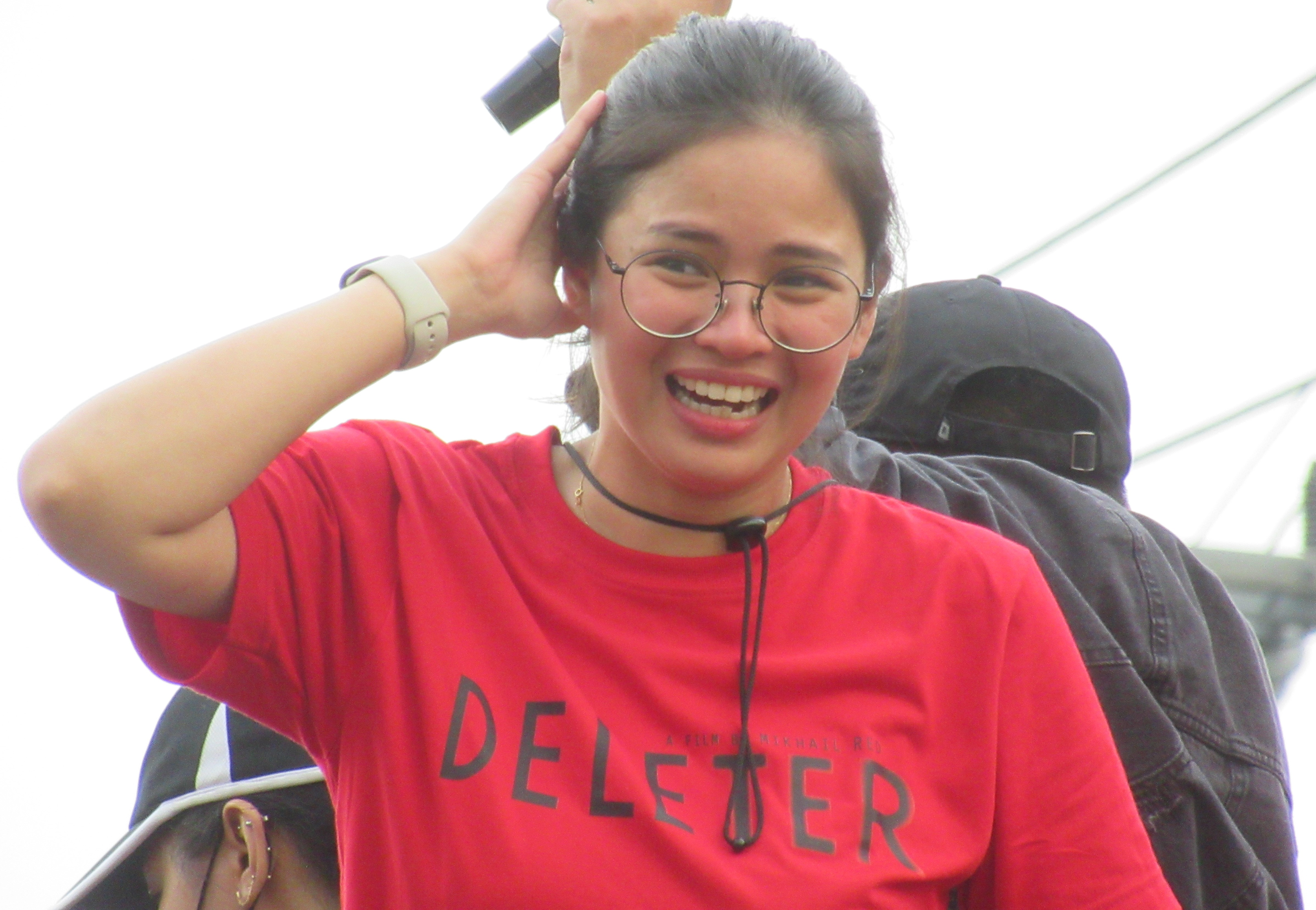
- Delos Reyes in 2022
- Born: Mary Grace delos Reyes Perido; September 1, 1992 (age 34); Tanza, Cavite, Philippines
- Education: Lyceum of the Philippines University-Cavite
- Occupation: Actress
- Years active: 1999–present
- Agents: Star Magic (1999–2003, 2017-2019); Sparkle (2003–2004, 2010–2017); Viva Artists Agency (2017–present)
- Known for: Adana in Alakdana, Elize in One True Love, Marilyn in Mundo Mo'y Akin, Alona/Perlas in Kambal Sirena

Mary Grace delos Reyes Perido (born September 1, 1992), known as Louise delos Reyes, is a Filipino actress. She starred on various television series such as Alakdana (2011), One True Love (2012), Mundo Mo'y Akin (2013), and Kambal Sirena (2014).

== Early life and background ==
Delos Reyes was 8 years old when she started her acting career in the show Ang TV 2 using her real name Grace. She was then a cast in Ang Iibigin ay Ikaw and had been a contract artist of GMA until early 2004 and stopped to focus on her studies. She returned to TV as part of the cast of Lipgloss in TV5. She also played a lead role in the Peque Gallaga indie film Agaton and Mindy, which earned her a Best New Movie Actress nomination from PMPC. Before her TV career, she has won beauty contests including Ms. Lyceum of the Philippines University — Cavite 2010, Ms. Teen Philippines International — Luzon 2007, Ms. Jag Teen 2007 and Ms. Teen Super Ferry 2007.

== Career ==
In 2010, Delos Reyes had her first acting stint on GMA as Maricel Soriano's daughter in Pilyang Kerubin. She was then cast in Reel Love Presents: Tween Hearts and got her very first lead role in Alakdana. She had played in several movies and co-starred with Kathryn Bernardo in a 2011 horror movie Parola: Shake, Rattle & Roll 13. Delos Reyes was also a cast in My Beloved headlined by Marian Rivera and Dingdong Dantes and got her first break in 2012 as she played the lead role Elize in the GMA primetime drama One True Love with Alden Richards.

The success of Richards and Delos Reyes tandem was followed by another top-rating show Mundo Mo'y Akin in 2013. She also got her degree in Foreign Service, came back in doing indie film via Island Dreams on the same year. In 2014, she headlined Kambal Sirena portraying a dual role as human/mermaid. Delos Reyes made a TV comeback as Pepay in GMA's Afternoon Prime drama Magkaibang Mundo in 2016 and starred in Baka Bukas. By early 2017, she left GMA Artist Center and signed a 5-year managerial contract with VIVA Artists Agency.

She returned to her former network, ABS-CBN, and is also seen in the Sari-Sari Channel.

Aside from being an actress, Delos Reyes also works as a pastry chef. On December 22, 2024, she announced her engagement to her longtime non-showbiz boyfriend.

== Filmography ==
=== Film ===
Year	Title	Role
2002	9 Mornings	Sampaguita Girl (credited as Mary Grace Perido)
2009	Agaton and Mindy	Mindy
2011	Tween Academy: Class of 2012	Jess
2011	The Road	Joy
2011	Shake, Rattle & Roll 13	Shane
2013	Island Dreams	Julie
2014	Basement	Roxy
2016	Ang Hapis at Himagsik ni Hermano Puli	Hermana Lina
2016	Baka Bukas	Jess
2017	Mang Kepweng Returns	Sofia
2018	Para sa Broken Hearted	Kath
2019	Hanggang Kailan?	Kath
2019	Sanggano, Sanggago't Sanggwapo	Sam
2019	My Bakit List	Dess
2021	The Housmaid	Roxanne
2022	The Wife	Mara
2022	Deleter	Aileen
2023	Marita	Sandra
2024	Itutumba Ka ng Tatay Ko	Marlyn
2024	Pasahero	Michelle
2026	Love, Ngo	Scarlet

=== Television ===
Year	Title	Role
1999-2002	!Oka Tokat	
2000–2003	Ang TV 2	Herself / Various Roles
2001–2003, 2017–2019, 2026–present	ASAP XP	Herself / Performer
2003	Ang Iibigin ay Ikaw	Young Stella
2008–2009	Lipgloss	Louise Tanco
2010	BFGF	Hermes
2010–2013	Party Pilipinas	Herself / Performer
2010	Pilyang Kerubin	Isabel
2010–2011	Reel Love Presents Tween Hearts	Luisa dela Cruz
2011	Alakdana	Adana San Miguel
2012	My Beloved	Grace Velasco
2012	One True Love	Elize Samonte
2013	Mundo Mo'y Akin	Marilyn Carbonel
2013	Magpakailanman: The Louise delos Reyes Story	Herself
2013–2015	Sunday All Stars	Herself / Performer
2014	Kambal Sirena	Alona Natividad-Ramos
2014	Kambal Sirena	Pearl "Perlas" Natividad-Villanueva
2015	My Faithful Husband	Mylene Fernandez-Sanreal
2015	Alamat: Juan Tamad	Mariang Masipag (Voice)
2015	Dangwa	Toni
2016	Wagas: Summit Lovin'	Gracey
2016	Magpakailanman: Dalawang Ina, Isang Anak	Kath
2016	Maynila: Lucky I'm in Love	Eunice
2016	Magkaibang Mundo	Princess Sandoval-Cruz
2016	Wagas: Champion ng Buhay Ko	Janice
2016	Maynila: Once Upon a Fairytale	Gelay
2016	Wagas: Past Life	Jade
2017	Wattpad Presents: I'm Making Out With the Playboy at School	Amber Tuazon
2017	FPJ's Ang Probinsyano	PO3 Katrina Velasco
2017	Hour Glass	Tuesday
2017	Wansapanataym: Louie's Biton	Melissa
2017	Maalaala Mo Kaya: Siopao	Annie
2018	Ipaglaban Mo: Haciendero	Ruth
2018	Asintado	Yvonne Calata
2018	Ipaglaban Mo: Gapang	Tanya
2019	Ipaglaban Mo: Reputasyon	Dinah
2019	Destiny Guard	Xaxa
2019	Ipaglaban Mo: Legal Na Ina	Amanda
2021	Wanted: Ang Serye	Marie
2021	Kagat ng Dilim	Sabel Resurreccion
2021	Encounter	Crystal
2023	Deadly Love	Tessa
2023	For the Love	Guest
2024	Chasing in the Wild	Coach Tina
2025	Incognito	Clara
2025	FPJ's Batang Quiapo	Doña Pilar Guerrero (young version)
2025	I Love You Since 1892	Maria Montecarlos

=== Music videos ===
Year	Title	Artist
2013	"Haplos"	Alden Richards
2017	"Walang Hanggan"	Jose Villanueva III a.k.a. Quest
2018	"Magkalayo"	Mayonnaise

== Awards and nominations ==
Year	Award	Category	Nominated work	Result
2008	26th PMPC Star Awards for Movies	New Movie Actress of the Year	Agaton and Mindy	Nominated
2011	OMG!Yahoo Awards	Amazing Female Newcomer		Nominated
2011	FAMAS Awards	German Moreno Youth Achievement Award		Won
2013	OMG!Yahoo Awards	Love Team of The Year (w/ Alden Richards)		Nominated
2014	FHM Philippines	100 Sexiest Woman		Ranked No. 78
