= Transit (2013 film) =

- Transit (2013)
- Directed by: Hannah Espia
- Screenplay by: Giancarlo Abrahan; Hannah Espia
- Produced by: Paul Soriano
- Starring: Irma Adlawan; Marc Alvarez; Mercedes Cabral; Jasmine Curtis; Ping Medina
- Cinematography: Ber Cruz; Lyle Sacris
- Edited by: Hannah Espia; Benjamin Gonzales Tolentino
- Music by: Mon Espia
- Production companies: Cinemalaya; Ten17P
- Release dates: July 27, 2013 (Cinemalaya); September 11, 2013 (Philippines)
- Running time: 93 minutes
- Country: Philippines
- Languages: Filipino; Tagalog; English; Hebrew

Transit is a 2013 Filipino independent drama film written and directed by Hannah Espia. The film follows a story about a single father who is forced to hide his children from immigration police in Israel after the Israeli government decides to deport children of immigrant workers. It is Espia's full-length debut film. It was mostly shot in Israel. The film competed under the New Breed section of Cinemalaya 2013. The film won Best Film, directing, acting and other technical awards.

Espia said that the inspiration to do the film came after talking to an OFW who was bringing home his child from Israel. In 2009, the Israeli government enacted a law that deports the children of migrant workers unless they fulfill a certain criterion. Both Israeli and migrant workers rallied against the law that separates parents from their children.

The film competed in the 18th Busan International Film Festival in the "New Currents" section. The film was selected as the Philippine entry for the Best Foreign Language Film at the 86th Academy Awards, but it was not nominated.

== Reception ==
A review from 2013 Variety is extensive, calling Transit, "constantly engaging and frequently moving".

== Cast ==
- Ping Medina as Moises
- Irma Adlawan as Janet
- Jasmine Curtis-Smith as Yael
- Marc Justine Alvarez as Joshua
- Mercedes Cabral as Tina
- Perla (Pnina) Bronstein as Rotem
- Omer Juran as Omri
- Toni Gonzaga as Joshua's Mother
- Menahem Godick as Israeli policeman

== Awards ==
- 2013 Cinemalaya Film Festival (New Breed)
  - Best Film
  - Audience Award
  - Best Director – Hannah Espia
  - Best Actress – Irma Adlawan
  - Best Supporting Actress – Jasmine Curtis-Smith
  - Special Jury Citation for Best Acting Ensemble – (Irma Adlawan, Marc Alvarez, Mercedes Cabral, Jasmine Curtis, Ping Medina)
  - Best Cinematography – Ber Cruz and Lyle Nemenzo Sacris
  - Best Editing – Benjamin Tolentino and Hannah Espia
  - Best Score – Mon Espia
- 2014 Gawad Urian Awards
  - Best Director – Hannah Espia
