= Jasmine Curtis-Smith =

Filipino actress

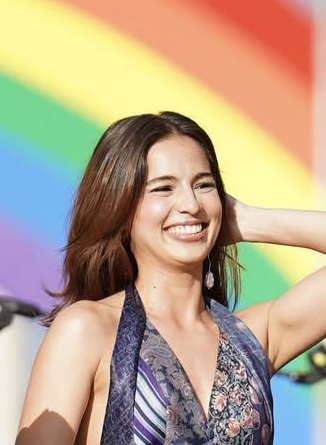
- Curtis-Smith in 2026
- Born: Jasmine Casandra Curtis-Smith (Note: Jasmine Curtis-Smith was born in Australia. Thus, she does not possess her mother's maiden name which is Ojales.); 6 April 1994 (age 32); Melbourne, Victoria, Australia
- Citizenship: Australia; Philippines
- Occupation: Actress
- Years active: 2010–present
- Agents: TV5 Network (2010–2016); Vidanes Celebrity Marketing (2010–2021, 2025–present); GMA Network (2018–present); Crown Artist Management (2021–2025)
- Relatives: Anne Curtis (sister)

Jasmine Casandra Curtis-Smith (Tagalog pronunciation: [ˈkəɹtɪs]; born 6 April 1994) is a Filipino actress. She began her screen career in television and later appeared in films such as Transit (2013), Baka Bukas (2016), and Siargao (2017).

Curtis-Smith's acting recognitions include Best Supporting Actress at Cinemalaya for Transit, Best Actress at Cinema One Originals for Baka Bukas, and Best Supporting Actress awards from the Metro Manila Film Festival and the Luna Awards for Siargao. She has also received nominations for a FAMAS Award for Best Supporting Actress for Bonifacio: Ang Unang Pangulo (2014), a Gawad Urian Award for Best Supporting Actress for Siargao, three PMPC Star Awards for Movies for Movie Supporting Actress of the Year for Transit, Dementia (2014), and Siargao, and a PMPC Star Award for Television for a Tadhana episode (2019).

In 2018, she signed as an exclusive artist of the GMA Network. She is also the younger sister of fellow actress Anne Curtis.

== Early life ==
She was born on 6 April 1994 in Melbourne, Australia, as the second daughter of Carmencita Ojales, a Filipino, and James Ernest Curtis-Smith (1943–2026), an Australian lawyer. Aside from her older sister Anne, she also has a younger brother named Thomas James, who lives in Melbourne, and had a half-sister named Clare on her father's side who died in 2007 at four months old due to a cardiovascular disease. During her first stay in the Philippines, she studied at St. Paul College in Pasig before returning to Australia in 2005, where she finished her elementary and secondary schooling. She graduated high school from Loyola College in Watsonia, Melbourne. She enrolled as a communication major at the Ateneo de Manila University in 2013. However, she later took a leave of absence to focus on her growing acting career.

== Career ==
=== 2010–2012: Early television career ===
Curtis first came into notice during her vacations in the Philippines visiting her sister Anne, and it was not until mid-2010, when she appeared in ABS-CBN's noontime variety show Showtime, that networks began pushing to sign her. In December 2010, Curtis signed an exclusive three-year contract with TV5 and is being groomed by the network to be one of its Primetime Princesses. In an interview after the contract signing, she mentioned that she felt really happy to have finally settled in TV5 and appreciated the network's decision to allow her to balance her studies and her showbiz career. In 2013, she signed another 3-year contract with TV5.

Curtis' first miniseries for TV5 was a television remake with JC de Vera of the 1991 Philippine action-romance film Ang Utol Kong Hoodlum, which was top billed by Robin Padilla and Vina Morales. Some of the scenes in the series were shot in Curtis's native Australia. In 2012, she played the role of Epifania "Anya" Dionisio in Nandito Ako, where she co-starred with Eula Caballero as Holly Posadas and American Idol season 7 runner-up David Archuleta as Josh Bradley.

=== 2012–2013: Early film career and critical acclaim ===
Curtis started her film career with two independent film productions: Puti, a 2012 psychological thriller in which she played Nika; and Transit, where she played Yael, an Israeli-Filipino child of an Overseas Filipino who faces deportation. Transit received wide critical acclaim, competing at the 18th Busan International Film Festival, receiving 10 awards at the 9th Cinemalaya Independent Film Festival, and eventually became the Philippines' entry to the 86th Academy Awards for Best Foreign Language Film. Curtis' performance as Yael, which required her to quickly learn Hebrew just before production, earned her critical praise from both local and international critics, and earned Curtis the Best Supporting Actress award

2013 also saw her featured on the cover of various magazines in 2013, including Candy, Mega, and with sister Anne was the cover story of the Philippines' maiden issue of ¡Hola!.

=== 2016–2017: Recent projects ===
In 2016, Curtis-Smith won the Best Actress award at the 2016 Cinema One Originals Film Festival for playing the lead role of Alex in the LGBTQ-themed film Baka Bukas (lit. Maybe Tomorrow).

In 2017, Curtis-Smith co-starred in JP Habac's I'm Drunk, I Love You, an arthouse romantic comedy film which quickly became a viral sensation, prompting a viral fan campaign to keep it in cinemas despite lack of studio support. Popularly referred to as "IDILY" (an acronym of the film's title), the film's quirky dialogue and comedic timing turned Curtis (who played the film's romantic "antagonist", Pathy) and co-stars Maja Salvador (Carson) and Paulo Avelino (Dio) into viral meme sensations.

=== 2018–present: As a GMA Network artist ===
On 17 April 2018, Curtis-Smith signed an exclusive contract with GMA Network. Her first drama series in the network was Pamilya Roces. She also appeared in the Philippine adaptation of Korean drama Descendants of the Sun.

She was first paired with Alden Richards in the first installment of the romance-drama anthology I Can See You titled Love on the Balcony, and later on the drama series The World Between Us.

== Method ==
Curtis-Smith describes her method for improving her acting skills as a process of “learning and observing all kinds of people.” Remarking in an interview after winning a Cinema One best actress award for "Baka Bukas" in 2016, she notes: “I watch, but don’t stare. I listen, but don’t eavesdrop. I become inspired, but don’t necessarily imitate. Although in some cases, like in real-life stories, imitation may be required.”

== Advocacy and issues ==
Curtis-Smith has spoken out in public on a number of issues, including body positivity and rural electrification. She has invited Filipino fans to become active voters, and tweeted with dismay when the Philippine Congress almost defunded the Philippines' constitutionally-mandated Commission on Human Rights in 2017.

=== Twinmark Media Facebook issue ===
In February 2021, investigative reporters Camille Elemia and Gelo Gonzales published a report about the social media accounts of several Philippine celebrities – including Curtis-Smith's Facebook account – being used to post propaganda and disinformation favoring the administration of president Rodrigo Duterte.

Vidanes Celebrity Marketing (VCM), Curtis-Smith's management agency at the until a few months later in April 2021, said at the time that Twinmark Media Enterprises, who was their source of the posts and websites involved, had engaged VCM in September 2016 "for social media marketing purposes to promote health-related, positive-vibe articles." VCM said that they were not aware of the content of Curtis-Smith's site, and that they ended "when the posts their talents were asked to share were no longer consistent" with their artists' images.

== Filmography ==
=== Film ===
Movies
Year	Title	Role	Ref(s)
2012	Puti	Nika	
2013	Transit	Yael	
2014	Dementia	Rachel	
2014	Bonifacio: Ang Unang Pangulo	Andrea	
2015	Halik sa Hangin	Quinn / Sister Quinn	
2015	Resureksyon	Amanda	
2016	Imagine You and Me	Clarissa / Isay	
2016	Baka Bukas	Alex	
2017	I'm Drunk, I Love You	Pathy	
2017	Siargao	Abi	
2019	Alone/Together	Aly	
2019	Maledicto	Sister Barbara / Barbie	
2019	Cara X Jagger	Cara	
2019	Culion	Doris	
2020	Alter Me	Aimee	
2021	Midnight in a Perfect World	Mimi	
2021	General Admission	Katja	
2023	In My Mother's Skin	Fairy	
2024	A Glimpse Of Forever	Glenda	
2024	3 Days 2 Nights In Poblacion	Gabbi	
2024	Moneyslapper	Jessa	
2024	Real Life Fiction	Paula	
2025	Open Endings	Hannah	
2025	The Time That Remains		
2025	Manila's Finest	Janette	
TBA	We Could Be in Love	Jasmine Aquino	

=== Television ===
Television series
Year	Title	Role
2011	Ang Utol Kong Hoodlum	Bernadette Grace "Bing" Morrison
2012	Glamorosa	Danica
2012	Nandito Ako	Epifania "Anya" Dionisio
2013	Undercover	Claire
2014	The Replacement Bride	Chynna
2014	Jasmine	Jasmine
2015	My Fair Lady	Audrey Tiuseco
2016	Ang Panday	Alex
2016	Forever Sucks	Izabel
2018	Pamilya Roces	Pearl Renacia Quirante
2019	Sahaya	young Manisan Arati
2020	Descendants of the Sun: The Philippine Adaptation	Moira Defensor
2020	I Can See You: Love on the Balcony	Lea Carbonel
2021–2022	The World Between Us	Emilia "Lia" Libradilla-Asuncion
2024–2025	Asawa ng Asawa Ko	Cristina "Cristy" Salcedo-Manansala / Bangus
2026	Stars on the Floor	Herself (contestant)
TBA	We Could Be in Love	Jasmine Aquino

Guest appearances
Year	Title	Role
2011	Pidol's Wonderland: Jesebilbil Episode	Jessa
2012	Regal Shocker: Perya Part 1	Nicks
2012	Regal Shocker: Perya Part 2	Nicks
2013	Tropa Mo Ko Unli	Various roles
2014	Wattpad Presents: My Tag Boyfriend	Sitti Sandoval
2015	Wattpad Presents: A House Full of Hunks	Venice Montez
2015	Wattpad Presents: Unwanted Girlfriend	Mica
2019	Tadhana: Sex Slave Part 1 & 2	Mila
2019	Daig Kayo ng Lola Ko: When The Clock Strikes at 12	Bikay / Veronica

Hosting
Year	Title	Note
2013	SPINNation	Host
2015	Move It: Clash of the Streetdancers	Host
2018	24 Oras	Substitute Chika Minute anchor
2021; 2022; 2023	All-Out Sundays	Guest host / performer

=== Music video appearances ===
Year	Title	Performer	Director	Ref.
2019	The Power	Duke Dumont and Zak Abel	Paco Raterta	
2020	Nakikinig Ka Ba Sa Akin	Ben&Ben	Jorel Lising	

== Awards and nominations ==
Year	Work	Award	Category	Result	Ref.
2013	Ang Utol Kong Hoodlum	2013 Golden Screen TV Awards	Outstanding Breakthrough Performance by An Actress	Won	
2013	Transit	9th Cinemalaya Independent Film Festival	Best Supporting Actress	Won	
2014	Transit	30th PMPC Star Awards for Movies	Movie Supporting Actress of the Year	Nominated	
2014	Transit	11th Golden Screen Awards	Best Breakthrough Performance by an Actress	Won	
2015	Dementia	31st PMPC Star Awards for Movies	Movie Supporting Actress of the Year	Nominated	
2015	Dementia	17th Gawad Pasado Awards	Pinakapasadong Katuwang na Aktres (Best Supporting Actress)	Nominated	
2015	Bonifacio: Ang Unang Pangulo	2015 FAMAS Awards	Best Supporting Actress	Nominated	
2016	Baka Bukas	2016 Cinema One Originals Film Festival	Best Actress	Won	
2017	Siargao	2017 Metro Manila Film Festival	Best Supporting Actress	Won	
2018	Siargao	41st Gawad Urian	Best Supporting Actress	Nominated	
2018	Siargao	34th PMPC Star Awards for Movies	Movie Supporting Actress of the Year	Nominated	
2018	Siargao	36th Luna Awards	Best Supporting Actress	Won	
2021	Tadhana: Sex Slave Part 1 & 2	34th PMPC Star Awards for Television	Best Single Performance By An Actress	Nominated	
