= Bekikang: Ang Nanay Kong Beki =

2013 Filipino film

- Film poster
- Directed by: Wenn V. Deramas
- Written by: Wenn V. Deramas
- Produced by: Vic del Rosario Jr.
- Starring: Joey Paras; JM Ibañez; Tom Rodriguez; Carla Humphries; Tirso Cruz III
- Cinematography: Elmar Despa
- Edited by: Marya Ignacio
- Music by: Vincent de Jesus
- Production companies: Viva Films; MVP Pictures (uncredited)
- Distributed by: Viva Films
- Release date: October 23, 2013
- Country: Philippines
- Languages: Filipino; English
- Box office: ₱14,101,310.40

Bekikang: Ang Nanay Kong Beki (English: "Bekikang: My Gay Mother") is a 2013 Filipino drama comedy film with an LGBT theme, directed by Wenn V. Deramas.

== Plot ==
This heartwarming and funny Filipino drama-comedy centers on Bekikang, also known as Beki, and his tight-knit group of friends as they explore the complexities of love, identity, and family. Inspired by the life of the late director Wenn Deramas, the film delves into themes of resilience and self-discovery.

Beki, a gay man who faced childhood bullying, learned self-defense from his father. Overcoming many challenges, he grew into a responsible, compassionate, and hardworking individual, deeply caring for his family. With his friends, he sells balut (fertilized duck eggs) on the streets to support his loved ones.

One day, Beki and his friends meet a handsome newcomer, Fortunato, who is being bullied. Beki steps in to protect him, sparking a connection between them. However, Fortunato soon develops feelings for Natalie, a charming waitress at a restaurant Beki frequents. As Fortunato and Natalie grow closer, Beki struggles with jealousy and his unspoken feelings for Fortunato.

When Natalie becomes pregnant and her relationship with Fortunato falls apart, Fortunato decides to leave the country for work. This leaves Beki to care for the child. Though initially hesitant, Beki eventually accepts the baby as his own after learning of Fortunato and Natalie's breakup.

Beki's family disapproves of his decision to raise a child who isn't biologically his, leading him to leave home and move in with his supportive friends. Together, the three gay men provide a stable and loving environment for the child, overcoming challenges along the way.

When Fortunato and Natalie return to reclaim their child, a custody battle ensues. With the couple reunited and intent on raising their child together, the future of the unconventional family Beki and his friends have built hangs in the balance. Will Beki and his friends manage to keep the child, or will Fortunato and Natalie's reunion tear them apart?

== Cast ==
=== Main cast ===
- Joey Paras as Victorio "Beki"
- Tom Rodriguez as Fortunato "Fortune" Ramirez
- JM Ibañez as Fortunato Ramirez Jr. "Potpot"
- Carla Humphries as Natalie Aldo-Ramirez

=== Supporting cast ===
- Tirso Cruz III as Gorio
- Lassy Marquez as Tomas
- Atak Araña as Entoy
- Nikki Valdez as Samantha
- Malou de Guzman as Anacleta
- Maricar de Mesa as Mariana
- Miguel Aguila as Mandy
- Manuel Chua as Dado
- Rubi Rubi as Lydia
- Jeff Luna as Lydia's Helper
- Debraliz as Trudis

=== Special participation and cameo appearances ===
- Janice de Belen as Maristella
- Maricel Soriano as the saleslady
- Andi Eigenmann as the ice cream vendor
- Iza Calzado as the doctor
- Dingdong Dantes as the gay passerby
- Ate Gay as the midwife
- Dey-Dey Amansec as young Beki
- Bea Basa as young Samantha
- Abby Bautista as young Mariana
- Michael Roy Jornales as the fight instructor
- Frank Garcia as Samantha's husband
- Carmen Del Rosario as the yaya/helper
- Jhiz Deocareza as the bully kid
- Eagle Riggs as the gay beauty pageant host

== Planned sequel ==
A sequel was planned as seen from the ending of the movie; however it was not formally announced. Due to the deaths of the director Wenn V. Deramas in 2016 and the lead actor Joey Paras in 2023, the planned sequel is already considered to be shelved.
