= Undercover (2013 TV series) =

- Genre: Drama; Action
- Developed by: Renato Custodio, Jr.
- Directed by: Topel Lee
- Starring: Derek Ramsay; Arci Muñoz; Jasmine Curtis-Smith
- Original languages: Filipino; English
- No. of episodes: 45

Production
- Executive producer: Anabelle T. Macauba
- Production location: Philippines
- Cinematography: Nonong Legaspi
- Running time: 30 minutes

Original release
- Network: TV5
- Release: July 1 – August 30, 2013

Undercover is a 2013 Philippine television drama action series broadcast by TV5. Directed by Topel Lee, it stars Derek Ramsay, Arci Muñoz and Jasmine Curtis-Smith. It aired from July 1 to August 30, 2013.

== Cast ==
- Derek Ramsay as Roy Velasco - Roy is a celebrated investigator who has sent notorious criminals to jail. But his seemingly perfect life ends when he is abducted on the day of his wedding to his long-time girlfriend, Julia. For 6 years, he was imprisoned and subject to psychological torture. Upon his release, he vows to search and punish the person behind his abduction.
- Arci Muñoz as Julia Velasco - Roy's abduction devastates his fiancée, Julia, who takes comfort in Alex, Roy's adoptive brother.
- Jasmine Curtis-Smith as Claire Ramirez - Claire is an IT whiz and gadgets expert who joins Roy's search for his abductors to punish the syndicate that killed her brother.
- Wendell Ramos as Alex Velasco - Alex is Roy's kind and gentle adoptive brother, who ends up marrying Julia after Roy's abduction and presumed death.
- Phillip Salvador as Don Faustino - Don Faustino is a smuggling lord put to jail by Roy. He retaliates by having Roy abducted and imprisoned for 10 years.
- Joross Gamboa as Jimboy - Jimboy is a talented con artist that Roy approached to join his team because of his many connections in the criminal underworld.
- Gerard Acao as Cotton - Cotton is Roy's loyal friend from the task force who joins Roy's mission to uncover the truth behind his abduction.
- Ehra Madrigal-Yeung as Verna
- Christian Samson as Carlo

=== Guest cast ===
- BJ Go as Intoy
- Lito Legaspi as Manolo
- Sophie Albert as Katherine
- Alice Dixson as Sandra

== International Broadcast ==
Country/Region
Vietnam

== See also ==
- List of TV5 (Philippine TV network) original programming
