= Puti (film) =

- Directed by: Miguel Alcazaren
- Written by: Miguel Alcazaren
- Starring: Ian Veneracion; Jasmine Curtis; Lauren Young; Bryan Pagala; Leo Rialp
- Release date: September 18, 2013 (CineFilipino)
- Country: Philippines
- Languages: Tagalog; English

Puti is a 2013 Filipino psychological thriller film about a counterfeit painter who figures in a freak car accident that renders him color blind; while recuperating, strange things start to happen to him.

== Plot ==
Art forger Amir (Ian Veneracion) lives like a recluse with his young son Jaime. His beloved wife died a few years ago and the rest of his family lives abroad. His social interactions are limited to his young assistant Nika (Jasmine Curtis) and his dealer, who sells his forged paintings to rich buyers. There's not a lot of joy in his life. Then Amir and his son are involved in a car crash. He wakes up in hospital and discovers that he's color blind. His son lies in a coma. To pay for Jaime's treatment, Amir has to continue working, which is anything but easy with his condition. The blind woman whose eyes were gouged out by her mother when she was a child and whom he painted just before the accident, starts appearing everywhere. Birds fly out of his canvasses, his paintings show things that weren't there before and in the hospital a mysterious nurse keeps reading the same story to Jaime.

== Cast ==
- Ian Veneracion as Amir
- Jasmine Curtis as Nika
- Lauren Young as Ana
- Bryan Pagala as Jaime
- Leo Rialp
- Maricel Baluan
