= List of Asawa ng Asawa Ko episodes =

Asawa ng Asawa Ko (international title: My Husband's Wife) is a Philippine television drama romance series broadcast by GMA Network. It premiered on January 15, 2024 on the network's Prime line up. The series concluded on January 9, 2025, with a total of 207 episodes. It was replaced by My Ilonggo Girl in its timeslot.

== Series overview ==
| Season | Episodes | Originally released | |
| Season | Episodes | First released | Last released |
|---|---|---|---|
| 1 | 195 | January 15, 2024 | December 19, 2024 |
| 2 | 12 | December 23, 2024 | January 9, 2025 |

== Episodes ==
Asawa ng Asawa Ko episodes
| No. | Title | Original release date |
|---|---|---|
| 1 | "World Premiere" | January 15, 2024 |
| 2 | "Sikretong Kilusan" (transl. secret movement) | January 16, 2024 |
| 3 | "Bangungot" (transl. nightmare) | January 17, 2024 |
| 4 | "Agaw Buhay" (transl. dying) | January 18, 2024 |
| 5 | "Takas" (transl. escape) | January 22, 2024 |
| 6 | "Pagluluksa" (transl. mourning) | January 23, 2024 |
| 7 | "Kamatayan" (transl. death) | January 24, 2024 |
| 8 | "Impyerno" (transl. hell) | January 25, 2024 |
| 9 | "Raos at Dusa" (transl. scrape and suffer) | January 29, 2024 |
| 10 | "Bagong Buhay" (transl. new life) | January 30, 2024 |
| 11 | "New Chapter" | January 31, 2024 |
| 12 | "Para sa Pag-ibig" (transl. for love) | February 1, 2024 |
| 13 | "Bagong Asawa" (transl. new wife) | February 5, 2024 |
| 14 | "Bagong Ina" (transl. new mother) | February 6, 2024 |
| 15 | "Pamilyang Huwad" (transl. fake family) | February 7, 2024 |
| 16 | "Rebelyon" (transl. rebelion) | February 8, 2024 |
| 17 | "Mga Taksil" (transl. traitors) | February 12, 2024 |
| 18 | "Itigil ang Kasal!" (transl. stop the wedding!) | February 13, 2024 |
| 19 | "Pagbabalik ni Cristy" (transl. return of Cristy) | February 14, 2024 |
| 20 | "Muling Pagkikita" (transl. meeting again) | February 15, 2024 |
| 21 | "Sikreto Kay Cristy" (transl. secret for Cristy) | February 19, 2024 |
| 22 | "Asawa o Kabit?" (transl. wife or mistress?) | February 20, 2024 |
| 23 | "Secret Arrangement" | February 21, 2024 |
| 24 | "Major Betrayal" | February 22, 2024 |
| 25 | "Pagpaparaya" (transl. giving way) | February 26, 2024 |
| 26 | "Pagluluksa ng mga Asawa" (transl. mourning of the wives) | February 27, 2024 |
| 27 | "Ang Pinili ni Jordan" (transl. the choice of Jordan) | February 28, 2024 |
| 28 | "Tunay na Mommy" (transl. real mommy) | February 29, 2024 |
| 29 | "Dalawang Ina" (transl. two mothers) | March 4, 2024 |
| 30 | "Aksyon ni Jordan" (transl. action of Jordan) | March 5, 2024 |
| 31 | "Adobo vs. Bicol Express" | March 6, 2024 |
| 32 | "War of Wives" | March 7, 2024 |
| 33 | "Blackmail" | March 11, 2024 |
| 34 | "Suicide Mission" | March 12, 2024 |
| 35 | "Desperadong Shaira" (transl. desperate Shaira) | March 13, 2024 |
| 36 | "Mainit na Shaira" (transl. furious Shaira) | March 14, 2024 |
| 37 | "Pagdating ng Leon" (transl. arrival of Leon) | March 18, 2024 |
| 38 | "Stalker Spy Siblings" | March 19, 2024 |
| 39 | "Mga Asawa ni Cristy" (transl. husbands of Cristy) | March 20, 2024 |
| 40 | "Buong Katotohanan" (transl. entire truth) | March 21, 2024 |
| 41 | "Blood Trail" | March 25, 2024 |
| 42 | "Ang Pinagmulan" (transl. the cause) | March 26, 2024 |
| 43 | "Supermarket Showdown" | March 27, 2024 |
| 44 | "Lihim na Pagbubuntis" (transl. secret pregnancy) | April 1, 2024 |
| 45 | "Poot ni Shaira" (transl. Shaira's anger) | April 2, 2024 |
| 46 | "Paternity Test" | April 3, 2024 |
| 47 | "Ang Resulta" (transl. the result) | April 4, 2024 |
| 48 | "Pekeng Resulta" (transl. fake result) | April 8, 2024 |
| 49 | "Remove the Baby" | April 9, 2024 |
| 50 | "Pagbabalik ni Leon" (transl. return of Leon) | April 10, 2024 |
| 51 | "Hindi Kay Jordan" (transl. not for Jordan) | April 11, 2024 |
| 52 | "Kumpirmadong Ama" (transl. confirmed father) | April 15, 2024 |
| 53 | "Grand Reveal" | April 16, 2024 |
| 54 | "Poot at Pagsisi" (transl. anger and regret) | April 17, 2024 |
| 55 | "Carmen vs. Shaira" | April 18, 2024 |
| 56 | "Ganti ng Halik" (transl. revenge of a kiss) | April 22, 2024 |
| 57 | "Buntis Din" (transl. pregnant too) | April 23, 2024 |
| 58 | "Bagong Buhay" (transl. new life) | April 24, 2024 |
| 59 | "Ikaw ang Ama" (transl. you're the father) | April 25, 2024 |
| 60 | "Drama ni Shaira" (transl. drama of Shaira) | April 29, 2024 |
| 61 | "Bugbog Sarado" (transl. heavily beaten) | April 30, 2024 |
| 62 | "Misyon ni Leon" (transl. mission of Leon) | May 1, 2024 |
| 63 | "Kulong" (transl. jail) | May 2, 2024 |
| 64 | "Ako ang Reyna" (transl. I'm the queen) | May 6, 2024 |
| 65 | "Babawiin Ko ang Asawa Ko" (transl. I'll take back my spouse) | May 7, 2024 |
| 66 | "Laya na" (transl. already freed) | May 8, 2024 |
| 67 | "Patayin si Bangus" (transl. kill Bangus) | May 9, 2024 |
| 68 | "Bagong Leon" (transl. new Leon) | May 13, 2024 |
| 69 | "Buntis vs. Buntis" (transl. pregnant vs. pregnant) | May 14, 2024 |
| 70 | "Nakakahiya" (transl. embarrassing) | May 15, 2024 |
| 71 | "Lukso ng Dugo" (transl. leap of blood) | May 16, 2024 |
| 72 | "Paalam Na" (transl. goodbye now) | May 20, 2024 |
| 73 | "Ako ang Asawa" (transl. I'm the spouse) | May 21, 2024 |
| 74 | "Kabit Ako" (transl. I'm a mistress) | May 22, 2024 |
| 75 | "Annulled" | May 23, 2024 |
| 76 | "Pagdukot" (transl. abduction) | May 27, 2024 |
| 77 | "Pagbawi kay Tori" (transl. taking back Tori) | May 28, 2024 |
| 78 | "Sugod ni Cristy" (transl. Cristy's invasion) | May 29, 2024 |
| 79 | "Pamilya vs. Kalasag" (transl. family vs. Kalasag) | May 30, 2024 |
| 80 | "Crossfire" | June 3, 2024 |
| 81 | "Mahal Pa Rin" (transl. I still love) | June 4, 2024 |
| 82 | "Final Pagpapalaya" | June 5, 2024 |
| 83 | "Lihim ng Magkapatid" (transl. siblings' secret) | June 6, 2024 |
| 84 | "Galawang Kalasag" (transl. Kalasag moves) | June 10, 2024 |
| 85 | "Lihim na Ugnayan" (transl. secret relationship) | June 11, 2024 |
| 86 | "Galit kay Leon" (transl. angry at Leon) | June 12, 2024 |
| 87 | "Banta ni Shaira" (transl. Shaira's threat) | June 13, 2024 |
| 88 | "Tunay na Ama" (transl. real father) | June 17, 2024 |
| 89 | "Magkalimutan Na" (transl. forgetting each other) | June 18, 2024 |
| 90 | "'Di Na Maloloko" (transl. can't be fooled) | June 19, 2024 |
| 91 | "Basagan ng Puso at Ulo" (transl. breaking of heart and head) | June 20, 2024 |
| 92 | "Sikretong Pagdukot" (transl. secret abduction) | June 24, 2024 |
| 93 | "Patayin si Jeff" (transl. kill Jeff) | June 25, 2024 |
| 94 | "Shaira in Panic" | June 26, 2024 |
| 95 | "Bridezilla" | June 27, 2024 |
| 96 | "Pagtakas ni Jeff" (transl. Jeff's escape) | July 1, 2024 |
| 97 | "Kasalan at Kasalanan" (transl. wedding and sin) | July 2, 2024 |
| 98 | "Banggaan ng Kasal" (transl. wedding clash) | July 3, 2024 |
| 99 | "Plan Sabotage" | July 4, 2024 |
| 100 | "Backfire" | July 8, 2024 |
| 101 | "Walang Atrasan" (transl. no going back) | July 9, 2024 |
| 102 | "Blackmail" | July 10, 2024 |
| 103 | "Couple Clash" | July 11, 2024 |
| 104 | "Sikreto ng Magkakapatid" (transl. siblings' secret) | July 15, 2024 |
| 105 | "Billie" | July 16, 2024 |
| 106 | "Agaw Buhay" (transl. dying) | July 17, 2024 |
| 107 | "Mga Pagtakas" (transl. the fugitives) | July 18, 2024 |
| 108 | "Pagdating ng Tigre" (transl. the tiger's arrival) | July 22, 2024 |
| 109 | "Nakaraang Pag-ibig" (transl. past love) | July 23, 2024 |
| 110 | "Ex-wife vs. Fiancee" | July 24, 2024 |
| 111 | "Laban Para kay Billie" (transl. fight for billie) | July 25, 2024 |
| 112 | "Investigation" | July 29, 2024 |
| 113 | "Exes" | July 30, 2024 |
| 114 | "Confused" | July 31, 2024 |
| 115 | "Old Look, New Love" | August 1, 2024 |
| 116 | "Dating Asawa" (transl. ex-husband) | August 5, 2024 |
| 117 | "Secret Siblings" | August 6, 2024 |
| 118 | "Huling Gabi" | August 7, 2024 |
| 119 | "Wedding Surprise" | August 8, 2024 |
| 120 | "Asawang May Sala" (transl. sinful wife) | August 12, 2024 |
| 121 | "Threat" | August 13, 2024 |
| 122 | "Pagluluksa" (transl. mourning) | August 14, 2024 |
| 123 | "Brother's Love" | August 15, 2024 |
| 124 | "Leon's Guilt" | August 19, 2024 |
| 125 | "Misyon sa Bundok" (transl. mission in the forest) | August 20, 2024 |
| 126 | "Sakripisyo at Selos" (transl. sacrifice and jealousy) | August 21, 2024 |
| 127 | "Bracelet" | August 22, 2024 |
| 128 | "Desperado" (transl. desperate) | August 26, 2024 |
| 129 | "Salawahan" (transl. fickle) | August 27, 2024 |
| 130 | "Double Cross" | August 28, 2024 |
| 131 | "Pagsabog" (transl. explosion) | August 29, 2024 |
| 132 | "Giyera Na sa GMA Prime" (transl. Time for War on GMA Prime) | September 2, 2024 |
| 133 | "Sedated" | September 3, 2024 |
| 134 | "Secret Move" | September 4, 2024 |
| 135 | "Kabaliwan" (transl. craze) | September 5, 2024 |
| 136 | "Labanan ang Kalaban" (transl. fight the enemy) | September 9, 2024 |
| 137 | "Litong Puso" (transl. confused heart) | September 10, 2024 |
| 138 | "Muling Ibalik" (transl. bring back) | September 11, 2024 |
| 139 | "Sukdulang Kasamaan" (transl. extreme evil) | September 12, 2024 |
| 140 | "The Kiss" | September 16, 2024 |
| 141 | "Pagbubunyag" (transl. revelation) | September 17, 2024 |
| 142 | "Pagiisang Dibdib" | September 18, 2024 |
| 143 | "Pagsisiwalat" (transl. revelation) | September 19, 2024 |
| 144 | "Desperate Moves" | September 23, 2024 |
| 145 | "Pagliligtas" (transl. save) | September 24, 2024 |
| 146 | "Proposals" | September 25, 2024 |
| 147 | "Bayad sa Kasalanan" (transl. payment for the sin) | September 26, 2024 |
| 148 | "Rejection" | September 30, 2024 |
| 149 | "Malaking Pasabog" (transl. big surprise) | October 1, 2024 |
| 150 | "Bagong Buhay" (transl. new life) | October 2, 2024 |
| 151 | "Pangamba" | October 3, 2024 |
| 152 | "Malaking Panganib" | October 7, 2024 |
| 153 | "Hinagpis ng Ina" | October 8, 2024 |
| 154 | "Walang Iwanan" | October 9, 2024 |
| 155 | "Pagtakas sa Lungkot" | October 10, 2024 |
| 156 | "Sad Truth" | October 14, 2024 |
| 157 | "Planong Pagganti" | October 15, 2024 |
| 158 | "Sabotage" | October 16, 2024 |
| 159 | "Miserable" | October 17, 2024 |
