= Asawa ng Asawa Ko =

Philippine television drama series

- Title card
- Also known as: My Husband's Wife
- Genre: Romantic drama
- Created by: Agnes Gagelonia-Uligan
- Written by: Agnes Gagelonia-Uligan; Glaiza Ramirez; Marlon Miguel; Renato Custodio
- Directed by: Laurice Guillen
- Creative director: Aloy Adlawan
- Starring: Jasmine Curtis-Smith; Rayver Cruz; Liezel Lopez
- Theme music composer: Rina Mercado; Ann Figueroa
- Opening theme: "Sa Akin Siya" by Crystal Paras and Jennifer Maravilla
- Country of origin: Philippines
- Original language: Tagalog
- No. of episodes: 207 (list of episodes)

Production
- Executive producer: Erwin Manzano Hilado
- Cinematography: Jay Abello
- Editors: Ver Custodio; Ed Esmedia; Jenny Rose Oropesa
- Camera setup: Multiple-camera setup
- Running time: 22–32 minutes
- Production company: GMA Entertainment Group

Original release
- Network: GMA Network
- Release: January 15, 2024 – January 9, 2025

Asawa ng Asawa Ko (transl. spouse of my spouse / international title: My Husband's Wife) is a Philippine television drama romance series broadcast by GMA Network. Directed by Laurice Guillen, it stars Jasmine Curtis-Smith, Rayver Cruz and Liezel Lopez in the title role. It premiered on January 15, 2024 on the network's Prime line up. The series concluded on January 9, 2025, with a total of 207 episodes.

The series is streaming online on YouTube.

== Premise ==
The life of the married couple – Cristy and Jordan faces a big change, when Cristy gets abducted and presumed dead. Jordan marries Shaira. Years later, Cristy returns to Jordan's life after she escapes from her abductors.

== Cast and characters ==
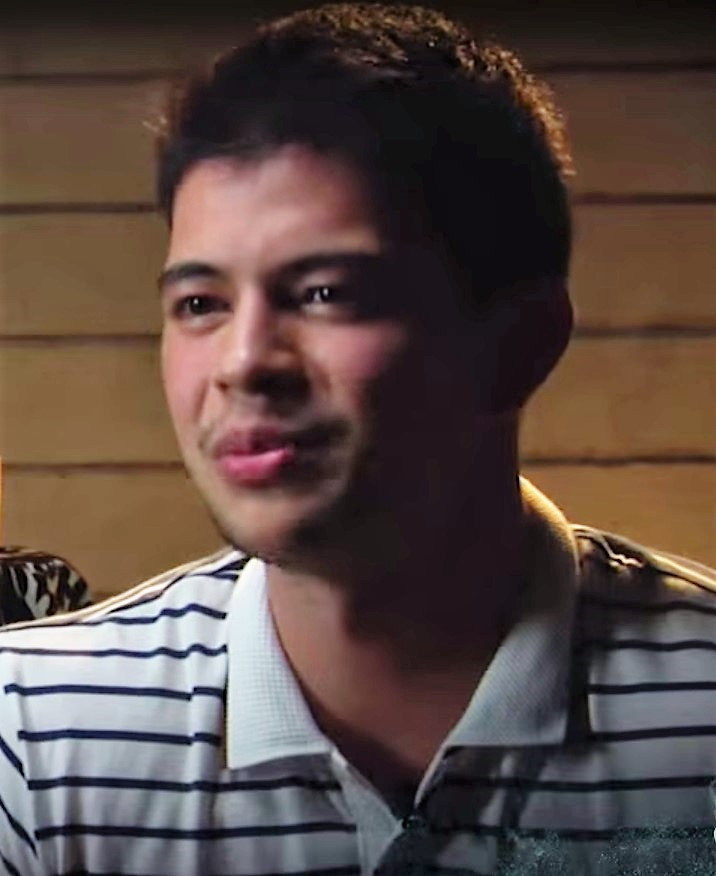
Rayver Cruz portrays Jordan Manansala.

Lead cast

- Jasmine Curtis-Smith as Cristina "Cristy" Salcedo-Manansala / Bangus
- Rayver Cruz as Jordan Manansala
- Liezel Lopez as Shaira "Shai" Lozano-Manansala

Supporting cast

- Martin del Rosario as Jeffrey "Jeff" Manansala
- Joem Bascon as Leonardo "Leon" Lozano
- Gina Alajar as Carmen Salcedo
- Mariz Ricketts as Pusit
- Kim de Leon as Kuwago
- Bruce Roeland as Bakulaw
- Luis Hontiveros as Argel "Alakdan" Reyes
- Crystal Paras as Nonette
- Jennifer Maravilla as Sawa
- Quinn Carillo as Leslie
- Billie Hakenson as Buwaya
- Ian Ignacio as Igat
- Patricia Joanne Coma as Billie "Pusa" R. Lozano
- Nicolle Baker as Victoria "Tori" S. Manansala
- Renerich Ocon as Meldy

Recurring cast

- Kylie Padilla as Hannah "Tigre" Rodriguez-Lozano

Guest cast

- Tom Olivar as Jaguar
- Elizabeth Oropesa as Usa
- Ashley Rivera as Eunice
- Faye Lorenzo as Verna "Mariposa"

== Production ==
Principal photography commenced in July 2023.

== Ratings ==
According to AGB Nielsen Philippines' Nationwide Urban Television Audience Measurement People in television homes, the pilot episode of Asawa ng Asawa Ko earned a 4.7% rating.

== Accolades ==
Accolades received by Asawa ng Asawa Ko
Year	Award	Category	Recipient	Result	Ref.
2025	36th PMPC Star Awards for Television	Best New Female TV Personality	Quinn Carrillo	Nominated	
