= The Buy Bust Queen =

2022 Philippine action film

- Theatrical release poster
- Directed by: JR Olinares
- Written by: Lawrence Nicodemus
- Starring: Phoebe Walker; Wilkins Villanueva; Ritz Azul; Maxine Medina; Elaine Ochoa; Ayeesha Cervantes; Cheng Alessa; Ameera Johara; Ervic Vijandre; Alex Medina
- Cinematography: Jimboy Signo; Rico Jacinto
- Edited by: Cre8team Multimedia
- Music by: Jake Abella
- Production companies: Pinoyflix Films; Philippine Drug Enforcement Agency
- Distributed by: Pinoyflix Films
- Release dates: March 23, 2022 (One Mall); June 16, 2022 (Pagadian); February 28, 2024
- Running time: 90 minutes
- Country: Philippines
- Languages: English; Filipino

The Buy Bust Queen, or simply Buybust Queen, is a 2022 Philippine action film about the women leading the operations of the Philippine Drug Enforcement Agency (PDEA). Directed by JR Olinares from a screenplay by Lawrence Nicodemus, it stars Phoebe Walker as the titular character along with PDEA Director Gen. Wilkins Villanueva as himself. The film was produced by Pinoyflix Films in cooperation with PDEA to be an "advocacy film" that portrays the agency in a positive light during the Philippine drug war, with its premiere held on March 23, 2022, in Valenzuela City, Metro Manila. The film was given a nationwide release on February 28, 2024.

== Plot ==
This tale centers on seven exceptional women who defy gender norms, showcasing their unwavering dedication and resilience in joining an institution traditionally dominated by men. Their commitment stems from a lifetime of virtues, forming an unshakable foundation that cannot be easily replicated.

== Cast ==
- Phoebe Walker as Gianne Regalado
- Dir. Gen. Wilkins Villanueva as himself
- Ritz Azul as Angela Bustamante
- Maxine Medina as Thalia Estevez
- Elaine Ochoa as Michelle Dalangin
- Ayeesha Cervantes as Sofia Montano
- Cheng Alessa as Louise Castillo
  - Angelu Malvar as young Louise
- Ameera Johara as Laiza Cuyugan
- Ervic Vijandre as Aldrin Dimaano
- Alex Medina as Ivan dela Rosa
- Jeric Raval as Enrico Salvador
- Jeffrey Santos as Carlo Cabahug
- Ricardo Cepeda as Marcelo Jacinto
- Gil Caesar Castro as himself
- Ahlcyrus de Leon as Joseph Anthony Madrigal
- Christian Vasquez as Fernando Baltazar
- Dindo Arroyo as Goh Tong Lee
- Ping Medina as Zandro Lopez
- Danj So Bless as Edward Jones
- Peter Georgo as Jorge Escobar

== Production ==
=== Filming ===
In October 2021, the cast started to lock-in taping in Kalinga-Apayao and shoot some of the scene around Antipolo and Quezon City.

== Release ==
The Buy Bust Queen held its press conference and premiere on March 23, 2022, at the One Sky Theater within One Mall in Valenzuela City, Metro Manila.

== Reception ==
Goldwin Reviews gave the film a negative one out of five stars and wrote: "The story is so overdone. The Buy Bust Queen title is not suitable because this is a Joker."

== See also ==
- Badge of Honor: To Serve and Protect, a 2018 advocacy film also produced by Pinoyflix Films
- BuyBust, a 2018 action thriller film
