= Alex Medina =

Filipino actor

Alex Vincent Medina
- Born: Alex Vincent Chupungco Medina; May 26, 1986 (age 40); Manila, Philippines
- Other names: Alex Vincent, Alex Medina
- Education: San Beda College
- Occupation: Actor
- Years active: 2008–present
- Agent: Freelancer (2008–present)
- Television: ABS-CBN; GMA Network; TV5 Network
- Height: 5 ft 9 in (1.75 m)
- Relatives: Pen Medina (father); Ping Medina (brother)

Alex Vincent Chupungco Medina (born May 26, 1986) is a Filipino film and television actor. He is known for his roles in various indie films. He portrayed Diego/Joshua in the soap opera Ina, Kapatid, Anak. He is the son of Pen Medina and brother of Ping Medina.

Medina won the best actor award in the Cinema One Originals Film Festival for the film Palitan.

== Early life and background ==
Medina was born and raised in Manila, Philippines. He is the son of veteran Filipino actor Pen Medina. He has three brothers: Karl, Ping and Victor, who are also actors. He also has four younger siblings: Japs, Victor, Zeth and JL.

Medina studied Marketing and Corporate Communications at San Beda College until he dropped out to focus on his acting career.

== Career ==
=== Early works – 2012 ===
Medina started acting in student films for fine arts majors at the University of the Philippines, Diliman. His on-screen debut was in the film Concerto in 2008. This film, set in the World War II era, was part of the Cinemalaya Independent Film Festival and received accolades and positive feedback.

In 2009, Medina signed a management agreement with Manny Valera. He subsequently played supporting roles in several films including Fidel and Iliw.

In 2011, he was cast in the film Ka Oryang playing a minor role, but he was brought to the attention of various directors and independent film makers when his later films received accolades locally and internationally.

In 2012, he starred in the UP-Diliman film Balang Araw directed by Archie Dimaculangan. The following month, he worked on several different indie films including Mariposa: Sa Hawla Ng Gabi and Pascalina.

Medina's next big role was in Palitan, in which he played the main character Nestor, a desperate, underdog employee who is deeply in debt to his boss. Nestor was a daring role and featured his first appearance in an erotic scene in a motion picture. His work in the film was well received by critics. His last indie film in 2012 was Supremo, in which he played a supporting role.

In the 2012 Cinema One Originals Film Festival, Medina's indie films won various awards including: Mariposa: Sa Hawla Ng Gabi which won an award for Michael Espanol for Best Production Design; Pascalina, and Palitan for which he won Best Actor while his co-star Mara Lopez won Best Actress.

After this win, ABS-CBN picked Medina for the role of Diego in the hit prime time drama series Ina, Kapatid, Anak, his first television appearance. Medina's role was initially supposed to be played by Rayver Cruz, but he turned it down because of his busy schedule.

=== 2013–present ===
Medina's breakthrough performance in ABS-CBN's Ina, Kapatid, Anak generally received positive reviews from critics. He played the role Diego, the rebellious and vengeful long-lost son of Theresa (played by Cherry Pie Picache). While shooting from January to May 2013, he simultaneously taped another indie film Babagwa, which was also an entry for the 9th Cinemalaya Independent Film Festival. Medina guested in afternoon fantasy drama series My Little Juan.

In 2014, Medina appeared in Two Wives.

== Filmography ==
=== Film ===
Year	Title	Role	Ref.
2008	Concerto	Nardo	
2009	Fidel	Fidel's friend	
2009	Iliw		
2011	Ka Oryang		
2012	Balang Araw		
2012	Mariposa: Sa Hawla ng Gabi		
2012	Pascalina		
2012	Palitan	Nestor	
2012	24/7 in Love	Jiggie	
2012	Supremo	Procopio Bonifacio	
2013	Babagwa	Greg	
2013	Angustia	Don Victorino Hernandez	
2014	Third Eye	Cenon	
2014	K'na, the Dreamweaver	Kagis	
2014	The Janitor	Roger Ponce	
2015	Kid Kulafu	Rosalio Pacquiao	
2015	The Love Affair	Cedric	
2015	Heneral Luna	Jose Bernal	
2015	Felix Manalo	Avelina's husband	
2016	Echorsis	Carlo	
2016	Dukot	Jimbo	
2016	How to Be Yours	Pio	
2016	Camp Sawi	Nelson	
2017	Angelito	Jose Bernal	
2017	Historiographika Errata		
2017	Smaller and Smaller Circles	Carding	
2018	We Will Not Die Tonight		
2018	Mga Anak ng Kamote		
2019	Tayo sa Huling Buwan ng Taon	Frank	
2022	The Buy Bust Queen	Ivan dela Rosa	
2023	Erotica Manila		
2023	Layas		
2025	Sampung Utos Kay Josh	Holdupper	
2025	In Thy Name	Rosebert	
2025	Postmortem		
2025	Song of the Fireflies		

=== Television ===
Year	Title	Role	Ref.
2012–2013	Ina, Kapatid, Anak	Diego Medina / Joshua Buenaventura	
2013	My Little Juan	Jethro Sanchez	
2013	Wagas	Astro	
2014	Ipaglaban Mo: Niloko Niyo Ako	George	
2014	Wagas	Anaceto	
2014–2015	Two Wives	Marlon Aguiluz	
2015	Ipaglaban Mo: Dahil Mahal Mo Siya	Romy	
2015	S.O.C.O.: Scene of the Crime Operatives	Shabbir Ponferrada	
2015–2016	Pangako Sa'Yo	Simon Barcial	
2016	FPJ's Ang Probinsyano	Allen	
2016	My Super D	Mario	
2016	Karelasyon: Tatay-tatayan	Elvie	
2016	Karelasyon: Tenant	New Tenant	
2016	A1 Ko Sa 'Yo	Jessie Potrero	
2016	Ipaglaban Mo: Tapat	Rey	
2016–2017	The Greatest Love	Alexander "Sandro" Sobrevista	
2017	Ipaglaban Mo: Pagkakasala	Ruel	
2017	Ipaglaban Mo: Saklolo	Alvin Salonga	
2017	The Good Son	Arthur Moreno	
2017	Tadhana:143 NZ	Estong	
2018	Wagas	Tasing	
2018	Precious Hearts Romances Presents: Los Bastardos	Young Bert Esperanza	
2018–2019	Playhouse	Manuelito "Manny" Bradford Hawkins	
2020	24/7	Young Dado	
2021	Owe My Love	Enrico Alcancia	
2022	Love You Stranger	Bill Agustin	
2023	The Iron Heart	Koa Belarmino	
2023	Imbestigador: Finale	Bart	
2023–2024	Can't Buy Me Love	Felix	
2024	Makiling	Neil Damban	
2024	FPJ's Batang Quiapo	Young Marcelo Macaraig	
2024	Abot-Kamay na Pangarap	Empoy	
2025	Incognito	Joel	
2025	Sins of the Father	Norlan Gonzales	
2025–2026	Sanggang Dikit FR	Sonny	
2026	Magpakailanman: Sa Kabila ng Lahat	Danny	
2026	Blood vs Duty	Ramli	
2026	My Bespren Emman	Raul	
2026	Love Is Never Gone	Eric	
2026	Magpakailanman: Ganti ni Misis	Antonio	
