= Baka Bukas =

- Theatrical release poster
- Directed by: Samantha Lee
- Written by: Samantha Lee
- Produced by: Ronald Arguelles
- Starring: Jasmine Curtis-Smith; Louise delos Reyes
- Cinematography: Sasha Palomares
- Edited by: Ilsa Malsi
- Music by: Denise Santos
- Production companies: Cinema One Originals; Creative Programs, Inc.
- Distributed by: Star Cinema (Philippines)
- Release dates: November 14, 2016 (Cinema One Originals); March 1, 2017 (Philippines)
- Running time: 84 minutes
- Country: Philippines
- Language: Filipino

Baka Bukas (transl. Maybe Tomorrow) is a 2016 Philippine romantic drama independent film written, co-produced, and directed by Samantha Lee in her feature film directorial debut. Starring Jasmine Curtis-Smith and Louise delos Reyes, the film tells the story of Alex (Curtis-Smith), a lesbian who starts falling for her best friend Jess (delos Reyes).

The film first premiered at the 2016 Cinema One Originals film festival, where it won the Audience Choice Award, Best Sound, and Best Actress award for Curtis-Smith. In 2017, Star Cinema acquired the film's distribution rights, along with that of another LGBT-themed film 2 Cool 2 Be 4gotten; it had a wide release on March 1 that year.

== Plot ==
Alex is a 23-year-old lesbian creative who juggles multiple jobs. Her family and friends are aware of her sexual orientation except for her best friend Jess, whom she is secretly in love with. An angry phone call from Alex's ex-girlfriend reveals the truth and Jess is in disbelief that Alex managed to hide that side of herself from her. After promising that nothing will change between them, Jess starts to entertain the idea of having feelings for Alex. They kiss one night, and eventually begin to explore a romantic relationship with each other.

Being a budding actress who had her big break in the business only recently, Jess has to hide her dating life which Alex struggles with. Jess insists it could still work, but Alex decides that she has to end it. She asks Jess to give her 60 days after their break-up to move on before they can go back to being friends, but Alex is unable to hold up her end of the deal and they do not meet again until more than a year later at their mutual friend's birthday party.

== Cast ==
- Jasmine Curtis-Smith as Alex
- Louise delos Reyes as Jess
- Kate Alejandrino as Kate
- Nelsito Gomez as David
- Gio Gahol as Julo

== Production ==
=== Development ===
Baka Bukas is Samantha Lee's directorial debut film. As a lesbian herself, Lee developed the concept for the film based on her own relationship with a female partner. Furthermore, she stated in an interview for CNN Philippines:

Baka Bukas is the story of what happens when you fall in love with your best friend. I conceptualized the film because I wanted to see a representation of the LGBT community that went beyond the portrayals that are shown in mainstream media. The characters in this film are fully flawed functional human beings. They are more than just an accessory to the plot, they are the plot.

Lee wrote the screenplay in 10 days.

=== Filming ===
The film features a kissing scene between Jasmine Curtis-Smith and Louise delos Reyes. Though she admitted being nervous about the scene beforehand, Curtis-Smith told interviews that she was eventually comfortable in performing the scene, as was delos Reyes. The scene took three takes to finish.

=== Music ===
The film's score was composed by Denise Santos. Santos is affiliated with Bleeding Fingers Music, a partnership between noted score composer Hans Zimmer and Sony Music, where she works as an in-house composer.

Baka Bukas (Original Score)

Film score by Denise Santos
- Released: November 18, 2016
- Recorded: 2016
- Genre: Film score
- Length: 17:09

Track listing

All music composed by Denise Santos, except where noted.

Baka Bukas (Original Score)
No.	Title	Length
1.	"We Were Never Really Just Friends"	2:22
2.	"Car Song" (Composed with B. P. Valenzuela)	1:29
3.	"Masks" (Composed with B. P. Valenzuela)	3:26
4.	"If I Could Live in This Montage,"	3:12
5.	"Tayo?"	1:49
6.	"Friends?"	1:19
7.	"Like Nothing Ever Happened"	1:17
8.	"Just This"	2:55
Total length:		17:09

== Release ==
Baka Bukas was one of the finalists at the 2016 Cinema One Originals film festival's original lineup. The film premiered on November 14–22, 2016. During the festival's awarding ceremony held at the Dolphy Theatre on November 20, Baka Bukas won three awards. The film received the Audience Choice Award and Best Sound, and the Best Actress went to Jasmine Curtis-Smith.

In February 2017, the film was confirmed to have earned distribution rights from Star Cinema. The film had a wide release on March 1.

=== Reception ===
Philbert Dy of The Neighborhood said in his review:

Baka Bukas doesn't really work as a whole, but there are moments that are genuinely affecting. In general, the film just works better the more personal it gets, the deeper it delves into the psychology of its main character and her relationship with the world at large. With a great lead performance, the film just benefits from having a narrower focus. When it veers away from that, when it becomes about the other characters and the world at large, the film just doesn’t feel as strong. There is real value in what comes out of this film, but the journey there is a lot rougher than it needs to be.

Oggs Cruz of Rappler said:

There are films that require roughness to work. Baka Bukas does not even need this, but it could use a subtle edge. Still, the characters remain the bright, bubbly and talkative millennials that they are. The result is a film that has been dulled by its vapid devotion to the pastel-colored romance between its two leads. Lee wastes her intriguing milieu, conveniently latching on to all the tropes and stereotypes instead of adding to it. In the end, the film feels like a non-event, a failed exploration of emotions that are as fleeting as all the words that Lee’s characters repetitively deliver.

== Accolades ==
Awards
Year	Award	Category	Recipient(s)	Outcome	Ref(s)
2016
2016	Cinema One Originals Film Festival				
2016	Cinema One Originals Film Festival	Audience Choice Award	Baka Bukas	Won	
2016	Cinema One Originals Film Festival	Best Sound	Baka Bukas	Won	
2016	Cinema One Originals Film Festival	Best Actress	Jasmine Curtis-Smith	Won	
