= Kambal Sirena =

2014 Philippine television drama series

- Title card
- Also known as: Footsteps of a Mermaid
- Genre: Drama; Romantic fantasy
- Created by: Dode Cruz
- Written by: Dode Cruz; Luningning Ribay; Christine Novicio
- Directed by: DonDon Santos
- Creative director: Jun Lana
- Starring: Louise delos Reyes
- Theme music composer: Janno Gibbs
- Opening theme: "Sa Iyong Mundo" by Julie Anne San Jose and Rita De Guzman
- Country of origin: Philippines
- Original language: Tagalog
- No. of episodes: 78

Production
- Executive producer: Kaye Atienza-Cadsawan
- Production locations: Quezon City, Philippines
- Editors: Benedict Lavastida; Robert Ryan Reyes
- Camera setup: Multiple-camera setup
- Running time: 23–41 minutes
- Production company: GMA Entertainment TV

Original release
- Network: GMA Network
- Release: March 10 – June 27, 2014

Kambal Sirena (transl. twin mermaid / international title: Footsteps of a Mermaid) is a 2014 Philippine television drama fantasy romance series broadcast by GMA Network. Directed by DonDon Santos, it stars Louise delos Reyes in the title role. It premiered on March 10, 2014 on the network's Telebabad line up. The series concluded on June 27, 2014, with a total of 78 episodes.

The series is streaming online on YouTube.

== Premise ==
Twins Alona and Perlas are born with unusual features — one is born with gills and the other with a mermaid's tail. Worried by how would their neighbors react, their mother decides to move along with them to an isolated island. The twins have to live separately. Living with her mother, Perlas works in an ocean park. While Alona lives as a princess within the confines of the water, the kingdom of Sirenadia. Eventually the twins will fall in love with Kevin.

== Cast and characters ==
Cast

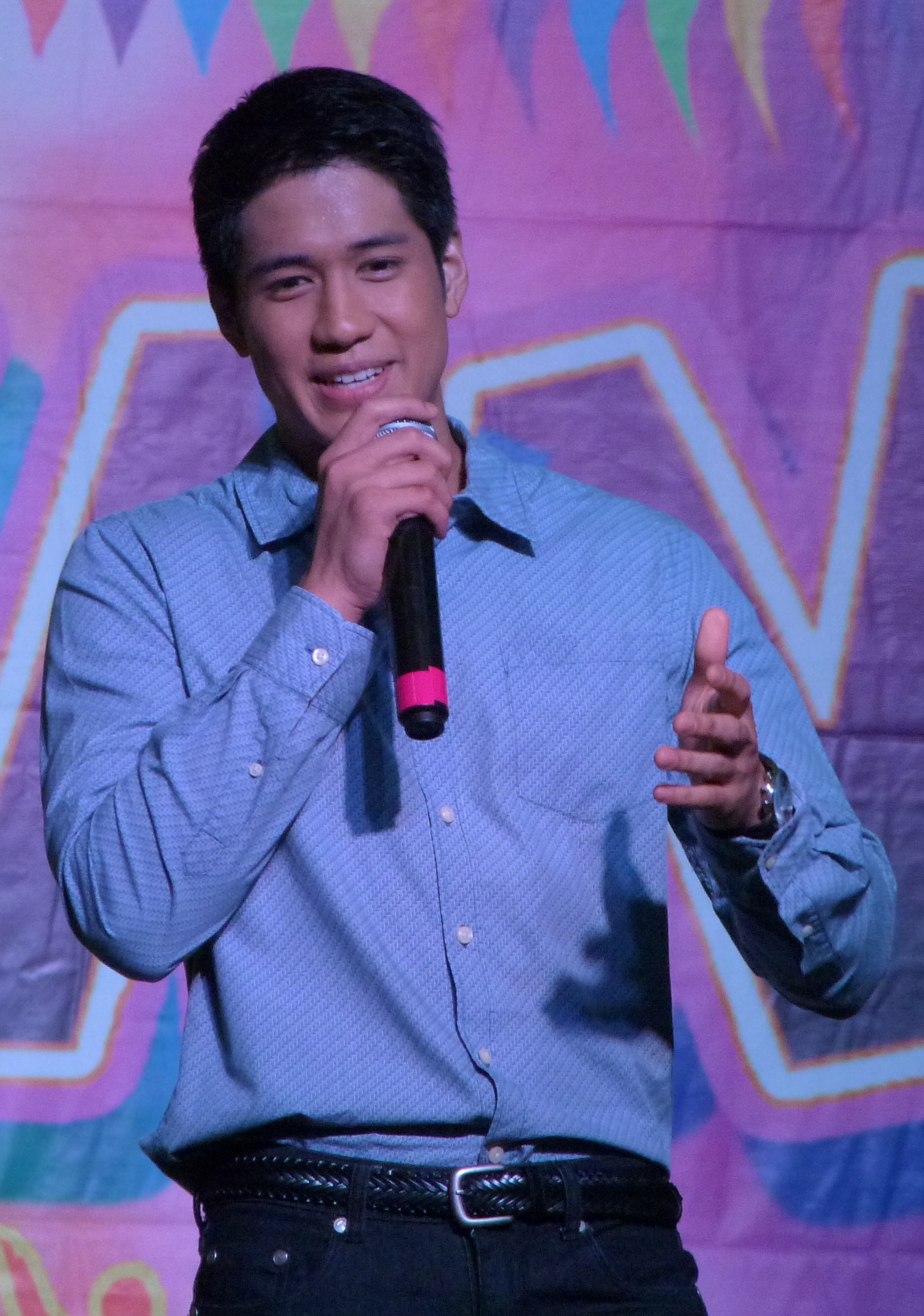
Aljur Abrenica

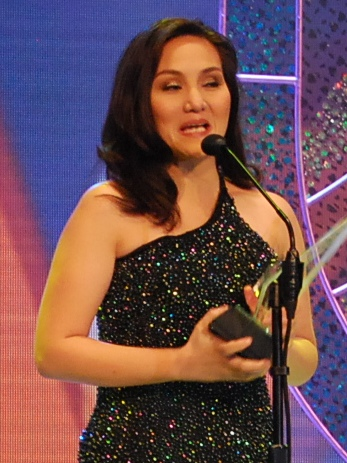
Gladys Reyes

Lead cast

- Louise delos Reyes as Alona Natividad-Ramos / Perlas "Pearl" Natividad-Villanueva

Supporting cast

- Aljur Abrenica as Kevin Villanueva
- Mike Tan as Jun Ramos
- Chanda Romero as Victorina Villanueva
- Nova Villa as Ligaya Natividad
- Tessie Tomas as Margarita "Rita" Natividad
- Mickey Ferriols as Marissa Natividad
- Lotlot de Leon as Susanna Villanueva
- Angelika Dela Cruz as Arowana
- Gladys Reyes as Barakuda
- Rich Asuncion as Betilya
- Polo Ravales as Ataba
- Wynwyn Marquez as Macy Montero
- Pancho Magno as Homer Villanueva

Guest cast

- Ryan Eigenmann as Enrique Villanueva
- Yul Servo as Damos
- Hershey Garcia as younger Perlas and younger Alona
- Archie Adamos as Ramon Ramos
- Juan Rodrigo as Manolo Montero
- Jaclyn Jose as Benita Samaniego
- Thea Tolentino as Gindara
- Andrea del Rosario as Desiree Antonio
- Miggs Cuaderno as younger Jun
- Francis Magundayao as younger Kevin
- Erika Padilla as Gigi
- Milkcah Wynne Nacion as Didang Ramos
- Betong Sumaya as voice of Barakuda's pet
- Tess Bomb as Chubita
- Marina Benipayo
- Arianne Bautista as Annie
- Arthur Solinap
- Bing Davao

== Ratings ==
According to AGB Nielsen Philippines' Mega Manila household television ratings, the pilot episode of Kambal Sirena earned a 23.6% rating. The final episode scored a 23.7 rating. The series had its highest rating on March 13, 2014 with a 25.1% rating.
