= Jeongbu (film) =

2025 Sinag Maynila entry

- Theatrical release poster
- Directed by: Topel Lee
- Screenplay by: Michael S. Bernaldez
- Produced by: Marko John Gutierrez
- Starring: Ritz Azul; Aljur Abrenica; Empress Schuck
- Cinematography: AB Garcia
- Edited by: Chrishel Desuasido
- Music by: Francis De Veyra
- Production companies: Gutierez Celebrities & Media Production
- Distributed by: G Camp
- Release date: September 24, 2025
- Country: Philippines
- Language: Filipino

Jeongbu (stylized as JEongbu) is a 2025 Philippine horror film screenplayed by Michael S. Bernaldez and directed by Topel Lee. It stars Ritz Azul, Aljur Abrenica and Empress Schuck. The film is about how the secrets and betrayal manifest as hauntings.

The film's title is a Korean word means The Mistress. The film bagged four awards in 7TH SINAG MAYNILA Awards including best director, best editing, best cinematography and best sound.

== Cast ==
- Aljur Abrenica as Ethan
- Ritz Azul as Ira
- Empress Schuck
- Rayantha Leigh as Fiona
- Mateo Sanjuan as Jerry

== Release ==
It was screened in various cinemas in the Philippines from September 24-30, 2025, as part of the Sinag Maynila film festival.

== Reception ==
=== Accolades ===
Accolades received by Jeongbu
| Award | Date of ceremony | Category | Recipient(s) | Result | Ref. |
|---|---|---|---|---|---|
| Sinag Maynila 2025 awards | September 28, 2025 | Best Director | Topel Lee | Won | |
| Sinag Maynila 2025 awards | September 28, 2025 | Best Cinematography | AB Garcia | Won | |
| Sinag Maynila 2025 awards | September 28, 2025 | Best Editing | Chrishel Desuasido | Won | |
| Sinag Maynila 2025 awards | September 28, 2025 | Best Sound | Nerika Salim & Immanuel Verona | Won | |
