= 2013 Cinemalaya =

9th Cinemalaya Independent Film Festival
- Official poster
- Opening film: Jazz in Love by Baby Ruth Villarama
- Closing film: Burgos by Joel Lamangan
- Location: Metro Manila, Philippines
- Film titles: 25
- Festival date: July 26, 2013–August 4, 2013
- Website: Official Website

Cinemalaya chronology
- 2014 2012

The 9th Cinemalaya Independent Film Festival was successfully held from July 26 to August 4, 2013, in Metro Manila, Philippines. This year's theme is "Synergy of the Senses", which makes the entries to deliver mature content and provocative themes. The opening film is Jazz in Love by Baby Ruth Villarama, a documentary about a Filipino gay man who waits for the arrival of his German boyfriend. The closing film is Joel Lamangan's Burgos which stars Lorna Tolentino as Edita Burgos, the crusading mother of missing activist Jonas. The winners were announced on August 4 at the Cultural Center of the Philippines, Jerrold Tarog's Sana Dati and Hannah Espia's Transit won top film honors in the awards night.

== Entries ==
The fifteen feature-film entries are divided into two separate competitions. The five feature-film entries will compete under the Directors Showcase which are presented by veteran film directors of the country. While the other ten feature-film entries will compete under the New Breed section which are presented by first-time or young filmmakers working today. The Short Film section has also ten competing entries. The winning film is highlighted with boldface and a dagger.

=== Directors Showcase ===
Title	Director	Cast	Genre
Amor y Muerte	Ces Evangelista	Markki Stroem, Adrian Sebastian, Althea Vega, Ama Quiambao	Period drama, Erotic
Ekstra	Jeffrey Jeturian	Vilma Santos, Marlon Rivera, Vincent de Jesus, Tart Carlos	Drama, Comedy
Porno	Adolfo Alix, Jr.	Angel Aquino, Carlo Aquino, Yul Servo, Rosanna Roces	Drama
**Sana Dati** ^{†}	Jerrold Tarog	Lovi Poe, Paulo Avelino, TJ Trinidad, Benjamin Alves	Romance
Liars	Gil Portes	Alessandra de Rossi, Jan Harley Hicana, John Michael Bonapos	Drama

=== New Breed ===
Title	Director	Cast	Genre
Babagwa	Jason Paul Laxamana	Alex Medina, Joey Paras, Kiko Matos, Alma Concepcion	Drama
Debosyon	Alvin Yapan	Paulo Avelino, Mara Lopez	Drama
The Diplomat Hotel	Christopher Ad Castillo	Gretchen Barretto, Art Acuña, Mon Confiado, Joel Torre, Sue Prado	Horror
Instant Mommy	Leo Abaya	Eugene Domingo, Yuki Matsuzaki	Romantic comedy
Nuwebe	Joseph Israel Laban	Barbara Miguel, Jake Cuenca, Nadine Samonte, Anita Linda	Drama
Purok 7	Carlo Obispo	Krystle Valentino, Miggs Cuaderno, Julian Trono, Arnold Reyes, Angeli Bayani	Drama
Quick Change	Eduardo Roy Jr.	Mimi Juareza, Junjun Quintana, Miggs Cuaderno, Natashia Yumi, Felipe Martinez	Drama
Rekorder	Mikhail Red	Ronnie Quizon, Suzette Ranillo, Belinda Mariano, Glenn Barit, Mandy Guballa, Paolo Bañaga, Easy Ferrer	Drama
**Transit** ^{†}	Hannah Espia	Ping Medina, Marc Alvarez, Irma Adlawan, Mercedes Cabral, Jasmine Curtis	Drama
David F.	Manny Palo	Quester Hannah, Sid Lucero, Art Acuña, Rocky Salumbides, Mitch Valdez, Shamaine Buencamino, Anita Linda	Drama

=== Short films ===
Title	Director
Bakaw	Ron Segismundo
**The Houseband's Wife** ^{†}	Paulo O'Hara
Katapusang Labok	Aiess Alonso
Missing	Zig Dulay
Onang	JE Tiglao
Para kay Ama	Relyn Tan
Pukpok	Joaquin Pantaleon
Sa Wakas	Ma. Veronica Santiago
Taya	Adi Bontuyan
Tutob	Kissza Campano

== Awards ==
Here is the list of winners in this year's Cinemalaya Independent Film Festival held Sunday night, August 4, at the Tanghalang Nicanor Abelardo (Main Theater) of the Cultural Center of the Philippines.

=== Full-Length Features ===
Directors Showcase

- Best Film - Sana Dati by Jerrold Tarog
  - Special Jury Prize - Ekstra by Jeffrey Jeturian
  - Audience Award - Ekstra by Jeffrey Jeturian
- Best Direction - Jerrold Tarog for Sana Dati
- Best Actor - (no awardee)
- Best Actress - Vilma Santos for Ekstra
- Best Supporting Actor - TJ Trinidad for Sana Dati
- Best Supporting Actress - Ruby Ruiz for Ekstra
- Best Screenplay - Zig Dulay, Antoinette Jadaone and Jeffrey Jeturian for Ekstra
- Best Cinematography - Mackie Galvez for Sana Dati
- Best Editing - Pats R. Ranyo for Sana Dati
- Best Sound - Roger TJ Ladro for Sana Dati
- Best Original Music Score - Jerrold Tarog for Sana Dati
- Best Production Design - Ericson Navarro for Sana Dati

New Breed

- Best Film - Transit by Hannah Espia
  - Special Jury Prize - Quick Change by Eduardo Roy Jr.
  - Audience Award - Transit by Hannah Espia
- Best Direction - Hannah Espia for Transit
- Best Actor - Mimi Juareza for Quick Change
- Best Actress - Irma Adlawan for Transit
- Best Supporting Actor - Joey Paras for Babagwa
- Best Supporting Actress - Jasmine Curtis for Transit
  - Special Jury Citation for Best Acting Ensemble - The cast of Transit (Irma Adlawan, Marc Alvarez, Mercedes Cabral, Jasmine Curtis, Ping Medina)
- Best Screenplay - Eduardo Roy Jr. for Quick Change
- Best Cinematography - Ber Cruz and Lyle Nemenzo Sacris for Transit
- Best Editing - Benjamin Tolentino and Hannah Espia for Transit
- Best Sound - Michael Idioma for Quick Change
- Best Original Music Score - Mon Espia for Transit
- Best Production Design - Roy Red for Rekorder

Special Awards

- NETPAC Award
  - Directors Showcase - Ekstra by Jeffrey Jeturian
  - New Breed - Transit by Hannah Espia

=== Short films ===
- Best Short Film - The Houseband's Wife by Paulo O'Hara
  - Special Jury Prize - Taya by Adi Bontuyan
  - Special Citation - Sa Wakas by Ma. Veronica Santiago
- Best Direction - Jann Eric Tiglao for Onang
- Best Screenplay - Paulo O'Hara for The Houseband's Wife
