= List of programs broadcast by PIE (TV channel) =

The following is a list of programs broadcast by PIE, a Philippine free-to-air television channel co-owned by Kroma Entertainment, ABS-CBN Corporation, and 917Ventures, in partnership with Broadcast Enterprises and Affiliated Media.

== Programming blocks ==
The programming was divided into various programming blocks:

=== Former ===
- PIE Silog – the channel's morning lifestyle and music block. It formerly aired from 5:00 a.m. to 11:30 a.m.
- Barangay PIE Silog – (a consolidation of Barangay PIE and PIE Silog) the channel's morning lifestyle and public service block. It formerly aired from 10:00 a.m. to 12:00 n.n.
- Barangay PIE – the channel's off-centered news and human interest block. It formerly aired from 11:30 a.m. to 3:00 p.m.
- PIE Borito – the channel's anthology, drama, romance, and music block. It formerly aired from 11:00 a.m. to 4:00 p.m.
- PIE Galingan – the channel's unique talent variety block. it formerly aired from 4:30 p.m. to 6:30 p.m. on weekdays and from 4:00 p.m. to 6:00 p.m. on Saturdays.
- PIEnalo (branded as PIEnalo: Pinoy Games from September 12, 2022, to January 21, 2023) – the channel's instant wins and recognition block. From January 2 to April 28, 2023, it formerly aired from 6:30 p.m. to 9:00 p.m. on weekdays. On weekends from January 28 to April 30, 2023, this block was branded as 'Sang Daang PIEnalo which aired from 6:00 p.m. to 7:30 p.m. on Saturdays, and from 6:15 p.m. to 9:00 p.m. on Sundays.
- PIE Night Long – the channel's talk, narrative, and music block. It formerly aired from 9:30 p.m. to 12:00 m.n.

== Final programming ==
- Dragons: The Nine Realms (2023)
- Forevermore (2014–2015, rerun, 2023)
- Kadenang Ginto (2018–2020, rerun, 2023)
- Mga Kuwento Ng Dilim (rerun, 2023)
- Kung Saka-Sakali (rerun, 2023)
- Para Sa All (rerun, 2023)
- TCO: Katatacute (rerun, 2023)
- Mukhang Perya (2023)
- Playlist (2022)
- Sino'ng Manok Mo? (2022)
  - Barangay Edition
- Ur Da Boss (2023)
- Tamang Hinala (2023)
- Watchawin (2023)

== Former programs ==
=== Block-exclusive ===
==== PIE Silog ====
- Almusal All G
- G Tayo
- Gscovery
- Stalk

==== Barangay PIE Silog ====
- Dr. Care
- Eto Na Nga
- Life Guro
- Pasok Mga Suki
- Sumpungan HQ

==== Barangay PIE ====
- Barangay PIE Clearance
- Barangayan
- Lokal
- Oohlascope
- Oohlat
- Oohlat Weather
- Sumpungan
- Team Slapsoil
  - Slapsoil D.I.Y.
  - Slapsoil Kusina
  - Slaptrip
- Umpukan
- Wanted Tanod
- Balita Now

==== PIE Borito ====
- Best of Barangay PIE
- Dream Maker Catch-up
- PIE Extra Slice
- Uzi Presents: Iba
- On the Wings of Love (2015–2016, re-run, 2022–2023)
- Playlist Natin

==== PIE Galingan ====
- BB Gurlz: The Search for the PIEbansang Girl Group
- Best of Ekstra Ordinaryo
- Bida Body Part
- Ekstra Ordinaryo
  - Ekstra Ordinaryo: Next Level
- Galing Reveal
- Nu Ginagawa Mo?
- PIE Exam
- PIE Game
- Papa ng Masa

==== PIEnalo/PIEnalo: Pinoy Games/'Sang Daang PIEnalo ====
- Ambagan
- Dagdag Bawas
- Matching Matching (2022)
  - Matching Matching: Limited Edition
- Palong Follow
- Pera o Bayong (PoB)
  - PoB Jackpot
  - PoB: Sana All
  - Pasa o Bayong
- Swerteng Sulpot

==== PIE Night Long ====
- Basta Ka-Feeling Ka
- How To Be U?
- Moments
  - Connecting Moments
  - Hu-Quote Of The Night
  - Moment Mo
  - PIE Night Out
  - Tender, Love & Karen
- PNL Sessions
- Uzi
  - Uzi Moments
  - Uzi News
  - Uzi Report

=== Non-block exclusive ===
- Abominable and the Invisible City (2023)
- Dream Maker
  - Dream Maker: Pause & Play (2023)
- Got to Believe (2013–2014, rerun, 2023)
- Kung Saka-sakali (2023)
- Mga Kuwento ng Dilim (2023)
- Pak! Palong Follow (2022–2023)
- Pak na Pak! Palong Follow (2023)
- Pak na Pak! (2023)
- Para sa All (2023)
- Pera o Bayong (PoB)
  - PoB Bonus (2022)
  - PoB Pambato (2022)
- The Better Half (2017, rerun, 2023)
- The Chosen One Catch-up (2022–2023)
- The Chosen One
  - Soap Opera (2022)
  - The Chosen One: Barkadahan (2023)
  - Kakata-cute (2023)
  - Chugi Night (2023)
- The Croods: Family Tree (2023)
- The SPG Show: Saktong Pang Gabi (2023)
- PIE Shorts (2023)
  - Eat Pay Love
  - Cool Off
  - Tropa Trobol
- Shoutout TV (2023)
  - Shoutout TV Weekend
- Swerteng Sulpot Jr.
