= Babagwa =

- Directed by: Jason Paul Laxamana
- Written by: Jason Paul Laxamana
- Produced by: Ferdinand Lapuz
- Starring: Alex Medina; Joey Paras; Alma Concepcion
- Cinematography: Topel Lee
- Edited by: Carlo Fransisco Manatad
- Music by: Lucien Letaba; Joseph Lansang
- Production companies: Cinemalaya; Quantum Films; Kamaru Productions
- Release dates: July 27, 2013 (Cinemalaya); September 18, 2013 (Philippines)
- Running time: 101 minutes
- Country: Philippines
- Languages: Filipino; English; Kapampangan
- Box office: P 188,006.55

Babagwa (English: The Spider's Lair) is a 2013 Filipino drama film written and directed by Jason Paul Laxamana. The film stars Alex Medina as Greg, an internet scammer who falls in love with a wealthy old maid while trying to swindle her using a fake Facebook profile. The film competed under the New Breed section of the 9th Cinemalaya Independent Film Festival. It went on to be screened in film festivals in Hawaii, Cleveland, Vancouver, and Warsaw.

== Synopsis ==
Greg (Alex Medina) uses a fake Facebook account to trick people into depositing money into his bank account. Assuming the persona of a fictional guy named Bam (Kiko Matos), he flirts with a filthy rich woman that he met online. But in time, he falls in love with Daisy (Alma Concepcion) and is confused whether he will push through with the scam or admit his feelings for Daisy.

== Cast ==
- Alex Medina as Greg
- Joey Paras as Marney
- Alma Concepcion as Daisy
- Kiko Matos as Bam
- Nico Antonio as Peewee
- Vicky Vega as Marney's Mother
- Chanel Latorre

== Awards ==
- 9th Cinemalaya Independent Film Festival (New Breed)
  - Best Supporting Actor – Joey Paras
