= Greggy Liwag =

Filipino actor

Greggy Liwag is a former Filipino actor. In 1984 he married Rosita Capuyon, Miss Philippines, 1983. They have three children, Nicole, John and Christopher. Since 1989, Liwag and his family reside in the United States.

== Life and career ==
He appeared in movies such as Stepsisters (1979) with Lorna Tolentino, Tambay Sa Disco (1980) with Alma Moreno, High School Scandal (1981) with Gina Alajar, Palengke Queen (1982) with Nora Aunor, and Puppy Love (1982) with Janice de Belen. He did bold films such as Bomba Queen (1985) with Sarsi Emmanuelle, Paano Ang Aking Gabi? (1985) with Lala Montelibano, and Desperada (1986) with Vida Verde, among others.

He was formerly linked to actress Pia Moran.

== Filmography ==
Year	Title
1979	Stepsisters
1980	Tambay Sa Disco
1980	Uhaw Sa Kalayaaan
1981	Boystown
1981	High School Scandal
1982	Boy Condenado
1982	Palengke Queen
1982	Puppy Love
1982	Isla Sto. Nino
1983	Alex San Diego: Wanted
1983	Angkinin Mo Ako
1983	Hanguin Mo Ako Sa Putik
1984	Sex Education
1984	Hanggang Sa Huling Bala
1984	Malisya
1985	Bomba Queen
1985	Paano Ang Aking Gabi?
1985	Partida
1985	God Save Me!
1986	Alindog
1986	Halik Sa Pisngi Ng Langit
1986	Hiram Na Katawan
1986	Desperada
1986	Stop: Abortion
1987	Amanda
1988	Rock A Bye Baby
1988	Gatas
1990	Sgt. Gabo Boga
1999	Kalaro
