= Ping Medina =

Filipino film actor

- Born: Crispin Chupungco Medina Jr. July 23, 1983 (age 42); Pasig, Metro Manila, Philippines
- Occupation: Actor
- Years active: 1998–present
- Agent: Star Magic (2007–present)
- Height: 5 ft 9 in (1.75 m)
- Parents: Pen Medina (father); Victoria Aquino Chupungco (mother)
- Relatives: Alex Medina (brother)

Crispin "Ping" Chupungco Medina Jr. (born July 23, 1983) is a Filipino film actor. Medina is a contract artist of Star Magic.

== Career ==
Medina is a prominent independent film actor in the Philippines. He debuted in Marilou Diaz-Abaya's film Jose Rizal with his father, Pen Medina playing as the young Paciano Rizal.

In 2012, Medina was chosen as the host of CNN's travel show CNNGo along with his co-host Nikki Gil.

In late November 2016, Medina became involved in an altercation with fellow actor Baron Geisler. Medina released a lengthy Facebook post with a photo of himself, sitting on a wheelchair and his middle finger aloft using his broken hand wrapped in bandages as a gesture of contempt against Geisler in the wake of the incident. According to his post, Geisler urinated on him during a shoot of an independent film in Subic wherein Medina's hands and feet were tied and his mouth was taped in a certain scene. Geisler issued an apology about the incident later on, admitting that he had been drinking and was heavily medicated with anti-depressants while filming. The same day, the film's director, Arlyn Dela Cruz, confirmed on her Facebook account that Geisler's role had been "written out" for the incident; she disclosed that some actors initially advised her not to work with Geisler, due to his "unruly behavior". In December 2016, Dela Cruz also confirmed that she would be replacing Medina with an unnamed actor in hopes that she could bring back the "happy atmosphere" on the set of her film. In 2020, Geisler stated in a Twitter response that Medina raped a former girlfriend of his citing it as the reason he urinated on him after rape allegations against Medina surfaced from a certain Twitter user in the same year. Geisler had previously accused Medina with the same allegations back in 2016 after the incident between them. Medina since has not provided concrete response to Geisler's accusations.

== Filmography ==
=== Film ===
==== As actor ====
Year	Title	Role
1998	Jose Rizal	Young Paciano
1998	Puso ng Pasko	Caloy
2003	Bertud ng Putik	Young Totong
2005	The Blossoming of Maximo Oliveros	Bogs Oliveros
2005	Anak ng Tinapa	
2005	Trabaho	
2006	Tulad ng Dati	Teddy Diaz
2006	Imahe Nasyon	
2006	Numbalikdiwa	Anton
2007	Super Noypi	
2007	Three Boys	Bam
2007	Tukso	
2008	Selda	
2009	Iliw	Pablo
2009	Kinatay	Bong
2010	Noy	Binatang Bangkero
2010	Mayohan	Ruben
2011	Manila Kingpin: The Asiong Salonga Story	Piring
2013	Transit	Moises
2013	10,000 Hours	Young Jago
2014	Tres	Esteban
2014	Maratabat: Pride and Honor	Ronwaldo Mahardika
2014	Bonifacio: Ang Unang Pangulo	Ladislao Diwa
2015	The Cannibal in the Jungle	Reg Seputra
2015	Dahling Nick	
2015	Mandirigma	
2016	Dukot	Alex
2019	Bato: The General Ronald dela Rosa Story	NPA informer
2019	3pol Trobol: Huli Ka Balbon!	Joaquin
2022	The Buy Bust Queen	Zandro Lopez
2023	Layas	
2023	Pinoy Ghost Tales	Boss Alex

==== As screenwriter only ====
Year	Title	Ref(s).
2023	Kabayo	
2024	The Virgin Sisters	

=== Television/digital series ===
Year	Title	Role	Notes	Source
2005	Mga Anghel Na Walang Langit	Elmo		
2005	Etheria: Ang Ikalimang Kaharian ng Encantadia	Young Hagorn	Supporting cast / antagonist	
2006	Makita Ka Lang Muli			
2007	Prinsesa ng Banyera	Armand Arellano		
2008	Palos			
2009	Tayong Dalawa	Nicolas "Nico" Valencia	Extended cast / antagonist	
2009–2010	Pepeng Agimat	Lucio Hizon		
2010	Mara Clara	Karlo David	Supporting cast / anti-hero / protagonist	
2011	Green Rose	Ariel Fernandez		
2011	Anino't Panaginip: The Hidden Chapters of Imortal			
2012	One True Love	Jun Manabat		
2013	Indio	Diego De Dios		
2013	Bayan Ko	Congressman Anton Rubio	Supporting cast / antagonist / anti-hero	
2013	Got to Believe	Asiong		
2013	Be Careful with My Heart	Young Arturo	Special participation	
2014	Elemento	Max	Episode: "Musika ng Bulag Na Pag-Ibig"	
2015	Wish Ko Lang!			
2015	Wagas	Rey	Episode: "Musika ng Bulag Na Pag-Ibig"	
2015	Ipaglaban Mo!	Rango	Episode: "Sigaw ng Katarungan"	
2015–2016	FPJ's Ang Probinsyano	Diego Sahagun	Supporting cast / antagonist / anti-hero	
2016	My Super D	Mario	Supporting cast / antagonist / anti-hero	
2016	Ipaglaban Mo!	Jopet	Episode: "Haligi"	
2017	Ipaglaban Mo!	Bong	Episode: "Hulidap"	
2018	Ipaglaban Mo!	Mando	Episode: "Uliran"	
2018	Precious Hearts Romances Presents: Araw Gabi	Gardo Leoncio	Guest cast / antagonist / anti-hero	
2018	Kambal, Karibal	Obet		
2019	Ipaglaban Mo: Damay	Briggs Dela Cruz	Guest cast / antagonist	
2019	Kadenang Ginto	Badong	Guest cast / antagonist	
2019	Beautiful Justice	Jiggs		
2021	Ang Dalawang Ikaw	Nicco		
2023	Dirty Linen	Hector Tantoco	Supporting cast / antagonist	
2023 - 2025	FPJ's Batang Quiapo	Edwin Dimaculangan	Supporting cast / antagonist	
