= Glydel Mercado =

Filipino singer and actress (born 1975)

- Born: Flordeliza Sanchez; March 10, 1975 (age 51); Dumaguete, Philippines
- Occupations: Singer; actress
- Height: 1.63 m (5 ft 4 in)
- Spouse: Tonton Gutierrez (m. 2004)
- Children: 2

Flordeliza Sanchez-Gutierrez (born March 10, 1975), known professionally as Glydel Mercado, is a Filipino singer and actress. She began her career in the late 1980s through the variety show That's Entertainment and has since played supporting roles in numerous film and television productions. She is one of the few performers to win the Grand Slam for Best Supporting Actress, having won all four major Philippine film awards for her performance in the romantic drama Sidhi (1999).

Her film Anak Ng Yakuza was shown months before its premiere in Japan for a theatrical film exhibit. Sidhi was also a widely acclaimed release in theatres and home video and Azucena was a critical acclaim for her performance opposite Alessandra De Rossi, Dante Rivero, and Ricky Davao. In the early 2000s she also starred as Amalia a Antagonist on the hit Primetime Soap Sa Dulo Ng Walang Hanggan, and Darating Ang Umaga in 2003. As one of the main supporting characters.

== Career ==
She appeared in movies such as Alyas Baby Chino (1989), Teenage Mama (1993), Bikini Watch (1995), Anak ng Yakuza (1997) and Ambisyosa (1997) with Tonton Gutierrez, Emilio Garcia, Rita Magdalena, Roy Rodrigo and Ronaldo Valdez. She would do more acclaimed films such as Sidhi with Nora Aunor and Albert Martinez (1998) and Azucena with Alessandra De Rossi in 2000 Sana Totoo Na in 2002.

In 2008, she played as Marlina in drama film Lukaret, a story of a woman whose struggle to keep her sanity becomes complicated when she gets obsessed with a young man's affection that results in a series of gruesome murders.

She was included in the cast in GMA Network's Babangon Ako't Dudurugin Kita (2008) with Dina Bonnevie and Gagambino (2008) with Dennis Trillo. She was also in TV5's Isang Dakot na Luha (2012) starring Danita Paner, Jay Manalo and Alice Dixson.

In 2012, Mercado officially signed an exclusive television contract with GMA Network.

After seven years on GMA Network, she returned to ABS-CBN to play an antagonist role in Kadenang Ginto.

In 2021, after finishing Bagong Umaga on ABS-CBN, she returned to GMA-7 in the teleserye The World Between Us as a guest cast.

== Personal life ==
She married actor Tonton Gutierrez on March 15, 2004, at the Sanctuario de San Antonio Parish, Forbes Park, Makati. They have two daughters, Aneeza (born 2004) and Aneeka (born 2011).

== Filmography ==
=== Film ===
Year	Title	Role	Notes	Source
1993	Teenage Mama			
1993	Lt. Madarang: Inginuit sa Dugo	Karina	Credited as "Flordeliza Sanchez"	
1995	P're Hanggang sa Huli	Lady in the grocery		
1995	Silakbo	Chiqui		
1995	Onyok Tigasin	Irma		
1995	Indecent Professor	Professor Liberata		
1995	Dodong Scarface	Lisa		
1995	Bikini Watch	Carol		
1995	Batangueno Kabitenyo			
1995	Ang Tipo Kong Lalake (Maginoo Pero Medyo...)	Dormitory Boarders		
1996	Dyesebel	Sirena 1		
1996	Cara y Cruz: Walang Sinasanto	Berting's girl		
1996	Totoy Golem			
1996	Pipti-pipti (1 por U, 2 por Me)	Cristina		
1996	Mano Mano			
1996	Mahal Kita, Ano Mo Ba?	Vicky		
1996	April Boys: Sana'y Mahalin Mo Rin Ako	Tuesday		
1996	Ang Misis Kong Hoodlum	Apple		
1997	SIG .357: Baril Mo ang Papatay sa Iyo	Michelle		
1997	Papunta Ka Pa Lang, Pabalik Na Ako			
1997	Nakawin Mo ang Aking Puso			
1997	Mortal Kong Kaaway, Kaibigan Kong Tunay			
1997	I Do? I Die! (D'yos Ko Day!)	Carrie		
1997	Dimas at Magdalena	Magdalena		
1997	Bawal sa Halik			
1997	Baril sa Baril			
1997	Anak ng Yakuza	Cherry		
1997	Ambisyosa	Irma		
1997	Alyas Baby Chino			
1998	Takaw Tukso			
1998	Kid Manalo, Akin ang Ulo Mo	Lara		
1999	Sidhi	Mayang		
1999	Misteryosa	Minda		
1999	Mister Mo, Lover Ko	Maita Quintos		
2000	Azucena	Sonia		
2000	Umaga, Tanghali, Gabi		Television film	
2000	Sgt. Isaias Marcos... Bawal Hakbang Panganib			
2000	Ping Lacson: Super Cop	Rowena		
2001	Talamak	Cristy		
2001	ID	Stella dela Cruz		
2002	Sana Totoo Na	Leah		
2006	The Mourning Girls	Lupita		
2006	Rome & Juliet	Ate Lia		
2008	Lukaret			
2009	Sundo	Lumen		
2009	Dalaw	Cleo		
2014	Overtime			
2015	Felix Manalo	Dominador's wife		
2017	Northern Lights: A Journey to Love	Leah		
2018	Kasunduan	Old Gia		
2018	Jack Em Popoy: The Puliscredibles	Rowena Delos Reyes		
2019	Banal	Erika's mother		
2023	That Boy in the Dark			
2023	Fall Guy	Beth		

=== Television ===
Year	Title	Role	Notes	Source
1986–1996	That's Entertainment	Herself, Co-Host / Performer	Friday Group Member	
1996–1997	Mara Clara	Inggrid		
1996–1999	Super Laff-In	Herself – Co-Host		
1997	Maalaala Mo Kaya		Episode: "Kalawang"	
1997	Wansapanataym	Twinkle		
1997–2002	!Oka Tokat	Verna Vidal	Episode: Engkantao	
1997–1999	Del Tierro	Guada		
1999–2000	Liwanag ng Hatinggabi	Adela		
2000	Maalaala Mo Kaya		Episode: "Mansanas"	
2000	Munting Anghel	Monica		
2001	Maalaala Mo Kaya		Episode: "Jigsaw Puzzle"	
2001	Maalaala Mo Kaya		Episode: "Manika, at Kotse-kotsehan"	
2002	Sa Dulo ng Walang Hanggan	Amelia Fuentes	Supporting Cast	
2002	Maalaala Mo Kaya		Episode: "Dahon, at Langis"	
2002–2003	Lunch Break	Host		
2003	Maalaala Mo Kaya		Episode: "Upuan"	
2003	Darating ang Umaga	Gertrudis "Trudis" Del Fiego		
2005–2006	Daisy Siete	Sofia Midel	Episode: "Ang Pitong Maria"	
2005	Magpakailanman	Pia Calayan	Episode: "The Manny & Pie Calayan Story"	
2005–2006	Etheria: Ang Ikalimang Kaharian ng Encantadia	Ornia		
2006	Now and Forever: Duyan	Loren		
2006–2007	Komiks Presents: Da Adventures of Pedro Penduko	Mambabarang		
2007	Sana Maulit Muli	Clara Espino-Soriano		
2007	Sine Novela: Kung Mahawi Man ang Ulap	Minda Clemente-Acuesta		
2007–2008	Carlo J. Caparas' Kamandag	Vivian		
2008	Babangon Ako't Dudurugin Kita	Imelda / Verna Hornales		
2008–2009	Carlo J. Caparas' Gagambino	Rebecca Bayani-Santiago		
2009	Ang Babaeng Hinugot sa Aking Tadyang	Celina Valdez		
2009	Rosalinda	Soledad Romero / Martha		
2010	Sine Novela: Gumapang Ka Sa Lusak	Anita Ramiro		
2010	Elena M. Patron's Momay	Hillary Buenavidez-Alonzo		
2010–2011	Sabel	Choleng Asuncion		
2011	Wansapanataym	Linda	Episode: "Inay Ko Po"	
2011–2012	My Binondo Girl	Luningning "Ningning" Wu		
2012	The Good Daughter	Tina Atilano-Guevarra		
2012	Isang Dakot na Luha	Veronica Vergara-San Diego		
2012	Hindi Ka na Mag-iisa	Maita Montenegro		
2012	Magpakailanman	Gloria	Episode: "The Power of Love"	
2013	Unforgettable	Elvira Caruhatan		
2013	My Husband's Lover	Sandra Agatep		
2013	Magpakailanman	Racquel Pempengco	Episode: "Coming Out"	
2013	Magpakailanman	Lulu	Episode: "Peligro sa Sariling Bahay"	
2014	Rhodora X	Lourdes Sales-Ferrer		
2014	Magpakailanman	Marta	Episode: "Barangay Cybersex"	
2014	Magpakailanman	Michelle	Episode: "Retokadang Ina"	
2014	Magpakailanman	Hazel	Episode: "Ang Lihim ng Aking Ama"	
2014–2015	Ang Lihim ni Annasandra	Belinda "Linda" Santos-Vergara		
2015	The Rich Man's Daughter	Amanda Dionisio-Tanchingco		
2015	Magpakailanman	Imelda	Episode: "Anak, Kapatid, Ina"	
2015	Magpakailanman	Mylene	Episode: "Don't Chat with Strangers"	
2016	Wish I May	Barbara Pizarro		
2016	Magpakailanman	Imelda	Episode: "Sa Kabila ng Lahat, Ikaw Pa Rin"	
2016	Sinungaling Mong Puso	Raquel Labangon-Aguirre		
2016	Magpakailanman	Lorelei	Episode: "Ang Hinagpis ng Isang Ina"	
2017	My Love from the Star	Lynelle Chavez		
2017	Magpakailanman	Alicia	Episode: "God, Save My Daughter"	
2017	Dear Uge	Acy	Episode: "For a Change"	
2017	Daig Kayo Ng Lola Ko	Golda's Mother	Episode: "Golda, and the Three Pandas"	
2018	The Stepdaughters	Luisa "Loreng" Manor		
2018	Tadhana	Lucia	Episode: "Lihim, at liham"	
2018	Daddy's Gurl	Fely	Episode: "Forgetful is Fely"	
2019	Magpakailanman	Cynthia Villar	Episode: "Tatlong Henerasyon ng Sipag at Tiyaga"	
2019	Kara Mia	Julia Vergara		
2019	Kadenang Ginto	Rosita	Guest Cast	
2020	Magpakailanman	Beth	Episode: "A Mother's Faith"	
2020	Eat Bulaga!	Herself	Bawal Judgmental! segment	
2020–2021	Bagong Umaga	Diana Silang-Jacinta		
2020	Tadhana	Leila	Episode: "Laman"	
2021	The World Between Us	Clara Asuncion		
2022	Artikulo 247	Rose Ortega		
2023	Magpakailanman	Erlin	Episode: "Sana'y Muling Makapiling"	
2024–2025	Shining Inheritance	Leilani "Lani" Vegara-Villarazon		
2025	Sanggang-Dikit FR	Dina Manalo		

== Awards and nominations ==
Year	Work	Award	Category	Result	Source
1999	—N/a	Special Award	Female Star of the Night	Won	
2000	Sidhi	PMPC Star Awards for Movies	Best Supporting Actress	Won	
2000	Sidhi	Gawad Urian Award	Best Supporting Actress	Won	
2000	Sidhi	FAP Award	Best Supporting Actress	Won	
2000	Sidhi	FAMAS Award	Best Supporting Actress	Won	
2014	My Husband's Lover	Golden Screen TV Award	Best Supporting Actress	Won	

== Discography ==
=== Albums ===
Year	Album	Label
1995	Glydel Mercado	Alpha Records
