= Glamorosa =

- Genre: Melodrama; Revenge; Romance
- Created by: Associated Broadcasting Company
- Written by: Adrian Ho; Alejandro Ramos
- Directed by: Eric Quizon; Joyce Bernal; Argel Joseph; Jon Red
- Starring: Lorna Tolentino; Alice Dixson; Zoren Legaspi; Tonton Gutierrez; Victor Silayan; Martin Escudero and introducing Ritz Azul
- Theme music composer: Jimmy Borja
- Opening theme: "Bukas Na Lang Kita Mamahalin" by Faith Cuneta
- Country of origin: Philippines
- Original languages: Filipino; English
- No. of episodes: 70

Production
- Executive producer: Shirley J. Fabella
- Producer: Maureen Y. Herrera
- Running time: 30-45 minutes

Original release
- Network: TV5
- Release: November 7, 2011 – February 10, 2012

Glamorosa is a Philippine television drama series broadcast by TV5. Directed by Eric Quizon, Joyce Bernal, Argel Joseph and Jon Red, it stars Lorna Tolentino, Alice Dixson, Zoren Legaspi, Tonton Gutierrez, Victor Silayan, Martin Escudero and Ritz Azul. It aired from November 7, 2011 to February 10, 2012, replacing Sa Ngalan ng Ina and was replaced by Valiente.

The series is all about the complex world of cosmetic surgery, and the lifestyles of two cosmetic surgeons who compete against one another for love and success in their field.

It is also the 2nd Primetime Anniversary Offering of TV5.

The Primetime Series has also been part of the Top 10 Primetime Programs in the NUTAM Ratings.

== Synopsis ==
Vengeance puzzled life of Paulina after what happened to her family. Her father was brutally killed on that day which turned her mother to be mentally distraught. She planned a revenge plot on Dra. Claudia Herrera, the main root of her miserable life and the root of her rivalry with Natalia.

Natalia, Claudia's daughter, was trapped by a perfectionist mother. Her mother never felt that she'd live up to her expectations and pressured her every time. One day, she met Karl in an incident that started her love for Karl.

Meanwhile, Paulina started her revenge. She asked Karl to seduce Natalia. After a long court and the pressure, Natalia was experiencing from her mother, she decided to live with Karl and make their family. Unfortunately, Karl had fallen in love with Natalia. Paulina used Claudia to bring back Karl to her and the same with Claudia.

When Natalia was set to labor, she suffered a car accident with Karl. Claudia kept the newborn baby to Oscar, her driver, and bodyguard, while Karl suffered amnesia. Paulina used this incident to take away her love for Karl from Natalia. She also used that incident to blackmail Claudia to support Karl's hospital needs which made Claudia give her millions.

Paulina used the money to go abroad and start her business along with Karl and the baby that was given by Oscar. She didn't know that it wasn't Karl and Natalia's daughter because Oscar gave his own daughter for the hospital's needs it was needed to support its life.

Because of what had happened, Natalia chose to study abroad and erase all the things from her past, including her heartbreak and the death of her child.

== Production ==
=== Casting ===
The series brings back two Philippine actresses, Lorna Tolentino and Alice Dixson. Both have worked in the 1988 film, Nagbabagang Luha directed by Ishmael Bernal.

Lorna Tolentino was last seen in the Television Series of ABS-CBN, Minsan Lang Kita Iibigin. In this series, she will be working with her fellow co-actors from that series, Tonton Gutierrez and Ronaldo Valdez. This marks her first Primetime Soap for TV5 and her 2nd time to work with Alice Dixson after the previous television series in 2004, Hanggang Kailan aired on GMA Network.

The primetime series is also the 2nd-anniversary initial offering, of the network to its viewers. It also brings the network's homegrown talent, Ritz Azul, after her first primetime series, Mga Nagbabagang Bulaklak.

The series also brings Gloria Diaz, and Lotlot de Leon with Celeste Legaspi. The series started production on October 4, 2011.

== Cast and characters ==
=== Main cast ===
- Giselle (Evangelista) Herrera Marciano (Ritz Azul) - A young girl in search of her true identity. She remains hopeful despite the constant jeers she receives from everyone because of the ugly scar on her face. She is the lost daughter of Natalia and Karl but will grow up as a daughter of Oscar and Miranda. All of her trials and difficulties given by her ugly face will be wipen off by the surgery made by Paulina, not knowing that all of these are trap. In the end she will know all the truth about her identity and will switch life and fate to Adriana who will experience all of sufferings made by an ugly face.

=== Supporting cast ===
- Dra. Natalia Herrera-(Lustico) Marciano (Lorna Tolentino) - A wealthy and successful cosmetic surgeon with a heart hardened by betrayal and tragedy brought about by the loss of her child and the man she loves. She is the daughter of Claudia Herrera (Gloria Diaz), a well-known name in the world of beauty industry, particularly to cosmetic surgery. Later she will know that Paulina, her mortal enemy is her half-sister.
- Dra. Paulina Valdez-Marciano (Alice Dixson) - An up-and-coming cosmetic surgeon and the rival to Natalia. Her dark past done by Manolo and Claudia pursued her dream of vengeance that caused her rival in love, power and beauty to Natalia. Vengeance lead her to do everything to be more powerful and glamorous than her rival. In the end she will be left dying of knowing the truth that her real father which is the main cause of her revenge is no other than Manolo.
- Dra. Claudia Montesilva-Herrera (Gloria Diaz) - A perfectionist and unloving mother of Natalia. She is considered as the country's pioneer in the beauty industry. Always the perfectionist, she never felt that Natalia would live up to her expectations, so this gives rise to constant tension between mother and daughter. She had a dark past with her husband Manolo, the reason why she don't love her daughter. She and Manolo killed Roger Valdez, titular father of Paulina and it is because of an incident that happened on their mansion. She kept Natalia's child to her bodyguard, Oscar to protect the name she had when Natalia accidentally laboured the child on a car accident.
- Tatiana Herrera (Celeste Legaspi) - A gold digger spinster and sister of Manolo Herrera. She went to New York to have there her love life and her career as a singer. She returned to the Herrera's mansion when she felt that she is running out of money. She is Claudia's major rival to the wealth of the Herrera's.
- Don Manolo Herrera / Lolo Rambo (Ronaldo Valdez) - A mysterious old man in the Home for the Aged. He is Claudia's lost husband who hides his identity brought by the things from his past.
- Karl Marciano (Zoren Legaspi) - A street-smart hoodlum and the man that captured the hearts of Natalia and Paulina.
- Giorgio Lustico (Tonton Gutierrez) - Natalia's husband. He is a good family friend of the Herrera's before he marry Natalia.
- Oscar Evangelista (Nonie Buencamino) - Claudia's bodyguard/driver to whom she had given Natalia's daughter, Giselle. He was a good adoptive father to Giselle.
- Miranda Evangelista (Lotlot de Leon) - Oscar's wife and a violent adoptive mother of Giselle.
- Calvin Lustico (Martin Escudero) - Grew up in the slums with Karl and due to an incident he was later adopted by Giorgio.
- Stefano Lustico (Victor Silayan) - Giorgio's bratty son from his first wife. He is Adriana's boyfriend but he felt in love to Giselle when Giselle is already glamorous.
- Adriana (Marciano)/Evangelista (Meg Imperial) - Oscar and Miranda's biological daughter but due to an incident she grew as Paulina and Karl's daughter. She will make Giselle's life miserable.
- Cristy (Jenny Miller) - A loyal friend and assistant of Natalia.
- Britney (Rubi Rubi) - Paulina's assistant and ally in revenge to Natalia.

=== Guest cast ===
- Precious Lara Quigaman as herself - A model / endorser of Claudia Herrera's Beauty Clinic.
- John Regala as Paco - Leader of the syndicate in which Karl is a member.
- Deborah Sun as Vivian Valdez - Paulina's mentally ill mother.
- Pen Medina as Roger Valdez - Father of Paulina.
- Gelli de Belen as Caroline - Natalia's client.
- Jay Manalo as Dr. Arman Gallano - A U.S.-based celebrity plastic surgeon.
- Wendy Valdez as Frederique - A client of Paulina.
- Joko Diaz as Hernandez - Giorgio's spy to Karl and Natalia.
- Ruffa Gutierrez as Ms. Naomi Malandrino - A 30-year-old flight attendant.
- Danita Paner as herself - A celebrity talk show host.
- Raquel Villavicencio as Mrs. Malandrino - Naomi's mother.
- Wendell Ramos as Nico Rodrigo - Naomi's love affair and a pilot in an airline in which Naomi is working with.
- Jasmine Curtis-Smith as Danica - Calvin's long-lost girlfriend.
- Anita Linda as Lola Magda - Danica's grandmother stayed in the home for the aged with Giselle.

=== Cameo appearance ===
- Ahron Villena as young Manolo Herrera
- Karel Marquez as young Claudia Montesilva
- John Manalo as Young Stefano
- Angeli Nicole Sanoy as young Giselle
- Jana Agoncillo as toddler Giselle
- Ayla Mendero as Young Paulina Valdez-Marciano

== Theme song ==
The official theme song of Glamorosa is Bukas Na Lang Kita Mamahalin performed by Faith Cuneta. Lyrics were from Jimmy Borja and originally performed by Lani Misalucha which was rearranged by PolyEast Records and was published by House of Tunes Music Publishing. The song was later covered by Jed Madela as the theme song of the drama of the same title in ABS-CBN starring Gerald Anderson, Cristine Reyes and Rayver Cruz.

== Trivia ==
- The series gained positive reviews from critics after its press conference held on November 4, 2011.
- It replaces the TV5 Mini-Serye slot of the Mini TV Serial Sa Ngalan ng Ina.
- Lorna Tolentino, Tonton Gutierrez, and Ronaldo Valdez worked together on ABS-CBN's Primetime Drama Series Minsan Lang Kita Iibigin.
- The theme song's title is the same as that of a 2013 primetime drama starring Gerald Anderson, Cristine Reyes, and Rayver Cruz.
- It reran on the following dates with varying timeslots:
  - March 10 to 21, 2025, from 3:30 PM to 4:00 PM.
  - March 24 to 26, 2025, from 3:45 PM to 4:15 PM, to give way to Mr. Queen.
  - March 27 to April 16, 2025, and April 21 to 25, 2025, from 4:30 PM to 5:00 PM, when Mr. Queen was moved to an earlier timeslot from 3:45 PM to 4:30 PM.
  - April 28 to May 17, 2025, from 4:35 PM to 5:05 PM, when Marimar was extended up to an hour from 2:50 PM to 3:50 PM.
  - May 13 to August 1, from 11:30 PM to 12:00 AM, after Frontline Tonight, when it was moved to an evening timeslot, and was temporarily replaced by DiscoverEats for a week, then followed by VIBE Nights a week after.

== See also ==
- List of TV5 (Philippine TV network) original programming
