= Del Tierro =

Philippine television drama series

- Genre: Romantic drama
- Directed by: Ysmael Lampin
- Starring: Jackie Lou Blanco
- Opening theme: "Del Tierro" by Vic Sotto
- Country of origin: Philippines
- Original language: Tagalog
- No. of episodes: 426

Production
- Camera setup: Multiple-camera setup
- Running time: 30 minutes
- Production company: TAPE Inc.

Original release
- Network: GMA Network
- Release: September 15, 1997 – May 14, 1999

Del Tierro (transl. of the ground) is a Philippine television drama romance series broadcast by GMA Network. Starring Jackie Lou Blanco, it premiered on September 15, 1997. The series concluded on May 14, 1999, with a total of 426 episodes.

== Cast and characters ==
Lead cast

- Jackie Lou Blanco as Chanda

Supporting cast

- Kaiser Gonzalez as Tristan
- Eddie Gutierrez as Juan del Tierro
- Tonton Gutierrez as Juancho
- Marjorie Barretto as Lourdes
- Glydel Mercado as Guada
- Amy Austria as Dolor
- Mike Magat as Roldan
- Gary Estrada
- Tirso Cruz III as Rigor
- LJ Moreno as Eliza
- Bella Flores as Lucy
