= List of TV5 original programming =

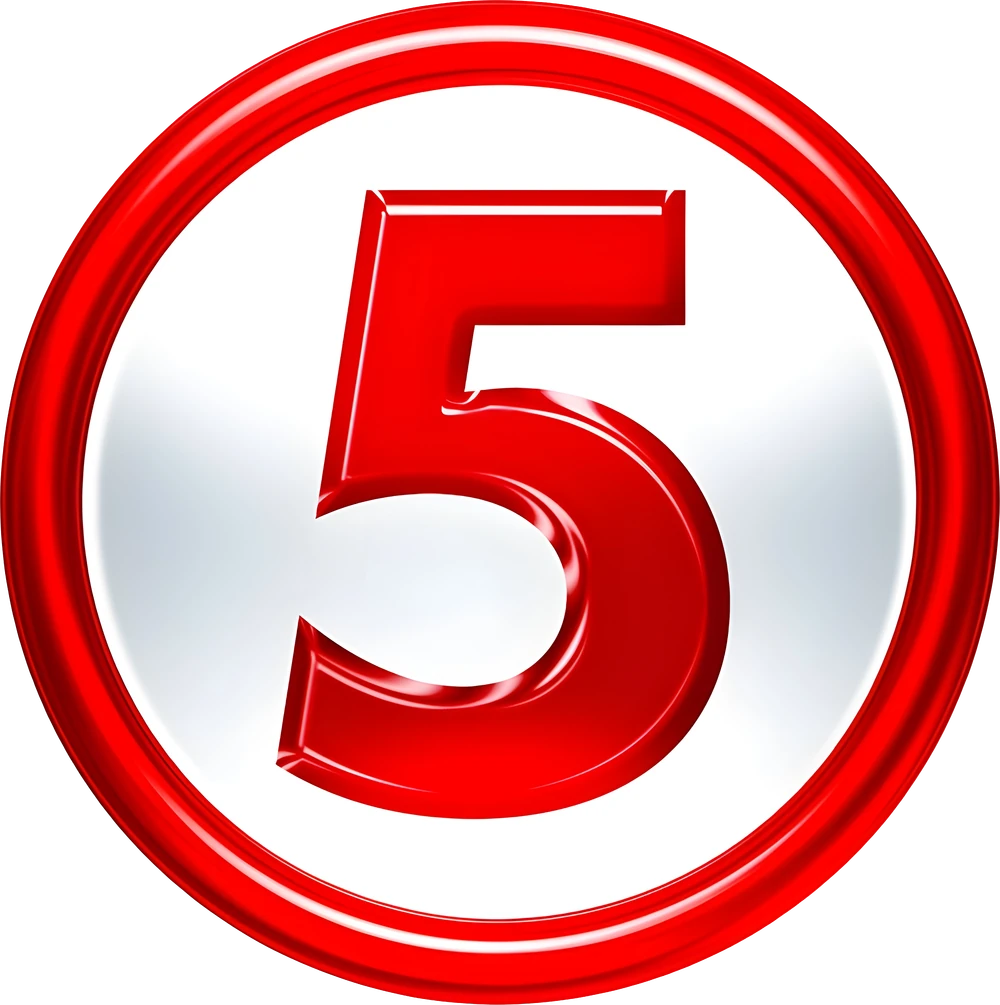

TV5 (also known as 5 and formerly known as ABC) is a Philippine free-to-air television and radio network owned by TV5 Network, Inc. a subsidiary of MediaQuest Holdings, which is controlled by the telecommunications company of PLDT, Inc. Headquartered on TV5 Media Center, Reliance, Mandaluyong City, the original studios and its transmitter are located in Novaliches, Quezon City. The following is a list of all television programming that TV5 is currently broadcasting since it began its television operations in July 1962.

== Current original programming ==
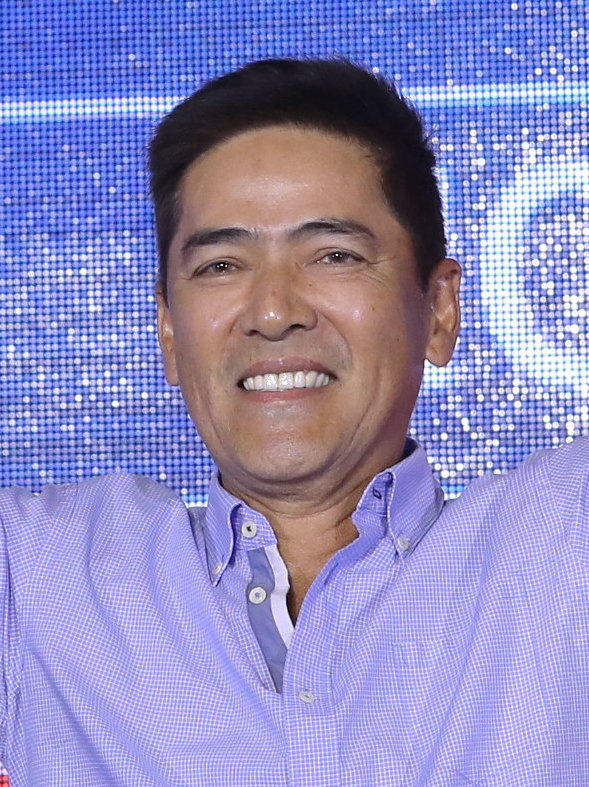
Vic Sotto, host of the variety show Eat Bulaga!.

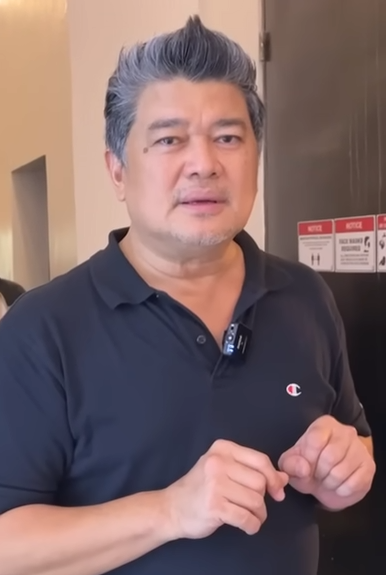
Julius Babao, anchor of the news show Frontline Pilipinas and host of the news entertainment show Julius Babao Unplugged.

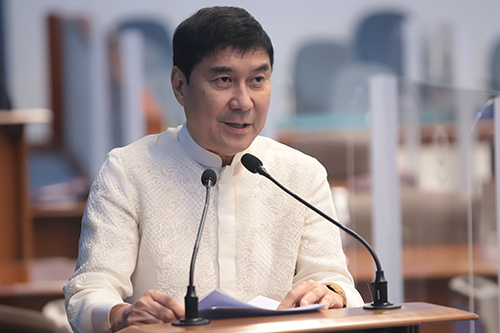
Raffy Tulfo, host of the public service show Kapatid Mo, Idol Raffy Tulfo.

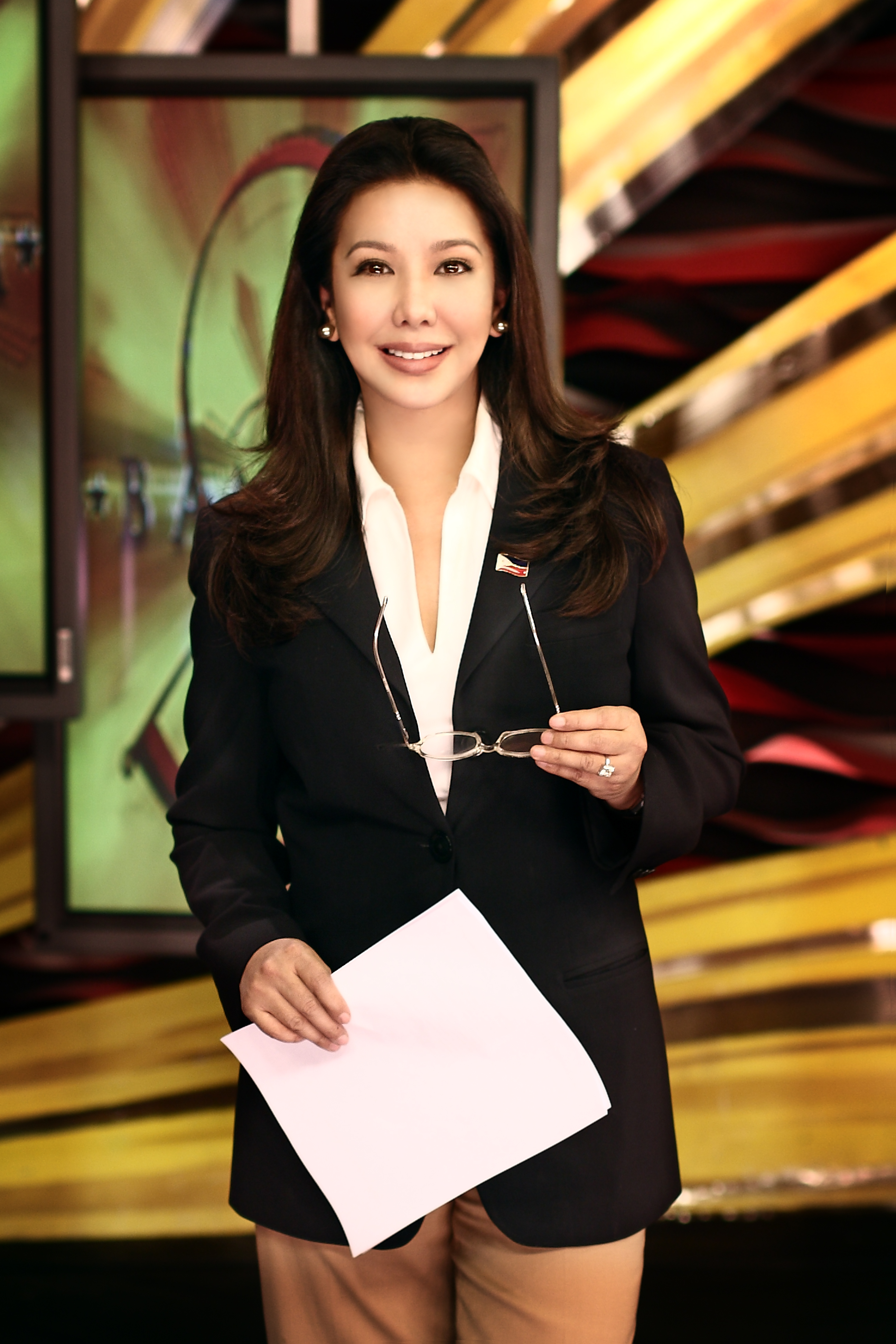
Korina Sanchez, of the news magazine show Rated Korina and host of the talk show Gandang Mornings with Ate Koring.

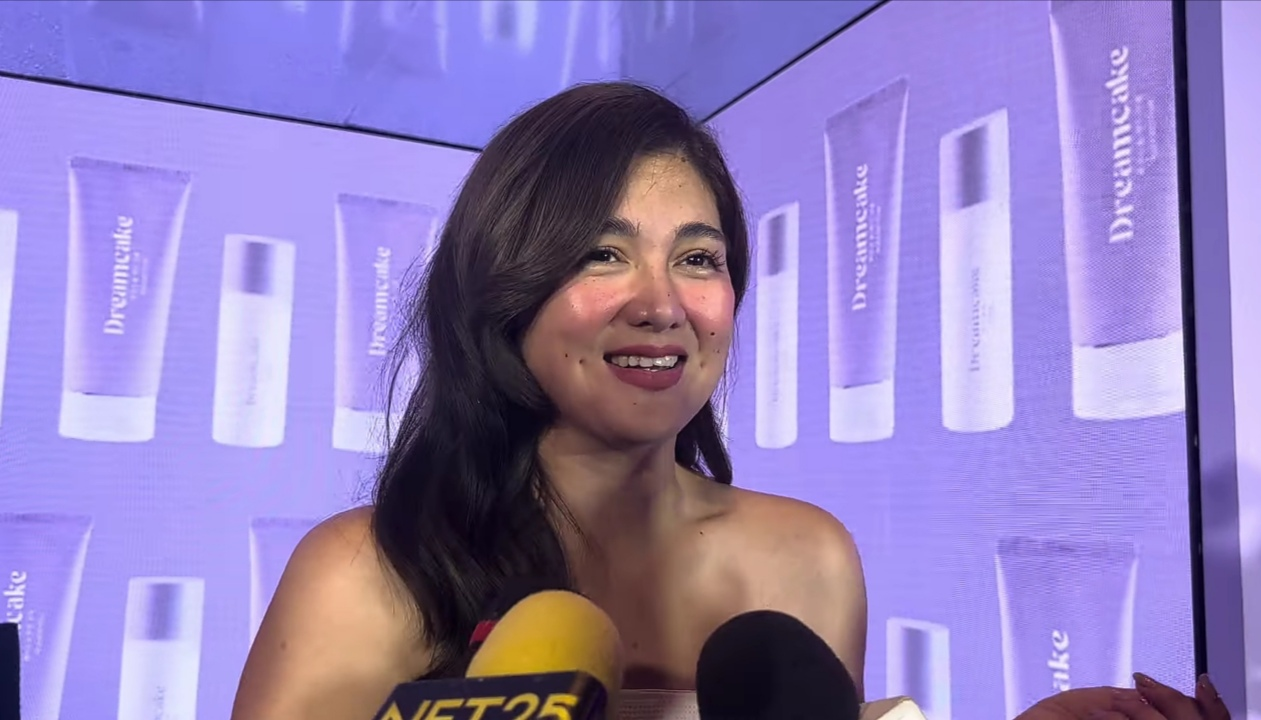
Dimples Romana, host of the morning show Frontline sa Umaga.

TV5 is currently broadcasting twenty-three original programming.

=== Drama ===
Title	Premiere
Mommy Guard	October 19, 2026

=== Variety ===
Title	Premiere
Eat Bulaga!	July 1, 2023 (as E.A.T.); January 6, 2024 (as Eat Bulaga!)
Vibe Plus	August 9, 2025
Vibe Nights	August 11, 2025
Vibe Plus Playback	March 8, 2026
ASAP XP (Note: Under co-production agreement with ABS-CBN Studios.)	October 18, 2026

=== Talk ===
Title	Premiere
Rated Korina	October 24, 2020
Julius Babao Unplugged	September 22, 2024
The Men's Room	May 11, 2025
Matteo G. Primetime	October 10, 2026
Gandang Mornings with Ate Koring	October 12, 2026

=== News ===
Title	Premiere
Frontline Pilipinas	October 5, 2020
Frontline Alerts	October 5, 2020
Frontline Tonight	September 27, 2021
Frontline Pilipinas Weekend	October 14, 2023
Frontline Express	April 8, 2024
Una sa Lahat	May 19, 2025
Frontline sa Umaga	May 10, 2021 (original); August 10, 2026 (revival)

=== Magazine ===
Title	Premiere
Top 5: Mga Kuwentong Marc Logan	April 6, 2024

=== Public Service ===
Title	Premiere
Kapatid Mo, Idol Raffy Tulfo	April 7, 2024

=== Religious ===
Title	Premiere
Misa sa Veritas	March 20, 2020
Oras ng Himala	December 14, 2022
Oras ng Katotohanan	August 17, 2025
Mga Kwentong MX3	March 2, 2026

== Former original programming ==
=== News5 ===
==== News ====
Title	Premiere	Finale	Note
The Big News	1962	September 22, 1972	
The Big News	February 21, 1992	August 8, 2008	
Pangunahing Balita	1962	September 22, 1972	
Sentro	April 12, 2004	August 8, 2008	
TEN: The Evening News (Note: as TV5)	August 11, 2008	March 31, 2010	
Aksyon	April 5, 2010	March 16, 2020	
Sapul sa Singko	April 5, 2010	February 3, 2012	formerly known as Sapul! until October 22, 2010
Aksyon Alerts	April 5, 2010	March 15, 2020	formerly Aksyon Ngayon until late 2010 and Aksyon Alert until 2017
Aksyon Weekend	April 10, 2010	October 24, 2010	
Aksyon Weekend	January 26, 2013	July 12, 2014	
Aksyon JournalisMO	October 25, 2010	February 17, 2012	
Aksyon Sabado	October 30, 2010	August 4, 2012	
Aksyon Linggo	October 31, 2010	August 5, 2012	
Balitaang Tapat	November 1, 2010	May 11, 2012	
Aksyon Bisaya	July 18, 2011	September 8, 2016	
Good Morning Club	February 6, 2012	May 2, 2014	
Metro Aksyon	February 6, 2012	June 29, 2012	
Pilipinas News	February 20, 2012	July 18, 2014	
Pilipinas News Weekend	August 11, 2012	July 13, 2014	
Balitang 60	2012	2014	
The Weekend News	July 26, 2014	December 31, 2023	Formerly from ABS-CBN and PTV
Good Morning Ser	May 5, 2014	July 18, 2014	
Aksyon Dabaw	May 5, 2014	September 8, 2016	
Pulso: Aksyon Balita	August 14, 2017	November 16, 2018	Formerly from ABS-CBN
News5 Headlines	November 19, 2018	September 24, 2021	Formerly from ABS-CBN
The Big Story	March 4, 2019	September 20, 2019	
One Balita	September 23, 2019	October 16, 2020	
One Balita Pilipinas	September 23, 2019	October 2, 2020	
One News Now	March 17, 2020	October 4, 2020	
Ted Failon at DJ Chacha sa Radyo5	October 5, 2020	May 3, 2024	
Gud Morning Kapatid	June 19, 2023	August 7, 2026	

==== Current affairs ====
- Anggulo (2011–2012)
- Agenda with Cito Beltran (2019–2020)
- Crime Klasik (2013)
- Dokumentado (2010–2011, 2012–2013)
- History with Lourd (2013–2016)
- Insider (2012)
- Reaksyon (2012–2017)
- Rescue Mission (2008–2009)
- Rated Korina (co-production with ABS-CBN) (2020–2025)
- S.O.S.: Stories of Survival (2005–2008)
- The Chiefs (2019–2020, 2022, 2023)
- The Probe Team Documentaries (2004–2005)
- Totoo TV (ABC 5: 2005–2007; TV5: 2010–2011)
- Tutok Tulfo (2010–2012)
- USI: Under Special Investigation (2010–2012)
- Presinto 5(2025–2026)
- Wanted (2011–2012)

=== Entertainment ===
==== Series ====
Drama

Title	Premiere	Finale	Note
Batang X: The Next Generation	August 15, 2008	November 14, 2008	
HushHush	August 27, 2008	November 19, 2008	
G&G: Goals & Girls	July 19, 2009	October 11, 2009	
Broken Hearts Club	2010	2010	
My Driver Sweet Lover	October 25, 2010	February 4, 2011	
Babaeng Hampaslupa	February 7, 2011	July 15, 2011	
Mga Nagbabagang Bulaklak	March 21, 2011	June 17, 2011	
Carlo J. Caparas' Bangis	July 4, 2011	September 30, 2011	
The Sisters	July 18, 2011	September 9, 2011	
Ang Utol Kong Hoodlum	September 12, 2011	November 18, 2011	co-production with Viva Television
Sa Ngalan ng Ina	October 3, 2011	November 4, 2011	
Glamorosa	November 7, 2011	February 10, 2012	
P. S. I Love You	November 21, 2011	February 17, 2012	co-production with Viva Television
Valiente	February 13, 2012	June 29, 2012	co-production with TAPE Inc.
Nandito Ako	February 20, 2012	March 23, 2012	
Felina: Prinsesa ng mga Pusa	February 27, 2012	May 25, 2012	
Isang Dakot na Luha	February 27, 2012	June 15, 2012	
Enchanted Garden	July 30, 2012	January 4, 2013	
Kidlat	January 7, 2013	May 3, 2013	
Never Say Goodbye	February 11, 2013	May 10, 2013	
Cassandra: Warrior Angel	May 6, 2013	August 2, 2013	
Misibis Bay	July 1, 2013	August 30, 2013	
Undercover	July 1, 2013	August 30, 2013	
Madam Chairman	October 14, 2013	February 28, 2014	
For Love or Money	October 17, 2013	January 16, 2014	
Positive	October 17, 2013	January 16, 2014	
Obsession	January 23, 2014	April 10, 2014	
Confessions of a Torpe	March 3, 2014	June 20, 2014	
Beki Boxer	March 31, 2014	July 4, 2014	
Jasmine	June 1, 2014	August 3, 2014	co-production with Unitel Pictures and Ace Saatchi
Trenderas	September 13, 2014	December 27, 2014	
Baker King	May 18, 2015	September 11, 2015	
My Fair Lady	September 14, 2015	December 11, 2015	
Bakit Manipis ang Ulap?	February 15, 2016	April 22, 2016	co-production with Viva Television
Carlo J. Caparas' Ang Panday	February 29, 2016	June 2, 2016	co-production with Viva Television
10 Signatures to Bargain with God	October 21, 2017	January 20, 2018	co-production with Viva Television
Hourglass	January 27, 2018	April 21, 2018	co-production with Viva Television
Wives of House No. 2	January 27, 2018	July 18, 2020	co-production with Viva Television
Amo	April 21, 2018	July 14, 2018	
Operation: Break the Casanova's Heart	April 28, 2018	July 28, 2018	co-production with Viva Television
The Mysterious Case of Bea Montenegro	April 29, 2018	July 29, 2018	co-production with Viva Television
Diary of a 30-Something	July 20, 2020	2020	co-production with Viva Television
The Legal Mistress	July 20, 2020	2020	co-production with Viva Television
My Extraordinary	September 27, 2020	November 22, 2020	produced by AsterisK Entertainment
I Got You	October 18, 2020	January 17, 2021	produced by Brightlight Productions and Cornerstone Studios
Ate ng Ate Ko	November 23, 2020	February 15, 2021	co-production with Archangel Media
Paano ang Pangako?	November 23, 2020	March 31, 2021	originally titled as Paano ang Pasko? co-production with The IdeaFirst Company
Stay-In Love	November 24, 2020	February 16, 2021	co-production with Cignal Entertainment and Cornerstone Studios
Bella Bandida	November 25, 2020	December 30, 2020	co-production with Viva Television
Carpool	November 26, 2020	December 31, 2020	co-production with Archangel Media and Cignal Entertainment
Sleepless: The Series	January 6, 2021	February 17, 2021	co-production with The IdeaFirst Company
Gen Z	March 7, 2021	May 30, 2021	co-production with Regal Entertainment
Encounter: The Philippine Adaptation	March 20, 2021	October 30, 2021	co-production with Cignal Entertainment and Viva Television
Niña Niño	April 5, 2021	May 19, 2022	co-production with Cignal Entertainment and Cornerstone Studios
Di Na Muli	September 18, 2021	December 18, 2021	co-production with Viva Television
Suntok sa Buwan	July 18, 2022	December 8, 2022	co-production with Cignal Entertainment
The Brilliant Life	December 17, 2022	January 7, 2023	
The Rain In España	May 14, 2023	July 16, 2023	produced by Studio Viva
Minsan pa Nating Hagkan ang Nakaraan	July 25, 2023	October 20, 2023	produced by Studio Viva
Lumuhod Ka Sa Lupa	April 8, 2024	May 2, 2025	produced by Studio Viva
Padyak Princess	June 10, 2024	September 27, 2024	co-production with Cignal Entertainment and APT Entertainment
Ang Himala ni Niño	September 30, 2024	April 11, 2025	co-production with Cignal Entertainment and Cornerstone Studios
Totoy Bato	May 5, 2025	April 24, 2026	produced by Studio Viva
Ang Mutya ng Section E	May 19, 2025	July 18, 2025	
Seducing Drake Palma	July 21, 2025	October 3, 2025	
Bad Genius: The Series	October 18, 2025	April 18, 2026	
Project Loki	May 23, 2026	September 20, 2026	
A Secret in Prague	April 27, 2026	October 2, 2026	
My Bespren Emman	April 27, 2026	October 2, 2026	

Fantasy and horror

Title	Premiere	Finale	Note
Darna	1961	1961	
Darna at Ang Impakta	1965	1965	
Malikmata	1972	1972	
Batang X: The Series	1995	1996	
Guni Guni	1996	1996	
Que Horror	1996	1998	
Midnight DJ	August 11, 2008	May 14, 2011	
Moomoo and Me	September 10, 2009	September 2, 2010	
Pidol's Wonderland	April 4, 2010	January 20, 2013	
Regal Shocker	November 5, 2011	April 28, 2012	co-production with Regal Entertainment
Kapitan Awesome	February 19, 2012	May 5, 2013	
Third Eye	July 29, 2012	October 21, 2012	
#ParangNormal Activity	July 11, 2015	May 7, 2016	co-production with The IdeaFirst Company
Tasya Fantasya	February 6, 2016	April 30, 2016	co-production with Viva Television
Ang Kwarto Sa May Hagdanan	January 28, 2018	April 22, 2018	co-production with Viva Television
Barrio Kulimlim	January 28, 2018	April 22, 2018	co-production with Viva Television
Ghost Adventures	October 31, 2020	January 23, 2021	co-production with Viva Television
Kagat ng Dilim	November 27, 2020	March 21, 2021	co-production with Viva Television
Puto	June 19, 2021	September 11, 2021	co-production with Viva Television
Mga Kwentong Epik	June 18, 2022	October 15, 2022	produced by Epik Studios
Para sa Isa't Isa	September 13, 2025	February 21, 2026	produced by MavenPro and Sari-Sari Network, Inc.

Anthology

Title	Premiere	Finale	Note
Handog ni Brocka	1992	1992	
Viva Telekomiks	1992	1992	produced by Viva Television
Studio 5 Presents	1992	1993	
Love Notes	1993	1998	
Nora	1995	1995	
Nora Aunor Sunday Drama Special	1995	1996	
Pangarap Kong Jackpot	2000	2001	
Lovebooks Presents	August 12, 2008	November 4, 2008	
5 Star Specials	March 22, 2010	September 1, 2010	
Star Confessions	December 8, 2010	August 31, 2011	
Real Confessions	November 5, 2011	February 11, 2012	
Untold Stories	September 9, 2010	September 29, 2012	
Istorifik: Pidol's Kwentong Fantastik	January 27, 2013	September 8, 2013	
LolaBasyang.com	July 11, 2015	January 30, 2016	produced by The IdeaFirst Company
Dear God	May 23, 2022	July 14, 2022	produced by Ria Productions
For the Love	August 5, 2023	October 28, 2023	produced by Viva Television

Television film

- Brillante Mendoza Presents (2017)

==== Variety and musical ====
Title	Premiere	Finale	Note
Kool on Kam	2004	produced by Kool 106	
P.O.5	April 11, 2010	February 20, 2011	
Fan*tastik	February 27, 2011	May 22, 2011	
Willing Willie / Wil Time Bigtime	October 23, 2010; May 14, 2011	April 8, 2011; January 5, 2013	
Hey It's Saberdey!	June 18, 2011	February 4, 2012	
Sunday Funday	April 8, 2012	June 10, 2012	
Game 'N Go	June 17, 2012	February 3, 2013	retitled as Game N' Go All-Stars in January 2013
Wowowillie	January 26, 2013	October 12, 2013	
The Mega and the Songwriter	September 15, 2013	January 26, 2014	
Happy Truck ng Bayan	June 14, 2015	February 7, 2016	
MTV Top 20 Pilipinas	February 6, 2016	September 24, 2016	
Happy Truck HAPPinas	March 6, 2016	May 1, 2016	co-production with ContentCows Company Inc.
HAPPinas Happy Hour	May 6, 2016	September 30, 2016	co-production with ContentCows Company Inc.
Coke Studio Philippines	July 29, 2017	October 14, 2017	in cooperation with Coca-Cola Beverages Philippines
Sunday Noontime Live!	October 18, 2020	January 17, 2021	produced by Brightlight Productions and Cornerstone Studios
Tropang LOL	October 19, 2020	April 29, 2023	produced by Brightlight Productions
It's Showtime	July 16, 2022	June 30, 2023	produced by ABS-CBN Studios
E.A.T... / TVJ Noontime Show	July 1, 2023	January 5, 2024	produced by TVJ Productions
Wil To Win	July 14, 2024	April 25, 2025	produced by WinQuest Productions

==== Kid-oriented ====
Title	Premiere	Finale	Note
5 and Up	May 16, 1992	1994	
Chikiting Patrol	October 19, 2002	2005	
Batang X: The Next Generation	August 15, 2008	November 14, 2008	
Mustard TV	August 16, 2008	October 16, 2010	produced by Shepherd's Voice Publications Inc.
Toogs	August 2008	2009	
Kiddie Kwela	November 25, 2008	March 30, 2010	
Batibot	November 27, 2010	2013	
Biyaheng Bulilit	2009	2010	
Camp Tiger	2010	2010	in cooperation with Mondelez International
Hi-5 Philippines	June 15, 2015	April 29, 2016	

==== Youth-oriented ====
Title	Premiere	Finale	Note
Kool Skool	1993	1993	produced by Viva Television
Rakista	August 14, 2008	November 20, 2008	
Lipgloss	August 16, 2008	August 29, 2009	
BFGF	April 11, 2010	January 30, 2011	
Bagets: Just Got Lucky	May 15, 2011	February 12, 2012	produced by Viva Television
Wattpad Presents	September 22, 2014	July 29, 2017	reformatted as a television movie special in February 2016

==== Reality ====
Title	Premiere	Finale	Note
S.O.S.: Stories of Survival	November 3, 2005	August 4, 2008	
Todo Max	July 2006	January 2007	
Global Shockers	2006	2007	
Hayop Na Hayop	2006	2007	
Ripley's Believe It Or Not: Philippine Edition	2006	2007	
Ultimate Guinness World Records Pinoy Edition	2006	2007	
That's My Job	July 5, 2008	August 2, 2008	
Philippines Scariest Challenge	August 22, 2008	September 3, 2009	
OMG	November 24, 2008	2009	
Kuwentong Talentado	September 7, 2009	March 15, 2010	spin-off of Talentadong Pinoy
The Biggest Game Show in the World Asia	February 12, 2012	May 13, 2012	
Video Incredible	March 3, 2012	2012	
Extreme Makeover: Home Edition Philippines	April 15, 2012	June 17, 2012	
The Amazing Race Philippines	October 29, 2012	December 7, 2014	
Kung May Hirap, May Ginhawa	2012	2013	
The Alabang Housewives	January 14, 2013	February 8, 2013	
Boracay Bodies	April 6, 2013	May 25, 2013	in cooperation with Tanduay
Karinderya Wars	April 8, 2013	June 14, 2013	produced by Futuretainment Inc.
Juan Direction	October 19, 2013	October 3, 2014	produced by News5 and Island Media Asia
It Takes Gutz to Be A Gutierrez	July 5, 2014	August 23, 2014	produced by One Mega Group
Extreme Series: Tae Ba To?	February 2, 2015	June 20, 2015	
Philippines' Next Top Model: High Street	March 21, 2017	May 30, 2017	
Sidecourt Chef	November 4, 2018	January 27, 2019	
Kumusta	May 24, 2026	June 28, 2026	
The Singing Lodi	July 5, 2026	August 9, 2026	

Talent-based

Title	Premiere	Finale	Note
Batang Vidaylin	2000	2001	in cooperation with Abbott Laboratories
Hollywood Dream	July 17, 2005	November 20, 2005	
Shall We Dance?	November 6, 2005	March 28, 2010	
Philippine Idol	July 30, 2006	December 10, 2006	Idol franchise series later returned on the network with the ABS-CBN Entertainment produced Idol Philippines in 2022.
Talentadong Pinoy	August 16, 2008	December 13, 2014	
Talentadong Pinoy	August 15, 2020	March 13, 2021	retitled as Bangon Talentadong Pinoy; co-production with The IdeaFirst Company
Star Factor	September 12, 2010	December 5, 2010	
Artista Academy	July 30, 2012	October 27, 2012	
Kanta Pilipinas	February 9, 2013	March 24, 2013	co-production with Futuretainment Inc.
Celebrity Dance Battle	March 22, 2014	June 28, 2014	
Move It: Clash of the Streetdancers	January 25, 2015	May 3, 2015	
Rising Stars Philippines	March 14, 2015	May 23, 2015	
KISPinoy: The K-Pop Philippination	July 11, 2015	July 25, 2015	produced by YU&IQ International
Born to Be a Star	February 6, 2016	May 8, 2021	co-production with Viva Television
Masked Singer Pilipinas	October 24, 2020	August 17, 2025	co-production with Viva Television
POPinoy	June 13, 2021	November 7, 2021	co-production with TNT and Archangel Media
Top Class	June 18, 2022	August 20, 2022	co-production with Cornerstone (CS) Studios and Kumu
Be The Next: 9 Dreamers	February 8, 2025	May 10, 2025	co-production with MLD Entertainment, Artsro and DNM Entertainment
Love on the Clock	October 10, 2025	November 29, 2025	

==== Game ====
Title	Premiere	Finale	Note
B na B: Baliw na Baliw	1995	1998	
Instant Dyakpat	1998	1998	
Go For It	1998	1999	
Easy Money	August 5, 2000	December 30, 2000	
Wheel of Fortune	November 19, 2001	May 31, 2002	
Family Feud	November 19, 2001	December 28, 2002	
The Price is Right	November 25, 2001	March 9, 2003	
Game Extreme Channel	2003	2004	
Philippine Lottery Draw	2003	2005	
Puso o Pera	April 2004	2004	co-production with PCSO
Blind Item	November 5, 2005	2006	Showbiz-oriented
Premyo sa Resibo	2006	2007	co-production with PCSO
Slingo	July 21, 2007	2007	
Win Win Win	November 2007	2008	
Double W	2007	2008	
Text 2 Win	2008	2008	
Mysmatch	August 11, 2008	November 2008	
You and Me Against the World	November 23, 2008	February 15, 2009	
Baikingu	November 25, 2008	March 9, 2010	
Who Wants to Be a Millionaire?	May 23, 2009	November 22, 2015	
Camp Tiger	July 2010	October 2010	in cooperation with Mondelez International
Celebrity Cook-Off	July 2010	October 2010	
House or Not	2010	2011	
Laugh or Lose	October 9, 2010	May 28, 2011	co-production with M-Zet Productions
Celebrity Samurai	February 27, 2011	June 10, 2012	originally titled as Pinoy Samurai
Lucky Numbers	February 27, 2011	May 8, 2011	
R.U. Kidding Me	June 4, 2011	October 29, 2011	
Big Shot Jackpot	July 2011	2011	co-production with Smart Communications
Toink! Sino ang Tama?	February 12, 2012	May 13, 2012	
The Million Peso Money Drop	October 14, 2012	February 17, 2013	
Jeepney Jackpot: Pera o Para!	January 7, 2013	April 5, 2013	
Karinderya Wars	April 8, 2013	June 14, 2013	
Let's Ask Pilipinas	October 14, 2013	November 21, 2014	
Killer Karaoke: Pinoy Naman	November 16, 2013	April 26, 2014	
Quiet Please!: Bawal ang Maingay	August 10, 2014	January 11, 2015	
Barangay Utakan	November 29, 2015	June 12, 2016	produced by News5
Bawal na Game Show	August 15, 2020	March 30, 2021	co-production with Archangel Media
Fill in the Bank	August 15, 2020	March 31, 2021	co-production with Archangel Media
The Wall Philippines	March 13, 2021	September 11, 2021	co-production with Viva Television; Season 1 only
1000 Heartbeats: Pintig Pinoy	March 20, 2021	June 12, 2021	co-production with Viva Television
Sing Galing!	April 5, 2021	December 22, 2022	co-production with Cignal Entertainment and Cornerstone Studios
Rolling In It Philippines	June 5, 2021	September 24, 2022	co-production with Viva Television
Spingo	September 11, 2023	December 8, 2023	
Barangay Singko Panalo	March 11, 2024	June 28, 2024	co-production with The IdeaFirst Company
Quizmosa	October 21, 2024	January 18, 2025	
Sing Galing! (season 3)	March 1, 2025; new season	August 3, 2025	co-production with Cignal Entertainment and Cornerstone Studios
Emojination	May 14, 2023	August 30, 2025	

==== Comedy ====
Title	Premiere	Finale	Note
Gorio And His Jeepney	1962	1968	
Balitang Barbero	1965	1965	
Trio Los Bobos	1970	1970	
Bahay-bahayan	1972	1972	
17 Bernard Club	1992	1994	co-production with Viva Television
Alabang Girls	1992	1994	co-production with Viva Television
Caloy's Angels	1992	1992	
Idol si Pidol	1992	1995	
Mr. DJ	1992	1992	
Starzan	1992	1992	
Stay Awake	1992	1992	
TVJ on 5	1992	1992	
Tondominium	1993	1994	
We R Family	1993	1994	
Rock and Roll 2000	1994	1994	
Tropang Trumpo	March 12, 1994	March 13, 1999	
O-gag	1996	1998	
Que Horror	1996	1998	
Wow Mali	May 25, 1996	April 16, 2005	
Wow Mali	February 22, 2009	September 1, 2010	
Wow Mali	April 11, 2011	February 5, 2012	
Ispup	March 20, 1999	March 7, 2003	
Side Stitch	2001	2002	
Ispup Atbp.	March 16, 2003	February 15, 2004	
Wow Maling Mali!	April 23, 2005	July 22, 2006	
Comedy Bites	2005	2007	
Wala Yan sa Lolo Ko!	November 3, 2005	2006	
Teka Mona!	July 29, 2006	May 19, 2007	
O-Ha!	August 7, 2006	September 2006	
Wow Mali Bytes	May 26, 2007	July 28, 2007	
Mommy Elvie's Problematic Show	June 19, 2007	August 5, 2008	produced by Ideal Minds Corp.
Wow Mali Express	August 4, 2007	August 2, 2008	
Ogags	August 13, 2008	March 31, 2010	
Lokomoko	August 15, 2008	February 20, 2009	
Lokomoko	March 4, 2011	July 22, 2012	
Everybody Hapi	November 23, 2008	September 4, 2010	
Ha Ha Hayop	November 24, 2008	August 31, 2009	
Arekup Video Zonkers	November 21, 2008	2009	
Shock Attack	2008	2009	
The Weakend News With Ramon Bautista	2008	2009	
Front Act	July 19, 2009	March 7, 2010	
Lokomoko High	February 27, 2009	March 26, 2010	
My Darling Aswang	April 4, 2010	May 8, 2011	
Lokomoko U	April 7, 2010	February 25, 2011	
Lokomoko U	July 28, 2012	September 1, 2013	
Inday Wanda	September 6, 2010	January 17, 2011	
Wow Meganon	September 6, 2010	April 8, 2011	
Hap-ier Togeder	September 7, 2010	May 17, 2011	
Lady Dada	September 8, 2010	October 6, 2010	
Urban Tales: Tawatakutan	2010	2010	
Magic? Gimik! Revealed	October 17, 2010	May 8, 2011	also known as Magic? Gimik!: Pinoy Walastik
Swerte-Swerte Lang!	January 24, 2011	April 4, 2011	
Magic? Bagsik!	May 15, 2011	February 4, 2012	
Iskul Bukol	May 24, 2011	September 27, 2011	
Sugo Mga Kapatid	June 4, 2011	October 29, 2011	
The Jose and Wally Show Starring Vic Sotto	November 5, 2011	September 8, 2012	
Tropang Kulit	May 11, 2013	September 7, 2013	
Tropa Mo Ko Unli	September 14, 2013	June 21, 2014	
Wow Mali Pa Rin!	September 15, 2013	April 6, 2014	
Wow Mali Lakas ng Tama!	April 13, 2014	June 28, 2015	
One of the Boys	May 3, 2014	July 5, 2014	
Tropa Mo Ko Nice Di Ba?!	June 28, 2014	January 2015	
Tropa Mo Ko Unli Spoof	January 2015	July 4, 2015	
2½ Daddies	January 24, 2015	July 4, 2015	
Mac and Chiz	January 25, 2015	June 28, 2015	
No Harm, No Foul	July 5, 2015	November 1, 2015	
Misterless Misis	August 9, 2015	August 16, 2015	
Kano Luvs Pinay	September 5, 2015	December 19, 2015	
Tanods	September 6, 2015	October 4, 2015	
Ha-pi House	October 21, 2017	February 18, 2021	
Sunday 'Kada	October 18, 2020	January 17, 2021	produced by Brightlight Productions
Oh My Dad!	October 24, 2020	April 24, 2021	produced by Brightlight Productions
John en Ellen	January 24, 2021	August 1, 2021	
BalitaOnenan!	July 18, 2022	October 11, 2022	
Oh My Korona	August 6, 2022	November 26, 2022	co-production with Cignal Entertainment
Kalye Kweens	October 1, 2022	December 24, 2022	co-production with Cignal Entertainment
Kurdapya	March 19, 2023	June 17, 2023	co-production with Cignal Entertainment
Team A	March 19, 2023	October 7, 2023	co-production with Cignal Entertainment
Jack & Jill sa Diamond Hills	May 14, 2023	May 5, 2024	co-production with Cignal Entertainment
Da Pers Family	July 21, 2024	May 11, 2025	

==== Talk ====
Title	Premiere	Finale	Note
Secrets with Juliana Palermo	August 17, 2004	2005	
Juicy!	August 11, 2008	August 3, 2012	
The Medyo Late Night Show with Jojo A.	June 1, 2009	November 6, 2015	produced by JojoATV Group
Face to Face	March 22, 2010	October 18, 2013	
Sharon: Kasama Mo, Kapatid	May 14, 2012	January 4, 2013	
Ang Latest	August 6, 2012	July 19, 2013	
Showbiz Police	September 14, 2013	June 6, 2014	
What's Up Doods?	September 14, 2013	January 18, 2014	
Face the People	October 14, 2013	November 21, 2014	
Happy Wife, Happy Life	January 19, 2015	October 2, 2015	
Solved na Solved	January 19, 2015	April 17, 2015	
Call Me Papa Jack	January 24, 2015	April 19, 2015	
Showbiz Konek na Konek	April 6, 2015	October 2, 2015	
Usapang Real Life	August 15, 2020	January 16, 2021	co-production with ContentCows Company Inc.
Chika, Besh!	August 17, 2020	January 8, 2021	co-production with Archangel Media
Lakwatsika	April 18, 2022	July 15, 2022	
Tik Talks	December 3, 2022	May 31, 2026	
Magandang Buhay	February 6, 2023	March 1, 2024	
Face 2 Face	May 1, 2023	October 18, 2024	
Ogie Diaz Inspires	April 25, 2026	September 6, 2026	

==== Lifestyle and magazine ====
Title	Premiere	Finale	Note
Titas of the Metro	November 3, 2018	December 8, 2018	
From Helen's Kitchen	November 3, 2018	May 9, 2026	
Fit for Life	August 16, 2020	November 1, 2020	
Rated Korina	October 24, 2020	December 28, 2025	co-production with ABS-CBN News and Brightlight Productions
Kusina ni Mamang	June 19, 2022	October 15, 2023	
At Your Home with Anthony and Maricel	July 30, 2023	October 23, 2023	

Travelogue

Title	Premiere	Finale	Note
Pinoy Explorer	September 18, 2011	March 15, 2014	
#MaineGoals	February 6, 2023	October 28, 2023	co-production with APT Entertainment

==== Informative ====
Title	Premiere	Finale	Note
Home Sweet House	November 1995	1997	
Asenso Pinoy	July 23, 2005	August 2, 2008	
Ating Alamin	2005	2007	
Proactiv Solution	2008		

=== Religious ===
- Community Mass on ABC (2004–2008)
- Family Matters (produced by Family Rosary Crusade) (2010–2016)
- Family Rosary Crusade (1992–2008)
- Kape't Pandasal (produced by JesCom Foundation) (2022–present) (formerly from ABS-CBN, 2004–2020)
- Signs and Wonders (2007–2008)
- Three Minutes a Day with Fr. James Reuter SJ (produced by Family Rosary Crusade) (1998–2008)
- The Word Exposed with Luis Antonio Tagle (produced by JesCom Foundation) (2008—2010)
- Word Made Flesh (2004–2008)

=== Sports-oriented ===
- The Basketball Show (2004–2005)
- Blow by Blow (2015–2016)
- IPBA (2006–2007)
- NCAA Games (2013–2015)
- Sports 360 (2015–2016)
- SportsCenter Philippines (2017–2020)

== Former regional programming ==
=== News ===
- Aksyon Dabaw (2014–2016, TV5 Davao)

== See also ==
- List of Philippine television shows
