= Totoo TV =

Philippine reality-news television show

- Genre: Newscast
- Starring: Maverick Relova; Ariel Villasanta
- Country of origin: Philippines
- No. of episodes: 78

Production
- Executive producer: Jose Mario Fuderanan
- Running time: 30 minutes 1 hour (producer's cut)
- Production company: News5

Original release
- Network: ABC 5/TV5
- Release: October 31, 2005 – September 19, 2007
- Release: April 5, 2010 – October 7, 2011

Totoo TV (lit. Real TV) is a Philippine television news broadcasting show broadcast by ABC/TV5. Hosted by Maverick Relova and Ariel Villasanta, it aired on ABC, from October 31, 2005 to September 19, 2007. It returned to TV5 from April 5, 2010 to October 7, 2011, replacing Urban Tribe and was replaced by Bitag.

== Hosts ==
- Maverick Relova
- Ariel Villasanta

== See also ==
- List of TV5 (Philippine TV network) original programming
- Mommy Elvie's Problematic Show
