= Instant Daddy =

2023 Filipino film by Crisanto Aquino

- Theatrical release poster
- Directed by: Crisanto Aquino
- Screenplay by: Penzer Baterna
- Based on: Instructions Not Included
- Produced by: Vincent Del Rosario III; Veronique Del Rosario-Corpus
- Starring: Jerald Napoles; Ryza Cenon; Danita Paner; Althea Ruedas
- Cinematography: Alex Espartero
- Edited by: Vanessa De Leon
- Music by: Decky Margaja
- Production companies: Viva Films; Globalgate Entertainment
- Distributed by: Viva Films
- Release date: October 11, 2023
- Running time: 112 minutes
- Country: Philippines
- Language: Filipino

Instant Daddy is a 2023 Philippine comedy-drama film produced and distributed by Viva Films. It is based on Mexican film Instructions Not Included, and features Jerald Napoles, Ryza Cenon and Althea Ruedas. The film was released theatrically on October 11, 2023.

== Cast ==
- Jerald Napoles as Valentin "Val" Roxas
- Ryza Cenon as Kate
- Althea Ruedas as Mirasol "Mira" Roxas
- Danita Paner as Julie Villalobos
- Jao Mapa as Lito Roxas
- Nikko Natividad as Rico
- Mc Muah as Wilson "Whitney"
- Nicco Manalo as Jani
- Benj Manalo as Mitoy
- Jobelyn Manuel as Marieta Roxa
- Rabin Angeles as Winston

== Production ==
The film was announced by Viva Films. Jerald Napoles, Ryza Cenon and Althea Ruedas was cast to appear in the film. The film is the Pinoy adaptation of the 2013 Mexican film Instructions Not Included, directed by Eugenio Derbez. The first look of the film was released on June 10, 2023.
