= Fan*tastik =

2011 Philippine defunct television musical variety show

- Genre: Variety show
- Created by: Associated Broadcasting Company
- Developed by: TV5 Entertainment Division
- Directed by: Al Quinn
- Presented by: Various Hosts and Performers
- Opening theme: "Fan*tastik Theme Song"
- Ending theme: "Fan*tastik Theme Song"
- Country of origin: Philippines
- Original language: Filipino
- No. of episodes: 13

Production
- Running time: 1 hour

Original release
- Network: TV5
- Release: February 27 – May 22, 2011

Fan*tastik is a Philippine television variety show broadcast by TV5. Hosted by JC de Vera, Danita Paner, Alex Gonzaga, Kean Cipriano, IC Mendoza and Arci Muñoz, it aired from February 27 to May 22, 2011, replacing P.O.5 and was replaced by Sunday Sineplex. The show was broadcast from the Westside Studios at the Broadway Centrum in Quezon City.

== Hosts ==
- JC de Vera
- Danita Paner
- Alex Gonzaga
- Kean Cipriano
- IC Mendoza
- Arci Muñoz

=== Performers ===
- Empoy Marquez
- Diane Medina
- Rodjun Cruz
- Mo Twister
- Jasmine Curtis-Smith
- Rainier Castillo
- Carla Humphries
- Edgar Allan Guzman
- Lucky Mercado
- Jay Durias (Musical Director)
- Gerald Santos
- Wendy Valdez
- Princess Ryan
- Yana Asistio
- Annyka Asistio
- Star Factors Final 12

== See also ==
- List of TV5 (Philippine TV network) original programming
