= The Basketball Show =

- Created by: Associated Broadcasting Company (2004–2005); Radio Philippines Network (2005–2007)
- Developed by: Face Team
- Directed by: Bill Velasco
- Starring: Bill Velasco
- Country of origin: Philippines
- No. of episodes: aired every Saturday

Production
- Executive producer: Chino Trinidad
- Camera setup: multi-camera set-up
- Running time: 1 hour

Original release
- Network: ABC 5 (2004–2005); RPN 9 (2005–2007)
- Release: 2004 – 2007

The Basketball Show is a Philippine television sports competition show broadcast by ABC, RPN and Basketball TV. Hosted by Bill Velasco, it aired on ABC from 2004 to 2005. The show moved to RPN from 2005 to 2007 and Basketball TV from 2006 to 2007.

It was also the title of CBS Sports' NBA pre-game show for the 1990 NBA playoffs, with Pat O'Brien and Bill Raftery. The program discontinued when CBS lost rights to NBA games after that season.

== See also ==
- List of TV5 (Philippine TV network) original programming
- List of programs previously broadcast by Radio Philippines Network
