= Isang Dakot na Luha =

- Genre: Drama
- Created by: TV5 Network, Inc.
- Written by: Renato Custodio Jr. Charlotte Dianco; Renee Dimcia; Adrian Ho; Evie Macapugay
- Directed by: Eric S. Quizon
- Starring: Alice Dixson; Danita Paner; Jay Manalo; Glydel Mercado; Lianne Valentin; Daria Ramirez
- Theme music composer: Boy Christopher Ramos
- Opening theme: "Isang Dakot na Luha" by Katrina Velarde
- Country of origin: Philippines
- Original language: Filipino
- No. of episodes: 78

Production
- Executive producer: Jhanice Casallo-Damaso
- Running time: 30-45 minutes

Original release
- Network: TV5
- Release: February 27 – June 15, 2012

Isang Dakot na Luha (One Handful of Tears) is a 2012 Philippine television drama series broadcast by TV5. Directed by Eric S. Quizon, it stars Alice Dixson, Danita Paner, Jay Manalo, Glydel Mercado, Lianne Valentin and Daria Ramirez. It aired February 27 to June 15, 2012.

The series is all about a story of a mother, in her struggle to keep her children from being taken away from her, needs to deal with unfortunate circumstances. Amelia played by Alice Dixson and Mario played by Jay Manalo, an ill-fated couple who get estranged from each other and will soon lose their three children.

== Synopsis ==
The San Diegos are a poor but happy family raised by the good couple, Amelia and Mario with their three daughters; Angela, Almira and Mirasol. They lived with Mario's stepmother, Lucing, who secretly maltreated Amelia. Because of their debts, Mario decided to find a job and work in Manila where he met Veronica Vergara, a prominent and wealthy heiress of Mr. Vergara's fortune. Veronica falls in love with Mario. She seduces him and plans to have him as her husband. When Veronica finds out about Mario's family, she plans to destroy them with the help of Mario's evil stepmother Lucing as an accomplice.

Amelia decided to work abroad to support their needs but this made her fall in Veronica's trap. She was hostaged by an illegal employer for several years. Angela, Almira and Pangga was left to Amelia's bestfriend Edna but an accident led Edna's death after she saved Almira from getting hit by a vehicle. The poor little San Diegos were left to Lucing where they were maltreated. Veronica apprenticed Lucing to change Amelia's good image to her children.

Amelia and Mario's daughters fate which is to separate from each other faced them. Time came when Veronica's daughter Lyla died and because she wanted to have a child again she decided to have Almira. Pangga was separated from Angela and was left to Helga, a Chinese businesswoman who adopted her. Angela was then left alone with resentment against her mother who she knew was the cause of the ruin and misfortune their family obtained.

== Cast and characters ==
=== Main cast ===
- Alice Dixson as Amelia San Diego/Amelis Reyes
- Danita Paner as Angela San Diego
- Jay Manalo as Mario San Diego
- Glydel Mercado as Veronica Vergara-San Diego
- Lianne Valentin as Almira
- Junyka Santarin as Pangga/Ging-ging

=== Supporting cast ===
- Karel Marquez as Bernadette
- Daria Ramirez as Lucing
- Jenny Miller as Fiona
- Edgar Allan Guzman as Miguel
- Elvis Gutierrez as Ronan
- Nikka Valencia as Edna
- Sheryl Cruz as Helga
- January Isaac as Mona
- Leandro Baldemor as Carlo

=== Guest cast ===
- Celine Lim as Young Angela
- Melzen Aquino as Young Almira
- Kimberly Fulgar as Rhodora
- Mary Roldan as Isabelle

== International broadcast ==
Country	Network	Title
Uganda	NTV	
Africa	MyTV	
United States	KIKU TV	Handful of Tears

== See also ==
- List of TV5 (Philippine TV network) original programming
