= Carlo J. Caparas' Bangis =

- Genre: Fantasy, drama
- Created by: TV5; Carlo J. Caparas
- Written by: Volta delos Santos, Benedict Mique, AD Ho
- Directed by: Topel Lee
- Starring: Oyo Boy Sotto; Danita Paner; BJ Go
- Opening theme: "Ako'y Kasama Mo" by Michael Renz Cortez
- Country of origin: Philippines
- Original language: Filipino
- No. of episodes: 65

Production
- Executive producer: Manuel V. Pangilinan
- Running time: 30 minutes

Original release
- Network: TV5
- Release: July 4 – September 30, 2011

Carlo J. Caparas' Bangis (lit. 'Ferocity') is a 2011 Philippine television drama series broadcast by TV5. Directed by Topel Lee, it stars Oyo Boy Sotto, Danita Paner, BJ Go and Anjo Yllana. It aired from July 4 to September 30, 2011, and was replaced by Sa Ngalan ng Ina.

== Plot ==
The story starts with Eboy, along with his parents Eman and Josie and adopted pet/brother giant crocodile Bangis, lives on an island barangay infamous for a legend of gigantic crocodiles and magic. One day, Don Serpente, the greedy, ambitious richest man of a municipality who has a jurisdiction on the island, wants the island as his source of income by making the area a mine project, much to the opposition of Eman and others. He, along with Josie, was killed by his henchmen. The villagers, fearing a boy named Eboy was among the dead and devoured by the crocodiles, was revealed to be alive, thanks to his brother crocodile. Alone, an orphan and no one to lean on, he became a wanderer. While some villagers and some opposition to the project were killed, seemingly devoured by other giant crocodiles, Eboy's suspected brother, later revealed to be done by Serpente's henchman Musang, Baktin's step-father, and a crocodile trainer, who also has a giant black crocodile. Katkat, Serpente's daughter, became friends with ironic Eboy, until the revelation. Baktin's loss, paired by Musang's abuse, caused her mother to lose her sanity.

Meanwhile, a veteran wildlife hunter named Leon was after Bangis just for revenge for his father's death, caused by Serpente's crocodiles. He fell in love in Eboy's teacher Maya. While Josie, alive and contracted amnesia after the incident and under the care of Serpente's business partner. She regains her memories after she saw her son.

Leon later got Eboy and Bangis under his scope. But he changed his mind later on in the series. A mining project led by Serpente, set as a front for retrieving a mysterious power, starts. It is up to Leon, Eboy, Bangis, and an ancient, white crocodile, that acts as the guardian of the island, to prevent Serpente's plan that may have disastrous consequences.

In the last episode, Serpente claims the orb, revealed as the island's heart and core, corrupting it with his greed. The island corrupted, the animals became rabid, the land becomes barren and inhospitable, and its people were turned into mindless zombies. But the orb's power is too much for him. He was absorbed, along with his mistress, Musang, and other henchmen. It is up to Leon to sacrifice himself to negate the corruption of the orb by absorbing his body into it, as he was pure in the eyes of the orb. But Josie, mortally wounded during the commotion, chose to sacrifice herself due to her love to her son.

In the end, Eboy, Katkat and Baktin, all orphans, became friends with Bangis, the killer crocodile and the guardian crocodile, the Barangay Chairman is running for mayoralty, Leon continues to court the teacher, and the orb, seemingly pure again and intact on the place, shines like a star, a constant change.

== Cast ==
=== Main cast ===
- Oyo Boy Sotto as Leon Aguila
- Danita Paner as Maya
- BJ Go as Eboy
- Anjo Yllana as Voice Of Bangis

=== Supporting cast ===
- Yul Servo as Don Dominador Serpente Jr.
- Danny Javier as Lolo Wago
- Tessie Tomas as Mama Mia
- Miriam Quiambao as Josie
- Wendy Valdez as Savanna Serpente
- Bayani Agbayani as Chairman Shepperd
- Marissa Sanchez as Bb. Tiririt
- Rodjun Cruz as Musang
- Katherine Luna as Magdalena
- Felix Roco as Alamid
- CJ Caparas as Falcon
- Junevee as Douglas
- Mavi Lozano as Puma Serpente
- Jazz Ocampo as Tweety
- Junyka Santarin as Katkat
- Gerald Pesigan as Baktin
- Nonie Buencamino as Don Aguila

== See also ==
- List of TV5 (Philippine TV network) original programming
