= Indecent Professor =

Philippine comedy film

- Official movie poster
- Directed by: Felix E. Dalay
- Screenplay by: Eduardo Mia; Ely Matawaran
- Story by: Eduardo Mia
- Produced by: William Leary
- Starring: Leo Martinez; Marjorie Barretto
- Cinematography: Ramon Marcelino
- Edited by: Renato de Leon
- Music by: Ricky del Rosario
- Production company: Falcon Films
- Distributed by: Falcon Films
- Release date: August 31, 1995
- Running time: 95 minutes
- Country: Philippines
- Language: Filipino

Indecent Professor is a 1995 Philippine comedy film directed by Felix E. Dalay. The film stars Leo Martinez in the title role.

== Plot ==
Professor Aristotle Morpheus is well-revered in the university he is working for except for one thing: he is unable to resist having sexual excursions with his female students. So when one student files a sexual harassment case against him, he turns to his co-professor Atty. Fernando Gorospe to help him win the case.

== Cast ==
Main cast

- Leo Martinez as Prof. Aristotle Morpheus
- Marjorie Barretto as Margarita Antonio
- Amanda Page as Ana Antonio

Supporting cast

- Jessica Maria Rodriguez as Leona Katigbak
- Danny "Brownie" Punzalan as Mario Palma
- Rico J. Puno as Atty.Fernando Gorospe
- Mely Tagasa as Atty. Honorata Morata
- Subas Herrero as Eusebio Holmes
- Carmi Martin as Dra. Holmes
- Paquito Diaz as Mr. Sonata
- Errol Dionisio as Prof. Tomas Mañalas
- Michelle Parton as Student
- Rufa Mae Quinto as Student
- Anna Bautista as Student
- Glydel Mercado as Prof. Liberata
