= Pagpag 24/7 =

2024 Philippine horror comedy film

- Theatrical release poster
- Directed by: JR Reyes
- Written by: Bel Ilag
- Story by: Erwin Blanco
- Produced by: Erwin Blanco; Vincent Del Rosario III; Veronique Del Rosario-Corpus
- Starring: Jerald Napoles; Nicco Manalo; Danita Paner; Nikko Natividad; Wilbert Ross
- Cinematography: Tom Redoble
- Edited by: Noah Tonga
- Music by: Jessie Lasaten
- Production companies: Mavx Production; Viva Films
- Distributed by: Netflix; Viva Films
- Release date: March 20, 2024
- Running time: 130 minutes
- Country: Philippines
- Language: Filipino

Pagpag 24/7 is a 2024 Philippine comedy horror film from the story of Erwin Blanco written by Bel Ilag and directed by JR Reyes. It stars Jerald Napoles, Nicco Manalo, Danita Paner, Nikko Natividad and Wilbert Ross. The film is about two friends bungled a heist that landed one of them in jail. Now they're haunted by the restless spirits from the store they tried to rob.

The film was released in Netflix on July 9, 2024, and it debuted at the number 1 spot on Netflix's top 10 movies in the Philippines and it stays at number 1 spot for one week.

== Plot ==
Mitoy and Boying are best friends but are also complete opposites. Mitoy is the cautious good guy, while Boying is the reckless rule breaker. Childhood buddies and brothers for life, they are two peas in a pod who always have each other’s backs. But all that changes when Mitoy and Boying are caught committing a crime at a convenience store, and only Mitoy is put behind bars despite Boying being the mastermind.

The once close friends grow apart, and Mitoy blames Boying for all his mishaps in life. They got the chance to reunite again after Mitoy’s time in jail and become coworkers at a funeral parlor. To life’s irony, they also somehow switched attitudes - Mitoy becomes the badass, and Boying is now the nice guy.

One fateful night, Mitoy, Boying, and some unfortunate people find themselves stranded at the same convenience store that brought nightmares to Mitoy and Boying’s lives. And though the store has a renovated modern look, it still holds the ghost of past crimes and a few other abandoned souls who seek payback and await to haunt poor victims.

== Cast ==
- Jerald Napoles as Mitoy
- Nicco Manalo as Boying
- Danita Paner as Leah / Lena
- Nikko Natividad as Pio
- Wilbert Ross as Jimboy
- Dindo Arroyo as Mang Kanor
- Maricor Canlas
- Star Orjaliza
- Butchoy Ubaldo
- Jyra De Guzman

== Release ==
The film was released nationwide on March 20, 2024, under Viva Films. The film was released in Netflix on July 9, 2024.

== Reception ==
The movie received a score of 46/100 from 7 reviews according to review aggregator website Kritikultura, indicating generally mixed reviews.

Stephanie Mayo of Daily Tribune gave the film a rating of 3 out of 5 and wrote; It’s truly the comedy that propels Pagpag 24/7. You could imagine the writers of the movie laughing out loud while penning the script. That’s the thing — Pagpag 24/7 does not take itself too seriously, hence the humor feels easy. It’s unpretentious and does not try to be more than its flimsy script. It’s enjoying itself — flaws and all — for the heck of it.

Goldwin Reviews gave the film a rating of 0 out 5 and wrote; Makaluma ang atake sa mga eksena. Hindi okay ang mga transition at visual effects. Mukhang peke ang store. Pero hindi naman seryoso ang buong pelikula kaya hindi na rin ito mahalaga.
