= P.O.5 =

2010–11 Philippine defunct television musical variety show

- Also known as: Party on Five
- Genre: Variety show
- Created by: TV5 Network
- Developed by: TV5 Entertainment Division
- Directed by: Rich Ilustre
- Presented by: Various Hosts and Performers
- Opening theme: "P.O.5 Theme Song"
- Ending theme: "P.O.5 Theme Song"
- Country of origin: Philippines
- Original language: Tagalog
- No. of episodes: 46

Production
- Running time: 2 hours

Original release
- Network: TV5
- Release: April 11, 2010 – February 20, 2011

Related
- Sunday Noontime Live!

P.O.5 (Party on Five) is a Philippine television variety show broadcast by TV5. Hosted by Lucy Torres-Gomez, Richard Gomez, John Estrada, Mr. Fu, Wilma Doesnt, Tuesday Vargas, Morissette, it aired from April 11, 2010 to February 20, 2011, and was replaced by Fan*tastik.

== Hosts ==
=== Main ===
- Lucy Torres-Gomez
- Richard Gomez
- John Estrada
- Mr. Fu
- Wilma Doesnt
- Tuesday Vargas
- Morissette

=== Performers ===
- Lani Misalucha
- JC de Vera
- Danita Paner
- Alex Gonzaga
- Jasmine Curtis-Smith
- Kean Cipriano
- Rainier Castillo
- Jon Avila
- IC Mendoza
- Carla Humphries
- Mara Alberto
- Lucky Mercado
- Jan Nieto
- Gloc-9
- Jay Durias (Musical Director)
- Rufa Mi
- Gerald Santos
- Wendy Valdez
- Princess Ryan
- Mocha Uson
- Leah Patricio
- Apple Chiu
- Frenchie Dy
- Yana Asistio
- Andrew Wolf
- Chesster Chay
- Keanna Reeves

=== Retsu & Dancing Models ===
- Retsu
- Marj Cornillez
- Sara Custodio
- Wen Santos
- Mira Baino
- Raine Larrazabal
- Gemma Gatdula
- Jayna Reyes
- Sheena Sy
- Bambi Del Rosario
- Joy Pagurayan
- Elf Stehr
- Jen Olivar
- Rina Lorilla
- Grendel Alvarado

== Studios ==
- KB Entertainment Studios (April 11 to October 10, 2010)
- Westside Studio, Broadway Centrum (October 17, 2010 to February 20, 2011)

== See also ==
- List of TV5 (Philippine TV network) original programming
