= Cara y Cruz: Walang Sinasanto =

Philippine action comedy film

Cara Y Cruz: Walang Sinasanto
- Directed by: Jun Aristorenas
- Written by: Henry Nadong
- Produced by: William Leary
- Starring: Raymart Santiago; Dennis Padilla
- Cinematography: Ramon Marcelino; Sergio Lobo
- Edited by: Renato de Leon
- Music by: Nonong Buencamino
- Production company: Viva Films
- Distributed by: Viva Films
- Release date: March 6, 1996
- Running time: 105 minutes
- Country: Philippines
- Language: Filipino

Cara Y Cruz: Walang Sinasanto is a 1996 Philippine action comedy film directed by Jun Aristorenas. The film stars Raymart Santiago and Dennis Padilla.

The film is streaming online on YouTube.

== Plot ==
Berting (Raymart), a convict who was a former seminarian, escapes from prison and takes hostage of Boggart (Dennis), a cab driver. After a series of events, they land in a primitive island where its inhabitants are controlled by a religious cult led by Tata Negro (Efren).

== Cast ==
- Raymart Santiago as Berting
- Dennis Padilla as Boggart
- Jun Aristorenas as Don Sebastian
- Efren Reyes Jr. as Tata Negro
- Donita Rose as Belen
- Amanda Page as Hilda
- Perla Bautista as Aling Ason
- Errol Dionisio as Bankero
- Glydel Mercado as Berting's Girl
- Ana Bautista as Provincial Bar Girl
- Junar Aristorenas as Ador

== Production ==
Production of the film took several months in 1995. At one point, Jun Aristorenas was taken ill, causing some delays in production. The film was slated to be released sometime in November that year, but was reportedly shelved. It was finally released in March 1996.
