= Sana Dalawa ang Puso Ko =

1994 drama film by Laurice Guillen

- Official movie poster
- Directed by: Laurice Guillen
- Screenplay by: Joen Chionglo
- Story by: Laurice Guillen; Joen Chionglo
- Produced by: William C. Leary
- Starring: Dina Bonnevie; Alice Dixson; Rustom Padilla
- Cinematography: Eduardo Jacinto
- Edited by: Efren Jarlego
- Music by: Nonong Buencamino
- Production companies: Viva Films; GMA Network
- Distributed by: Viva Films
- Release date: July 27, 1994
- Running time: 95 minutes
- Country: Philippines
- Language: Filipino

Sana Dalawa ang Puso Ko (transl. I Wish My Heart Was Two) is a 1994 Philippine drama film co-written and directed by Laurice Guillen. The film stars Dina Bonnevie, Alice Dixson and Rustom Padilla. It is named after Bodjie's Law of Gravity's hit song from their 1992 album Kamandag.

== Cast ==
- Dina Bonnevie as Susan
- Alice Dixson as Isabel
- Rustom Padilla as Gabriel
- Tonton Gutierrez as Dan
- Raquel Pareño as Sandy
- Mandy Ochoa as Manny
- Gloria Romero as Rose
- Charito Solis as Emily
- Romeo Rivera as Isabel's Father
- Pocholo Montes as Dr. Soler
- Ernie Zarate as Judge
- Marissa De Guzman as Minda

== Production ==
The film began production in 1993 with Dina Bonnevie, Nanette Medved and Cesar Montano originally part of the cast and Danny Zialcita initially at the helm. However, halfway through production, Nanette and Cesar backed out, with the former due to scheduling conflicts and the latter choosing to work on Alyas Waway, and Danny was taken ill. As a result, the film was shelved.

In April the following year, production of the film was revived, this time with Laurice Guillen at the helm and Alice Dixson and Rustom Padilla taking over the roles of Nanette and Cesar respectively. At one point, Laurice was hospitalized, putting production on hold for a couple of weeks.

== Awards ==
Year	Awards	Category	Recipient	Result	Ref.
1995	6th YCC Awards	Best Achievement in Sound and Aural Orchestration	Nonong Buencamino; Ramon Reyes	Won	
1995	6th YCC Awards	Best Film	Sana Dalawa ang Puso Ko	Nominated	
1995	6th YCC Awards	Best Screenplay	Laurice Guillen; Joen Chionglo	Nominated	
1995	6th YCC Awards	Best Achievement in Cinematography and Visual Design	Eduardo Jacinto; Edgar Martin Littaua	Nominated	
1995	6th YCC Awards	Best Performance	Dina Bonnevie	Nominated	
