= Karel Marquez =

Filipina actress, VJ, model and singer

Karel Marquez-Fariñas
- Born: Karla Ysabel Marquez; December 21, 1986 (age 39); Manila, Philippines
- Years active: 2001–present
- Spouse: Sean Fariñas (m. 2016)
- Children: 5

Karla Ysabel Marquez-Fariñas (born December 21, 1986), professionally known as Karel Marquez-Fariñas, is a Filipina actress, model, singer, and TV host who's currently signed under manager, Becky Aguila since July 2017. Before she joined GMA Network, she was part of ABS-CBN's Talent Management & Development Center (known as Star Magic). She was Star Magic's Batch 10 alumna. Today, she is a freelance artist and entrepreneur.

== Career ==
Marquez started as VJ in Myx, a subsidiary of ABS-CBN, in 2003. She was transferred to ABS-CBN's rival network, GMA Network, despite being a VJ in Myx until 2007. She starred in GMA's afternoon Philippine television drama Pati Ba Pintig Ng Puso?. She was also a mainstay in GMA's Sunday variety program SOP. She hosted a segment in GMA's gag show Bitoy's Funniest Videos, titled "Just 4 Kikays". She co-starred in GMA's primetime Zaido: Pulis Pangkalawakan, as Lyka. She was one-half of the cover girls in the November 2006 edition of FHM Philippines. Marquez, alongside Drew Arellano, was also a co-host in Coca-Cola: Ride To Fame, a reality talent show. She was also a radio DJ.

She starred in GMA's Philippine television drama My Husband's Lover.

== Personal life ==
Marquez's first relationship (ex-boyfriend) was with Arman de Guzman, with whom she had two children, Keiley and Kyler. Marquez began dating Sean Fariñas in January 2012. They became engaged on May 6, 2016, and got married on December 1, 2016.

== Filmography ==
=== Television/digital series ===
Year	Title	Role
2001–2003	Magandang Tanghali Bayan	Herself
2002–2004	Berks	Penelope
2003	Maalaala Mo Kaya: Garapon	
2003–2007	Myx	Herself / Former VJ
2004–2009	Bitoy's Funniest Videos	Herself
2006	Mga Anghel na Walang Langit	Jane
2006	Komiks: Da Adventures of Pedro Penduko	Ruwanna
2007	Sine Novela: Pati Ba Pintig ng Puso?	Agatha
2007	Mga Kwento ni Lola Basyang: Ang Palasyo ng mga Duwende	Lota
2007	Zaido: Pulis Pangkalawakan	Lyka
2010	SOP	Herself
2010	Pidol's Wonderland	Arwana
2011	Babaeng Hampaslupa	Fake Elizabeth Wong / Stephanie
2011	Real Confessions: Mga Pinutol na Pangarap	Maricel Apatan
2011	Sa Ngalan ng Ina	Carmela Illustre
2011	Regal Shocker: Salamin	Sophie
2011	Mistaken Identity	Princess Violeta
2011–2012	Glamorosa	Young Claudia Montesilva-Herrera
2012	Isang Dakot Na Luha	Bernadette
2012	Maalaala Mo Kaya: Stuffed Toy	Winnie
2012	Yesterday's Bride	Dra. Sabrina Torres
2013	My Husband's Lover	Evelyn Agatep
2013	Cassandra: Warrior Angel	Louella
2014	Ang Lihim ni Annasandra	Cecilia
2016	Ika-6 na Utos	Lara Salcedo-Fuentabella
2017	Tadhana	Sunny
2017	La Luna Sangre	Nisha Echavez
2018	Contessa	Virginia "Gigi" Palaroan
2020	Paano ang Pasko?	Karen Dominante Cruz
2021	Paano ang Pangako?	Karen Dominante Cruz
2021	Stories from the Heart: The End of Us	Wendy Corpuz
2022	Return to Paradise	Dindi Sta. Maria
2024	Black Rider	Carmen

=== Film ===
- Otso-Otso Pamela Mela Wan (2004)
- Close to You (2006)
- Tiyanaks (2007)

== Awards and nominations ==
Year	Work	Organization	Category	Result	Source
2004		Aliw Awards	Best New Artist (Female)	Won	
