= Babaeng Hampaslupa =

- Also known as: The Poor Heiress 女游民
- Genre: Soap opera
- Created by: TV5 Network
- Directed by: Eric Quizon; Joyce Bernal
- Starring: Alex Gonzaga; Susan Roces; Alice Dixson
- Opening theme: "Ikaw Lang ang Mamahalin" by Faith Cuneta
- Country of origin: Philippines
- Original languages: Filipino; Southern Min
- No. of episodes: 113

Production
- Executive producer: Manuel V. Pangilinan
- Production locations: Malabon, Philippines
- Running time: 30-45 minutes

Original release
- Network: TV5
- Release: February 7 – July 15, 2011

Babaeng Hampaslupa (International Name: The Poor Heiress / lit. 'dirt poor woman'; simplified Chinese: 女游民; traditional Chinese: 女遊民; pinyin: Nǚ yóumín) is a 2011 Philippine television drama series broadcast by TV5. Directed by Eric S. Quizon and Joyce Bernal, it stars Susan Roces, Alice Dixson and Alex Gonzaga. It aired from February 7 to July 15, 2011, replacing My Driver Sweet Lover and was replaced by Rod Santiago's The Sisters.

The timeslot was changed through the April 2011 season to 9pm; the original time the series was normally shown was 8:30pm, and it moved up to 9:00-9:30pm after its primetime suspense series Mga Nagbabagang Bulaklak on its primetime block.

== Story ==
Babaeng Hampaslupa tells the story of two clans, the Wongs and the Sees. A modern-day fairytale set on the boundaries between the Filipino and Chinese community.

Three generations of women tell a story and cope in the inner strength in the eyes of their faiths looking for love, respect, power, and self happiness.

The story also chronicles on lost loves between Helena See (Susan Roces) and George Wong (Freddie Webb) and the powerful manipulative Edward Wong (Eddie Garcia). The soap also shows flashbacks of young Helena See (Sheryl Cruz) with the Wong brothers, young George Wong (Mico Palanca) and young Edward Wong (Bernard Palanca).

The powerful love between Anastacia See/Diana Wong (Alice Dixson) and Charles Wong (Jay Manalo) and the vindictive Katarina Manansala Wong (Bing Loyzaga), Charles' manipulative wife turned ex in his perspective and Harry Bautista (Wendell Ramos), the newfound love in Anastacia/Diana's life.

And the eternal love between Grace/Elizabeth (Alex Gonzaga) whose life eternally unfolds in her fate, as she will learn betrayal and love between Nato (Alwyn Uytingco) and Andrew (Martin Escudero).

But between all their trials and tribulations they will face, who will they truly love and be with in the end of all their success?

== Cast ==
=== Main cast ===
- Alex Gonzaga as Grace Mallari / Elizabeth Wong / Grace Elizabeth Wong / Grace Elizabeth Wong See
- Susan Roces as Helena See / Helena See Wong
- Alice Dixson as Diana Wong / Anastacia See

=== Supporting cast ===
- Freddie Webb as George Wong
- Eddie Garcia as Edward Wong / Edward Qua
- Jay Manalo as Charles Wong
- Bing Loyzaga as Katarina Wong / Katarina Manansala
- Martin Escudero as Andrew See
- Alwyn Uytingco as Renato "Nato" Ramirez
- Karel Marquez as Stephanie Manansala / Elizabeth Wong (impostor)
- Christian Vasquez as William Wong
- Shiela Marie Rodriguez as Margaret Wong
- Marita Zobel as Elizabeth Wong
- Celso Ad. Castillo as Master Ming
- Susan Africa as Epiphania "Epang" Mallari
- Anne Villegas as Dora
- Julio Diaz as Tomas Mallari
- Jenny Quizon as Josephine Perez
- Dolphy Jr. as Manuel Ramirez
- Piper Mishalucha as Yvonne

=== Extended cast ===
- Wendell Ramos as Harry Bautista
- Eric Quizon as Atty. Jefferson Go
- Carlos Morales as Jong Delos Santos
- Joross Gamboa as Phillip Cheng

=== Special participation ===
- Sheryl Cruz as young Helena See
- Bernard Palanca as young Edward Wong
- Miko Palanca† as young George Wong

== Characters ==
=== Wong family ===
- Grace Mallari/Elizabeth Wong/Grace Elizabeth Wong
- George Wong
- Edward Wong
- Charles Wong
- Katarina Wong / Katarina Manansala
- Stephanie / Elizabeth Wong (impostor)
- William Wong
- Margaret Wong
- Elizabeth Wong (George Wong's first child from first wife)
- Emerson Wong

=== See family ===
- Helena See
- Diana Wong/Anastacia See
- Andrew See

== Soundtrack ==
The following song is the main song in the series:

- "Ikaw Lang ang Mamahalin" - Babaeng Hampaslupa's official theme, performed by Faith Cuneta.
- Dubbed to be the best series ever that TV5 produced and the first teledrama offering in the first quarter of 2011.
- This series is shot at the Hwa Chong Temple in Malabon, Philippines.

== Syndication ==
Philippines: Fox Filipino

== International broadcast ==
| Country | Network | Title |
|---|---|---|
| United States | KIKU TV | The Poor Heiress |
| Kenya | NTV | The Poor Heiress |

== Trivia ==
- The series reran from May 26 to July 11, 2025, and replaced the rerun of Sa Ngalan ng Ina at the 4:45 PM to 5:30 PM timeslot.and was replaced by Cine Cinco sa Hapon

== See also ==
- List of TV5 (Philippine TV network) original programming
