= To Saudi with Love =

Philippine drama film

- Directed by: Emmanuel Borlaza
- Screenplay by: Lualhati Bautista
- Story by: Rey Langit
- Produced by: Robert F. Ylagan
- Starring: Dawn Zulueta; Alice Dixson; Carmi Martin
- Cinematography: Sergio Lobo
- Edited by: Jess Navarro
- Music by: Nonong Buencamino
- Production company: Premiere Entertainment Productions
- Distributed by: Premiere Entertainment Productions
- Release date: June 20, 1996
- Running time: 100 minutes
- Country: Philippines
- Language: Filipino

To Saudi with Love is a 1996 Philippine drama film directed by Emmanuel Borlaza. Based on the radio program of the same name hosted by Rey Langit, the film stars Dawn Zulueta, Alice Dixson and Carmi Martin. It was one of the entries in the 1996 Manila Film Festival.

== Cast ==
- Dawn Zulueta as Cynthia
- Alice Dixson as Mithi
- Carmi Martin as Purita
- Tonton Gutierrez as Allan
- Mat Ranillo III as Eric
- Rey PJ Abellana as Ruel
- Richard Bonnin as Bono
- Daniel Fernando as Abel
- Rey Langit as Himself
- Jinky Oda as Margarita
- Carol Dauden as Salud Manlongal
