= My Driver Sweet Lover =

- Genre: Romance, Comedy, Drama
- Created by: Associated Broadcasting Company
- Directed by: Eric S. Quizon; Soxie H. Topacio
- Starring: JC de Vera; Danita Paner; Arci Muñoz
- Music by: Mon Del Rosario
- Opening theme: "I Love You Boy" by Danita Paner
- Country of origin: Philippines
- Original language: Filipino
- No. of episodes: 74

Production
- Executive producer: Manuel V. Pangilinan
- Running time: 30 minutes

Original release
- Network: TV5
- Release: October 25, 2010 – February 4, 2011

My Driver Sweet Lover is a Philippine television drama series broadcast by TV5. Directed by Eric S. Quizon and Soxie H. Topacio, it stars by JC de Vera, Danita Paner and Arci Muñoz. It aired from October 25, 2010 to February 4, 2011, and was replaced by Babaeng Hampaslupa.

== Plot ==
Rocky (JC de Vera) is a jeepney driver whose charm and street smart background often leave all the girls hooked, except for his usual enemy, Gabrielle (Danita Paner), a cranky and workaholic hotel heiress. The history of fighting cat and dog began in an orphanage—a young Rocky was abandoned by his father; while Gabrielle was an obese, lost squire who was brought there after an attempted kidnap to steal her inheritance. But when Gabrielle was accidentally reunited with her family, the two had lost contact until they crossed paths at present. Separated by fate, their gap grows wider through an intense dislike and a yawning divide brought by class and money. The cunning Monique (Arci Muñoz) makes Gabrielle's life even more difficult as she pulls everything to steal Rocky from her.

== Cast ==
=== Main cast ===
- JC de Vera as Rocky
- Danita Paner as Gabrielle "Gaby" Barrinuevo
- Arci Muñoz as Monique

=== Supporting cast ===
- Richard Gomez as Delfin/Akmhedd Alfaruk
- Pilita Corrales as Maximiliana "Abuela Maxi" Barrinuevo
- Dina Bonnevie as Araceli Barrinuevo
- Eric Quizon as Aaron Barrinuevo
- Eddie Gutierrez as Lolo George
- Nova Villa as Aling White
- Ramon Christopher as Mang Tisoy
- BJ Forbes as Bert Ngisi
- Meg Imperial as Millet
- Chris Pasturan as Asyong Afro
- Mura as Boy Baldado
- Ruby Rodriguez as Yaya Tabs
- Epy Quizon as Jimrod
- Yayo Aguila as Yaya Auring
- Keempee de Leon as Von
- Tom Rodriguez as Simon/Ricky
- Carla Humphries as Coleen
- Alyanna Asistio as Trisha
- JR de Guzman as Ned
- Cai Cortez as Minnie
- Krystel Goodwin as France

=== Extended cast ===
- Carmi Martin as Ms. Horinda
- Liza Lorena as Helga Solis (Aracelli's Mother)
- Eva Darren as Sor Aguida
- Chelsea Eugenio as Bea/young Gaby
- Julius Gareza as Randy/young Rocky
- Joko Diaz as Agent Castro
- Vince Izon as Hector
- Joaqui Tupaz as Procopio
- Mon Confiado as Cyrus Delo Tavo

== See also ==
- List of TV5 (Philippine TV network) original programming
