= Nikko Natividad =

Filipino actor, model and dancer (born 1993)

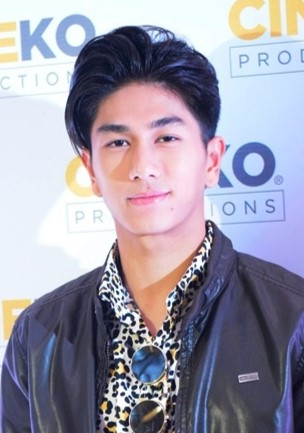
- Natividad in 2017
- Born: Nicholai Seagal Natividad; February 13, 1993 (age 33); Malolos, Bulacan, Philippines
- Occupations: Model, actor, dancer
- Years active: 2014–present
- Agents: Star Magic (2014–2022); Viva Artists Agency (2022–present); GMA Network (2024–present); ALLTV2 (2024–present)
- Known for: Nikko, #Nikko
- Height: 1.70 m (5 ft 7 in)
- Spouse: Cielo Mae Eusebio (m. 2021)
- Children: 1

Nicholai Seagal Natividad (born February 13, 1993) is a Filipino model, actor and dancer, who became popular after winning ABS-CBN's noontime variety show It's Showtime's Gandang Lalake segment. He is also known as one of the members of #Hashtags of the same noontime variety show.

== Early life ==
Natividad was born and raised in the city of Malolos in the province of Bulacan. He was a waiter who won the Gandang Lalake, Kumakareer segment of It's Showtime and appeared on several TV shows of ABS-CBN. He then joined the boy group in the Philippines, the '#Hashtags'.

== Career ==
=== Pinoy Big Brother ===
In July 2016, he was selected as one of the housemates of the 7th season of Pinoy Big Brother as a 2-in-1 housemate with McCoy de Leon. Inside the house, he admitted being a father to a child out of marriage. He was also chosen to be the Most Valuable Housemate in his stay at the house. They were hailed as the 6th Lucky Big Placer.

== Personal life ==
Natividad married Cielo Mae Eusebio on October 31, 2021. They started dating around 2014 and had a child prior to their marriage.In February 2026, a sex tape involving Natividad surfaced. Natividad admitted that the video was authentic and anticipated that the video, taken in 2022, would eventually surface. Natividad's wife, while acknowledging that said video has affected their relationship, stated that she has decided to remain with her husband.

== Filmography ==
=== Film ===
Year	Title	Role
2018	Bakwit Boys	Philip
2018	The Hopeful Romantic	Ross
2019	Papa Pogi	Tony
2023	Salamat Daks	Nikko Cutie
2024	Pagpag 24/7 '	Pio
2024	I Am Not Big Bird	Macky

=== Television ===
Year	Title	Role
2014; 2015–2021	It's Showtime	Himself Gandang Lalake Grand Winner/ #Hashtag dancer-member Main stay Co-Host / Online Host
2016	Tonight with Boy Abunda	Himself
2016	Pinoy Big Brother: Lucky 7	Himself/Housemate
2016	Magandang Buhay	Himself
2016	Gandang Gabi Vice	Himself
2017–2018	Hanggang Saan	Samboy
2018	FPJ's Ang Probinsyano	Bong
2018–2020	Kadenang Ginto	Gino Bartolome
2020	Ipaglaban Mo: Ungol	Renzo
2020	Paano Kita Mapasasalamatan?	Allan Diaz
2021	Init sa Magdamag	Simon
2022	Misis Piggy	
2023	Kurdapya	Tadeo
2023	Cattleya Killer	Nonoy Eightball
2024	FPJ's Batang Quiapo	Emong Fortun-Zaballa
2025	Lolong: Bayani ng Bayan	BHudas
2025	Incognito	Lucio
2026	Wish Ko Lang: Nakamamatay na Pag-Ibig	Jayson Zoleta
2026	Sigabo	Binoy

=== Microdrama ===
Year	Title	Role
2026	Bedroom 88	

=== Music ===
#Hashtags released their first self-titled album on May 21, 2016. The album contains six tracks with their carrier single 'Roadtrip'.
