= Alice Dixson =

Filipino actress (born 1969)

- Born: Jessie Alice Celones Dixson; July 28, 1969 (age 57); Coral Gables, Florida, U.S.
- Citizenship: United States; Philippines
- Occupations: Actress; model
- Spouse: Ronnie Miranda (m. 1999; div. 2013)
- Children: 2
- Beauty pageant titleholder
- Title: Binibining Pilipinas International 1986
- Years active: 1986–2006; 2010–present
- Major competitions: Binibining Pilipinas 1986; (Winner – Binibining Pilipinas International 1986); Miss International 1986; (Top 15)
- Website: http://www.alicedixson.com

Jessie Alice Celones Dixson (Note: Although born in the United States, Alice Dixson still possesses her mother's maiden name (Celones) as is the convention in the Philippines as indicated on her birth record.) (Tagalog: [ˈalis ˈdiksɔn]; born July 28, 1969) or often misspelled Alice Dixon, is an American-born Filipino actress, commercial model and beauty queen who was crowned Binibining Pilipinas International 1986 and represented the Philippines at the Miss International 1986 competition in Nagasaki, Japan where she finished in the top 15.

== Biography ==
Born to a Filipino mother and an American father, Dixson was the Philippines' representative to the Miss International 1986 competition, and later on became a household name in 1987 through a Palmolive soap TV commercial where she sang the phrase "I can feel it!". After joining a talent contest in Eat Bulaga! and Binibining Pilipinas, her show business career started with the role of Faye, a fairy princess, who fell in love with an earthling in Okay Ka, Fairy Ko!. At the time, Eat Bulaga! was airing on RPN, and one of its hosts, Vic Sotto, requested her to be part of the TV series (he is the owner of M-Zet Productions that produced Okay Ka, Fairy Ko!). After she ended her appearance in that sitcom series, she appeared in her self-titled weekly anthology series Alice, produced by Regal Television and co-produced and aired by GMA Network.

In January 2011, she returned to show business via Babaeng Hampaslupa which aired on TV5. This was succeeded with Glamorosa, Isang Dakot na Luha (2012), Enchanted Garden (2012) and two movies Ang Panday 2 (2011) and Just One Summer (2012). Her next TV series is Never Say Goodbye which airs in January 2013 on TV5.

Dixson is a licensed realtor in the province of British Columbia, Canada and also a licensed real estate agent in Florida.

Dixson is also known for her best actress roles in many Viva Films productions such as Hanggang Saan, Hanggang Kailan (1993), Sa Isang Sulok ng Pangarap (1994, based on the popular comics series by RJ Nuevas), Pangako ng Kahapon (1994), Sana Dalawa ang Puso Ko (1995) and the all-star cast of the action film Silakbo (1995) with Cesar Montano, Joko Diaz, Anjanette Abayari and Marjorie Barretto. Dixson is also a film favorite when she was paired with Christopher de Leon in films like My Other Woman (1990), Bakit Ngayon Ka Lang (1994, OctoArts Films) and Pahiram Kahit Sandali (1999, Regal Films), which was an R-rated but critically acclaimed film because of both leading woman's portrayals by Dixson and Ara Mina, earning credit for director Maryo J. de los Reyes. She reunited with de Leon and leading man Richard Gomez in the hit telenovela Ang Iibigin ay Ikaw and its sequel, Ang Iibigin ay Ikaw Pa Rin.

In December 2013, she posed for FHM Philippines, making her the oldest woman to appear on the cover of that men's magazine, at age 44.

In 2015, she returned to GMA Network after her contract with TV5 expired to star in the remake of the hit 1994 telenovela, Marimar.

In 2017, she transferred back to her home network, ABS-CBN, and did Ang Probinsyano as an antagonist, Catherine Cabrera. In 2018, she played Stella Cortez, the series’ main villain who caused the death of Rodrigo and Rebecca in Ngayon at Kailanman.

In 2019, she returned to GMA Network through Madrasta and Beautiful Justice.

== Filmography ==
=== Film ===
Year	Title	Role
1987	Stolen Moments	Aida
1988	Bobo Cop	Louise
1988	Nagbabagang Luha	Cielo
1988	Sa Akin Pa Rin ang Bukas	Yasmin
1989	Isang Araw Walang Diyos	Emily Jacinto
1989	Hot Summer	
1989	Si Malakas at Si Maganda	Anna/Maganda
1989	Pulis, Pulis sa Ilalim ng Tulay	Anna
1989	Virginia P.	
1989	Last 2 Minutes	
1990	Dyesebel	Dyesebel
1990	My Other Woman	Mia Arriola
1990	Papa's Girl	
1990	Lover's Delight	
1991	Emma Salazar Case	Emma Salazar
1991	Onyong Majikero	
1991	Tatlong Maria	
1991	Underage Too	
1991	Joey Boy Munti, 15 Anyos Ka sa Muntunlupa	Lydia
1991	Love Ko si Ma'am	Beauty
1992	Sinungaling Mong Puso	Leda
1992	Kamay ni Cain	
1992	Boy Anghel: Utak Pulburon	Tina
1993	Hanggang Saan, Hanggang Kailan	Esther Ilustre
1993	Ang Boyfriend Kong Gamol	Marlene Smith
1993	Sa Isang Sulok ng Pangarap	Nimfa Gutierrez/Rosette Saavedra
1994	Bakit Ngayon Ka Lang	
1994	Pangako ng Kahapon	Mildred Tavera
1994	Walang Matigas na Tinapay sa Mainit na Kape	Tess
1994	Sana Dalawa ang Puso Ko	Isabel
1995	Silakbo	Barbara "Bang" Briones
1995	Okey si Ma'am	Sonia Marasigan
1995	Sana Dalawa ang Puso Ko	Isabel Mendoza
1995	Jessica Alfaro Story	Jessica Alfaro
1997	To Saudi with Love	
1998	Sambahin ang Ngalan Mo	Blanca
1998	Pahiram Kahit Sandali	Ada Castro
1999	Ganito Ako Magmahal	
2005	Enteng Kabisote 2: Okay Ka Fairy Ko: The Legend Continues	Ina Magenta
2006	Koi Suru Tomato ~Kumain Ka Na Ba~ Title in USA: Love Tomato	Christina
2011	Ang Panday 2	Ibira
2012	Just One Summer	Irene Luna-Cuaresma
2013	When the Love Is Gone	Audrey Luis
2014	Shake, Rattle & Roll XV	Lourdes
2015	Felix Manalo	Lilia
2017	The Ghost Bride	Angie Lao
2019	Nuuk	Elaisa Svendsen
2020	Suarez: The Healing Priest	Alice Marcelino
2023	Loyalista: The Untold Story of Imelda Papin	Imelda Marcos

=== Television ===
Year	Title	Role
1986	Eat Bulaga!	Herself
1987–1991	Okay Ka, Fairy Ko!	Faye
1991	Alice	"various"
1993	We Are Family	N/A
1991–2005	Maalaala Mo Kaya	Various roles
2002–2003	Ang Iibigin ay Ikaw	Mia Sandoval
2003	Ang Iibigin ay Ikaw Pa Rin	Mia Sandoval
2004	Hanggang Kailan	Thelma Villarama
2011	Babaeng Hampaslupa	Diana Wong / Anastacia See
2011–2012	Glamorosa	Dra. Paulina Valdez-Marciano
2012	Isang Dakot na Luha	Amelia San Diego / Amelis Reyes
2012–2013	Enchanted Garden	Diwani Alvera / Elaine Malforie
2013	Never Say Goodbye	Criselda Madrigal-Montecastro
2013–2014	For Love or Money	Kristine Almonte
2014	Confessions of a Torpe	Monique Salcedo
2015–2016	Marimar	Mia Corcuera-Aldama
2015	Magpakailanman: Paskong Malamig ang Puso	Grace
2018	FPJ's Ang Probinsyano	Catherine Versoza-Cabrera
2018–2019	Ngayon at Kailanman	Stella Simbajon-Cortes
2019	Beautiful Justice	Black Rose
2019	Madrasta	Angelina Cruz
2021	Legal Wives	Amirah Alonte
2022	First Lady	Ingrid Domingo
2023	Maging Sino Ka Man	Madam Claudette

== Awards, nominations, and achievements ==
- 2020 18th Gawad Tanglaw Film Acting Award for the movie "Nuuk" (winner)
- 2019 PMPC Star Awards for Television Best Supporting Actress nominee for "Ngayon at Kailanman" (nominee)
- 2018 2nd Eddys Awards Best Supporting Actress Nominee for the movie "The Ghost Bride" (nominee)
- 2018 34th Star Awards for Movies Best Supporting Actress Nominee for the movie "The Ghost Bride" (nominee)
- 2015 PEP Awards Female Star of the Night (winner)
- 2014 People Asia Woman of Substance and Style Awardee (winner)
- 2014 16th Gawad Pasado Awards PinakaPasadong Aktres (Best Actress) for the movie When the Love is Gone (winner)
- 1998 Metro Manila Film Festival Best Actress for the movie Sambahin Ang Ngalan Mo (winner)
- 1997 Metro Manila Film Festival Best Actress Nominee for the movie To Saudi With Love (nominee)
- 1987 Philippine Movie Press Club Award for Most Promising Star (winner)
- Creative Guild of Accredited Advertising Agencies Award of Recognition as Commercial Model Discovery of 1987 (winner)
- 1986 Semi-Finalists in the Miss International Pageant held in Nagasaki, Japan (semi-finalist)
- 1986 Binibining Pilipinas International (winner)

== Notes ==
Awards and achievements
Preceded by Sabrina Artadi	Binibining Pilipinas International; 1986	Succeeded by Lourdes Enriquez

Preceded by Danita Paner	FHM Cover Girl (December 2013)	Succeeded by Banana Split girls Jef Gaitan, Sunshine Garcia and Aiko Climaco
