= Mommy Elvie's Problematic Show =

- Genre: Comedy
- Created by: ABC Development Corporation
- Developed by: Idea Minds Inc.
- Starring: Elvie Villasanta; Ariel Villasanta
- Opening theme: "Problema na Naman" by Kiko Machine
- Country of origin: Philippines
- Original language: Filipino

Production
- Running time: 30 minutes

Original release
- Network: ABC 5
- Release: June 19, 2007 – August 5, 2008

Mommy Elvie's Problematic Show is a Philippine television sitcom series broadcast by ABC. Hosted by Ariel Villasanta and Elvie Villasanta, it aired from June 19, 2007 to August 5, 2008, and was replaced by 3R (Respect, Relax, Respond).

== Plot ==
Mommy Elvie wants to be famous before she turns 80 with the help of her son Ariel. The show comprised a show-within-a-show aspect. It also featured celebrity guests.

== Cast ==
- Elvie Villasanta
- Ariel Villasanta
- Nicole Hyala of 90.7 Love Radio

== Guests ==
- Kiko Machine
- Long Mejia

== Trivia ==
- Mommy Elvie also appeared in her son's former show, The Misadventures of Maverick and Ariel, that also aired on ABC.
- This show also aired worldwide on ABS-CBN's TFC on Kapamilya Channel.

== See also ==
- List of TV5 (Philippine TV network) original programming
