= S.O.S.: Stories of Survival =

Philippine reality-documentary television program

- Genre: Documentary
- Presented by: Martin Andanar
- Country of origin: Philippines
- Original language: Tagalog
- No. of seasons: 4

Production
- Running time: 60 minutes
- Production company: ABC News and Public Affairs

Original release
- Network: ABC
- Release: November 3, 2005 – August 4, 2008

S.O.S.: Stories of Survival is a Philippine television documentary show broadcast by ABC. Hosted by Martin Andanar, it aired from November 3, 2005, to August 4, 2008, and was replaced by Midnight DJ.

== Premise ==
The show features stories of natural disasters and survival tips for natural disasters.

== See also ==
- Anatomy of a Disaster - A similar show on GMA Network from 2010 until 2011.
- Hamon ng Kalikasan - A similar show on GMA News TV in 2012.
