= Danita Paner =

Filipino pop singer and actress

- Born: Rafaelita Danita Gomez Paner; April 2, 1989 (age 37); Manila, Philippines
- Genres: Pop rock
- Occupations: Singer, actress
- Instruments: Vocals, guitars
- Years active: 2006–present
- Label: VIVA Records

Rafaelita Danita Gomez Paner (born April 2, 1989) is a Filipino actress and former pop-rock singer. She is the daughter of former basketball player Manny Paner and actress Daisy Romualdez, and the sister of Kristina Paner and Karl Paner. She has an album produced by VIVA Records named Promotor. Paner made her debut teleserye appearance via TV5's My Driver Sweet Lover opposite JC de Vera. As of 2015, she has been seen on ABS-CBN.

== Early life and education ==
Paner was adopted by former basketball player Manny Paner and actress Daisy Romualdez. She has a sister, Kristina Paner, and a brother, Karl. As a baby, she had many skin diseases. At the age of 12, she performed with her sister at concerts, which put her on the path to becoming a singer. She studied at O.B. Montessori, Greenhills. There, she was part of an all-female band alongside Alyssa Gibbs (the daughter of Bing Loyzaga and Janno Gibbs) that performed alternative / pop rock music at school events. She also used to perform with Arci Muñoz. She also received voice training from Annie Quintos of The Company.

== Career ==
At a young age, Paner had some minor roles in the films Ang Pagbabalik ni Pedro Penduko, The Jessica Alfaro Story, and To Saudi with Love. She didn't do acting again for a long time until she played the daughter of Joel Torre's character in the biopic The Chavit Singson Story. During her high school years, she also did TV guestings, and served as the front act for some concerts.

At the age of 16, Paner started collaborating with Vehnee Saturno, a veteran songwriter. In 2007, at the age of 18, she launched her first album, Promotor. It contains 10 tracks which includes the songs "Lunod", "Kung Wala Na Nga", a cover of Prettier Than Pink's "Cool Ka Lang" and Rivermaya's "Himala".

In 2010, Paner transitioned to acting. After being managed by her mother for most of her career up to that point, her mother voluntarily quit as her manager and Anabelle Rama became her manager. After appearing on 2 episodes of 5 Star Specials, she was able to impress the executives at TV5, who cast her in the lead role of their first teleserye My Driver Sweet Lover alongside JC de Vera. She also hosted the Sunday show P.O.5 and the variety show Hey it's Saberdey! In 2011, she was cast in the lead role in Carlo J. Caparas' Bangis alongside Oyo Sotto and was cast in the drama series Isang Dakot Na Luha. By 2013, she got less acting assignments from the network. She was also on the cover of FHM that year for the November 2013 issue.

After her contract with TV5 expired, Paner signed with Viva Artists. In 2016, she started taking roles on ABS-CBN shows such as Ipaglaban Mo!, and Magpahanggang Wakas. She also did several films with Viva Films, including Miss Granny. In 2020, she returned to TV5 to take a villain role in the series Paano ang Pangako? However, due to COVID, she backed out before the final episodes were shot, with Adrianna So stepping into her role. She then appeared in the films Instant Daddy and Pagpag 24/7.

== Personal life ==
Paner is currently in a relationship with Ralph Ian Fernandez, a kagawad from Quezon City. She was previously in a relationship with Kean Cipriano, a member of the band Callalily, and with JC de Vera, her former costar.

When she was 18, there was a rift between her and her adoptive mother Daisy Romualdez. Paner claimed on an appearance on The Buzz that Romualdez had been verbally abusing her and wouldn't allow her to go to school. As a result, she ran away from home and called her experience "escaping from hell". As a result, subpoenas were issued by the NBI and the DSWD got involved. Eventually, they were able to apologize and resolve their issues.

== Filmography ==
=== Television ===
Year	Title	Role
2010	5 Star Specials	
2010	My Driver Sweet Lover	Gabrielle 'Gaby' Barrinuevo/Bea
2010	P.O.5	Herself / Host
2011	Fan*tastik	Herself
2011	Luv Crazy Presents: Love vs. Zombies	Zoey
2011–2012	Hey it's Saberdey!	Herself / Host
2011	Pidol's Wonderland: Poster Boy	Alyssa
2011	Maynila	Mia
2011	Star Confessions: Stigmata	Lalaine Bianca Lapus
2011	Carlo J. Caparas' Bangis	Maya
2012	Isang Dakot Na Luha	Angela San Diego
2014	Beki Boxer	Chloe
2016	Ipaglaban Mo: Sabik	Dang
2016	Ipaglaban Mo: Tiwala	Grace
2016	Maalaala Mo Kaya: Pole	Mitch
2016	ASAP	Herself / co-host / Performer
2016	Be My Lady	Monica
2016	Magpahanggang Wakas	Leila Asuncion
2017	Ipaglaban Mo: Pagkakasala	Roxanne
2017	La Luna Sangre	Lilia Agustin
2017	Eat Bulaga!	Herself/Bulagaan Olympics Contestant
2018	Ipaglaban Mo: Kadugo	Cary
2018	Precious Hearts Romances Presents: Los Bastardos	young Pilar Perez
2018	Maalaala Mo Kaya: Anting-anting	Mila
2019	Maalaala Mo Kaya: Family Portrait	Rosalyn "Anna" M. Angara
2019	Maalaala Mo Kaya: Kumelavoo	Kara
2020-2021	Paano ang Pasko?	Andi
2020-2021	Paano ang Pangako?	Andi
2024	Family Feud	Herself / Contestant

=== Film ===
Year	Title	Role
1994	Ang Pagbabalik ni Pedro Penduko	Marla
1995	The Jessica Alfaro Story	
1996	To Saudi with Love	
2003	The Chavit Singson Story	Anita
2014	Moron 5.2: The Transformation	Amor
2018	Miss Granny	Phoebe
2019	Just a Stranger	Kim
2023	Instant Daddy	Julie
2024	Pagpag 24/7	Leah / Lena

== Discography ==
=== Studio albums ===
List of studio albums by Danita Paner
Title	Album details
Promotor	Released: 2007; Label: Viva Records

Preceded by Bangs Garcia	FHM Cover Girl (November 2013)	Succeeded by Alice Dixson
