= Marjorie Barretto =

Filipino actress (born 1974)

Member of the Caloocan City Council
- In office June 30, 2007 – June 30, 2013
- Constituency: 2nd District

Personal details
- Born: Marjorie Bernadine Castelo Barretto; May 19, 1974 (age 52) Cebu City, Philippines
- Party: Nacionalista (2024–present)
- Other political affiliations: Independent (2013–2024); Liberal (2009–2013); Lakas (2007–2009)
- Spouse: Dennis Padilla (m. 1995; ann. 2009)
- Children: 5 (incl. Julia)
- Relatives: Alberto Barretto (great-granduncle); Antonio "Junior" Morales y Barretto (uncle); Claudine Barretto (sister); Gretchen Barretto (sister)
- Education: Philippine Women's University
- Occupation: Actress, politician

Marjorie Bernadine Castelo Barretto (Tagalog: [ˌmaːɾdʒɔˈɾi baˈrɛːto]; born 19 May 1974) is a Filipino former actress and politician. She also served as the city councilor of second district of Caloocan from 2007 to 2013; she ran for the same position in 2025 but lost. Her sisters, Claudine and Gretchen Barretto, and her daughter Julia are also actresses.

== Education ==
Barretto completed her Bachelor's degree in Communication Arts from the Philippine Women’s University in 2025.

== Personal life ==
Barretto has 5 children: Dani with actor Kier Legaspi; three children including actress Julia with ex-husband and actor-politician Dennis Padilla; and Erich with former Caloocan Mayor Enrico Echiverri. In 2019, Dani Barretto married Xavi Panlilio and gave birth to child Millie. In June 2024, Dani and Xavi confirmed their second child would be a boy, writing: "To our Millie girl and our son, I’m yours forever."

In November 1997, Barretto married Dennis Padilla, few months after their first child Julia was born. The former couple's relationship began to deteriorate due to a year and a half of growing differences and they separated in 2007. In the same year, Barretto filed for annulment. Their marriage was declared null and void in 2009 due to Padilla prior marriage in 1994.

The former couple have three children with actress Julia Barretto being the eldest, born in March 1997. Their second daughter Claudia Isabelle was born on July 26, 1999 and she was introduced as a talent Viva Artists Agency in January 2021. Claudia graduated with a Bachelor of Arts in Psychology from the Ateneo de Manila University in 2022. Leon Marcux is the youngest child, born on April 2, 2003. He is a Dean's Lister, studying Marketing at University of Asia and the Pacific in 2023.

On August 1, 2014, Padilla, assisted by Attorney Jose Virgilio "JV" Bautista, filed with RTC, Branch 126, Quezon City, a Petition to Annul a Court decision which allowed Claudia Isabelle to use Barretto instead of Baldivia as legal surname.

== Filmography ==
=== Film ===
Year	Title	Role
1993	Makuha Ka sa Tingin (Kung Pwede Lang)	
1994	Megamol	Margie
1994	Forever	Vivian
1994	Dillinger	
1994	Anghel Na Walang Langit	Mimi
1995	Campus Girls	Sabrina
1995	Silakbo	Maila
1995	Indecent Professor	Margatita
1996	Takot Ka Ba sa Dilim?	Manananggal
2005	D' Anothers	Mrs. Resurrecion
2006	Don't Give Up on Us	Aleli

=== Television ===
Year	Title	Role	Notes
1994	Ipaglaban Mo!		Episode: "Lason sa Dugo"
1996	Oki Doki Doc		
1996	Maalaala Mo Kaya	Violet	Episode: "Maleta"
1996	Maalaala Mo Kaya	Cynthia	Episode: "Kuwadro"
2001	Ikaw Lang ang Mamahalin	Vanessa Fuentebella	
2004	Wansapanataym	Various	2 episodes
2004	Spirits	Marita	
2013	Gandang Gabi, Vice!	Herself	
2013	Kapamilya, Deal or No Deal	Herself	
2015	My Fair Lady	Viveka	
