= 29th PMPC Star Awards for Television =

- Date: December 3, 2015; December 6, 2015 (Delayed Telecast)
- Location: Kia Theatre, Araneta Center, Cubao, Quezon City
- Hosted by: Boy Abunda; Gelli de Belen; Maja Salvador; Enchong Dee; Christian Bautista; Toni Gonzaga

Television/radio coverage
- Network: ABS-CBN
- Produced by: Airtime Marketing Philippines, Inc.

The 29th PMPC Star Awards for Television (organized by Philippine Movie Press Club headed by current president and over-all awards chairman Joe Barrameda and produced by Airtime Marketing Philippines, Inc. headed by Tessie Celestino-Howard) awarding ceremony was held on December 3, 2015, at the Kia Theatre, Araneta Center, Cubao, Quezon City and will be broadcast on ABS-CBN Channel 2 on December 6, 2015 ("Sunday's Best", 11:15pm). The awards night is hosted by Boy Abunda, Gelli de Belen, Maja Salvador, Enchong Dee, Christian Bautista and Toni Gonzaga, with opening number performed by Grae Fernandez, Ataska Mercado, Bailey May, Ylona Garcia, and additional musical performances from Christian Bautista, Klarisse de Guzman, Darren Espanto, Sofia Andres, Rodjun Cruz, Ella Cruz, and a tribute number for the Lifetime Achievement Awardees will be performed by Mark Mabasa, Lucky Robles, Lilibeth Garcia and JV Decena. The awards night will be under the direction of Mr. Bert de Leon.

== Nominees & Winners ==
These are the nominations list (in alphabetical order) for the awarding ceremony. (period: July 1, 2014, to June 29, 2015) Winners are listed first and highlighted with boldface.

=== Stations ===
Best TV Station

Winner: **ABS-CBN** (Channel 2)

  - ABS-CBN Sports+Action (Channel 23, still listed as Studio 23)
  - AksyonTV (Channel 41)
  - CNN Philippines (Channel 9)
  - GMA (Channel 7)
  - GMA News TV (Channel 11)
  - IBC (Channel 13)
  - Net 25 (Channel 25)
  - PTV (Channel 4)
  - TV5 (Channel 5)
  - UNTV Life (Channel 37)

=== Programs ===
Best Primetime Drama Series	Best Daytime Drama Series
Winner: **Bridges of Love** (ABS-CBN): Bagito (ABS-CBN); Forevermore (ABS-CBN); Hawak Kamay (ABS-CBN); Nathaniel (ABS-CBN); Pari 'Koy (GMA); The Rich Man's Daughter (GMA)	Winner: **The Half Sisters** (GMA): Ang Lihim ni Annasandra (GMA); Flordeliza (ABS-CBN); Healing Hearts (GMA); Kailan Ba Tama ang Mali? (GMA); Nasaan Ka Nang Kailangan Kita (ABS-CBN); Oh My G! (ABS-CBN)
Best Drama Mini-Series	Best Drama Anthology
Winner: **Ilustrado** (GMA): Give Love on Christmas (ABS-CBN); InstaDad (GMA); Sa Puso ni Dok (GMA News TV); Trenderas (TV5); Wattpad Presents (TV5); Wansapanataym (ABS-CBN)	Winner: **Magpakailanman** (GMA): Ipaglaban Mo! (ABS-CBN); Karelasyon (GMA); Maynila (GMA); Wagas (GMA News TV)
Best Public Service Program	Best Gag Show
Winner: **T3: Enforced (now T3: Alliance)** (TV5): Bistado (ABS-CBN); Failon Ngayon (ABS-CBN); Imbestigador (GMA); Mission Possible (ABS-CBN); S.O.C.O. (Scene of the Crime Operatives) (ABS-CBN); Wish Ko Lang (GMA)	Winner: **Banana Split Extra Scoop (now Banana Sundae)** (ABS-CBN): Goin' Bulilit (ABS-CBN); Tropa Mo Ko Nice Diba!? (TV5); Wow Mali! Lakas ng Tama! (TV5)
Best Comedy Program	Best Musical Variety Show
Winner: **Pepito Manaloto: Ang Tunay na Kwento** (GMA): 2 1/2 Daddies (TV5); Home Sweetie Home (ABS-CBN); Ismol Family (GMA); Luv U (ABS-CBN); Mac and Chiz (TV5); Vampire Ang Daddy Ko (GMA)	Winner: **ASAP 20** (ABS-CBN): It's Showtime (ABS-CBN); Letters and Music (Net 25); Road Show (Net 25); Sessions on 25th Street (Net 25); Sunday All Stars (GMA); Walang Tulugan with the Master Showman (GMA)
Best Reality Show	Best Game Show
Winner: **I Do** (ABS-CBN): Day Off (GMA News TV); Extreme Series: Kaya Mo Ba 'To (TV5); Pinay Beauty Queen Academy (GMA News TV)	Winner: **Wowowin** (GMA): Bonakid Pre-School: Ready, Set, Laban! (GMA); Celebrity Bluff (GMA); Happy Truck ng Bayan (TV5)
Best Talent Search Program	Best Educational Program
Winner: **A Song of Praise Music Festival** (UNTV Life): Bet ng Bayan (GMA); Move It: Clash of the Streetdancers (TV5); Talentadong Pinoy 2014 (TV5)	Winner: **Del Monte Kitchenomics** (GMA) and **Matanglawin** (ABS-CBN) - TIED: Born to Be Wild (GMA); Convergence (Net 25); Idol sa Kusina (GMA News TV); Swak na Swak (ABS-CBN); Taste Buddies (GMA News TV)
Best Celebrity Talk Show	Best Documentary Program
Winner: **Aquino and Abunda Tonight** (ABS-CBN): Gandang Gabi Vice (ABS-CBN); MOMents (Net 25); News.PH (CNN Philippines); Powerhouse (GMA); Tapatan ni Tunying (ABS-CBN); The Ryzza Mae Show (GMA)	Winner: **I-Witness** (GMA): Front Row (GMA); History with Lourd (TV5); Investigative Documentaries (GMA News TV); Motorcycle Diaries: Live The Ride (GMA News TV); Mukha (ABS-CBN); Reporter's Notebook (GMA)
Best Documentary Special	Best Magazine Show
Winner: **Spratlys: Mga Isla ng Kalayaan** (aired last October 5, 2014, on ABS-CBN): Cinema One 20th Anniversary Special: Sine, Laging Kasama (aired last November 2, 2014, on ABS-CBN); Eagle News Team Special Report: West Valley Fault (aired last July 2015 on Net 25); Padayon: Patuloy sa Pagbangon (aired last November 30, 2014, on PTV); Pagbangon (aired last November 8, 2014, on GMA); #PUSO2019: Ang Pambihirang Love Story ng mga Pinoy sa Basketball (aired last August 6, 2015, on TV5); Yaman ng Bayan (aired on the final Saturday of the month on TV5)	Winner: **Rated K** (ABS-CBN): Ang Pinaka (GMA News TV); Brigada (GMA News TV); Good News Kasama si Vicky Morales (GMA News TV); IJuander (GMA News TV); Kapuso Mo, Jessica Soho (GMA); Mga Kwento ni Marc Logan (ABS-CBN)
Best News Program	Best Morning Show
Winner: **State of the Nation with Jessica Soho** (GMA News TV): 24 Oras (GMA); Aksyon Prime (TV5); Balitanghali (GMA News TV); Bandila (ABS-CBN); Saksi (GMA); TV Patrol (ABS-CBN)	Winner: **Umagang Kay Ganda** (ABS-CBN): Good Morning Boss (PTV); Good Morning Kuya (UNTV Life); Masayang Umaga Po! (Net 25); Pambansang Almusal (Net 25); Unang Hirit (GMA)
Best Public Affairs Program	Best Children's Show
Winner: **The Bottomline with Boy Abunda** (ABS-CBN): 3-in-1 (ABS-CBN); Bawal ang Pasaway kay Mareng Winnie (GMA News TV); Face the People (TV5); Get It Straight with Daniel Razon (UNTV Life); Reaksyon (TV5); Solved na Solved (TV5)	Winner: **The KNC Show (Kawan ng Cordero)** (UNTV Life): Homework (Net 25); Tropang Potchi (GMA)
Best Showbiz Oriented Talk Show	Best Travel Show
Winner: **The Buzz** (ABS-CBN): Showbiz Konek na Konek (TV5); Startalk (GMA)	Winner: **Biyahe ni Drew** (GMA News TV): Bridging Boarders (PTV); Business Flight (GMA News TV); Lakbayin ang Magandang Pilipinas (PTV); Landmarks (Net 25); Rise & Shine (UNTV Life)
Best Lifestyle Show
Winner: **Gandang Ricky Reyes** (GMA News TV): AHA! (GMA); CHInoyTV (PTV); Fitness Center (Net 25); Follow That Star (GMA News TV); Kris TV (ABS-CBN); Weddings TV (GMA News TV)

=== Personalities ===
Best Drama Actor	Best Drama Actress
Winner: **Alden Richards** (Ilustrado / GMA 7): Daniel Padilla (Pangako Sa 'Yo / ABS-CBN); Eddie Garcia (Give Love on Christmas presents: The Gift Giver / ABS-CBN); Gerald Anderson (Nathaniel / ABS-CBN); Jericho Rosales (Bridges of Love / ABS-CBN); Paulo Avelino (Bridges of Love / ABS-CBN); Piolo Pascual (Hawak Kamay / ABS-CBN)	Winner: **Maja Salvador** (Bridges of Love / ABS-CBN): Aiko Melendez (Give Love on Christmas presents: The Gift Giver / ABS-CBN); Angelica Panganiban (Pangako Sa 'Yo / ABS-CBN); Coney Reyes (Nathaniel / ABS-CBN); Empress Schuck (Kailan Ba Tama ang Mali? / GMA 7); Jodi Sta. Maria (Pangako Sa 'Yo / ABS-CBN); Jolina Magdangal (FlordeLiza / ABS-CBN); Shaina Magdayao (Nathaniel / ABS-CBN)
Best Supporting Actor	Best Supporting Actress
Winner: **Baron Geisler** (Nathaniel / ABS-CBN): Carlo Aquino (FlordeLiza / ABS-CBN); Edu Manzano (Bridges of Love / ABS-CBN); JM de Guzman (Hawak Kamay / ABS-CBN); Mike Tan (The Rich Man's Daughter / GMA 7); Ronnie Lazaro (Pangako Sa 'Yo / ABS-CBN); Tirso Cruz III (Hawak Kamay / ABS-CBN)	Winner: **Sheryl Cruz** (Strawberry Lane / GMA 7): Amy Austria-Ventura (Pangako Sa 'Yo / ABS-CBN); Carmina Villarroel (Bridges of Love / ABS-CBN); Eula Valdez (Ilustrado / GMA 7); Irma Adlawan (Forevermore / ABS-CBN); Jean Garcia (The Half Sisters / GMA 7); Sofia Andres (Forevermore / ABS-CBN)
Best Single Performance by an Actor	Best Single Performance by an Actress
Winner: **John Lloyd Cruz** (Maalala Mo Kaya (MMK) episode: "Hat" / ABS-CBN): Alex Medina (Ipaglaban Mo! episode: "Niloko Niyo Ako" / ABS-CBN); Arjo Atayde (Maalaala Mo Kaya (MMK) episode: "Liham" / ABS-CBN); Coco Martin (Maalaala Mo Kaya (MMK) episode: "Watawat" / ABS-CBN); Edgar Allan Guzman (Maalaala Mo Kaya (MMK) episode: "Box" / ABS-CBN); Matt Evans (Ipaglaban Mo! episode: "Nasa Maling Landas" / ABS-CBN); Mike Tan (Magpakailanman episode: "8 Shades of Gay: The Tubato Family Story" / GMA 7)	Winner: **Judy Ann Santos** (Maalaala Mo Kaya (MMK) episode: "Ilog" / ABS-CBN) and **Sunshine Cruz** (Maalaala Mo Kaya (MMK) episode: "Barko" / ABS-CBN) - TIED: Agot Isidro (Maalaala Mo Kaya (MMK) episode: "Hat" / ABS-CBN); Alessandra de Rossi (Magpakailanman episode: “Sabit-sabit, Kabit-kabit, Mga Pusong Malupit” / GMA 7); Angel Locsin (Maalaala Mo Kaya (MMK) episode: "Watawat" / ABS-CBN); Kaye Abad (Maalaala Mo Kaya (MMK) episode: "Hat" / ABS-CBN); Nora Aunor (Karelasyon episode: "Tres Rosas" / GMA 7)
Best Child Performer	Best New Male TV Personality
Winner: **Harvey Bautista** (Wansapanataym presents: "Remote ni Eric" / ABS-CBN) and **Marco Masa** (Nathaniel / ABS-CBN) - TIED: Alonzo Muhlach (Inday Bote / ABS-CBN); Ashley Sarmiento (FlordeLiza / ABS-CBN); Chlaui Malayao (Yagit / GMA 7); Jana Agoncillo (Dream Dad / ABS-CBN); Xyriel Manabat (Hawak Kamay / ABS-CBN); Zaijian Jaranilla (Hawak Kamay / ABS-CBN)	Winner: **Alonzo Muhlach** (Inday Bote / ABS-CBN): Jemuell Ventinilla (Yagit / GMA 7); Joshua Garcia (Nasaan Ka Nang Kailangan Kita / ABS-CBN); JV Cruz (Iskoolmates: May Pakialam Ka! / PTV 4); Kurt Ong (Wansapanataym presents: "My Kung Fu Chinito / ABS-CBN); Kyle Blanco (Bridges of Love / ABS-CBN); Sancho Vito (Let the Love Begin / GMA 7)
Best New Female TV Personality	Best Public Service Program Host(s)
Winner: **Jana Agoncillo** (Dream Dad/ ABS-CBN): Ali Forbes (Pinay Beauty Queen Academy / GMA News TV); Loisa Andalio (Nasaan Ka Nang Kailangan Kita / ABS-CBN); Maine Mendoza (Eat Bulaga / GMA 7); Maris Racal (Maalaala Mo Kaya (MMK) episode: "Lobo" / ABS-CBN); MJ Lastimosa (Maalaala Mo Kaya (MMK) episode: "Takure / ABS-CBN); Stephanie Yamut (Yagit / GMA 7)	Winner: **Vicky Morales** (Wish Ko Lang! / GMA 7): Arnold Clavio (Alisto! / GMA 7); Ben, Erwin and Raffy, The Tulfo Brothers (T3: Enforced / TV5); Gus Abelgas (S.O.C.O. / ABS-CBN); Julius Babao (Mission Possible / ABS-CBN); Marissa del Mar (Buhay OFW / Aksyon TV); Ted Failon (Failon Ngayon / ABS-CBN)
Best Comedy Actor	Best Comedy Actress
Winner: **Jayson Gainza** (Banana Split Extra Scoop / ABS-CBN): Clarence Delgado (Goin' Bulilit / ABS-CBN); John Lloyd Cruz (Home Sweetie Home / ABS-CBN); Michael V. (Pepito Manaloto: Ang Tunay na Kwento / GMA 7); Ryan Agoncillo (Ismol Family / GMA 7); Sef Cadayona (Bubble Gang / GMA 7); Vic Sotto (Vampire Ang Daddy Ko / GMA)	Winner: **Rufa Mae Quinto** (Bubble Gang / GMA 7): Angelica Panganiban (Banana Split Extra Scoop / ABS-CBN); Carmi Martin (Ismol Family / GMA 7); Manilyn Reynes (Pepito Manaloto: Ang Tunay na Kwento / GMA 7); Mutya Orquia (Goin' Bulilit / ABS-CBN); Ryzza Mae Dizon (Vampire Ang Daddy Ko / GMA 7); Toni Gonzaga (Home Sweetie Home / ABS-CBN)
Best Male TV Host	Best Female TV Host
Winner: **Vice Ganda** (It's Showtime / ABS-CBN): Billy Crawford (It's Showtime / ABS-CBN); Luis Manzano (ASAP 20 / ABS-CBN); Martin Nievera (ASAP 20 / ABS-CBN); Robi Domingo (ASAP 20 / ABS-CBN); Wally Bayola (Eat Bulaga! / GMA)	Winner: **Anne Curtis** (It's Showtime / ABS-CBN): Pia Guanio (Eat Bulaga! / GMA 7); Sarah Geronimo (ASAP 20 / ABS-CBN); Toni Gonzaga (ASAP 20 / ABS-CBN); Vina Morales (ASAP 20 / ABS-CBN); Zsa Zsa Padilla (ASAP 20 / ABS-CBN)
Best Reality Show Host(s)	Best Game Show Host(s)
Winner: **Toni Gonzaga-Soriano, Bianca Gonzalez-Intal, Enchong Dee and Robi Domingo** (Pinoy Big Brother: 737 / ABS-CBN): Ali Forbes (Pinay Beauty Queen Academy / GMA News TV); Derek Ramsay (Extreme Series: Kaya Mo Ba 'To / TV5); Julie Anne San Jose, Dasuri Choi, Maey Bautista, Mike "Pekto" Nacua and Norman "Boobay" Balbuena (Day Off / GMA News TV); Judy Ann Santos (I Do / ABS-CBN); Toni Gonzaga-Soriano, Bianca Gonzalez-Intal, John Prats and Robi Domingo (Pinoy Big Brother: All In / ABS-CBN)	Winner: **Luis Manzano** (Kapamilya, Deal or No Deal / ABS-CBN) and **Willie Revillame** (Wowowin / GMA 7) - TIED: Eugene Domingo (Celebrity Bluff / GMA); Judy Ann Santos (Bet On Your Baby / ABS-CBN); Ogie Alcasid (Let's Ask Pilipinas / TV5); Richard Gomez and K Brosas (Quiet Please!: Bawal ang Maingay / TV5); Vic Sotto (Who Wants to Be a Millionaire? / TV5)
Best Talent Show Program Host(s)	Best Educational Program Host(s)
Winner: **Billy Crawford** (Your Face Sounds Familiar / ABS-CBN): Jasmine Curtis-Smith and Tom Taus (Move It: Clash of the Streetdancers / TV5); Luis Manzano, Robi Domingo, and Yeng Constantino (The Voice Kids (Philippines season 2) / ABS-CBN); Regine Velasquez, and Alden Richards (Bet ng Bayan / GMA 7); Richard Reynoso, and Toni Rose Gayda (A Song of Praise Music Festival / UNTV Life); Robin Padilla, Mariel Rodriguez-Padilla, and Tuesday Vargas (Talentadong Pinoy 2014 / TV5); Toni Gonzaga, Luis Manzano, Robi Domingo, and Alex Gonzaga (The Voice of the Philippines (season 2) / ABS-CBN)	Winner: **Kuya Kim Atienza** (Matanglawin / ABS-CBN): Chef Pablo "Boy" Logro (Idol sa Kusina / GMA News TV); Chris Tiu, and James and Rodfill "Moymoy Palaboy" Obeso (IBilib / GMA 7); Dimples Romana, Carlos Agassi, and Bobby Yan (Swak na Swak / ABS-CBN); Eagle Riggs (Easy Lang Yan! / UNTV Life); Dr. Ferdinand "Ferdz" Recio and Dr. Nielson Donato (Born to be Wild / GMA 7); Jennylyn Mercado (Sarap with Family / GMA News TV)
Best Celebrity Talk Show Host(s)	Best Documentary Program Host(s)
Winner: **Kris Aquino, and Boy Abunda** (Aquino and Abunda Tonight / ABS-CBN): Anthony "Ka Tunying" Taberna (Tapatan ni Tunying / ABS-CBN); Gladys Reyes-Sommereux (MOMents / Net 25); Pia Hontiveros (News.PH / CNN Philippines); Tim Yap (The Tim Yap Show / GMA 7); Vice Ganda (Gandang Gabi Vice / ABS-CBN)	Winner:**Sandra Aguinaldo, Kara David, Jay Taruc and Howie Severino** (I-Witness / GMA 7): Atom Araullo (RealiTV / ABS-CBN); Dyan Castillejo (Sports U: Ikaw ang Panalo! / ABS-CBN); Jay Taruc (Motorcycle Diaries: Live The Ride / GMA News TV); Jiggy Manicad, and Maki Pulido (Reporter's Notebook / GMA 7); Malou Mangahas (Investigative Documentaries / GMA News TV); Veronica Baluyut-Jimenez (The Veronica Chronicles / PTV)
Best Magazine Show Host(s)	Best Morning Show Host(s)
Winner: **Korina Sanchez-Roxas** (Rated K / ABS-CBN): Jessica Soho (Kapuso Mo, Jessica Soho / GMA 7); Marc Logan (Mga Kwento ni Marc Logan / ABS-CBN); Rovilson Fernandez (Ang Pinaka / GMA News TV); Susan Enriquez, and Cesar Apoliario (IJuander / GMA News TV); Tonipet Gaba (Pop Talk / GMA News TV); Vicky Morales, Bea Binene, and Love Añover (Good News Kasama si Vicky Morales / GMA News TV)	Winner: **Arnold Clavio, Rhea Santos, Ivan Mayrina, Connie Sison, Susan Enriquez, Nathaniel "Mang Tani" Cruz, Lyn Ching-Pascual, Lhar Santiago, Suzi Entrata-Abrera, Luane Dy, Love Añover, Tonipet Gaba, Prof. Solita "Mareng Winnie" Monsod, Regine Tolentino, and Atty. Gaby Concepcion** (Unang Hirit / GMA 7): Anthony Taberna, Amy Perez, Bernadette Sembrano-Aguinaldo, Jorge Cariño, Ariel Ureta, Winnie Cordero, and Atom Araullo (Umagang Kay Ganda / ABS-CBN); Kuya Daniel Razon, Former Cong. Erin Tañada III, Angela Lagunzad, Atty. Regie Tongol, Rheena Villamor, Diego Castro, Thalia Javier, Monica Verallo, Jun Soriao, and Erica "Kikay" Hondrado (Good Morning Kuya! / UNTV Life); Dianne Medina, Aljo Bendijo, Audrey Gorricetta, Jules Guiang and Karla Paderna (Good Morning Boss / PTV); Gen Subardiaga, Mavic Trinidad, Onin and Gelmi Miranda, and Sophia Okut (Pambansang Almusal / Net 25); Leo Martinez, and Cita Astals (Masayang Umaga Po! / Net 25)
Best Male Newscaster	Best Female Newscaster
Winner: **Erwin Tulfo** (Aksyon Prime / TV5): Angelo Castro III (Why News / UNTV Life); Arnold Clavio (Saksi / GMA 7); Julius Babao (Bandila / ABS-CBN); Mike Enriquez (24 Oras / GMA 7); Noli de Castro (TV Patrol / ABS-CBN); Ted Failon (TV Patrol / ABS-CBN)	Winner: **Jessica Soho** (State of the Nation / GMA News TV): Karen Davila (Bandila / ABS-CBN); Korina Sanchez (TV Patrol / ABS-CBN); Luchi Cruz Valdes (Aksyon Prime / TV5); Mel Tiangco (24 Oras / GMA 7); Pia Arcangel (Saksi / GMA 7); Vicky Morales (24 Oras / GMA 7)
Best Public Affairs Program Host(s)	Best Children's Show Host(s)
Winner: **Boy Abunda** (The Bottomline / ABS-CBN): Kuya Daniel Razon (Get It Straight with Daniel Razon / UNTV Life); Gelli de Belen, Arnell Ignacio, and Atty. Mel Sta. Maria (Solved na Solved / TV5); Gelli de Belen, Christine Bersola-Babao, and Edu Manzano (Face The People / TV5); Karen Davila, K Brosas and Atty. Claire Castro (3-in-1 / ABS-CBN); Luchi Cruz Valdes (Reaksyon / TV5); Prof. Solita "Mareng Winnie" Monsod (Bawal ang Pasaway kay Mareng Winnie / GMA News TV)	Winner: **Eric Cabobos, Bency Vallo, Moonlight Alarcon, Cid Capulong, Cedie Isip, Kim Enriquez, Tim Argallon, Angelica Tejana, Leanne Manalanzan, and Kyla Manarang** (The KNC Show / UNTV Life): Aira Binas, Gerard Pangusan, Rissey Reyes, Alex Reyes, and Fred Lo (Hi-5 Philippines / TV5); Sabrina Man, Miggy Jimenez, Isabel "Lenlen" Frial, Nomer Limatog, Miggs Cuaderno, and Kyle Daniel Ocampo (Tropang Potchi / GMA); Teacher Sally Lopez (Homework / Net 25)
Best Male Showbiz-Oriented Talk Show Host	Best Female Showbiz-Oriented Talk Show Host
Winner: **Ricky Lo** (Startalk / GMA): Butch Francisco (Startalk / GMA); IC Mendoza (Showbiz Konek na Konek / TV5); Joey de Leon (Startalk / GMA)	Winner: **Toni Gonzaga** (The Buzz / ABS-CBN): Bianca King (Showbiz Konek na Konek / TV5); Heart Evangelista (Startalk / GMA); Kris Aquino (The Buzz / ABS-CBN); Lolit Solis (Startalk / GMA); MJ Marfori (Showbiz Konek na Konek / TV5)
Best Travel Show Host(s)	Best Lifestyle Show Host(s)
Winner: **Drew Arellano** (Biyahe ni Drew / GMA News TV): Faye de Castro-Umandal (Landmarks / Net 25); Louella del Cordova, Jenny Fajardo, and Jackie Aquino (Rise & Shine / UNTV Life); Angono Mayor Gerry Calderon (Lakbayin ang Magandang Pilipinas / PTV); Venus Raj, and Cristina Decena (Business Flight / GMA News TV); Veronica Baluyut-Jimenez (Bridging Borders / PTV)	Winner: **Kris Aquino** (Kris TV / ABS-CBN): Drew Arellano (AHA! / GMA); Gretchen Ho, and Willord Chua (ChinoyTV / PTV); Heart Evangelista (Weddings TV / GMA News TV); Pia Guanio (Home Base / GMA News TV); Ricky Reyes (Gandang Ricky Reyes / GMA News TV); Shawn Yao (Fitness Center / Net 25)

Notes:

- To focused on original TV creations, the PMPC had decided that franchised local programs (drama adaptations, reality, children's, and game shows) and drama remakes (including Yagit and Pangako Sa Yo) were not nominated. Actors and hosts who part of the cast in these programs are only included in the list.
- PMPC Hall of Famers who won 15 times in a row including Maalaala Mo Kaya (Best Drama Anthology), Eat Bulaga! (Best Musical Variety Show), Bubble Gang (Best Gag Show) and Boy Abunda (Best Male Showbiz-Oriented Talk Show Host except on his other categories as "Best Celebrity Talk Show Host" & "Best Public Affairs Program Host".) were also excluded in the nominees list of their respective categories. Hosts and Actors from the three Hall of Famers shows are also included in the list.

=== Rundown ===
Number of Nominees

Network	Total #
ABS-CBN	146
ABS-CBN Sports+Action	1
AksyonTV	1
CNN Philippines	3
GMA	88
GMA News TV	38
IBC	1
Net 25	18
PTV 4	12
TV5	36
UNTV Life	13

Number of Winners (excluding Special Awards)

Network	Total #
ABS-CBN	33
GMA	15
GMA News TV	5
UNTV Life	3
TV5	2

== Special awards ==
=== Ading Fernando Lifetime Achievement Award ===
- Coney Reyes

=== Excellence in Broadcasting Award ===
- Robert Tan (Male)
- Maria A. Ressa (Female) (Founder and CEO of Rappler and Former Head of ABS-CBN News and Current Affairs)

=== German Moreno's Power Tandem Award ===
- "Aldub" (Alden Richards and Maine Mendoza)
- "LizQuen" (Liza Soberano and Enrique Gil)

=== Star of the Night ===
- Male Star of the Night: Bailey May
- Female Star of the Night: Ylona Garcia

== See also ==
- PMPC Star Awards for Television
- 2015 in Philippine television
- 7th PMPC Star Awards for Music
