= HAPPinas Happy Hour =

2016 Philippine defunct television variety show

- Genre: Variety show
- Created by: Wilma V. Galvante
- Developed by: TV5 Entertainment Division; Content Cows Company; Viva Communications
- Directed by: Ivan Dedicatoria
- Presented by: Various "Kapatid" stars
- Country of origin: Philippines
- Original language: Filipino
- No. of episodes: 23

Production
- Executive producer: Ryan Benitez
- Production locations: TV5 Studio A Novaliches, Quezon City
- Camera setup: Multi-camera setup
- Running time: 60 minutes
- Production companies: TV5; Viva Television; Content Cows Company

Original release
- Network: TV5
- Release: May 6 – September 30, 2016

Related
- Happy Truck ng Bayan; Happy Truck HAPPinas

HAPPinas Happy Hour is a Philippine television variety show broadcast by TV5. It aired from May 6 to September 30, 2016, replacing the Friday slot of Sports 360. The show's comedy sketches, which parody contemporary culture and politics, are performed by a large and varying cast of repertory and newer cast members.

== History ==
=== Happy Truck ng Bayan ===
The show was originally a noontime variety show produced by TV5 and was started airing since June 14, 2015. HTNB is airing every Sunday, 11:00am to 1:00pm on TV5, and it is the biggest project of TV5 on that year and hosted by Janno Gibbs, Derek Ramsay, Tuesday Vargas, Kim Idol and former Kapamilya and Kapuso stars. The show ended last February 7, 2016.

=== Happy Truck HAPPinas ===
In 2015, VIVA Communications, Inc. made an agreement with TV5 that they will be the official production outfit to handle all the Entertainment requirements of TV5. On February 7, 2016, HTNB marks their final episode. It will be replaced by a similarly formatted program, Happy Truck HAPPinas, that set to premiere live on March 6, 2016 with same hosts and same timeslot. It formally ended last May 1, 2016.

== Cast ==
=== Hosts ===
- Eula Caballero (2016)
- Tuesday Vargas (2016)
- Maria Ozawa (2016)
- Mark Neumann (2016)
- Margo Midwinter (2016)
- Abby Poblador (2016)

=== Former hosts ===
- Gelli de Belen
- Yassi Pressman
- Ogie Alcasid
- Daiana Menezes
- Ella Cruz
- Kim Idol
- Janno Gibbs
- Empoy (2016)
- Alwyn Uytingco (2016)

== See also ==
- List of TV5 (Philippine TV network) original programming
- Happy Truck ng Bayan
- Happy Truck HAPPinas
