= Cassandra: Warrior Angel =

- Title card
- Genre: Horror fantasy Superhero fiction
- Written by: Benedict Mique, Volta delos Santos
- Directed by: Eric Quizon; Argel Joseph; Benedict Mique
- Starring: Eula Caballero; Eula Valdez; Gabby Concepcion
- Opening theme: "Kahit Isang Saglit" by Gerald Santos
- Country of origin: Philippines
- Original language: Tagalog
- No. of episodes: 64

Production
- Executive producer: Jhanice Gail Damaso
- Running time: 30 minutes

Original release
- Network: TV5
- Release: May 6 – August 2, 2013

Related
- Kidlat; Undercover

Cassandra: Warrior Angel is a 2013 Philippine television drama fantasy series broadcast by TV5. Directed by Eric S. Quizon, Argel Joseph and Benedict Mique, it stars Gabby Concepcion, Eula Valdez, and Eula Caballero. It aired from May 6 to August 2, 2013, replacing Kidlat.

== Overview ==
Replacing the Derek Ramsay-starrer Kidlat, the latter had a fictional crossover with Cassandra: Warrior Angel in its last two weeks.

== Cast and characters ==
=== Main cast ===
- Eula Caballero as Cassandra/Angela
- Gabby Concepcion as Azrael/Uriel/Ariel
- Eula Valdez as Larissa/Gloria Cruz
- Joshua Stangeland as Calix/Alim
- Albie Casiño as Jude Solcruz
- JC de Vera as Gabriel
- Pen Medina as Lolo Gimo
- Alwyn Uytingco as Arman/Cristoff de Luna

=== Supporting cast ===
- William Martinez as Ermi
- Jan Michael Legacion as leo
- Mercedes Cabral as Camilla/Hunyango
- Helga Krapf as Mara de Luna
- Jopay Paguia as Imelda
- Dianne Medina as Faye
- Mon Confiado as Dado
- Biboy Ramirez as SPO2 Jaime Santiago
- Arthur Acuña as Ezekiel de Luna
- Vangie Labalan as Aling Belay
- Noel Urbano as Abdon
- Morissette as Kristel
- Rocky Salumbides as Barabas/Tikbalang
- Joaqui Tupas as Maldo
- Karel Marquez as Louella
- Epy Quizon as Henry
- Victor Silayan as Adrian/Tikbalang

=== Recurring cast from Third Eye ===
- Lorna Tolentino as Jana Alcuaz
- Daniel Matsunaga as Lucas
- Victor Silayan as Adrian
- Clint Gabo as Dongbi
- Jenny Miller as Sonia de Vera
- Darlene Alquintos as Yuri
- Gelli de Belen as Manananggal
- Richard Quan as Manananggal
- Lilia Cuntapay as Aling Ursula
- Iwa Moto as Ursula's mother

== See also ==
- List of TV5 (Philippine TV network) original programming
