= Happy Truck HAPPinas =

2016 Philippine defunct television variety show

- Also known as: HTH
- Genre: Variety show Game show
- Developed by: TV5 Entertainment Division; Viva Communications
- Directed by: GB Sampedro
- Presented by: Various "Kapatid" and "VIVA Artist" stars
- Opening theme: "Happy Truck HAPPinas" by Ogie Alcasid and Janno Gibbs
- Country of origin: Philippines
- Original language: Filipino
- No. of episodes: 9

Production
- Production locations: TV5 Studio A Novaliches, Quezon City
- Camera setup: Multi-camera setup
- Running time: 2 hours
- Production companies: TV5 Entertainment Group; Viva Television

Original release
- Network: TV5
- Release: March 6 – May 1, 2016

Related
- Happy Truck ng Bayan; HAPPinas Happy Hour Sunday Noontime Live!

Happy Truck HAPPinas is a Philippine television variety show broadcast by TV5. It aired from March 6 to May 1, 2016, replacing Movie Max 5 and was replaced by Movie Max 5. It is mainly presented by Ogie Alcasid, Janno Gibbs, Derek Ramsay, Tuesday Vargas, and Kim Idol. The show is airing every Sunday, 11:00am to 1:00pm on TV5, and it is the biggest project to date this year by the network and hosted by majority of the network's bunch of talents collectively known as "HappyPeeps".

Competed against long-time rivals ASAP of ABS-CBN and Sunday PinaSaya of GMA Network, it serve as the replacement of former show, Happy Truck ng Bayan, whom it was the brainchild project of former TV5's Entertainment Division Head, Wilma Galvante, until she resigned on her position. HTH also served as drive for advertisers and sponsors thru on-ground and below-the-line activation events and pluggings for the network's new shows.

== Hosts ==
- Derek Ramsay
- Tuesday Vargas
- Kim Idol
- Shy Carlos
- Empoy
- Alwyn Uytingco
- Eula Caballero
- Mark Neumann

=== Former hosts ===
- Alonzo Muhlach
- Ogie Alcasid
- Sam Pinto
- Gelli de Belen
- Ritz Azul
- Yassi Pressman
- Meg Imperial
- Roxanne Barcelo
- Ella Cruz
- Janno Gibbs

=== Featuring ===
- Sexbomb Girls

=== Sugar and Spice ===
- Jessie Salvador
- Nathalie Colipano
- Jasmine Hollingworth
- Nicole Omillo
- Issa Pressman

=== YOLOL ===
- Akihiro Blanco
- Andrew Muhlach
- VJ Marquez
- Jason Salvador
- Owy Posadas
- Jack Reid

== Segments ==
=== Linggo Limbo ===
“Linggo Limbo" is a warm-up game, where the five best limbo rock performers will be chosen by Ogie and Janno to advance in the portion's next level. Each “Linggo Limbo” level correspondents to a cash prize.

== See also ==
- List of TV5 (Philippine TV network) original programming
