= Tuesday Vargas =

Filipino actress, singer and comedian (born 1980)

- Born: Marizel Sarangelo; November 9, 1980 (age 45); Sampaloc, Manila, Philippines
- Genres: Pinoy pop; OPM
- Occupations: Singer; actress; comedian
- Instruments: Vocals; guitar; ukulele
- Years active: 1996–present
- Formerly of: Top Junk

Marizel Sarangelo-Placido (born November 9, 1980), known professionally as Tuesday Vargas, is a Filipino actress, singer, and comedian. Vargas was the frontwoman of the dance-punk band, Top Junk.

She also served as a resident judge on TV5's Talentadong Pinoy. She has appeared on programs aired by GMA Network and TV5, and has previously worked with ABS-CBN and RPN.

== Early life ==
Vargas was born Marizel Sarangelo on November 9, 1980, in Sampaloc, Manila. She attended Manila Science High School. Vargas was diagnosed with autism and ADHD at the age of 12, and later suffered from PTSD.

== Career ==
Vargas has appeared in television and film beyond her work in comedy. In 2006, she appeared in Gulong ng Palad as Saling, which she described as a comic relief character, and Bituing Walang Ningning as Libby. She later starred in Mga Mata ni Anghelita (2007) and Kaputol ng Isang Awit (2008).

She gained recognition for the film Here Comes the Bride (2010). Vargas played the lead role in the independent film, Ang Turkey Man Ay Pabo Rin (2012), an entry to the 1st CineFilipino Film Festival. In 2019, she had a supporting role in LSS (Last Song Syndrome), an official entry at the 3rd Pista ng Pelikulang Pilipino.

== Personal life ==
She shared in an interview that she discovered Buddhism in 2006 and practiced the Theravada school of Buddhism.

Vargas married musician Coy Placido in a Christian ceremony in Boracay on June 19, 2010. Both were Buddhists, but the ceremony followed Christian traditions for the benefit of family and friends. They separated after 14 years of marriage. In 2020, Vargas revealed that she was in a relationship with theater actor Joseph Puducay.

Vargas became a single mother at the age of 21 and has spoken publicly about her experience.

== Filmography ==
=== Film ===
Year	Title	Role	Ref.
2003	Keka	Mica	
2003	First Time		
2003	Liberated	Katrina	
2003	Mr. Suave	Stella	
2003	Captain Barbell	Gang	
2004	Liberated 2	April	
2004	Lastikman: Unang Banat	Maritess	
2005	Let the Love Begin	Wendy	
2005	Say That You Love Me	Friday	
2005	Hari ng Sablay	Maritess	
2006	Coup Betat		
2006	I Will Always Love You	Frida	
2006	Kasal, Kasali, Kasalo	Catalina/Kaye	
2007	Sakal, Sakali, Saklolo	Catalina/Kaye	
2010	Here Comes the Bride	Medelyn	
2013	Ang Turkey Man Ay Pabo Rin	Conchita "Cookie" Bigoy	
2018	The Girl in the Orange Dress	Liberty Su	
2019	LSS (Last Song Syndrome)	Rubi	
2026	18th Rose	Contest Judge	

=== Television/Digital show ===
Year	Title	Role
2006	Gulong ng Palad	Saling
2006	Bituing Walang Ningning	Libby
2006	Love Spell: Home Switch Home	Supporting Cast
2007	Sineserye Presents: Hiram na Mukha	Sahasa (Guest Cast)
2007	Bahay Mo Ba 'To?	Ms. Penelope Summer
2007	Magic Kamison	Sutla
2007	Lupin	Magdalene
2007	Mga Mata ni Angelita	Selya
2008	Sine Novela: Kaputol ng Isang Awit	Mimay Sison
2008–2013	Lokomoko U	Herself / Various roles
2009–2010	Show Me Da Manny	Shakira
2010–2011	P.O.5	Herself / Host
2011	Hapi-er Togeder	Herself
2012	Cooking Kumares	Yumi Gonzales
2012–2014	Good Morning Club	Herself / Co-host
2014	Talentadong Pinoy	Audience and Backstage Host
2014	Wattpad Presents: The Savage Casanova	Ella Escobar
2015–2016	Happy Truck ng Bayan	Herself / Co-host / Performer
2015	Kano Luvs Pinay	Cookie
2016	Happy Truck HAPPinas	Herself / Co-host / Performer
2016	HAPPinas Happy Hour	Herself / Co-host / Performer
2016	Eat Bulaga!	Herself / Challenge Accepted Winner
2016	Dear Uge: Burol in This Together	Ehra
2016	Wish Ko Lang	Herself
2017	Banana Sundae	Herself / Guest co-host
2017	Family Feud	Herself / Contestant
2017	All-Star Videoke	Herself / Contestant
2018	Daddy's Gurl	Hannah Silva
2020	Fill in the Bank	Herself / Contestant
2020	Bangon Talentadong Pinoy	Judge
2021–2024	All-Out Sundays	Herself / Co-host / Various roles
2021	Magandang Buhay	Herself / Guest host
2022–2023	Bubble Gang	Herself
2022	TiktoClock	Herself / substitute host for Pokwang
2022	Barangay PIE Silog: Life Guro	Herself / Guest
2023	Mga Lihim ni Urduja	Ebony Ventura
2023	Open 24/7	Chin-chin
2024	Your Honor	Herself / host
2024–2026	Face To Face Harapan	Herself / co-host

== Singles ==
- Babae Po Ako
- Kuya Wag Po

== Accolades ==
Awards and NominationsAwards and nominations received by Tuesday Vargas
Award	Year	Category	Nominated work	Result	Ref.
Aliw Awards	2010	Best Stand-Up Comedian (Female)	—N/a	Nominated	
Golden Screen Awards	2011	Best Performance by an Actress in a Leading Role (Musical or Comedy)	Here Comes the Bride	Nominated	
Golden Screen Awards	2014	Best Performance by an Actress in a Leading Role (Musical or Comedy)	Ang Turkey Man Ay Pabo Pa Rin	Won	
Golden Screen TV Awards	2011	Outstanding Performance by an Actress in a Gag/Comedy Program	Lokomoko	Nominated	
Golden Screen TV Awards	2013	Outstanding Performance by an Actress in a Gag/Comedy Program	Lokomoko	Nominated	
Pista ng Pelikulang Pilipino	2019	Best Supporting Actress	LSS (Last Song Syndrome)	Won	
PMPC Star Awards for Movies	2021	Movie Supporting Actress of the Year	LSS (Last Song Syndrome)	Nominated	
PMPC Star Awards for Television	2013	Best Morning Show Host	Good Morning Club	Nominated	
PMPC Star Awards for Television	2015	Best Talent Show Program Host(s)	Talentadong Pinoy	Nominated	
PMPC Star Awards for Television	2016	Best Game Show Host(s)	HAPPinas Happy Hour	Nominated	
PMPC Star Awards for Television	2025	Best Comedy Actress	Bubble Gang	Nominated	
