= Eula Caballero =

Filipina actress

Eula Caballero-Samson
- Born: Lou Eula May Caballero Simo; May 23, 1995 (age 31); Boljoon, Cebu, Philippines
- Occupation: Actress
- Years active: 2010–2016
- Agent: Talent5 (now Star Worx)
- Spouse: Christian Samson (m. 2017)
- Children: 2

Lou Eula May Caballero Simo-Samson (born May 23, 1995), known professionally as Eula Caballero, is a Filipino former actress. She is known as the first Star Factor grand winner. She also played the role of Holly Posadas in the TV mini-series, Nandito Ako on TV5. Caballero landed a major project wherein she again portrayed the daughter of a veteran actress, ranged against the Diamond Star Maricel Soriano. Eula played as the daughter of Maricel Soriano and Gabby Concepcion in the Metro Manila Film Festival (MMFF) entry Yesterday, Today, Tomorrow.

== Background ==
In 2010, she joined the celebrity talent search of TV5, Star Factor. She was one of the 18 star hopefuls and after few weeks of training, made it to the top 4 or "Final 4". In the Grand Finals held at the Ynares Sports Arena, she was declared the winner of the talent search.

== Personal life ==
Eula was born in Boljoon, Cebu, to Mary Lou Caballero-Simo and Euladio Simo. She is married with her Star Factor co-finalist and former actor Christian Samson on October 10, 2017 in San Diego, California, U.S.

== Filmography ==
=== Film ===
Year	Title	Role	Network	Notes
2011	Yesterday, Today, Tomorrow	Eunice	Regal Entertainment, Studio 5	Main Cast
2012	Shake, Rattle and Roll Fourteen: The Invasion	Ming	Regal Entertainment	Main Cast
2013	Raketeros	Danica Mote	Heaven's Best Entertainment	Main Cast

=== Television ===
Year	Title	Role	Notes	Network
2010	Star Factor	Herself	Contestant	TV5
2010	Star Confessions: The Joseph Bitangcol Confession	Sandara Park	Lead Role	TV5
2011	Luv Crazy: Love's a Beach	Jackilyn Villamayor	Lead Role	TV5
2011	Magic Gimik	Tooth Fairy	Main Cast	TV5
2011	Bagets: Just Got Lucky	Tara Montes	Main Cast	TV5
2011	Hey It's Saberdey!	Hosts	Co-Hosts	TV5
2011	Rod Santiago's The Sisters	Sheila	Supporting Role	TV5
2011	Sa Ngalan ng Ina	Elsa Toribio	Supporting Role	TV5
2011	Lokomoko	Supporting Role	Lead Role	TV5
2012	Nandito Ako	Holly Posadas	Main Cast / Antagonist	TV5
2012	Regal Shocker: Theater		Lead Role	TV5
2012	Third Eye	Cassandra	Lead Role	TV5
2012	Enchanted Garden	Ella	Supporting Role	TV5
2013	Never Say Goodbye	Teen/Pre-Adult Martha Carpio	Guest Appearance	TV5
2013	Hayop sa Galing	Herself	Guest	TV5
2013	Kidlat	Cassandra	Special Guest (fictional crossover)	TV5
2013	Cassandra: Warrior Angel	Cassandra	Lead Role	TV5
2013	Tropa Mo Ko Unli	Supporting Role	Lead Role	TV5
2014	One of the Boys	Gabi Silang	Lead Role	TV5
2015	Wattpad Presents: Trip In Love or Fall In Love	Supporting Role	Lead Role	TV5
2015	Wattpad Presents: Lady In Disuise	Supporting Role	Lead Role	TV5
2015	Wattpad Presents: Maid For Korean Boys	Supporting Role	Lead Role	TV5
2015	Happy Truck ng Bayan	Hosts	Co-Hosts	TV5
2015	No Harm No Foul	Supporting Role	Lead Role	TV5
2015	Lola Basyang.com Presents: Dalagang Bukid	Supporting Role	Lead Role	TV5
2015	Wattpad Presents: Take or Leave It	Supporting Role	Lead Role	TV5
2015	Kano Luvs Pinay	Supporting Role	Lead Role	TV5
2015	Wattpad Presents: Wrong Numbers	Supporting Role	Lead Role	TV5
2016	Lola Basyang.com Presents: Lokohan sa Langit	Supporting Role	Lead Role	TV5
2016	Wattpad Presents: Heart Over Matter	Supporting Role	Lead Role	TV5
2016	Happy Truck HAPPinas	Hosts	Co-Hosts	TV5
2016	Wattpad Presents: Picture of You	Supporting Role	Lead Role	TV5
2016	HAPPinas Happy Hour	Hosts	Co-Hosts	TV5
2016	#ParangNormal Activity	Nimfa	Guest Appearance	TV5

=== Music video ===
Year	Title	Artist	Album	Label
2013	Kung Di Man	Ney Dimaculangan	Philpop 2013	Universal Records

== Awards and nominations ==
Year	Award	Category	Nominated work	Result	Notes
2012	PMPC Star Awards for Movies	New Movie Actress of the Year	Yesterday, Today, Tomorrow	Nominated	
2012	Enpress Golden Screen Awards	Breakthrough Performance by an Actress	Yesterday, Today, Tomorrow	Nominated	
