= Mel Sta. Maria =

Filipino law professor and television/radio presenter

5th Dean of the Far Eastern University Institute of Law
- In office 2013 – December 31, 2022
- Preceded by: Andres Bautista
- Succeeded by: Jose Marlon Pabiton

Personal details
- Born: Melencio Santos Sta. Maria Jr. February 23, 1957 (age 69)
- Spouse: Amaparita de los Santos
- Children: 3
- Education: Ateneo de Manila University (B.S. & LL.B.); Boston University (LL.M.)
- Occupation: Lawyer; professor; television and radio presenter
- Known for: Relasyon host Dean Far Eastern University Institute of Law
- Nickname(s): Atty. Mel; Dean Mel

Melencio Santos Sta. Maria Jr. (Tagalog: [sɐnta mɐˈɾia]; born February 23, 1957) is a Filipino lawyer, law professor, and presenter on television and radio. He served as the dean of Far Eastern University's law school from 2013 to 2022. He has also been teaching at his alma mater, the Ateneo School of Law, since 1986.

In television and radio, he is affiliated with TV5, notably as a legal correspondent for Relasyon and Solved na Solved.

== Education and career ==
He graduated at Aquinas School in 1974, then graduated BS Biology at Ateneo de Manila University in 1978, and four years later he obtained his Bachelor of Laws at the same school with his classmate Ray Espinosa (current director at the Manny Pangilinan-led group and 1982 bar topnotcher). After joining the Philippine Bar he became partner at the Tanjuatco Sta. Maria Tanjuatco Law Firm. He obtained his Master of Law in Banking in Boston University in 1986. Also in that year, he started to teach at the Ateneo Law School, as the professor in Persons and Family Relations Law, Obligations and Contracts, as well as the Civil Law Review and a reviewer for Civil law. He is also a lecturer for Philippine Judicial Academy.

In 2013, he was appointed Dean of Far Eastern University Institute of Law replacing Atty. Andres Bautista. During his term, he started scholarship and financial assistance programs for meritorious and financially-challenged students. His tenure also coincided with improvements in FEU-IL's bar exam ratings. He ended his term on December 31, 2022 and was succeeded by Atty. Jose Marlon Pabiton who previously served as the associate dean.

On July 6, 2020, Sta. Maria and six other law professors from FEU filed a petition to the Supreme Court to issue a temporary restraining order (TRO) against several provisions of the Anti-Terrorism Act of 2020, which was signed by President Rodrigo Duterte on July 3. The said provisions include the law's definition of terrorism, the acts it considers as "terrorism", the process by which individuals and groups are labelled and officially declared as terrorists, and the warrantless detention of suspected terrorists. Sta. Maria's group aims to have the aforementioned provisions declared unconstitutional and void.

== Broadcast career ==
He joined News5 in 2010 as a legal adviser, he also joins Relasyon along with News5 head Luchi Cruz-Valdes on DWFM and AksyonTV, in 2015 he joins the new legal advice show Solved na Solved with Gelli de Belen (she also spoofed Cruz-Valdes on Tropa Mo Ko Unli on Walang Relasyon parody) and Arnell Ignacio on TV5.

In August 2014, Sta. Maria interviewed President Benigno Aquino III in Malacañan Palace, about his possible re-election in 2016 despite a constitutional ban (on re-election). Expressing a bit of constitutional reform, Sta Maria's interview with Aquino was praised by netizens.

== Books authored ==
- Read My Mind (2013)
- What's the Point (2015)
- Persons and Family Relations Law (Rex Publishing, 1995)

== Personal life ==
Mel is the eldest son of Melencio Sta. Maria, a medical doctor, and Florencia Santos, and the younger brother to Melita Sta. Maria-Thomeczek, current Philippine Ambassador to Germany in Berlin. He is married to Amparita de los Santos, also a lawyer and ALS classmate with whom he has 3 children.
