= Top Junk =

Filipino band, dance-punk

- Origin: Quezon City, Philippines
- Genres: Pinoy rock; alternative rock
- Years active: 2005–present
- Label: D Chord Records
- Members: Tuesday Vargas; Coy Placido; Dennis Leung
- Past members: Tim Panganiban
- Website: www.topjunk.com.ph

Top Junk is a dance-punk indie rock band from the Philippines. Band members are Izel Sarangelo (vocals, synth), Coy Placido (guitar, bass, keys, synth), and Dennis Leung (drums). Coy (from the band sessiOnroad) and Izel (a.k.a. Tuesday Vargas) are the group's chief composers.

Formed in 2005, the band's upbeat musical style combines elements of punk rock, disco, pop music, new wave music and funk music. Their songs mostly emphasize on straightforward everyday musings. The band chose a name that reflects the constant contradictions of life in general, from simple concerns to philosophical musings. The group uploaded their demos through various websites and made their initial music available at no cost.

In December 2009, Top Junk released their self-titled album under Indie label D Chord Records, and released a zombie-themed video.

In September 2014 Top Junk released an EP titled RETOX, with the carrier "Significant Other." Top Junk is included in the P Fest UK Line Up headlined by Sandwich (band), Pedicab (band), Yano, Squid 9 & more which showcases Pilipino distinguished musical artists.

== Discography ==
Top Junk (2009)
Retox (2014)
