= Happy Truck ng Bayan =

2015–16 Philippine defunct television variety show

- Genre: Game show Variety show
- Created by: Wilma Galvante
- Developed by: TV5 Entertainment Division
- Directed by: GB Sampedro
- Presented by: Ogie Alcasid; Janno Gibbs; Derek Ramsay; Gelli de Belen
- Country of origin: Philippines
- Original language: Filipino
- No. of episodes: 35

Production
- Executive producers: Juel Balbon; Nelson Alindogan
- Running time: 2 hours

Original release
- Network: TV5
- Release: June 14, 2015 – February 7, 2016

Related
- Happy Truck HAPPinas; HAPPinas Happy Hour

Happy Truck ng Bayan is a Philippine television variety show broadcast by TV5. It aired from June 14, 2015 to February 7, 2016, replacing Movie Max 5 and was replaced by Movie Max 5. The program airing every Sunday, 11:00am to 1:00pm, and The biggest project to date this year by the network and hosted by majority of the network's bunch of talents collectively known as "HappyPeeps".

Initially, HTNB visited selected barangays and places in Metro Manila (Manila, San Juan, Marikina, Quezon City, Caloocan, Valenzuela, to name a few) and Central Luzon (Pampanga), using a roving truck that transformed into a stage using remote control hydraulics system, with various segments and games cater to the growing number of audiences from Class D & E (masa).

Competed against long-time rivals ASAP of ABS-CBN, Sunday All Stars of GMA Network and its successor, the comedy-and-variety show Sunday PinaSaya, it was the brainchild project of TV5's Entertainment Division Head Wilma Galvante. HTNB also served as drive for advertisers and sponsors thru on-ground and below-the-line activation events and pluggings for the network's new shows.

HTNB did "taped as LIVE" shows in different parts of the country, in Northern Luzon, Southern Luzon, Visayas and Mindanao.

== Cast ==
=== Main hosts ===
- Ogie Alcasid
- Janno Gibbs
- Derek Ramsay
- Gelli de Belen

=== Co-hosts ===
- Mark Neumann
- Shaira Diaz
- Empoy Marquez
- Tuesday Vargas
- Martin Escudero
- Eula Caballero
- Alwyn Uytingco
- Jingo Ismol
- Toni Rodriguez-Aquino
- Kim Idol
- Tom Taus
- Ritz Azul

=== Featuring ===
- SexBomb Girls

=== Former cast ===
- Valeen Montenegro
- Mariel Rodriguez
- Vin Abrenica
- Jasmine Curtis-Smith
- Akihiro Blanco
- Empoy Marquez

== Segments ==
- Barangay Most Wanted
- Bida ng Dance Floor
- Ooohhh... Construction Worker - male personality search
- Barangay Bayani - nomination and voting for the most deserved neighbors of the barangay
- Ready, Set, Goma!
- Ta-Wattpad
- Sing-Ko - musical segment of Janno and Ogie (similar to their segment "Sobrang OJ Pare" then on SOP)
- Kwarta o Kwar-truck - segment on the final stretch of the show where the winner will take home ₱300,000 jackpot inside the lucky capsule

== See also ==
- List of TV5 (Philippine TV network) original programming
