= Solved na Solved =

- Genre: Talk show, reality
- Created by: TV5 Network, Inc.
- Presented by: Gelli de Belen; Arnell Ignacio; Atty. Mel Sta. Maria
- Country of origin: Philippines
- Original languages: Filipino; English
- No. of episodes: 59

Production
- Running time: 30 minutes

Original release
- Network: TV5
- Release: January 19 – April 16, 2015

Solved na Solved (English: Solved to Solved) is a Philippine television talk show broadcast by TV5. Hosted by Gelli de Belen, Arnell Ignacio and Atty. Mel Sta. Maria, it aired from January 19 to April 16, 2015.

On April 6, 2015, the program will change its schedule every Tuesday to Thursday, and its 2nd Season but on April 16, the show went off air.

== Final hosts ==
- Gelli de Belen
- Arnell Ignacio
- Atty. Mel Sta. Maria

== See also ==
- List of TV5 (Philippine TV network) original programming
- Face to Face
- Face the People
