= Kidlat =

2013 Philippine television drama series

- Title card
- Genre: Fantasy; Action
- Developed by: Renato Custodio, Jr.
- Written by: Renato Custodio Jr. Mark Gil "Volta" delos Santos; Renee Patricia Dimla; Mark Adrian Ho; Ma. Abegail Lam-Parayno
- Directed by: Michael Tuviera; Eric S. Quizon; Topel Lee
- Starring: Derek Ramsay; Nadine Samonte; Baron Geisler
- Opening theme: "Sabihin Mo Lang" by Juris Fernandez
- Ending theme: "Di Ka Nag-iisa (Kidlat)" by Sandwich
- Composers: Trina Belamide; Raimund Marasigan
- Original language: Tagalog
- No. of episodes: 83

Production
- Executive producer: Anabelle T. Macauba
- Producers: Ramel L. David; Jojo C. Oconer
- Production location: Philippines
- Cinematography: Nonong Legaspi
- Running time: 30 minutes

Original release
- Network: TV5
- Release: January 7 – May 3, 2013

Related
- Cassandra: Warrior Angel

Kidlat (transl. Lightning) is a 2013 Philippine television drama fantasy series broadcast by TV5. Directed by Michael Tuviera, Eric S. Quizon and Topel Lee, it stars Derek Ramsay in the title role. It aired from January 7 to May 3, 2013, replacing Enchanted Garden and was replaced by Cassandra: Warrior Angel.

== Synopsis ==
Voltaire was the son of the couple Dulce and Mario. At a young age, he and his mother were assailed by a "perfect storm" where lightning 'struck' Voltaire, but left him unharmed. He discovered he had power afterwards but he kept it from his mother. As he grew, he felt alone because of his secret, but everything changed when he met Lara.

Follow the life of Voltaire, an ordinary person, who acquired a strange power after being hit by lightning from the "perfect storm". Witness the journey of Voltaire as he learns to control and use his power to protect his family and his community from dangerous opponents. Derek Ramsay stars in this thrilling saga of love and resurrection as Kidlat.

== Cast and characters ==
=== Main cast ===
- Derek Ramsay as Voltaire Megaton / Kidlat
- Ritz Azul as Josephine "Joey" Palomares
- Nadine Samonte as Lara Martinez
- Baron Geisler as Vincent Megaton Jr. / Diablo
- Wendell Ramos as Rodel / Graba Man

=== Supporting cast ===
- Chanda Romero as Minerva Megaton
- Niña Jose as Xyra Ignacio
- Shaira Diaz as Francine Gutierrez / Frosta
- Mark Neumann as Francis Gutierrez / Fuego
- Valerie Weigmann as Natasha Thorpe / Enigma
- Paolo Ballesteros as Walter Marasigan / Warla
- Jay Manalo as Mario Palomares / Burak
- Nanette Inventor as Tita Sol
- Lianne Valentin as Cindy
- Lou Veloso as Miguel
- Erika Padilla as Chichi
- Joross Gamboa as Melvin
- Kokoy de Santos as Alvin
- Isabel Rivas as Dulce
- Andrea Del Rosario as Priscilla
- Christopher Roxas as Anthony
- Arcel Zulueta as Zack

=== Special Participation ===
- Christopher de Leon as Vincent Megaton Sr.
- Assunta De Rossi as young Dulce
- Spanky Manikan as Tata Domeng
- BJ Forbes as young Voltaire
- Sandy Talag as young Lara

=== Special Finale Participation ===
- Eula Caballero as Cassandra

== Marketing ==
On December 17, 2012, TV5 unveils its Kidlat billboard on EDSA, but it caused heavy traffic at EDSA, due to Derek's appearance as Kidlat costume. On January 6, 2013, before Kidlat aired on primetime, TV5 previewed the series by airing its telemovie.

=== Meme status ===
After the issues with defending against bashers on Derek Ramsay's Instagram account of his then-girlfriend, Andrea Torres who allegedly called by a basher "Retokada" (transl. Retouched) and also defending his friend Bea Alonzo after her breakup with Gerald Anderson, the series saw a rejuvenated interest in Philippine meme culture spawning from various Facebook meme pages which posted a series of meme revolving around the character, which made "Wag kang bastos!" (transl. Don't be rude!) synonymous with Ramsay within the community.

== See also ==
- List of TV5 (Philippine TV network) original programming
