= Kusina Kings =

2018 comedy film by Victor Villanueva

- Theatrical release poster
- Directed by: Victor Kaiba Villanueva
- Screenplay by: Victor Kaiba Villanueva; Joma Labayen; Jeps Gallon
- Story by: Enrico C. Santos; Victor Kaiba Villanueva
- Produced by: Carlo Katigbak; Malou N. Santos; Olivia M. Lamasan
- Starring: Zanjoe Marudo; Empoy Marquez; Ryan Bang; Nathalie Hart; Maxine Medina
- Cinematography: Ruel Antipuesto
- Edited by: Beng Bandong
- Music by: Ammie Ruth Suarez
- Production company: Star Cinema
- Distributed by: ABS-CBN Film Productions
- Release date: July 25, 2018 (Philippines)
- Running time: 107 minutes
- Country: Philippines
- Language: Filipino
- Box office: ₱20 million

Kusina Kings is a 2018 Philippine comedy film directed by Victor Kaiba Villanueva and co-written by Joma Labayen and Jeps Gallon from a story concept developed by Villanueva and Enrico C. Santos. The film stars Zanjoe Marudo and Empoy Marquez.

Produced and distributed by ABS-CBN Film Productions, the film was theatrically released in the Philippines on July 25, 2018.

== Cast ==
- Zanjoe Marudo as Macaroni "Ronnie" Magsino
- Empoy Marquez as Benjie Perez
- Ryan Bang as Gian Nyeam
- Nathalie Hart as Jenny Perez
- Maxine Medina as Baby Girl
- Jun Sabayton as Bert
- Hyubs Azarcon as Burnok
- Nonong Ballinan as Gulayat
- Joma Labayen as Kimchi
- Tiny Corpuz as Bulgogi
- KaladKaren as KaladKaren Davila (Reporter), host of Kusina King Challenge/herself
- Negi as Chef Mufasa Tangnamerz
- Chokoleit as Mr. Tsin Tsan Shih Tzu
- Jayson Gainza as Manny Duncut

== Plot ==
Two best friends enter a cook off challenge to save their restaurant. Zanjoe Marudo as Ronnie and chef restaurateur Empoy Marquez as Benjie have been best friends since high school. When Benjie decided to put up his own restaurant La Luna Sa Hungry, Ronnie has never left his side especially now that Benjie has joined in the shady "Kusina King Challenge" to save the restaurant. Benjie and Ronnie have a falling out when Ronnie has wrongly given Benjie's startup money for the challenge to a scammer. Things then go out of proportion with Ronnie accidentally placing Benjie in a coma. Ronnie was the only person was able to see Benjie as ghost while he's in a coma...
