= One of the Boys (Philippine TV series) =

- Genre: Comedy; Melodrama
- Created by: TV5 Entertainment Group
- Written by: Benedict Mique; Nathaniel Arciaga; Volta Delos Santos
- Starring: Joey de Leon; Eula Caballero; Empoy Marquez; Nadine Samonte; Daniel Marsh; Brian Wilson; Charlie Sutcliffe; Michael McDonnell; Henry Edwards
- Country of origin: Philippines
- Original language: Tagalog
- No. of episodes: 9

Production
- Running time: 30 minutes

Original release
- Network: TV5
- Release: May 3 – July 5, 2014

One of the Boys is a Philippie television situational comedy series broadcast by TV5. Starring Joey de Leon, Eula Caballero, Empoy Marquez, Nadine Samonte, Daniel Marsh, Brian Wilson, Charlie Sutcliffe, Michael McDonnell and Henry Edwards, it aired from May 3 to July 5, 2014, replacing Celebrity Dance Battle and was replaced by It Takes Gutz to Be a Gutierrez.

== Cast ==
- Joey de Leon as Daddy Jerry "DJ" Silang
- Eula Caballero as Gabi Silang
- Empoy Marquez as Aga Silang
- BJ Forbes as Sonny Silang
- Nadine Samonte
- Daniel Marsh as Daniel
- Brian Wilson as Brian
- Charlie Stucclife as Charlie
- Michael McDonnell as Miko
- Henry Edwards as Henry Potter
- Marco Chavez as Dondon Silang

== See also ==
- List of TV5 (Philippine TV network) original programming
