= Coy Placido =

Filipino composer and guitarist

- Birth name: Jerico Calica Placido
- Born: October 20, 1977 (age 47); Baguio, Philippines
- Genres: Rock, pop rock, alternative rock, Pinoy rock
- Occupation(s): Musician, artist, composer
- Instrument(s): Guitar, bass, keyboard
- Years active: 1999–present
- Labels: Star Records, Alpha Records, D Chord Records
- Website: www.folding8.com

Coy Placido (born Jerico Calica Placido, October 20, 1977) is the composer and guitarist of the Filipino bands sessiOnroad Top Junk and Blue Ruins.

== Career ==
Coy Placido is a songwriter and a founding member of sessiOnroad and the indie band Top Junk. He is also a graphic artist.

== Personal life ==
Coy is married to Tuesday Vargas. They were wed in Boracay in 2010.

Placido attended preparatory school in Saint Louis School Of Campo Filipino and Saint Louis University (Philippines) Baguio for high school. Placido graduated from STI College in 1998 with a degree in Computer Science.

== Discography ==
=== sessiOnroad ===
- Albums
  - Session Road (1999), Star Records
  - Suntok Sa Buwan (2004), Alpha Records
  - Bakit Hindi? (2006), Alpha Records
- EP
  - Lagi Na Lamang Ba (Recorded 2008) (Independently released 2016)

=== Top Junk ===
- Albums
  - Top Junk (2009, independent release under D Chord Records)
- EP
  - Retox (2014, independent release under D Chord Records)
