= Empoy Marquez =

Filipino actor, comedian and host (born 1982)

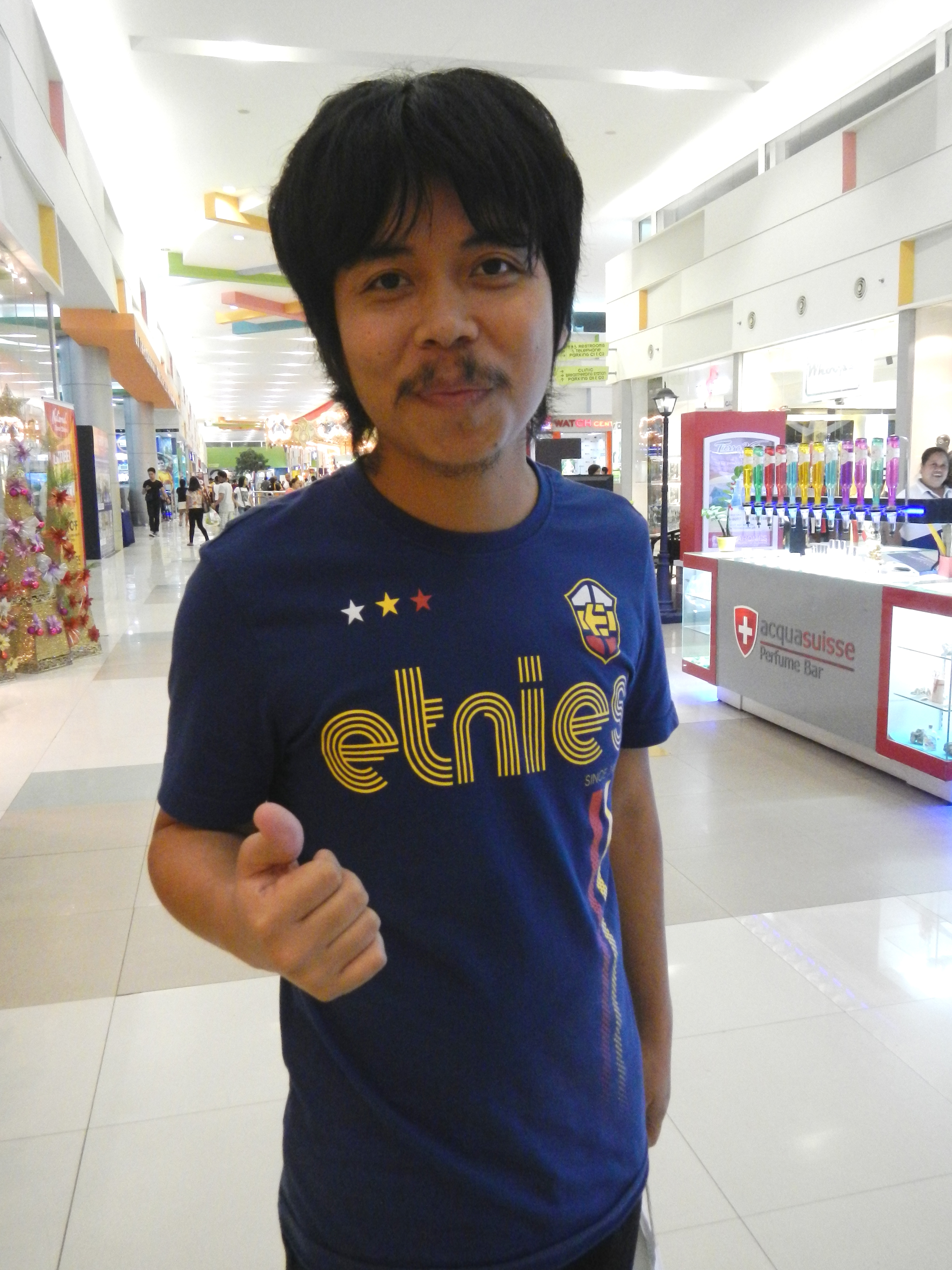
- Marquez in 2014
- Born: Julius Erman Ramos Marquez; July 3, 1981 (age 45); Baliuag, Bulacan, Philippines
- Occupations: Actor; comedian; host
- Years active: 2003–present
- Agent(s): ABS-CBN (2003-2011, 2017-2020); TV5 (2011-2017, 2021-2022); GMA Network (2022-present)

Comedy career
- Medium: Film; television
- Genre: Observational comedy

Julius Erman "Empoy" Ramos Marquez (born July 3, 1981), also known mononymously as Empoy, is a Filipino actor, comedian and host. He is best known for playing the male lead in Kita Kita (2017), the highest-grossing Filipino independent film of all time. His performance earned him a nomination for the Gawad Urian for Best Actor.

After winning the Mr. Suave look-alike contest on Magandang Tanghali Bayan, he was awarded a minor role in the 2003 comedy film Mr. Suave. From 2003 to 2008, he had small roles in several films and television shows, where he was typecast as the comical sidekick. He also appeared in some independent films.

Marquez then appeared in TV5's Lokomoko (2008–2013), Tropa Mo Ko Unli (2013–2015), and played the titular superhero character in Kapitan Awesome (2012–2013). He also portrayed Chiz in the 2015 sitcom Mac & Chiz. In 2018, he had a supporting role in the television drama Since I Found You and also co-starred in the film Kusina Kings.

== Life and career ==
Julius Erman Ramos Marquez was born in Baliuag, Bulacan on July 3, 1981. He is the eldest among seven siblings, and his parents separated when he was in sixth grade. He earned his college degree in mass communication with the intention of becoming a DJ.

In 2003, Marquez won the Mr. Suave look-alike contest on ABS-CBN's Magandang Tanghali Bayan. Aside from the cash prize, he was also awarded a role in the film, which starred Vhong Navarro as the title character. He also became a co-host of MTB Ang Saya-Saya for a year.

Marquez was signed to Star Magic from 2003 to 2007, and moved to TV5 in 2008. During this time, he had small roles in several films and television shows where he was typecast as the comical sidekick. He also appeared in the independent films Sa Aking Pagkakagising Mula Sa Kamulatan (2005) and Carnivore (2008), both directed by Ato Bautista and starring Carlo Aquino.

In TV5, Marquez appeared in the sketch comedy show Lokomoko, which aired from 2008 to 2013 – the network's longest-running comedy show. He then played the titular superhero character in Kapitan Awesome (2012–2013), and became a cast member of Tropa Mo Ko Unli (2013–2015). He considers the 2015 sitcom Mac & Chiz as his "big break", where he co-starred as Chiz, alongside Derek Ramsay who played Mac.

In 2017, Marquez returned to ABS-CBN and became part of the sketch comedy show Banana Sundae. He also appeared in the suspense thriller film Bloody Crayons (2017) as Gerard, the "clown" of the group of friends who travel to a remote island to make a short film, until they get killed one by one by a masked individual.

Afterwards, Marquez co-starred in the romantic comedy film Kita Kita (2017), opposite to Alessandra de Rossi. He portrayed Tonyo, a plain-looking but kind-hearted OFW in Japan, who falls in love with a blind woman played by De Rossi. According to the film's co-producer Piolo Pascual, the role of Tonyo was "tailor-made" for Marquez. Against expectations, Kita Kita went on to become the highest-grossing Filipino independent film of all time, earning ₱300 million (approx. US$5.88 million) within three weeks of release. Due to the film's popularity, the entertainment media dubbed Marquez and De Rossi's pairing as "AlEmpoy". For his performance, he was nominated for the Gawad Urian for Best Actor. He also co-hosted the 41st Gawad Urian Awards ceremony with De Rossi and Butch Francisco.

In July 2017, Marquez opened Wayback 90's, a 1990s-themed restobar in his hometown, Baliuag, Bulacan.

In 2018, Marquez and De Rossi had supporting roles in the ABS-CBN series Since I Found You, which aired from April to August. That same year, in the comedy film Kusina Kings, Marquez and Zanjoe Marudo starred as a pair of chefs who attempt to save their restaurant by joining a reality show.

Beginning in 2019, Marquez appeared in FPJ's Ang Probinsyano as Domingo "Domengsu" Suarez, an aspiring actor who is mistakenly arrested in a drug raid and later becomes a police informant. Also in 2019, he was reunited with De Rossi in the music video for "Pag-ibig Sa Tabing-Dagat" by Orange and Lemons.

Marquez again co-starred with De Rossi in Walang KaParis, an Amazon Prime Video original film released in March 2023. The romantic drama is set in Paris and was directed by Kita Kita director Sigrid Andrea Bernardo.

In 2024, he joined Susan Enriquez as the newest co-host of GTV's news magazine show iJuander.

== Filmography ==
Key
†	Denotes films that have not yet been released

=== Film ===
Year	Title	Role	Ref
2003	Mr. Suave	Mr. Takatak	
2005	Sa Aking Pagkakagising Mula Sa Kamulatan	Kahoy	
2008	My Only You	Romnick	
2008	One Night Only	Gudo	
2008	Carnivore	---	
2008	Supahpapalicious	Hercules	
2009	Villa Estrella	Otap	
2009	Ang Tanging Pamilya: A Marry Go Round	Ka-Bado	
2010	Hating Kapatid	Firecracker Buyer (as Empoy)	
2010	I Do	Counselor	
2010	Cinco	Denden	
2010	Ang Tanging Ina Mo (Last na 'To!)	William (Seven's Husband)	
2010	Paano na Kaya	Kwek-Kwek	
2011	Enteng ng Ina Mo	William	
2014	Bride for Rent	Javier	
2014	Da Possessed	Dado Balbitero	
2017	Bloody Crayons	Gerard Anderson	
2017	Kita Kita	Tonyo	
2017	The Barker	Coco	
2018	Kusina Kings	Benjie Perez	
2020	Hayop Ka! (You Son of a Bitch!)	Jerry (voice)	
2023	Walang KaParis	Jojo	
2023	Penduko	Pendro Penduko	
2023	Kidnap For Romance	Fred	
2023	Fruitcake	Diego	
2024	My Zombabe	Pong	
2025	Everyone Knows Every Juan	Brother Felix	

=== Television ===
Year	Title	Role
2003	Magandang Tanghali Bayan	Himself / Co-host
2005	Maynila	Empoy
2005	Bora: Sons Of The Beach	Empoy
2006	Super Inggo	Petrang Kabayo
2007	Sineserye Presents: May Minamahal	
2008	Kahit Isang Saglit	Nestor
2008–2013	Lokomoko	Himself
2010	Kokey @ Ako	Bubot
2011	Star Confessions Presents: The Caloy Alde Story	Teen Caloy
2011	Love Spell Presents	Various
2011	Ang Utol Kong Hoodlum	Epal
2012–2013	Kapitan Awesome	Kapitan Awesome
2014	Tropa Mo Ko Unli	Himself
2014	The Legal Wife	Anjo
2014	One of the Boys	Aga Silang
2014	Wattpad Presents: His Secretary	Denver
2015	Mac and Chiz	Chiz Espinosa
2015	Happy Truck ng Bayan	Himself / Host
2015	Happy Truck HAPPinas	Himself / Host
2016	Carlo J. Caparas' Ang Panday	Juro
2016	HAPPinas Happy Hour	Himself / Host
2016	Wagas	Juanito
2017	Goin' Bulilit	Himself / Guest
2017	Banana Sundae	Himself / Co-Host
2018	Since I Found You	James Ribs
2019	Maalaala Mo Kaya: Jacket	Dong Corpuz
2019–2020	FPJ's Ang Probinsyano	Domingo "Domengsu" Suarez
2020	Eat Bulaga!	Himself / Guest Contestant
2021	Niña Niño	Gardo
2022	Bubble Gang	Himself / Various roles
2022	Jose & Maria's Bonggang Villa	Johnny
2022	Family Feud	Himself / Contestant
2022	Happy ToGetHer	Emmanuel "Emman" Arturo
2022	Running Man Philippines	Himself/Guest runner
2022	Pepito Manaloto: Tuloy ang Kuwento	Pio
2022	Anong Meron Kay Abok?	Abok
2023	Open 24/7	Jerico
2023–24	Black Rider	Oscar "Oka" Santos
2024–present	iJuander	Himself / Host
2024	Abot-Kamay na Pangarap	Oscar "Oka"
2024	Sellblock	
2024	May 4 Ever	
2024	LOL: Last One Laughing Philippines	Himself / Contestant
2025	My Ilonggo Girl	Dante "Daboy" Galang
2025	It's Showtime	Himself / Guest Performer
2025	Rainbow Rumble	Himself / Contestant

== Awards and nominations ==
Year	Award-giving body	Category	Work	Result	Ref
2018	Gawad Urian	Best Actor	Kita Kita	Nominated	
2018	Guillermo Mendoza Box Office Awards	Breakthrough Movie Actor of the Year	Kita Kita	Won	
2018	Guillermo Mendoza Box Office Awards	Breakthrough Movie Love Team (with Alessandra de Rossi)	Kita Kita	Won	
