= SessiOnroad =

Filipino alternative rock band

Session Road
- Origin: Baguio, Benguet, Philippines
- Genres: Pinoy rock; alternative rock
- Years active: 1998–present
- Labels: Star; Alpha
- Members: Hannah Romawac-Olives; Coy Placido; Chavi Romawac; Jimbo San Pedro; JV Romawac
- Past members: Jonathan Placido; Jesse Hoover; Glen Laciste; Jal Taguibao; Richard Carandang

Session Road (stylized as sessiOnroad) is an alternative rock band from the Philippines. Band members are Hannah Romawac-Olives (vocals, rhythm guitar), Coy Placido (lead guitar, synth/also from the band Top Junk), Chavi Romawac (drums, percussions), JV Romawac (percussions, backup vocals) and Jimbo San Pedro (bass).

Coy and Hannah are the group's chief composers. sessiOnroad's music showcases a fusion of different genres—rock music, pop music, alternative rock, blues, reggae, soul music, and mainstream.

The band's first album was produced by Grace Nono and Bob Aves under Star Records and was released in February 2000. It was the release of the first single SUNTOK SA BUWAN, from their second album of the same title and produced by Alpha Records in September 2004, that gained for sessiOnroad a lot of recognition from the listening public. The song topped the charts in almost all major radio stations in Manila for two straight weeks since it started airplay. Suntok sa Buwan was nominated song of the year for 2004. "Blanko" a meditative song about emptiness, from their 2006 album "Bakit Hindi?" (Why Not?), won the band's Awit Award Best Music Video under the people's choice category in 2007.

== Discography ==
- Session Road (1999)
- Suntok sa Buwan (2004)
- Bakit Hindi? (2006)
- Lagi Na Lamang Ba (EP) (2016)

== Compilations ==
- The Metropop Song Festival (2001)
- Trip (U-turn Star Cinema OST, 2003)
- Pinoy Big Brother Compilation (Star Records, 2005)
- Pinoy Ako 2 (Star Records, 2006)
- The Best of Manila Sound: Hopia Mani Popcorn 2 (2007)
- Bagong Banda---Awit Ni Sampaguita (2008)

== Band members ==
Current members

- Hannah Romawac-Olives - vocals, rhythm guitar
- Coy Placido - lead guitar, synth
- Chavi Romawac - drums and percussions
- Jimbo San Pedro - bass
- JV Romawac - percussion and backup vocals

Early members

- Jonathan Placido
- Jesse Hoover
- Glen Laciste
- Jal Taguibao
- Richard Carandang

== Awards and nominations ==
Year	Award giving body	Category	Nominated work	Results
2002	8th KATHA Music Awards	Best Alternative Music Composition	"Gravity"	Won
2002	8th KATHA Music Awards	Best Alternative Music Vocal Performance	"Gravity"	Won
