= Mac and Chiz =

- Title card
- Genre: Sitcom
- Created by: TV5 Entertainment Group
- Written by: Memot Navarro; Volta Delos Santos; Nathaniel Arciaga
- Directed by: Jade Castro; Sam Dabao
- Starring: Derek Ramsay; Empoy Marquez
- Country of origin: Philippines
- Original language: Tagalog
- No. of episodes: 23

Production
- Executive producers: Nelson Lopez Alindogan; Racquel Dacanay
- Running time: 60 minutes (1 hour)

Original release
- Network: TV5
- Release: January 25 – June 28, 2015

Mac and Chiz (stylized as Mac & Chiz) is a Philippine television sitcom series broadcast by TV5. Directed by Jade Castro and Sam Dabao, starring Derek Ramsay and Empoy Marquez. It aired from January 25 to June 28, 2015, replacing Quiet Please!: Bawal ang Maingay and was replaced by No Harm, No Foul. The show airs every Sunday at 8:00pm later moved to 7:00pm and back at 8:00pm.

== Premise ==
It is about the twins Mac Vasquez (Derek Ramsay) and Chiz Espinosa (Empoy Marquez), who are living with their different environments. Mac and his father Sir Chef Vasquez (Jun Sabayton) are managing their restaurant business, while Chiz and his mother Jaya (Diana Zubiri) are managing a cafeteria business.

== Cast ==
=== Main cast ===
- Derek Ramsay as Mac Vasquez
- Empoy Marquez as Chiz Espinosa
- John Lapus as Mamu Chok
- Jojo Alejar as Greg Vasquez
- Bianca King as Candy

=== Supporting cast ===
- Ana Roces as Madam Peaches Vasquez
- Jun Sabayton as Ser Chef Vasquez
- Rubi Rubi as Paning
- Carmina Manzano as Regina

=== Guest cast ===
- Epy Quizon as Choco
- Boy2 Quizon as Ham
- Victor Silayan as Vincent
- Roxanne Barcelo as Pie
- Wendell Ramos as Gene
- Gerhard Acao as Henry
- Bangs Garcia as Apple
- Mutya Johanna Datul as Francine
- April Gustilo as Sowie
- Carlos Agassi as Dodong
- Manny Castañeda as Mr. Ong
- Valerie Concepcion as Yamyam
- Mailes Kanapi as P.I.
- Onyok Velasco as chief

== See also ==
- List of TV5 (Philippine TV network) original programming
