= Face the People =

2013–14 Philippine television talk show

- Genre: Tabloid talk show
- Created by: TV5 Entertainment Group
- Written by: Arnel Lunca; Jake Bacud; Teolo Veluz
- Directed by: GB Sampedro
- Presented by: Gelli de Belen; Christine Bersola-Babao; Edu Manzano
- Country of origin: Philippines
- Original languages: Filipino; English
- No. of episodes: 268

Production
- Executive producer: Ma. Hilda Yaneza
- Camera setup: Multiple-camera setup
- Running time: 60 minutes

Original release
- Network: TV5
- Release: October 14, 2013 – November 21, 2014

Related
- Face to Face; Solved na Solved

Face the People is a Philippine television tabloid talk show broadcast by TV5. Hosted by Gelli de Belen and Christine Bersola-Babao, it aired from October 14, 2013 to November 21, 2014, replacing Face to Face.

The former Trio Tagapayo of Face-to-Face return as a Konsensya ng Bayan to give good advice and counselling to resolve the visitors' issues and problems in Face The People. Atty. Karen Jimeno and Coach Jaret Pulido are also included as a Konsensya ng Bayan. It will form into three depends who will changed in an episode.

The show's first season was ended on June 6, 2014 with a new set of season season premiered on July 7, 2014, with Edu Manzano joining in as a new co-host and the show moved to its morning timeslot at 10:15 am.

The show is streaming online on YouTube, However, the content was unavailable in the country, only in the Philippines due to blocked for content.

== Final hosts ==
- Gelli de Belen (2013–14)
- Christine Bersola-Babao (2013–14; Happy Change Segment host)
- Edu Manzano (2014)

== Guest co-hosts ==
- Marvin Agustin (2014)

== Konsensya ng Bayan ==
- Atty. Persida Acosta (Public Attorney's Office head)
- Atty. Benedicto Acosta (University of the East College of Law Professor, husband of Atty. Persida)
- Atty. Karen Jimeno
- Dr. Camille Garcia
- Fr. Sonny Mérida
- Coach Jaret Pulido

== Censorship ==
All episodes of "Face the People" are censored, regardless of time.

Initially, mainly profanity was bleeped and pixelated, but later episodes were bleeped for explicit language, sometimes to such an exit. The audience is not allowed to shout anything that encourages or sustains violence among the guests.

Furniture may be pushed aside, but the chairs are purposely large to preclude their use as a weapon.

== See also ==
- List of TV5 (Philippine TV network) original programming
