= Talentadong Pinoy =

- Title card of Bangon Talentadong Pinoy (2020–2021)
- Genre: Reality show
- Written by: Paolo Bustamante
- Directed by: Rich Ilustre (2008-13); Monti Puno Parungao (2014)
- Presented by: Ryan Agoncillo (2008–2013, 2020–2021); Robin Padilla (2014); Mariel Rodriguez (2014); Tuesday Vargas (2014)
- Theme music composer: Ney Dimaculangan (first incarnation); Bryan Aquino
- Country of origin: Philippines
- Original language: Tagalog
- No. of seasons: 8

Production
- Executive producers: Malou Gascon (first incarnation); Ma. Theresa Cecilia R. Fortaleza (second incarnation); Robert P. Galang; Vitto P. Lazatin; Sienna G. Olaso; Isabel A. Santillan; Guido R. Zaballero
- Producers: TV5 Network; The IdeaFirst Company (2020–2021)
- Production locations: TV5 Studios, Quezon City (2008–2009); Sky Dome, SM City North EDSA, Quezon City (2010–2012); NBC Tent, Bonifacio Global City, Taguig City (2012–2013), TV5 Broadway Centrum (2014)
- Running time: 1 hour

Original release
- Network: TV5
- Release: August 16, 2008 – August 18, 2013
- Release: August 16 – December 13, 2014
- Release: August 15, 2020 – March 13, 2021

Talentadong Pinoy (transl. Talented Pinoy), also known as Bangon Talentadong Pinoy (transl. Get Up, Talented Pinoy for its eighth season) is a Philippine television reality competition show broadcast by TV5. Hosted by Ryan Agoncillo, it aired from August 16, 2008 to March 13, 2021, and was replaced by 1000 Heartbeats: Pintig Pinoy. The show it displays performances from singers, dancers, actors, musicians and comedians, to contortionists, impressionists, jugglers, ventriloquists and magicians. Contestants are allowed to perform any act they want.

== Overview ==
Talentadong Pinoy title card used on 2014

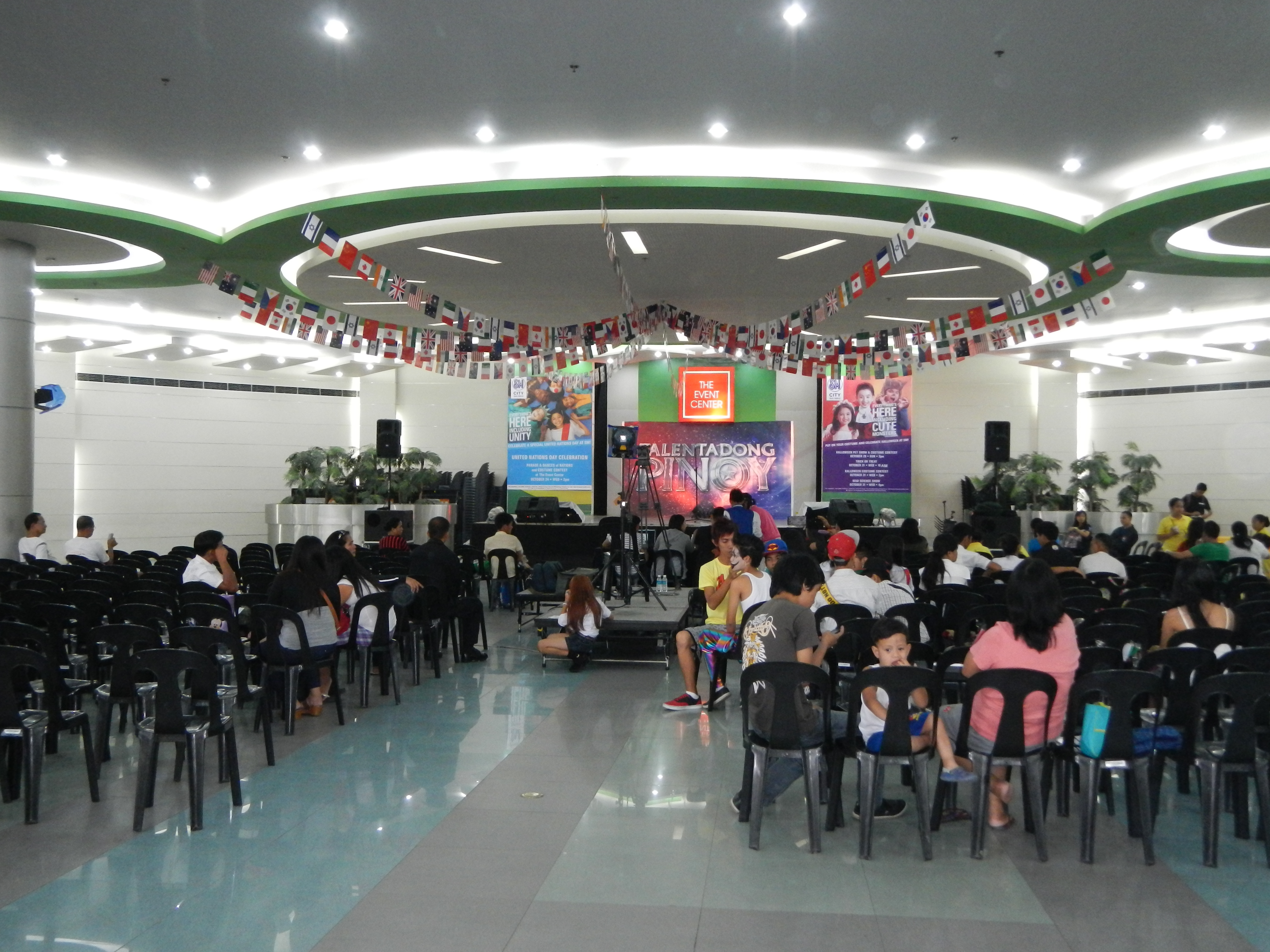
Talentadong Pinoy audition at SM City Baliwag in Baliuag, Bulacan

The show aims to display and advance performances considered as talented by the judges. The audition process is mostly held in SM locations all over the Philippines. The judging panel is composed of "talent scouts" (three famous persons who decide if the performers are passed on their performances) and the "jury" (composed of about eight to ten ordinary persons with professions or occupations and are the main judges in the contest). (If several contestants are passed by the talent scouts, the jury will decide who will become the winner. The jury is changed randomly in every show.)

The contestants perform on stage within 1 minute and 30 seconds. When the performers successfully do their act in that time, the bell rings, indicating that the contestant succeeded. If the talent scouts don't like the act, they simply press their respective buzzers and the curtain will be closed partially. When the contestants receive three strikes from the talent scouts, the curtain will be completely closed accompanied by the buzzer, notifying that the performer's act is terminated. Mostly seven competitors will compete if there is a defending champion; there are eight contestants if it is searching for a new defending champion. They will become the defending champion when the performer wins on the contest either by unanimous or split-decision by the jury. They must defend their title for five consecutive weeks against other performers. If they succeed in defending the title, the defending champion becomes a "Hall of Famer."

== Hosts ==
=== Final hosts ===
- Ryan Agoncillo (2008–2013; 2020–2021)

Talent Scouts

- John Arcilla (2020–2021)
- Janice de Belen (2020–2021)
- Joross Gamboa (2020–2021)

Guest talent scouts

- K Brosas (2020)
- John Lapus (2020–2021)
- Alessandra De Rossi (2020–2021)
- Tuesday Vargas (2021)
- Ruffa Gutierrez (2021)
- Cathy Garcia-Molina (2021)

=== Former hosts ===
- Robin Padilla (2014)
- Mariel Rodriguez (2014)
- Tuesday Vargas (2014; Audience and Backstage host)

== Seasons ==
=== Season 1 ===
In the first season, a contestant is hailed a "Hall of Fame" winner when he/she/they defend their title for five consecutive weeks.

Battle of the Champions was held at 7:30 pm, on March 6, 2010 at the Cuneta Astrodome. It was a competition for the seven Hall of Famers to become "Philippine's Ultimate Talentado" and Grand Prize of 1,000,000 pesos. Joining them is a "Wildcard Competitor", who is a failed Talentado with a chance to compete with the Hall of Famers. Jackielyn from Cavite was revealed In March 2010, as the Wildcard Competitor.

The criteria for judging consists of 50% text votes and 50% jury's decision (which was composed of 6-8 judges). Some notable contestants of Talentadong Pinoy appear on the intermission numbers of the Battle of the Champions. Yoyo Tricker was declared the First Ultimate Talentado and won for 1,000,000 pesos in cash. Jessa Joy Mendoza.

=== Season 2 ===
Following the first Battle of the Champions there were some changes on Talentadong Pinoy:

- The stage is now on 180-degree view.
- For a contestant to be part of the "Hall of Fame", they must defend their title for eight consecutive episodes.
- The color of the curtain is changed from black to red.
- There are now four talent scouts. They can now handle the decision of the contestants' performance.
- The criteria for judging is obtained by 1/3 from talent scouts and 2/3 from the jury.
- The after the talent scouts' evaluation the contestant's rating from the talent scout will be shown in four red bar graphs but the ratings' form the jury is in the one green bar which is not shown instead it display as a question mark.
- The program is aired on Saturdays and Sundays.

On March 12 and 13, 2011, the Battle of the Champions was held at Ynares Center, Antipolo City. A Celebrity Edition was announced to be held on the Grand Finals. Each celebrity will be accompanied by Season 1 Hall of Famers. Ciara Sotto (with Far East Acrobats) Winner, Valeen Montenegro (with The Tribal Dancers), Regine Tolentino (with Makata Tawanan), and Rosanna Roces (with Leah Patricio) will compete respectively. Joseph the Artist declared the Second Ultimate Talentado, taking home 1,000,000 pesos, a new car, four-year college scholarship, and a chance to represent the Philippines at the World Championships of the Performing Arts (WCOPA) to be held in Hollywood, USA. In addition to the major prizes, three contestants (including Joseph the Artist) won PHP 10,000 for being the Champion Detergent Bar's Kahanga-Hangang Performance Awardees.

=== Season 3 ===
Astroboy became the Third Ultimate Talentado in the Battle of the Champions held at the Quezon City Memorial Circle on May 6, 2012. He won P1 million cash with a brand new car. He was also given the opportunity to represent the country in the world Championship of the Performing arts (WCOPA) in Hollywood.

=== Season 4 ===
Talentadong Pinoy was revived in 2014 with Robin Padilla and Mariel Rodriguez as the new hosts. Meanwhile, Tuesday Vargas was added as the backstage

=== Season 5 ===
Talentadong Pinoy was revived by TV5 and Cignal TV in 2020 under its new title, Bangon Talentadong Pinoy. Agoncillo will return as a host for its revival season with talent scouts Joross Gamboa, Janice de Belen and John Arcilla, known as the "Triple J". The season is focusing on the talents who affected of the COVID-19 pandemic. The talents can be auditioned on its official Facebook page of Bangon Talentadong Pinoy.

=== Spin-offs ===
After Season 3 Battle of the Champions, Talentadong Pinoy launched new spin-offs aside from the current competition: Talentadong Pinoy Kids, Talentadong Pinoy International Edition, Talentadong Pinoy Worldwide and Talentadong Pinoy Junior.

== Hall of Famers/Battle of the Champions contestants/current champions ==
=== Season 1 ===
Key	First Ultimate Talentado

Rank	Professional Name	Hometown	Talent
1st Hall of Fame	Far East Acrobats	Pampanga	Acrobatics
2nd Hall of Famer	Wanlu	Rizal	Ventriloquism
3rd Hall of Famer	Yoyo Tricker (First Ultimate Talentado)	Quezon City	Yoyo Tricks
4th Hall of Famer	Tribal Dancers	Laguna	Fire dancing
5th Hall of Famer	Leah Patricio	Manila	Singing
6th Hall of Famer	Omar the Ladder Balancer	Marinduque	Ladder Tricks
7th Hall of Famer	Makata Tawanan	Bulacan	Poetry
Wildcard Grand Finalist	Jackielyn	Cavite	Singing

=== Season 2 ===
Key	Philippines Ultimate Talentado 2011	Champion Detergent Bar's Kahanga-Hangang Performance Awardees

Rank	Professional Name	Hometown	Talent
8th Hall of Famer	Beatbox Gor	Davao	Beatbox
9th Hall of Famer	The Believers	Muntinlupa	Musical Theatre
10th Hall of Famer	Joseph the Artist (Second Ultimate Talentado)	Laguna	Sand Art
11th Hall of Famer	New Born Divas	Quezon City	Singing trio
12th Hall of Famer	Sfazhiva (Ana Marie Garbo)	Caloocan	Pole dancing
13th Hall of Famer	Zion Show	Laguna	Acrobatics/Magic
14th Hall of Famer	Fire Attraction	Lahug, Cebu	Fire Poi
15th Hall of Famer	RR Friends	Naic, Cavite	Isolation Duo & Breakdance
Wildcard Grand Finalist	Belinda Adora's Step Kids	Antipolo, Rizal	Ballroom Dancing

1. Joseph the Artist originally lost to Cedie (singer/one-time defending champion). However, after the 8-win rule was implemented, Joseph was placed in the Hall of Fame having won nine times.

=== Season 3 ===
Rank	Professional Name	Hometown	Talent
16th Hall of Famer	Ayegee	Bukidnon	Singing
17th Hall of Famer	Melbelline	Bulacan	Kundiman-style Singing
18th Hall of Famer	Dancing Is Fun	Northern Samar	Ballroom Dancing
19th Hall of Famer	Craig & Samantha	New Jersey	Dancing
20th Hall of Famer	Astroboy (Third Ultimate Talentado)	Quezon City	Hula Hoop Dancing
21st Hall of Famer	Sustantivo	Quezon City	Pole Dancing
22nd Hall of Famer	Monica	Bulacan	Sand Art
Wild Card Contender	Rhyzza	San Mateo, Rizal	RNB Singing

1. Dancing is Fun won the "Make It or Break It" edition, a wildcard show competed by former champions who did not made the Hall of Fame.
2. Melbelline performed "waray-waray" with a modern twist, but later perform a kundiman as a request of a talent-scout

=== Talentadong Pinoy Kids Season 1 ===
Rank	Professional Name	Hometown	Talent
1st Hall of Famer	Baby Gymnast	Quezon City	Gymnastics
2nd Hall of Famer	Rein Pineda	Valenzuela	Kundiman-style Singing
3rd Hall of Famer	Gabe	Manila	Violin
4th Hall of Famer	Baby Josh	Nueva Ecija	Dancing
5th Hall of Famer	Sandugo Guardline (First Ultimate Talentado Kids)	Tondo, Manila	Flag Turners
6th Hall of Famer	Joshua De Villa	Batangas	Singing
7th Hall of Famer	DJ Explorer	Caloocan	Acrobat
8th Hall of Famer	Reborn of ES Dance Masters	Quezon	Dancing
9th Hall of Famer	Flex	Cavite	Dance
Wild Card Contender	Mary Heart	Iloilo	Singing

=== Talentadong Pinoy International Edition ===
Professional Name	Hometown	Talent
Edward Lava	Singapore	Singing
Miguel Antonio Vedanaigam	Singapore	Singing
Penny Salcedo (Fourth Ultimate Talentado)	Hong Kong	Singing
Liza Parantar	Hong Kong	Singing
Erick John Dizon	Dubai	Singing

=== Talentadong Pinoy Worldwide 2013 ===
Professional Name	Hometown	Talent
Rina Forbes	Canada	Singing
Haina	Middle East	Singing
Spyro Marco (Fifth Ultimate Talentado)	New York City	Diabolo trick
Nocturnal Dance Company	Quezon City	Dancing
Larvae	Davao	Gymnastics, Dancing
Sor Apao	Iligan City	Signing
Laserman	Malabon	Laser Act

- To enter the hall of fame must have 6 wins and defend the title.

=== Season 4 ===
Color keys

- - Ultimate Talentado season four
- - Hall of famer (Advanced to Finals)
- - Hall of famer from Robin's pick (Advanced to finals)

=== Semifinal 1 ===
Professional Name	Talent
Lights Production	Dancing with Lights
Mystique	Aerial Dancing
Crew Mechanix	Dancing
Empoy & Entoy Brothers	Comedy Prank
Madibeats	Beat Boxing
Street Voice	Singing
Tazmania	Dancing

=== Semifinal 2 ===
Professional Name	Talent
BMG Wheelchair Dancesport	Ballroom Dancing; handicapped
Bonfire	Fire Dancing
La Super Nova	Male Burlesque Dancers
John Paul	Singing
Neil Never Exit in Life	Rap Singing
Tsako Elastiko	Tsako Performing act

=== Wildcard ===
Professional Name	Talent
Escapades Blazing Color GD	Flag Turners / Majorettes
Amaya	Air Gymnast / Dancing
Fire Fury	Fire Dancing Act / Stunt Man
The Wire Man	Wire Act / Stunt Man
Fritzy Diva	Singing
Synchro Movers	Synchronized Dancing

=== Finals ===
Professional Name	Talent
Tazmania	Dancing
Mystique	Aerial dancing
Neil Never Exit in Life (Sixth Ultimate Talentado)	Human Beatboxing
BMG Wheelchair Dancesport	Handicapped Ballroom Dancing
Bonfire	Fire dancing Act / Poi
Amaya	Air Gymnastics
Escapades Blazing Color GD	Flag Turners

== Awards ==
=== KBP Golden Dove ===
- Winner, Best Talent Show (2009 & 2010)

=== MTRCB Awards ===
- Winner, Best Talent Show (2009)

=== PMPC Star Awards for TV ===
- Winner, Best Talent Search Program (2011)^
- Winner, Best Talent Search Program (2009)
- Winner, Best Talent Search Program Host (2009)
- Nominated, Best Talent Search Program & Host (2008, 2010 & 2011)
- Winner, Best Talent Search Program (2012)
- Winner, Best Talent Search Program (2013)

^ = tied with Showtime (ABS-CBN 2)

=== Catholic Mass Media Awards ===
- Winner, Best Entertainment Program (2012)
- Nominated, Best Talent Show (2008, 2009 & 2010)

=== USTv Students Choice Awards ===
- Nominated, Best Talent Show (2008 & 2009)

=== Gawad UP Gandingan TV Awards ===
- Nominated, Best Talent Show (2008 & 2009)

=== Guillermo Mendoza Box Office Entertainment Awards ===
- Winner, 2011 Best TV Program-Talent Search and Most Popular TV Director (Rich Ilustre)
- Winner, 2012 Most Popular TV Program Talent Search/Reality

=== ENPRESS ===
- Winner, Best Original TV-Program-Talent Search (2013)

== See also ==
- Kapatid Channel
- List of TV5 (Philippine TV network) original programming
- Pilipinas Got Talent
