= Face to Face (talk show) =

Philippine television talk show

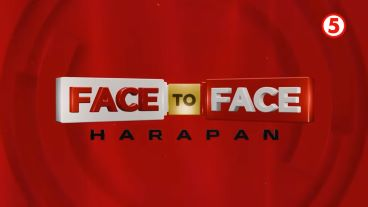
- Title card since 2024
- Also known as: Face to Face; Face 2 Face (F2F); Face to Face: Harapan; Face to Face with Ate Koring
- Genre: Tabloid talk show Public service
- Created by: TV5 Network, Inc.
- Directed by: Conci Flores (2010–2013); Frank Lloyd Mamaril (2023–24); John Paul Panizales (2024–25); Don Cuaresma (2025–present)
- Presented by: Korina Sanchez-Roxas
- Opening theme: "Face to Face" by Leah Patricio (2010–13; 2023–24) "Face to Face" by Marimar Tua (2024–26)
- Country of origin: Philippines
- Original language: Filipino
- No. of episodes: 1,219

Production
- Executive producers: Jane Jimenez-Basas (2023–26); Victorico P. Vargas (2026–present); Guido R. Zaballero; Vic del Rosario Jr.
- Producers: Sienna G. Olaso; Vicente R. del Rosario Jr.; Valerie S. del Rosario; Peter Edward G. Dizon
- Production locations: TV5 Studio A, Novaliches, Quezon City, Philippines (2010); Westside Studio, TV5 Broadway Centrum, Quezon City, Philippines (2010–2013); Studio 6, TV5 Media Center, Mandaluyong, Philippines (2023–present)
- Camera setup: Multiple-camera setup
- Running time: 45 minutes
- Production companies: TV5 Entertainment; MavenPro; Viktory 8 Media, Inc

Original release
- Network: TV5
- Release: March 22, 2010 – present
- Network: Kapamilya Channel; All TV 2
- Release: June 29, 2026 – present
- Network: RPTV
- Release: August 31, 2026 – present

Face to Face (formerly known as Face 2 Face or by its abbreviation F2F) is a Philippine television talk show broadcast by TV5, Kapamilya Channel, and All TV 2 with replays of the show's past episodes currently broadcast via RPTV. Originally hosted by Amy Perez, the show aired from March 22, 2010, to October 11, 2013. The show was revived from May 1, 2023 to October 18, 2024. Another relaunch the program, titled Face to Face: Harapan, aired from November 11, 2024 to March 13, 2026. Another version of the show, now titled Face to Face with Ate Koring, premiered on March 16, 2026. Korina Sanchez-Roxas currently serves as the host.

A spin-off drama anthology Untold Stories Mula sa Face to Face aired from September 2010 to September 2012.

== Overview ==
The program's premise is to televise a Barangay Hall, a small local government office where people take arguments to be heard by Tanods (Peacekeepers). The audience is meant to learn lessons from the complainant's problems and the solutions provided by the hosts and counselors.

Any citizen in the Philippines can file a complaint in Tagalog against someone in the Barangay Halls, which can become the basis for an episode. The production crew then sorts through the available records to choose which case to present and interviews both parties to provide additional background about the problem.

An episode begins with the host taking to the complainant, who is on the puti or white side, in-person to describe the problem. The Sawsaweros (male studio audience) and Sawsaweras (female studio audience) may ask questions or make statements, along with the persons originally involved. After an interview with the complainant, the opponent is brought on stage at the pula or red side, often resulting in an argument or even a fight on-stage. As the show progresses, both sides may bring in additional witnesses, to persuade the live audience. Before the guests appear on stage, they must undergo a security inspection for the safety of both arguing parties. In the first run, at most key points in the show, the host will ask the audience which side they are on, which is answered by the audience by raising signs with the colors for each side. In the second run, the host will ask the audience, and the audience uses a phone to vote on which side they are on, and the result shows on the screen. The stage crew are always prepared for confrontations and interdicted by two bouncers, while a production crew and security unit provide backup if more than two people are involved. In most cases, fight scenes are censored from the daytime edition of the show, but are shown in the primetime edition which is a 60-minute replay. The evening edition is inspected by the Movie and Television Review and Classification Board (MTRCB) before the broadcast and paramedics are available in case of serious injuries.

There are also three advisers, also known as Trio Tagapayo (or Harapang Tagapayo), who give guidance and advice to prevent fights. The panel is composed of a lawyer, a psychologist, and a priest, who give legal, psychological and spiritual advice to the two respective parties. Occasionally, the show invites an appropriate guest expert depending on the conflict involved.

The show sometimes ends with statements from the involved parties that they are willing to resolve the problem. Whether or not a resolution is given, the host provides her final comment on the issue. The show also conducts a follow-up to confirm if there is progress or not.

== History ==
Face to Face originally aired on TV5 on March 22, 2010. Amy Perez was the original host of the show. Actress Gelli de Belen also served as a substitute host during Perez's absence.

In July 2013, Perez resigned from the show for personal reasons. The program would later be developed into a different show, Face the People, which aired from October 2013 to November 2014.

Ten years later, the program was revived in 2023, with Cignal TV, Inc. producing the show. Karla Estrada served as the lead host. The revival version of the show aired on TV5 and One PH from May 1, 2023, to October 18, 2024. A reformatted version of the show, featuring broadcast journalist Korina Sanchez as the lead host, premiered on November 11, 2024. In March 2026, the program was reformatted as an informative talk show.

On June 29, 2026, the program expanded its airing to ABS-CBN Corporation's Kapamilya Channel and Kapamilya Online Live, along with AMBS' All TV. Not more than two months later, on August 31, 2026, the program's past episodes began taking over the 2:30 PM time slot and is aired via RPTV.

On October 2026, the show will be renamed as Gandang Mornings with Ate Koring.

== Hosts ==
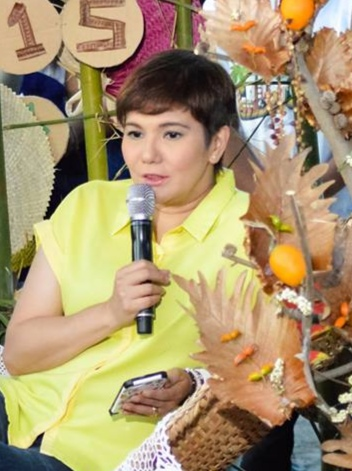
Amy Perez

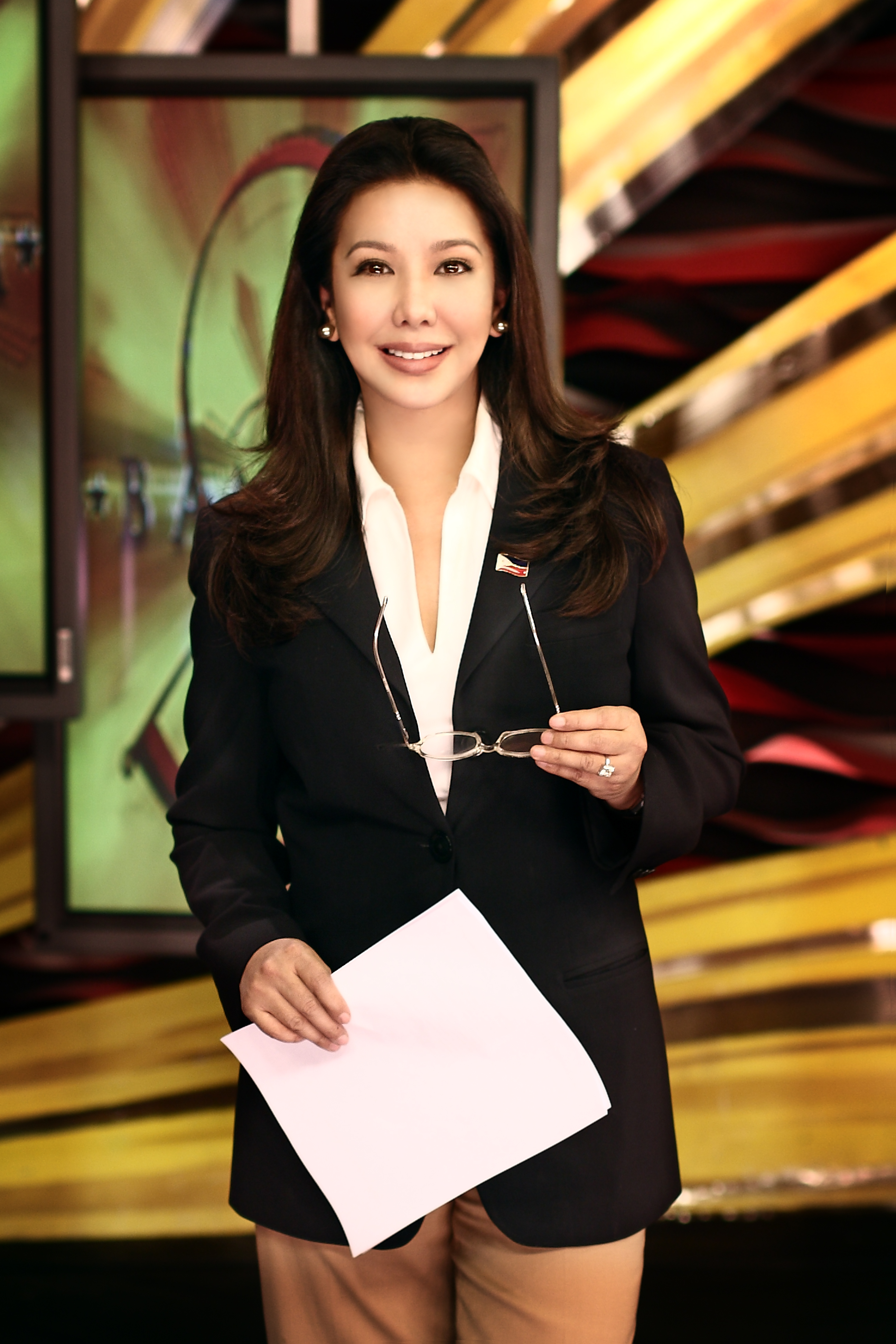
Korina Sanchez

=== Main ===
- Korina Sanchez-Roxas as Ate Koring (2024–present)
- Ryle Santiago (2024–present)
- Laila Chikadora (2026–present)
- Cheena Crab (2026–present)

=== Former ===
- Amy Perez-Castillo as Tyang Amy (2010–12; 2013)
- Hans Mortel† (2010–13)
- Persida Acosta (2010–11)
- Sonny Merida (2010–13)
- Camille Garcia (2010–13; 2023-24)
- Ben Acosta (2011–13)
- Gelli de Belen as Ateng Gelli (2012–13)
- Jun Banaag as Dr. Love (2023–2026)
- Karla Estrada as Mama Karla (2023–24)
- Alex Calleja (2023–24)
- Donita Nose (2024–25)
- Tuesday Vargas (subtitute host for Donita Nose, 2024; 2025–26)

=== Segments from Face to Face with Ate Koring ===
- 5K For You
- Baby Bibo
- Murayta Avenue
- Saan Tayo Next?
- K-arawan, K-siyahan
- Misis Wais
- Alagang Ate Koring
- Ate Koring's Sur-prize
- Ihain Na Yan

== Spin-off ==
Untold Stories Mula sa Face to Face (transl. Untold Stories From Face to Face) is a docudrama anthology broadcast by TV5. It is a dramatized re-enactment of actual stories that featured on Face to Face. The show aired from September 9, 2010, to September 29, 2012.

== Critical response ==
In reviewing the program, STIR Editor in Chief Edgar O. Cruz said "the back-of-the-mind thought is that joiners are acting since they are paid" and described portions as "not very believable" and "not realistic". He added that "the show gains more credibility points by being more spontaneous." While critics claim that the show is scripted, host Amy Perez claims that it is not.

== See also ==
- List of TV5 original programming
