= Gelli de Belen =

Filipino actress

Gelli de Belen-Rivera
- Born: Anna Gianelli Yap de Belen; May 25, 1973 (age 53); Quezon City, Rizal, Philippines
- Other names: G.D.B.; Ateng Gelli
- Occupation: Actress
- Years active: 1987–present
- Agent: Asian Artists Agencys
- Spouse: Ariel Rivera (m. 1997)
- Children: 2
- Relatives: Janice de Belen (sister); Kaila Estrada (niece)

Anna Gianelli Yap de Belen-Rivera, more commonly known as Gelli de Belen (born May 25, 1973), is a Filipino actress.

She is known for her role as a host of SiS, a daytime television program that ran on GMA Network from 2001 to 2010.

== Early life ==
The younger sister of actress and television presenter Janice de Belen, she began her career in show business at the age of 8. Her mother was heavily involved in her early career (where she was often included on set for tapings and shootings), and as a result, her reputation developed alongside Gelli de Belen's career.

== Personal life ==
de Belen married Filipino recording artist and actor Ariel Rivera on December 22, 1997. They have two children.

On March 19, 2016, her mother Susan de Belen died of cardiac arrest at the age of 67.

As of 2019, de Belen and her immediate family live primarily in Canada.

== Philanthropy ==
de Belen has a rare blood type of RH Negative which she regularly donates on Philippine Red Cross. She has been recognized as one of the Blood Galloners by the organization.

== Awards ==
Her role in the film Gagay: Prinsesa ng brownout earned her a nomination for Best Actress at the 1993 Manila Film Festival. In 1995, De Belen won the Gawad Urian Award for Best Actress for her portrayal of Sarah Jane Salazar in the movie The Secrets of Sarah Jane: Sana'y Mapatawad Mo, a biographical film about AIDS activist Sarah Jane Salazar.

== Filmography ==
=== Film ===
Year	Title	Role
1987	Puto	Mindy
1988	I Love You 3x a Day	Doro/Dora
1989	Ang Lahat ng Ito Pati Na ang Langit	
1989	Mars Ravelo's Bondying: The Little Big Boy	
1989	Aso't Pusa	
1989	Estudyante Blues	
1989	Dear Diary	Grace
1989	Wooly Booly: Ang Classmate Kong Alien	Girlie
1989	Imortal	Ivanna "Vanna" Quintania
1990	Tootsie-Wootsie: Ang Bandang Walang Atrasan	
1990	Love at First Sight	
1990	Paikot-Ikot	
1990	Tiny Terrestrial: The Three Professors	Nancy
1990	Petrang Kabayo 2: Ang Ganda-Ganda Mo	Cynthia
1990	Rocky n' Rolly	
1990	Humanap Ka ng Panget	Anna
1991	Pitong Gamol	Susan Salisi
1991	Andrew Ford Medina: Huwag Kang Gamol	Janice
1992	Magnong Rehas	Abigail
1992	Mahirap Maging Pogi	Gigi
1992	Apoy sa Puso	
1993	Astig	Jessa
1993	Gagay: Prinsesa ng Brownout	Gagay/Ringga
1993	Makuha Ka sa Tingin: Kung Puede Lang	Ana
1994	Pusoy	
1994	Iligpit si Victor Suzara	
1994	Ober Da Bakod: The Movie	Honey Grace
1994	The Secrets of Sarah Jane: Sana'y Mapatawad Mo	Sarah Jane
1995	Asero	
1995	Batas Ko ang Katapat Mo	Lerma
1995	Ikaw Lang ang Mamahalin (Camiguin)	
1996	Impakto	Rodora "Doray"
1996	Taguan	Yoyah
1996	Radio Romance	Veronica/Roni Night
1996	Ten Little Indians	Jeannie
1996	Ober Da Bakod 2: Da Treasure Adbentyur	Honey Grace
1997	Iskalawag	Grace
1997	Ikaw Pala ang Mahal Ko	Ria
1997	Sarraza	
1997	Ayos Lang Pare Ko	Chayong
1998	Walang Katumbas ang Dugo	
2000	Mahal Kita, Walang Iwanan	Cecille
2019	Ang Sikreto ng Piso	
2019	Pansamantagal	Agnes
2021	Love or Money	Tita Faye
2024	Road Trip	Maricar

=== Television ===
Year	Title	Role
1987	Palibhasa Lalake	Various
1992–1997	Ober Da Bakod	Honey Grace
1994–1998	Tropang Trumpo	Herself
1995–1998	'Sang Linggo nAPO Sila	Herself/hostess
2001–2010	SiS	Herself/hostess
2003–2006	Nuts Entertainment	Herself
2007	Impostora	Adelle Carreon
2008	Spoon	Herself / Guest
2009	All My Life	Amelia Estrada
2010	Panday Kids	Rosanna
2010	Zooperstars	Herself/hostess
2010	Jejemom	Bunny Castro
2010–2011	Bantatay	Marcella Enriquez-Razon
2011	Tweetbiz Insiders	Herself
2011	Spooky Nights: Bampirella	Mitch / Mamitch
2011	Gellicious	Herself/hostess
2011	Glamorosa	Caroline
2012	Nandito Ako	Teresa Dionisio
2012	Game 'N Go	Herself/hostess
2012	Third Eye	-
2012	Face to Face	Herself/hostess
2013	The Ryzza Mae Show	Herself / Guest
2013	Tropang Kulit	Herself
2013–2014	Face the People	Herself/hostess
2013–2015	Tropa Mo Ko Unli	Various
2014	Confessions of a Torpe	Luzviminda "Luz" Mabuti
2015	Solved na Solved	Herself/hostess
2015	Misterless Misis	Lisa
2015	Kris TV	Herself / Guest
2015	Tonight with Boy Abunda	Herself / Guest
2015	Maalaala Mo Kaya: Parol III	Renita
2015	Kapamilya, Deal or No Deal	Herself - Celebrity Player
2016	FPJ's Ang Probinsyano	Belinda Ojeda
2016	Celebrity Playtime	Celebrity Player of Team 90s
2016	Wansapanataym: That's My Toy, That's My Boy	Lena De Castro
2016	Magandang Buhay	Herself / Guest
2016–2017	Magpahanggang Wakas	Jenna Celis
2017–2018	It's Showtime	Herself / Guest Hurado
2017–2018	La Luna Sangre	Beatrice "Betty" Toralba-Domingo
2018	Tadhana: Masahol Pa sa Hayop	Carla
2018	Sarap, 'Di Ba?	Herself / Guest
2018	Sunday PinaSaya	Herself / Guest
2018	Idol sa Kusina	Herself / Guest
2018	Dear Uge: Merry Mamshies	Carol
2018–2019	Ika-5 Utos	Kelly San Diego-Manupil
2019	Magpakailanman: Arrest My Son's Rapist	Thelma
2019	Tonight with Boy Abunda	Herself/Guest
2019	Magandang Buhay	Herself/Guest
2019	Maalaala Mo Kaya: Simbahan	Agnes
2019	Ipaglaban Mo: Samantala	Lilet
2019	Dear Uge: This Yaya Is Mine	Rizalina
2019	Dahil sa Pag-Ibig	Editha Fajardo-Sandoval
2019	Beautiful Justice	Patty
2019	Dear Uge: Utang na naman	Angel de la Guardia
2020	It's Showtime	Herself / Guest Hurado
2020	Lunch Out Loud	Herself / Guest host
2021	Unloving U	Darlene Almeida
2021	It's Showtime	Guest Hurado for Reina ng Tahanan
2021	Magandang Buhay	Occasional Guest Ku-Momshie
2021	Puto	Mindy
2022	2 Good 2 Be True	Margielyn "Margie" Fajardo
2024	Si Manoy ang Ninong Ko	Host
2025	Lilet Matias: Attorney-at-Law	
2025	Pepito Manaloto: Tuloy ang Kuwento	Estelle Sandoval
2026	The Alibi: Ang Buong Katotohanan	Teresa Lopez
2026	The Good Doctor	

== Discography ==
- Gelli (Viva Records, 1991)
