= Gino Padilla =

Filipino singer (born 1964)

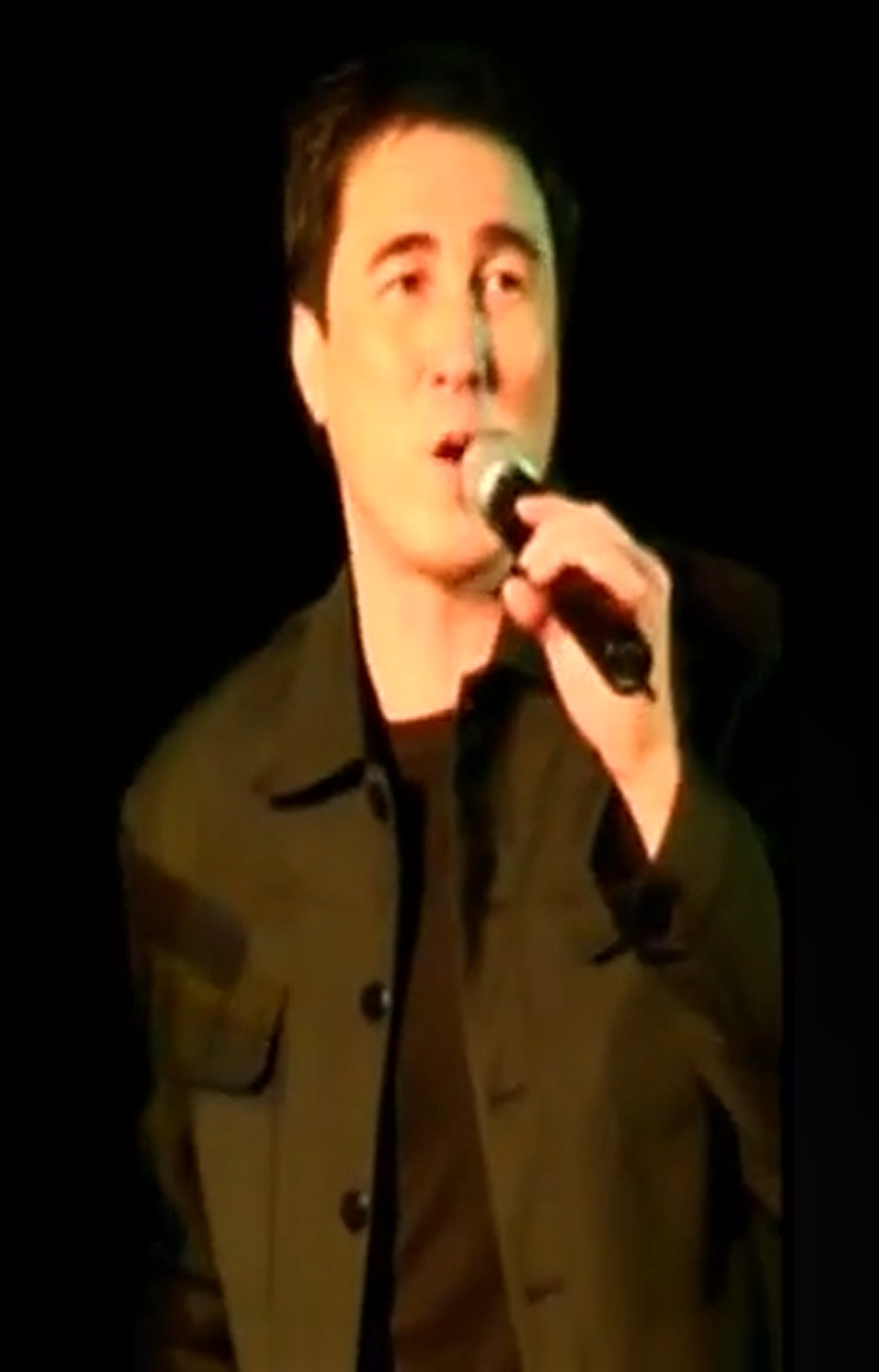
- Gino Padilla in 2009
- Born: Gino Padilla Javate; March 1, 1964 (age 62)
- Occupations: Singer; songwriter; actor; host
- Musical career
- Origin: Manila, Philippines
- Genres: OPM; pop
- Years active: 1986–present
- Labels: WEA; Universal Records; Vicor Music; Viva Artists Agency

Gino Padilla Javate (born March 1, 1964) is a Filipino OPM singer and songwriter. He is popular for the songs "Gusto Kita", "Closer You and I", "Let the Love Begin", and for his version of "Why Can't It Be". He has also hosted and guested on several TV shows and also performed the English dub versions of the opening and closing themes of several Dragon Ball Z films.

== Early life ==
Padilla was born into a family of actors and politicians. His mother, Melanie Padilla, is a former actress. His uncles are actors Rudy Fernandez and Robin Padilla (currently a senator), and his cousin is actress Zsa Zsa Padilla. His father, Virgilio Javate, separated from his mother, remarried, and relocated to the US.

== Career ==
In 1986, Padilla started out on his music career. At the age of 22, he got the opportunity to go to Hollywood to film a Pepsi commercial with Tina Turner. The commercial led to other projects.

Padilla was then featured on the song "You've Got the Power" alongside Randy Santiago and Juan Miguel Salvador. It was written by Tats Faustino and Gary Valenciano for the film Ninja Kids. The success of Ninja Kids led to him and Santiago becoming the hosts of Triple Treat alongside Keno and Regine Velasquez. In 1987, he recorded the duet "Let the Love Begin" with female singer Rocky, a cover of the song by Jimmy Demers and Carol Sue Hill from the 1986 film Thrashin'.

In 1991, Padilla translated the Indonesian song "Sesaat Kau Hadir" by Utha Likumahuwa into Tagalog, with the title of "Gusto Kita". It became popular, and has since been covered by many artists. The following year, he recorded a jingle for a commercial of the toothpaste brand Close-Up. Titled "Closer You and I", it featured music by Louie Ocampo and lyrics by Gina Tabuena-Godinez. The jingle was eventually expanded into a full song due to popular demand. The song became a hit, earning him the Awit Awards for Best Ballad Recording and Song of the Year. Until now, Close-Up continues to use that song for its commercials, with Sponge Cola and Adie updating that song for newer generations.

In 1996, Padilla got to interpret two songs from Dragon Ball Z, "Cha-la Head Cha-la" and "You Are the Hero", alongside the children's choir Age of Wonder for the album Dragon Ball Z: Songs of a High Spirited Saga - Volume I. He also got to perform those songs alongside Age of Wonder and play the role of Goku for the Dragon Ball Z play Dragon Ball Z: Myth, Magic, and Music.

During the early 2000s, he appeared on collaboration albums and on the bestselling prayerbook "Presence, Prayers For Busy People". He also made appearances in Santiago's concerts and performed at the 2006 Luna Awards. In 2007, he released a new album Gino Padilla: Hands of Time, which was produced by Sharon Cuneta. Two years later, he released another album, Let Me Be The One, which features English OPM songs.

Throughout the 2010s, Padilla was part of the Men of the 80's, a performing group with Santiago, Raymond Lauchengco and Louie Heredia. He was also cast in the 2014 film adaptation of ABNKKBSNPLAko?!. From 2016 to 2018, Padilla was one of the judges for the Wish 107.5 Music Awards.

Padilla continues to do concerts with Santiago and other 80's OPM artists. In 2023, he performed for the 76th anniversary of the Philippine Air Force. He is set to have a concert alongside Neocolours and Pops Fernandez in 2025.

== Personal life ==
Gino is married to Concepcion Canno, the daughter of a general. They have two children. He wrote his song "I Believe In You" for her. His son Josh was cast in the TV remake of Bagets in 2011. As a family, they own a security agency.

In 2002, his non-showbiz uncle, who was also named Gino Padilla, was kidnapped. Initially, news reports stated that the singer Gino Padilla was kidnapped. The singer Padilla assured the public that he was safe with his family. However, the uncle Padilla was murdered.

== Awards and nominations ==
Key
†	Indicates non-competitive categories

Award	Year	Recipient	Category	Result	Ref
Awit Awards	1992	Closer You and I	Best Ballad Recording	Won	
Awit Awards	1992	Closer You and I	Song of the Year	Won	
Awit Awards	2010	Why Can't It Be	Best Performance by a Male Recording Artist	Nominated	
Awit Awards	2010	Why Can't It Be	Best Ballad Recording	Nominated	
Gawad Dangal Filipino Awards	2024	Gino Padilla	Valuable Singing Icon of the Decade †	Won	

== Discography ==
Title	Album details	Certifications (sales thresholds)
Shifting Gears	Year: 1990; Label: WEA	
Silent Heart	Year: 1994; Label: Universal Records	
Gino Padilla: Hands of Time	Year: 2007; Label: Mega Music	
Let Me Be The One	Year: 2009; Label: Vicor Music	

=== Collaboration albums ===
- Kapayapaan
- The Power of Your Love: Only Selfless Love (Universal Records, 2002)
- Mga Misteryo ng Liwanag (2003)
- There's No Place Like Home (Wow Music, 2009)

=== Popular songs in chronological order ===
Padilla's songs include:

- 1986 – "You've Got the Power" ft. Randy Santiago & Juan Miguel Salvador
- 1987 – "I Believe in You"
- 1987 – "Let the Love Begin" ft. Rocky
- 1991 – "Gusto Kita"
- 1992 – "Closer You and I"
- 2002 – "Power of Your Love"
- 2009 – "Kaya Natin Ito!" ft. Various Artists
- 2009 – "Why Can't It Be?"

== Filmography ==
=== Film ===
Year	Title	Role	Ref.
1993	Lumaban Ka... Itay!		
2000	Eto Na Naman Ako	Dan June Hidalgo	
2014	ABNKKBSNPLAko?!	College Professor	

=== Television ===
Year	Title	Role	Notes	Ref.
1986–87	Triple Treat	Co-host	Alongside Randy Santiago, Keno, and Regine Velasquez	
2004	Sharon	Musical guest		
2005	SiS	Musical guest		
2008	Babangon Ako't Dudurugin Kita	As himself		
2008	Wowowee	Musical guest	Alongside Louie Heredia, Randy Santiago, and Raymond Lauchengco	
2009	Celebrity Duets: Philippine Edition	Musical guest	In Season 3	
2012	The X Factor Philippines	Musical guest	In Season 1	
2014	The Ryzza Mae Show	Musical guest		
2014–15	Strawberry Lane	Bustamante		
2015	The Singing Bee	Contestant	With Jett Pangan and Richard Reynoso	
2016	Magpakailanman			
2018, 23	I Can See Your Voice	Musical guest		
2019	Eat Bulaga!	Musical guest	For the segment Videoke Dabarclash	
