= Viva Films =

Filipino film production company

- Logo used since 2018
- Type: Subsidiary
- Industry: Film
- Founded: November 11, 1981; 44 years ago
- Founder: Vic del Rosario Jr.; Tess Cruz
- Headquarters: 7/F East Tower, Tektite Towers, Exchange Road, Ortigas Center, Pasig, Metro Manila, Philippines
- Area served: Worldwide
- Key people: Vic del Rosario Jr. (Executive producer, Chairman and CEO); Veronique del Rosario-Corpus (Film producer)
- Products: Motion pictures
- Services: Film distribution; Film promotion
- Parent: Viva Communications
- Divisions: Viva International Pictures
- Website: www.viva.com.ph

Viva Films, Inc. (also known as Viva Films, stylized as VIVA Films) is a Philippine film production and distribution company owned by Viva Communications. It was founded in 1981 by Vic del Rosario Jr. and his sister Tess Cruz. Viva Films is one of the largest film studios in the Philippines, along with Star Cinema, Regal Entertainment and GMA Pictures.

== History ==
=== Early years (1981–1988) ===
Veering away from the Sharon Cuneta-Gabby Concepcion tandem, Viva became home to quality dramatic films. The "glossy" production of films such as Sinasamba Kita, Palimos ng Pag-ibig, Saan Darating ang Umaga?, Kung Mahawi Man ang Ulap, and Paano Ba ang Mangarap? won critical and commercial acclaim. Viva Films also made a documentary film on the Puerto Rican boyband Menudo on their visit to the Philippines in 1985.

Viva launched then-supporting actor Phillip Salvador as an action star in the film Boy Negro. It was also instrumental in introducing to the public Robin Padilla (Bad Boy and Anak ni Baby Ama), and Raymart Santiago (Noel Juico: Batang Kriminal) as new action stars. Veteran action stars Eddie Garcia, Rudy Fernandez, Bong Revilla Jr., and Fernando Poe Jr., also made films for Viva.

Viva became later known as home to quality youth-oriented films, starting with the 1984 breakthrough flick, Bagets. The film was top billed by William Martinez and launched the careers of then unknowns J.C. Bonnin, Herbert Bautista, Raymond Lauchengco, and Aga Muhlach. With its box-office success, the company produced a sequel Bagets 2 with Ramon Christopher, Jon Hernandez, and Francis Magalona joining the original cast, the success of the two Bagets film made it the flagship film of Viva Films and it set the trend for youth-oriented films in the 1980s which other film companies copied, but they never matched nor equaled the success brought about by the two Bagets films.

Viva also made "glossy" comedy films like Working Girls (2010) and Sa Totoo Lang which featured serious actors and actresses as main characters instead of comedians. The company also gambled on new comedians as the '80s decade was about to end. Comedy flicks such as Puto, Jack en Jill, Humanap Ka ng Panget, and I Love You 3x a Day launched the respective careers of Herbert Bautista, Andrew E. and Jimmy Santos.

=== Heyday (1989–2003) ===
In 1989, Viva introduced its second batch of young stars via the youth-oriented comedy Estudyante Blues. It introduced to the public young stars and That's Entertainment mainstays such as Vina Morales, Gelli de Belen, Keempee de Leon, Raymart Santiago and Dingdong Avanzado. The film was also a resounding success, despite the fact that Estudyante Blues became an earlier hit via the Philippine music airwaves as a single sung by Freddie Aguilar.

In the 1990s, Viva launched the careers of Dennis Padilla and Janno Gibbs as solo comedians while reviving the film careers of veteran comedians Redford White (Neber 2 Geder), Chiquito (Pinagbiyak Na Bunga) and Joey de Leon (Hibangers).

Viva later on entered into television production by partnering with GMA Pictures. Their first venture together was the sitcom Ober Da Bakod in 1992 with then rising young talents Donita Rose, Gelli de Belen, and Janno Gibbs and Anjo Yllana as main stars, followed by the soap opera Villa Quintana in 1994 with Donna Cruz and Keempee de Leon as lead stars. However, it was the 1995 youth-oriented series T.G.I.S. that gave Viva its biggest success as a television producer. Headlined by Angelu de Leon, it gave birth to the careers of Bobby Andrews, Michael Flores, Onemig Bondoc, Red Sternberg, Raven Villanueva and Ciara Sotto. The success of the TV series was later translated to the big screen, when the T.G.I.S. group became box-office stars via the films Takot Ka Ba sa Dilim? and TGIS the Movie. A new batch of teens were introduced a few months later, and was led by Dingdong Dantes, Anne Curtis, Sunshine Dizon (previously credited as "Sunshine"), Kim Delos Santos, Antoinette Taus, Polo Ravales, Dino Guevarra and Chubi del Rosario.

In 1996, Viva Films had the highest number of films produced out of all the major studios in the country, producing 35% of all local films in 1995–1996.

=== Decline (2004–2010) ===
Viva Films had the lowest number of films produced among all major film studios in the Philippines for the year 2004, producing only four: Annie B., Masikip sa Dibdib: The Boobita Rose Story, Kulimlim and Lastikman: Unang Banat, all of which were only moderate box-office successes. Due to stiff competition, they focused on digital films and distribution the following year.

In late 2006, Viva Films returned to mainstream movie production through co-producing with the film outfits owned by the giant networks: Star Cinema (owned by ABS-CBN Corporation) and GMA Pictures (owned by GMA Network, Inc.) while producing films by themselves from time to time. Their first two comeback mainstream films were Till I Met You (with GMA Pictures) and Wag Kang Lilingon (with Star Cinema). From 2009 to 2010, Viva produced films which were considered firsts: Patient X marks the first Viva movie of Richard Gutierrez and Cristine Reyes after the latter signed a contract with Viva Entertainment, while Working Girls marks the first Viva film of the first Starstruck female winner Jennylyn Mercado after she signed a contract with Viva Entertainment.

=== Continued success (2011–2020) ===
In 2011, Tumbok, Catch Me, I'm in Love, No Other Woman, The Unkabogable Praybeyt Benjamin, Won't Last a Day Without You (all co-produced by Star Cinema), were released. In 2012, Of All the Things (co-produced by GMA Films), Moron 5 & the Crying Lady (co-produced by MVP Films) and A Secret Affair were released.

In 2013, Bekikang: Ang Nanay Kong Beki, It Takes a Man and a Woman, Momzillas, and Girl, Boy, Bakla, Tomboy (all co-produced by Star Cinema) were released. In 2014, Diary ng Panget, Trophy Wife and Muslim Magnum .357: To Serve and Protect were released.

In 2015, Felix Manalo, a biopic of the Iglesia ni Cristo founder, was released in October.

On March 13, 2019, Viva Communications joined the local-language film consortium Globalgate Entertainment, which is led by American mini-major film studio Lionsgate.

=== Vivamax and online streaming activities (2021–present) ===
On January 29, 2021, Viva Films released an online video streaming site called VMX, formerly known as Vivamax, conceptualized and overseen by Viva Communications chairman and CEO Vic del Rosario, which aims to provide online viewing for their movies such as Maybe This Time, Kita Kita, and Sanggano, Sanggago’t Sanggwapo. Vivamax released a wide variety of titles, ranging from comedy, horror, and erotica in the form of films and series. Viva also released a separate streaming service called Viva One (formerly Viva Prime) featuring family films aimed at a broader audience. While Vivamax quickly gained a reputation as a purveyor of softcore pornography, Viva COO Vincent del Rosario dismissed such allegations and claimed that their adult content makes up only ten percent of their streaming library. VMX's library of erotic content was also criticized by senator Jinggoy Estrada who called out the streaming service for allegedly allowing younger audiences easy access to "sexy contents" with no redeeming value, amid calls for the Movie and Television Review and Classification Board (MTRCB) to expand its scope for them to enforce ratings on online streaming services.

Starting in 2022, Viva produced a number of films which were released every week online through Vivamax, which was later rebranded as VMX as it reached a significant milestone of 12 million subscribers in October 2024.

== Highest-grossing films ==
Highest-grossing films by Viva Films^{[HGF]}
Rank	Title	Year	Box-office gross (in estimated amount)	Notes	Ref.
1	Maid in Malacañang	2022	₱650 million	co-produced with VinCentiments	
2	Fantastica	2018	₱596 million	co-produced with Star Cinema	
3	Gandarrapiddo: The Revenger Squad	2017	₱571 million	co-produced with Star Cinema	
4	Miracle in Cell No. 7	2019	₱543 million		
5	Beauty and the Bestie	2015	₱526 million	co-produced with Star Cinema	
6	The Amazing Praybeyt Benjamin	2014	₱455 million	co-produced with Star Cinema	
7	Un/Happy for You	2024	₱450 million	co-produced with Star Cinema	
8	Girl, Boy, Bakla, Tomboy	2013	₱421 million	co-produced with Star Cinema	
9	Sisterakas	2012	₱393 million	co-produced with Star Cinema	
10	It Takes a Man and a Woman	2013	₱387 million	co-produced with Star Cinema	

^{HGF}Earnings of the film listed in the box-office gross with an estimated amount is not the accurate total gross of the film. Some articles and reports even the production company itself are giving different amounts of gross and not revealing its actual amount. In this case, the estimated gross amount shown above is from the sources that has a similar report of the gross.

== Viva Films on television ==
During the early 1980s, Viva tied up with IBC to air their early releases every Saturday night. The movie block, titled Viva Box Office Hits, showed early movies of Sharon Cuneta and Gabby Concepcion and other early releases by the company, In March 1988, Viva Box Office Hits was one of the Viva shows that transferred to ABS-CBN (along with The Sharon Cuneta Show) after its original home IBC was sequestered by the Aquino administration. Despite Viva Box Office's cancellation on February 16, 1989, succeeding films produced by Viva Films and its subsidiaries continued to air on ABS-CBN through the network's movie blocks Tagalog Movie Greats and Star Cinema Presents until 1992.

In 1992, Viva switched networks by partnering with GMA Network where their latest film releases starting in 1991 onwards were shown every Thursday night. The movie block was renamed Viva Sinerama which ended on January 6, 2002. The said partnership initially caused controversy after former media partner ABS-CBN filed an injunction to block the partnership as the network launched their own motion picture company Star Cinema a year later. The said injunction affected the airing of the 1991 box-office hit Maging Sino Ka Man which was supposed to be Viva's maiden offering on Viva Sinerama. After the court decided in favor of the Viva-GMA partnership, the said movie finally aired after six months. It was also during the GMA era that Viva aired another movie block on Monday nights called MVP (Monday Viva Presentations) on August 15, 1994, primarily to compete with ABS-CBN's then top-rating movie block Regal Presents, which later moved to Tuesdays as Tuesday Viva Presentation from 1997 to 1998.

During the new millennium, Viva diversified its film library where it was aired randomly on IBC (via Viva TV primetime block) and ABC (now TV5) (via the Viva Box Office and Viva Cine Idols movie block).

From free TV, Viva was able to tie up with Star TV and Fox International Channels Philippines to create an all-Filipino international movie channel on May 6, 1996, called Viva Cinema. Viva Cinema aired over 300 movies coming from the Viva library, including the latest releases. It also aired behind-the-scenes outtakes and refreshing entertainment shows. The partnership between Viva and Star TV ended on July 31, 2003, after Viva acquired the remaining stake of the channel from Star TV and when Viva created its movie channel, PBO (Pinoy Box Office) and entrusted the entire Viva movie library to ABS-CBN by allowing it to air over. Viva Prime Channel airs mostly action and Drama movies at 7:00 p.m. only every other week of the month. Viva Cinema returned on February 1, 2009 along with the launch of Philippine DTH's Cignal Digital TV of the same month. Aside from Viva entrusting the entire Viva library to ABS-CBN, co-productions of Viva and Star Cinema are also aired exclusively via ABS-CBN's movie block Kapamilya Blockbusters and S+A's movie blocks Action Movie Zone and Lunch Blockbusters, and via Viva Cinema, Viva Prime Channel, and PBO. While co-productions of Viva and GMA Films are exclusively aired via GMA's movie blocks Kapuso Movie Festival and/or Kapuso Movie Night, GMA News TV's movie block Takilya Blockbusters, and via Viva Cinema, Viva Prime Channel, and PBO.

For overseas markets, Cinema One Global (owned by ABS-CBN) also aired Viva Films productions for its overseas Filipino audiences.

In 2015, Viva partnered with TV5 to provide entertainment content. This transpired after the TV network dissolved its entertainment department to make room for blocktimers and content providers. It is said that Viva will be the biggest content contributor to the network. However, its partnership with TV5 took a break in late 2016 as former Gilas Pilipinas and PBA head coach, Vicente "Chot" Reyes took over as president and CEO of TV5 which Reyes focused in sports and news programming on TV5 until he resigned in June 2019 due to negative feedbacks by the viewers and fans of the network's entertainment programming against Reyes.

On May 10, 2021, after Cignal TV took over the TV5 Network's management and operations (and Viva resurrected its partnership with TV5 for the overall programming), TV5/Cignal and Viva through the Sari-Sari Channel announced that TV5 will air a Viva weekly movie block under the Sari-Sari Presents Viva Cinema banner, similar to the now-defunct Viva Sinerama on GMA which began on May 15, 2021, every Saturday afternoon. On October 31, 2021, the Sine Spotlight block on Sunday evenings aired films produced by Viva from the early to mid-2010s and since May 2022 until early 2023 older action films produced by Viva; competitor studio Star Cinema (under ABS-CBN Corporation) assumed the co-production and partnership duties for the block from February to May 2022. On August 1, 2021, Viva reverted its secondary cable-only network, Viva TV, back to Viva Cinema with older films produced and distributed by Viva until 2001 (since August 2026) in the new iteration, along with concerts produced by sister company Viva Live; the former had been merged with the company's TV production unit. PBO is set to target broadcasting films from 2002 onwards in the coming years.

From September 17, 2022 to April 12, 2024, some of most Viva's classic Filipino movies began to air on All TV Channel 2, a free-to-air and cable television network owned by Advanced Media Broadcasting System via the All Flix movie block which airs daily. All of these are later moved into TV5 since October 21, 2024 via the Cine Cinco sa Umaga, Cine Cinco sa Hapon (since July 14, 2025, also simulcasted on RPTV since October 6 at the same year), Cine Cinco Weekend Saya (in which also simulcasted on RPTV since August 9, 2025, thus marking the return of Viva-produced and distributed content to RPN, where it had aired previously) and Cine Cinco Astig Sunday movie block.

== Viva International Pictures ==
Viva International Pictures
- Type: Division
- Industry: Film
- Founded: November 18, 1998; 27 years ago
- Founder: Vic del Rosario Jr.
- Headquarters: 7/F East Tower, Tektite Towers, Exchange Road, Ortigas Center, Pasig, Metro Manila, Philippines
- Area served: Philippines
- Key people: Vic del Rosario Jr. (Chairman and CEO)
- Products: Motion pictures
- Services: Film distribution
- Owner: Viva Communications
- Parent: Viva Films

Viva International Pictures (VIP) is a division of Viva Films that distributes Hollywood, European and Asian movies. It is headed by the chairman and CEO, Vic del Rosario Jr. VIP is the official partner of MVP Entertainment, a subsidiary of Multivision Plus.

== P1.1-billion IPO ==
In January 2008, Viva chairman Vic del Rosario announced that Viva Communications expected to raise P1.1 billion through approval of the initial public offering (IPO) by the Philippine Stock Exchange, on listing date of March 5. It planned to sell up P 92.8 million new shares and P 49.9 million secondary shares at P 12.93 / share (offer is 35% of the company's issued and outstanding capital stock). It appointed Banco de Oro (BDO) Capital and Investment Corporation as lead underwriter and Abacus Capital and Investments Corporation as co-lead underwriter. Viva's net income was P 121 million for January to October 2007, double its 2006 earnings and projects net profit of P 330 million this year.

== Former subsidiaries ==
- Viva Family Entertainment - A family-oriented film outfit that existed from 1994 to 1995.
- Neo Films - A film outfit that existed from 1995 to 1998, with a brief revival from 2002 to 2003. Initially headed by Eric Cuatico, Vincent III and Veronique took over the helm in 1997 after Cuatico left for rival film company Star Cinema.
- Falcon Films - A film outfit that existed from the 1980s to 1998. Some of its films under the banner were produced by Allan Gilbert of ATB-4 Films.

== See also ==
- Sine Novela – films of Viva Films remade by GMA Network for afternoon drama in television from April 2007 via Sinasamba Kita to June 2010 via Gumapang Ka Sa Lusak.
- Babangon Ako't Dudurugin Kita – a non-Sine Novela created by Gilda Olvidado and Viva Films, remade by GMA Network for primetime drama on GMA Telebabad.
