= Louie Heredia =

Filipino singer (born 1964)

- Born: July 3, 1964 (age 62)
- Education: Notre Dame de Namur University
- Occupations: Singer; host
- Musical career
- Origin: Manila, Philippines
- Genres: OPM; pop
- Years active: 1985–1999, 2008–2011
- Label: Vicor Music

Louie Tuason Heredia (born July 3, 1964) is a Filipino retired singer. He was popular in the 1980s and 90s for the songs "Nag-iisang Ikaw", "Iisang Damdamin", "Una’t Huling Mamahalin", and "Can't Find No Reason". He has also hosted and guested on several TV shows.

== Early life ==
Louie was born on July 3, 1964 to Consuelo del Rosario Tuason and Angel Heredia. His mother was part of the Tuason clan, one of the wealthiest clans in the country. She would then remarry Vic Reyes. As a child, he guested on the television show Two for the Road. He took up business management at Notre Dame de Namur University in Belmont, California, and graduated cum laude in 1987.

== Career ==
When he was 18 years old, Heredia was discovered by composer Cecile Azarcon at a dinner hosted by the consul general of San Francisco. At the dinner, he sang a composition of Azarcon's "Lift Up Your Hands".

Heredia returned home to the Philippines in 1985. He made another guest appearance on Two for the Road. Vic del Rosario, from Vicor Music, was watching that episode. The following day, he got Heredia to sign a recording contract with Vicor Music. His first recording was “Can Find No Reason”. In 1986, he released his debut album From Another Place and Another Time. The album also included several songs that he wrote himself, “New Horizons” and “Remember". After the album's promotion, he took a break from singing to finish his studies in the US.

When Heredia returned, Vicor gave him a new single to record, "Nag-iisang Ikaw", which was composed by Vehnee Saturno and made specifically for him. Initially, he did not want to record that song, as he found it to be "baduy (in poor taste)". Vicor then threatened to release him from his contract if he did not record, so with Saturno's help, he recorded the ballad. "Nag-iisang Ikaw" went on to become the lead single of his 1989 album, Para Sa ‘Yo, and that album was then certified double platinum. The album also included the songs "Iisang Damdamin" and "Sa Habang Panahon", the latter which he wrote and recorded himself.

Heredia also became a television show host. In 1987, he got his first hosting gig as a temporary host on GMA's The Penthouse Live alongside Edu Manzano and Kris Aquino. For two Sundays, they filled in for Martin Nievera and Pops Fernandez. ABS-CBN then offered him his own tv show Lots to Catch. He then hosted Lunch Date on GMA from 1991 to 1993. Although he had offers to star in movies, he turned them down, as his manager wanted him to be known as a singer.

After releasing Nag-iisang Ikaw in 1994, Heredia went on a two-year self-imposed hiatus. By this time, Heredia thought of quitting the music industry and taking a broadcasting course abroad. He put those plans on hold when Vicor approached him with the offer to record another album. In 1996, he made his return with the single "Una at Huling Mamahalin". The following year, he released his comeback album, Una at Huling Mamahalin. The album went on to be certified gold, marking his return.

In 1998, Heredia sang at the opening of the Metropolitan Basketball Association's first season. He then released what would be his final album Kung Magmahal, which included the inspirational song "Huwag Kang Mangamba". However, the album did not sell as well as previous albums, since it was caught between the rivalry of Star Music and GMA Music. With the music scene changing, he decided to retire.

Throughout the late 2000s and early 2010s, Heredia made a brief return to showbusiness as he did several shows as part of the Men of the 80's, a performing group with Santiago, Raymond Lauchengco and Gino Padilla. He also made an appearance in the Hollywood film Accepted.

== Personal life ==
Heredia previously dated Dyan Castillejo, a former tennis player and sports journalist. He is a cousin of former Pampanga vice-governor Mikey Arroyo.

Heredia is a beauty contest enthusiast. He was neighbors with Laura Lehmann, and helped start her beauty pageantry career by connecting her with well-known people in the beauty pageant industry. He is also friends with Anne Jakrajutatip, the owner of Miss Universe Organization. In 2018, he was one of the judges of Miss World Philippines 2018. In 2025, he joined the Miss Universe 2025 selection committee after several judges backed out.

After retiring, Heredia made time for other hobbies, such as cooking pastas, paellas, and Thai dishes, which he then turned into a business. He has also supported and donated to various causes, such as animal welfare. He lives with his two cats in Tagaytay City, and often travels to Thailand.

== Discography ==
Title	Album details	Certifications (sales thresholds)
From Another Place and Another Time	Year: 1986; Label: Vicor Music	
Para Sa ‘Yo	Year: 1989; Label: Vicor Music	Double platinum
Damdamin	Year: 1991; Label: Vicor Music	
'Di Mapalagay	Year: 1993; Label: Vicor Music	
Nag-iisang Ikaw	Year: 1994; Label: Vicor Music	
Una at Huling Mamahalin	Year: 1997; Label: Vicor Music	Gold
Kung Magmahal	Year: 1998; Label: Vicor Music	

=== Compilation albums ===
- Greatest Hits of the 80s

=== Popular songs in chronological order ===
Heredia's songs include:

- 1986 – "Can Find No Reason"
- 1989 – "Nag-iisang Ikaw"
- 1989 – “Iisang Damdamin”
- 1989 – “Pinakamamahal”
- 1996 – "Una at Huling Mamahalin"
- 1998 – "Kung Magmahal"

== Filmography ==
=== Television ===
Year	Title	Role	Notes	Ref.
1985	Two for the Road	Musical guest		
1987	The Penthouse Live	Substitute host		
1991	Lots to Catch	Host		
1991–93	Lunch Date	Co-host	Alongside Randy Santiago, Lito Pimentel, and Toni Rose Gayda	
2004	Sharon	Musical guest		
2006	MYX Live	Himself		
2008	Wowowee	Musical guest	Alongside Gino Padilla, Randy Santiago, and Raymond Lauchengco	
2018	I Can See Your Voice	Guest artist		
