= Kamagong (film) =

Philippine action drama film

- Directed by: Carlo J. Caparas
- Screenplay by: Carlo J. Caparas; Rene Villanueva
- Story by: Carlo J. Caparas
- Produced by: Ramon Salvador
- Starring: Lito Lapid; J.C. Bonnin; Ruel Vernal
- Cinematography: Sergio Lobo
- Edited by: Ike Jarlego Jr.
- Music by: Ricky del Rosario
- Production company: Viva Films
- Distributed by: Viva Films
- Release date: February 4, 1987
- Running time: 105 minutes
- Country: Philippines
- Language: Filipino

Kamagong is a 1987 Philippine action drama film written and directed by Carlo J. Caparas. The film stars Lito Lapid, J.C. Bonnin and Ruel Vernal. The film involves the use of a martial arts sport called arnis.

The film is streaming online on YouTube.

== Plot ==
Ariel (Bonnin) perfects his skills in arnis and his idol Manuel (Lapid) made him rediscover what it takes to be a man.

== Cast ==
- Lito Lapid as Manuel
- J.C. Bonnin as Ariel Salgado
- Eddie Garcia as Mr. Guevarra
- Ruel Vernal as Lorenzo Montero
- Mia Pratts as Belen
- Bong Dimayacyac as Melissa
- Dencio Padilla as Dencio
- Jaime Fabregas as Cenon Beltran
- Beth Bautista as Tarsila
- Julio Diaz as Emilio Salgado
- Mario Escudero as Rufo
- Sabatini Fernandez as Sutero
- Bomber Moran as Taber
- Ernie Zarate as Chavez

== Animated adaptation ==
An anime-influenced animated adaptation of the film was announced in 2018. It will be produced by Sinag Animation Studios. The production was reportedly in the works in 2019, with the release of a trailer and an animated music video for its theme song "Ako'y Magwawagi" (transl. "I'll Win"). However, it experienced issues due to the COVID-19 pandemic. As of 2023, its status is currently unknown.
