= Menchu Lauchengco-Yulo =

Filipina actress

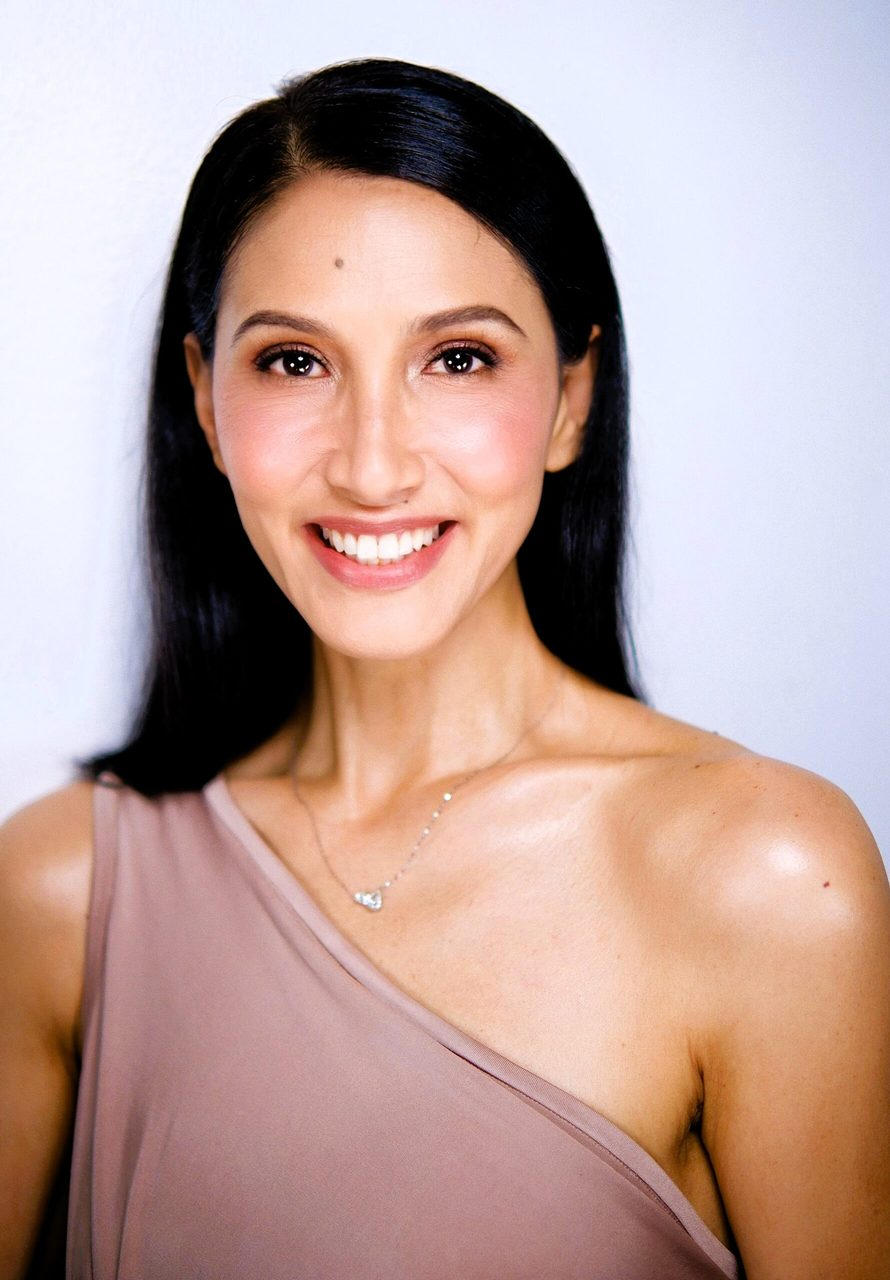
- Born: Menchu Lauchengco; July 7, 1963 (age 63)
- Education: St. Scholastica's College Manila, De La Salle University, Santa Isabel College
- Occupations: Actress; singer; director; artistic director
- Years active: 1978–present
- Spouse: Jose Luis Yulo
- Children: 2
- Relatives: Raymond Lauchengco (brother)

Menchu Lauchengco-Yulo (born July 7, 1963) is a Filipina actress widely regarded by the media as the "first lady" of Philippine musical theatre. She is well known for her roles as Diana Goodman in Next to Normal and Mrs. Lovett in Sweeney Todd. Lauchengco-Yulo is an Aliw Award recipient, among other accolades. She is also the artistic director for Newport World Resorts (formerly Resorts World Manila) and a founding member of Actor's Actor Inc.

Menchu Lauchengco-Yulo is the sister of balladeer Raymond Lauchengco.

== Career ==
Menchu Lauchengco-Yulo first entered theatre at 15 years old, auditioning for Repertory Philippines in a production of The King and I with her brother, Raymond Lauchengco. Being too old to be child but too young to be a wife, she did not get in. Her next audition was in 1978 for Fiddler on the Roof, where she was part of the chorus. In 1980, she auditioned for the role of Luisa, the 2nd daughter of Captain Von Trapp in The Sound of Music. However, the directors had a different part for her in mind and gave her the role of Liesl. This role gave Menchu her first solo performance.

After this production, she landed a string of roles as part of the chorus. It was after being given the role of Maria in West Side Story that her star started shining again. The West Side Story production was a success, but once again returned to doing chorus.

She starred as Maria in the Repertory Philippines The Sound of Music, where she received critical acclaim. Her other theatre credits under Repertory Philippines include lead roles in Man of La Mancha, The Secret Garden, Kiss of the Spiderwoman, Oliver!, The Baker's Wife, Company, Passion, Evita, Camelot, Les Miserables, Into the Woods, Scrooge, A Chorus Line, Once A Catholic, Present Laughter, The Little Foxes, Amadeus, Arsenic and Old Lace, and The Rose Tattoo.

She starred in the productions of Once On This Island, The Last Five Years and Love Letters for Actor's Actor Inc.

Her role in The Lion The Witch and The Wardrobe for Trumpets Inc. earned her an Aliw Award nomination.

Her roles for Atlantis Productions include Proof (where she earned another Aliw Award nomination), Dreamgirls, Baby, and Nine. Menchu played the role of Ellen in the 2000 Manila production of Miss Saigon, also to critical acclaim. Into the Woods marks her New Voice Company theatre debut.

Menchu is the associate artistic director for Repertory Philippines, filling the shoes of Joy Virata. Her directorial debut was West Side Story in 2008, and other works include Little Women, Peter Pan and Jekyll & Hyde.

She has done numerous concerts, TV shows and live performances. Aside from starring in theatre productions, Menchu also gives workshops for acting and musical theatre.

== Achievements ==
- Aliw Awards Nominee for Best Actress for Proof
- Aliw Awards Nominee for Best Actress for The Lion, The Witch and The Wardrobe
- Aliw Awards Best Actress for Next to Normal

== Recording ==
Menchu Lauchengco-Yulo released her first album entitled Light with Atlantis Productions & Sony Music.
