= Bagets =

- VCD cover of the film
- Directed by: Maryo J. de los Reyes
- Written by: Jake Tordesillas
- Produced by: Vic R. Del Rosario Jr.; Ramon Salvador
- Starring: William Martinez; J.C. Bonnin; Herbert Bautista; Raymond Lauchengco; Aga Muhlach
- Cinematography: Joe Batac Jr.
- Edited by: Ike Jarlego Jr.
- Music by: Ricky Del Rosario
- Production company: Viva Films
- Release date: February 2, 1984
- Running time: 116 minutes
- Country: Philippines
- Language: Filipino

Bagets [bɐˈɡets] (lit. 'Teens') is a 1984 Philippine coming-of-age comedy film directed by Maryo J. de los Reyes from a story and screenplay written by Jake Tordesillas. The film stars William Martinez, J.C. Bonnin, Herbert Bautista, Raymond Lauchengco, and Aga Muhlach as the titular teenagers, with the support cast includes Jobelle Salvador, Eula Valdez, Yayo Aguila, and Chanda Romero.

Produced and distributed by Viva Films, the film was theatrically released on February 2, 1984. It became a success for the film studio which spawned a sequel, a television remake, and a musical adaptation.

== Plot ==
The movie focuses on the lives of five young boys – boy next door Adie, "overstaying" Tonton, the geeky Gilbert, the martial arts buff Toffee, and rich guy Arnel – as they try to pass senior year in a different high school (they were kicked out from their previous school). Along the way, they encounter some of the typical adventures and misadventures common to adolescents - young love, family problems, and sexual hijinks.

However, all does not go well, as their separate backgrounds generate problems of their own. Arnel is the only son whose parents want to take over the family business and his mother disapproves of his choice of girlfriend, Janice, who comes from a middle-class background. Toffee seeks companionship in Christine, an older flight attendant, because his own mother, an actress, does not attend to his needs. Gilbert lives in a rented apartment where his mother is hard at work as a businesswoman and the father, a policeman, often hangs out at the sauna baths when the rent is already months overdue. His situation is also the same as that of Tonton, who has stayed in senior year for four years. Adie's in love with Ivy, a girl next door who's actually married.

Reality hits the gang the hardest when Tonton loses his girlfriend, Rose, in a car accident while drag racing on the same night of the junior-senior prom. As graduation day draws near, it dawns on the gang that they will have to grow up to prepare for life after high school.

== Cast ==
Main cast

- William Martinez as Tonton
- J.C. Bonnin as Toffee
- Herbert Bautista as Gilbert
- Raymond Lauchengco as Arnel
- Aga Muhlach as Adie

Supporting cast

- Jobelle Salvador as Melissa
- Eula Valdez as Janice
- Yayo Aguila as Rose
- Irma Alegre as Fe Alvarez
- Chanda Romero as Christine
- Herminio Bautista as Butch Bautista
- Baby Delgado as Ivy
- Bembol Roco as Buko Vendor
- Romeo Rivera as Arnel's father
- Robert Campos as Ivy's husband
- Rodolfo 'Boy' Garcia as Tonton's father
- Lita Gutierez as Tonton's mother
- Celia Rodriguez as Adie's mother
- Luz Valdez as Gilbert's mother
- Rosemarie Gil as Arnel's mother
- Liza Lorena as Toffee's mother

== Production ==
The idea of Bagets was conceptualized by Douglas Quijano, the project coordinator and talent manager for Regal Films. With William Lorenzo, a young actor whom Quijano served as his manager, on-board on helping his project, they pitched the concept to Lily Monteverde, the foundress-producer of the said studio, who later approved of the idea. However, with Monteverde's casting choices which led to their dissatisfaction, they went to pitch the concept again to Vic R. Del Rosario Jr., who founded and served as producer for the then-fledgling Viva Films. Del Rosario believed that Quijano and Lorenzo's concept was a good idea to launch his newly-signed stars Herbert Bautista, Aga Muhlach, Raymond Lauchengco, and JC Bonnin.

== Bagets 2 ==
Bagets 2
- Directed by: Maryo J. de los Reyes
- Written by: Jake Tordesillas
- Produced by: Vic del Rosario Jr.
- Starring: William Martinez; J.C. Bonnin; Herbert Bautista; Raymond Lauchengco; Francis Magalona; Jon Hernandez
- Cinematography: Joe Batac Jr.
- Edited by: Ike Jarlego Jr.
- Music by: Spanky Rigor
- Production company: Viva Films
- Distributed by: Viva Films (Theatrical)
- Release date: November 15, 1984
- Running time: 130 minutes
- Country: Philippines
- Language: Filipino

=== Plot ===
Produced in the same year as Bagets, Bagets 2 is set in the immediate summer after the events of the first movie, and deals with more of the guys' misadventures as they prepare for college. The film most deals with their participation in an arts workshop and inter-personal relationships with three new characters - Wally, Gilbert's cousin and a young man forced by his mother to become a priest; Mikee, a TV director's son looking for his big break, and Ponce, an auto expert-cum inside-dancer. Also included in the mix is Ruth, Tonton & Toffee's balikbayan cousin.

=== Cast of Bagets 2 ===
Most of the cast from the original movie returned, including the actors who played the lead characters' parents. However, Aga Muhlach (Adie) and Jobelle Salvador (Melissa) did not reprise their roles. According to the Bagets DVD feature "Flashback: The BAGETS Reunion," Muhlach's career was already taking off at the time. Salvador's absence has not been explained. As a result, their circumstances were written in the story - Adie flew off to the United States at the start of the movie, while Melissa went to Davao to join her father.

- William Martinez as Tonton
- J.C. Bonnin as Toffee
- Herbert Bautista as Gilbert
- Raymond Lauchengco as Arnel
- Ramon Christopher as Mikee
- Cheska Iñigo as Ruth
- Eula Valdez as Janice
- Francis Magalona as Ponce aka Pawnshop
- Jon Hernandez as Wally
- Monette Rivera as Noreen Burgos
- Claudette Khan as Emerie Tuazon
- Grace Gonzales as Sarah Jane
- Mariglen Ordonez as Glenda
- Joy Maniego as Nicolette
- Cherie Gil as Marinel
- Rina Reyes

== Bagets: The Reunion ==
In 2007, Bagets director Maryo J. de los Reyes revealed that Viva Films will be doing a Bagets reunion movie. The original cast of both Bagets films was supposed to star in this installment. The movie had a 2008 production start date.

However, Raymond Lauchengco, one of the original five lead actors, said the film will not be done at all because some members of the cast no longer had the appetite to see it through.

== Remake ==
Bagets: Just Got Lucky is an afternoon youth-oriented television show in the Philippines that is produced by Viva Television and developed by TV5. It is a remake of the 1984 films Bagets and Bagets 2.

== Bagets: The Musical ==
In 2026, the movie was adapted into stage play called, Bagets The Musical directed by Vincent Lim which stars Andres Muhlach, KD Estrada, Tomas Rodriguez, Jeff Moses and Milo Cruz. The theatrical production ran from January to March 2026 held at Newport Performing Arts Theater.
