= William Martinez (actor) =

Filipino actor (born 1966)

- Born: William Pineda Martinez; May 31, 1966 (age 60); Manila, Philippines
- Other names: Kulit, Pabling, Papa Yam
- Occupations: Television and film actor
- Years active: 1980–present
- Spouse: Yayo Aguila (m. 1985; sep. 2010)
- Relatives: Albert Martinez (brother)

William Pineda Martinez (born May 31, 1966) is a Filipino actor who belongs to the first batch of Regal babies whose movie career was launched in the early 1980s. He initially starred in drama films, Manila by Night (1980), Bilibid Boys (1981), Tambay sa Disco (1980) until his studio paired him with Maricel Soriano in Oh My Mama (1981) and the result was a box-office success. Their tandem spawned many hits for Regal Films, mostly comedy movies that defined and cemented their Taray and Kulit loveteam. In 1984, William was given a title role in the 10th Metro Manila Film Festival with the thriller, Alapaap as a drug-crazed writer. He got best actor nominations from award-giving bodies the following year. He is also known for his role as Ton-Ton in Bagets & Bagets 2.

== Early life ==
William Pineda Martinez was born in Manila on May 31, 1966, to Bert Martinez, a Filipino Mestizo, and Margarita Pineda. He is of Spanish and Filipino descent. As a young boy, William was known to have memorized commercials on television and had dreams of being an actor someday. William started as a commercial model for "Close-Up" toothpaste in 1979 and was discovered by late Talent Manager Douglas Quijano, after which he became a permanent artist under Regal Films which skyrocketed his career as the "Pambansang Pabling" or the ultimate 80's matinee idol.

== Personal life ==
He was married to Bagets co-star Yayo Aguila from 1985 to 2010. In November 2010, he had a stroke. He is the son of Bert Martinez and Margarita Martinez, the brother of Albert Martinez, Ronnie Martinez, and Bernadette Martinez-Lim.

On June 28, 1987, Martinez was arrested in Antipolo for the illegal possession of cannabis and two traffic violations.

== Filmography ==
=== Film ===
- Manila by Night (1980) – Alex
- Tambay sa Disco (1980)
- Problem Child (1980)
- Summer Love (1981)
- Carnival Queen (1981)
- Pabling (1981) – Berto
- Boystown (1981) – Arnel
- Oh, My Mama (1981)
- Bihagin: Bilibid Boys (1981) – Luga
- Bilibid Gays (1981) – Luga
- Hindi Kita Malimot (1982) – Edwin
- Galawgaw (1982) – Truman
- Summer Holiday (1982)
- Ito Ba ang Ating Mga Anak (1982)
- No Other Love (1982)
- Story of Three Loves (1982) – Brando
- Mother Dear (1982) – Ake
- Forgive and Forget (1982) – Dennis
- I Love You, I Hate You (1983) – Bitoy
- Santa Claus Is Coming to Town! (1982)
- D'Godson (1983)
- Parang Kailan Lang (1983)
- To Mama with Love (1983) – Dodjie/Menandro
- Minsan, May Isang Ina (1983)
- Friends in Love (1983)
- D' Godson (1983)
- Bagets (1984) – Tonton
- Daddy's Little Darlings (1984)
- Kaya Kong Abutin ang Langit (1984) – Daryll Revilla
- Teenage Marriage (1984)
- Anak ni Waray vs. Anak ni Biday (1984) – Joey
- Bagets 2 (1984) – Tonton
- Shake, Rattle & Roll (1984) – Dodong
- Alapaap (1984)
- Mga Kuwento ni Lola Basyang (1985) – Mike
- Gamitin Mo Ako (1985) – Mike
- Inday Bote (1985) – Greggy
- Bomba Arienda (1985)
- Hindi Mo Ako Kayang Tapakan (1986)
- Inday-Inday sa Balitaw (1986) – Cleto
- The Graduates (1986)
- When I Fall in Love (1986)
- Payaso (1986)
- Bunsong Kerubin (1987) – Larry
- Jack en Poy, Hale-hale Hoy (1987)
- Maria Went to Town! (1987) – Barok
- Stupid Cupid (1988) – Jorge
- Lesson in Love (1990)
- Dino... Abangan ang Susunod Na... (1993)
- Guwapings Dos (1993) – Simon
- Sana'y Laging Magkapiling (1994)
- Mayor Cesar Climaco (1994)
- Sana Maulit Muli (1995) – Nick
- Si Mario at si Goko (1995)
- Mara Clara: The Movie (1996) – Gary Davis
- Mano Mano (1996)
- Mortal Kombat (1997)
- Magic Kingdom: Ang Alamat ng Damortis (1997)
- Kailan Mmatigil ang Putukan (1997)
- Askal (1997)
- Kung Ayaw Mo, Huwag Mo! (1998) – Mike
- Ekis: Walang Takas (1999)
- Sindak (1999)
- Most Wanted (2000)
- Cool Dudes 24/7 (2001)
- Pangarap Ko ang Iibigin Ka (2003)
- Umaaraw, Umuulan (2006) – William, Movie Executive
- Twilight Dancers (2006)
- Manila (2009)
- Barako (2011)
- Pintakasi (2011)
- El Presidente (2012)
- On the Job (2013)
- Overtime (2014)
- Honor Thy Father (2015)
- Magtanggol (2016)
- Imagine You and Me (2016)
- An Educator (2017)
- Petmalu (2018)
- Ulan (2019)
- Mia (2019)
- On the Job: The Missing 8 (Reality Entertainment, 2021)
- Sa Kamay ng Diyos (JPM Film Production, 2023)

=== Television ===
- Lovingly Yours, Helen
- Clubhouse 9
- Young Love, Sweet Love
- Ang Tabi Kong Mamaw
- Dr. Potpot & the Satellite Kid
- Mga Kuwento ni Lola Basyang
- GMA Telecine Specials
- GMA True Stories
- Boracay
- Ready Na Direk
- Doon Po sa Amin
- Spotlight
- Mikee
- GMA Love Stories
- Maalaala Mo Kaya
- Love Notes (1993–1998)
- Noli Me Tángere (1993)
- Tondominium (1994–1995)
- Mara Clara (1996–1997) - replaced Eruel Tongco who died in 1996
- 1896 (1996)
- Haybol Rambol
- G-mik
- Maynila
- Ang Mahiwagang Baul
- Love to Love
- I Luv NY
- Magpakailanman
- Moomoo & Me (2009–2010)
- Daisy Siete
- Komiks Presents: Kapitan Boom
- It's Showtime - guest celebrity jurado
- 5 Star Specials (2010)
- Untold Stories
- Sineserye Presents: Florinda
- Extra Challenge
- Protégé - guest judge
- Artista Academy - guest judge
- Cassandra: Warrior Angel
- Wansapanataym
- Tunay na Buhay
- Basta Driver, Sweet Lover
- ASOP: A Song Of Praise Season 2
- Madam Chairman
- Klasrum
- Jasmine
- Sabado Badoo
- Boys Ride Out
- Wattpad Presents
- Laff Camera Action
- Dear Uge
- FPJ's Ang Probinsyano
- Sherlock Jr.
- Tadhana
- FPJ’s Batang Quiapo
