= J.C. Bonnin =

Filipino actor

JC Bonnin
- Born: Juan Carlos Shinzato Bonnin; February 2, 1968 (age 58); Okinawa, Japan
- Occupations: Actor, pastor
- Years active: 1982–1987
- Known for: Bagets
- Spouses: Rachel Bonnin; Jill Bonnin
- Children: 9

Juan Carlos "JC" Shinzato Bonnin (born February 2, 1968) is a retired Filipino actor. He was a matinee idol in the 1980s, best remembered for his role in the 1984 film Bagets and its sequel Bagets 2.

== Career ==
Bonnin comes from a family of well-known entertainment personalities. His uncle Bernard Bonnin was a former actor. His cousins are former beauty queen/actress Charlene González (now married to actor Aga Muhlach) and former actor Richard Bonnin.

He began his acting career in 1981, where he bagged the role of Monty in Flordeluna. The following year, he bagged his first leading role with Sharon Cuneta in Cross My Heart. He got his biggest break when he became part of Bagets. He later on starred in various movies with Viva, including Ninja Kids and Kamagong.

He retired from showbiz in 1987 and attended bible school. In 1998, he moved to the United Kingdom where he became a pastor. In 2011, he moved to the United States, where he works as a hospice chaplain and spiritual counselor.

== Politics ==
In early 1986, Bonnin was noted to be attending KBL campaign sorties for the reelection of president Ferdinand Marcos in the 1986 snap election.

== Filmography ==
=== Film ===
- Manedyer... Si Kumander (1982)
- Zimatar (1982)
- Cross My Heart (1982)
- Daddy Knows Best (1983)
- Bagets (1984)
- 14 Going Steady (1984)
- Bagets 2 (1984)
- Ma'am May We Go Out? (1985)
- Haunted House! (1985)
- Ninja Kids (1986)
- Kamagong (1987)

=== Television ===
- Flordeluna (1981)
- That's Entertainment (1986)
- Julian Talisman (1988)
