= Vic del Rosario =

Filipino businessman

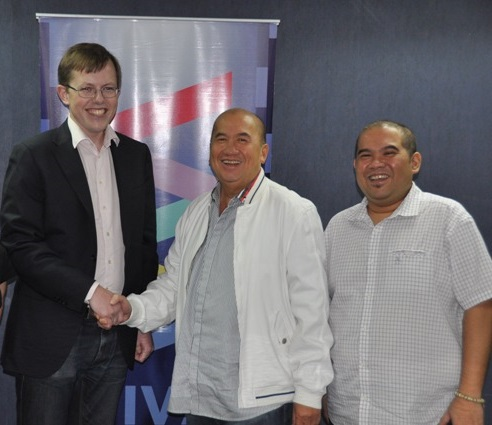
- Born: Vicente del Rosario, Jr. October 26, 1945 (age 80); Commonwealth of the Philippines
- Occupations: Businessman; media executive
- Years active: 1966–present
- Board member of: Viva Communications
- Spouse: Mina Aragon (died 1996)
- Children: 3, including Vincent and Veronique
- Relatives: Orly Ilacad (cousin)

Vicente del Rosario Jr. (born October 26, 1945) is a Filipino businessman who co-founded the music publishing company Vicor Music in 1966 and the entertainment company Viva Communications in 1981.

== Career ==
=== Vicor Music ===
Del Rosario co-founded Vicor Music Corporation with his cousin Orlando "Orly" Ilacad along Raon Street (now Gonzalo Puyat Street) in Quiapo, Manila in 1966, which was later incorporated in 1969; the company president and general manager were del Rosario and Ilacad respectively. The initial singles released by the company were of singers Jeanne Young and Helen Gamboa, with del Rosario and Ilacad visiting music stores along Raon street to ask if their singles could be sold by their establishments.

As the company developed, the cousins recruited Tony Ocampo to help manage the company while Del Rosario handled music deals and Ilacad acted as producer for the records Vicor released. The company oversaw the release of the first mini-LP in the Philippines in 1970, Tirso Cruz III's album Maria Leonor Theresa, which culled songs from Cruz's previous album PIP. Del Rosario also signed folk singer Freddie Aguilar with the company in the 1970s. By the later part of the decade, Ilacad left Vicor to form a new company called Canary Records (later renamed OctoArts International), with Del Rosario also leaving the company soon after to pursue film production; Ocampo eventually formed Ivory Records in 1983 which later bought Vicor Music Corporation.

=== Viva Communications ===
In March 1980, del Rosario's three-year-old daughter with actress Mina Aragon, Vina Vanessa, perished in a fire set by Rodolfo Quizon Jr. to their home in San Juan, Metro Manila.

In November 1981, del Rosario established the media conglomerate Viva Communications with his sister Teresita "Tess" Cruz; he named it after his late daughter Vina Vanessa. Thru its subsidiary Viva Films, the company released its first film P.S. I Love You in the same month, which became a box office success. By the 1990s, Viva Films had the highest annual film output among all the film studios in the country.

Del Rosario's methods in developing Viva's roster of talents have sometimes been to gear its artists toward having a raunchier image. In the early 2000s, del Rosario continuously asked actress Andrea Del Rosario in their meetings if he can remake her image into a "sexy" celebrity, with Andrea relenting in 2003 by accepting the lead role in the erotic drama film Lupe: A Seaman's Wife. Actress Maui Taylor, who previously starred in the television series Anna Karenina and T.G.I.S., accepted a suggestive role offered by del Rosario in the 2002 film Gamitan. In 2003, del Rosario launched the girl group Viva Hot Babes, which included Taylor in the original line-up. The group recorded pop songs that were noted to frequently feature sexual undertones. In 2009, del Rosario had plans to cast Cristine Reyes in a raunchy horror film, but intended to stop short of making the film sexually explicit in order for theaters to allow its exhibition.

In January 2021, del Rosario directly developed and oversaw the launching of Viva's streaming platform Vivamax. Since its launch, a large portion of the platform's original content were sexploitation films and series; though Vic's son and Viva President Vincent del Rosario denied the view of Vivamax as mostly offering "sexy" films, he stated that "Our adult content is the differentiator."

In mid-2022, del Rosario greenlit the period film Maid in Malacañang under the banner of Viva Films after holding discussions with Senator Imee Marcos, whom he previously worked with in establishing the Metro Manila Popular Music Festival in 1978 and the Cecil Awards in 1982, stating that "I think it would be great to put on film what [the Marcos family] experienced during [their] last three days in Malacañang." The film was intentionally marketed by the company as "the most controversial film of the year".
