= Raymond Lauchengco =

Filipino actor and singer

- Born: November 29, 1965 (age 60); Manila, Philippines
- Occupations: Singer, actor
- Years active: 1976–present
- Spouse: Mia F. Rocha (m. 2005)
- Relatives: Menchu Lauchengco-Yulo (sister)

Raymond Lauchengco (born November 29, 1965) is a Filipino actor, artist, and singer with roots in musical theater. His foray into showbusiness began at the age of 12 when he played the role of Louis, son of Anna, in the Repertory Philippines staging of The King and I.

== Career ==
Lauchengco went on to join mainstream Philippine showbusiness at the age of 18, cementing his reputation as one of the hottest teen idols of the 1980s when he appeared as one of five young male leads in the hugely popular film, Bagets.

Lauchengco was the Philippine representative to the prestigious Tokyo Music Festival in 1987 and has performed in both solo and group concerts in over 25 countries. He is the recipient of the Aliw Award for Best Concert Collaboration for the concert series, The Best of Us, with Ayen Laurel. Raymond has released seven albums, to both critical and commercial success.

On June 23, 1993, he launched the album "New Every Morning" at the Cosmo Bar, and his first album under Dyna Records.

His eighth album, The Promise, released by Viva Records, was released on May 17, 2014.

== Filmography ==
=== Television ===
- That's Entertainment
- Penthouse on 7
- Champoy
- Germspesyal
- GMA Supershow
- Saturday Entertainment
- RSVP
- Dance Upon a Time
- Penthouse on RJTV
- ASAP Natin 'To
- StarStruck
- Wowowee
- Pinoy Big Brother
- Happy Yipee Yehey!
- It's Showtime
- MYX Live
- Mellow MYX
- Celebrity Duets: Philippine Edition
- Eat Bulaga!
- Maalaala Mo Kaya
- Sing Galing
- Magpakailanman
- Maynila
- Bagets: Just Got Lucky
- Just Duet
- The Ryzza Mae Show
- Tonight with Arnold Clavio
- Magandang Buhay
- Tadhana
- Dear Uge

=== Film ===
- Cross My Heart (1982) – Ryan
- Saan Darating ang Umaga? (1983) – Raul
- Bagets (1984) – Arnel
- Bukas Luluhod ang mga Tala (1984) – Jun
- Hotshots (1984) – Danny
- Bagets 2 (1984) – Arnel
- Remember Me, Mama (1987)
- Tiny Terrestrial: The Three Professors (1990) – Prof. Paul Cruz
- Joey Boy Munti, 15 anyos ka sa Muntinlupa (1991)
- Ten Little Indians: Part 2 (1996) – Tonton
- In Your Eyes (2010) – Ciara and Julia's father
- Of All the Things (2012) – Dan
- Felix Manalo Story (Viva Films, 2015) - Dominador
- First Love (Star Cinema, ABS-CBN Films & Viva Films, 2018) – Dave

== Discography ==
- Raymond (1983)
- Dreamboy (1984)
- Rated R (1988)
- Walang Kupas (1992)
- New Every Morning (1993)
- Bagong Bayani Alay Kay Flor (1995)
- SCE: Raymond Lauchengco (1998)
- Raymond Lauchengco (2005)
- Full Circle (2007)
- The Promise (2014)

=== Singles ===
- Farewell
- Saan Darating Ang Umaga?
- I Need You Back

== Concert events ==
- Phil. Star article: Raymond & Menchu Lauchengco – Sibling Revelry show (Feb 2010) "Sweeney Todd meets Tony Bennett on Valentine's by Bibsy Carballo". The Philippine STAR.

== Awards and nominations ==
Year	Award giving body	Category	Nominated work	Results
2006	MYX Music Awards	Favorite MYX Live Performance	—N/a	Nominated
