= List of Philippine films of 2020 =

This is an incomplete list of Filipino full-length films, both mainstream and independently produced, released in theaters and cinemas in 2020. Some films are in production but do not have definite release dates.

== Top grossing films ==
The films released in 2020 by domestic gross are as follows:

– an entry film for Pista ng Pelikulang Pilipino
– an entry film for Metro Manila Film Festival

Rank	Title	Distributor	Box office
1	On Vodka, Beers, and Regrets	Viva Films	₱80 million
2	Block Z	Star Cinema	₱36 million

== Films ==
=== January–March ===
Opening		Title	Production company	Cast and crew	Ref.
J A N U A R Y	15	Mia	Insight 360, Viva Films	Veronica Velasco (director); Coleen Garcia, Edgar Allan Guzman	
J A N U A R Y	22	Nightshift	Viva Films, Aliud Entertainment	Yam Laranas (director); Yam Concepcion	
J A N U A R Y	22	D' Ninang	Regal Entertainment	GB Sampedro (director); Kisses Delavin, McCoy de Leon, Mariel de Leon, Ai-Ai delas Alas	
J A N U A R Y	25	A Thousand Cuts	CineDiaz, Concordia Studio	Ramona S. Diaz (director)	
J A N U A R Y	29	Block Z	Star Cinema, Keep Filming	Mikhail Red (director); Mixkaella Villalon (screenplay); Joshua Garcia, Julia Barretto, Ina Raymundo, Dimples Romana, Ian Veneracion	
F E B R U A R Y	5	On Vodka, Beers, and Regrets	Viva Films	Irene Emma Villamor (director/screenplay); JC Santos, Bela Padilla	
F E B R U A R Y	12	James & Pat & Dave	Star Cinema	Theodore Boborol (director); Daisy G. Cayanan, Marionne Dominique Mancol (screenplay); Ronnie Alonte, Loisa Andalio, Donny Pangilinan, Awra Briguela	
F E B R U A R Y	14	Ang Lakaran ni Kabunyan: Kabunyan's Journey to Liwanag	The Unconfined Cinema: An Expanded Cinema Project	Kidlat Tahimik (director); Kabunyan Cedric Enrique de Guia	
F E B R U A R Y	19	Untrue	Viva Films, The IdeaFirst Company	Sigrid Andrea Bernardo (director/screenplay); Cristine Reyes, Xian Lim, Rhen Escaño	
F E B R U A R Y	19	Watch List	Bron Studios, Reality Entertainment	Ben Rekhi (director); Alessandra De Rossi	
F E B R U A R Y	19	Sunday Night Fever	iWant originals	Lemuel Lorca (director); Diether Ocampo, Nathalie Hart, Ricky Davao	
F E B R U A R Y	22	Death of Nintendo	Black Sheep, IndieFlip	Raya Martin (director); Noel Comia Jr., Agot Isidro	
F E B R U A R Y	26	Us Again	Regal Entertainment	Joy Aquino (director); Jane Oineza, RK Bagatsing	
M A R C H	4	Hindi Tayo Pwede	Viva Films	Joel Lamangan (director); Ricky Lee (screenplay); Lovi Poe, Marco Gumabao, Tony Labrusca	

=== April–June ===
Opening		Title	Production company	Cast and crew	Ref.
M A Y	8	The Next 12 Days	Blade Entertainment, Witty Jack Media	CJ Santos (director); Mary Joy Apostol, Akihiro Blanco	
M A Y	15	Love Lockdown	iWant originals	Andoy Ranay, Darnel Villaflor, Noel Escondo, and Manny Palo (directors); Angelica Panganiban, Jake Cuenca, JM de Guzman, Arjo Atayde, Sue Ramirez, Tony Labrusca, Kylie Verzosa	
M A Y	28	Malaya	iWant originals	Concepcion Makatuno (director); Lovi Poe, Zanjoe Marudo	

=== July–September ===
Opening		Title	Production company	Cast and crew	Ref.
J U L Y	28	Elehiya sa Paglimot	Brigade Productions	Kristoffer Brugada (director)	
A U G U S T	20	Love the Way U Lie	Netflix	RC Delos Reyes (director); Xian Lim, Alex Gonzaga, Kylie Verzosa	

Color key

– a Pista ng Pelikulang Pilipino entry film
– a Cinemalaya Philippine Independent Film Festival entry film
– a ToFarm (The Outstanding Farmers in the Philippines) Film Festival entry film

=== October–December ===
Opening		Title	Production company	Cast and crew	Ref.
O C T O B E R	23	I, Will: The Doc Willie Ong Story	ALW Film Production, Rocketts Productions	Ronn Rick (director); Rod Cabataña Marmol (screenplay); Hero Angeles, Raechelle Ricketts, Jackielou Blanco, Efren Reyes	
O C T O B E R	29	Hayop Ka!	Netflix	Avid Liongoren (director); Manny Angeles, Paulle Olivenza (screenplay); Angelica Panganiban, Robin Padilla, Sam Milby	
O C T O B E R	30	U-Turn	Star Cinema	Roderick Cabrido (director); Kim Chiu, JM De Guzman, Tony Labrusca	
O C T O B E R	31	Sitsit	iWantTFC	Ato Bautista and Erin Pascual (directors); Ivana Alawi, Jake Cuenca	
N O V E M B E R	11	Good Times Bad	Ala Una Films, Blade Asia	Ara Baldonado (director); Hasna Usman, Jal Galang	
N O V E M B E R	13	My Lockdown Romance	Star Cinema	Bobby Bonifacio Jr. (director); Jameson Blake, Joao Constancia	
N O V E M B E R	15	Alter Me	Netflix	RC delos Reyes (director); Enchong Dee, Jasmine Curtis-Smith	
N O V E M B E R	20	He Who Is Without Sin	Centerstage Productions, Sinag Maynila, Solar Pictures	Jason Paul Laxamana (director); Elijah Canlas, Enzo Pineda	
N O V E M B E R	20	Kintsugi	Pelikulaw, Solar Pictures	Lawrence Fajardo (director); JC Santos, Hiro Nishiuchi	
N O V E M B E R	20	The Highest Peak	Centerstage Productions, Red Motion Media, Sinag Maynila, Solar Pictures	Arnel Barbarona (director); Dax Alejandro, Mara Lopez, Henyo Ehem, Roweno Caballes, Jea Lyka Cinco	
N O V E M B E R	27	Midnight in a Perfect World	Globe Studios, Epicmedia	Dodo Dayao (director); Jasmine Curtis-Smith, Glaiza de Castro	
N O V E M B E R	27	Boyette: Not a Girl, Yet	Star Cinema	Jumbo Albany (director); Zaijan Jaranilla, Maris Racal, Iñigo Pascual	
N O V E M B E R	30	Finding Agnes	Netflix	Marla Ancheta (director); Sue Ramirez, Jelson Bay	
D E C E M B E R	5	Memoirs of a Teenage Rebel	RCP Production	Robin Padilla (director)	
D E C E M B E R	11	Four Sisters Before the Wedding	Star Cinema	Mae Cruz-Alviar (director); Vanessa R. Valdez (screenplay); Alexa Ilacad, Charlie Dizon, Gillian Vicencio, Belle Mariano	
D E C E M B E R	25	Coming Home	Maverick Films, ALV Films	Adolf Alix Jr. (director); Gina Marissa Tagasa (screenplay); Jinggoy Estrada, Sylvia Sanchez, Edgar Allan Guzman	
D E C E M B E R	25	Fan Girl	Black Sheep Productions, Globe Studios, Project 8 Corner San Joaquin Projects, Epic Media, Crossword Productions	Antoinette Jadaone (director/screenplay); Paulo Avelino, Charlie Dizon	
D E C E M B E R	25	Isa Pang Bahaghari	Heaven's Best Entertainment	Joel Lamangan (director); Nora Aunor, Phillip Salvador, Michael de Mesa	
D E C E M B E R	25	Magikland	Brightlight Leisure Productions, Gallaga Reyes Films	Christian Acuna (director); Miggs Cuaderno, Elijah Alejo	
D E C E M B E R	25	Mang Kepweng: Ang Lihim ng Bandanang Itim	Cineko Productions	Topel Lee (director); Vhong Navarro, Barbie Imperial	
D E C E M B E R	25	Pakboys Takusa	Viva Films	Al Tantay (director/screenplay); Rolf Mahilom, Dan Salamante (screenplay); Janno Gibbs, Dennis Padilla, Jerald Napoles, Andrew E.	
D E C E M B E R	25	Suarez: The Healing Priest	Saranggola Media Productions, Viva Films	Joven Tan (director); John Arcilla, Alice Dixson	
D E C E M B E R	25	Tagpuan	Alternative Vision Cinema	McArthur C. Alejandre (director); Ricardo Lee (screenplay) Alfred Vargas, Iza Calzado, Shaina Magdayao	
D E C E M B E R	25	The Boy Foretold by the Stars	Clever Minds Inc.	Dolly Dulu (director); Adrian Lindayag, Keann Johnson	
D E C E M B E R	25	The Missing	Regal Entertainment	Easy Ferrer (director/screenplay); Joseph Marco, Miles Ocampo, Ritz Azul	

Color key

– a Sinag Maynila Film Festival entry film
– a Cinema One Originals Film Festival entry film
– a QCinema International Film Festival entry film
– a Metro Manila Film Festival entry film

== Awards ==
=== Local ===
The following list shows the Best Picture winners at the four major film awards: FAMAS Awards, Gawad Urian Awards, Luna Awards and Star Awards; at other prominent film awards and at the three major film festivals: Metro Manila Film Festival, Cinemalaya and QCinema.

Award/Festival	Best Picture		Ref.
69th FAMAS Awards	Magikland		
44th Gawad Urian Awards	Aswang		
39th Luna Awards	not held		
37th Star Awards for Movies	Untrue	Tagpuan	
31st Young Critics Circle Citations	Death of Nintendo, Kintsugi (tie)		
23rd Gawad Pasado	Isa Pang Bahaghari, Tagpuan (tie)		
19th Gawad Tanglaw	Watch List		
4th Eddys Awards	Fan Girl		
1st Pinoy Rebyu Awards	Aswang		
46th Metro Manila Film Festival	Fan Girl		
16th Cinemalaya Independent Film Festival	Tokwifi (short film)		
8th QCinema International Film Festival	6 short films as co-winners		
4th Pista ng Pelikulang Pilipino	Cleaners		
16th Cinema One Originals Film Festival	not held		
9th CineFilipino Film Festival	not held		
6th Sinag Maynila Film Festival	not held		
5th ToFarm Film Festival	not held		

=== International ===
The following list shows Filipino films (released in 2019) which were nominated or won awards at international industry-based awards and FIAPF-accredited competitive film festivals.

Award/Festival	Category	Honoree	Result	Ref.
59th Asia Pacific Film Festival	Best Editing	Benjamin Tolentino, Kalel, 15	Won	
Fantasporto - 40th Oporto International Film Festival	Best Actress	Cristine Reyes, Untrue	Won	
70th Berlin International Film Festival	Silver Bear Jury Prize, Berlinale Shorts	Rafael Manuel, Filipiñana	Won	
77th Venice International Film Festival	Best Director, Orizzonti Section	Lav Diaz, Lahi, Hayop	Won	
