= 37th PMPC Star Awards for Movies =

2023 Philippine Movie Press Club awards

37th Star Awards for Movies
- Date: February 12, 2023
- Site: Virtual award ceremony
- Hosted by: Paolo Bediones; Lara Morena

Highlights
- Best Picture: Untrue; Tagpuan (Indie)

The 37th PMPC Star Awards for Movies by the Philippine Movie Press Club (PMPC), honored the best Filipino films of 2020. The ceremony took place on February 12, 2023 via virtual award ceremony. The ceremony was headed by PMPC President Fernan de Guzman, accompanied by former PMPC President and Chairman Ronald Castro.

The PMPC Star Awards for Movies was hosted by Paolo Bediones and Lara Morena. Untrue won the Movie of the Year and Movie Director of the Year, while Tagpuan won for Indie Movie of the Year, Indie Movie Ensemble Cast of the Year and Indie Movie Director of the Year.

== Winners and nominees ==
The following are the nominations for the 37th PMPC Star Awards for Movies, covering films released in 2020.

Winners are listed first and indicated in bold.

=== Major categories ===
Movie of the Year	Indie Movie of the Year
Winner: **"Untrue"** (Viva Films, IdeaFirst Company, October Train Films): "Fan Girl" (Black Sheep, Globe Studios, Epicmedia Productions, Project 8 Projects, Crossword Productions); "Four Sisters Before The Wedding" (Star Cinema); "Isa Pang Bahaghari" (Heaven's Best Entertainment); "Love Lockdown" (Dreamscape Entertainment and iWantTFC); "Nightshift" (Viva Films, Aliud Entertainment, ImaginePerSecond); "On Vodka, Beers, and Regrets" (Viva Films); "Us Again" (Regal Entertainment)	Winner: **"Tagpuan"** (Alternative Vision Cinema): "Coming Home" (ALV Films and Maverick Films); "He Who Is Without Sin" (Sinag Maynila and Solar Pictures); "Lahi, Hayop" (Sine Olivia Pilipinas); "Magikland" (Brightlight Productions and Gallaga-Reyes Films); "Suarez: The Healing Priest" (Saranggola Media Productions); "The Boy Foretold By The Stars" (Clever Minds, Brainstormers Lab, The Dolly Collection, Purple Pig); "Watch List" (BRON Studios, State of Awe, Reality Entertainment)
Movie Ensemble Acting of the Year	Indie Movie Ensemble Acting of the Year
Winner: **The cast of "Isa Pang Bahaghari"**: The cast of "Fan Girl"; The cast of "Four Sisters Before The Wedding"; The cast of "Love Lockdown"; The cast of "Nightshift"; The cast of "On Vodka, Beers, and Regrets"; The cast of "Untrue"	Winner: **The cast of "Tagpuan"**: The cast of "Coming Home"; The cast of "Death Of Nintendo"; The cast of "Lahi, Hayop "; The cast of "Suarez, The Healing Priest"; The cast of "The Boy Foretold By The Stars"; The cast of "Watch List"
Movie Director of the Year	Indie Movie Director of the Year
Winner: **Sigrid Andrea Bernardo** - **(Untrue)**: Mae Cruz Alviar - (Four Sisters Before The Wedding); Joy Aquino - (Us Again); Noel Escondo, Manny Palo, Andoy Ranay and Darnel Joy Villafor - (Love Lockdown); Antoinette Jadaone - (Fan Girl); Joel Lamangan - (Isa Pang Bahaghari); Yam Laranas - (Nightshift); Irene Emma Villamor - (On Vodka, Beers, and Regrets)	Winner: **"Tagpuan"** (Alternative Vision Cinema): "Coming Home" (ALV Films and Maverick Films); "He Who Is Without Sin" (Sinag Maynila and Solar Pictures); "Lahi, Hayop" (Sine Olivia Pilipinas); "Magikland" (Brightlight Productions and Gallaga-Reyes Films); "Suarez, The Healing Priest" (Saranggola Media Productions); "The Boy Foretold By The Stars" (Clever Minds, Brainstormers Lab, The Dolly Collection, Purple Pig); "Watch List" (BRON Studios, State of Awe, Reality Entertainment)
Movie Actor of the Year	Movie Actress of the Year
Winner: **John Arcilla** - **(Suarez, The Healing Priest)**: Paulo Avelino - (Fan Girl); Enchong Dee - (Alter Me); Nanding Josef - (Lahi, Hayop); Xian Lim - (Untrue); Phillip Salvador - (Isa Pang Bahaghari); Alfred Vargas - (Tagpuan)	Winner: Tied between **Alessandra De Rossi** - **(Watch List)** and **Sylvia Sanchez** - **(Coming Home)**: Nora Aunor - (Isa Pang Bahaghari); Iza Calzado - (Tagpuan); Charlie Dizon - (Fan Girl); Lovi Poe - (Malaya); Cristine Reyes - (Untrue)
Movie Supporting Actor of the Year	Movie Supporting Actress of the Year
Winner: **Edgar Allan Guzman** - **(Coming Home)**: Art Acuña - (Watch List); Michael De Mesa - (Isa Pang Bahaghari); Micko Laurente - (Watch List); Zanjoe Marudo - (Isa Pang Bahaghari); Enzo Pineda - (He Who Is Without Sin); Dante Rivero - (Suarez, The Healing Priest )	Winner: **Shaina Magdayao** - (Tagpuan): Kakai Bautista - (Four Sisters Before The Wedding); Angeli Bayani - (Watch List); Agot Isidro - (Death Of Nintendo); Sanya Lopez - (Isa Pang Bahaghari); Hazel Orencio - (Lahi, Hayop); Sue Ramirez - (Love Lockdown)
New Movie Actor of the Year	New Movie Actress of the Year
Winner:**Jake Ejercito** - (Coming Home): Joao Constance - (My Lockdown Romance); Joshua Eugenio - (Magikland); Jeremiah Lisbo - (Four Sisters Before The Wedding); Charles Nathan - (Beki Problems); CJ Salonga - (James And Pat And Dave); Jigger Sementilla - (Death of Nintendo)	Winner: **Charlie Dizon** - (Fan Girl): Ivana Alawi - (Sitsit: Aswang episode); Princess Aguilar - (Magikland); Ariella Arida - (Coming Home); Sarah Edwards (Us Again); Angel Guardian - (D' Ninang); Kim Chloe Oquendo - (Death of Nintendo)
Movie Child Performer of the Year
Winner: **Yñigo Delen** (Suarez, The Healing Priest): Xenia Barrameda - (Mia); Miguel Gabriel Diokno - (Tagpuan); Miel Espinosa - (Block Z)

=== Technical categories ===
Movie Original Screenplay of the Year	Indie Movie Original Screenplay of the Year
Winner: **Enrique Ramos** - (Isa Pang Bahaghari): Sigrid Andrea Bernardo - (Untrue); Juvy Galamiton - (Us Again); Antoinette Jadaone - (Fan Girl); Joel Mercado - (Love Lockdown); Vanessa Valdez - (Four Sisters Before The Wedding); Irene Emma Villamor - (On Vodka, Beers, and Regrets)	Winner: **Ricardo Lee** - **(Tagpuan)**: Lav Diaz - (Lahi, Hayop); Dolly Dulu - (The Boy Foretold By The Stars); Bernard Factor Canaberal, Ferdie Aboga Jr., and Joven Tan - (Suarez, The Healing Priest); Jason Paul Laxamana - (He Who Is Without Sin); Ben Rekhi and Rona Lean Sales - (Watch List); Gina Marissa Tagasa - (Coming Home)
Movie Cinematographer of the Year	Indie Movie Cinematographer of the Year
Winner: **Boy Yñiguez** - (Untrue): Neil Daza - (Fan Girl); Neil Daza - (Four Sisters Before The Wedding); Noel Escondo, Manny Palo, Andoy Ranay, Darnel Joy Villafor - (Love Lockdown); Yam Laranas - (Nightshift); TM Malones - (Isa Pang Bahaghari); Marvin Reyes - (The Missing)	Winner: **Lav Diaz** - (Lahi, Hayop): Tejay Gonzales - (Suarez, The Healing Priest); Rody Lacap - (Magikland); Carlo Mendoza, Treb Monteras II, and Daniel Uy - (Tagpuan); Daniella Nowitz - (Watch List); Marvin Reyes - (The Boy Foretold By The Stars); Boy Yñiguez - (Kintsugi)
Movie Production Designer of the Year	Indie Movie Production Designer of the Year
Winner: **Maolen Fadul** - **(Untrue)**: Ferdi Abuel - (Fan Girl); Ferdi Abuel - (On Vodka, Beers, and Regrets); Jay Custodio - (Isa Pang Bahaghari); Popo Diaz - (The Missing); Shari Marie Montiague - (Four Sisters Before The Wedding); Ericson Navarro -(Us Again)	Winner: **Whammy Alcazaren and Thesa Tang** - **(Death Of Nintendo)**: Endi Balbuena and Rolando Inocencio (Kintsugi); Popo Diaz - (Lahi, Hayop); Nimrod James Sta. Ana - (Finding Agnes); Lars Magbanua - (The Boy Foretold By The Stars); Ericson Navarro - (Magikland); Ericson Navarro - (Tagpuan)
Movie Editor of the Year	Indie Movie Editor of the Year
Winner: **Mae Carzon** - **(Nightshift)**: Mai Calapardo - (Isa Pang Bahaghari); Chrisel Desuasido - (Us Again); Froilan Francia - (Love Lockdown); Marya Ignacio - (Untrue); Arnex Nicolas - (On Vodka, Beers, and Regrets); Benjamin Tolentino - (Fan Girl)	Winner: **Liza Espinas and Nick Ellsberg** - **(Watch List)**: Adolfo Alix Jr. and Roseanne Gatchero - (Coming Home); Mai Calapardo - (He Who Is Without Sin); Manet Dayrit - (Magikland); Vanessa De Leon - (Finding Agnes) Agnes); Benjo Ferrer and Carlo Francisco Manatad - (Tagpuan); Noah Tonga - (The Boy Foretold By The Stars)
Movie Musical Scorer of the Year	Indie Movie Musical Scorer of the Year
Winner:**Kean Cipriano and Brain Coat** - **(On Vodka, Beers, and Regrets)**: Teresa Barrozo - (Fan Girl); Len Calvo - (Untrue); Cesar Francis Concio - (Four Sisters Before The Wedding); Carmina Cuya -(U Turn); Oscar Fogelström - (Nightshift); Emerzon Texon - (Isa Pang Bahaghari)	Winner: **Emerzon Texon** - **(Magikland)**: Sherwin Castillo - (Suarez, The Healing Priest); Cesar Francis Concio - (Mia); Vincent Chu - (Coming Home); Von De Guzman - (Tagpuan); William Ryan Fritch - (Watch List); Paulo Protacio - (The Boy Foretold By The Stars)
Movie Sound Engineer of the Year	Indie Movie Sound Engineer of the Year
Winner: **Dennis Cham** - **(Untrue)**: Lamberto Casas, Jr. - (Isa Pang Bahaghari); John Daryl Libongco - (On Vodka, Beers, and Regrets); Fatima Nerikka Salim and Immanuel Verona - (Block Z); Fatima Nerikka Salim and Immanuel Verona - (U Turn); Alex Tomboc and Pietro Marco Javier - (Nightshift); Vincent Villa - (Fan Girl)	Winner: **Albert Michael Idioma and Alex Tomboc** - **(Magikland)**: Cecil Buban (Lahi, Hayop); Aian Louie Caro - (He Who Is Without Sin); Lamberto Casas Jr. - (Kintsugi); Albert Michael Idioma and Aian Louie Caro - (Tagpuan); Pietro Marco Javier and Jannina Mikaela Minglanilla - (The Boy Foretold By The Stars); Nathan Ruyle - (Watch List)
Movie Original Theme Song of the Year	Indie Movie Original Theme Song of the Year
Winner: **"Hanggang Sa Muli"** performed by Gerald Santos, composed and arranged by Emerzon Texon ("Isa Pang Bahaghari"): "F*king Circumstance" performed by Pappel, composed and arranged by Kean Cipriano ("On Vodka, Beers, And Regrets"); "Ikaw At Ako (Tinadhana)" performed by KZ Tandingan and TJ Monterde, lyrics by Concepcion Macatuno, music Jonathan Manalo, arranged by Arnold Buena ("Malaya")	Winner: **"Yakapin Mo Ako"** performed by John Arcilla, lyrics and music by Joven Tan, arranged by Sherwin Castillo ("Suarez, The Healing Priest"): "Ganyan Ang Pag-Ibig Ko" performed by Lito Camo, lyrics and music by Lito Camo, arranged by Jun Tamayo ("Coming Home"); "Sa Iba Na Lang" by B.O.U., composed by Jayson Dedal, arranged by Brian Lotho ("Mia"); "Smile" performed by Francis Johann Andra, Eliana Crucillo, Martha Raine Gulapa, Daniel Lardizabal, Emmanuel Lardizabal; composed and arranged by Emerzon Texon ("Magikland"); "Ulan" performed by Bugoy Drilon, composed by Jhaye Cura and Pau Protacio, arranged by Tbear Music ("The Boy Foretold By The Stars")

=== Short Films ===
Short Film Movie of the Year	Short Film Movie Director of the Year
Winner: **"Basurero"** (Lucena Films, Autodidact Films, Globe Studios): "Byaheng Madilim" (Teri Onor Entertainment Services); "Crossing" (Pasa-Hero Productions); "Dalaginding Na Si Isang" (FDCP, QCFDC, and DILG); "Filipiñana" (Idle Eyes, London Film School, Screen Asia, Simple Truth); "Heneral Rizal" (Tanghalang Pilipino and Voyage Studios); "Igib" (The Powerhouse Ensemble); "My Father Is Not Astro-not" (Giya Studios and Coalition Against Death Penalty)	Winner: **Luisito Lagdameo Ignacio** - **(Byaheng Madilim)**: Eileen Cabiling - (Basurero); Chuck Gutierrez - (Heneral Rizal); Rafael Manuel - (Filipiñana); Marc Misa - (Crossing); Joey Paras - (Igib); Arjanmar Rebeta - (My Father Is Not Astro-not); Nigel Santos - (Dalaginding Na Si Isang)

=== Special awards ===
Darling of the Press	Movie Loveteam of the Year
Darling of the Press Winner: **RS Francisco**: Gretchen Barretto; Christian Bautista; Mayor Joy Belmonte; Liza Diño-Seguerra; Niño Muhlach; Piolo Pascual; Alden Richards; Alfred Vargas	Movie Loveteam of the Year Winner: **Ronnie Alonte and Loisa Andalio** (James And Pat And Dave): Joao Constancia and Alexa Ilacad (Four Sisters Before The Wedding); Joshua Garcia and Julia Barretto (Block Z); Donny Pangilinan and Loisa Andalio (James And Pat And Dave); Jeremiah Lisbo and Belle Mariano (Four Sisters Before The Wedding); JC Santos and Bela Padilla (On Vodka, Beers, and Regrets)

- Nora Aunor Ulirang Artista Lifetime Achievement Award - **Ronaldo Valdez**
- Ulirang Alagad ng Pelikula sa Likod ng Kamera Lifetime Achievement Award - **Brillante Mendoza**
