= 2021 FAMAS Awards =

Annual Filipino film awards ceremony

69th FAMAS Awards
- Date: December 13, 2021
- Site: Virtual awards ceremony

Highlights
- Best Picture: Magikland
- Most awards: Magikland (7)
- Most nominations: On Vodka, Beers, and Regrets (12)

The 69th Filipino Academy of Movie Arts and Sciences (FAMAS) Awards took place on December 13, 2021. It was meant to honor the best Filipino films released in 2020. Due to the COVID-19 pandemic, the awards was done online and posted in the organization's YouTube and Facebook pages. Also, it included some films that were released in 2021, such as Love or Money, released on online platforms by March 12, 2021.

== Winners and nominees ==
=== Awards ===
Winners are listed first, highlighted in boldface. The nominees were announced on December 1, 2021 through the FAMAS' YouTube channel. The winners were announced on that same YouTube channel twelve days later.

**Best Picture**: **Magikland**; Block Z; Fan Girl; Four Sisters Before the Wedding; Hayop Ka!; He Who Is Without Sin; Isa Pang Bahaghari; Latay; Memories of Forgetting; On Vodka, Beers, and Regrets; Tagpuan; UnTrue; Watch List	**Best Director**: **Avid Liongoren – Hayop Ka!**; **Christian Acuña – Magikland**; Antoinette Jadaone – Fan Girl; Ben Rekhi – Watch List; Irene Villamor – On Vodka, Beers, and Regrets; Joel Lamangan – Isa Pang Bahaghari
**Best Actor**: **Allen Dizon – Latay as Lando**; Alfred Vargas – Tagpuan as Allan; Coco Martin – Love or Money as Leon; Elijah Canlas – He Who Is Without Sin as Martin; JC Santos – On Vodka, Beers, and Regrets as Francis; Paulo Avelino – Fan Girl as Paulo Avelino; Xian Lim – UnTrue as Joachim Castro	**Best Actress**: **Alessandra de Rossi – Watch List as Maria**; Bela Padilla – On Vodka, Beers, and Regrets as Jane Pineda; Charlie Dizon – Fan Girl as Jane; Cristine Reyes – UnTrue as Mara Villanueva; Iza Calzado – Tagpuan as Agnes; Lovi Poe – Latay as Lori
**Best Supporting Actor**: **Enzo Pineda – He Who Is Without Sin as Lawrence**; Dominic Ochoa – Four Sisters Before the Wedding as Caloy Salazar; Ian Veneracion – Block Z as Mario; Jake Macapagal – Watch List as Lieutenant Ventura; Matteo Guidicelli – On Vodka, Beers, and Regrets as Ronnie; Micko Laurente – Watch List as Mark; Michael de Mesa – Isa Pang Bahaghari as Rhey	**Best Supporting Actress**: **Dexter Doria – Memories of Forgetting as Yvonne**; Angeli Bayani – Watch List; Carmina Villaroel – Four Sisters Before the Wedding as Grace Salazar; Dimples Romana – Block Z as Bebeth; Rhen Escaño – UnTrue as Ana Villanueva; Sanya Lopez – Isa Pang Bahaghari as Dolly; Shaina Magdayao – Tagpuan as Tanya
**Best Screenplay**: **Manny Angeles & Paulle Olivenza – Hayop Ka!**; Antoinette Jadaone – Fan Girl; Irene Villamor – On Vodka, Beers, and Regrets; Onay Sales & Ben Rekhi – Watch List; Ralston Jover – Latay; Rod Marmol & Patrick Apura – Magikland	**Best Cinematography**: **Rody Lacap – Magikland**; Boy Yniguez – UnTrue; Daniella Nowitz – Watch List; Neil Daza – Fan Girl; Pao Orendain – On Vodka, Beers, and Regrets; TM Malones – Latay
**Best Visual Effects**: **Richard Francia & Ryan Ham Grimarez – Magikland**; Master Joel Enterprises – Block Z	**Best Editing**: **Manet A. Dayrit & Sheryll Lopez – Magikland**; Arnex Nicolas – On Vodka, Beers, and Regrets; Benjamin Gonzales Tolentino – Fan Girl; Jether Amar, Manny Angeles & Avid Liongoren – Hayop Ka!; Marya Ignacio – UnTrue; Nick Ellsberg & Liza D. Espinas – Watch List
**Best Production Design**: **Ericson Navarro – Magikland**; Danny Red – Block Z; Ericson Navarro – Watch List; Ferdie Abuel – Fan Girl; Ferdie Abuel – On Vodka, Beers, and Regrets; Maolen Fadul – UnTrue	**Best Sound**: **Albert Michael Idioma & Alex Tomboc – Magikland**; Armand de Guzman, Immanuel Verona & Vince Jan Banta – Block Z; John Michael Perez, Aeriel Ellyzon Mallari, Daryl Libongco & Mikko Quizon – Hayop Ka!; Nathan Ruyle – Watch List; Nicole Amores, Rj Cantos, Daryl Libongco & Aeriel Ellyzon Mallari – On Vodka, Beers, and Regrets; Vincent Villa – Fan Girl
**Best Original Song**: **"Maibalik" by Joshua Bulot and JBK – Us Again**; "Maligaya" by Inigo Pascual – Four Sisters Before the Wedding; "Mundo" by Raphiel Shannon – On Vodka, Beers, and Regrets; "Ulan" by Bugoy Drilon – The Boy Foretold by the Stars	**Best Musical Score**: **Kean Cipriano & Brain Coat – On Vodka, Beers, and Regrets**; Emerzon Texon – Magikland; Len Calvo – Hayop Ka!; Len Calvo – UnTrue
**Best Child Performer**: **Miel Espinoza – Block Z as Ruby**; Elijah Alejo – Magikland as Mara Marapara; Joshua Eugenio – Magikland as Pat Patag	**Best Short Film**: **Solo**; Dear Mama; Lente; Mosang; Paint Me a Picture; Zomnia

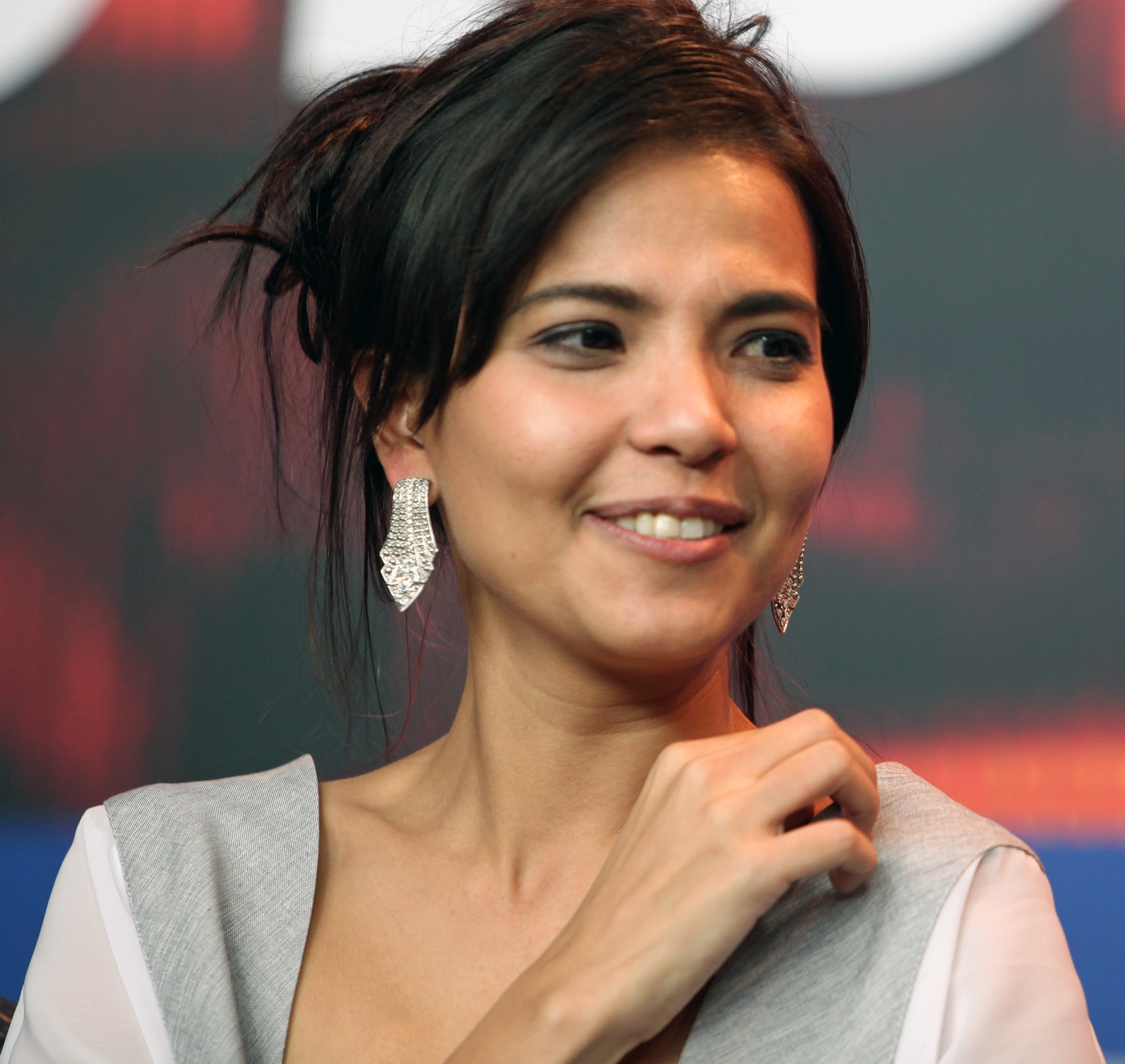
Alessandra de Rossi, Best Actress winner

== Special Honors ==
=== Fernando Poe Jr. Memorial Award ===
Mon Confiado

=== German Moreno Youth Achievement Award ===
Cassy Legaspi

Joaquin Domagoso

=== International Artist Award ===
Diane de Mesa

=== Presidential Award ===
Rowena Nina O. Taduran

=== Special awards ===
Best Filipino Beauty and Skincare Brand – Pamela Beauty Essences

Celebrities Choice for Skincare and Beauty Brand – Kissed by Nature PH

Inspiring Business Leader of the Year – Pamela Vergara-Gaspan

International CEO of the Year – RS Francisco

Outstanding Woman Business Achiever of the Year – Princess Jhoana Duran

== Stats ==
Movie	Nominations	Wins
On Vodka, Beers, and Regrets	12	1
Magikland	11	7
Watch List	11	1
Fan Girl	9	0
UnTrue	8	0
Block Z	7	1
Hayop Ka!	6	2
Latay	5	1
Tagpuan	4	0
Four Sisters Before the Wedding	4	0
Isa Pang Bahaghari	4	0
He Who Is Without Sin	3	1
Memories of Forgetting	2	1
Us Again	1	1
Love or Money	1	0
The Boy Foretold by the Stars	1	0
