= 2020 Metro Manila Summer Film Festival =

Film festival edition

2020 Metro Manila Summer Film Festival 1st Metro Manila Summer Film Festival
- No. of films: 8
- Festival date: April 11 – 21, 2020 (cancelled)

Summer MMFF chronology
- 2023

The 2020 Metro Manila Summer Film Festival was planned to be the first edition of the annual Summer Metro Manila Film Festival. It was to be organized by the MMDA in partnership with the Cinema Exhibitors Association of the Philippines. The film festival would have a theme centered on Pinoy Pride.

== Entries ==
The 2020 Metro Manila Summer Film Festival would have had eight entries. The entries would have been selected among submitted finished films produced no earlier than January 1, 2020 and films earlier submitted for the 2019 Metro Manila Film Festival finished film competition. Entries were submitted by February 15, 2020, for the full-length films. For the Short Film Competition which was opened to students, the deadline for submission was set on February 28, 2020.

On March 2, the Metro Manila Film Festival (MMFF) Executive Committee announced the eight official entries for these year first ever summer edition of the Metro Manila Film Festival. These eight films were chosen among 24 film submissions. The film festival was originally scheduled from April 11 (Black Saturday) to 21 in cinemas nationwide, however, when the cinemas were closed due to the COVID-19 pandemic, all of the films were either not released or delayed into new dates.

Title	Starring	Production company	Director	Genre	New release	
Title	Starring	Production company	Director	Genre	Method of release	Date
Tagpuan	Alfred Vargas, Shaina Magdayao, Iza Calzado	Alternative Visions	McArthur Alejandre	Romance	2020 Metro Manila Film Festival via Upstream	December 25, 2020
Love the Way U Lie	Alex Gonzaga, Xian Lim, Kylie Verzosa	Viva Films, TinCan	RC delos Reyes	Fantasy, Comedy	Netflix	August 20, 2020
Isa Pang Bahaghari	Nora Aunor, Phillip Salvador, Michael de Mesa	Heaven's Best Entertainment	Joel Lamangan	Family drama	2020 Metro Manila Film Festival via Upstream	December 25, 2020
Love or Money	Angelica Panganiban, Coco Martin	Star Cinema	Mae Cruz-Alviar	Romantic comedy	KTX.ph iWant TFC; Sky Cable PPV	March 12, 2021
Coming Home	Jinggoy Estrada, Sylvia Sanchez, Edgar Allan Guzman, Martin del Rosario	Maverick Films, ALV Films	Adolfo Alix Jr.	Family drama	2020 Metro Manila Film Festival via Upstream	December 25, 2020
A Hard Day	Dingdong Dantes, John Arcilla	Viva Films	Lawrence Fajardo	Action, Thriller	2021 Metro Manila Film Festival	December 25, 2021
Ngayon Kaya	Paulo Avelino, Janine Gutierrez	T-Rex Entertainment	Prime Cruz	Romance		June 22, 2022
The Missing	Ritz Azul, Joseph Marco, Miles Ocampo	Regal Entertainment	Easy Ferrer	Horror	2020 Metro Manila Film Festival via Upstream	December 25, 2020

== COVID-19 pandemic and cancellation ==
The inaugural Metro Manila Summer Film Festival was later cancelled due to the COVID-19 pandemic It was originally scheduled to run on April 11 – 21, 2020. The Parade of Stars was planned to be hosted in Quezon City prior to the run of the film festival and the awards night was set to be held on April 15.

One of its entries, Love the Way U Lie, was released on Netflix on August 20, 2020. While the other four entries, Coming Home, Isa Pang Bahaghari, The Missing and Tagpuan would be moved into the list of the entries in that film festival to be held in December. Love or Money was released on March 12, 2021, on KTX.ph, iWantTFC and Sky Cable PPV (supposed to be also available on Cignal PPV, but was pre-empted by the extended availability of Hello Stranger: The Movie).

Preceded by None	Metro Manila Summer Film Festival; 2020 (cancelled)	Succeeded by 2023 Metro Manila Summer Film Festival
