= 2020 Metro Manila Film Festival =

2020 film festival edition

2020 Metro Manila Film Festival 46th Metro Manila Film Festival
- Awards: Gabi ng Parangal (transl. Awards Night)
- No. of films: 10
- Festival date: December 25, 2020 to January 8, 2021

MMFF chronology
- 47th ed. 45th ed.

The 2020 Metro Manila Film Festival (MMFF) is the 46th edition of the annual Metro Manila Film Festival. It is organized by the Metropolitan Manila Development Authority (MMDA). It is the first edition of the festival to be held online due to the COVID-19 pandemic, and also the first to make its entries available to an audience outside the Philippines as part of the festival's official run.

== Impact of the COVID-19 pandemic ==
Due to the COVID-19 pandemic, the 2020 Metro Manila Film Festival was modified into a digital event. The Metropolitan Manila Development Authority (MMDA) announced on November 24, 2020, that the film festival would go digital due to the government implemented community quarantine classifications in the Metro area, in partnership with Upstream and GMovies, a streaming provider and ticket provider respectively, to stream the official entries. The festival is also co-presented by the telecommunications company Globe Telecom.

The Parade of Stars and the Gabi ng Parangal (Awards Night), both part of the annual MMFF, was also streamed online in compliance with health and safety protocols for COVID-19. This annual event is primarily to promote and enhance the preservation of the Philippine cinema. The proceeds from the film festival went to a number of beneficiaries in the film industry. The Parade of the Stars, the film festival's traditional float motorcade, was also modified due to the pandemic.

Some of the entry films were released in cinemas after the official run of the 2020 MMFF already such as Pakboys Takusa that was released on January 8, Suarez: The Healing Priest on January 15 and Magikland on February 12 in select cinemas.

== Entries ==
=== Feature films ===
The following was the criteria used in determining the final 10 entries:
1. Artistic excellence (40.0%)
2. Commercial appeal (40.0%)
3. Filipino sensibility (10.0%)
4. Global appeal (10.0%)

Previously, the Metro Manila Film Festival usually had eight feature films as official entries which are screened in cinemas across the Philippines. However, due to the COVID-19 pandemic, which forced the temporary closure of cinemas in the country, the film festival was modified and all entries were streamed online instead. The number of entries was also expanded to ten from eight, with all ten entries being announced on November 24, 2020. The ten films part of the "digital" film festival were made available starting December 25, through Upstream. The official run of the film festival will be until January 8, 2021.

The film festival entries were also made available to people outside the Philippines. The move was made specifically with the Overseas Filipino Workers demographic in mind.

Title	Starring	Production company	Director	Genre
Coming Home (Note: This film was originally nominated for the inaugural Summer Film Festival, which was cancelled because of the pandemic, but it was instead promoted as an official entry in this film festival.)	Jinggoy Estrada, Sylvia Sanchez, Edgar Allan Guzman	Maverick Films, ALV Films	Adolfo Alix Jr.	Family drama
Fan Girl	Paulo Avelino, Charlie Dizon	Black Sheep Productions, Globe Studios, Project 8 Corner San Joaquin Projects, Epic Media, Crossword Productions	Antoinette Jadaone	Drama
Isa Pang Bahaghari	Nora Aunor, Phillip Salvador, Michael de Mesa	Heaven's Best Entertainment	Joel Lamangan	Family drama
Magikland	Miggs Cuaderno, Elijah Alejo, Jun Urbano	Brightlight Leisure Productions, Gallaga Reyes Films	Christian Acuna	Fantasy, Adventure
Mang Kepweng: Ang Lihim ng Bandanang Itim	Vhong Navarro, Barbie Imperial	Cineko Productions, Star Cinema	Topel Lee	Comedy
Pakboys Takusa	Janno Gibbs, Dennis Padilla, Jerald Napoles, Andrew E.	Viva Films	Al Tantay	Comedy
Suarez: The Healing Priest	John Arcilla, Alice Dixson	Saranggola Media Productions, Viva Films	Joven Tan	Biopic
Tagpuan	Alfred Vargas, Iza Calzado, Shaina Magdayao	Alternative Vision Cinema	MacArthur Alejandre	Romance
The Boy Foretold by the Stars	Adrian Lindayag, Keann Johnson	Clever Minds Inc., The Dolly Collection, Brainstormers Lab	Dolly Dulu	Romantic comedy
The Missing	Joseph Marco, Miles Ocampo, Ritz Azul	Regal Entertainment	Easy Ferrer	Horror

==== Previous entries ====
Prior to the changes made to transform the 2020 Metro Manila Film Festival into a digital event, it was planned that this edition of the film festival was to have eight official entries as customarily done. The MMDA announced four films, supposed to be the first of eight entries, was announced to be part of the 2020 film festival on July 17, 2020, despite cinemas in the country already closed at the time due to COVID-19 pandemic. These films were selected based on submitted scripts.

However, only one of those first entries made it through the official entries by November, namely Brightlight's Magikland. Several of the entries for the December festival were entries for the proposed MMFF Summer edition, which did not push through because of the pandemic.

The following table lists the three previously-announced entries that are no longer part of the film festival.

Title	Starring	Production company	Director	Genre	New release date	Method of release
Ang Mga Kaibigan ni Mama Susan	Joshua Garcia, Angie Ferro	Regal Entertainment	Chito S. Roño	Horror	May 18, 2023	Amazon Prime Video
The Exorsis	Toni Gonzaga, Alex Gonzaga	TINCAN	Fifth Solomon	Horror, Comedy	December 25, 2021	2021 Metro Manila Film Festival
Praybeyt Benjamin 3	Vice Ganda, Ivana Alawi	Star Cinema	Cathy Garcia-Sampana	Comedy, Adventure	TBA	

=== Short films ===
A short film competition for students was organized as part of the film festival. An undetermined number of entries were originally part of the short film competition of the cancelled 2020 Metro Manila Summer Film Festival. Like their feature film counterparts, the entries were made available online through Upstream.

Title	School	Director
AaBaKaDa	De La Salle-College of Saint Benilde	Tyrone James Luanzon
Sala, Salin-Laway	De La Salle-College of Saint Benilde	Daniella Verzosa
Sina Alexa, Xander at Ang Universe	De La Salle-College of Saint Benilde	Vahn Leinard Pascual
Paano Maging Babae	De La Salle-College of Saint Benilde	Gian Arre
Balik-Bayan	University of Makati	Joshua Pichay
Kyokok (Nilingaw)	Western Mindanao State University	
Lipstick	Philippine High School for the Arts	
Paraisong Parisukat	Philippine High School for the Arts	
Laruang Baril	Far Eastern University	Edrian Cabudbud
Garbo	University of Southeastern Philippines	Jeziah Rabbi Salvar

== Parade of Stars ==
The Parade of Stars was held as a virtual event prior to the film festival's official opening day. Traditionally, the event is organized as a float parade but the event was instead held as a 4-hour virtual event. The 2020 MMFF was opened by MMDA Chairman Danilo Lim and Quezon City Mayor Joy Belmonte since Quezon City is the designated host of the film festival. The cast and director of each of the MMFF's ten official entry films answered questions from the audience and select members of the media. As part of a "virtual" parade, a "virtual" float was featured prior to each of the ten official entries' segment.

== Streaming ==
The official entries for the 2020 Metro Manila Film Festival were not screened in cinemas, which were closed due to the COVID-19 pandemic. Instead, the films were made available online through transactional video on demand platform, Upstream. Tickets for the films were made available through GMovies, a payment platform by Globe Telecom. Tickets were made available for purchase starting December 7 for patrons based in the Philippines and on December 18 for people outside the country but the films themselves were only watchable starting December 25, 2020, the official opening day of the film festival. The films is available to stream up to five days after ticket purchase, but once the film was played, the certain media is only viewable for 24 hours. The films can be rewatched for unlimited times within said 24-hour period from the first playback.

== Awards ==
2020 Metro Manila Film Festival Gabi ng Parangal
- Date: December 27, 2020
- Site: Project Space, Makati
- Hosted by: Marco Gumabao and Kylie Verzosa

Highlights
- Best Picture: Fan Girl
- Best Director: Antoinette Jadaone (Fan Girl)
- Best Actor: Paulo Avelino (Fan Girl)
- Best Actress: Charlie Dizon (Fan Girl)
- Most awards: Fan Girl (8)

The Gabi ng Parangal (transl. Awards Night) of the 2020 Metro Manila Film Festival was held virtually on December 27, 2020. The awards night was hosted by Marco Gumabao and Kylie Verzosa from Globe Telecom's Project Space studio in Makati.

Awardees were announced via the MMDA's Official Facebook Page. The nominees were announced on December 24, 2020.

=== Major awards ===
Winners are listed first, highlighted in boldface, and indicated with a double dagger (‡). Nominations are also listed if applicable.

Best Picture	Best Director
**Fan Girl – Black Sheep Productions, Globe Studios**‡; The Boy Foretold by the Stars – Clever Minds Inc. (2nd Best Picture); Tagpuan – Alternative Vision Cinema (3rd Best Picture)	**Antoinette Jadaone – Fan Girl**‡; MacArthur Alejandre – Tagpuan; Christian Acuña – Magikland; Dolly Dulu – The Boy Foretold by the Stars; Easy Ferrer – The Missing
Best Actor	Best Actress
**Paulo Avelino – Fan Girl**‡; John Arcilla – Suarez: The Healing Priest; Adrian Lindayag – The Boy Foretold by the Stars; Phillip Salvador – Isa Pang Bahaghari	**Charlie Dizon – Fan Girl**‡; Nora Aunor – Isa Pang Bahaghari; Ritz Azul – The Missing; Iza Calzado – Tagpuan; Sylvia Sanchez – Coming Home
Best Supporting Actor	Best Supporting Actress
**Michael de Mesa – Isa Pang Bahaghari**‡; Edgar Allan Guzman – Coming Home; Zanjoe Marudo – Isa Pang Bahaghari; John Leinard Ramos – The Boy Foretold by the Stars; Dante Rivero – Suarez: The Healing Priest	**Shaina Magdayao – Tagpuan**‡; Jaclyn Jose – Mang Kepweng: Ang Lihim ng Bandanang Itim; Miles Ocampo – The Missing; Bibeth Orteza – Magikland; Rosanna Roces – Suarez: The Healing Priest
Best Child Performer	Best Screenplay
**Seiyo Masunaga – The Missing**‡; Jana Agoncillo – Coming Home; Miguel Gabriel Diokno – Tagpuan; Ryan Jay Obana – Tagpuan	**Antoinette Jadaone – Fan Girl**‡; Dolly Dulu – The Boy Foretold by the Stars; Easy Ferrer – The Missing; Ricardo Lee – Tagpuan; Gina Marisa Tagasa – Coming Home
Best Cinematography	Best Production Design
**Neil Daza – Fan Girl**‡; Teejay Gonzalez – Suarez: The Healing Priest; Rody Lacap – Magikland; David Carlo Mendoza, Alberto Monteras II, Daniel Uy – Tagpuan; Marvin Reyes – The Boy Foretold by the Stars; Marvin Reyes – The Missing	**Ericson Navarro – Magikland**‡; Popo Diaz – The Missing; Ronnie Dizon – Suarez: The Healing Priest; Lars Magbanua – The Boy Foretold by the Stars; Ericson Navarro – Tagpuan
Best Editing	Best Sound
**Benjamin Tolentino – Fan Girl**‡; Renewin Alano – The Missing; Mai Calaparado – Isa Pang Bahaghari; Manet Dayrit, She Lopez Francia – Magikland; Carlo Francisco Manatad – Tagpuan	**Vincent Villa – Fan Girl**‡; Albert Michael Idioma – Tagpuan; Albert Michael Idioma, Alex Tomboc – Magikland; Pietro Marco Javier, Jannina Mikaela Minglanilla – The Boy Foretold by the Stars; Fatima Nerrika Salim, Emmanuel Verona – The Missing
Best Original Theme Song	Best Musical Score
**"Ulan" from The Boy Foretold by the Stars – Written by Jhay Cura/Pau Protacio**‡; "Ganyan ang Pag-ibig ko" from Coming Home – Written by Lito Camo; "Yakapin Mo Ako" from Suarez: The Healing Priest – Written by Joven Tan; "Hanggang Muli" from Isa Pang Bahaghari – Written by Emerson Texon; "Smile" from Magikland – Written by Emerzon Texon	**Emerzon Texon – Magikland**‡; Teresa Barrozo – Fan Girl; Sherwin Castillo – Suarez: The Healing Priest; Jessie Lasaten – The Missing; Paulo Protacio – The Boy Foretold by the Stars
Best Visual Effects	Best Virtual Float
**Richard Francia, Ryan Grimarez – Magikland**‡; Luminous Films – The Missing; Gerwin Meneses – Mang Kepweng: Ang Lihim ng Bandanang Itim	**Magikland**‡; Isa Pang Bahaghari; Fan Girl
Gatpuno Antonio J. Villegas Cultural Award	Fernando Poe Jr. Memorial Award for Excellence
**Suarez: The Healing Priest**‡; The Boy Foretold by the Stars; Coming Home; Isa Pang Bahaghari; Magikland	**Magikland**‡; Coming Home; Isa Pang Bahaghari; Suarez: The Healing Priest
Special Jury Prize	Gender Sensitivity Award
**Peque Gallaga**‡	**The Boy Foretold by the Stars**‡; Coming Home; Isa Pang Bahaghari

==== Other awards ====
- Manay Ichu Vera-Perez Maceda Memorial Award – **Gloria Romero**

=== Short Film category ===
- Best Student Short Film – **Paano Maging Babae** by **Gian Arre** from **De La Salle–College of Saint Benilde**

=== Multiple awards ===
Awards	Film
8	Fan Girl
5	Magikland
3	The Boy Foretold by the Stars
2	Tagpuan

=== Multiple nominations ===
Nominations	Film
12	Magikland
12	The Boy Foretold by the Stars
11	Isa Pang Bahaghari
11	Tagpuan
10	Fan Girl
10	The Missing
9	Suarez: The Healing Priest
8	Coming Home
2	Mang Kepweng: Ang Lihim ng Bandanang Itim

== Box office gross ==
No official figures or film rankings was immediately released regarding the box office gross of the 2020 Metro Manila Film Festival entries. According to Quezon City Representative Alfred Vargas, during a House of Representatives probe on online piracy of the 2020 MMFF entries, claimed that the 2020 MMFF entries grossed only ₱19 million in total. In December 2021, MMFF spokesperson Noel Ferrer said that the 2020 MMFF earned less than ₱50 million.

== Notes ==
Preceded by 2019 Metro Manila Film Festival	Metro Manila Film Festival; 2020	Succeeded by 2021 Metro Manila Film Festival
