= For Love or Money (Philippine TV series) =

- Title card
- Genre: Drama; Romance
- Developed by: Elmer L. Gatchalian
- Directed by: Mac C. Alejandre
- Starring: Derek Ramsay; Ritz Azul; Alice Dixson
- Theme music composer: Lara Maigue
- Opening theme: "Sa 'Yo Na Lang Ako" by Lara Maigue
- Country of origin: Philippines
- Original language: Tagalog
- No. of episodes: 14

Production
- Production locations: Metro Manila, Philippines
- Running time: 30-45 minutes

Original release
- Network: TV5
- Release: October 17, 2013 – January 16, 2014

For Love or Money is a Philippine television drama series broadcast by TV5. Directed by Mac Alejandre, it stars Alice Dixson, Derek Ramsay and Ritz Azul. It aired on the network's evening line up from October 17, 2013 to January 16, 2014, replacing Sine Ko 5ingko and was replaced by Obsession.

== Overview ==
Roselle and Edward are a young ambitious couple struggling to achieve their dreams, until they cross paths with the wealthy and beautiful Kristine, who offers Roselle 10 million pesos for 10 days with Edward.

== Cast ==
=== Main cast ===
- Alice Dixson as Kristine Almonte - Kristine inherited her family's shipping empire. Having grown up wealthy, she feels she could achieve anything she wants with the right price. Yet all these outward signs of success can't hide the fact that Kristine is lonely—until she meets Edward, to whom she makes an irresistible offer of 10 million pesos for 10 days with him for reasons only she knows.
- Derek Ramsay as Edward Villanueva - Edward owns a small production house that covers events, but the money he earns is just enough to provide for him and his ambitious wife Roselle. When Kristine offers him 10 million pesos in exchange for 10 days with him, Edward and Roselle consider the rewards and consequences of choosing the life-changing money over their love for each other.
- Ritz Azul as Roselle Villanueva - Smart, beautiful but lacking in confidence, Roselle is a regular office worker who dreams of a better life. She loves her husband Edward deeply, but can't give him the one thing that would complete them: a baby. As she's constantly worrying about becoming rich, she feels that they are not yet ready for that kind of responsibility. Suddenly faced with Kristine's tempting offer, will Roselle lend her husband to achieve the life that she's always yearned for?

=== Supporting cast ===
- Edward Mendez as Benj - Benj is Edward's best friend.
- Ricci Chan as Ambet - Ambet is Kristine's confidante.
- Via Antonio as Joy - Joy is Roselle's best friend.
