= Mang Kepweng: Ang Lihim ng Bandanang Itim =

2020 Filipino fantasy comedy horror film

- Official release poster
- Directed by: Topel Lee
- Screenplay by: Ferdi Aguas; Ricky Victoria; Angel San Jose
- Story by: Enrico Roque; Ferdinand Navarro
- Produced by: Carlo Katigbak; Olivia Lamasan; Enrico A. Roque
- Starring: Vhong Navarro
- Cinematography: Ab Garcia
- Edited by: Chrisel Desuasido
- Music by: Carmina Cuya
- Production companies: Cineko Productions; ABS-CBN Films
- Distributed by: Star Cinema (theatrical distribution rights); GMA Pictures (TV & streaming rights)
- Release date: December 25, 2020
- Running time: 101 minutes
- Country: Philippines
- Language: Filipino

Mang Kepweng: Ang Lihim ng Bandanang Itim (transl. Mang Kepweng: The Secret of the Black Bandana) is a 2020 Philippine fantasy horror-comedy film directed by Topel Lee starring Vhong Navarro. It is a sequel of the 2017 film, Mang Kepweng Returns and is an official entry to the 2020 Metro Manila Film Festival. Unlike the first film, this film is distributed by Star Cinema. Additionally, the current distributor of this film was acquired by GMA Films Distribution.

== Premise ==
Mang Kepweng (Vhong Navarro) continues to heal people from various illnesses using his mystical scarf. However, the scarf's powers began to wane as Kepweng becomes too obsessed with it. He embarks on a quest to find three ingredients in order to restore the scarf's powers and establish himself as its rightful owner.

== Cast ==
=== Main Cast ===
- Vhong Navarro as Kieffer Rivera/ Mang Kepweng

=== Supporting Cast ===
- Barbie Imperial as Devie/ Debbielyn Tolonges
- Joross Gamboa as Maximus Tolonges
- Jacklyn Jose as Milagros
- Benjie Paras as Hero
- Ion Perez as Einstein
- Ryan Bang as Janwick
- Ritz Azul as Reyna Marikit/ Princess Alissandra
- Yamyam Gucong as Disappear
- Fumiya Sankai as Appear
- Lotlot de Leon as Mother Lili-Lili
- Mariko Ledesma as Queen Reyna Sardinia Seguion-Reyna, Queen of the Lake of Lamentations
- Alora Sasam as Princesa Magdalena, Princess of manananggal
- Caloy Alde as Haring Hap-hap, King of manananggal
- Patricia Roxas as Princesa Magayon
- Nikko Natividad as Heronimo
- Rubi Rubi as Tandang Bruha
- Hector Macaso as Tikboy/Kapre

=== Special Appearances ===
- Lou Veloso as Mr. Tolonges, Maximus's Grandfather
- Samy Villaresis as Monyo
- KaladKaren as KaladKaren Davila (reporter)
- Chad Kinis as Deedee
- Petite

== Release ==
Mang Kepweng: Ang Lihim ng Bandanang Itim was reportedly a submission for the supposed inaugural edition of the Metro Manila Summer Film Festival in April 2020, which was later cancelled due to the COVID-19 pandemic. However, it was not among the official entries prior to the film festival's cancellation.

The film was then included as one of the ten official entries of the 2020 Metro Manila Film Festival and was made available online through UpStream from December 25, 2020, to January 8, 2021.

== See also ==
- List of ghost films

== Accolades ==
Year	Award-giving body	Category	Recipient	Result
2020	Metro Manila Film Festival	Best Supporting Actress	Jaclyn Jose	Nominated
2020	Metro Manila Film Festival	Best Visual Effects	Gerwin Meneses	Nominated
