= The Achy Breaky Hearts =

- Theatrical film poster
- Directed by: Antoinette Jadaone
- Screenplay by: Yoshke Dimen; Antoinette Jadaone
- Story by: Antoinette Jadaone
- Produced by: Charo Santos-Concio; Malou N. Santos
- Starring: Jodi Sta. Maria; Richard Yap; Ian Veneracion
- Cinematography: Pong Ignacio
- Music by: Emerzon Texon
- Production company: ABS-CBN Film Productions
- Distributed by: Star Cinema
- Release date: June 29, 2016
- Country: Philippines
- Languages: Filipino; English
- Box office: ₱120 million

The Achy Breaky Hearts is a 2016 Filipino romantic comedy film directed by Antoinette Jadaone and starring Ian Veneracion, Richard Yap and Jodi Sta. Maria. The film was produced by Star Cinema and released on June 29, 2016, in theaters nationwide.

The film was inspired by the 1992 pop hit of the same title by American singer Billy Ray Cyrus.

The film was also intended to cash-in on the success of two of Jodi Sta. Maria's previous TV projects: Be Careful With My Heart, where she starred opposite Richard Yap, and Pangako Sa 'Yo, a remake where she starred opposite Ian Veneracion.

== Synopsis ==
Chinggay (Jodi Sta. Maria), a jewelry shop manager, is one of the single women in their 30s who feels the pressure to find love. She goes out on dates with men but none of them seem to make the cut. You may blame her high standards but the pain from her previous relationship could also be affecting her judgment on men. Now, her love life is suffering a drought for seven years. Everything changes when suddenly, two men are interested to be with her. Ryan (Ian Veneracion) bought an engagement ring from Chinggay only to be rejected by his girlfriend. Chinggay helps Ryan to get back with his girlfriend but they end up losing the ring and becoming good friends. On the other hand, Chinggay’s ex-boyfriend Frank (Richard Yap) is persistent to redeem himself and to prove that he deserves a second chance with Chinggay. Chinggay finds herself torn between two kinds of love. A guy who she still loves, and a guy she now loves. Will she choose one over the other? Or will she realize that the love that she needs won’t come from either?

== Cast ==
=== Main cast ===
- Jodi Sta. Maria as Chinggay Villanueva
- Richard Yap as Frank Sison
- Ian Veneracion as Ryan Martinez

=== Supporting cast ===
- Beauty Gonzalez as Ingrid
- Sarah Lahbati as Martha
- Desiree Del Valle as Corrine
- Erika Padilla as Maxie
- Denise Joaquin as Joan
- Khalil Ramos as Keith
- Shamaine Buencamino as Aida Villanueva
- Miles Ocampo as Jenny Villanueva
- John Spainhour as Chino
- Elizabeth Ty Chua
- Yuan Francisco as Aaron
- Eda Nolan as Trisha Villanueva
- Bernard Palanca as Joan's boyfriend
- Angie Ferro as Lola Minang
- Michael Flores

== Piracy issue ==
Days after the movie's theater release, a pirated copy of it had been leaked online on social media and filesharing sites. The director and the cast all tweeted against piracy and had sworn to take legal actions against everyone responsible for the leak.
