= Near Death (2025 film) =

- Theatrical release poster
- Directed by: Richard V. Somes
- Written by: Richard V. Somes
- Produced by: Richard V. Somes
- Starring: Charlie Dizon; RK Bagatsing; Xyriel Manabat; Soliman Cruz; Joel Torre; Lotlot de Leon
- Production companies: Diamond Productions; CMB Film Services; RVS Studios
- Distributed by: ILD Film Production
- Release date: October 29, 2025
- Running time: 94 minutes
- Country: Philippines
- Language: Filipino

Near Death is a 2025 Philippine supernatural horror film written, directed and produced by Richard V. Somes. It stars Charlie Dizon, Xyriel Manabat and RK Bagatsing. The film is about a girl named Julia, who is haunted by supernatural beings who want to enter her body and use it as a vessel after she survives as suicide attempt.

Near Death is Richard Somes's comeback film to the horror genre after Yanggaw (2008) and Corazon: Ang Unang Aswang (2012).

== Cast ==
- Charlie Dizon as Julia
- Xyriel Manabat as Mia
- RK Bagatsing as Lucas
- Lotlot de Leon as Aling Salve
- Soliman Cruz
- Joel Torre

== Release ==
The film was released in SM Cinemas on October 29, 2025, as one of the entries of 2025 Sine Sindak Horror Film Festival.

== Reception ==
Josh Mercado of News.ABS-CBN.com gave the film a positive review, saying it "wasn't overloaded by razzle-dazzle, but it did feature a remarkable performance showdown between Dizon and Xyriel Manabat".

Alwin Ignacio of Daily Tribune also gave the film positive feedback, writing; "Near Death is that kind of cinema that allows you to ponder, lets you weigh what is artifice and what is genuine, allows you to do a showdown with the man or woman they see, and the man and woman you talk to in front of the mirror and most of the times snaps back at you, and makes you value what matters in this crazy planet we all live in".
