= Saka-saka =

Philippine action film

- Directed by: Toto Natividad
- Screenplay by: Manuel Buising
- Story by: Toto Natividad; Willy Laconsay; Manuel Buising
- Produced by: Richard Reynante; Malou N. Santos; Charo Santos-Concio
- Starring: Ejay Falcon; Joseph Marco
- Cinematography: Jessamy Leaño
- Edited by: John Wong
- Music by: Diwa de Leon
- Production company: CineBro
- Distributed by: Star Cinema
- Release date: December 18, 2013
- Running time: 97 minutes
- Country: Philippines
- Language: Filipino

Saka-saka is a 2013 Filipino action film co-written and directed by Toto Natividad. The film stars Ejay Falcon and Joseph Marco. It was one of the entries in the 2013 Metro Manila Film Festival under the New Wave category.

== Cast ==
- Ejay Falcon as Alex
  - BJ Forbes as Young Alex
- Joseph Marco as Abner
  - Nathaniel Britt as Young Abner
- Akiko Solon as Nadia
- Baron Geisler as Balneg
- Kathleen Hermosa as Alissa
- Perla Bautista as Minyang
- Toby Alejar as Gov. Lontilla
- Martin Imperial as Gov. Lontilla's Son
  - Gold Aceron as Young Gov. Lontilla's Son
- Mon Confiado as Guido
- Rey Solo as Turo
  - Troy De Guzman as Old Turo
- Richard Manabat as Gov. Fuentebella
- Jairus Aquino as Young Sakasaka
- Gigi Locsin as Mayor Miling Villena
- Teresita Gonzales as Carissa
- Gemma Masas as Kapanalig
- Dindo Gonzales as Spy
- Joseph Ison as Old Edring
- Jerome Ponce as Friend of Alex
- Marlo Mortel as Friend of Abner

== Reception ==
Christine Denny of Philippine Entertainment Portal gave Saka-saka a positive review. She praised the clear portrayal of the characters played Ejay Falcon and Joseph Marco, as well as the clear view based on true events regarding political killings in the provinces. She also praised Falcon for performing his own stunts in his first action film, while noting that he needs more practice when it comes to physical fight scenes.

== Accolades ==
Year	Awards	Category	Recipient	Result	Ref.
2013	39th Manila New Wave Film Festival	Best Picture	Saka-saka	Nominated	
