= Steak (Maalaala Mo Kaya) =

- Maalaala Mo Kaya episode
- Episode no.: Season 27; Episode 5
- Directed by: Elfren Vibar
- Written by: Mae Rose Balanay
- Original air date: February 9, 2019

Guest appearances
- Joseph Marco as Christopher Lawrence "Bong" Go; Phillip Salvador as Rodrigo Duterte; Meg Imperial as Emmylou Go

Episode chronology
← Previous "Family Portrait"	Next → "White Ribbon"

"Steak" is the fifth episode of the 27th season of the Filipino drama anthology series Maalaala Mo Kaya (MMK). Written by Mae Rose Balanay and directed by Elfren Vibar, it aired on ABS-CBN in the Philippines on February 9, 2019. The episode depicts the early life of Christopher Lawrence "Bong" Go, played by Joseph Marco.

Upon the episode's announcement on February 2, 2019, it was met with controversy due to the episode airing while Bong Go was a candidate for the 2019 Philippine Senate election; "Steak" was broadcast three days before the official campaign period for the candidates.

== Production ==
The episode was first reported on January 23, 2019 in an article from PEP.ph, which stated that Dominic Ochoa was cast as Bong Go. It would only be officially announced on February 2 by the Twitter account of the MMK television series, with Bong Go to actually be played by Joseph Marco.

== Reception ==
On the Saturday it aired, "Steak" received a rating of 25.0% according to Kantar Media, ahead of another weekend anthology program Magpakailanman, which received 14.1% for its episode about the family of another then-current senatorial candidate, Cynthia Villar.

After watching the episode, Bong Go was "humbled" by it and considered the episode to be accurate to what his life has been like ("What you saw was true, you witnessed that you would really not have time for your children and your family in a job like this").
