= The Missing (2020 film) =

- Official release poster
- Directed by: Easy Ferrer
- Written by: Easy Ferrer
- Produced by: Lily Y. Monteverde; Roselle Y. Monteverde
- Starring: Ritz Azul; Joseph Marco; Miles Ocampo
- Cinematography: Marvin Reyes
- Edited by: Renewin Alano
- Music by: Jessie Lasaten
- Production companies: Regal Films; Regal Multimedia Inc.
- Distributed by: Regal Films Distribution
- Release date: December 25, 2020
- Country: Philippines
- Languages: Filipino; Japanese

The Missing is a 2020 Philippine horror film directed by Easy Ferrer under Regal Films starring Ritz Azul, Joseph Marco, and Miles Ocampo. It is one of the official entries for the 2020 Metro Manila Film Festival.

== Premise ==
Iris (Ritz Azul), a 28-year-old architect often hallucinates due to suffering from post-traumatic stress disorder after losing her younger sister to a kidnapping syndicate. Meanwhile, Job (Joseph Marco), who is also an architect and an ex-lover of Iris, invites Iris to go to Japan for a job opportunity. The Missing also follows Len (Miles Ocampo), a graduating student who was born and has spent her childhood in Saga, Japan.

== Cast ==
- Ritz Azul as Iris
- Joseph Marco as Job
- Miles Ocampo as Len
- Melissa Mendez
- Seiyo Masunaga as Aki
- Joe Ishikawa as Riku Watanabe

Japanese actors were also part of the cast.

== Production ==
The Missing was produced under Regal Entertainment under the direction of Easy Ferrer. The film is Ferrer's first horror movie. Filming for The Missing reportedly took place in the Saga prefecture in Japan for eight to ten days, with Ferrer noting that he has incorporated Japanese horror to Philippine horror in making the film. The film's director also cited his experience of post traumatic stress disorder, ten years earlier from the film's release as is his primary inspiration for The Missing. Ferrer wrote the script in 2013, during the time the Ampatuan massacre in Maguindanao was still a widely-talked issue in the Philippines and used the issue of violence against journalists and other media personnel as a theme in the film. After completing the script's draft, Ferrer then revised the script to "fit the Japanese intrusion". Regal Films executive producer Roselle Monteverde and fellow director Joey Reyes were also part of The Missing's creative process.

== Release ==
The Missing will be made available digitally through Upstream starting December 25, 2020, as one of the official entries of the 2020 Metro Manila Film Festival (MMFF). Ang Mga Kaibigan ni Mama Susan, a film adaptation of a novel of the same name by Bob Ong was supposed to be Regal Film's 2020 MMFF entry, but they had to withdraw the film due to delays on Mama Susan's post-production due to the COVID-19 pandemic and submitted The Missing as its entry for the film festival instead. It was also previously selected as an official entry for the 2020 Metro Manila Summer Film Festival, which was later cancelled. The Missing will also mark its director's debut in the MMFF.
