= Love the Way U Lie =

2020 Filipino comedy film

- Official poster
- Directed by: RC Delos Reyes
- Screenplay by: Danno Kristoper C. Mariquit
- Story by: Alex Gonzaga; Danno Kristoper C. Mariquit
- Produced by: Jaime G. Baltazar; Vic del Rosario Jr.; Toni Gonzaga; Elle Lumanlan; Mon Lumanlan; Rafa Lumanlan; Jayart Tugade
- Starring: Xian Lim; Alex Gonzaga; Kylie Verzosa
- Cinematography: Lee Mariano
- Edited by: Noah Tonga
- Production companies: Viva Films; TinCan
- Distributed by: Netflix
- Release date: August 20, 2020
- Country: Philippines
- Language: Filipino

Love the Way U Lie is a 2020 Philippine romantic comedy film directed by RC Delos Reyes, starring Alex Gonzaga and Xian Lim. The film was produced by Viva films and TinCan.

The film was originally slated for theatrical release on April 11, 2020, and was due to part for one of the official film entries in the inaugural Metro Manila Summer Film Festival, but the festival was cancelled due to the COVID-19 pandemic. It was then released on August 20, 2020, on Netflix.

== Plot ==
Nathan Torres (Xian Lim) was an online business designer who still fanatically grieved the demise of his wife Sara (Kylie Verzosa) one year prior. Stacey Likauko (Alex Gonzaga) is a psychic who told fortunes and sold Chinese knickknacks on Plaza Miranda. At the point when the two ran into each other, the soul of Sara would talk through Stacey to persuade Nathan to let her go and move on with their relationship.

== Cast ==
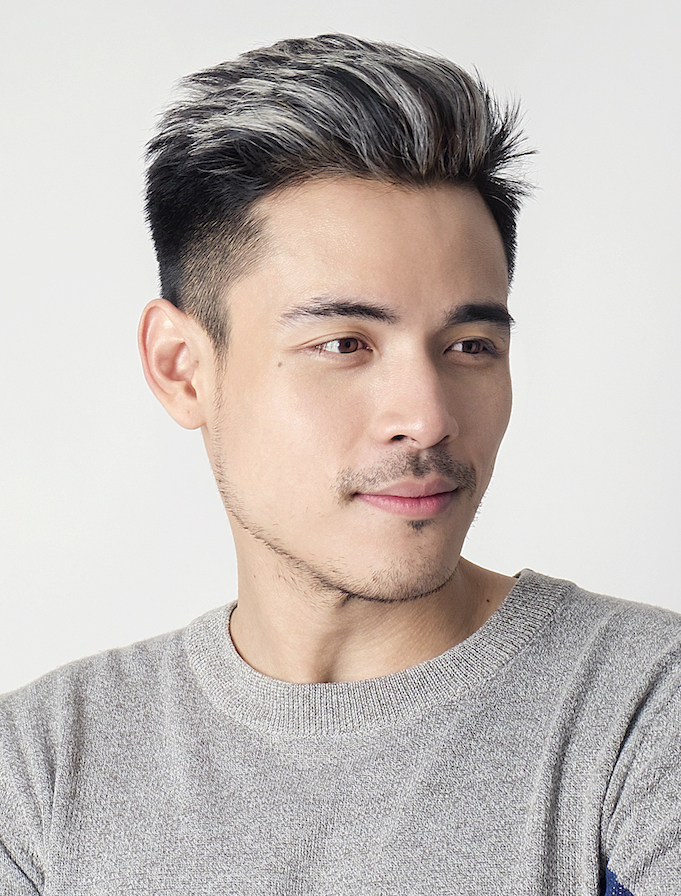
Xian Lim, Portrays Nathan Torres

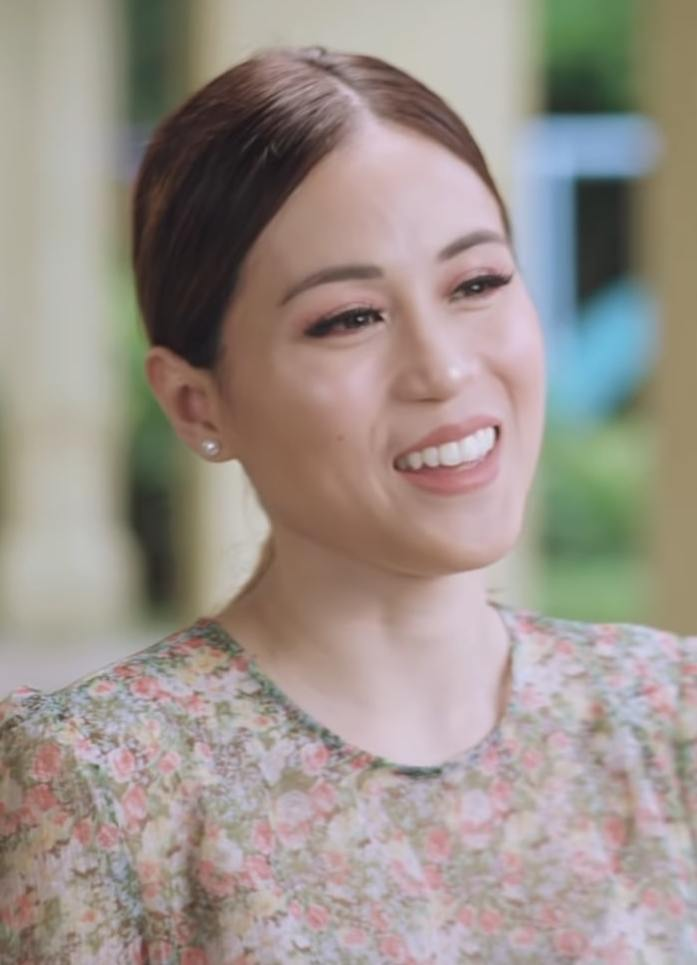
Toni Gonzaga as herself in Cameo Role Appearance

- Xian Lim as Nathan Torres
- Alex Gonzaga as Stacey Likauko
- Kylie Verzosa as Sara Torres
- Jeric Raval as Don Likauko
- Kim Molina as Janna
- Chad Kinis as Pao
- Arvic James Tan as Nix
- Gab Lagman as Marc
- Abby Bautista as Ingrid
- Sarah Pagcaliwagan as Quiapo Customer
- Marty Marcelo as Monica Lhuilley
- Toni Gonzaga as herself
- Jake Cuenca as himself

== Production ==
On August 21–22, 2020, the film ranked number 1 on Netflix Philippines.
