= Antoinette Jadaone =

Filipino film and television director

- Born: Antoinette B. Jadaone; 3 April 1984 (age 42); Manila, Philippines
- Other name: Tonet Jadaone
- Education: University of the Philippines Diliman
- Occupations: Director, Writer, Screenwriter, Producer
- Years active: 2010–present

Antoinette Hilario Jadaone (Tagalog: [an.to.iˈnɛt hi.laˈɾi.o ha.daʊˈne];born April 3, 1984), sometimes credited as Tonet Jadaone, is a Filipino filmmaker and podcast host. She is best known for directing That Thing Called Tadhana (2014), Love You to the Stars and Back (2017), Never Not Love You (2018), Alone/Together (2019), Fan Girl (2020), and Sunshine (2024). Jadaone was also a resident director for ABS-CBN Entertainment and Star Cinema.

Aside from directing and producing films, she is the co-host of the podcast Ang Walang Kwentang Podcast alongside fellow director JP Habac.

== Directing style ==
Jadaone is known for her focus on contemporary romance and socially aware storytelling. Her films have consistently centered women who are portrayed as complex, relatable, and multidimensional characters.

Her influences include filmmakers Ishmael Bernal and Joyce Bernal, whom she admired for their ability to infuse social relevance within romantic-comedy themes Jadaone has also credited Joyce Bernal and Irene Villamor as her mentors. Early in her career, she worked on their teams, primarily as a script continuity supervisor, where she credited them for shaping her work ethic as a director.

== Filmography ==
=== Film ===
Year	Title	Director	Writer	Producer	Continuity supervisor	Notes	Ref.
2004	Plano	Yes	Yes	Yes	No	Student short film Also cinematographer, editor, sound recordist	
2006	Saling Pusa	Yes	Yes	Yes	No	Student short film Also production designer, additional editing	
2008	Tumbang Preso	Yes	Yes	Yes	No	Short film	
2008	For the First Time	No	No	No	Yes		
2009	Kimmy Dora: Kambal sa Kiyeme	No	No	No	Yes		
2009	Ito ang Gabing Babalikan Kita; Pagkatapos ng Tatlong Taon; Nang Hindi Na Maiiyak at Masasaktan	Yes	Yes	Yes	No	Short film	
2011	Six Degrees of Separation from Lilia Cuntapay	Yes	Yes	No	No		
2011	Segunda Mano	No	No	No	Yes		
2013	Ekstra	No	Yes	No	No		
2013	Bakit Hindi Ka Crush ng Crush Mo?	No	No	No	Yes		
2014	Da Possessed	No	Yes	No	No	Also 2nd assistant director	
2014	Beauty in a Bottle	Yes	Yes	No	No		
2014	Ang Nanay Kong Noisy	Yes	Yes	No	No	Short film	
2014	That Thing Called Tadhana	Yes	Yes	No	No		
2014	Relaks, It's Just Pag-ibig	Yes	Yes	No	No		
2014	English Only, Please	No	Yes	No	No		
2015	You're My Boss	Yes	Yes	No	No		
2015	The Breakup Playlist	No	Yes	No	No		
2015	All You Need Is Pag-ibig	Yes	Yes	No	No		
2015	#WalangForever	No	Story	Creative	No	Also additional script	
2016	The Achy Breaky Hearts	Yes	Yes	No	No		
2017	Love You to the Stars and Back	Yes	Yes	No	No		
2017	Changing Partners	No	No	Yes	No		
2018	Never Not Love You	Yes	Yes	Yes	No		
2018	Hintayan ng Langit	No	No	Yes	No		
2019	Alone/Together	Yes	Yes	Yes	No		
2020	Fan Girl	Yes	Yes	Executive	No		
2021	Mang Jose	No	No	Yes	No		
2023	Iti Mapukpukaw	No	No	Executive	No		
2024	Kono Basho	No	No	Executive	No		
2024	Sunshine	Yes	Yes	Executive	No		
2024	Diamonds in the Sand	No	No	Executive	No		
2024	Uninvited	No	No	Yes	No		
2025	Ex Ex Lovers	No	Yes	Yes	Yes	Also executive producer	
TBA	Boldstar	Yes	Yes		No	In development since 2016	
TBA	Amateur	No	No	Yes	No		

=== Television ===
Year	Title	Role	Notes
2015	On the Wings of Love	Director	
2016	Till I Met You	Director	
2018	Since I Found You	Director	
2021	The Kangks Show	Director	
2023	Simula sa Gitna	Director	
2025	Afam Wives Club	Producer	
TBA	Hello, Haven	Director	

== Accolades ==
=== Film awards ===
Awards and nominations received by Antoinette Jadaone
Awards and Nominations
Organization	Year	Nominated Work	Category	Result	Ref.
Asia Pacific Screen Awards	2024	Best Youth Film (shared with Dan Villegas, Geoderic Lomuntad, Bianca Balbuena)	Sunshine	Nominated	
Berlin International Film Festival	2025	Generation 14plus - Best Film (Crystal Bear)	Sunshine	Won	
Cinemalaya Independent Film Festival	2013	Best Screenplay (shared with Zig Madamba Dulay and Jeffrey Jeturian)	Ekstra	Won	
Cinemanila International Film Festival	2008	Best Short Film (Young Cinema Competition)	Tumbang Preso	Won	
Cinemanila International Film Festival	2009	Best Short Film (Young Cinema Competition)	Ito Ang Gabing Babalikan Kita Pagkatapos ng Tatlong Taon Nang Hindi na Maiiyak at Masasaktan	Nominated	
Cinema One Originals Digital Film Festival	2011	Audience Award	Six Degrees of Separation from Lilia Cuntapay	Won	
Cinema One Originals Digital Film Festival	2011	Best Screenplay	Six Degrees of Separation from Lilia Cuntapay	Won	
Cinema One Originals Digital Film Festival	2011	Best Picture	Six Degrees of Separation from Lilia Cuntapay	Nominated	
Cinema One Originals Digital Film Festival	2011	Special Jury Prize	Six Degrees of Separation from Lilia Cuntapay	Won	
Cinema One Originals Digital Film Festival	2014	Biogesic Short Film Award	Ang Nanay Kong Noisy	Won	
Cinema One Originals Digital Film Festival	2014	Champion Bughaw Award	That Thing Called Tadhana	Won	
Cinema One Originals Digital Film Festival	2014	Audience Award	That Thing Called Tadhana	Won	
Cinema One Originals Digital Film Festival	2014	Best Picture	That Thing Called Tadhana	Nominated	
FAMAS Awards	2014	Best Story (shared with Zig Madamba Dulay and Jeffrey Jeturian)	Ekstra	Nominated	
FAMAS Awards	2014	Best Screenplay (shared with Zig Madamba Dulay and Jeffrey Jeturian)	Ekstra	Nominated	
FAMAS Awards	2016	Best Story (shared with Yoshke Dimen)	You're My Boss	Nominated	
FAMAS Awards	2016	Best Screenplay (shared with Yoshke Dimen)	You're My Boss	Nominated	
FAMAS Awards	2016	Best Director	You're My Boss	Nominated	
FAMAS Awards	2018	Best Original Screenplay	Love You to the Stars and Back	Nominated	
FAMAS Awards	2018	Outstanding Achievement in Directing	Love You to the Stars and Back	Nominated	
FAMAS Awards	2021	Best Screenplay	Fan Girl	Nominated	
FAMAS Awards	2021	Best Director	Fan Girl	Nominated	
Gawad Urian Awards	2012	Best Screenplay (Pinakamahusay na Dulang Pampelikula)	Six Degrees of Separation from Lilia Cuntapay	Nominated	
Gawad Urian Awards	2012	Best Direction (Pinakamahusay na Direksyon)	Six Degrees of Separation from Lilia Cuntapay	Nominated	
Gawad Urian Awards	2015	Best Screenplay (Pinakamahusay na Dulang Pampelikula)	That Thing Called Tadhana	Nominated	
Gawad Urian Awards	2021	Best Direction (Pinakamahusay na Direksyon)	Fan Girl	Nominated	
Guam International Film Festival	2015	Best Narrative Feature	That Thing Called Tadhana	Won	
Luna Awards	2016	Best Screenplay	The Breakup Playlist	Nominated	
Luna Awards	2016	Best Screenplay	That Thing Called Tadhana	Nominated	
Luna Awards	2016	Best Director	That Thing Called Tadhana	Nominated	
Luna Awards	2018	Best Director	Love You to the Stars and Back	Nominated	
Metro Manila Film Festival	2014	Best Screenplay (shared with Anjeli Pessumal)	English Only, Please	Won	
Metro Manila Film Festival	2014	Best Original Story (shared with Dan Villegas)	English Only, Please	Won	
Metro Manila Film Festival	2015	Best Original Story (shared with Dan Villegas)	#WalangForever	Won	
Metro Manila Film Festival	2015	Best Director	All You Need Is Pag-Ibig	Nominated	
Metro Manila Film Festival	2020	Best Screenplay	Fan Girl	Won	
Metro Manila Film Festival	2020	Best Director	Fan Girl	Won	
Osaka International Film Festival	2015	Grand Prix	That Thing Called Tadhana	Nominated	
PMPC Star Awards for Movies	2014	Indie Movie Screenwriter of the Year (shared with Zig Madamba Dulay and Jeffrey Jeturian)	Ekstra	Nominated	
PMPC Star Awards for Movies	2015	Movie Screenwriter of the Year	Beauty in a Bottle	Nominated	
PMPC Star Awards for Movies	2015	Movie Screenwriter of the Year	English Only, Please	Nominated	
PMPC Star Awards for Movies	2015	Indie Movie Screenwriter of the Year	That Thing Called Tadhana	Nominated	
PMPC Star Awards for Movies	2018	Movie Director of the Year	Love You to the Stars and Back	Nominated	
PMPC Star Awards for Movies	2018	Movie Screenwriter of the Year	Love You to the Stars and Back	Nominated	
PMPC Star Awards for Movies	2022	Movie Director of the Year	Fan Girl	Nominated	
PMPC Star Awards for Movies	2022	Movie Screenwriter of the Year	Fan Girl	Nominated	
Tallinn Black Nights Film Festival	2020	Best Film Grand Prize	Fan Girl	Nominated	
The EDDYS	2021	Best Screenplay	Fan Girl	Won	
The EDDYS	2021	Best Director	Fan Girl	Won	
VP Choice Awards	2020	Movie Director of the Year	Fan Girl	Won	

=== Honors and state recognition ===
Awards and nominations received by Antoinette Jadaone
Organization	Year	Nominee/Work	Category	Result	Ref.
Film Development Council of the Philippines	2025	—N/a	Special Citation	Honored	
National Commission for Culture and the Arts	2016	—N/a	Ani ng Dangal — Cinema	Honored	
