= Coming Home (2020 film) =

- Official release poster
- Directed by: Adolfo Alix Jr.
- Written by: Gina Marissa Tagasa
- Starring: Jinggoy Estrada; Sylvia Sanchez; Martin del Rosario; Edgar Allan Guzman; Vin Abrenica; Shaira Diaz; Jake Ejercito; Julian Estrada; Ariella Arida
- Cinematography: Gabriel Bagnas
- Edited by: Adolfo Alix Jr.; Roseanne Gatcheco
- Music by: Vincent Chu
- Production companies: Maverick Films; ALV Films
- Distributed by: Maverick Films
- Release date: December 25, 2020
- Country: Philippines
- Language: Filipino

Coming Home is a 2020 Philippine drama film co-edited and directed by Adolfo Alix Jr. The film stars Jinggoy Estrada, Sylvia Sanchez, Ariella Arida, Edgar Allan Guzman, Jake Ejercito, Martin del Rosario, Shaira Diaz, Vin Abrenica and Julian Estrada. It is one of the entries in the 2020 Metro Manila Film Festival.

== Premise ==
Benny Librada (Jinggoy Estrada) works in Qatar, as a means of livelihood for his family back in the Philippines. Caught in a vulnerable situation, he falls for Mercy Dungca (Ariella Arida) who works as a nurse in the Gulf country with Dungca becoming Benny's "reluctant mistress". Back in the Philippines, the Librada matriarch, Salve (Sylvia Sanchez) aims to keep her family together while concealing that she has terminal illness.

== Cast ==
- Jinggoy Estrada as Benny Librada
- Sylvia Sanchez as Salve Librada
- Ariella Arida as Mercy Dungca
- Edgar Allan Guzman as Neb Librada
- Jake Ejercito as Enji Librada
- Martin del Rosario as Yuri Librada
- Shaira Diaz as Sally Librada
- Vin Abrenica as SJ Librada
- Julian Estrada as Berns Librada
- Jana Agoncillo as Becy
- Smokey Manaloto as Itok
- Samantha Lopez as Osang
- Almira Muhlach as Fely
- Luis Hontiveros as Jonas
- Geneva Cruz as Ellen
- Chanel Morales as Liz
- Alvin Anson as Lloyd
- Gigi Locsin as Doctor

== Production ==
Coming Home was produced under Maverick Films with Adolfo Alix Jr. as its director. Alix came up with the initial concept story for Coming Home while Gina Marissa Tagasa was responsible for the film's screenplay. The film's plot is reportedly partially inspired from true-to-life events.

== Release ==
Coming Home was initially part of the 2020 Metro Manila Summer Film Festival, which was supposed to take place from April 11 – 21 of that year. However, the festival was cancelled due to the COVID-19 pandemic. It was finally released online through Upstream on December 25, 2020 as an official entry to the 2020 Metro Manila Film Festival.
