= Miles Ocampo =

Filipino actress, model and singer (born 1997)

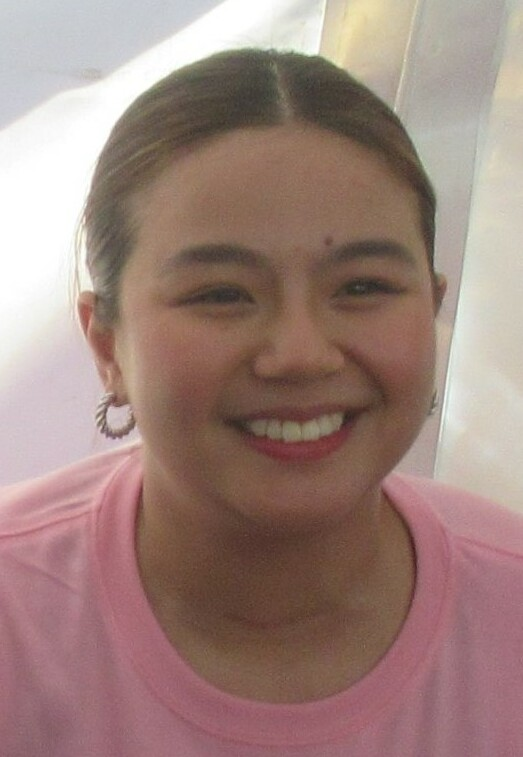
- Ocampo in 2023
- Born: Camille Tan Hojilla; May 1, 1997 (age 29); Quezon City, Metro Manila, Philippines
- Education: School of St. Anthony
- Occupations: Actress; commercial model; television host; writer
- Years active: 2004–present
- Agents: Star Magic (2004–2022); Crown Artist Management (2022–2025); All Access to Artists (2025–present)
- Known for: Goin' Bulilit

Camille Tan Hojilla (born May 1, 1997), known professionally as Miles Ocampo, is a Filipino actress, commercial model, television host and writer. In 2022, she left ABS-CBN's Star Magic to join Crown Artist Management, a talent agency run by Maja Salvador with her husband, Rambo Nunez-Ortega, and the following year, she won her first acting award at the 2023 Metro Manila Film Festival for the movie Family of Two. She is one of the hosts for the longest-running noontime show, Eat Bulaga!, known for her wordplay jokes. On April 22, 2025, it was announced that Miles is now under the management of All Access to Artists.

== Career ==
Ocampo first appeared in television via Bibbo Hotdog commercial. She then joined Magandang Tanghali Bayan, a noontime variety show, performing on Mondays and Saturdays. Thereafter she appeared in the drama series Mangarap Ka which starred Piolo Pascual and Angelica Panganiban. After appearing in a couple of Maalaala Mo Kaya episodes, Miles joined the kiddie comedy show Goin' Bulilit in 2005 as one of its original cast. She auditioned for the show at age 7, imitating her mom scolding her.

She also starred in Mga Anghel Na Walang Langit and a number of Maalaala Mo Kaya episodes. When she graduated from Goin' Bulilit, she became part of the teen show Luv U.

She is best known for her portrayal as Camille Sarmiento in youth-oriented TV comedy show, Luv U from February 2012 to January 2016 and Gigi in the sitcom Home Sweetie Home from 2014 to 2020. She also starred in several primetime series including Kailangan Ko'y Ikaw as Precious in 2013, And I Love You So as Joanna in 2015–2016, Sana Dalawa ang Puso as Tinay in 2018. In February 2023, she was widely praised for her performance as the young Marites Dimaguiba in FPJ's Batang Quiapo.

She supported in several Star Cinema films including I've Fallen for You (as Kim Chiu's sister), A Very Special Love, You Changed My Life, BFF: Best Friends Forever, and Paano na Kaya, a film By Kim Chiu and Gerald Anderson via Star Cinema.

She appeared in the movies One Great Love, Write About Love and The Missing.

In 2019, she bagged her first leading role in a movie in the 2019 Metro Manila Film Festival entry, Write About Love. She was a shoo-in for the role, not being required to audition as the director of the movie, Crisanto Aquino, deemed her to be the only choice for the role.

Ocampo appeared on the long-running noontime show Eat Bulaga! on March 30, 2022, as the newest Dabarkads host. After her almost 1-year stint in Eat Bulaga!, Ocampo took a short break in March 2023 from the show after undergoing surgery after discovering she had papillary thyroid carcinoma. She made a short return to the show around April 2023, before leaving the show without any announcement.

On July 7, 2023, she joined the TV5's noontime show, E.A.T. under TVJ Productions.

She was awarded Best Supporting Actress in the 2023 Metro Manila Film Festival for her role as Zari in the movie Family of Two.

== Personal life ==
Ocampo attended the University of the Philippines, studying creative writing. She finished elementary and high school at School of St. Anthony.

Ocampo underwent surgery in March 2023 to remove her thyroid glands after she was diagnosed with papillary thyroid carcinoma.

Ocampo was in a relationship with actor Elijah Canlas from 2022 to 2026.

== Filmography ==
=== Social media ===
Year	Title	Role	Notes	Ref.
2020–2021	Ambagets	Host	Kumu	

=== Television ===
Year	Title	Role	Notes	Ref.
2004	Mangarap Ka	Pepe / Pepay		
2004	Maalaala Mo Kaya	young Sandara	Episode: "Scrapbook"	
2004	Maalaala Mo Kaya	young Miriam	Episode: "Puno"	
2004	Spirits	Gracie		
2004–2005	Krystala	Balding		
2005–2006	Mga Anghel na Walang Langit	Pepay		
2005–2009	Goin' Bulilit	Herself (various roles)	Graduate (Batch 6)	
2006–2007	Kids TV	Herself		
2006	Calla Lily	Laning		
2006	Maalaala Mo Kaya	Nikka	Episode: "Gitara"	
2006	Komiks	Mika	Episode: "Sandok Ni Boninay"	
2007	Maalaala Mo Kaya	Kail		
2007	Maalaala Mo Kaya	young Flor	Episode: "Barya"	
2007	Maalaala Mo Kaya	Bella	Episode: "Bag"	
2007	Maalaala Mo Kaya	Karyl	Episode: "Patalim"	
2007	Maalaala Mo Kaya	Angie	Episode: "Sulat"	
2007	Maalaala Mo Kaya	young Angel	Episode: "Singsing"	
2008	Maalaala Mo Kaya	Julia	Episode: "Billboard"	
2008	Aalog-Alog	Guest		
2009	Maalaala Mo Kaya	Rhia Mae	Episode: "Relo"	
2010	Maalaala Mo Kaya	Joy	Episode: "Shell"	
2010	Maalaala Mo Kaya	Era	Episode: "Manika"	
2010	Shout Out!	Herself		
2011	Maalaala Mo Kaya	Mary Jane	Episode: "Wheelchair"	
2011	Wansapanataym		Episode: "Aurora's Oras"	
2011	Wansapanataym		Episode: "Wallet"	
2011	Maria la del Barrio	Sunshine Cayanan		
2012–2016	Luv U	Camille Sarmiento		
2012	Maalaala Mo Kaya	Princess Chavez	Episode: "Kalendaryo"	
2012	Wansapanataym		Episode: "Lai, Lai, Batang Pasaway"	
2013	Kailangan Ko'y Ikaw	Precious Dagohoy		
2013	Maalaala Mo Kaya	young Rene	Episode: "Walis"	
2013	Banana Sundae	Herself	"Ihaw Na!" segment	
2014	Wansapanataym	Krystal	Episode: Witch-a-Makulit	
2014–2020	Home Sweetie Home	Gigi Alcantara		
2015–2021 2026–present	ASAP	Herself		
2015	Maalaala Mo Kaya	Thelma	Episode: “Sister Bond”	
2015	Maalaala Mo Kaya	Che	Episode: "Stars"	
2015	Maalaala Mo Kaya	Emma	Episode: "Banana Split"	
2015–2016	And I Love You So	Joanna R. Valdez		
2016	Maalaala Mo Kaya	Nelia	Episode: "Popcorn"	
2016	Maalaala Mo Kaya	young Miriam Santiago	Episode: "#MMKSenatorMiriam"	
2016	Ipaglaban Mo!	Sheryl	Episode: Kasambahay	
2017	Maalaala Mo Kaya	Bernadette	Episode: "Bahay"	
2018	Sana Dalawa ang Puso	Tinay Tabayoyong		
2018	Ipaglaban Mo!	Rina	Episode: "Hayok"	
2019	Tonight with Boy Abunda	Herself		
2019	Minute to Win It	Herself	competed with Sharlene San Pedro	
2019	Ipaglaban Mo!	Maricel	Episode: "Disiplina"	
2019	Goin' Bulilit	Sister Mia		
2019	TV Patrol	Herself as Guest Star Patroller		
2020	Maalaala Mo Kaya	Bernadeth	Episode: "Lifted by Love"	
2020	Paano Kita Mapasasalamatan?	Helen	Episode 2	
2020–2021	Sunday 'Kada	Herself (various roles)		
2020–2021	Paano ang Pasko?	love		
2021	Paano ang Pangako?	Sabel		
2021	Niña Niño	Honey		
2021	Love vs. Stars	Luna		
2021	Maalaala Mo Kaya	Sarah	Episode: "Scarf"	
2021–2022	Happy ToGetHer	Liz Rodriguez	also a writer; credited as Camille Hojilla	
2022–present	Eat Bulaga!	Herself (co-host)	came back to the program's interim title E.A.T. until January 5, 2024	
2023	FPJ's Batang Quiapo	young Marites		
2023	Magandang Buhay	Herself (guest)		
2023	The Iron Heart	Karen		
2023–2024	E.A.T...	Herself / (co-host)		
2023–2024	Emojination	Herself (co-host)		
2024	EB Lenten Special: Para Di Makalimot	Alexis		
2024	Padyak Princess	Princess Nieva		
2025	EB Lenten Special: Paano Ba Magpatawad	Marjean / MJ		

=== Film ===
Year	Title	Role	Notes	Ref.
2004	Lastikman: Unang Banat	young Lara		
2006	First Day High	young Precious Princess Jewel Pré Samartino		
2007	Sakal, Sakali, Saklolo	Jane		
2008	A Very Special Love	Rose Magtalas		
2009	BFF: Best Friends Forever	Katkat		
2009	I've Fallen for You	Angel		
2009	You Changed My Life	Rose Magtalas		
2010	Till My Heartaches End	young Agnes Garcia		
2010	Sa 'yo Lamang	Lisa Alvero		
2010	Paano na Kaya	Kristine		
2011	Wedding Tayo, Wedding Hindi	Karen Matias		
2012	24/7 in Love	Jamie		
2013	Pagpag: Siyam na Buhay	Ashley	2013 Metro Manila Film Festival entry	
2013	It Takes a Man and a Woman	Rose Magtalas		
2015	Halik sa Hangin	Camille		
2016	The Achy Breaky Hearts	Jenny Villanueva		
2016	Padre de Familia	Tana Santiago		
2017	The Debutantes	Lara		
2018	My Fairy Tail Love Story	Anna		
2018	One Great Love	Jemy Paez		
2018	Maledicto	Agnes		
2019	Click, Like & Share: Bluer than Bleu	Bleu		
2019	Write About Love	Female Writer	2019 Metro Manila Film Festival entry	
2020	The Missing	Len	2020 Metro Manila Film Festival entry	
2023	Here Comes the Groom	Yumi	1st Summer Metro Manila Film Festival entry	
2023	Papa Mascot	Iris		
2023	Missed Connections	Mae		
2023	Family of Two	Zari	2023 Metro Manila Film Festival entry	

=== Music videos ===
Year	Title	Artist	Ref.
2025	Multo	Cup of Joe	

== Awards and nominations ==
Name of the award ceremony, year presented, category, nominee of the award, and the result of the nomination
Award ceremony	Year	Category	Nominee / Work	Result	Ref.
Goin' Bulilit Awards	2019	Bulol Ako Lifetime Achievement Award	Miles Ocampo	Won	
Metro Manila Film Festival	2018	Best Supporting Actress	One Great Love	Nominated	
Metro Manila Film Festival	2019	Best Actress	Write About Love	Nominated	
Metro Manila Film Festival	2020	Best Supporting Actress	The Missing	Nominated	
Metro Manila Film Festival	2023	Best Supporting Actress	Family of Two	Won	
Push Awards	2018	Push Celebrity Squad of the Year #FriendshipGoals	Miles Ocampo (shared with Sharlene San Pedro)	Nominated	
