= Charlie Dizon =

Filipino actress (born 1996)

- Born: April Rose Dizon Matienzo-Aquino; April 12, 1996 (age 30); Agoncillo, Batangas, Philippines
- Other name: April Matienzo
- Occupation: Actress
- Years active: 2017–present
- Agents: Star Magic (2018–present); Rise Artists Studio (2020–2023)
- Known for: Rica in Viral Scandal
- Spouse: Carlo Aquino (m. 2024)

April Rose "Charlie" Dizon Matienzo-Aquino (born April 12, 1996) is a Filipino actress. Her acting breakthrough came in the 2020 Metro Manila Film Festival entry Fan Girl. Her accolades include a Gawad Urian Award, a Metro Manila Film Festival Award, a Star Award and two EDDYS Awards.

== Early life and education ==
April Rose Dizon Matienzo was born on April 12, 1996 in Agoncillo, Batangas. She is the youngest of four sisters in her family. Initially, her family valued academics over show business, expecting her to focus on traditional studies. She attended the University of Santo Tomas (UST) where she was a second-year nursing student.

== Career ==
Dizon made her acting debut in 2017 in the film Finally Found Someone, it was followed by appearances, in the same year, in the films Loving in Tandem, and Seven Sundays.

In 2018, Dizon appeared in the film Sin Island. Prior to her appearance in the said film, she was credited using her real name and was not formally introduced using her stage name until a month later. In March, Dizon was one of the thirteen aspiring actors introduced by Star Magic dubbed the 2018 Star Magic Circle and would make her television debut in Bagani.

A year later, Dizon appeared in the fantasy-drama series Parasite Island.

In 2020, Dizon appeared in the television series A Soldier's Heart and in the films Four Sisters Before the Wedding and Fan Girl. Dizon's portrayal of the titular character earned her the Best Actress Award in the Metro Manila Film Festival and The EDDYS in 2021.

She appeared in the television series My Sunset Girl and Viral Scandal in 2021.

In 2023, she starred in the romance film Third World Romance where she won the Best Actress award in Gawad Urian and The EDDYS in 2024.

== Personal life ==
Dizon married actor Carlo Aquino in a private ceremony in Silang, Cavite on June 9, 2024. They worked together in the 2023 film Third World Romance.

== Filmography ==
=== Film ===
Year	Title	Role	Ref.
2017	Finally Found Someone	Trina	
2017	Loving in Tandem	Snatcher	
2017	Seven Sundays	Camille	
2018	Sin Island	Cielo	
2019	Pandanggo sa Hukay	Tisay	
2020	Four Sisters Before the Wedding	Teddie Salazar	
2020	Fan Girl	Jane	
2023	Third World Romance	Britney	
2024	Moneyslapper		
2025	Near Death	Julia	
2025	Rekonek	Kate	
TBA	Ang Ina Mo †	Donna	

=== Television ===
Year	Title	Role	Ref.
2018	Bagani	Marikit / Halina	
2018	Ipaglaban Mo: Kakampi	Sandra	
2019	Touch Screen	Nini	
2019	Maalaala Mo Kaya: Choir	Apple	
2019	Parasite Island	Princess Salvacion	
2020	A Soldier's Heart	Isabel Gezali	
2021	Maalaala Mo Kaya: Planner	Jobelle Fernandez	
2021	My Sunset Girl	Ciara	
2021–22	Viral Scandal	Rica "Ikay" Meneses-Sicat	
2022	Maalaala Mo Kaya: Singsing	Raquel Panganiban	
2022	Maalaala Mo Kaya: Lumpiang Shanghai	Joan Ronduen	
2023	Mga Kuwento ng Dilim	Host	
2023–2024	Pira-Pirasong Paraiso	Diana B. Paraiso-Lamadrid	
2025	It's Okay to Not Be Okay	Jana	
2025–26	What Lies Beneath	Elizabeth "Beth" Sevilla-Mora	
2026	The Loyalty Game	Regina "Ging Ging" Santos	
2026	Balaraw †	Bulak Bernabe	
TBA	The Bagman †		

== Awards and nominations ==
Awards and nominations received by Charlie Dizon
Award (Note: Awards, festivals, honors and other miscellaneous organizations are listed in alphabetical order.)	Year (Note: Indicates the year of ceremony. Each year is linked to the article about the awards held that year, wherever possible.)	Category	Nominated work	Result	Ref.
FAMAS Awards	2021	Best Actress	Fan Girl	Nominated	
FAMAS Awards	2024	Best Actress	Third World Romance	Nominated	
Gawad Urian Awards	2021	Best Actress	Fan Girl	Nominated	
Gawad Urian Awards	2024	Best Actress	Third World Romance	Won	
Metro Manila Film Festival	2020	Best Actress	Fan Girl	Won	
PMPC Star Awards for Movies	2023	Movie Actress of the Year	Fan Girl	Nominated	
PMPC Star Awards for Movies	2023	New Movie Actress of the Year	Fan Girl	Won	
PMPC Star Awards for Television	2018	Best New Female TV Personality	Bagani	Nominated	
The EDDYS	2021	Best Actress	Fan Girl	Won	
The EDDYS	2024	Best Actress	Third World Romance	Won	
VP Choice Awards	2021	TV Actress of the Year	Viral Scandal	Won	

== See also ==
- List of Filipino actresses
- Cinema of the Philippines
- Television in the Philippines
