= Joseph Marco =

Filipino actor and model

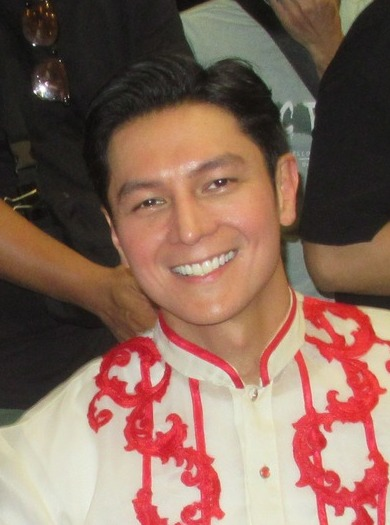
- Marco in 2023
- Born: Joseph Cecil Marco; Binangonan, Rizal, Philippines
- Other names: Joey, Oatz, Chekoh, JoMar
- Occupations: Actor; model; singer; endorser
- Years active: 2007–present
- Agents: Sparkle (2007–2009); Star Magic (2010–2025); KP&PR&EMS, Inc. (2007-present); Viva Artists Agency (2025–present)
- Height: 1.73 m (5 ft 8 in)
- Partner(s): Celeste Cortesi (2019–2020); Dasha Romanova (2020–2023)
- Musical career
- Genres: Pop; OPM
- Instrument: Vocals
- Years active: 2015–2018
- Label: Star Music (2015–2018)
- Website: Marco on Instagram

Joseph Cecil Marco is a Filipino actor and model who played the role of Santi Domingo in the GMA Network Philippine drama series La Vendetta. Under ABS-CBN's Star Magic from 2010 to 2025, he appeared in Sabel, Honesto, Pasión de Amor and played Diego Torillo in Wildflower. Before this, he used to appear on several commercials like E-Aji Dip Snax, Downy and Head & Shoulders. On September 15, 2007, he was launched as part of the 15 new discoveries of GMA Artist Center, and was one of the first few who was quickly given a project via La Vendetta. He is currently a Viva Artists Agency talent.

== Early life and background ==
Joseph Cecil Marco is the fourth of eight children, which include an elder sister residing in California, two elder brothers, and four younger sisters. Marco graduated high school in 2005 from Faith Christian School in Cainta, Rizal, and did not finish college after he was discovered by his manager in Eastwood City. He said during the initial presscon of La Vendetta: "Nagulat nga po ako na first VTR ko, nakapasa agad ako." ("I was surprised that I got approved on my first VTR.")

== Acting career ==
=== 2007–2009 ===
After his first commercial, he came up more TV commercials with products such as Coca-Cola, E-Aji Dip Snax and Downy.

Marco signed up with GMA Artist Center in September 2007. He was one of the first of his batch to have been given a TV project when he was added to the cast of the then airing TV drama series, La Vendetta. Here, he played the role of a geek teenager Santi Domingo. At the initial phase of their presentation as new artists, Marco was able to guest at different programmes on GMA such as Showbiz Central, SOP Rules and Nuts Entertainment.

In 2007, he was included in Philippines' Cosmopolitan magazine's 2007 69 Bachelors but did not join the fashion show held at The Fort. For the fantasy TV drama, Dyesebel, he played an assistant named Joseph

=== 2010–2014 ===
In 2010, Marco transferred network to ABS-CBN under its talent agency Star Magic. Marco was picked to be one of the lead cast in ABS-CBN's show Sabel as Raymond Sandoval, with Jessy Mendiola and AJ Perez. Marco also appeared in some episodes of the anthology, Maalaala Mo Kaya.

In 2014, he played the main role of Dave Martinez in the afternoon TV series entitled Pure Love, alongside Alex Gonzaga and Yen Santos.

=== 2015–present ===
In March 2015, ASAP launched his newest boy group called "Harana" together with his co-members, Marlo Mortel, Bryan Santos and Michael Pangilinan with their carrier single, "Number One". He was one of the main cast of the primetime series Pasión de Amor, a Philippine remake of Pasión de Gavilanes, that aired in June 2015.

In 2016, Marco joined the cast of Dolce Amore. He played the role of River Cruz and became the new rival of Tenten to Serena's heart.

In 2017, he was cast as one of the leading men in the ABS-CBN teleserye, Wildflower. Marco played the role of Diego Ardiente Torillo, whose parents caused the death of Ivy's – the female lead – parents. His character later challenged Ivy's plans, of which falling in love was not included.

In 2019, after taking a 10-month hiatus from teleseryes, he joined the cast of Los Bastardos, another ABS-CBN teleserye. Joseph played the lead role of Lorenzo Cardinal, one of the sons of Don Roman Cardinal.

In 2020, he portrayed the role of Christian Salvador in The Bridge and Avel Mansueto in Ang sa Iyo ay Akin.

== Personal life ==
Marco previously dated actress Kazel Kinouchi, and beauty pageant contestant and model Celeste Cortesi. His last relationship was with Russian model Dasha Rokanova.

== Acting credits ==
=== Film ===
Key
†	Denotes films that have not yet been released

Joseph Marco's film credits with year of release, film titles and roles
Year	Title	Role	Ref.
2012	The Reunion	Jeric	
2012	24/7 in Love	Gabriel	
2013	A Moment in Time	Morie	
2013	Saturday Night Chills	Jeff	
2013	Saka Saka	Abner Abueg	
2013	On the Job	Ruel	
2014	Talk Back and You're Dead	Jared "Red" Dela Cruz	
2016	My Rebound Girl	Rich	
2017	Pwera Usog	Sherwin	
2017	Dear Other Self	Chris	
2017	Triptiko	Jason	
2020	The Missing	Job	
2020	Isa Pang Bahaghari	Peter Anthony Sanchez	
2022	Apag	Marco	

=== Television ===
Key
†	Denotes shows that have not yet been aired

Joseph Marco's television credits with year of release, title(s) and role
Year	Title	Role	Ref.
2007	La Vendetta	Santi Domingo	
2008	Mars Ravelo's Dyesebel	Joseph	
2010	Sabel	Raymond Sandoval	
2011	Mara Clara	—N/a	
2011	Wansapanataym: Flores De Mayumi	Luis	
2011	Maalaala Mo Kaya: Bisikleta	Bert Sanchez	
2011	Maalaala Mo Kaya: Langis	Abel	
2012	E-Boy	Teen Miguel Villareal	
2012	Wansapanataym: Dollhouse	Driver / Doll	
2012	Maalaala Mo Kaya: Motorsiklo	Ponso	
2012	Precious Hearts Romances Presents: Pintada	Julian Sandejas	
2012	Princess and I	Dasho Kim Methra	
2012	Maalaala Mo Kaya: Police Uniform	Jason	
2013	Maalaala Mo Kaya: Kulungan	Roy	
2013	Huwag Ka Lang Mawawala	Leandros Panaligan	
2013	Wansapanataym: My Fairy Kasambahay	Eric Santa Maria	
2013	Honesto	Elijah "Elai" Galang	
2014	Pure Love	Dave Martinez	
2015	Nasaan Ka Nang Kailangan Kita	Teen Nicanor "Kanor" Galvez	
2015	Pasión de Amor	Franco Samonte/Reyes	
2016	Ipaglaban Mo!: Tiwala	Tonyo	
2016	Maalaala Mo Kaya: Puno ng Mangga	Jeremiah	
2016	Dolce Amore	River Cruz	
2017	Wildflower	Diego Torillo	
2018	Precious Hearts Romances Presents: Los Bastardos	Lorenzo "Enzo" Cuevas / Lorenzo de Jesus-Cardinal	
2019	Maalaala Mo Kaya: Steak	Bong Go	
2019	Maalaala Mo Kaya: Mikropono	young Zacharias "Ga" Bayawa	
2019	Touch Screen	Justin	
2019	Uncoupling	Carlo	
2020	The Bridge	Christian	
2020	Ang sa Iyo ay Akin	Avelino "Avel" Mansueto Jr.	
2021	FPJ's Ang Probinsyano	Lucas Catapang	
2023	Pira-Pirasong Paraiso	Vladimir "Vlad" Sebastian-Lamadrid	
2025	FPJ's Batang Quiapo	Young Alfredo Pangan	
2025	I Love You Since 1892	Leandro Flores	
2026	My Husband is a Mafia Boss	Ezekiel "Zeke" Roswell	

== Discography ==
- Harana (2015)

== Accolades ==
Year	Award	Category	Notable Work	Result	Ref.
2013	9th Cinema One Originals Film Festival	Best Actor – Cinema One Currents (with Rayver Cruz and Matteo Guidicelli)	Saturday Night Chills	Won	
2017	48th GMMSF Box-Office Entertainment Awards	Most Promising TV Actor of the Year	Pasión de Amor	Won	
2017	31st PMPC Star Awards for Television	Best Drama Supporting Actor	Wildflower	Nominated	
