= Tagpuan =

- Official Poster with original Summer MMFF logo
- Directed by: MacArthur Alejandre
- Written by: Ricky Lee
- Produced by: Alfred Vargas
- Starring: Alfred Vargas; Iza Calzado; Shaina Magdayao
- Production company: Alternative Vision Cinemas
- Distributed by: Regal Entertainment
- Release date: December 25, 2020
- Country: Philippines
- Language: Filipino

Tagpuan (transl. Meeting Place) is a 2020 Philippine romantic drama film directed by MacArthur Alejandre and starring Alfred Vargas, Iza Calzado, and Shaina Magdayao. It is an official entry to the 2020 Metro Manila Film Festival and is produced under Alternative Vision Cinemas.

== Premise ==
An ex-couple (Alfred Vargas and Iza Calzado) meets and reconcile with each other in New York City after being separated for five years. Vargas' character also links up with another woman (Shaina Magdayao) while on a business trip in Hong Kong.

== Production ==
Tagpuan was produced under Alternative Vision Cinemas with MacArthur Alejandre as its director. Alternative Vision Cinemas is envisioned to produce films which serves as an "alternative" to its mainstream counterparts. The film was written by Ricky Lee and its main producer is Alfred Vargas who is also the lead actor in the film. It is the third film produced under the production studio, with the first two being Supremo (2012) and Kaputol (2019).

Filming for Tagpuan began sometime in 2019. Depicting the lives of Overseas Filipino Workers and Filipino immigrants, filming for the film took place in Hong Kong and New York City prior to the COVID-19 pandemic. Select scenes were also shot in Binondo, Manila.

Principal photography in New York took two weeks to complete. The production team decided not to shoot scenes in typical tourist attractions in New York such as the Empire State Building and the Statue of Liberty. Scenes were filmed Manhattan, Brooklyn, and the city's Chinatown. In Hong Kong, filming was done amidst protests, although work on the film was completed without any significant problems.

== Release ==
The film was then included as one of the ten official entries of the 2020 Metro Manila Film Festival and will be made available online through Upstream starting December 25, 2020. Tagpuan also marks the return of lead actor Alfred Vargas in the MMFF, whose last film in the film festival was Bridal Shower in 2003.

The film was submitted for the 2019 Metro Manila Film Festival but was not selected as one of the eight official entries for that edition of the film festival. Tagpuan was also an entry to the 2020 Metro Manila Summer Film Festival which was supposed to be held in April 2020 but was cancelled due to the COVID-19 pandemic.
