= Fan Girl (2020 film) =

2020 coming of age film

- Official release poster
- Directed by: Antoinette Jadaone
- Written by: Antoinette Jadaone
- Produced by: Bianca Balbuena; Dan Villegas
- Starring: Charlie Dizon; Paulo Avelino
- Cinematography: Neil Daza
- Edited by: Benjamin Tolentino
- Music by: Teresa Barrozo
- Production companies: Black Sheep Productions; Globe Studios; Project 8 Corner San Joaquin Projects; Epic Media; Crossword Productions
- Release dates: October 31, 2020 (Tokyo International Film Festival); December 25, 2020 (Philippines)
- Running time: 100 minutes
- Country: Philippines
- Language: Filipino

Fan Girl is a 2020 Philippine coming of age film starring Charlie Dizon and Paulo Avelino. It is written and directed by Antoinette Jadaone.

== Premise ==
The story revolves around Jane, an obsessed teenage girl (Charlie Dizon) who spent an unforgettable night with her idol, Paulo Avelino (as a fictional version of himself).

== Cast ==
- Paulo Avelino as a fictional version of himself
- Charlie Dizon as Jane
- Bea Alonzo as herself

== Release ==
Fan Girl first premiered in Japan at the 33rd Tokyo International Film Festival. The film was also the sole Filipino film selected for the main competition of the 24th Tallinn Black Nights Film Festival held in Estonia.

Fan Girl was released to a wider audience on December 25, 2020, as one of the official entries of the Philippine-based 2020 Metro Manila Film Festival. As part of the film festival which was modified as a digital event due to COVID-19 pandemic measures forcing the temporary closure of cinemas, Fan Girl was made available for online streaming via Upstream.

== Reception ==
Fan Girl won major recognition at the 2020 Metro Manila Film Festival Awards Night including the Best Picture award. Leads Paulo Avelino and Charlie Dizon were given the Best Actor and Best Actress awards, respectively. Antoinette Jadaone was also recognized as Best Director. A scene involving Avelino exhibiting improvised frontal nudity also received significant reception in social media.

== Accolades ==
Year	Award-Giving Body	Category	Recipient	Result	Ref.
2020	Metro Manila Film Festival	Best Actress	Charlie Dizon	Won	
2020	Metro Manila Film Festival	Best Actor	Paulo Avelino	Won	
2020	Metro Manila Film Festival	Best Director	Antoinette Jadaone	Won	
2020	Metro Manila Film Festival	Best Picture	Fan Girl (Black Sheep Productions and Globe Studios)	Won	
2020	Metro Manila Film Festival	Best Screenplay	Antoinette Jadaone	Won	
2020	Metro Manila Film Festival	Best Cinematography	Neil Daza	Won	
2020	Metro Manila Film Festival	Best Editing	Benjamin Tolentino	Won	
2020	Metro Manila Film Festival	Best Sound	Vincent Villa	Won	
2020	Metro Manila Film Festival	Best Musical Score	Teresa Barrozo	Nominated	
2020	Metro Manila Film Festival	Best Virtual Float	Fan Girl	Nominated	
2020	2nd VP Choice Awards	Movie of the Year	Fan Girl	Won	
2021	The Entertainment Editors' Choice	Best Actress	Charlie Dizon	Won	
2021	The Entertainment Editors' Choice	Best Actor	Paulo Avelino	Won	
2021	The Entertainment Editors' Choice	Best Director	Antoinette Jadaone	Won	
2021	The Entertainment Editors' Choice	Best Picture	Fan Girl (Black Sheep Productions and Globe Studios)	Won	
2021	The Entertainment Editors' Choice	Best Screenplay	Antoinette Jadaone	Won	
2021	The Entertainment Editors' Choice	Best Editing	Benjamin Tolentino	Won	
2021	The Entertainment Editors' Choice	Best Sound	Vincent Villa	Won	
