= Magikland (film) =

2020 Philippine fantasy action film

- Official release poster
- Directed by: Christian Acuña
- Screenplay by: Rod Marmol; Pat Apura
- Story by: Rod Marmol; Pat Apura
- Produced by: Albee Benitez; Rey Bantug; Peque Gallaga; Lore Reyes
- Starring: Miggs Cuaderno; Elijah Alejo; Princess Aliyah; Josh Eugenio
- Cinematography: Rody Lacap
- Edited by: Manet A. Dayrit
- Music by: Emerzon Quintillan Texon
- Production companies: Brightlight Productions; Gallaga Reyes Films
- Distributed by: Upstream
- Release date: December 25, 2020
- Country: Philippines
- Language: Filipino
- Budget: ₱100 million+

Magikland is a 2020 Philippine fantasy adventure film, directed by Christian Acuña, produced by Brightlight Productions and Gallaga Reyes Films. It is an official entry to the 2020 Metro Manila Film Festival. It revolves around four children who get transported to Magikland, a fantasy world which is a setting of a mobile game.

== Plot ==
On Christmas Eve, Boy (Miggs Cuaderno) spends the night with his hospitalized and dying mother (Jaclyn Jose), sisters Mara (Elijah Alejo) and Kit (Princess Aliyah) have dinner with their estranged parents (Audie Gemora and Maricel Laxa), while Pat, a street child obtains a stolen mobile phone. The four then plays Magikland, a popular mobile game but find themselves transported to the fantasy world of the same name after they were forced to jump into a portal.

In Magikland, the four children were told by Mama Mandalagan (Bibeth Orteza), a wise woman, that they are destined to save Magikland and gave each their own quest to obtain four weapons that they would need to defeat Mogrodo-Or (Jaime Zabarte) who seeks to take over the kingdom ruled by Princess Diya (Hailey Mendez).

== Cast ==
The following are part of the Magikland's cast:

- Miggs Cuaderno as Boy / Boy Bakunawa
- Elijah Alejo as Mara / Mara Marapara
- Princess Aliyah as Kit / Kit Kanlaon
- Josh Eugenio as Pat / Pat Patag
- Jamir Zabarte as Mogrodo-Or
- Hailey Mendez as Princess Diya
- Bibeth Orteza as Mama Mandalagan

Jun Urbano also had a significant role in the film. Also part of the cast are Jackielou Blanco, Wilma Doesnt, Mylene Dizon, Cherie Gil, Maricel Laxa, Agot Isidro, Katrina Halili, Jaclyn Jose, Kurt Soberano, Luis Alandy, Paolo Contis, Gabby Eigenmann, Ryan Eigenmann and Rowell Santiago.

== Production ==
Magikland is directed by Christian Acuña with Albee Benitez, Peque Gallaga and Lore Reyes as producers. It was produced under Brightlight Productions and Gallaga Reyes Films.

Magikland reportedly consists of 70 to 95 percent animation and computer-generated imagery. Principal photography started around 2017 and took five months to complete and post-production work took two years to complete. Scenes were shot using live human actors in numerous locations including venues in Tanay and Antipolo in Rizal. Budget for the film was originally intended to not exceed ₱90 million, Magikland's production ended costing more than ₱100 million.

According to Gallaga, the theme park in Silay, Negros Occidental of the same name, was the inspiration for the film. Gallaga speaking on how the Magikland, the theme park was relevant to the conception of the film said "The theme park inspired the movie and the movie, in turn, inspired the park". Negros mythology was incorporated into the film in line with the amusement park having a Filipino-fantasy theme. The four main characters Boy Bakunawa, Mara Marapara, Pat Patag and Kit Kanlaon representing four elements were inspired from Negros folklore.

The iOS mobile game which featured in the film was inspired from the Pokémon video game franchise.

Gallaga died prior to the film's release on May 7, 2020, but production of Magikland continued with the film being 80 percent complete by July 2020.

== Release ==
Magikland was made available through Upstream on December 25, 2020, as one of the ten official entries of the 2020 Metro Manila Film Festival, which was modified into a digital event due to the COVID-19 pandemic. The film was released in selected cinemas in modified general community quarantine areas as well as KTX and iWantTFC on February 12, 2021. There film was also made available for streaming on August 1, 2021, on Netflix.

== Reception ==
Magikland garnered six honors at the awards night of the 2020 Metro Manila Film Festival. The film was critically acclaimed for its production having bagged the Best Musical Score, Best Visual Effects, and Best Production Design awards. Magikland also was awarded for Best Virtual Float (for its virtual float at the Parade of the Stars), as well as the FPJ Memorial Award. Producer Peque Gallaga was also posthumously given the Special Jury Prize.

== See also ==
- List of Christmas films
