= Ritz Azul =

Filipino actress and model (born 1994)

- Born: Ritz Ann Riggie Villafuerte Alzul; January 11, 1994 (age 32); Sta. Rita, Pampanga, Philippines
- Education: Lyceum of the Philippines University
- Occupations: Actress, television host, commercial model, singer
- Years active: 2010–present
- Agents: Talent5 (2010–2016); Star Magic (2016–2020)
- Spouse: Allan Guy (m. 2021)
- Children: 1

Ritz Ann Riggie Villafuerte Alzul-Guy (born January 11, 1994) is a Filipino actress and television host, known for her work as a talent of TV5 and later ABS-CBN through Star Magic.

== Early life and career ==
She was born in Sta. Rita, Pampanga, and later moved to Quezon City. She initially gained notice through TV5's talent search program Star Factor, where she ended up being the 4th Final Star.

She took up Bachelor of Science in Accountancy at the Lyceum of the Philippines University, but took a break from her studies to concentrate on her showbusiness career.

In 2011, she became one of TV5's Primetime Princesses, along with Danita Paner, Arci Muñoz, Jasmine Curtis and Eula Caballero. In 2016, she inked her 2-year exclusive contract under Star Magic and ABS-CBN Management, guesting on the hit primetime TV series FPJ's Ang Probinsyano topbilled by Coco Martin.

She starred in her first-ever teleserye on ABS-CBN titled The Promise of Forever, alongside her leading men Paulo Avelino and Ejay Falcon.

== Personal life ==
Ritz Azul was the Sangguniang Kabataan Chairwoman in her native town of Dila Dila in Santa Rita, Pampanga from 2010 to 2013.

Ritz Azul married her partner Allan Guy on November 20, 2021. She is also a member of the MCGI.

== Filmography ==
=== Television shows ===
Year	Title	Role
2010	Star Factor	Contestant, runner-up
2011	Hey it's Saberdey!	Hostess
2011	Untold Stories Mula sa Face to Face	Mahal
2011	Mga Nagbabagang Bulaklak	Daisy Flores
2011	Fan*tastik	Hostess
2011	Glamorosa	Giselle Evangelista / Giselle Marciano
2011	Regal Shocker: Reunion	Gail
2011	R U Kidding me? Ows hindi nga?!	Tourist
2011–2012	Pidol's Wonderland	Various
2012	Regal Shocker: Anito	Kate
2012	Maynila	Various
2012	Real Confessions	Various
2012–2013	Game N Go	Co-hostess
2012–2013	Kapitan Awesome	Love
2012–2013	Lokomoko	Herself
2013	For Love or Money	Roselle Villanueva
2013	Kidlat	Josephine 'Joey' Palomares
2013	Misibis Bay	Maita Ramirez
2013	Hayop Sa Galing	Co-hostess
2013–2015	PBA on Sports5	Studio Hostess
2013–2015	Tropa Mo Ko Unli	Herself
2015	Ismol Family	Aya
2015	Misterless Misis	Mia
2016	FPJ's Ang Probinsyano	Erica Nobleza
2016	Legally Yours, Atty. G	Guest actress
2016	Wansapanataym: Santi Cruz Is Coming To Town	Nicole Dizon
2016	Maalaala Mo Kaya: Halo-halo	Gellen
2016	Ipaglaban Mo: Bulag	Alicia
2016–2025	ASAP	Herself / co-hostess / Performer
2017	The Promise of Forever	Sophia Madrid-Espinosa
2017	Maalaala Mo Kaya: Salamin	Princess Punzalan
2017	Ipaglaban Mo: Hinala	Anna
2017–2020	Banana Sundae	Herself
2018	Ipaglaban Mo: Sumpaan	Angela
2018	Ipaglaban Mo: Abogada	Atty. Annie Valeroso
2018–2019	Precious Hearts Romances Presents: Los Bastardos	Diane Liwanag-Cuevas / Diane Liwanag-Cardinal
2019	Maalaala Mo Kaya: Pregnancy Test	Dudz Ibañez
2019	Maalaala Mo Kaya: Mikropono	Young Violeta Bayawa
2019	Bukas May Kahapon	Christine
2020	The Final Word with Rico Hizon	Herself
2020–2021	Sunday 'Kada	Herself
2021	Niña Niño	Jackie
2021	Hoy, Love You!	Mica

=== Film ===
Year	Title	Role	Notes
2018	The Hopeful Romantic	Amanda/Ashley/Veronica/Nikki	
2019	KontrAdiksyon	Korina Borlaza	
2020	The Missing		
2022	The Buy Bust Queen	Angela Bustamante	
2025	Jeongbu	Ira	

== Awards and nominations ==
Year	Film Awards/Critics	Award/Category	Movie/Shows	Result
2011	8th Golden Screen TV Awards (ENPRESS)	Outstanding Breakthrough Performance by an Actress	Nagbabagang Bulaklak (TV5)	Won
2011	Yahoo! Philippines OMG Awards	Amazing Female Newcomer	Nagbabagang Bulaklak (TV5)	Won

=== FHM 100 Sexiest Woman ===
Year	Award	Category	Result
2013	FHM Philippines	100 Sexiest Woman	Ranked No. 28
2014	FHM Philippines	100 Sexiest Woman	Ranked No. 22
2015	FHM Philippines	100 Sexiest Woman	Ranked No. 36

Preceded by Yam Concepcion	FHM Cover Girl (November 2012)	Succeeded by Meg Imperial
