= Isa Pang Bahaghari =

2019 Philippine drama film

- Official release poster
- Directed by: Joel Lamangan
- Produced by: Harlene Bautista; Jose Mari Abacan
- Starring: Nora Aunor; Phillip Salvador; Michael de Mesa; Zanjoe Marudo; Joseph Marco; Sanya Lopez; Maris Racal; Albie Casiño
- Production companies: Heaven’s Best Entertainment; Solar Pictures
- Distributed by: GMA Pictures
- Release date: December 25, 2020 (Metro Manila Film Festival)
- Country: Philippines
- Language: Filipino

Isa Pang Bahaghari (transl. "Another Rainbow") is a 2020 Philippine drama film directed by Joel Lamangan and produced by Heaven's Best Entertainment and Solar Pictures, distributed by GMA Pictures starring Nora Aunor, Phillip Salvador, Michael de Mesa, Zanjoe Marudo, Joseph Marco, Sanya Lopez, Maris Racal, Albie Casiño and Migs Almendras. The film premiered at the 2020 Metro Manila Film Festival.

== Plot ==
The story is now more focused on the attempts of Domeng (Phillip Salvador), an erring father, to obtain the family's forgiveness especially to his wife Lumen (Nora Aunor) when he left them behind 20 years ago. They have three children: Andy (Zanjoe Marudo), a drug pusher; Peter (Joseph Marco), a waiter falsely accused of raping his girlfriend; and Dolly (Sanya Lopez), a single mom who works as a bar dancer.

Rey ( Michael de Mesa), the mutual friend of Domeng and Lumen, who served as a bridge in their love affair as adolescents, and now seeks to be the mediator for Domeng's reconciliation with his estranged wife and children. He is the traditional "baklang martir" who, since they were teenagers, has been in love with Domeng, continues to love him even now that they are in their 60s, and will do anything to support not just him, but Lumen as well.

== Cast ==
Lead cast

- Phillip Salvador as Domingo "Domeng / Dom" delos Reyes
- Nora Aunor as Iluminada "Lumen" Sanchez-delos Santos
- Michael de Mesa as Reynaldo "Rhey / Reynalda" Torrecampo
- Zanjoe Marudo as Andrew "Andy" Sanchez
- Joseph Marco as Peter Anthony Sanchez / Antonia Sanchez-Delos Reyes
- Sanya Lopez as Dolores "Dolly / Dolly Ariana" Sanchez

Supporting cast

- Jim Pebanco as Kapitan Larry
- Fanny Serrano as Toots
- Lloyd Samartino as Cenen
- Angela Cortez as Katkat
- Tabs Sumulong as Maring
- Carla Humphries as Atty. Arlene Balmes
- Xixi Maturan as Jojo
- Shido Roxas as Edwin
- Kristine Grace Loresto as Jenjen
- Juliane Earnest Costo as Popoy
- Dorothy Gilmore as Mommy Shirley
- Marie Preizer as Monica Perez
- Hero Bautista as Mr. Perez
- Christian Alano as Charles

Special participation

- Albie Casiño as young Domeng
- Maris Racal as young Lumen
- Migs Almendras as young Rhey
- Dave Bornea as young Cenen

Tirso Cruz III and Christopher de Leon were initially part of the cast but was replaced by Salvador and de Mesa.

== Release ==
Isa Pang Bahaghari was planned to be submitted as a finished-film entry for the 2019 Metro Manila Film Festival, however the film was not among the eight official entries for that event. It was accepted as an official entry of the 2020 Metro Manila Summer Film Festival instead. However the summer film festival was cancelled due to the COVID-19 pandemic. The film was then accepted as one of the ten entries of the 2020 Metro Manila Film Festival and was released on December 25, 2020 via UpStream.

== Awards and nominations ==
| Year | Group | Category | Nominee | Result |
|---|---|---|---|---|
| 2020 | Metro Manila Film Festival | Best Actress | Nora Aunor | Nominated |
| 2020 | Metro Manila Film Festival | Best Actor | Phillip Salvador | Nominated |
| 2020 | Metro Manila Film Festival | Best Supporting Actor | Michael de Mesa | Won |
| 2020 | Metro Manila Film Festival | Best Supporting Actor | Zanjoe Marudo | Nominated |
| 2020 | Metro Manila Film Festival | Best in Editing | Mai Calaparado | Nominated |
| 2020 | Metro Manila Film Festival | Best Original Theme Song | Hanggang Muli by Emerson Texon | Nominated |
| 2020 | Metro Manila Film Festival | Best Virtual Float | - | Nominated |
| 2020 | Metro Manila Film Festival | Gatpuno Antonio J. Villegas Cultural Award | Isa Pang Bahaghari | Nominated |
| 2020 | Metro Manila Film Festival | Fernando Poe Jr. Memorial Award for Excellence | Isa Pang Bahaghari | Nominated |
| 2020 | Metro Manila Film Festival | Gender Sensitivity Award | Isa Pang Bahaghari | Nominated |
| 2021 | GEMS: Hiyas ng Sining | Best Film (Indie or Mainstream) | Isa Pang Bahaghari | Nominated |
| 2021 | GEMS: Hiyas ng Sining | Best Film Director | Joel Lamangan | Nominated |
| 2021 | GEMS: Hiyas ng Sining | Best Performance by an Actress in a Lead Role | Nora Aunor | Won |
| 2021 | GEMS: Hiyas ng Sining | Best Performance by an Actor in a Lead Role | Phillip Salvador | Won |
| 2021 | GEMS: Hiyas ng Sining | Best Performance by an Actor in Supporting Role | Michael de Mesa | Won |
| 2021 | GEMS: Hiyas ng Sining | Best Performance by an Actor in Supporting Role | Zanjoe Marudo | Nominated |
| 2021 | GEMS: Hiyas ng Sining | Film Production of the Year | Heaven's Best Entertainment | Nominated |
| 2021 | GEMS: Hiyas ng Sining | Natatanging Pelikulang Pampamilya (Special Awards) | Isa Pang Bahaghari | Won |
