= Alfred Vargas =

Filipino actor and politician (born 1979)

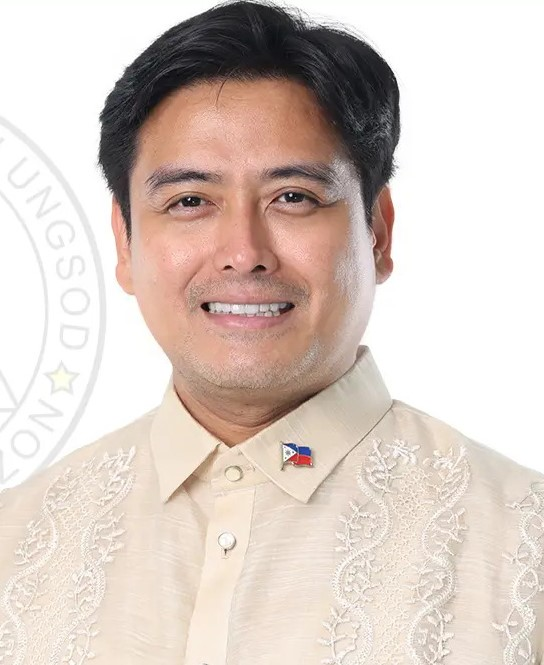
- Official portrait, 2025

Member of the Quezon City Council
- Incumbent
- Assumed office June 30, 2022
- Constituency: 5th District
- In office June 30, 2010 – June 30, 2013
- Constituency: 2nd District

Member of the Philippine House of Representatives from Quezon City's 5th district
- In office June 30, 2013 – June 30, 2022
- Preceded by: District created
- Succeeded by: Patrick Michael Vargas

Personal details
- Born: Alfredo Paolo Dumlao Vargas III; October 24, 1979 (age 47) Quezon City, Philippines
- Party: SBP (local party; 2018–present)
- Other political affiliations: Lakas (2009–2010); Liberal (2010–2017); PDP (2017–2022)
- Spouse: Yasmine Espiritu (m. 2010)
- Relations: Patrick Michael "PM" Vargas (brother)
- Children: 4
- Education: Ateneo de Manila University (AB); University of the Philippines Diliman (MPA)
- Profession: TV host; actor; entrepreneur; politician

Alfredo Paolo Dumlao Vargas III (born October 24, 1979) is a Filipino politician, actor, and model serving as a councilor of Quezon City from the 5th district since 2022. He previously served as a city councilor from the 2nd district from 2010 to 2013 and as representative from the 5th district from 2013 to 2022. As an actor, he is known for his portrayal of Aquil and Amarro in the Encantadia franchise.

== Biography ==
=== Early life and education ===
Vargas was born on October 24, 1979, in Quezon City to Alfredo "Freddieboy" Vargas Jr. and Susana Dumlao-Vargas.

He graduated in A.B. Management Economics in Ateneo de Manila University. For his graduate studies, he went to the University of the Philippines Diliman and earned his master's degree in Public Administration.

=== Acting career ===
As an actor, he started his career as a member of ABS-CBN Star Magic (formerly Star Circle) acting workshop Batch 10. From there, he had his TV role in the drama soap opera, Pangako Sa 'Yo, from the same network. But this Ateneo de Manila graduate was acting in theatre long before the talent scouts lured him into television. He was also a front man of his own band, Privado.

He was working on a GMA soap opera, which turned out to be Kambal, Karibal while still balancing his congressional work.

=== Personal life ===
Vargas married Yasmine Espiritu in 2010. They have four children.

== Political career ==
In Quezon City local elections for District 2 on May 10, 2010, he was elected city councilor, with the second-highest number of votes in the district.

Vargas was later elected as the first representative of the newly created 5th district in 2013. He was re-elected in 2016. In 2017, he left the Liberal Party for PDP–Laban, the ruling party under President Rodrigo Duterte. In 2019, Vargas was reelected under the local ticket of Hugpong ng Pagbabago, defeating 4 other candidates.

He has passed Republic Acts including RA 10931 Universal Access to Quality Tertiary Education Act, RA 10645 mandating PhilHealth coverage for all senior citizens, RA 10747 Rare Diseases Act of the Philippines. He constantly campaigns for vulnerable sector such as Persons With Disabilities and cancer patients. Likewise, he is known to push for traffic alleviation through Point-to-Point or P2P methods.

Being term-limited, Vargas successfully ran for councilor and switched places with his brother, councilor Patrick Michael Vargas, in 2022.

== House committee and memberships ==
Committee	Position
Social Services	Chairperson
Appropriations	Vice Chairperson
Basic Education And Culture	Member for the Majority
Ecology	Member for the Majority
Government Enterprises And Privatization	Member for the Majority
Housing And Urban Development	Member for the Majority
Information And Communications Technology	Member for the Majority
Legislative Franchises	Member for the Majority
Metro Manila Development	Member for the Majority
National Defense And Security	Member for the Majority
Natural Resources	Member for the Majority
Science And Technology	Member for the Majority
Transportation	Member for the Majority
Youth And Sports Development	Member for the Majority

== Republic Acts ==
Serving two terms as a Congressman of District 5, Quezon City, Rep. Alfred Vargas was able to pass 17 Republic Acts:

Republic Act No.	Short Title	Full Title
RA 10644	Go Negosyo Act	An Act promoting job generation and inclusive growth through the development of micro, small and medium enterprises
RA 10645	Member for the Majority	An Act providing for the mandatory PhilHealth coverage for all senior citizens, amending for the purpose Republic Act No. 7423, as amended by RA 9994, otherwise known as the "Expanded Senior Citizens Act of 2010"
RA 10646	Charter of the Quezon City Development Authority	An Act creating the Quezon City Development Authority (QCDA), defining its powers and functions, providing for its organizational structure and capitalization
RA 10648	Iskolar ng Bayan Act of 2015	An Act providing scholarship grants to top graduates of all public high schools in state universities and colleges and appropriating funds therefore
RA 10667	Philippine Competition Act	An Act providing for a National Competition Policy prohibiting anti-competitive agreements, abuse of dominant position and anti-competitive mergers and acquisitions, establishing the Philippine Competition Commission and appropriating funds therefore
RA 10668		An Act allowing foreign vessels to transport and co-load foreign cargoes for domestic transshipment and for other purposes
RA 10679	Youth Entrepreneurship Act	An Act promoting entrepreneurship and financial education among Filipino youth
RA 10687	Unified Student Financial Assistance System for Tertiary Education (UniFAST) Act	An Act providing for a comprehensive and unified student financial assistance system for tertiary education (UniFAST), thereby rationalizing access thereto, appropriating funds therefor and for other purposes
RA 10716		An Act changing the name of Batasan Hills National High School in Barangay Batasan Hills, City of Quezon, Metro Manila to Corazon C. Aquino National High School
RA 10742	Sangguniang Kabataan Reform Act of 2015	An Act establishing reforms in the Sangguniang Kabataan, creating enabling mechanisms for meaningful youth participation in nation-building, and for other purposes
RA 10747	Rare Diseases Act of the Philippines	An Act promulgating a comprehensive policy in addressing the needs of persons with rare disease
RA 10867	NBI Reorganization and Modernization Act	An Act reorganizing and modernizing the National Bureau of Investigation (NBI), and providing funds therefor
RA 10906	Anti-Mail Order Spouse Act	An Act providing stronger measures against unlawful practices, businesses, and schemes of matching and offering Filipinos to foreign nationals for purposes of marriage or common law partnership, repealing for the purpose RA 6955, also referred to as the "Anti-Mail Order Bride Law"
RA 10916	Road Speed Limiter Act of 2016	An Act requiring the mandatory installation of speed limiter in public utility and certain types of vehicles
RA 10922	Economic and Financial Literacy Act	An Act declaring the second week of November of every week as Economic and Financial Literacy Week
RA 10930		An Act Rationalizing and Strengthening the Policy Regarding Driver's License By Extending the Validity Period of Driver's Licenses, and Penalizing Acts in Violation of its Issuance and Application, Amending for those Purposes Section 23 of Republic Act No. 4136, as Amended by Batas Pambansa Blg. 398 and Executive Order No. 1011, Otherwise Known as the Land Transportation and Traffic Code
RA 10931	Universal Access to Quality Tertiary Education Act	An Act Promoting Universal Access to Quality Tertiary Education by Providing for Free Tuition and other School Fees in State Universities and Colleges, Local Universities and Colleges and State-Rum Technical-Vocational Institutions, Establishing the Tertiary Education Subsidy and Student Loan Program, Strengthening the Unified Student Financial Assistance System for Tertiary Education, and Appropriating Funds Therefore,

== Electoral history ==
Electoral history of Alfred Vargas
Year	Office	Party		Votes received				Result
Year	Office	Local	National	Total	%	P.	Swing	Result
2010	Councilor (Quezon City–2nd)	—N/a	Lakas–Kampi	202,370	11.03%	2nd	—N/a	Won
2022	Councilor (Quezon City–5th)	SBP	PDP–Laban	138,673	13.05%	2nd	—N/a	Won
2025	Councilor (Quezon City–5th)	SBP	—N/a	135,104	13.01%	3rd	-0.04	Won
2013	Representative (Quezon City–5th)	—N/a	Liberal	64,701	56.29%	1st	—N/a	Won
2016	Representative (Quezon City–5th)	—N/a	Liberal	134,946	84.16%	1st	+27.87	Unopposed
2019	Representative (Quezon City–5th)	SBP	PDP–Laban	132,047	85.70%	1st	+1.54	Won

== Filmography ==
=== Film ===
Year	Title	Role	Notes	Source
2003	Liberated	James		
2004	Bridal Shower	Joebert Pugeda		
2005	Bikini Open	Ross Ortega		
2005	Ang Lagusan	Noni		
2006	I Wanna Be Happy	Ken		
2006	Gigil	Felix		
2006	Zsazsa Zaturnnah Ze Moveeh	Dodong		
2007	Faces of Love			
2007	Banal	Jayson Ramos		
2009	Status: Single	Sean		
2009	When I Met U	Albert		
2009	Colorum	Simon Madriga		
2011	Amamanhig	Ben Jalandoni		
2012	Supremo	Andres Bonifacio		
2015	Felix Manalo	Prudencio Vasquez		
2017	Ang Guro Kong 'Di Marunong Magbasa			
2018	Badge of Honor: To Serve and Protect	PMaj. Rolando Ramos	Theatrically released nationwide on August 16, 2023	
2019	Wild Little Love	Luis		
2020	Tagpuan			
2023	Pieta	Isaac		
2024	Lolo and the Kid	Joel		

=== Television ===
Year	Title	Role	Notes	Source
2000–2002	Pangako Sa 'Yo	Dyno Zuryete		
2003	Tipong Pinoy	Himself – Host		
2001–2003	Sa Dulo ng Walang Hanggan	Lauro		
2004	Marinara	Felipe		
2005	Encantadia	Aquil		
2005	Love to Love	Mike		
2005–2006	Etheria: Ang Ikalimang Kaharian ng Encantadia	Amarro/Aquil		
2006	Encantadia: Pag-ibig Hanggang Wakas	Aquil		
2006	I Luv NY	Sebastian Santos		
2006	Komiks Presents: Kapitan Aksyon	Kapitan Aksyon		
2006	Ang Pagbabago	Himself – Host		
2006	Pinakamamahal			
2007	Magic Kamison	Jaren Absede		
2007	Muli	Lukas Estadilla		
2007	Mga Kuwento ni Lola Basyang: Ang Prinsipeng Mahaba ang Ilong	Benito		
2007	Impostora	Dr. Carlos Pambide		
2007–2008	Sine Novela: My Only Love	Emman Angeles		
2008	E.S.P.	Dave		
2008	Mars Ravelo's Dyesebel	Erebus		
2008	Sine Novela: Una Kang Naging Akin	Ronnie Bautista		
2009	All About Eve	Warren Bautista		
2009	Zorro	Captain Lima Wong		
2009	Dear Friend	Ron	Episode: "Karibal"	
2009–2010	Mars Ravelo's Darna	Gabriel Ramirez		
2011	Pablo S. Gomez's Mutya	Prince Irvin		
2011–2012	Ikaw ay Pag-Ibig	Mario Reyes		
2012	Lorenzo's Time	Dr. Carlos Ramirez		
2012	Maalaala Mo Kaya	Lenny	Episode: "Gayuma"	
2013	Wansapanataym	Mr. Perez	Episode: "Si Pam Pabaya At Ang Mahiwagang Goldfish"	
2015	Magpakailanman	Edgardo	Episode: "Ang Batang Isinilang Sa Bilangguan" with Gwen Zamora	
2016–2017	Encantadia	Amarro		
2017	Tadhana	Joshua Pettigrew		
2017—2018	Kambal, Karibal	Allan Magpantay		
2018	FPJ's Ang Probinsyano	PSupt. Albert Laquiores		
2019	Magkaagaw	Mario Santos		
2021	Legal Wives	Naseer Makadatu		
2022	Unica Hija	Christian Sebastian		
2023	AraBella	Ariel Abarro		
2024	Forever Young	Gregory Agapito		

== Awards ==
As a public servant, Congressman Alfred Vargas garnered the following awards:

- 2013 MWWF Gintong Palad Award for Public Service
- Dekada Awardee, Gallery of Distinction, Golden Screen Awards
- Most Outstanding City Councilor, Manuel L. Quezon Bantayog Award, 2013
- Most Outstanding Councilor, Manuel L. Quezon Bantayog Award, 2012
- Special Award for Excellence in Public Service for 2012, Aliw Awards Foundation, Inc.
- Gintong Kabataan Award, Bulacan Outstanding Youth Achievement Award, 2008
- Outstanding Surigaonon Award for Theater and Arts, Rotary Club, 2007

He won the following as an actor:

- Best Actor, 10th Golden Screen Awards for Supremo
- Eastwood Walk of Fame Award, 2012
- Huwarang Artista sa Larangan ng Serbisyo Publiko, Famas Awards, 2012
- Dangal ng Lipi Award, 2010 Best Actor, MTRCB, 2010
- Best Actor Nominee, Gawad Urian Awards, 2010
- Top 10 Bachelors of 2007, Cosmopolitan Magazine
- Breakthrough Performance by an Actor, Golden Screen Awards, 2004
- 2nd Golden Screen Entertainment TV Awards of Enpress – Outstanding Supporting Actor in a Drama series for Encantadia (nominated, tied with Pen Medina)
- Gawad Urian – Best Supporting Actor for Bridal Shower (nominated)
- Golden Screen Award – Breakthrough Performance by an Actor for Bridal Shower (won)
- 2012 35th Gawad Urian Awards – Best Actor (Pinakamahusay na Pangunahing Aktor) for Teoriya (nominated)

House of Representatives of the Philippines
New district	Member of the House of Representatives from Quezon City's 5th district 2013–2022	Succeeded by Patrick Michael Vargas
