= Gawad Urian for Best Actress =

Annual Philippine film award

- Awarded for: Pinakamahusay na Aktres (Best Lead Actress)
- Country: Philippines
- Presented by: Manunuri ng Pelikulang Pilipino
- First award: 1977
- Currently held by: Maris Racal; Odette Khan
- Website: http://www.manunuri.com

The Gawad Urian for Best Actress (Filipino: Gawad Urian para sa Pinakamahusay na Aktres) is a movie award given by the Manunuri ng Pelikulang Pilipino (Filipino Film Critics) to lead actresses in a Philippine movie.

The current award holders are Maris Racal for Sunshine and Odette Khan for Bar Boys: After School.

== Winners and nominees ==
In the lists below, the winner of the award for each year is shown first, followed by the other nominees.

=== 1970s ===
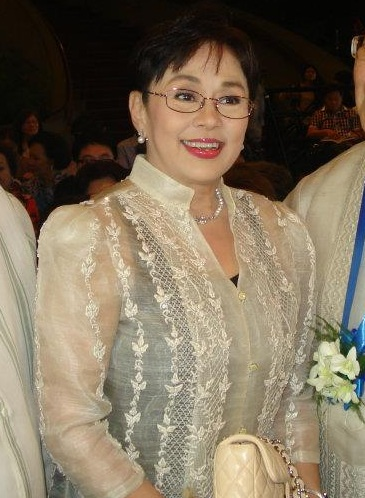
Legendary movie and box-office queen Vilma Santos is Gawad Urian's most decorated thespian. She won 8 best actress awards and holds the record for winning it three years in a row: Relasyon (1982), Broken Marriage (1983) and Sister Stella L. (1984).

Year	Actress	Film	Role
1977 (1st)
1977 (1st)	Nora Aunor	Tatlong Taóng Walang Diyos	Rosario
1977 (1st)	Charo Santos	Itim	Teresa
1977 (1st)	Daria Ramirez	Nunal sa Tubig	Chedeng
1977 (1st)	Hilda Koronel	Insiang	Insiang
1977 (1st)	Lolita Rodriguez	Lunes, Martes, Miyerkules, Huwebes, Biyernes, Sabado, Linggo	
1977 (1st)	Mona Lisa	Insiang	Tonya
1978 (2nd)
1978 (2nd)	Daria Ramirez	Sinong Kapiling? Sinong Kasiping?	
1978 (2nd)	Alicia Alonzo	Tahan Na, Empoy, Tahan	
1978 (2nd)	Alicia Vergel	Inay	Inay
1978 (2nd)	Hilda Koronel	Kung Mangarap Ka't Magising	Ana
1978 (2nd)	Vilma Santos	Burlesk Queen	Chato
1979 (3rd)
1979 (3rd)	Beth Bautista	Hindi sa Iyo ang Mundo, Baby Porcuna	Baby Porcuna
1979 (3rd)	Chanda Romero	Mananayaw	
1979 (3rd)	Elizabeth Oropesa	Isang Gabi sa Iyo, Isang Gabi sa Akin	
1979 (3rd)	Nora Aunor	Ikaw Ay Akin	Teresita Valdez
1979 (3rd)	Vilma Santos	Ikaw Ay Akin	Sandra Aragon

=== 1980s ===
Year	Actress	Film	Role
1980 (4th)
1980 (4th)	Charito Solis	Ina, Kapatid, Anak	Emilia
1980 (4th)	Liza Lorena	Gabun	
1980 (4th)	Lolita Rodriguez	Ina Ka ng Anak Mo	Renata
1980 (4th)	Nora Aunor	Ina Ka ng Anak Mo	Esther
1980 (4th)	Suzette Ranillo	Aliw	Lingling
1981 (5th)
1981 (5th)	Gina Alajar	Brutal	Cynthia
1981 (5th)	Nora Aunor	Bona	Bona
1981 (5th)	Amy Austria	Brutal	Monica Real
1981 (5th)	Cherie Gil	Manila by Night	Kano
1981 (5th)	Rio Locsin	Manila by Night	Bea
1982 (6th)
1982 (6th)	Gina Alajar	Salome	Salome
1982 (6th)	Charito Solis	Playgirl	
1982 (6th)	Nora Aunor	Bakit Bughaw ang Langit?	Babette
1983 (7th)
1983 (7th)	Vilma Santos	Relasyon	Marilou
1983 (7th)	Gina Alajar	Moral	
1983 (7th)	Lorna Tolentino	Moral	Joey
1983 (7th)	Nora Aunor	Himala	Elsa
1984 (8th)
1984 (8th)	Vilma Santos	Broken Marriage	Ellen
1984 (8th)	Cecille Castillo	Karnal	Puring
1985 (9th)
1985 (9th)	Vilma Santos	Sister Stella L.	Sister Stella Legaspi
1985 (9th)	Claudia Zobel	Sinner or Saint	
1985 (9th)	Gina Pareño	Working Girls	Nimfa Sucgang
1985 (9th)	Nora Aunor	'Merika	
1985 (9th)	Nora Aunor	Bulaklak sa City Jail	Angela Aguilar
1985 (9th)	Sarsi Emmanuelle	Boatman	
1986 (10th)
1986 (10th)	Gina Alajar	Kapit sa Patalim	Luz
1986 (10th)	Nida Blanca	Miguelito	Auring
1986 (10th)	Chanda Romero	Bakit Manipis ang Ulap?	
1986 (10th)	Jaclyn Jose	White Slavery	
1986 (10th)	Lolita Rodriguez	Paradise Inn	Esther
1987 (11th)
1987 (11th)	Jaclyn Jose	Takaw Tukso	Letty
1987 (11th)	Pilar Pilapil	Napakasakit, Kuya Eddie	
1987 (11th)	Anna Marie Gutierrez	Takaw Tukso	Debbie
1987 (11th)	Jaclyn Jose	Private Show	Myrna
1987 (11th)	Liza Lorena	Halimaw	
1988
1988	The MPP decides not to give out any awards this year.		
1989 (12th)
1989 (12th)	Jaclyn Jose	Itanong Mo sa Buwan	Josie
1989 (12th)	Jackie Lou Blanco	Misis Mo, Misis Ko	Cynthia
1989 (12th)	Lorna Tolentino	Natutulog Pa ang Diyos	Gillian
1989 (12th)	Snooky Serna	Kapag Napagod ang Puso	Rosalie

=== 1990s ===
Year	Actress	Film	Role
1990 (13th)
1990 (13th)	Nora Aunor	Bilangin ang Bituin sa Langit	Noli / Maggie
1990 (13th)	Vilma Santos	Pahiram ng Isang Umaga	Juliet
1990 (13th)	Helen Gamboa	Kailan Mahuhugasan ang Kasalanan?	Adora Meneses
1990 (13th)	Janice de Belen	Rosenda	Rosenda
1991 (14th)
1991 (14th)	Nora Aunor	Andrea, Paano Ba ang Maging Isang Ina?	Andrea
1991 (14th)	Dina Bonnevie	Gumapang Ka sa Lusak	Rachel Suarez
1991 (14th)	Gina Alajar	Andrea, Paano Ba ang Maging Isang Ina?	Joyce
1991 (14th)	Vilma Santos	Kapag Langit ang Humatol	Floridablanca
1991 (14th)	Vivian Velez	Kasalanan Bang Sambahin Ka?	Catherine Posadas
1992 (15th)
1992 (15th)	Vilma Santos	Ipagpatawad Mo	Celina
1992 (15th)	Dawn Zulueta	Hihintayin Kita sa Langit	Carmina
1992 (15th)	Dina Bonnevie	Sa Kabila ng Lahat	Maria Robles
1992 (15th)	Lorna Tolentino	Kislap sa Dilim	Ciena
1992 (15th)	Nora Aunor	Ang Totoong Buhay ni Pacita M.	Pacita Macaspac
1993 (16th)
1993 (16th)	Lorna Tolentino	Narito ang Puso Ko	Ellen Cortez Chavez
1993 (16th)	Dawn Zulueta	Iisa Pa Lamang	Clara
1993 (16th)	Maricel Laxa	Ikaw ang Lahat sa Akin	Anna
1993 (16th)	Maricel Soriano	Ikaw Pa Lang ang Minahal	Adela Sevilla
1993 (16th)	Sharon Cuneta	Tayong Dalawa	Carol
1993 (16th)	Vilma Santos	Sinungaling Mong Puso	Lucinda
1994 (17th)
1994 (17th)	Vilma Santos	Dahil Mahal Kita	Dolzura Cortez
1994 (17th)	Dawn Zulueta	Saan Ka Man Naroroon	Amanda
1994 (17th)	Lorna Tolentino	Gaano Kita Kamahal	Auring Suclad
1994 (17th)	Maricel Laxa	Makati Ave. Office Girls	Carinza
1995 (18th)
1995 (18th)	Gelli de Belen	The Secrets of Sarah Jane	Sarah Jane
1995 (18th)	Carmina Villarroel	Wating	Rosel
1995 (18th)	Kris Aquino	The Fatima Buen Story	Fatima Buen
1996 (19th)
1996 (19th)	Helen Gamboa	Bagong Bayani	Flor Contemplacion
1996 (19th)	Nora Aunor	The Flor Contemplacion Story	Flor Contemplacion
1996 (19th)	Lea Salonga	Sana Maulit Muli	Agnes
1996 (19th)	Lorna Tolentino	Sa Ngalan ng Pag-ibig	Mae
1996 (19th)	Maricel Soriano	Dahas	Luisa
1996 (19th)	Sharmaine Arnaiz	Kapag May Katwiran, Ipaglaban Mo!	Maria
1997 (20th)
1997 (20th)	Nora Aunor	Bakit May Kahapon Pa?	Helen Morda / Karina Salvacion
1997 (20th)	Sharon Cuneta	Madrasta	Mariel
1997 (20th)	Dina Bonnevie	Abot-Kamay ang Pangarap	Carla
1997 (20th)	Jaclyn Jose	Mulanay	Dra. Ria Espinosa
1997 (20th)	Lorna Tolentino	May Nagmamahal sa Iyo	Louella
1997 (20th)	Maricel Soriano	Abot-Kamay ang Pangarap	Elena
1998 (21st)
1998 (21st)	Zsa Zsa Padilla	Batang PX	Tessie
1998 (21st)	Maricel Soriano	Minsan Lamang Magmamahal	Marietta
1998 (21st)	Nora Aunor	Babae	Bea
1998 (21st)	Rosanna Roces	Ligaya ang Itawag Mo sa Akin	Ligaya
1998 (21st)	Sharmaine Arnaiz	Milagros	Milagros
1998 (21st)	Sharon Cuneta	Nang Iniwan Mo Ako	Amy Lorenzo
1999 (22nd)
1999 (22nd)	Vilma Santos	Bata, Bata, Paano Ka Ginawa?	Lea
1999 (22nd)	Elizabeth Oropesa	Sa Pusod ng Dagat	Rosa
1999 (22nd)	Nida Blanca	Sana Pag-ibig Na	Linda Perez
1999 (22nd)	Rosanna Roces	Curacha	Curacha

=== 2000s ===
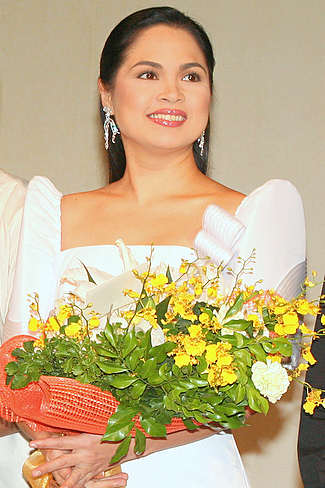
Judy Ann Santos is Gawad Urian Best Actress in 2005.

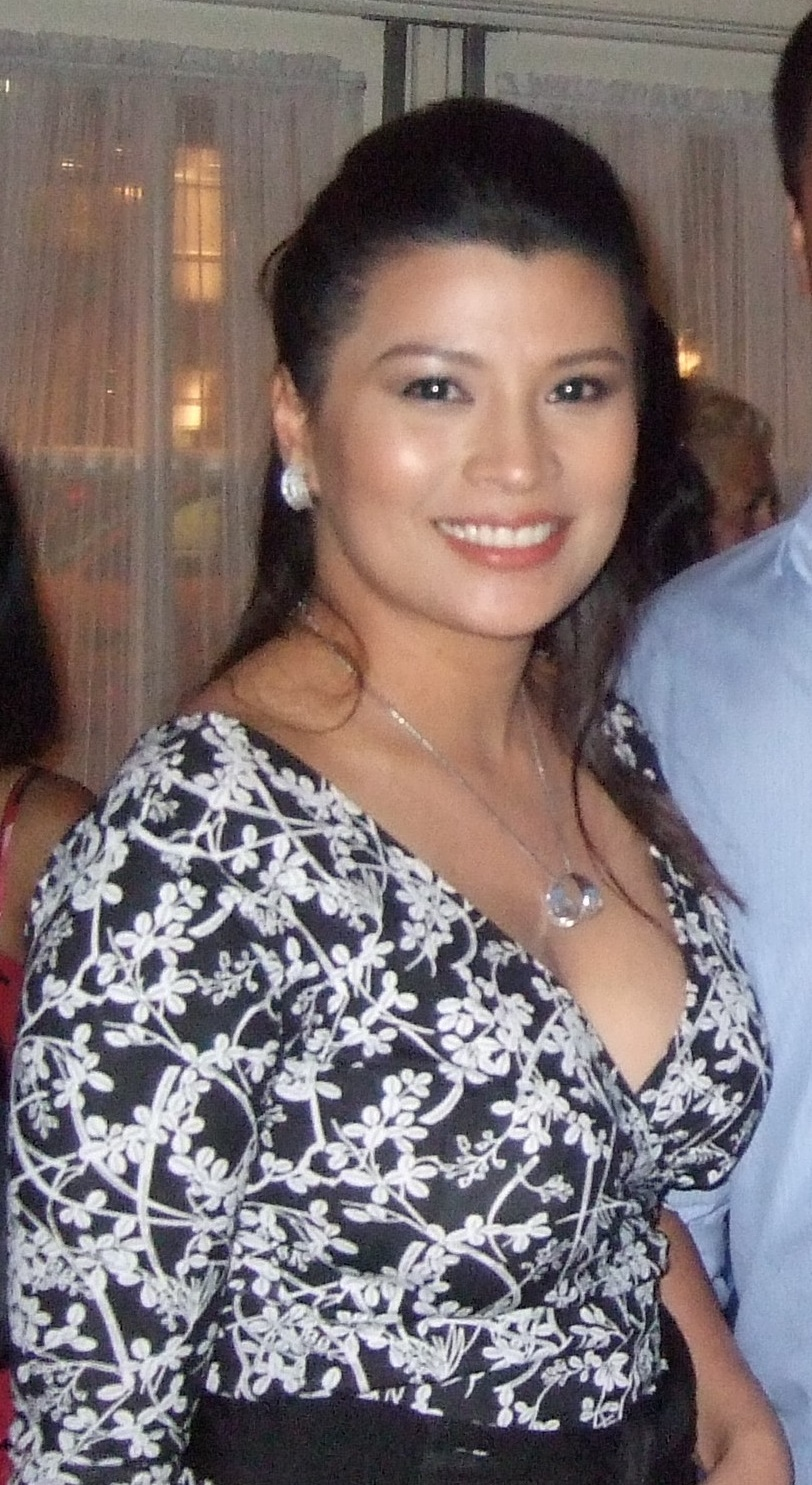
Mylene Dizon is Gawad Urian Best Actress in 2009.

Year	Actress	Film	Role
2000 (23rd)
2000 (23rd)	Elizabeth Oropesa	Bulaklak ng Maynila	Azun
2000 (23rd)	Ana Capri	Pila Balde	Gina
2000 (23rd)	Lorna Tolentino	Luksong Tinik	Beth Pineda
2000 (23rd)	Maricel Soriano	Soltera	Sandra Valdez
2000 (23rd)	Mona Lisa	Mother Ignacia	Sister Josefa Salcedo
2000 (23rd)	Nora Aunor	Sidhi	Ana
2001 (24th)
2001 (24th)	Gloria Romero	Tanging Yaman	Loleng
2001 (24th)	Alessandra de Rossi	Azucena	Lily
2001 (24th)	Ina Raymundo	Tuhog	Floring
2001 (24th)	Irma Adlawan	Tuhog	Flor
2001 (24th)	Vilma Santos	Anak	Josie Agbisit
2002 (25th)
2002 (25th)	Assunta de Rossi	Hubog	Vanessa
2002 (25th)	Rosanna Roces	La Vida Rosa	Rosa
2002 (25th)	Jaclyn Jose	Minsan May Isang Puso	Vanessa
2002 (25th)	Maricel Soriano	Mila	Anita Pamintuan / Mila Cabangon
2002 (25th)	Mylene Dizon	Gatas sa Dibdib ng Kaaway	Pilar
2003 (26th)
2003 (26th)	Vilma Santos	Dekada '70	Amanda Bartolome
2003 (26th)	Alessandra de Rossi	Mga Munting Tinig	Melinda
2003 (26th)	Ara Mina	Mano Po	Richelle Go
2003 (26th)	Cherry Pie Picache	American Adobo	Tere
2003 (26th)	Claudine Barretto	Kailangan Kita	Elena "Lena" Duran
2003 (26th)	Dina Bonnevie	American Adobo	Marissa
2004 (27th)
2004 (27th)	Cherry Pie Picache	Bridal Shower	Katie
2004 (27th)	Ara Mina	Ang Huling Birhen sa Lupa	Edna
2004 (27th)	Dina Bonnevie	Bridal Shower	Tates
2004 (27th)	Elizabeth Oropesa	Homecoming	Mrs. Edades
2004 (27th)	Katherine Luna	Babae sa Breakwater	Paquita
2004 (27th)	Maricel Soriano	Filipinas	Yolanda Filipinas
2005 (28th)
2005 (28th)	Judy Ann Santos	Sabel	Sabel
2005 (28th)	Claudine Barretto	Milan	Jenny
2005 (28th)	Nora Aunor	Naglalayag	Dorinda
2005 (28th)	Vilma Santos	Mano Po III	Lilia Chong Yang
2006 (29th)
2006 (29th)	Jaclyn Jose	Sarong Banggi	Melba
2006 (29th)	Ana Capri	Ala Verde, Ala Pobre	Jessica
2006 (29th)	Analyn Bangsi-il	Ang Daan Patungong Kalimugtong	Erica
2006 (29th)	Claudine Barretto	Nasaan Ka Man	Pilar
2006 (29th)	Irma Adlawan	Sa North Diversion Road	Marta
2006 (29th)	Jaycee Parker	Ilusyon	Stella
2007 (30th)
2007 (30th)	Gina Pareño	Kubrador	Amelita/Amy
2007 (30th)	Andrea del Rosario	Rome & Juliet	Juliet Flores
2007 (30th)	Angel Aquino	Kaleldo	Lourdes
2007 (30th)	Cherry Pie Picache	Kaleldo	Jesusa / Jess
2007 (30th)	Jonalyn Ablong	Manoro	Jonalyn
2007 (30th)	Judy Ann Santos	Kasal, Kasali, Kasalo	Angelita / Angie
2007 (30th)	Maricel Soriano	Inang Yaya	Norma
2007 (30th)	Mylene Dizon	Rome & Juliet	Rome Miranda
2008 (31st)
2008 (31st)	Cherry Pie Picache	Foster Child	Thelma
2008 (31st)	Glaiza de Castro	Still Life	Emma
2008 (31st)	Ina Feleo	Endo	
2008 (31st)	Judy Ann Santos	Sakal, Sakali, Saklolo	Angelita/Angie
2008 (31st)	Lorna Tolentino	Katas ng Saudi	Marcy
2009 (32nd)
2009 (32nd)	Mylene Dizon	100	Joyce
2009 (32nd)	Angeli Bayani	Melancholia	
2009 (32nd)	Anita Linda	Adela	
2009 (32nd)	Boots Anson-Roa	Lovebirds	Amelia
2009 (32nd)	Gina Pareño	Serbis	
2009 (32nd)	Jaclyn Jose	Serbis	
2009 (32nd)	Judy Ann Santos	Ploning	Ploning
2009 (32nd)	Rhea Medina	Brutus	Payang

Note: Trans actress BB Gandanghari won Best Actor in the 30th Gawad Urian Awards for Zsazsa Zaturnnah (2006).

=== 2010s ===
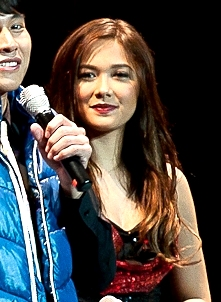
Maja Salvador is Gawad Urian Best Actress in 2012.

Year	Actress	Film	Role
2010 (33rd)
2010 (33rd)	Anita Linda	Lola	Lola Sepa
2010 (33rd)	Rustica Carpio	Lola	Lola Puring
2010 (33rd)	Che Ramos	Mangatyanan	Himalaya Marquez
2010 (33rd)	Eugene Domingo	Kimmy Dora	Kimmy Go Dong Hae / Dora Go Dong Hae
2010 (33rd)	Irma Adlawan	Ang Panggagahasa kay Fe	Fe
2010 (33rd)	Iza Calzado	Dukot	
2010 (33rd)	Janice de Belen	Last Viewing	Laura
2010 (33rd)	Rosanna Roces	Wanted: Border	Mama Saleng
2010 (33rd)	Tessie Tomas	Sanglaan	Olivia
2010 (33rd)	Vilma Santos	In My Life	Shirley Templo
2011 (34th)
2011 (34th)	Fe Gingging Hyde	Sheika	Sheika
2011 (34th)	Ces Quesada	Magkakapatid	
2011 (34th)	Donna Gimeno	Ang Damgo ni Eleuteria	Terya
2011 (34th)	Jodi Sta. Maria	Chassis	
2011 (34th)	Laurice Guillen	Karera	LV
2011 (34th)	Mercedes Cabral	Gayuma	
2011 (34th)	Meryll Soriano	Donor	
2011 (34th)	Rita Avila	Magdamag	
2012 (35th)
2012 (35th)	Maja Salvador	Thelma	Thelma
2012 (35th)	Alessandra de Rossi	Ka Oryang	Oryang
2012 (35th)	Cherry Pie Picache	Isda	Lina
2012 (35th)	Diana Zubiri	Bahay Bata	Sarah
2012 (35th)	Eugene Domingo	Ang Babae sa Septic Tank	Herself/Mila
2012 (35th)	Fides Cuyugan-Asensio	Niño	Lina
2012 (35th)	Lilia Cuntapay	Six Degrees of Separation from Lilia Cuntapay	Lilia Cuntapay
2012 (35th)	Maria Isabel Lopez	Cuchera	Isabel
2012 (35th)	Opaline Santos	The Natural Phenomenon of Madness	
2012 (35th)	Raquel Villavicencio	Bisperas	
2013 (36th)
2013 (36th)	Nora Aunor	Thy Womb	Shaleha
2013 (36th)	Alessandra de Rossi	Baybayin	Alba
2013 (36th)	Ama Quiambao	Diablo	
2013 (36th)	Assunta de Rossi	Baybayin	Alban
2013 (36th)	Gina Alajar	Mater Dolorosa	
2013 (36th)	Jodi Sta. Maria	Aparisyon	
2013 (36th)	Liza Diño	In Nomine Matris	
2013 (36th)	Olga Natividad	Mga Dayo	
2013 (36th)	Shamaine Buencamino	Requieme!	
2014 (37th)
2014 (37th)	Angeli Bayani	Norte	Eliza
2014 (37th)	Agot Isidro	Mga Anino ng Kahapon	Irene
2014 (37th)	Cherie Gil	Sonata	Regina Cadena
2014 (37th)	Eugene Domingo	Instant Mommy	Bechay
2014 (37th)	Lorna Tolentino	Burgos	Edita Burgos
2014 (37th)	Nora Aunor	Ang Kwento ni Mabuti	Mabuti
2014 (37th)	Rustica Carpio	Ano ang Kulay ng mga Nakalimutang Pangarap?	Teresa
2014 (37th)	Therese Malvar	Ang Huling Cha-cha ni Anita	Anita
2014 (37th)	Vivian Velez	Bendor	Blondie
2014 (37th)	Vilma Santos	Ekstra	Loida Malabanan
2015 (38th)
2015 (38th)	Eula Valdez	Dagitab	Issey Tolentino
2015 (38th)	Ai-Ai delas Alas	Ronda	Paloma Arroyo
2015 (38th)	Angeli Bayani	Bwaya	Divina
2015 (38th)	Angelica Panganiban	That Thing Called Tadhana	Mace Castillo
2015 (38th)	Eugene Domingo	Barber's Tales	Marilou
2015 (38th)	Hazel Orencio	Mula sa Kung Ano ang Noon	Itang
2015 (38th)	Nora Aunor	Dementia	Mara Fabre
2015 (38th)	Nova Villa	1st Ko Si 3rd	Corazon
2016 (39th)
2016 (39th)	LJ Reyes	Anino sa Likod ng Buwan	Emma
2016 (39th)	Alessandra de Rossi	Bambanti	Belyn
2016 (39th)	Angeli Bayani	Iisa	Ross
2016 (39th)	Annicka Dolonius	Apocalypse Child	Fiona
2016 (39th)	Ces Quesada	Imbisibol	Linda
2016 (39th)	Jennylyn Mercado	#WalangForever	Mia Nolasco
2016 (39th)	Mercedes Cabral	Da Dog Show	Celia
2016 (39th)	Nora Aunor	Taklub	Bebeth
2017 (40th)
2017 (40th)	Hasmine Kilip	Pamilya Ordinaryo	Jane
2017 (40th)	Ai-Ai delas Alas	Area	Hillary
2017 (40th)	Angeli Bayani	Ned's Project	Ned
2017 (40th)	Charo Santos	Ang Babaeng Humayo	Horacia Somorostro/Renata
2017 (40th)	Cherry Pie Picache	Pauwi Na	Remedios
2017 (40th)	Elizabeth Oropesa	Mrs.	Virginia
2017 (40th)	Irma Adlawan	Oro	Kapitana
2017 (40th)	Jaclyn Jose	Ma' Rosa	Rosa
2017 (40th)	Laila Ulao	Women of the Weeping River	Satra
2017 (40th)	Nora Aunor	Hinulid	Sita
2018 (41st)
2018 (41st)	Joanna Ampil	Ang Larawan	Candida Marasigan
2018 (41st)	Agot Isidro	Changing Partners	Alex
2018 (41st)	Alessandra de Rossi	Kita Kita	Lea
2018 (41st)	Angeli Bayani	Bagahe	
2018 (41st)	Angellie Sanoy	Bomba	
2018 (41st)	Bela Padilla	100 Tula Para Kay Stella	Stella
2018 (41st)	Dexter Doria	Paki	
2018 (41st)	Elizabeth Oropesa	Si Chedeng at Si Apple	Apple
2018 (41st)	Gloria Diaz	Si Chedeng at Si Apple	Chedeng
2018 (41st)	Jally Nae Gilbaliga	The Chanters	
2018 (41st)	Malona Sulatan	Tu Pug Imatuy	
2019 (42nd)
2019 (42nd)	Nadine Lustre	Never Not Love You	Joanne Candelaria
2019 (42nd)	Ai-Ai delas Alas	School Service	Nanay Rita
2019 (42nd)	Anne Curtis	BuyBust	Nina Manigan
2019 (42nd)	Anne Curtis	Sid & Aya	Aya
2019 (42nd)	Bela Padilla	Meet Me in St. Gallen	Celeste
2019 (42nd)	Celeste Legaspi	Mamang	Mamang
2019 (42nd)	Glaiza de Castro	Liway	Liway
2019 (42nd)	Iyah Mina	Mamu	Mamu
2019 (42nd)	Mai Fanglayan	Tanabata's Wife	Fas-ang
2019 (42nd)	Perla Bautista	Kung Paano Hinihintay ang Dapithapon	Teresa
2019 (42nd)	Pokwang	Oda sa Wala	Sonya

Note: Trans actress Mimi Juareza was nominated Best Actor in the 37th Gawad Urian Awards for Quick Change (2013).

=== 2020s ===
Year	Actress	Film	Role
2020 (43rd)
2020 (43rd)	Janine Gutierrez	Babae at Baril	Babae
2020 (43rd)	Alessandra de Rossi	Lucid	
2020 (43rd)	Angie Ferro	Lola Igna	Lola Igna
2020 (43rd)	Anita Linda	Circa	Doña Atang
2020 (43rd)	Bela Padilla	Mañanita	
2020 (43rd)	Jean Garcia	Watch Me Kill	
2020 (43rd)	Kathryn Bernardo	Hello, Love, Goodbye	Joy Fabregas
2020 (43rd)	Max Eigenmann	Verdict	Joy
2020 (43rd)	Nadine Lustre	Ulan	Maya Landicho
2020 (43rd)	Ruby Ruiz	Iska	Iska
2020 (43rd)	Sue Prado	Alma-ata	
2021 (44th)
2021 (44th)	Alessandra de Rossi	Watch List	Maria
2021 (44th)	Bela Padilla	On Vodka, Beers, and Regrets	Jane
2021 (44th)	Charlie Dizon	Fan Girl	Jane
2021 (44th)	Cristine Reyes	UnTrue	Mara
2021 (44th)	Glaiza de Castro	Midnight in a Perfect World	Jinka
2021 (44th)	Jasmine Curtis-Smith	Alter Me	Aimee
2021 (44th)	Lovi Poe	Malaya	Malaya
2021 (44th)	Shaina Magdayao	Tagpuan	Tanya
2021 (44th)	Sue Ramirez	Finding Agnes	Cathy
2022 (45th)
2022 (45th)	Yen Santos	A Faraway Land	Majhoy
2022 (45th)	Charo Santos	Kun Maupay Man it Panahon	Norma
2022 (45th)	Donna Cariaga	Rabid	Princess
2022 (45th)	Elora Españo	Love and Pain in Between Refrains	Adelle
2022 (45th)	Kim Molina	Ikaw at Ako at ang Ending	Mylene
2023 (46th)
2023 (46th)	Max Eigenmann	12 Weeks	Alice
2023 (46th)	Chai Fonacier	Nocebo	Diana
2023 (46th)	Nadine Lustre	Deleter	Lyra
2023 (46th)	Sheila Francisco	Leonor Will Never Die	Leonor
2024 (47th)
2024 (47th)	Charlie Dizon	Third World Romance	Britney
2024 (47th)	Gabby Padilla	Gitling	Jamie Lazaro
2024 (47th)	Kathryn Bernardo	A Very Good Girl	Philomena Angeles
2024 (47th)	Max Eigenmann	Raging Grace	Joy
2025 (48th)
2025 (48th)	Arisa Nakano	Kono Basho	Reina
2025 (48th)	Aicelle Santos	Isang Himala	Elsa
2025 (48th)	Gabby Padilla	Kono Basho	Ella
2025 (48th)	Jenaica Sangher	Tumandok	En-en
2025 (48th)	Lovi Poe	Guilty Pleasure	Alexis
2025 (48th)	Mylene Dizon	The Hearing	Madonna
2026 (48th)
2026 (48th)	Maris Racal	Sunshine	Sunshine Francisco
2026 (48th)	Odette Khan	Bar Boys: After School	Bing Hernandez
2026 (48th)	Krystel Go	I'mPerfect	Jessica
2026 (48th)	EJ Jallorina	Dreamboi	Diwa
2026 (48th)	Geraldine Villamil	Republika ng Pipolipinas	Cora Vitug
2026 (48th)	Nour Hooshmand	Cinematryrs	Shirin Dalisay
2026 (48th)	Rissey Reyes	Paglilitis	Jonalyn Samuel
2026 (48th)	Ruby Ruiz	Tigkiliwi	Pansay

== Superlatives ==
Superlative	Best Actress	
Actress with most awards	Vilma Santos	8
Actress with most nominations	Nora Aunor	21
Actress with the most consecutive wins	Vilma Santos	3
Actress with the most consecutive nominations	Nora Aunor; Angeli Bayani	5*
Actress with most nominations without ever winning	Maricel Soriano	8
Oldest Winner	Anita Linda	86
Oldest Nominee	Anita Linda	86
Youngest Winner	Assunta de Rossi	20
Youngest Nominee	Teri Malvar	13

- Nora was nominated 5 consecutive times twice in her career. the first one is from 1978–1982 and from 2012–2016.

== Multiple awards for Best Actress ==
Eight awards

- Vilma Santos

Seven awards

- Nora Aunor

Three awards

- Gina Alajar
- Jaclyn Jose

Two awards

- Cherry Pie Picache
