= 42nd Gawad Urian Awards =

Film & TV Awards show

- Date: June 18, 2019
- Site: UPFI Film Center, Diliman, Quezon City
- Hosted by: Butch Francisco; Cherie Gil

Highlights
- Best Film: BuyBust
- Most awards: BuyBust (4)
- Most nominations: BuyBust (12)

The 42nd Gawad Urian Awards (Tagalog: Ika-42 na Gawad Urian) was held on June 18, 2019 at the UPFI Film Center at the University of the Philippines. The best Philippine films for the year 2018 were honored in the event.

Nominations were announced on May 9. Buy Bust received the most nominations with ten. Eddie Garcia and Anne Curtis received double nominations in their respective categories as Best Actor and Best Actress.

Buy Bust won four awards, including Best Picture. The Natatanging Gawad Urian was awarded to Gloria Sevilla.

== Winners and nominees ==
Best Picture Pinakamahusay na Pelikula	Best Director Pinakamahusay na Direksyon
Buy Bust; A Short History of a Few Bad Things; Ang Panahon ng Halimaw; ML; Signal Rock	Denise O’Hara - Mamang; Whammy Alcazaren - Never Tear Us Apart; Keith Deligero - A Short History of a Few Bad Things; Lav Diaz - Ang Panahon ng Halimaw; Alec Figuracion - The Eternity Between Seconds; Carl Joseph Papa - Paglisan; Chito S. Roño - Signal Rock; Erik Matti - Buy Bust; Benedict Mique Jr. - ML; Irene Emma Villamor - Meet Me in St. Gallen
Best Actor Pinakamahusay na Pangunahing Aktor	Best Actress Pinakamahusay na Pangunahing Aktres
Eddie Garcia - ML; Carlo Aquino - Meet Me in St. Gallen; Christian Bables - Signal Rock; Dingdong Dantes - Sid and Aya; Ketchup Eusebio - Mamang; Eddie Garcia - Hintayan ng Langit; Miyuki Kamimura - Tanabata’s Wife; Tony Labrusca - ML; Victor Neri - A Short History of a Few Bad Things; Dante Rivero - Kung Paano Hinihintay ang Dapithapon	Nadine Lustre - Never Not Love You; Ai-Ai de las Alas - School Service; Perla Bautista - Kung Paano Hinihintay ang Dapithapon; Anne Curtis - Buy Bust; Anne Curtis - Sid and Aya; Glaiza de Castro - Liway; Maribeth Fanglayan - Tanabata’s Wife; Celeste Legaspi - Mamang; Iyah Mina - Mamu: And a Mother Too; Bela Padilla - Meet Me in St. Gallen; Marietta "Pokwang" Subong - Oda sa Wala
Best Supporting Actor Pinakamahusay na Pangalawang Aktor	Best Supporting Actress Pinakamahusay na Pangalawang Aktres
Joel Lamangan - School Service; Arjo Atayde - Buy Bust; Nonie Buencamino - Citizen Jake; Teroy Guzman - Citizen Jake; Victor Neri - Buy Bust; Romnick Sarmenta - Kung Paano Hinihintay ang Dapithapon; Lou Veloso - Citizen Jake	Cherie Gil - Citizen Jake; Pinky Amador - Ang Panahon ng Halimaw; Bituin Escalante - Ang Panahon ng Halimaw; Daria Ramirez - Signal Rock; Nova Villa - Miss Granny
Best Screenplay Pinakamahusay na Dulang Pampelikula	Best Cinematography Pinakamahusay na Sinematograpiya
Rody Vera - Signal Rock; Dwein Baltazar - Gusto Kita with All My Hypothalamus; Lav Diaz - Ang Panahon ng Halimaw; Alec Figuracion - The Eternity Between Seconds; Paul Grant - A Short History of a Few Bad Things; Erik Matti and Anton Santamaria - Buy Bust; Benedict Mique Jr. - ML; Irene Emma Villamor - Meet Me in St. Gallen	Neil Bion - BuyBust; Neil Daza - Signal Rock; Nap Jamir - Tanabata's Wife; Larry Manda - Ang Panahon ng Halimaw; Pao Orendain - Meet Me in St. Gallen; Sasha Palomares - Never Tear Us Apart; Rommel Sales - The Eternity Between Seconds
Best Production Design Pinakamahusay na Disenyong Pamproduksyon	Best Editing Pinakamahusay na Editing
Michael Espanol & Roma Regala - BuyBust; Popo Diaz - Ang Panahon ng Halimaw; Roy Lachica - Goyo: The Boy General; Martin Masadao - Mamang; Mark Sabas - Signal Rock; Aped Santos - Liway; Thesa Tang - Never Tear Us Apart	May-i Guia Padilla - Tanabata's Wife; Gerone Centeno & Tom Estrera - Citizen Jake; Keith Deligero & Maria Estela Paiso - A Short History of a Few Bad Things; Alec Figuracion - The Eternity Between Seconds; Jay Halili - BuyBust; Carlo Francisco Manatad - Meet Me in St. Gallen; Carlo Francisco Manatad - Sid and Aya; Carlo Francisco Manatad - Signal Rock; Mikael Angelo Pestano - ML
Best Music Pinakamahusay na Musika	Best Sound Pinakamahusay na Tunog
Malek Lopez & Erwin Romulo - BuyBust; Jake Abella - Aria; Pearlsha Abubakar - ML; Jamaar Ajero, et al. - A Short History of a Few Bad Things; Kurt Alalag, May-i Guia Padilla & Mark Tan - Tanabata's Wife; Teresa Barrozo - Mamang; Teresa Barrozo - Paglisan; Malek Lopez & Erwin Romulo - Never Tear Us Apart	Jonathan Hee, Steff Dereja & Miguel Hernandez - Never Tear Us Apart; Aian Caro, Lamberto Casas, Jr. & Albert Michael Idioma - ML; Jason Conanan, Daryl Libongco & Mikko Quizon - Meet Me in St. Gallen; Whannie Dellosa & Steven Vesagas - BuyBust; Albert Michael Idioma - Signal Rock; Rico Mambo & Angeli Sarmiento - A Short History of a Few Bad Things
Best Short Film Pinakamahusay na Maikling Pelikula	Best Documentary Pinakamahusay na Dokyumentaryo
Tembong (Connecting) - Shaira Advincula; Last Order - Joji Villanueva Alonso; Baguio Address No. 10 - Mervine Aquino; Pamati-I Bala Ang Akon Ihutik Nga Binalaybay (Listen to the Poems I Will Whisper) - Elvert Bañares; Inday - Lawrence Fajardo; Pulangui - Bagane Fiola; 'Wag Mo 'Kong Kausapin - Joseph Gacutan; Manila is Full of Men Named Boy - Andrew Stephen Lee; To Remain is To Have Been Left - Pam Miras; Palabas - Arjanmar Rebeta; Siyudad sa Bulawan (City of Gold) - Jarell Serencio	Sa Palad ng Dantaong Kulang - Jewel Maranan; Dancing Manilenyos - Patrick Alcedo; Ang Pag-ukit sa Paniniwala - Hiyas Baldemor Bagabaldo; Pagkatapos ng Tigkiwiri - Daniel Madrid; Beastmode: A Social Experiment - Manuel Mesina III; Call Her Ganda - PJ Raval; All Grown Up - Wena Sanchez

== Special award ==
=== Natatanging Gawad Urian ===
- Gloria Sevilla

== Multiple nominations and awards ==
Films that received multiple nominations
Nominations	Film
10	Buybust
9	Signal Rock
8	ML
7	A Short History of a Few Bad Things
7	Ang Panahon ng Halimaw
7	Meet Me in St. Gallen
5	Never Tear Us Apart
5	Tanabata's Wife
4	The Eternity Between Seconds
4	Mamang
3	Kung Paano Hinihintay ang Dapithapon
3	Sid & Aya (Not a Love Story)
2	Paglisan
2	School Service
2	Liway

Films that won multiple awards
Awards	Film
4	Buybust
