= 2019 FAMAS Awards =

Awarding ceremony given by the Filipino Academy of Movie Arts and Sciences

67th FAMAS Awards
- Date: April 28, 2019
- Site: Meralco Theater, Pasig, Metro Manila, Philippines
- Hosted by: Xian Lim
- Produced by: Megavision Integrated Resources
- Directed by: Dennis Marasigan

Highlights
- Best Picture: Gusto Kita With All My Hypothalamus
- Most awards: Gusto Kita With All My Hypothalamus (3)

Television coverage
- Network: Cinema One

The 67th Filipino Academy of Movie Arts and Sciences (FAMAS) Awards was an awarding ceremony given by the Filipino Academy of Movie Arts and Sciences (FAMAS), an organization composed of prize-winning writers and movie columnists, giving recognition to the Philippine mainstream and independent films, actors, actresses, directors and production staffs for their achievements in the year 2018.

The awards night was held at the Meralco Theater, Pasig, Metro Manila on Sunday, April 28, 2019.

The film Gusto Kita With All My Hypothalamus garnered the most wins with three including Best Picture and Best Director. Nadine Lustre took home the Best Actress award for the film Never Not Love You, while Eddie Garcia and Victor Neri shared the Best Actor trophy for their respective films: ML and A Short History Of A Few Bad Things.

== Awards ==
=== Major Awards ===
Winners are listed first and highlighted with boldface.

Best Picture	Best Director
**Gusto Kita with All My Hypothalamus**; 1st Place: Grand Jury Prize: Ang Panahon ng Halimaw; 2nd Place: Grand Jury Prize: Fisting: Never Tear Us Apart; Ang Dalawang Mrs. Reyes; Ang Panahon ng Halimaw; A Short History Of A Few Bad Things; Dog Days; Goyo: Ang Batang Heneral; Kung Paano Siya Nawala; Never Not Love You; Fisting: Never Tear Us Apart; Oda Sa Wala	**Dwein Baltazar - Gusto Kita with All My Hypothalamus**; Whammy Alcazaren - Fisting: Never Tear Us Apart; Dwein Baltazar - Oda Sa Wala; Lav Diaz - Ang Panahon ng Halimaw; Timmy Harn - Dog Days; Erik Matti - BuyBust; Joel Ruiz - Kung Paano Siya Nawala; Jerrold Tarog - Goyo: Ang Batang Heneral
Best Actor	Best Actress
**Eddie Garcia - ML**; **Victor Neri - A Short History of A Few Bad Things**; Alwyn Uytingco - Asuang; Carlo Aquino - Exes Baggage; JM de Guzman - Kung Paano Siya Nawala; Dante Rivero - Kung Paano Hinihintay Ang Dapithapon; James Reid - Never Not Love You; Mon Confiado - El Peste; Christian Bables - Signal Rock; Daniel Padilla - The Hows of Us; Ybes Bagadiong - Dog Days	**Nadine Lustre - Never Not Love You**; Judy Ann Santos - Ang Dalawang Mrs. Reyes; Gabby Padilla - Billie & Emma; Perla Bautista - Kung Paano Hinihintay Ang Dapithapon; Angelica Panganiban - Exes Baggage; Glaiza de Castro - Liway; Iyah Mina - Mamu, And a Mother Too; Sarah Geronimo - Miss Granny; Marietta Subong - Oda Sa Wala; Anne Curtis - Sid & Aya: Not a Love Story
Best Supporting Actor	Best Supporting Actress
**Joem Bascon - Double Twisting Double Back**; Publio Briones III - A Short History of a Few Bad Things; Levi Ignacio - BuyBust; Arjo Atayde - BuyBust; Teroy de Guzman - Citizen Jake; Gabby Eigenmann - Citizen Jake; Soliman Cruz - Gusto Kita With All My Hypothalamus; Menggie Cobarrubias - Kung Paano Hinihintay Ang Dapithapon; Richard “Ebong” Joson - Liway; Arron Villaflor - Mamu, And a Mother Too; Nanding Josef - Signal Rock	**Adrienne Vergara - Dog Days**; Shaina Magdayao - Ang Panahon ng Halimaw; Hazel Orencio - Ang Panahon ng Halimaw; Bituin Escalante - Ang Panahon ng Halimaw; Pinky Amador - Ang Panahon ng Halimaw; Cherie Gil - Citizen Jake; Daria Ramirez - Signal Rock; Agot Isidro - Kung Paano Siya Nawala; Mary Joy Apostol - Hospicio; Cielo Aquino for Billie & Emma
Best Original Screenplay	Best Adapted Screenplay
**Gusto Kita With All My Hypothalamus - Dwein Baltazar**; A Short History of a Few Bad Things - Paul Grant; Ang Dalawang Mrs. Reyes - Jun Lana and Elmer Gatchalian; Ang Panahon ng Halimaw - Lav Diaz; Ang Pangarap Kong Holdap - Marius Talampas; Asuang - Carl Papa, Rayn Brizuela, and Lawrence Nicodemus; Oda Sa Wala - Dwein Baltazar; Signal Rock - Rody Vera; So Connected - Jason Paul Laxamana	**Tanabata’s Wife - Charlson L. Ong, Choy Pangilinan, Mao Portus, and Juan Carlos Tarobal based on the short story by Sinai Hamada**; Alimuom - Keith Sicat based on his graphic novel Outerspace Filipino Workers; Hintayan ng Langit - Juan Miguel Severo based on his one-act play; Miss Granny - Jinky Laurel based on the 2014 Korean film written by Shin Dong-ik, Hong Yoon-jeon and Dong Hee-seon; Para sa Broken Hearted - Rinka Sycip based on the novel by Marcelo Santos II
Best Cinematography	Best Production Design
**Oda sa Wala - Neil Daza**; Gusto Kita With All My Hypothalamus - Neil Daza; BuyBust - Neil Bion; Goyo: Ang Batang Heneral - Pong Ignacio; Never Not Love You - Mycko David; Fisting: Never Tear Us Apart - Sasha Palomares; Pan De Salawal - Tey Clamor; Dog Days - Albert Banzon and Jippy Pascua; Tanabata’s Wife - Nap Jamir	**Oda sa Wala - Maolen Fadul**; BuyBust - Michael Espanol and Roma Regala; El Peste - Richard Somes; Goyo: Ang Batang Heneral - Roy Lachica; Kung Paano Hinihintay Ang Dapithapon - Marielle Hizon; Pan De Salawal - Alvin Francisco; The Hows of Us - Norico Santos; Unli Life - Ericsson Navarro; Fisting: Never Tear Us Apart - Thesa Tang
Best Editing	Best Sound
**Pag-ukit sa Paniniwala - Hiyas Baldemor Bagabaldo**; **Kung Paano Siya Nawala - Lawrence S. Ang**; A Short History of a Few Bad Things - Maria Estela Paiso and Keith Deligero; BuyBust - Jay Halili; Dog Days - John Torres and Mervine Aquino; Double Twisting Double Back - Apol Dating; Fisting: Never Tear Us Apart - Ilsa Malsi; Oda Sa Wala - Dwein Baltazar; Gusto Kita With All My Hyporthalamus - Ilsa Malsi	**Ang Panahon ng Halimaw - Corinne de San Jose**; BuyBust - Whannie Dellosa; Goyo: Ang Batang Heneral - Albert Michael Idioma; Gusto Kita With All My Hypothalamus - Axel Fernandez; Musmos Na Sumibol Sa Gubat Ng Digma - Alan Caro; We Will Not Die Tonight - Immanuel Verona
Best Musical Score	Best Visual Effects
**Fisting: Never Tear Us Apart - Erwin Romulo, Malek Lopez**; Dog Days - Sewage Worker/Marcus Adoro; Double Twisting Double Back - Hiroko Nagai and Harold Andre Cruz Santos; Goyo: Ang Batang Heneral - Jerrold Tarog; Meet Me in St. Gallen - Emerzon Texon; Melodrama/Random/Melbourne - Fergus Cronkite; Tanabata’s Wife - Kurt Alalag, Ma-I Guia Padilla, and Marc Tan	**Goyo: Ang Batang Heneral - Blackburst, Inc**; Alimuom - Dennis Rejoy, John Vincent Suarez; BuyBust - Gem Garcia, Ernest Villanueva & UpprGrnd Aurora Mothership, Inc
Best Original Song	Best Short Film
**"Buhay Teatro" by Teresa Barrozo, Christela Marquez, Aica Ganhinhin, Carl Papa, and Erika Estacio - Paglisan**; "Mula sa Ilalim ng Lupa" by Lav Diaz - Ang Panahon ng Halimaw; "Akala" by Marion Aunor - The Day After Valentine’s; "Isa pang Araw" by Miguel Mendoza - Miss Granny; "Ikaw" by Lloyd Oliver and Tiny Corpuz - Paglisan; "Sa’yo Na" by Emerzon Texon - Rainbow's Sunset; "Heartbeats" by Chris Valera and Alessandra De Rossi - Sid & Aya: Not a Love Story	**Siyudad sa Bulawan (City of Gold) - Jarell Serencio**; Grand Jury Prize: Balai (Home) - Klarisse Purugganan; Baguio Address No. 10 - Mervine Aquino; Manila is full of Men Named Boy - Andrew Stephen Lee; ‘Wag Mo kong kausapin (Please Stop Talking) - Josef Gacutan; Gabi ng Kababalaghan (Mysteries of the Night) - Stephen Lopez; Pulangui - Bagane Fiola; Tembong (Connecting) - Shaira Advincula; Sa Among Agwat (In Between Spaces) - Don Senoc; Madugo ang Gabi - Alex Torres
Best Documentary Film
**All Grown Up** - Wena Sanchez; Call Her Ganda - PJ Raval; Pag-ukit Sa Paniniwala - Hiyas Baldemor Bagabaldo

=== Special awards ===
Comedy King Dolphy Memorial Award

- Maricel Soriano

FAMAS Lifetime Achievement Award

- Marilou Diaz-Abaya
- Laurice Guillen
- Charo Santos-Concio

Fernando Poe, Jr. Award

- Anne Curtis

German Moreno Youth Achievement Award

- Maymay Entrata
- Bianca Umali
