= Danes Lee =

Filipina actress

Danielle Lee or simply Danes Lee (born October 24, 1987) is a Filipina actress.

== Personal life and acting career ==
Danes Lee or Danielle Lee is the younger sister of model and TV personality Divine Lee. She started out with TV5, where she was launched as one of the leads in the aborted local version of the Hollywood hit series “Pretty Little Liars.”

After the series was shelved, Danes decided to focus on her studies although she continued to accept modeling gigs from time to time. With her towering and leggy frame, not a few people see her as beauty queen material. Although very close to her sister, Danes is determined to make a name for herself in the acting field.

== Filmography ==
Television

Year	Title	Role
2017	Destined to Be Yours	Clarissa
2014	Wattpad Presents	Astrid
