= On Vodka, Beers and Regrets =

2020 film by Irene Emma Villamor

- Theatrical release poster
- Directed by: Irene Villamor
- Written by: Irene Emma Villamor
- Produced by: Vincent Del Rosario
- Starring: Bela Padilla; JC Santos
- Cinematography: Pao Orendain
- Edited by: Arnex Nicolas
- Music by: “Mundo” by Raphiel Shannon
- Distributed by: Viva Films
- Release date: February 5, 2020
- Running time: 94 minutes
- Country: Philippines
- Language: Filipino
- Box office: ₱80 million

On Vodka, Beers and Regrets is a 2020 Philippine romantic drama film directed and written by Irene Emma Villamor and starring Bela Padilla and JC Santos. This story is about an alcoholic 20-something who keeps on sabotaging herself, and a guy who makes a valiant effort to help her. The film was theatrically released on February 5, 2020.

== Plot ==
Jane (Bela Padilla) was a successful actress as a child and through her teenage years. However, after being involved in a scandal with another actor, her career had been on the wane. Since then, she would always take refuge under the influence of alcohol, which caused her to make destructive decisions in love and career. One day, while having another drinking binge in a bar, she was noticed and befriended by Brisom frontman Francis (JC Santos) who then helped her get through that night, and several other nights to follow.

== Cast ==
- Bela Padilla as Jane
- JC Santos as Francis
- Matteo Guidicelli as Ronnie
- Kean Cipriano as Sam
- Rio Locsin
- Jasmine Hollingworth as Kelly
- Danita Paner

== Production ==
According to Bela Padilla, she called Irene on the phone and told her that she wanted to make a movie again with her. This will serve as their third collaboration in a film after Camp Sawi and Meet Me in St. Gallen.

== Release ==
The film was theatrically released in the Philippines on February 5, 2020.
