= Only We Know =

2025 romantic drama film by Irene Emma Villamor

- Theatrical release poster
- Directed by: Irene Emma Villamor
- Written by: Irene Emma Villamor
- Produced by: Elma S. Medua
- Starring: Dingdong Dantes; Charo Santos-Concio
- Cinematography: Pao Orendain
- Edited by: Benjamin Tolentino
- Music by: Len Calvo
- Production companies: ABS-CBN Film Productions; Cornerstone Studios; AgostoDos Pictures; 7K Entertainment
- Distributed by: Star Cinema
- Release date: June 11, 2025
- Running time: 100 minutes
- Country: Philippines
- Language: Filipino

Only We Know is a 2025 Philippine romantic drama film written and directed by Irene Emma Villamor. Starring Dingdong Dantes and Charo Santos-Concio, with Shamaine Buencamino, Al Tantay, Max Collins, and Rafa Siguion-Reyna in supporting roles, the film revolves around an unlikely friendship between a retired English teacher and a recently widowed structural engineer.

Produced by Star Cinema, Cornerstone Studios, AgostoDos Pictures, and 7K Entertainment, the film was theatrically released on June 11, 2025. It was also released on Netflix on October 9, 2025.

== Synopsis ==
Betty, a retired English teacher, develops an unlikely friendship with Ryan, a structural engineer in his 40s who is grieving the unexpected death of his wife, as she navigates the quiet uncertainty of life after work. Is their growing friendship only a lifeline as they deal with loneliness, social rejection, and their own emotional scars, or will it also show them a sort of love they didn't realize they needed?

== Cast ==
=== Main Cast ===
- Dingdong Dantes as Ryan Sliva
- Charo Santos-Concio as Elizabeth "Betty" Guevarra, a retired professor

=== Supporting role ===
- Shamaine Buencamino as Cora, Betty's best friend
- Al Tantay as William, Betty's ex-husband
- Max Collins as Sofia Monasterio Silva, Ryan's wife who died
- Rafa Siguion-Reyna as Noel, Ryan's friend
- Joel Saracho as Bert, Cora's husband
- Soliman Cruz as Judge Manolo "Ling" Soriano
- Johnny Revilla as Gene Silva, Ryan and Leo's father
- Isabel Oli as Dana
- Gil Cuerva as Leo Silva, Ryan's younger brother
- Ysh Bruce as Camille, Leo's partner

== Production ==
Known by its working title as Love After Love, principal photography was commenced on April 24, 2024. According to filmmaker Irene Emma Villamor, she said that her friends suggested pairing Dingdong Dantes, with whom she last collaborated in Sid & Aya: Not a Love Story in 2018, and Charo Santos-Concio in a film project.

== Reception ==
=== Critical reception ===
Stephanie Mayo, writing for Daily Tribune, rated the film 4 out of 5 stars and gave a positive review, saying that the film "resonates because it centers on our inherent need for connection and shows how some relationships resist labels" and felt the attraction between two characters as "magnetic". She also gave praise to the acting performances of Charo and Dingdong, where they "do not generate heat, but their scenes together hum with something steady and true", and Irene Villamor's direction, which she directs the film in a restrained way.
