= Irene Emma Villamor =

Filipino film director

- Education: University of the Philippines Diliman - Film Institute
- Occupations: Film-maker, television director, producer, scriptwriter
- Years active: 2011 - present

Irene Emma Villamor is a Filipino independent filmmaker-producer, television director and scripwriter known for her romcom movies including Camp Sawi, Meet Me in St. Gallen, Sid & Aya: Not a Love Story, On Vodka, Beers and Regrets, Five Breakups and a Romance, Only We Know and The Loved One.

== Early life and education ==
Villamor grew up in Zambales and would often visit her relatives in Mandaue City, Cebu. Her mother worked overseas which prompted her to move and live with her relatives in Cagayan de Oro. Irene's father died when she was 9 years old.

In college, she studied Bachelor Degree in Filmmaking at the University of the Philippines Diliman - Film Institute.

== Career ==
Villamor started her career as apprentice of Director Joyce Bernal's and became assistant director and writer for the movies Of All the Things (2012) and Everything About Her (2016) while trying to complete her filmmaking degree at University of the Philippines Diliman.

Her first featured film was Relaks, It's Just Pag-ibig (2014) which Villamor wrote and co-directed with Director Antoinette Jadaone.

In 2016, she directed and wrote her first solo movie, Camp Sawi.

== Filmography ==
=== Movies ===
Year	Title	Role	Ref.
2000	Kailangan Ko'y Ikaw	Production Assistant	
2001	Buhay Kamao	Crowd Director	
2001	Pagdating ng Panahon	Crowd Director	
2002	Ikaw Lamang Hanggang Ngayon	Script Supervisor	
2003	Till There Was You	Crowd Director	
2004	All My Life	Crowd Director	
2004	Now That I Have You	Crowd Director	
2005	Camiling Story	Assistant Director	
2006	Don't Give Up on Us	Script Continuity	
2006	All About Love	Script Supervisor	
2008	For the First Time	Assistant Director	
2011	Six Degrees of Separation from Lilia Cuntapay	2nd Assistant Director - a Coffee Shop Customer	
2011	Segunda Mano	Assistant Director	
2012	Kimmy Dora and the Temple of Kiyeme	Assistant Director	
2012	Of All the Things	Assistant Director	
2013	Bakit Hindi Ka Crush ng Crush Mo?	Writer - Assistant Director	
2013	10,000 Hours	1st Assistant Director	
2014	Relaks, It's Just Pag-ibig	Co-director - writer	
2014	That Thing Called Tadhana	Story Consultant	
2014	Separados	Assistant Director	
2014	Da Possessed	Assistant Director	
2015	All You Need Is Pag-ibig	Second Unit Assistant Director	
2016	Camp Sawi	Director - writer	
2016	Everything About Her	Assistant Director - Screenplay	
2016	The Super Parental Guardians	Second Unit Director	
2017	Fangirl Fanboy	Screenplay	
2017	All of You	Creative producer	
2017	Gandarrapiddo! The Revenger Squad	Second Unit Director	
2018	Meet Me in St. Gallen	Director - writer	
2018	Sid & Aya: Not a Love Story	Director - writer	
2018	Fantastica	Second Unit Director	
2019	Ulan	Director - writer	
2019	Alone / Together	Assistant Director	
2020	On Vodka, Beers and Regrets	Director - writer	
2020	Hayop Ka!	Creative Consultant	
2020	Magikland	Script Consultant	
2021	Ikaw at ako at ang ending	Director - writer	
2022	366	Creative producer	
2022	Us x Her	Creative producer	
2023	Five Breakups and a Romance	Director - writer - Creative Brainstormer - Creative Head	
2023	The Cheating Game	Script Consultant	
2024	Fruitcake	Creative producer	
2024	Uninvited	Creative producer	
2025	The Ride	Creative producer	
2025	Ex Ex Lovers	Creative consultant	
2025	Only We Know	Director - writer	
2026	The Loved One	Director - writer	
2026	Midnight Girls	Director - writer	

=== Television ===
Year	Title	Role	Note	Ref.
2011	Luv Crazy	Director - producer - Associate Producer	1 episode	
2011	I Heart You, Pare!	Assistant Director	76 episodes	
2014-2015	Magpakailanman	Assistant Director - Writer	5 episodes	
2015	Aruga ng Puso	Assistant Director		
2015	Pinagpalang Ama	Assistant Director		
2016	That's My Amboy	Director	68 episodes	
2016	God Gave Me You	Associate Director		
2017	My Love from the Star	2nd Unit Director	13 episodes	
2017	Destined to Be Yours	Director	63 episodes	
2019	Love You Two	Director	104 episodes	
2022	False Positive	Director	19 episodes	
2022	Love You Stranger	Script Consultant	40 episodes	
2020-2023	Almost Paradise	Director	3 episodes	
2015-2023	Magpakailanman	Director	4 episodes	
2023	Cattleya Killer	2nd Unit Director	6 episodes	
2023	Replacing Chef Chico	Creative Head - Producer	8 episodes	
2023	Fast Talk with Boy Abunda	Herself - Guest		
2023	Family Feud	Herself - Guest Player		
2024	Love. Die. Repeat.	Director	53 episodes	
2024-2025	Ang Himala ni Niño	Creative Head	140 episodes	
2026	My Bespren Emman	Creative Head		
2026-2026	Juan and Lily Run for SK	Creative Producer		
