= 100 Tula para kay Stella =

2017 film by Jason Paul Laxamana

100 Tula Para Kay Stella
- Theatrical release poster
- Directed by: Jason Paul Laxamana
- Written by: Jason Paul Laxamana
- Produced by: Vic R. Del Rosario Jr.; Vincent G. Del Rosario III; Veronique Del Rosario-Corpus
- Starring: Bela Padilla; JC Santos
- Cinematography: Rommel Sales
- Edited by: Mai Calapardo
- Music by: Paulo Protacio
- Production company: Viva Films
- Distributed by: Viva Films
- Release date: August 16, 2017
- Running time: 122 minutes
- Country: Philippines
- Language: Filipino
- Box office: ₱100 million

100 Tula Para Kay Stella (lit. '100 Poems for Stella') is a 2017 Philippine romantic film written and directed by Jason Paul Laxamana. It stars Bela Padilla and JC Santos. The film revolves around a college student who tries to create 100 poems which are dedicated to Stella, a woman who aspires to become a well-known rock star.

Produced and distributed by Viva Films, the film was theatrically released on August 16, 2017, as part of the 1st Pista ng Pelikulang Pilipino. A sequel entitled 100 Awit Para Kay Stella, was released in 2025.

== Synopsis ==
In 2004, Fidel Lansangan (JC Santos) and Stella Puno (Bela Padilla) meet each other as freshmen college students in Pampanga pursuing a bachelor's degree in psychology. They became friends despite differences in their personalities; Fidel is an honor student with a speech impediment and loves poetry while Stella is a rocker with a tough and confident attitude who prefers to jam with her band rather than to do her studies.

Fidel begins to write poems to express his love to Stella but does not have the confidence to read these to her. Stella on her had various boyfriends as she pursues her goal of securing a recording contract. The film's story spans for four whole years of Fidel and Stella's college life and revolves around the question whether Fidel can muster enough confidence to read his poems to Stella.

== Cast ==
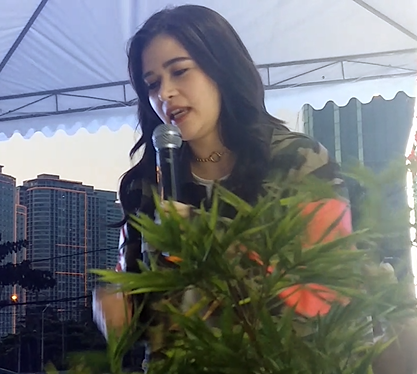
Bela Padilla portrays Stella Puno

- Bela Padilla as Stella Puno
- JC Santos as Fidel Lansangan
- Mayton Eugenio as Danica
- Caleb Santos as Von
- Prince Stefan as Chuck
- Ana Abad Santos as Ms. Bardozo
- Dennis Padilla as Fidel's Dad
- Ronnie Liang as Edmond

== Production ==
100 Tula Para Kay Stella was produced under Viva Films. Jason Paul Laxamana served as both the writer and director of the film. The story of the film was inspired from Laxamana's own life experiences. The script was already finished as early as 2015 when principal photography of the film began.

Scenes were shot in Pampanga for the film.

== Release ==
The film had a theatrical release in the Philippines on August 16, 2017, as one of the twelve official entries at the 2017 Pista ng Pelikulang Pilipino. The film was given a Parental Guidance (PG) rating by the Movie and Television Review and Classification Board.

== Reception ==
=== Box office ===
100 Tula Para Kay Stella garnered millions worth of box office on its opening day on August 16, 2017. By August 18, the film is reportedly the leading film among the twelve entries at the Pista ng Pelikulang Pilipino in terms of box office returns. Viva Films stated on August 21, 2017, that the film has grossed ₱80 million.

=== Critical reception ===
The film was given an "A" rating by the Cinema Evaluation Board.

Fred Hawson in a review published in ABS-CBN News rates the film 6 out of 10. He writes that people expecting for a "lighthearted funny romp" will have their expectation challenged as he finds the film heavy to watch saying that the audience would feel the frustration and pain of the two protagonists of the film. He also expressed his opinion that actual teenagers could have portrayed the lead roles as he finds it "difficult to accept" Santos and Padilla portraying characters who are 17 years old and described their face as "unmistakably more mature" than actual teenagers. He described 100 Tula Para Kay Stella as a "gender switched" version of another film, I'm Drunk, I Love You. He particularly praised the portrayal of Ana Abad Santos for her role as Ms. Bardozo, Fidel and Stella's English teacher. He also acknowledge the efforts of the production designer for their work in the film set some decades ago from the film's release.

== Soundtrack ==
The 2004 hit "Balisong" was recorded by The Juans and served as the theme song of the film. It was originally recorded by Filipino rock band Rivermaya from their 2003 album Between the Stars and Waves.

== Sequel ==
In January 2020 direct Jason Paul Laxamana confirmed and announced that 100 Tula Para Kay Stella is having a sequel. On October 7, 2024, plans for the a sequel was affirmed with the upcoming film given the title 100 Awit Para Kay Stella with Padilla and Santos reprising their roles. Release of the film will be on September 10, 2025.
