= The Day After Valentine's =

Filipino romantic film

- Theatrical release poster
- Directed by: Jason Paul Laxamana
- Written by: Jason Paul Laxamana
- Produced by: Vicente G. del Rosario III
- Starring: Bela Padilla; JC Santos; Regine Tolentino
- Cinematography: Rommel Sales
- Edited by: Mai Calapardo
- Music by: Paulo Protacio
- Production company: Viva Films
- Distributed by: Viva Films
- Release date: 15 August 2018
- Running time: 108 minutes
- Country: Philippines
- Language: Filipino
- Box office: ₱7.4 million

The Day After Valentine's is a 2018 Philippine romantic film written and directed by Jason Paul Laxamana starring Bela Padilla and JC Santos. The film was released by Viva Films on 15 August 2018 as one of the official entries of the Pista ng Pelikulang Pilipino.

== Plot ==
Kai, a self-destructive man meets Lani, a cheerful and independent young woman at a clothing shop where she works for an extended night shift. At the fitting room, Lani accidentally pulls the curtain opens exposing Kai shirtless body, she notices the cuts on his arms from self-harm. Intrigued by it, she invites Kai for a dinner. Eventually the two becomes friends. Soon after, Lanie takes the responsibility of helping him moves on from a painful break up.

== Cast ==
- Bela Padilla as Lani
- JC Santos as Kai
- Regine Tolentino
- Jay Castillo as Jordan
- Stacey Gabriel as Mandy
- Phoebe Villamor
- Rayton Lamay
- Merwyn Abel
- Aries Go
- Gabby Eigenmann
- Liza Lorena as Ninang Celestina
- Cheska Iñigo
- Lauren Young

=== Main cast ===
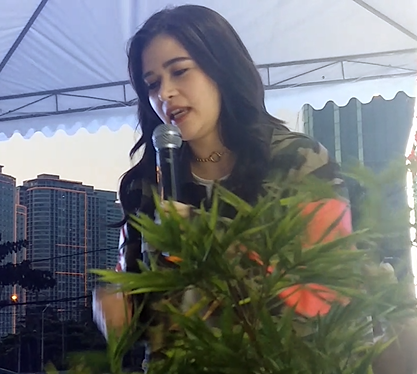
Bela Padilla portrays Lani

== Summaries ==
Lani and Kai meet and become friends. Bela Padilla as Lani, is a store assistant while JC Santos as Kai, is a young man who is having a hard time moving and fixing his life after a breakup. They spend Valentine's Day. His mother lives in Lanai. When Kai needs to go home to Hawaii, he invites Lani to come with him with his family.
