= Love. Die. Repeat. =

2024 Philippine television drama series

- Title card
- Genre: Drama; Romantic fantasy
- Written by: Obet Villela; Geng Delgado; Jake Somera
- Directed by: Irene Emma Villamor; Jerry Lopez Sineneng
- Creative director: Aloy Adlawan
- Starring: Jennylyn Mercado; Xian Lim
- Theme music composer: Roxanne E. Fabian
- Opening theme: "Lisan" by Jennylyn Mercado
- Country of origin: Philippines
- Original language: Tagalog
- No. of episodes: 53

Production
- Executive producers: Racquel Atienza-Cadsawan; Mary Joy L. Pili
- Cinematography: Edgardo Jacinto; Juan Lorenzo Orendain III
- Editors: Vincent Valenzuela; Noel Mauricio
- Camera setup: Multiple-camera setup
- Running time: 19–28 minutes
- Production company: GMA Entertainment Group

Original release
- Network: GMA Network
- Release: January 15 – March 27, 2024

Love. Die. Repeat. is a 2024 Philippine television drama romance fantasy series broadcast by GMA Network. Directed by Irene Emma S. Villamor and Jerry Lopez Sineneng, it stars Jennylyn Mercado and Xian Lim. It premiered on January 15, 2024 on the network's Prime line up. The series concluded on March 27, 2024, with a total of 53 episodes.

The series is streaming online on YouTube.

== Premise ==
Angela loses her husband, Bernard in a car accident. Afterwards, she will discover she is experiencing a time loop – reliving the day her husband dies.

== Cast and characters ==
Cast

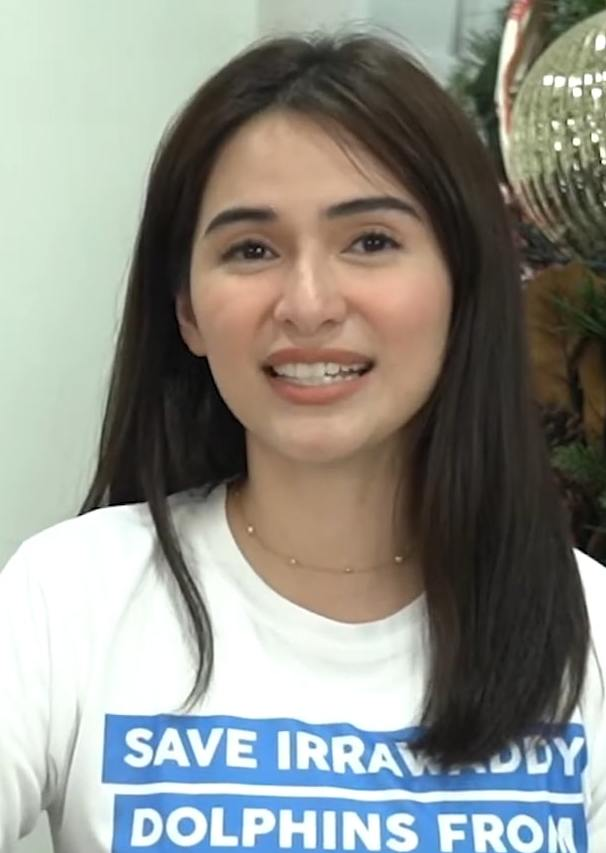
Jennylyn Mercado

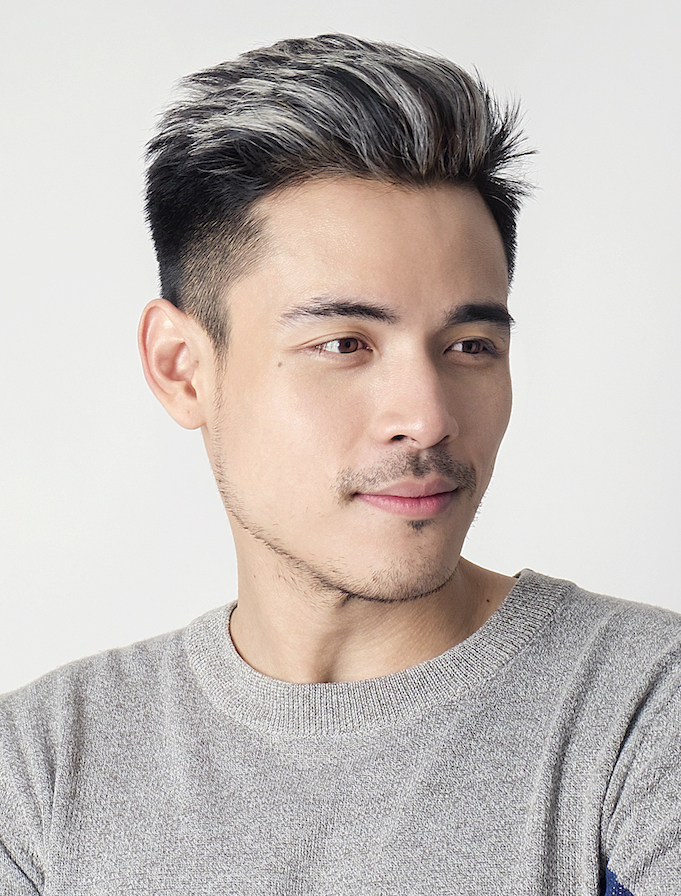
Xian Lim

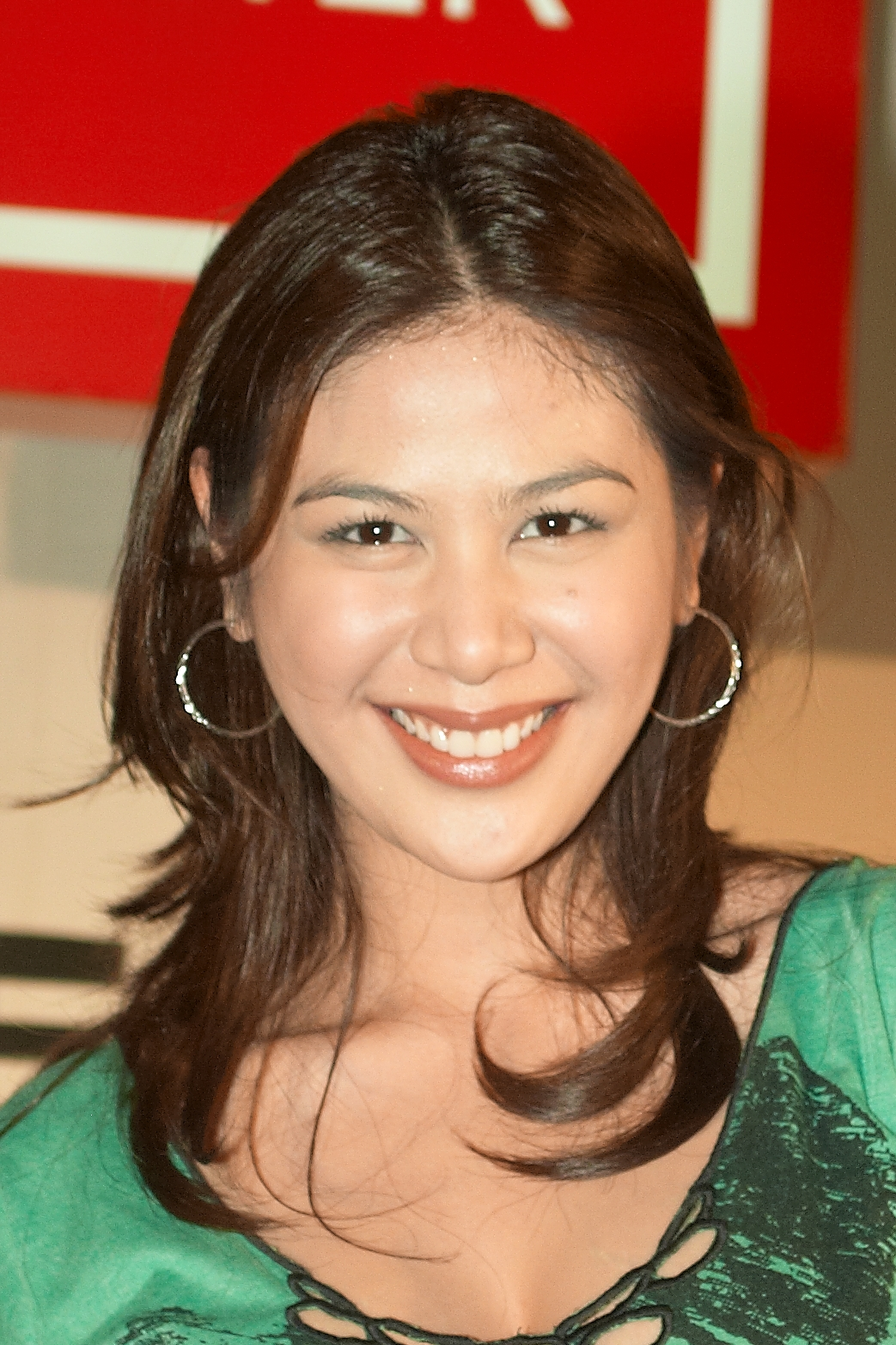
Valerie Concepcion

Lead cast

- Jennylyn Mercado as Angela Zafra-Yuzon
- Xian Lim as Bernardo "Bernard" Yuzon

Supporting cast

- Valeen Montenegro as Chloe Exekiel
- Mike Tan as Elton Villaforte
- Nonie Buencamino as Danilo Zafra
- Samantha Lopez as Florencia "Florence" Zafra
- Valerie Concepcion as Gretchen Macalintal
- Ina Feleo as Jessica "Jessie" Ledesma
- Malou de Guzman as Kanlaon
- Shyr Valdez as Hilda Yuzon
- Victor Anastacio as Isaac
- Ervic Vijandre as Jerome Sandoval
- Faye Lorenzo as Diane

== Episodes ==
Love. Die. Repeat. episodes
No.	Title	Original release date
1	"Pilot"	January 15, 2024
2	"Bernard and Angela"	January 16, 2024
3	"Birthday Gift"	January 17, 2024
4	"Death of Bernard"	January 18, 2024
5	"It Was Just a Dream"	January 19, 2024
6	"Umuulit na Araw" (transl. repeating day)	January 22, 2024
7	"Pagluluksa ng Ina" (transl. mourning of mother)	January 23, 2024
8	"Baby ni Angela" (transl. baby of Angela)	January 24, 2024
9	"Elton's Revenge"	January 25, 2024
10	"Huling Pagkakataon" (transl. last chance)	January 26, 2024
11	"Angela Saves Bernard"	January 29, 2024
12	"Elton vs. Bernard"	January 30, 2024
13	"New Chapter"	January 31, 2024
14	"Lipstick and Kiss"	February 1, 2024
15	"Chloe's Secret"	February 2, 2024
16	"Boracay Boylet"	February 5, 2024
17	"Holding On"	February 6, 2024
18	"Confrontation"	February 7, 2024
19	"Sisihan" (transl. blaming)	February 8, 2024
20	"Temptation"	February 9, 2024
21	"Hinala ni Angela" (transl. hunch of Angela)	February 12, 2024
22	"Missing Watch"	February 13, 2024
23	"Chloe's Scheme"	February 14, 2024
24	"Liar Liar"	February 15, 2024
25	"Berard Resigns"	February 16, 2024
26	"Bistado" (transl. caught)	February 19, 2024
27	"CCTV"	February 20, 2024
28	"Rocky Relationship"	February 21, 2024
29	"Danilo vs. Bernard"	February 22, 2024
30	"Same Dress"	February 23, 2024
31	"Halik" (transl. kiss)	February 26, 2024
32	"Wedding Ring"	February 27, 2024
33	"Paghaharap" (transl. confrontation)	February 28, 2024
34	"Friendship Over"	February 29, 2024
35	"You're Fired!"	March 1, 2024
36	"Giving Up"	March 4, 2024
37	"Babala ni Kanlaon" (transl. warning of Kanlaon)	March 5, 2024
38	"Pasabog ni Chloe" (transl. surprise of Chloe)	March 6, 2024
39	"It's Over"	March 7, 2024
40	"Dobleng Sakit" (transl. double pain)	March 8, 2024
41	"Accident"	March 11, 2024
42	"Behind Bars"	March 12, 2024
43	"I Still Love You"	March 13, 2024
44	"Forgiveness"	March 14, 2024
45	"Pagbabalik" (transl. return)	March 15, 2024
46	"Pagtanggap" (transl. acceptance)	March 18, 2024
47	"Fugitive"	March 19, 2024
48	"Behind You"	March 20, 2024
49	"Nakatotoo" (transl. came true)	March 21, 2024
50	"There's a Chance"	March 22, 2024
51	"Bigo si Bernard" (transl. Bernard is disappointed)	March 25, 2024
52	"Third Chance"	March 26, 2024
53	"Finale"	March 27, 2024

== Casting ==
In August 2021, actress Kim Domingo was replaced by Myrtle Sarrosa after contracting SARS-CoV-2. Actor Gardo Versoza and Sarossa were originally planned to appear in the series, and later were replaced by Nonie Buencamino and Valeen Montenegro respectively.

== Production ==
Principal photography commenced in September 2021. Production was halted in the same month, due to actress Jennylyn Mercado's medical emergency. Filming resumed in April 2023 and concluded on November 11, 2023.

== Ratings ==
According to AGB Nielsen Philippines' Nationwide Urban Television Audience Measurement People in television homes, the pilot episode of Love. Die. Repeat. earned a 7.9% rating. The final episode scored a 9.5% rating.

== Accolades ==
Accolades received by Love. Die. Repeat
Year	Award	Category	Recipient	Result	Ref.
2025	36th PMPC Star Awards for Television	Best Drama Actress	Jennylyn Mercado	Pending	
