= The Loved One (2026 film) =

2026 romantic drama film by Irene Villamor

- Theatrical release poster
- Directed by: Irene Emma Villamor
- Written by: Irene Emma Villamor
- Produced by: Vincent Del Rosario III; Valerie S. Del Rosario; Veronique Del Rosario-Corpus
- Starring: Anne Curtis; Jericho Rosales
- Cinematography: Pao Orendain
- Edited by: Benjamin Tolentino
- Music by: Len Calvo
- Production companies: Cornerstone Studios; Viva Films
- Distributed by: Viva Films
- Release date: February 11, 2026 (Philippines)
- Running time: 102 minutes
- Country: Philippines
- Languages: Filipino; English
- Box office: ₱300 million

The Loved One is a 2026 Philippine romantic drama film written and directed by Irene Emma Villamor. The film stars Anne Curtis and Jericho Rosales. Produced by Cornerstone Studios and Viva Films, it was theatrically released in Philippine cinemas on February 11, 2026.

== Premise ==
The film tells the story of two former lovers who cross paths again after a long separation. A teaser for the film depicts the characters recalling their past relationship, which included a "fun night out" and various dates. The characters are shown as older versions of themselves, with dialogue suggesting a 10-year gap since their time together.

== Cast ==
- Anne Curtis as Ellie
- Jericho Rosales as Eric
- Catriona Gray as Nicole
- Jackie Lou Blanco as Evelyn
- Joyce Burton as Lucy
- Luis Alandy as Greg
- Max Eigenmann as Kyla
- Mari Kaimo as Ted
- Ian Pangilinan as Edward
- Ara Davao as Ethel
- Kit Thompson as Jim
- Mike Quinzon as Dennis

== Production ==
=== Development ===
The film is directed by Irene Villamor. It is produced by Cornerstone Studios and Viva Films. This project marks the reunion of Anne Curtis and Jericho Rosales, who last worked together on the 2011 television series Green Rose. Their last film project together was Baler in 2008.

Speculation about a reunion project began in April 2024 when Curtis posted a photo on Instagram showing herself having dinner with Rosales and Villamor. The caption of the photo read "When like minds collide." In September 2025, Curtis confirmed in an interview that she would work on a love story with Villamor. Rosales also mentioned in a November interview that he would work with Curtis.

=== Filming ===
Principal photography for the film took place in 2025. Rosales posted a photo of the script on social media in August 2025 to mark the beginning of work on the project. Reports indicated that filming wrapped up on the same month as his announcement.

== Release ==
The first teaser trailer for The Loved One was released on December 30, 2025, by Cornerstone Entertainment and Viva Films. As part of ongoing efforts to help revive cinema attendance for Philippine films, Viva Films announced a special ticket pricing scheme for The Loved One, offering reduced ticket prices across Philippine theaters nationwide. The film was released in Philippine theaters on February 11, 2026.

== Reception ==
=== Box office ===
The Loved One earned 95 million pesos on its first 7 days according to Viva Films. By its ninth day in theaters, the film has grossed ₱110 million, becoming the first Filipino film of 2026 to cross 100 million pesos.

On June 18, 2026, during a media conference by Viva Entertainment, it was revealed that the film had grossed more than ₱300 million.
