= Last Night (2017 film) =

- Directed by: Joyce Bernal
- Screenplay by: Bela Padilla
- Story by: Bela Padilla; Neil Arce
- Produced by: Charo Santos-Concio; Malou N. Santos; Papa P; Erick Raymundo; Joyce Bernal; Neil Arce; Boy 2 Quizon; Nikolo Juban
- Starring: Piolo Pascual; Toni Gonzaga
- Cinematography: Boy Yñiguez
- Edited by: Joyce Bernal; Beng Bandong
- Music by: Emerzon Texon
- Production companies: Star Cinema; Spring Films; N^{2} Productions
- Distributed by: Star Cinema
- Release date: September 27, 2017
- Running time: 103 minutes
- Country: Philippines
- Language: Filipino

Last Night is a 2017 Philippine psychological drama romance film directed by Joyce Bernal, starring Piolo Pascual and Toni Gonzaga. The film follows the story of Mark and Carmina, both hopeless in their lives, intertwined by one fateful night on Jones Bridge when both of them fail to commit suicide. This film is a co-production between Star Cinema, Pascual's Spring Films, and Bernal's film production company, N^{2} Productions.

== Synopsis ==
Mark (Pascual) and Carmina (Gonzaga) find each other at the most desperate moments of their lives. Mark, a businessman, has lost his will to live, while Carmina, a wide-eyed young girl, has given up on life. As Mark is about to jump off Jones Bridge, he hears Carmina calling for help; her blouse is stuck as she tries to end her life in the river below. Mark rescues her, and they form a bond, helping each other brainstorm creative ways to die. Despite their initial intentions, their shared experiences and failed attempts at ending their lives lead them to fall deeply in love. However, they find it difficult to abandon their original plans, caught between their growing affection for each other and their desire to escape their pain.

As time went on, Carmina took Mark to her brother's restaurant, where Mark slowly regained his will to live. When Mark confessed his love to Carmina, she suddenly walked out on him, leaving his question of whether she truly loved him unanswered.

Carmina promises Mark they'll meet again at the church where they first spent nights together. At the church, Mark learns from the regular elderly ladies that one of them had died and could see Carmina in her final days, assuring her peaceful passing. Mark revisits the places he and Carmina had been, discovering he checked into a hotel alone, despite booking separate rooms. In his room, he finds his shirt, which he used to cover Carmina, neatly folded.

Out of options, Mark heads to the restaurant and uncovers a shocking truth: Carmina is one of many aliases, and her real name is Jennifer. Her brother reveals that Jennifer had a lover named Bobby, a journalist and revolutionist. Bobby's reckless actions led to his death at Jones Bridge, leaving Jennifer devastated. Unable to live without him, she ended her life by jumping from the bridge. Her soul, unable to pass on, became the guardian of the bridge, preventing further deaths.

Mark jumps off Jones Bridge again that night, but Jennifer's soul rescues him once more, showing him visions of the future if he were to succeed in killing himself. These visions convince Mark to change his ways and improve his life, inspired by Jennifer's intervention.

Eventually, Mark's problems disappear, and he resolves to find Jennifer one last time before leaving for Canada. He buys a bouquet of white roses for her soul to rest in peace. They bid their farewells, with Jennifer encouraging Mark to continue living. As rain falls at Jones Bridge and the sun rises, Jennifer's spirit slowly fades, and Mark's will to live becomes stronger.

== Cast ==
=== Main cast ===
- Piolo Pascual as Mark Peters
- Toni Gonzaga as Carmina Salvador / Jennifer Reyes

=== Supporting cast ===
- Joey Marquez as Ricardo "Mang Rick" Reyes
  - Cholo Barreto as young Rick
- Patrick Sugui as Leonard
- Blaine Mendoza as Carmina's mother
- China Juban as Mark's wife
- Margie Moran as Mark's mother
- Lou Veloso as Old man in LRT Station

== Production ==
=== Development ===
Actress and writer Bela Padilla wrote the story for this film, as well as the screenplay with Neil Arce.

=== Production ===
Boy Yñiguez, the cinematographer of the highest-grossing Filipino independent film Kita Kita was also the cinematographer of this film.

Principal photography was done at several places in Manila. Among the shooting locations in the city are Jones Bridge, Luneta Hotel, as well as in the Casa Manila restaurant.

== Release ==
The film was released exclusively in the Philippines on September 27, 2017.
