= BuyBust =

2018 film by Erik Matti

- Theatrical release poster
- Directed by: Erik Matti
- Screenplay by: Anton Santamaria; Erik Matti
- Story by: Erik Matti
- Produced by: Erik Matti; Ronald Stephen Monteverde; Vicente G. del Rosario III; Veronique Del Rosario; Agung Bagus
- Starring: Anne Curtis; Brandon Vera; Victor Neri; Arjo Atayde; Levi Ignacio; Nonie Buencamino; Lao Rodriguez; Alex Calleja; Joross Gamboa; Sheenly Gener; Mara Lopez; AJ Muhlach; Tarek El Tayech; Maddie Martinez; Ricky Pascua; Nafa Hilario; Ian Ignacio; Mikey Alcaraz
- Cinematography: Neil Derrick Bion
- Edited by: Jay Halili
- Music by: Erwin Romulo; Malek Lopez
- Production companies: Viva Films; Reality Entertainment
- Distributed by: Viva Films
- Release dates: June 29, 2018 (NYAFF); August 1, 2018 (Philippines)
- Running time: 126–128 minutes
- Country: Philippines
- Language: Filipino
- Budget: ₱86 million (US$1.6 million)
- Box office: ₱97 million

BuyBust (stylized as BUYBUST) is a 2018 Philippine action thriller film co-written and directed by Erik Matti. It stars an ensemble cast top-billed by Anne Curtis and Brandon Vera. The plot centers on a team summoned by the Philippine Drug Enforcement Agency (PDEA) to conduct a drug bust in a Manila slum. Realizing the mission is poorly executed, the team find themselves trapped by settlers and attempts to escape by fighting their way out. The film has been viewed as a social commentary on the controversial Philippine drug war initiated by the Duterte government.

Production on Matti's "first full-on action film" began in 2016, and Curtis and Vera were cast as leads the following year. On a budget of ₱86 million, principal photography began in March 2017. The film premiered at the New York Asian Film Festival (NYAFF) on June 29, 2018, had a wide Philippine release on August 1 and a limited North American release on August 10. Critical reception to the film was generally favorable, attaining praise for its action scenes, theme, technical aspects and Curtis' against-type performance, but was often criticized for its similarities with the 2011 Indonesian film The Raid. It grossed ₱97 million worldwide.

== Plot ==
Due to the Philippine drug war, most of the country's barangays have been drug free. Drug dealer Teban is interrogated by Detective Dela Cruz and Detective Alvarez, trying to find out the location of big-time drug lord Biggie Chen. Upon learning that Chen is hiding at the Barangay Gracia ni Maria in Tondo, Manila, the authorities launch a "buy-bust" operation to capture Chen.

Rookie police officer Nina Manigan joins a new anti-narcotic elite squad of the PDEA after surviving the slaughter of her entire former squad in a drug raid compromised by corrupt cops. Her new squad is chosen to conduct the mission against Chen; the entrapment is to take place in Plaza Rajah Sulayman. Teban is used as a bait to lure Chen, but the latter did not appear.

The squad then proceeds to the slums of Gracia and split up into the Alpha and Bravo teams. Inside, Teban meets with Chongki to take him over to Chen. However, the operation was revealed as bait to massacre the PDEA officers. The Bravo team is slaughtered, leaving Dela Cruz as the only survivor. The Alpha team, led by Lacson, fall back but find themselves trapped by slum settlers and drug mafias in which they must fight their way out. Manigan then kills Dela Cruz upon finding out that he is a part of the illegal trade.

Fed up with the relentless operations conducted by authorities, the dwellers of Gracia erupted into a violent riot against the PDEA officers and the drug lords. In the ensuing chaos, Rico, Bernie, Teban, Chongki, Solomon, Manok and hundreds of other civilians are killed amid the riots and the gunfights. In the aftermath, Chen is captured, and Manigan, who ends up as being the sole survivor of her squad, finds out that Detective Alvarez was the one behind the illegal drug trade from Chen. While in police custody, Manigan notices Alvarez talking with someone over the phone regarding "loose ends". After the phone conversation, Alvarez kills Chen; Manigan wrestles for Alvarez' gun then kills him and his men, she shoots her leg on purpose then places the gun on Chen's lifeless body and takes the phone that Alvarez was using for possible evidence. When other PDEA agents ask Manigan what happened, she stated that the Chen "fought back". The film ends with the news stating that "only 13 people" died during the encounter while the camera glides upon hundreds of dead bodies.

== Cast ==
- Anne Curtis as Nina Manigan
- Brandon Vera as Rico Yatco
- Victor Neri as Bernie Lacson
- Arjo Atayde as Biggie Chen
- Nonie Buencamino as Detective Alvarez
- Lao Rodriguez as Detective Dela Cruz
- Alex Calleja as Teban
- Levi Ignacio as Chongki
- Ricky Pascua as Solomon
- Joross Gamboa as Manok

== Production ==
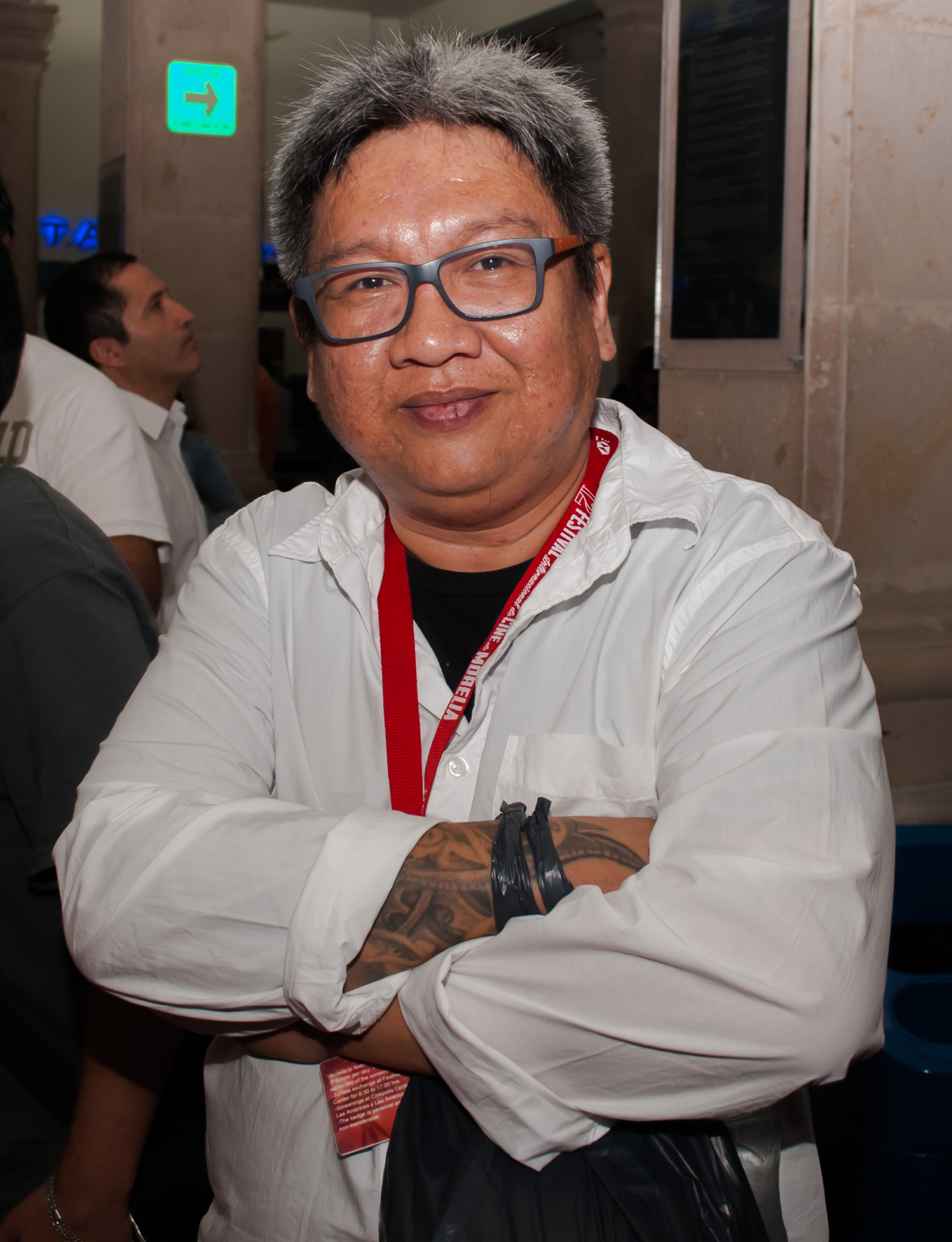
Director Erik Matti

Production on BuyBust began as early as mid-2016 which, according to director Erik Matti, included: "finding a good mix of actors, training, pre-sales, test shoots, storyboards, training, pre-vis, look tests, set construction, training finding the right balance between budget ambition and resources". Matti also wrote the screenplay, which underwent a total of 16 revisions. A co-production of Viva Films and his production company Reality Entertainment, he described the project his "first full-on action film" in recent years.

Anne Curtis and MMA fighter Brandon Vera joined the cast in late June 2016. A week before filming, Curtis performed rigorous training at the Scout Ranger Training School, where she undertook knife fighting in close quarters and basic weapon handling. Curtis was also trained in Pekiti-Tirsia Kali, and running while encumbered with 12 kg (26 lb) of weight. She elected performing most of her stunts by herself. Lawyer Chel Diokno did the voiceover in some of its most crucial scenes.

Principal photography began on March 28, 2017, with Neil Derrick Bion serving as cinematographer. Shooting lasted 56 days, during which a total of 1,278 extras and 309 stuntmen cooperated.

== Themes ==
Journalists write that the film served as a social commentary on the presidency of Rodrigo Duterte and the consequences brought about following his controversial war on drugs. Writing in The Hollywood Reporter, Clarence Tsui said, "BuyBust is another strong Philippine entry seeking to debunk a strongman's promises of retaining social order through violence, which actually breeds irreversible moral corruption, casting every social class asunder." Tsui further writes that "Matti is probably making a point by depicting the masses as a loony army," citing the director's criticism of Duterte as well as his supporters, to whom he cast an inflammatory remark through social media.

== Release ==
At the urging of the producers, Matti submitted the BuyBust script to the 2017 Metro Manila Film Festival, but was rejected in the first tier of the selection process. The executive committee who rejected Matti's script was composed of three new members that were tapped as replacements to those who had resigned due to issues of corruption within the committee. The resignees alleged that the committee favored "putting too much emphasis on commerce over art". Matti denounced the incident on a lengthy Facebook post, in which he argued that the selection process was "rigged" to favor "the powerful personalities controlling the festival". In the wake of the incident, he stated in early July 2017 that he does not intend to submit the finished film, which is the second tier of the selection process.

The film was initially scheduled for a Philippine premiere on February 28, 2018, but was postponed after U.S. distributor Well Go USA acquired the North American rights to the film. The deal was brokered between Well Go USA executive Dylan Marchetti and Nate Bolotin of XYZ Films.

The film had its world premiere at the New York Asian Film Festival on June 29, 2018, and was the venue's closing feature film. It was released in the Philippines on August 1, 2018, and was followed by a limited North American release on August 10. The Cinemalaya Independent Film Festival opened its 14th edition with BuyBust, held on August 4, 2018.

== Reception ==
=== Box office ===
The film grossed $178,471 in the U.S. and Canada, and ₱97 million worldwide.

=== Critical response ===
The film enjoyed good reviews upon its United States theatrical release. Rotten Tomatoes gives a score of 83%, with an average rating of 6.5/10, based on 18 reviews from critics. On Metacritic it received "Generally favorable reviews," with an average rating of 68 out of 100 based on 10 reviews. Members of the Cinema Evaluation Board gave the film an "A" grade.

Foreign and domestic critics praised the film for the intensity of its action scenes, commentary on the Philippine drug war, Anne Curtis' against-type performance, Neil Derrick Bion's cinematography, and Erwin Romulo and Malek Lopez's score. Clarence Tsui, in a positive review for The Hollywood Reporter, described the film as essential viewing on the Philippines where it is "bound to raise a ruckus when it opens" and "likely to captivate audiences". Fred Hawson on ABS-CBN News complimented the film for being "very badass, very hardcore, yet so engrossing and entertaining", and gave it a score of 9 out of 10. Oggs Cruz of Rappler liked Matti's depiction of violence as an attempt to deliver his political message across, "It isn't just a film to be enjoyed for its stunts and astounding set pieces, thrilling and exquisitely choreographed as they are." Rokey Desingaño in Manila Bulletin complimented BuyBust as "first-rate" and credited it with bringing Philippine action films "to another level".

Some critics were less enthusiastic about the film. Stephanie Mayo gave it 1 out of 5 stars in a pan review for the Daily Tribune, criticizing the repetitiveness of the action whose "speedy editing and the shaky cam prevent you from fully enjoying the gore". Rob Hunter of Film School Rejects was similarly critical of the action, which he felt were "surprisingly dull and repetitive" and "won't impress in their choreography, but worse, they disappoint in their execution". Though he praised Curtis and Brandon Vera, Hunter said the film was "too long, too sloppy, and too underwhelming" in general. Andrew Mack in Screen Anarchy criticized the film's derivative set-up and "awkward and clumsy" action choreography: "All of it feels basic and fundamental at best. Any moments of inspiration or coolness, and there are some, are overwhelmed by mediocre execution." Both Hunter and Mack agree that BuyBust place emphasis on "quantity over quality", with the latter concluding: "While it may deliver in volume it is nothing more than just white noise."

== Spinoff sequel ==
A spinoff sequel titled BuyBust: The Undesirables will release as a Netflix series.

== See also ==
- The Raid, a 2011 Indonesian action film with a similar premise
