= Ina Feleo =

Filipino actress, figure skater, dancer, and writer

- Born: Catalina Guillen Feleo; December 29, 1985 (age 40); Manila, Philippines
- Occupations: Actress; dancer; writer; figure skater
- Years active: 2002–present
- Agents: Star Magic (2008–2013); GMA Artist Center (2002–2003; 2010; 2013–present)
- Known for: Hanggang Makita Kang Muli as Odessa / Margaret; Destined to be Yours as Catalina; Raising Mamay as Malou Reyes
- Spouse: Giacomo Gervasutti (m. 2020)
- Parents: Laurice Guillen; Johnny Delgado
- Relatives: Ana Feleo (sister)

Catalina Guillen Feleo-Gervasutti (born December 29, 1985), better known as Ina Feleo, is a Filipino actress, figure skater, dancer, and writer. She rose to fame for playing the main antagonist role as Odessa in the series on GMA Network, Hanggang Makita Kang Muli.

== Biography ==
Catalina Guillen Feleo was born on December 29, 1985, the younger of two daughters of actor Johnny Delgado and director Laurice Guillen after her older sister, Ana. Between the ages of 9 and 16, Feleo trained as a figure skater, originally in the Philippines, but then in USA due to the lack of facilities in the former. Between 2003 and 2008, she was a member of the Bayanihan Dance Company, touring different countries. She graduated from Ateneo de Manila University with a degree in creative writing.

Feleo then moved into films, starting as a dancer, but moving on to speaking roles. By 2007, she had received a "Best Performance of an actress" award at Cinemalaya for her portrayal in the film Endo In 2019, Feleo got engaged to her long-term boyfriend and was married on December 1, 2020.

== Filmography ==
=== Film ===
Year	Title	Role
2010	Miss You Like Crazy	Lianne
2010	Working Girls	Raissa Arnaldo
2010	Senior Year	adult Mitch Veloso
2010	Dalaw	Kylie
2011	Ikaw ang Pag-ibig	Evangeline "Vangie" Cruz
2012	The Healing	Mrs. Mata
2015	The Love Affair	Joyce
2019	Family History	Anna Roque
2022	Family Matters	Glenda
2023	Rewind	Aurora
2026	Silenced Nights	

=== Television ===
Year	Title	Role(s)
2002–2003	Kahit Kailan	Lira (credited as Ynah Feleo)
2002–2003	Side Stitch	
2008	Kung Fu Kids	Sister Mona
2008	Ligaw na Bulaklak	Misty
2008	HushHush	Sarah
2009	Komiks Presents: Nasaan Ka Maruja?	Aimee
2009–2010	Dahil May Isang Ikaw	Nina
2010	Rosalka	Christine
2010	Pilyang Kerubin	Lailani Santos
2010–2011	Noah	Tessa Avila
2011	Guns and Roses	Diana "Dindin" Ventura
2011–2012	Angelito: Batang Ama	Precious
2012	Precious Hearts Romances: Lumayo Ka Man Sa Akin	Karla Cordero-Falcon
2012	Wako Wako	Teresa Calleja
2012–2013	Precious Hearts Romances: Paraiso	Amanda Galang
2013	Kakambal ni Eliana	Almira
2013	Akin Pa Rin ang Bukas	Emma Ignacio
2014	Ang Dalawang Mrs. Real	Lydia San Jose
2014–2015	Yagit	Imelda Macabuhay
2015	Karelasyon: Status Symbol	Mina
2016	Hanggang Makita Kang Muli	Odessa Luna / Margaret
2016	Pepito Manaloto	Magnificent / Maggie
2016	A1 Ko Sa 'Yo	Sarah
2017	Destined to be Yours	Catalina Rosales-Vasquez
2017	Alyas Robin Hood	Rosetta / Liana Madrigal
2018	Hindi Ko Kayang Iwan Ka	Sophia Angeles
2019	The Better Woman	Angela De Villa-Castro
2020–2021	Bilangin ang Bituin sa Langit	Margaux Salcedo-Santos
2021	Heartful Café	Zowie Fulgencio
2021	To Have & to Hold	Raquel "Quel" Asuncion
2022	Raising Mamay	Malou Reyes
2023	Hearts on Ice	Wendy Martinez
2023	Open 24/7	Susan
2024	Love. Die. Repeat.	Jessica "Jessie" Ledesma
2024	Tadhana: Pinaasa	Gina
2024	It's Showtime	Herself / Guest
2025	Prinsesa ng City Jail	Amanda Vivero /Jenny
2025–2026	Encantadia Chronicles: Sang'gre	Lavanea
