= Camp Sawi =

2016 Filipino comedy drama film

- Theatrical release poster
- Directed by: Irene Emma Villamor
- Screenplay by: Irene Villamor
- Story by: Bela Padilla; Neil Arce
- Produced by: Vic del Rosario Jr.
- Starring: Arci Muñoz; Andi Eigenmann; Bela Padilla; Yassi Pressman; Kim Molina; Sam Milby; Dennis Trillo
- Cinematography: Tey Clamor
- Edited by: Chrisel Galeno-Desuasido
- Music by: Len Calvo
- Production companies: Viva Films; N^{2} Productions
- Distributed by: Viva Films
- Release date: August 24, 2016
- Running time: 109 minutes
- Country: Philippines
- Language: Filipino
- Box office: ₱120 million

Camp Sawi (lit. 'Camp Unfortunate') is a 2016 Filipino comedy-drama film starring Andi Eigenmann, Bela Padilla, Yassi Pressman, Kim Molina, Sam Milby and Arci Muñoz. It is written and directed by Irene Villamor. It was released on August 24, 2016, by Viva Films.

== Plot ==
Five women, Gwen (Arci Muñoz), Bridgette (Bela Padilla), Jessica (Yassi Pressman), Clarisse (Andi Eigenmann) and Joanne (Kim Molina) enter a boot camp named Camp Sawi. Each woman had a history of being heartbroken by their romantic interest and the girls as members of the aptly named camp help one another to deal with their ill feelings under the watch of camp chef and head coach Louie (Sam Milby).

== Cast ==
=== Main cast ===
- Bela Padilla as Bridgette "Brij"
- Arci Muñoz as Gwen/Lovejoy
- Andi Eigenmann as Clarisse
- Yassi Pressman as Jessica "Jess"
- Kim Molina as Joan
- Sam Milby as Louie/Camp Master

=== Supporting cast ===
- Jerald Napoles as Pilot / Camp Assistant
- Sarah Pagcaliwagan
- Cholo Barretto

=== Special participation ===
- Dennis Trillo as Chris
- Rico Blanco as Aaron
- Alex Medina as Nelson
- Bret Jackson as Zac
- AJ Muhlach as Randolf
- Tonton Gutierrez as Miguel
- Patrick Sugui as Jess' new boyfriend
- RJ Padilla as Joan's groom
- Regine Tolentino as Jess' mom

== Production ==
Camp Sawi was written and directed by Irene Villamor. The film is a co-production of Viva Films and N^{2} Productions of Joyce Bernal. A significant portion of the film was shot on Bantayan Island of Cebu province. The film is the first full-length film project for Villamor as a director.

According to Bela Padilla, one of the cast of the film, said that the film's focus is on how women deal with moving on from heartbreak.

== Release ==
Camp Sawi premiered on cinemas nationwide on August 24, 2016, which was dubbed by the production team as "National Sawi Day".

== Reception ==
The Cinema Evaluation Board rated Camp Sawi as a Grade A film.
