= Bela Padilla =

Filipino actress (born 1991)

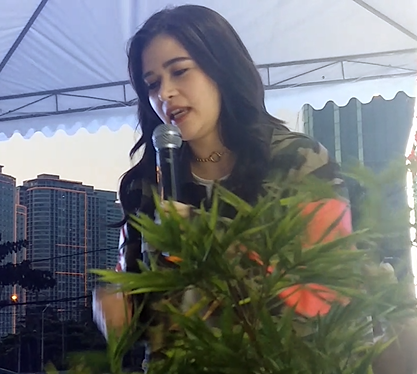
- Padilla performing in 2016
- Born: Krista Elyse Hidalgo Sullivan; May 3, 1991 (age 35); Makati, Metro Manila, Philippines
- Other names: Krista Valle; Krista Sullivan
- Citizenship: Philippines; United Kingdom
- Occupations: Actress; television host; singer; director; writer
- Years active: 2007–present
- Agents: Star Magic (2007–2010; since 2025) Sparkle (2010–2015); Viva Artists Agency (2015–2025)

Krista Elyse Hidalgo Sullivan (born May 3, 1991), known professionally as Bela Padilla (Tagalog pronunciation: [paˈdɪlja]), is a Filipino actress, host, singer, writer, and director.

She is best known for her roles in television dramas on GMA and ABS-CBN, as well as critically acclaimed films such as 100 Tula Para Kay Stella (2017) and Meet Me in St. Gallen (2018). She is also recognized for her performances in The Day After Valentine's (2018) and On Vodka, Beers, and Regrets (2020). In 2022, she made her directorial debut with the film 366, which she also starred in alongside Zanjoe Marudo and JC Santos, produced by Viva Films. Additionally, she wrote the screenplay for Joyce Bernal's film Last Night (2017).

== Early life and background ==
Krista Elyse Hidalgo Sullivan was born to a British father, Cornelius Gary Sullivan, and a Filipina mother, Margarette "Meg" Cariño Hidalgo. Her father was divorced from his first wife. She has three elder half-siblings in England from her father's first marriage, as well as an older brother from both of her parents. She first attended a Montessori-style international school in Forbes Park, Makati, before attending the foreigners' class at Colegio San Agustin – Makati. Padilla took up journalism as an elective in senior high school. Padilla was a classmate of fellow actress Lovi Poe.

Padilla's maternal grandmother is the sister of Eva Cariño-Padilla, wife of actor-director and former Camarines Norte governor Roy Padilla Sr. She is the niece, by second-degree consanguinity, of actors Rommel Padilla, Robin Padilla, and BB Gandanghari, and second cousin to RJ and Daniel Padilla (sons of Rommel), as well as Queenie and Kylie Padilla (daughters of Robin). She is a practicing Jehovah's Witness. Padilla's father, Cornelius, died in August 2023.

== Acting career ==
Padilla was discovered by ABS-CBN talent scout Jet Valle during one of his field trips. Valle introduced her to ABS-CBN, where she joined Star Magic Batch 15 and adopted the stage name "Krista Valle." Her debut television role came in 2007 in the teen drama series Star Magic Presents: Abt Ur Luv Ur Lyf 2. She later changed her stage name to "Krista Sullivan" when she transitioned to a freelance acting career. In 2009, she appeared in a minor role in the TV series Totoy Bato, and shortly after, she became a regular cast member of Lokomoko High on TV5.

In 2010, Padilla left Star Magic, signed with manager Claire dela Fuente, and moved to GMA. With this move, she also adopted the name "Bela Padilla." She starred in the 2011 fantasy series Machete alongside Aljur Abrenica. That same year, she won the Miss Friendship and Media's Darling awards at the 2011 Asian Super Model Contest, held in Guilin and Nanning in the Guangxi Zhuang Autonomous Region of China.

Padilla made headlines in 2012 when her FHM Philippines magazine cover for the March issue was pulled due to accusations of racism. Later that year, she starred in the titular role in the afternoon drama series Magdalena: Anghel sa Putikan. In 2013, she starred opposite Richard Gutierrez in the primetime series Love & Lies.

After a return to ABS-CBN in 2015, Padilla joined the action-packed series FPJ's Ang Probinsyano alongside Coco Martin. Two years later, in 2017, she headlined the drama series My Dear Heart and starred in the romantic film 100 Tula Para Kay Stella, which became the highest-grossing film at the first Pista ng Pelikulang Pilipino. She made her debut as a screenwriter in the film Last Night, which premiered on September 27, 2017, through Star Cinema.

Padilla took the lead role in the 2019 crime drama series Sino ang Maysala?: Mea Culpa. She also starred in the Philippine adaptation of the Korean film Miracle in Cell No. 7, which was an official entry to the 2019 Metro Manila Film Festival. The film went on to earn ₱543 million at the box office, making it one of the highest-grossing Filipino films of all time.

Padilla made her directorial debut with the drama film 366, which premiered on April 13, 2022, on Vivamax. Padilla also starred in the film opposite Zanjoe Marudo.

In 2024, Padilla returned to television as a guest host on the noontime variety show It's Showtime. In October 2024, Padilla was confirmed to reprise her role in a sequel of 100 Tula Para Kay Stella, which was titled 100 Awit Para Kay Stella. The film premiered in September 2025.

== Business ==
In 2020, Padilla is a co-owner of the Seoul-based skincare company, Britory, with business partners DongWoo Kang and WonYoung Ryu.

She launched her beauty business, BELA by Bela, which sells beauty products including lip tints, cheeks tints and lip balms in 2024.

== Personal life ==
Padilla holds dual Filipino and British citizenship, and has several paternal relatives based in London. On November 2021, she revealed that she had relocated to London. She attributed her move to be more productive during the COVID-19 pandemic, as well as to find a sense of security following the nonrenewal of ABS-CBN's franchise.

Padilla was in a relationship with Swiss national Norman Bay. She first introduced him to the public in October 2020 through an Instagram post, in which she captioned, "the one I met in St. Gallen," in reference to her previous movie Meet Me in St. Gallen. In November 2023, she enrolled in an acting course in the Royal Academy of Dramatic Art.

In January 2025, Padilla announced that she had moved back to the Philippines to resume working full-time as an actress, as well as resume scriptwriting. She later shared in August that she and Bay had mutually broken up, largely due to their long-distance relationship and her return to the Philippines; the two remained friends and Bay visited Padilla during the filming of 100 Awit Para Kay Stella. In September 2026, Padilla announced her relationship with tech CEO Martin Tan, but broke up later in the month.

In November 2024, Padilla revealed that she has polyendocrine metabolic ovarian syndrome (PMOS) and hypothyroidism, having been diagnosed when she was 19 years old.

== Filmography ==
=== Film ===
Key
†	Denotes films that have not yet been released

Bela Padilla's film credits with year of release, film titles and roles
Year	Title	Role	Notes	Ref.
2007	Bahay Kubo: A Pinoy Mano Po!	Janet		
2009	BFF (Best Friends Forever)	Mean girl		
2010	You to Me Are Everything	Monique		
2012	My Kontrabida Girl	Evelyn		
2013	10,000 Hours	Maya Limchauco	Co-Writer	
2014	Sa Ngalan ng Ama, Ina at mga Anak	Damian		
2015	Felix Manalo	Honorata de Guzman-Manalo		
2016	Tomodachi	Rosalinda		
2016	Camp Sawi	Bridgette "Brij"	Film producer	
2016	I America	Erica Berry		
2016	The Super Parental Guardians	Emmy Cameo		
2016	Working Beks	Joy		
2017	Luck at First Sight	Diane	Screenwriter	
2017	100 Tula Para Kay Stella	Stella Puno		
2017	Last Night		Writer	
2018	Meet Me in St. Gallen	Celeste / Katy Perry		
2018	The Day After Valentine's	Lanie		
2018	Fantastica	Fairy Godmother	Nonspeaking role, lines delivered through Gus Abelgas' voiceover	
2019	Apple of My Eye		Writer	
2019	Miracle in Cell No. 7	Yesha Gopez (Adult)		
2019	Mañanita			
2020	On Vodka, Beers and Regrets	Jane Pineda		
2022	366	June	Actress, Director, Writer	
2022	The Ultimate Oppa	Yana		
2023	Spellbound	Yuri		
2023	Yung Libro sa Napanood Ko	Lisa	Actress, Director, Writer	
2023	Wish You Were The One	Astrud		
2025	100 Awit Para Kay Stella	Stella Puno		
2025	Rekonek	Trisha	Main role, 51st Metro Manila Film Festival entry	
2026	A Special Memory	Sandra		

=== Television ===
Key
†	Denotes shows that have not yet been aired

Bela Padilla's television credits with year of release, title(s) and role
Year	Title	Role	Notes	Ref.
2008	Star Magic Presents: Abt Ur Luv Ur Lyf 2	Jo	Credited as "Krista Valle"	
2009	Tayong Dalawa	Bar Girl		
2009	Carlo J. Caparas' Totoy Bato	Rain		
2009	Midnight DJ		Guest, Episode: "Higanti ng Kamatayan"	
2009	New Pangarap Kong Jackpot		Episode: "Sa Mundo ng Kahapon"; Credited as "Krista Sullivan"	
2009	Lokomoko High	Herself / Various roles / Betty La Panget		
2009	Maalaala Mo Kaya	Pinky (teenage years)	Episode: "Kalapati"	
2009	Maalaala Mo Kaya	Pinky (teenage)	Episode: "Makinilya"	
2009	Maynila	Isa	Episode: "Makinig Ka, Puso"	
2010	Endless Love	Mayumi 'Yumi' Ramirez		
2011	Pablo S. Gomez's Machete	Aginaya / Rosella		
2011	Maynila	Lea	Episode: "Love's Priority"	
2011	Sisid	Monique		
2012	Hiram na Puso	Vanessa Saavedra / Kara Banaag		
2012	Bubble Gang	Herself - Various roles		
2012	Makapiling Kang Muli	Amber		
2012–2013	Magdalena: Anghel sa Putikan	Magdalena "Lena" Fuentebella / Angela Natividad		
2013	Love and Lies	Denise Salvador-Galvez		
2014	Point of Entry	Analyn Ocampo		
2014	Sa Puso ni Dok	Dr. Gabrielle "Gab" Estrella		
2014	Magpakailanman	Andrea	Episode: "Nakakulong Ang Puso"	
2014	Magpakailanman	Mae	Episode: "Asawa Mo, Hiniram Ko"	
2014	Magpakailanman	Jessa	Episode: "Ang Nurse Na May Ikatlong Mata"	
2015–2016	FPJ's Ang Probinsyano	Carmen Guzman-de Leon		
2016	Ipaglaban Mo	Flora	Episode: "Sanggol"	
2016	Home Sweetie Home	Criselda	Guest	
2017	My Dear Heart	Clara Estanislao-de Jesus		
2017	Maalaala Mo Kaya	Melanie	Episode: "Ice Candy"	
2018	Maalaala Mo Kaya	Karla	Episode: "Fireworks"	
2019	Sino ang Maysala?: Mea Culpa	Julie Iris Miranda / Atty. Juris Agoncillo-Montelibano		
2023; 2024–present	It's Showtime	Herself / Host		
2024	Pamilya Sagrado	Cristine Malonzo	Special Participation	
2025	Maalaala Mo Kaya	Nadia	Episode: "Sim Card"	
2025	Maalaala Mo Kaya	Nadia	Episode: "Bintana"	
2026	Blood vs Duty	Lara Angeles		
2026	Everybody, Sing! season 4	Guest player		

=== Music video appearances ===
Year	Title	Performer	Director	Ref.
2021	Magpahinga	Ben&Ben	Jorel Lising	

== Accolades ==
Year	Work	Award	Category	Result	Ref.
2013	10,000 Hours	Metro Manila Film Festival	Best Actress	Nominated	
2014	10,000 Hours	12th Gawad Tanglaw	Best Supporting Actress	Won	
2014	10,000 Hours	30th PMPC Star Awards for Movies	Movie Supporting Actress of the Year	Nominated	
2014	10,000 Hours	FAMAS Award	Best Supporting Actress	Won	
2016	Felix Manalo	32nd PMPC Star Awards for Movies	Movie Supporting Actress of the Year	Nominated	
2016	Felix Manalo	32nd PMPC Star Awards for Movies	Female Face of the Night	Won	
2016	Felix Manalo	FAMAS Award	Best Actress	Nominated	
2016	FPJ's Ang Probinsyano	6th EdukCircle Awards	Best Drama Actress of the Year (tied with Kim Chiu)	Won	
2018	100 Tula Para Kay Stella	5th Paragala: Central Luzon Media Awards	Best Actress in Film	Won	
2018	100 Tula Para Kay Stella	34th PMPC Star Awards for Movies	Movie Actress of the Year	Nominated	
2018	100 Tula Para Kay Stella	41st Gawad Urian	Best Actress	Nominated	
2019	Meet Me in St. Gallen	42nd Gawad Urian	Best Actress	Nominated	
2019	Sino ang Maysala?: Mea Culpa	33rd PMPC Star Awards for TV	Best Drama Actress	Nominated	
2020	Sino ang Maysala?: Mea Culpa	Seoul International Drama Awards (SDA) 2020	Best Actress	Nominated	
2020	Mañanita	43rd Gawad Urian	Best Actress	Nominated	
2020	Miracle in Cell No. 7	Box Office Entertainment Awards	Movie Supporting Actress of the Year	Won	
2021	On Vodka, Beers and Regrets	44th Gawad Urian	Best Actress	Nominated	
