= Destined to Be Yours =

2017 Philippine television series

- Title card
- Genre: Drama; Romantic comedy
- Created by: Aloy Adlawan
- Written by: Des Garbes-Severino; Renato Custodio Jr.; Kutz Enriquez; Eric Macapugay
- Directed by: Irene Villamor
- Creative director: Roy Iglesias
- Starring: Alden Richards; Maine Mendoza
- Theme music composer: Arlene Calvo
- Opening theme: "Aking Tadhana" by Denise Barbacena
- Ending theme: "To be Yours I'm Destined" by Denise Barbacena
- Country of origin: Philippines
- Original language: Tagalog
- No. of episodes: 63

Production
- Executive producer: Rebya V. Upalda
- Production locations: Metro Manila, Philippines; Quezon, Philippines
- Editors: Virgilio B. Custodio; Rolando dela Merced
- Camera setup: Multiple-camera setup
- Running time: 24–35 minutes
- Production company: GMA Entertainment TV

Original release
- Network: GMA Network
- Release: February 27 – May 26, 2017

Destined to Be Yours is a 2017 Philippine television drama romantic comedy series broadcast by GMA Network. Directed by Irene Emma Villamor, it stars Alden Richards and Maine Mendoza. It premiered on February 27, 2017, on the network's Telebabad line up. The series concluded on May 26, 2017, with a total of 63 episodes.

The series is streaming online on YouTube.

== Premise ==
The story revolves around Benjie and Sinag. When Benjie gets assigned to a job project in Pelangi, he meets Sinag. They both end up falling in love with each other.

== Cast and characters ==
Cast

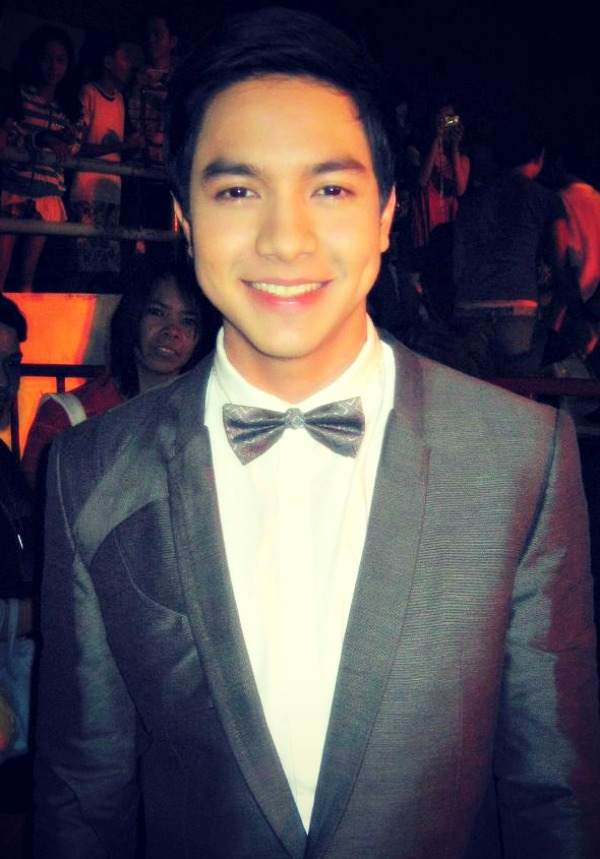
Alden Richards

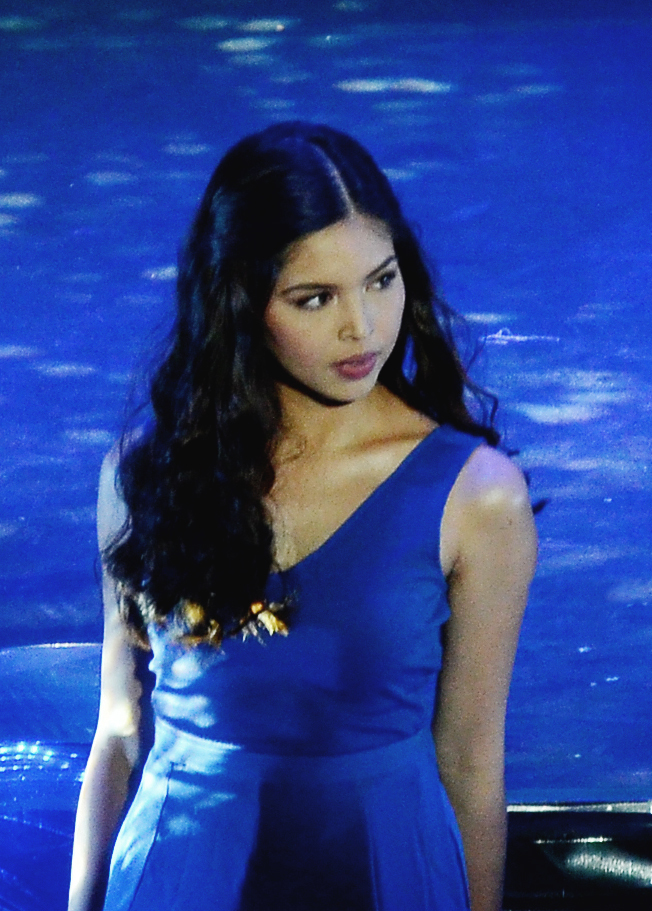
Maine Mendoza

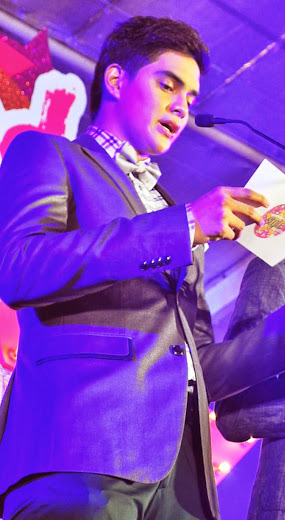
Juancho Triviño.

Lead cast

- Alden Richards as Benjamin "Benjie / Benj" Rosales
- Maine Mendoza as Sinag "DJ Sunshine / DJ Madam Damin" Obispo

Supporting cast

- Boots Anson-Roa as Helen Rosales
- Gardo Versoza as Teddy Obispo
- Lotlot de Leon as Amanda Rosales
- Tommy Abuel as Vicente Rosales III
- Ronnie Henares as Dante Escobar
- Sheena Halili as Ninay Baltazar
- Ina Feleo as Catalina Rosales
- Dominic Roco as Jason Abesamis
- Juancho Triviño as Badong Baltazar
- RJ Padilla as Arman Melendez
- Koreen Medina as Marjorie Escobar
- Janice de Belen as Sally Obispo

Recurring cast

- Will Ashley de Leon as Sol Obispo
- Kim Belles as Tala Obispo
- Ervic Vijandre as Elton Vasquez
- Thea Tolentino as Patricia "Trish" Villanueva
- Jackie Lou Blanco as Ramona Villanueva

Guest cast

- Luz Valdez as Delia
- Lou Veloso as Elvis
- Matthew Mendoza as Gabriel
- Joe Gruta as Doro
- Nova Villa as Puring
- Mark Herras as Eboy
- Marita Zobel as Charito
- Marco Sison as Ka Henry
- Lee Danes as Clarissa
- Nicole Dulalia as Tina
- Tonio Quiazon as Lakay
- Chromewell Cosio as Rex
- Meann Espinosa as Teresing
- Sachi Manahan as Affie
- Sofia Pablo as Lala
- Divine Aucina as Tetay
- Marnie Lapuz as Bem
- Maey Bautista as Mema
- Tammy Brown as Mamaru
- Kim Rodriguez as Fiona
- James Teng as James

== Ratings ==
Destined to Be Yours ratings
No.	Original air date	AGB Nielsen NUTAM
1	February 27, 2017	22.5%
2	February 28, 2017	20.6%
3	March 1, 2017	18.4%
4	March 2, 2017	20.9%
5	March 3, 2017	19.1%
6	March 6, 2017	20.2%
7	March 7, 2017	20.9%
8	March 8, 2017	20.1%
9	March 9, 2017	20.7%
10	March 10, 2017	20.8%
11	March 13, 2017	
12	March 14, 2017	
13	March 15, 2017	
14	March 16, 2017	
15	March 17, 2017	
16	March 20, 2017	
17	March 21, 2017	
18	March 22, 2017	
19	March 23, 2017	
20	March 24, 2017	
		AGB Nielsen NUTAM People
21	March 27, 2017	9.8%
22	March 28, 2017	10.6%
23	March 29, 2017	10.3%
24	March 30, 2017	10.6%
25	March 31, 2017	10.4%
26	April 3, 2017	10.0%
27	April 4, 2017	10.4%
28	April 5, 2017	11.0%
29	April 6, 2017	10.9%
30	April 7, 2017	10.5%
31	April 10, 2017	11.6%
32	April 11, 2017	11.1%
33	April 12, 2017	10.0%
34	April 17, 2017	9.7%
35	April 18, 2017	11.2%
36	April 19, 2017	10.3%
37	April 20, 2017	10.9%
38	April 21, 2017	9.3%
39	April 24, 2017	9.4%
40	April 25, 2017	10.1%
41	April 26, 2017	9.5%
42	April 27, 2017	9.6%
43	April 28, 2017	9.2%
44	May 1, 2017	9.9%
45	May 2, 2017	9.2%
46	May 3, 2017	9.8%
47	May 4, 2017	10.1%
48	May 5, 2017	10.2%
49	May 8, 2017	9.4%
50	May 9, 2017	10.4%
51	May 10, 2017	9.2%
52	May 11, 2017	9.9%
53	May 12, 2017	9.5%
54	May 15, 2017	9.7%
55	May 16, 2017	9.3%
56	May 17, 2017	9.9%
57	May 18, 2017	9.6%
58	May 19, 2017	10.0%
59	May 22, 2017	9.9%
60	May 23, 2017	9.3%
61	May 24, 2017	10.0%
62	May 25, 2017	9.9%
63	May 26, 2017	10.8%

== Development ==
In August 2016, Alden Richards stated that their series with Maine Mendoza was in the works. GMA Films President, Annette Gozon-Abrogar said that the upcoming series was the network's "top priority". She further mentioned that the long process was due to the several concepts being submitted and was in need of approval by the management of both Richard and Mendoza, GMA Artist Center and Triple A respectively.

The story conference happened on December 12, 2016, at the GMA Executive Lounge, in which the show's title and the director were revealed. The cast, production team and GMA Network's executives were present at the conference.

== Production ==
Principal photography commenced on December 21, 2016, in Quezon.
