= Season of the Devil =

2018 film

- Film poster
- Tagalog: Ang Panahon ng Halimaw
- Directed by: Lav Diaz
- Written by: Lav Diaz
- Produced by: Bianca Balbuena; Lav Diaz; Quark Henares; Bradley Liew
- Starring: Piolo Pascual
- Cinematography: Larry Manda
- Edited by: Lav Diaz
- Music by: Lav Diaz
- Production companies: Epicmedia; Sine Olivia Pilipinas; Globe Studios
- Release dates: February 20, 2018 (Berlinale); May 28, 2018 (Philippines)
- Running time: 234 minutes
- Country: Philippines
- Language: Filipino

Season of the Devil (Filipino: Ang Panahon ng Halimaw) is a 2018 Filipino musical film directed by Lav Diaz. Billed as a "rakopera" (a Filipinization of "rock opera"), it was selected to compete for the Golden Bear in the main competition section at the 68th Berlin International Film Festival. It won the Grand Jury Prize for Film in the 2019 Filipino Academy of Movie Arts and Sciences (FAMAS) Awards. The film has a running time of 234 minutes. It won Best Picture at the 58th International Film Festival of Cartagena de Indias, Gems Section.

== Plot ==
Lorena (Shaina Magdayao) is a young doctor who opens a clinic for the poor in a remote Philippine village in the late 1970s. The village is controlled and terrorized by uniformed armed men, which the prologue of the film identifies as members of the Martial Law era Civilian Home Defense Forces.

Lorena disappears without a trace, prompting her husband Hugo (Piolo Pascual), an activist, poet, and teacher, to come looking for her. Hugo comes to the village and comes face to face with a community "shattered by despotism and violence."

== Cast ==
- Piolo Pascual as Hugo Haniway
- Shaina Magdayao as Lorena Haniway
- Bituin Escalante as Kwentista
- Pinky Amador as Kwago
- Bart Guingona as Paham
- Hazel Orencio as Teniente
- Joel Saracho as Ahas
- Angel Aquino as Anghelita
- Lilit Reyes
- Don Melvin Boongaling
- Noel Sto. Domingo
- Ian Lomongo
- Junjie Delfino

== Reception ==
=== Critical reception ===
On review aggregator website Rotten Tomatoes, the film has an approval rating of 100% based on nine reviews, and an average rating of 7.7/10. Metacritic assigned the film a weighted average score of 73 out of 100, based on 5 critics, indicating "generally favorable reviews".

Variety praised the director for remaining "emphatically his own artist, whether to exhilarating or punishing effect," saying the movie has some "raw, stirring interludes." It however thought that Diaz's editing weakened the film's impact, saying "it’s hard not to wonder what finer rhythmic and tonal variations another editor… might have brought to the table this time."

The Hollywood Reporter called the film a "seething critique about the Philippines’ current trigger-happy president in the form of a 'rock opera.'"

=== Accolades ===
Season of the Devil won best film in the Gems section of 58th Festival Internacional de Cine Cartagena de Indias held in Colombia in March 2018.

The film led the 2019 FAMAS Awards with the most number of nominations, including nods for best picture and best director, and four for best supporting actress for Shaina Magdayao, Bituin Escalante, Pinky Amador, and Hazel Orencio. It won the award for best sound for sound designer Corinne de San Jose and was given the Grand Jury Prize for Film, an honor it shared with Whammy Alazaren's Never Tear Us Apart.

== See also ==
- List of films about martial law in the Philippines
- Civilian Home Defense Forces
