= Nonie Buencamino =

Filipino actor

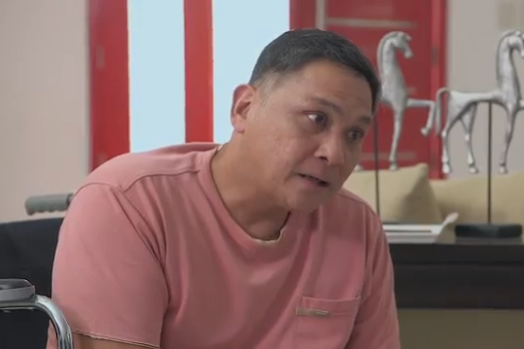
- Buencamino in 2017
- Born: Anthony Buencamino; November 28, 1966 (age 59); Manila, Philippines
- Other name: Noni Buencamino
- Education: Ateneo de Manila University
- Occupation: Actor
- Years active: 1990–present
- Agent: Freelancer (1990–present)
- Television: ABS-CBN; GMA Network; TV5 Network
- Spouse: Shamaine Centenera (m. 1990)
- Children: 4 (including Julia)

Anthony Buencamino, known professionally as Nonie Buencamino (born November 28, 1966), is a Filipino character actor known for his television and theater work. He is strongly associated with Philippine New Wave Cinema, playing roles such as Mayor Bartolome in Jun Lana's Barber's Tales and Felipe Buencamino in Jerrold Tarog's Heneral Luna.

In 2026, Buencamino joining the cast of GMA’s Hari ng Tondo marks another major on-screen reunion with Primetime Action Hero Ruru Madrid, following their prominent roles in the hit action-adventure series Lolong: Bayani ng Bayan.

== Early life and education ==
Buencamino joined Tanghalang Ateneo as a college student and decades later fondly remembered his start with the company.

== Career ==
He portrayed the real-life historical figure Felipe Buencamino (a distant ancestor) in Jerrold Tarog’s critically acclaimed film Heneral Luna (2015) and its sequel Goyo: Ang Batang Heneral (2018). He won a Young Critics Circle Best Performance award for the indie marriage drama Dagitab (2014) and earned massive audience praise for his role as Francisco in the Metro Manila Film Festival hit Family Matters (2022).

== Personal life ==
He is a grandnephew of seminal Kundiman composer Francisco Beltran Buencamino Sr. and the brother of composer Nonong Buencamino. He is a descendant of Felipe Buencamino. He married actress Shamaine Centenera-Buencamino, and the couple had four children, including actresses Delphine and the late Julia Buencamino.

== Filmography ==
=== Film ===
Year	Title	Role
1994	Massacre Files	
1994	Nag-Iisang Bituin	
1994	Sibak: Midnight Dancers	Dave
1995	Patayin sa Sindak si Barbara	Bidoy
1995	Costales	Lt. David
1995	Nena	Bren
1996	Ama, Ina, Anak	Leo
1996	Mulanay	Elvis
1996	Kahit Kailan	
1997	Rizal sa Dapitan	Pio Valenzuela
1997	Milagros	Ramonito
1997	Kahit Minsan Lang	Gardo
1997	Calvento Files: The Movie	Morales
1998	Magandang Hatinggabi	Killer / Fatman
1998	José Rizal	Elias
1999	Still Lives	Enteng
2000	Tunay Na Mahal	
2000	Lagarista	Tiyo Joaquin
2000	Ex-Con	Lt. Tan
2000	Ping Lacson: Super Cop	Police Senior Superintendent Francisco Zubia
2001	Mila	Nato
2001	La Vida Rosa	Oca
2001	Bagong Buwan	Musa
2002	Alyas Bomba Queen	Peping
2002	Small Voices	Fidel
2003	Noon at Ngayon: Pagsasamang Kay Ganda	Robert
2004	Feng Shui	Louie
2005	Maging Akin Muli	Fr. Paul
2005	Shake, Rattle & Roll 2k5	Sael
2006	Batad: Sa Paang Palay	Amang Bunio
2007	Ataul: For Rent	Boy Kagaw
2009	Boy	Boy's father
2011	Aswang	Eddie
2011	A Mother's Story	Gerry Santos
2012	Mga Kidnapper ni Ronnie Lazaro	
2013	Alfredo S. Lim (The Untold Story)	Moises
2014	Barber's Tales	Mayor Bartolome
2015	Heneral Luna	Felipe Buencamino
2016	Everything About Her	JJ
2016	The Woman Who Left	Magbabalot
2017	Smaller and Smaller Circles	Fr. Gus Saenz
2017	Ang Larawan	Manolo Marasigan
2018	Meet Me in St. Gallen	Jesse's father
2018	Citizen Jake	Judge Resti
2018	Distance	Anton
2018	Miss Granny	Ramoncito Malabaño
2018	Goyo: Ang Batang Heneral	Felipe Buencamino
2019	Alone/Together	Alwyn
2019	Maledicto	Domingo Villacorte
2019	Sunshine Family	Don
2019	Family History	Ding
2019	Clarita	Mayor Lacson
2019	When Sadness Lingers	Alfred
2022	Family Matters	Kiko
2024	Ikaw pa rin Pipilin ko	Danny
2024	Pushcart Tales	Jack
2024	Green Bones	Supt. Delos Santos
2024	Un/Happy for You	Jun
2024	Uninvited	Elmer Gatdula
2025	Out of Order	Atty. David Roman
2025	Sana Sinabi Mo	

=== Television ===
Year	Title	Role
1990	Sic O'Clock News	Himself
1990–1991	Ula, ang Batang Gubat	Ronald
1991–1992	Lovingly Yours, Helen	Various
1992	Alab	Miguel
1992–1993	Da Buena Familia	Larry
1993–1995	Malayo Pa Ang Umaga	Denver
1993	Noli Me Tangere	Albino
1994	Batong Buhay	Augusto
1994–1995	Tropang Trumpo	Himself
1996	Bayani	Anacleto del Rosario
1996	Mukha ng Buhay	Emilio
1997–1998	Ikaw na Sana	Gardo
1999–2001	Saan Ka Man Naroroon	Arsenio Madrigal
2002–2003	Habang Kapiling Ka	Javier
2004	Sarah the Teen Princess	
2005	Ikaw ang Lahat sa Akin	Larry Fontanilla
2005–2006	Etheria: Ang Ikalimang Kaharian ng Encantadia	Bartimus
2006	Encantadia: Pag-ibig Hanggang Wakas	Bartimus
2007	Lupin	Arsenio Lupin
2007	Komiks Presents: Pedro Penduko at ang mga Engkantao: Sigben	Amo
2007–2008	Prinsesa ng Banyera	Joel Burgos
2007–2008	Mars Ravelo's Lastikman	Danny
2007–2008	Sine Novela: Pasan Ko ang Daigdig	Efren
2008	Kahit Isang Saglit	Francisco Santillan Sr.
2008	Ligaw na Bulaklak	Dennis
2009	Jim Fernandez's Kambal sa Uma	Raul Perea Sr.
2009	Zorro	Dr. De los Reyes / Caballero #4
2009	Sine Novela: Kung Aagawin Mo ang Lahat sa Akin	Don Gilbert Andrada
2010	Noah	Gideon
2010	Tanging Yaman	Apolinario "Apol" Dimaguiba
2011	Pablo S. Gomez's Machete	Carlos
2011	Carlo J. Caparas' Bangis	Don Aguila
2011–2012	Glamorosa	Oscar Evangelista
2011–2012	Ikaw ay Pag-Ibig	Efren
2012	Walang Hanggan	Miguel Ramos
2012	Precious Hearts Romances Presents: Hiyas	Biano
2013	Carlo J. Caparas' Dugong Buhay	Simon Bernabe
2013–2014	Honesto	Cleto
2014	Ikaw Lamang	Calixto Dela Cruz
2014	Pure Love	Jake's scheduler
2015	My Faithful Husband	Lorenz Dela Paz
2015	Magpakailanman: Ang Huling Yakap sa Nawalang Anak	Robert
2015	Oh My G!	Emmanuel Diaz
2015–2016	Ningning	Iking Sylvestre
2016	Karelasyon	Filbert
2016	My Super D	Pablo Mateo
2016	FPJ's Ang Probinsyano	Roberto Homer "Scarface" Dimayuga
2016–2017	The Greatest Love	Peter Alcantara
2017	The Better Half	Marco's biological father
2017	Love is...	Roman
2017	Magpakailanman: Anak Kong Hindi Akin: The Joel and Noelle Marcaida Story	Bong
2018	Ipaglaban Mo: Haciendero	Attorney Calderoin
2018	Asintado	Salvador Del Mundo
2018	Maalaala Mo Kaya: Red Lipstick	Ruben
2019	The General's Daughter	BGen. Gregorio "Greg" Maximillano
2019	Maalaala Mo Kaya: Steak	Deciderio Go
2020	Almost Paradise (season 1)	Ike Ocampo
2020	Magpakailanman: Walang Iwanan: The Layug Family Story	Rainier
2020	Maalaala Mo Kaya: Notebook	Layot Amaro
2021	Tadhana: Online Sabong	Felipe
2021	Maalaala Mo Kaya: Loving to Care	Abe
2021	Huwag Kang Mangamba	Simon Advincula
2022	Maalaala Mo Kaya: Bisikleta	Eduardo
2022	Magpakailanman: Ampon Man sa Iyong Paningin: The Jane Magbanua Story	Jerry
2022	Jose and Maria's Bonggang Villa	Mang Kadyo
2023	Magpakailanman: Pinsalang ng Tikbalang	Omeng
2024	Love. Die. Repeat.	Danilo Zafra
2024	FPJ's Batang Quiapo	Marcelo Macaraig†
2025	Lolong: Bayani ng Bayan	Nando
2025	Magpakailanman: Ang Inang walang Puso	Buntoy
2025–2026	Totoy Bato	Father Nico Monte
2026	Magpakailanman: Reunited in Love: The Fredmoore and Jennifer Delos Santos Story	Alfredo
2026	Hari ng Tondo	

=== Web series ===
Year	Title	Role
2019	Call Me Tita	Steve Hontiveros
2023	Cattleya Killer	Raffy Canete
2023	Almost Paradise (season 2)	Ike Ocampo

=== Theatre ===
Year	Title	Role	Notes	Ref.
2005	Palasyo ni Valentin	Valentin	PETA Theatre	
2012	Stageshow		Tanghalang Pilipino's 3rd theater season offering staged from October 10 to 21 at the Cultural Center of the Philippines Tanghalang Aurelio Tolentino (CCP Little Theater)	
2013	The King and I	King Mongkut		
2016	Dirty Old Musical	Spanky	Spotlight Artists Centre's original Filipino musical is about fictional 80s boy band ‘The Bench Boys’ who find themselves in a room together after 30 years	
2019	The Kundiman Party	Senator Juancho Valderama	cultural-political drama, written by Floy Quintos and directed by Dexter Santos staged at PETA Theatre	
2023	Contra Mundum: Ang All-Star Concert ng Ang Larawan	Manolo Marasigan	Invitational affair staged on 6 May 2023 at the Metropolitan Theater to kick off National Heritage Month and also to mark 50 years of the establishment of the Philippine's Order of National Artists.	
2024	Balete	Francisco	Tanghalang Pilipino	

== Awards and nominations ==
Year	Award-giving body	Category	Work	Result	Ref.
1997	Annual Citations of Young Critics Circle Film Desk	Best Performance	Milagros	Nominated	
1998	Philippine Movie Press Club (PMPC) Star Awards for Movies	Movie Supporting Actor of the Year	Milagros	Won	
2005	Aliw Awards	Best Stage Actor	Palasyo ni Valentin	Won	
2005	Asian TV Awards	Best Drama Performance by an Actor	Magpakailanman: Till the End of Time (Despite the Hurts, an Aids Victim Story)	Won	
2014	Annual Citations of Young Critics Circle Film Desk	Best Performance (with Eula Valdez)	Dagitab	Won	
2016	Luna Awards of the Film Academy of the Philippines (FAP)	Best Supporting Actor	Heneral Luna	Won	
2016	Philippine Movie Press Club (PMPC) Star Awards for Movies	Movie Supporting Actor of the Year	Heneral Luna	Nominated	
2017	Gawad Urian	Best Supporting Actor	Ang Babaeng Humayo	Nominated	
2018	Filipino Academy of Movie Arts and Sciences Awards (FAMAS)	Best Actor	Smaller and Smaller Circles	Nominated	
2018	Gawad Urian	Best Actor	Smaller and Smaller Circles	Nominated	
2019	Gawad Urian	Best Supporting Actor	Citizen Jake	Nominated	
2019	Philippine Movie Press Club (PMPC) Star Awards for Movies	Movie Actor of the Year	Distance	Nominated	
2021	Asian Academy Creative Awards	Best Actor in a Supporting Role	Huwag Kang Mangamba	Won	
2022	Metro Manila Film Festival	Best Actor	Family Matters	Nominated	
2023	Philippine Movie Press Club (PMPC) Star Awards for Television	Best Single Performance by an Actor	Maalaala Mo Kaya: Life's Sketch	Nominated	
