= Sid & Aya: Not a Love Story =

2018 film directed by Irene Villamor

- Theatrical release poster
- Directed by: Irene Emma Villamor
- Written by: Irene Villamor
- Produced by: Vic del Rosario Jr.
- Starring: Anne Curtis; Dingdong Dantes
- Cinematography: Pao Orendain
- Edited by: Carlo Francisco Manatad
- Music by: Len Calvo
- Production companies: Viva Films; N² Productions
- Distributed by: Viva Films
- Release date: May 30, 2018
- Running time: 94 minutes
- Country: Philippines
- Language: Filipino
- Box office: ₱160 million

Sid & Aya: Not a Love Story is a 2018 Philippine romantic drama film directed by Irene Villamor and starring Anne Curtis and Dingdong Dantes.

== Synopsis ==
The story follows Sid (Dingdong Dantes) who has insomnia and meets Aya (Anne Curtis) whom he hires to accompany him in his sleepless nights.

== Cast ==
Main cast

- Anne Curtis as Aya
- Dingdong Dantes as Sid

Supporting cast

- Gabby Eigenmann as Darren Syquia
- Pocholo Baretto as Jerry
- Bubbles Paraiso as Dani
- Josef Elizalde as Gabe
- Pio Balbuena
- Gab Lagman
- Joey Marquez
- Jobelle Salvador
- Johnny Revilla
