= Meet Me in St. Gallen =

- Theatrical film poster
- Directed by: Irene Emma Villamor
- Written by: Irene Emma Villamor
- Produced by: Vic del Rosario Jr.; Piolo Jose Pascual; Joyce Bernal; Erickson Raymundo
- Starring: Carlo Aquino; Bela Padilla
- Cinematography: Pao Orendain
- Edited by: Carlo Francisco Manatad
- Music by: Emerzon Texon
- Production companies: Viva Films; Spring Films
- Release date: February 7, 2018
- Country: Philippines
- Languages: Filipino; English
- Box office: ₱75 million

Meet Me in St. Gallen is a 2018 Filipino romantic comedy-drama film written and directed by Irene Emma Villamor, starring Carlo Aquino and Bela Padilla. In the story, Celeste (Padilla) and Jesse (Aquino) have a one-night stand and then go their separate ways, only to end up meeting again in St. Gallen, Switzerland. The film was released February 7, 2018, in theaters nationwide.

== Synopsis ==
Celeste (Bela Padilla) assumes the name "Katy Perry" whenever she hangs out at coffee shops. She then meets Jesse (Carlo Aquino) and the two realize that their names are similar to those of the American romantic-comedy-drama film Celeste and Jesse Forever. Consequently, their time spent together ends up on a one-night stand and, although they go their separate ways afterward, they would reunite a couple of years later where they agreed to see each other, St. Gallen.

== Cast ==
- Carlo Aquino as Jesse Abaya
- Bela Padilla as Celeste Francisco
- Nonie Buencamino as Jesse's father
- Kat Galang as Celeste's friend

Angelica Panganiban also made her in-photo cameo appearance as Diana.

== Production ==
Irene Villamor, the writer and director of Meet Me in St. Gallen, developed the idea for the film. After writing the script, Villamor sent it to Carlo Aquino who, although was initially reluctant to play Jesse, eventually took over as he felt it delivered a fresh vision on the romantic-comedy genre. Bela Padilla, whose previous collaboration with Villamor was in Camp Sawi, was cast as Aquino's girlfriend Celeste. Aquino's and Padilla's casting was officially announced mid-October 2017. Principal photography in St. Gallen began mid-December 2017 and lasted four days. A sex scene between Aquino and Padilla was filmed on a single take.

== Reception ==
=== Box office ===
The film earned PHP 3 million on its first day of showing. The production company of the film announced via their Instagram website that the film earned an estimated PHP 55 million last February 18, 2018. The film grossed an estimated PHP 75 million.

== See also ==
- Kita Kita
- Celeste and Jesse Forever
