= Cinema Evaluation Board =

Filipino film evaluation board

The Cinema Evaluation Board (CEB) is a body of the Film Development Council of the Philippines (FDCP), tasked with grading Filipino films by quality. It is represented in the Philippine Film Export Services Office.

The CEB was established in 2003, succeeding the Film Ratings Board (FRB) which became defunct in early 2002. Like its predecessor, it gave tax rebates to films depending on their grading but unlike the FRB, the CEB's powers to give tax rebates is mandated by law.

On December 10, 2019, the Supreme Court deemed the collection of amusement taxes by the FDCP to be unconstitutional, and ruled that the CEB should no longer award amusement tax privileges to films.

== List of chairpersons ==
- Zeneida Amador (2003–2004)
- Rolando "Jacky" Atienza (2005–2006)
- Christine S. Dayrit (2006–2024)
