= 2019 Pista ng Pelikulang Pilipino =

2019 Pista ng Pelikulang Pilipino 3rd Pista ng Pelikulang Pilipino
- No. of films: 10
- Festival date: September 13–19, 2019

PPP chronology
- 2020 2018

The 2019 Pista ng Pelikulang Pilipino (PPP, transl. Festival of Filipino Films) is the 3rd edition of the annual Pista ng Pelikulang Pilipino, organized by the Film Development Council of the Philippines. It featured 10 locally produced films which was screened from September 13 to 19, 2019.

The film festival was held as part of the One Hundred Years of Philippine Cinema celebrations.

== Entries ==
=== Feature films ===
Title	Director
First batch
Cuddle Weather	Rod Marmol
The Panti Sisters	Jun Robles Lana
LSS: Last Song Syndrome	Jade Castro
Second batch
G!	Dondon Santos
I'm Ellenya L.	Boy 2 Quizon
Watch Me Kill	Tyrone Acierto
Open	Andoy Ranay
PPP Sandaan Showcase
Circa	Adolf Alix Jr.
Lola Igna	Eduardo Roy Jr.
Pagbalik	Hubert Tibi & Maria Ranillo

=== Sine Kabataan Shorts ===
- Atchoy by Regin De Guzman
- Baon by Czareena Rozhiell Malasig
- Chok by Richard Jeroui Salvadico & Arlie Sweet Sumagaysay
- Kalakalaro by Rodson Verr C. Suarez
- Kanlungan by Leslie Ann Ramirez
- Magna by Geoffrey Jules Solidum
- Pinggu, pwede na? by Elle Marie Ubas & Johanna Valdez
- Tinay by Andre Jacques Fallari Tigno & Angelo Fernando
- Toto, tawag ka ng ate mo by Mary Franz Salazar

=== Non-competition entry ===
- Verdict (a.k.a. Judgement, 2019 Venice Film Festival Special Jury Prize) by Raymund Ribay Gutierrez
