= 2017 Pista ng Pelikulang Pilipino =

2017 Pista ng Pelikulang Pilipino 1st Pista ng Pelikulang Pilipino
- No. of films: 12
- Festival date: August 16–22, 2017

PPP chronology
- 2018

The 2017 Pista ng Pelikulang Pilipino (PPP, transl. Festival of Filipino Films) is the inaugural edition of the annual Pista ng Pelikulang Pilipino, organized by the Film Development Council of the Philippines. It featured 12 locally produced films which was screened from August 16 to 22, 2017.

== Entries ==
=== Feature films ===
Entry films had to be submitted in a finished state by June 15, 2017. The official entries were determined by a selection committee composed of Erik Matti, Joey Javier Reyes, Manet A. Dayrit, Ricky Lee, Lee Meily, Oggs Cruz, and Iza Calzado. The official entries were revealed on June 30, 2017.

- 100 Tula Para Kay Stella by Jason Paul Laxamana
- AWOL by Enzo Williams
- Bar Boys by Kip Oebanda
- Birdshot by Mikhail Red
- Hamog by Ralston Jover
- Ang Manananggal sa Unit 23B by Prime Cruz
- Paglipay by Zig Dulay
- Patay na si Hesus by Victor Villanueva
- Pauwi Na by Paolo Villaluna
- Salvage by Sherad Anthony Sanchez
- Star na si Van Damme Stallone by Randolph Longjas
- Triptiko by Miguel Franco Michelena

=== Short films ===
The National Youth Commission selected 12 films for the Sine Kabataan Shorts, the short film portion of the festival. A total of 185 entries were submitted.

- Haraya by Daniel Delgado
- Fat You by Ronnel Rivera III)
- Dorothy by Angelique Evangelista)
- Delayed Si Jhemerlyn Rose by Don Senoc
- Alipato by Michael Joshua Manahan
- Akalingwan Nang Rosa by Max Canlas
- Ya Right by Gab Mesina
- Shaded by Vanneza Clear Estanol
- Ang Unang Araw ng Pasukan by Ar-Jen Manlapig
- Pahimakas by Lance Maravillas
- Ang Kapitbahay Ko Sa 2014 by Anya Nepomuceno
- Makartur by Brian Spencer Reyes
