= Christian Bables =

Filipino actor and model (born 1992)

- Born: Christian Mercurio Bables; December 6, 1992 (age 33); Bacoor, Cavite, Philippines
- Citizenship: Filipino
- Education: De La Salle University – Dasmariñas
- Occupations: Actor; model
- Years active: 2015–present
- Agents: Asian Artist Agency (2017–present); KreativDen (2021–2024); Cornerstone Entertainment (2024-present)
- Height: 175 cm (5 ft 9 in)

Christian Mercurio Bables (born December 6, 1992), is a Filipino actor and model. Numerous critics have recognized him as one of the most skilled young actors in the Philippine entertainment industry. He won Best Actor at the fifth Hanoi International Film Festival for his performance as the lead character Intoy in the drama film Signal Rock. He also won the Best Supporting Actor Award at the Gawad Urian Awards, 42nd MMFF and FAP Luna Awards for his character Barbs in the LGBT comedy-drama film Die Beautiful.

In 2021, won the Best Actor award at the Metro Manila Film Festival, 5th Eddy’s Choice Awards, and 19th Asian Film Festival for the movie Big Night!. In 2022, Bables starred as Dali, an effeminate fashion designer who falls in love with a beauty queen and faces the pressure to prove his heterosexuality to her and everyone else around them, in the romantic comedy film Mahal Kita, Beksman. The film screened at various international film festivals and won the Best Non-US Release (Philippines) accolade at the 27th Online Film Critics Society Awards. He also gained broader recognition among the Filipino public for his role as Max Dionisio in the acclaimed teleserye, Dirty Linen.

== Early life ==
Bables was born on December 6, 1992, in Bacoor, Cavite. He is the second son of Rodrigo Bables (deceased) and Bing Mercurio-Urbano of Escalante, Negros Occidental. He graduated with a Communication Arts Degree from De La Salle University Dasma in 2013. Although Bables grew up in Cavite, where the dominant language is Tagalog, he is fluent in Cebuano. He credits his fluency in the language to his Visayan mother.

Bables has denied getting plastic surgery for his distinctive aquiline nose. He has stated that he was "born with it" and inherited the feature from his mother, who is of Spanish Filipino descent. According to Bables, other people bullied him for his nose when he was growing up, calling him Pinocchio.

== Career ==
=== 2011–2018: Workshops, supporting roles, first lead role ===
Bables first enrolled in Star Magic's acting workshops in 2011. At first, Bables' mother disapproved of him pursuing showbiz. She wanted him to seek a corporate job or focus on their family's advertising firm. However, Bables was drawn more towards the performing arts, particularly acting. She eventually relented, allowing him to continue his career in entertainment.

In 2017, The Philippine Star wrote that Bables' career "languished for six years", as he was relegated to bit and supporting roles. Bables said of his career's early years, "I auditioned, but no one wanted to cast me. They said I wasn't popular; that I had no name. No one wanted to trust me." He auditioned for the LGBT comedy-drama Die Beautiful and initially failed to land a role. However, the creatives behind the film gave him another chance, asking him to recite the script, and later decided to cast him as the main character Trisha's best friend, Barbs. Bables won Best Supporting Actor at the Metro Manila Film Festival for his performance as Barbs, and the film bolstered his career. The media gave him the moniker "Pambansang Bes" (Nation's Best Friend). Regal Films cast Bables in his first lead role in 2017, for the then-untitled drama film Signal Rock, which was released a year later in 2018.

=== 2019–present: Breakthrough roles ===
Bables' performance as Barbs Cordero in Die Beautiful earned him 3 Best Supporting Actor awards from separate award-giving bodies, the MMFF, Gawad Urian, and Luna Awards.

In 2018, he won Best Leading Actor at the 5th Hanoi International Film Festival for his performance in Signal Rock.

In 2021, he played the lead role in the black comedy film Big Night!. Jason Tan Liwag of Rappler lauded Bables' performance, describing him as "an indelible onscreen presence" and "a force to be reckoned with." Bables won Best Actor at the 47th Metro Manila Film Festival for his performance in the film.

In May 2024, Bables signed a contract with Legacy Entertainment, a talent agency based in the USA. He clarified that he will "forever" be a Filipino actor and has no intentions to leave his Philippines-based talent agency, KreativDen.

== Personal life ==
Despite Bables' association with queer characters, he has clarified that he identifies as a straight man. He has said that he's "tired" of the gender role-based stereotyping he has faced and speculation towards his sexuality.

== Filmography ==
=== Film ===
| Year | Title | Role |
|---|---|---|
| 2016 | I Love You to Death | Apol |
| 2016 | Die Beautiful | Barbs Cordero |
| 2017 | Finally Found Someone | Noah Alcala |
| 2017 | The Ghost Bride | David Chao |
| 2018 | Recipe for Love | Calixto "Calix" Marcel |
| 2018 | Signal Rock | Intoy Abakan |
| 2019 | The Panti Sisters | Samuel Panti |
| 2021 | Bekis On the Run | Donald |
| 2021 | Big Night! | Dharna/Panfilo Macaspac Jr. |
| 2022 | Mahal Kita, Beksman | Dali Salvador |
| 2023 | Ten Little Mistresses | Lady G / Lady H |
| 2023 | Broken Hearts Trip | Alfred |
| 2023 | Becky & Badette | Madam Luka (Cameo) |
| 2026 | Drags to Riches | Jonas /Jarold |
| 2026 | Makikiraan po (Let Us Through, Dear Ancestors) | Dungwen |

=== Television ===
| Year | Title | Role |
|---|---|---|
| 2015 | Nasaan Ka Nang Kailangan Kita | Dwayne |
| 2017 | Maalaala Mo Kaya: Salamin | Reuben "Ben" Hernandez |
| 2017 | Magpakailanman | Ramon Burce |
| 2018–2019 | Halik | Barry Bartolome |
| 2020–2021 | It's Showtime | Himself / Studio player |
| 2021 | Maalaala Mo Kaya: Paru-paro | Iron Guerrero |
| 2021 | Your Face Sounds Familiar (Philippine season 3) | Himself / Performer |
| 2021 | ASAP Natin 'To | Himself / Dance performer |
| 2022 | Mars Ravelo's Darna | Dr. Alex Dela Torre / Killer Ghost |
| 2023 | Drag You and Me | Charlie Bautista / Bubbles Lacroix |
| 2023 | Dirty Linen | Joseph Maximus "Max" Dionisio |
| 2024–2025 | Saving Grace | Chito Sumulong |
| 2026 | The Secrets of Hotel 88 | Jeff (Cameo) |

== Awards, nominations and special recognition ==
| Year | Festival/Award Ceremony | Award | Movie | Result | Ref. |
|---|---|---|---|---|---|
| 2025 | Anak TV Seal Awards 2025 | Net Makabata Star for Male | N/A | Honoree | |
| 2023 | 39th FAP Luna Awards | Best Actor | Mahal Kita, Beksman | Nominated | |
| 2022 | 70th FAMAS Awards | Best Actor | Big Night! | Nominated | |
| 2022 | 5th Entertainment Editors' Choice Awards | Best Actor | Big Night! | Won | |
| 2022 | 19th Asian Film Festival | Best Actor | Big Night! | Won | |
| 2021 | 47th Metro Manila Film Festival | Best Actor | Big Night! | Won | |
| 2020 | 4th GEMS Hiyas ng Sining Awards | Best Actor | The Panti Sisters | Nominated | |
| 2019 | 37th FAP Luna Awards | Best Actor | Signal Rock | Nominated | |
| 2019 | 6th Urduja Heritage Film Awards | Best Actor | Signal Rock | Won | |
| 2019 | Asian Pop-Up Cinema (Chicago, Illinois) | Bright Star Award | Signal Rock | Won | |
| 2019 | 3rd Entertainment Editors' Choice Awards | Best Actor | Signal Rock | Nominated | |
| 2019 | 42nd Gawad Urian | Best Actor | Signal Rock | Nominated | |
| 2019 | 67th FAMAS Awards | Best Actor | Signal Rock | Nominated | |
| 2019 | 3rd GEMS Hiyas ng Sining Awards | Best Actor | Signal Rock | Nominated | |
| 2019 | 11th National Commission for Culture and the Arts Ani ng Dangal Awards | | Signal Rock | Honoree | |
| 2019 | 3rd Film Development Council of the Philippines Film Ambassadors' Night | | Signal Rock | Honoree | |
| 2018 | 9th Philippine Daily Inquirer Indie Bravo! Awards | | Signal Rock | Honoree | |
| 2018 | 5th Hanoi International Film Festival | Best Leading Actor | Signal Rock | Won | |
| 2018 | 2nd Pista ng Pelikulang Pilipino | Special Jury Award | Signal Rock | Won | |
| 2017 | 11th Gawad Genio | Best Film Debut Performer | Die Beautiful | Won | |
| 2017 | 33rd PMPC Star Awards for Movies | New Movie Actor of the Year | Die Beautiful | Nominated | |
| 2017 | 33rd PMPC Star Awards for Movies | Movie Supporting Actor of the Year | Die Beautiful | Nominated | |
| 2017 | 35th FAP Luna Awards | Best Supporting Actor | Die Beautiful | Won | |
| 2017 | 40th Gawad Urian | Best Supporting Actor | Die Beautiful | Won | |
| 2016 | 42nd Metro Manila Film Festival | Best Supporting Actor | Die Beautiful | Won | |
