= Lola Igna =

2019 dramedy film by Eduardo Roy Jr.

- Theatrical Movie Poster
- Directed by: Eduardo Roy Jr.
- Written by: Eduardo Roy Jr.; Margarette Labrador
- Produced by: Almond Derla; Eduardo Roy Jr.; Ferdinand Lapuz; John Joseph Tan
- Starring: Angie Ferro; Yves Flores
- Cinematography: Tey Clamor
- Edited by: Carlo Francisco Manatad
- Music by: Andrew Florentino
- Production companies: ERJ Found Films; EMBA Productions
- Distributed by: Film Development Council of the Philippines
- Release date: September 12, 2019
- Running time: 122 minutes
- Country: Philippines
- Language: Filipino
- Budget: ₱1,500,000
- Box office: ₱3,500,000

Lola Igna (transl. Grandma Igna) is a 2019 Philippine dramedy film co-produced and directed by Eduardo Roy Jr. from a screenplay he co-wrote with Margarette Labrador. Starring veteran actress Angie Ferro and Yves Flores, the story follows a centenarian-aged woman whom the townsfolk knew could become the world's oldest grandmother.

Produced by ERJ Found Films and EMBA Productions, the film was theatrically released in the Philippines on September 12, 2019, as one of the entries of the 3rd Pista ng Pelikulang Pilipino.

== Plot ==
Lola Igna, a centenarian farmer living alone in a hut on her ricefield, becomes the subject of media attention in her sleepy provincial town when the Mayor announces that she has a shot at becoming the world's oldest living grandmother. Asked what she wants in life, she shocks everyone when she says she wants to die.

Igna's granddaughter, Nida, takes advantage of her grandmother's newfound fame by selling themed merchandise of her while Igna tries to maintain her routine and fend off droves of journalists and tourists at her home. One day, she empties her urinal at a boy who turns out to be Tim, her great-grandson from her estranged other granddaughter Ana, who left years ago after an argument with Nida. Tim explains that he left her mother to escape domestic troubles and seeks to reconnect with Lola Igna while making a vlog. Tim quickly learns the ropes at farm work and helps Igna gather wood, which Igna tells will be used for building her coffin. Igna explains that she started preparing for her death after seeing her late husband, Carias, one night, thinking that he was coming to take her into the afterlife. Tim is perplexed but continues to gather the wood.

After attending a wake, Igna breaks down in front of Tim, saying that the reason she wants to die is that she has been fed up attending the funerals of everyone she has known, particularly as she has outlived many of those she had helped be born as a midwife. Tim finally understands Igna's predicament and proceeds wholeheartedly into building her coffin, despite Nida's protests. He also teaches Igna how to use his technical equipment as she opens up to visitors and well-wishers. Some time later, a pregnant Ana arrives to be with her son and grandmother and reconciles with Nida. Ana then goes into labor and gives birth by the ricefield, only to die upon seeing Carias. Igna uses her coffin for Ana's funeral instead.

Media attention on Igna fades away as another person wins the title of oldest living grandmother, and life in town returns to normal. Tim stays on with Igna at the farm while raising her sister.

== Cast ==
=== Main cast ===
- Angie Ferro as Lola Igna
- Yves Flores as Tim

=== Supporting cast ===
- Maria Isabel Lopez as Nida
- Meryll Soriano as Ana
- Soliman Cruz as Town Mayor
- Royce Cabrera as Bok
- Jojo Riguerra as Nida's Husband
- Peewee O'Hara as Senyang (Nida's Storekeeper)
- Armand Reyes as Gusting
- Joel Saracho as Quack Doctor
- Rener Concepcion as Carias
- Chamyto Aguedan as Tourist
- Sarah Pagkalinawan-Brakensiek as Tourist

== Production ==
Lola Igna was directed by Eduardo Roy Jr. under the production of Found Films and EMBA Productions.

According to Roy, the concept of the film originated from his own reflections on his relationship with his maternal great-grandmother who is a resident of Sagada who died at the age of 80 years in 2012. The film was a tribute to Roy's great grandmother, describing it as story of what if he got to bond more with his great grandmother since he did not have a chance to learn more about her since she lived in the remote Mountain Province. Lola Igna is a representation of Roy's great grandmother and the main protagonist who went to Sagada to meet Igna represents himself.

The film was to feature in Cinemalaya twice; the first in 2012 and the second in 2017. The film had to be pulled-out as one of the official entries of the 2012 edition due to revisions on the script that would satisfy the demands of an international distributor and due to budgetary concerns. Work on the film had to be halted due to director Eduardo Roy's illness consequentially caused its withdrawal from the 2017 edition of Cinemalaya.

== Release ==
This film was supposed to be part of Cinemalaya 2012 but it was withdrawn because the film's script was revised by its producer in order to meet the needs of an international distributor. It was chosen again and was supposed to feature as one of the entries of the Cinemalaya 2017 but production backed out from the film fest. In 2018, Lola Igna was chosen as one of the official entries of the 2018 ToFarm Film Festival Philippines. However, it got pulled out again. It was announced as an official entry to the 3rd Pista ng Pelikulang Pilipino of the Film Development Council of the Philippines and was shown in Philippine cinemas from September 12–19, 2019.

== Reception ==
=== Critical reception ===
The film has received critical acclaim in the 2019 Pista ng Pelikulang Pilipino's Awards Night on September 16, 2019. It was awarded the coveted "Best Picture", Best Screenplay, Best Musical Score and Best Actress for Angie Ferro.

A review excerpt published by GMA News and written by J. Neil Garcia stated: "What an ordinary, straightforward, and given the recent spate of miserablist and ‘poverty-porny’ films entirely refreshing vision of our people’s inner truth—indeed, of all of humanity’s inner and most resplendent truth: while everyone and everything passes, what will remain of us is love. Kudos, hence, to Lola Igna’s producers, writers, cast, and crew, for such a touching and memorable film. Congratulations to Roy, who is moving from strength to strength as a director, and who is definitely one of our cinema’s bright new lights. And of course, hats off and immense respect to the great Angie Ferro, whose dignified and poignantly human ‘enfleshment’ of Lola Igna will doubtless be a touchstone performance for other actors for many generations to come."

Meanwhile, Oggs Cruz of Rappler.com commented that, "Eduardo Roy, Jr.’s Lola Igna is an absolute charmer. Society still plays a crucial part in this otherwise private concern, and Roy doesn’t just understand that, he fully comprehends that everything is interconnected. The film instinctively balances the inhumanity of being a world record and the profoundness of the pleasures of death after living a life fully lived, resulting in a truly tender portrait of this world’s most subtle and mysterious injustices."

Miggy Ramos of Cinema Bravo writes a review entitled, "Beautiful, heartfelt lessons in life (and death)", praising the film favorably and stating that, "Lola Igna gives us a chance to revisit our purpose in life: the very reason for our existence. It tells us that life is precious and that we have to be thankful for it every day. We may not know what the future would bring but living in the present is much more important. Lola Igna, as a character and a film, could help us move on from our struggles in life by simply living more and loving the people around us to the fullest."

=== Accolades ===
Year	Award-giving body	Recipient(s)	Award	Result
2019	3rd Pista ng Pelikulang Pilipino	Lola Igna	Best Picture	Won
2019	3rd Pista ng Pelikulang Pilipino	Angie Ferro	Best Actress	Won
2019	3rd Pista ng Pelikulang Pilipino	Andrew Florentino	Best Musical Score	Won
2019	3rd Pista ng Pelikulang Pilipino	Eduardo Roy, Jr. and Margarette Labrador	Best Screenplay	Won
2019	3rd Pista ng Pelikulang Pilipino	Maria Isabel Lopez	Best Supporting Actress	Nominated
2020	7th Urduja Heritage Film Awards	Lola Igna	Best Heritage Film	Won
2020	7th Urduja Heritage Film Awards	Yves Flores	Best Supporting Actor	Won
2020	7th Urduja Heritage Film Awards	Angie Ferro	Best Actress in Comedy or Musical	Won
2020	7th Urduja Heritage Film Awards	Eduardo Roy, Jr.	Best Director	Won
2020	7th Urduja Heritage Film Awards	Meryll Soriano	Best Actress in a Cameo Role	Won
