= Black Sheep Productions =

Philippine film studio, subsidiary of Star Cinema

- Trade name: Black Sheep
- Type: Division
- Industry: Film
- Predecessor: Skylight Films
- Founded: June 15, 2018; 8 years ago
- Headquarters: ABS-CBN Broadcasting Center, Sgt. Esguerra Avenue corner Mother Ignacia Street, Diliman, Quezon City, Metro Manila, Philippines
- Key people: Kriz Gazmen; Olivia Lamasan
- Products: Motion pictures
- Owner: ABS-CBN Corporation
- Parent: Star Cinema

Black Sheep Productions (or simply Black Sheep) is a Philippine film production studio owned by Star Cinema, a subsidiary of ABS-CBN Corporation. Founded in 2018, the studio produces films that are situated in between independent films and mainstream films released by the major Philippine film studios.

Black Sheep is best known for producing the films Exes Baggage (2018), Alone/Together (2019), Fan Girl (2020), and Whether the Weather is Fine (2021).

== History ==
Black Sheep was founded on June 15, 2018, with Exes Baggage as its first film. The brand positions itself in between ABS-CBN Films' two other major brands, Star Cinema, which is more family-oriented, and Cinema One Originals, which is considered more arthouse.

== List of Black Sheep films ==
=== 2018 ===
Title	Release date	Director	Cast	Genre(s)	Associated film production
Exes Baggage	September 26	Dan Villegas	Angelica Panganiban, Carlo Aquino	Romance, Drama	
Oda sa Wala	October 23 (QCinema)	Dwein Baltazar	Pokwang	Romance, Drama	Epicmedia Productions, Q Cinema
To Love Some Buddy	October 31	Jason Paul Laxamana	Maja Salvador, Zanjoe Marudo	Romance	

=== 2019 ===
Title	Release date	Director	Cast	Genre(s)	Associated film production
Sakaling Maging Tayo	January 16	JP Habac	Mccoy De Leon, Elisse Joson	Romance, Drama	
Alone/Together	February 13	Antoinette Jadaone	Liza Soberano, Enrique Gil	Romance, Drama	
Between Maybes	May 15	Jason Paul Laxamana	Gerald Anderson, Julia Barretto	Romance	
Clarita	June 12	Derick Cabrido	Jodi Sta. Maria, Arron Villaflor, Ricky Davao	Horror	
Ani The Harvest	August 2 (Cinemalaya Film Festival)	Kim Zuñiga and Sandro Del Rosario	Zyren Dela Cruz	Science Fiction	Wanderstruck Films
The Panti Sisters	September 13	Jun Lana	Paolo Ballesteros, Martin del Rosario, Christian Bables	Comedy	ABS-CBN Film Productions Inc. Quantum Films; The IdeaFirst Company
Open	September 13	Andoy Ranay	Arci Munoz, JC Santos	Romance, Drama	T-Rex Entertainment
Isa Pa With Feelings	October 16	Prime Cruz	Maine Mendoza, Carlo Aquino	Romance	APT Entertainment

=== 2020 ===
Title	Release date	Director	Cast	Genre(s)	Associated film production
Motel Acacia	March 11	Bradley Liew	JC Santos, Agot Isidro	Horror	Epicmedia Productions
Fan Girl	December 25 (Online)	Antoinette Jadaone	Paulo Avelino, Charlie Dizon	Drama	Globe Studios, Project 8, Epicmedia Productions, Crossword Productions

=== 2021 ===
Title	Release date	Director	Cast	Genre(s)	Associated film production
Hello Stranger: The Movie	February 12	Dwein Baltazar	Tony Labrusca, JC Alcantara, Vivoree Esclito, Patrick Quiroz, Gillian Vicencio, Miguel Almendras	Boys' Love	
The Death of Nintendo	April 23 (online)	Raya Martin	Noel Comia Jr.	Horror	IndieFlip; Toho (Japan)
Whether the Weather is Fine	December 25	Carlo Francisco Manatad	Charo Santos-Concio, Daniel Padilla, Rans Rifol	Drama	Globe Studios, Dreamscape Entertainment

=== 2023 ===
Title	Release date	Director	Cast	Genre(s)	Associated film production
Ang Mga Kaibigan ni Mama Susan	May 18	Chito S. Roño	Joshua Garcia	Horror	Regal Entertainment, Top Story
Third World Romance	August 16	Dwein Baltazar	Carlo Aquino and Charlie Dizon	Romance, Comedy	

=== 2024 ===
Title	Release date	Director	Cast	Genre(s)	Associated film production
I Am Not Big Bird	February 14	Victor Villanueva	Enrique Gil, Pepe Herrera, Nikko Natividad and Red Ollero	Comedy	Anima

=== Upcoming films ===
Title	Release date	Director	Cast	Genre(s)	Associated film production	Ref.
The Guest	TBA	Jerrold Tarog	Daniel Padilla and John Arcilla	Psychological thriller	Quantum Films	
Elena 1944	2026	Olivia Lamasan	Kathryn Bernardo	Historical drama, Action	Anima	
