= 2018 Pista ng Pelikulang Pilipino =

2018 Pista ng Pelikulang Pilipino 2nd Pista ng Pelikulang Pilipino
- No. of films: 12
- Festival date: August 15–21, 2018

PPP chronology
- 2019 2017

The 2018 Pista ng Pelikulang Pilipino (PPP, transl. Festival of Filipino Films) is the 2nd edition of the annual Pista ng Pelikulang Pilipino, organized by the Film Development Council of the Philippines. It featured 8 locally produced films which was screened from August 15 to 21, 2018.

The entry films were screened in all theaters nationwide, except specialty cinemas including, among others, IMAX, 4DX, Director’s Club, A-Giant (Large Format Cinema), Christie laser projection powered and all Gold Class Screens. However, there are some entries like Ang Babaeng Allergic sa WiFi shown in Director's Clubs in SM Aura in Taguig City and Madilim ang Gabi and Pinay Beauty in SM City East Ortigas in Pasig. On August 18, 2018, foreign movies continued showing in regular cinemas.

== Entries ==
=== Feature films ===
==== Main entries ====
Entry films had to be submitted in a finished state by June 15, 2018. The finalists were revealed on July 9, 2018, at the Sequioa Hotel in Quezon City.

- Ang Babaeng Allergic sa WiFi by Jun Robles Lana
- Bakwit Boys by Jason Paul Laxamana
- The Day After Valentine's by Jason Paul Laxamana
- Madilim ang Gabi (Dark is The Night) by Adolfo Alix Jr.
- Pinay Beauty by Jay Abello
- Signal Rock by Chito Roño
- Unli Life by Miko Livelo
- We Will Not Die Tonight by Richard Somes

==== Non-competition entries ====
- Balangiga: Howling Wilderness by Khavn (QCinema International Film Festival 2017 Circle Competition Best Picture)
- Gusto Kita With All My Hypothalamus by Dwein Baltazar (CineFilipino 2018 2nd Best Picture)
- High Tide by Tara Illenberger (TOFARM Film Festival 2017 Best Picture)
- Kiko Boksingero by Thop Nazareno (Cinemalaya 2017)
- Paki by Giancarlo Abrahan (Cinema One Originals 2017 Best Picture)
- Tu Pug Imatuy by Arnel Barbarona (Sinag Maynila 2017 Best Picture)

=== Short films ===
The National Youth Commission selected films for the Sine Kabataan Shorts, the short film portion of the festival.

- Koleksyong Pamalo by Jocelyn Frago
- Bato Bato Pik by Lorys Plaza and Ardinian Sanque
- Masaya Ako by Daniel Delgado and Tiara Angelica Nicolas
- Alas-Nuebe ng Tanghali by Enalyn Legaspi
- Runner by Levi Jun Miscala
- Anonymous Student Vlog by Christian Babista
- Bahay-bahayan by Brian Spencer Reyes
- Isang Tula Para Sa Nawawala by Rod Singh
