= Angie Ferro =

Filipino actress (1937–2023)

- Born: Angelica Caballero Ferro; August 4, 1937; Baleno, Masbate, Commonwealth of the Philippines
- Died: August 17, 2023 (aged 86)
- Occupations: Film, television and theater actress
- Years active: 1969–2023

Angie Ferro (born Angelica Caballero Ferro; August 4, 1937 – August 17, 2023) was a Filipino film, television and theatre actress.

== Early life ==
Angie Ferro was born as Angelica Caballero Ferro in Baleno, Masbate, on August 4, 1937. to a family of farmers.

== Theater ==
Ferro began her acting career in 1969 as a member of the Philippine Educational Theater Association. She played the role of Hecuba in the play Trojan Women directed by Tony Mabesa at the Manila Metropolitan Theater, and its TV drama series adaptation, Balintataw, under Greek director Nicos Shiafkalis. She also performed in other productions such as Blood Wedding by Federico García Lorca, as well as Ang Butihing Babae ng Sitsuan and Ang Reyna at Mga Rebelde, both of which were directed by National Artist for Theater Rolando Tinio and produced by Teatro Pilipino.

Ferro also worked with UNESCO’s International Theatre Institute (Philippine Centre) for a rendition of the poem Kung Tuyo na ang Luha mo, Aking Bayan (When your Tears are now Dry, My Country).

== Film ==
Throughout her 54-year career, Ferro worked with acclaimed film directors such as Ishmael Bernal, Lino Brocka and Chito Roño. At the age of 82, she won the best actress award in the third Pista ng Pelikulang Pilipino in 2019 and the same award during the 7th Urduja Heritage Film Awards in 2020, both for her role in the film Lola Igna.

In her elderly years, she co-starred with younger actors such as Yves Flores, her onscreen great-grandson in Lola Igna, and Joshua Garcia, her onscreen grandson in the horror movie Ang Mga Kaibigan ni Mama Susan, released in 2023. She also starred in the Irish horror movie Nocebo (2022), co-starring Eva Green, Mark Strong and Chai Fonacier.

== Illness and death ==
In 2022, Ferro suffered several strokes and a "minor accident" that led to her hospitalization. As a result, she missed the premiere of what turned out to be her last film, Ang Mga Kaibigan ni Mama Susan, in May 2023.

Ferro died on August 17, 2023, at the age of 86.

== Selected filmography ==
=== Film ===
- Zoom, Zoom, Superman! (1973)
- Patayin Mo Sa Sindak Si Barbara (1974)
- Pagputi ng Uwak...Pag-itim ng Tagak (1978)
- Atsay (1978)
- Gaano Kadalas ang Minsan? (1982)
- Magdusa Ka (1986)
- Kasalanan Bang Sambahin Ka? (1990)
- Patayin sa Sindak si Barbara (1995)
- Sidhi (1999)
- Evolution of a Filipino Family (2004)
- Bulong (2011)
- Graceland (2012)
- Da Possessed (2014)
- The Trial (2014)
- Shake, Rattle & Roll XV (2014)
- Etiquette for Mistresses (2015)
- The Achy Breaky Hearts (2016)
- Birdshot (2016)
- Moonlight Over Baler (2017)
- Lola Igna (2019)
- Nocebo (2022)
- Ang mga Kaibigan ni Mama Susan (2023)

=== Television ===
Year	Title	Role
1983–1984	Sesame!	Aling Nena
2011–2012	Amaya	Uray Hilway
2015	Pari 'Koy	Manang Josie

== Awards and nominations ==
Year	Award-Giving Body	Category	Work
2021	Philippine Movie Press Club	Nora Aunor Ulirang Artista Lifetime Achievement Award	
2020	Urduja Heritage Film Awards	Best Actress	Lola Igna
2019	Pista ng Pelikulang Pilipino	Best Actress	Lola Igna
1979	Filipino Academy of Movie Arts and Sciences	Best Supporting Actress	Pagputi ng Uwak...Pag-itim ng Tagak
