= Dan Villegas =

Filipino cinematographer and director

- Born: August 27, 1980 (age 46)
- Occupations: Cinematographer; director
- Years active: 2010–present

Dan Villegas is a Filipino cinematographer and director. He won the 2014 Metro Manila Film Festival Best Director award for his film English Only, Please. He graduated from Ateneo de Manila University. He also took up film courses at the Marilou Diaz Abaya Film Institute and Berlinale Talents in Europe.

== Filmography ==
=== Film ===
Year	Release date	Title	Credited as				Studio
Year	Release date	Title	Director	Producer	Writer	Cinematographer	Studio
2007	July 21	Still Life	No	No	No	Yes	Cinemalaya Foundation, Cutting Edge Production, Sining Ko Ito Productions
2008	July 11	Huling Pasada	No	Yes	No	Yes	Cinemalaya Foundation, Tiny Dinosaur Media Inc.
2010	July 11	Mayohan	Yes	Yes	No	Yes	Cinemalaya Inc., Alpha Dog Productions, Film Development Council of the Philippines
2011	June 15	Forever and a Day	No	No	No	Yes	Star Cinema
2012	February 15	Unofficially Yours	No	No	No	Yes	Star Cinema
2012	November 21, 2012	24/7 in Love	No	No	No	Yes	Star Cinema
2013	July 31	Bakit Hindi Ka Crush ng Crush Mo?	No	No	No	Yes	Star Cinema
2013	October 16	She's the One	No	No	No	Yes	Star Cinema
2014	January 15	Bride for Rent	No	No	No	Yes	Star Cinema
2014	July 16	She's Dating the Gangster	No	No	No	Yes	Star Cinema
2014	November 12	Relaks, It's Just Pag-ibig	No	No	No	Yes	Spring Films, Star Cinema
2014	December 25	English Only, Please	Yes	No	Story	Yes	Quantum Films, MJM Productions, Tuko Film Productions and Buchi Boy Films
2015	February 25	Crazy Beautiful You	No	No	No	Yes	Star Cinema
2015	July 1	The Breakup Playlist	Yes	No	No	Yes	Star Cinema and Viva Films
2015	November 25	A Second Chance	No	No	No	Camera operator	Star Cinema
2015	December 25	#WalangForever	Yes	No	Story	No	Quantum Films, MJM Productions, Tuko Film Productions and Buchi Boy Films
2016	February 24	Always Be My Maybe	Yes	No	No	No	Star Cinema
2016	July 27	How to Be Yours	Yes	No	Story	No	Star Cinema
2017	January 18	Ilawod	Yes	No	No	No	Quantum Films
2017	May 3	Luck at First Sight	Yes	No	No	No	Viva Films and N^{2} Productions
2017	November 14	Changing Partners	Yes	Yes	No	No	Cinema One Originals and Star Cinema
2017	December 25	All of You	Yes	No	Yes	No	Quantum Films, MJM Productions, Globe Studios, Planet A Productions
2018	March 31	Never Not Love You	No	Yes	No	No	Viva Films and Project 8 Corner San Joaquin Projects
2018	September 26	Exes Baggage	Yes	No	No	No	Black Sheep Productions and ABS-CBN Film Productions, Inc.
2018	October 22	Hintayan ng Langit	Yes	Yes	No	No	Globe Studios and Project 8 Corner San Joaquin Projects
2019	February 13	Alone/Together	No	Yes	No	No	Black Sheep Productions, Project 8 Projects
2020	December 25	Fan Girl	No	Yes	No	No	Black Sheep Productions, Globe Studios, Project 8, Epicmedia, and Crossword Productions
2021	November 17	Mang Jose	No	Yes	No	No	Project 8 Projects, Viva Films
2021	December 25	Love at First Stream	No	No	No	Yes	Star Cinema and Kumu
2023	August 5	Iti Mapukpukaw	No	Yes	No	No	Project 8 Projects, GMA News and Public Affairs, Terminal Six Post
2024	August 23	Kono Basho	No	Executive	No	Yes	Mentorque Productions, Project 8 Projects, CMB Film Services, Cinemalaya Inc.
2024	September 13	Sunshine	No	Yes	No	No	Anima Studios, Project 8 Projects, Cloudy Duck Pictures, Happy Infinite Productions
2024	November 23	Diamonds in the Sand	No	Yes	No	No	Project 8 Projects, Paperheart, Spanic Films, Nathan Studios, CMB Film Services
2024	December 25	Uninvited	Yes	Yes	No	No	Mentorque Productions and Project 8 Projects
2025	February 12	Ex Ex Lovers	No	Yes	No	No	Cornerstone Studios and Project 8 Projects
2025	November 12	Meet, Greet & Bye	No	No	No	Yes	Star Cinema
2026	May 6	Almost Us	Yes	TBA	No	No	Regal Entertainment and Project 8 Projects
TBA		Nang Mapagod si Kamatayan	Yes	No	No	No	Star Cinema and Quantum Films

=== Television ===
Year	Title	Role	Cast	Notes
2009	Project Runway Philippines	Director of Photography	Jojie Lloren, Rajo Laurel, Teresa Herrera	
2015	On The Wings of Love	Director	James Reid, Nadine Lustre	
2016	Till I Met You	Director	Nadine Lustre, James Reid, JC Santos	
2017	Ikaw Lang Ang Iibigin	Director	Kim Chiu, Gerald Anderson, Jake Cuenca, Coleen Garcia	
2019	Sino ang May Sala?	Director	Jodi Sta. Maria, Bela Padilla, Tony Labrusca, Kit Thompson, Ivana Alawi, Ketchup Eusebio, Sandino Martin	
2020	Almost Paradise	Director	Christian Kane, Samantha Richelle, Arthur Acuña, Nonie Buencamino, Ces Quesada	Episode: "Pistol Whip"
2020	I Got You	Director	Beauty Gonzalez, RK Bagatsing, Jane Oineza	
2022	Sleep with Me	Producer	Janine Gutierrez, Lovi Poe	
2023	Cattleya Killer	Director	Arjo Atayde, Jake Cuenca, Christopher de Leon, Jane Oineza, Ria Atayde, Ricky Davao, Nonie Buencamino, Zsa Zsa Padilla	
2023	Simula sa Gitna	Producer	Khalil Ramos, Maris Racal	

== Awards ==
Year	Award	Category	Work	Result
2008	31st Gawad Urian Awards	Best Cinematography	Still Life	Nominated
2011	27th PMPC Star Awards for Movies	Digital Movie Director of the Year	Mayohan	Nominated
2011	27th PMPC Star Awards for Movies	Digital Movie Cinematographer of the Year	Mayohan	Nominated
2015	41st Metro Manila Film Festival	Best Director	#WalangForever	Nominated
2015	41st Metro Manila Film Festival	Best Original Story (with Antoinette Jadaone)	#WalangForever	Won
2016	32nd PMPC Star Awards for Movies	Movie Director of the Year (Mainstream)	#WalangForever	Nominated
2016	32nd PMPC Star Awards for Movies	Movie Cinematographer of the Year (Mainstream) (with Moises Zee)	Crazy Beautiful You	Nominated
2018	34th PMPC Star Awards for Movies	Indie Movie Director of the Year	Changing Partners	Won
2025	48th Gawad Urian Awards	Best Cinematography	Kono Basho	Won

== Personal life ==
In 2020, Villegas and director Antoinette Jadaone were engaged.
