= Cleaners (2019 film) =

2019 adult animated comedy-drama film by Glenn Barit

- Theatrical release poster
- Directed by: Glenn Barit
- Written by: Glenn Barit
- Produced by: Noni Abao; Tiara Orig; Eduardo Lejano, Jr.; Manet Dayrit
- Cinematography: Steven Paul Evangelio
- Edited by: Noah Loyola; Che Tagyamon
- Music by: Glenn Barit
- Production companies: Dambuhala Productions; Point Bee Multimedia; Wapak Sound Studios; Quantum Films; plan.c; Quezon City Film Development Commission; Oktopus Productions
- Distributed by: QCinema
- Release dates: 15 October 2019 (QCinema); 21 April 2021 (Singapore); 18 September 2021 (Philippines)
- Running time: 78 minutes
- Country: Philippines
- Language: Filipino

Cleaners is a 2019 Philippine experimental adult animated coming-of-age comedy-drama film written and directed by Glenn Barit in his directorial debut. The film follows a group of high school students assigned as end-of-day classroom cleaners and their experiences surrounding various school activities during the 2007-2008 Philippine academic year in Tuguegarao, Cagayan.

Cleaners premiered on 15 October 2019 at the QCinema International Film Festival, which was a part of the Asian Next Wave Competition, and received a limited theatrical release in Singapore on 10 April 2021 through the Asian Film Archive. Since its release, Cleaners has developed a cult following.

== Plot ==
=== I. Unang Linggo (First Week) ===
The film starts with classmates as cleaners to clean up the entire classroom: Stephanie (green-colored) brushes up the chalkboard with an eraser; Britney (magenta-colored) sweeps the clutters on the floor with a broom; Francis (blue-colored) cleans the floor with coconut husk; Angeli (harlequin-colored) taps the remaining chalk dust; and trio Arnold, Eman and Lester (orange-colored) arrange the chair; and Junjun (purple-colored) shuts the door after finished cleaning.

== Cast ==
- Ianna Taguinod as Stephanie (green), an awkward student who attends the Nutrition Month.
- Leomar Baloran as Eman (orange), one of the trio who attends the Folk Dance competition.
- Julian Narag as Lester (orange), one of the trio who attends the Folk Dance competition.
- Carlo Mejia as Arnold (orange), one of the trio who attends the Folk Dance competition.
- Gianne Rivera as Angeli (harlequin), a trio's friend who attends the Folk Dance competition.
- Charise Mabbonag as Britney (magenta), an intelligent student and Francis's love interest who attends the prom.
- Allan Gannaban as Francis (blue), a bullied and meek student, and Britney's love interest who attends the prom.
- Andrei Marquez as Junjun (purple), a disobedient and stubborn student who attends the Youth Council.

== Development ==
Cleaners was filmed digitally on a Sony A7S in Tuguegarao in June 2019, led by a cast of non-professional actors portraying the students. Its use of pixilation technique estimated 40,000 frames were printed, photocopied, selectively crumpled, and then highlighted to indicate the protagonists before being digitally scanned for editing with intrusion of colour through clothing. Additional crowdfunding through The Spark Project was also sought during post-production.

== Release ==
Cleaners premiered on 15 October 2019 at the QCinema International Film Festival. It was a part of the Asian Next Wave Competition. Screenings at two University of the Philippines campuses - Diliman and Los Baños - were planned for March 2020, before the COVID-19 lockdowns prevented them from taking place. Virtual film festival screenings took place throughout 2020 and 2021, including the 25th Busan International Film Festival, 57th Taipei Golden Horse Film Festival, 4th Pista ng Pelikulang Pilipino, and 2021 Malaysia International Film Festival.

Singapore's Asian Film Archive began a limited theatrical release of Cleaners on 21 April 2021. The film was rated M18 by the Infocomm Media Development Authority (IMDA).

Virtual Philippine screenings took place in September 2021. It was indicated as a 2021 film at social cataloging service Letterboxd, where it subsequently placed number 1 on their mid-year ranking of the best films of 2021 and later ranked at number 6 on their year-end list. Its presence on the former list alongside another Philippine film, Ode to Nothing, led to international attention. A limited virtual release in the Philippines also took place in September 2021.

The film was released by Kani Releasing on Blu-ray in 2024, including a selection of short films from Barit and co-editor Che Tagyamon and a sequel short film Yung Huling Swimming Reunion Before Life Happens.

== Accolades ==
Cleaners won Best Film, Best Screenplay, and the Audience Choice award at the QCinema International Film Festival. At the 4th Pista ng Pelikulang Pilipino held virtually in 2020, the film won 5 awards from 10 nominations: Best Film, Best Director (Barit), Best Supporting Actress (Gianne Rivera), Best Production Design, and Best Original Score. An additional award, a Special Citation for Ensemble Performance, was also given to actors Leomar Baloran, Julian Narag, and Carlo Mejia. At the 38th Luna Awards, it won Best Sound and received an additional nomination for Best Director, in addition to nominations for 8 Gawad Urian Awards and 5 FAMAS Awards.
