= Philbert Dy =

Filipino film critic

Philbert Ortiz Dy is a Filipino film critic who has become known for his reviews of Philippine New Wave films for prominent publications such as Rogue Magazine, the Philippine edition of Esquire, and the entertainment website clickthecity.

He is co-curator of the New Filipino Cinema program at the Yerba Buena Center for the Arts in San Francisco, California.

He has criticized the selection process of the Metro Manila Film Festival, having published a 2015 expose of how the films to be featured in the festival were selected, with a focus on profit over other considerations.

== See also ==
- Philippine New Wave Cinema
- Oggs Cruz
