= Oda sa Wala =

2018 independent horror drama film by Dwein Ruedas Baltazar

- Release movie poster
- Directed by: Dwein Ruedas Baltazar
- Written by: Dwein Ruedas Baltazar
- Produced by: Bianca Balbuena-Liew; Kriz G. Gazmen; Marizel Samson-Martinez; Iana Celest Bernardez
- Starring: Marietta Subong; Joonee Gamboa
- Cinematography: Neil Daza
- Edited by: Dwein Ruedas Baltazar
- Music by: Richard Gonzales
- Production companies: Black Sheep Productions; Epic Media; Quiapo Collective; Quezon City Film Development Commission
- Distributed by: ABS-CBN Film Productions
- Release date: 23 October 2018 (QCinema)
- Running time: 92 minutes
- Country: Philippines
- Language: Filipino

Oda sa Wala (English: Ode to Nothing) is a 2018 Philippine independent psychological horror drama film written, edited, and directed by Dwein Baltazar. It stars Marietta "Pokwang" Subong (Note: She is credited by her full name.) in a leading role and features Joonee Gamboa, Lita Loresco, Dido Dela Paz, Anthony Falcon, and Iana Bernardez (who also produced the film) in supporting roles. Distributed by ABS-CBN Film Productions, it is a co-production of Black Sheep, Epic Media, and Quiapo Collective, with support from the Quezon City Film Development Commission.

The film was theatrically released on 23 October 2018, as part of the 6th QCinema International Film Festival. Among its several accolades, the film won two FAMAS Award from seven nominations, and earned a Gawad Urian nomination for Best Actress and was nominated for Best Film at 54th Karlovy Vary International Film Festival in Czech Republic.

== Synopsis ==
Sonya is a middle-aged woman who lives and works at the funeral parlor, which she manages with her father. Her quiet, secluded routine is disrupted by the arrival of an unidentified cadaver that remains unclaimed, prompting a series of events that alter her life and emotional state.

== Cast ==
- Pokwang as Sonya
- Joonee Gamboa as Rudy
- Lita Loresco as Old Woman
- Dido Dela Paz as Theodore
- Anthony Falcon as Elmer
- Iana Bernardez as Elmer's wife

== Production ==
Filmed in San Miguel, Bulacan, cinematographer Neil Daza briefly considered filming in black-and-white before abandoning the idea in favor of monochromatic color. It is a co-production of Black Sheep Productions, Epic Media, and Quiapo Collective, with the support of the Quezon City Film Development Commission.

== Release ==
The film was theatrically premiered on 23 October 2018, as part of the QCinema International Film Festival, competing for the "Circle Competition" category.

Oda sa Wala was released virtually in the Philippines on 23 April 2021 as part of a "Black Pack" that included other Black Sheep releases Motel Acacia, and Death of Nintendo. This indicated the film as a 2021 release on the social cataloging service Letterboxd, where it subsequently placed #2 on their mid-year ranking of the best films of 2021. Its presence on the list alongside another Philippine film, Cleaners, attracted international attention.

== Reception ==
=== Accolades ===
Award	Date	Category	Recipient	Result	Ref.
54th Karlovy Vary International Film Festival	28 June - 6 July, 2019	Best Film	Ode to Nothing	Nominated	
42nd Gawad Urian Awards	18 June 2019	Best Actress	Pokwang	Nominated	
6th QCinema International Film Festival	26 October 2018	Best Picture - Circle Competition	Ode to Nothing by Dwein Ruedas Baltazar	Won	
6th QCinema International Film Festival	26 October 2018	Best Director	Dwein Ruedas Baltazar	Won	
6th QCinema International Film Festival	26 October 2018	Best Screenplay	Dwein Ruedas Baltazar	Won	
6th QCinema International Film Festival	26 October 2018	Best Actress	Pokwang	Won	
6th QCinema International Film Festival	26 October 2018	Best Supporting Actor	Dido Dela Paz	Nominated	
6th QCinema International Film Festival	26 October 2018	Best Supporting Actor	Joonee Gamboa	Nominated	
6th QCinema International Film Festival	26 October 2018	Best Artistic Achievement	Neil Daza	Won	
35th PMPC Star Awards for Movies	2 June 2019	Indie Movie Cinematographer of the Year	Neil Daza	Nominated	
35th PMPC Star Awards for Movies	2 June 2019	Indie Movie Sound Engineer of the Year	Immanuel Verona	Nominated	
29th Young Critics Circle Awards	17 March 2019	Best Film	Ode to Nothing by Dwein Ruedas Baltazar	Nominated	
29th Young Critics Circle Awards	17 March 2019	Best Screenplay	Dwein Ruedas Baltazar	Nominated	
29th Young Critics Circle Awards	17 March 2019	Best Performer	Pokwang	Nominated	
29th Young Critics Circle Awards	17 March 2019	Best Achievement in Cinematography and Visual Design	Neil Daza and Maolen Fadul	Nominated	
29th Young Critics Circle Awards	17 March 2019	Best Achievement in Sound and Aural Orchestration	Richard Gonzales and Immanuel Verona	Nominated	

== Home media ==
American home-video distribution company Kani Releasing acquired home video distribution rights and released the film in Blu-Ray in March 2022.
