= How to Spot a Red Flag =

Philippine romantic comedy television series

- Official release poster
- Genre: Romantic comedy
- Directed by: Dwein Baltazar
- Starring: Belle Mariano; Donny Pangilinan; Jameson Blake
- Country of origin: Philippines
- Original languages: Filipino; English
- No. of episodes: 25

Production
- Running time: 20–25 minutes
- Production company: Dreamscape Entertainment

Original release
- Network: Viu
- Release: November 25, 2024 – February 18, 2025

How to Spot a Red Flag is a Philippine romantic comedy television series starring Belle Mariano and Donny Pangilinan. The show was directed by Dwein Baltazar. It premiered on Viu from November 25, 2024 to February 18, 2025.

== Synopsis ==
The spunky barista Cha finds herself torn between two young men — a quirky good guy, Matt and a confident bad boy, JR — who are both involved in catfishing her.

== Cast and characters ==
=== Main cast ===
- Belle Mariano as Cha, a barista of her family's coffee shop who was scammed from investing in crypto
- Donny Pangilinan as Matt, an MBA graduate whose nose would go red when he lies
- Jameson Blake as JR, the mischievous surfer guy who works at his dad's company

=== Supporting cast ===
- Esnyr as Maxie, the best friend of Cha
- Benjie Paras as Ime, the protective father of Cha
- Mylene Dizon as Vivian, the cool mother of Cha
- Angel Aquino as Marian, Matt's caring mother
- Christian Vasquez as Leandro, JR's father

== Episodes ==
No.	Title	Original release date
1	"Talking Stage"	November 25, 2024
Cha, a spunky coffee shop owner, finds solace in her online friend Matt whom she has yet to meet in person. However, everything changes when she finally comes face-to-face with the guy she's currently in the talking stage with.
2	"Cheater"	December 2, 2024
Cha crosses paths with Matt while uncovering the secret behind a trending coffee mix. Matt, on the other hand, discovers that someone close to him is the catfish who got him canceled online.
3	"Code Red"	December 3, 2024
Matt apologizes to Cha. However, reminded of how he owes JR his life, a guilt-ridden Matt hesitates to tell Cha the truth and instead makes a deal with his friend.
4	"Beach Please"	December 9, 2024
JR comes to Matt's rescue after Cha asked the latter out on a surf date. However, the barista considers ditching the plan when Ime disapproves of her action.
5	"MattCha"	December 10, 2024
Matt ends up enjoying his surf date with Cha. An untoward incident brings them closer, but those around them seem unhappy about it. Later, Cha makes a realization.
6	"Sus"	December 16, 2024
Cha's suspicions about Matt grow stronger as they become text mates while recovering from their sprains. To confirm her hunch, the barista pays her friend a surprise visit, only to lead to more confusion.
7	"Yellow There Mysteryoso"	December 17, 2024
Cha finally confirms that the person standing before her is not the same Matt she met online. After a heartfelt talk with Marian, Matt goes out of his way to find Cha and confess.
8	"Breadcrumbing"	December 23, 2024
Matt finds it difficult to come clean to Cha as they spend more time together at the coffee farm. However, a sudden request will bring them back to square one.
9	"Confused Hearts"	December 24, 2024
Refusing to ruin the happy moment he shares with Cha, Matt once again decides to postpone his confession and instead tries to boost JR's image with her. However, to Matt's surprise and confusion, Cha agrees to meet JR and go on a date with him.
10	"Basted"	December 30, 2024
Matt is forced to do the right thing when JR fails to come clean to Cha, only to hurt the barista's feelings unintentionally. Meanwhile, Marian discovers an anomaly under JR's watch and reports it to Leandro.
11	"Catching Feelings"	December 31, 2024
Struggles to accept that she is catching feelings for the real Matt, despite the deceit. Despite doing the right thing, guilt weighs heavily on Matt for hurting two of the most important people in his life.
12	"Manifesting"	January 6, 2025
JR apologizes to Cha and learns that Ayat Blends is about to close down. While JR plans to take advantage of Cha's dilemma to win her over, Matt finds a thoughtful way to help her and the displaced workers.
13	"Trabahohol"	January 7, 2025
Despite her initial rejection, Cha decides to accept the job offer at Legacy Cafe for the sake of her team. Matt tries to be professional with Cha on her first day, while Marian reunites with Vivian after receiving a task from Leandro.
14	"Special Treatment"	January 13, 2025
Despite Matt's effort to clear the air between them, Cha remains reluctant as she becomes determined to fight her growing feelings for him. Meanwhile, JR seizes an opportunity to get closer to Cha, causing Matt to seethe with jealousy.
15	"One Shot"	January 14, 2025
JR finds a new opportunity to spend time alone with Cha. This time, Matt refuses to let them be, even going so far as to see JR flirting with the girl he likes.
16	"Best Man"	January 20, 2025
With her parents' support, Cha grows determined to revive Ayat Blends Café. Matt confesses his true feelings for Cha to JR and finally decides to pursue her. Unwilling to back down, JR steps up his game-both at work and in winning Cha's heart.
17	"Lost and Found"	January 21, 2025
When Cha loses her precious necklace, Matt and JR both rush to help her find it, each with their own approach to winning her favor. While JR spends more time with Cha at work, Matt focuses on making amends with Cha's parents.
18	"Perfectly Imperfect"	January 27, 2025
Seeing JR feeling down after a tense confrontation with his father, Cha steps in as a friend. Upon learning of JR's dilemma, Matt, without hesitation, rushes to his aid, which leads Cha to a new lead in the scam that started it all.
19	"Sigma Wars"	January 28, 2025
JR takes Cha to the beach to keep her from going to the precinct. A surfing match breaks out when Ime spots Cha and JR together and orders Matt to separate them.
20	"And the Winner Is"	February 3, 2025
A love triangle unfolds as two close friends compete for the same woman's affection, while she grapples with their growing rivalry amid an ongoing fraud investigation.
21	"Passenger Princess"	February 4, 2025
Not wanting to put too much pressure on Cha, Matt and JR set aside their differences and reach a compromise. JR is frozen in place upon hearing the news of Jackie Bartolome's arrest.
22	"Red Alert"	February 10, 2025
Cha and Matt's trip to the precinct proves futile when the authorities refuse to let her speak with Jackie Bartolome. As the case begins to take its toll on Cha, JR and Matt decide to call a truce.
23	"White Flag"	February 11, 2025
After Cha's alarming panic attack, Matt makes a thoughtful gesture to help her feel better. Later, Matt overhears JR's phone conversation and finally discovers his friend's true colors.
24	"The Truth Will Set You Free"	February 17, 2025
Setting aside his feelings, Matt tries to make Cha understand where JR is coming from. Leandro promises to stand by his son upon learning of his situation.
25	"Night 2 Remember"	February 18, 2025
Matt and JR face off once again, this time in a coffee-making contest during Legacy's anniversary night. As this year's best barista, Cha gets the final say in selecting the winning brew-and ultimately, the man who will win her heart.

== Production ==
=== Casting ===
This is the third project Belle Mariano and Donny Pangilinan, often addressed as "DonBelle", worked together as main lead, after He's Into Her and their Netflix release Can't Buy Me Love.

== Release ==
The series released worldwide on Viu on November 25, 2024 and consists of 25 episodes.

It had its TV broadcast release starting January 27, 2025 on Kapamilya Channel, A2Z, and TV5.

== Awards and nominations ==
Award ceremony	Year	Category	Nominee	Result	Ref.
Asian Academy Creative Awards	2025	Best Original Programme by a Streamer/OTT (National)	How to Spot a Red Flag	Won	
