= Exes Baggage =

- Theatrical film poster
- Directed by: Dan Villegas
- Written by: Dwein Baltazar
- Produced by: Elma S. Medua
- Starring: Angelica Panganiban; Carlo Aquino
- Cinematography: Carlos Mauricio
- Edited by: Marya Ignacio
- Music by: Arlene Flerida Calvo
- Production company: Black Sheep Productions
- Distributed by: ABS-CBN Film Productions
- Release date: September 26, 2018
- Running time: 104 minutes
- Country: Philippines
- Language: Filipino
- Box office: ₱355.50 million (International)

Exes Baggage is a 2018 Filipino romantic comedy-drama film directed by Dan Villegas from a screenplay written by Dwein Baltazar. The film stars Angelica Panganiban and Carlo Aquino as their reunion project.

Produced by Black Sheep Productions as their initial offering and distributed by ABS-CBN Films, the film was theatrically released on September 26, 2018.

== Plot ==
The story begins two years after the breakup between Pia and Nix Cabangon, and they are invited to a party hosted by the married couple, Reyna and Tops. It shows some flashbacks where Pia and Reyna gazed at Nix at the bar, which led Pia to begin their romantic relationship with Nix after they both explained their main problems about their exes and Nix's hospitality to her. As soon as Pia sees Migs and his family at a superstore, Nix becomes jealous, which leads them to have a fall-out with each other at their home and mentions Nix's ex-girlfriend Dwein. Nix soon apologizes to Pia for his rash behavior and mentions his ex. As Dwein showed up with Tops for the furniture she wanted for Nix, this caused Pia to get jealous, realizing that Nix still had feelings for her and she was the main reason why Pia had broken up with Nix.

Back in the present day, the two reintroduced themselves after their breakup until Tops' announcement to have a second baby (calling Reyna his first "baby") with Reyna as the band plays the song that Nix sang for Pia in their previous relationship. When both Pia and Nix almost kissed, it was revealed that Pia already has a boyfriend named Anton, who called her to come home, which caused Pia to leave the party. As Pia gets inside the car to drive home, Nix shows up to say goodbye to her while calling her car "Ogie" (Pia named it at the beginning of the film). Pia refuses to call back Anton and decides to reconcile with Nix.

== Cast ==
- Angelica Panganiban as Pia
- Carlo Aquino as Nix
- Dionne Monsanto as Reyna
- Joem Bascon as Migs (Pia's ex-boyfriend)
- Coleen Garcia as Dwein (Nix's ex-girlfriend)

== Release ==
The film released its one-minute teaser in the production company's Facebook page on August 4, 2018, and the video garnered almost 2 million views. The second teaser was released via the production company's Facebook page on September 1, 2018, where the theatrical released date is also revealed, releasing the film theatrically on September 26, 2018.

== Reception ==
=== Box office ===
Exes Baggage earned an estimated amount of ₱21.6 million on its first day of showing. As of October 5, 2018, the film earned ₱206,693,044.73 domestically.

The film earned a total of ₱355.50 million in domestic and international showings as of October 23, 2018.
