= Third World Romance =

2023 romantic comedy film by Dwein Baltazar

- Theatrical release poster
- Directed by: Dwein Ruedas Baltazar
- Written by: Dwein Ruedas Baltazar; Jericho Aguado
- Produced by: Kookai Libayen; Benedict O. Mendoza; Maria Kristina Cruz
- Starring: Carlo Aquino; Charlie Dizon
- Cinematography: Kara Moreno
- Edited by: Marya Ignacio
- Music by: Vincent De Jesus
- Production companies: Black Sheep; ANIMA
- Distributed by: ABS-CBN Film Productions
- Release date: 16 August 2023
- Running time: 112 minutes
- Country: Philippines
- Language: Filipino

Third World Romance is a 2023 Philippine romantic comedy film co-written and directed by Dwein Baltazar. The film stars Carlo Aquino and Charlie Dizon in the lead roles, with the supporting cast includes Ana Abad Santos, Archie Adamos, and Gardo Versoza. The story follows two blue-collar workers who meet at the height of the COVID-19 pandemic and they become co-employees at a grocery store. However, their budding romance is beset by persistent economic difficulties.

Produced by Black Sheep Productions and ANIMA and distributed by ABS-CBN Film Productions, it was released theatrically on 16 August 2023.

== Synopsis ==
The story follows a young couple, Britney, an outspoken cashier, and Alvin, a laid-back grocery bagger, who try to navigate the arduous task of choosing to be happy despite the hardships of life and the daily struggles of being blue-collar workers in a bleak, pandemic world.

== Cast and characters ==
- Carlo Aquino as Alvin: A laid-back bagger at Wynn Grocery.
- Charlie Dizon as Britney: An outspoken cashier at Wynn Grocery.
- Ana Abad Santos as Ging: Britney's mother, who works as an OFW
- Gardo Versoza as Dada Mix
- Archi Adamos as Dodong: The supervisor of Wynn Grocery
- Iyah Mina as Inang Reyna
- Esnyr Ranollo as Ashley
- Xilhouete as Ninang
- Brian Black as Trixie
- Lady Morgana as Crimson
- Junjun Quintana as Nelson
- Donna Cariaga as Maymay
- Milo Elmido Jr. as Kandy

== Production ==
The film was announced by Black Sheep Productions. Carlo Aquino and Charlie Dizon were cast to appear in the film. The trailer of the film was released on July 31, 2023. The film was screened at the 19th Cinemalaya Independent Film Festival as the closing film.

== Reception ==
=== Critical reception ===
Fred Hawson, writing for ABS-CBN News, gave praise for the acting performances of Carlo Aquino and Charlie Dizon, with the former "can still pull off the youthful energy of a guy" despite being in his late thirties. However, he gave criticism for its production design which he deemed as "problematic". Le Baltar, writing for The Philippine Star, also gave praise to the lead stars where Carlo Aquino delivered "an effortless and convincing work, brimming with charm and playfulness that is simply hard to dismiss" and Charlie Dizon's mastering her acting skills in giving her character a "richer inner life" and great use of emotions in which the critic commended. Its written screenplay, Baltazar's direction, Marya Ignacio's editing, and Kara Moreno's cinematography were also praised.

In contrast, Stephanie Mayo, writing for Daily Tribune, rated the film 1.5 out of 5 stars and gave a negative review, saying that it failed "the audience for suggesting something deeper and with more substance, and failing to deliver" and was called as a "cheap romantic comedy film" that is targeted for children and felt it was staged.

=== Accolades ===
Year	Awards	Category	Recipient	Result	Ref.
2024	47th Gawad Urian Awards	Best Actress	Charlie Dizon	Won	
2024	47th Gawad Urian Awards	Best Director	Dwein Ruedas Baltazar	Won	
2024	47th Gawad Urian Awards	Best Music	Vincent de Jesus	Won	
2024	47th Gawad Urian Awards	Best Production Design	Eero Yves Francisco	Won	
2024	7th Eddys	Best Actress	Charlie Dizon	Won	
2024	7th Eddys	Best Musical Score	Vincent de Jesus	Nominated	
2024	2024 FAMAS Awards	Best Actress	Charlie Dizon	Nominated	
2024	2024 FAMAS Awards	Best Cinematography	Kara Moreno	Nominated	
2024	2024 FAMAS Awards	Best Production Design	Third World Romance	Nominated	
2024	4th Pinoy Review Awards	Best Director	Dwein Baltazar	Nominated	
2024	4th Pinoy Review Awards	Best Lead Performance	Charlie Dizon	Nominated	
2024	4th Pinoy Review Awards	Best Cinematography	Kara Moreno	Nominated	

== See also ==
- List of Philippine films of 2023
