= Mahal Kita, Beksman =

2022 Filipino film

- Official film poster
- Directed by: Perci Intalan
- Written by: Fatrick Tabada
- Produced by: Vic del Rosario; Jun Lana; Perci Intalan; Vincent Del Rosario III; Veronique Del Rosario-Corpus
- Starring: Christian Bables; Iana Bernardez; Keempee de Leon; Katya Santos
- Cinematography: Mo Zee
- Edited by: Noah Tonga
- Music by: Emerzon Texon
- Production companies: The IdeaFirst Company; Viva Films; Powerhouse Media Capital
- Distributed by: Viva Films
- Release date: 16 November 2022
- Running time: 106 minutes
- Country: Philippines
- Language: Tagalog

Mahal Kita, Beksman (English: I Love You, Beksman) is a 2022 Filipino romantic comedy film directed by Perci Intalan, with a screenplay by Fatrick Tabada. It is a reversal of a coming out story, where the protagonist Dali is an effeminate heterosexual man who reveals that he is straight, to the shock and dismay of the people around him. It stars Christian Bables, Iana Bernardez, Keempee de Leon, and Katya Santos.

The film was a joint production by The IdeaFirst Company, Viva Films, and Powerhouse Media Capital. The word "Beksman" in the title is a pun between the swardspeak word "beks" (short for "beki" or gay) and the Tagalog slang word "peksman" (I promise).

== Plot ==
Dali is a flamboyant make-up artist and designer. He lives happily with his parents Jaime and Gemma, who are in a platonic marriage, and his adoptive siblings, most of whom are openly gay or trans. They run a successful family-owned beauty salon and boutique. Dali is trying to create what he calls "the gown that will end all gowns," but he lacks a muse. While doing makeup for his client Analyn, he meets her fellow beauty pageant contestant, Angel. Dali falls in love at first sight with Angel.

He helps Angel with a gown mishap. Onstage during the pageant, she gives a speech thanking him, leaving him in awe. His first encounter with Angels inspire him to work on his dream gown. He also has a romantic dream about her. The next day, she invites him to her house so he can help her with her makeup. He finds himself intimidated by Angel's macho brothers and father.

He tries to tell her that he's straight and identifies as a cisgender man. Angel laughs at him, believing it to be a joke. When he insists that he's being serious, she still doesn't believe him. At dinner, he later admits to his family that he's straight. They are horrified by the revelation, and his gay father, Jaime, insists that Dali is just pretending to be straight, like he was forced to do when he was Dali's age.

Dali starts to formally court Angel. He spends much of the film trying to look and act in a macho way. Following an initially successful courtship, he ends up pushing her away due to the toxic masculinity that he develops. After they drift apart, a depressed Dali sheds his macho persona and reverts to his true, effeminate self. Online, he apologizes to Angel and says that he should've spent less time trying to prove that he's straight and more time simply proving how much he loves her. Dali's family finally accepts that he's straight, but Dali also accepts that his gender expression is not traditionally masculine.

In the final scene, Angel reconciles with Dali. Angel, Dali, and both of their families dance to the song "Kapag Tumibok Ang Puso" by Donna Cruz. Angel and Dali almost kiss on the lips, but her strict father humorously interrupts them.

== Cast ==
=== Main cast ===
- Christian Bables as Dali Salvador
- Iana Bernardez as Angel
- Keempee de Leon as Jaime Salvador
- Katya Santos as Gemma Salvador

=== Supporting cast ===
- Joanna Marie Katanyag as Marga (credited as J-Mee Katanyag)
- John Leinard Ramos as Romy (credited as Lei Ramos)
- Donna Cariaga as Analyn
- Migs Almendras as Diego
- Kyo Quijano as Freddie

== Production ==
According to Intalan, the film had a limited production budget. Filming for Beksman wrapped in June 2022.

=== Development ===
According to the openly queer director Intalan, the idea for the film first came about when he discussed "unusual" love stories with his IdeaFirst co-founder and former husband, Jun Lana. Intalan recalled a time in high school when he fell in love with a girl.

He says that other people were puzzled when he courted her, especially because everyone, including the girl, was aware that his entire social circle was openly queer. Despite this, they dated for some time. Screenwriter Tabada fleshed out the anecdote into an original story, upon which Beksman was based.

Intalan has said of the film, "What we're espousing now is to 'Free your mind.' We should no longer label people because we always say, love is love. So this film is actually a reverse of typical stories, and a lot of lessons can be gleaned in accepting someone – whether they be gay or straight."

He intentionally evoked nostalgia for 1980s and 1990s Philippine rom-coms. Many of those films feature Bollywood-like musical numbers. Although Beksman is not a musical film, Intalan says he sought out to create a "colorful, musical, almost fairy-tale-ish world" for its main couple, Dali and Angel. One of the ways that the film evokes nostalgia for those decades is by heavily using the 1990 pop song "Kapag Tumibok Ang Puso" by Donna Cruz. Cruz, who was in a love team with Keempee de Leon during the era, congratulated him and said that her song was perfect for the film. De Leon has expressed his delight in hearing the song again after many years, in a film wherein he is a cast member.

=== Casting ===
Intalan and Lana hand-picked the cast. Intalan says they were already fans of Keempee de Leon and offered the role of Dali's father Jaime through his manager, Malou Fagar, when de Leon was still filming for the teleserye 2 Good 2 Be True. According to Intalan, Keempee de Leon was initially hesitant to join Beksman, because it had been more than a decade since he was in a film.

The cast was first announced in July 2022.

== Release ==
=== Theatrical release ===
The film was released in Philippine cinemas on 16 November 2022. In August 2023, it received a limited release at the Si̇nema Transtopia, an arthouse cinema in Berlin, Germany.

=== Film festivals ===
The film screened at various international film festivals, including:

- The 52nd International Film Festival Rotterdam (IFFR) in Rotterdam, the Netherlands (2023)
- The Queer East Film Festival in London, the United Kingdom (April 2023)
- The New York Asian Film Festival (NYAFF) in New York, the United States (July 2023)
- The Melbourne Queer Film Festival (MQFF) in Melbourne (November 2023)
- The Slovak Queer Film Festival (FFi) in Slovakia (November 2023)
- The Sunny Bunny LGBTQIA+ Film Festival in Ukraine (2023)
- Karawan Fest in Rome, Italy (2024)

In an interview with The Manila Times, director Perci Intalan also mentioned that it screened at an unspecified festival in Seoul, South Korea.

=== Streaming ===
In March 2023, the film premiered on Amazon Prime Video in select territories.

== Critical reception ==
Mahal Kita, Beksman received generally favorable reviews. Although many reviews criticized the highly campy style of the film and the lack of character material for Iana Bernardez, its ensemble cast garnered universal acclaim for their performances in local and international reviews alike.

Mario Bautista of Journal News Online praised Tabada's "original and well paced screenplay that never lags." He declared it Intalan's "best work to date." He also commended the cast's "uniformly splendid" acting. Goldwin Reviews gave the film 4 stars out of 5. They praised Bables' performance, but said that Bernardez was underused.

In a review for NYAFF, Leon Overee of Asian Movie Pulse praised Carmela Danao and Emilio Medrano's "brilliant" set design, describing Beksman as a "candy land" that "glitters with pure energy." He criticized Tabada's screenplay for being "one-dimensional." In a separate review for FFi, Marina Richter of Asian Movie Pulse called Beksman a "strange film with an awkwardly plotted love story." Nonetheless, she praised the cast, ascribing the film's "joy factor" to their "great" performances.

Like Overee, Wally Adams of Eastern Kicks made note of the film's "rainbow-hued" set design. He wrote that "I Love You, Beksman has more to say and is able to do more with its concept than many movies that take themselves far more seriously can successfully tackle." He singled out Bables, de Leon, Bernardez, and Katanyag's performances as standouts. Adams concluded that the film was "likably giddy" and "befittingly timely."

Basil Baradaran (The Asian Cinema Critic) wrote that Beksman "toes the lines between tiresome and charming, never really landing in one particular spot." He praised the cast, whom he described as "all delightful and a joy to watch." He said that the viewing experience was "a little like watching your favourite sitcom that hasn't aged particularly well but that you'll always love." Writing for Pink News, Asyia Iftikhar described the film as "a refreshing addition to the genre of LGBTQ+ film." She commended its "beautifully optimistic" ending.

Jennie Kermode of Eye for Film called Beksman "a joyous, life-affirming film," giving it 3.5 stars out of 5. Rich Cline (Shadows on the Wall) gave the film 4 stars out of 5, comparing it to the French classic La Cage aux Folles. He called Bables "hugely charming" as Dali and praised the cast for "each[…] find[ing] an engaging spark of personality to bring their characters to vivid life."

== Awards and nominations ==
Year	Award	Category	Nominee(s)	Result	Ref.
2023	The 39th Luna Awards	Best Picture	Mahal Kita, Beksman	Nominated	
2023	The 39th Luna Awards	Best Director	Perci Intalan	Nominated	
2023	The 39th Luna Awards	Best Actor	Christian Bables	Nominated	
2023	The 39th Luna Awards	Best Supporting Actor	Keempee de Leon	Nominated	
2023	The 39th Luna Awards	Best Production Design	Carmela Danao	Nominated	
2023	The 39th Luna Awards	Best Musical Scoring	Emerzon Tecson	Nominated	
2023	The Entertainment Editors' Choice	Best Editing	Noah Tonga	Nominated	
2023	The Entertainment Editors' Choice	Best Musical Score	Emerzon Tecson	Nominated	
2023	The Sunny Bunny LGBTQIA+ Film Festival Audience Prize	Best Director	Perci Intalan	Nominated	
2023	Online Film Critics Society Awards	Best Non-US Release (Philippines)	Mahal Kita, Beksman	Won	
