= Open (2019 film) =

2019 Philippine romance drama

- Theatrical release poster
- Directed by: Andoy Ranay
- Screenplay by: Dwein Baltazar; Katherine S. Labayen; Wanggo Gallaga
- Story by: Wanggo Galaga
- Produced by: Carlo L. Katigbak; Olivia M. Lamasan; Rex A. Tiri; Kriz G. Gazmen; Marjorie B. Lachica; Petersen Vargas
- Starring: JC Santos; Arci Muñoz
- Cinematography: Nor Domingo
- Edited by: Apol Dating
- Music by: Teresa Barrozo
- Production companies: Black Sheep Productions; T-Rex Entertainment
- Distributed by: ABS-CBN Film Productions
- Release date: September 13, 2019
- Running time: 113 minutes
- Country: Philippines
- Language: Filipino
- Box office: ₱2,252,670.70 (opening)

Open is a 2019 Philippine romance drama film directed by Andoy Ranay from a story and screenplay written by Wanggo Gallaga, with Dwein Baltazar and Katherine S. Labayen as co-writers of the latter. The film stars JC Santos and Arci Muñoz, with the supporting cast include Ina Raymundo, Sofia Andres, Ivana Alawi, Alexa Ilacad, and Troy Montero.

Produced by Black Sheep Productions and T-Rex Entertainment and distributed by Star Cinema, the film was theatrically released on September 13, 2019, one of the entries for the Pista ng Pelikulang Pilipino 2019.

== Synopsis ==
Rome (Muñoz) and Ethan (Santos) have been together for 14 years. He is the love of her life, and she is his number one supporter. They are each other's firsts, and to their friends, they are the perfect couple. When the two begin to feel that their relationship has gone stale, they explore the idea of going open. It's something Ethan wants to do, and it's the only way Rome feels she can keep her man. They agree that they are allowed to have sex with strangers, but they are not allowed to fall in love. In a relationship built over time, the two begin to “explore” expecting to salvage the same thing they are giving up. In the end, they learn the importance of the very thing they have been blind to -- a relationship without trust will eventually crumble.

== Cast ==
=== Main cast ===
- JC Santos as Ethan
- Arci Muñoz as Romina / Rome

=== Supporting cast ===
- Ina Raymundo as Erika
- Sofia Andres as Mia
- Ivana Alawi as Monique
- Jenny Miller as Mica
- Alexa Ilacad as Mika
- Vance Larena as Archie
- Troy Montero as Norman
- Micah Muñoz as Sam
- Mark McMahon as Kevin
- Frances Makil-Ignacio as Carla
- Erika Padilla as Shiela
- Che Ramos as EM
- Ross Pesigan as Daniel
- Ge Villamil as Estelle
- Rosalind Wee as Mrs. Sanchez

== Release ==
The film was released on September 13, 2019, during the 3rd Pista ng Pelikulang Pilipino.
