= AWOL (2017 film) =

- Theatrical release poster
- Directed by: Enzo Williams
- Screenplay by: Shugo Praico; Ed Samson
- Story by: Richard G. Reynante; Michael S. Bernaldez
- Produced by: Charo Santos-Concio; Malou N. Santos; Richard G. Reynante
- Starring: Gerald Anderson; Dianne Medina; Raymond Bagatsing; Bembol Roco; Richard Quan; Jeric Raval
- Cinematography: Carlo Mendoza
- Edited by: Mai Calapardo; Enzo Williams
- Music by: Von de Guzman
- Production companies: Skylight Films; CineBro
- Distributed by: ABS-CBN Films
- Release date: August 16, 2017
- Country: Philippines
- Language: Filipino

AWOL is a 2017 Philippine action thriller film directed and co-edited by Enzo Williams and written by Shugo Praico and Ed Samson from a story by Richard G. Reynante and Michael S. Bernaldez. The film stars Gerald Anderson.

== Synopsis ==
Lt. Abel Ibarra (Gerald Anderson), a leader of an elite sniper group, protects his family from a man who plots a revenge to kill him and his love ones after accomplishing mission. Ibarra went on an absence without leave to make an investigation on a crime himself.

== Plot ==
In the opening, a foreign terrorist Saheed executes a bound man after taking a bagful of money. Abel, alongside his team was inserted to neutralize the foreign terrorist. The mission is successful, but the terrorist committed suicide.

Back at a restaurant, during their celebration of a fellow team member's child's christening, a bomb explodes just as Abel and his wife exits, killing all his team members. An old man berated his men for their failure. He swore justice upon his fellows. He tried to plead for clues, but his superior was mum about it, instead giving it to a police officer. Later that night, a group of men attacked his house, killing the guards, but neutralized. Abel sustained a wound on the assault. In the hospital, he tried to extract info on a surviving suspect, but an assassin disguised as a nurse, killed him, then fled.

The military listed him as AWOL. Then he investigated the incident, his way. He went on assassinating his enemies one by one. First, an escaped convict named Mallari who pointed a rogue policeman Delgado. Then Delgado was killed at his hideout after he took call from Amang's (Bembol Roco) subordinate Victor (Bernard Palanca). He died trying to take a child hostage, but he blurted that Abel's team eliminated Amang's son Armando, who was with Saheed's side, who dies when he committed suicide by grenade. He thwarts an attempt on his family's life, killing the same assassin who attacked him on the hospital, then threatens Amang over the assassin's phone. Then Abel went on to Amang's hideout, kills his lackeys, then kills Amang after a confrontation. He returns to his family, and his superior officer covered up his tracks, saying that the AWOL status was a miscommunication.

Before the film ends, he killed Victor painfully, by shooting him limb by limb and finally shooting him on the head, and calls his wife that he is coming home. The policeman who investigates the assassinations walks out of the crime scene after an investigation.

== Cast ==
- Gerald Anderson as Lt. Abel Ibarra
- Dianne Medina as Abel's wife, Lara
- Raymond Bagatsing
- Bembol Roco as Amang
- Richard Quan as P/CPT. Jose Castro
- Jeric Raval as Waldo the arms dealer
- Bernard Palanca as Victor
- Lawrence Pineda as Army Capt. Daguman

== Production ==
AWOL was directed by Enzo Williams. Williams meant to use the film as to promote appreciation for the Philippines' soldiers by Filipinos similar to Americans' positive treatment to its soldiers as observed by Williams.

Personnel from the Special Action Force of the Philippine National Police worked with the production staff for eleven days. The film makers also worked with the Armed Forces of the Philippines which trained Anderson on weapons handling. Principal photography for the film began on March 16, 2016.

== Release ==
AWOL had a special screening for wounded Filipino soldiers. The film had a positive reception from the soldiers according to lead actor, Anderson.

The film made its Philippine premiere on August 16, 2017, as one of the twelve entries at the 2017 Pista ng Pelikulang Pilipino.
