= Nang Mapagod si Kamatayan =

Upcoming film by Dan Villegas

- Teaser poster
- Directed by: Dan Villegas
- Screenplay by: Carmi Raymundo
- Story by: Ricky Lee
- Based on: Nang Mapagod si Kamatayan by Ricky Lee
- Starring: Daniel Padilla; Zanjoe Marudo
- Production companies: ABS-CBN Studios; Quantum Films
- Distributed by: Star Cinema
- Country: Philippines
- Language: Filipino

Nang Mapagod si Kamatayan (transl. when death gets tired) is an upcoming Philippine buddy comedy film directed by Dan Villegas from a short story of the same name written by Ricky Lee and adapted into a screenplay by Carmi G. Raymundo. It stars Daniel Padilla and Zanjoe Marudo. The film is based on the fourth story with the same title in Ricky Lee's book Kung Alam Nyo Lang.

== Cast ==
- Daniel Padilla
- Zanjoe Marudo

== Production ==
During the event on April 27, 2023, Star Cinema announced Daniel Padilla's comeback film titled Nang Mapagod si Kamatayan together with Zanjoe Marudo. It is directed by Dan Villegas with Carmi Raymundo adapting Ricky Lee's story into a screenplay. Vanessa Valdez serves as a creative manager.

=== Filming ===
In October 2023, ABS-CBN News reported that the cast and crew are started filming. However, in November 2024, it was reported that they had not yet actually begun principal shooting by that time. The actors had done a story conference and were preparing, but the shoot was still being organized and was delayed because the team wanted to polish the script, concept, and details before moving forward.
