= Graceland (2012 film) =

Graceland is a 2012 Filipino drama film directed and written by Roy Morales. The film premiered at the 2012 Tribeca Film Festival, and was released on April 26, 2013, in the Philippines. It was also screened in the US, earning $20,791 after a month of its release.

== Plot ==
Marlon Villar (Arnold Reyes), a driver for a politician, whose daughter (Ella Guevara) is accidentally kidnapped, does everything he can to save her, while being enmeshed in a web of crime and corruption.

== Cast ==
- Arnold Reyes as Marlon Villar
- Menggie Cobarrubias as Mr. Manuel Changho
- Dido de la Paz as Detective Ramos
- Leon Miguel as Visel
- Ella Guevara as Elvie Villar
- Marife Necesito as Mrs. Marcy Chango
- Angie Ferro as ChiChi's Grandmother
