= 2020 Pista ng Pelikulang Pilipino =

2020 film festival in the Philippines

2020 Pista ng Pelikulang Pilipino 4th Pista ng Pelikulang Pilipino
- No. of films: 10 (Note: "Premium Selection" non-restored films only)
- Festival date: November 22 – December 13, 2020 (Note: Screening for feature films. Short films were made available as early as October 31.)

PPP chronology
- 2021 2019

The 2020 Pista ng Pelikulang Pilipino (PPP; transl. Festival of Filipino Films) is the 4th edition of the annual Pista ng Pelikulang Pilipino, organized by the Film Development Council of the Philippines.

Due to the COVID-19 pandemic, the film festival's entries were not screened live in cinemas. Instead, the entry films (both feature and short films) were made available through online streaming from October 31 to December 13, 2020. Short films was made available first with feature-length films released on November 22, 2020.

== Entry films ==
Only "premium" films which had a Philippine premiere at the PPP and those films with limited screening in 2019 are eligible for awards.

=== PPP Premium Selection ===
Title	Director
Feature films
Ang Lakaran ni Kabunyan: Kabunyan’s Journey to Liwanag	Kidlat Tahimik
Blood Hunters: Rise of the Hybrids	Vincent Soberano
Cleaners	Glenn Barit
Come On, Irene	Keisuke Yoshida
He Who Is Without Sin	Jason Paul Laxamana
Kintsugi	Lawrence Fajardo
Metamorphosis	J.E. Tiglao
Sila-Sila	Giancarlo Abrahan
The Helper	Joanna Bowers
The Highest Peak	Arbi Barbarona
Restored films
Batch '81 (1982)	Mike de Leon
Brutal (1980)	Marilou Diaz-Abaya
Markova: Comfort Gay (2000)	Gil Portes
