= Oggs Cruz =

Filipino lawyer and film critic

Francis Joseph "Oggs" Cruz is a Filipino lawyer and film critic best known for his reviews of Philippine New Wave films in prominent publications including the Philippine Star, the Philippines Free Press and Rappler.

Cruz's reviews have led him to be invited to join the selection committees of several major Philippine festivals, including the Cinema One Originals Film Festival, the Pista ng Pelikulang Pilipino and the Cinemalaya Philippine Independent Film Festival.

Cruz was a member of the selection committee of the Cinemalaya Philippine Independent Film Festival, but resigned in 2012 in protest over the exclusion of one of the films nominated under the New breed category that year.

== See also ==
- Philbert Dy
