= Online Film Critics Society Awards 2023 =

27th Online Film Critics Society Awards

27th Online Film Critics Society Awards
- Date: January 22, 2024

Highlights
- Best Picture: Oppenheimer
- Most awards: Oppenheimer (8)
- Most nominations: Oppenheimer (12)

The 27th Online Film Critics Society Awards, honoring the best in film for 2023, were announced on January 22, 2024. The nominations were announced on January 17, 2024.

Oppenheimer led the nominations with twelve, followed by Killers of the Flower Moon and Poor Things with eleven each.

== Winners and nominees ==
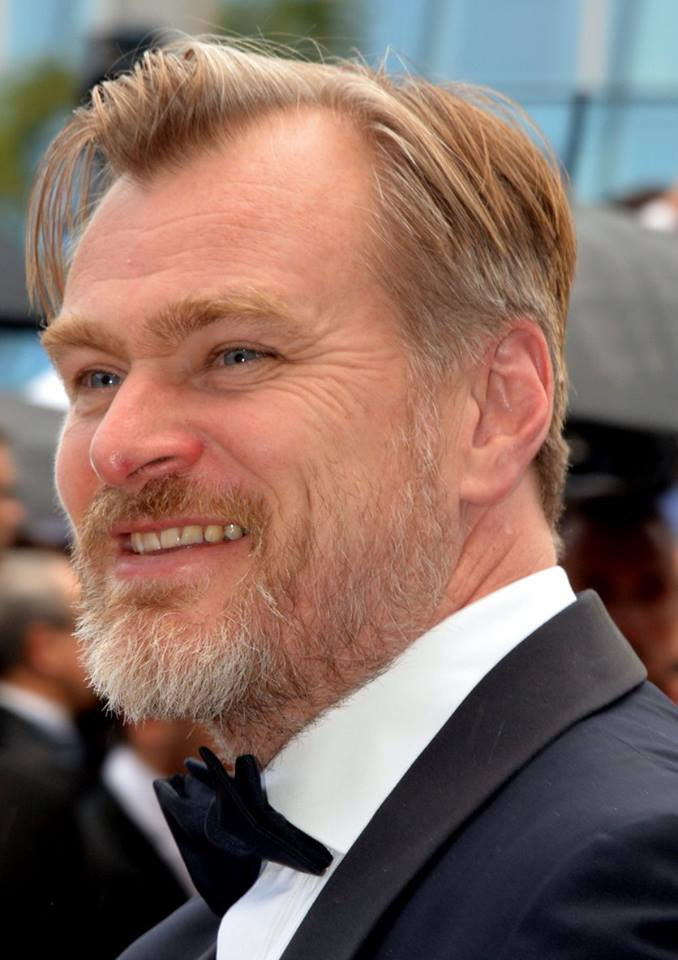
Christopher Nolan, Best Director and Best Adapted Screenplay winner

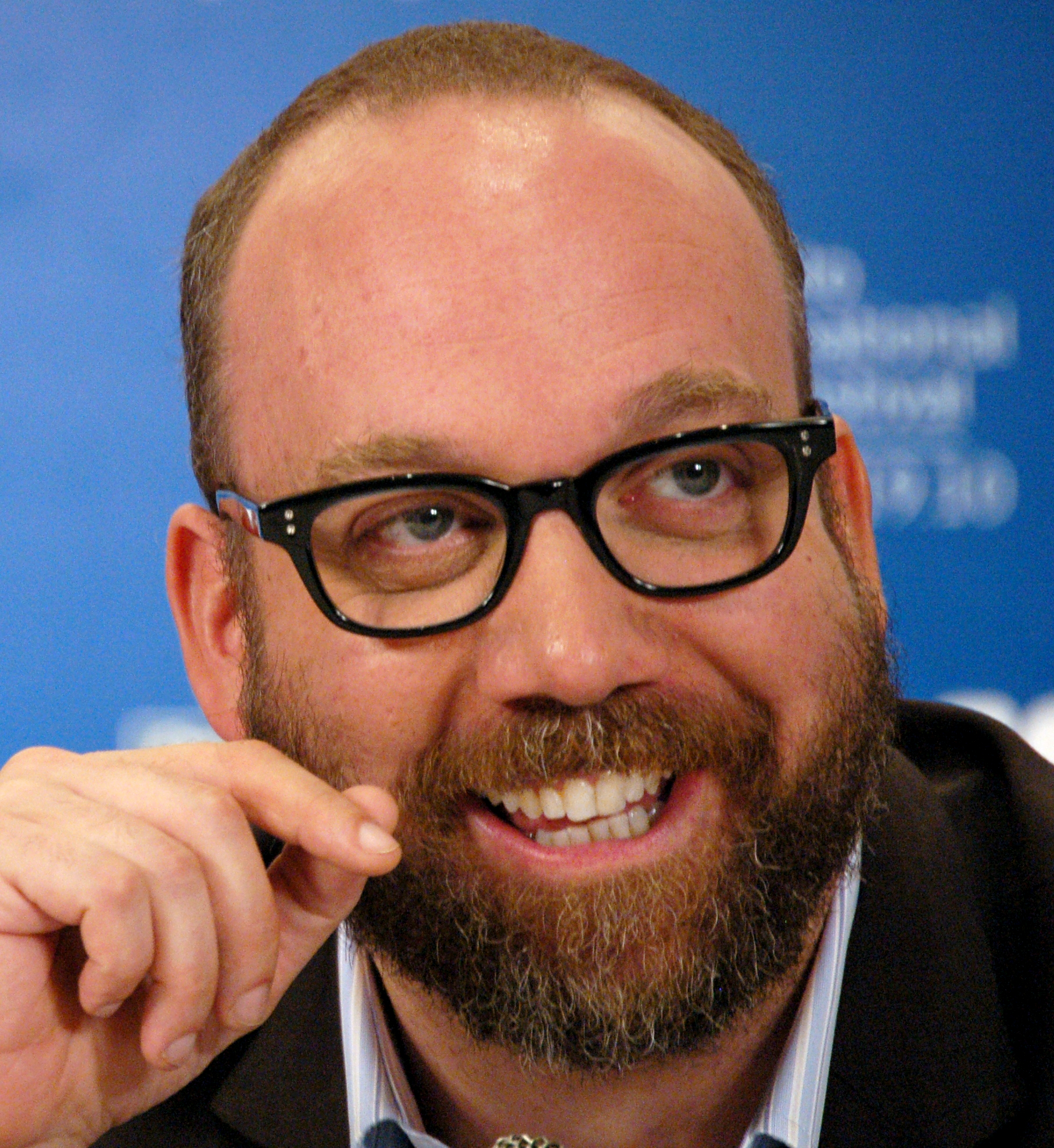
Paul Giamatti, Best Actor winner

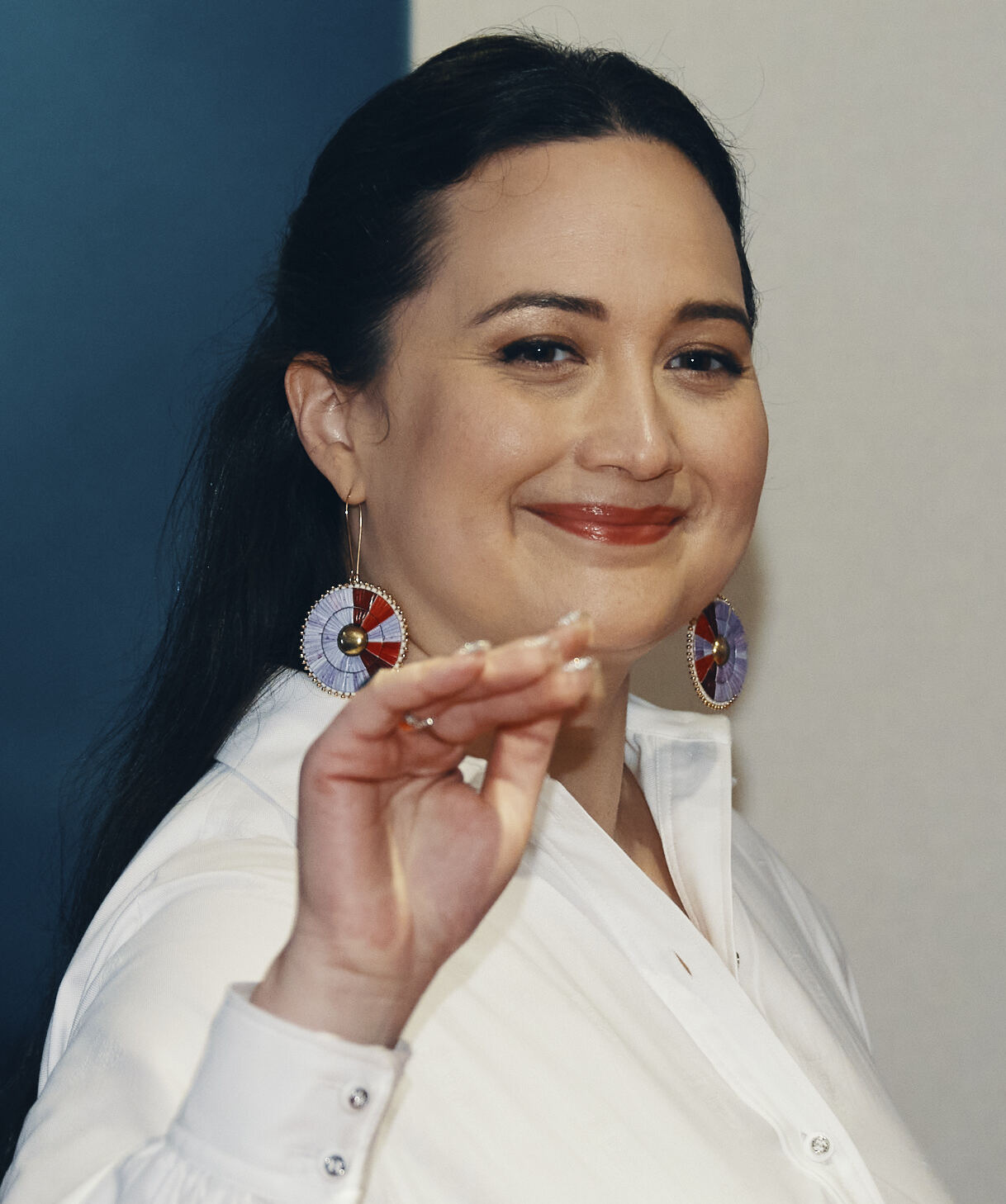
Lily Gladstone, Best Actress winner

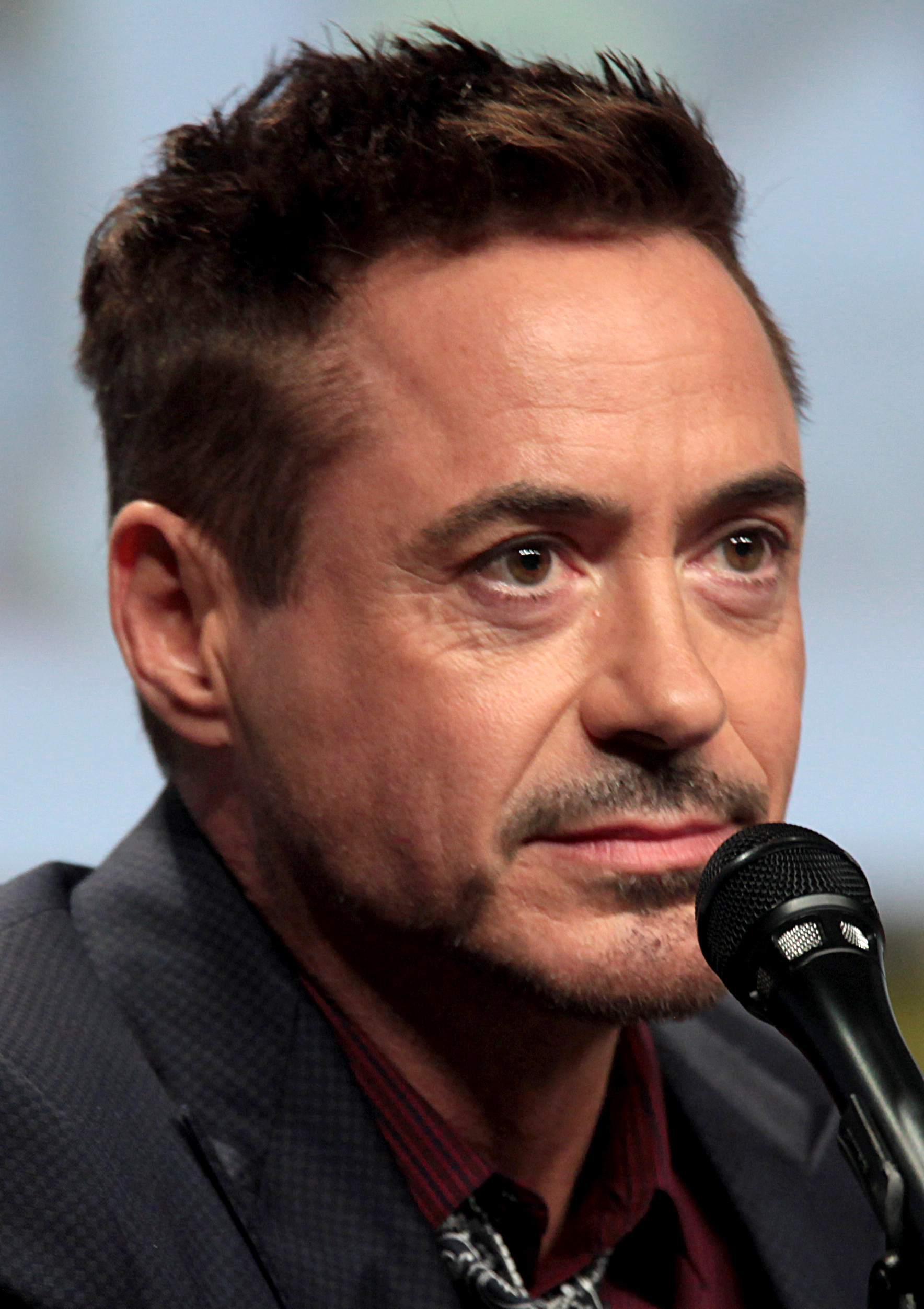
Robert Downey Jr., Best Supporting Actor winner

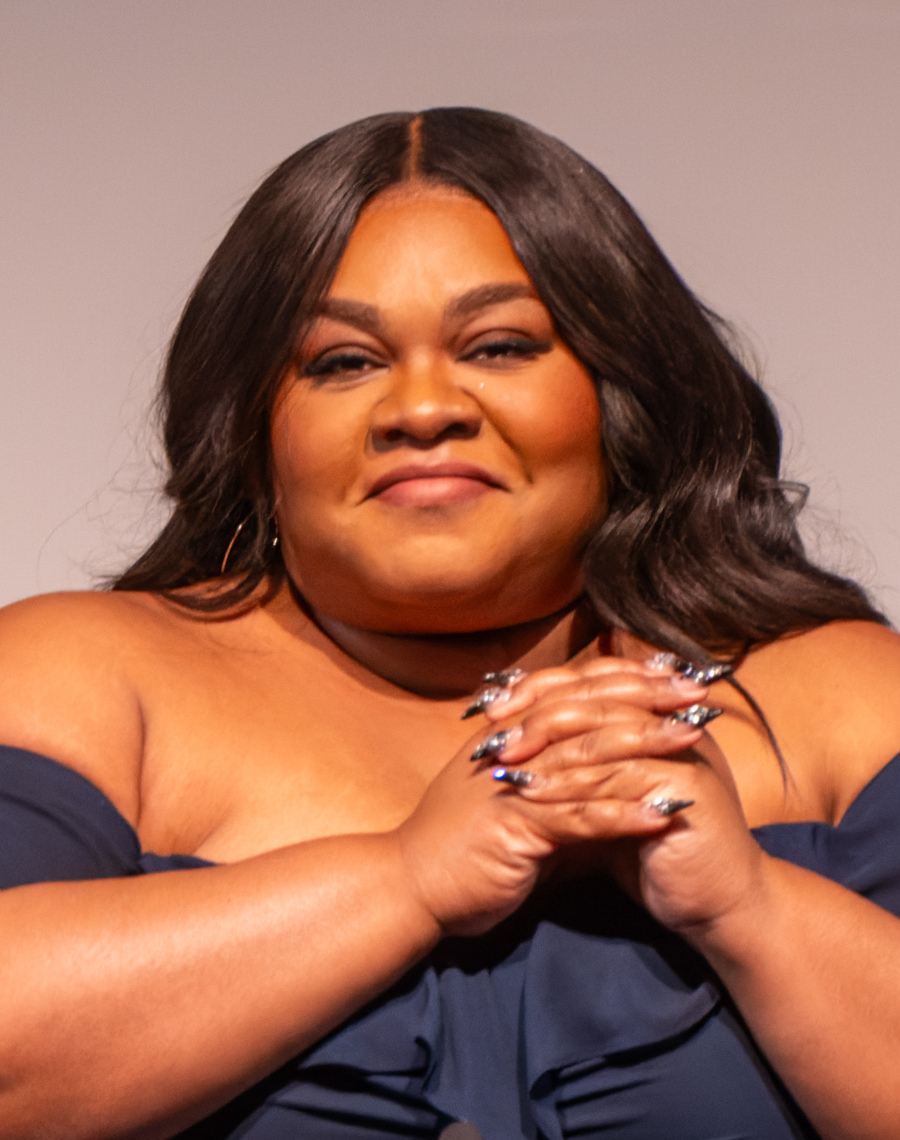
Da'Vine Joy Randolph, Best Supporting Actress winner

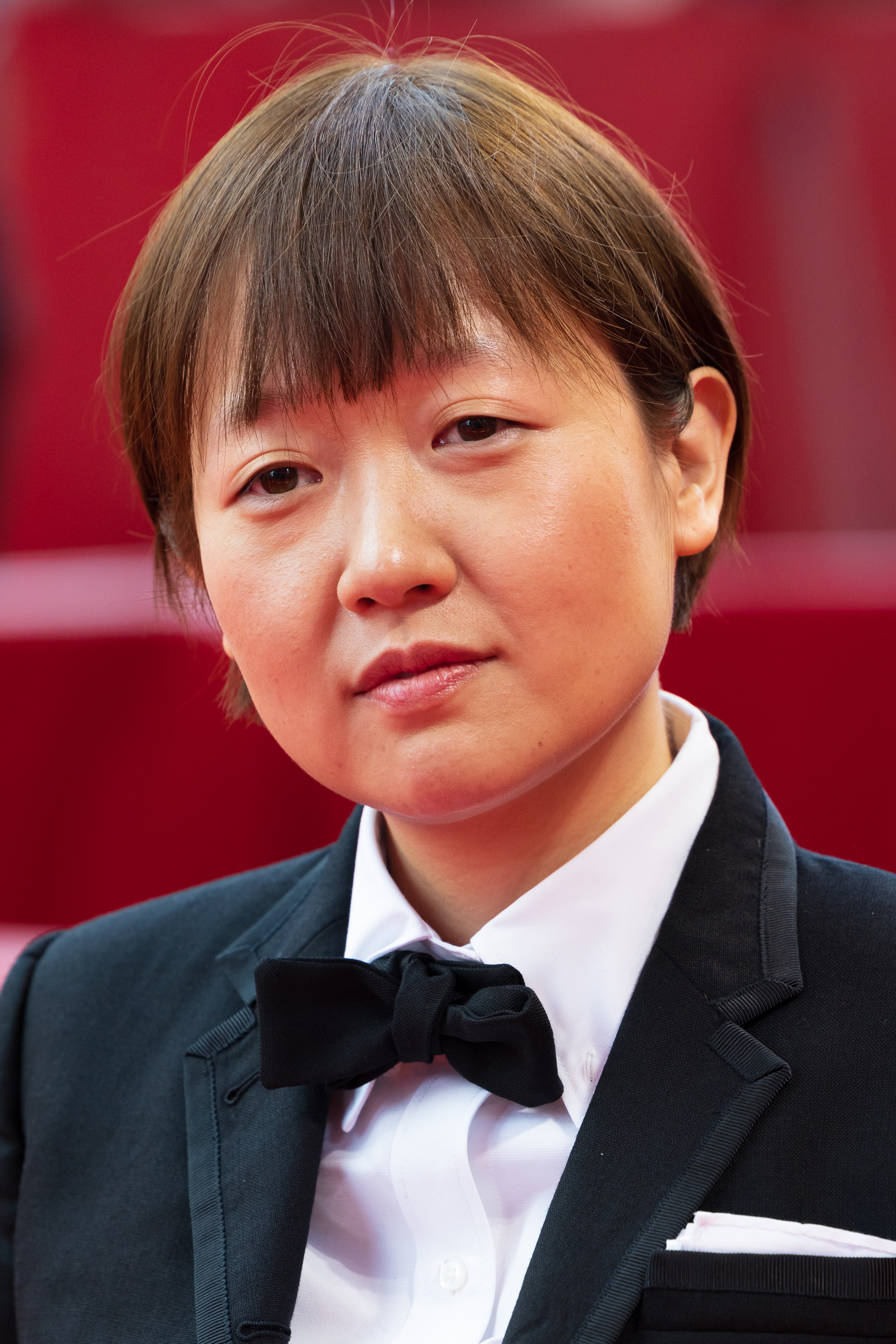
Celine Song, Best Debut Feature winner

Best Picture	Best Director
1. Oppenheimer; 2. Killers of the Flower Moon; 3. The Holdovers; 4. Poor Things; 5. Anatomy of a Fall; 6. Barbie; 7. Past Lives; 8. May December; 9. Asteroid City; 10. The Zone of Interest	Christopher Nolan – Oppenheimer; Greta Gerwig – Barbie; Yorgos Lanthimos – Poor Things; Martin Scorsese – Killers of the Flower Moon; Celine Song – Past Lives
Best Actor	Best Actress
Paul Giamatti – The Holdovers as Paul Hunham; Leonardo DiCaprio – Killers of the Flower Moon as Ernest Burkhart; Cillian Murphy – Oppenheimer as J. Robert Oppenheimer; Andrew Scott – All of Us Strangers as Adam; Jeffrey Wright – American Fiction as Thelonious "Monk" Ellison	Lily Gladstone – Killers of the Flower Moon as Mollie Burkhart; Sandra Hüller – Anatomy of a Fall as Sandra Voyter; Greta Lee – Past Lives as Nora Moon; Margot Robbie – Barbie as Barbie; Emma Stone – Poor Things as Bella Baxter
Best Supporting Actor	Best Supporting Actress
Robert Downey Jr. – Oppenheimer as Lewis Strauss; Robert De Niro – Killers of the Flower Moon as William King Hale; Ryan Gosling – Barbie as Ken; Charles Melton – May December as Joe Yoo; Mark Ruffalo – Poor Things as Duncan Wedderburn	Da'Vine Joy Randolph – The Holdovers as Mary Lamb; Emily Blunt – Oppenheimer as Kitty Oppenheimer; Danielle Brooks – The Color Purple as Sofia; Rachel McAdams – Are You There God? It's Me, Margaret. as Barbara Simon; Julianne Moore – May December as Gracie
Best Animated Feature	Best Film Not in the English Language
Spider-Man: Across the Spider-Verse; The Boy and the Heron; Nimona; Robot Dreams; Teenage Mutant Ninja Turtles: Mutant Mayhem	Anatomy of a Fall; Fallen Leaves; Godzilla Minus One; Perfect Days; The Zone of Interest
Best Documentary	Best Debut Feature
20 Days in Mariupol; American Symphony; Beyond Utopia; Kokomo City; Still: A Michael J. Fox Movie	Celine Song – Past Lives; Raven Jackson – All Dirt Roads Taste of Salt; Cord Jefferson – American Fiction; Danny and Michael Philippou – Talk to Me; A. V. Rockwell – A Thousand and One
Best Original Screenplay	Best Adapted Screenplay
David Hemingson – The Holdovers; Samy Burch – May December; Greta Gerwig and Noah Baumbach – Barbie; Celine Song – Past Lives; Justine Triet and Arthur Harari – Anatomy of a Fall	Christopher Nolan – Oppenheimer; Jonathan Glazer – The Zone of Interest; Cord Jefferson – American Fiction; Tony McNamara – Poor Things; Eric Roth and Martin Scorsese – Killers of the Flower Moon
Best Cinematography	Best Editing
Hoyte van Hoytema – Oppenheimer; Rodrigo Prieto – Barbie; Rodrigo Prieto – Killers of the Flower Moon; Robbie Ryan – Poor Things; Robert Yeoman – Asteroid City	Jennifer Lame – Oppenheimer; Nick Houy – Barbie; Yorgos Mavropsaridis – Poor Things; Thelma Schoonmaker – Killers of the Flower Moon; Laurent Sénéchal – Anatomy of a Fall
Best Costume Design	Best Production Design
Barbie; Asteroid City; Killers of the Flower Moon; Oppenheimer; Poor Things	Barbie; Asteroid City; Killers of the Flower Moon; Oppenheimer; Poor Things
Best Original Score	Best Visual Effects
Ludwig Göransson – Oppenheimer; Jerskin Fendrix – Poor Things; Mica Levi – The Zone of Interest; Daniel Pemberton – Spider-Man: Across the Spider-Verse; Robbie Robertson – Killers of the Flower Moon	Oppenheimer; The Creator; Godzilla Minus One; Mission: Impossible – Dead Reckoning Part One; Poor Things

== Special awards ==
=== Technical Achievement Awards ===
- Barbie – Original Song ("I'm Just Ken")
- Barbie – Original Song ("What Was I Made For?")
- John Wick: Chapter 4 – Stunt Coordination
- Mission: Impossible – Dead Reckoning Part One – Stunt Coordination
- The Taste of Things – Culinary Direction

=== Lifetime Achievement Awards ===
- Jodie Foster (actor)
- Gene Hackman (actor)
- Gale Anne Hurd (producer)
- Hayao Miyazaki (animator/writer/director)
- Thelma Schoonmaker (editor)

=== Special Achievement Awards ===
- Ben Model, for his work in restoring and releasing silent film classics.
- Fran Drescher, president of the Screen Actors Guild, for her diligent negotiation on behalf of working actors in the 2023 SAG-AFTRA strike.
- Members of and President Meredith Stiehm of the Writers Guild of America for persisting in their strike to ensure that the rapidly-changing American film industry will remain a viable source of livelihood for artists.

=== Non-U.S. Releases ===
- Bad Living (Portugal)
- Blackbird Blackbird Blackberry (Georgia)
- Close Your Eyes (Spain)
- Dear Jassi (India)
- Explanation for Everything (Hungary)
- The Girls Are Alright (Spain)
- I Love You, Beksman (Philippines)
- The New Boy (Australia)
- Samsara (Spain)
- Sorcery (Chile)

== Films with multiple nominations and awards ==
Films that received multiple nominations
Nominations	Film
12	Oppenheimer
11	Killers of the Flower Moon
11	Poor Things
9	Barbie
5	Anatomy of a Fall
5	Past Lives
4	Asteroid City
4	The Holdovers
4	May December
4	The Zone of Interest
3	American Fiction
2	Godzilla Minus One
2	Spider-Man: Across the Spider-Verse

Films that received multiple awards
Awards	Film
8	Oppenheimer
4	Barbie
3	The Holdovers
