= Signal Rock =

- Official movie poster
- Directed by: Chito S. Roño
- Written by: Rody Vera
- Produced by: Chito S. Roño
- Starring: Christian Bables; Daria Ramirez; Nanding Josef; Mon Confiado; Elora Españo; Keanna Reeves; Francis Magundayao; Archie Adamos; Sue Prado; Jomari Umpa; Ces Quesada; Kokoy de Santos
- Cinematography: Neil Daza
- Edited by: Carlo Francisco Manatad
- Music by: Erwin Fajardo
- Production company: CSR Productions
- Distributed by: Regal Films
- Release date: August 15, 2018
- Running time: 130 minutes
- Country: Philippines
- Language: Filipino

Signal Rock is a 2018 Filipino independent drama film produced and directed by Chito S. Roño, starring Christian Bables together with an ensemble cast. The film was produced by CSR Productions and distributed by Regal Entertainment on August 15, 2018 which serves as the official entry to the Pista ng Pelikulang Pilipino. It was selected as the Philippine entry for the Best Foreign Language Film at the 91st Academy Awards, but it was not nominated.

Based on a true story and set in 1990s, the film follows Intoy (Bables), as he takes care of his family in Biri, Samar while his sister is overseas and is only able to contact her while atop the strange rock formations on the edge of the island.

== Premise ==
The story follows Intoy (Bables) who lives with his family in Biri, Northern Samar while his sister Vicky works in Finland. Vicky marries a foreigner believing that it will solve their financial problems. In order to contact his sister, Intoy must scramble about the strange rock formations in the island to attain signal, as is it the only location where he can do so. Intoy experiences conflict due to his love for a woman who will soon leave for Manila, his duty in the island, and his ambitions, which include leaving the island for work. Traditionally, women leave the island, while the men stay.

== Cast ==
- Christian Bables as Intoy Abakan
- Daria Ramirez as Alicia Abakan
- Nanding Josef as Jamin Abakan
- Mon Confiado as Damian
- Elora Españo as Rachel
- Keanna Reeves as Gloria
- Francis Magundayao as Bong
- Archie Adamos as Mario
- Sue Prado as Loida
- Jomari Umpa as Kiko
- Ces Quesada as Chona
- Kokoy De Santos as Gabs
- Judy Ann Santos as Vicky Abakan
- Mara Lopez as Gina
- Ruby Ruiz as Mila
- Dido dela Paz
- Arnold Reyes as Joaquin
- Menggie Cobarrubias as Mayor
- Joel Saracho
- JayR Versales
- Lee O'Brian as Finnish Consul

== Awards and nominations ==
Year	Award-giving body	Recipient(s)	Award	Result
2018	2nd Pista ng Pelikulang Pilipino	Signal Rock	Critics' Choice	Won
2018	2nd Pista ng Pelikulang Pilipino	Signal Rock	Special Jury Prize	Won
2018	2nd Pista ng Pelikulang Pilipino	Christian Bables	Best Performance by an Actor	Won
2018	5th Hanoi International Film Festival	Signal Rock	Best Main Actor	Won
2019	17th Dhaka International Film Festival	Rody Vera	Best Script	Won
2019	ASEAN International Film Festival & Awards	Signal Rock	Best Film	Won
2019	ASEAN International Film Festival & Awards	Chito S. Roño	Best Director	Nominated
2019	ASEAN International Film Festival & Awards	Elora Españo	Best Actress	Nominated
2019	ASEAN International Film Festival & Awards	Rody Vera	Best Screenplay	Nominated
2019	3rd GEMS Hiyas ng Sining Awards	Signal Rock	Best Independent Film	Nominated
2019	3rd GEMS Hiyas ng Sining Awards	Chito S. Roño	Best Director (Independent Film)	Nominated
2019	3rd GEMS Hiyas ng Sining Awards	Christian Bables	Best Actor	Nominated
2019	3rd GEMS Hiyas ng Sining Awards	Daria Ramirez	Best Supporting Actress	Nominated
2019	3rd GEMS Hiyas ng Sining Awards	Arnold Reyes	Best Supporting Actor	Nominated
2019	67th FAMAS Awards	Signal Rock	Best Picture	Nominated
2019	67th FAMAS Awards	Christian Bables	Best Actor	Nominated
2019	67th FAMAS Awards	Daria Ramirez	Best Supporting Actress	Nominated
2019	67th FAMAS Awards	Nanding Josef	Best Supporting Actor	Nominated
2019	67th FAMAS Awards	Rody Vera	Best Original Screenplay	Nominated
2019	41st Gawad Urian Awards	Signal Rock	Best Picture	Nominated
2019	41st Gawad Urian Awards	Chito S. Roño	Best Director	Nominated
2019	41st Gawad Urian Awards	Christian Bables	Best Actor	Nominated
2019	41st Gawad Urian Awards	Daria Ramirez	Best Supporting Actress	Nominated
2019	41st Gawad Urian Awards	Rody Vera	Best Screenplay	Won
2019	41st Gawad Urian Awards	Neil Daza	Best Cinematography	Nominated
2019	41st Gawad Urian Awards	Mark Sabas	Best Production Design	Nominated
2019	41st Gawad Urian Awards	Carlo Francisco Manatad	Best Editing	Nominated
2019	41st Gawad Urian Awards	Albert Michael Idioma	Best Sound	Nominated
2019	35th PMPC Star Award for Movies	Signal Rock	Movie of the Year	Nominated
2019	35th PMPC Star Award for Movies	Chito S. Roño	Movie Director of the Year	Nominated
2019	35th PMPC Star Award for Movies	Daria Ramirez	Movie Supporting Actress of the Year	Nominated
2019	35th PMPC Star Award for Movies	Rody Vera	Movie Screenwriter of the Year	Nominated
2019	35th PMPC Star Award for Movies	Neil Daza	Movie Cinematographer of the Year	Nominated
2019	35th PMPC Star Award for Movies	Mark Sabas	Movie Production Designer of the Year	Nominated
2019	35th PMPC Star Award for Movies	Carlo Francisco Manatad	Movie Editor of the Year	Nominated
2019	35th PMPC Star Award for Movies	Albert Michael Idioma	Movie Sound Engineer of the Year	Nominated
2019	35th PMPC Star Award for Movies	Signal Rock	Movie Ensemble Acting of the Year	Nominated
2019	3rd EDDYS (Entertainment Editors’ Choice)	Signal Rock	Best Picture	Nominated
2019	3rd EDDYS (Entertainment Editors’ Choice)	Chito S. Roño	Best Director	Nominated
2019	3rd EDDYS (Entertainment Editors’ Choice)	Christian Bables	Best Actor	Nominated
2019	3rd EDDYS (Entertainment Editors’ Choice)	Daria Ramirez	Best Supporting Actress	Nominated
2019	3rd EDDYS (Entertainment Editors’ Choice)	Rody Vera	Best Screenplay	Nominated
2019	3rd EDDYS (Entertainment Editors’ Choice)	Neil Daza	Best Cinematography	Nominated
2019	3rd EDDYS (Entertainment Editors’ Choice)	Jaypee Estigoy	Best Visual Effects	Nominated
2019	3rd EDDYS (Entertainment Editors’ Choice)	Mark Sabas	Best Production Design	Nominated
2019	3rd EDDYS (Entertainment Editors’ Choice)	Carlo Francisco Manatad	Best Editing	Nominated
2019	3rd EDDYS (Entertainment Editors’ Choice)	Albert Michael Idioma	Best Sound	Nominated
2019	6th UFF Urduja Film Heritage Awards	Signal Rock	Jury Award (Movie of the Year: Drama)	Won
2019	6th UFF Urduja Film Heritage Awards	Christian Bables	Best Actor	Won
2019	6th UFF Urduja Film Heritage Awards	Neil Daza	Best Cinematography	Won
2019	37th FAP Luna Awards	Signal Rock	Best Picture	Nominated
2019	37th FAP Luna Awards	Chito S. Roño	Best Director	Won
2019	37th FAP Luna Awards	Christian Bables	Best Actor	Nominated
2019	37th FAP Luna Awards	Mon Confiado	Best Supporting Actor	Nominated
2019	37th FAP Luna Awards	Daria Ramirez	Best Supporting Actress	Won
2019	37th FAP Luna Awards	Rody Vera	Best Screenplay	Nominated
2019	37th FAP Luna Awards	Neil Daza	Best Cinematography	Nominated
2019	37th FAP Luna Awards	Mark Sabas	Best Production Design	Nominated
2019	37th FAP Luna Awards	Albert Michael Idioma	Best Sound	Nominated

== Ratings ==
According to the Movie and Television Review and Classification Board (MTRCB), due to several foul language, mature theme, and some sex scenes, only audiences eighteen (18) years old and above can view this well crafted film (Director's Cut). The MTRCB classified the film as rated R-18.

== See also ==
- List of submissions to the 91st Academy Awards for Best Foreign Language Film
- List of Philippine submissions for the Academy Award for Best Foreign Language Film
