= Dwein Baltazar =

Filipino filmmaker

- Education: Colegio de San Juan de Letran
- Occupations: Film director and screenwriter
- Years active: 2012–present

Dwein Ruedas Baltazar is a Filipino filmmaker. She is best known for directing the films Gusto Kita with All My Hypothalamus (2018) and Oda sa Wala (2018). She has also directed a number of iWantTFC series, such as Past, Present, Perfect? (2019) and I Am U (2020).

Baltazar began her career in independent cinema but has since directed a number of works for ABS-CBN, such as the series Marry Me, Marry You (2021). Baltazar's works tend to focus on themes of loneliness and fear.

== Early life and education ==
Baltazar received a BA in Communication Arts from the Colegio de San Juan de Letran in Manila, Philippines. She has stated her cinematic influences to include Michel Gondry and François Ozon.

== Career ==
Baltazar started her career in the entertainment industry as a stylist for film and television, which she worked as for three years for filmmakers such as Raya Martin and Chris Martinez. In 2012, she directed her debut feature Mamay Umeng, which won the Best Picture prize at the 2013 Jeonju International Film Festival. Baltazar's sophomore film, Gusto Kita with All My Hypothalamus, released in 2018, also received international plaudits, winning two awards at the Golden Horse Film Festival in Taipei.

In 2019, Baltazar's film Oda sa Wala was screened in competition at the 54th Karlovy Vary International Film Festival. It also won major awards at the 67th Filipino Academy of Movie Arts and Sciences (FAMAS) Awards, winning Best Picture, Best Screenplay, and Best Director.

In 2021, she directed her first commercial work, the film Hello Stranger: The Movie.

== Filmography ==
=== Film ===
Table featuring feature films directed by Martin Scorsese
| Year | Title | Director | Writer | Ref. |
|---|---|---|---|---|
| 2012 | Mamay Umeng | Yes | Yes | |
| 2018 | Gusto Kita with All My Hypothalamus | Yes | Yes | |
| 2018 | Exes Baggage | No | Yes | |
| 2018 | Oda sa Wala | Yes | Yes | |
| 2019 | Open | No | Yes | |
| 2021 | Hello Stranger: The Movie | Yes | No | |
| 2023 | Third World Romance | Yes | Yes | |

=== Television ===
Table featuring feature films directed by Martin Scorsese
| Year | Title | Director | Writer | Notes | Ref. |
|---|---|---|---|---|---|
| 2017 | I Heart Davao | No | Yes | | |
| 2019 | Past, Present, Perfect? | Yes | Yes | | |
| 2019 | Maalaala Mo Kaya | Yes | No | Episode: "Flyers" | |
| 2019 | Uncoupling | Yes | Yes | | |
| 2020 | I Am U | Yes | No | | |
| 2020 | Unconditional | Yes | No | | |
| 2021 | Marry Me, Marry You | Yes | No | | |
| 2022 | Run To Me | Yes | No | | |
| 2025 | How to Spot a Red Flag | Yes | No | | |
| 2026 | Love, Siargao | Yes | No | | |

== Awards ==
Local Awards

- Best Director for Third World Romance at the 47th Gawad Urian Awards.
- Best Director, Best Film and Best Original Screenplay for Gusto Kita with All My Hypothalamus at the 67th FAMAS Awards
- Best Director and Best Film for Oda sa Wala at the 6th QCinema International Film Festival.
- Nominated Best Director and Best Film for Gusto Kita with All My Hypothalamus at the 37th Luna Awards.
- Nominated Best Screenplay for Gusto Kita with All My Hypothalamus at the 42nd Gawad Urian Awards
- Nominated Best Film and Best Screenplay for Oda sa Wala at the 29th Young Critics Circle Award.
- Nominated Best Director, Best Film and Best Screenplay for Gusto Kita with All My Hypothalamus at the 2018 CineCilipino Film Festival.
- Nominated Best Director for Third World Romance at the 4th Pinoy Review Awards.

International Awards

- NETPAC Awardee and Asian Film Observatory Award at the 2018 Golden Horse Film Festival and Awards.
- Nominated for New Talent Award for Gusto Kita with All My Hypothalamus at the 2018 Hong Kong Asian Film Festival (HKAFF).
- Nominated Best Film for Gusto Kita with All My Hypothalamus at the 2019 Osaka Asian Film Festival.
