= Enzo Williams =

Filipino filmmaker

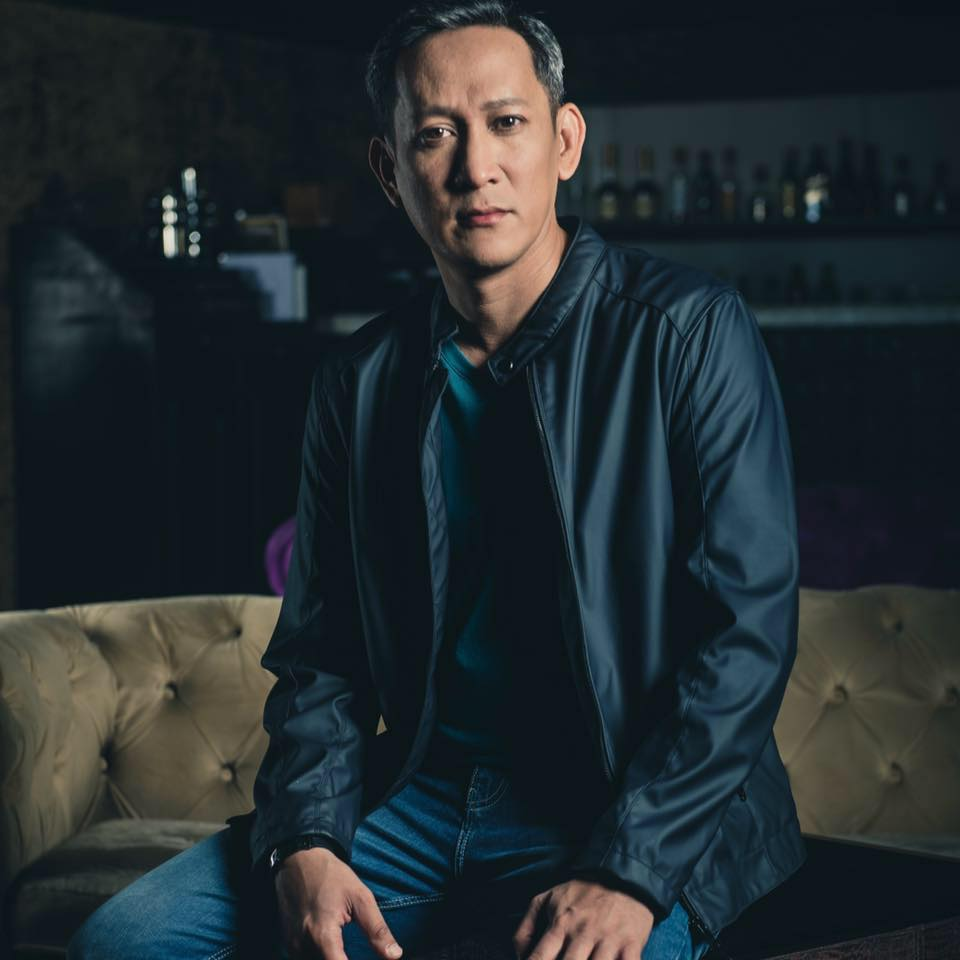
- Born: Manila, Philippines
- Education: Los Angeles City College
- Occupations: Director, filmmaker

Enzo Williams is a Filipino filmmaker.

== Early life ==
Williams was born in Manila, Philippines. He decided at nine to become a filmmaker.

== Career ==
Williams won best film at Los Angeles City College film school in 2012. He returned to Manila in 2014 and directed his first feature film, Bonifacio: Ang Unang Pangulo. It became one of the most awarded films in Filipino cinema. It earned 22 awards, including three for best picture, along with two best director awards: from Star Awards, as well as from the Filipino Academy of Movie Arts and Sciences Awards (FAMAS) - the country's leading award-giving body.

During the 2016 elections, Williams directed the controversial "Last Christmas” ad for Rodrigo Duterte. He directed senatorial ads for Imee Marcos and Migz Zubiri. He directed a worldwide promotional ad for the boxer Manny Pacquiao for one of his championship fights. He then directed blockbuster The Escort. His military action film A.W.O.L. was made in partnership with the Armed Forces of the Philippines.

Williams' first TV series, Ang Probinsyano earned record-breaking television ratings to become both the longest running and most successful primetime series in the country’s history.

The City Government of San Juan - his hometown - honored Williams with the Excellence Award, given for outstanding contribution in a professional field.

He is currently in pre-production on his next film, Enzo, which is about international race car champion Enzo Pastor.

== Filmography ==
=== Film ===
Year	Title	Notes
2014	Bonifacio: Ang Unang Pangulo	
2016	The Escort	
2017	AWOL	
2019	Mga Mata sa Dilim	

=== Television ===
Year	Title	Network
2017–2019	FPJ's Ang Probinsyano	ABS-CBN
2023	Maging Sino Ka Man	GMA Network
2023–2024	Walang Matigas na Pulis sa Matinik na Misis	GMA Network

== Sources ==
- FULL LIST: Nominees, FAMAS Awards 2015
- FULL LIST: Winners, Star Awards for movies 2015
- FULL LIST: Winners, MMFF 2014 awards night
- Teachers Groups Say Bonifacio Movie Real History
