= The Panti Sisters =

- Theatrical film poster
- Directed by: Jun Lana
- Written by: Ivan Andrew Payawal
- Produced by: Carlo L. Katigbak; Olivia M. Lamasan; Joji Alonso
- Starring: Paolo Ballesteros; Martin del Rosario; Christian Bables
- Cinematography: Theo Lozada
- Edited by: Tara Illenberger
- Music by: Emerzon Texon
- Production companies: Black Sheep Productions; ALV Films; The IdeaFirst Company; Quantum Films
- Distributed by: ABS-CBN Films
- Release date: September 13, 2019
- Running time: 108 minutes
- Country: Philippines
- Language: Filipino
- Box office: ₱213 million

The Panti Sisters is a 2019 Filipino comedy film directed by Jun Lana from a story and screenplay written by Ivan Andrew Payawal. Starring Paolo Ballesteros, Martin del Rosario and Christian Bables, the film revolves around the three gay sons challenge each other when their terminally-ill father offers them a share of inheritance if they will produce a grandchild for him before he dies.

Produced by Black Sheep Productions, ALV Films, The IdeaFirst Company, and Quantum Films and distributed by ABS-CBN Films, the film was theatrically released on September 13, 2019, as one of the entries for the Pista ng Pelikulang Pilipino 2019.

== Synopsis ==
A terminally-ill, wealthy father reveals to his homosexual sons of his impending death due to cancer and offers a ₱300 million inheritance to who among them can give him grandchildren.

== Cast ==
=== Main cast ===
- Paolo Ballesteros as Gabriel Panti
- Martin del Rosario as Daniel Panti
- Christian Bables as Samuel Panti

=== Supporting cast ===
- John Arcilla as Don Emilio Montemayor Zobel Ayala y Panti
- Carmi Martin as Nora Panti
- Rosanna Roces as Vilma Panti
- Joross Gamboa as Zernan
- Roxanne Barcelo as Kat
- Cedrick Juan as Estong
- Via Antonio as Chiqui

=== Guest cast ===
- Ali Forbes
- Mark McMahon
- Addy Raj
- Luis Hontiveros

== Release ==
The Panti Sisters had its theatrical release as part of the 2019 Pista ng Pelikulang Pilipino Film festival which ran from September 13 to 19, 2019. However screening of the film ran beyond the duration film festival.

=== Television release ===
==== Pay-per-view ====
The film premiered on Kapamilya Box Office from February 21-25, 2020.

==== Cable television ====
The film premiered on Cinema One on May 16, 2020 and on Kapamilya Channel on August 3, 2020.

==== Free-to-air ====
The film premiered on A2Z on May 13, 2021.

== Accolades ==
Year	Festival/Award Ceremony	Award	Recipient	Result
2020	4th GEMS Hiyas ng Sining Awards	Best Actor	Christian Bables	Nominated
2020	4th GEMS Hiyas ng Sining Awards	Best Supporting Actor	John Arcilla	Nominated
2020	1st Village Pipol Choice Awards	Movie of the Year	The Panti Sisters	Nominated
2020	1st Village Pipol Choice Awards	Film Actor of the Year	Christian Bables	Nominated
2019	3rd Pista ng Pelikulang Pilipino	Audience Choice	The Panti Sisters	Won
2019	3rd Pista ng Pelikulang Pilipino	Best Actor	Martin del Rosario	Won
2019	3rd Pista ng Pelikulang Pilipino	Best Production Design	Maolen Fadul	Won

== Sequel ==
On November 8, 2019, after the film being a success, it was announced that a sequel is now in the works.
