= Pista ng Pelikulang Pilipino =

Film festival held in the Philippines

- Founded: August 2017
- Hosted by: Film Development Council of the Philippines
- No. of films: 2019 (10)
- Language: Various Philippine languages
- Website: pistangpelikulangpilipino.ph

Pista ng Pelikulang Pilipino (lit. 'Festival of Filipino Films'), abbreviated as PPP, is a film festival held in the Philippines in celebration of the Buwan ng Wika. It is organized by the Film Development Council of the Philippines. Similar to the Metro Manila Film Festival, only shortlisted films will be shown in cinemas except in select 3D cinemas, VIP cinemas (in an opt-in/opt-out basis by developer) and IMAX theaters.

The movies are classified into 3 categories. First are the Main Feature Films which are competing for the awards. Second are the "Sine Kabataan Shorts" which are 5-minute short films that are played before the feature film. Third are the Non-Competition entries which are movies that won in other film festivals and as such, are given special limited screening during the PPP festival.

== Festivals ==
Festival	Year	Awards Night	
Festival	Year	Venue	City
1st	2017	Whitespace Manila	Makati
2nd	2018	Whitespace Manila	Makati
3rd	2019	One Esplanade, SM Mall of Asia Complex	Pasay
4th	2020	Virtual event	
5th	2021	Virtual event	
6th	2022		

== Select editions ==
=== 2021 edition ===
For the 2021 edition, the Pista ng Pelikulang Pilipino shifted from showcasing feature-length film to showcasing solely short films on the FDCP website.

=== 2022 edition ===
The PPP returned to live screening for the 2022 edition. Feature films associated with actress Nora Aunor, screenwriter Ricky Lee, and director Marilou Diaz-Abaya as well as other restored films were among the works showcased.

== Proposed 2024 edition ==
In January 2024, the Metropolitan Manila Development Authority offered a proposal to the FDCP to help them organize a 2024 edition of the PPP, since they do not plan to hold the Summer Metro Manila Film Festival in that year. The organization of the PPP is not part of FDCP's budget for 2024, and they released a statement that an extensive study is needed to be made in regards to the proposal.

== Winners ==
=== Feature films ===
==== Major awards ====
Year	Best Film	Best Direction	Best Actress	Best Actor	Best Supporting Actress	Best Supporting Actor
2017	No award because this edition of the festival was not competitive.					
2018	No award because this edition of the festival was not competitive.					
2019	Lola Igna	Tyrone Acierto (Watch Me Kill)	Angie Ferro (Lola Igna)	Martin del Rosario (The Panti Sisters)	Tuesday Vargas (LSS)	Gio Alvarez (I'm Ellenya L)
2020	Cleaners	Glenn Barit (Cleaners)	Hana Kino (Come On, Irene)	Gold Azeron (Metamorphosis)	Gianne Rivera (Cleaners)	Henyo Ehem (The Highest Peak)

==== Production awards ====
Year	Best Editing	Best Screenplay	Best Cinematography	Best Production Design	Best Musical Score	Best Theme Song	Best Sound Design
2017	No award because this edition of the festival was not competitive.						
2018	No award because this edition of the festival was not competitive.						
2019	Colorado Rutledge (Watch Me Kill)	Eduardo Roy Jr. & Margarette Labrador (Lola Igna)	Marcin Szocinski (Watch Me Kill)	Marxie Maolen Fadul (The Panti Sisters)	Andrew Florentino (Lola Igna)	"Araw-Araw" by Ben&Ben (LSS)	Aurel Claro Bilbao & Arnel Labayo (LSS)
2020	Lawrence Fajardo (Kintsugi)	Jason Paul Laxamana (He Who is Without Sin)	Emmanuel Liwanag (He Who is Without Sin)	Alvin Francisco (Cleaners)	Glenn Barit (Cleaners)	—N/a	Arbi Barbarona (The Highest Peak)

==== Special awards ====
Year	Special Jury Prize	Critics' Choice	Audience Choice	Others
2017	Patay na si Hesus	Birdshot	100 Tula Para kay Stella	—N/a
2018	Signal Rock	Signal Rock	Bakwit Boys; The Day After Valentine's; Kiko Boksingero	—N/a
2019	LSS	—N/a	The Panti Sisters	PistApp Audience Choice: LSS
2020	Metamorphosis	—N/a	He Who is Without Sin	—N/a

=== Sine Kabataan Shorts ===
The Sine Kabataan Short Film Competition gives a platform to all aspiring young filmmakers. It is open to all filmmakers of ages 15 to 30 years old. This serves to encourage the youth to develop their creativity and originality in storytelling, touching on important issues of today as perceived by the youth. The 5-minute Sine Kabataan Short Films are paired with PPP full feature counterparts and are screened in all cinemas nationwide.

Year	Best Short Film	Special Jury Prize	Audience Choice	Best Director	Others
2017	Ang Unang Araw ng Pasukan	Pahimakas; Delayed si Jhemerlyn Rose	—N/a	—N/a	Amazing By Choice Award: Fat You; Ang Kapitbahay ko sa 2014
2018	Bato Bato Pik	Koleksyong Pamalo	Alas Nuebe ng Tanghali	Daniel Delgado and Tiara Angelica Nicolas (Masaya Ako)	#GlobeOfGood Award: Runner
2019	Kalakalaro	Magna	Chok	Rodson Ver Suarez (Kalakalaro)	—N/a

== Box office ==
Year	Run days	Entries	Gross
2017	7	12	₱149.5 million
2018	7	8	₱122 million
2019	7	10	₱154.7 million

== See also ==
- Cinemalaya Film Festival
- Metro Manila Film Festival
- QCinema International Film Festival
- Cinema One Originals Film Festival
- Cinema of the Philippines
