= Film Development Council of the Philippines =

Philippine film industry agency

- Sanggunian ng Pilipinas sa Pagpapaunlad ng Pelikula
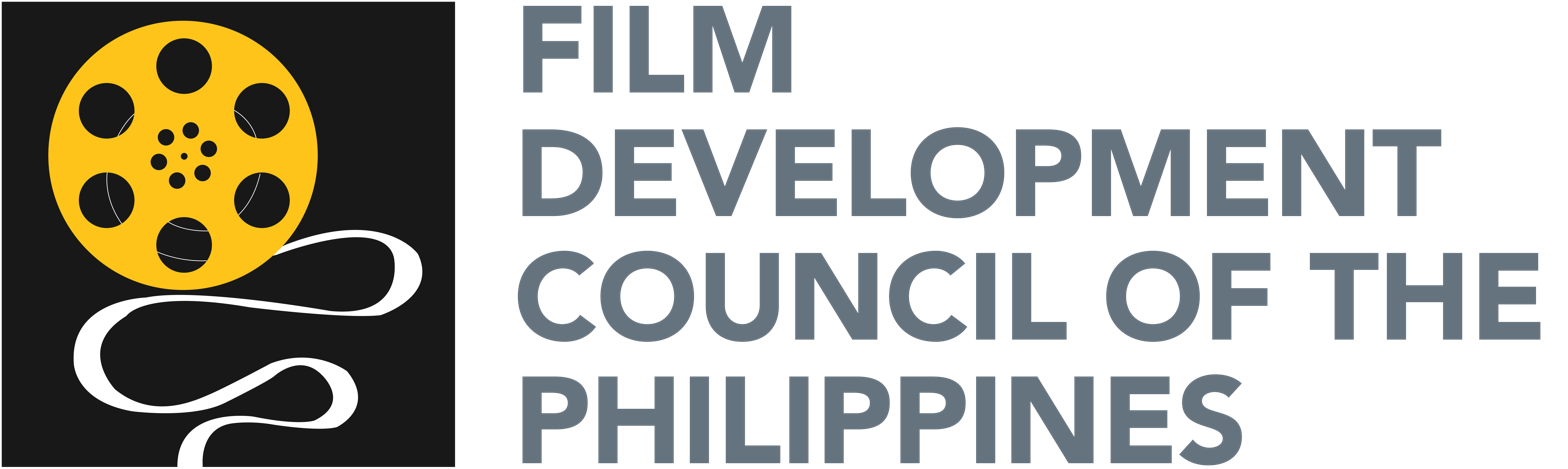
- Logo

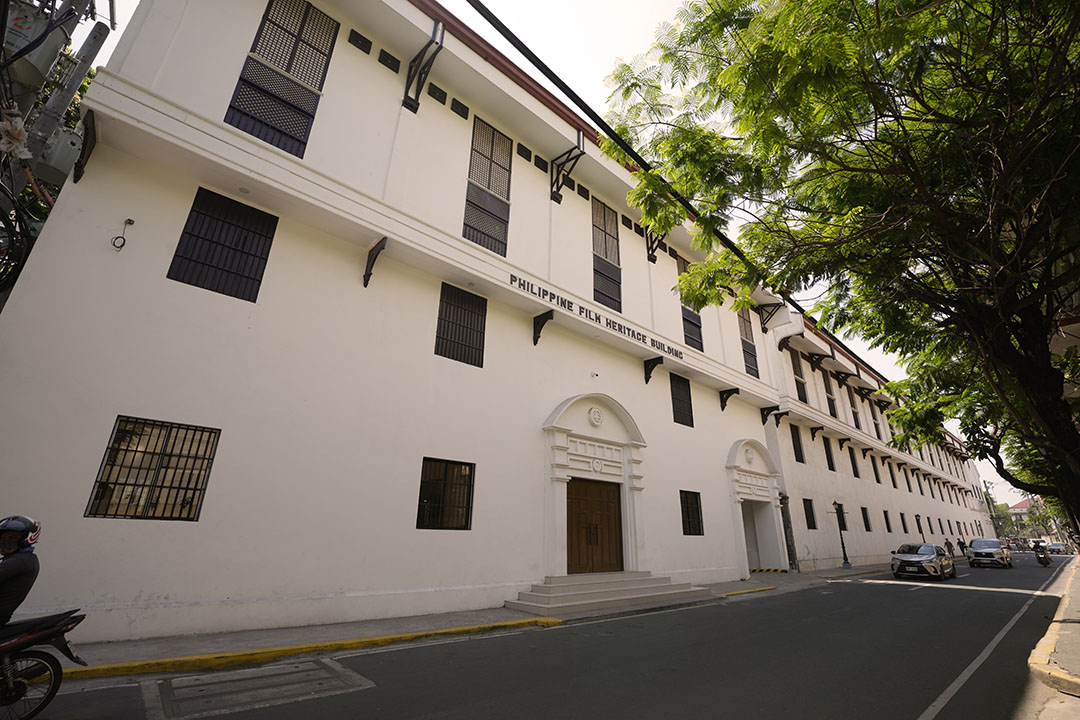
- FDCP office in Intramuros, Manila

Agency overview
- Formed: June 7, 2002
- Jurisdiction: Philippines
- Headquarters: Philippine Film Heritage Building, Sta. Lucia Street (Beside Baluarte de San Diego), Intramuros, Manila, Philippines
- Employees: 120+ (2026)
- Annual budget: PHP 367,349 million (2026)
- Agency executive: Jose Javier Reyes, Chairperson and CEO
- Parent Agency: Office of the President of the Philippines
- Website: www.fdcp.ph

The Film Development Council of the Philippines (FDCP; Filipino: Sanggunian ng Pilipinas sa Pagpapaunlad ng Pelikula) is the national film agency under the Office of the President of the Philippines responsible for film policies and programs to ensure the economic, cultural and educational development of the Philippine film industry. It aims to encourage the production of quality films and to conduct film-related events that enhance the skills of the Filipino talents. The agency also leads the film industry's participation in domestic and foreign film markets, and local and international film festivals, and is tasked to preserve and protect films as part of the country's national cultural heritage.

== History ==
=== 1982–1985: Experimental Cinema of the Philippines ===
Experimental Cinema of the Philippines (ECP) was established by Executive Order No. 770 signed on January 29, 1982, by President Ferdinand E. Marcos, ECP created to promote the growth and development of the local film industry. ECP created after the first Manila International Film Festival, the ECP was primarily known as a production company. However, it was created among other things; to hold the Manila International Film Festival, to manage the Manila Film Center, administer a film rating and classification system and to establish and operate the National Film Archive. It was also mandated to provide financial assistance to select motion pictures through a film fund.

=== 1985–2002: Film Development Foundation of the Philippines, Inc. ===
The FDFPI was established by Executive Order No. 1051 signed on August 8, 1985, by President Ferdinand E. Marcos, which became functional on October 2, 1985, after it was registered with the Securities and Exchange Commission. The same Executive Order ended the Experimental Cinema of the Philippines [ECP]. The Film Ratings Board was established in 1982 by virtue of Executive Order No. 811 signed by President Ferdinand E. Marcos. From 1982 to 1984, it functioned as one of the five modules under the ECP together with the Film Fund, Alternative Cinema, Film Archives, and Manila International Film Festival [MIFF]. It ceased to operate in 1985 when the ECP was abolished. In 1994, a directive from President Fidel V. Ramos revived the FRB, which was placed under the newly-activated FDFPI. The FRB was re-established by President Ramos to encourage the local film industry to make better and higher quality films through amusement tax rebates.

=== 2002–present: Film Development Council of the Philippines ===
The FDCP was created by Republic Act 9167, "An Act Creating the Film Development Council of the Philippines, Defining its Powers and Functions, Appropriating Funds Therefore, and for Other Purposes", which was approved by the 12th Congress on June 7, 2002. The FDCP is under the Office of the President of the Philippines. The creation of the FDCP is pursuant to the constitutional guarantee on freedom of expression by which the State, as a policy, recognizes the need to promote and support the development and growth of the local film industry as a medium for the upliftment of aesthetic, cultural and social values for the better understanding and appreciation of the Filipino identity. Republic Act 9167 abolished the Film Development Foundation of the Philippines, Inc. [FDFPI] and the Film Ratings Board [FRB] and transferred all their books, assets, rights, privileges, records, obligations and liabilities to the FDCP.

In 2020, the FDCP launched its streaming platform called the FDCP Channel initially to host the online edition of its film festival Pista ng Pelikulang Pilipino; by November 11, 2022, the platform was relaunched as JuanFlix to cater to cinephiles with its content being short films and local and foreign full-length features.

== Programs ==
=== Philippine Film Export Services Office ===
The Philippine Film Export Service Office (PFESO) was created with decidedly global perspective and objective: to promote the country as a viable and effective location site and post-production service provider in the region. PFESO was created via Executive Order 674 s. 2007, and its primary mandate is to facilitate the promotion of the Philippines as a viable filming location for foreign film and television content production, and for the following objectives:

- To streamline and expedite processing of requirements for foreign filmmakers seeking to film in the Philippines.
- To strengthen linkages and collaboration among foreign film producers and film bodies with Philippines’ homegrown pool of film workers and film production teams.
- To carry out the government's policy of maximizing the country's potential as a location site for international film and television content production.

=== Film distribution and exhibition ===
In 2014, the FDCP helped fund the production of the anthology film Tres.

Beginning 2021, The FDCP had started to acquire Philippine release rights to a handful of foreign-language films such as Portrait of a Lady on Fire and The Worst Person in the World. Under the Film Cultural Exchange Program (FCEP), the films are rated through the FDCP rating system pursuant to the agreed-upon guidelines by the FDCP and the MTRCB.

As of 2023, the FDCP had acquired the following films for distribution:

=== 2023 ===
- Aftersun (United Kingdom, United States; 2022)
- Close (Belgium, Netherlands, France; 2022)
- Return to Seoul (Cambodia; 2022)
- Corsage (Austria, France, Germany, Luxembourg; 2022)

=== 2024 ===
- Anatomy of a Fall (France, 2023)
- How to Have Sex (United Kingdom, 2023)
- Only the River Flows (China, 2023)

=== 2025 ===
- A Traveler's Needs (South Korea, 2024)
- Bird (United Kingdom, France, Germany; 2024)
- Black Dog (China, 2024)
- Dahomey (France, Senegal; 2024)
- Flow (Latvia, France, Belgium; 2024)
- I'm Still Here (Brazil, France; 2024)
- Memoir of a Snail (Australia; 2024)
- The Seed of the Sacred Fig (Germany, Iran, France; 2024)
- Young Hearts (Belgium, Netherlands; 2024)

=== 2026 ===
- Case 137 (France; 2025)
- It Was Just an Accident (France, Iran; 2025)
- Resurrection (China, France; 2025)
- The Secret Agent (Brazil, France; 2025)
- Sentimental Value (Norway, France, United Kingdom; 2025)
- Sound of Falling (Germany; 2025)

=== Upcoming ===
- La bola negra (Spain, France)
- All of a Sudden (Japan, France)
- Elephants in the Fog (Nepal)

==== Pista ng Pelikulang Pilipino ====
The Pista ng Pelikulang Pilipino is a one-week exclusive screening of Filipino films in all theaters nationwide. It was launched in August 2017 by the Film Development Council of the Philippines in partnership with theaters nationwide.

==== CineLokal ====
CineLokal is an alternative and accessible venue for exhibiting Filipino and world cinema. Started last April 19, 2017, eight theaters was dedicated by SM Cinemas in the Philippines to screening two films selected by the FDCP. The selection ranges from award-winning Filipino movies, independently produced movies, regional films, classic films from great Filipino directors, and limited release foreign films.
