= Abaddon in popular culture =

Abaddon, a name given to an angel, a demon or a place of destruction, has appeared many times in works of literature, films, television and popular culture.

In Hebrew the term Abaddon (Hebrew: אֲבַדּוֹן Avaddon), means "doom"; the Greek equivalent is Apollyon. In the Christian Bible it is both a place of destruction and an angel of the abyss. In the Hebrew Bible (Tanakh), abaddon is a bottomless pit, and often appears alongside the place שְׁאוֹל (Sheol), meaning the realm of the dead.

== Literature ==
- In The Pilgrim's Progress, Abaddon (as Apollyon) appears as the "foul fiend" who assaults Christian on his pilgrimage through the Valley of Humiliation. He rules over the city of Destruction, and attacks Christian when he refuses to return.
  - Louisa May Alcott references The Pilgrim's Progress in her novel Little Women, wherein Apollyon is used as a metaphor to represent Jo March's temper.
- In The Making of the English Working Class, E.P. Thompson entitled the second chapter of Part I "Christian and Apollyon."
- John Milton uses Abaddon as the name of the bottomless pit in Paradise Regained (IV, 264).
- In Friedrich Gottlieb Klopstock's epic poem Der Messias (The Messiah), Abbadona is an angel drawn into Satan's rebellion who reproves Satan for his pride.
- Abaddon is mentioned by his Greek name, Apollyon, in Robert Browning's "Childe Roland to the Dark Tower Came".
- Abaddon appears as Abadonna (Russian: Абадонна), the angel of death in Mikhail Bulgakov's The Master and Margarita.
- Abaddón el Exterminador is the title of Argentine writer Ernesto Sabato's third and last novel, published in 1974. It was translated as The Angel of Darkness in English.
- The name of Azkaban, a prison for wizards in Harry Potter, is derived from Abaddon and the real-life prison Alkatraz.
- The fallen angel/demon Apollyon is the main antagonist of the Brazilian novel "A Batalha do Apocalipse" by Eduardo Spohr.
- Abaddon's Gate is the title of the third novel of The Expanse series, a space opera by James S. A. Corey.
- In Dan Brown's 2009 novel The Lost Symbol, the main antagonist, Zachary Solomon, believing himself to be the incarnation of the angel Malak, calls himself Dr Christopher Abaddon.
- Abaddon, the Angel of the Abyss, is a nickname for Marc Remillard in Julian May's Saga of Pliocene Exile and Galactic Milieu Series.
- Abaddon appears in Melissa de la Cruz's book series Blue Bloods as a blue blood named Benjamin 'Jack' Force.
- Abaddon is a creature/character in Patrick Carman's The Land of Elyon series.
- The third novel of Elizabeth Donald's Nocturnal Urges vampire series is titled Abaddon. In the novel, a vampire cult in Memphis, Tennessee has adopted the name both for their group and the underground fortress in which they live.
- In City of Bones (part of The Mortal Instruments trilogy) by Cassandra Clare, Abaddon is a higher Demon who is summoned by a warlock for Valentine Morgenstern to employ in his war against the Clave.
- Apollyon is the title of the fifth book in the Left Behind series by authors Tim LaHaye and Jerry B. Jenkins and focuses on the attack of the demon locusts described in the Revelation of St. John.
- In Terry Brooks's Magic Kingdom of Landover, Abaddon is a netherworld that lies beneath Landover.
- In Wayne Barlowe's God's Demon, "Abaddon's Pit" is a deep pit in Hell where the demon Abaddon resides. It is considered an eternal punishment of darkness and torment for demons who disobey the ruler of Hell, Beelzebub.
- The antagonists call upon a stealth bomber code-named Abaddon in Andy McDermott's book The Covenant of Genesis.
- In Scott Pinsker's novel The Second Coming: A Love Story, Abaddon is the leader of the rebellion against God. Abaddon later appears as a giant, scarred fish swimming in Hell's waters.
- In book five of James Patterson's Daniel X series, Abaddon is portrayed as the second most wanted alien on Earth, who is the same species as the protagonist.
- Volume 10 of the High School DxD light novels by Ichiei Ishibumi has a character named Kuisha Abaddon who serves as the Queen of Sairaorg Bael. She uses a technique described as 'Hole', which creates a void in space that can suck in anything.
- Blameless in Abaddon (1996) is the second book of James Morrow's "Godhead" trilogy.
- Apollyon is an esoteric object class in the SCP Foundation universe and mythos that denotes an SCP that will or is causing the end of the world or a "XK-class scenario."
- Dawn Powell's 1948 novel The Locusts Have No King is a social satire centered around New York's literary elite and their desperate, debauched hangers-on. The title alludes to the biblical Locust King, Abaddon.
- A demonic character named Abaddon appears in Brent Weeks's Lightbringer Series, first appearing in book three, The Broken Eye, then recurring in the fifth and final book, The Burning White.

=== Comics ===
- In issue 117 of Whiz Comics, Abaddon is revealed to have written a book of magic which a student uses to summon him. He is defeated by Ibis the Invincible and Taia, and falls to Hades by his own spell with the student and book.
- In issue 32.5 (Feb 2012) of The Unwritten by Mike Carey and Peter Gross, Abaddon is a snake-like monster that feeds on stories, eventually confronted by Gilgamesh and thus inspiring the writing of the Epic of Gilgamesh. The comic also links Abaddon with Thomas Hobbes' Leviathan.
- The Abaddon is a serialized webcomic by Koren Shadmi, loosely based on Jean-Paul Sartre's No Exit.
- In the oneshot Zone, by Hoshino Katsura, a Dagger named Abadon appears, perhaps there is a connection, as the dagger is a powerful Destroyer of demons called akuma, which appear in the oneshot and its successor D.Gray-Man.
- The Monad - the distillation of human evil from the end of time - disguises itself as Abaddon, an alien bounty hunter, which hunted the ABC Warriors.

=== Occult literature ===
- In occultism and esoterism, Abaddon's Tarot symbol is Judgement.
- In Francis Barrett's The Magus, Abaddon is pictured as one of the evil demons.
- In LaVeyan Satanism, Abaddon is the first of the infernal names, as it comes first alphabetically, meaning "The Destroyer".
- In the Key of Solomon, Abaddon is listed as the name of God used by Moses to flood Egypt.
- In Sepharial's Manual of Occultism, Abaddon is in charge of the Furies, the seventh order of nine orders of demons.

== Music ==
- Abaddon (as Apollyon) appears in Act 2 of the opera The Pilgrim's Progress by Ralph Vaughan Williams.
- Trilogy, the third studio album of the progressive rock band Emerson, Lake & Palmer, ends with an eight-minute instrumental titled "Abaddon's Bolero".
- Former drummer Anthony Bray of the English heavy metal band Venom used Abaddon as his stage name
- There is an Irish death metal/black metal/grindcore band called "Abaddon Incarnate".
- Indie rock band Pinback's 2004 album is titled Summer in Abaddon.
- American deathcore band With Blood Comes Cleansing's album Horror has a track called "Abaddon's Horde".
- American metal band Saviours titled their 2008 album Into Abaddon which features a track of the same name.
- The album Sunrise Over a Sea of Blood by American metal band Mortal Treason features a song titled "Abaddon".
- Polish heavy/thrash metal band KAT mentions Abaddon in their song "The Time of Revenge".
- Spanish Power metal band Phoenix Rising have a track titled "Abaddon" on their album MMXII.
- Abaddon is the name of a Polish hardcore punk band.
- Czech black-metal band Root have a track titled "Abaddon" on their second studio album, Hell Symphony.
- The rapper Boondox released a song on Halloween 2011 entitled "Abadon", the inspiration of which derives from Abaddon.
- "Lords of Abaddon" is the first track on the 2011 album The Taking (album) by American rock band Loaded.
- American heavy metal band Manowar mentions Abaddon in their song "Dark Avenger" in the portion of the track narrated by Orson Welles.
- The rapper Boondox released an album on 13 May 2014 entitled Abaddon.
- The band Blind Guardian references Abaddon in their song "The Ninth Wave" from their album Beyond the Red Mirror.
- Welsh dark ambient composer Brian Lustmord has a track titled Abaddon on his album The Word As Power
- Crywolf, on his album Exuvium has the second song titled ABBADON along with many other references to Abaddon within the album.

== Film ==
- Abaddon appears as the primary antagonist in the horror film The Heretics.
- Had Abaddon was the original name for the planet Coruscant in the first draft of Return of the Jedi (1983). The lower levels of the planet served as the lair of the Emperor in which Luke Skywalker would fight Darth Vader.
- Abaddon (as Apollyon) appears as one of the demons in the 2019 Philippine horror film Clarita, inspired by the story of Clarita Villanueva.
- One of the 17 titans is named after Abaddon appears on a monitor in Godzilla: King of the Monsters in the film it is awoken by King Ghidorah alongside the other titans. Later shown in the MonsterVerse video game Kong: Survivor Instinct, it is depicted as a giant spider with a skull shaped abdomen believed to be the mother of all spiders.
- The town of Abaddon and the Abaddon Hotel are the settings for Hell House LLC and its sequel.
- Abaddon appears in the tattooed finger of BJ, the main villain in Contracted: Phase II. It appears also in the mid-credits scene in the finger of the doctor assisting BJ while telling him, "Very soon, my friend, very soon".

== Television ==
- In the Mr. Belvedere episode "Halloween" (season 3, episode 5, 1986), The Happy Guys of Pittsburgh organization offers membership to George, which features an oath and induction ceremony specifically noting Abaddon.
- In the Star Trek: Voyager episode "Alice" (season 6, episode 5, 1999), Abaddon is the proprietor of "Abaddon's Repository of Lost Treasures". He sells Voyager a small spaceship that takes over the minds of its owners through its unique neural interface.
- An Outer Limits episode (season 6, episode 123, 2000) is named after Abaddon.
- In the season three premiere episode ("Aquamom", 2006) of Entourage, James Woods claims to have played the character Abaddon in the fictional movie Aquaman starring Vincent Chase.
- In the BBC series Torchwood, Abaddon appears in the episode "End of Days" (2007) as the son of the Beast, an alien being from "the void".
- Matthew Abaddon is a mysterious character in the television series Lost who works for Charles Widmore, appearing in seasons 4 (2008) and 5 (2009).
- Vesper Abaddon is the former King of Carmel, a nation preceding Gilboa, the setting of the NBC TV show Kings (2009). The prison he is kept in is called Gehenna.
- In The CW series The Secret Circle (2011-2012), the witches get possessed by a demon named Abaddon.
- In the HBO series Enlightened (2011-2013), Abaddon is the name of the "unenlightened" company where the main protagonist, Amy Jellicoe, works.
- In a season 8 episode of the TV show Supernatural, "As Time Goes By", the Winchester brothers' grandfather travels forward in time to receive aid against a demon named Abaddon. Abaddon is depicted as a Knight of Hell; one of the first demons to fall with Lucifer and as such is very powerful. She later returns for "Clip Show" and "Sacrifice." She reappears in season 9 (2013-2014) as one of the main antagonists before being killed by Dean Winchester in "King of the Damned."
  - Prior to Abaddon appearing in the show, the character featured in the spin-off novel Supernatural: War of the Sons by Rebecca Dessertine and David Reed, where Abaddon was presented as a fallen angel who called himself Don, set during the show's fifth season, attempting to convince the Winchesters to accept their destined role in the Apocalypse by sending them into the past to find the 'War Scroll', a scroll that allegedly contained the key to stopping the Apocalypse but only listed the bloodlines of families who can act as the vessel for angels.
- In "The Impossible Planet", Episode 8 of Season 2 of the BBC series Doctor Who (aired June 3, 2006), the beast in the pit tells the Doctor and the crew of the space station that "some have called me Abaddon."
- In the TV show Haunted Hotel, Abaddon is a main character, and a demon trapped in the body of a little boy from the 1700s. He hopes to bring chaos on earth, however, he is also resigned to his fate and has integrated into the Freeling family with more success than the ghosts, referring to Ben as his brother.

== Video games ==
- Abaddon is the player character in the cancelled game The Four Horsemen of the Apocalypse. Lance Henriksen provided voice for the character.
- A character called Abaddon, the Lord of Avernus, appears in both Defense of the Ancients and its sequel, Dota 2.
- In The Binding of Isaac: Rebirth, Abaddon is an item that can be obtained by making a deal with the Devil.
  - The "Afterbirth+" expansion of the same game introduces a playable character named Apollyon.
- Abaddon appears in Games Workshop's Warhammer 40,000 fictional universe as Abaddon the Despoiler. He was the 2nd in command of Horus, who was corrupted by Chaos, and thus rebelled against the Imperium of Man in a bloody civil war, and since the death of Horus, has assumed command of the forces of Chaos that broke from Earth. He serves as the primary Villain of Warhammer 40,000.
  - The Australian arachnid Abaddon despoliator is also named after this character
- Abaddon, the God of Secrets and the preceding God of Water, is the main antagonist of the Guild Wars campaign, "Nightfall".
- In the 2003 SCE Studio Cambridge action video game Primal, the main antagonist is the God of Chaos Abaddon.
- Abaddon is a recurring demon of the Megami Tensei franchise. His appearance can be either a giant green slime with a giant mouth, or a bald winged head emerging from the ground.
  - In Shin Megami Tensei II, Abaddon is summoned by the Center to devour the district of Valhalla.
  - Abaddon is central to the investigation in Devil Summoner 2: Raidou Kazunoha vs. King Abaddon. His minions are the Appolyons.
- Abaddon appears in the real-time strategy game Warrior Kings as a godlike unit.
- Abaddon appears as a major character in Darksiders, serving as the main antagonist in the first game. Troy Baker voices the character.
- Abaddon is the name of an international Ingress anomaly series starting in October 2015.
- Abaddon, listed as Apollyon, is a Warlord in the Story Mode of For Honor.
