= KMJS' Gabi ng Lagim =

Philippine television annual special

- Genre: Horror; Anthology
- Presented by: Jessica Soho
- Country of origin: Philippines
- Original language: Filipino

Production
- Camera setup: Multiple-camera setup
- Running time: 60–90 minutes
- Production company: GMA Public Affairs

Original release
- Network: GMA Network
- Release: October 27, 2013 – present

Related
- Kapuso Mo, Jessica Soho

KMJS' Gabi ng Lagim (transl. Night of Terror) is an annual Halloween television special of GMA Network's news magazine show Kapuso Mo, Jessica Soho, featuring urban legends and supernatural stories from around the Philippines. It first aired on October 27, 2013, and has since been presented annually, usually on the Sunday closest to Halloween and All Saints' Day, also known in the Philippines as Undás.

== Overview ==
Kapuso Mo, Jessica Soho previously aired Halloween specials under different titles before GMA Public Affairs Assistant Vice President Lee Joseph Castel suggested in 2012 to create an annual special under one name. It later became the Gabi ng Lagim.

On each edition, the special features three to four real-life accounts with interviews with the actual people, actual photos, videos, and audio recordings of the supernatural encounters, which made it one of the talked about shows in the Philippines during Halloween season online. Rolling Stone Philippines opined that its grounding in real-life accounts makes the special highly anticipated among Filipino television viewers. In 2018, it was reported that the show generated 80,000 tweets in three hours.

In 2026, a segment of the special was criticized for its coverage of alleged hauntings on a Lily bandmember rooted to a supposedly possessed wooden sculpture made by a craftsman from Paete, Laguna. The municipal council alleged that the segment could affect the town's woodcarving industry, threatening the production team and GMA Network with persona non grata. The production subsequently issued an apology, clarifying that it had no intention of damaging public trust in the craft.

== Editions ==
Edition	Year	Title	Stories	Director	Date aired	NUTAM PPL. Rating
1st	2013	Gabi ng Lagim I	Kulam	Topel Lee	October 27, 2013	
1st	2013	Gabi ng Lagim I	Ang Mansyon	Rahyan Carlos	October 27, 2013	
1st	2013	Gabi ng Lagim I	Horror Van	Rember Gelera	October 27, 2013	
2nd	2014	Gabi ng Lagim II	Iskulmeyt	Aloy Adlawan	November 2, 2014	
2nd	2014	Gabi ng Lagim II	Balete	Rember Gelera	November 2, 2014	
2nd	2014	Gabi ng Lagim II	Delubyo	Topel Lee	November 2, 2014	
3rd	2015	Gabi ng Lagim III	Kalaro	Kenneth Dagatan	November 1, 2015	
3rd	2015	Gabi ng Lagim III	Parola	Rember Gelera	November 1, 2015	
3rd	2015	Gabi ng Lagim III	Aparador	Topel Lee	November 1, 2015	
4th	2016	Gabi ng Lagim IV	Sanib	Derick Cabrido	October 30, 2016	
4th	2016	Gabi ng Lagim IV	Paupahan	Topel Lee	October 30, 2016	
4th	2016	Gabi ng Lagim IV	Diplomat Hotel	Rember Gelera	October 30, 2016	
5th	2017	Gabi ng Lagim V	Bisita	Rember Gelera	October 29, 2017	
5th	2017	Gabi ng Lagim V	Maria Labo	Adolf Alix Jr.	October 29, 2017	
5th	2017	Gabi ng Lagim V	Junjun	Derick Cabrido	October 29, 2017	
6th	2018	Gabi ng Lagim VI	Third Eye	Zig Madamba Dulay	October 28, 2018	14.4
6th	2018	Gabi ng Lagim VI	Haunted Hospital	Aaron Papin Mendoza	October 28, 2018	14.4
6th	2018	Gabi ng Lagim VI	Manila City Hall	Rember Gelera	October 28, 2018	14.4
6th	2018	Gabi ng Lagim VI	Amaranhig	Adolf Alix Jr.	October 28, 2018	14.4
7th	2019	Gabi ng Lagim VII	Flying Ataul	Adolfo Alix Jr.	October 27, 2019	16.8
7th	2019	Gabi ng Lagim VII	Museo	Rember Gelera	October 27, 2019	16.8
7th	2019	Gabi ng Lagim VII	Koleksyon	Kenneth Lim Dagatan	October 27, 2019	16.8
7th	2019	Gabi ng Lagim VII	Sundo	Joseph Israel Laban	October 27, 2019	16.8
8th	2020	Gabi ng Lagim VIII	Pinoy Exorcists	Topel Lee	November 1, 2020	20.5
8th	2020	Gabi ng Lagim VIII	Bita: Haunted Manyika	Natanya Nono	November 1, 2020	20.5
8th	2020	Gabi ng Lagim VIII	Karo de Kabayo	Adolf Alix Jr.	November 1, 2020	20.5
8th	2020	Gabi ng Lagim VIII	Ghost Bride sa Paco Cemetery	Aaron Papin Mendoza	November 1, 2020	20.5
9th	2021	Gabi ng Lagim IX	Ngisngis	Adolf Alix Jr.	October 31, 2021	
9th	2021	Gabi ng Lagim IX	Quarantine Hotel	Kenneth Dagatan	October 31, 2021	
9th	2021	Gabi ng Lagim IX	Bata sa Salamin	Rember Gelera	October 31, 2021	
9th	2021	Gabi ng Lagim IX	Mga Liham at Lihim ng Manila Post Office	Topel Lee	October 31, 2021	
10th	2022	Gabi ng Lagim X	Auditorium	Topel Lee	October 30, 2022	
10th	2022	Gabi ng Lagim X	Tiyanak	Adolf Alix Jr.	October 30, 2022	
10th	2022	Gabi ng Lagim X	Pinoy Shutter	Derick Cabrido	October 30, 2022	
10th	2022	Gabi ng Lagim X	Unit 771	Jerrold Tarog	October 30, 2022	
11th	2023	Gabi ng Lagim XI	Ang Pagbabalik sa Diplomat Hotel	Aaron Papin Mendoza	October 29, 2023	
11th	2023	Gabi ng Lagim XI	Haunted Manyika	Adolf Alix Jr.	October 29, 2023	
11th	2023	Gabi ng Lagim XI	Hiwaga sa Loakan Road	May Delos Santos	October 29, 2023	
11th	2023	Gabi ng Lagim XI	Levitation	Michael Christian Cardoz	October 29, 2023	
12th	2024	Gabi ng Lagim XII	Misteryo sa Impounding Area	Michael Christian Cardoz	October 27, 2024	15.9
12th	2024	Gabi ng Lagim XII	Pamilya, Nademonyo?	Aaron Papins Mendoza	October 27, 2024	15.9
12th	2024	Gabi ng Lagim XII	Haunted House for Sale	Adolfo Alix Jr.	October 27, 2024	15.9
12th	2024	Gabi ng Lagim XII	Antique Store	Kiko Meily	October 27, 2024	15.9
13th	2025	Gabi ng Lagim XIII (Note: Advertised as "KMJS: Multo" (transl. Ghost) to give way for the KMJS Gabi ng Lagim: The Movie set to be released that year.)	Manila Film Center	Adolfo Alix Jr.	October 26, 2025	15.1
13th	2025	Gabi ng Lagim XIII	Sumpa ng Manika	Zed Aguilar	October 26, 2025	15.1
13th	2025	Gabi ng Lagim XIII	Lipa Massacre House	Aaron Papins Mendoza	October 26, 2025	15.1
13th	2025	Gabi ng Lagim XIII	Pinoy Demon Hunters	Michael Christian Cardoz and Natanya Nono	October 26, 2025	15.1
14th	2026	Gabi ng Lagim XIV	Baguio Teachers Camp	Aaron Papins Mendoza	November 1, 2026	10.5
14th	2026	Gabi ng Lagim XIV	The Mysterious Case of Julie Vega	Kenneth Dagatan	November 1, 2026	10.5
14th	2026	Gabi ng Lagim XIV	Ukit	Michelle Pe Symaco	November 1, 2026	10.5
14th	2026	Gabi ng Lagim XIV	Dasal Laban sa Dilim	Adolfo Alix Jr.	November 1, 2026	10.5

== Adaptations ==
Some stories featured on Gabi ng Lagim were made into full-feature films, including Sanib by Derick Cabrido from Gabi ng Lagim IV which was made into the film Clarita, and Junjun also by Cabrido from Gabi ng Lagim V, which was made into the film Sunod by Carlo Ledesma. Both films were released in 2019.

In celebration of Kapuso Mo, Jessica Soho's 20th anniversary, a film entitled KMJS' Gabi ng Lagim: The Movie was announced by Soho on February 4, 2024. Produced by GMA Public Affairs and GMA Pictures and distributed by Sony Pictures Releasing International, it was released in Philippine cinemas on November 26, 2025.

On September 5, 2024, GMA Pictures signed a distribution deal with American film company Columbia Pictures (through Sony Pictures Releasing International label) to distribute the film.
