= 34th Gawad Urian Awards =

2011 Philippine film awards ceremony

- Date: May 17, 2011
- Site: Marriott Hotel, Pasay City
- Hosted by: Cesar Montano, Ai-Ai delas Alas & Butch Francisco

Highlights
- Best Picture: Ang Damgo ni Eleuteria
- Most awards: Ang Damgo ni Eleuteria (4)
- Most nominations: Amigo (10)

The 34th Gawad Urian Awards (Filipino: Ika-34 na Gawad Urian) is held on May 17, 2011. Established in 1976, the Gawad Urian Awards highlights the best of Philippine cinema as decided by the Filipino Film Critics. The best Philippine films for the year 2010 are honored in a ceremony at the Marriott Hotel in Pasay City. The Lifetime Achievement Award (Natatanging Gawad Urian Award) is conferred to screenwriter Jose "Pete" Lacaba.

== Winners and nominees ==
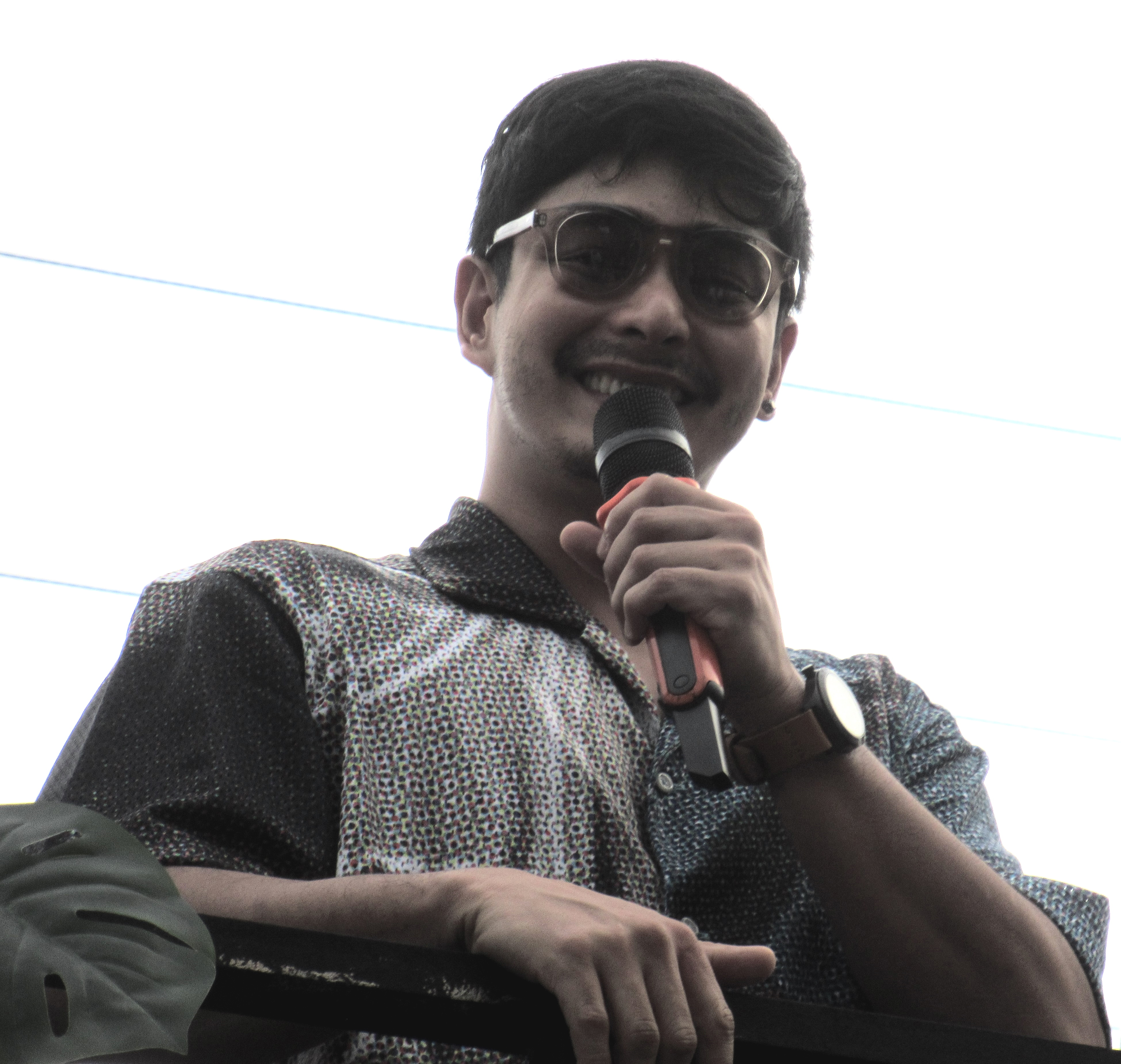
Coco Martin wins the Actor of the Decade recognition for his work during the 2000s.

Cherry Pie Picache is one of the two recipients of the Actress of the Decade recognition for her stellar body of work.

Winners are listed first and bolded.

Best Picture Pinakamahusay na Pelikula	Best Director Pinakamahusay na Direksyon
**Ang Damgo ni Eleuteria –** **Creative Programs Inc. & Panumduman Pictures**; Amigo – Anarchists' Convention Films; Ang Mundo sa Panahon ng Yelo – Cinemalaya Foundation & Sampaybakod Productions; Chassis – Happy Gilmore Productions; Halaw – Cinemalaya Foundation & Los Peliculas Linterna Studio; Limbunan – Cinemalaya Foundation & Bidadali House Productions; Noy – Cinemedia Films Inc., VIP Access Media Productions, Star Cinema & ABS-CBN Film Productions; Sheika – Cinemalaya Foundation, Skyweaver Production-Hydeout Entertainment & Alchemy of Vision and Light TV and Film Productions; Tsardyer – Creative Programs Inc. & Lasponggols Collective	**Remton Siega Zuasola – Ang Damgo ni Eleuteria**; Adolf Alix Jr. – Chassis; Arnel Mardoquio – Sheika; Dondon Santos – Noy; Gutierrez Mangansakan II – Limbunan; John Sayles – Amigo; Khavn – Maynila sa Mga Pangil ng Dilim; Mes de Guzman – Ang Mundo sa Panahon ng Bato; Mes de Guzman – Ang Mundo sa Panahon ng Yelo; Robin Fardig & Sherad Anthony Sanchez – Balangay; Sheron R. Dayoc – Halaw; Sigfreid Barros-Sanchez – Tsardyer
Best Actor Pinakamahusay na Pangunahing Aktor	Best Actress Pinakamahusay na Pangunahing Aktres
**Sid Lucero – Muli**; Coco Martin – Noy; Fanny Serrano – Tarima; Joel Torre – Amigo; John Arcilla – Halaw; Pen Medina – Layang Bilanggo; Perry Dizon – Sheika; Ronnie Lazaro – Ishmael; Sam Milby – Third World Happy	**Fe GingGing Hyde – Sheika**; Ces Quesada – Magkakapatid; Donna Isadora Gimeno – Ang Damgo ni Eleuteria; Jodi Sta. Maria – Chassis; Laurice Guillen – Karera; Mercedes Cabral – Gayuma; Meryll Soriano – Donor; Rita Avila – Magdamag
Best Supporting Actor Pinakamahusay na Pangalawang Aktor	Best Supporting Actress Pinakamahusay na Pangalawang Aktres
**Joem Bascon – Noy**; Cogie Domingo – Muli; Garret Dillahunt – Amigo; Gregg Tecson – Ang Damgo ni Eleuteria; Julio Diaz – Magkakapatid; Martin delos Santos – Tsardyer; Rocky Salumbides – Tarima; Tirso Cruz III – Sigwa; Yul Vazquez – Amigo	**Rosanna Roces – Presa**; Anita Linda – Presa; Liza Lorena – Presa; Lucia Jeuzan – Ang Damgo ni Eleuteria; Maria Isabel Lopez – Halaw; Rio Locsin – Amigo; Zsa Zsa Padilla – Sigwa
Best Screenplay Pinakamahusay na Dulang Pampelikula	Best Cinematography Pinakamahusay na Sinematograpiya
**Sheika**; Ang Damgo ni Eleuteria; Ang Mundo sa Panahon ng Bato; Ang Mundo sa Panahon ng Yelo; Chassis; Halaw; Limbunan; Maynila sa Mga Pangil ng Dilim; Noy; Presa; Tsardyer	**Ang Damgo ni Eleuteria**; Amigo; Ang Mundo sa Panahon ng Bato; Chassis; Dagim; Di Natatapos ang Gabi; Halaw; Limbunan; Tsardyer
Best Production Design Pinakamahusay na Disenyong Pamproduksyon	Best Editing Pinakamahusay na Editing
**Amigo**; Ang Damgo ni Eleuteria; Ang Mundo sa Panahon ng Bato; Chassis; Emir; Gayuma; Halaw; Limbunan; Sheika	**Sheika**; Halaw; Noy; Presa; Rekrut
Best Music Pinakamahusay na Musika	Best Sound Pinakamahusay na Tunog
**Ang Damgo ni Eleuteria**; Amigo; Ang Paglilitis ni Mang Serapio; Di Natatapos ang Gabi; Emir; Happyland; Sheika; Tsardyer	**Limbunan**; Amigo; Dagim; Halaw; Sampaguita; Sheika
Best Short Film Pinakamahusay na Maikling Pelikula	Best Documentary Pinakamahusay na Dokyumentaryo
**Huwag Kang Titingin**; Ang Katapusang Bagting; Ang Sandaling Sadya nina Lire at Isa; Boca; Despedida; Handum; Hollow; Kontrata; Mana; Nilda; P	**Kano: An American and His Harem**; Ang Panagtagbo sa Akong Mga Apohan; Eskrimadors; Sunday School; The Migrants

== Special Award ==
=== Natatanging Gawad Urian ===
- Jose "Pete" Lacaba

== Dekada Awards ==
=== Actor of the Decade (Natatanging Aktor ng Dekada) ===
- Coco Martin

=== Actress of the Decade (Natatanging Aktres ng Dekada) ===
- Cherry Pie Picache
- Gina Pareño

=== Films of the Decade (Natatanging Pelikula ng Dekada) ===
- Ang Pagdadalaga ni Maximo Oliveros – Auraeus Solito
- Babae sa Breakwater – Mario O'Hara
- Batang West Side – Lav Diaz
- Ebolusyon ng Pamilyang Pilipino – Lav Diaz
- Kinatay – Brillante Mendoza
- Kubrador – Jeffrey Jeturian
- Lola – Brillante Mendoza
- Magnifico – Maryo J. de los Reyes
- Serbis – Brillante Mendoza
- Tuhog – Jeffrey Jeturian

== Multiple nominations and awards ==
Films that received multiple nominations
Nominations	Films
10	Amigo
9	Ang Damgo ni Eleuteria
9	Halaw
9	Sheika
6	Chassis
6	Limbunan
6	Noy
6	Tsardyer
5	Presa
4	Ang Mundo sa Panahon ng Bato
3	Ang Mundo sa Panahon ng Yelo
2	Dagim
2	Di Natatapos ang Gabi
2	Emir
2	Gayuma
2	Magkakapatid
2	Maynila sa Mga Pangil ng Dilim
2	Muli
2	Sigwa
2	Tarima

Films that won multiple awards
Awards	Film
4	Ang Damgo ni Eleuteria
3	Sheika
