= List of Sana Dalawa ang Puso episodes =

Sana Dalawa ang Puso (Lit: Wish There Were Two Hearts / English: Two Hearts) is a 2018 Philippine romantic drama television series starring Jodi Sta. Maria in a dual role with Richard Yap and Robin Padilla. The series premiered on ABS-CBN's PrimeTanghali noontime block and worldwide on The Filipino Channel on January 29 to September 14, 2018, replacing Ikaw Lang ang Iibigin.

The series will mark the Sta. Maria-Yap reunion on television five years after the long-running pre-noontime drama Be Careful With My Heart.

== Series overview ==
Season	Episodes	Originally released	
Season	Episodes	First released	Last released
1	163	January 29, 2018	September 14, 2018

== Episodes ==
=== Season 1 (2018) ===
No. overall	No. in season	Title	Social media hashtag	Original air date	Kantar media rating (nationwide)
1	1	"Go!"	#SanaDalawaAngPusoGO	2014/11/11	19.9%
2	2	"Push"	#SanaDalawaAngPusoPush	2014/11/12	20.7%
3	3	"Idol"	#SanaDalawaAngPusoIdol	2011/11/13	20.7%
4	4	"Werpa" (Supportive)	#SanaDalawaAngPusoWerpa	2014/11/14	20.6%
5	5	"Fight"	#SanaDalawaAngPusoFight	2014/11/15	19.9%
6	6	"Ex-deal"	#SanaDalawaAngPusoExDeal	2014/11/16	16.8%
7	7	"Ampalaya" (Bitter)	#SanaDalawaAngPusoAmpalaya	2014/11/17	16.4%
8	8	"Asang Asa"	#SanaDalawaAngPusoAsangAsa	2014/11/18	16.6%
9	9	"Martin Mo!" (Your Martin!)	#SanaDalawaAngPusoMartinMo	2014/11/19	16.6%
10	10	"My Gad!" (My God!)	#SanaDalawaAngPusoMyGad	2014/11/20	14.7%
11	11	"Shookt"	#SanaDalawaAngPusoShookt	2014/11/21	17.4%
12	12	"Petmalu" (Awesome)	#SanaDalawaAngPusoPetmalu	2014/11/22	17.7%
13	13	"Hugot" (Pulled Emotions)	#SanaDalawaAngPusoHugot	2014/11/23	16.6%
14	14	"Asar Talo" (Defeated)	#SanaDalawaAngPusoAsarTalo	2014/11/24	17.2%
15	15	"Kapit Lang!" (Just Hold On)	#SanaDalawaAngPusoKapitLang	2014/11/25	16.1%
16	16	"Crush"	#SanaDalawaAngPusoCrush	2014/11/26	15.4%
17	17	"Big Time"	#SanaDalawaAngPusoBigTime	2014/11/27	15.7%
18	18	"Bokya" (Failure)	#SanaDalawaAngPusoBokya	2014/11/28	16.6%
19	19	"Lambing" (Fondly)	#SanaDalawaAngPusoLambing	2014/11/29	16.3%
20	20	"Excuse Me!"	#SanaDalawaAngPusoExcuseMe	2014/11/30	17.1%
21	21	"Tanggal Umay" (Fed-Up)	#SanaDalawaAngPusoTanggalUmay	2014/12/01	16.3%
22	22	"Sharamdara"	#SanaDalawaAngPusoSharamdara	2014/12/02	16.2%
23	23	"Galawang Leo"	#SanaDalawaAngPusoGalawangLeo	2014/12/03	16.4%
24	24	"Abot Kamay" (Within Reach)	#SanaDalawaAngPusoAbotKamay	2014/12/04	16.2%
25	25	"Humo-hopia"	#SanaDalawaAngPusoHumohopia	2014/12/05	15.5%
26	26	"Tugs Tugs"	#SanaDalawaAngPusoTugsTugs	2014/12/06	15.2%
27	27	"Choose Day"	#SanaDalawaAngPusoChooseDay	2014/12/07	15.1%
28	28	"Beast Mode"	#SanaDalawaAngPusoBeastMode	2014/12/08	14.4%
29	29	"Why, Oh Why!"	#SanaDalawaAngPusoWhyOhWhy	2014/12/09	15.3%
30	30	"Face 2 Face"	#Sana2AngPusoFace2Face	2014/12/10	15.4%
31	31	"x2" (Times 2)	#SanaDalawaAngPusoX2	2014/12/11	17.1%
32	32	"Push Pa More" (Push More)	#SanaDalawaAngPusoPushPaMore	2014/12/12	17.4%
33	33	"LOVEBAN Lang"	#SanaDalawaAngPusoLOVEbanLang	2014/12/13	17.2%
34	34	"Best Offer"	#SanaDalawaAngPusoBestOffer	2014/12/14	18.1%
35	35	"Game Plan"	#SanaDalawaAngPusoGamePlan	2014/12/15	17.7%
36	36	"Oplan How2BU"	#SanaDalawaAngPusoOplanHow2BU	2014/12/16	17.8%
37	37	"Next Step"	#SanaDalawaAngPusoNextStep	2014/12/17	17.5%
38	38	"Achieve"	#SanaDalawaAngPusoAchieve	2014/12/18	17.8%
39	39	'"Triggerdt"	#SanaDalawaAngPusoTriggerdt	2014/12/19	18.0%
40	40	"Game Face On"	#SanaDalawaAngPusoGameFaceOn	2014/12/20	17.7%
41	41	"Tiwala Lang" (Trust Me)	#SanaDalawaAngPusoTiwalaLang	2014/12/21	18.7%
42	42	"LISAfied"	#SanaDalawaAngPusoLISAfied	2014/12/22	18.6%
43	43	"Bakod Moves" (Enclosed Moves)	#SanaDalawaAngPusoBakodMoves	2014/12/23	17.8%
44	44	"Sorry, Sorry"	#S2PSorrySorry	2014/12/24	17.3%
45	45	"Taguan Ng Feelings" (My Covered Feelings)	#S2PTaguanNgFeelings	2014/12/25	15.4%
46	46	"Todo Todo Walang Preno" (Todo, Todo, No Brakes)	#S2PTodoTodoWalangPreno	2014/12/26	16.0%
47	47	"Love is in the Air"	#S2PLoveIsInTheAir	2014/12/27	15.7%
48	48	"The One And Only"	#S2PTheOneAndOnly	2014/12/28	15.7%
49	49	"Battle Of The Hopias" (Battle of Hopes)	#S2PBattleOfTheHopias	2014/12/29	18.3%
50	50	"Lakas Tama" (Right Energy)	#S2PLakasTama	2014/12/30	16.6%
51	51	"Lagot Ka Huli Ka" (You Broke You Last)	#S2PLagotKaHuliKa	2014/12/31	16.2%
52	52	"Back 2 Back Moment"	#S2PBack2BackMoment	2015/01/01	17.9%
53	53	"EXsena Level Up" (Drama Level Up)	#S2PEXsenaLevelUp	2015/01/02	17.6%
54	54	"Beast Mood"	#S2PBeastMood	2015/01/03	17.3%
55	55	"Fight, Fight, Fight!"	#S2PFightFightFight	2015/01/04	17.0%
56	56	"Lab O Laban" (Love or Conflict)	#S2PLabOLaban	2015/01/05	17.3%
57	57	"Friend Zoned"	#S2PFriendZoned	2015/01/06	16.0%
58	58	"GBye" (Goodbye)	#S2PGbye	2016/01/07	17.1%
59	59	"Danger Zone"	#S2PDangerZone	2015/01/08	16.4%
60	60	"First Love"	#S2PFirstLove	2015/01/09	16.5%
61	61	"Run and Hide"	#S2PRunAndHide	2015/01/10	17.9%
62	62	"Isa Dalawa Takbo" (One, Two, Run!)	#S2PIsaDalawaTakbo	2015/01/11	16.2%
63	63	"Dobol Trobol" (Double Trouble)	#S2PDobolTrobol	2015/01/12	17.3%
64	64	"Love vs Isip" (Love vs Mind)	#S2PLoveVsIsip	2015/01/13	17.6%
65	65	"May Aamin" (With Our)	#S2PMayAamin	2015/01/14	16.4%
66	66	"Hinahanap Hanap Kita" (Looking For You)	#S2PHinahanaphanapKita	2015/01/15	17.5%
67	67	"One Step Closer"	#S2POneStepCloser	2015/01/16	16.4%
68	68	"Love Makes Time"	#S2PLoveMakesTime	2015/01/17	15.3%
69	69	"The 2 Faces of Love"	#S2PThe2FacesOfLove	2015/01/18	15.8%
70	70	"Bridezilla"	#S2PBridezilla	2015/01/19	18.6%
71	71	"Kasal" (Wedding)	#S2PKasal	2015/01/20	17.1%
72	72	"Fake Bride"	#S2PFakeBride	2015/01/21	17.7%
73	73	"The Secret is out"	#S2PTheSecretisOut	2015/01/22	16.8%
74	74	"Move on Move on Na" (Move on Move on That)	#S2PMoveOnMoveOnNa	2015/01/23	14.7%
75	75	"Epek 2 Ng Love" (Epek 2 Of Love)	#S2PEpek2NgLove	2015/01/24	15.2%
76	76	"Isang Harana" (A Harana)	#S2PIsangHarana	2015/01/25	14.5%
77	77	"New Life New Look"	#S2PNewLifeNewLook	2015/01/26	16.8%
78	78	"Tagpuan" (Convergence)	#S2PTagpuan	2015/01/27	16.4%
79	79	"Determinado" (Determined)	#S2PDeterminado	2015/01/28	18.0%
80	80	"No Boundaries"	#S2PNoBoundaries	2015/01/29	16.0%
81	81	"Bitter Sweet"	#S2PBitterSweet	2015/01/30	16.4%
82	82	"Tiwala Lang" (Just Trust)	#S2PTiwalaLang	2015/01/31	15.0%
83	83	"I Choose You"	#S2PIChooseYou	2015/02/01	16.1%
84	84	"Aray Naku"	#S2PArayNaku	2015/02/02	15.5%
85	85	"Choice Day"	#S2PChoiceDay	2015/02/03	15.4%
86	86	"Kilig 2 Da Bones"	#S2PKilig2DaBones	2015/02/04	14.7%
87	87	"Da Moves"	#S2PDaMoves	2015/02/05	15.8%
88	88	"Lucky Charm"	#S2P	2015/02/06	18.5%
89	89	"Road Trip"	#S2PRoadTrip	2015/02/07	17.1%
90	90	"Propose 2 Propose"	#S2PPropose2Propose	2015/02/08	15.9%
91	91	"Road Rage"	#S2PRoadRage	2015/02/09	17.0%
92	92	"Love Hate"	#S2PLoveHate	2015/02/10	17.7%
93	93	"Now or Never"	#S2PNoworNever	2015/02/11	17.2%
94	94	"i LEOve You LisaLisa"	#S2PiLEOveYouLisa	2015/02/12	15.3%
95	95	"Honeymoon"	#S2PHoneymoon	2015/02/13	18.0%
96	96	"Love vs Family"	#S2PLovevsFamily	2015/02/14	17.2%
97	97	"Ups and Downs"	#S2PUpsandDowns	2015/02/15	15.7%
98	98	"Da Struggle is Real"	#S2PDaStruggleisReal	2015/02/16	15.9%
99	99	"Quality Time"	#S2PQualityTime	2015/02/17	14.5%
100	100	"Make or Break"	#S2PMakeorBreak	2015/02/18	15.1%
101	101	"Sigaw ng Damdamin" (Cry of Emotion)	#S2PSigawngDamdamin	2015/02/19	14.6%
102	102	"Party Party"	#S2PPartyParty	2015/02/20	15.0%
103	103	"Haba ng Hair" (Hair Length)	#S2PHabangHair	2015/02/21	15.4%
104	104	"Apology Accepted"	#S2PApologyAccepted	2015/02/22	14.8%
105	105	"Balik Loob" (Back Inside)	#S2PBalikLoob	2015/02/23	15.7%
106	106	"EXpectDaUnEXpected"	#S2PEXpectDaUnEXpected	2015/02/24	16.1%
107	107	"Harapan"	#S2PHarapan	2015/02/25	15.9%
108	108	"Closure"	#S2PClosure	2015/02/26	16.0%
109	109	"Love Always Wins"	#S2PLoveAlwaysWins	2015/02/27	14.2%
110	110	"Goodbye Tagpuan"	#S2PGoodbyeTagpuan	2015/02/28	15.2%
111	111	"Buo ang Loob" (Full the Inside)	#S2PBuoAngLoob	2015/03/01	16.1%
112	112	"Sakit sa Heart" (Heart Pain)	#S2PSakitSaHeart	2015/03/02	TBA
113	113	"Never Let Go"	#S2PNeverLetGo	2015/03/03	15.5%
114	114	"New Start"	#S2PNewStart	2015/03/04	15.4%
115	115	"Under Pressure"	#S2PUnderPressure	2015/03/05	14.4%
116	116	"Silence"	#S2PSilence	2015/03/06	15.5%
117	117	"Small World"	#S2PSmallWorld	2015/03/07	15.8%
118	118	"Find Out"	#S2PFindOut	2015/03/08	14.5%
119	119	"Da Works"	#S2PDaWorks	2015/03/09	TBA
120	120	"Ghost of the Past"	#S2PGhostOfThePast	2015/03/10	16.9%
121	121	"In Danger"	#S2PInDanger	2015/03/11	15.8%
122	122	"Da Return Of Da Past"	#S2PDaReturnOfDaPast	2015/03/12	15.6%
123	123	"Deep Trouble"	#S2PDeepTrouble	2015/03/13	15.9%
124	124	"Da Rescue"	#S2PDaRescue	2015/03/14	14.1%
125	125	"Blast From the Past"	#S2PBlastFromThePast	2015/03/15	15.1%
126	126	"Training 4 Action"	#S2PTraining4Action	2015/03/16	14.7%
127	127	"Undercover"	#S2PUndercover	2015/03/17	15.4%
128	128	"Go Signal"	#S2PGoSignal	2015/03/18	15.7%
129	129	"Job Offer"	#S2PJobOffer	2015/03/19	15.8%
130	130	"Principals Office"	#S2PPrincipalsOffice	2015/03/20	14.1%
131	131	"It's a Trap"	#S2PItsATrap	2015/03/21	15.1%
132	132	"Caught in the Act"	#S2PCaughtInTheAct	2015/03/22	15.1%
133	133	"Catfight"	#S2PCatfight	2015/03/23	14.5%
134	134	"Partners in Crime"	#S2PPartnersInCrime	2015/03/24	14.7%
135	135	"Fishing"	#S2PFishing	2015/03/25	16.1%
136	136	"Choose Your Battles"	#S2PChooseYourBattles	2015/03/26	15.4%
137	137	"Sikretong Malupit" (Cruel Secret)	#S2PSikretongMalupit	2015/03/27	14.2%
138	138	"Patibayan ng Heart"	#S2PPatibayanNgHeart	2015/03/28	16.0%
139	139	"Red Alert"	#S2PRedAlert	2015/03/29	15.4%
140	140	"The War is On"	#S2PTheWarIsOn	2015/03/30	16.2%
141	141	"Hot Seat"	#S2PHotSeat	2015/03/31	16.3%
142	142	"New Mission"	#S2PNewMission	2015/04/01	14.6%
143	143	"Mission Accepted"	#S2PMissionAccepted	2015/04/02	15.2%
144	144	"Double Reveal"	#S2PDoubleReveal	2015/04/03	14.4%
145	145	"Too Many Questions"	#S2PTooManyQuestions	2015/04/04	15.9%
146	146	"Hold on Tight"	#S2PHoldOnTight	2015/04/05	14.4%
147	147	"Blamestorming"	#S2PBlamestorming	2015/04/06	13.9%
148	148	"Big Announcement"	#S2PBigAnnouncement	2015/04/07	13.3%
149	149	"Subukan ng Tiwala" (Try a Trust)	#S2PSubukanNgTiwala	2015/04/08	13.5%
150	150	"Emergency"	#S2PEmergency	2015/04/09	14.1%
151	151	"Double Effort"	#S2PDoubleEffort	2015/04/10	13.2%
152	152	"Love Problems"	#S2PLoveProblems	2015/04/11	13.5%
153	153	"Hopes Up"	#S2PHopesUp	2015/04/12	13.1%
154	154	"Dagsa ang Truth"	#S2PDagsaAngTruth	2015/04/13	13.2%
155	155	"Kambal na Pasabog" (Twin Blast)	#S2PKambalNaPasabog	2015/04/14	13.3%
156	156	"Kambal na Gulo" (Twin That Mess)	#S2PKambalNaGulo	2015/04/15	13.9%
157	157	"Imbestiga Pa More" (Investigate More)	#S2PImbestigaPaMore	2015/04/16	13.5%
158	158	"Bukingan Na"	#S2PBukinganNa	2015/04/17	14.8%
159	159	"The Last Switch"	#S2PTheLastSwitch	2015/04/18	14.0%
160	160	"The Last Shot"	#S2PTheLastShot	2015/04/19	14.5%
161	161	"The Last Sign"	#S2PTheLastSign	2015/04/20	14.5%
162	162	"The Last Chance"	#S2PTheLastChance	2015/04/21	15.0%
163	163	"Heart 2 Heart Finale"	#Heart2HeartFinale	2015/04/22	16.1%
