= Possession of Clarita Villanueva =

1953 incident in the Philippines

An alleged demonic possession occurred in May 1953 when Clarita Villanueva, a 17-year-old girl incarcerated at the Manila City Jail in the Philippines, was said to have been bitten and tormented by two demonic entities and their followers. American pastor Lester Sumrall was building a church in Manila, when the news broke of Villanueva's possession. The case was widely and sensationally reported worldwide.

== Background ==
Clarita Villanueva, whose mother was a spiritist from Saint Mary's University and a fortune teller, never knew her father. When she was 17 years old, her mother died, forcing her into a life of prostitution. She did not have an immediate family to take care of her and she became a vagabond. From her province, Nueva Vizcaya, she made her way to Cauayan, Isabela, in the summer of 1953 looking for her father and settled in the district of Minante Dos. Villanueva frequented the bars and taverns of the city and solicited men for harlotry. On May 6, 1953, she mistakenly offered her service to a plainclothes police officer and was incarcerated at the Old Bilibid Prison (now the Manila City Jail), as she was a minor and prostitution was illegal. According to the grandson of the judge who handled Villanueva's case, she was possessed in the middle of a hearing.

Villanueva described her attackers as a "very big dark man with curly hair all over the body" and "a body with an angelic face and a big mustache". Sumrall also said that Villanueva was Visayan and can only speak the Tagalog language. However, she was able to speak English during the alleged possession.

== Timeline ==
=== May 7 ===
Clarita Villanueva was arrested on charges of vagrancy. It was unclear, however, if she was also arrested on charges of prostitution.

=== May 19 ===
Villanueva was surrounded by "about 100 medical specialists, nurses and Pressmen" according to Rodolfo Nazareno, a reporter for the United Press. According to records, this was the first day when Pastor Lester Sumrall and Villanueva met, with the girl stating her hatred towards the pastor and God, and making blasphemous statements.

=== May 20 ===
Manila Mayor Arsenio Lacson, who received reports about the incident, ordered that Villanueva be brought to the city morgue so that he could see for himself. Within 15 minutes of sitting beside next to her, bite marks appeared on her index finger and neck. Lacson said that he saw the human bitemarks where Villanueva had been bitten, and that "they were not made by her". Lacson was holding her hands when she was bitten. Villanueva had been examined and was declared as mentally sound.

=== May 22 ===
After three days of confrontation, Sumrall stated that the "miracle of God" came upon her and that Villanueva said "He (the devil) went that way" and "He's gone". The third day was the final time that the demons reportedly tormented her before fleeing in defeat.

== In popular culture ==
- The 2019 Filipino supernatural horror film Clarita was based on the events. Jodi Sta. Maria portrayed Villanueva in the film.
- Kapuso Mo, Jessica Soho featured a story regarding the incident on Gabi ng Lagim IV.
- Ripley's Believe It or Not!'s "True Ghost Stories" featured the story as "The Fiendish Spectre."
- Featured in Strange than Science by Frank Edwards. The specific story references fang marks instead of teeth marks.
