= Diplomat Hotel =

Abandoned hotel in Baguio, Philippines

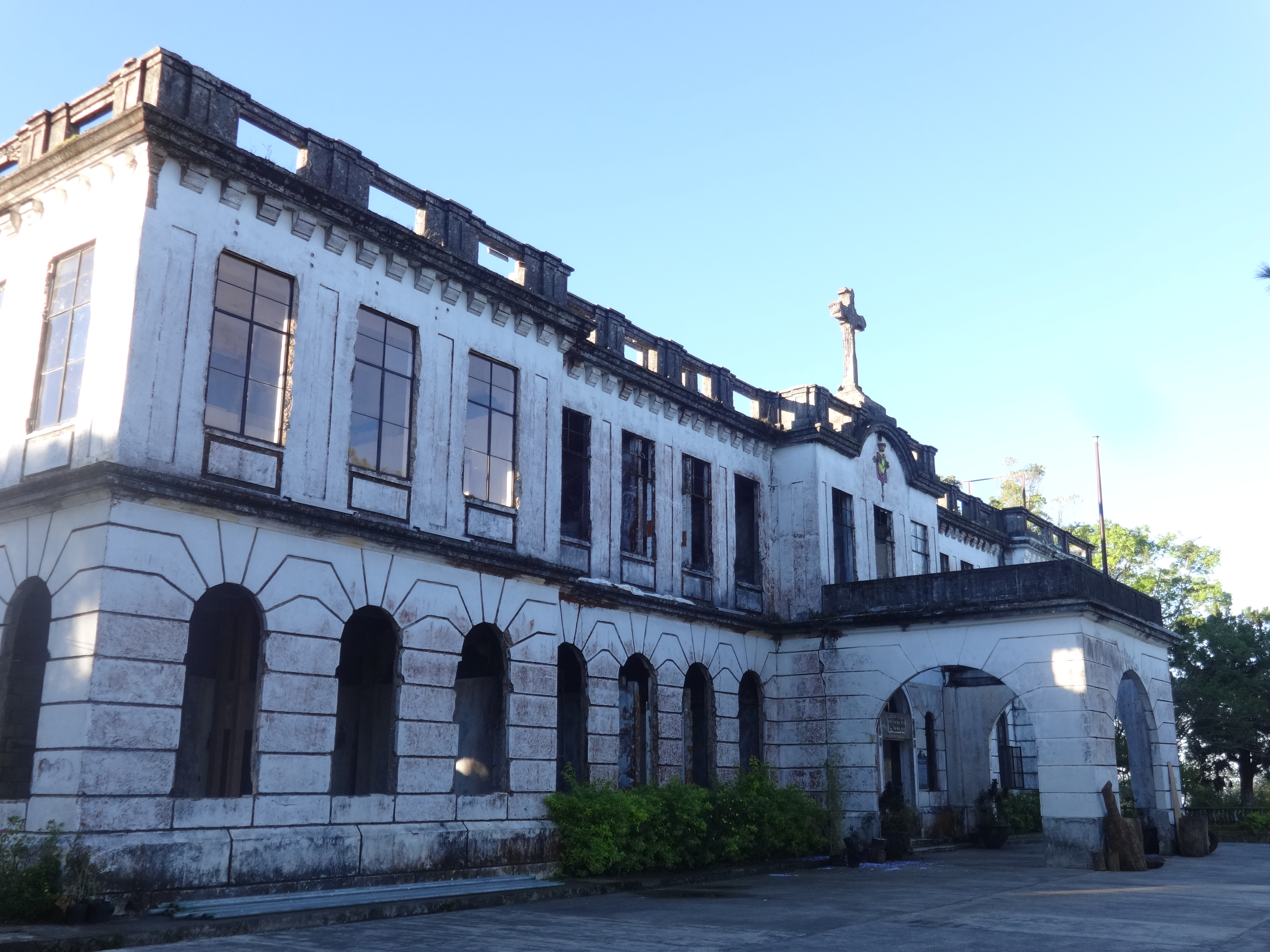
- Interactive map of the Diplomat Hotel area
- Alternative names: Diplomat Hotel

General information
- Status: Completed
- Location: Dominican-Mirador, Baguio, Benguet, Philippines
- Construction started: 1913
- Completed: May 1915
- Owner: Diplomat Hotels, Inc.(1973-1987); City Government of Baguio (since 2005)

Design and construction
- Architect: Roque Ruaño

The Baguio City Heritage Hill and Nature Park (formerly and still commonly known as the Diplomat Hotel) is an abandoned structure atop Dominican Hill, Baguio, Philippines. The local government initiated rehabilitation efforts, which was started in April 2022, through a 15 million Philippine pesos grant from the National Commission for Culture and the Arts. The whole property on which it stands has been renamed as the Dominican Heritage Hill and Nature Park. A panoramic view of the city unfolds from its vantage point, the stone crucifix on the outdoor patio of the hotel's second floor.

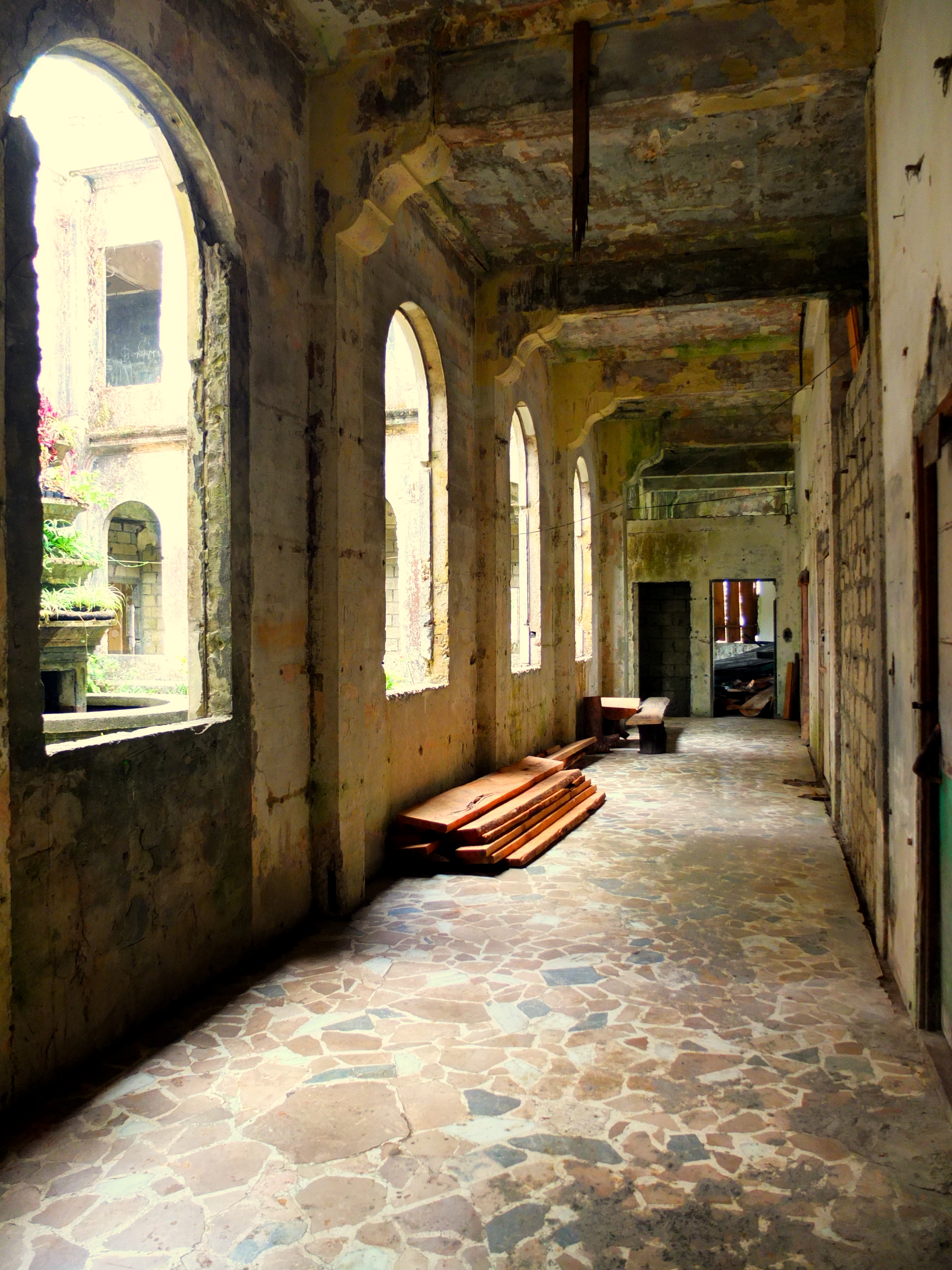
One of the corridors at the west wing of the Dominican Hill Retreat House. One of the former hotel's two fountains can be seen in the far left.

== History ==
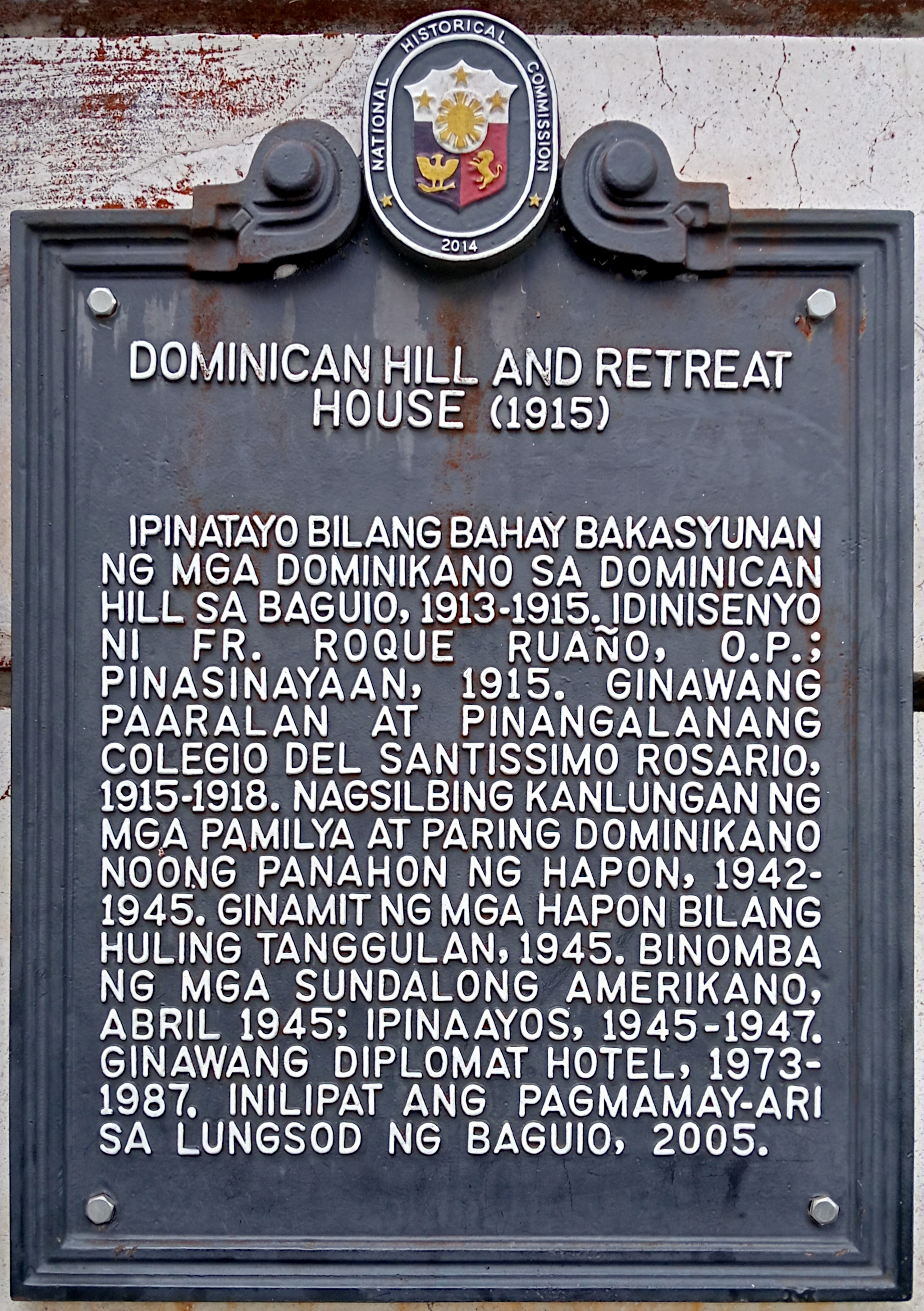
Historical marker installed in 2014

=== Dominican vacation house ===
In 1911, American friars of the Order of Preachers (commonly known as "Dominican Order") along with a few Spanish members made plans for the construction of a vacation house for them and the nuns of their order in Baguio. One of the members of the order, Fr. Roque Ruaño, O.P., the same architect of the main building of the current campus of the University of Santo Tomas, designed the building. A 17-hectare hill property was acquired from Americans who reside in Baguio and construction is said to have started in 1913 and was supervised by Ruano himself. It was then inaugurated in May 1915. To take advantage of tax exemptions, the order set up a seminary named Colegio del Santissimo Rosario in June 1915 but due to the very small enrollment, the school closed two years later and the building was reverted to its original use. The hill where the building stands was christened as "Dominican Hill".

During World War II, the people fleeing from the Japanese sought refuge within its walls. Japanese forces invaded the property and turned it into their headquarters, making it as the last bastion and garrison of the Japanese Imperial Army. War crimes in the forms of tortures, rapes, and executions were done, the majority of the victims being priests, nuns, as well as refugees. They were tied into the trees and repeatedly stabbed or shot; their bones and skulls were found near the fountain. The building also served as a camp for the secret police, Kempeitai, who also made it a comfort station where trafficked women were kept and abused. During the liberation of the Philippines in April 1945, the American forces bombed the place and partially hit the right wing of the building while Japanese forces committed suicide. Between 1945 and 1947, the building underwent restoration and was used again by the same Catholic order.

=== As a hotel ===
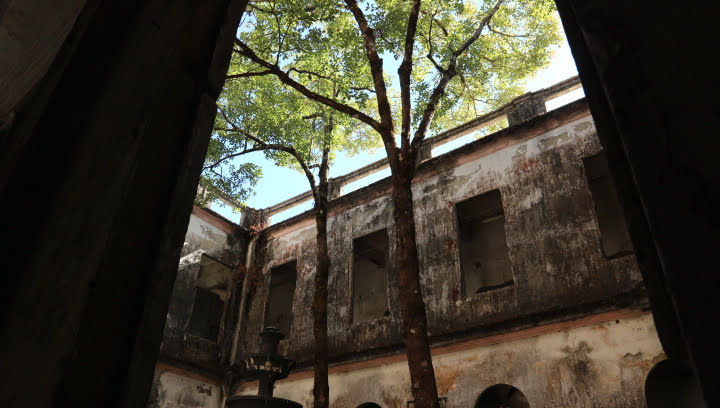
The inner garden at the east wing of the building. One of the hotel's two fountains can be seen at the bottom.

Diplomat Hotels, Inc. acquired ownership of the property in 1973 and remodeled thoroughly the interior into a 33-bedroom hotel but still retaining the unique features which was earlier established by the Dominican friars. The hotel was managed by Antonio Agapito "Tony" Agpaoa, a Baguio-based entrepreneur and faith healer famous for psychic surgery. Agpaoa suffered a heart attack and was diagnosed with brain hemorrhage in the 1980s. He died in 1987 of the ailments. Since his death, the hotel ceased operations and was abandoned. Following its abandonment, the place was looted and sacked. The building also sustained significant damage during the 1990 Luzon earthquake.

== Recent use ==
The Housing and Urban Development Coordinating Council, formerly known as the Ministry of Human Settlements, took over the ownership of the hotel which soon became an asset for the Presidential Management Staff (PMS).

The property was then conveyed to the City Government of Baguio through TCT No. T-85948 on 5 April 2005 and it was renamed as the Dominican Heritage Hill and Nature Park. The deed of conveyance set by the Presidential Management Staff and city resolutions would obligate the city of Baguio in the rehabilitation and the development of the property. The property is now under the maintenance of the City Environment and Parks Management Office (CEPMO).

In May 2012, Baguio inaugurated two new function halls in the hotel as part of the development of the property as a preserved heritage site and to promote tourism. The halls could be rented for P200 an hour or P2,000 a day for weddings, trainings and workshops among others.

The entire property was declared as a historical site through City Resolution No. 168, series of 2013. It gained its National Historical Site status from the National Historical Commission of the Philippines in September 2014.

The city used the property as an art center for the launching of the Entacool Festival following Baguio's conferment as a Creative City by the United Nations Educational, Scientific, and Cultural Organization (UNESCO) in 2017. Entacool is a fusion of the Cordilleran word "entaku" which means "let's all go" and the word "cool" to signify Baguio's cool climate. The former hotel hosted numerous art exhibits such as paintings, bamboo installations, sculptures, and a photo exhibit during the run of the festival. It would serve the same function for the 2019 and 2020 editions of the Baguio Creative City Festival now named as the Ibagiw Festival. Ibagiw was derived from the word bagiw which is a moss that commonly grows around the city.

In 2019, the city government announced that the area will serve as a haven for the city's artists and artisans as a way to sustain its Creative City designation.

The place is a favorite spot for photography, airsoft tournaments, film making, wedding receptions and photography, cosplay photoshoots and many more.

== In popular culture ==
The hotel is considered by paranormal believers to be haunted by restless spirits due to its brutal World War II history and is considered by these believers as a "ghost magnet." Phantom Japanese soldiers, headless nuns, disembodied crying voices, moans and screams as well as apparitions in photographs taken within the property have been reported. It was featured on television programs: Magandang Gabi, Bayan's 2004 Halloween Special, AHA!, and Kapuso Mo, Jessica Soho's 2016 and 2023 Halloween Specials.
