= Third World Happy =

2010 Filipino film by EJ Salcedo

- Film poster
- Directed by: EJ Salcedo
- Starring: Sam Milby; Jodi Sta. Maria
- Distributed by: Cinema One Originals
- Release dates: November 11, 2010 (Cinema One Originals Digital Film Festival); May 25, 2011 (Cinema One)
- Running time: 100 minutes
- Country: Philippines
- Language: Filipino

Third World Happy is a 2010 Philippine drama film directed by EJ Salcedo and starring Sam Milby and Jodi Sta. Maria as former partners. The film debuted 11 November 2010 at the Cinema One Originals Digital Film Festival, and had theatrical release across the Philippines on May 25, 2011.

== Plot ==
Wesley (Sam Milby) was a Fil-Am and a naturalized citizen when he left Philippines 12 years earlier. In America, he aspired to become a painter, and revealed that his parents died before he left the country to finish his dreams, he became a Fulbright scholar to achieve it. Years later, he received a phone call that his loved one had died and he was required to visit the wake. There he met his ex-girlfriend (Jodi Sta. Maria), his friends, his aunt and his own older brother, who will be his guide to give him a shining light and give him the courage to look at the coffin and say his last goodbyes. It is revealed that his Kuya Danny was the dead one after all, he has a kid with his ex-girlfriend which she declined to introduce to him.

== Cast ==
- Sam Milby as Wesley
- Jodi Sta. Maria as Aylynn
- Melissa Mendez as Aunt Beth
- Archie Alemania as Lyndon
- Richard Quan as Danny
- Archie Adamos as Tiyong Boy
- Raul Morit as Mang Teng
- Geraldine Tan as Aylynn's mother
- Eugene Herrera as Dexter

== Accolades ==
- 2010, Won Festival Prize for 'Best Supporting Actress' for Jodi Sta. Maria at Cinema One Originals Digital Film Festival
- 2010, Nominated for Festival Prize as 'Best Picture' for EJ Salcedo at Cinema One Originals Digital Film Festival
- 2011, Nominated for a Gawad Urian Award for 'Best Actor' for Sam Milby at the 34th Gawad Urian Awards
