= KMJS' Gabi ng Lagim: The Movie =

2025 Filipino horror film

- Theatrical release poster
- Directed by: Yam Laranas (segment "Pocong"); Dodo Dayao (segment "Berbalang"); King Mark Baco (segment "Sanib")
- Screenplay by: Yam Laranas; Onay Sales-Camero; Anton Santamaria; Dodo Dayao
- Produced by: Nessa S. Valdellon
- Starring: Jillian Ward; Elijah Canlas; Sanya Lopez; Miguel Tanfelix
- Narrated by: Jessica Soho
- Cinematography: Yam Laranas; Albert Banzon; Rommel Andred C. Sales
- Edited by: Melody Mae Carzon; Lawrence S. Ang; Benjo Ferrer
- Music by: Von de Guzman; Francis de Veyra; Emerzon Texon
- Production companies: GMA Pictures; GMA Public Affairs
- Distributed by: Sony Pictures Releasing International
- Release date: November 26, 2025
- Country: Philippines
- Language: Filipino
- Box office: ₱41 million

KMJS' Gabi ng Lagim: The Movie is a Filipino horror anthology film that was presented by Jessica Soho in celebration of Kapuso Mo, Jessica Soho's 20th anniversary. Produced by GMA Pictures and GMA Public Affairs, it is a film adaptation of KMJS' Gabi ng Lagim and features three stories of real-life paranormal experiences.

The film was released on November 26, 2025.

== Cast ==
=== Pocong ===
- Miguel Tanfelix as Mark
- Kristoffer Martin as Rollie
- Jon Lucas as Emil
- Phi Palmos as Louie
- Art Acuña as Captain
- Karl Medina as Bosun
- Arra San Agustin as Gigi

=== Berbalang ===
- Elijah Canlas as Kain
- Sanya Lopez as Delilah
- Rocco Nacino as Leland
- Mikoy Morales as Cisco
- Jojit Lorenzo as Mang Abner

=== Sanib ===
- Jillian Ward as Angel
- Martin del Rosario as Fr. Rex
- Epy Quizon as Fr. Azul
- Ashley Ortega as Diana
- Therese Malvar as Tere
- Lotlot de Leon as Lita

== Production ==
On February 4, 2024, journalist Jessica Soho announced that Gabi ng Lagim; an annual Halloween television special from her news magazine show Kapuso Mo, Jessica Soho would have a film called KMJS' Gabi ng Lagim: The Movie in celebration of the show's 20th anniversary.

KMJS' Gabi ng Lagim: The Movie features three "true-to-life" stories about paranormal experiences and was produced by GMA Public Affairs and GMA Pictures, with Sony Pictures Releasing International as the distributor. A story pitching contest was opened for the month where Filipinos 18-years of age and above were encouraged to submit stories which served as the basis of the film. The submissions were judged on three criteria; authenticity, viability for film adaptation, and uniqueness.

== Release ==
KMJS' Gabi ng Lagim: The Movie was released in cinemas in the Philippines on November 26, 2025. This was the second film to be released under GMA Pictures' distribution deal with American film company Columbia Pictures (through the Sony Pictures Releasing International label).
