= Sana Dalawa ang Puso =

2018 Philippine television drama series

- Title card
- Genre: Drama; Romantic comedy
- Created by: ABS-CBN Studios; Henry King Quitain; Olivia Lamasan
- Developed by: ABS-CBN Studios
- Written by: Generiza Francisco; Ceres Helga Barrios; Mary Pearl Urtola
- Directed by: Rory B. Quintos; Mae Czarina Cruz-Alviar; Nuel C. Naval; Dado C. Lumibao; Frasco Santos Mortiz; Julius Ruslin Alfonso
- Starring: Jodi Sta. Maria; Richard Yap; Robin Padilla
- Opening theme: "Sana Dalawa ang Puso Ko" by Jona and Daryl Ong
- Composer: Bodjie Dasig
- Country of origin: Philippines
- Original language: Filipino
- No. of seasons: 1
- No. of episodes: 163 (list of episodes)

Production
- Executive producers: Carlo Katigabk; Cory Vidanes; Laurenti Dyogi; Malou Santos
- Producers: Marie Kris Macas; Des M. De Guzman
- Cinematography: A.B. Garcia
- Editors: Ray Ann Endaya; Arjay Felizarta; Godwin Lucena
- Running time: 25–30 minutes
- Production company: Star Creatives

Original release
- Network: ABS-CBN
- Release: January 29 – September 14, 2018

Sana Dalawa ang Puso (International title: Two Hearts / transl. I Wish There Were Two Hearts) is a 2018 Philippine television drama romantic comedy series broadcast by ABS-CBN. Directed by Rory B. Quintos, Mae Czarina Cruz-Alviar, Nuel C. Naval, Dado C. Lumibao, Frasco Santos Mortiz and Julius Ruslin Alfonso, it stars Jodi Sta. Maria, Richard Yap and Robin Padilla. It aired on the network's PrimeTanghali line-up from and worldwide on TFC from January 29 to September 14, 2018, replacing Ikaw Lang ang Iibigin and was replaced by Playhouse.

== Synopsis ==
The story revolves around Mona and Lisa: two different women with identical faces, both facing challenging ordeals in their lives.

Lisa is a strict and hardworking boss in her father's business, the Laureano Group of Companies. Her world suddenly turns upside down when her father Juancho betroths her to their business rival's son Martin Co. In order to avoid the arranged marriage, Lisa hides with one of her workers, Leo Tabayoyong.

Mona, a tomboyish girl and Lisa's look-alike, works as a bet collector in cockfights and is struggling to save her father from peril after he gets involved in a networking scam.

What will happen if the two women with the same face cross paths? Will they be able to solve each other's problems?

In the end, it is revealed that Mona and Lisa are the identical twin daughters of Sandra Tan.

== Cast and characters ==
=== Main cast ===
- Jodi Sta. Maria as Ramona "Mona" Bulalayao / Ramona Tan-Co and Elisabeth "Lisa" Laureano / Elisabeth Tan-Tabayoyong
- Richard Yap as Martin Co
- Robin Padilla as Leonardo "Leo" Tabayoyong

=== Supporting cast ===
- Christopher de Leon as Juancho Laureano
- Alma Moreno as Lena Bulalayao
- Edgar Mortiz as Ramon Bulalayao
- Boboy Garovillo as Miguel Co
- Denise Laurel as Primera Ortega
- Irma Adlawan as Sandra Tan
- Pinky Amador as Adele Laureano
- Bayani Agbayani as Victory "Oyo" Domingo
- Nikki Valdez as Kimberly "Kim" Torres
- Kitkat as Libereta "Leb" Manatad
- Miles Ocampo as Christina "Tinay" Tabayoyong
- Ylona Garcia as Tadhana "Tads" Tabayoyong
- Aliya Parcs as Rachel Sovichel
- Carla Martinez as Teresa "Resa" Co
- Annali "Ali" Forbes as Theresa "Tisay" Tabayoyong
- Elia Ilano as Tamarra "TamTam" Tabayoyong
- William Lorenzo as Jason Chua
- Lito Pimentel as Leader Rizal
- Rey "PJ" Abellana as Director Luna
- Alexander Diaz as Jacinto
- Maika Rivera as Irish
- Ryan Bang as Chot
- Leo Martinez as Mr. Supapi
- Markus Paterson as Patrick Sovichel
- Henz Villaraiz as Carlos "Cocoy" Mendiola

=== Extended cast ===
- Ariel Ureta as Jacob Co
- Pinky Marquez as Joana Chavez
- Ramon Christopher as John Chavez
- Arlene Muhlach as Baby Ortega
- Junjun Quintana as Steve Co
- Marc Acueza as Jason Chavez
- Hannah Ledesma as Georgina
- Hyubs Azarcon as Dongs
- Gerard Acao as George
- Kiray Celis as Anya
- Angelo Ilagan as Ian
- Heaven Peralejo as Sitti
- Raine Salamante as Carol
- Anna Vicente as Emily
- CK Kieron as Ethan
- Patrick Sugui as Nick
- Manuel Chua as Emil

=== Guest cast ===
- Jana Agoncillo as young Lisa and Mona
- Patrick Garcia as young Juancho
- Simon Ibarra
- Victor Silayan as Donnie Pamintuan
- Boom Labrusca as Marlon Fernandez
- Paolo Paraiso as Anthony Falconia
- Kiel Ortega as Paolo Azarcon
- Pilita Corrales as Leonora Chavez
- Kristine Abbey as Facilitator

== Reruns ==
The show began airing reruns on Jeepney TV from April 5 to July 23, 2021 (replacing the reruns of Bagani and was replaced by the reruns of Sandugo); and September 5 to December 23, 2022 (replacing the reruns of Hanggang Saan and was replaced by the reruns of Magkaribal).

It also aired on ALLTV from September 26, 2022 to March 5, 2023 (as a recap from Jeepney TV, and was replaced by the reruns of Sandugo); and October 23, 2023 to April 14, 2024 (replacing the reruns of Sino ang Maysala?: Mea Culpa and was replaced by the programming block of Jeepney TV sa ALLTV).

== Ratings ==
Kantar Media National TV Ratings (11:30am PST)
Pilot Episode	Finale Episode	Peak	Average
19.9% January 29, 2018	16.1% September 14, 2018	20.7% January 30, 2018	TBD

== See also ==
- List of programs broadcast by ABS-CBN
- List of ABS-CBN Studios original drama series
