= Bungisngis =

Philippine mythical creature

Origin
- Region: Philippines

Bungisngis is a one-eyed giant in Philippine folklore. This giant, purported to dwell in Meluz, Orion, Bataan and Batangas and is described as always laughing. The literal meaning of the name Bungingis is derived from the Cebuano word ngisi which means "to giggle".

Having a humanoid shape, it has large teeth which are always showing, and its upper lip covers its face when it is thrown back. Two long tusks protrude from the sides of its mouth. The giant's only eye is found in the middle of its forehead, but this is compensated for by its strong sense of hearing. It also displays unusual strength. In the Filipino tale "The Three Friends – The Monkey, The Dog and The Carabao," the giant is able to lift the carabao and throw it with such force that it lands knee-deep in the ground. However, despite its strength, the bungisngis is easily outwitted and quickly panics. In the tale of the Three Friends, Monkey's tricks led him to his death.
