= Clarita (film) =

- Directed by: Derick Cabrido
- Written by: Derick Cabrido; Cenon O. Palomares
- Produced by: Marizel Samson-Martinez; Omar P. Sortijas; Shiela Vidanes; Cris Villonco; Monique S.R. Villonco; Rolando Mario Villonco; Tere Siguion-Reyna Villonco
- Starring: Jodi Sta. Maria
- Cinematography: Mycko David
- Edited by: Mark Cyril Bautista
- Music by: Richard Gonzales
- Production companies: Black Sheep Productions; Purple Pig; Clever Minds
- Distributed by: ABS-CBN Film Productions
- Release date: June 12, 2019
- Running time: 85 minutes
- Country: Philippines
- Language: Filipino
- Box office: ₱70 million

Clarita is a 2019 Philippine supernatural horror film co-written and directed by Derick Cabrido. Starring Jodi Sta. Maria in a lead role, the film was based on the alleged possession of Clarita Villanueva.

A co-production of Black Sheep, Purple Pig, and Clever Minds, the film was distributed by ABS-CBN Film Productions and released theatrically on June 12, 2019.

== Cast ==
- Jodi Sta. Maria as Clarita Villanueva
  - Onioca Cuppilo as young Clarita
- Ricky Davao as Fr. Salvador
- Arron Villaflor as Fr. Benedicto
  - Sebastian Karl Bichler as young Benedicto
- Nonie Buencamino as Mayor Arsenio Lacson
- Alyssa Muhlach as Emelia
  - Kate Valdehueza as young Emelia
- Yayo Aguila as Demetria
- Tony Mabesa as Archbishop
- Romnick Sarmenta as Warden
- Che Ramos as Dra. Teresa
- Cherry Malvar as Dra. Perez
- Angeli Bayani as Bubbles
- Zandra Summer as Conching

== Production ==
Clarita is based on the story of the alleged possession of Clarita Villanueva in the 1950s. It was produced under Black Sheep Productions. Director Derick Cabrido first learned about the story while he was still working with the GMA television series Kapuso Mo, Jessica Soho through newspaper clippings. He took an interest in the story, which had garnered wide domestic and international attention at the time. He learned that various Catholic and other Christian groups came to resolve her case.

Cabrido leaned on director-writer Cenon Palomares to help adapt the story into a feature film. The production team largely had to rely on newspaper clippings since broadcast media in the Philippines in the 1950s were absent, with the country still recovering from the aftermath of World War II. They were also not able to interview any heir of Villanueva for potential material for the film. They also tried acquiring rights to use footage of the alleged possession from the British Broadcasting Corp. (BBC), but the BBC declined.

The production team approached the Catholic Bishops' Conference of the Philippines to talk to priests who perform exorcisms, as well as secured a transcript of Clarita's exorcism. However, the team decided against using the material due to it being deemed too "personal" and failure to secure consent from the Catholic Church, and the parties directly involved.

== Release ==
The film premiered in cinemas in the Philippines on June 12, 2019.

== Reception ==
The film grossed ₱70 million by June 27, 2019.
