= Eduardo Spohr =

Brazilian writer

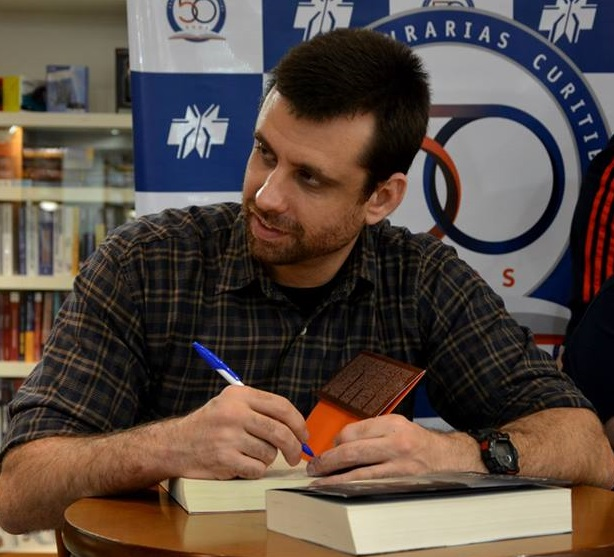
- Brazilian journalist, teacher, blogger, podcaster and fantasy and historical fiction writer
- Born: June 1976 (age 50); Copacabana, Rio de Janeiro, Rio de Janeiro state, Brazil
- Education: Pontifical Catholic University of Rio de Janeiro
- Occupation: Novelist
- Writing career
- Language: Portuguese
- Genre: Fantasy literature
- Notable work: A Batalha do Apocalipse
- Website: filosofianerd.com.br

Eduardo Spohr (born June 1976 in Copacabana, Rio de Janeiro) is a Brazilian journalist, teacher, blogger, podcaster and fantasy and historical fiction writer. He is the author of A Batalha do Apocalipse (The Battle of the Apocalypse), one of the best selling fiction books of all time in Brazil. Spohr is also widely known as a regular contributor to the popular Brazilian podcast Nerdcast, created by the entertainment website Jovem Nerd.

== Biography ==
Spohr is the son of an airline pilot and a flight attendant. He traveled to many countries during his childhood, which inspired his first fictional writings. Although he was not religious, his early contact with different cultures and the Cold War during his youth motivated him to write about the end of the world and religion in his book, A Batalha do Apocalipse, using aspects and the history of various civilizations in the book plot. Before formally starting his career as a writer, he studied Social Communication and initially dedicated himself to the Advertising industry before becoming a journalist. He worked the first years of the 2000s as a reporter, content analyst and editor for the iBest and Click21 portals respectively.

As a contributor to the Joven Nerd website, he published his first book at the Nerdstore, the site's virtual web store, under the label NerdBooks, selling more than four thousand copies. In June 2010, the Grupo Editorial Record published A Batalha do Apocalipse under the label Verus, selling, until December of the same year, fifty thousand copies. In 2011, Grupo released Filhos do Éden: Herdeiros de Atlântida, the first book of the Filhos do Éden series. In 2013, they released the second title of the series, Filhos do Éden: Anjos da Morte. In October 2015, they released Filhos do Éden: Paraíso Perdido, the third title of the series.

== Influences ==
Spohr cites Highlander, The Matrix, and Saint Seiya as influences. He was also inspired by writers Robert E. Howard, J. R. R. Tolkien, Neil Gaiman, Alan Moore, Frank Miller, Garth Ennis, Stephen King and H.P. Lovecraft.

== Criticism ==
Paulo Coelho described Spohr as a promising writer.

== Bibliography ==
- A Batalha do Apocalipse, Verus - 2010;
- Filhos do Éden: Herdeiros de Atlântida, Verus - 2011;
- Protocolo Bluehand: Alienígenas, NerdBooks - 2011;
- Filhos do Éden: Anjos da Morte, Verus - 2013;
- Filhos do Éden: Paraíso Perdido, Verus - 2015;
- Filhos do Éden: Universo Expandido, Verus - 2016;
- Roma Invicta: Santo Guerreiro, Verus - 2020;
