= A Batalha do Apocalipse =

2007 book by Eduardo Spohr

A Batalha do Apocalipse: Da Queda dos Anjos ao Crepúsculo do Mundo (The Battle of Apocalypse: From the Fall of Angels to the Twilight of the World)
- Author: Eduardo Spohr
- Language: Portuguese
- Genre: Fiction, Fantastic Literature, Angels
- Publisher: Verus
- Publication date: 2010
- Publication place: Brazil
- Pages: 586
- ISBN: 9788576860761

A Batalha do Apocalipse: Da Queda dos Anjos ao Crepúsculo do Mundo (The Battle of Apocalypse: From the Fall of Angels to the Twilight of the World) is a book written by Brazilian journalist Eduardo Spohr, published in 2007 by Jovem Nerd site, in 2009 by the imprint created by site and in 2010 by Verus. The plot revolves around character Ablon, a renegade angel doomed to wander the world of men for having rebelled against the archangel Michael. Other characters include Shamira "the Witch of Endor", which helps the historic journey to the apocalypse.

With a total of 586 pages, the book is divided into 3 parts titled The Holy Avenger, The Wrath of God and the Scourge of Fire.

In 2011, the book was released in the Netherlands, under the name Engelen van Apocalyps.

== Plot ==
In the distant past, the Celestial Paradise was the scene of a terrible uprising. A group of warrior angels, lovers of justice and freedom, challenged the tyranny of the powerful archangels, raising arms against their oppressors. Expelled, the renegades were forced into exile, and condemned to wander the world of men until the final judgement. Then comes the moment of Revelation, the day of the awakening of the Most High. Ablon, the sole survivor of the purge and leader of the renegades, is invited by Lucifer, to join his legions in the battle of Armageddon, the final struggle between Heaven and Hell.

== The Book ==
A constant journey between past, present and future the author begins the book introducing us to two important characters of his story, the archangels Michael and Uzziel. In that first moment he begins to present the personality of Michael and the context in which his story unfolds, God, soon after the creation on the seventh day - where the Bible refers to the time of your rest - enters a sleep deeper and you awake, supposedly the day of Judgement. Mankind then falls under the "guide" of the Archangels and their subordinates, the angels. There are five Archangels: Michael, the prince of the angels, heir to that title by being the firstborn. Uziel, commander of the armies of cherubim. Rafael, who was exiled after the fight of his brothers archangels. Gabriel, Master of Fire, rebelled against Archangel Michael. And, Lucifer, the morning star. As might be expected, Lucifer naturally craved the throne of his brother and it is around that nebulous plot that the course of the story takes place, as the rivalry between the two brothers is the main character of the book. The former general of the cherubim, Ablon, comes to us in Rio de Janeiro, in the near future, in the "hands of the Creator", i.e., standing in the hands of Christ the Redeemer. He meets his friend Orion, former King of Atlantis and current servant of Lucifer, who comes to propose a truce. Ablon's rival Apollyon is a deadly protagonist.

== Characters ==
- Archangel Michael: The Prince of angels, and the most radical of them. Later the leader of the archangels. He defeated the armies of Lucifer and drove them to Sheol.
- Ablon, the Renegade Angel or also called First General: The protagonist of the book. Over the years on earth, Ablon traveled through diverse corners of the world, always escaping from various dangers. At the present moment of the book, Ablon is in Brazil, in the city of Rio de Janeiro, and becomes the leader of a great gathering of angels.
- Lucifer, the Morning Star or the Son of the Dawn: After revolting against his brother Michael, today he has his own kingdom in the depths of Hell.
- Archangel Gabriel, The Master of the Fire or Messenger: He came too close to human beings, and therefore he adhered to their cause. Like Lucifer, he also revolted against Michael, but for less selfish motives.
- Archangel Raphael, the Cure of God: Being the kindest of the archangels, in the time of the deluge, he disappeared from paradise, causing everyone to believe that he had descended to the earth to live as a mortal.
- Archangel Uziel, the Golden Marshal: The youngest among the archangels. Commander of the order of the cherubim (the soldiers of God).
- Apollyon, the Destroying Angel: Lucifer's favourite warrior. When he fell with him, he became one of the nine Dukes of Hell.
- Shamira, the Witch of En-Dor: Having been trained early in the arts of magic and necromancy, Shamira met Ablon when he saved her from her persecutors in Babylon. Since then, both have been helping each other as they can each time they meet.
- Amael, the Lord of the Volcanoes: After helping the Archangel Michael to create the biblical flood, he repented and ended up following Lucifer and falling in Sheol. To this day he cries fervent tears for the atrocities he committed.
- Flower-of-the-East: Daughter of Chinese nobles. Her tongue was cut off and she was sold after a revolution. She is a great help to the Witch of En-Dor in saving the Ablon from death.

== Important Places ==
Heavenly Palace: the stronghold of the archangels in the Fifth Heaven, the most central and important point of the heavenly paradise.

Fortress of Zion: the greatest bastion of the forces of the archangel Michael out of the sky. Located in the ethereal plane, under the worldly city of Jerusalem.

Citadel of Fire: the First region of Heaven which is the meeting point of ishins. It was ruled by Amael, then by Aziel, and later became the headquarters of Gabriel and the new rebels.

Tsafon, Mount of the Congregation: the highest region of the Seventh Heaven where God was asleep.

Sheol: the dimension where the remains of Tehom and the gods of darkness were buried. It later served as home to Lucifer and his fallen angels, becoming known as Hell.

Castle of Light: the main stronghold of the cherubim, located in the Fourth Heaven.

== Summary ==
In Aurora the ages there has always been good and evil, which was destroyed by God along with their archangels created for the purpose of governing and protecting the earth. Long before the creation of man, God created the Archangels and soon the angels to serve and protect his creation. 7 days say they are very well explained in this book where each day was summed up in a million years, which led to the creation of the world we live in today. At the end of the sixth day, God was tired, and "fell asleep" at Mount Tsafon and let the angels and archangels to take care of all his creation, especially man, created in his image and likeness.

After the creation of men, still live on the seventh day, which God is asleep and we are governed by angels. In the glory days, the Archangel Michael, the first created by God, the eldest son, he felt diminished, and blinded by envy and jealousy by humans, ordered mass destruction, but was barred by the legion of warriors, 18 renegade angels, led by Ablon, hero of this book.

These angels were sentenced to 18 Haled (earth) and trapped in their avatars and forever pursued by warriors Miguel, until they are killed because they were considered traitors of heaven and condemned to live humans stuck together that both defended until the end of time, the end of the seventh day, the Day of Reckoning where God and awaken your universe exilaria those who were against their will.

Lucifer also made a revolution, claiming to defend human but it was just jealousy for his brother what motivated him, making him take Sheol (hell) and third heaven, where there was created the refuge of evil, for which all unjust and malicious would be sent. And so begins the era of a hero, the protagonist of this book that involves romance, mystery, action, fiction and mysteries never before revealed. Ablon goes through various adventures, hovering past and present in which is supported by the witch of Endor (Shamira) which saved him from the hands of the tyrant king of Babylon, destroyed himself. Remembering here that even before Lucifer was exiled renegade angels existed, which is different from Lucifer, the fallen angel.

After various adventures experienced by Ablon, finally comes the time of the Day of Reckoning, the famous Battle of Armageddon which will decide the future of humanity, the planet and all the beings that inhabit it. It is the legendary battle between the defender of humanity and the Archangel Michael, overcome by jealousy and greed, which led to him being the most tyrannical of all the universe, trying to match up to God who in his sick mind believed was his destiny.

Ablon, when he discovers that Ishatar (his partner renegade) was murdered by Black Angel, gets mad and blind with rage, but she was dead on behalf of a secret that would change the entire fate of the universe, a secret which Ablon only discover at the last breath of his life. The book of Revelation Battle involves mysteries never revealed. It's like reading the Apocalypse, but in an innovative language and full of answers.

== Reviews ==
"There is nothing in known Portuguese literature that resembles the Battle of the Apocalypse." - José Louzeiro, writer and screenwriter
