= Derick Cabrido =

- Born: Roderick Cabrido; Tondo, Manila
- Occupations: Documentary producer and filmmaker
- Years active: 2011–present
- Known for: Bronze World Medal at the 2009 New York Television Festival, Silver Screen Award at the 2010 New York International Independent Film and Video Festival, 2012 Silver World Medal Award at the New York Festivals
- Notable work: Engkantong Laog sa Mahabang Dapithapon, Cuchera, Nuwebe

Roderick "Derick" Cabrido is a Filipino documentary producer and filmmaker.

== Career ==
He was awarded with the Bronze World Medal at the 2009 New York Television Festival, for the documentary Pinays for Export, Silver Screen Award at the 2010 New York International Independent Film and Video Festival for the documentary Tasaday, he also won the 2012 Silver World Medal Award at the New York Festivals for his documentary Yaman sa Basura which is also a finalist for the 2011 UNICEF Asia-Pacific Child Rights Awards.

He is also the producer and cinematographer of the film, Antipo which premiered at the 2010 Cannes Film Festival Short Film Corner and produced the film Cuchera, a finalist at the 2011 Cinemalaya Independent Film Festival which premiered at the 2011 Toronto International Film Festival under Discovery Section. Main Competition, 2011 Stockholm International Film Festival, Official Selection, 2011 Belgrade International Film Festival and Official Selection, 2011 Cleveland Film Festival. He also produced Nuwebe (Termitaria), a finalist at the 2013 Cinemalaya Independent Film Festival which won awards from the Queens World Film Festival and Harlem International Film Festival in New York City, Lume International Film Festival in Brazil, Festival Internacional de Cine Puebla in Mexico and Best Director at the 2015 ASEAN International Film Festival and Awards in Sarawak, Malaysia.

He was also one of the executive producers of the Front Row, a documentary program which aired every Monday at GMA Network in the Philippines from 2011 to 2021.

=== Films ===
==== Engkantong Laog sa Mahabang Dapithapon (Short film) ====
Engkantong Laog sa Mahabang Dapithapon, a short film about organ selling in the Philippines, Official Selection at the 2013 Cannes Film Festival Short Film Corner.

==== Cuchera ====
Cuchera was Cabrido's first feature film as a producer. It deals with the grim fate of low-rent drug mules and their recruiters. The film was a Finalist at the 7th Cinemalaya Independent Film Festival and it had its International Premiere at the Discovery Section of the 2011 Toronto International Film Festival (TIFF). It was also screened at the Stockholm International Film Festival (Main Competition), Cleveland International Film Festival, Belgrade International Film Festival and Fribourg International Film Festival.

TIFF film programmer Steve Gravestock described it as "One of the most shocking debuts in recent Filipino cinema... Cuchera may turn out to be a watershed in Filipino film history — directly linking the melodramatic ferocity of the politically charged works of veteran directors like Joel Lamangan and Carlos Siguion-Reyna with the more intimate style of what some have dubbed the Filipino New Wave."

==== Nuwebe ====
Nuwebe was Cabrido's follow up to the film Cuchera as a producer. It tells the story of one of the youngest mothers in Philippine history. It initially received mixed reviews from local critics but went on to have a successful run in international film festivals. It was also a finalist at the 2013 Cinemalaya Philippine Independent Film Festival. It has been screened at more than twenty international film festivals. It has won several international awards and nominations from the Queens World Film Festival (Best Director) and Harlem International Film Festival (Best Actress) in New York City, Lume International Film Festival (Special Mention) in Brazil and the Festival Internacional de Cine Puebla (Special Mention) in Mexico.

=== Television ===
In 2025, Cabrido directed Bad Genius the Philippine television adaptation of the 2017 film of the same name for Viva One.

== Accolades ==
Cabrido's awards include: Bronze World Medal at the 2009 New York Television Festival, for the documentary "Pinays for Export", Silver Screen Award at the 2010 New York International Independent Film and Video Festival for the documentary "Tasaday", 2012 Silver World Medal Award at the New York Festivals for his documentary "Yaman sa Basura" which is also a finalist for the 2011 UNICEF Asia-Pacific Child Rights Awards. Special Jury Prize for the Orient Express Category at Fantasporto International Film Festival; It also grabbed Special Jury Award, Best Screenplay for the Fantastic Cinema Festival, Arkansas, Texas and also the Emerging Director Award from the same festival; Best Story Award at the 15th Gawad Tanglaw Awards and Emerging Filmmaker Award at Film Society of Little Rock, Arkansas, Texas.
