= Jodi Sta. Maria =

Filipino actress (born 1982)

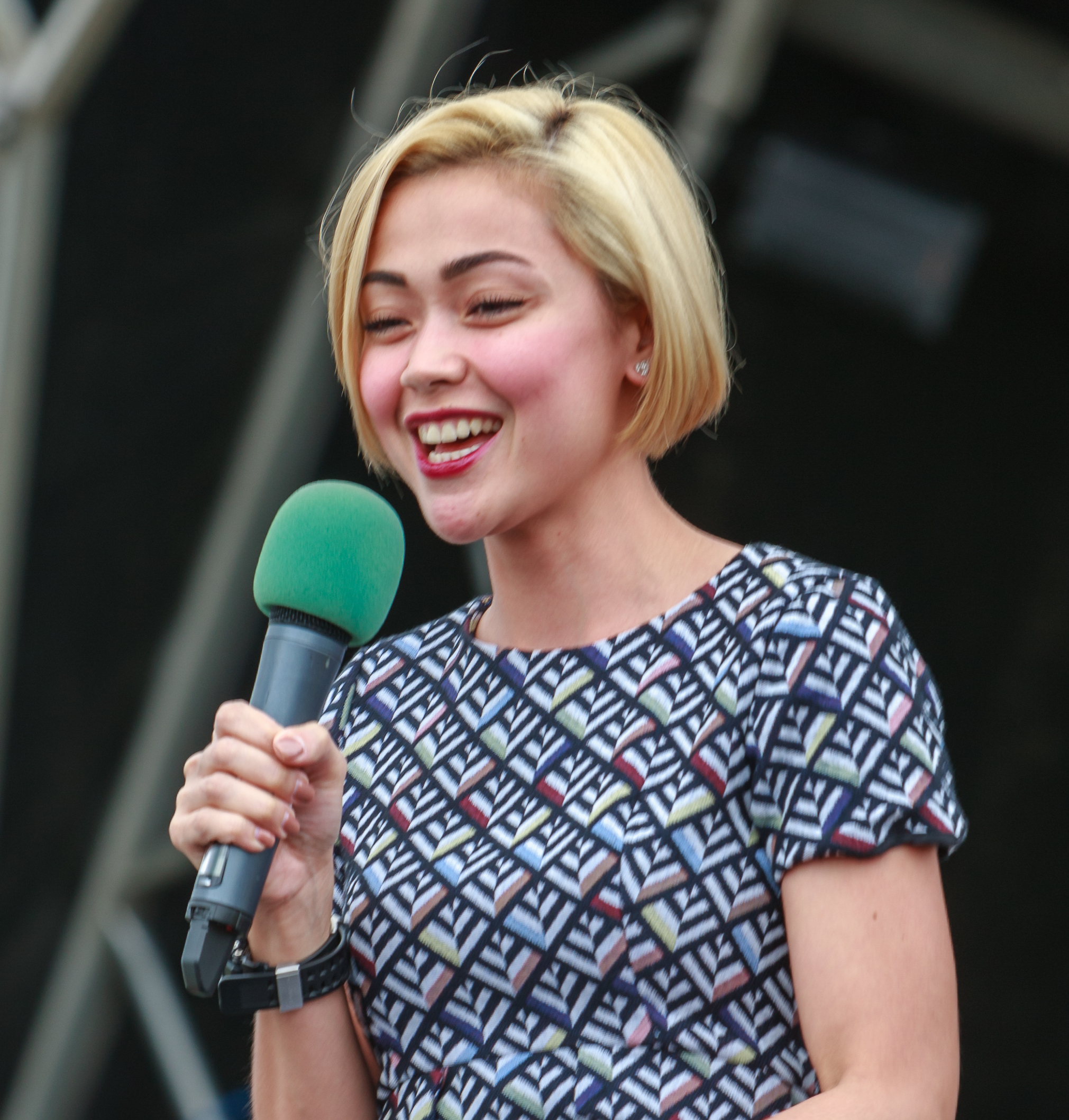
- Sta. Maria in 2016
- Born: Jodi Chrissie Africano Sta. Maria; June 16, 1982 (age 44); Santa Rosa, Laguna, Philippines
- Occupation: Actress
- Years active: 1998–present
- Agents: Star Magic (1998–2018); B617 (2018–present)
- Spouse: Panfilo P. Lacson Jr. (m. 2005; ann. 2024)
- Children: 1

Jodi Chrissie Africano Sta. Maria (born June 16, 1982) is a Filipino actress. She is notable for her versatility in comedy, horror, and drama across independent film, blockbusters, and television. She has been nominated for a FAMAS Award and two Gawad Urian Awards. In 2014, she won the Favorite Foreign Actress award at the Vietnam Green Star Awards. In 2016, she was nominated for Best Actress at the 44th International Emmy Awards for her role as Amor Powers on Pangako sa 'Yo (2015). In 2022, Sta. Maria won Best Drama Actress at the Golden Laurel Batangas Province Media Awards and Best Actress in a Leading Role at the Asian Academy Creative Awards for her role on The Broken Marriage Vow (2022).

== Personal life ==
Jodi Chrissie Africano Sta. Maria is the youngest child in her family. She and her brother were raised by their single mother, Mercedita. She attended the Philippine Pasay Chung Hua Academy and was an honor student. In school, Sta. Maria was active in her school's extra-curricular activities, particularly the volleyball varsity team and the debating team.

Sta. Maria was married to Panfilo "Pampi" Lacson Jr., the son of Senator Panfilo Lacson, from whom she is now separated. The two met during a taping of Tabing Ilog and married on Easter Sunday 2005 in Las Vegas. The two separated in March 2011 and thereafter Sta. Maria filed a petition for the declaration of nullity of marriage with the Regional Trial Court on grounds of psychological incapacity. The court declared their marriage "null and void" in 2014 but that decision was junked by the Court of Appeals in 2016 and affirmed in 2017. Their marriage was annulled in 2024.

Sta. Maria and Lacson have a son born in 2005 named Panfilo "Thirdy" Lacson III. In a 2016 interview, Sta. Maria revealed that she was greatly affected by her separation from Lacson, which resulted in alcoholism and drug use. She quit smoking, alcohol, and drugs after the intervention of actress Coney Reyes and became a Born again Christian. The success of her TV series Be Careful with My Heart in 2012 also helped her recover from her addictions.

Sta. Maria attended De La Salle University-Dasmariñas and studied Medical Biology as her prerequisite to studying medicine. She left college after a year due to the sudden success of her series Be Careful With My Heart, which was extended from its intended run of 3 months to 2 and 1/2 years. She completed her degree in psychology at Southville International School and Colleges in 2020. She was a Dean's Lister during her final semester in 2019.

She became PAWS ambassador in March 2025.

== Career ==
A talent scout approached Sta. Maria and her friends to audition for commercials while at a fast-food chain. After numerous auditions and no offers, they gave up. The talent scout approached Sta. María once again and encouraged her to audition for Star Magic. At 15, she was the youngest in their batch.

After starring and appearing in teen-oriented shows and movies such as Gimik, Flames, and Jologs, Sta. Maria landed a role in Tabing Ilog as the sassy tomboyish Georgina. The show was successful and ran for almost five years. She also became a host of Star Circle Quest alongside Luis Manzano.

She was cast in the original version of Pangako Sa 'Yo (2000) as Lia Buenavista, and starred in the 2015 remake as Amor Powers.

After playing teen roles, she played villainous characters in primetime shows such as Walang Kapalit and Kampanerang Kuba. She transitioned to star in numerous independent films, which have been screened internationally. She has since received 3 Gawad Urian Award nominations.

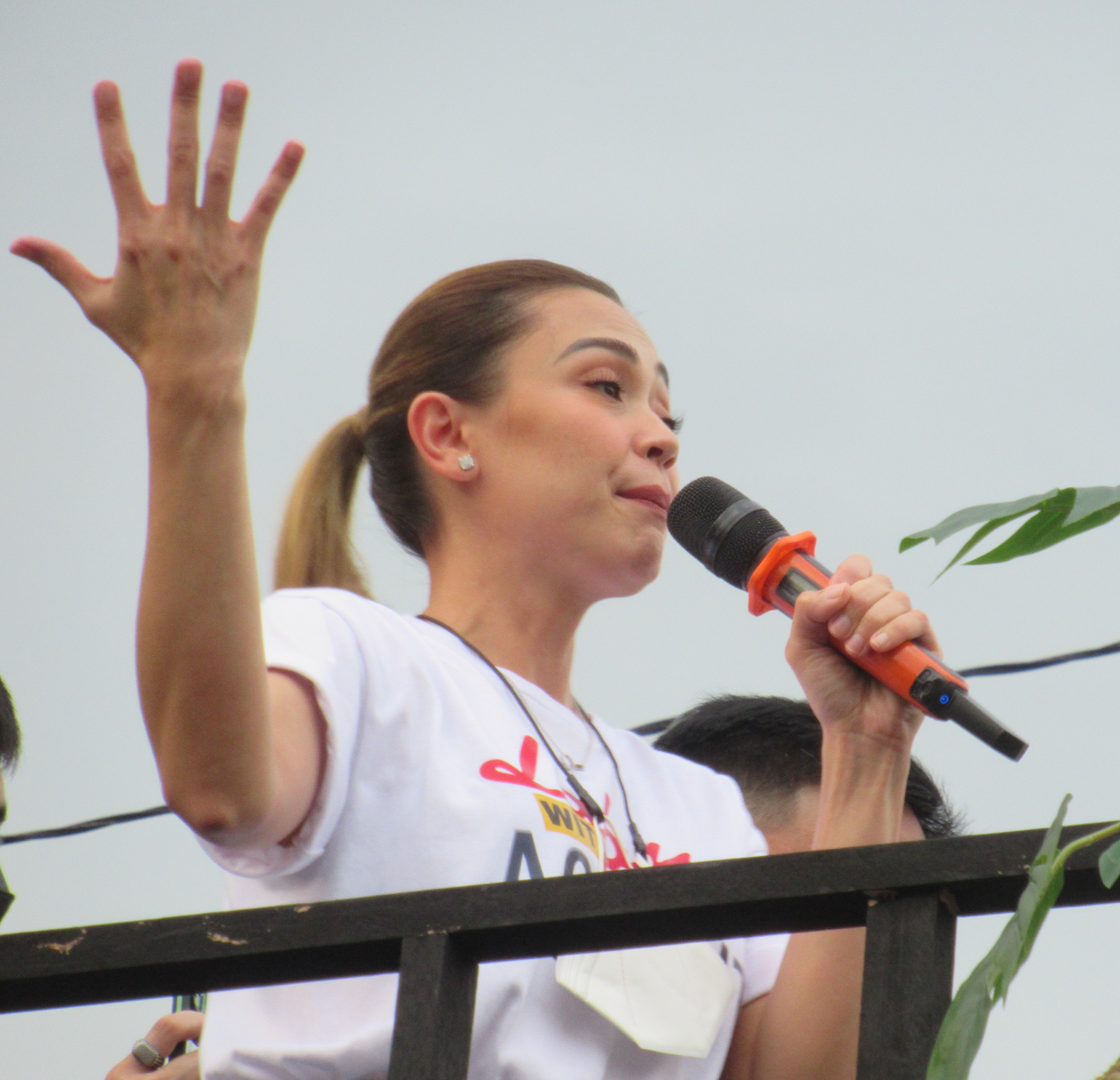
Sta. Maria at the 2022 Metro Manila Film Festival Parade of Stars promoting Labyu with an Accent

In 2010, she starred in Noah alongside Piolo Pascual, who has called her a 'thinking actress'. In 2011, she played Sophia in the critically acclaimed 100 Days to Heaven. In 2012, Sta. Maria had a special participation as in the daytime drama series Mundo Man ay Magunaw until she top-billed the sleeper hit Be Careful with My Heart as Maya dela Rosa along with Richard Yap who played her love interest, Richard Lim. The show became a success, spawning albums, worldwide tours, and concerts.

Her portrayal as Amor Powers in the 2015 remake of Pangako Sa ‘Yo earned her an International Emmy Award for Best Actress nomination. Since then, she has starred in the daytime drama Sana Dalawa ang Puso and the primetime series, Sino ang May Sala?

In 2020, she starred in the hit show Ang sa Iyo ay Akin. Her portrayal of Marissa Pineda won her numerous awards.

In 2022, she starred in the Philippine adaptation of Doctor Foster, The Broken Marriage Vow. The series was constantly trending on social media for her performance. She won the prestigious Asian Academy Creative Award for Best Actress.

On September 8, 2022, ABS-CBN announced that Sta. Maria star in the Metro Manila Film Festival entry Labyu with an Accent. She has vocalized that her manager told her she was going to do the movie only weeks before shooting - without her approval.

From 2024 to 2025, she portrayed the main protagonist role as Jasmin Flores / Lavender Fields in Lavender Fields.

On January 7, 2025, Sta. Maria announced that she will be on hiatus on acting in order to pursue her master's degree in clinical psychology.

In 2026, she starred in a variety show Kumusta with Janella Salvador, Francine Diaz, Arci Muñoz, Ji Chang-wook, and Michelin-recognized Filipino chef JP Anglo.

== Filmography ==
=== Film ===
Year	Title	Role	Notes	Source
1999	Oo Na, Mahal Na Kung Mahal	Patrick's girl	Cameo	
2000	Anak	Bernadette		
2001	Sugatang Puso	Kyla		
2001	Bagong Buwan	Dolor		
2002	Jologs	Faith		
2003	Noon at Ngayon: Pagsasamang Kay Ganda	Guia		
2006	You Are The One	Charry Malasmas		
2007	Maling Akala	Teta		
2008	Sisa	Sisa		
2010	Chassis			
2010	Noy	Herself	Cameo	
2010	Cinco	Elisa	Segment: "Second: Paa"	
2010	Third World Happy	Aylinn		
2010	My Amnesia Girl	Flight Attendant		
2012	Migrante			
2013	Aparisyon	Lourdes		
2014	Maria Leonora Teresa	Stella De Castro		
2015	All You Need Is Pag-Ibig	Mel		
2016	The Achy Breaky Hearts	Chinggay Villanueva		
2017	Dear Other Self	Rebecca "Becky" Macadaeg		
2019	Second Coming	Bea		
2019	Man and Wife	Luisa		
2019	Clarita	Clarita Villanueva		
2022	Labyu with an Accent	Trisha	Main role	
2025	Untold	Vivian Vera		
2026	Midnight Girls	Maria Victoria "Vicky" Dela Cruz Ramos	Main role	
2026	Ganito, Ganyan, Ganoon		Main role	
2026	Edjop	Joyette Jopson	Main role	
2026	2nd Miracle in Cell No. 7	Angela	Main role	

=== Television ===
Year	Title	Role	Notes	Source
1998	Wansapanataym: Slow Down, Angels Crossing			
1999	Gimik	Gretchen	Extended Role	
1999	Tabing Ilog	Georgina ”George” Fuentabella	Main Role	
2000	Marinella	Young Guada	Special participation	
2000–02	Pangako Sa 'Yo	Lia Buenavista	Support Role	
2001	Wansapanataym: Iskul Brats	Sosy Suzy		
2003	Darating ang Umaga	Nicole del Fuego	Support Role	
2003	Wansapanataym: Kotso Biskotso			
2005	Kampanerang Kuba	Veronica Saavedra de Vera / Agatha	Support Role / Antagonist	
2005	Maalaala Mo Kaya	Donna Lee	Episode: "Mariposang Dagat"	
2006	Maalaala Mo Kaya	Mila	Episode: "Piso"	
2006	Komiks Presents: Valentina	Valentina	Protagonist / Anti-Hero	
2007	Walang Kapalit	Cynthia Bermudez-Borromeo	Support Role / Antagonist	
2008	Ligaw na Bulaklak	Marilyn Alegro	Special Participation	
2008	Maalaala Mo Kaya	Inday	Episode: "Basilica Minore del Sto. Niño de Cebu"	
2008	Palos	Carmela Canavarro	Support Role / Antagonist	
2008	Maalaala Mo Kaya	Anna	Episode: "Bracelet"; Credited as "Jodi Sta. Maria-Lacson"	
2008	Sineserye Presents: The Susan Roces Cinema Collection: Patayin sa Sindak si Barbara	Ruth Martinez	Main Role / Antagonist	
2009	Midnight DJ	Dr. Carissa Leano	Episode: Scary Retoke	
2009	Maalaala Mo Kaya	Marilyn	Episode: "Medal of Valor"	
2009	Tayong Dalawa	Angela Dominguez	Recurred Role	
2009	Your Song: Gaano Kita Kamahal	Carmela	Support Role / Anti-Hero	
2009	Maalaala Mo Kaya	Aimee	Episode: "Reseta"	
2010	Maalaala Mo Kaya	Dolly	Episode: "Saranggola"	
2010	Tanging Yaman	Marina Dimaguiba	Support Role	
2010	Maalaala Mo Kaya	Kris Aquino	Episode: "Makinilya"	
2010–11	Noah	Ruth de Leon-Perez	Support Role / Protagonist	
2011	Maalaala Mo Kaya	Debbie	Episode: "Kwintas"	
2011	100 Days to Heaven	Sophia Delgado / Tricia Manalastas	Main Role / Protagonist	
2012	Mundo Man ay Magunaw	Young Olivia San Juan-La Peña	Special Participation / Protagonist	
2012	Maalaala Mo Kaya	Mila	Episode: "Kamao"	
2012–14	Be Careful with My Heart	Maya dela Rosa-Lim	Main Role / Protagonist	
2015–16	Pangako Sa 'Yo	Amor De Jesus-Powers/ Amor De Jesus-Buenavista	Main Role / Protagonist	
2017	Maalaala Mo Kaya	Marie	Episode: "Gatas"	
2018	Sana Dalawa ang Puso	Elisabeth "Lisa" Laureano-Tabayoyong / Elisabeth "Lisa" Tan-Tabayoyong and Ramona "Mona" Bulalayao-Co / Ramona "Mona" Tan-Co	Main Role (Dual Role)	
2019	Sino ang May Sala?	Filipina "Fina" Capuyan-Baniaga	Main Role / Protagonist	
2020	My Single Lady	Chona San Miguel	Main Role	
2020–2021	Ang sa Iyo ay Akin	Marissa Pineda	Main Role / Anti-hero	
2022	The Broken Marriage Vow	Dra. Jill Victorino	Main Role / Protagonist	
2023	Unbreak My Heart	Rosanna Marie "Rose" Jacinto-Zhang	Main Role / Protagonist	
2024–2025	Lavender Fields	Lavender Fields / Jasmine Flores	Main Role / Protagonist	
2026	Kumusta	Herself		

== Awards and nominations ==
Year	Work	Award	Category	Result	Source
2004	Star Circle Quest	PMPC Star Awards for Television	Best Talent Search Program Host (with Luis Manzano)	Won	
2004	—N/a	PMPC Star Awards for Television	Face of the Night	Won	
2005	Star Circle Quest	PMPC Star Awards for Television	Best Talent Search Program Host (with Luis Manzano)	Won	
2007	You Are the One	PMPC Star Awards for Movies	Movie Supporting Actress of the Year	Nominated	
2007	Walang Kapalit	PMPC Star Awards for Television	Best Drama Actress	Nominated	
2008	Maling Akala	Golden Screen Awards for Movies	Best Performance by an Actress in a Lead Role (Drama)	Nominated	
2008	Sisa	Cinemanila International Film Festival	Digital Lokal-Best Actress	Won	
2009	Sisa	PMPC Star Awards for Movies	Movie Actress of the Year	Nominated	
2009	Sisa	Golden Screen Awards	Best Performance by an Actress in a Lead Role (Drama)	Nominated	
2010	Third World Happy	Cinema One Originals Film Festival	Best Supporting Actress	Won	
2011	Chassis	9th Gawad Tanglaw Awards	Best Actress	Won	
2011	Chassis	35th Gawad Urian Awards	Best Actress	Nominated	
2012	100 Days to Heaven	USTv Student's Choice Awards	Best Supporting Actress in a Daily Local Soap Opera	Won	
2013	Migrante	PMPC Star Awards for Movies	Movie Actress of the Year	Nominated	
2013	Migrante	Golden Screen Awards	Best Performance by an Actress in a Leading Role (Drama)	Nominated	
2013	Migrante	FAMAS Awards	Best Actress	Nominated	
2013	Aparisyon	37th Gawad Urian Awards	Best Actress	Nominated	
2013	Be Careful With My Heart	PMPC Star Awards for Television	Best Drama Actress	Nominated	
2013	Be Careful With My Heart	GMMSF Box-Office Entertainment Awards	Most Popular Loveteam on Television (with Richard Yap)	Won	
2013	Be Careful With My Heart	Anak Makabata Award	Iconic Seal	Won	
2014	Be Careful With My Heart	Paragala Central Luzon Media Awards	Best Television Actress	Won	
2014	Be Careful With My Heart	GMMSF Box-Office Entertainment Awards	Most Popular Loveteam on Television (with Richard Yap)	Won	
2014	Be Careful With My Heart	Golden Screen TV Awards	Outstanding Performance by an Actress in a Drama Series	Nominated	
2014	Be Careful With My Heart	ASAP Pop Viewers' Choice Awards	Pop Kapamilya TV Character	Won	
2014	Be Careful With My Heart	Face of The Year Awards	Best Foreign Actress	Won	
2015	All You Need Is Pag-Ibig	Metro Manila Film Festival	Best Actress	Nominated	
2015	Pangako Sa 'Yo	TV series Craze Awards	Leading Lady of The Year	Won	
2015	Pangako Sa 'Yo	GIC Innovation Awards for Television	Most Innovative Actress	Won	
2015	Pangako Sa 'Yo	PMPC Star Awards for Television	Best Drama Actress	Nominated	
2016	Pangako Sa 'Yo	Anak Makabata Award	Iconic Seal	Won	
2016	Pangako Sa 'Yo	14th Gawad Tanglaw Awards	Best Performance by an Actress (TV Series)	Won	
2016	Pangako Sa 'Yo	24th KBP Golden Dove Awards	Best TV Actress in a Drama Program	Won	
2016	Pangako Sa 'Yo	International Emmy Awards	International Emmy Award for Best Actress	Nominated	
2017	Maalaala Mo Kaya: Baby for Sale	31st PMPC Star Awards for Television	Best Single Performance by an Actress	Nominated	
2018	Dear Other Self	34th PMPC Star Awards for Movies	Movie Actress of the Year	Nominated	
2018	Sana Dalawa ang Puso	32nd PMPC Star Awards for Television	Best Drama Actress	Nominated	
2019	Sino ang Maysala?	33rd PMPC Star Awards for Television	Best Drama Actress	Nominated	
2022	The Broken Marriage Vow	Asian Academy Creative Awards	Best Actress in a Leading Role	Won	
