= Kapuso Mo, Jessica Soho =

Philippine television news magazine show

- Title card since 2024
- Also known as: One at Heart, Jessica Soho; KMJS
- Tagalog: Kapuso Mo, Jessica Soho
- Literally: Your Heartmate, Jessica Soho
- Genre: News magazine
- Presented by: Jessica Soho
- Country of origin: Philippines
- Original language: Tagalog

Production
- Camera setup: Multiple-camera setup
- Running time: 60–90 minutes
- Production company: GMA Public Affairs

Original release
- Network: GMA Network
- Release: November 7, 2004 – present

Related
- KMJS' Gabi ng Lagim; KMJS' Gabi ng Lagim: The Movie

Kapuso Mo, Jessica Soho (transl. your heartmate, Jessica Soho, abbreviated as KMJS) is a Philippine television news magazine show broadcast by GMA Network. Hosted by Jessica Soho, it premiered on November 7, 2004 on the network's Sunday evening line up. It is the longest running news magazine show in the Philippines.

The show is streaming online on Facebook and YouTube.

== Premise ==
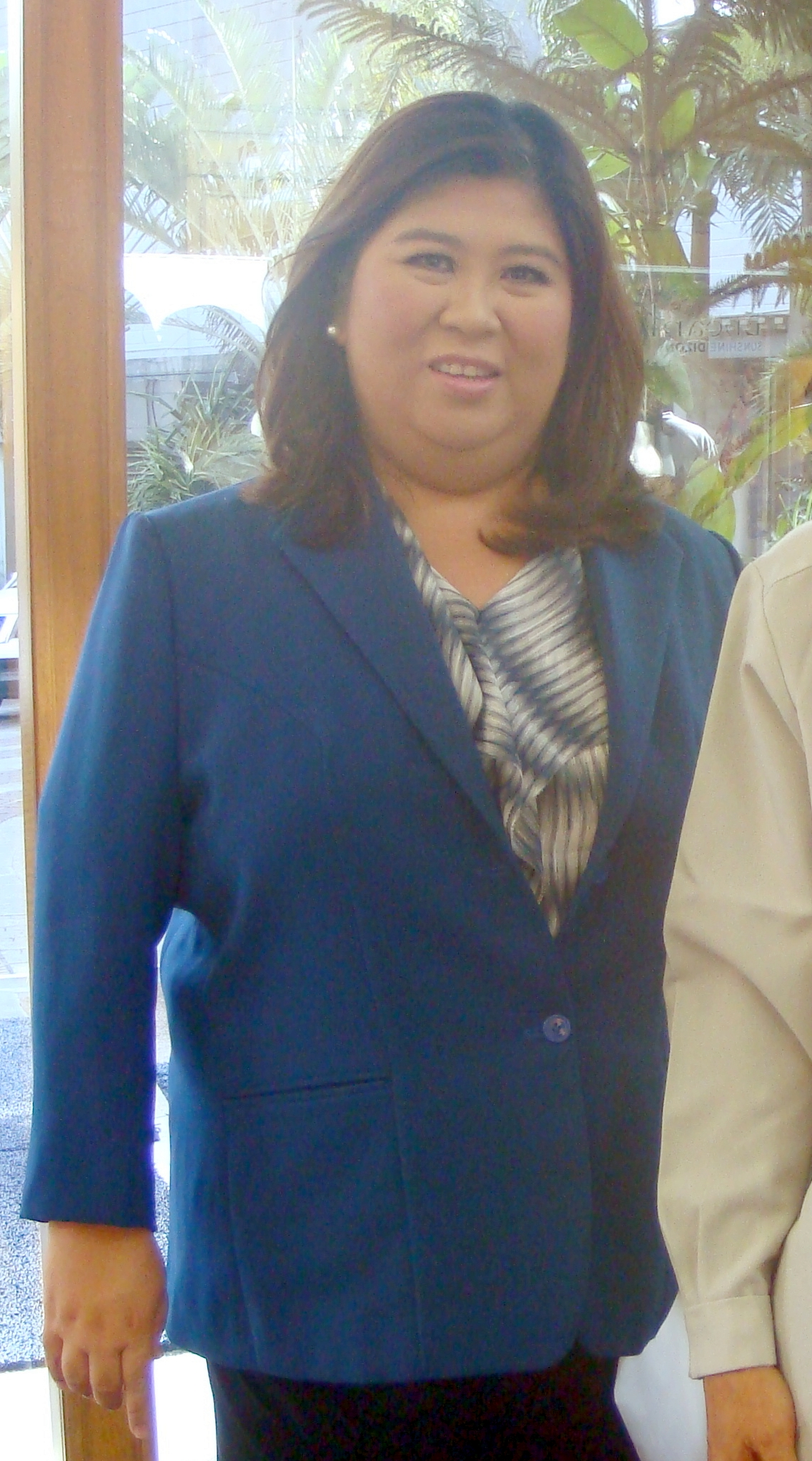
Jessica Soho serves as a host.

The show features stories on events, pop culture, foods, celebrities, health and trends, as well as urban legends, ghost stories and supposed paranormal activities.

== Accolades ==
Accolades received by Kapuso Mo, Jessica Soho
Year	Award	Category	Recipient	Result	Ref.
2006	Anak TV Seal Awards	Anak TV Seal Awardee	Kapuso Mo, Jessica Soho	Included	
2006	20th PMPC Star Awards for Television	Best Magazine Show	Kapuso Mo, Jessica Soho	Nominated	
2006	20th PMPC Star Awards for Television	Best Magazine Show Host	Jessica Soho	Nominated	
2007	Catholic Mass Media Awards	Best News Magazine	Kapuso Mo, Jessica Soho	Won	
2007	21st PMPC Star Awards for Television	Best Magazine Show	Kapuso Mo, Jessica Soho	Nominated	
2007	21st PMPC Star Awards for Television	Best Magazine Show Host	Jessica Soho	Nominated	
2007	UPLB Gandingan Awards	Best Magazine Show Host	Jessica Soho	Won	
2008	Anak TV Seal Awards	Anak TV Seal Awardee	Kapuso Mo, Jessica Soho	Included	
2008	22nd PMPC Star Awards for Television	Best Magazine Show	Kapuso Mo, Jessica Soho	Nominated	
2008	22nd PMPC Star Awards for Television	Best Magazine Show Host	Jessica Soho	Nominated	
2008	UPLB Gandingan Awards	Best Magazine Program Host	Jessica Soho	Won	
2008	USTV Students' Choice Awards	Students' Choice of Magazine Program	Kapuso Mo, Jessica Soho	Won	
2009	Anak TV Awards	Most Well-Liked TV Program	Kapuso Mo, Jessica Soho	Included	
2009	1st MTRCB TV Awards	Best Female Host	Jessica Soho	Won	
2009	23rd PMPC Star Awards for Television	Best Magazine Show	Kapuso Mo, Jessica Soho	Won	
2009	23rd PMPC Star Awards for Television	Best Magazine Show Host	Jessica Soho	Won	
2009	UPLB Gandingan Awards	Most Development-Oriented Magazine Program	Kapuso Mo, Jessica Soho	Won	
2009	UPLB Gandingan Awards	Best Magazine Program Host	Jessica Soho	Won	
2009	USTV Students' Choice Awards	Students' Choice of Magazine Program	Kapuso Mo, Jessica Soho	Won	
2010	Anak TV Seal Awards	Anak TV Seal Awardee	Kapuso Mo, Jessica Soho	Included	
2010	24th PMPC Star Awards for Television	Best Magazine Show	Kapuso Mo, Jessica Soho	Won	
2010	24th PMPC Star Awards for Television	Best Magazine Show Host	Jessica Soho	Won	
2010	UPLB Gandingan Awards	Best Magazine Program	Kapuso Mo, Jessica Soho	Won	
2010	UPLB Gandingan Awards	Best Magazine Program Host	Jessica Soho	Won	
2010	USTV Students' Choice Awards	Students' Choice of Magazine Program	Kapuso Mo, Jessica Soho	Won	
2011	Anak TV Seal Awards	Top 10 Most Favorite TV Programs	Kapuso Mo, Jessica Soho	Included	
2011	Golden Screen TV Awards	Outstanding Magazine Program	Kapuso Mo, Jessica Soho	Won	
2011	Golden Screen TV Awards	Outstanding Magazine Program Host	Jessica Soho	Won	
2011	PMAP Makatao Awards for Media Excellence	Best TV Public Affairs Program Host	Jessica Soho	Won	
2011	25th PMPC Star Awards for Television	Best Magazine Show	Kapuso Mo, Jessica Soho	Nominated	
2011	25th PMPC Star Awards for Television	Best Magazine Show Host	Jessica Soho	Nominated	
2011	UPLB Gandingan Awards	Best Magazine Program	Kapuso Mo, Jessica Soho	Won	
2011	UPLB Gandingan Awards	Best Magazine Program Host	Jessica Soho	Won	
2011	USTV Students' Choice Awards	Students' Choice of Magazine Program	Kapuso Mo, Jessica Soho	Won	
2012	Anak TV Seal Awards	Anak TV Seal Awardee	Kapuso Mo, Jessica Soho	Included	
2012	Anak TV Seal Awards	Anak TV Seal Winning Program	Kapuso Mo, Jessica Soho	Included	
2012	PMAP Makatao Awards for Media Excellence	Best TV Public Affairs Program	Kapuso Mo, Jessica Soho	Won	
2012	PMAP Makatao Awards for Media Excellence	Best TV Public Affairs Program Host	Jessica Soho	Won	
2012	26th PMPC Star Awards for Television	Best Magazine Show	Kapuso Mo, Jessica Soho	Won	
2012	26th PMPC Star Awards for Television	Best Magazine Show Host	Jessica Soho	Won	
2012	UPLB Gandingan Awards	Best Magazine Program	Kapuso Mo, Jessica Soho	Won	
2012	UPLB Gandingan Awards	Best Magazine Program Host	Jessica Soho	Won	
2012	USTV Students' Choice Awards	Students' Choice of Magazine Program	Kapuso Mo, Jessica Soho	Won	
2013	Anak TV Seal Awards	Anak TV Seal Awardee	Kapuso Mo, Jessica Soho	Included	
2013	Anak TV Seal Awards	Most Well-Liked TV Program	Kapuso Mo, Jessica Soho	Included	
2013	Golden Screen TV Awards	Outstanding Magazine Program	Kapuso Mo, Jessica Soho	Nominated	
2013	Golden Screen TV Awards	Outstanding Magazine Program Host	Jessica Soho	Nominated	
2013	35th Catholic Mass Media Awards	Best News Magazine	Kapuso Mo, Jessica Soho	Won	
2013	Kagitingan Awards for Television	10 Pinakamagiting na Programang Pantelebisyon	Kapuso Mo, Jessica Soho	Included	
2013	NwSSU Students' Choice Awards for Radio and Television	Best Magazine Program	Kapuso Mo, Jessica Soho	Won	
2013	NwSSU Students' Choice Awards for Radio and Television	Best Magazine Program Host	Jessica Soho	Won	
2013	PMAP Makatao Awards for Media Excellence	Best TV Public Affairs Program	Kapuso Mo, Jessica Soho	Won	
2013	PMAP Makatao Awards for Media Excellence	Best TV Public Affairs Program Host	Jessica Soho	Won	
2013	27th PMPC Star Awards for Television	Best Magazine Show	Kapuso Mo, Jessica Soho	Nominated	
2013	27th PMPC Star Awards for Television	Best Magazine Show Host	Jessica Soho	Won	
2013	USTV Students' Choice Awards	Students' Choice of Magazine Program	Kapuso Mo, Jessica Soho	Won	
2014	Anak TV Seal Awards	Anak TV Seal Awardee	Kapuso Mo, Jessica Soho	Included	
2014	Golden Screen TV Awards	Outstanding Magazine Program	Kapuso Mo, Jessica Soho	Won	
2014	Golden Screen TV Awards	Outstanding Magazine Program Host	Jessica Soho	Won	
2014	Kagitingan Awards for Television	10 Pinakamagiting na Programang Pantelebisyon	Kapuso Mo, Jessica Soho	Included	
2014	New York Festivals	"Photographs of Typhoon Pablo"	Best News Reporter/Correspondent	Finalist	
2014	1st Paragala Central Luzon Media Awards	Best Magazine Show	Kapuso Mo, Jessica Soho	Won	
2014	1st Paragala Central Luzon Media Awards	Best Magazine Show Host	Jessica Soho	Won	
2014	PMAP Makatao Awards for Media Excellence	Best TV Public Affairs Program	Kapuso Mo, Jessica Soho	Won	
2014	PMAP Makatao Awards for Media Excellence	Best TV Public Affairs Program Host	Jessica Soho	Won	
2014	28th PMPC Star Awards for Television	Best Magazine Show	Kapuso Mo, Jessica Soho	Nominated	
2014	28th PMPC Star Awards for Television	Best Magazine Show Host	Jessica Soho	Nominated	
2014	UPLB Gandingan Awards	Best Magazine Program	Kapuso Mo, Jessica Soho	Won	
2014	UPLB Gandingan Awards	Best Magazine Program Host	Jessica Soho	Won	
2014	USTV Students' Choice Awards	Students' Choice of Magazine Program	Kapuso Mo, Jessica Soho	Won	
2014	USTV Students' Choice Awards	Students' Choice of Magazine Program Host	Jessica Soho	Won	
2015	Anak TV Seal Awards	Top Household Favorite Program	Kapuso Mo, Jessica Soho	Included	
2015	Comguild Media Awards	Best Magazine Show	Kapuso Mo, Jessica Soho	Won	
2015	GADtimpala for Media Awards	Most Gender-Fair TV Program	Kapuso Mo, Jessica Soho	Won	
2015	Gawad Turismo Awards	Best TV Show	Kapuso Mo, Jessica Soho	Won	
2015	GIC Innovation Awards for Television	Most Innovative Magazine TV Show	Kapuso Mo, Jessica Soho	Won	
2015	GIC Innovation Awards for Television	Most Innovative Magazine TV Show Host	Jessica Soho	Won	
2015	Kagitingan Awards for Television	10 Pinakamagiting na Programang Pantelebisyon	Kapuso Mo, Jessica Soho	Included	
2015	MITv Gawad Kamalayan Awards	Natatanging Public Affairs Program	Kapuso Mo, Jessica Soho	Won	
2015	MITv Gawad Kamalayan Awards	Natatanging Public Affairs Program Host	Jessica Soho	Won	
2015	New York Festivals	"From Saudi with Love"	Human Interest	Finalist	
2015	Paragala Central Luzon Media Awards	Best Magazine Show	Kapuso Mo, Jessica Soho	Won	
2015	Paragala Central Luzon Media Awards	Best Magazine Show Host	Jessica Soho	Won	
2015	Platinum Stallion Media Awards	Best Public Affairs Program	Kapuso Mo, Jessica Soho	Won	
2015	29th PMPC Star Awards for Television	Best Magazine Show	Kapuso Mo, Jessica Soho	Nominated	
2015	29th PMPC Star Awards for Television	Best Magazine Show Host	Jessica Soho	Nominated	
2015	UmalohokJuan Awards	Best Magazine Show	Kapuso Mo, Jessica Soho	Won	
2015	UPLB Gandingan Awards	Best Magazine Program	Kapuso Mo, Jessica Soho	Won	
2015	UPLB Gandingan Awards	Best Magazine Program Host	Jessica Soho	Won	
2015	US International Film and Video Festival	"From Saudi with Love"	News Programming: Magazine Format	Creative Excellence	
2015	USTV Students' Choice Awards	Student Leaders' Choice of Social Media Campaign for Socio-Cultural Development	Kapuso Mo, Jessica Soho	Won	
2015	USTV Students' Choice Awards	Students' Choice of Magazine Program	Kapuso Mo, Jessica Soho	Won	
2015	USTV Students' Choice Awards	Awards of Excellence	Kapuso Mo, Jessica Soho	Won	
2016	Anak TV Seal Awards	Top Household Favorite Program	Kapuso Mo, Jessica Soho	Included	
2016	Anak TV Seal Awards	Anak TV Seal Awardee	Kapuso Mo, Jessica Soho	Included	
2016	GMMSF Box-Office Entertainment Awards	Most Popular TV Program for News and Public Affairs	Kapuso Mo, Jessica Soho	Won	
2016	NwSSU Students' Choice Awards for Radio and Television	Best Magazine Program	Kapuso Mo, Jessica Soho	Won	
2016	Paragala Central Luzon Media Awards	Best Magazine Show	Kapuso Mo, Jessica Soho	Won	
2016	Paragala Central Luzon Media Awards	Best Magazine Show Host	Jessica Soho	Won	
2016	30th PMPC Star Awards for Television	Best Magazine Show	Kapuso Mo, Jessica Soho	Nominated	
2016	30th PMPC Star Awards for Television	Best Magazine Show Host	Jessica Soho	Nominated	
2016	UmalohokJUAN Awards	Best Magazine Show	Kapuso Mo, Jessica Soho	Won	
2016	UPLB Gandingan Awards	Best Magazine Program	Kapuso Mo, Jessica Soho	Won	
2016	UPLB Gandingan Awards	Best Magazine Program Host	Jessica Soho	Won	
2017	8th Northwest Samar State University Students' Choice Awards for Radio and Television Awards	Best Magazine Program	Kapuso Mo, Jessica Soho	Won	
2017	31st PMPC Star Awards for Television	Best Magazine Show	Kapuso Mo, Jessica Soho	Won	
2017	31st PMPC Star Awards for Television	Best Magazine Show Host	Jessica Soho	Nominated	
2018	32nd PMPC Star Awards for Television	Best Magazine Show	Kapuso Mo, Jessica Soho	Won	
2018	32nd PMPC Star Awards for Television	Best Magazine Show Host	Jessica Soho	Nominated	
2019	33rd PMPC Star Awards for Television	Best Magazine Show	Kapuso Mo, Jessica Soho	Nominated	
2019	33rd PMPC Star Awards for Television	Best Magazine Show Host	Jessica Soho	Nominated	
2020	Asian Academy Creative Awards	Best Infotainment Program	Denmark Special	Won	
2020	42nd Catholic Mass Media Awards	Hall of Fame for Best News Magazine	Kapuso Mo, Jessica Soho	Won	
2021	34th PMPC Star Awards for Television	Best Magazine Show	Kapuso Mo, Jessica Soho	Won	
2021	34th PMPC Star Awards for Television	Best Magazine Show Host	Jessica Soho	Won	
2021	Asian Academy Creative Awards	Best Infotainment Programme	"Baby Switching"	Won	
2023	35th PMPC Star Awards for Television	Best Magazine Show	Kapuso Mo, Jessica Soho	Won	
2023	35th PMPC Star Awards for Television	Best Magazine Show Host	Jessica Soho	Nominated	
2023	Asia Contents Awards & Global OTT Awards	Best Reality & Variety	One At Heart Jessica Soho: Wounds Of Woes	Nominated	
2024	6th Gawad Lasallianeta	Most Outstanding Magazine Show	Kapuso Mo, Jessica Soho	Won	
2024	6th Gawad Lasallianeta	Most Outstanding Magazine Show Host	Jessica Soho	Won	
2024	52nd Box Office Entertainment Awards	Most Popular TV Program	Kapuso Mo, Jessica Soho	Won	
2024	Asian Academy Creative Awards	Best Infotainment Program	"If Looks Could Kill"	Won	
2025	37th PMPC Star Awards for Television	Best Magazine Show	Kapuso Mo, Jessica Soho	Nominated	
2025	37th PMPC Star Awards for Television	Best Magazine Show Host	Jessica Soho	Nominated	
