= List of awards and nominations received by Kim Chiu =

Kim Chiu awards and nominations
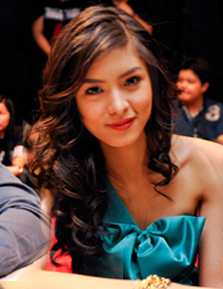
- Chiu in 2010
Awards and nominations
Award	Wins	Nominations

Totals (Note: Certain award groups do not simply award one winner. They acknowledge several different recipients, have runners-up, and have third place. Since this is a specific recognition and is different from losing an award, runner-up mentions are considered wins in this award tally. For simplification and to avoid errors, each award in this list has been presumed to have had a prior nomination.)
- Wins: 145
- Nominations: 80

Filipino-singer actress Kim Chiu has received several awards and nominations including eleven Box Office Entertainment Awards, nine PMPC Star Awards for Television, four EdukCircle Awards, two Gawad Pasado Awards, a FAMAS Award, a Gaward Tanglaw award, a PMPC Star Awards for Movie, The EDDYS Award, an Asia Pacific Luminare award, a Nickelodeon Kids Choice Award and a Seoul International Drama Award including nominations from Metro Manila Film Festival, Golden Screen TV Awards and Golden Screen Movie Awards.

Chiu co-starred in the drama movie I Love You, Goodbye (2010) and received several nominations for Best Supporting Actress from Metro Manila Film Festival, a FAMAS Award nomination, Gawad PASADO and Gawad Tanglaw nomination. For her role in the horror movie The Healing (2013), she received her second Best Supporting Actress nominations from FAMAS Award and Gawad PASADO and Gawad Tanglaw nominations. Chiu returned to romantic comedy in the book to movie adaptation Bakit Hindi Ka Crush ng Crush Mo? (2013) opposite Xiam Lim, for which she was nominated for FAMAS Award Best Actress. In 2022, she starred in the Viva movie Always and received The EDDYS' Best Actress nomination.

Chiu returned to television series in a melodrama thriller Linlang (2023) with Paulo Avelino and won Best Drama Actress at the 38th PMPC Star Awards for Television and received an Asian Star Prize award at the Seoul International Drama Awards including a nomination for Best Female lead in a TV Program in Content Asia Awards.

In music, she received various awards for her albums including five PMPC Star Awards for Music, two Myx Music Awards and MOR Pinoy Music Awards and three Awit Awards nominations.

== Awards and nominations ==
=== Major Awards and recognitions ===
Award	Year (Note: Indicates the year of ceremony. Each year is linked to the article about the awards held that year, wherever possible.)	Nominee / Work	Category	Result	Ref.
Awit Awards	2016	Mr. Right	Best Pop Recording	Nominated	
Awit Awards	2021	Bawal Lumabas (The Classroom Song)	Best Novelty Recording	Nominated	
Awit Awards	2024	Ms. Ukay	Best Novelty Recording	Nominated	
Alta Media Icon Awards	2015	Ikaw Lamang	Best Actress for Television (Drama)	Won	
Asian Television Awards	2024	What's Wrong with Secretary Kim?	Best Actress in a Leading Role	Nominated	
Asia Pacific Luminare Awards	2021	Kim Chiu	Favorite and Versatile Actress of the Year	Won	
Box Office Entertainment Awards	2007	First Day High	Most Promising Female Star	Nominated	
Box Office Entertainment Awards	2007	First Day High	Most Popular Love Team (Shared with Gerald Anderson)	Won	
Box Office Entertainment Awards	2008	I've Fallen For You	Most Popular Love Team of Movies & TV (Shared with Gerald Anderson.)	Won	
Box Office Entertainment Awards	2009	My Girl	Most Popular Love Team of Movies & TV (Shared with Gerald Anderson.)	Won	
Box Office Entertainment Awards	2010	Tayong Dalawa	Princess of Philippine Movies & TV	Won	
Box Office Entertainment Awards	2011	Till My Heartaches End	Most Popular Love Team of Movies & TV (Shared with Gerald Anderson.)	Won	
Box Office Entertainment Awards	2012	My Binondo Girl	Princess of Philippine Television	Won	
Box Office Entertainment Awards	2015	Bride for Rent	Princess of Philippine Movies and TV	Won	
Box Office Entertainment Awards	2016	Chinita Princess	Most Promising Female Recording Artist of the Year	Won	
Box Office Entertainment Awards	2017	The Story of Us	TV Actress of the Year	Won	
Box Office Entertainment Awards	2019	One Great Love	Film Actress of the Year	Won	
Box Office Entertainment Awards	2024 2024	It's Showtime Dream Maker	Female TV Host Female TV Host	Won	
Box Office Entertainment Awards	2025	Kim Chiu and Paulo Avelino	Most Popular Love Team of Philippine Entertainment	Won	
ContentAsia Awards	2024	Linlang	Best Female Lead in a TV Programme	Nominated	
ContentAsia Awards	2025	What's Wrong with Secretary Kim	Favorite Actress (Philippines) - Viewers' Choice Award	Won	
Eastwood City Walk of Fame	2010	Kim Chiu	Female Honorary Artist	Included	
EdukCircle Awards	2013	Ina Kapatid Anak	Best Television Actress	Won	
EdukCircle Awards	2014	Bride for Rent	Most Influential Film Actress of the Year	Won (Note: Tied with Toni Gonzaga.)	
EdukCircle Awards	2015	Ikaw Lamang	Best Television Actress	Won	
EdukCircle Awards	2016	The Story of Us	Best Drama Actress of the Year	Won (Note: Tied with Bela Padilla.)	
EdukCircle Awards	2017	Ikaw Lang Ang Iibigin	Best Actress in a TV Series	Nominated	
EdukCircle Awards	2019	Pinoy Big Brother: Otso	Best Female Reality Show Host	Nominated	
FAMAS Awards	2009	Kim Chiu	German Moreno Youth Achievement Award	Won	
FAMAS Awards	2010	I Love You, Goodbye	Best Supporting Actress	Nominated	
FAMAS Awards	2013	The Healing	Best Supporting Actress	Nominated	
FAMAS Awards	2014	Bakit Hindi Ka Crush ng Crush Mo?	Best Actress	Nominated	
Gawad PASADO	2010	I Love You, Goodbye	Pinakapasadong Katuwang na Aktres	Nominated	
Gawad PASADO	2012	Kim Chiu	Pinakapasadong Dangal ng Kabataan	Won	
Gawad PASADO	2013	The Healing	Pinakapasadong Katuwang na Aktres	Nominated	
Gawad PASADO	2016	Etiquette for Mistresses	Dangal ng Pasado sa Pangkatang Pagganap ng may Mataas na Papuri (Shared with Kris Aquino, Claudine Barretto, Iza Calzado and Cheena Crab.)	Won	
Gawad Tanglaw	2010	I Love You, Goodbye	Best Supporting Actress	Nominated	
Gawad Tanglaw	2010	Tayong Dalawa	Best Ensemble Performance in a Television Drama (Shared with the cast of Tayong Dalawa.)	Won	
Gawad Tanglaw	2013	The Healing	Best Supporting Actress	Nominated	
GEMS Hiyas ng Sining Awards	2019	Ipaglaban Mo: "Korea"	Best Actress (Single Performance)	Nominated	
GEMS Hiyas ng Sining Awards	2019	Maalaala Mo Kaya: "Mata"	Best Actress (Single Performance)	Won	
Golden Laurel Lyceans' Choice Media Awards	2022	It's Showtime	Best Variety Show Host/s (Shared with It's Showtime hosts.)	Won	
Golden Screen Awards	2007	First Day High	Outstanding Breakthrough Performance by an Actress	Nominated	
Golden Screen TV Awards	2014	Ina Kapatid Anak	Outstanding Performance by an Actress in a Drama Series	Nominated	
Metro Manila Film Festival	2009	I Love You, Goodbye	Best Supporting Actress	Nominated	
Metro Manila Film Festival	2018	One Great Love	Best Actress	Nominated	
MOR Pinoy Music Awards	2016	"Mr. Right"	LSS Hit Song of the Year	Won	
MOR Pinoy Music Awards	2018	"Okay na Ako"	LSS Hit Song of the Year	Nominated	
Myx Music Awards	2008	"Love Team" by The Itchyworms	Favorite Guest Appearance in a Music Video (Shared with Gerald Anderson.)	Won	
Myx Music Awards	2009	Kim Chiu	Favorite Myx Celebrity VJ	Nominated	
Myx Music Awards	2010	"Whisper, I love You"	Favorite Media Soundtrack (Shared with Gerald Anderson.)	Nominated	
Myx Music Awards	2014	"Discolamon" by Banda ni Kleggy	Favorite Guest Appearance in a Music Video	Won	
Myx Music Awards	2016	"Mr. Right"	Favorite Mellow Video	Nominated	
Myx Music Awards	2016	Kim Chiu	Favorite Myx Celebrity VJ	Nominated	
Myx Music Awards	2018	Kim Chiu	Favorite Myx Celebrity VJ	Nominated	
Nickelodeon Philippines Kids' Choice Awards	2008	My Girl	Favorite Actress	Won	
Nwssu Students' Choice Awards	2011	Tayong Dalawa	Best Actress in Primetime Teleserye	Won	
OFW Gawad Parangal Awards	2016	The Story of Us	Best Actress	Won	
PMPC Star Awards for Movies	2007	First Day High	New Movie Actress of the Year	Nominated	
PMPC Star Awards for Movies	2007	Kim Chiu	Female Star of the Night	Won (Note: Tied with Heart Evangelista.)	
PMPC Star Awards for Movies	2013	The Healing	Movie Supporting Actress of the Year	Nominated	
PMPC Star Awards for Movies	2016	All You Need Is Pag-ibig	Movie Love Team of the Year (Shared with Xian Lim.)	Nominated	
PMPC Star Awards for Movies	2017	Kim Chiu	Darling of the Press	Nominated	
PMPC Star Awards for Movies	2018	The Ghost Bride	Movie Actress of the Year	Nominated	
PMPC Star Awards for Movies	2018	Kim Chiu	Female Star of the Night	Won (Note: Tied with Joyce Peñas Pilarsky.)	
PMPC Star Awards for Music	2015	"Mr. Right"	Song of the Year	Nominated	
PMPC Star Awards for Music	2015	"Mr. Right"	Female Pop Artist of the Year	Nominated	
PMPC Star Awards for Music	2015	Kim Chiu	Erase Female Face of the Night	Won	
PMPC Star Awards for Music	2018	Chinita Princess: Touch of Your Love	Pop Album of the Year	Nominated	
PMPC Star Awards for Music	2018	"Okay Na Ako"	Female Pop Artist of the Year	Won	
PMPC Star Awards for Music	2022	"Wag Kang Bumitaw"	Dance Recording of the Year	Nominated	
PMPC Star Awards for Music	2022	"Bawal Lumabas (The Classroom Song)"	Female Pop Artist of the Year	Nominated	
PMPC Star Awards for Music	2022	"Bawal Lumabas (The Classroom Song)"	Novelty Artist of the Year	Won	
PMPC Star Awards for Music	2022	"Bawal Lumabas (The Classroom Song)"	Novelty Song of the Year	Won	
PMPC Star Awards for Music	2024	Mr. Ukay	Novelty Artist of the Year	Won	
PMPC Star Awards for Television	2007	Sana Maulit Muli	Best New Female TV Personality	Won	
PMPC Star Awards for Television	2010	Kung Tayo'y Magkakalayo	Best Drama Actress	Nominated	
PMPC Star Awards for Television	2013	Ina Kapatid Anak	Best Drama Actress	Nominated	
PMPC Star Awards for Television	2013	Kim Chiu	Female Star of the Night	Won	
PMPC Star Awards for Television	2014	Ikaw Lamang	Best Drama Actress	Won	
PMPC Star Awards for Television	2016	The Story of Us	Best Drama Actress	Nominated	
PMPC Star Awards for Television	2016	The Voice Kids	Best Talent Search Host (Shared with Luis Manzano and Robi Domingo.)	Won	
PMPC Star Awards for Television	2016	Kim Chiu	German Moreno Power Tandem of the Year (Shared with Xian Lim.)	Won	
PMPC Star Awards for Television	2017	Ikaw Lang Ang Iibigin	Best Drama Actress	Nominated	
PMPC Star Awards for Television	2018	Ipaglaban Mo: "Korea"	Best Single Performance by an Actress	Won	
PMPC Star Awards for Television	2019	Kim Chiu	TV Queens at the Turn of the Millenium	Included	
PMPC Star Awards for Television	2023	Maalaala Mo Kaya: "Pansit"	Best Single Performance by an Actress	Nominated	
PMPC Star Awards for Television	2023	It's Showtime	Best Female TV Host	Won	
PMPC Star Awards for Television	2025	Linlang	German Moreno Power Tandem of the Year (Shared with Paulo Avelino)	Won	
PMPC Star Awards for Television	2025	Linlang	Best Drama Actress	Won	
PMPC Star Awards for Television	2025	Pinoy Big Brother: Gen 11	Best Reality Show Host (shared with PBB Gen 11 hosts)	Won	
PMPC Star Awards for Television	2025	It's Showtime	Best Female TV Host	Won	
Sine Sandaan: Celebrating the Luminaries of Philippine Cinema	2019	Kim Chiu	Leading Lady ng Sentenaryo	Included	
Seoul International Drama Awards	2024	Linlang	Outstanding Asian Star	Won	
The Entertainment Editors Choice Awards	2021	Kim Chiu	Isah V. Red Award	Won	
The Entertainment Editors Choice Awards	2023	Always	Best Actress	Nominated	
USTv Students' Choice Awards	2010	Tayong Dalawa	Students Choice of Actress in a Daily Soap Opera	Won	
9th EDDYs	2026	My Love Will Make You Disappear	Box Office Heroes (Shared with Paulo Avelino)	Won	

=== Industry awards ===
Award	Year (Note: Indicates the year of ceremony. Each year is linked to the article about the awards held that year, wherever possible.)	Nominee / Work	Category	Result	Ref.
Anak TV Seal Awards	2008	Kim Chiu	Makabata Star	Won	
Anak TV Seal Awards	2009	Kim Chiu	Makabata Star	Won	
Anak TV Seal Awards	2010	Kim Chiu	Makabata Star	Won	
Anak TV Seal Awards	2011	Kim Chiu	Makabata Star	Won	
Anak TV Seal Awards	2012	Kim Chiu	Makabata Star	Won	
Anak TV Seal Awards	2013	Kim Chiu	Makabata Star	Won	
Anak TV Seal Awards	2014	Kim Chiu	Makabata Star	Won	
Anak TV Seal Awards	2016	Kim Chiu	Makabata Hall of Famer	Won	
Anak TV Seal Awards	2023	Kim Chiu	Net Makabata Star	Won	
Anak TV Seal Awards	2024	Kim Chiu	Net Makabata Star	Won	
Cebu City 79th Charter Day	2016	Kim Chiu	Special Recognition (Entertainment)	Won	
Cinema One Originals Award	2009	Kim Chiu	Viewers' Choice King and Queen of Hearts (Shared with Gerald Anderson.)	Won	
Cinema One Originals Award	2009	Kim Chiu	Viewers' Choice It List!	Won	
TAG Awards Chicago	2023	Kim Chiu	Female Celebrity of the Year	Nominated	
TAG Awards Chicago	2024	Linlang	Best Actress - Series	Won (Silver Champion)	
Yahoo OMG! Celebrity Awards	2012	My Binondo Girl	Love Team of the Year (Shared with Xian Lim.)	Won	
Yahoo OMG! Celebrity Awards	2012	My Binondo Girl	Breakthrough Actress of the Year	Won	
Yahoo OMG! Celebrity Awards	2012	Kim Chiu	Fan Club of the Year (Shared with Xian Lim.)	Won	
Yahoo OMG! Celebrity Awards	2013	Ina Kapatid Anak	Love Team of the Year (Shared with Xian Lim.)	Won	
Yahoo OMG! Celebrity Awards	2014	Kim Chiu	Celebrity of the Year	Won	
Yahoo OMG! Celebrity Awards	2014	Ikaw Lamang	Actress of the Year	Won	
Yahoo OMG! Celebrity Awards	2014	Kim Chiu	Fan Club of the Year (Shared with Xian Lim.)	Won	
Gawad Balisong (JCI Batangas)	2024	Kim Chiu	Outstanding Filipino Gamechangers of 2024	Won	
2nd Southeast Asian Premier Business and Achiever Award	2024	Kim Chiu	Premier Actress of the Year	Won	
Golden Dragon Awards	2025	Kim Chiu	Most Remarkable Filipino Actress and Empowered Brand Ambassador of the Year	Won	
Gawad Dangal Filipino Awards	2024	Kim Chiu	Best TV Actress	Won	
Gawad Dangal Filipino Awards	2025	Kim Chiu	Best TV Actress	Won	
Gawad Dangal Filipino Awards	2025	Kim Chiu	Most Outstanding & Popular Loveteam of the Year Grand Winner (Shared with Paulo Avelino)	Won	
Gawad Dangal Filipino Awards	2025	Kim Chiu	Most Popular Leading Lady	Won	
6th VP Choice Awards	2025	Kim Chiu/Linlang	Primetime TV Actress of the Year	Won	
7th VP Choice Awards	2026	Kim Chiu/ My Love Will Make You Disappear	Movie Actress of the Year	Won	
7th VP Choice Awards	2026	Kim Chiu	PIPOL Sexiest of the Year (1st Place)	Won	
2nd iMBC Awards (iMBC Entertainment Korea)	2026	Kim Chiu	Best Global Star	Won	[]

=== Popularity Awards ===
These are special awards including popularity awards, voting awards online and awards from vlogs and awards from own mother studios.

Award	Year (Note: Indicates the year of ceremony. Each year is linked to the article about the awards held that year, wherever possible.)	Nominee / Work	Category	Result	Ref.
ASAP Pop Viewers' Choice Awards	2006	First Day High	Pop Love Team (Shared with Gerald Anderson)	Won	
ASAP Pop Viewers' Choice Awards	2007	"Love Team" by The Itchyworms	Pop Celebrity Cameo (Shared with Gerald Anderson)	Won	
ASAP Pop Viewers' Choice Awards	2007	Sana Maulit Muli	Pop TV Character of the Year (Shared with Gerald Anderson)	Won	
ASAP Pop Viewers' Choice Awards	2008	My Girl	Pop TV Character of the Year (Shared with Gerald Anderson)	Won	
ASAP Pop Viewers' Choice Awards	2008	Kim Chiu	Pop Cover Girl	Nominated	
ASAP Pop Viewers' Choice Awards	2009	Kim Chiu	Pop Cover Girl	Won	
ASAP Pop Viewers' Choice Awards	2010	Paano Na Kaya	Pop Screen Kiss (Shared with Gerald Anderson)	Won	
ASAP Pop Viewers' Choice Awards	2010	Kung Tayo'y Magkakalayo	Pop TV Character (Shared with Gerald Anderson)	Won	
ASAP Pop Viewers' Choice Awards	2010	Kim Chiu	Pop Female Fashionista	Won	
ASAP Pop Viewers' Choice Awards	2011	Till My Heartaches End	Pop Screen Kiss	Won	
ASAP Pop Viewers' Choice Awards	2011	Till My Heartaches End	Pop Love Team (Shared with Gerald Anderson)	Won	
ASAP Pop Viewers' Choice Awards	2011	My Binondo Girl	Pop TV Character	Won	
ASAP Pop Viewers' Choice Awards	2011	Kim Chiu	Pop Female Fashionista	Won	
ASAP Pop Viewers' Choice Awards	2011	Kim Chiu	Pop Fans Club (Shared with Gerald Anderson.)	Won	
ASAP Pop Viewers' Choice Awards	2013	"Discolamon" by Banda ni Kleggy	Pop Celebrity Cameo	Won	
ASAP Pop Viewers' Choice Awards	2013	Bakit Hindi Ka Crush ng Crush Mo?	Pop Love Team (Shared with Xian Lim.)	Won	
ASAP Pop Viewers' Choice Awards	2013	Ina Kapatid Anak	Pop TV Character (Shared with Maja Salvador.)	Nominated	
ASAP Pop Viewers' Choice Awards	2013	Kim Chiu	Pop Female Fashionista	Won	
ASAP Pop Viewers' Choice Awards	2013	Kim Chiu	Pop Fans Club (Shared with Xian Lim)	Won	
ASAP Pop Viewers' Choice Awards	2014	Bride for Rent	Pop Screen Kiss (Shared with Xian Lim)	Won	
ASAP Pop Viewers' Choice Awards	2014	Bride for Rent	Pop Love Team (Shared with Xian Lim)	Nominated	
ASAP Pop Viewers' Choice Awards	2014	Kim Chiu	Pop Female Fashionista	Won	
ASAP Pop Viewers' Choice Awards	2014	Kim Chiu	Pop Cover Girl	Nominated	
ASAP Pop Viewers' Choice Awards	2014	Kim Chiu	Pop Fans Club (Shared with Xian Lim)	Won	
ASAP Pop Viewers' Choice Awards	2014	Kim Chiu	Pop Selfie	Won	
Barkada Choice Awards	2011	Kim Chiu	Choice Female Icon of the Year	Won	
Barkada Choice Awards	2011	Till My Heartaches End	Choice Actress of the Year	Won	
Bet ng Bandera Awards	2016	Kim Chiu	Female Celebrity of the Year	Won	
PEP List Awards	2014	Kim Chiu	Pepsters' Choice Female Newsmaker of the Year	Won	
PEP List Awards	2014	Ina Kapatid Anak	Pepsters' Choice Female TV Star of the Year	Won	
PEP List Awards	2014	Kim Chiu	Celebrity Pair of the Year (Shared with Xian Lim.)	Won	
PEP List Awards	2014	Ina Kapatid Anak	Editors' Choice Female TV Star of the Year	Nominated	
PEP List Awards	2015	Bride for Rent	Female Movie Star of the Year	Won	
PEP List Awards	2015	Kim Chiu	FAB Female Star of the Year	Won	
PEP List Awards	2015	Kim Chiu	Celebrity Pair of the Year (Shared with Xian Lim.)	Won	
PEP List Awards	2017	Kim Chiu	Celebrity Pair of the Year (Shared with Xian Lim.)	Nominated	
Philippine Social Media Week Awards	2019	Kim Chiu	Female Celebrity of the Year	Won	
Pure Magic	2019	Kim Chiu	Star of the Night	Won	
Push Awards	2015	Kim Chiu	Push Like Favorite Female Celebrity	Won	
Push Awards	2015	Kim Chiu	Push Gram Most Popular Female Celebrity	Nominated	
Push Awards	2016	Kim Chiu	Push Gram Most Popular Female Celebrity	Nominated	
Push Awards	2016	Kim Chiu	Push Gram Most Popular Music Artist	Won	
Push Awards	2017	Kim Chiu	Push Celebrity Fitspiration of the Year	Won	
Push Awards	2019	Kim Chiu	Push Female Celebrity of the Year	Won	
Push Awards	2019	The Ghost Bride	Push Female Movie Performance of the Year	Nominated	
Push Awards	2019	Kim Chiu	Push Celebrity Travel of the Year	Nominated	
Push Awards	2019	Kim Chiu	Push Celebrity Fitspiration of the Year	Won	
Push Awards	2019	Kim Chiu	Push Celebrity Squad of the Year (Shared with Bela Padilla and Angelica Panganiban.)	Won	
Push Awards	2020	Kim Chiu	Push Travel Goals	Won	
Push Awards	2020	Kim Chiu	Push Fitness Goals	Won	
Push Awards	2020	Kim Chiu	Push Friendship Goals (Shared with Bela Padilla and Angelica Panganiban.)	Won	
Push Awards	2021	Kim Chiu	Push Popular Digital Star	Nominated	
Push Awards	2021	Kim Chiu	Push Fitspiration Celebrity	Won	
Push Awards	2021	Kim Chiu	Push Inspiration	Won (Note: Tied with Angel Locsin and Iza Calzado.)	
Push Awards	2022	Kim Chiu	Push Content Creator of the Year	Won	
Push Awards	2024	Linlang	Push Favorite Onscreen Performance of 2023 for TV	Nominated	
Rawr Awards	2015	Must Date the Playboy	Trending Love Team of the Year (Shared with Xian Lim.)	Nominated	
Rawr Awards	2015	"Mr. Right"	Female Performer of the Year	Nominated	
Rawr Awards	2015	Kim Chiu	Fan Club of the Year (Shared with Xian Lim.)	Nominated	
Rawr Awards	2016	Kim Chiu	Fan Club of the Year (Shared with Xian Lim.)	Nominated	
Rawr Awards	2018	Star Hunt: The Grand Audition Show	Favorite TV Host (Shared with Robi Domingo.)	Nominated	
Rawr Awards	2019	Kim Chiu	Fan Club of the Year (Shared with Xian Lim.)	Nominated	
Rawr Awards	2020	Love Thy Woman	Actress of the Year	Nominated	
Rawr Awards	2020	Kim Chiu	Breakthrough Artist of the Year	Nominated	
Rawr Awards	2020	"Bawal Lumabas (The Classroom Song)"	Song of the Year	Nominated	
Rawr Awards	2020	Kim Chiu	Fan Club of the Year (Shared with Xian Lim.)	Nominated	
Rawr Awards	2021	Kim Chiu	Vlogger of the Year (Long)	Nominated	
Rawr Awards	2021	Kim Chiu	Fan Club of the Year (Shared with Xian Lim.)	Nominated	
Rawr Awards	2022	Always	Actress of the Year	Nominated	
Rawr Awards	2022	Kim Chiu	Fan Club of the Year (Shared with Xian Lim.)	Nominated	
Rawr Awards	2023	Linlang	Actress of the Year	Won	
Rawr Awards	2023	Kim Chiu	Vlogger of the Year (Long)	Nominated	
Rawr Awards	2023	Kim Chiu	Fan Club of the Year (Shared with Xian Lim.)	Nominated	
Star Cinema Online Awards	2014	Kim Chiu	Newsmaker of the Year	Nominated	
Star Cinema Online Awards	2014	Wrecking Bowl with Kim Chiu	Fan Favorite Wrecking Bowl	Won	
Star Cinema Online Awards	2014	Kim Chiu	Best Fandom	Nominated	
Star Cinema Online Awards	2014	Bride for Rent	Favorite Love Team (Shared with Xian Lim.)	Won	
Star Cinema Online Awards	2014	Bride for Rent	Favorite Female Movie Star	Won	
Star Cinema Online Awards	2015	"Mr. Right"	Favorite Song	Won	
Star Cinema Online Awards	2015	Kim Chiu	Favorite Social Media Celebrity	Won	
Star Cinema Online Awards	2015	Chinita Princess	Favorite Album	Won	
Star Cinema Online Awards	2015	Ikaw Lamang	Favorite TV Love Team (Shared with Xian Lim.)	Nominated	
Star Cinema Online Awards	2016	Kim Chiu	Favorite Fandom (Shared with Xian Lim.)	Nominated	
Star Cinema Online Awards	2016	The Story of Us	Favorite Female Star	Won	
Star Cinema Online Awards	2016	The Story of Us	Favorite TV Love Team (Shared with Xian Lim.)	Nominated	
Star Cinema Online Awards	2017	Chinita Princess: Touch of Your Love	Ultimate Recording Artist	Won	
Star Cinema Online Awards	2017	Kim Chiu	Ultimate Fandom (Shared with Xian Lim.)	Won	
Star Magic Ball	2009	Kim Chiu	Couple of the Night (Shared with Gerald Anderson.)	Won (Note: Tied with Piolo Pascual and KC Concepcion.)	
Star Magic Ball	2010	Kim Chiu	Best Dressed (Shared with Gerald Anderson.)	Won	
Star Magic Ball	2011	Kim Chiu	Drop-dead Stunner	Won	
Star Magic Ball	2012	Kim Chiu	Couple of the Night (Shared with Xian Lim.)	Won	
Star Magic Ball	2013	Kim Chiu	Moet and Chandon Fabulous Pair (Shared with Xian Lim.)	Won	
Star Magic Ball	2015	Kim Chiu	Couple of the Night (Shared with Xian Lim.)	Won	
Us Girls August Awards	2009	Kim Chiu	Face of the Year	Won (Note: Tied with Isabelle Daza and Tweetie De Leon.)	
Us Girls August Awards	2010	Kim Chiu	Face of the Year (20s)	Won (Note: Tied with Kristine Hermosa.)	
Us Girls August Awards	2011	Kim Chiu	Most Fashionable (Female)	Nominated	
VP Choice Awards	2021	Love Thy Woman	TV Actress of the Year	Nominated	
