= PMPC Star Award for Best Drama Actor and Actress =

The PMPC Star Award for Best Drama Actor and Actress is given to the best actors and actresses in a television drama of the year.

== Winners ==
Year	Best Drama Actor	TV Show	Best Drama Actress	TV Show
1987	Ronaldo Valdez	Maynila Ngayon; GMA 7	Coney Reyes	Coney Reyes On Camera; RPN 9
1988	Juan Rodrigo	Banyuhay; RPN 9	Maricel Soriano	Maricel Regal Drama Special ABS-CBN 2
1989	Dante Rivero	Kadenang Rosas; GMA 7	Maricel Soriano	Maricel Regal Drama Special ABS-CBN 2
1990	Christopher de Leon	Elias A.D. ABS-CBN 2	Coney Reyes	Coney Reyes on Camera; ABS-CBN 2
1991	Joel Torre	Boracay; RPN 9	Coney Reyes	Coney Reyes on Camera; ABS-CBN 2
1992	Julio Diaz	Davao; RPN 9	Cherie Gil	Cebu; RPN 9
1993	Tirso Cruz III	Valiente; ABS-CBN 2	Nora Aunor	Star Drama Theater Presents: Nora; ABS-CBN 2
1994:	Tirso Cruz III	Valiente; ABS-CBN 2	Coney Reyes	Coney Reyes on Camera; ABS-CBN 2
1995	Tirso Cruz III; Keempee de Leon	Villa Quintana, 'GMA 7 Valiente, GMA 7 &	Coney Reyes	Coney Reyes on Camera; ABS-CBN 2
1996	Keempee de Leon	Villa Quintana; GMA 7	Isabel Rivas	Villa Quintana; GMA 7
1997	Tirso Cruz III; Ricky Davao	Valiente, GMA 7 Familia Zaragoza, ABS-CBN 2	Maricel Soriano	Maricel Drama Special; ABS-CBN 2
1998	Bembol Roco	Esperanza; ABS-CBN 2	Princess Punzalan	Mula Sa Puso; ABS-CBN 2
1999	Dante Rivero	Sa Sandaling Kailangan Mo Ako; ABS-CBN 2	Hilda Koronel	Sa Sandaling Kailangan Mo Ako; ABS-CBN 2
2000	Dominic Ochoa	Labs Ko Si Babe; ABS-CBN 2	Gladys Reyes	Saan Ka Man Naroroon; ABS-CBN 2
2001	John Lloyd Cruz	Tabing Ilog ABS-CBN 2	Eula Valdez	Pangako Sa'Yo; ABS-CBN 2
2002	Eddie Garcia	(Kung Mawawala Ka; GMA 7	Jean Garcia	Pangako Sa'Yo; ABS-CBN 2
2003:	John Estrada	Kay Tagal Kang Hinintay; ABS-CBN 2	Snooky Serna	Habang Kapiling Ka; GMA 7
2004	Diether Ocampo	Sana'y Wala Nang Wakas; ABS-CBN 2	Lorna Tolentino	Kay Tagal Kang Hinintay; ABS-CBN 2
2005	John Lloyd Cruz	It Might Be You; ABS-CBN 2	Judy Ann Santos	Krystala; ABS-CBN 2
2006	Diether Ocampo	Ikaw ang Lahat sa Akin; ABS-CBN 2	Maricel Soriano	Vietnam Rose; ABS-CBN 2
2007	John Lloyd Cruz	Maging Sino Ka Man; ABS-CBN 2	Sunshine Dizon	Bakekang; GMA 7
2008	Piolo Pascual	Lobo; ABS-CBN 2	Sunshine Dizon	Impostora; GMA 7
2009	Coco Martin	Tayong Dalawa; ABS-CBN 2	Gina Pareño	Tayong Dalawa; ABS-CBN 2
2010	Dingdong Dantes	Stairway to Heaven; GMA 7	Maricel Soriano	Sineserye Presents: Florinda; ABS-CBN 2
2011	Coco Martin	Minsan Lang Kita Iibigin; ABS-CBN 2	Gretchen Barretto	Magkaribal; ABS-CBN 2
2012	Jericho Rosales	Dahil Sa Pag-ibig; ABS-CBN 2	Nora Aunor; Helen Gamboa	Sa Ngalan Ng Ina, TV5; Walang Hanggan, ABS-CBN 2
2013	Coco Martin; Richard Yap	Juan dela Cruz; Be Careful With My Heart, ABS-CBN	Marian Rivera	Temptation of Wife; GMA 7
2014	Coco Martin	Ikaw Lamang; ABS-CBN 2	Kim Chiu	Ikaw Lamang; ABS-CBN 2
2015	Alden Richards	Illustrado; GMA 7	Maja Salvador	Bridges of Love; ABS-CBN 2
2016	Coco Martin	Ang Probinsyano; ABS-CBN 2	Jennylyn Mercado	My Faithful Husband; GMA 7
2017	Dingdong Dantes; Ruru Madrid	Alyas Robin Hood / GMA 7 Encantadia / GMA 7	Sylvia Sanchez	The Greatest Love; ABS-CBN 2
2018	Joshua Garcia; Jerome Ponce	The Good Son / ABS-CBN 2	Yasmien Kurdi	Hindi Ko Kayang Iwan Ka; GMA 7
2019	Jericho Rosales	Halik / ABS-CBN 2	Angel Locsin	The General's Daughter; ABS-CBN 2
2020	JM de Guzman	Pamilya Ko / ABS-CBN 2	Sylvia Sanchez	Pamilya Ko; ABS-CBN 2
2021	JM de Guzman	Init Sa Magdamag; A2Z 11/TV5	Jodi Sta. Maria	Ang Sa Iyo Ay Akin; A2Z 11/TV5
2023	Joshua Garcia	Unbreak My Heart; GMA 7	Rhian Ramos	Royal Blood; GMA 7
2024	Piolo Pascual	Pamilya Sagrado; A2Z 11/TV5	Kim Chiu	Linlang; A2Z 11/TV5

== Multiple awards for Best Actor ==
Actor	Record Set
Coco Martin	5
Tirso Cruz III	4
John Lloyd Cruz	3
Keempee de Leon	2
Dingdong Dantes	2
Dante Rivero	2
Diether Ocampo	2
Jericho Rosales	2
JM De Guzman	2
Joshua Garcia	2
Piolo Pascual	2

== Multiple awards for Best Drama Actress ==
Actress	Record Set
Coney Reyes	5
Maricel Soriano	5
Sunshine Dizon	2
Nora Aunor	2
Sylvia Sanchez	2
Kim Chiu	2
