= The Ghost Bride =

- Theatrical release poster
- Directed by: Chito S. Roño
- Screenplay by: Chito S. Roño; Charlson L. Ong; Cathy Camarillo
- Story by: Chito S. Roño; Enrico C. Santos; Juvy Galamiton
- Produced by: Charo Santos-Concio; Malou N. Santos
- Starring: Kim Chiu; Matteo Guidicelli; Christian Bables; Alice Dixson
- Cinematography: Neil Daza
- Edited by: Carlo Francisco Manatad
- Music by: Carmina Cuya
- Production company: Star Cinema
- Release date: November 1, 2017
- Country: Philippines
- Languages: Filipino; Chinese; English
- Box office: ₱100million

The Ghost Bride (Chinese: 鬼新娘; pinyin: Guǐ xīnniáng; Pe̍h-ōe-jī: Kúi sin-niû) is a 2017 Filipino supernatural horror film starring Kim Chiu, Matteo Guidicelli, Christian Bables, and Alice Dixson. It is directed by Chito S. Roño and produced by Star Cinema.

The film marked the reunion of Chiu and Guidicelli after My Binondo Girl in 2011, and also their first movie project together. It is Chiu's third movie with Roño. The movie was released in theaters on November 1, 2017.

The film revolves around a girl who is offered wealth for her loved ones in exchange for a spiritual ritual.

== Plot ==
Mayen Lim is an independent middle daughter of a financially struggling family, who serve as Chinese opera playwrights at a temple composed of her parents Manuel and Dolores, her cousin Matt, and her aunts Jana and Akoh. Mayen has a relationship with Clinton Yu, an architect from a controlling middle-class family who plans to migrate to Cebu to attend a wedding of his brother's co-worker.

On the night of the wedding, Mayen meets Angie Lao, a Cantonese matchmaker who offers her an opportunity to participate in a ghost marriage and become the wife of the late Xu Jian Rong from a wealthy family in exchange for her family's debts. She initially declines the request the day after, but when Manuel's employer and debtor Robert Ong threatens to sue the family in favor for his marriage to Mayen, the latter accepts Lao's offer of performing the ritual to acquire the money, and receives a bracelet as the bachelor’s family heirloom and a down payment of her emigration to China for the marriage.

The next night, Mayen is assaulted by Robert, who escapes after encountering the malevolent presence of five yaogui, including Xu Jian Rong's, surrounding her house. The spirits follow him to his house where he is killed by the groom's yaogui, who rips out his heart. During Robert's funeral the following night, Mayen berates Clinton for cheating on her after the latter undergoes an arranged engagement with another woman, which Mayen learns from her brother Victor. During their confrontation, the ghost possessing Clinton kills him. When Mayen realizes what the ritual that is responsible for Robert and Clinton's deaths is capable of, she takes off the bracelet. The ghosts attack as Akoh is lured out of the bedroom and killed before Mayen can escape the house with her. Mayen confronts Lao to stop the ordeal, and the latter reveals she attempted to convince her parents earlier before her when Manuel declines during their initial meeting.

Mayen seeks help from the temple's abbot Lee and the nuns led by Suan Ming. The monks use a blessed singing bowl on the bracelet to ward off the ghosts when the bowl sounds. Suan reveals that Xu Jian Rong's yaogui was a soul collector from the fourth realm of Diyu ruled by Wuguan Wang who was protected by the other four female ghosts who were his concubines to prevent the ritual from being disrupted. After arriving home, Mayen is contacted by her childhood friend and programmer David Chao who reveals that his group was hired by Lao three years ago to select six women, including Mayen, who was currently selected born under the Water Rooster year to partake in the ghost marriage that resulted in the disappearance of the other five participants before her. He provides a ceremonial exorcism with the monks to end the deal with the spirit which will be held on her wedding day.

The day before their departure to China for the ritual, Lao discovers that Mayen did not appear at the airport and confronts her family. Manuel tells her that she had left one day ago with David to go to Nepal and end the ghost marriage. The two arrive at a Buddhist temple to start the exorcism. During the ritual, Mayen destroys the bracelet as her soul is sent to the netherworld after Xu Jian Rong abducts Manuel at the house during a performance of a ritual opera for the exorcism with his family and the temple clergy. Mayen awakens at the Lake of Fire and Blood and is accosted by tormented souls, including Clinton and Robert. She finds Manuel, who apologizes to her, as they fend off Xu Jian Rong's concubines. Meanwhile, the ghost kills Lao after failing to offer Mayen to him. Her soul arrives at the realm and tries to kill Mayen but is stopped by Akoh's spirit, allowing Mayen and her father to escape the realm through the gateway where they awaken from their sleep. Mayen then burns Xu Jian Rong's portrait to destroy his spirit and complete the exorcism while Manuel and his wife watch their opera peacefully.

In the post-credits scene, Xu Jian Rong's yaogui reincarnates in Lao's body, vowing to get Mayen.

== Cast ==
=== Main cast ===
- Kim Chiu as Mayen Lim, its sixth choosing The Ghost Bride, Manuel and Dolores Lim's younger daughter
- Matteo Guidicelli as Clinton Yu
- Christian Bables as David Chao
- Alice Dixson as Angie Lao, Cantonese matchmaker

=== Supporting cast ===
- Robert Seña as Manuel Lim, Mayan and Victor Lim's father, and Uncle Fidel Lim's nephew
- Ina Raymundo as Dolores Lim, Mayan and Victor Lim's mother, Manuel Lim's wife, and Uncle Fidel Lim's niece-in-law
- Beverly Salviejo as Akoh Lim, Manuel's aunt
- Kakai Bautista as Jana
- Mon Confiado as Robert Ong
- Victor Silayan as Victor Lim, Manuel Lim's Older son
- Jerome Ponce as Matt, Mayan's cousin
- Bea Saw as Jane Lim, Victor Lim's wife, Mayan Lim's sister-in-law
- Ku Aquino as Xu Jian Rong
- Nanding Josef as Abbot
- Isay Alvarez as Suan Ming
- Elizabeth Chua as Tingting

=== Minor cast ===
- Bernardo Carritero as Norbing
- JR Versales as Temple Assistant
- Ma Socorro Canlas as Lenny
- Krizzia Mae Orjaleza as Stephanie Lim, Victor and Jane Lim's older daughter
- Geson Granado as Samuel Lim, Victor and Jane Lim's younger son
- Nellie Ang as Mahjong Player
- Tina Payumo as Assistant Monk 1
- Edna Caday as Assistant Monk 2
- Jessa Bisnar as Winter Ghost Bride
- Rey Ann Guilas as Summer Ghost Bride
- Krissa Ann Espinosa as Spring Ghost Bride
- Angelica Nicole Julian as Autumn Ghost Bride
- Ronnie Golpeo as Ron
- Chris Fong as Daryl
- Bi Hua Lim as Mulien Mother

=== Guest cast ===
- Ryan Bang as Passerby
- Jhong Hilario as Passerby
- Denise Joaquin as Maimai
- Luz Fernandez as Lalaine Yu, Clinton's grandaunt
- Eddie Ngo as Censio Yu, Clinton's granduncle
- Janice Hung as Chinese Lady

== See also ==
- List of ghost films
- Feng Shui
- Sukob
- Tenement 2
- Feng Shui 2
- The Healing
