= Matteo Guidicelli discography =

- Studio albums: 2

Cebuano singer Matteo Guidicelli has released two studio albums.

Guidicelli released his debut album Matteo Guidicelli in January 2015, which included the song "Ipapadama Na Lang".

== Albums ==
=== Studio albums ===
Year	Album	Certifications (sales thresholds)
2015	Matteo Guidicelli: Released: 1 January 2015; Label: Star Music; Format: CD, digital download	PARI: Gold

Year	Album	Certifications (sales thresholds)
2017	Hey: Released: 1 December 2017; Label: Star Music; Format: CD, digital download	PARI:

== Singles ==
=== As lead artist ===
List of singles as featured artist, with selected chart positions and certifications, showing year released and album name
Title	Year	Sales	Certifications	Album
"Ipapadama Na Lang"	2015			Matteo Guidicelli
"Hey"	2017			Hey
