= Richard Yap =

Filipino actor, singer, model and businessman (born 1967)

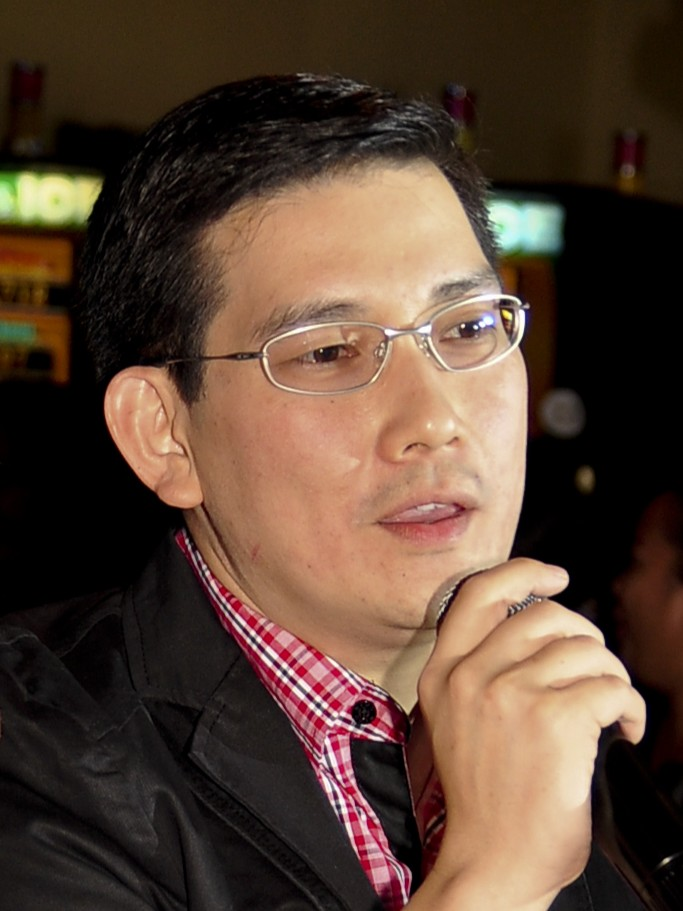
- Yap in 2012
- Born: Richard Edison Uy Yap; May 18, 1967 (age 59); Cebu City, Philippines
- Other names: Papa Chen; Sir Chief
- Education: Sacred Heart School – Ateneo de Cebu
- Alma mater: De La Salle University
- Occupations: Actor; singer; businessman; model
- Years active: 2010–present
- Agents: ABS-CBN (2010–2020); Regal Entertainment (2015–present); Sparkle GMA Artist Center (2020–present)
- Political party: NUP (2021–present)
- Other political affiliations: PDP–Laban (2018–c. 2019); BARUG (2018–c. 2019)
- Spouse: Melody Leva Yap (m. 1993)
- Children: 2

Richard Edison Uy Yap (born May 18, 1967) is a Filipino actor and recording artist. He is best known for portraying Richard "Sir Chief" Lim in Be Careful with My Heart and "Papa Chen" in My Binondo Girl. And from 2022 to 2024, he portrays Dr. RJ "Obeng" Tanyag in Abot-Kamay na Pangarap.

== Career ==
In 2011, Yap launched his acting career in ABS-CBN via My Binondo Girl where he played Kim Chiu's father, Chen Sy.

In 2012, Yap played a recurring character in Walang Hanggan as Henry de Dios. But his role as Richard "Sir Chief" Lim in the daytime drama Be Careful with My Heart catapulted him to fame spreading to other countries and made him a household name. The show ran from 2012 to 2014 due to its large following and loyal fanbase. Be Careful with My Heart would go on to have worldwide tours, concerts, an album, and has been aired in numerous other continents.

After Be Careful with My Heart, Yap starred in Nasaan Ka Nang Kailangan Kita, where his character was paired with Vina Morales, and FPJ's Ang Probinsyano, portraying a criminal underworld character by the name of Philip Tang, and had a special participation in My Super D and Till I Met You.

In 2016, he and Sta. Maria reunited onscreen and topbilled the romantic film The Achy Breaky Hearts which was a box office success. Because of this, there is a strong clamor for them to also reunite on television.

On his singing career, Yap along with Richard Poon collaborated in an album and a major concert.

He topbilled the 2016 installment of Regal Films' Mano Po 7: Chinoy.

On December 16, 2020, he signed his management contract with GMA Artist Center.

== Filmography ==
=== Film ===
Year	Title	Role
2013	Ekstra	Himself (cameo)
2014	Past Tense	Old Babs
2014	The Amazing Praybeyt Benjamin	General Wilson Chua
2015	You're Still The One	Vincent
2015	Felix Manalo	Glicerio Santos
2016	Just the 3 of Us	Capt. Alex Gatchalian
2016	The Achy Breaky Hearts	Frank Sison
2016	Mano Po 7: Chinoy	Wilson Wong, Sr.
2025	Fatherland	
2025	Ang Happy Homes ni Diane Hilario	Phillip

=== Television ===
Year	Title	Role	Ref.	Notes
2010	Precious Hearts Romances Presents: Kristine	Jandy		
2011–2012	My Binondo Girl	Chen "Papa Chen" Sy		
2012–2020	ASAP	Himself/Performer		
2012	Maalaala Mo Kaya: Gayuma	Edgar		
2012	Walang Hanggan	Henry De Dios		
2012–2014	Be Careful with My Heart	CEO Richard "Ser Chief/Ricardo/Ricky" Lim		
2015	Home Sweetie Home	Dr. Richard Dee		
2015	Wansapanataym: My Kung Fu Chinito	Peter Tan/Mang Bai/former Kungfu Chinito		
2015	Nasaan Ka Nang Kailangan Kita	Carlo Asuncion		
2015–2016	FPJ's Ang Probinsyano	Philip Tang		
2016	My Super D	Delta/original Super D		
2016	Till I Met You	Oliver "Tito Papa" Duico		
2018	Sana Dalawa ang Puso	Martin Co		
2019–2020	Kadenang Ginto (Season 3)	Leonardo "Leon" Herrera		
2021	Dear Uge Presents: Jing, Ang Bato	Julio Abril		
2021	All-Out Sundays	Himself/Guest		
2021	I Can See You: On My Way to You!	George Alfonso		
2021	Almost Paradise	—		
2021	Magpakailanman: Gwa ai Di, I Love You: The Richard and Melody Yap Story	Himself/Guest		
2021–2022	I Left My Heart in Sorsogon	Tonito Wenceslao III		
2022–2024	Abot-Kamay na Pangarap	Dr. Robert Jose "RJ/Obeng" Tanyag		
2023	Unbreak My Heart	Matteo "Matt" Zhang		
2023	Magandang Dilag	Dr. Robert Jose "RJ" Tanyag		
2023–present	It's Showtime	Himself/Guest/Performer		
2026	Never Say Die	Tomas "Berdugo" Limjoco		

== Music ==
Richard Yap (2013)
Track No.	Title	Time
1	Promise Ain't Enough	5:01
2	I Think I'm in Love Again	4:01
3	Don't Know What to Do	3:18
4	Can't Find No Reason	3:02
5	You Take My Breath Away	3:20
6	Chasing Cars	4:00
7	High	4:41
8	After Glow	3:02
9	Oh Babe – Chinese Version	3:12
10	Please Be Careful with My Heart (ft. Jodi Sta. Maria)	3:42
11	Salamat	4:34

Richard X Richard: The Chinito Crooners (2016)
Track No.	Title	Artist	Time
1	Love Boat	Richard Poon	2:45
2	Can't Smile Without You	Richard Poon	2:36
3	Grow Old With You	Richard Poon	2:41
4	The Last Time	Richard Poon	3:56
5	Goodbye	Richard Poon	4:06
6	You'll Never Find Another Love Like Mine	Richard Yap	4:28
7	Nothing's Gonna Change My Love for You	Richard Yap	4:07
8	You Can't Hurry Love	Richard Yap	2:49
9	Don't Know What to Do, Don't Know What to Say (She's The One Movie Soundtrack)	Richard Yap	3:16
10	Promise Ain't Enough	Richard Yap	4:58

== Soundtracks ==
– 2013 She's the One (Film) (performer: "Don't Know What to Do, Don't Know What to Say")

– 2013 Four Sisters and a Wedding (Film) (performer: "Salamat")

– 2012 Sarah G Live (TV Series) (performer – 1 episode)

– Robi Domingo/Richard Yap/K Brosas/Ate Gay/Kedebon Colim/Cacai Bautista/Bb. Gandanghari (2012) ... (performer: "The Way You Look Tonight")

– 2012 Be Careful with My Heart (TV Series) (performer – 1 episode)

– Maya Is Determined to Chase Her Dreams (2012) ... (performer: "Please Be Careful with My Heart")

== Awards and nominations ==
Awards and Nomination
Year	Award giving body	Category	Nominated work	Results
2012	Golden Screen TV Awards	Breakthrough Performance of an Actor	My Binondo Girl	Won
2012	26th PMPC Star Awards for Television	Best New Male TV Personality	My Binondo Girl	Nominated
2012	Anak TV Seal Awards	Favorite Anak TV Makabata Stars (shared with Jodi Sta. Maria)	—N/a	Won
2013	Gawad Tanglaw Awards	Best Ensemble Performance (shared with Be Careful with My Heart cast)	Be Careful with My Heart	Won
2013	GMMSF Box-Office Entertainment Awards	Most Popular Love Team on Television (shared with Jodi Sta. Maria)	Be Careful with My Heart	Won
2013	27th PMPC Star Awards for TV	Best Drama Actor	Be Careful with My Heart	Won
2014	1st Paragala Central Luzon Media Awards	Best Television Actor	Be Careful with My Heart	Won
2014	GMMSF Box-Office Entertainment Awards	Most Popular Love Team on Television (shared with Jodi Sta. Maria)	Be Careful with My Heart	Won
2023	12th Northwest Samar State University Students' Choice Awards for Radio and Television	Best Supporting Actor (shared with Abot-Kamay na Pangarap cast)	Abot-Kamay na Pangarap	Won

== Politics ==
Yap was a candidate for representative of Cebu City's north district in the 2019 elections. Running under BARUG-PDP–Laban, he failed to unseat the incumbent Raul del Mar. Yap finished second out of four candidates.

Yap ran once again for the same congressional seat in the 2022 elections under the National Unity Party but did not win.

== Personal life ==
Richard Edison Uy Yap was born and raised in Cebu City. He graduated from Sacred Heart School in Cebu and then to De La Salle University for College. Coming from a family who loves to cook, Yap aspired a to be chef in his younger years. He owns/co-founded several food businesses, such as a gastropub and Asian cuisine restaurant.

In 1993, he married Melody Yap, with whom he has two children, Ashley and Dylan.
