= Chinita Princess =

Studio album by Kim Chiu
- Released: April 27, 2015
- Recorded: 2014–2015
- Genre: Pop; OPM; Easy Listening
- Language: Tagalog; English
- Label: Star Music

Kim Chiu chronology
Gwa Ai Di (2007)	Chinita Princess (2015)

Singles from Chinita Princess
- 1. "Mr. Right" Released: April 3, 2015; 2. "Darating Din" Released: June 14, 2015

Chinita Princess is the second studio album and EP by Filipino singer-actress Kim Chiu. It was released on April 27, 2015, through Star Music for physical release and digital download on iTunes. Chinita Princess is a pop album that was describe by Chiu herself as "a reflection of her optimism, a result of looking at life from a positive perspective". It marks Chiu's return to the music industry after an eight-year hiatus prior to release of her debut album Gwa Ai Di back in 2007.

"Mr. Right" was released on April 3, 2015, on MOR 101.9 and on YouTube as the album's lead single. "Darating Din" was released on June 14, 2015, as the album's second single.

== Background ==
The album was produced by Rox Santos and is composed of six tracks. It consists of five original songs, and a cover of Wala Man Sayo ang Lahat(originally by Myrus Apacible). Kim Chiu personally handpicked the track list, which comprises songs that evoke happiness, inspiration and hope. She wanted it to sound more personalized and the album exactly describes her present state of mind.

“I am happy, very happy and very contented. I can say that I’m blessed," she said. "I’ll just express myself. I don't want to be in the same place all the time, in my comfort zone. If I have problems, I don't want to dwell on them kasi they will just make me sad. I want to be surrounded by positive and happy people and that's why the songs I had picked for my album were also positive and happy at walang lungkot-lungkutan kasi parang ‘pag puro emo (songs), it's not okay all the time. I also want to tell people that the message of my songs will remind them to be happy always, that life goes on.”

== Track listing ==
No.	Title	Writer(s)	Producer(s)	Length
1.	"Mr. Right"	Christian Martinez	Christian Martinez	03:21
2.	"Darating Din"	Alemar Neon Constantino Daragosa	Francis Kiko Salazar	03:15
3.	"Wala Man Sa'yo Ang Lahat"	Myrus Apacible	Rox B. Santos	04:47
4.	"Say We Don't Care"	Francis Kiko Salazar	Francis Kiko Salazar	03:10
5.	"Someday (Crazy Love)"	Christian Martinez	Christian Martinez	03:20
6.	"Express Yourself" (Rap Part-Jug HoneyLuv and Bebe Riz)	Roque "Rox" Santos	Rox B. Santos	03:07
7.	"Mr. Right (Minus One)"	Christian Martinez	Christian Martinez	03:22
8.	"Darating Din (Minus One)"	Alemar Neon Constantino Daragosa	Francis Kiko Salazar	03:15
9.	"Wala Man Sa'Yo Ang Lahat (Minus One)"	Myrus Apacible	Rox B. Santos	4:47
10.	"Say We Don't Care (Minus One)"	Francis Kiko Salazar	Francis Kiko Salazar	03:10
11.	"Someday (Crazy Love) (Minus One)"	Christian Martinez	Christian Martinez	03:20
12.	"Express Yourself (Minus One)"	Roque "Rox" Santos	Rox B. Santos	03:05
Total length:				0:40:40

== Singles ==
=== Mr. Right ===
"Mr. Right" was the album's lead single about "finding the right partner" written by Christian Martinez. It was released on April 3, 2015, in radio airplay at MOR 101.9 and made available at digital download at iTunes. The music video was released on Star Music's YouTube page on April 26, 2015. It was directed by Christian Escolano and features Xian Lim, Edward Benosa and Fifth Pagotan in cameo appearances. It was filmed at the Vanilla Cupcake Bakery in Manila where Chiu also held her grand album launch event.

"Darating Din" was the album's second single. "Darating Din" is an upbeat song about "being positive in love by waiting the right time." The music video was released on Star Music's YouTube page on June 15, 2015.

== Commercial performance ==
The album initially sold over 2,500 copies on its first week of release giving it a gold certification. On June 15, 2015, the album was certified platinum for selling over 15,000 copies. Chiu received the Gold and Platinum awards on ASAP 20 during that day. Its lead single "Mr. Right" was also awarded as the No.1 song in the Philippines.

== Certifications ==
Country	Provider	Certification	Sales
Philippines	PARI	Platinum	PHL sales: 15,000

== Release history ==
Country	Edition	Release date	Label
Philippines	Digital download	April 27, 2015	Star Records
Philippines	CD	April 27, 2015	Star Records
