= Xian Lim =

American and Filipino actor (born 1989)

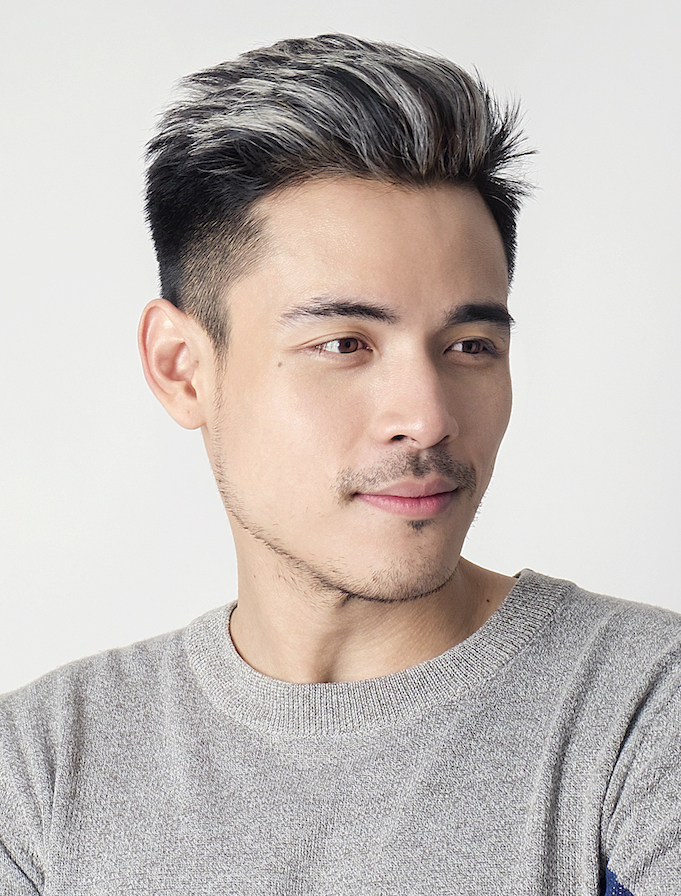
- Lim in 2018
- Born: Alexander Xian Cruz Lim-Uy (Note: Xian Lim was born in the United States. Thus, he does not possess his mother's maiden name which is Cruz.); July 12, 1989 (age 37); San Francisco, California, U.S.
- Citizenship: United States; Philippines
- Occupations: Actor; director; television host
- Years active: 2008–present
- Agent(s): Star Magic (2008–2018); Viva Artists Agency (since 2018); Sparkle GMA Artist Center (since 2021)

Alexander Xian Lim-Uy (Tagalog: [ˈsijɐn lim]; born July 12, 1989) (Note: Chinese: 王班; pinyin: Wáng Bān) is a Filipino actor, director and television host. He has been an exclusive actor of GMA Network and GMA Pictures since 2021. Lim was a contract artist of Star Magic from 2008 to 2017, then he signed a contract with Viva Artists Agency in January 2018. He is best known for his roles on the television series My Binondo Girl (2011), Ina, Kapatid, Anak (2012–13), and The Story of Us (2016), and the films The Reunion (2012), Bakit Hindi Ka Crush ng Crush Mo? (2013), Bride for Rent (2014), and Everything About Her (2016). Since 2012, Lim has hosted several major televised events, particularly Binibining Pilipinas (Miss Philippines) annually and Miss Grand International in Vietnam in 2017.

== Early life ==
Born in San Francisco, California, Lim and his family moved back to Manila, Philippines six months after his birth. Following his parents' separation, he (age 10) and his mother relocated to Daly City, California. Raised by his mother, a former model turned piano teacher, resulted in Lim learning various musical instruments including piano, trombone, saxophone and guitar. He later joined a symphonic band before graduating high school at age 18. He briefly studied psychology at Skyline College in San Bruno, California, until moving to the Philippines to attend college as a basketball varsity scholar at the University of the East in Manila. However, he never played in the UAAP as he had to undergo two years of residency.

Before attaining a degree, he became involved with modeling, and eventually, acting.

== Acting career ==
Lim was cast in a few minor roles before landing a supporting role in Katorse in 2009.

In 2010, he was part of the cast in the drama Rubi as Luis Navarro. Then, he guest starred in 100 Days to Heaven as Jojo Villanueva. He was a guest judge on Showtime and had one-episode appearances for Midnight DJ, Maalaala Mo Kaya, Wansapanataym and Your Song Presents: Andi. In 2011, after a special participation in Minsan Lang Kita Iibigin portraying the young Joaquin del Tierro, he landed his first major lead role in My Binondo Girl top-billed by Kim Chiu. The romantic-comedy television drama was a nationwide success, garnering an average household TV rating of 28.2% provided by Kantar Media/TNS.

In early 2012, Lim signed a three-picture contract with Star Cinema and appeared in the film, My Cactus Heart. In the same year, he starred in a youth-oriented movie with Enchong Dee, Enrique Gil and Kean Cipriano, entitled The Reunion. He was also back in primetime through the teleserye drama Ina, Kapatid, Anak with Kim Chiu, Maja Salvador and Enchong Dee. He also released his debut studio album So It's You under Star Records which reached a Gold Record status.

In 2013, his film Bakit Hindi Ka Crush Ng Crush Mo? with his onscreen and offscreen partner Kim Chiu earned Php 10.5 million in the first day of film showing alone, consequentially surpassing the P100 million mark at the box office for the year 2013 in three weeks time. From the outstanding box office sales, the pair obtained the nickname as the newest blockbuster royalties of their generation.

In 2014, his second movie with Kim Chiu entitled Bride for Rent earned a whopping Php 21.2M on its first day and Php 100M in just 4 days. The movie eventually grossed Php 326,958,423 during its whole run in theaters which validated the KimXi tandem's box office draw.

From 2015 to 2017, he has starred in a succession of roles, starting with his voice over for the Filipino release of Paddington, as well as leading and supporting film credits in All You Need Is Pag-ibig (2015), Everything About Her (2016) and Sin Island (2018).

After Lim signed a contract with Viva Artists Agency months after his contract with Star Magic expired in mid-2017. He signed an exclusive contract with GMA Network in 2021.

== Other work ==
=== Directing ===
Lim's directorial debut was Tabon, which premiered at the Cinemalaya 2019. In 2022, Xian Lim directed an episode of Wish Ko Lang. In 2023, he released his first commercial film Hello, Universe!.

=== Activism ===
Lim has participated in various charity games including annual birthday events at local missions foundations, performing at benefit concerts, an event in Iloilo under Star Magic and San Juan City for the victims of Typhoon Sendong. In August 2012, he and Kim Chiu spearheaded a relief operation in Marikina for the city's flood-affected victims.

During 2013, Lim joined the PETA Free Mali campaign along with Kim Chiu. Lim made a video plea for Mali asking that she be moved to a sanctuary for the sake of her well-being.

=== Basketball ===
Lim played for the amateur basketball club Mandaluyong El Tigre in the 2018–2019 MPBL season.

== Personal life ==
Lim actively promotes living a healthy lifestyle and his interests include filmmaking, traveling and sports. He is a self-professed health-buff, enjoys activities like running and exercises, with further intentions to someday joining a triathlon.

In 2011, Xian began courting fellow Star Magic artist and leading lady Kim Chiu. Lim and Chiu began dating in 2012, which was confirmed in a 2013 episode of Kris TV. On November 15, 2018, Kim Chiu confirmed her relationship with Lim in an interview on Tonight with Boy Abunda. On December 23, 2023, both Chiu and Lim confirmed their break up. In an Esquire Magazine cover interview, Lim confirmed that he is in a relationship with Iris Lee.

In 2025, Lim earned his private pilot licence and epaulette from Topflite Academy in Pasay.

== Filmography ==
=== Film ===
Year	Title	Role	Notes
2010	Mamarazzi	Oscar	Supporting role
2010	Two Funerals	Gerry	Lead role
2012	My Cactus Heart	Bene	Lead role
2012	The Reunion	Joaquin "Joax" Perez	Lead role
2013	Bakit Hindi Ka Crush Ng Crush Mo?	Francisco Alejandro "Alex" Prieto	Lead role
2014	Bride for Rent	Roderico "Rocco" Espiritu Jr.	Lead role
2014	Past Tense	Bobby "Babs" Razon	Lead role
2015	Paddington	Paddington Bear (voice)	Lim replaced Ben Whishaw as the voice actor for the Philippine release
2015	Must Date the Playboy	Zachary "Zach" Andres	Lead role (mobile series)
2015	All You Need Is Pag-Ibig	Dino	Lead role
2016	Everything About Her	Albert Mitra	Lead role
2017	Dear Other Self	Henry	Lead role
2018	Sin Island	David Santiago	Lead role
2018	Corpus Delicti	Mark Mondejar	Lead role
2018	Paddington 2	Paddington Bear (voice)	Lim replaced Ben Whishaw as the voice actor for the Philippine release
2018	Miss Granny	Lorenz	Main Role
2019	Hanggang Kailan?	Donnie	Lead role
2020	Untrue	Joaquim	Lead role
2020	Love the Way U Lie	Nathan	Lead role
2022	Yorme: The Isko Domagoso Story	Adult Francisco "Scott/Isko/Yorme" Moreno Domagoso	Main Role
2022	Bahay na Pula		Main Role
2022	Always	Lino	Main Role
2023	Hello Universe		Director
2024	Playtime	Lucas	
2024	Kuman Thong		Director

=== Television ===
Year	Title	Role	Notes
2008	My Girl	Photographer	Cameo appearance
2008–2009	Your Song Presents: My Only Hope	Enrico "Rick" Alejandro	Supporting role
2009–2010	Katorse	Albert Arcangel	Lead role
2010	Midnight DJ	Luis	"JS Prom Nightmare" episode
2010	Maynila	Marc	"Makinig Ka, Puso" episode
2010	Maynila	Lance	"Hunky and Virile" episode
2010–2021	ASAP	Himself	Co-host / performer
2010	Rubi	Luis Navarro / Luis N. Ferrer	Extended role
2010	Agimat: Ang Mga Alamat ni Ramon Revilla: Elias Paniki	Gabriel	Supporting role
2010	Midnight DJ	Jake	"Bulong ng Demonyo" episode
2010	Maalaala Mo Kaya	Mark	"Marriage Contract" episode
2010	Wansapanataym	Aris	"Bandanang Itim" episode
2010	Your Song Presents: Andi	Ralph	"Tell Me" episode
2011	Minsan Lang Kita Iibigin	Young Joaquin Del Tierro	Special participation
2011	Yamaha Yey	Himself	Co-host
2011	100 Days to Heaven	Jojo Villanueva	Guest role
2011–2012	My Binondo Girl	Andrew "Andy" Wu	Lead role
2012–2013	Ina, Kapatid, Anak	William "Liam" Lagdameo	Lead role
2012–2014	I-Shine Talent Camp TV Seasons 1, 2 and 3	Himself	Host
2014	Maalaala Mo Kaya	Maynard	"Gitara" episode
2014	Maalaala Mo Kaya	Johnny Medrano	"Saklay" episode
2015	Ryan Ryan Musikahan: Piyano at Gitara	Himself	Guest performer
2016	The Story of Us	Ferdinand "Macoy" Sandoval	Lead role
2016	Maalaala Mo Kaya	Raymond	"DJ" episode
2016	Doowee Hooper Beat Band Competition Season 3	Himself	Host
2016	Maalaala Mo Kaya	Gabby	"Medical Result" episode
2017	A Love to Last	Sebastian "Totoy" Cruz	Special participation
2017	Maalaala Mo Kaya	Randy	"Kwek-kwek" episode
2019	Maalaala Mo Kaya	Bill Felisan	"Youth Citizen" episode
2020	Love Thy Woman	David Chao	Main role
2021	1000 Heartbeats: Pintig Pinoy	Himself	Host
2022	False Positive	Edward Dela Guardia	Lead role
2022; 2023	All-Out Sundays	Himself	Guest Performer
2023	Hearts on Ice	Lawrence "Enzo" Razon	Main role
2024	Love. Die. Repeat.	Bernardo "Bernard" Yuzon	Main role

=== Digital ===
Year	Title	Role	Notes
2021	Parang Kayo Pero Hindi	Joaquin Escribo	Lead role

== Discography ==
=== Studio albums ===
Album	Year	Label	Status
So It's You	2012	Star Music	Platinum
XL2	2014	Star Music	
Key of X	2017	Star Music	

=== Singles ===
TV series	Song	Year	Label
My Binondo Girl theme song	"Ako'y Sayo Lamang"	2011	Star Music
Aryana theme song	"Iibigin Kita"	2012	Star Music
Ina, Kapatid, Anak soundtrack	"Kung Di Sa 'Iyo" (Liam and Celyn theme song)	2012	Star Music
Ina, Kapatid, Anak soundtrack	"Alay Ko Sayo" (Liam and Celyn theme song)	2012	Star Music

=== Concerts ===
Title	Date
A Date with Xian	July 9, 2016
Songs in the Key of X	July 15, 2017
Stronger Together: GMA Pinoy TV @ Expo Dubai 2020 Concert	March 30, 2022

== Awards, nominations and recognitions ==
Awards and Nomination
Year	Award giving body	Category	Nominated work	Result
2011	27th PMPC Star Awards for Movies	New Movie Actor of the Year	Two Funerals	Nominated
2012	Yahoo! OMG! Philippines Awards	Breakthrough Actor of the Year	My Binondo Girl	Won
2012	Yahoo! OMG! Philippines Awards	Love team of the Year (shared with Kim Chiu)	My Binondo Girl	Won
2012	43rd GMMSF Box-Office Entertainment Awards	Most Promising Actor of the Year	My Binondo Girl	Nominated
2012	ASAP Pop Viewers' Choice Awards	Pop Pin-up Boy	—N/a	Won
2012	ASAP 7th 24K Gold Awards	24K Male Gold Awardee	So Its You	Won
2012	26th PMPC Star Awards for TV	Best Talent Search Program Host (shared with Dimples Romana and Matteo Guidicelli)	Promil Pre-School I-Shine Talent Camp	Nominated
2013	61st FAMAS Awards	German Moreno Youth Achievement Award	—N/a	Won
2013	8th Myx Music Awards	Favorite Myx Celebrity VJ	—N/a	Nominated
2013	Yahoo! OMG! Philippines Award	Love Team of the Year (shared with Kim Chiu)	Ina Kapatid Anak	Won
2013	Yes! Magazine	100 Most Beautiful Stars (Primetime Category)	—N/a	Included
2013	5th PMPC Star Awards for Music	New Male Recording Artist of the Year	So It's You	Nominated
2013	27th PMPC Star Awards for TV	Best Talent Search Program Host (shared with Dimples Romana and Matteo Guidicelli)	Promil Pre-School I-Shine Talent Camp	Nominated
2013	ASAP Pop Viewers' Choice Awards	Pop Love Team (shared with Kim Chiu)	Bakit Hindi Ka Crush Ng Crush Mo?	Won
2014	62nd FAMAS Awards	Best Actor	Bakit Hindi Ka Crush Ng Crush Mo?	Nominated
2014	1st PEP List Awards	Fab Star (Male)	—N/a	Won
2014	1st PEP List Awards	Celebrity Pair of the Year (shared with Kim Chiu)	Bride for Rent	Won
2014	Yes! Magazine	100 Most Beautiful Stars (Blockbuster King category)	Bride for Rent	Won
2014	6th PMPC Star Awards for Music	Male Pop Artist of the Year	XL2	Nominated
2014	4th EdukCircle Awards	Most Influential Film Actor	Bride for Rent	Won
2014	28th PMPC Star Awards for TV	Best Talent Search Program Host (shared with Dimples Romana and Matteo Guidicelli)	Promil Pre-School I-Shine Talent Camp	Nominated
2014	27th Aliw Awards	Best Emcee (Male)	—N/a	Nominated
2014	10th ASAP Pop Viewers' Choice Awards	Pop Male Artist	XL2	Won
2014	10th ASAP Pop Viewers' Choice Awards	Pop Album	XL2	Nominated
2014	10th ASAP Pop Viewers' Choice Awards	Pop Song	Pag May Time	Nominated
2014	10th ASAP Pop Viewers' Choice Awards	Pop Coverboy	—N/a	Won
2014	10th ASAP Pop Viewers' Choice Awards	Pop Selfie	—N/a	Nominated
2014	10th ASAP Pop Viewers' Choice Awards	Pop Instagrammer	—N/a	Won
2014	10th ASAP Pop Viewers' Choice Awards	Pop Instavideo	—N/a	Nominated
2014	10th ASAP Pop Viewers' Choice Awards	Pop Screen Kiss (shared with Kim Chiu)	Bride for Rent	Won
2014	10th ASAP Pop Viewers' Choice Awards	Pop Loveteam (shared with Kim Chiu)	Bride for Rent	Nominated
2014	10th ASAP Pop Viewers' Choice Awards	Pop Movie (shared with Kim Chiu)	Bride for Rent	Won
2015	10th Myx Music Awards	Favorite Myx Celebrity VJ	—N/a	Nominated
2015	46th GMMSF Box-Office Entertainment Awards 2015	Prince of Philippine Movies & TV	Bride for Rent	Won
2015	2nd PEP List Awards	Fab Star of the Year (Male)	—N/a	Won
2015	2nd PEP List Awards	Celebrity Pair of the Year (shared with Kim Chiu)	—N/a	Won
2016	6th EdukCircle Awards	Best Drama Actor	The Story of Us	Won
2016	30th PMPC Star Awards for TV	Best Drama Actor	The Story of Us	Nominated
2016	30th PMPC Star Awards for TV	German Moreno Power Tandem (with Kim Chiu)	N/A	Won
2017	1st GEMS (Guild of Educators, Mentors and Students) Awards	Best Supporting Actor	Everything About Her	Won
2017	15th Gawad Tanglaw	Best Supporting Actor	Everything About Her	Won
2017	1st EDDYS Entertainment Editors Awards	Best Supporting Actor	Everything About Her	Nominated
2017	33rd Star Awards for Movies	Movie Supporting Actor of the Year	Everything About Her	Won
2017	31st PMPC Star Awards for TV	Best Single Performance by an Actor	Maalaala Mo Kaya: "Kwek-Kwek" Episode	Nominated
2017	Aliw Awards 2017	Best Major Concert (Male)	Songs in the Key of X	Nominated
2018	34th Star Awards for Movies	Movie Supporting Actor of the Year	Dear Other Self	Nominated
2018	34th Star Awards for Movies	Male Star of the Night	Dear Other Self	Won
2020	2nd VP Choice Awards	TV Actor of the Year	Love Thy Woman	Won
