= Linlang (2023 TV series) =

Philippine thriller drama television series

- Mid-season Promotional poster
- Genre: Thriller drama; Action; Mystery; Romance; Soap opera
- Written by: David Diuco
- Directed by: FM Reyes; Jojo A. Saguin
- Starring: Paulo Avelino; Kim Chiu; JM de Guzman; Maricel Soriano
- Composers: Jovinor Tan; Jonathan Manalo; Len Calvo; Adriane Macalipay
- Country of origin: Philippines
- Original language: Filipino
- No. of episodes: 14 (Prime Video); 103 (The Teleserye Version); (list of episodes)

Production
- Executive producers: Carlo Katigbak; Cory Vidanes; Laurenti Dyogi; Roldeo Endrinal
- Camera setup: Single-camera
- Running time: 56–61 minutes
- Production company: Dreamscape Entertainment

Original release
- Network: Amazon Prime Video
- Release: October 5 – November 16, 2023
- Network: Kapamilya Channel (cable and satellite TV only) (Note: The series also aired on A2Z, TV5, Jeepney TV and TFC. It was also available for streaming via Kapamilya Online Live and on-demand via iWantTFC.)
- Release: January 22 – June 14, 2024

Linlang (International title: Deceit) is a Philippine pre-produced mystery thriller drama television series produced by Dreamscape Entertainment. Directed by FM Reyes and Jojo Saguin, it stars Paulo Avelino, Kim Chiu, JM de Guzman and Maricel Soriano. The series streamed on Amazon Prime Video from October 5 to November 16, 2023. The extended version of the series, titled Linlang: The Teleserye Version, aired on Kapamilya Channel's Primetime Bida evening block from January 22 to June 14, 2024.

== Premise ==
The story centers around a husband's investigation into his wife's affair as he learns more about the situation and comes to the conclusion that his wife's infidelity is not the only factor at play.

== Cast and characters ==
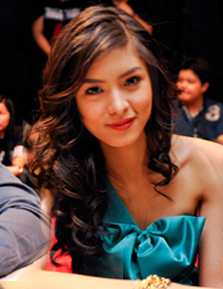
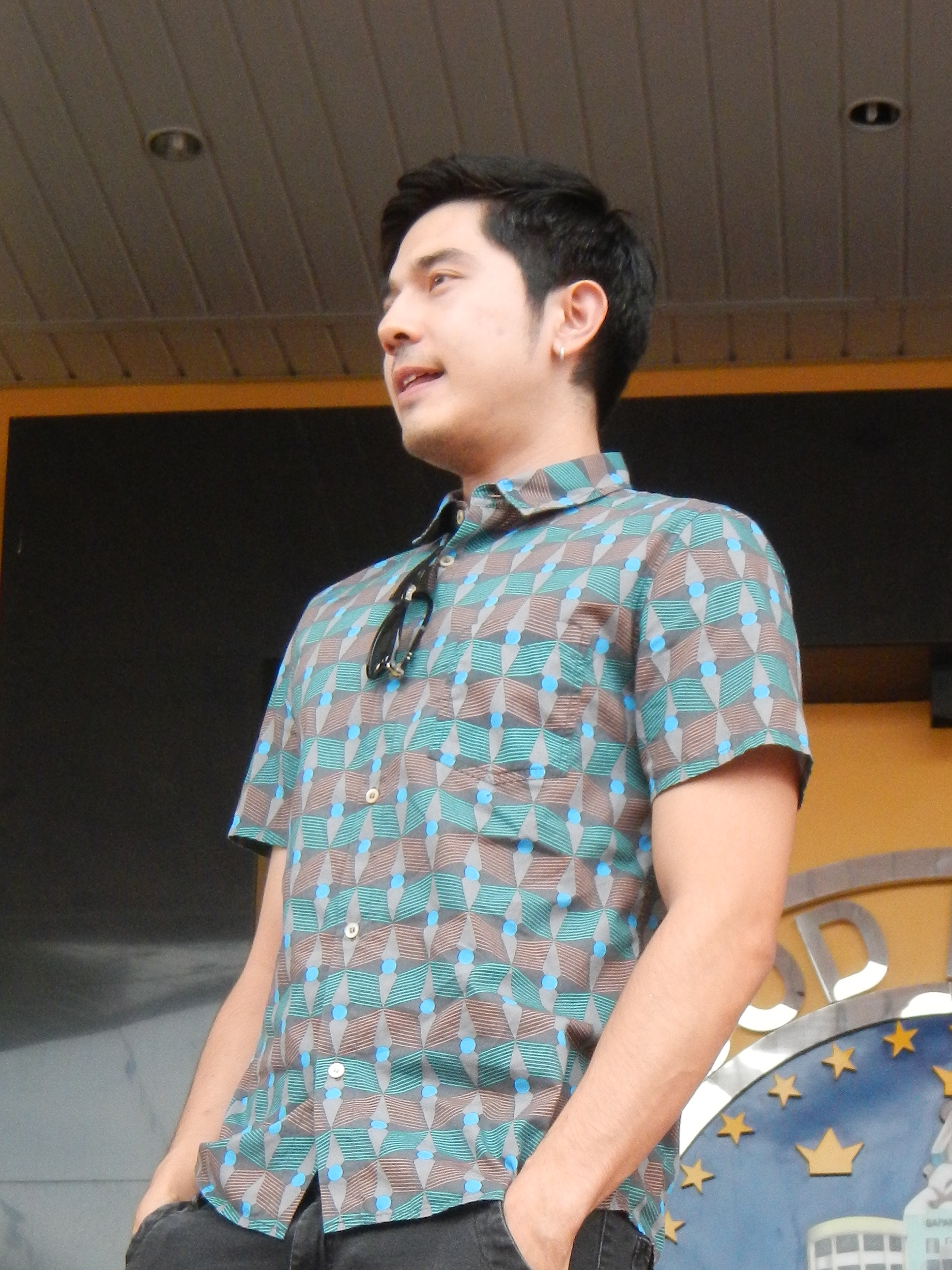
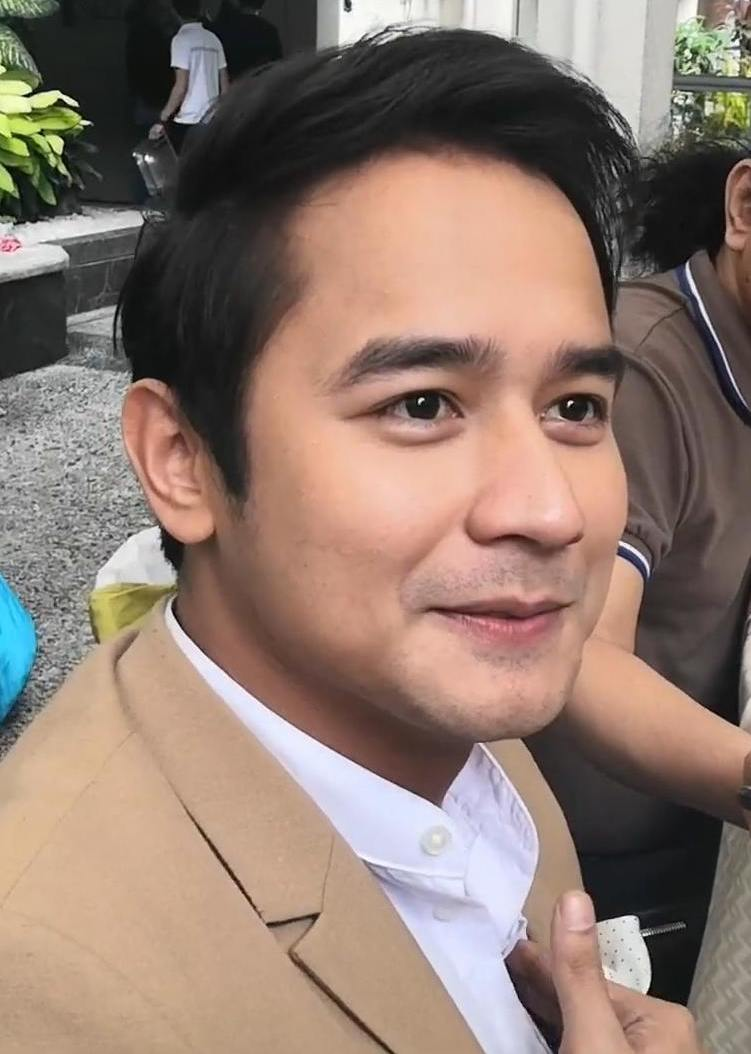
From left to right: Kim Chiu, Paulo Avelino, JM de Guzman

=== Main cast ===
- Paulo Avelino as Victor Lualhati
- Kim Chiu as Juliana Alcantara-Lualhati
- JM de Guzman as Alexander "Alex" Lualhati
- Maricel Soriano as Amelia Contreras-Lualhati

=== Supporting cast ===
- Jaime Fabregas as Badong Castillo
- Ruby Ruiz as Pilar Alcantara
- Raymond Bagatsing as Emilio Mendoza
- Kaila Estrada as Sylvia Villamayor-Lualhati
- Heaven Peralejo as Olivia Castillo-Lualhati
- Albie Casiño as Ricardo "Ricky" Torres
- Benj Manalo as Jimboy Ulambay
- Race Matias as Matteo Bautista
- Anji Salvacion as Kate Alcantara
- Kice So as Dylan Salazar
- Heart Ramos as Abigail "Abby" Lualhati
  - Hanna Lexie as young Abby

=== Recurring cast ===
- Bart Guingona as Dante Villamayor
- Adrian Lindayag as William
- Frenchie Dy as Mema
- Ross Pesigan as Bogs
- Connie Virtucio
- Lotlot Bustamante as Mosang
- Meanne Espinosa

=== Guest cast ===
- Jake Ejercito as Lucas
- Mark McMahon as Eric
- Lovely Abella as Emma
- Daniela Stranner as Maricar
- Sandy Aloba
- Danny Ramos as Jessie Lualhati
- Daisy Cariño as Olivia's mother

== Production ==
Linlang was first announced in October 2022 by Dreamscape Entertainment. Principal photography for the series lasted for six months. Lead star Paulo Avelino prepared for his role by "pushing himself through a body transformation to embody his character’s journey", stating that he "had to gain around 20 lb (9.1 kg) to 35 lb (16 kg) at the start of the filming and lose around 20 pounds (9.1 kilograms) midway into the shoot."

== Marketing ==
The official trailer of the series was released on September 24, 2023. The following month, advance screening for the series was held at Cinema76 in Quezon City. To promote the series, the cast appeared in the noontime musical-variety show ASAP. Chiu and De Guzman also appeared in the talk show Magandang Buhay.

== Release ==
The series was released on the streaming service Amazon Prime Video on October 5, 2023, with the first two episodes available immediately and the rest debuting on a weekly basis. Its uncut version called Linlang: The Teleserye Version premiered on Kapamilya Channel, A2Z, TV5, Jeepney TV and The Filipino Channel on January 22, 2024. It was also available for streaming via Kapamilya Online Live and iWantTFC. With this, it is the second series to release both cut and extended versions, after 2009–2010; 2012–2013's May Bukas Pa from the late 2000s to early 2010s.

== Music ==
The main theme song of the series is a 2023 version of "Anong Nangyari Sa Ating Dalawa" performed by Erik Santos. The instrumental version of this song was also featured on the "EXpecially For You" segment of the noontime variety show It's Showtime.

== Reception ==
=== Ratings and viewership ===
Upon release, Linlang debuted at No. 1 on Amazon Prime Video Philippines. The series also opened with 367,069 concurrent live viewers during its premiere on Kapamilya Online Live through the streaming service YouTube. According to Nielsen NUTAM People Survey, the pilot episode of Linlang: The Teleserye Version received a nationwide rating of 9.0%. The series registered its highest national rating on June 13 and 14, garnering 12.0%, the latter date being the finale episode.

=== Critical response ===
Writing for Daily Tribune, Alwin Ignacio described Linlang as "a cautionary tale and modern-day morality check." He praised the acting performances of the lead stars Kim Chiu, Paulo Avelino and JM de Guzman, as well as the portrayals of Maricel Soriano, Kaila Estrada and Ruby Ruiz.

== Accolades ==
Accolades received by Linlang
Year	Award	Category	Nominee(s)	Result	Ref.
2024	ContentAsia Awards	Best Female Lead in a TV Programme / Series	Kim Chiu	Nominated	
2024	ContentAsia Awards	Best Supporting Actress in a TV Programme / Series	Kaila Estrada	Nominated	
2024	Gawad Pasado Awards	Best TV Actor	Paulo Avelino	Won	
2025	PMPC Star Awards for Television	Best Primetime Drama Series	Linlang	Nominated	
2025	PMPC Star Awards for Television	Best Drama Actor	Paulo Avelino	Nominated	
2025	PMPC Star Awards for Television	Best Drama Actress	Kim Chiu	Won	
2025	PMPC Star Awards for Television	Best Drama Supporting Actress	Kaila Estrada	Won	
