= Bawal Lumabas (The Classroom Song) =

Single by Kim Chiu
- Released: May 25, 2020
- Recorded: 2020
- Genre: Pop
- Length: 2:58
- Label: StarPop
- Songwriters: Kim Chiu; Adrian Crisanto; Squammy Beats
- Producers: Squammy Beats (Beat and Track); Jonathan Manalo (Overall Production)

Kim Chiu singles chronology
"Wag Kang Bumitaw" (2020)	"Bawal Lumabas (The Classroom Song)" (2020)	"Kimmi" (2021)

Lyric video
- "Bawal Lumabas" on YouTube

"Bawal Lumabas (The Classroom Song)" or simply "Bawal Lumabas" (transl. You can't go out) is a single by Filipina actress and recording artist Kim Chiu. The chorus of the song came from her statement during the livestream event "Laban Kapamilya" as she tried to compare ABS-CBN shutdown to classroom rules. Her comparison became confusing and incoherent instead.

The song was released on May 25, 2020, under the StarPop label.

== Background and release ==
Due to the expiration of ABS-CBN's congressional franchise on May 4, 2020, the National Telecommunications Commission (NTC) and Solicitor General Jose Calida issued a cease-and-desist order on the next day, demanding the network to immediately cease all of its free-to-air broadcast operations. With that, several Kapamilya actors and actresses expressed their dismay regarding the shutdown of the network through online livestreaming. One of those livestreams was the "Laban, Kapamilya!" event on May 8 through Facebook Live sessions where Kim Chiu accidentally made a confusing comparison of the law and the ABS-CBN shutdown to classroom dynamics.

Sa classroom may batas, bawal lumabas, Pero ‘pag sinabi, ‘pag nag-comply ka na bawal na lumabas pero may ginawa ka sa pinagbabawal nila, inayos mo ‘yong law ng classroom niyo at sinubmit mo ulit ay pwede na pala ikaw lumabas.

English translation

"In the classroom, there's a rule: you cannot go out. But if they say you can't go out, and you comply, but then you do something about the things they prohibit, you fix the rules of your classroom and resubmit them, then you are allowed to go out."

The next day, Chiu posted in her Instagram account that even she herself did not understand her "classroom" statement. Nonetheless, her statement snowballed into a massive deal. Different kinds of internet memes were born, including the one with a beat created by Squammy Beats in which Chiu's statement was auto-tuned. The version made by Squammy has been used heavily in several TikTok videos.

For several days, Chiu stayed away from social media as she became a laughingstock online. While friends checked up on Chiu at the height of the meme's spread, it was one stranger's open letter on Facebook that made a mark on the actress. The open letter came from Adrian Crisanto, a marketing professional. Crisanto suggested Chiu to record the "remix" of her video statement that had gone viral, spawning its own classical and rock covers, as well as a TikTok dance challenge. Eventually, Chiu, Crisanto, and original beat creator Squammy Beats collaborated for the "remix" became a full track.

The full version of "Bawal Lumabas" premiered in Chiu's YouTube account on May 18, 2020. After a week, the song was released to Apple Music and Spotify for digital download and online streaming.

== Track listing ==
Digital download
No.	Title	Length
1.	"Bawal Lumabas"	2:58

Digital download – Brian Cua Summer Anthem Remix
No.	Title	Length
1.	"Bawal Lumabas - Classroom Song (Brian Cua Summer Anthem Remix)"	3:32

== Criticism by Rodante Marcoleta ==
On May 26, 2020, during the first hearing for ABS-CBN's franchise renewal application, Sagip Party-list Rep. Rodante Marcoleta, member of the religious organization Iglesia ni Cristo, attributed his objections against renewing ABS-CBN's franchise for 25 years, stating the network committed their violations. Marcoleta used the line to hit out the network.

"Mr. Speaker, my distinguished colleagues, hindi po nagcomply sa batas ang ABS-CBN, kaya hindi po pwede sila lumabas at magpalabas." (English translation: "Mr. Speaker, my distinguished colleagues, ABS-CBN did not comply with the law, therefore they cannot go on air or broadcast.")

The netizens expressed dismay on Marcoleta, pointing out the move was completely irrelevant. Marcoleta is one of the 70 representatives who voted "yes" to deny the renewal of ABS-CBN's franchise.

== Bawal Lumabas: The Series (2020) ==
Bawal Lumabas: The Series (International title: Her Rules, Her No's), is a Philippine romantic comedy television miniseries released online via iWantTFC from December 14–19, 2020.

=== Cast and characters ===
- Kim Chiu as Emerald Tesoro
- Francine Diaz as Jade Tesoro
- Kyle Echarri as Kevin Ramos
- Rafael Rosell as Jonathan "Jonjon" Palma
- Paulo Angeles as Onyx Tesoro
- Trina Legaspi as Ruby Tesoro
- Paeng Sudayan as Papa Pol
- Giselle Sanchez as Kap Cheska
