= I've Fallen for You =

- Theatrical movie poster
- Directed by: Lino Cayetano
- Screenplay by: Mel Mendoza-del Rosario
- Story by: Francis Bryan Lua; Mel Mendoza-del Rosario; Chie E. Floresca
- Produced by: Charo Santos-Concio; Malou N. Santos
- Starring: Kim Chiu; Gerald Anderson
- Cinematography: Eli Balce
- Edited by: Marya Ignacio
- Music by: Raul Mitra
- Distributed by: Star Cinema
- Release date: September 26, 2007
- Country: Philippines
- Language: Filipino
- Box office: ₱35,917,446.00

I've Fallen for You is a 2007 Philippine romantic film. This is the first solo film of Gerald Anderson and Kim Chiu after Sana Maulit Muli ended on April 20 five months later and they were also from First Day High, which premiered on September 27, 2006 a year later.

== Plot ==
The The list of UPCAT passers is released, revealing that “Alex Reyes” has passed. The news causes both a boy and a girl to celebrate. At an anime costume competition, the host announces that “Alex Reyes” has won the grand prize. A boy and a girl rush from opposite sides of the venue to claim the prize, only to discover that they share the same name.

Alex Boy (Gerald Anderson) returns to the Philippines from Singapore with his mother, Tessa (Chin Chin Gutierrez). Because his father's job at a multinational company has taken the family to different parts of the world, Alex has never had a place he could call home. He struggles to commit to anything, frequently taking up new hobbies but abandoning them before completing them. When he learns that his parents are separating, Alex becomes determined to achieve what he has always wanted: to settle in one place and live together with his family.

Alex Girl (Kim Chiu) has set goals for herself and her family. She hopes to enter the University of the Philippines and eventually find a job to help support her struggling family. The inn and restaurant owned by her parents, Jonathan (Albert Martinez) and Vangie (Lotlot de Leon), is doing poorly, while their constant arguments further strain the family. With little time for anything else, Alex Girl focuses on finding ways to earn money, believing that financial stability may bring the peace she wants for her family.

Alex Boy sees Alex Girl as the ideal partner for a tandem cycling competition he wants to enter. Desperate to secure money for her studies, Alex Girl agrees to team up with her annoying namesake after learning that the competition's prize is ₱50,000. Although she is a talented cyclist, she lacks the technical skills needed to compete effectively. As Alex Boy teaches her the techniques she needs, he learns from her determination and sense of responsibility. In turn, he helps Alex Girl rediscover the importance of having fun.

Two young hearts find company and comfort in each other. As they decide to nurture their young love, fate challenges them to leap over the greatest challenge their love story would ever face; the story of their own families’ past.

== Cast ==
=== Main cast ===
- Kim Chiu as Alex Tamayo Reyes
- Gerald Anderson as Alex Tamano Reyes

=== Supporting cast ===
- Albert Martinez as Jonathan Reyes
- Lotlot de Leon as Vangie Tamayo Reyes
- Chin Chin Gutierrez as Tessa Tamano Reyes
- Ketchup Eusebio
- Amy Perez as Ninang Beth
- Lloyd Samartino as Randy Reyes
- Miles Ocampo as Angel
- Alex Gonzaga as Samantha

== Soundtrack ==
The official soundtrack, 'I've Fallen for You, is covered by Toni Gonzaga, which was originally sung by Jamie Rivera.

== Reception ==
Despite having strong marketing and wide distribution, I've Fallen for You failed to open at number 1 in the Philippine box-office with sales of P13,988,751 (63 screens), far behind Resident Evil: Extinction with P17,680,244 (51 screens). 'I've Fallen for You' eventually grossed a grand total of P35,917,446.

Chiu and Anderson were announced as the "Most Popular Loveteam" by the Guillermo Mendoza Memorial Scholarship Foundation.

== See also ==
- List of highest-grossing films in the Philippines
