= The Healing (film) =

2012 horror film by Chito S. Roño

- Theatrical release poster
- Directed by: Chito S. Roño
- Screenplay by: Roy C. Iglesias
- Story by: Chito S. Roño; Roy C. Iglesias
- Produced by: Charo Santos-Concio; Malou N. Santos
- Starring: Vilma Santos; Kim Chiu
- Cinematography: Charlie Peralta
- Edited by: Jerrold Tarog
- Music by: Jerrold Tarog
- Production company: Star Cinema
- Distributed by: ABS-CBN Film Productions
- Release date: July 25, 2012
- Running time: 107 minutes
- Country: Philippines
- Language: Filipino
- Box office: ₱104.6 million

The Healing is a 2012 Filipino supernatural horror film directed by Chito S. Roño from a story concept he co-created with Roy C. Iglesias, who solely wrote the screenplay, with editing and music compositions by Jerrold Tarog. The film stars Vilma Santos and Kim Chiu, with the supporting cast includes Janice de Belen, Pokwang, Robert Arevalo, and Martin del Rosario.

Produced and distributed by ABS-CBN Film Productions, the film was theatrically released on July 25, 2012, as part of commemorating Santos' 50th year in the entertainment landscape.

== Plot ==
Seth brings her father, Odong, a stroke victim, to Manang Elsa, a faith healer. As they leave, she sees a man waiting in line collapse and taken inside.

The following day, Seth is met by a fully healed Odong. Amazed by his grandfather's recovery, Seth's estranged son Jed asks her to help his half-sister Cookie, who is suffering from glomerulonephritis, with Elsa. Seth gives them the healer's address.

At a party to celebrate her father's recovery, Seth is approached by guests seeking help. Her housekeeper Alma has a growth on her foot that prevented her from migrating abroad; local policeman Ding has psoriasis; neighbor Chona has goiter; another neighbor, Greta, has a lump on her breast; and Cacai, the daughter of Cita, a friend of Seth's, is blind. The group goes to seek Elsa, who cures all of them. On the way home, Seth crosses paths with Jed and Cookie on their way to Elsa.

A few days later, Seth invites Chona to Ding's wedding reception, but Chona just smiles and ignores her. Afterwards, she stabs a bystander and fatally slashes her own neck with a knife. At her wake, Seth learns from Chona's husband, Rex, that she had seen a crow in her dream. The others who were healed speak out about having had similar dreams. The following day, Seth learns that Dodi, another patient of Elsa, went on a killing spree at a gym before killing his partner and himself with a piece of broken glass.

That night, during a blackout, Seth sees Greta in her home. As Seth calls her, Greta looks back by stretching her neck backward. Greta then stabs and decapitates her husband, Ruben, with a machete. Greta then hanged herself after trying to kill her sons. The next day, while on a raid at a motel, Ding starts shooting indiscriminately before being shot by his colleagues.

It turns out that the people Seth saw were doppelgangers, who demonized the images of the people who were healed before their deaths. Seth and Cita go to confront Elsa about the deaths. Her brother Melchor informed them that Elsa was killed by Dario, the man who collapsed when Seth and her father left.

Dario had actually suffered a fatal heart attack at that moment, and Elsa unknowingly "cured" him of his death. Now the life that was used to resurrect him was the life of the patients cured after him. Melchor says the only way to destroy the curse is to kill Dario again.

Seth sets out to warn the others, only to witness a possessed Alma throwing her roommates over a balcony before setting herself ablaze. Fearing for her daughter's life, Cita brings Cacai to a Daoist temple to be guarded by monks. Seth sees Cacai's image and warns Cita. However, she is distracted by a dragon dance and loses Cacai, who is then possessed by her doppelganger. Cacai massacres the monks with a ceremonial axe and impales herself on a flagpole. Seth is then haunted by the ghosts of the victims, who blame her for their deaths. Seth apologizes to Cita, who tells her to save Cookie.

Seth and Jed take Cookie to a safe house. Seth visits Dario in jail. Revealing he is now a different entity, Dario warns Seth that those who have been cured by Elsa will be possessed by their own alter egos. Their souls shall be offered to him unless he is killed, which Seth is reluctant to do. When she returns to Cookie's safe house, she is attacked by her doppelganger, whom she electrocutes with a toaster.

Learning Cookie has been possessed. Jed calls Seth. At her father's birthday party, Seth is visited by a normal-looking Cookie, who kills her houseboy, Boni. As Seth receives Jed's call, Cookie stabs her. Jed arrives and tries to stop Cookie from killing her. But Cookie touches Jed, creating a doppelganger of Jed who then tries to stab Seth. At the prison, Melchor fatally shoots Dario. A crow falls from the sky, ending the curse. An unconscious Cookie is woken up by Seth and Jed.

== Cast ==
=== Main cast ===
- Vilma Santos as Seth
- Kim Chiu as Cookie

=== Supporting cast ===
- Janice de Belen as Cita
- Pokwang as Alma
- Robert Arevalo† as Odong
- Martin del Rosario as Jed
- Mark Gil† as Val
- Carmi Martin as Bles
- Cris Villanueva as Ding
- Allan Paule as Ruben
- Ynez Veneracion as Greta
- Ces Quesada as Chona
- Abby Bautista as Cacai
- Daria Ramirez as Manang Elsa
- Chinggoy Alonzo† as Dodi

=== Guest cast ===
- Simon Ibarra as Rex
- Mon Confiado as Gay Lover
- Cris Pasturan as Boni
- Nikki Valdez as Lani
- Joel Torre as Melchor
- Jhong Hilario as Dario Mata
- Ina Feleo as Mrs. Mata
- Mercedes Cabral as Kell
- Ana Capri as Melchor's Wife
- Dexter Doria as Policewoman

== Release ==
=== International screenings ===
Here are some selected international screening dates and venues of The Healing:

Date	Year	Mall	Location
July 27 – August 2	2012	Micronesia Mall	Guam
August 2–9	2012	Paradise Mall	Papua New Guinea
August 10–16	2012	Pearlridge West Theatres	Hawaii
August 10–16	2012	Regal Village Square Stadium	Las Vegas
August 10–16	2012	UA Horton Plaza	San Diego
August 10–16	2012	Parkway Plaza Stadium 12	Seattle
August 10–16	2012	Clearview Bergenfield Cinemas	New Jersey
August 10–16	2012	Cinemark Tinseltown	Houston
August 16–23	2012	Al Ghuarair	Dubai
August 16–23	2012	Al Mariah Mall	Abu Dhabi
August 16–23	2012	CineCenter	Qatar
August 16–23	2012	Seef Cineplex	Bahrain
August 17–24	2012	Station Square Cineplex	Vancouver

== Reception ==
=== Box office performance ===
According to Box Office Mojo, the film grossed 74 million pesos in its first two weeks. The film grossed P104.6 million. It became the third Filipino film of 2012 to gross over 100 million.

== Ratings ==
The Cinema Evaluation Board of the Philippines gave this film a "Graded A", meaning the film will not pay taxes from the gross revenue of the film earned from the box office.

Star Cinema released two versions of the film, one is the censored, wider release, which is rated R-13 while the other one is director's cut, limited release, which is rated R-18.

== See also ==
- List of ghost films
