= Matteo Guidicelli =

Filipino actor, model and singer (born 1990)

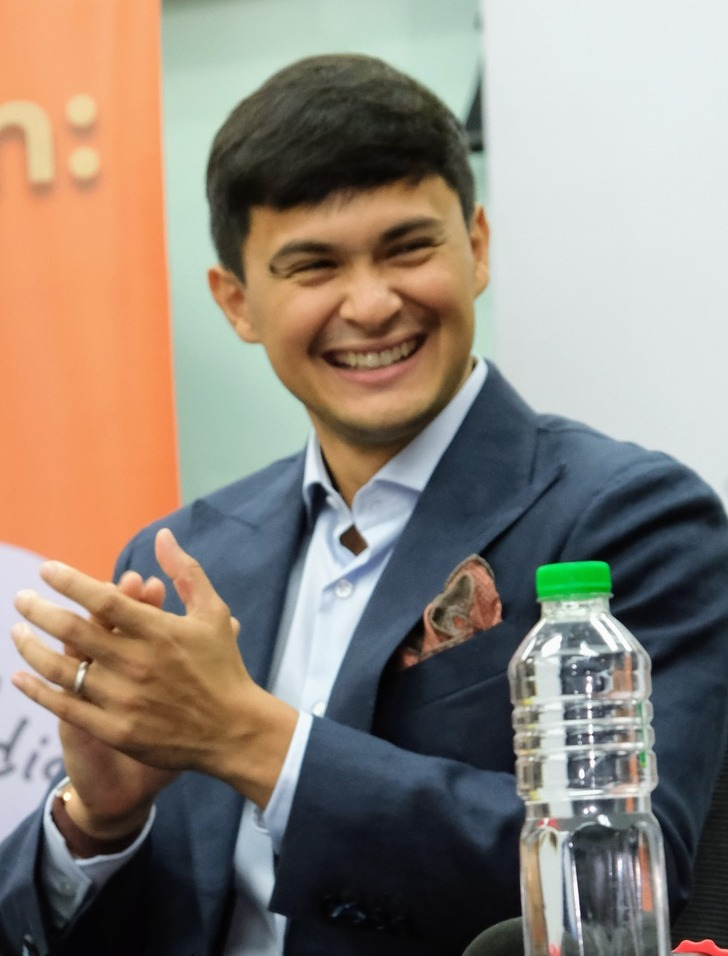
- Guidicelli in 2023
- Born: Gianmatteo Vittorio Fernan Guidicelli; March 26, 1990 (age 36); Cebu City, Philippines
- Education: University of San Jose–Recoletos (BS)
- Occupations: Actor; businessman; model; singer; military officer
- Years active: 2006–present
- Agents: Star Magic (2006–2009; 2010–2019); Viva Artists Agency (2019–present); GMA Public Affairs (2023–present)
- Spouse: Sarah Geronimo (m. 2020)
- Military career
- Allegiance: Philippines
- Branch: Philippine Army; Army Reserve Command
- Service years: 2019–present
- Unit: 1st Scout Ranger Regiment

Gianmatteo Vittorio Fernan Guidicelli (Tagalog pronunciation: [ɡwɪdɪˈtʃeli], born March 26, 1990) is a Filipino actor, businessman, military officer, model, singer and former kart racer.

== Early life and career ==
Matteo Guidicelli was born in Cebu City. He is one of three children of Gianluca Guidicelli, an Italian, and Glenna Fernan, a Filipino. His maternal grandfather is the late Cebu Provincial Prosecutor Vicente "Inting" Fernan, cousin of then Senator and Chief Justice Marcelo Fernan making him Guidicelli's great-uncle.

Guidicelli initially became known through his racing career, having started at an early age of 11. He has won numerous awards including being a three-time winner of the Karter of the Year award.

Guidicelli took an interest in acting after taking workshops at the New York Academy of Art. As soon as he came back to the Philippines, he took theatre courses at Brent International School and began to participate in plays. He also attended Columbia College in Chicago for two years to pursue a B.A. in performing arts in the field of musical theater.

In 2023, he earned his degree in Marketing Management in University of San Jose–Recoletos through the Expanded Tertiary Education Equivalency and Accreditation Program (ETEEAP).

=== Business career ===
In 1990, Gianni and Franca Guidicelli migrated to Cebu City when Matteo was born. In 2016, Matteo and his siblings, Giorgia and Gianpaolo, founded Trattoria da Gianni, at The Crossroads Mall in Cebu City. In 2018 and 2022, respectively, Guidicelli opened Class A Da Gianni Cucina Italiana in Filinvest City, Alabang, Muntinlupa, and Il Fornaio da Gianni at Uptown Mall, Bonifacio Global City, Taguig. In November 2024, duct exhaust combustion cause damage to Da Gianni Cucina Italiana, but has since been repaired.

=== Entertainment career ===
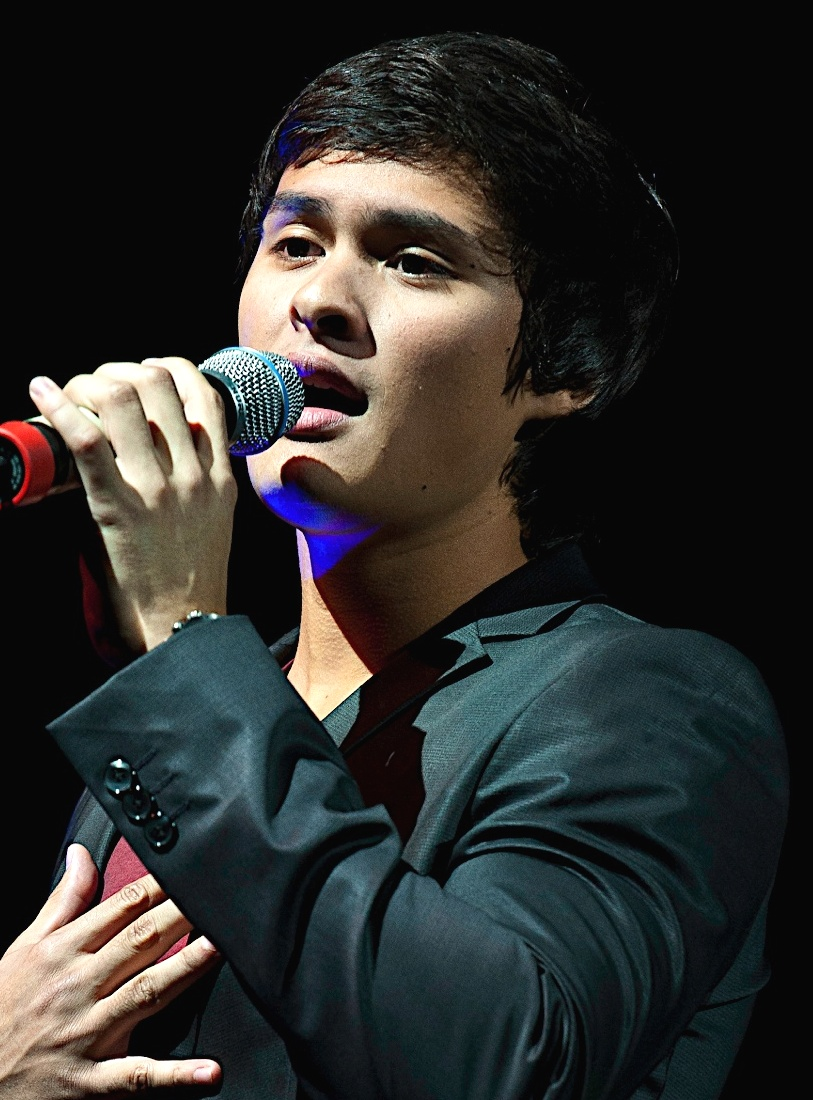
Guidicelli at the KC Concepcion US Concert, November 2010

Guidicelli's acting career started when he joined the fourth season of the teenage comedy sitcom Go Kada Go in 2007, becoming a member of ABS-CBN's Star Magic. The next year, he played supporting roles in the action fantasy show Kung Fu Kids and in the soap opera Ligaw na Bulaklak. He used to be a regular on SOP Fully Charged along with a guest role in All My Life as part of his transfer to GMA Network. In 2010, he returned to ABS-CBN through the primetime fantasy television series Agua Bendita, where he was given a major role.

In 2011, Guidicelli became one of the hosts of the noon-time variety game show Happy Yipee Yehey!, and was cast to play Trevor Wu, one of Kim Chiu's leading men in My Binondo Girl, a TV show shot in Manila and Hong Kong, and released internationally. 2011 also marked the year Guidicelli was cast in his first film, Catch Me, I'm in Love.

He landed his first lead role in 2012, starring as the lovestruck Carlo in the successful indie film, My Cactus Heart.

Apart from acting, Guidicelli also pursued a career in singing. In 2011, Star Records released Guidicelli's first single "Someone Like You" as an Internet download. On January 17, 2016, he launched his first self-titled album Matteo Guidicelli under the same recording company.

He played a lead role in the romantic show Dolce Amore, which debuted on February 15, 2016.

After 13 years of being with Star Magic, Guidicelli signed a contract with Viva Artists Agency.

After almost 13 years, Guidicelli returned to GMA Network to join the longest-running morning show Unang Hirit.

=== Military ===
Guidicelli is a reservist in the Philippine Army as a 2nd Lieutenant of the Armed Forces of the Philippines (AFP). He has undergone rigorous training with the 1st Scout Ranger Regiment and the Presidential Security Group. The AFP confirmed that he was treated the same way as any other trainee despite his celebrity status.

== Personal life ==
In November 2019, Matteo got engaged to his longtime girlfriend, singer Sarah Geronimo; they secretly got married in a protestant wedding ceremony at Victory Church in Taguig on February 20, 2020.

== Filmography ==
=== Film ===
Year	Title	Role	Notes	Source
2011	Catch Me, I'm in Love	Vito		
2012	My Cactus Heart	Carlo		
2012	Paglaya sa tanikala	Saint Jerome Emiliani; Brother Jerry		
2013	Saturday Night Chills			
2014	Somebody To Love	Tristan Villarama		
2014	Moron 5.2: The Transformation	Michael Angelo Marcos	Replacement of Martin Escudero	
2014	Shake, Rattle & Roll XV	Dave	Segment: "Flight 666"	
2016	Tupang Ligaw	Abel		
2017	Can't Help Falling in Love	Jason		
2017	The Ghost Bride	Clinton Yu		
2018	Single Single: Love Is Not Enough	Joey		
2019	Mina-Anud	Paul		
2020	Ranger G	Himself		
2023	Penduko	Pedro Penduko		
2024	Wonderful Nightmare		Philippine film adaptation of South Korean movie.	

=== Television ===
Year	Title	Role	Notes	Source
2007	Let's Go!	Matteo	Episode: "Let's Go Camping"	
2007	Initial D: Fourth Stage	Takumi Fujiwara	Voice only, Animax Asia dub	
2007	Gokada Go!	Matteo		
2007	Your Song Presents: Bakit Labis Kitang Mahal	Mark		
2007	Kung Fu Kids	Gian Marasigan Fernandez		
2008	Ligaw na Bulaklak	Michael Espiritu		
2009	All My Life	Matt		
2009	SOP Fully Charged	Himself - Performer / Host		
2010–2023	ASAP	Himself - Performer		
2010	Maalaala Mo Kaya	Joseph	Episode: "Piano"	
2010	Agua Bendita	Ronnie Aguirre		
2010	Wansapanataym	Gorio	Episode: "Inday Sa Balitaw"	
2010	Your Song Presents: Andi	JM Velasco		
2011	Your Song Presents: Kim	Julius Javier		
2011	Mara Clara	One of the 18 roses	Cameo	
2011	Happy, Yipee, Yehey!	Himself - Host		
2011	My Binondo Girl	Trevor Wu		
2012	Toda Max	Matt Alvarado		
2012–13	Precious Hearts Romances Presents: Paraiso	Brennan Galang		
2013	Promil Pre-School I-Shine Talent Camp 2	Himself - Host		
2013–14	Jim Fernandez's Galema, Anak Ni Zuma	Morgan Villalobos		
2014	The Biggest Loser Pinoy Edition: Doubles	Himself - Host		
2015	Maalaala Mo Kaya	Marlon Vargas	Episode: "Baller"	
2015	Pablo S. Gomez's Inday Bote	Greg Navarro		
2015–16	Single/Single	Joey		
2016	Dolce Amore	Giancarlo De Luca		
2018	Bagani	Lakam		
2018	The Crawl	Himself - Host	Episode:"The Crawl Italy"	
2020	Masked Singer Pilipinas	Himself - Judge		
2021	Born to Be a Star	Himself - Host		
2022–2023	Tropang LOL	Himself - Host		
2023–present	Unang Hirit	Himself - Host		
2023–2024	Black Rider	Police Senior MSgt. Rafael "Paeng" Policarpio		
2025–present	Agenda	Segment anchor		
2026	A Secret in Prague	Donatello Moraviano "Il Pittore"		

== Discography ==
- Matteo Guidicelli (2015)
- Hey (2017)

== Awards and nominations ==
=== Entertainment Awards ===
Year	Work	Award	Category	Result	Source
2010	—N/a	FAMAS Awards	German Moreno Youth Achievement Award	Won	
2011	Agua Bendita	GMMSF Box-Office Entertainment Awards	Most Promising Male Star of the Year	Won	
2011	Agua Bendita	Golden Screen TV Awards	Outstanding Breakthrough Performance by an Actor	Nominated	
2011	Catch Me, I'm in Love	PMPC Star Awards for Movies	New Movie Actor of the Year	Nominated	
2013	I-Shine Talent Camp	PMPC Star Awards for Television	Best Talent Search Program Host	Nominated	
2013	Saturday Night Chills	CinemaOne Originals	Best Actor	Won	
2016	Dolce Amore	PMPC Star Awards for Television	Best Drama Supporting Actor	Nominated	
2017	Television & Movies	Eastwood City Walk Of Fame	Celebrity Star Inductee For Television	Won	

== Sports ==
=== Kart racing ===
- 2002 Philippine Cadet 85 Class - champion
- 2003 Asian Championship, ICA Jr. - 1st runner-up
- 2004 Philippine Open Class - champion
- 2004 Philippine Rotax Max Jr. - champion
- 2005 ICA Superkart Series Championships - 1st runner-up
- 2005 Philippine 125 Open - champion

=== Sports awards ===
- Men Rookie of the Year nominee in SBR Awards 2012
- Philippine MotorSport Icon Award 2023
