= Kim Chiu =

Filipino actress (born 1990)

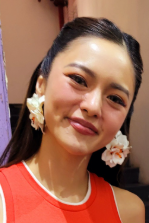
- Chiu in 2025
- Born: Kimberly Sue Yap Chiu; April 19, 1990 (age 36); Cebu City, Philippines
- Education: University of the Philippines
- Occupations: Actress; singer
- Years active: 2006–present (on hiatus)
- Awards: Full list
- Musical career
- Genre: Pop
- Instrument: Vocals
- Label: Star Music

Chinese name
- Traditional Chinese: 張金珠
- Simplified Chinese: 张金珠
Transcriptions
Standard Mandarin
- Hanyu Pinyin: Zhāng Jīn Zhū
Yue: Cantonese
- Jyutping: Zoeng^{1} Gam^{1} Zyu^{1}
Southern Min
- Hokkien POJ: Tiuⁿ Kim Chiu

Kimberly Sue Yap Chiu (Tagalog pronunciation: [tʃʊ]; born April 19, 1990) is a Filipino actress, singer, performer, television host, and businesswoman. Known for her performances in a range of genres across film and television, she rose to fame after winning the first teen edition of Pinoy Big Brother (2006). Chiu's films have grossed almost ₱1.5 billion at the box office, making her one of the highest-grossing box office stars of all time. Forbes Asia named her one of Asia Pacific's most influential Filipino personalities in 2020.

Dubbed as the "Multimedia Idol" by various media outlets, she initially began playing supporting roles in several television shows early in her career. Her breakthrough came following her pairing with Gerald Anderson and has appeared together in a number of projects, most notable being Sana Maulit Muli (2007), I've Fallen for You (2007) and Tayong Dalawa (2009). The following year, Chiu topped Yes! Magazine's list of 100 Most Beautiful Stars and ventured more dramatic and comedic roles. It was succeeded by a string of commercially successful projects such as The Healing (2012), Bride for Rent (2014), Etiquette for Mistresses (2015) and One Great Love (2018) in films, as well as Minsan Lang Kita Iibigin (2011), My Binondo Girl (2011), Ina, Kapatid, Anak (2012), Ikaw Lamang (2014), Love Thy Woman (2020), Linlang (2023) and What’s Wrong with Secretary Kim (2024) in television.

Chiu has received numerous accolades for her work in film and television, including a Seoul International Drama Award, a FAMAS Award, eight Star Awards for Television, and eleven Box Office Entertainment Awards. As a recording artist, all of her studio albums have been certified Gold or more by the Philippine Association of the Record Industry. She was picked by Disney Southeast Asia to model as Mulan in a special 2015 calendar shoot. In 2010, she was inducted into the Eastwood City Walk of Fame for her contributions to Philippine entertainment. Chiu is a regular performer on the weekly musical-variety show ASAP (2006–present) and is one of the main hosts of the daily noontime variety show It's Showtime (2020–present).

== Early life ==
Kimberly Sue Yap Chiu was born on April 19, 1990. She is the fourth of five children to William Chiu, a businessman from Mindoro and Louella (née Yap; 1963–2013), a native of Dinagat Islands who migrated to Surigao del Sur; both her parents are Chinese Filipino. She is fluent in Cebuano, Tagalog, and English, with her Waray, Hokkien, and Mandarin Chinese at a beginner level only.

Since her parents' separation in 1998, Kim had a dysfunctional relationship with both of her parents. She and her siblings Lakam, Twinkle, William, and John Paul were raised by their paternal grandmother and, as children, frequently moved residences in the Visayas; including in Tacloban, Cebu, Cagayan de Oro, General Santos, Mindoro and back to Cebu City until 2006. In 2013, she reconciled with her father "after five years of estrangement" while visiting his second partner and half-siblings in San Jose, Occidental Mindoro. A month later in June, her biological mother, Louella, fell into a coma. Following a week of hospitalization, Louella died on June 23, 2013, due to brain aneurysm. In a eulogy dedicated to her mother, she debunked rumors of animosity over her mother's child abandonment and expressed: "An angel guides me in my decisions in life. For me, that is finally my mom."

== Career ==
=== 2006–2008: Career beginnings ===
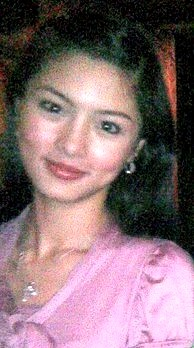
Chiu in 2008

Chiu gained prominence when she won the reality series Pinoy Big Brother: Teen Edition. She was dubbed as "Chinita Princess ng Cebu". For the show, Chiu left her hometown of Cebu City and moved to Manila. She, along with the rest of the housemates entered the Big Brother house on April 23, 2006. After 42 days in the Big Brother house, she was named the Teen Big Winner with 626,562 votes (41.4% of the total votes) at the Aliw Theatre inside the Cultural Center of the Philippines Complex in Pasay. She was the only housemate who was never nominated for eviction.

After winning, Chiu became part of Star Magic. She and her on-screen partner Gerald Anderson became regulars in ASAP XV and appeared together in several ABS-CBN shows Love Spell, comedy sitcom Aalog-Alog and in the film First Day High.

In 2007, Chiu starred in the primetime TV series entitled Sana Maulit Muli alongside Anderson which was released to significant acclaim. That year, she was nominated and eventually won the 38th Guillermo Mendoza Box Office Awards as Most Promising Female Star and Best New Female TV Personality (for Sana Maulit Muli) at the 21st PMPC Star Awards. Sana Maulit Muli was later released in Taiwan under the PTS network, under the title Chances.

Chiu then launched her debut album "Gwa Ai Di" (Hokkien simplified Chinese: 我爱你; traditional Chinese: 我愛你; Pe̍h-ōe-jī: Góa ài dí; lit. 'I Love You') under Star Records, which included the single Crazy Love. It reached a Gold Record status.

Gaining much recognition for her acting roles, she then starred in the movie I've Fallen For You under Star Cinema and continually appeared in numerous advertisements. In 2008, Chiu was cast in the Philippine adaptation of the South Korean TV series My Girl.

=== 2009–2011: Breakthrough ===
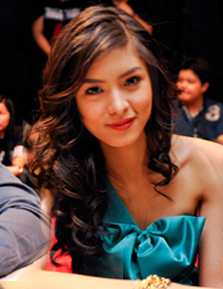
Chiu in April 2010

In 2009, Chiu secured her name as a top actress in the highly acclaimed TV series entitled Tayong Dalawa. She garnered several acting awards for her portrayal of Audrey, a woman who is loved by two soldiers.

Her movie I Love You, Goodbye became part of Star Cinema's official entry to the 2009 Metro Manila Film Festival. It was Chiu's first role as a villain and her first film to hit P100 million mark, with her receiving several nominations under different award-giving bodies including PMPC, 12th Gawad PASADO Awards and the 34th MMFF for Best Supporting Actress.

In 2010, she then starred in the romance film Paano Na Kaya, released nationally and internationally. She also starred in the well-received primetime drama, Kung Tayo'y Magkakalayo, the highest rating teleserye of 2010 in the Philippines. In October 2010, Chiu and Anderson teamed up for the last consecutive time in the film Till My Heartaches End. In the midst of movie promotions, it was reported that the long-time couple (known as Kimerald) had split, yet the reason for the breakup was not discussed.

She top-billed in a weekly musical anthology series Your Song, as a sub-series for the 12th season called Your Song Presents: Kim. It ran for four months and led her to pair up with Sam Milby, Jake Cuenca, Pokwang, Derek Ramsay, Enrique Gil and Vice Ganda. In 2011, Chiu starred in the romantic-comedy television series My Binondo Girl alongside Xian Lim, Matteo Guidicelli, and Jolo Revilla.

=== 2012–present: Film career and critical success ===
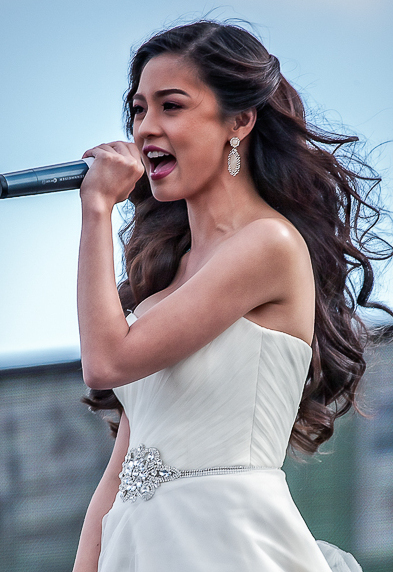
Chiu in 2014

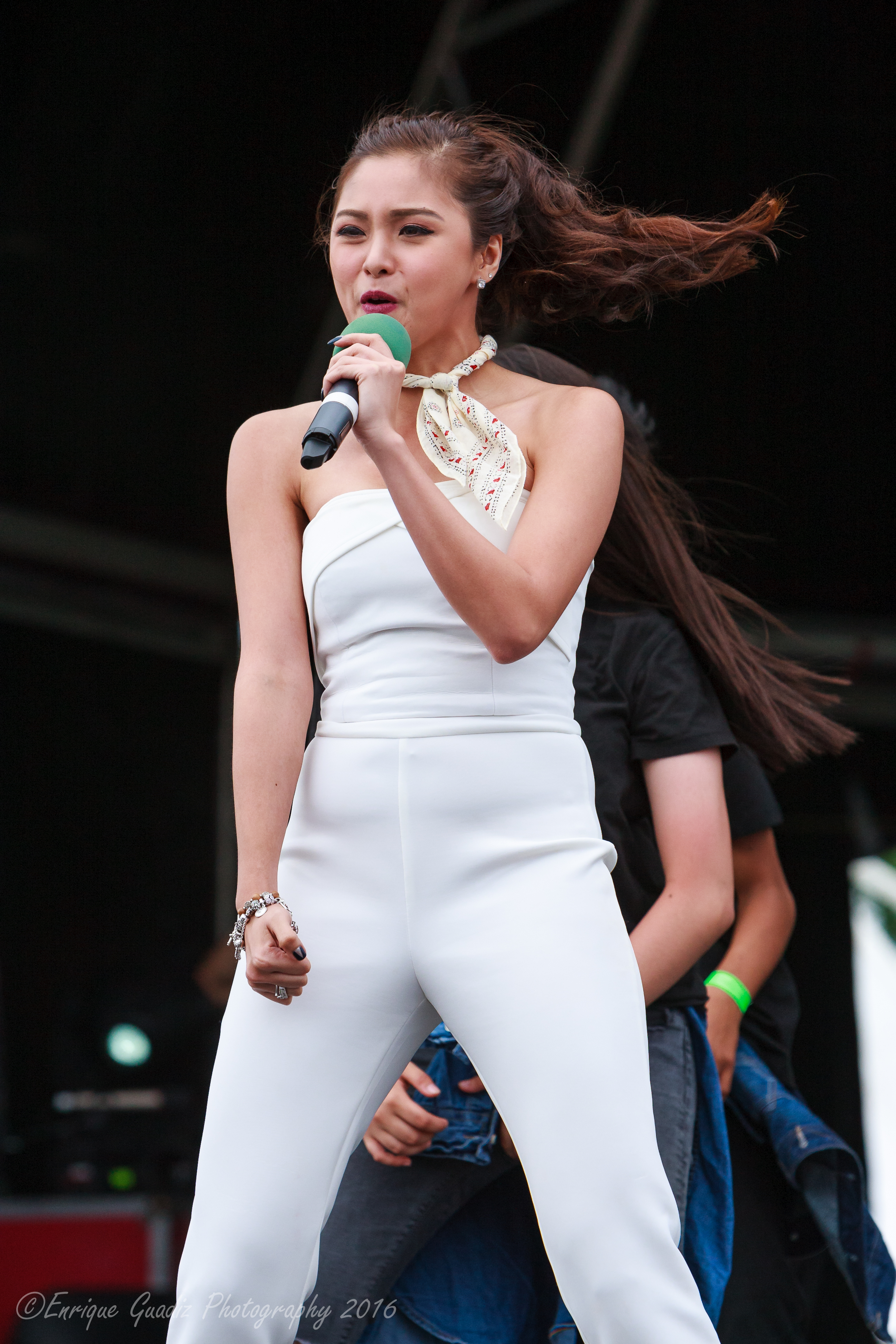
Chiu performing in London in 2016

In 2012, Chiu starred in a horror film with Vilma Santos entitled The Healing. She played a woman who is cured of glomerulonephritis through a healer but must suffer a curse. From this film, she received a number of Best Supporting Actress nominations from almost all of the film award-giving bodies, missing only the Gawad Urian and The Young Critics' Circle.

Chiu also returned to melodrama acting via Ina, Kapatid, Anak, alongside Xian Lim, Maja Salvador and Enchong Dee. After the teleserye ended with an average TV rating of 30.3% via Kantar Media/TNS, it was awarded Best Teleserye of the Year at Philippine's 2013 Yahoo Awards and was aired internationally as Her Mother's Daughter, released in foreign territories including MIPTV in France and at DISCOP West Asia in Turkey. Her portrayal also earned her an award for Best TV Drama Actress. She reunited in a movie with Anderson titled 24/7 in Love, Star Magic's ensemble film in view of the agency's 20th anniversary.

She starred in a film adaption of Ramon Bautista's novel co-starring Xian Lim, Bakit Hindi Ka Crush Ng Crush Mo?, released on July 17, 2013. Her performance received positive feedback and critics praise in view of her first comedic role on the big screen.

In January 2014, Chiu cemented her commercial draw with the romantic-comedy movie entitled Bride for Rent. Chiu plays Rocky, a poor woman who agrees to marry for money. As Star Cinema's first movie offering of 2014, the film met both critical and commercial success, earning more than P21.2 million pesos in its opening day and broke the P200 million pesos mark on its 8th day. The film established Chiu as one of the country's biggest stars having both a successful film and television career. Having grossed P325 million, it is the sixth highest grossing Filipino film of all time, the second highest grossing Filipino romantic comedy movie of all-time, third highest grossing non-MMFF film of all-time and also the highest-grossing January-released film of all time in the country.

After the success of her two films, Chiu returned to television in the 2014 period drama, Ikaw Lamang. The series co-stars Coco Martin, Julia Montes, Jake Cuenca and KC Concepcion and dealt with social class, politics, and forbidden love. It held the first and second place viewer rating in its time slot and was awarded Best Primetime Drama Series at the 28th PMPC Star Awards for Television. This followed with the romantic comedy film, Past Tense and a portrayal as Mulan for Walt Disney Asia's 12 Days of Princess campaign.

In 2015, she appeared as one of five mistresses (alongside veterans Kris Aquino, Claudine Barretto, Iza Calzado) in the high-profile film, Etiquette for Mistresses. She recorded the Cebuano songs "Duyog" and "Labyu Langga" for the film's soundtrack. She also top-billed in the rom-com, All You Need Is Pag-Ibig, which is Star Cinema's official entry to the 2015 MMFF.

In 2016, she starred on the romantic drama series The Story of Us. Her performance as Tin Manalo gave her another Best Actress Awards from 6th EdukCircle Awards, 6th OFW Parangal Awards and Guillermo Mendoza. Also, on the last quarter of 2016, Kimerald loveteam was announced to set back on television via a triathlon soap opera television series Ikaw Lang ang Iibigin for the celebration of their 10th anniversary in show business.

In May 2017, Ikaw Lang ang Iibigin premiered on ABS-CBN's PrimeTanghali noontime block replacing Langit Lupa. The show debuted at Number 1 in its time slot, and consistently ranked ahead of its competition during its nine-month run.

In November 2017, she appeared in the horror film The Ghost Bride, which was also her first solo outing as an actress.

In April 2018, she appeared in the Filipino horror-comedy film Da One That Ghost Away directed by Tony Y. Reyes together with Ryan Bang, Enzo Pineda and the duo of Maymay Entrata and Edward Barber. The movie grossed over ₱8 million on its opening day and over ₱70 million in its entire theatrical run.

In December 2018, her film One Great Love became Regal Film's official entry to the 2018 Metro Manila Film Festival (MMFF). It was Chiu's first time Venturing into an adult, steamy oriented role and also working with both Dennis Trillo and JC de Vera. She received a nomination at the 44th annual MMFF Awards for Best Actress. She also won the Film Actress of the Year in the 50th GMMSF Box-Office Entertainment Awards for her performance in the film One Great Love. The film garnered over ₱50 million in its MMFF theatrical run.

In 2020, her song "Bawal Lumabas (The Classroom Song)" became the most disliked song on WISH 107.5's YouTube channel, having reportedly received over 404,000 dislikes against 78,000 likes within 14 hours. The song was based from a viral edit made by DJ Squammy from her statement about the ABS-CBN franchise renewal controversy. In 2023, Chiu had leading roles in the drama series, Fit Check and Linlang, both released on Amazon Prime Video.

In 2024, Chiu played the titular character in the Philippine adaptation of What’s Wrong with Secretary Kim opposite Paulo Avelino, which is released on Viu. She earned a Best Actress nomination for the series at the 2024 Asian Television Awards. She was named as the 2025 calendar girl for the liquor brand Tanduay.

== Personal life ==
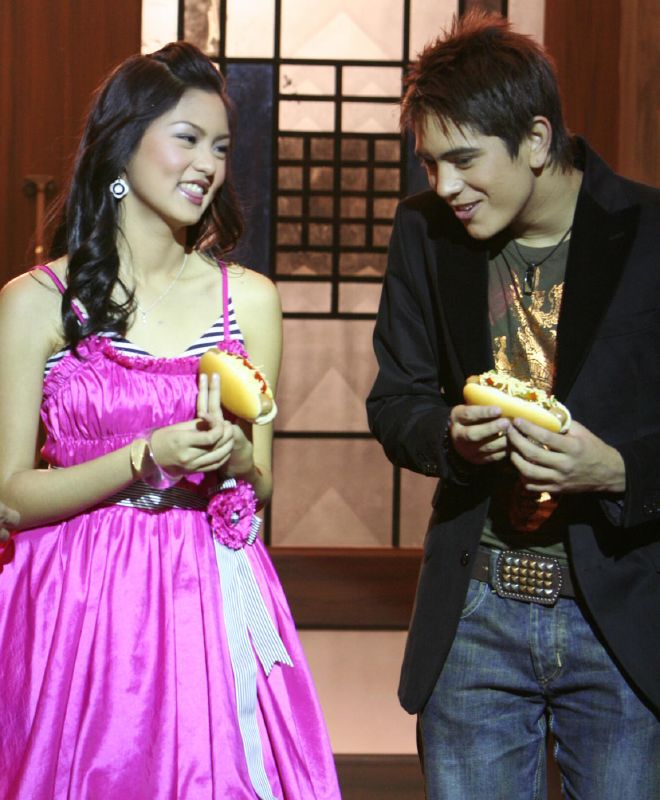
Chiu and Gerald Anderson in 2006 during a Jollibee commercial

Chiu dated her former onscreen partner and Pinoy Big Brother co-competitor Gerald Anderson from 2006 to 2010. She was also in a relationship with actor Xian Lim from 2012 to 2023.

As one of the Philippines' highest paid endorsers, Chiu addressed the pork barrel scam in a press conference on August 28, 2013, noting the amount of tax celebrities like herself pay to the government: "The money isn't a joke [...] we pay so much tax and we don't know where it's going." The Bureau of Internal Revenue confirmed Chiu as 131st top taxpayer in the country with ₱9.3 million in income taxes in 2013.

In 2011, Kim Chiu graduated from high school through the Alternative Learning System of the Department of Education.

In 2015, Chiu passed the UPCAT and enrolled in the University of the Philippines's UPOU program for business courses.

=== Legal issues ===
Chiu filed a qualified theft complaint against her sister, Lakambini Chiu, after discovering serious financial discrepancies in one of their business ventures on December 2, 2025. In 2026, Lakambini was arrested for 44.4 million pesos in qualified theft.

=== Shooting incident ===
On March 4, 2020, Chiu was traveling along Katipunan Avenue in Quezon City on her way to a taping of her series Love Thy Woman when two unidentified gunmen, riding-in-tandem on a motorcycle, fired six gunshots at her van. Chiu and her companions were unharmed. Investigators examined the shooting as a possible case of mistaken identity. Chiu later revealed on social media that, a day after the incident, a person claiming to have been the actual target called one of her bosses to apologize.

== Other ventures ==
=== Philanthropic works ===
Chiu uses her media influence to promote various causes. She began partnership with GlaxoSmithKline for its yearly asthma awareness campaigns, Win Against Asthma, after battling asthma as a child. Chiu has since participated in disaster relief organizations such as Philippine National Red Cross and Sagip Kapamilya. She joined the PETA campaign "Free Mali" along with Xian Lim. Chiu made a video plea for Mali, asking that she be moved to a sanctuary for the sake of her well-being. In August 2012, she and Lim spearheaded a relief operation in Marikina. Chiu was heavily involved with relief efforts for Typhoon Yolanda via the Red Cross, which had affected parts of her hometown. Aside from giving food and water, she also held week-long clothes auctions to raise money for Typhoon victims.

By 2013, it was also revealed that the actress was involved with regularly funding Isla Pulo, an impoverished community of 1,000 inhabitants in Manila Bay, Philippines.

=== Business ===
In October 2022, Chiu launched her bag business, House of Little Bunny Philippines, an online shop selling leather handbags. In December 2025, Chiu filed a criminal complaint for qualified theft against her sister Lakambini after discovering financial discrepancies in their business; Lakambini was part of the management of the company.

In mid-2023, it was publicly revealed that Chiu had owned a commercial building in Cagayan de Oro.

== Filmography ==
=== Film ===
Year	Title	Role
2006	First Day High	Indira "Indi" Dela Concepcion
2007	I've Fallen For You	Alex Tamayo Reyes
2008	Shake, Rattle & Roll X	Joy
2009	I Love You, Goodbye	Melissa "Issa" Benitez
2010	Paano na Kaya	Mae Chua
2010	Till My Heartaches End	Agnes Garcia
2012	The Healing	Cookie Limguangco
2012	24/7 in Love	Patty Castillo
2013	Bakit Hindi Ka Crush Ng Crush Mo?	Sandy Veloso
2014	Bride for Rent	Racquelita "Rocky" Dela Cruz
2014	Past Tense	Rosabelle "Belle" Garcia
2015	Must Date the Playboy	Victoria "Tori" Alcantara
2015	Etiquette for Mistresses	Ina Del Prado
2015	All You Need Is Pag-Ibig	Anya
2017	The Ghost Bride	Mayen Lim
2018	Da One That Ghost Away	Carmel Monseratt
2018	One Great Love	Zyra Paez
2020	U-Turn	Donna Suarez
2021	Huwag Kang Lalabas	Amor
2022	Always	Anna Alfonso
2025	My Love Will Make You Disappear	Samantha "Sari" Gonzales

=== Television ===
Year	Title	Role	Ref.
2006	Pinoy Big Brother: Teen Edition 1	Housemate; Big Winner	
2006	Love Spell Presents: Pasko Na, Santa Ko	Abby	
2006	Love Spell Presents: Charm and Crystal	Crystal	
2006	Aalog-Alog	Kim Chan Sukimura	
2006	Love Spell Presents: My Boy, My Girl	Stephanie "Stephen"	
2006	Your Song Presents: Alive	Abby	
2006	Your Song Presents: Bitin Sa Iyo	Kayan	
2006	Maalaala Mo Kaya: Bus	Kate	
2006	Star Magic Presents: Ang Lovey Kong All Around	Baby Girl	
2006–present	ASAP	Host / Performer	
2007	Your Song Presents: Ngiti	Sansan	
2007	Love Spell Presents: Cindy-rella	Cindy / Rella	
2007	Your Song Presents: Someday	Jodie Borela	
2007	Gokada Go!	Melody Go	
2007	Sana Maulit Muli	Jasmine "Poknat" Sta. Maria	
2008	Your Song Presents: My Only Hope	April Padilla	
2008	Maalaala Mo Kaya: Notebook	Ameng Jurado	
2008	My Girl	Jasmine Estocapio	
2008	Sineserye Presents: The Susan Roces Cinema Collection: Maligno	Eliza	
2009	Tayong Dalawa	Audrey King	
2010	Your Song Presents: Kim	Various roles	
2010	Wansapanataym: Super Kikay and Her Flying Pagong	Super K / Kikay	
2010	Your Song Presents: Maling Akala	Yen Cobangbang / Karl Anda	
2010	Banana Split	Guest	
2010	Maalaala Mo Kaya: Bimpo	Joy Carbonel	
2010	Kung Tayo'y Magkakalayo	Gwen Marie Crisanto	
2011	Minsan Lang Kita Iibigin	young Alondra Sebastiano	
2011–2012	My Binondo Girl	Jade Dimaguiba / Jade Sy / Yuan Sy	
2012	Maalaala Mo Kaya: Kalendaryo	Pauline Chaves	
2012–2013	Ina, Kapatid, Anak	Celyn Marasigan / Celyn Buenaventura	
2013	Wansapanataym: My Fairy Kasambahay	Elyza	
2014	Ikaw Lamang	Isabelle Miravelez	
2014	Ikaw Lamang – Book 2	Andrea Isabel "Jacq" Hidalgo	
2016	Maalaala Mo Kaya: "Korona"	Jeany Rose Joromat	
2016	The Voice Kids (season 3)	Host	
2016	The Story of Us	Cristine "Tin" Manalo	
2017	Maalaala Mo Kaya: Sulat	Cze Legaspi	
2017–2018	Ikaw Lang ang Iibigin	Bianca Agbayani	
2018	Maalaala Mo Kaya: Mata	Sarah	
2018	Ipaglaban Mo: Korea	Hazel	
2018	Maalaala Mo Kaya: Tangke	Maria Ana "Ani" Rosario Sandoval	
2018	Star Hunt: The Grand Audition Show	Host	
2018–2019	Pinoy Big Brother: Otso	Host	
2019	Maalaala Mo Kaya: MVP	Sisi Rondina	
2020	Love Thy Woman	Jia Wong	
2020	Maalaala Mo Kaya: Pancit	Kristine	
2020	Bawal Lumabas: The Series	Emerald Tesoro	
2020–2021	Pinoy Big Brother: Connect	Host	
2020–present	It's Showtime	Host	
2021–2022	Pinoy Big Brother: Kumunity	Host	
2022–2023	Dream Maker: Search For the Next Global Pop Group	Host	
2023	Fit Check	Melanie Dela Cruz	
2023-2024	Linlang	Juliana Lualhati	
2024	What's Wrong with Secretary Kim	Kim Liwanag	
2024	Pinoy Big Brother: Gen 11	Host	
2025	Pinoy Big Brother: Celebrity Collab Edition	Host	
2025	The Alibi	Stella Marie Morales	
2025	Pinoy Big Brother: Celebrity Collab Edition 2.0	Host	
2026	Come Dine With Me: Celebrity Philippines		
2026	Kopino		

== Discography ==
=== Studio albums ===
List of studio albums, with sales figures and certifications
Title	Album details	Sales	Certifications
Gwa Ai Di	Released: June 2007 (PH); Label: Star Records; Formats: CD, digital download	PHI: 7,500	PARI: Gold
Chinita Princess	Released: April 27, 2015 (PH); Label: Star Music; Formats: CD, digital download	PHI: 15,000	PARI: Platinum
Chinita Princess: Touch of Your Love	Released: September 28, 2017 (PH); Label: Star Music; Formats: CD, digital download	PHI: 7,500	PARI: Gold

=== Singles ===
List of singles as lead artist, showing year released, and associated albums
Title	Year	Album
"Peng You (Tagalog Adaptation)"	2007	Gwa Ai Di
"Crazy Love"	2007	Gwa Ai Di
"Mr. Right"	2015	Chinita Princess
"Darating Din"	2015	Chinita Princess
"Okay na Ako"	2017	Chinita Princess: Touch of Your Love
"Wag Kang Bumitaw"	2020	Non-album singles
"Bawal Lumabas (The Classroom Song)"	2020	Non-album singles
" Kimmi" (with DJ M.O.D.)	2021	Non-album singles
"Ms. Ukay"	2023	Non-album singles

=== Other appearances ===
Title	Year	Album
"Mine"	2007	Sana Maulit Muli (Official Teleserye Soundtrack)
"Santa Claus" (with Shaina Magdayao)	2007	Star Magic Christmas
"Crazy Love (Chinese Version)"	2008	My Girl (Original Teleserye Soundtrack)
"Pusong Lito"	2008	My Girl (Original Teleserye Soundtrack)
"Sabihin Mo Na" (with Gerald Anderson)	2008	My Girl (Original Teleserye Soundtrack)
"Only Hope"	2008	My Only Hope (Original Teleserye Soundtrack)

=== Music videos ===
As featured artist
Year	Title	Ref.
2007	"Crazy Love"	
2007	"Kering Keri"	
2012	"Softly"	
2015	"Mr. Right"	
2015	"Darating Din"	
2017	"Okay Na Ako"	
2021	"Kimmi"	

As guest actor
Year	Title	Artist(s)	Ref.
2006	"Love Team"	The Itchyworms	
2013	"Discolamon"	Banda ni Kleggy	

== Awards and nominations ==
Chiu has received several awards and nominations including eleven Box Office Entertainment Awards, nine PMPC Star Awards for Television, four EdukCircle Awards, two Gawad Pasado Awards, a FAMAS Award, a Gaward Tanglaw award, a PMPC Star Awards for Movie, The EDDYS Award, an Asia Pacific Luminare award, a Nickelodeon Kids Choice Award and a Seoul International Drama Award including nominations from Metro Manila Film Festival, Golden Screen TV Awards and Golden Screen Movie Awards.

In music, she received various accolades for her albums including five PMPC Star Awards for Music, two Myx Music Awards and MOR Pinoy Music Awards and three Awit Awards nominations.

== Notes ==
Preceded by Keanna Reeves	Pinoy Big Brother: Big Winner; 2006	Succeeded by Bea Saw
Preceded by First Teen Big Winner	Pinoy Big Brother: Teen Big Winner; 2006	Succeeded by Ejay Falcon
