= My Binondo Girl =

- Title card
- Also known as: Jade, 玉: 我岷伦洛女孩
- Genre: Romantic comedy Drama
- Written by: Noreen Capili; Dang Sulit; Honey Hidalgo
- Directed by: Malu L. Sevilla; Francis Xavier Pasion
- Starring: Kim Chiu; Xian Lim; Jolo Revilla; Matteo Guidicelli
- Theme music composer: Ogie Alcasid
- Opening theme: "Sino Ako" by Regine Velasquez
- Ending theme: "Ako Sa 'yo lamang" by Xian Lim
- Country of origin: Philippines
- Original languages: Filipino; Chinese
- No. of episodes: 110

Production
- Production locations: Philippines (Binondo, Manila); China (Hong Kong)
- Editors: John Ryan Bonifacio; George Padolina, Jr. Vince San Antonio
- Running time: 30-45 minutes (Original); 45-60 minutes (International)
- Production company: Dreamscape Entertainment Television

Original release
- Network: ABS-CBN
- Release: August 22, 2011 – January 20, 2012

My Binondo Girl (simplified Chinese: 玉: 我的岷伦洛女孩; traditional Chinese: 玉: 我的岷倫洛女孩; pinyin: Yù: Wǒde Mínlúnluò Nǚhái; Pe̍h-ōe-jī: Gio̍k: Góa-ê Bîn-lûn-lo̍h Lú-hâi) is a Philippine television drama romantic comedy series broadcast by ABS-CBN. Directed by Malu L. Sevilla and Francis Xavier Pasion, it stars Kim Chiu, Xian Lim, Jolo Revilla and Matteo Guidicelli. It aired on the network's Primetime Bida line up from August 22, 2011 to January 20, 2012. The drama revolves around a girl who pretends to be a man to gain her father's affection.

== Synopsis ==
My Binondo Girl is the story of Jade Dimaguiba, a girl who spent her life seeking the approval and acceptance of her Chinese father Chen Sy (Richard Yap), who attempted to put her up for adoption when she was young because of China's One Child Policy (wherein couples either put their first child up for adoption or pay a government fine to have a second child).

His decision was swiftly made after learning that his Filipina wife Zeny (Ai-Ai delas Alas) is pregnant with a baby boy, which is more favored under the Chinese tradition. In order to protect her child, Zeny returns to the Philippines only to suffer a miscarriage and lose the second child.

Years after, Chen Sy, already a successful business tycoon, finds Zeny to see Yuan, the baby boy. Zeny refuses to tell him his whereabouts but despite this, Chen continues to ignore Jade and disregard her as his daughter. Jade vows to gain her father's acceptance someday and graduates with top honors to prove to her father that despite her gender, she is a worthy daughter.

However, in an unexpected turn of events, Chen loses his other son Chen Sy II (from his second marriage) to an accident and Jade is forced to pose as Yuan in order to get her mother and grandmother Amor (Gina Pareño) out of jail because of Jean (Cherry Pie Picache), the second wife's machinations. Jade is helped through her journey by Onyx (Jolo Revilla), her childhood friend and determined suitor; Trevor (Matteo Guidicelli), the happy go lucky stepson of her father's business partner; and Andy (Xian Lim), who started off as her competition but ended up as one of her staunchest supporters upon learning her dual identity.

== Cast and characters ==
=== Main cast ===
- Kim Chiu as Jadelyn "Jade" Dimaguiba- Sy -Wu / Yuan Sy (Chinese: 施玉安; pinyin: Shī Yù'ān; Pe̍h-ōe-jī: Sí Gio̍k-an)
- Xian Lim as Andy Wu
- Jolo Revilla as Onyx Dimalanta†
- Matteo Guidicelli as Trevor Wu

=== Supporting cast ===
- Maja Salvador as Amber Dionisio†
- Ai-Ai delas Alas as Zenaida "Zheny" Dimaguiba-Sy
- Gina Pareño as Amorsola "Amor" Dimaguiba
- Cherry Pie Picache as Jeanette "Jean" Dimasupil
- Glydel Mercado as Luningning "Ningning" Wu†
- Ricardo Cepeda as Edison Wu
- Richard Yap as Chen Sy
- Marina Benipayo as Menchu Wu
- Laureen Uy as Amethyst Sy

=== Extended cast ===
- Simon Ibarra as Arturo Dimalanta
- Gilleth Sandico as Stella Dimalanta
- Coleen Garcia as Marissa
- Eda Nolan as Annie
- David Chua as Stephen
- Bea Saw as Althea
- Moi Marcampo as Anikka Cruz

=== Guest cast ===
- Quintin Alianza as Young Stephen
- Maurice Mabutas as Young Annie
- Aiko Climaco as Lena
- Gwen Garci as Lorraine
- Raymund Concepcion as College Dean
- George Lim as Arturo and Onyx's boss
- Janvier Daily as Rafael Bautista
- Ian Valdez as Parlorista
- John Medina as Gieneth
- Rayver Cruz as Young Edison
- Aze Sasaki as Patrice
- Peter Chua as Wo Shu Master

=== Special participation ===
- Robi Domingo as Chen Sy II†
- Catherine Kiok Lay as Teacher
- Mutya Orquia as young Jade Dimaguiba
- Sharlene San Pedro as preteen Amethyst Sy
- Izzy Canillo as young Onyx
- Kristoff Meneses as young Andy
- Joshen Bernardo as young Trevor

== Production ==
The cast was announced during a press conference on April 7, 2011. In the story conference held by the network, it was stated that Kim Chiu would topbill the series together with Cherry Pie Picache, Glydel Mercado, and Ai-Ai delas Alas. Three leading men were chosen for the series which included Jolo Revilla, Matteo Guidicelli, and Xian Lim. Filming started in April 2011 in Binondo, Manila and Hong Kong.

== Awards and nominations ==
Year	Award	Category	Work	Result
2011	ASAP Pop Viewer's Choice Awards	Pop Kapamilya TV Character	Kim Chiu as Jade/Yuan	Won
2012	26th Star Awards for TV	Best New Male TV Personality	Richard Yap as Papa Chen	Won

== International release ==
Country/Region	Network(s)	Series premiere	Series Title in Country	Reference
Taiwan	PTS	TBA	Jade	
Hong Kong	TVB Pearl	TBA	Jade	
China	CCTV-1, CCTV-8	TBA		
Vietnam	SCTV	TBA	Giấc mơ của Jade (Jade's dream)	
Cambodia	Jade	TBA		
Malaysia	Astro Bella	TBA		

== Awards ==
Year	Award-Giving Body	Category	Recipient	Result
2012	GMMSF Box-Office Entertainment Awards	Princess of Philippine Television	Kim Chiu	Won

== See also ==
- List of programs broadcast by ABS-CBN
- List of ABS-CBN Studios original drama series
