= I'm Drunk, I Love You =

2017 independent romantic comedy film by JP Habac

- Theatrical release poster
- Directed by: JP Habac
- Written by: JP Habac; Giancarlo Abrahan
- Story by: Giancarlo Abrahan; Shayne Guevara-Asuncion; JP Habac
- Produced by: Armi Rae Cacanindin; Daphne O. Chiu
- Starring: Maja Salvador; Paulo Avelino; Dominic Roco; Jasmine Curtis-Smith
- Cinematography: Boy Yñiguez
- Edited by: Carlo Francisco Manatad
- Music by: Jerrold Tarog
- Production companies: Tuko Film Productions; Buchi Boy Entertainment; Artikulo Uno Productions
- Distributed by: Solar Films
- Release date: February 15, 2017
- Running time: 110 minutes
- Country: Philippines
- Language: Filipino
- Budget: ₱5,000,000 (estimated)

I'm Drunk, I Love You, commonly abbreviated as "IDILY",, is a 2017 Filipino romantic comedy independent film directed by JP Habac and co-written by Giancarlo Abrahan and Shayne Guevara-Asuncion. Starring Maja Salvador and Paulo Avelino in their second project together, following a television soap opera Bridges of Love two years earlier, the story follows two best friends, Carson and Dio, and the former's seven-year-long unrequited love for the latter.

A co-production of Tuko Film Productions, Buchi Boy Entertainment, and Artikulo Uno Productions and distributed by Solar Films, the film was released in the Philippines on February 15, 2017.

== Plot ==
Carson and Dio have been best friends throughout their college life at the University of the Philippines Diliman. Unbeknownst to Dio, Carson has secretly harbored romantic feelings for him for seven years. With their graduation approaching, Dio invites Carson on a spontaneous road trip to La Union. They are joined by Carson's close friend Jason Ty, who provides comic relief and moral support to her.

During the trip, Dio reveals that he has reconciled with his ex-girlfriend, Pathy, dampening Carson's hopes of ever confessing her feelings. Despite this, she continues to act as his supportive best friend. As they spend time drinking, bonding, and reminiscing about their college years, Carson struggles with whether she should finally reveal her emotions.

Eventually, Carson tells Dio that she has been in love with him for years. Dio, while acknowledging their close friendship, explains that he does not feel the same way, but the two kiss. Afterward, the group continues their trip, but the atmosphere between Carson and Dio changes.

Meanwhile, Jason meets a man through a dating app and later discovers that he is in a relationship. The man and his boyfriend invite Jason to a threesome. The next morning, Jason decides to stay behind in La Union, while Carson, Dio, and Pathy return to Manila.

After their graduation, Carson and Dio meet privately. They acknowledge the importance of their friendship and reflect on the experiences they have shared. Carson, having come to terms with Dio's feelings, chooses to move forward with her life.

== Cast ==
- Maja Salvador as Caridad Sonia "Carson" Herrera
- Paulo Avelino as Dionysus "Dio" Brillo
- Dominic Roco as Jason Ty
- Jasmine Curtis-Smith as Pathy
- Irma Adlawan as Carson's mother
- Jim Paredes as Dio's father

== Production ==
=== Development ===
Director JP Habac conceived the idea for the film by citing the nightly drinking sessions he had with his friends. He stated in Filipino: "Alam mo na yan, inuman tapos may kaibigan kang masyadong nalasing, tapos sinigaw niya yung mga salitang yan (You know what it is, drinking and there is that friend who gets intoxicated, and then he shouts those words)." Additionally, he stated: "Gusto ko talaga magpakita ng sine na totoo at yung mapapaisip ka. Marami na tayong mga cute na pelikula. I wanted to make a film that would challenge and break RomCom norms. (I truly wanted to show true cinema and one that makes you think thoroughly. We have gotten many cute films. I wanted to make a film that would challenge and break RomCom norms.)"

After two years of conceptualizing these ideas, Habac tapped Giancarlo Abrahan to write the script together.

=== Casting ===
Habac said that during the casting call for the character of Jason, he noted that actors auditioning for the role should come across as someone similar to George, one of the lead characters played by English actor Rupert Everett in the 1997 romantic comedy film My Best Friend's Wedding. The role later went to Dominic Roco.

== Themes ==
I'm Drunk, I Love You is described as a film about unrequited love, using the consumption of alcohol as plot device.

== Soundtrack ==
Having been a fan of musical films (such as Once and Begin Again) and musicals in general, director JP Habac was inspired to include a soundtrack for the film, featuring OPM tracks. In the film, lead stars Maja Salvador and Paulo Avelino performed covers of OPM songs, such as a duet for songs "Maniwala Ka Sana" by Parokya ni Edgar and "Hanggang Dito Na Lang" by Jimmy Bondoc. The soundtrack also features OPM songs by various artists.

== Release ==
I'm Drunk, I Love You was released in the Philippines on February 15, 2017, by Solar Entertainment Corporation.

On February 13, the film's star and co-producer Paulo Avelino express dismayed due to the film's limited release in 60 theaters across the country. He complained on a Twitter post by saying, "Just 60 cinemas for I’m Drunk I Love You? I strongly believe this film is worth more." On a separate tweet the same day, he complained before the MTRCB (particularly its board member Mocha Uson) posing this question in Filipino, "Bakit nga ba hindi inuuna ng mga lokal na sinehan ang mga Pelikulang [sic] Pilipino kesa sa Dayuhang Pelikula? Gawin sanang Batas (Why don't local cinemas prioritize Filipino Films than Foreign Films? Hopefully, it would become a law.)" The film's production companies TBA (Tuko, Buchi Boy and Artikulo Uno), announced on February 15 that the number of theaters had been narrowed down to 33 theaters, at which time the film would be theatrically released.

On February 22, Avelino directed criticisms toward local cinemas and the Film Development Council of the Philippines helmed by chairperson Liza Diño, at which time the film will be pulled out from cinemas. One of his tweets to Diño read:

Mas malala pa pala yung nangyari sa mga pelikula at mga tao sa likod nito na nagbigay parangal sa BANSA natin [...] FDCP (Film Development Council of the Philippines) FILM DEVELOPMENT? Paano? Anong nangyari? (I guess what happened was far more worse to the films [sic] and the people behind it, which gave honor to our country. FDCP (Film Development Council of the Philippines) FILM DEVELOPMENT? How? What happened?)

Diño responded to Avelino hours later, saying in part that "FDCP is working with stakeholders." Maja Salvador would later join Avelino in defending the film from being pulled out of theaters. Netizens who are supportive of the film also promoted the hashtag "#SaveIDILY".

== Reception ==
=== Critical response ===
The film was met with positive reactions from critics. Oggs Cruz of Rappler described the film as "more than just a love story", and said: "[T]he film is an ode to intoxication, whether with alcohol or silly emotions. It celebrates the pleasures of the present, while poking fun at the idiocies of the past and worrying about the future." Mari-an Santos of Philippine Entertainment Portal praised Salvador and Avelino's chemistry onscreen, and said: "The movie is a trip. A beautiful, colorful one that, if you are willing to strap yourself up for the ride, you will enjoy anyway." Blogger Louie Baharom of Live Love Cinema gave 4/5, and described it as "[A]n emotionally sincere wake-up call to the millennials and everybody else who get blinded by affections; a cheery celebration of one’s own youth and the idea of it being something that just bursts like a bubble – all kept at a steady pace that pinches the heart, ignites the soul, and gets us to appreciate and savor every passing second as in life." Philbert Dy of The Neighborhood said, "[The film] exudes a yearning for the carefree days of being young and drunk and in love, all the while acknowledging how that could never last."

=== Accolades ===
Year	Award	Category	Recipient	Result
2018	FAMAS Awards	Best Movie Actress	Maja Salvador	Nominated
2018	34th PMPC Star Awards for Movies	Movie Actress Of The Year	Maja Salvador	Nominated
2018	34th PMPC Star Awards for Movies	Indie Movie Of The Year	I'm Drunk, I Love You	Nominated
2018	34th PMPC Star Awards for Movies	Indie Movie Director Of The Year	JP Habac	Nominated
2018	34th PMPC Star Awards for Movies	Indie Movie Screenwriter Of The Year	Giancarlo Abrahan and JP Habac	Nominated
2018	34th PMPC Star Awards for Movies	Indie Movie Cinematographer Of The Year	Boy Yñiguez	Nominated
2018	34th PMPC Star Awards for Movies	Indie Movie Musical Scorer Of The Year	Jerrold Tarog	Nominated
2018	34th PMPC Star Awards for Movies	Indie Movie Sound Engineer Of The Year	Mikko Quizon	Nominated
2018	34th PMPC Star Awards for Movies	Indie Movie Original Theme Song Of The Year	Basta’t Kasama Kita by Kai Honasan	Nominated
2018	Entertainment Editors' Choice	Best Supporting Actor	Dominic Roco	Nominated
2018	Entertainment Editors' Choice	Best Musical Score	Jerrold Tarog	Nominated
2018	5th Urduja Film Festival Heritage Films Awards	Best Actress	Maja Salvador	Won

== Sequel ==
On October 17, 2018, director JP Habac confirmed that a sequel is in the works and that he was still in the process of finishing the script.
