= Jon Hernandez =

Filipino actor (1969–1993)

- Born: John Leonard Hernandez Salvador; October 9, 1969; Manila, Philippines
- Died: November 7, 1993 (aged 24); Quezon City, Philippines
- Resting place: Loyola Memorial Park, Marikina, Metro Manila
- Other names: Jonjon
- Occupation: Actor
- Years active: 1972–1993
- Spouse: Claire Abad
- Parents: Ross Rival (father); Alicia Alonzo (mother)
- Family: Lou Salvador (grandfather); Phillip Salvador (uncle); Lou Salvador, Jr. (uncle); Alona Alegre (aunt); Anthony Alonzo (uncle); Maja Salvador (half-sister)

John Leonard "Jonjon" Hernandez Salvador (October 9, 1969 – November 7, 1993), also known as Jon Hernandez, was a Filipino notable actor. He was the son of actors Ross Rival and Alicia Alonzo, nephew to Anthony Alonzo, nephew to Phillip Salvador, cousin to Jobelle Salvador and brother to Maja Salvador on his father's side.

== Career ==
As a child star, he appeared in minor roles in movies and several commercials. He was launched as a matinee idol, via the movie Bagets 2 along with William Martinez, Herbert Bautista, Raymond Lauchengco, JC Bonnin, Ramon Christopher and the late Francis Magalona. He joined the teen-variety show That's Entertainment and was a part of its Thursday group. In 1990s, he shifted to action movie genre, appeared in several action films like Nakaukit Na ang Lapida Mo, Junior Elvis, Pita, Terror ng Caloocan and Patapon. The last film he appeared in was Mancao with his uncle Phillip Salvador, which was post-humously shown and dedicated to his memory in 1994.

== Filmography ==
=== Movies ===
Year	Title	Role
1972	Love Pinoy Style	
1973	Fefita Fofonggay (Viuda de Falayfay)	
1980	Pompa	Jed
1981	Sambahin ang Ngalan Mo	Young Crisanto
1984	Bagets 2	Wally
1984	Muntinlupa 1958	
1987	Prinsesang Gusgusin	Andro
1987	Kumander Gringa	
1987	Jockey T'yan	
1990	Target: Central Luzon Bank Robbery	
1991	Junior Elvis: Nakaukit na ang Lapida Mo	Jhun
1992	The Wild Cowboys	Howie
1992	Bukas Tatakpan ka ng Dyaryo	Magno
1993	Pita: Terror ng Caloocan	
1993	Row 4: Baliktorians	
1993	Patapon	
1994	Mistah	
1994	Brat Pack	
1994	Mancao	
1996	Detective: Michael & Jackson	Jacob

=== Television ===
Year	Title
1986–1992	That's Entertainment

== Death ==
After retiring from his showbiz career in 1993, Jonjon and his friends came home from an out-of-town trip. On the morning of November 7, Hernandez met an untimely death when his car crashed into the concrete barrier. He died instantly, at just 23. His remains was laid to rest at the Loyola Memorial Park together with other celebrities such as Julie Vega, Jay Ilagan, Nida Blanca and Francis Magalona.
