= Maja Salvador =

Filipino actress (born 1988)

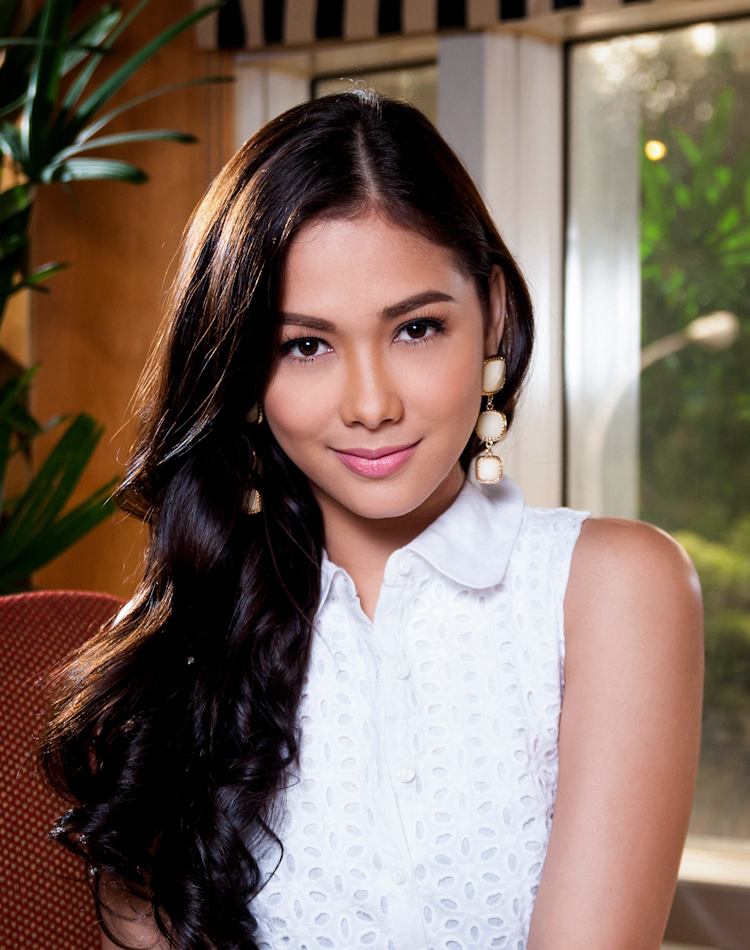
- Salvador in 2012
- Born: Maja Ross Andres Salvador; October 5, 1988 (age 38); Aparri, Cagayan, Philippines
- Occupations: Singer; actress; dancer; producer
- Years active: 2003–present
- Agent: Star Magic (2003–2021); Crown Artist Management (2021–present)
- Spouse: Rambo Nuñez Ortega (m. 2023)
- Children: 1
- Father: Ross Rival
- Relatives: Lou Salvador (grandfather): Lou Salvador Jr. (uncle); Phillip Salvador (uncle); Alona Alegre (half-aunt); Jon Hernandez (half-brother); Janella Salvador (niece); Stanley Pringle (distant cousin); Neile Adams (distant cousin); Chad McQueen (distant cousin); Steven R. McQueen (distant cousin)
- Musical career
- Genre: Pop
- Instrument: Vocals
- Label: Ivory Music and Video

Maja Ross Andres Salvador-Ortega (Tagalog: [ˈmaha]; born October 5, 1988) is a Filipino actress, singer and television personality. Known for portraying strong female leads in revenge dramas in film and television, she has been described by the media as one of the best actresses of her generation. Salvador's accolades include an Asia Contents Award, a FAMAS Award, a Gawad Urian Award, a Luna Award and a PMPC Star Awards for Movies, including nominations from Asian Television Awards and Asian Academy Creative Awards. (Note: Multiple sources:)

Dubbed as the "Majestic Superstar" by the media, (Note: Multiple sources:) Salvador made her acting debut at age 14 in a minor role on the television series It Might Be You (2003), earning her a nomination for Best New TV Personality at the PMPC Star Awards for Television. After playing supporting roles in various films and television shows, she got her first leading role in Nagsimula sa Puso (2009). She gained wider recognition for her roles in Minsan Lang Kita Iibigin (2011) and Ina, Kapatid, Anak (2012). She has since garnered subsequent success and awards for her lead roles in The Legal Wife (2014), Bridges of Love (2015), Ang Probinsyano (2016), Wildflower (2017), The Killer Bride (2019), and Someone, Someday (2026).

Salvador's first major screen appearance was in a supporting role for the film Sukob (2006), which earned her acting awards from the Box Office Entertainment Awards and Star Awards for Movies, including nominations from the FAMAS Awards and Gawad Pasado Awards. Her other notable films include One More Chance (2007), Thelma (2011) for which she won Best Actress at the Gawad Urian and Luna Awards, 24/7 in Love (2012) and I'm Drunk, I Love You (2017) for which she earned Best Actress nominations from the FAMAS Awards and Star Awards for Movies. As a recording artist, Salvador has released two studio albums Believe (2014) and Maja in Love (2015), both were certified Platinum by PARI. In 2019, she was recognized by the National Commission for Culture and the Arts as its first dance ambassador. In 2021, Salvador launched her own management company, Crown Artist Management, home to artists such as John Lloyd Cruz, Jasmine Curtis-Smith and Miles Ocampo.

== Early life ==
Maja Ross Andres Salvador was born in Manila, on October 5, 1988. She was raised by relatives of her mother, Thelma Andres, in Aparri, Cagayan. Her father, Ross Rival, is of Spanish German ancestry. Salvador is a member of a family of actors which includes her father, uncle Phillip Salvador, and half-brother Jon Hernandez.

== Acting career ==
=== 2003–2009: Beginnings and breakthrough ===
Salvador started her career in show business lightly. She played a minor role in It Might Be You (2003–2004), a series starring John Lloyd Cruz and Bea Alonzo. For the series Salvador garnered her first nomination for Best New Female TV Personality. After It Might Be You, Salvador then started appearing in ASAP (2003–2020 and 2024–present). She then started pairing up with other teen actors such as Rayver Cruz, John Wayne Sace, and Hero Angeles for the now defunct teenage television series Nginiig (2004–2006). Salvador, along with Cruz, Sace and Angeles, were all hosts of the series.

She then reunited with co-stars Rayver Cruz and John Wayne Sace for another teen-oriented television series. Salvador became part of the cast of Spirits (2004–2005), portraying the role of Gabby, an overachiever kid whose sunny ways ensures she is liked by everyone she meets. Salvador starred in several episodes of Maalaala Mo Kaya, a drama anthology series, and gained a nomination for Best Single Performance by an Actress for an episode entitled Regalo (2006). In 2006, Salvador made her film debut in the horror themed movie Sukob. She was nominated and won several awards for the movie, including Best Supporting Actress award. It topbilled actress Kris Aquino and Claudine Barretto.

After the success of her first film, Sukob, Salvador then starred in the Philippine comedy film First Day High (2006), opposite Kim Chiu, Gerald Anderson, Geoff Eigenmann and Jason Abalos. Shortly afterwards, she then became part of the cast of Sa Piling Mo (2006) playing the role of Marisa. Salvador gained even more fame after starring in the prime time series Pangarap na Bituin (2007). The series is the 2nd highest Musical Prime Time series after Sharon Cuneta's Bituing Walang Ningning. She then gained even more popularity after starring in One More Chance (2007), reuniting with It Might Be You co-stars John Lloyd Cruz and Bea Alonzo. Salvador received a nomination for Movie Supporting Actress of the Year. Salvador then starred in Susan Roces's Pataying sa Sindak si Barbara in 2008, alongside Kris Aquino, Jodi Sta. Maria and veteran actress, Susan Roces.

After portraying several supporting roles in movies and television series, Salvador got her first leading role in Nagsimula sa Puso (2009–2010). The series revolves around a teacher named Celina who falls in love with her own student. This is the first partnership of love-team Maja Salvador and Coco Martin. Salvador stars opposite Nikki Gil, Jason Abalos and Jaclyn Jose. While also doing this series, she was also, at the time, also starring in the child-themed series May Bukas Pa (2009–2010), with child actor Zaijian Jaranilla. Salvador became a well known name after playing the roles of "Celina Fernandez" and "Stella Rodrigo".

=== 2009–2014: Rising star ===
Salvador experienced career expansion after playing several minor and supporting roles. She became the leading lady of Sam Milby during the 11th installment of the Precious Hearts Romances series. She, along with Milby, starred in the series entitled Impostor (2010). Shortly after, Salvador got another leading role in the miniseries of Wansapanataym entitled Inday sa Balitaw (2010). Salvador played the title role in the inspirational family drama film, Thelma (2011). She received 2 awards for the category of Best Actress for the film. Besides that, Salvador was also nominated twice.

She then became part of the cast in Minsan Lang Kita Iibigin (2011). Reuniting with her Nagsimula sa Puso leading man, Coco Martin, Salvador also starred with Andi Eigenmann, Martin del Rosario and veteran actress Lorna Tolentino. The series made Salvador's profile grow even more. After the successful finale of Minsan Lang Kita Iibigin, Salvador joined the cast of My Binondo Girl (2011–2012) as an antagonist, reuniting for her First Day High co-star Kim Chiu. She played the role of Amber Dionisio, a rival of Jade (Chiu). Salvador then starred in the film My Cactus Heart (2012) with Xian Lim and Matteo Guidicelli, who she once starred with in the comedy-romance television series My Binondo Girl.

Shortly after My Cactus Heart, Salvador then became part of the cast in the anthology comedy film 24/7 in Love (2012). For her part in the film, Salvador was paired up with actor, Diether Ocampo. Their part in the film is about an officer worker (Salvador) and her boss (Ocampo) who then fall in love. The film involved showing some nude scenes including Diether Ocampo's posterior showing with Salvador in the room. She then returned to television and starred in another installment of the Precious Hearts Romances series. Salvador was once again the starring role and the series was entitled Lumayo Ka Man Sa Akin (2012). She starred alongside Jason Abalos and Patrick Garcia.

Salvador then paired up with Kim Chiu, Xian Lim and Enchong Dee in the critically acclaimed prime time television series Ina, Kapatid, Anak (2012–2013). Portraying the role of Margaux Marasigan, she plays the main antagonist-turned-anti-heroine of the series. The series scored a great beginner rating of 25.8%, while the finale episode showed great appreciation from viewers garnering a 42.9% final episode. Following her successful portrayal in the series, Salvador received two nominations for Best Drama Actress for her role as Margaux. After Ina, Kapatid, Anak, Salvador did another comedy film and collaborated with Paulo Avelino and Jake Cuenca in Status: It's Complicated (2013), a remake of the 1979 comedy Salawahan.

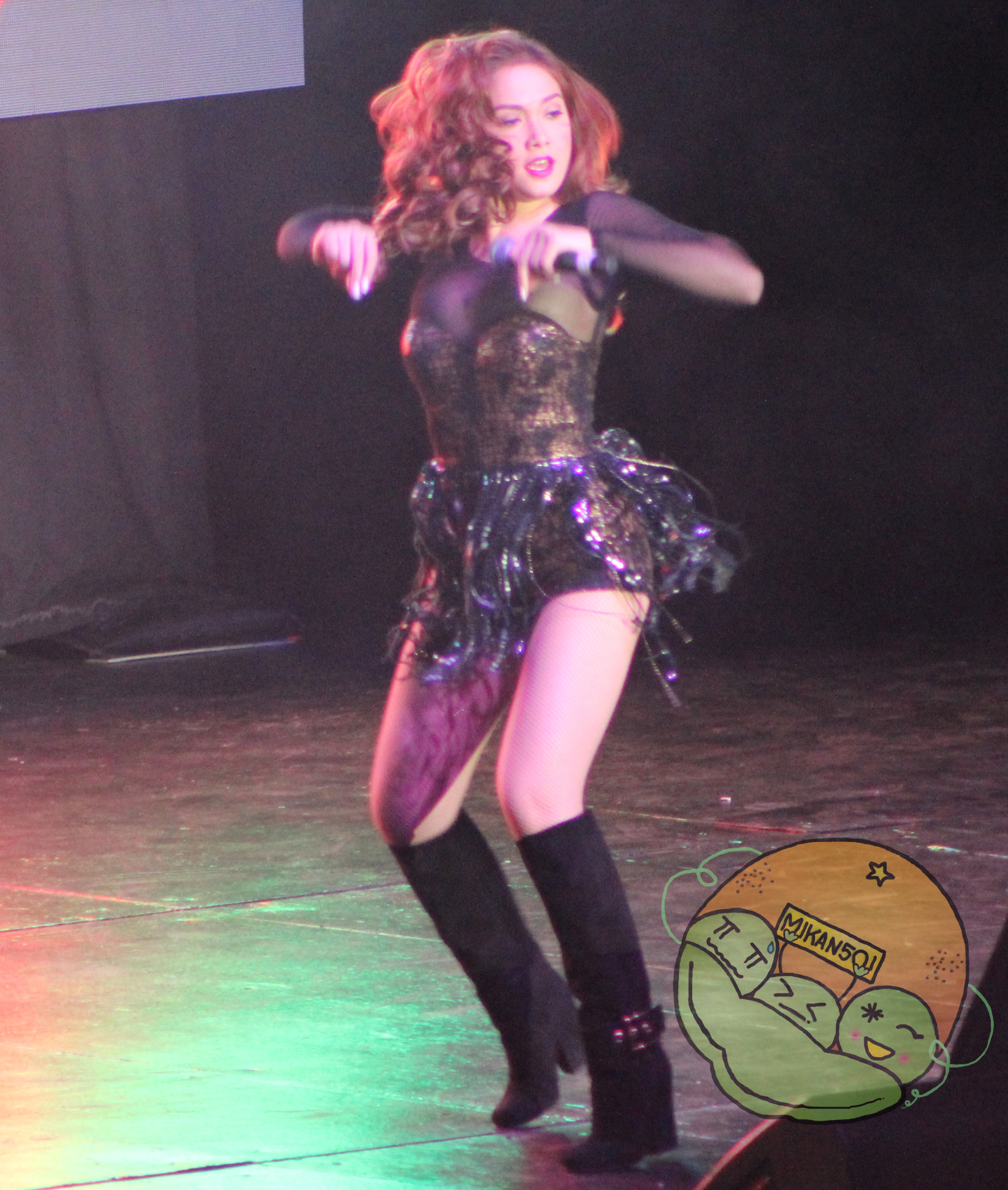
Salvador performing in a concert in Toronto 2014

In 2014, Salvador became part of the highly controversial prime time television series, The Legal Wife, starring alongside veteran actress Angel Locsin, Jericho Rosales and JC de Vera. She plays main antagonist of the series being the mistress of Adrian (Rosales) and rival to Monica (Locsin). For her involvement in The Legal Wife, Salvador got nominated for Best Drama Actress. Towards the end of the year, Salvador starred in the daytime television series, Give Love on Christmas (2014–2015). She did the second installment of the series and it was titled The Gift of Life.

=== 2014–2019: Critical success and recognition ===
After Give Love on Christmas, Salvador's first project of 2015 was the critically acclaimed drama Bridges of Love, which showed in Latin countries including Peru. Salvador plays the lead role, Mia, who is torn between two lovers, Gael and Carlos, who are fighting for her love and are unknowingly biological brothers. She stars with Jericho Rosales, Paulo Avelino, Carmina Villarroel and veteran actor Edu Manzano. The series started off with a great beginning with a 21.9% in ratings and ended off with a 26.9% finale. For her portrayal as Mia, she got nominated once for Best Drama Actress, while winning the award three times in 2015–2016. While filming Bridges of Love, Salvador also starred in the movie You're Still the One (2015), opposite Richard Yap, Ellen Adarna and Dennis Trillo. The story focuses on the life of Elisse (Salvador) and how she is torn by choosing the right man who came at the wrong time or the wrong man who came at the right time.

Salvador then reunited with her Minsan Lang Kita Iibigin on-screen partner Coco Martin for a new project. She starred in FPJ's Ang Probinsyano (2015–2016) opposite Susan Roces, Bela Padilla, John Prats, Arjo Atayde, Jaime Fabregas, Albert Martinez, Eddie Garcia and Agot Isidro. The series is one of the most highly rated television series ever produced by ABS-CBN by getting a 41.6% on its pilot episode. Salvador portrayed the role of SPO1 Glen Corpuz who is Cardo's (Martin) childhood best friend and police partner who secretly admires him. However, in August 2016, Salvador departed from the series with her contract ending. Her character was replaced by Yassi Pressman. She reprises her role for the comedy television series Home Sweetie Home (2016) as Glen Corpuz.

After her character's departure from Ang Probinsyano, Salvador plays the lead protagonist of the series in Wildflower (2017 – February 2018). In the series, she portrays the strong willed and vengeful Lily Cruz. The series occupied the pre-primetime slot, which is before ABS-CBN's flagship news show TV Patrol from February 2017 – February 2018. The series enjoys high ratings with 20.1% for its pilot episode and peaking at 35.2%. The series, specifically the confrontation scenes of her character and Emilia Ardiente (played by her co-actress Aiko Melendez) is popular in social media and had been a subject of several memes.

In 2017, Salvador played the role of Caridad Sonia "Carson" Herrera in JP Habac's critically acclaimed independent film I'm Drunk, I Love You. Salvador's nuanced performance as the film's hopeless-romantic female lead led to nominations at the 2018 FAMAS Awards and the 34th PMPC Star Awards for Movies, and won her the best actress award at the 5th Urduja Film Festival Heritage Films Awards.

In 2019, Salvador returned to TV with two projects, first was being a judge in World of Dance Philippines, before returning to teleserye via The Killer Bride, where she portrayed Camila Dela Torre and co-starred with her niece Janella Salvador. The tale stems from a woman named Camila dela Torre, who in 1999—right before her wedding day, "killed" their mayor and was found by her fiancé in a matching bloody wedding dress and veil. During her murder trial, Camila begs to the court that she is wrongfully accused, but is eventually shunned by her own rich, prominent family and fiancé Vito dela Cuesta who testifies against her. Resulting in Camila's life imprisonment, she eventually gives birth to a beautiful baby girl in prison. Days later, a sudden freak fire encompasses the entire prison facility. Crying, desperate and unable to locate her newborn daughter, her last words exact revenge on every person who falsely accused her, all whilst her body burned in the flames. Also, she was occasionally a guest co-host on It's Showtime when many of the hosts of the show are absent.

=== 2020–present: Professional expansion ===
In 2020, after ABS-CBN was shut down on free TV, along with its franchise being denied and cancelled by 70 congressmen, Salvador joined the Brightlight Productions/Cornerstone Studios-produced show Sunday Noontime Live!, which is aired on TV5 via a blocktime agreement. However, after three months, the show aired its final episode.

In 2021, after 18 years under Star Magic, Salvador left Star Magic to establish her own talent agency called Crown Artist Management. She starred as Niña in Niña Niño. On the first story, Niña was a girl who do not believe in miracles. She thrived somebody's essentials to benefit her and her Lola Belen (Ruby Ruiz) whom born by her mother named Gloria (Lilet) then leaved for a reason due to poor living. After eight years, she returned to Brgy. Consolacion along with his second child Niño (Noel Comia Jr.). Gloria revealed she was beaten by her own husband and she is trying to get away. After sunset, Lola Belen went missing after a long hunting despite that she had died on collision. Meanwhile, in Belen's demise in the family, they are convince to start acted as con-artist for their potential income to the siblings, after that when Niño had a stomachache, Niña had caught by the tanods of the stealing property and both were run out quickly and they jump on a truck which brings them to Sitio Santa Ynez where they live a new life until an unexpected event changes everything. While Niña and Niño escaped through the remote area of Sta. Ynez, they had to find ways in receiving true faith for themselves and connected to healing rituals while they found Ka Iking, they had discovered happy thought for earning big income and return on basic act. This little town was ruled by Kapitana Pinang (Dudz Teraña) who was very strict and interested on making more and more money. Later on they met Isay (Moi Bien). It premiered on April 5, 2021, on TV5's TodoMax Primetime Singko line up replacing Paano ang Pangako?.

On October 2, she officially joined the Eat Bulaga! to host the new segment DC 2021. She returned to ABS-CBN in the action TV series The Iron Heart starring Richard Gutierrez and the romantic comedy thriller series Someone, Someday starring Kathryn Bernardo and James Reid.

== Other ventures ==
=== Music career ===
In December 2013, it was announced that Salvador had signed a recording contract with Ivory Music & Video. While recording the album, Salvador worked with award-winning arranger and producer, Jonathan Ong. By March 2014, she revealed through her Instagram account that the title will be Believe along with its track listing which contains mainly original composition and two cover songs. The carrier single, "Dahan-Dahan", was released on March 6 while the album was released nationwide on March 25. The album also features collaborations with rapper Abra and Project Pinas. Salvador also co-wrote a song titled "Buong Gabi". She released her first single from the said album, also titled "Dahan Dahan".

In June 2014, the album was eventually certified gold for selling over 7,500 copies nationwide and Salvador appeared on ASAP to receive a Gold Record award. She also staged her first major sold-out concert entitled "MAJ: The Legal Performer" on July 12 at the Music Museum. On September 14, 2014, she released her second single called "Halikana" featuring Abra. The same month, the music reached at no. 7 in the Top 10 Philippine pop music chart.

On March 15, 2015, during an interview with Myx, she revealed details on her second album and that its carrier single will be released by the end of the month. On April 9, 2015, a photo was uploaded on Salvador's Facebook page showing herself on set to film a music video for the carrier single titled, "Bakit Ganito Ang Pag Ibig", with actor JC De Vera. The single was digitally released on April 17. Her second album, titled Maja in Love, was released on April 30. It features collaborations with Sam Milby and Rayver Cruz. In November, she staged her second major concert at the Mall of Asia Arena, dubbed as Majasty. She then again staged her third concert at the Music Museum, dubbed as #OnlyMaja.

In 2017, it was announced that Salvador will team up with Thai popstar with Tor+Saksit for a new single. The song, Falling into You, was released on February 9, 2018.

== Personal life ==
In April 2022, Salvador got engaged to her non-celebrity boyfriend, Rambo Nuñez Ortega.

The couple married on July 31, 2023, in Apurva Kempinski, Bali, Indonesia. On December 1, 2023, the couple announced that they were expecting their first child. On June 1, 2024, Salvador announced the birth of her first child, a daughter named Maria, in Canada on an Instagram post.

=== Advocacy and issues ===
In 2013, Salvador joined the PETA campaign to free Mali the Elephant from captivity in Manila Zoo and have her transferred to Boon Lott's Elephant Sanctuary where she can be given better treatment and care. Until her death in 2023, Mali was the only captive elephant in the Philippines and the zoo was considered by celebrities and netizens to not have adequate knowledge or resources to properly care for her.

== Filmography ==
=== Film ===
Year	Title	Role	Notes
2006	Sukob	Joya	Golden Screen Award for Breakthrough Performance by an Actress; Star Award for Movies for New Movie Actress of the Year; Nominated — FAMAS Award for Best Supporting Actress; Nominated – Gawad PASADO Award for Best Supporting Actress
2006	First Day High	Precious Princess Jewel "Pré" Samartino	
2007	My Kuya's Wedding	Kat	
2007	One More Chance	Trisha	Nominated – Star Award for Movies for Movie Supporting Actress of the Year
2008	Kelly! Kelly! (Ang Hit Na Musical)	Kelly	
2009	Villa Estrella	Giselle/Andrea	
2009	Shake, Rattle & Roll XI	Claire	Segment: "Diablo"
2010	Cinco	Rose	Segment: "Mata"
2010	Father Jejemon	Isabel	
2011	Thelma	Thelma	Also producer Film Academy of the Philippines Award for Best Actress; Gawad Urian Award for Best Actress; Nominated – Golden Screen Award for Best Performance by an Actress in a Leading Role (Drama); Nominated – Star Award for Movies for Movie Actress of the Year
2012	My Cactus Heart	Sandy	
2012	24/7 in Love	Barbara Alcaraz	Main role
2013	Status: It's Complicated!	Rina	
2015	You're Still the One	Elise	
2016	Tatay Kong Sexy	Monette	
2017	I'm Drunk, I Love You	Caridad Sonia "Carson" Herrera	Main role
2018	To Love Some Buddy	Faith Buan	
2019	The Mall, the Merrier!	Sisa/Cameo	Guest role, Official for the 45th Metro Manila Film Festival Entry
2021	Arisaka	Mariano	

=== Television ===
Year	Title	Role	Notes	Source
2003–2004	It Might Be You	Cara Victorino		
2003–2020, 2024–present	ASAP	Herself	Host / Performer	
2004–2005	Spirits	Gabby		
2004	Maalaala Mo Kaya: Puno	Teen Miriam		
2004–2010	Maalaala Mo Kaya	Various roles	13 episodes Nominated – Star Award for Television for Best Single Performance by an Actress (for Episode: "Regalo")	
2005–2006	Nginiig	Herself/host		
2005	Maalaala Mo Kaya: Diary (Amnesia)	Nayni Versoza		
2006	Your Song Presents: Akin Ka Na Lang	Kate		
2006	Sa Piling Mo	Marisa		
2006	Your Song Presents: Sayang Ang Lahat	Charmaine		
2006	Komiks Presents: Momay	Momay		
2006	Love Spell Presents: Home Switch Home	Shine		
2006	Star Magic Presents: Sabihin Mo Lang	Celine		
2006	Komiks Presents: Da Adventures of Pedro Penduko	Merrydith Ambing		
2006	Maalaala Mo Kaya: Regalo	April		
2006	Maalaala Mo Kaya: Cap (Tanan)	Lyn		
2006	Maalaala Mo Kaya: Posas (Sapatos)	Angel		
2007	Love Spell Presents: Shoes Ko Po, Shoes Ko 'Day!	Dianne		
2007	Komiks Presents: Pedro Penduko at ang Mga Engkantao	Marie		
2007	Pangarap na Bituin	Kimmy Bautista/Ruby Gomez		
2007	Maalaala Mo Kaya: Pocketbook			
2008	Sineserye Presents: Patayin Sa Sindak Si Barbara	Agnes		
2008	Your Song Presents: Kapag Ako ay Nagmahal	Andrea Rivera	5 episodes	
2008	Komiks Presents: Kapitan Boom	Melody		
2008	Maalaala Mo Kaya: Journal	Jasmine		
2008	Maalaala Mo Kaya: Boardgame (Six Days)	Myra		
2008	Maalaala Mo Kaya: Runaway (Leather Shoes)	Liza		
2009	Komiks Presents: Nasaan Ka Maruja?	Leila		
2009	Maalaala Mo Kaya: Wheelchair	Bernadeth		
2009	Maalaala Mo Kaya: Storybook	Judy		
2009–2010	May Bukas Pa	Stella Rodrigo		
2009–2010	Nagsimula sa Puso	Celina Fernandez		
2010	Your Song Presents: Love Me, Love You	Teacher Glenda Corpuz	2 episodes	
2010	Precious Hearts Romances Presents: Impostor	Mariz Florencio / Devin Ventura		
2010	Wansapanataym	Inday	Episode: "Inday sa Balitaw"	
2010	Maalaala Mo Kaya: Dancing Shoes	Elena		
2010	Maalaala Mo Kaya: Rosas	Bing		
2011	Your Song Presents: Kim	Romelyn	Episode: "Best Friends Forever"	
2011	Minsan Lang Kita Iibigin	Kaye "Krista" Villanueva		
2011–2012	My Binondo Girl	Amber Dionisio		
2012	Precious Hearts Romances Presents: Lumayo Ka Man Sa Akin	Janine Del Castillo		
2012	Toda Max	Darling	Episode: "Darling"	
2012–2013	Ina, Kapatid, Anak	Margaux Marasigan		
2014	The Legal Wife	Nicole Esquivel		
2014–2015	Give Love on Christmas: The Gift of Life	Melissa Francisco	10 episodes	
2015	Bridges of Love	Mia Sandoval		
2015–2016	FPJ's Ang Probinsyano	SP01 Glenda "Glen" Corpuz		
2016	Home Sweetie Home	Glenda "Glen" Corpuz	Crossover character – 2 episodes	
2017–2018	Wildflower	Lily Cruz / Ivy Aguas		
2019	World of Dance Philippines	Herself/Judge		
2019	Hinahanap-Hanap Kita	Helen		
2019–2020	The Killer Bride	Camila Dela Torre / Alba Almeda		
2020–2021	Sunday Noontime Live!	Herself	Main host / Performer	
2021–2022	Niña Niño	Niña		
2021	POPinoy		Judge	
2021, 2023–present	Eat Bulaga!	Herself		
2022	Oh My Korona!	Lavinia		
2022	The Iron Heart	Cassandra	Special participation (guest cast)	
2023–2024	Open 24/7	Mikaela/Mike		
2023–2024	Emojination	Herself	Host	
2026	Someone, Someday	Abigail "Abi" Mercado / Marie Beatrice "Bea" Dominguez		
TBA	Athena	TBA		

== Discography ==
Year	Album title	Recording label	Certification
2014	Believe	Ivory Music and Video	Platinum
2015	Maja in Love	Ivory Music and Video	Platinum

Single
Year	Song title	Album	Recording label
2014	"Dahan-Dahan"	Believe	Ivory Music and Video
2014	"Halika Na"	Believe	Ivory Music and Video
2015	"Bakit Ganito ang Pag-Ibig"	Maja in Love	Ivory Music and Video
2015	"Love Me, Kill Me"	Maja in Love	Ivory Music and Video
2017	"Huling Gabi"	I'm Drunk, I Love You Official Soundtrack	
2018	"Falling into You" (with Tor+Saksit)		Ivory Music and Video
2024	"Sugal"		

=== Believe soundtracks ===
No.	Title	Length
1.	"Kilig"
2.	"Halika Na" (featuring Abra)
3.	"Wala Na Bang Pag-Ibig"
4.	"Dahan-Dahan"
5.	"Urong-Sulong"
6.	"Buong Gabi" (featuring Project Pina)
7.	"Kilig" (instrumental)
8.	"Dahan-Dahan" (instrumental)

=== Maja in Love soundtracks ===
No.	Title	Length
1.	"Bakit Ganito ang Pag-Ibig"
2.	"Habulan"
3.	"Nakawin ang Sandali" (featuring Sam Milby)
4.	"Hiling" (featuring Rayver Cruz)
5.	"Love Me, Kill Me"
6.	"Buong Gabi" (featuring Project Pina)
7.	"Bakit Ganito ang Pag-Ibig" (club music)
8.	"Bakit Ganito ang Pag-Ibig" (instrumental)

== Awards and nominations ==
Awards and nominations
Year	Award-giving body	Category	Nominated work	Result	Source
2004	18th PMPC Star Awards for TV	Best New Female TV Personality	It Might Be You	Nominated	
2006	20th PMPC Star Awards for TV	Best Single Performance by an Actress	Maalaala Mo Kaya: Regalo	Nominated	
2006	YES! Magazine Reader's Choice Award	Next Big Female Star	—N/a	Won	
2006	37th GMMSF Box-Office Entertainment Awards	Most Promising Female Star	Sukob	Won	
2007	55th FAMAS Awards	German Moreno Youth Achievement Award	—N/a	Won	
2007	55th FAMAS Awards	Best Supporting Actress	Sukob	Nominated	
2007	Gawad PASADO Awards 2007	Best Supporting Actress	Sukob	Nominated	
2007	23rd PMPC Star Awards for Movies	New Movie Actress of the Year	Sukob	Won	
2007	4th ENPRESS Golden Screen Awards	Breakthrough Performance by an Actress	Sukob	Won	
2007	Google	Google's Most Searched Female Actress	—N/a	Won	
2008	24th PMPC Star Awards for Movies	Movie Supporting Actress of the Year	One More Chance	Nominated	
2008	24th PMPC Star Awards for Movies	Celebrity Fab of the Night	—N/a	Won	
2009	Anak TV Seal Awards	Most Admired Female TV Personality	—N/a	Won	
2009	Star Magic Ball 2009	Best Dressed Couple with Rayver Cruz	Herself	Won	
2012	30th Luna Awards	Best Actress	Thelma	Won	
2012	35th Gawad Urian	Best Actress	Thelma	Won	
2012	28th PMPC Star Awards for Movies	Movie Actress of the Year	Thelma	Nominated	
2012	9th ENPRESS Golden Screen Awards	Best Actress in a Leading Role (Drama)	Thelma	Nominated	
2012	Star Magic Ball 2012	O+ Star of the Night Award with Enchong Dee	Herself	Won	
2013	Star Magic Ball 2013	Best Dressed Female Star of the Night	Herself	Won	
2013	Golden Screen TV Awards	Outstanding Performance by an Actress in a Drama Series	Ina Kapatid Anak	Nominated	
2013	27th PMPC Star Awards for TV	Best Drama Actress	Ina Kapatid Anak	Nominated	
2014	28th PMPC Star Awards for TV	Best Drama Actress	The Legal Wife	Nominated	
2014	10th ASAP Pop Viewers' Choice Awards	Pop Song	"Dahan-Dahan"	Won	
2014	10th ASAP Pop Viewers' Choice Awards	Pop Music Video	"Dahan-Dahan"	Nominated	
2014	10th ASAP Pop Viewers' Choice Awards	Pop Female Artist	"Believe"	Nominated	
2014	6th PMPC Star Awards for Music	Dance Album of the Year	"Believe"	Won	
2015	46th GMMSF Box-Office Entertainment Awards	Promising Female Singer	"Believe"	Won	
2015	46th GMMSF Box-Office Entertainment Awards	Promising Performer of the Year	"Believe"	Won	
2015	10th Myx Music Awards	Favorite New Artist	"Believe"	Nominated	
2015	10th Myx Music Awards	Favorite Myx Celebrity VJ	—N/a	Nominated	
2015	Golden Screen TV Awards	Outstanding Performance by an Actress in a Drama Program	Bridges of Love	Nominated	
2015	29th PMPC Star Awards for TV	Best Drama Actress	Bridges of Love	Won	
2016	47th GMMSF Box-Office Entertainment Awards	Most Promising Female Concert Performer	Majasty	Won	
2016	47th GMMSF Box-Office Entertainment Awards	Female Face of the Night	—N/a	Won	
2016	HAU's Paragala Central Luzon Media Awards	Best Actress in a TV Series	Bridges of Love	Won	
2017	7th EdukCircle Awards	Best Actress – TV Series	Wildflower	Nominated	
2017	31st PMPC Star Awards for TV	Best Drama Actress	Wildflower	Nominated	
2017	3rd RAWR Awards 2017	Actress of the Year	Wildflower	Won	
2017	3rd RAWR Awards 2017	Ultimate Bida	Wildflower	Won	
2017	8th TV Series Craze Awards 2017	Lead Actress of the Year	Wildflower	Won	
2017	3rd Illumine Innovation Awards for Television	Most Innovative TV Actress	Wildflower	Won	
2007–2010 | 2012–2018	YES! Magazine	100 Most Beautiful Stars	—N/a	Included	
2018	34th PMPC Star Awards for Movies	Best Actress	I'm Drunk I Love You	Nominated	
2018	66th FAMAS Awards	Best Actress	I'm Drunk I Love You	Nominated	
2018	Metro Society	Metro Society Most Influential People on Social Media	—N/a	Included	
2018	2nd GEMS Awards (Guild Of Educators, Mentors And Students)	Best Actress in a TV Series	Wildflower	Won	
2018	1st Batarisan Media Awards (Bulacan State University)	Best Female TV Personality	Wildflower	Won	
2018	3rd Golden Laurel Awards 2018 (LPU Batangas)	Best TV Actress	Wildflower	Won	
2018	4th Platinum Stallion Media Awards (Trinity University of Asia)	Best TV Actress	Wildflower	Won	
2018	49th GMMSF Box-Office Entertainment Awards	TV Actress of the Year	Wildflower	Won	
2018	16th Gawad Tanglaw Awards	Best Actress in a Drama Series	Wildflower	Won	
2018	5th LPU Manila UmalohokJuan Media Awards 2018	TV Actress of the Year	Wildflower	Won	
2018	17th Kabantugan Awards (Mindanao State University)	Best TV Actress	Wildflower	Won	
2018	4th Alta Media Icon Awards (University of Perpetual Help System- Dalta)	Best Actress for TV	Wildflower	Won	
2018	5th Urduja Film Festival Heritage Films Awards	Best Actress	I'm Drunk I Love You	Won	
2018	Asian Academy Creative Awards (AAA's 2018)	National Winner (Philippines): Best Actress in a Leading Role	Wildflower	Won	
2018	Asian Academy Creative Awards (AAA's 2018)	Best Actress in a Leading Role	Wildflower	Nominated	
2018	23rd Asian Television Awards 2018	Best Actress in a Leading Role	Wildflower	Nominated	
2019	Push Awards 2018	Push Female TV Performance of the Year	Wildflower	Won	
2019	1st Asia Contents Awards	Best Actress	Wildflower	Won	
2020	Film Development Council of the Philippines - Ambassadors Night 2020	Honoree - Best Actress Awardee for 1st Asia Contents Awards	Wildflower	Won	
2021	2021 Asian Academy Creative Awards	National Winner (Philippines): Best Actress in a Leading Role	Niña Niño	Won	
2021	2021 Asian Academy Creative Awards	Best Actress in a Leading Role	Niña Niño	Nominated	
2021	Adobo Video Fest by Facebook Watch	Best Dance Cover by Independent Creators Category Awards	Maja x D'Grind (J.LO's Super Bowl Halftime Show Dance Cover)	Won	
2021	Adobo Video Fest by Facebook Watch	Best Entertainment Lifestyle Video by Independent Creators Category Community Engagement	Speaking Ilocana Only Challenge	Won	
2021	7th RAWR Awards	Actress of the Year	Niña Niño	Won	
2021	7th RAWR Awards	Favorite Bida	Niña Niño	Won	
