= Paulo Avelino =

Filipino actor

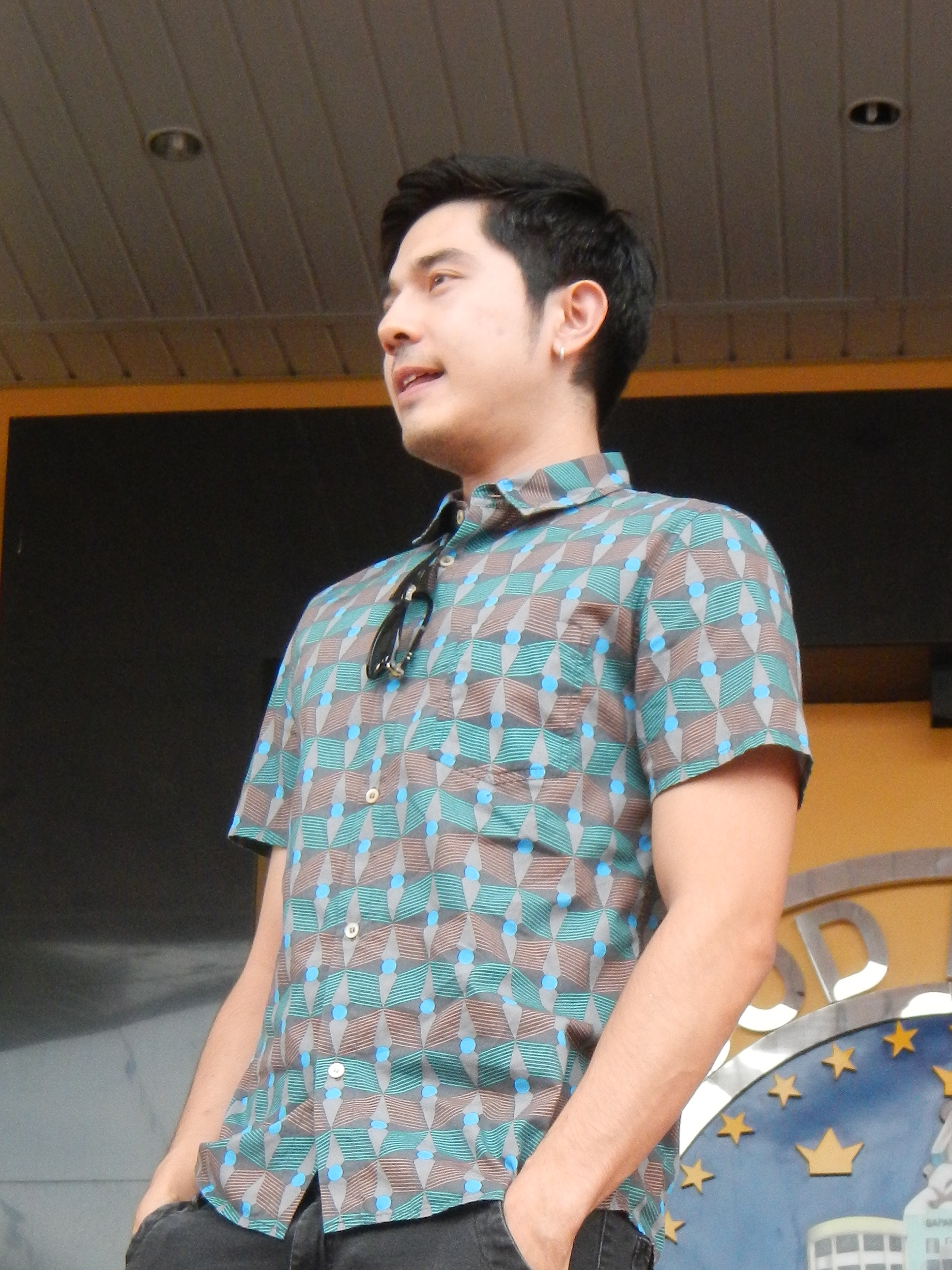
- Avelino in Gapan, Nueva Ecija in 2015
- Born: Michael Paulo Lingbanan Avelino; Baguio, Benguet, Philippines
- Education: Saint Louis University
- Years active: 2006–present
- Agents: Sparkle (2006–2011); Star Magic (2011–present); Regal Entertainment (2008–present); TV5 Network (2021–present); Advanced Media Broadcasting System (2024–present)
- Children: 1
- Musical career
- Genres: Pop; OPM
- Instrument: Vocals
- Label: Star Magic

Michael Paulo Lingbanan Avelino is a Filipino actor, singer, and film producer. He has starred in multiple hit television series such as Walang Hanggan (2012), Bridges of Love (2015), The General's Daughter (2019) and Linlang (2023–2024). In films, one of his best known works is his portrayal of Gregorio del Pilar in the Philippine war epic Heneral Luna (2015), which he reprised in a title role for its sequel, Goyo: Ang Batang Heneral (2018). Avelino's other prominent films include Pagpag: Siyam na Buhay.

He is under the management of Star Magic.

== Early life ==
Michael Paulo Lingbanan Avelino was born on May 13, 1988, in Baguio, Philippines. He is the son of Roberto Puigcerver Avelino, an influential Spanish-Filipino from Calbayog, Western Samar, and Jennilyn Lingbanan. He is a grandson of Baltazar Avelino, former governor of Samar, and a great-grandson of former Senate President Jose Avelino. He has three siblings, Honey, Gabriel, and Angela. He is the second oldest of his siblings.

== Career ==
=== 2006–10: Early career ===
Avelino began his career after appearing on the GMA Network reality talent show StarStruck in 2006. After being eliminated from the show, he signed an exclusive contract with GMA and played various supporting roles for the network. He appeared in the Black Jewel in the Palace episode of Magic Kamison in 2007 and had minor roles in two series, Sine Novela and Zaido: Pulis Pangkalawakan. The StarStruck 4 cast were then given a show titled Boys Nxt Door, an award-winning youth-oriented situation comedy, in which Avelino played Peter. This series premiered in 2007 and ran for 31 episodes.

In 2008, he appeared in a supporting role in Babangon Ako't Dudurugin Kita, a remake of the 1989 movie of the same title redeveloped by Don Michael Perez and produced by GMA Network. He had roles in an afternoon series, Gaano Kadalas ang Minsan, and in a primetime series, Luna Mystika. He also made his debut on film, in Desperadas 2, a Metro Manila Film Festival entry from Regal Films.

In 2009, Avelino started a regular stint on GMA's variety show SOP Rules and landed major roles in two series starring Kris Bernal and Aljur Abrenica, fellow Starstruck 4 alumni: Dapat Ka Bang Mahalin? and All My Life. He was also cast as Robert in a GMA Films-VIVA Films project, Patient X and as Pepe in a Filipino action fantasy film, Ang Panday. In 2010, he appeared in a supporting role in a primetime series Ilumina, and replaced JC de Vera for a lead role in the fantasy series Panday Kids. His last performance for GMA Network was a lead role in the afternoon fantasy-drama Alakdana, with Louise delos Reyes and Alden Richards.

=== 2011–12: ABS-CBN, first starring roles ===
In mid-2011, Avelino transferred to ABS-CBN, known as the Kapamilya network. He told ABS-CBN News that he wanted to get out of his comfort zone and, at the same time, reinvent himself as an actor. His first project as a Kapamilya actor was in a lead role alongside Lovi Poe on Regal Films' Aswang. He also participated in Yesterday, Today, Tomorrow, an entry to the 2011 Metro Manila Film Festival. He appeared for the first time in an ABS-CBN show through a guest role in 100 Days to Heaven, where he took the role of a rich executive named Teddy Ledesma, alongside veteran actor Phillip Salvador. He also appeared in Wansapanataym, Maalaala Mo Kaya and Ikaw ay Pag-Ibig.

Avelino played the role of a bisexual in the 2011 Cinemalaya film Ang Sayaw ng Dalawang Kaliwang Paa alongside Rocco Nacino, winning Best Actor at the Gawad Urian Awards, his first award. He characterized the script of the film as "really different", offering the potential for an interesting role. In 2012, Avelino played Nathan Montenegro in the hit primetime series Walang Hanggan, alongside Coco Martin and Julia Montes. He commented in an interview that he learned a lot from watching Martin act. He co-starred in the "Lost Command" episode of the horror trilogy Shake, Rattle & Roll 14 produced by Regal Films, an entry in the 2012 Metro Manila Film Festival.

In parallel with his acting career, Avelino began to work on musical projects, beginning with a single, a cover of Restless Heart's "When She Cries". His first album, Paulo Avelino, was released by Universal Records on October 1, 2012. It comprises six covers of OPM classic hits, plus instrumental versions of each track. Avelino released a music video for his second single, a cover of Alamid's "Your Love".

=== 2013–2023 ===
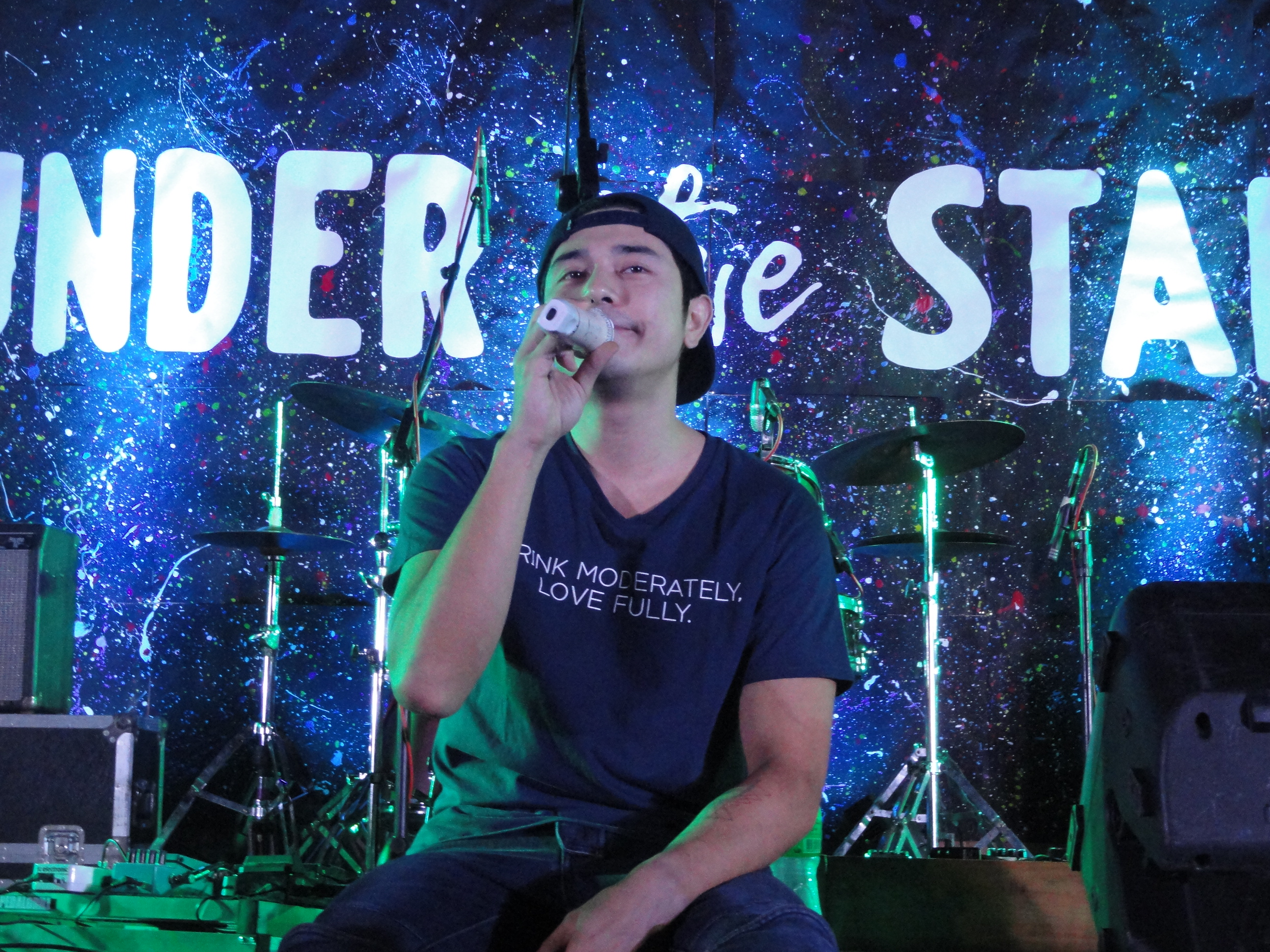
Paulo Avelino at the Ateneo de Manila University, February 2017, promoting I'm Drunk, I Love You.

2013: Avelino's drama series roles included the pre-primetime series Kahit Konting Pagtingin, with Angeline Quinto and Sam Milby; two Maalaala Mo Kaya episodes: "Notbook" and "Mask"; and the family drama series Honesto, where he reunited with his Walang Hanggan co-stars Melissa Ricks and Noni Buencamino.

His film roles included two independent films for Cinemalaya: Debosyon, directed by Alvin Yapan, and Sana Dati, directed by Jerrold Tarog. He starred with Lovi Poe and Jennylyn Mercado in a highly charged erotic-drama romantic comedy film directed by Joel Lamangan, The Bride and the Lover. He also appeared on a romantic-comedy film directed by Chris Martinez titled Status: It's Complicated, with Jake Cuenca, Solenn Heussaff, Maja Salvador, and veteran comedian Eugene Domingo. The movie is a remake of the 1979 classic comedy film Salawahan, directed by Ishmael Bernal.

In the 2013 Metro Manila Film Festival, Avelino appeared in two entries: a lead role on Star Cinema's horror film Pagpag and a cameo in Kimmy Dora: The Quantum of Kiyeme.

2014: Avelino starred as part of the main cast of Sana Bukas pa ang Kahapon, with Bea Alonzo and Albert Martinez. He also starred in Give Love on Christmas, it is a Philippine daytime drama anthology series produced by Dreamscape Entertainment Television with KC Concepcion.

2015: Avelino starred in the soap opera Bridges of Love, with Jericho Rosales and Maja Salvador, and was cast as Simon Evangelista in On the Wings of Love, with James Reid and Nadine Lustre. He also top billed two movies Heneral Luna (lit. 'General Luna') a 2015 Filipino historical biopic film and Resureksyon (lit. 'Resurrection') is a 2015 Filipino horror drama film directed by Alfonso Torre III.

In 2016, He starred in FPJ's Ang Probinsyano (lit. FPJ's The Provincial Man; abbreviated as FPJAP and internationally known as Brothers) a 2015 Philippine action drama television series under ABS-CBN Entertainment as one of the guest Antagoinist. He also top bill the Movie The Unmarried Wife, a 2016 Filipino romance drama film starring Angelica Panganiban, Dingdong Dantes, and himself.

2017: Avelino starred with ABS-CBN newcomer Ritz Azul in the television series The Promise of Forever. He also starred in two movies, I'm Drunk, I Love You, a 2017 Filipino romantic comedy independent film directed by JP Habac, and written by Habac and Giancarlo Abrahan with Maja Salvador and Ang Larawan, internationally released as The Portrait (Japanese: ある肖像画, Hepburn: Aru Shōzō-ga), a 2017 Philippine musical film directed by Loy Arcenas.

2018: Avelino starred in an afternoon series, Asintado as Gael Ojeda and in the primetime soap opera The General's Daughter as Franco Segismundo. He also top billed the two movies, Kasal a 2018 Filipino romance drama film starring Bea Alonzo, Derek Ramsay and Paulo Avelino. The film was directed by Ruel S. Bayani and produced by Star Cinema and Goyo: The Boy General (Filipino: Goyo: Ang Batang Heneral), or simply Goyo, is a 2018 Philippine epic war drama film.

2020: Avelino starred in Walang Hanggang Paalam (International title: Irreplaceable / transl. Never Ending Goodbye) is a 2020 Philippine romance drama television series broadcast by Kapamilya Channel. Directed by Emmanuel Q. Palo and Darnel Joy R. Villaflor, it stars Paulo Avelino, Zanjoe Marudo, Arci Muñoz, Angelica Panganiban and JC Santos. And a Movie Fan Girl a 2020 Philippine coming of age film starring Charlie Dizon and Paulo Avelino. It is written and directed by Antoinette Jadaone.

2021: Avelino starred with ABS-CBN newcomer Janine Gutierrez in the primetime soap opera series, Marry Me, Marry You as Andrei.

2022: Avelino starred in Marry Me Marry you Season 2 as Andrei, Flower of Evil, a Philippine drama television series loosely based on the 2020 South Korean drama series of the same title. And a Movie with ABS-CBN newcomer Janine Gutierrez, Ngayon Kaya.

In the present, he is filming his new teleserye with Kim Chiu and Maricel Soriano titled Linlang, to be seen and watched on the first half of 2023.

=== 2024–present: Career as Freelance Actor, expanding partnership into TV5 ===
Avelino's exclusive contract with ABS-CBN and Star Magic expired in September 2024. As of that year, there were no definitive reports on whether Avelino would renew his contract with ABS-CBN. As of 2026, Avelino is self-managed and working as a freelance actor while negotiating with the Kapamilya Network and the Kapatid Network TV5. According to media outlets, despite not having an existing contract with ABS-CBN, Avelino remains a Kapamilya and is set to work on a movie project with Kim Chiu under Star Cinema in 2025, titled My Love Will Make You Disappear.

== Other ventures ==
=== Business ===
Avelino founded his own film company called WASD films in 2021. WASD first movie project was, Dito at Doon starring Janine Gutierrez and JC Santos which was released on UPSTREAM.ph.

He also ventured into E-sports company. Avelino partnered with LuponWXC, a local eSports company that holds broadcasting rights to several e-Sports tournaments and promotes game streamers.

== Personal life ==
Paulo has a son named Ethan Akio “Aki” with LJ Reyes.

In May 2018, Avelino was in a relationship with Jodie Tarasek, a Filipino-Australian model.

=== Health ===
On March 15, 2024, Avelino revealed he suffered a dislocated right shoulder due to weightlifting. “My aura or look comes with the role I am doing. Here in 'Secretary Kim,' I am dapper,” he explained.

=== Interest ===
Avelino is a motorcycle enthusiast. He owns a BMW Motorrad R nineT and Norton Commando 961 Café MkII. During his free time, he loves to cruise with his motorbike on an open road. Growing up, he saw his father rode a motorbike which increased his fascination with motor bikes. He underwent motor bike training at California Superbike School Philippines in Parañaque. He is a member of Euro Monkeys Philippines, a group of motorcycle conglomerate which promotes safe motorcycle riding.

He is an avid gamer and E-sports competitive player. He also loves cycling, rock/wall climbing, jogging and running.

== Filmography ==
=== Film ===
Key
†	Denotes films that have not yet been released

Paulo Avelino's film credits with year of release, film titles and roles
Year	Title	Role
2008	Desperadas 2	Dr. Anton
2009	Yaya and Angelina: The Spoiled Brat Movie	Cameo Appearance
2009	Patient X	Robert
2009	Ang Panday	Pepe
2011	Aswang	Daniel
2011	Yesterday, Today, Tomorrow	Vincent
2011	Ang Sayaw ng Dalawang Kaliwang Paa	Marlon
2012	Shake, Rattle and Roll Fourteen: The Invasion	Corp. Lamberto Upao
2013	The Bride and the Lover	Philip Albino
2013	Debosyon	Manuel
2013	Sana Dati	Dennis Cesario
2013	Status: It's Complicated	Jerry
2013	Pagpag: Siyam na Buhay	Roman
2013	Kimmy Dora: Ang Kiyemeng Prequel	Cameo Role
2015	Heneral Luna	Gregorio del Pilar
2015	Resureksyon	Javier
2016	The Unmarried Wife	Bryan
2017	I'm Drunk, I Love You	Dionysus "Dio" Brillo
2017	Ang Larawan	Tony Javier
2018	Kasal	Philip Cordero
2018	Goyo: Ang Batang Heneral	Gregorio Del Pilar
2020	Fan Girl	Himself
2022	Ngayon Kaya	Harold
2024	Elevator	Jared
2025	My Love Will Make You Disappear	Jolo
2025	Lakambini: Gregoria de Jesus	Julio Nakpil

=== Television ===
Key
†	Denotes shows that have not yet been aired

Paulo Avelino's television credits with year of release, title(s) and role
Year	Title	Role	Notes	Ref.
2006	StarStruck (season 4)	Himself	Segment: "The Next Level"	
2007	Magic Kamison	Poy	Episode: "Black Jewel In The Palace"	
2007	Sine Novela: Pati Ba Pintig ng Puso	Archie		
2007	Boys Nxt Door	Peter		
2007	Zaido: Pulis Pangkalawakan	Cervano's buddy #1		
2007	Sine Novela: My Only Love	Alvin		
2008	Babangon Ako't Dudurugin Kita	Brenan Salcedo		
2008	Sine Novela: Gaano Kadalas Ang Minsan	Kiko		
2008–2009	Luna Mystika	Johnny	Main Role / Protagonist	
2009	Sine Novela: Dapat Ka Bang Mahalin?	Kiko Claro	Supporting Role / Antagonist	
2009	All My Life	Perry	Supporting Role / Antagonist	
2009	StarStruck V	Co-host		
2009	SOP Rules	Performer		
2009	Dear Friend	Heime	Episode: "Three Bachelors"	
2009	Dear Friend	Luigi	Episode: "Almost A Love Story"	
2010	Sine Novela: Ina, Kasusuklaman Ba Kita?	Cito Valera		
2010	Carlo J. Caparas' Panday Kids	Aureus / Alfred		
2010	Ilumina	Antonio Martinez	Supporting Role / Antagonist	
2010–2011	Jillian: Namamasko Po	James	Supporting Role / Protagonist	
2011	Alakdana	Billy Romero	Supporting Role / Protagonist	
2011	100 Days to Heaven	Teddy Ledesma	Guest Role / Anti-Hero	
2011	Wansapanataym	Cocoy	Episode: "Cocoy Shokoy"	
2011	Maalaala Mo Kaya	Romy	Episode: "Liham"	
2011–2012	Ikaw ay Pag-Ibig	Andrew "Andoy" Jimenez	Supporting Role / Protagonist	
2012	Walang Hanggan	Nathaniel "Nathan" Montenegro	Main Role / Antagonist / Anti-Hero	
2012–present	ASAP XP	Co-host / Performer		
2013	Kahit Konting Pagtingin	Lance Ledesma	Main Role / Protagonist	
2013	Maalaala Mo Kaya	Apaw	Episode: "Notbook"	
2013	Maalaala Mo Kaya	Stuart	Episode: "Mask"	
2013–2014	Honesto	Diego Layer	Main Role / Protagonist	
2014	Pinoy Big Brother: All In	Houseguest	Freeze (Day 52)	
2014	Sana Bukas Pa ang Kahapon	Patrick Salvador	Main Role / Protagonist	
2015	Give Love on Christmas	Christian Cabrera	Episode: "The Exchange Gift"	
2015	Bridges of Love	Carlos Antonio / Manuel "JR" Nakpil Jr.	Main Role / Antagonist / Anti-Hero	
2015–2016	On the Wings of Love	Simon Evangelista	Supporting Role / Antagonist	
2016	FPJ's Ang Probinsyano	Eric / Erwin Maniego	Guest Role / Antagonist	
2016–2017	Wansapanataym	Santino "Santi" Cruz	Episode: "Santi Cruz Is Coming To Town"	
2017	The Promise of Forever	Lorenzo Espinosa	Main Role / Protagonist	
2018	Asintado	Gael Ojeda	Main Role / Protagonist	
2019	The General's Daughter	Franco Segismundo	Main Role / Antagonist / Protagonist	
2020–2021	Walang Hanggang Paalam	Emmanuel "Emman" Salvador	Main Role / Protagonist	
2021–2022	Marry Me, Marry You	Andrei Legaspi	Main Role / Protagonist	
2022	Flower of Evil	Jacob Del Rosario	Supporting Role / Antagonist	
2023–2024	Linlang	Victor "Bangis" Lualhati	Main Role / Protagonist	
2024	What's Wrong with Secretary Kim	Brandon Manansala "BMC" Castillo	Main Role / Protagonist	
2024–present	It's Showtime	Guest / Performer		
2025	Pinoy Big Brother: Celebrity Collab Edition	Houseguest	Pinoy Big Pares (Day 19)	
2025	The Alibi	Vincent Cabrera	Main Role / Protagonist	
2026	Kopino †			

== Discography ==
=== Music videos ===
Year	Title	Performer	Director	Source
2012	Your Love	Paulo Avelino	Universal Records Phil	
2016	Love me Kill me	Maja Salvador	Ivory Music & Video Inc	
2017	Lloydy	Paulo Avelino	Ivory Music & Video Inc	
2018	Susi	Ben&Ben	Jerrold Tarog	
2021	Hindi Ko Kaya	Zack Tabudlo	Antoinette Jadaone	

=== Single music ===
List of studio albums, with selected details
Title	Album details	Ref(s)
Paulo Avelino (EP)	Genres: OPM, Pop; Released date: October 1, 2012; Label: Universal Records; Formats: CD, music download; PARI Certification: Gold	

== Accolades ==
Awards and NominationsAwards and nominations received by Paulo Avelino
Award	Year	Category	Nominated work	Ref.
ASAP Pop Viewer's Choice Awards	2012	Pop Kapamilya TV Character	Walang Hanggan	
ASAP Pop Viewer's Choice Awards	2014	Pop Kapamilya TV Character	Sana Bukas Pa Ang Kahapon	
Box Office Entertainment Awards	2020	Best Acting Ensemble in a Drama Series	The General's Daughter	
FAMAS Awards	2017	Best Supporting Actor	The Unmarried Wife	
FAMAS Awards	2021	Best Actor	Fan Girl	
FAMAS Awards	2023	Best Actor	Ngayon Kaya	
Gawad Dangal Filipino Awards	2024	Best TV Actor	ABS-CBN	
Gawad Lasallianeta	2022	Most Outstanding Performance By An Actor (Filipino Film)	Fan Girl	
Gawad PASADO Awards	2012	PinakaPASADOng Katuwang na Aktor (Best Supporting Actor)	Ang Sayaw ng Dalawang Kaliwang Paa	
Gawad PASADO Awards	2017	PinakaPASADOng Katuwang na Aktor (Best Supporting Actor)	The Unmarried Wife	
Gawad PASADO Awards	2019	PinakaPASADOng Aktor (Best Actor)	Kasal	
Gawad PASADO Awards	2021	PinakaPASADOng Aktor (Best Actor)	Fan Girl	
Gawad PASADO Awards	2021	PinakaPASADOng Aktor sa Telebisyon (Best Actor)	Walang Hanggang Paalam	
Gawad Tanglaw Award for TV	2016	Best Actor	Bridges of Love	
Gawad Urian Awards	2012	Best Actor (Pinakamahusay na Pangunahing Aktor)	Ang Sayaw ng Dalawang Kaliwang Paa	
Golden Screen Awards	2012	Best Performance by an Actor in a Leading Role (Drama)	Ang Sayaw ng Dalawang Kaliwang Paa	
Golden Screen TV Awards	2013	Outstanding Supporting Actor	Walang Hanggan	
Golden Screen TV Awards	2015	Best Performance by an Actor in a Drama Program	Sana Bukas Pa Ang Kahapon	
GEMS Awards	2018	Best Supporting Actor	Ang Larawan	
GEMS Awards	2019	Best Actor	Kasal	
GIC Innovative Awards for TV	2015	Most Innovative TV Actor	Bridges of Love	
Laguna Excellence Awards	2020	Best Drama Actor	The General's Daughter	
Metro Manila Film Festival	2020	Best Actor	Fan Girl	
Net Makabata Star Awards	2024	Net Makabata Star	—N/a	
Philippines Edition Networks 4th Readers Choice Movie	2015	Best Supporting Movie Actor	Heneral Luna	
PHTV Fan Awards	2022	Best Supporting Actor	Flower of Evil	
PHTV Fan Awards	2022	Loveteam of the Year (shared with Janine Gutierrez)	Ngayon Kaya	
Platinum Stallion Media Awards	2021	Best Drama Actor	Marry Me, Marry You	
PMPC Star Awards for Television	2015	Best Drama Actor	Bridges of Love	
PMPC Star Awards for Television	2025	German Moreno Power Tandem Award (shared with Kim Chiu)	Linlang	
RAWR Awards	2018	Outstanding Actor of the Year	Asintado	
RAWR Awards	2018	Outstanding Actor of the Year	Goyo: Ang Batang Heneral	
Seoul International Drama Awards	2024	Outstanding Asian Star	Linlang	
Star Magic Ball	2014	Best Dress	—N/a	
TAG Awards Chicago	2022	Best Supporting Actor	Flower of Evil	
TAG Awards Chicago	2024	Best Actor	Linlang	
The EDDYS	2021	Best Actor	Fan Girl	
