= Alyas Pusa: Ang Taong May 13 Buhay =

1988 Filipino film starring Ramon Revilla

- Official movie poster
- Directed by: Pablo P. Santiago
- Written by: Tony Pascua
- Starring: Ramon Revilla
- Cinematography: Ricardo Herrera; Alfonso Alvarez
- Edited by: Ruben S. Natividad
- Music by: Score
- Production company: Urban Films
- Release date: April 13, 1988
- Running time: 95 minutes
- Country: Philippines
- Language: Filipino

Alyas Pusa: Ang Taong May 13 Buhay (lit. 'Alias Cat: The Person with 13 Lives') is a 1988 Filipino action film directed by Pablo Santiago and starring Ramon Revilla, Alona Alegre, Angela Perez, Paquito Diaz, and Fred Moro. It employs Revilla's usual formula of having his character own a protective amulet in battle. Produced by Urban Films, the film was released on April 13, 1988. Alyas Pusa was given a positive review by critic Lav Diaz, who praised its neutral depiction of ideological conflicts between communist rebels and anti-communist soldiers, though he doubted the believability of the film's premise.

== Cast ==
- Ramon Revilla as Lieutenant Teofilo "Pilo"
- Alona Alegre
- Angela Perez
- Paquito Diaz as Brando
- Fred Moro
- Jose Romulo
- Johnny Vicar
- Lucita Soriano
- Joseph de Cordova
- Vic Varrion
- Robert Miller
- Ernie David
- Eddie Samonte
- Bebeng Amora
- Marlon Borinaga
- Danny Terrante
- Jun Perez

== Themes ==
Alyas Pusa is a continuation of Ramon Revilla's formula of portraying notorious or real-life characters who protect themselves with amulets ("anting-anting") in battle, sustaining a traditional belief of native Filipinos which has endured to contemporary times.

== Critical response ==
Lav Diaz, writing for the Manila Standard, questioned the believability of the film's premise, as he doubted that a communist rebel from the New People's Army would hand over an amulet to Revilla's character. Despite this, he praised the film's neutral and clear illustration of the conflicting ideologies between rebels and soldiers as reflected in reality, accidental or otherwise. He also commended the performances of Alona Alegre and Angela Perez.
