= Kara Mia =

2019 Philippine television drama series

- Title card
- Genre: Fantasy drama
- Created by: Tina Samson-Velasco; Ellie Ortizluis
- Written by: Des Garbes-Severino; Onay Sales; John Kenneth de Leon; Kuts Enriquez
- Directed by: Dominic Zapata
- Creative director: Aloy Adlawan
- Starring: Barbie Forteza; Mika dela Cruz
- Theme music composer: Natasha L. Correos
- Opening theme: "Nakikita Ba ng Langit?" by Golden Cañedo
- Country of origin: Philippines
- Original language: Tagalog
- No. of episodes: 92 (list of episodes)

Production
- Executive producer: Winnie Hollis-Reyes
- Camera setup: Multiple-camera setup
- Running time: 22–50 minutes
- Production company: GMA Entertainment Group

Original release
- Network: GMA Network
- Release: February 18 – June 28, 2019

Kara Mia is a 2019 Philippine television drama fantasy series broadcast by GMA Network. Directed by Dominic Zapata, it stars Barbie Forteza and Mika dela Cruz both in the title roles. It premiered on February 18, 2019 on the network's Telebabad line up. The series concluded on June 28, 2019, with a total of 92 episodes.

The series is originally titled as Ang Dalawang Mukha ni Guadalupe. It is streaming online on YouTube.

== Premise ==
Kara and Mia are two faces in a single body, with Kara in the front and Mia in the back. When they get older, they will discover a way on how to separate their face with its own body every night, while going back to their original form at morning.

== Cast and characters ==
Cast

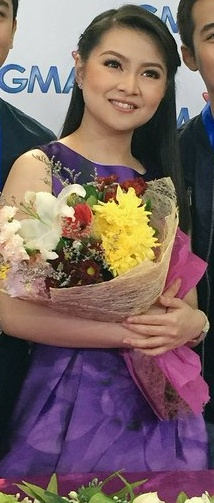
Barbie Forteza

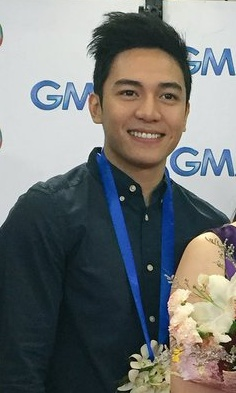
Jak Roberto

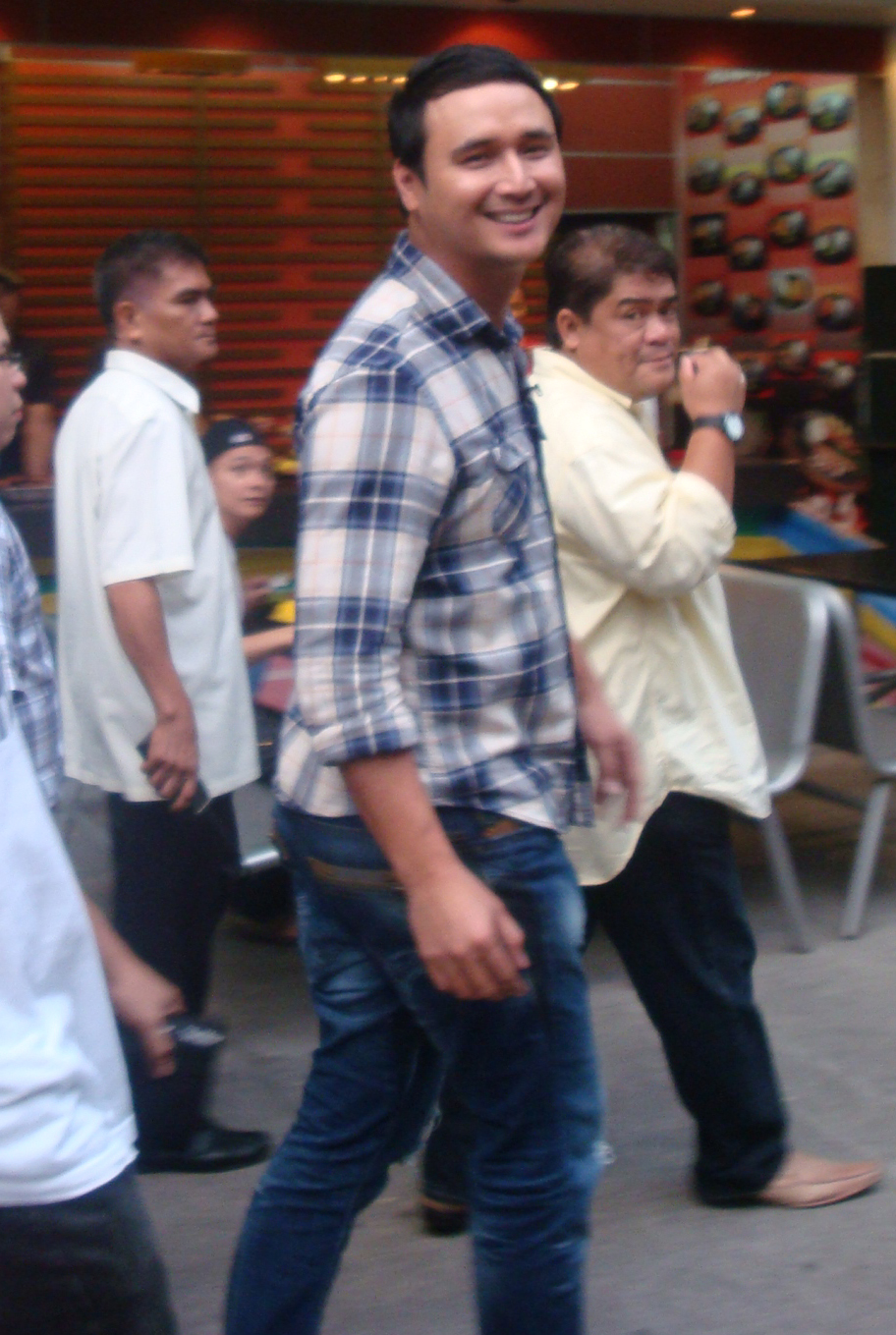
John Estrada

Lead cast

- Barbie Forteza as Guadalupe "Kara" M. Lacson /
- Mika dela Cruz as Guadalupe "Lupe" Machado Lacson / Mia

Supporting cast

- Jak Roberto as Bonifacio "Boni" Burgos
- Paul Salas as Chino Burgos
- Carmina Villarroel as Aya Machado-Lacson
- John Estrada as Arthur Lacson
- Glydel Mercado as Julia Garcia
- Mike Tan as Iswal / Wally
- Gina Pareño as Corazon
- Alicia Alonzo as Asuncion Machado
- Arthur Solinap as Alexandro "Lex" Lacson
- Liezel Lopez as Ellie Garcia
- Althea Ablan as Estrella "Star" Machado Lacson
- April Gustilo as Betty Bahia
- Karenina Haniel as Lerma Jane "LJ" Cariño
- Cheska Iñigo as Madison
- Lui Manansala as Divina
- Madelaine Nicolas as Maria
- Mari Kaimo as Leon

Guest cast

- Rein Adriano as younger Kara
- Sofia Catabay as younger Mia
- Angelica Ulip as younger Ellie
- Khaine Dela Cruz as younger Chino
- Juan Miguel Tamayo as younger Boni
- Sheen Infante as younger Lerma
- Marx Topacio as Tobias
- Ai-Ai delas Alas as Reynara
- Bembol Roco as Sio
- Rob Sy as Val
- Prince Clemente as an engkanto

== Ratings ==
According to AGB Nielsen Philippines' Nationwide Urban Television Audience Measurement People in television homes, the pilot episode of Kara Mia earned an 11.5% rating.

== Accolades ==
Accolades received by Kara Mia
Year	Award	Category	Recipient	Result	Ref.
2019	33rd PMPC Star Awards for Television	Best Drama Supporting Actor	John Estrada	Nominated	
