= Status: It's Complicated! =

- Theatrical movie poster
- Directed by: Chris Martinez
- Screenplay by: Chris Martinez
- Story by: Jose Carreon
- Based on: Salawahan (1979 film) by Ishmael Bernal
- Starring: Jake Cuenca; Maja Salvador; Paulo Avelino; Solenn Heussaff; Eugene Domingo
- Cinematography: Mo Zee
- Edited by: Vanessa Ubas De Leon
- Music by: Von De Guzman
- Production company: Regal Films
- Release date: November 6, 2013
- Running time: 110 minutes
- Country: Philippines
- Language: Filipino
- Box office: ₱25,343,842.00

Status: It's Complicated! is a 2013 Filipino comedy film directed by Chris Martinez, starring Jake Cuenca, Maja Salvador, Paulo Avelino, Solenn Heussaff and Eugene Domingo. The film is distributed by Regal Films, and was shown in theaters November 6, 2013, nationwide.

The film is based on the 1979 comedy drama film Salawahan directed by Ishmael Bernal which originally starred Rita Gomez, Mat Ranillo III, Jay Ilagan, Rio Locsin, Sandy Andolong, and Bonching Miraflor.

== Synopsis ==
Manuel "Manny" Roxas, a playboy chef with a chiseled body and Geraldo "Jerry" Izon, a nerd-looking graphic designer are flatmates and best-friends. The two are embroiled in heated arguments with opposing views on love and sex. They agree to trade lifestyles to prove their beliefs and theory. Surprisingly, Manny falls in love with Rina, a conservative virgin woman while Jerry gets entangled with Sylvia, a foreign educated fashion designer and Marian.

== Cast ==
- Jake Cuenca as Manuel "Manny" Roxas
- Maja Salvador as Rina
- Paulo Avelino as Gerardo Sergio Luis "Jerry" Izon IV
- Solenn Heussaff as Sylvia "Sylvie" Alviar
- Eugene Domingo as Marian David
- Clarence Delgado as Dennis Izon
- Ria Garcia as Jinky
- Bea Saw as Jane
- RR Enriquez as Yvonne
- Marx Topacio as Mario
- Jelson Bay as Mimi
- Madz Nicolas as Aling Baday
- Lenlen Frial as Kyla
- Patricia Lae Ejercitado as Amanda
- Yassi Benitez as Bea
- Lovi Poe as Charlene
