= Give Love on Christmas =

- The title card of Give Love on Christmas
- Genre: Christmas anthology, Family drama, miniseries
- Created by: ABS-CBN Studios; Rondel P. Lindayag
- Developed by: ABS-CBN Studios; Roldeo T. Endrinal; Julie Anne R. Benitez
- Directed by: Various
- Starring: Various; Eddie Garcia; Aiko Melendez and Dimples Romana for 'The Gift Giver'; Melissa Mendez; Jeffrey Santos; Gerald Anderson; Maja Salvador and Levi Ignacio for 'Gift of Life'; Paulo Avelino; KC Concepcion; Melai Cantiveros-Francisco and Jason Francisco for 'Exchange Gift'
- Country of origin: Philippines
- Original language: Filipino
- No. of episodes: 35

Production
- Running time: 45 minutes
- Production company: Dreamscape Entertainment Television

Original release
- Network: ABS-CBN
- Release: December 1, 2014 – January 16, 2015

Give Love on Christmas is a Philippine television drama anthology series broadcast by ABS-CBN. It aired on the network's Prime Tanghali line up and worldwide on TFC from December 1, 2014 to January 16, 2015, replacing Be Careful with My Heart and was replaced by Oh My G!.

== Cast ==
The Gift Giver

Air date: December 1, 2014 - December 19, 2014

Cast

- Eddie Garcia as Ernest Aguinaldo - Laura's husband, Makoy, Eric, Rose, Julie, Mariz, Anton and Louie's father
- Aiko Melendez as Rose Aguinaldo - Ernest and Laura's eldest daughter and Makoy's eldest sister
- Dimples Romana as Julie Aguinaldo-Salcedo - Louie's wife, Ernest and Laura's daughter and Makoy's sister
- Carlo Aquino as Eric Aguinaldo - Ernest and Laura's eldest son and Makoy's eldest brother
- Louise Abuel as Makoy Aguinaldo - Ernest and Laura's youngest son, Eric, Rose, Mariz, Anton and Louie's youngest brother
- Nadine Samonte as Mariz Lopez-Aguinaldo
- Marco Alcaraz as Anton
- Gerald Madrid as Louie Salcedo - Julie's husband
- Alicia Alonzo as Laura Aguinaldo† - Ernest's wife and Makoy, Eric, Rose, Julie, Mariz, Anton and Louie's mother

Gift of Life

Air date: December 22, 2014 - January 2, 2015

- Melissa Mendez as Faye Ramos
- Jeffrey Santos as Robert Ramos
- Gerald Anderson as Tristan Ramos
- Maja Salvador as Melissa Francisco
- Daria Ramirez as Nenita Francisco
- Levi Ignacio as Julian Francisco
- Marlann Flores
- Nico Antonio
- Shey Bustamante
- Angel Sy as Anna Francisco

Exchange Gift

Air date: January 5, 2015 - January 16, 2015

- Paulo Avelino as Christian Cabrera
- KC Concepcion as Anna Reyes-Cabrera
- Miguel Vergara as Josh / Jacob R. Cabrera
- Melai Cantiveros-Francisco as Ruby
- Jason Francisco as Alvin
- Cheska Iñigo
- Jim Paredes as Mr. Reyes
- Ron Morales as Anthony

== See also ==
- List of programs broadcast by ABS-CBN
- List of Christmas films
