= Anthony Alonzo =

Filipino actor, singer, and politician

- Born: Antonio Viana Hernandez; April 2, 1948; Quezon City, Philippines
- Died: October 9, 1998 (aged 50); Quezon City, Philippines
- Other names: Tonio, Tony
- Occupations: Actor, politician, singer
- Years active: 1974–1998
- Known for: Former action star
- Political party: Partido para sa Demokratikong Reporma (1998)
- Parents: Alfredo Hernandez (father); Lourdes Viana (mother)
- Relatives: Alicia Alonzo (sister); Jon Hernandez (nephew)

Antonio "Anthony" Viana Hernandez (April 2, 1948 – October 9, 1998), also known as Anthony Alonzo, was a Filipino actor, singer, and councilor of Quezon City.

== Early life ==
Alonzo was born as Antonio Viana Hernandez on April 2, 1948, in Quezon City to Alfredo Hernandez and Lourdes Viana. He is the brother of actress Alicia Alonzo, who herself is still appearing in Filipino films and soap operas.

== Education ==
Alonzo received his elementary and secondary education at the Marulas Elementary School and Espiritu Santo High School, respectively. He took up Commerce at the Mapua Institute of Technology.

== Movie career ==
Besides the so-called bold and sexy films that pervaded the movie industry in the '70s and early '80s, the period also saw the emergence and proliferation of true-to-life movies. Producers then banked on the colorful and controversial lives of known notorious criminals to come up with profitable film projects, i.e. Nardong Putik, Kapitan Eddie Set, Baby Ama, Ronquillo, Salonga, and Waway, to name a few. Popular actors Ramon Revilla and Rudy Fernandez topped the list of action stars who appeared in one movie after another, portraying infamous and villainous characters. Other stars followed, such as Ace Vergel, Jess Lapid, Jr., Rhene Imperial and Anthony Alonzo.

Alonzo was one of the busiest actors during that time and made a long list of true-to-life movies based on factual events and police records. Stardom came late for Alonzo. He was already 30 when he was given an important role in Hindi sa Iyo ang Mundo Baby Porcuna in 1978, for which he was nominated for the URIAN Best Supporting Actor award. He was nominated in the FAMAS the following year for Dakpin si Junior Bombay! (1979). In 1982, he won the FAMAS Best Actor award for his role in Bambang. He also won the Best Actor awards in the 3 Metro Manila Film Festival (MMFF) for his work in: Bago Kumalat ang Kamandag (1983), The Moises Padilla Story: The Missing Chapter (1985) and Anak Badjao (1987).

== Political life ==
Alonzo ran for councilor in the 1992 Quezon City elections and won. He served for two terms (1992–1998).

== Filmography ==
=== Movies ===
- Muntinlupa 1950 (1974)
- Hide and Seek (1976)
- Tatlong Kasalanan (1976)
- Susan Kelly, Edad 20 (1977)
- Hindi Sa Iyo ang Mundo, Baby Porcuna (1978)
- Dakpin si Junior Bombay (1979)
- Reyna ng Pitong Gatang (1980)
- Diablong Sagrado (1980)
- Kamlon (1981) – Hadji Kamlon
- Hanapin si Jake Romano (1981)
- Dakpin si Pusa (1981)
- Intrusion: Cambodia (1981)
- Totoy Scarface (1981)
- Bangkusay: Tundo-1950 (1981)
- Deathrow (1981)
- Bambang (1982)
- Pretty Boy Charlie (1982)
- Target: Batang Sindikato (1983)
- The Fighting Mayor ( The Fighting Mayor: A True-To-Life Story of Ino Sarahina) (1983)
- Warren Balane (1983)
- W (1983)
- Ang Paghihiganti ni David Burdado (1983)
- Bago Kumalat ang Kamandag (1983)
- Manila Gangwar (1984)
- Sendong Sungkit (1984) - Sendong
- Kumander Cobra (1984)
- Batang Quiricada (1984)
- Diegong Bayong (1984)
- Mianong Magat (1984)
- Mad Warrior (1985)
- Street Warrior (1985)
- Alyas Junior Buang: Mad Killer ng Visayas (1985) – Junior Buang
- Berong Bulag (Terror ng Bulacan) (1985) – Berong Bulag
- The Moises Padilla Story (The Missing Chapter) (1985)
- Manila Gang War (1985)
- Clash of the Warlords (1985)
- Sino si... Victor Lopez ng Bangkusay? (1986) – Victor Lopez
- Kahit sa Bala... Hindi Kami Susuko! (1986)
- Jailbreak 1958 (1986)
- Terror ng La Loma (1987)
- Anak Badjao (1987)
- Dugo ng Pusakal (1988) – Karlo
- Trident Force (1988) – Rashid
- Irosin: Pagputok ng Araw, Babaha ng Dugo (1989) – Police Lieutenant Anthony Dy
- Jabidah Massacre (1990)
- Irampa si Mediavillo (The Final Chapter) (1990)
- Hulihin si Boy Amores (1990) – Boy Amores
- Tawilwil Gang (1991)
- Diligin Man ng Dugo...! (1993)
- Relaks Lang, Sagot Kita (1994) - Warlito Gan
- Oplan: Mindanao (1994) - Berting Paez
- Costales (1995)
- Demolisyon: Dayuhan sa Sariling Bayan (1995)
- Iligpit si Bobby Ortega: Markang Bungo 2 (1995) - Lando
- Matira ang Matibay (1995)
- Angel on Fire (1995)
- Tong-Its (1996)
- ...Ang Mamatay nang Dahil sa Iyo! (1996)
- Masdan Mo ang Mga Bata (1997) – his last movie

== Health ==
It was during this period in 1992 that he suffered from acute gastroenteritis.

== Death ==
He died of skin cancer on October 9, 1998, and was buried in Loyola Memorial Park in Marikina.

== Awards ==
Year	Award Giving Body	Category	Work	Result
1983	Metro Manila Film Festival	Best Actor	Bago Kumalat ang Kamandag	Won
1985	Metro Manila Film Festival	Best Actor	Moises Padilla Story: The Missing Chapter	Won
1987	Metro Manila Film Festival	Best Actor	Anak Badjao	Won
