= List of Kara Mia episodes =

Kara Mia is a 2019 Philippine drama television series broadcast by GMA Network. The series premiered on the network's Telebabad evening block and worldwide on GMA Pinoy TV from February 18, 2019, to June 28, 2019, replacing Cain at Abel. It was replaced by The Better Woman in Sahaya's timeslot.

== Series overview ==
Month	Episodes	Monthly averages
Month	Episodes	NUTAM
February 2019	9	11.1%
March 2019	21	10.6%
April 2019	20	10.2%
May 2019	23	10.8%
June 2019	20	11.1%
Total	92	10.8%

== Episodes ==
=== February 2019 ===
Episode		Original air date	Social media hashtag	AGB Nielsen NUTAM People in Television Homes		Ref.
Episode		Original air date	Social media hashtag	Rating	Timeslot rank	Ref.
1	"Pilot"	February 18, 2019	#KaraMia	11.5%	#2	
2	"The Birth of Kara Mia"	February 19, 2019	#TheBirthOfKaraMia	12.3%	#2	
3	"Tao o Engkanto?" (Human or Fairy?)	February 20, 2019	#KMTaoOEngkanto	11.1%	#2	
4	"Save the Baby"	February 21, 2019	#KMSaveTheBaby	12.3%	#2	
5	"Nawawala" (Missing)	February 22, 2019	#KMNawawala	12.0%	#2	
6	"Rebolusyon" (Revolution)	February 25, 2019	#KMRebolusyon	10.9%	#2	
7	"Obsessed"	February 26, 2019	#KMObsessed	10.0%	#2	
8	"Sinong Tatay Mo?" (Who's Your Father?)	February 27, 2019	#KMSinongTatayMo	9.7%	#2	
9	"Barbie and Mika's Reveal"	February 28, 2019	#KMBarbieMikaReveal	10.0%	#2	

=== March 2019 ===
Episode		Original air date	Social media hashtag	AGB Nielsen NUTAM People in Television Homes		Ref.
Episode		Original air date	Social media hashtag	Rating	Timeslot rank	Ref.
10	"Meet Boni and Chino Again"	March 1, 2019	#KMMeetBoniChinoAgain	12.1%	#2	
11	"Struggle is Real"	March 4, 2019	#KMStruggleIsReal	11.1%	#2	
12	"Pumapag-ibig" (Loving)	March 5, 2019	#KMPumapagibig	10.9%	#2	
13	"It's Complicated"	March 6, 2019	#KMItsComplicated	9.9%	#2	
14	"Conflict"	March 7, 2019	#KMConflict	10.6%	#2	
15	"Engkan-tao"	March 8, 2019	#KMEngkanTao	9.4%	#2	
16	"Hindi Pwede" (Not Allowed)	March 11, 2019	#KMHindiPwede	10.1%	#2	
17	"Face Off"	March 12, 2019	#KMFaceOff	9.6%	#2	
18	"Basted"	March 13, 2019	#KMBasted	9.3%	#2	
19	"Sibling Rivalry"	March 14, 2019	#KMSiblingRivalry	11.0%	#2	
20	"Lumiliit na Mundo" (Small World)	March 15, 2019	#KMLumiliitNaMundo	10.0%	#2	
21	"Pumili Ka" (You Choose)	March 18, 2019	#KMPumiliKa	10.1%	#2	
22	"Planong Maghiwalay" (Plan to Separate)	March 19, 2019	#KMPlanongMaghiwalay	10.5%	#2	
23	"Life Changing"	March 20, 2019	#KMLifeChanging	12.5%	#2	
24	"Hiwalay at Last" (Separated at Last)	March 21, 2019	#KMHiwalayAtLast	11.1%	#2	
25	"Hiram na Katawan" (Borrowed Body)	March 22, 2019	#KMHiramNaKatawan	11.9%	#2	
26	"Selosan" (Envy)	March 25, 2019	#KMSelosan	10.8%	#2	
27	"Sakitan" (Pain)	March 26, 2019	#KMSakitan	10.5%	#2	
28	"Walang Sukuan" (No Giving Up)	March 27, 2019	#KMWalangSukuan	9.8%	#2	
29	"Traydor" (Traitor)	March 28, 2019	#KMTraydor	10.0%	#2	
30	"Public Humiliation"	March 29, 2019	#KMPublicHumiliation	10.3%	#2	

=== April 2019 ===
Episode		Original air date	Social media hashtag	AGB Nielsen NUTAM People in Television Homes		Ref.
Episode		Original air date	Social media hashtag	Rating	Timeslot rank	Ref.
31	"Sampal" (Slap)	April 1, 2019	#KMSampal	9.9%	#2	
32	"It Hurts"	April 2, 2019	#KMItHurts	9.5%	#2	
33	"Agaw" (Take)	April 3, 2019	#KMAgaw	8.6%	#2	
34	"Freak"	April 4, 2019	#KMFreak	10.4%	#2	
35	"Pagputol" (Cutting)	April 5, 2019	#KMPagputol	10.7%	#2	
36	"Buking" (Caught)	April 8, 2019	#KMBuking	10.8%	#2	
37	"Sinungaling" (Liar)	April 9, 2019	#KMSinungaling	10.6%	#2	
38	"Bistado" (Caught)	April 10, 2019	#KMBistado	10.4%	#2	
39	"Kapalit" (Replacement)	April 11, 2019	#KMKapalit	11.4%	#2	
40	"Mia Kara"	April 12, 2019	#MiaKara	11.2%	#2	
41	"Alay na Buhay" (Life Offering)	April 15, 2019	#KMAlayNaBuhay	9.7%	#2	
42	"Run, Kara, Run"	April 16, 2019	#KMRunKaraRun	8.6%	#2	
43	"Paalam" (Goodbye)	April 17, 2019	#KMPaalam	10.5%	#2	
44	"Sisihan" (Blaming)	April 22, 2019	#KMSisihan	10.7%	#2	
45	"Tangka" (Attempt)	April 23, 2019	#KMTangka	10.6%	#2	
46	"Karma"	April 24, 2019	#KMKarma	10.7%	#2	
47	"Tulong" (Help)	April 25, 2019	#KMTulong	9.7%	#2	
48	"Sanib Pwersa" (Join Forces)	April 26, 2019	#KMSanibPwersa	9.3%	#2	
49	"Agawan" (Taking)	April 29, 2019	#KMAgawan	10.4%	#2	
50	"Pasabog" (Destruction)	April 30, 2019	#KMPasabog	11.0%	#2	

=== May 2019 ===
Episode		Original air date	Social media hashtag	AGB Nielsen NUTAM People in Television Homes		Ref.
Episode		Original air date	Social media hashtag	Rating	Timeslot rank	Ref.
51	"Kontrol" (Control)	May 1, 2019	#KMKontrol	10.0%	#2	
52	"Takas" (Escape)	May 2, 2019	#KMTakas	10.7%	#2	
53	"Tao vs. Engkanto" (Human vs. Fairy)	May 3, 2019	#KMTaoVsEngkanto	10.9%	#2	
54	"Showdown"	May 6, 2019	#KMShowdown	11.9%	#2	
55	"Another Death"	May 7, 2019	#KMAnotherDeath	11.2%	#2	
56	"Dalamhati" (Grief)	May 8, 2019	#KMDalamhati	10.6%	#2	
57	"Attack Mode"	May 9, 2019	#KMAttackMode	11.0%	#2	
58	"Pailalim" (Deep)	May 10, 2019	#KMPailalim	10.8%	#2	
59	"Love Hurts"	May 14, 2019 (Note: Episode 59 did not air on May 13 during the 2019 Philippine general election news coverage.)	#KMLoveHurts	11.7%	#2	
60	"Ganti" (Revenge)	May 15, 2019	#KMGanti	8.6%	#2	
61	"Sabwatan" (Conspiracy)	May 16, 2019	#KMSabwatan	10.6%	#2	
62	"Sikreto" (Secret)	May 17, 2019	#KMSikreto	11.0%	#2	
63	"Secret is Out"	May 20, 2019	#KMSecretIsOut	10.0%	#2	
64	"Big Deal"	May 21, 2019	#KMBigDeal	10.8%	#2	
65	"Kutob" (Heartbeat)	May 22, 2019	#KMKutob	11.9%	#2	
66	"Delikado" (Dangerous)	May 23, 2019	#KMDelikado	10.0%	#2	
67	"Iligpit si Kara" (Keep Kara)	May 24, 2019	#KMIligpitSiKara	10.5%	#2	
68	"Bisto" (Caught)	May 27, 2019	#KMBisto	10.2%	#2	
69	"Deep Dark Secret"	May 28, 2019	#KMDeepDarkSecret	10.7%	#2	
70	"Viral"	May 29, 2019	#KMViral	11.2%	#2	
71	"Freak Show"	May 30, 2019	#KMFreakShow	11.0%	#2	
72	"The Shocking Revelation"	May 31, 2019	#KMTheShockingRevelation	11.9%	#2	

=== June 2019 ===
Episode		Original air date	Social media hashtag	AGB Nielsen NUTAM People in Television Homes		Ref.
Episode		Original air date	Social media hashtag	Rating	Timeslot rank	Ref.
73	"Betrayal"	June 3, 2019	#KMBetrayal	10.7%	#2	
74	"Aksidente" (Accident)	June 4, 2019	#KMAksidente	11.7%	#2	
75	"Sabotahe" (Sabotage)	June 5, 2019	#KMSabotahe	12.0%	#2	
76	"Truth"	June 6, 2019	#KMTruth	10.1%	#2	
77	"Caught in the Act"	June 7, 2019	#KMCaughtInTheAct	9.8%	#2	
78	"Walang Sukuan" (No Giving Up)	June 10, 2019	#KMWalangSukuan	9.9%	#2	
79	"Kontra" (Counter)	June 11, 2019	#KMKontra	10.1%	#2	
80	"Unknown Danger"	June 12, 2019	#KMUnknownDanger	10.3%	#2	
81	"Death Threat"	June 13, 2019	#KMDeathThreat	11.5%	#2	
82	"Matira Matibay" (Survival of the Fittest)	June 14, 2019	#KMMatiraMatibay	11.2%	#2	
83	"Kill or Save"	June 17, 2019	#KMKillOrSave	11.0%	#2	
84	"Rest in Peace, Please"	June 18, 2019	#KMRestInPeacePlease	11.3%	#2	
85	"Hiwalay Forever" (Separated Forever)	June 19, 2019	#KMHiwalayForever	11.0%	#2	
86	"Kamatayan" (Death)	June 20, 2019	#KMKamatayan	11.1%	#2	
87	"Betrayal"	June 21, 2019	#KMBetrayal	11.6%	#2	
88	"Huling Linggo" (Final Week)	June 24, 2019	#KMHulingLinggo	11.4%	#2	
89	"Tagumpay" (Success)	June 25, 2019	#KMTagumpay	11.7%	#2	
90	"Final Battle"	June 26, 2019	#KMFinalBattle	11.7%	#2	
91	"Joint Forces"	June 27, 2019	#KMJointForces	11.6%	#2	
92	"Ang Pagtatapos" (The End)	June 28, 2019	#KMAngPagtatapos	12.0%	#2	

Episodes notes
