= Kasal (2018 film) =

2018 romance drama film by Ruel S. Bayani

- Theatrical poster
- Directed by: Ruel S. Bayani
- Screenplay by: Patrick John R. Valencia
- Story by: Kriz G. Gazmen
- Produced by: Carlo L. Katigbak; Malou N. Santos; Olivia M. Lamasan
- Starring: Bea Alonzo; Derek Ramsay; Paulo Avelino
- Cinematography: Mycko David
- Edited by: Marya Ignacio
- Music by: Raul Mitra
- Production company: Star Cinema
- Distributed by: ABS-CBN Film Productions
- Release date: May 16, 2018
- Running time: 115 minutes
- Country: Philippines
- Languages: Filipino; English
- Box office: ₱200 million (worldwide)

Kasal is a 2018 Filipino romance drama film directed by Ruel S. Bayani and written by Patrick John R. Valencia from a story concept developed by Kriz G. Gazmen. Starring Bea Alonzo, Derek Ramsay and Paulo Avelino, the film revolves around a public school teacher, Lia Marquez, who, when deciding to marry Cebu’s most eligible bachelor and mayoral candidate, Philip Cordero, is thrust into working with her ex-boyfriend Wado dela Costa when he comes back into her life.

Produced and distributed by ABS-CBN Film Productions, as an offering for its 25th founding anniversary, the film was theatrically released on May 16, 2018, and served as Derek Ramsay's comeback project to the film studio.

== Synopsis ==
Lia, a humble school teacher, is engaged to marry her fiancé Philip, a city's mayoral candidate. The couple's relationship faces turmoil and challenges when Lia meets her ex-boyfriend Wado, an engineer who reignites unresolved feelings and reveals dark secrets.

== Cast ==
Main cast

- Bea Alonzo as Lia Marquez: A school teacher
- Paulo Avelino as Philip Cordero: Lia's fiancé
- Derek Ramsay as Wado Dela Costa: Lia's ex-boyfriend

Supporting cast

- Kylie Verzosa as Eunice Valdez
- Christopher de Leon as Mayor Ernesto Cordero: Philip's father
- Cherie Gil as Helen
- Ricky Davao as Paul
- Celeste Legaspi as Choleng
- Ces Quesada as Sally
- Vin Abrenica as Arvin
- Cris Villonco as Michelle
- Cai Cortez as Kaye
- JC Alcantara as Michael
- John Lapus as Anton
- Bobby Andrews as Alfie
- Eva Darren as Lola Rowena
- Barbie Imperial as Clara

Guest cast

- RK Bagatsing as Michelle's fianće
- Mark Manicad as Michelle's Assistant
- Victor Silayan as Mr. Ramos' Associate

== Music ==
The song "Tagpuan", performed by Moira Dela Torre, served as the film's theme song.

== Reception ==
=== Box office ===
On its opening day in cinemas nationwide, the film earned ₱10 million, and after thirteen days since its general release, its box office reached approximately ₱100 million.

Aside from its domestic box office results, a report from The New York Times showed that the film entered the Top 20 in the United States box office over the weekend of May 2018, and it earned $329,153 (converted to ₱17.3 million, based on the May 2018 exchange rate) from 57 theaters.

=== Accolades ===
Accolades received by Kasal
Year	Award	Category	Recipient(s)	Result	Ref.
2019	21st Gawad Pasado Awards	Best Picture	Kasal	Won (Note: Tied with Rainbow's Sunset, Bomba, Aria, and Kuya Wes.)	
2019	21st Gawad Pasado Awards	Best Director	Ruel S. Bayani	Nominated	
2019	21st Gawad Pasado Awards	Best Actor	Paulo Avelino	Won (Note: Tied with Allen Dizon, Ogie Alcasid, and Eddie Garcia.)	
2019	21st Gawad Pasado Awards	Best Actress	Bea Alonzo	Won (Note: Tied with Gloria Romero and Ai-Ai delas Alas.)	
2019	21st Gawad Pasado Awards	Best Supporting Actor	Derek Ramsay	Nominated	
2019	21st Gawad Pasado Awards	Best Supporting Actor	Ricky Davao	Won (Note: Tied with Tony Mabesa and Joel Lamangan.)	
2019	21st Gawad Pasado Awards	Best Supporting Actress	Cris Villonco	Nominated	
2019	21st Gawad Pasado Awards	Best Cinematography	Mycko David	Won	
2019	21st Gawad Pasado Awards	Best Editing	Marya Ignacio	Nominated	
2019	21st Gawad Pasado Awards	Best Story	Kriz G. Gazmen	Won (Note: Tied with Ralston Jover and Dennis Evangelista (Bomba), Louie Ignacio (School Service), and Ferdinand Lapuz, Joel Lamangan, and Enrique Ramos (Rainbow's Sunset).)	
2019	21st Gawad Pasado Awards	Best Musical Score	Cesar Francis Concio	Nominated	
2019	21st Gawad Pasado Awards	Best Production Design	Winston Acuyong	Nominated	
2019	21st Gawad Pasado Awards	Best Sound	Allen Roy Santos and Ericson Jordan	Nominated	
2019	3rd Entertainment Editors' Choice Awards (The EDDYS)	Best Supporting Actor	Ricky Davao	Nominated	
