= Alicia Alonzo =

Filipino actress (born 1946)

- Born: Germelina Viana Hernandez; June 1, 1946 (age 80); Manila, Philippines
- Occupation: Actress
- Years active: 1967–2019
- Children: Jon Hernandez
- Parents: Alfredo Hernandez (father); Lourdes Viana (mother)
- Relatives: Anthony Alonzo (brother)

Germelina Viana Hernandez (born June 1, 1946), known professionally as Alicia Alonzo, is a retired Filipino actress in movies and television in the Philippines. She is the sister of action star Anthony Alonzo.

== Career ==
She was a flight attendant for Philippine Air Lines. Her fate took a dramatic turn when her younger brother, actor Anthony Alonzo†, saw an advertisement by Lea Productions searching for a new star.

She joined showbiz from 1967 in Kapag Puso'y Sinugatan, Together Again, So Happy Together, Kwatang: A Star Is Born and Karate Kid.

She appeared in more than 140 movies and television shows up to date including Donata (1968), Marahas Ang Daigdig (1970), Kamay Na Gumagapang (1974), Kutong Lupa (1976), and Roberta (1979), among others. In the 1980s, Alonzo appeared in Uhaw Sa Kalayaan (1980), Bakit Bughaw Ang Langit? (1981) starring Nora Aunor and Dennis Roldan, Santa Claus Is Coming To Town! (1982) with Robert Arevalo, Liza Lorena and Raoul Aragon, Condemned (1984) starring Nora Aunor, Dan Alvaro, Gina Alajar and Sonny Parsons, Sa Dibdib Ng Sierra Madre (1985), Saan Nagtatago Ang Pag-ibig? (1987) starring Vilma Santos, Ricky Davao and Gloria Romero, Tamis Ng Unang Halik (1989) with Kristina Paner and Cris Villanueva. She did movies also in the 1990s Sagot Ng Puso (1990) with Sheryl Cruz and Romnick Sarmenta, Alyas Boy Kano (1992), Warat (1999), and Soltera (1999) with Maricel Soriano.

She was also cast in a classic Philippine TV series Anna Liza played by Julie Vega aired from 1980 to 1986. She also appeared in TV series like Ikaw Lang ang Mamahalin (2001), Mulawin (2004), Lupin (2007), Mula sa Puso (2011) and Maalaala Mo Kaya series.

In 2018, she staged a comeback on GMA Network after four years to play a grandmother role in Kara Mia.

In 2025, it was revealed through an interview with Julius Babao that she has now decided to retire from showbusiness and is now living as a consecrated layperson at the Caryana Monastery in Magalang, Pampanga. She stated that she left her acting career behind in order to focus entirely on her faith.

== Personal life ==
Her parents are Alfredo Hernandez and Lourdes Viana. She is the mother of actor Jon Hernandez, with former actor Ross Rival (eldest brother of Phillip Salvador).

== Filmography ==
=== Film ===
| Year | Title | Role | Notes | Source |
|---|---|---|---|---|
| 1960 | Court Martial (Batas Ng Hukbo) | | | |
| 1967 | Kwatang: A Star Is Born | Fara Diva | | |
| 1967 | Karate Kid | | | |
| 1967 | Kapag Puso'y Sinugatan | | | |
| 1967 | Together Again | | | |
| 1967 | Teritoryo Ko Ito | | | |
| 1967 | So Happy Together | | | |
| 1967 | Nagaapoy Na Dambana | | | |
| 1968 | Bulag Na Matador | | | |
| 1968 | Private Ompong and the Sexy Dozen | | | |
| 1968 | Pitong Krus ng Isang Ina | | | |
| 1968 | Magic Guitar | | | |
| 1968 | Mad Doctor of Blood Island | Marla | | |
| 1968 | Kaming Taga-ilog | | | |
| 1968 | Jingy | | | |
| 1968 | Good Morning Titser | | | |
| 1968 | Giyera Patani | | | |
| 1968 | Donata | | | |
| 1968 | Buhay Bombero | Alice | | |
| 1969 | Brownout | | | |
| 1969 | Batang Palengke | | | |
| 1969 | The Bandits | | | |
| 1969 | Kuwatro | | | |
| 1969 | Rikitik Love Rositik | | | |
| 1969 | Paula | | | |
| 1970 | Marahas ang Daigdig | | | |
| 1971 | Signos Trece | | | |
| 1971 | Tapang Brothers | | | |
| 1971 | Life Everlasting | | | |
| 1972 | Battle of Lingayen | | | |
| 1972 | Ang Gangster at ang Birhen | | | |
| 1972 | Dirty Hari | | | |
| 1972 | Isla De Toro | | | |
| 1972 | Villa Miranda | | | |
| 1973 | Ambrose Dugal | | | |
| 1973 | Digmaan sa Paraiso | | | |
| 1973 | Lupang Hinirang | | | |
| 1973 | Maalaala Mo Kaya? | | | |
| 1973 | Beba, the Mermaid | A-Lai-Sha | | |
| 1973 | Aking Maria Clara | | | |
| 1974 | Bandila ng Magigiting | | | |
| 1974 | Weighed But Found Wanting | | | |
| 1974 | Kamay Gumagapang | | | |
| 1974 | Heroes of Dimataling | | | |
| 1974 | Psssst… Halika Babae | Betty (Sandra's girl) | | |
| 1974 | The Devil's Daughter | | | |
| 1975 | Sangre Montilla | | | |
| 1975 | Concentration Camp. No. 5 | | | |
| 1975 | Maligat Ka Kung Magsaing | | | |
| 1975 | May Karapatang Lumigaya | | | |
| 1976 | Sakada | Aurora | | |
| 1976 | Mortal | Celia | | |
| 1976 | Kung Bakit May Ulap ang Mukha ng Buwan | | | |
| 1976 | Kutong Lupa | | | |
| 1976 | Bong Bong | | | |
| 1976 | Daigdig ng Lagim | | | |
| 1976 | Langit, Lupa at Impiyerno (Pandemonium) | | | |
| 1977 | Tahan na Empoy, Tahan | | | |
| 1978 | Mananayaw | | | |
| 1979 | Roberta | Tinay | | |
| 1984 | Misteryo sa Tuwa | Pinang | | |
| 1987 | Kung Aagawin Mo ang Lahat sa Akin | Yaya Rosita | | |
| 1988 | Nakausap Ko ang Birhen | | | |
| 1988 | Pepeng Kuryente: Man with a Thousand Volts | Aling Rosa | | |
| 1989 | Kung Kasalanan Man | Belinda "Tiya Bining" Rosales | | |

=== Television ===
| Year | Title | Role(s) |
|---|---|---|
| 1980–1985 | Anna Liza | Isabel Santiago |
| 1987 | Kahapon Lamang | |
| 1988 | Hello, Uncle Sam? | |
| 1992 | Maalaala Mo Kaya: Helmet | |
| 1993 | Maalaala Mo Kaya: Sa Kandungan Mo Inay | |
| 1999–2001 | Marinella | Minda |
| 2000 | Munting Anghel | Lily |
| 2000 | Maalaala Mo Kaya: Apples, Oranges & Banana | |
| 2001–2002 | Ikaw Lang ang Mamahalin | Mending Morales |
| 2003–2004 | Twin Hearts | Ceta Saraga |
| 2004–2005 | Mulawin | Rosing |
| 2004 | Ikaw sa Puso Ko | |
| 2005 | Now and Forever: Mukha | Juanita |
| 2006 | Maalaala Mo Kaya: Roses | |
| 2006 | Now and Forever: Duyan | Precy |
| 2007 | Princess Charming | Dra. Elvira |
| 2007 | Lupin | Tiya Nelia |
| 2008 | Sine Novela: Maging Akin Ka Lamang | Doña Leticia Paruel |
| 2009 | Maalaala Mo Kaya: Singsing | |
| 2009–2010 | Ikaw Sana | Tiya Mameng |
| 2009–2010 | Dahil May Isang Ikaw | Doña Victoria Alferos |
| 2010 | Elena M. Patron's Momay | Lola Conchita |
| 2011 | Mula sa Puso | Minerva Trinidad |
| 2011 | Maalaala Mo Kaya: Piyesa | Lola Ester |
| 2011 | Rod Santiago's The Sisters | Yaya Maxima |
| 2012 | Alice Bungisngis and her Wonder Walis | Lola Andeng / Old Matilda |
| 2012–2013 | Sana ay Ikaw na Nga | Doña Victoria Altamonte |
| 2013 | Maalaala Mo Kaya: Sapatos | Lola |
| 2013 | Maalaala Mo Kaya: Diploma | Lola |
| 2013 | Anna Karenina | Zenaida Cervantes |
| 2014 | Give Love on Christmas: The Gift Giver | Laura Aguinaldo |
| 2015 | Pablo S. Gomez's Inday Bote | Lita Vargas |
| 2015 | Nathaniel | Loida Pelaez |
| 2015–2017 | Doble Kara | Barbara Salgado-Acosta |
| 2017 | My Dear Heart | Yaya Maria |
| 2017 | Hanggang Saan | Doña Miranda Montoya-Montecillo |
| 2018 | The Stepdaughters | Felicidad "Fely" Almeda |
| 2019 | Kara Mia | Asuncion Machado |

== Awards and nominations ==
| Year | Award giving body | Category | Nominated work | Results |
|---|---|---|---|---|
| 1973 | FAMAS Awards | Best Supporting Actress | Villa Miranda | Nominated |
| 1978 | Gawad Urian Award | Best Actress | Tahan Na Empoy, Tahan (1977) | Nominated |
| 1978 | FAMAS Awards | Best Actress | Tahan Na Empoy, Tahan (1977) | Nominated |
| 1982 | Gawad Urian Award | Best Supporting Actress | Playgirl (1981) | Nominated |
| 1983 | FAMAS Award | Best Supporting Actress | Bambang (1982) | Nominated |
| 1983 | Metro Manila Film Festival | Best Supporting Actress | Bago Kumalat Ang Kamandag (1983) | Won |
| 1984 | FAMAS Awards | Best Supporting Actress | Bago Kumalat Ang Kamandag (1983) | Nominated |
| 2000 | PMPC Star Awards for Television | Vic Silayan Memorial Award | —N/a | Won |
