= Ross Rival =

Filipino actor (1945–2007)

- Born: Rosauro Reyes Salvador; October 7, 1945; Quezon City, Philippines
- Died: November 16, 2007 (aged 62); Quezon City, Philippines
- Other name: Ross
- Occupations: Actor; Production Manager
- Years active: 1963–2007
- Spouse: Alicia Alonzo
- Partners: Malou de Guzman; Thelma Andres
- Children: JonJon Hernandez; Joseph Salvador; Rosauro Luis G. Salvador; Luchi Salvador Joson; Sahara Shyla G. Salvador; Maja Salvador
- Parent: Lou Salvador (father)
- Relatives: Phillip Salvador (brother); Lou Salvador Jr. (brother); Alona Alegre (sister); Janella Salvador (grand niece); Ramon Salvador (brother)

Rosauro Reyes Salvador (October 7, 1945 – November 16, 2007), known professionally as Ross Rival, was an actor and father of JonJon Hernandez, Joseph Salvador, Rosauro Luis G. Salvador, Luchi Salvador-Joson, Sahara Shyla G. Salvador and Maja Salvador.

His mother, Carmen Salvador, was a Spanish Filipina of German descent, and his father, Luis "Lou" Salvador was a Spanish Filipino. Lou Salvador was a famous basketball player, stage actor and talent manager.

== Early life ==
Born Rosauro Reyes Salvador on October 7, 1945, in Quezon City. His father was Lou Salvador and is a brother of actor Phillip Salvador, the late director Leroy Salvador, actors Lou Salvador Jr., Alona Alegre, Mina Aragon, Jumbo Salvador and uncle to actors Deborah Sun and Jobelle Salvador.

== Personal life ==
He was the father to JonJon Hernandez, Joseph Salvador, former Basketball player Rosauro Luis G. Salvador, Luchie Salvador-Joson, Sahara Shyla G. Salvador and Maja Salvador.

== Death ==
He died on November 16, 2007, in Quezon City, due to prostate cancer. His remains were cremated on November 20, 2007.

== Filmography ==
=== Movies ===
Year	Title	Role
1963	Alias Golden Boy	
1966	Pamilya Garapal	
1969	Ikaw Ang Lahat Sa Akin	
1972	Halik ng Bampira	
1973	Wonder Women	Ramon, the Jai-Alai player
1976	Langit, Lupa at Impyerno	
1978	Garrote, Jai-Alai King	
1984	Julian Vaquero	
1985	Mga Kuwento Ni Lola Basyang	prinsipe (segment "Sleeping Beauty")
1987	Tagos ng Dugo	Pina's father
1989	Killer's vs. Ninjas	
1992	Bad Boy II	
1994	Mancao	Rapist
1994	Ismael Zacarias	Lolo
1995	Omar Abdullah, Pulis Probinsiya 2, Tapusin Na Natin Ang Laban	Congressman's Ampil's men
1996	Hangga't May Hininga	Ramirez' Security
1997	Laban Ko Ito: Walang Dapat Madamay	
1997	Daniel Eskultor: Hindi Umaatras Sa Laban	Alex's Man
1997	Bobby Barbers: Parak	Don Jose's Man
1998	Kahit Pader Gigibain Ko	Sen. De Joya's Security
1999	Burlesk King	

=== Miscellaneous crew ===
Title	Year	Miscellaneous
Halik ng Bampira	1972	In-Charge of Production
Isang Araw, Isang Buhay	1978	Production Manager
P.S. I Love You	1981	Production Manager
Sinasamba Kita	1982	Production Manager
Cross My Heart	1982	Production Manager
Saan Darating Ang Umaga?	1983	Production Manager
Bagets	1984	Production Manager
Bagets 2	1985	Production Manager
Bituing Walang Ningning	1985	Production Manager
Kaaway Hanggang Hukay	2001	Script Continuity
Green Paradise	2007	Associate Director
