= Lou Salvador =

Filipino showman and former basketball player (1905–1973)

- Born: Luis Salvador; July 7, 1905; Tacloban, Leyte, Philippines
- Died: March 1, 1973 (aged 67)
- Other names: Chipipoy, Van Ludor
- Occupations: basketball player, film and stage producer
- Known for: Scored 116 points in a single basketball game
- Political party: Modernist
- Children: 97 (including Lou Jr., Maria Lourdes, Phillip and Ross)
- Basketball career

Career information
- College: JRC

Career highlights
- National champion (1924)
Medals
Men's basketball
Representing Philippines
Far Eastern Games
Gold medal – first place	1923 Osaka	Team
Gold medal – first place	1925 Manila	Team

Luis "Lou" Salvador Sr. (July 7, 1905 – March 1, 1973) was a Filipino basketball player, stage actor, and talent manager. Salvador was born in Tacloban, Leyte, to a Spanish father and a mestiza mother.

As a player for the Philippine national basketball team during the 1923 Far Eastern Games, he scored 116 points in a single game, being one of the few basketball players to have scored over 100 points in a single game. He later became a leading figure in Philippine show business as a talent manager and a stage show impresario.

Several among his 97 children became notable personalities in the Philippine entertainment scene, beginning with his son Lou Salvador Jr., who was dubbed "The James Dean of the Philippines".

== Basketball career ==
Salvador first played for the Philippine men's national basketball team at the age of seventeen, at the 1921 Far Eastern Games held in Shanghai. He also represented the Philippines in the 1923 and the 1925 Far Eastern Games, where his team in both instances won the gold medal. Salvador also played collegiate basketball for the Jose Rizal College Heavy Bombers, leading them to a national championship in 1924.

=== 116 point career high game ===
Salvador's most notable basketball achievement came in May, 1923, during the Far Eastern Games in Osaka, Japan when he scored 116 points during a match against China. With this feat, he became one of only few basketball players to have scored over 100 points in a single game. Salvador would later attribute his achievement to excellent conditioning, recounting that for a whole year prior to that game, he had practiced daily at the YMCA compound in Manila, using a medicine ball which he would throw repeatedly to acclimatize his body. He confessed to finding ease at his achievement during the game itself, owing to his daily practice routine.

== Bodabil and film career ==
Beginning in 1925, Salvador would make appearances in the Manila bodabil (vaudeville) stage under the name Chipipoy, and also as Van Ludor. His sister Miami was also a bodabil performer.

It was after World War II that Salvador attained the most influence in the Philippine entertainment scene. He became the most successful stage show impresario in the Philippines, organizing bodabil troupes that toured the country. Dubbed as "The Master Showman", he was credited with discovering and fostering the careers of such noted singers and comedians as Chiquito, Bentot, Cachupoy, Canuplin, Pepe Pimentel, Diomedes Maturan, and Eddie Peregrina.

Salvador also dabbled in films and established his own production company, Master Films. He was a featured cast member of Manuel Conde's Genghis Khan (1950), which was entered into competition in the Venice Film Festival in 1952. Salvador also directed the feature films Bad Boy (1957) and Barkada (1958), which both starred his son, Lou Salvador Jr.

The Lou Salvador Sr. Memorial Award is handed out by the Filipino Academy of Movie Arts and Sciences in his honor.

== Politics ==
Salvador ran as Vice President under Modernist Party in 1946, but lost to Liberal's Elpidio Quirino.

== Personal life ==
Salvador fathered 97 children and reputedly had 48 women.

Apart from Lou Salvador Jr., he also fathered the actors Alona Alegre, Leroy Salvador (director, producer and politician), the eldest of the Salvador siblings, Mina Aragon, Phillip Salvador, Ross Rival, Chona Sandoval (mother of Emil and AJ Sandoval), and Jumbo Salvador. Jobelle Salvador and Deborah Sun (daughters of Leroy Salvador), Joshua Aquino (son of Phillip Salvador and Kris Aquino), and Jon Hernandez and Maja Salvador (son and daughter of Ross Rival) are his grandchildren. Ethan Salvador (son of Emil and grandson of Chona Sandoval), Analain Salvador, Ashton Salvador and Jordan Lim (grandchildren of Alona Alegre) are his great grandchildren. Singer Juan Miguel Salvador (father of actress Janella Salvador) is the grandson of Lou Salvador's brother Pedro Salvador.

== See also ==
- List of basketball players who have scored 100 points in a single game
