= 2018 FAMAS Awards =

Annual Filipino film awards ceremony

66th FAMAS Awards
- Date: June 10, 2018
- Site: The Theatre at Solaire
- Produced by: Megavision Integrated Resources
- Directed by: Dennis Marasigan

Highlights
- Best Picture: Balangiga: Howling Wilderness
- Most awards: Balangiga: Howling Wilderness (5)

Television coverage
- Network: Cinema One

The 66th Filipino Academy of Movie Arts and Sciences (FAMAS) Awards was an awarding ceremony given by the Filipino Academy of Movie Arts and Sciences (FAMAS), an organization composed of prize-winning writers and movie columnists, giving recognition to the Philippine mainstream and independent films, actors, actresses, directors and production staffs for their achievements in the year 2017. The awards night is also produced by Ms. Donna B. Sanchez of Megavision Integrated Resources.

For the first time, the nominees of the FAMAS Awards were screened and hand-picked by an independent jury composed of well-known academicians, film practitioners and film critics led by multi-titled screenwriter Ricardo "Ricky" Lee.

The awards night was held at The Theatre at Solaire Resort & Casino, Parañaque on 10 June 2018. It was shown on Cinema One on 30 June 2018 and hosted by Piolo Pascual, Kim Chiu, and Robi Domingo.

The film Balangiga: Howling Wilderness won the majority of the awards including the coveted Best Picture, Best Production Design, Best Cinematography, Best Original Screenplay and Best Original Song awards. Agot Isidro took home the Best Actress award, while Allen Dizon scored the Best Actor award.

== Awards ==
=== Major Awards ===
Winners are listed first and highlighted with boldface.

Best Picture	Best Director
**Balangiga: Howling Wilderness**; 1st Place: Grand Jury Prize: Tu Pug Imatuy (The Right to Kill); 2nd Place: Grand Jury Prize: Respeto; Ang Larawan; Birdshot; Love You to the Stars and Back; Nervous Translation; Paki; Tha Chanters; Yield	**Arnel Barbarona (Tu Pug Imatuy)**; Khavan dela Cruz for (Balangiga: Howling Wilderness); Mikhail Red for Birdshot; Top Nazareno for Kiko Boksingero; Antoinetee Jadaone for Love You To the Stars and Back; Shireen Seño for Nervous Translation; Treb Monters for Respeto; Arnel Barbarona for Tu Pug Imatuy; Victor Delotavo Tagaro/Toshihiko Uriu for Yield
Best Actor	Best Actress
**Allen Dizon (Bomba)**; Justine Samson for Balangiga: Howling Wilderness; Jojit Lorenzo for Changing Partners; Noel Comia for Kiko Boksingero; Joshua Garcia for Love You To the Stars and Back; Timothy Castillo for Neomanila; Abra for Respeto; Dingdong Dantes for Seven Sundays; Nonie Buencamino for Smaller and Smaller Circles; Bembol Roco What Home Feels Like	**Agot Isidro (Changing Partners)**; Joanna Ampil for Ang Larawan; Angeli Bayani for Bagahe; Iza Calzado for Bliss; Nathalie Hart for Histograpika Errata; Maja Salvador for I'm Drunk, I Love You; Max Eigenmann for Kulay Lila ang Gabi na Binudburan pa ng mga Bituin; Julia Barretto for Love You To the Stars and Back; Dexter Doria for Paki; Gloria Diaz for Si Apple at si Chedeng
Best Supporting Actor	Best Supporting Actress
**Mon Confiado (Mga Gabing Kasinghaba ng Hair Ko)**; Robert Arevalo for Ang Larawan; John Arcilla for Birdshot; Edgar Allan Guzman for Deadma Walking; Ricky Davao for Paki; Dido dela Paz for Respeto; Loonie for Respeto; Jess Mendoza for Sa Gabing Nanahimik Ang mga Kuliglig; Aga Muhlach for Seven Sundays	**Odette Khan (Bar Boys)**; Adrienne Vegara for Bliss; Angeli Sanoy for Bomba; Chai Fonacier for Respeto; Yayo Aguila for Kiko Boksingero; Thea Yrastorza for Respeto; Cristine Reyes for Seven Sundays; Irma Adlawan for What Home Feels Like
Best Original Screenplay	Best Adapted Screenplay
**Khav, Achinette Villamor, Jerry Gracio (Balangiga: Howling Wilderness)**; Jason Paul Laxamana for Instalado; Antoinette Jadaone for Love You To The Stars and Back; Gian Carlo Abrahan for Paki; Treb Monteras II & Njel de Mesa for Respeto; Fatrick Tabada for Si Chedeng at si Apple; Adrian Legaspi & John Bedia for The Chanters	**Vincent de Jesus and Lilit Reyes (based on the musical of the same title) (Changing Partners)**
Best Cinematography	Best Production Design
**Albert Banzon (Balangiga: Howling Wilderness)**	**Marija Vicente, Timmy Harn and Zeus Bascon (Balangiga: Howling Wilderness)**
Best Editing	Best Sound
**Victor Delotavo Tagaro (Yield)**	**Mikko Quizon, Jason Conanan, Kathrine Salinas, John Perez (Nervous Translation)**
Best Musical Score	Best Visual Effects
**Mikko Quizon, Jason Conanan, Kathrine Salinas, John Perez (Nervous Translation)**	**Iar Arondaing (Instalado)**
Best Original Song	Best Short Film
**Katurog Na by Lolita Carbon (Instalado)**	**Hilom**; Grand Jury Prize: Ailens Ata and Dory
Best Documentary Film
**Yield**

=== Special awards ===
**Comedy King Dolphy Memorial Award**

- Vice Ganda

**FAMAS Lifetime Achievement Award**

- Lav Diaz

**Fernando Poe, Jr. Award**

- Coco Martin

**German Moreno Youth Achievement Award**

- Awra Briguela and Julie Anne San Jose

**Special Citation**

- Rosa Rosal

**Dr. Jose Perez Memorial Award for Journalism**

- Ambet Nabus

**Male and Female Celebrity of the Night**

- Joshua Garcia and Julia Barretto

**Male and Female Face of the Night**

- JC Santos and Max Eigenmann
