= Bridges of Love =

2015 Philippine television drama series

- Title card
- Genre: Drama; Romance; Suspense
- Created by: ABS-CBN Studios; Henry King Quitain
- Developed by: ABS-CBN Studios; Malou N. Santos; Des M. de Guzman
- Written by: G3 San Diego; Enrique S. Villasis; Mary Pearl Urtola; BJ Lingan
- Directed by: Richard V. Somes; Dado C. Lumibao; Will S. Fredo; Richard I. Arellano
- Creative director: Johnny Santos
- Starring: Maja Salvador; Jericho Rosales; Paulo Avelino
- Opening theme: "Pusong Ligaw" by Michael Pangilinan
- Composer: Jericho Rosales
- Country of origin: Philippines
- Original language: Filipino/Tagalog
- No. of episodes: 103

Production
- Executive producers: Carlo Katigbak; Cory Vidanes; Laurenti Dyogi; Malou Santos; Des De Guzman
- Producers: Myleen H. Ongkiko; Kristine P. Sioson
- Production locations: Metro Manila, Philippines; Tokyo, Japan; Saudi Arabia
- Editors: Bernie Diasanta; Rommel Malimban; Alexces Megan Abarquez; Frances Aileen del Carmen-Guiang; Froilan Francia
- Running time: 30-45 minutes
- Production company: Star Creatives

Original release
- Network: ABS-CBN
- Release: March 16 – August 7, 2015

Bridges of Love is a 2015 Philippine television drama romance series broadcast by ABS-CBN. Directed by Richard V. Somes, Dado C. Lumibao, Will S. Fredo and Richard I. Arellano, it stars Jericho Rosales, Paulo Avelino and Maja Salvador. It aired on the network's Primetime Bida line up and worldwide on TFC from March 16 to August 7, 2015, replacing Two Wives and was replaced by On the Wings of Love.

== Synopsis ==
The story follows the lives of two brothers, Gael and Carlos, bound by their promise to support each other, but separated by an unfortunate accident. Carlos is adopted by a wealthy architect and developer and grows up in wealth. Gael returns to his parents who are poor. He grows up to fulfill his dream of building bridges and becomes a successful and sought after engineer. They cross paths as adults but do not recognize each other. They will be bridged together by love for the same lady-of-interest—Mia, who is Gael's greatest love, and the woman who completes Carlos' broken heart.

== Cast and characters ==
=== Main cast ===
- Maja Salvador as Mia Sandoval
- Paulo Avelino as Carlos Antonio / Manuel "JR" Nakpil Jr.
- Jericho Rosales as Gabriel "Gael" Nakpil

=== Supporting cast ===
- Edu Manzano as Lorenzo Antonio
- Carmina Villarroel as Alexa Meyers Antonio
- Antoinette Taus as Arch. Camille Panlilio
- Janus del Prado as Romulo "Muloy" Angeles
- Isabel Oli-Prats as Atty. Malaya Cabrera-Nakpil
- Lito Pimentel as Manuel Nakpil Sr.
- Maureen Mauricio as Marilen Mendoza-Nakpil
- Malou de Guzman as Manang Vida
- William Lorenzo as Ramon Sandoval
- Max Eigenmann as Georgina Calix
- Justin Cuyugan as Henson Lee
- John Manalo as Manuel "Tres" Nakpil, III
- Jopay Paguia as Venus de Castro
- Joross Gamboa as Toto Rosales
- Marilyn Villamayor as Chanda de Castro
- Manuel Chua as Abner Carillo
- Nikka Valencia as Tiyang Des Carillo

=== Guest cast ===
- Bugoy Cariño as young Gabriel "Gael" Nakpil
- Izzy Canillo as young Manuel "JR" Nakpil Jr.
- Desiree del Valle as young Marilen Mendoza-Nakpil
- Jason Abalos as young Manuel Nakpil Sr.
- Baron Geisler as young Lorenzo Antonio
- Grae Fernandez as teenage Manuel "JR" Nakpil Jr. / Carlos Antonio
- Jairus Aquino as teenage Gabriel "Gael" Nakpil
- Lance Lucido as young Romulo "Muloy" Angeles
- Jerould Aceron as teenage Romulo "Muloy" Angeles
- Janice Jurado as Nancy Angeles
- Encar Benedicto as Teacher Yolly
- Kyle Blanco as Kyle
- Lorenzo Mara as Tony Meyers
- Toby Alejar as Robert Panlilio
- Alvin Anson as Willy
- Carla Humphries as Ivanka Valera
- Hiyasmin Neri as Priscilla Angeles
- Lei Andrei Navarro as Wolfgang Angeles
- Jordan Herrera as Bernard Briones
- Johan Santos as Enrique Hidalgo
- AJ Dee as Louie Sandejas
- Menggie Cobarrubias as Chairman Luna
- Bing Davao as Robert Torralba
- Eda Nolan as Michelle
- Maria Isabel Lopez as Veronica Sandoval
- Niña Dolino as young Veronica
- Akiko Solon as Alisa Almeda
- Charles Christianson as Eugene
- Inez Bernardo as Ms. Pierre
- Mike Lloren as Raffy
- Ces Aldaba as Malaya's grandfather

== Soundtrack ==
- Pusong Ligaw - Michael Pangilinan
- Ikaw Na Nga - Daryl Ong

== Re-runs ==
It aired re-runs on Jeepney TV from April 2 to June 8, 2018 (replacing the re-runs of Meteor Garden II); June 16 to September 22, 2018 (as recap); October 21 to December 27, 2019 (replacing the re-runs of The Legal Wife); January 2 to March 10, 2023 (replacing the re-runs of Apoy sa Dagat); and November 1, 2026 to February 21, 2027 (replacing the re-runs of Tubig at Langis).

== International broadcast ==
- The series was aired in Indonesia on MNCTV and dubbed in Indonesian, one of the main commercial TV networks of the country from February 17, 2017.

== Production ==
Dubbed as "a story like no other", Bridges of Love is a soap opera directed by Dado Lumibao of the critically acclaimed melodrama, The Legal Wife, and Richard Somes of the highly successful horror-fantasy drama, Imortal. It is written by G3 San Diego from Magkaribal, and head writer Benjamin Lingan from Apoy sa Dagat. Filming of the series began on September 12, 2014.

During commercial gap of the romantic-comedy series, Forevermore, the teaser released on February 18, 2015, and the full trailer premiered on February 25, 2015.

=== Casting ===
Prior to its unveiling, the soap opera made headlines because of changes in its casting. John Lloyd Cruz was originally part of the main cast, who at the time could not commit as he had yet to renew his contract with ABS-CBN. Cruz was later replaced by Xian Lim, but was eventually reassigned by management to co-star anew with Kim Chiu for a third series together. On January 10, 2015, Lim was officially replaced by Paulo Avelino. This was Avelino second time playing an antagonist role since Walang Haggan in 2012.

The series marks the reunion of Rosales and Salvador, who previously starred together as husband and mistress respectively in The Legal Wife in 2014. It is also the first team-up of Rosales, Avelino, and Salvador as previous Gawad Urian awardees. Meanwhile, the soap opera is Edu Manzano and Antoinette Taus' comeback project as returning Kapamilya stars. Meanwhile, this is Carmina Villarroel's return to primetime after the success of Got to Believe in 2013, opposite Kathryn Bernardo and Daniel Padilla, the series ended on March 7, 2014.

== Reception ==
=== Ratings ===
Kantar Media National TV Ratings (9:15 PM PST)
Pilot Episode	Finale Episode	Peak	Average
21.9% March 16, 2015	26.9% August 7, 2015	28.3% July 23, 2015	25.7%

=== Awards and recognitions ===
Year	Award	Category	Recipient	Result
2015	1st GIC Innovative Awards for TV	Most Innovative TV Actor 2015	Paulo Avelino	Won
2015	29th PMPC Star Awards for Television	Best Primetime Drama Series	Bridges of Love	Won
2015	29th PMPC Star Awards for Television	Best Drama Actress	Maja Salvador	Won
2015	29th PMPC Star Awards for Television	Best Drama Actor	Paulo Avelino	Nominated
2015	Golden Screen TV Awards	Outstanding Performance by an Actress in a Drama Program	Maja Salvador	Nominated
2015	HAU's Paragala Central Luzon Media Awards	Best Actress in a TV Series	Maja Salvador	Won
2016	14th Gawad Tanglaw Award 2016	Best Drama Actor	Paulo Avelino	Won
2016	44th International Emmy Awards	International Emmy Award for best telenovela	Bridges of Love	Nominated

== See also ==
- List of programs broadcast by ABS-CBN
- List of ABS-CBN Studios original drama series
- List of programs broadcast by Jeepney TV
