= Alona Alegre =

Filipino film actress (1948-2018)

- Alegre in 1977
- Born: Maria Lourdes Jalandoni Salvador; January 1, 1948; Manila, Philippines
- Died: December 9, 2018 (aged 70); Philippines
- Other names: Alona Alegre Salvador
- Occupations: Actress; Director
- Years active: 1955–2018
- Parents: Lou Salvador (father); Inday Jalandoni (mother)

Maria Lourdes Jalandoni Salvador (January 1, 1948 – December 9, 2018), better known by her stage name Alona Alegre, was a Filipino film actress. Her parents were the stage impresario Lou Salvador and LVN actress Inday Jalandoni. She was among the 102 children fathered by Lou Salvador whose notable progeny includes Lou Salvador Jr., Phillip Salvador and Ross Rival. She made her film debut as a seven-year-old child star in the 1955 movie Tagapagmana under LVN Pictures.

Alegre was a Marcos loyalist, having participated in two coup attempts against the Aquino administration.

== Life ==
Salvador was born in the Philippines in 1948. She died on December 9, 2018.

== Political views; participation in coup attempts ==
Salvador was a fervent supporter of ousted president Ferdinand Marcos. As a Marcos loyalist, she participated in both the July 1986 siege of the Manila Hotel and the January 1987 takeover of the GMA television station alongside actresses Elizabeth Oropesa and Annie Ferrer. She led a rally of Marcos loyalists at the Plaza Nuestra Señora de Guia in Ermita, Manila on May 1, 1987, and was charged with rebellion by the Northern Police District in the same year for her participation in the January takeover of the GMA Network television station.

== Filmography ==
Year	Title	Role	Note(s)	Ref(s).
1955	Tagapagmana			
1964	Nagbabagang Paraiso			
1964	DJ Dance Time		Television film	
1964	Sa Bawa't Pintig ng Puso			
1965	Kikong Milyonaryo			
1965	Tatlong Big Shot			
1965	Genghis Bond: Agent 1-2-3			
1966	Gintong Patibong			
1966	Lambat			
1966	Mr. Walastik, Laging May Atik			
1966	Sa Dulo ng Ating Landas			
1966	Jala Jala Jerk (...And How You Do It!)			
1966	Chinatown			
1967	Valiente Brothers			
1968	Killer Patrol			
1968	Journey to Hell (The Lucky 9 Commandos)			
1970	Songs and Lovers			
1970	Love Letters			
1971	Nympho			
1971	Desgraciada			
1971	Daluyong!			
1971	Durog			
1972	Alas Na Oros			
1972	Halik ng Vampira			
1972	Nardong Putik			
1973	Black Mama White Mama			
1973	Pepeng Agimat			
1973	Dugo ng Bayan			
1974	Kung Bakit Dugo ang Kulay ng Gabi			
1974	Psssst... Halika Babae			
1974	Kapitan Eddie Set (Mad Killer of Cavite)			
1975	Harabas Is My Name			
1975	Siya'y Umalis, Siya'y Dumating			
1976	Babae... Sa Likod ng Salamin			
1977	Lakaki, Babae Kami			
1977	Bawal: For Men Only			
1978	Sari-saring Ibong Kulasisi			
1978	Babaeng Makasalanan... Lalaking Salawahan			
1978	Isang Gabi sa Iyo... Isang Gabi sa Akin			
1984	Nang Masugatan ang Gabi			
1984	Hawakan Mo at Pigilan ang Kahapon			
1985	Hello Lover, Goodbye Friend			
1986	Magkayakap sa Magdamag			
1988	Alyas Pusa: Ang Taong May 13 Buhay			
1995	Campus Girls			
