= ASAP Pop Viewers' Choice Awards =

Entertainment awards in the Philippines

- Awarded for: Highest fan-based text votes
- Country: Philippines
- Presented by: ASAP

Television/radio coverage
- Network: ABS-CBN

The ASAP Pop Viewers' Choice Awards is an annual award show that airs on the ABS-CBN cable channel, which is held on a Sunday afternoon during ASAP variety show every end of the year, usually in November or December. It honors the year's biggest television, movie, and music domestic acts, as voted by fans of the network.

== Voting process ==
The noontime variety show, ASAP, will first release the official nominees for the year's awards show. Fans who wanted to vote for their selected celebrities will then be asked to vote in three ways. First, they can vote through ASAP's official website. They can also fill out the "POP Balota" included in Star Studio and Chalk magazines, then submit it in the respective ABS-CBN regional offices or National Book Store branches. Lastly, they can vote through their mobile phones by texting.

== Events ==
Events	Year	Voting period	Awards date	Ref.
1st ASAP Pop Viewers' Choice Awards	2006			
3rd ASAP Pop Viewers' Choice Awards	2007			
4th ASAP Pop Viewers' Choice Awards	2008		November 16	
5th ASAP Pop Viewers' Choice Awards	2009			
6th ASAP Pop Viewers' Choice Awards	2010		November 21	
7th ASAP Pop Viewers' Choice Awards	2011	October 2 -		
8th ASAP Pop Viewers' Choice Awards	2012	October 7 -	November 11	
9th ASAP Pop Viewers' Choice Awards	2013	October 20 - November 12	December 8	
10th ASAP Pop Viewer's Choice Awards	2014		November 30	

== Merit categories ==
=== Final ===
==== "Pop Music" category ====
- Pop Female Artist: since 2006
- Pop Male Artist: since 2006
- Pop Song: since 2006
- Pop Album: since 2006

==== "Pop Music Video" category ====
- Pop Music Video: since 2006
- Pop Celebrity Cameo in a Music Video: since 2006 (also known as "Pop Celebrity Appearance in Music Video")
- Pop Band Performance: since 2006

==== "Pop Movie" category ====
- Pop Movie Of the Year: since 2007
- Pop Movie Theme Song: since 2006
- Pop Screen Kiss: since 2006
- Pop Love Team: since 2006

==== "Pop Kapamilya TV Show" category ====
- Pop Kapamilya TV Show: since 2006
- Pop Kapamilya TV Character: since 2006 (also known as "Pop Teleserye Character")
- Pop TV Theme Song: since 2006 (also known as "Pop Teleserye Theme Song" or "Pop Kapamilya TV Theme Song")
- Pop Soundtrack Album: since 2012

==== "Pop Astig" category ====
- Pop Female Fashionista: since 2007
- Pop Male Fashionista: since 2007
- Pop Cover Girl: since 2006
- Pop Cover Boy: since 2006 (also known as "Pop Pin-Up Boy")

==== Other categories ====
- Pop Fans Club: since 2010
- Pop Netizen: since 2012 (also known as "Pop Twittizen" or "Pop Twit")
- Tween Popsies: since 2010

=== Occasional ===
- Pop Kapamilya TV New Face: 2009 only
- Pop K-Pop: 2010 only
- Pop Female Cutie: 2010 only
- Pop Male Cutie: 2010 only
- Pop Sensation: 2011 only
- Pop Breakthrough Star: 2013 only

=== Discontinued categories ===
- Pop Female Performance: 2006-2009
- Pop Male Performance: 2006-2009
- Pop Band: 2006-2010

== Winners list ==
Sarah Geronimo is the most awarded artist in the ASAP Pop Viewers' Choice Awards history.

The following are the list of winners:

Year	2006	2007	2008	2009	2010	2011	2012	2013
Pop Music
Pop Female Artist	Rachelle Ann Go	Rachelle Ann Go	Sarah Geronimo	Sarah Geronimo	Sarah Geronimo	Sarah Geronimo	Sarah Geronimo	Sarah Geronimo
Pop Male Artist	Erik Santos	Christian Bautista	Erik Santos	Jed Madela	Christian Bautista	Christian Bautista	Daniel Padilla	Daniel Padilla
Pop Band^{‡}	Sponge Cola	Callalily	Sponge Cola	6 Cycle Mind	6 Cycle Mind	-	-	-
Pop Song	"I Still Believe In Loving You" (Sarah Geronimo)	"Ngiti" (Ronnie Liang)	"Very Special Love" (Sarah Geronimo)	"You Changed My Life" (Sarah Geronimo)	"My Love Is Here" (Erik Santos)	"Sino Nga Ba Siya" (Sarah Geronimo)	"Bakit Pa Ba" (Sarah Geronimo)	"Nasa Iyo na ang Lahat" (Daniel Padilla)
Pop Album	Becoming; Sarah Geronimo	?	Taking Flight; Sarah Geronimo	?	Music and Me; Sarah Geronimo	One Heart; Sarah Geronimo	Pure OPM Classics; Sarah Geronimo	Expressions; Sarah Geronimo
Pop Music Video
Pop Music Video	"She Could Be"; Christian Bautista	"Time In"; Yeng Constantino	"Himig Ng Pag Ibig"; Yeng Constantino	?	-	"Bakit Mahal Pa Rin Kita"; Erik Santos	"Sino Nga Ba Siya"; Sarah Geronimo	"It Takes a Man and a Woman"; Sarah Geronimo
Pop Female Performance^{‡}	Rachelle Ann Go (for "I Care")	Sarah Geronimo (for "Carry My Love")	Sarah Geronimo (for "Very Special Love")	Sarah Geronimo (for "Dahil Minahal Mo Ko")	-	-	-	-
Pop Male Performance^{‡}	Erik Santos (for "Bakit ba Iniibig Ka?")	Ronnie Liang (for "Gusto Ka")	Erik Santos (for "Here I Am")	Christian Bautista (for "Tell Me Your Name")	-	-	-	-
Pop Band Performance^{‡}	Cueshé	MYMP (for "Only Reminds Me Of You"")	Sponge Cola (for "Pasubali")	Sponge Cola (for "Di Na Mababawi")	-	-	-	-
Pop Celebrity Cameo	Piolo Pascual ("We Belong")	Kim Chiu and Gerald Anderson ("Love Team")	Riza Santos ("Eternally")	Billy Crawford ("If You’re Not the One")	Angel Locsin ("Magkabilang Mundo")	Angel Locsin ("Beautiful Girl")	Slater Young ("Bakit Ba Minamahal Kita?")	Kim Chiu ("Discolamon")
Pop Movie
Pop Movie		You Got Me!	A Very Special Love	You Changed My Life	Miss You Like Crazy	Catch Me, I'm in Love	The Unkabogable Praybeyt Benjamin	It Takes a Man and a Woman
Pop Movie Theme Song	"You Are the One" (You Are the One)	"Hawak Kamay" (Kasal, Kasali, Kasalo)	"A Very Special Love" (A Very Special Love)	"You Changed My Life" (You Changed My Life)	"Miss You Like Crazy" (Miss You Like Crazy)	"Fallin" (Catch Me, I'm in Love)	"Won't Last A Day Without You" (Won't Last a Day Without You)	"It Takes a Man and a Woman" (It Takes a Man and a Woman)
Pop Screen Kiss	Toni Gonzaga and Sam Milby (You Are the One)	Toni Gonzaga and Sam Milby (You Got Me!)	Bea Alonzo and John Lloyd Cruz (One More Chance)	Sarah Geronimo and John Lloyd Cruz (You Changed My Life)	Gerald Anderson and Kim Chiu (Paano Na Kaya)	Gerald Anderson and Kim Chiu (Till My Heartaches End)	*	Sarah Geronimo and John Lloyd Cruz (It Takes a Man and a Woman)
Pop Love Team	Kim Chiu and Gerald Anderson (First Day High)	Angel Locsin and Richard Gutierrez (The Promise)	Bea Alonzo and John Lloyd Cruz (One More Chance)	Sarah Geronimo and John Lloyd Cruz (You Changed My Life)	Anne Curtis and Sam Milby (Babe, I Love You)	Kim Chiu and Gerald Anderson (Till My Heartaches End)	*	Kim Chiu and Xian Lim (Bakit Hindi Ka Crush Ng Crush Mo?)
Pop Kapamilya TV Show
Pop Kapamilya TV Show	Bituing Walang Ningning	Sana Maulit Muli	My Girl	Tayong Dalawa	Kung Tayo'y Magkakalayo	100 Days to Heaven	Princess and I	Got to Believe
Pop TV Character	Dorina (Sarah Geronimo); Bituing Walang Ningning	Poknat & Bokbok (Kim Chiu and Gerald Anderson); Sana Maulit Muli	Jasmine & Julian (Kim Chiu and Gerald Anderson); My Girl	Santino (Zaijan Jaranilla); May Bukas Pa	Gwen and Robi (Kim Chiu and Gerald Anderson); Kung Tayo'y Magkakalayo	Jade/Yuan (Kim Chiu); My Binondo Girl	Budoy (Gerald Anderson); Budoy	Chichay and Joaquin (Kathryn Bernardo and Daniel Padilla); Got to Believe
Pop TV Theme Song	"Bituing Walang Ningning"; Bituing Walang Ningning	"Pag-ibig na Kaya?"; Princess Hours	"Pangarap na Bituin"; Pangarap na Bituin	"Tayong Dalawa"; Tayong Dalawa	"You'll Always Be My Number One"; 1DOL	"Kunin Mo Na Ang Lahat Sa Akin"; Minsan Lang Kita Iibigin	"Di Lang Ikaw"; Precious Hearts Romances Presents: Hiyas	"Got to Believe"; Got to Believe
Pop Soundtrack Album							Princess and I album	Ina, Kapatid, Anak album
Pop Astig
Pop Female Fashionista	Anne Curtis^{1}	Anne Curtis	Angel Locsin	Anne Curtis	Kim Chiu	Kim Chiu	Dawn Zulueta	Kim Chiu
Pop Male Fashionista	none^{1}	?	Zanjoe Marudo	Enchong Dee	John Lloyd Cruz	John Lloyd Cruz	Daniel Padilla	Vice Ganda
Pop Cover Girl	Angelica Panganiban (Maxim)	?	Angel Locsin	Kim Chiu	Angel Locsin	Sarah Geronimo (Meg)	Sarah Geronimo	Sarah Geronimo
Pop Pin-Up Boy	Enchong Dee	?	Jon Avila	Gerald Anderson	Sam Milby	Enchong Dee	Xian Lim	Daniel Padilla
Others
Pop Fans Club					"Melason" (Melisa Cantiveros and Jason Francisco)	"Kimerald" (Kim Chiu and Gerald Anderson)	"Kathniel" (Kathryn Bernardo and Daniel Padilla)	"KimXi" (Kim Chiu and Xian Lim)
Pop Netizen						Sarah Geronimo	Anne Curtis	Vice Ganda
Tween Popsies					"JamLi" (James Reid and Ann Li)	"JaeVon" (James Reid and Devon Seron)	"RyRen" (Ryan Boyce and Karen Reyes)	-

^{1} only the "Pop Fashionista" award was given in 2006.
^{—} categories that are not awarded in that year.
^{*} only nominees are announced; no winners.
^{‡} discontinued categories.

=== Single recipients ===
- Pop Kapamilya TV New Face: Zaijan Jaranilla
- Pop K-Pop: Super Junior
- Pop Female Cutie: Nadine Lustre
- Pop Male Cutie: Daniel Padilla
- Pop Sensation: Shamcey Supsup
- Pop Breakthrough Star: Janella Salvador

== See also ==
- List of Asian television awards
