= Till My Heartaches End =

- Theatrical film poster
- Directed by: Jose Javier Reyes
- Written by: Jose Javier Reyes
- Produced by: Charo Santos-Concio; Malou Santos
- Starring: Kim Chiu; Gerald Anderson
- Cinematography: Rodolfo Aves Jr.
- Edited by: Vito Cajili
- Music by: Jesse Lucas
- Production company: Star Cinema
- Distributed by: Star Cinema
- Release date: October 27, 2010
- Running time: 110 minutes
- Country: Philippines
- Language: Filipino
- Box office: ₱53,000,000.00 (10 weeks)

Till My Heartaches End is a 2010 Filipino romantic drama film directed by Jose Javier Reyes and starring Kim Chiu and Gerald Anderson. The film reunited Chiu and Anderson following the conclusion of their television series Kung Tayo'y Magkakalayo on July 9, 2010. It marked their first film together since Paano Na Kaya, which was released earlier that year on January 27. It is produced and released by Star Cinema.

== Plot ==
Paolo "Powie" Barredo (Gerald Anderson) is out to prove to the world that he can succeed in life independently, and is not just a son born out of wedlock. Despite a rough upbringing, he climbs the ladder of success. As things start falling into place and he is thrilled to achieve his goal, he puts other life matters on hold.

Agnes Garcia (Kim Chiu) always longed for the time when her family would finally be completed again. At the age of 6, her parents left the country to work abroad – her mother was a medical technician in the United States, while her father worked as an engineer in Riyadh. Despite the distance, Agnes treasured the hope that she would reunite with her parents once again when she passed the nursing exam and applied to work in the States.

They find each other at a café and couldn't take their eyes off each other. They found solace and comfort in each other's company. But their life paths moved them in opposite directions.

== Cast ==
=== Main ===
- Kim Chiu as Agnes Garcia
- Gerald Anderson as Paolo "Powie" Barredo

=== Supporting ===
- Matet de Leon as Gemma
- Guji Lorenzana as John
- Desiree Del Valle as Lea
- Niña Dolino as Maricar
- Martin del Rosario as Wally
- Manuel Chua as Carlo
- Cacai Bautista as Susan
- Enrique Gil as Jaco
- Jaco Benin as Arnel
- Eda Nolan as Jane
- Mark Gil as Paquito Barredo
- Boots Anson-Roa as Tita Baby
- Tibo Jumalon as Edwin
- Dianne Medina as Lizette
- Angel Jacob as Mia
- Gemmae Custodio as Bakekang

=== Guest cast ===
- Igi Boy Flores as young Paolo Powie Barredo
- Miles Ocampo as young Agnes Garcia
- Richard Yap as Friend of Paolo Powie Barredo
- Jacob Ewaniuk as Friend of Paolo Powie Barredo

== Soundtrack ==
The official soundtrack, 'Till My Heartaches End, is covered by Carol Banawa, which was originally sung by Ella Mae Saison.
