= List of awards and nominations received by Darren Espanto =

Darren Espanto awards and nominations
Awards and nominations
Award	Wins	Nominations
Aliw Awards	0	2
ASAP Viewers' Choice Awards	2	4
Awit Awards	8	15
Box Office Entertainment Awards	3	3
EdukCircle Awards	7	8
Myx Music Awards	8	18
MOR Music Awards	2	7
PMPC Star Awards for Music	4	18
Push Awards	8	10
RAWR Awards	5	7
Star Cinema Awards	4	9
Village Pipol Choice Awards	1	6
Wish Music Awards	15	15
Other awards	10	12

Totals (Note: Certain award groups do not simply award one winner. They acknowledge several different recipients, have runners-up, and have third place. Since this is a specific recognition and is different from losing an award, runner-up mentions are considered wins in this award tally. For simplification and to avoid errors, each award in this list has been presumed to have had a prior nomination.)
- Wins: 77
- Nominations: 134

This is a list of awards and nominations received by Filipino-Canadian singer and actor Darren Lyndon Gonzales Espanto, best known by his stage name Darren Espanto.

== Major associations ==
=== Aliw Awards ===
Aliw Awards by the Aliw Awards Foundation, Inc. was established by the renowned Philippine journalist Alice H. Reyes, to recognize achievements in the live entertainment industry in the Philippines.

Year	Award	Nominated work	Result	Ref
2015	Best New Male Artist	Darren Espanto	Nominated	
2016	Best Major Concert	Darren Espanto: D' Birthday Concert	Nominated	

=== Awit Awards ===
The Awit Awards are music awards in the Philippines given annually by the Philippine Association of the Record Industry (PARI) to recognize the outstanding achievements in the music industry. The word "Awit" means "song" literally in Tagalog.

Year	Award	Nominated work	Result	Ref
2015	Best Album Package	Darren: The Album	Won	
2015	Best Christmas Recording	Lord Merry Christmas by Bassilyo feat. The Voice Kids' Top 6	Nominated	
2015	Best Christmas Recording	Thank You, Ang Babait Ninyo by The Voice Kids Top 4	Nominated	
2015	Best Performance by a New Male Recording Artist	In Love Ako Sa'Yo	Won	
2016	Best Album Package	Darren Espanto: The Early Years	Nominated	
2016	Best Performance by a Male Recording Artist	I Believe	Nominated	
2017	Best Selling Album of the Year	Be With Me	Won	
2017	People Choice Awards: Album of the Year	Be With Me	Won	
2017	People Choice Awards: Best Performance by a Male Recording Artist	Alam	Won	
2017	People Choice Awards: Best Collaboration	"I'll Be There" (with Jed Madela)	Won	
2017	People Choice Awards: Song of the Year	"Alam"	Won	
2017	People Choice Awards: Record of the Year	"Alam"	Won	
2020	Best Engineered Recording	Sasagipin Kita	Nominated	
2020	Best Performance by a Male Recording Artist	Sasagipin Kita	Nominated	
2020	Best Pop Recording	Sasagipin Kita	Nominated	

=== Box Office Entertainment Awards ===
The Box Office Entertainment Awards, sometimes known as the GMMSF Box Office Entertainment Awards is an annual award ceremony held in Metro Manila and organized by Guillermo Mendoza Memorial Scholarship Foundation.

Year	Award	Nominated work	Result	Ref
2015	Promising Male Singer/Performer	Darren Espanto	Won	
2016	Promising Male Concert Performer	Darren Espanto	Won	
2018	Promising Male Concert Performer	Darren Espanto	Won	

=== Myx Music Awards ===
The Myx Music Awards, currently known as the Myx Awards, are accolades presented by the cable channel Myx to honor the biggest hitmakers in the Philippines.

Year	Award	Nominated work	Result	Ref
2015	Favorite New Artist	Darren Espanto	Won	
2015	Favorite Remake	Somebody To Love	Nominated	
2016	Favorite Artist	Darren Espanto	Nominated	
2016	Favorite Male Artist	Darren Espanto	Won	
2016	Favorite MYX Celebrity VJ	Darren Espanto	Won	
2016	Favorite Music Video	Makin' Moves	Nominated	
2016	Favorite Song	Stuck	Nominated	
2017	Favorite Artist	Darren Espanto	Won	
2017	Favorite Male Artist	Darren Espanto	Won	
2017	Favorite Music Video	7 Minutes	Nominated	
2017	Favorite Song	7 Minutes	Nominated	
2018	Favorite Artist	Darren Espanto	Nominated	
2018	Favorite Male Artist	Darren Espanto	Nominated	
2018	Favorite Collaboration	"I'll Be There" (with Jed Madela)	Nominated	
2018	Favorite Remake	"I'll Be There" (with Jed Madela)	Won	
2019	Artist of the Year	Darren Espanto	Nominated	
2019	Male Artist of the Year	Darren Espanto	Won	
2019	Remake of the Year	"Dying Inside to Hold You"	Won	

=== MOR Music Awards ===
Year	Award	Nominated work	Result	Ref
2016	Album of the Year	DARREN: The Album	Won	
2016	Best New Artist of the Year	Darren Espanto	Nominated	
2016	Best Revival of the Year	In Love Ako Sa'Yo	Nominated	
2016	Male Artist of the Year	Darren Espanto	Nominated	
2017	Album of the Year	Be With Me	Won	
2019	Best Collaboration	"Nanay, Tatay" with Gloc-9, Anne Curtis	Nominated	
2019	Male Artist of the Year	Poison	Nominated	

=== PMPC Star Awards for Music ===
The PMPC Star Awards for Music honors Filipino music artists who have major contributions in promoting the Original Pilipino Music (OPM) industry for the past year.

Year	Award	Nominated work	Result	Ref
2015	Album Cover and Concept of the Year	Darren: The Album	Won	
2015	Album of the Year	Darren: The Album	Nominated	
2015	New Male Recording Artist of the Year	Darren Espanto	Nominated	
2015	Pop Album of the Year	Darren: The Album	Won	
2016	Album of the Year	Be With Me	Nominated	
2016	Concert of the Year	D' Birthday Concert	Nominated	
2016	Cover Design of the Year	Be With Me	Won	
2016	Dance Album of the Year	Be With Me	Nominated	
2016	Male Concert Performer of the Year	Darren Espanto	Nominated	
2016	Male Pop Artist of the Year	Darren Espanto	Won	
2016	Male Recording Artist of the Year	Darren Espanto	Nominated	
2016	Pop Album of the Year	Be With Me	Nominated	
2016	Song of the Year	Home	Nominated	
2019	Dance Recording of the Year	Poison	Nominated	
2019	Male Concert Performer of the Year	Darren Espanto	Nominated	
2019	Male Pop Artist of the Year	Darren Espanto	Nominated	
2022	Male Pop Artist of the Year	Darren Espanto	Nominated	
2022	Collaboration of the Year	Sana Tayo Na	Nominated	

=== Wish Music Awards ===
The Wish 107.5 Music Awards (abbreviated as WMA) is an accolade presented by the FM radio station Wish 107.5, which aims to pay tribute to acts and artists who have given significant contributions in the music scene in the Philippines.

Year	Award	Nominated work	Result	Ref
2016	Best Wish Cover	In Love Ako Sa'Yo	Won	
2016	Most Wishful Fandom	Darrenatics	Won	
2016	Wish Ballad Song of the Year	I Believe in Me	Won	
2016	Wish Original Song of the Year	Stuck	Won	
2016	Wish Performance by a Young Artist	Chandelier by Sia (Cover)	Won	
2016	Wish Song of the Year	I Believe in Me	Won	
2016	Wish Viral Video of the Year	Chandelier by Sia (Cover)	Won	
2017	Wish Elite Circle (Bronze)	Chandelier by Sia (Cover)	Won	
2017	Wish Original Song of the Year by a Male Artist	7 Minutes	Won	
2017	Wish Performance by a Young Artist	I Believe	Won	
2017	Wish Young Artist of the Year	Darren Espanto	Won	
2020	Wishclusive Collaboration of the Year	"A Whole New World" (with Morissette)	Won	
2020	Wish Elite Circle (Bronze)	"A Whole New World" (with Morissette)	Won	
2021	Wishclusive Ballad Performance of the Year	Sasagipin Kita	Won	
2021	Wish Elite Circle (Silver)	"A Whole New World" (with Morissette)	Won	

=== Other Major Awards ===
Award ceremony	Year	Category	Result	Ref.
Comguild Academe's Choice Awards	2019	Male Artist of the Year	Won	
EdukCircle Awards	2015	Most Influential Concert Performer of The Year	Won	
EdukCircle Awards	2016	Most Influential Concert Performer of the Year	Won	
EdukCircle Awards	2016	Most Influential Male Music Artist of the Year	Nominated	
EdukCircle Awards	2017	Most Outstanding Teen Artist of the Year	Won	
EdukCircle Awards	2018	Most Outstanding Teen Artist of the Year	Won	
EdukCircle Awards	2019	Male Music Artist of the Year	Won	
EdukCircle Awards	2019	Most Influential Concert Performer of the Year	Won	
EdukCircle Awards	2019	Most Outstanding Teen Artist of the Year	Won	
Gawad Musika Awards	2019	Outstanding Worldclass Male Performing Artist	Won	
Golden Laurel LPU Batangas Media Awards	2017	Best Male Singer	Won	
Golden Laurel LPU Batangas Media Awards	2018	Best Male Recording Artist of the Year	Won	
Laguna Excellence Awards	2020	Outstanding Male Pop Artist of the Year	Won	

== Minor associations ==
Award ceremony	Year	Category	Result	Ref.
Alta Media Icon Awards	2016	Song of the Year – Stuck	Won	
ASAP Pop Viewers' Choice Awards	2014	Pop Male Cutie	Won	
ASAP Pop Viewers' Choice Awards	2015	Pop Teen Heartthrob	Nominated	
ASAP Pop Viewers' Choice Awards	2015	Pop Teen Fans Club	Nominated	
ASAP Pop Viewers' Choice Awards	2016	Pop Heartthrob	Won	
Hello Asia AU	2015	Asian Artist of the Year	Nominated	
Hello Asia AU	2016	Asian Artist of the Year	Nominated	
Inside Showbiz Awards	2019	Favorite Male Performer	Won	
Inside Showbiz Awards	2020	Best Young Artist	Won	
PEP List	2015	Male Teen Star of the Year	Won	
PEP List	2016	Male Teen Star of the Year	Won	
Push Awards	2015	Awesome OOTD King	Nominated	
Push Awards	2015	Awesome Song Cover Performance	Won	
Push Awards	2015	PushGram Most Loved Newcomer	Won	
Push Awards	2015	PushLike Most Liked Newcomer	Won	
Push Awards	2015	PushPlay Best Group or Tandem	Nominated	
Push Awards	2015	PushTweet Favorite Newcomer	Won	
Push Awards	2016	Popular Song Cover – I Believe	Won	
Push Awards	2016	Push Elite Music Artist Celebrity of the Year	Won	
Push Awards	2016	PushLike Male Celebrity	Won	
Push Awards	2016	PushLike Music Artist	Won	
Push Awards	2016	PushPlay Music Artist	Won	
Push Awards	2020	Push Cover of the Year – A Whole New World (with Morissette	Won	
RAWR Awards	2015	Male Performer of the Year	Won	
RAWR Awards	2015	Viral Video of the Year – Chandelier (Cover)	Won	
RAWR Awards	2016	Fan Club of the Year – Darrenatics	Won	
RAWR Awards	2016	Favorite Song of the Year – 7 Minutes	Won	
RAWR Awards	2018	Supporting Actor of the Year	Won	
RAWR Awards	2020	Fan Club of the Year – Darrenatics	Nominated	
RAWR Awards	2020	Favorite Performer	Nominated	
Star Cinema Awards	2014	Best Fandom – Darrenatics	Won	
Star Cinema Awards	2014	Most Promising Child Star	Won	
Star Cinema Awards	2014	Newsmaker of the Year	Won	
Star Cinema Awards	2015	Favorite Fandom – Darrenatics	Nominated	
Star Cinema Awards	2015	Favorite Social Media Celebrity	Nominated	
Star Cinema Awards	2015	Favorite Trending Sensation	Won	
Star Cinema Awards	2016	Favorite Male Recording Artist	Nominated	
Star Cinema Awards	2016	Favorite Social Media Personality	Nominated	
Star Cinema Awards	2016	Favorite Trending Sensation	Nominated	
Village Pipol Choice Awards	2020	Fandom of the Year – Darrenatics	Nominated	
Village Pipol Choice Awards	2020	Performer of the Year	Won	
Village Pipol Choice Awards	2020	VP Cover of the Year	Nominated	
Village Pipol Choice Awards	2021	Fandom of the Year – Darrenatics	Nominated	
Village Pipol Choice Awards	2021	Performer of the Year	Nominated	
Village Pipol Choice Awards	2021	VP Cover of the Year	Nominated	
