= Francis Magundayao =

Filipino actor

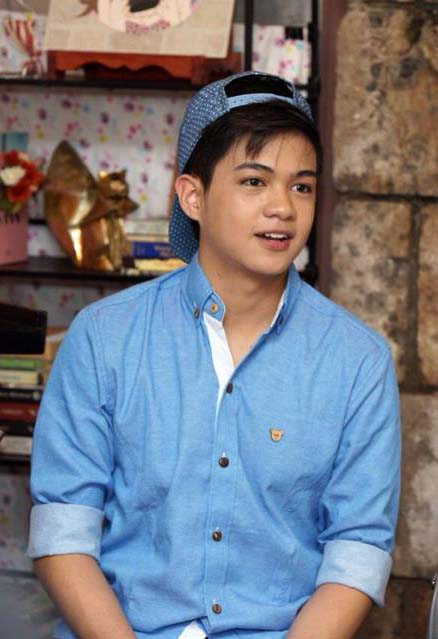
- Magundayao in September 2014
- Born: Francis Elmer Cabalteja Magundayao; May 14, 1999 (age 27); Antipolo, Rizal, Philippines
- Other names: Iking, Kiko
- Occupations: Actor, commercial model
- Years active: 2005–present
- Agents: GMA Artist Center (2005–2012); Star Magic (2012–2021) Viva Artists Agency (2021–present)
- Height: 5 ft 5.5 in (166 cm)

Francis Elmer Cabalteja Magundayao (born May 14, 1999) is a Filipino actor and commercial model. He was first known as Iking in the series, Darna. He is also known for portraying young Travis (adult version portrayed by Gerald Anderson) in Sana Maulit Muli, Paco in the May Bukas Pa, Adrian in Aryana. He graduated high school from Far Eastern University-Diliman last June 7, 2019 with his mother, Frances Magundayao attending the commencement ceremony at the Philippine International Convention Center in Pasay.

== Career ==
Francis Elmer Cabalteja Magundayao, cousin of Abelardo Pagulayan (Mr. Pogi 2018) started his career as a commercial model at a very young age. He appears in several commercial before joining the cast of Darna as the heroine's sidekick, from then on he was referred to as Iking. Francis is also oftentimes portray the younger version of Gerald Anderson's character in television series like Sana Maulit Muli, Tayong Dalawa and Tiagong Akyat. He has since landed short supporting roles in various GMA Network and ABS-CBN shows, but it was his role as the teen version of Piolo Pascual's character in the drama Dahil sa Pag-ibig that made people notice him.

After his short stint as teen Alfred in Dahil sa Pag-ibig, he topbilled his first ever Maalaala Mo Kaya episode with John Manalo about the friendship of two boys whose dreams turned into tragic experienced. The said MMK episode was the most-watched program last March 31, 2012.

=== 2012–2021: Star Magic ===
Magundayao signed an exclusive contract with Star Magic and got reunited with Ella Cruz when he became a part of Aryana. Francis was supposed to be in a film with Kathryn Bernardo and Daniel Padilla, but later give up his role to perform with his family in noontime variety show It's Showtime.

In August 2019, Magundayao was once again reunited with his Aryana co-star and loveteam Ella Cruz together with Bugoy Cariño as they topbill Wansapanataym's Oh My Genius. In October 2013, Francis was supposed to be reunited with Ella for the fifth time in the upcoming family drama You're My Home, with Richard Gomez and Dawn Zulueta, but the plans fell through and the drama was put on hold by Dreamscape to give way for the productions' other dramas.

In January 2014, at the ABS-CBN Trade Launch, it was revealed that Francis and his Aryana co-star Michelle Vito are part of the ensemble cast of Sana Bukas pa ang Kahapon, which starred Bea Alonzo, Paulo Avelino and Albert Martinez. In March, he again topbills another Wansapanataym special with Sharlene San Pedro and Jairus Aquino which entitled Si Lulu at Lily Liit.

In 2015, he starred in his big screen debut opposite to Barbie Forteza and Elisse Joson entitled #EwanKoSaU Saranghaeyo, a maindie (mainstream independent) romcom film.

== Filmography ==
=== Television ===
Year	Title	Role
2005	Mars Ravelo's Darna	Iking
2007	Sana Maulit Muli	Preteen Travis
2007	Asian Treasures	Pogi
2007	Mga Mata ni Anghelita	Niknok
2007	Kokey	Elias
2007	Carlo J. Caparas' Kamandag	Boyong
2007	Mga Kuwento Ni Lola Basyang: Ang Parusa Ng Duwende	Tias
2008	Carlo J. Caparas' Gagambino	Young Bino
2009	Tayong Dalawa	Young JR
2009	Komiks Presents: Nasaan Ka Maruja?	Myrno "Boy" Alicante
2009	Only You	Young Jonathan
2009	Sine Novela: Kung Aagawin Mo Ang Lahat Sa Akin	Young Arvin
2009	Agimat: Ang Mga Alamat ni Ramon Revilla: Tiagong Akyat	Young Santiago "Tiago" Ronquillo
2009	SRO Cinema Serye: Exchange Gift	EJ/Miguel
2009–2010	May Bukas Pa	Paco
2010	The Last Prince	Onuro
2010	Noah	Teen Gabriel
2010	Kokey @ Ako	Belat/Alien
2010	Mara Clara	Young Gary David
2011	Pidol's Wonderland	Jervin Tesorio
2011	Futbolilits	Diego Roxas
2011	Amaya	Teen Angaway
2011	Wansapanataym: My Gulay	Ritchie
2011	Wansapanataym: Happy Neo Year	Jomel
2012	Wansapanataym: Somewhere Over The Bahaghari	Emong
2012	Felina: Prinsesa ng mga Pusa	Teen Joaquin
2012	Dahil sa Pag-ibig	Teen Alfred Valderama
2012	Maalaala Mo Kaya: Barko	Meynard Alcala
2012–2013	Aryana	Adrian "Ian" Alejandro
2013	Maynila: My Tropa, My Tru-Lab	Jolo
2013	Maalaala Mo Kaya: Football	Paterno
2013	Wansapanataym: OMG (Oh My Genius)	Benson
2013	Maalaala Mo Kaya: Tirintas	Oliver
2014	Wansapanataym: Si Lulu At Si Lily Liit	Adrian
2014	Sana Bukas pa ang Kahapon	Sebastian Syquia
2014	Maalaala Mo Kaya: Stars	Del
2014	Luv U	Andrew Ford Pineda
2014	Maalaala Mo Kaya: Nurse Cap	Andrew Palma
2014	Ipaglaban Mo: Kahit Bata Pa Ako	Boyet
2015	Maalaala Mo Kaya: Class Card	Francis
2015	Ipaglaban Mo: Ang Bintang Mo Sa Akin	Chris Espiritu
2015	Maalaala Mo Kaya: Barko	Michael Capulong
2015	And I Love You So	Joseph "Otep" Reyes
2015	Maalaala Mo Kaya: Parol King	Angel
2016	Ipaglaban Mo: Dahas	Onat
2016	Parang Normal Activity	Blue
2016	My Super D	Teenage Dodong
2016	Born for You	Allan
2016	Ipaglaban Mo: Kabataan	Joel
2016	Ipaglaban Mo: Pagpag	Otep
2017	La Luna Sangre	Nognog Sebastian
2017	Wansapanataym: Jasmin's Flower Powers	Santi
2018	FPJ's Ang Probinsyano	Yohan Hidalgo
2018	Since I Found You	Young Nathan Capistrano
2018	Ipaglaban Mo: Bastardo	Mario Gregorio
2019	Ipaglaban Mo: Reputasyon	Ivo
2020	A Soldier's Heart	Amir Majul
2021	Maalaala Mo Kaya: Bible	Dodong
2023	Roadkillers	Jairus
2023	The Rain In España	Miguel Villaflor
2025	It’s Okay to Not Be Okay	Jason
2025	Para sa Isa't Isa	Japoy "Poy" Lozada
2026	Our Yesterday's Escape	Miguel Villaflor

=== Film ===
Year	Title	Role	Note
2015	#Ewankosau Saranghaeyo	Sebastian "Baste" Agoncillo	Indie Film
2016	The Story of Love	Pedro	Indie Film
2017	Instalado	Danny S. Quiazon	Indie Film
2018	Signal Rock	Bong	
2019	Man and Wife	Peping	

== Awards and nominations ==
Year	Award	Category	Work	Result	Source
2016	32nd PMPC Star Awards for Movies	New Movie Actor of the Year	#Ewankosau Saranghaeyo	Nominated	
2017	2nd ToFarm Film Festival	Best Supporting Actor	Instalado	Won	
