= Paolo Serrano =

Filipino film actor (born 1987)

- Born: Paolo Matthew Serrano; August 17, 1987 (age 38); Makati, Philippines
- Other name: Pao
- Occupations: Actor, Model
- Years active: 2005–present
- Agents: GMA Artist Center (2005–2009); Star Magic (since 2009)

Paolo Matthew Serrano (born August 17, 1987), more widely known as Paolo Serrano is a television and film actor in the Philippines. His film debut was in the indie film Matthew, Mark, Luke and John but mainly gained his fame when he got a role in Green Paradise released in 2007 and into Joel Lamangan's film Heavenly Touch which limited released in 2009.

== Life and career ==
His career in entertainment started in 2005 He first starred in an indie film Matthew, Mark, Luke and John until GMA Network discovered his potential in acting. He debuted in television when he became one of the members of the cast of Daisy Siete: Isala Chikita which aired on GMA-7. He got a cameo role in Tope Lee's Quija a horror movie produced by GMA Films and released in 2007, he was also cast as David in Green Paradise co-star with Cristine Reyes. In 2008, Serrano had as a recurring role of Babangon Ako't Dudurugin Kita, a remake of a Sharon Cuneta movie, which aired on GMA Network. He starred in Joel Lamangan's film Heavenly Touch with Joash Balejado, and Marco Morales in a lead role. He also joined the cast of Una Kang Naging Akin which is also a remake flicks series. In 2009 Serrano appeared as a guest star in ABS-CBN television drama Tayong Dalawa in three episodes.

On December 23, 2009, Serrano signed with ABS-CBN to star as a major recurring character in suspense drama Kung Tayo'y Magkakalayo which premiered on January 18, 2010. The show ran until July 9, 2010, consisting in 121 episodes.

Serrano recently seen in Television remake of Mara Clara portraying as Fidel Montalban aired on ABS-CBN.

In 2011 Serrano was supposed to pick up by GMA-7's new epic series Amaya but he turned down the project offer due to his ongoing commitment on ABS-CBN. He is now one of the supporting actor in the fantasy series Mutya created by Pablo S. Gomez.

== Filmography ==
=== Film ===
Year	Title	Role
2005	Matthew, Mark, Luke and John	Dork
2006	The Mourning Girls	Richard
2007	Ouija	Cameo
2008	Green Paradise	David
2008	M2M 3: Versus	Jock guy
2009	Heavenly Touch	Rodel
2013	The Fighting Chefs	Cameo
2013	Boy Golden: The Arturo Porcuna Story	Totoy Balantik

=== Television ===
Year	Title	Role
2005	Etheria: Ang Ikalimang Kaharian ng Encantadia	Kawal Sapirian
2007	Daisy Siete: Isla Chikita	George
2008	Babangon Ako't Dudurugin Kita	Jake Sanchez
2008	Una Kang Naging Akin	Jule
2009	Tayong Dalawa	Jonathan
2010	Kung Tayo'y Magkakalayo	Angelo Serrano
2010	Maalaala Mo Kaya: Titulo	Jun
2010	Mara Clara	Fidel Montalban
2011	Pablo S. Gomez's Mutya	Walter Cortez
2011	Growing Up	Marco
2012	Reputasyon	Julius
2012	E-Boy	Rocky
2012	Maalaala Mo Kaya: Kabibe	Gener
2013	Kailangan Ko'y Ikaw	Mark
2013	Little Champ	Badong
2013	My Little Juan	Jordan
2013	Prinsesa ng Buhay Ko	
2013	Got to Believe	Armand Pantay
2014	Ipaglaban Mo: Paano Na Ang Pangarap?	
2015	Nathaniel	Norman
2015	All of Me	Marvin
2016	FPJ's Ang Probinsyano	SPO2 Soliman
2018	The Blood Sisters	Condrad
2019	Nang Ngumiti ang Langit	Victor
2021–2022	Las Hermanas	Gerald Kao
2023–2024	FPJ's Batang Quiapo	Paquito
2025–2026	What Lies Beneath	Warden William Ayoc
2025–2026	Roja	Fredo
