= Ina, Kapatid, Anak =

Ina, Kapatid, Anak may refer to:

- Ina, Kapatid, Anak, a 1979 film directed by Lino Brocka
- Ina, Kapatid, Anak (TV series), a Philippine drama series
- Ina, Kapatid, Anak (soundtrack), a soundtrack for the Philippine series of the same name
