= List of awards and nominations received by Ylona Garcia =

Ylona Garcia awards and nominations
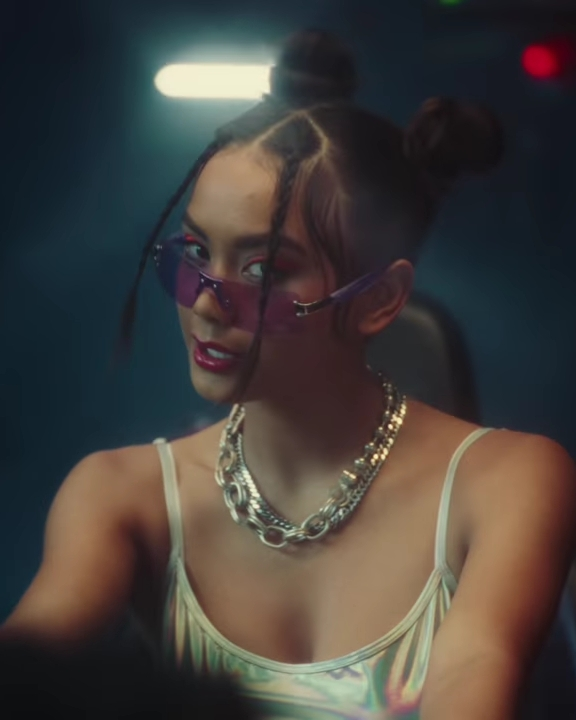
- Garcia in 2020
Awards and nominations
Award	Wins	Nominations
ASAP Choice Awards	0	3
Awit Awards	2	5
GMMSF Awards	1	1
Himig Handog P-Pop Love Songs	4	4
LionHearTV RAWR Awards	1	1
MOR Choice Awards	2	3
Myx Music Awards	1	6
PMPC Awards for Television	0	1
PMPC Awards for Music	1	3
PUSH Awards	2	5
Star Cinema Awards	1	3
WISH Music Awards	1	6

Totals (Note: Certain award groups do not simply award one winner. They acknowledge several different recipients, have runners-up, and have third place. Since this is a specific recognition and is different from losing an award, runner-up mentions are considered wins in this award tally. For simplification and to avoid errors, each award in this list has been presumed to have had a prior nomination.)
- Wins: 16
- Nominations: 41

This is a list of awards and nominations received by Filipino–Australian singer, actress and television personality Ylona Jade Navalle Garcia, best known by her stage name Ylona Garcia.

== Major Associations ==
=== Aliw Awards ===
Aliw Awards by the Aliw Awards Foundation, Inc. was established by the renowned Philippine journalist Alice H. Reyes, to recognize achievements in the live entertainment industry in the Philippines.

Year	Award	Nominated work	Result	Ref
2016	Best New Female Artist	Ylona Garcia	Nominated	

=== Awit Awards ===
The Awit Awards are music awards in the Philippines given annually by the Philippine Association of the Record Industry (PARI) to recognize the outstanding achievements in the music industry. The word "Awit" means "song" literally in Tagalog.

Year	Award	Nominated work	Result	Ref
2017	Best Performance by a New Female Artist	"Win The Fight"	Won	
2017	Best Pop Recording	"O Pag-Ibig" (with Bailey May)	Won	
2017	Best Engineered Recording	"O Pag-Ibig" (with Bailey May)	Nominated	
2017	Song of the Year	"O Pag-Ibig" (with Bailey May)	Nominated	
2017	Best R&B Recording	"Not Yo Bae"	Nominated	

=== Box Office Entertainment Awards ===
The Box Office Entertainment Awards, sometimes known as the GMMSF Box Office Entertainment Awards is an annual award ceremony held in Metro Manila and organized by Guillermo Mendoza Memorial Scholarship Foundation.

Year	Award	Nominated work	Result	Ref
2017	Most Promising Female Singer/Performer of the Year	"My Name Is Ylona Garcia"	Won	

=== MOR Choice Awards ===
Year	Award	Nominated work	Result	Ref
2017	Best Collaboration	"O Pag-Ibig" (with Bailey May)	Nominated	
2017	Female Artist of the Year	"Dahan Dahan Dahan Lang"	Won	
2017	LSS Hit of the Year	"O Pag-Ibig" (with Bailey May)	Won	

=== MYX Music Awards ===
The Myx Music Awards, currently known as the Myx Awards, are accolades presented by the cable channel Myx to honor the biggest hitmakers in the Philippines.

Year	Award	Nominated work	Result	Ref
2017	Favorite New Artist	"My Name Is Ylona Garcia"	Won	
2017	Favorite Music Video	"O Pag-Ibig" (with Bailey May)	Nominated	
2017	Favorite Song	"O Pag-Ibig" (with Bailey May)	Nominated	
2017	Favorite MYX Celeb VJ	"Herself" (with Bailey May)	Nominated	
2018	Mellow Video of the Year	"Fly Tonight"	Nominated	
2020	MYX Celebrity VJ of the Year	"Herself"	Nominated	

=== PMPC Star Awards for Music ===
The PMPC Star Awards for Music honors Filipino music artists who have major contributions in promoting the Original Pilipino Music (OPM) industry for the past year.

Year	Award	Nominated work	Result	Ref
2017	New Female Recording Artist of the Year	"My Name Is Ylona Garcia"	Won	
2017	Female Artist of the Year	"My Name Is Ylona Garcia"	Nominated	
2017	Pop Album of the Year	"My Name Is Ylona Garcia"	Nominated	

=== PMPC Star Awards for Television ===
PMPC Star Awards for Television is an annual award-giving body recognizing the outstanding programming produced by the several TV networks in the Philippines every year.

Year	Award	Nominated work	Result	Ref
2016	Best New Female TV Personality	"On the Wings of Love"	Nominated	

=== Wish Music Awards ===
The Wish 107.5 Music Awards (abbreviated as WMA) is an accolade presented by the FM radio station Wish 107.5, which aims to pay tribute to acts and artists who have given significant contributions in the music scene in the Philippines.

Year	Award	Nominated work	Result	Ref
2017	Best Wishclusive Performance by a Young Artist	"Nobody Love"	Nominated	
2017	Wish Original Song of the Year by a Female Artist	"Dahan Dahan Dahan Lang"	Nominated	
2017	Wish Young Artist of the Year	"Herself"	Nominated	
2018	Wish Young Artist of the Year	"Herself"	Won	
2019	Wish R&B Song of the Year	"Maybe A Little Bit" (with Jay R)	Nominated	
2024	Wishclusive R&B Performance of the Year	"Don't Go Changing"	Nominated	

== Minor associations ==
Award ceremony	Year	Category	Result	Ref.
ASAP Pop Viewers' Choice Awards	2015	Pop Teen Sweetheart	Nominated	
ASAP Pop Viewers' Choice Awards	2015	Pop Teen Loveteam (with Bailey May)	Nominated	
ASAP Pop Viewers' Choice Awards	2016	Pop Teen Loveteam (with Bailey May)	Nominated	
Himig Handog P-Pop Love Songs	2016	MOR Choice Award	Won	
Himig Handog P-Pop Love Songs	2016	MYX Best Music Video	Won	
Himig Handog P-Pop Love Songs	2016	OneMusic.ph Favorite Interpreter Award	Won	
Himig Handog P-Pop Love Songs	2016	TFC Global's Choice Award	Won	
LionHearTV Awards	2015	Female Breakthrough Artist of the Year	Won	
PUSH Awards	2016	PushGram Newcomer	Won	
PUSH Awards	2016	PushPlay Newcomer	Won	
PUSH Awards	2016	Push Like Group/Tandem	Nominated	
PUSH Awards	2017	Push Music Personality	Nominated	
PUSH Awards	2018	Push Celebrity Squad of the Year	Nominated	
Star Cinema Awards	2015	Favorite TV LoveTeam (with Bailey May)	Nominated	
Star Cinema Awards	2015	Most Promising TV Star	Won	
Star Cinema Awards	2015	Trending Sensation Award	Nominated	

== Accolades from media ==
Key
‡	Indicates an accolade Ylona Garcia was the only winner

Publisher	Year	Category	Placement	Ref.
Pinoy Big Brother	2015	Teen Big 4	2nd	
PMPC	2015	"Female Celebrity of the Night"	Placed	
Yes! Magazine	2016	Most Beautiful Stars	Placed	
PUSH	2017	Push Elite	Placed	
