= Thrille Cine =

- Title card
- Genre: Horror
- Directed by: Ato Bautista
- Starring: Zanjoe Marudo; Roxanne Guinoo; Gerald Anderson
- Country of origin: Philippines
- Original languages: Filipino; Tagalog
- No. of seasons: 1

Original release
- Network: ABS-CBN
- Release: November 2, 2008

Related
- Walang Iwanan (October 2008)

Thrille Cine is a Filipino horror TV movie which originally aired on ABS-CBN on November 2, 2008.

== Plot ==
Sekreto Ni Secret Admirer (Secret Admirer's Secret)

Tikboy (Zanjoe Marudo), an ugly, shy, but kind-hearted mailman who is in love with Helen (Roxanne Guinoo), a woman mending a broken heart. Tikboy feels embarrassed to approach Helen because of his appearance; hence he decides to send her anonymous love letters. But when Helen starts to fall madly in love with the fictitious admirer, Tikboy gets caught in a more complicated web of lies.

Karera Sa Promosyon (Race To A Promotion)

Karera Sa Promosyon, follows Perez (Gerald Anderson), a young cop, who set to get a promotion. He believes that getting a promotion will enable him to influence fellow policemen to lead honest lives. As Perez gives his best to solve murder cases, he soon discovers a disturbing police secret.

== Cast ==
=== Sekreto Ni Secret Admirer (Secret Admirer's Secret) ===
- Zanjoe Marudo as Tikboy
- Roxanne Guinoo as Helen
- Niña Jose

=== Karera Sa Promosyon (Race To A Promotion) ===
- Gerald Anderson as Jesse Perez
- Dominic Ochoa
- Cholo Barreto
- Maui Taylor as Shirley
- Gerald Acao as Simon
- Bembol Roco as Chief of Police

== See also ==
- List of shows previously aired by ABS-CBN
