= Walang Iwanan =

- Starring: Charo Santos-Concio; Korina Sanchez; Pinky Webb; Karen Davila; Julius Babao; Cheche Lazaro; Henry Omaga-Diaz; Ces Oreña-Drilon; Bernadette Sembrano; Alex Santos; Kim Atienza
- Country of origin: Philippines
- Original languages: Filipino; Tagalog; English

Production
- Producer: ABS-CBN Corporation
- Running time: 76 minutes

Original release
- Network: ABS-CBN
- Release: October 12, 2008

Related
- Thrille Cine (November 2008)

Walang Iwanan is a documentary that original aired on October 12, 2008, on ABS-CBN. It features the biggest names in Philippine business presented by Charo Santos-Concio, president of ABS-CBN and hosted by the network's top anchors and hosts Pinky Webb, Korina Sanchez, Karen Davila, Julius Babao, Henry Omaga-Diaz, Ces Drilon, Bernadette Sembrano, Alex Santos, Kim Atienza and PROBE's Cheche Lazaro.

== Segments ==
- Yamang Pinaghirapan (Hard-earned Wealth)

- Soccoro Ramos by Pinky Webb
- Henry Sy by Ces Oreña-Drilon
- Lance Gokongwei by Julius Babao
- Lucio Tan by Bernadette Sembrano
- Manny Pangilinan by Karen Davila
- Cecilio Pedro by Kim Atienza

- Mahirap Maging Mayaman (It's Not Easy Being Rich)

- Ramon del Rosario by Alex Santos
- Fernando Zobel de Ayala by Cheche Lazaro
- Jose Concepcion Jr by Henry Omaga-Diaz
- Oscar Lopez by Korina Sanchez

== See also ==
- List of shows previously aired by ABS-CBN
