= Nathaniel (TV series) =

2015 Philippine television drama series

- Title card
- Genre: Christian drama
- Created by: Rondel P. Lindayag; Dindo Perez
- Developed by: Roldeo T. Endrinal; Julie Anne R. Benitez
- Written by: Shugo Praico; John Anthony Rodulfo
- Directed by: Darnel Joy R. Villaflor; Francis Xavier E. Pasion; Manny Q. Palo; Jon S. Villarin
- Creative director: Johnny delos Santos
- Starring: Marco Masa; Gerald Anderson; Shaina Magdayao
- Opening theme: "Lupa Man Ay Langit Na Rin" by Erik Santos
- Country of origin: Philippines
- Original language: Tagalog
- No. of episodes: 115

Production
- Executive producers: Carlo Katigbak; Cory Vidanes; Laurenti Dyogi; Roldeo Endrinal; Julie Anne Benitez
- Producers: Carlina D. de la Merced; Rosselle Beegee-Soldao; Mae Santos
- Production location: Laguna
- Editors: Marion Bautista; Froilan Francia
- Running time: 30-45 minutes
- Production companies: Dreamscape Entertainment Television; Mothership (visual effects)

Original release
- Network: ABS-CBN
- Release: April 20 – September 25, 2015

Nathaniel is a 2015 Philippine television drama series broadcast by ABS-CBN. Directed by Darnel Joy R. Villaflor, Francis Xavier E. Pasion, Manny Q. Palo and Jon S. Villarin, it stars Marco Masa, Gerald Anderson and Shaina Magdayao. It aired on the network's Primetime Bida line up and worldwide on TFC from April 20 to September 25, 2015.

== Summary ==
This is the story of Nathaniel, son of Paul and Rachel Laxamana. As a baby, Nathaniel will be involved in an accident which will cost him his life. Because he died a pure soul, Nathaniel became an Angel upon reaching Heaven. Once he is already 7 years old, he will be sent down to Earth for a mission – to restore people's faith in God, and to remind everyone of their inner kindness, which they may have already forgotten.

Nathaniel lives in Bayan ng Laging Saklolo, wherein he will be adopted by the Bartolome family, which includes Abner, Beth, Dimas, Hannah and Abi. With them, Nathaniel learns the value of having a family. During his stay in earth, Nathaniel will be able to help some people, including his real mother, Rachel, who is now separated from Paul. As he continues with his mission, Nathaniel learns that it was none other than his real father Paul, and his grandmother AVL, who have caused the people of Bayan ng Laging Saklolo to forget about their inner goodness. Nathaniel will do everything in his power to stop Paul and AVL from spreading more evil, without knowing that he is pushing Paul further away from Rachel. However, an evil entity known as the Tagasundo later emerges as the root of all evil and takes human form on Earth with a mission opposite to Nathaniel, to sway humanity from the path of good and will serve as an obstacle to Nathaniel's mission.

Nathaniel successfully defeated the "Tagasundo" with the help of the Three Archangels (Arnel, Josiah, and Eldon), The Other Angels who came down from heaven for the Final Battle, Our Lord Jesus Christ, and the restored faith in humanity sending the Tagasundo back to Hell.

Nathaniel bids farewell to his family, As he finally completed his mission he will watch over his family from heaven and continue to watch the newly changed Bayan ng Laging Saklolo.

== Cast and characters ==
=== Main cast ===
- Marco Masa as Nathaniel M. Laxamana/Nathaniel Bartolome
- Shaina Magdayao as Rachel Mercado-Laxamana
- Gerald Anderson as Paul V. Laxamana
- Coney Reyes as Angela " AVL " Villanueva-Laxamana

=== Supporting cast ===
- Pokwang as Elizabeth "Beth" Salvacion-Bartolome
- Benjie Paras as Abner Bartolome
- Isabelle Daza as Martha Amanthe / Mirriam Sandoval
- Sharlene San Pedro as Hannah Bartolome / Mary V. Laxamana
- Jairus Aquino as Joshua
- Jayson Gainza as Dimas Salvacion
- Ogie Diaz as Narcy
- Yesha Camile as Abigail "Abi" Bartolome
- Fourth Solomon as David
- Fifth Solomon as Solomon
- Simon Ibarra as Tomas
- David Chua as Aaron Quiroz
- Ivan Carapiet as Samson Baldemor
- JV Kapunan as Benjamin
- Kathleen Hermosa as Tessie Robles
- Freddie Webb as Punong Maestro
- Leo Martinez / Baron Geisler as Tagasundo (Note: Tagasundo is a demonic entity which assumed two different human forms assuming two identities through the course of the story. The character's identity as Abel "Ramon Roman" Tumana was portrayed by Leo Martinez, while Gustavo Palomar was portrayed by Baron Geisler.)

=== Guest cast ===
- Carla Humphries as young Angela "AVL" Villanueva-Laxamana
- Lui Manansala as Angela's mother
- Paolo Serrano as Norman Rivera
- Bodjie Pascua as Governor of Laging Saklolo
- Ingrid dela Paz as Leah
- Suzette Ranillo as Tita Lod
- Ana Abad Santos as Joshua's mother
- Dimple Magnaye as Abi's Friend
- JB Agustin as school bully
- Arvin Arellano as Nathaniel's classmate
- Nicco Manalo as kidnapper
- Dante Rivero as Serafin Pelaez
- Alicia Alonzo as Loida Pelaez
- Rosario "Tart" Carlos as Rita Jimenez
- Hero Angeles as Israel Marasigan
- Lance Lucido as Jonas Marasigan
- Lester Llansang as Dexter Malgapo
- Luz Valdez as Lola Gina
- Trina "Hopia" Legaspi as Sarah
- Arjo Atayde as Pedro Alvaro
- Gloria Sevilla as Lola Becca
- Xyriel Manabat as Camille
- Angeline Quinto as Jessie
- Mylene Dizon as Judith
- John Lloyd Cruz as Atty. Francisco Lucas
- Robert Seña as Heremias Masinayon
- Irma Adlawan as Heremias' wife
- Erin Ocampo as Heremias' daughter
- Eddie Garcia as Moises Macaraig
- Bryan Santos as Eliazar Domingo
- Maxene Magalona as Olivia Domingo
- Gabriel Sumalde as Joseph Domingo
- Sam Milby as Archangel Armen
- Rayver Cruz as Archangel Josiah
- Enchong Dee as Archangel Eldon
- Manuel Chua as AVL's killer
- Gretchen Barretto as Amy Russo

== Re-runs ==
The show began airing re-runs on Jeepney TV from October 24, 2016 to January 6, 2017; December 11, 2017 to March 2, 2018; March 1 to August 6, 2021; May 29 to October 20, 2023; November 9, 2024 to March 2, 2025 (also aired on ALLTV); and October 10, 2026 to February 7, 2027.

== Ratings ==
Kantar Media National TV Ratings (7:45PM PST)
Pilot Episode	Finale Episode	Peak	Average	Source
29.4% April 20, 2015	42.0% September 25, 2015	42.0% September 25, 2015	36.9%	

== See also ==
- List of programs broadcast by ABS-CBN
- List of ABS-CBN Studios original drama series
- List of programs broadcast by Jeepney TV
