= Paano na Kaya =

- Theatrical movie poster
- Directed by: Ruel S. Bayani
- Written by: Henry King Quitain; Kriz G. Gazmen; Ralph Jacinto Quiblat; Camille Andrea Mangampat
- Produced by: Charo Santos-Concio; Malou N. Santos
- Starring: Kim Chiu; Gerald Anderson
- Cinematography: Ramoncito Redoble
- Edited by: Marya Ignacio
- Music by: Raul Mitra
- Production company: Star Cinema
- Distributed by: Star Cinema
- Release date: January 27, 2010
- Country: Philippines
- Language: Filipino
- Box office: ₱100+ million

Paano na Kaya (lit. 'How Will It Be?') is a 2010 Filipino romance film directed by Ruel S. Bayani and starring Kim Chiu and Gerald Anderson (both from the top-rating primetime drama series Tayong Dalawa and Kung Tayo'y Magkakalayo, premiering last January 18). The film was released by Star Cinema.

The film also had international screenings in San Francisco, Los Angeles, San Diego, Seattle, Jersey City, Honolulu, Chicago, Las Vegas, Guam and many other cities around the world. The film is now available in DVD and VCD worldwide via ABS-CBN International's Starry Starry Store.

== Cast ==
- Kim Chiu as Mae Chua
- Gerald Anderson as Bogs Marasigan
- Melissa Ricks as Anna
- Ricky Davao as Roger Chua
- Rio Locsin as Tessie Chua
- Jon Avila as Anton
- Robi Domingo as JC
- Lloyd Samartino as Alvin
- Bart Guingona as Uncle Rick
- Janus Del Prado as Andoy
- Empoy Marquez as Kwek-Kwek
- Soliman Cruz as Mr. Castillo
- Guji Lorenzana as Louie
- Cai Cortez as Jubis
- Timothy Chan as Miguel
- Alwyn Uytingco as Gino
- Malou Crisologo as Manang
- IC Mendoza as Juding
- Zsa Zsa Padilla as Carmina Marasigan
- Bernard Palanca as Julius
- Rica Peralejo as Maan Chua

== Reception ==
Paano Na Kaya is screened in cinemas nationwide. It was given a "B" rating by Cinema Evaluation Board (CEB) and rated GP (General Patronage) by the Movie and Television Review and Classification Board.

According to Star Cinema, the film's 3rd week gross is over 100 million plus nationwide.
