= Kung Tayo'y Magkakalayo =

- Title card
- Genre: Romantic drama Family drama Action
- Created by: ABS-CBN Studios
- Written by: Rondel P. Lindayag; Ayi Tamayo; Mark Anthony Bunda
- Directed by: Erick C. Salud; Trina N. Dayrit; Dondon S. Santos
- Starring: Kris Aquino; Gabby Concepcion; Albert Martinez; Kim Chiu; Jaclyn Jose; Maricar Reyes; Gina Pareño; Gerald Anderson; Coco Martin; Max Eigenmann; Jessy Mendiola
- Theme music composer: Rey Valera
- Opening theme: "Kung Tayo'y Magkakalayo" by Gary Valenciano
- Country of origin: Philippines
- Original language: Filipino
- No. of episodes: 122

Production
- Executive producers: Roldeo T. Endrinal; Emerald C. Suarez
- Production companies: Dreamscape Entertainment Television; K Productions; CCM Creatives

Original release
- Network: ABS-CBN
- Release: January 18 – July 9, 2010

Kung Tayo'y Magkakalayo (International title: If We Were To Be Apart / transl. If We Are Far Apart) is a 2010 Philippine television drama series broadcast by ABS-CBN. Directed by Erick C. Salud, Trina N. Dayrit and Dondon S. Santos, The series features an ensemble cast consisting of Kris Aquino, Gabby Concepcion, Albert Martinez, Gina Pareño, Jaclyn Jose, Maricar Reyes, Gerald Anderson, Coco Martin, Max Eigenmann, Jessy Mendiola and Kim Chiu. It aired on the network's Primetime Bida line up and worldwide on TFC from January 18 to July 9, 2010, replacing Dahil May Isang Ikaw and was replaced by Noah in Agua Bendita's timeslot.

It is also part of the 60th Year of Pinoy Soap Opera Celebration.

== Synopsis ==
Celine is trapped in an unhappy marriage with Frank. One day, Celine was shocked to hear that Frank's plane crashed. While grieving the loss of her husband, she also discovered that Frank had an affair with Astrud and they had a love child named Ringo. Steve from NBI, was the investigator assigned to Frank's case. Later on, they became friends and fell for each other. They had an affair that nobody knew except Barry, Celine's best friend.

Eight months later, Frank was found alive. Celine walked away from her relationship with Steve for the sake of her marriage to Frank. However, she found out that she got pregnant by Steve. For the sake of her family, she told Frank that he is the father of her daughter, Gwen. From then on, Celine vows to be loyal to her family.

After nearly eighteen years, Celine is reunited with Steve. She learns that Steve is married to Selina. Celine realizes that she still loves Steve, but she knows that they are no longer meant to be. To make things more complicated, Gwen, who has grown into a pretty young lady, meets Robbie, the younger brother of Selina. Gwen and Robbie begin as enemies, but later fall in love.

== Cast and characters ==
=== Main cast ===
- Kris Aquino as Celine De Jesus-Crisanto – A perfectionist and domineering mother who was taken care of by a religious and kind grandmother. Celine does everything to become a good wife and tries to give her husband Frank a child but unaware that she is too strict to Gwen. Celine is harsh and jealous at Astrud and still secretly doesn't accept Ringo in her family. She finds out after her husband Frank is in an airplane crash she finds out that he has a child which hurts her. She falls for Steve but as she falls deeply and passionately, she is informed by Steve about Frank's appearance and how he is recently alive which makes her in dismay and what's worse she loses Steve and she has a child with Frank, but later finds out that it is her child with Steve.
- Kim Chiu as Gwen Marie Crisanto Sebastian-Castillo – Celine's rebellious teenage daughter with Steve and wife of Robbie Castillo. She hates her mother because Celine always wants perfection, but was spoiled by her father and Astrud. She will realize that throughout her rebelliousness the truth behind her family problems in fact, her mother's struggle to keep a secret, her father Frank being part of a syndicate and not truly her father by blood and how she must also help her family not to fall apart.
- Gerald Anderson as Robbie Castillo - Lost his parents at a very young age; was saved and raised by Steve. Robbie is protective of his elder sister Selina, who married Steve. He dropped out of the PNP Academy a year before graduating, he currently works at NBI with Steve. Husband of Gwen, and is determined to do everything for Gwen, he and his older sister Selina are the only two left but Selina dies at the half final weeks of the story. He demands justice for what has happened and convicts Ringo as he is enthralled in these family problems.
- Gabby Concepcion as Steve Sebastian – The biological father of Gwen. He saves Robbie as a child and takes him under his wing. Steve falls in love and marries Selina, Robbie's elder sister. He is an NBI agent who is dedicated to saving lives, but he still regrets not having saved his own (first) wife and their unborn child from death while she was working overseas.
- Albert Martinez as Francisco "Frank" Crisanto† (RX Gang code name: "Uno") series' main antagonist - Celine's airline pilot husband who was thought of as dead after a plane crash, but turns out to be alive after several months. He has a son, Ringo, with his co-worker, Astrud; due to an accident, he and Astrud become partners in crime in the latter parts in the story. He dies after being shot by his father Rustico Crisanto/Supremo.
- Coco Martin as Ringo Quijano Crisanto† series' main antagonist - Frank's out-of-wedlock son to Astrud, and with whom Gwen is raised as her brother. He is rebellious and believes he is abnormal because of his mental illness (bipolar disorder). Ringo looks up to his father and respects him so much that he gets himself (and his sister) in trouble following his wishes but he will dig deeper to the secrets his mother and father have kept. He is the one who witnessed Selina's death that leads him into Rustico's/Supremo's syndicate. He was shot and killed by Robbie.
- Gina Pareño as Petulah "Pet" Crisanto - Frank's overprotective mother. She loves Frank so much that she will do anything for him. She corrects every mistake Celine, Frank, or Gwen does. After becoming a widow, she raised Frank alone and did everything to give the best of everything to her son. Now that Frank has his own family, she still lives with them and gets in between their family affairs she will reveal truth as she sees her unknown husband alive and what secrets lurk around her and some that confront her.
- Jaclyn Jose as Astrud Quijano-Crisanto† series' main female antagonist - "As The Villain Killer Influence" - Co-worker of Frank, with whom she has a son, Ringo, due to an affair. She spoils Gwen so that Gwen would love her more as a mother and because she can't take Frank away from Celine. She becomes the most controversial antagonist as she will do anything for money her family and will give her son all of those things. She was shot by Celine and dies afterwards.
- Maricar Reyes as Selina Castillo-Sebastian† – Elder sister of Robbie. She and her brother lost their parents after they got shot. She worked abroad but came to find her parents dead. She lived in with Steve and decided to raise Robbie so he didn't feel as if not having a mother or father. She marries Steve as Robbie grows up as an adult, but finds out that she cannot produce a baby. Just when she was about to adopt a baby with her husband, Steve, she got kidnapped and shot. She dies but became part of the problems Celine faced being an employee, a friend, a sister, and a good in-law.
- Max Eigenmann as Anna Alicia Magdalena – She was the neighbor who lived beside Steve, Robbie and Selina's house. She was working too at an orphanage before she attended PNPA. As she attended the PNPA with Robbie, with whom she falls in unrequited love, but their relationship remains platonic. Left the PNPA a year before graduating, she currently works at NBI with Robbie and Steve.
- Jessy Mendiola as Cristina Angeles – She and Ringo meet at an aeronautics school and fall in love. Her dad (Mark Gil) is not supportive of their relationship, yet they continue their relationship in secret. Her father's family wants to move him for physical rehabilitation in the US, after a hit-and-run accident, so they are threatened by an imminent long-distance separation.

=== Supporting cast ===
- Gaby Dela Merced as Alina
- Bing Davao as Matt Cordero
- Thara Jordana as Kelly
- Reynold "Pooh" Garcia as Barry
- Paolo Serrano as Angelo, NBI Agent
- Nikki Valdez as Colby
- Erika Padilla as Diane
- Hiyasmin Neri as Brittany
- Ronaldo Valdez as Supremo†/Rustico Crisanto†
- Miriam Quiambao as Aludra
- Jhong Hilario as Jason† (RX Gang/Una Vita codename) / Agustin†
- Francine Prieto as Olivia Smith
- Tibo Jumalon as Roy Corpuz

=== Special participation ===
- Gloria Romero as Barbara De Jesus†
- James "Bimby" Aquino-Yap as Michael De Jesus Crisanto
- Angel Jacob as Gladys Sebastian†
- Fredmoore delos Santos as Nestor Callahon
- Janice Huang as Asha
- Menggie Cobarrubias as Astrud's medical doctor†
- Fred Payawan as Borg
- Bam Romana as Tonzy
- Wendy Valdez as Laura
- Marlon Mance as Dante, Laura's husband
- John James Uy as Mark
- Cassandra Ponti as Vega
- Gee-Ann Abraham as Aliya

=== Cameo appearances ===
- Phebe Khae Arbotante as young Gwen
- Yogo Singh as Robbie (5 years old)
- Empress Schuck as young Celine
- Sharlene San Pedro as young Selina
- Joseph Bitangcol as young Steve
- Nikki Bacolod as young Astrud
- Izzy Canillo as young Ringo
- Paul Salas as young Frank (10 years old)
- Elijah Magundayao as Ringo (8 years old)
- Christian Vasquez as young Rustico Crisanto/Supremo
- Gilleth Sandico as young Petulah
- Kristel Fulgar as young Aludra
- Angel Sy as young Alina
- Celine Lim as young Asha
- Ketchup Eusebio as NGO worker

== Production ==
On November 25, 2009, ABS-CBN released a teaser via their official YouTube account identifying the cast and characters. On December 27, 2009, ABS-CBN released its first full trailer during The Buzz showing its release date, January 18, 2010.

=== Launch ===
Kung Tayo'y Magkakalayo was launched as one of the ABS-CBN offering for the 60th celebration of Filipino Soap Opera during the ABS-CBN Trade Launch for the first quarter of 2010, entitled "Bagong Simula" (New Beginning).

=== Theme song ===
For the third time, Gary Valenciano sang the theme song for a series which stars Kim Chiu and Gerald Anderson. The other two were Tayong Dalawa and Sana Maulit Muli. The title of the series was derived from the song, "Kung Tayo'y Magkakalayo", which was originally sung by Rey Valera and covered by Gary Valenciano for the show. Other songs featured on the show are "Lapit" (lit. '"Come"') by Yeng Constantino and "Pagka't Mahal Kita" (lit. '"Because I Love You"') by Bugoy Drilon.

=== Leave ===
Kris Aquino left for half a month due to political reasons for her brother Noynoy Aquino as president. The show was to be extended until August, but due to taping reasons the show did not go through with its 8th month run as planned.

=== Production crew ===
- Associate Producers: Marissa Kalaw, Jhanice Casallo
- Production Assistants: Alma Cagalingan, Dianne Combalicer, Emerald Silvestre
- Locations: Analiza Anastacio, James Aquino, Lenlen Gatus, Edna Mendoza, Kremlin Bandiola, Halston Milanbilen, Luis Loberes
- Field Cashiers: Girlie Esguerra, Arvie Delos Reyes
- Art Directors: Rizza Fernandez, Agnes Lapdis
- Assistant Directors: Vincent Gaite, LA Madridejos
- Backpack Director: Avel Sunpongco
- Musical Directors: Jessie Lasaten Carmina Cuya
- Production Designer: Nancy Arcega
- Sound Engineer: Abet Casasas
- Lighting Directors: Alfredo Hernando, Ferdie Marquez and David Siat
- Master Editings: Jesus Mendoza Jr. and Ray-an Ludwig Peralta
- Director of Photography: Romy Vitug
- Story and Screenplay: Arlene Tamayo
- Executive Producer: Emerald C. Suarez
- Writers:Honey Hidalgo
- Production Manager: Dagang Vilbar
- Executive In Charge Of Creative: Rondel P. Lindayag
- Executive In Charge Of Production: Roldeo T. Endrinal
- Directions: Dondon S. Santos, Trina N. Dayrit and Erick C. Salud

== Reception ==
=== Ratings ===
The show premiered with a 34.4% household rating in the GMA Network-dominated Mega Manila Area. The show on ABS-CBN beat its rival program The Last Prince (31.7%) on GMA Network. The show was the #1 primetime series for the night, ranked second overall, behind GMA's newscast, 24 Oras at 35.7% in the Mega Manila TV Ratings based on AGB Nielsen Mega Manila data. The finale episode posted an impressive 14.5 people rating (not household rating) in the Mega Manila ratings beating its rival program (Endless Love) on GMA Network which posted a competitive 14.4 people rating. The show ranked #1 for the night in Mega Manila. ABS-CBN's Agua Bendita tied with GMA's Endless Love with 14.4 people rating each.

Based on the Kantar Media/TNS Nationwide TV Ratings, the pilot episode of posted an impressive 36.4% household rating while the finale episode mustered a whopping 42.7% beating its lead-in program, Agua Bendita (42.1%). Both of these programs are known to be one of the highest-rated successive pairs of regular Philippine primetime television series in any annual network programming lineup since ABS-CBN's reemergence as the dominant TV network in the nationwide ratings in 2009.

=== Awards ===
Year	Award-Giving Body	Category	Recipient	Result
2011	GMMSF Box-Office Entertainment Awards	Most Popular Love Team of Movies & TV	Kim Chiu and Gerald Anderson	Won
2011	GMMSF Box-Office Entertainment Awards	Most Popular TV Drama Program	Kung Tayo'y Magkakalayo	Won
2011	GMMSF Box-Office Entertainment Awards	Most Popular TV Directors	Erick Salud & Trina Dayrit (with Rich Ilustre)	Won

== See also ==
- List of programs broadcast by ABS-CBN
