= Philippine television drama =

Television dramas produced in the Philippines

Philippine television drama, also known as teleserye, is a form of melodramatic, serialized, televised fiction in the Philippines. Teleserye is derived from two Filipino words: "tele", short for "telebisyón" (television), and "serye" (series).

Teleseryes share characteristics with and have roots similar to soap operas and telenovelas. They have evolved into a genre with unique characteristics, however, and often reflect Filipino social reality. Teleseryes are aired in the afternoon and prime time, five days a week. Their audience crosses age and gender lines, and they have the highest advertising rates in the Philippine television industry. Series last from three months to a year or longer, depending on ratings.

Philippine TV dramas also include serials and anthologies, usually shown weekly. These dramas have a finite number of episodes and usually last one season, again depending on ratings.

== History ==
=== 1940s-1980s ===
Soap operas in the Philippines began with Gulong ng Palad (Wheel of Fortune) on radio in 1949 on DZRH. When television began in the Philippines in 1953, teletheater plays were the first drama shows to be broadcast, but soon soap operas began to be broadcast on the young medium. The first true Philippine TV soap opera was Hiwaga sa Bahay na Bato (Mystery at the Stone House) in 1963, produced by ABS-CBN. Larawan ng Pag-ibig (Picture of Love), Prinsipe Amante (Prince Amante), Mga Bayani sa Kalawakan (Heroes in Space) and a number of others followed, not only by ABS-CBN, but also by other channels that came after. ABS-CBN's Mallerva, debuting 1970, was among the first ever midday dramas ever to be produced and aired, and one of the first to be videotaped in color.

Gulong ng Palad, co-written by Loida Virina, was the longest-running radio serial and ran until the mid-1980s. Its TV version - produced by BBC-2, starred Marianne Dela Riva and Ronald Corveau and introduced young actors, including Romnick Sarmenta. Veteran actress Caridad Sanchez enhanced the series' popularity.

During the 1972–1986 martial-law period, the government closed several networks (including ABS-CBN), leaving, alongside BBC, RPN and GMA the Philippine's only three commercial television networks and the three that dominated local TV dramas. The lack of a diverse media base aided the emergence of nationwide satellite broadcasting, and competition between RPN and GMA, as well as the fact that the Intercontinental Broadcasting Corporation network had given up on TV drama production after the end of 1973-75's Dahong Ginto, its first original TV drama post-1972, spurred afternoon and prime-time sitcoms and serials. Philippine TV schedules resembled those in the U.S., with networks scheduling shows in daily time blocks instead of separate weekday and weekend programming, with US imports dominating after the evening news. But there was room for local drama to flourish.

RPN in 1978 launched María Flordeluna, starring Janice de Belén and based on a 1960 ABS-CBN Studios radio drama from Cebu City. Its cast included Dindo Fernando and actress-director Laurice Guillen. In response to its popularity, GMA in turn produced Anna Liza, starring the young movie star Julie Vega. Before the introduction of a TV ratings system in the Philippines during the 1990s, the two drama series were rivals in the primetime timeslots as lead-ins to the news. Anna Liza, cancelled in spring 1985 after Vega's death, had an unfinished storyline and a two-hour special in 1986, while the series itself was replaced in the early fall of 1985 by the short-lived Mirasol del Cielo, starting Sugar Benedicto and including veteran actress Anita Linda.

GMA by 1980, in response to the ratings hit that was Gulong ng Palad, launched its own high society drama series, Forbes, with an all-star cast headlined by Vic Silayan. Set in the residencial Forbes Park subdivision in Makati, it was a pioneer in this regard, one of the first modern TV dramas filmed in the country's financial capital.

Alongside the rise of primetime dramas, afternoon drama programming, which TAPE Productions pioneered for new audiences, soon broke out with the first modern afternoon drama in 1984, RPN's Heredero.

People's Television Network's Dulansining of 1977 marked its official debut in TV drama production, followed by 1978's Brocka Presents, directed by its namesake, film director Lino Brocka.

=== 1990s ===
Until the late 1980s, Philippine television dramas were broadcast during the afternoon. In 1986, ABS-CBN resumed operations after the end of the Marcos dictatorship and regained its audience lead by the end of the decade. In the early and mid-1990s, local sitcoms dominated Philippine television with the rise of ABS-CBN's Palibhasa Lalake, Home Along Da Riles, Oki Doki Doc and the political satire Abangan Ang Susunod Na Kabanata and GMA Network's Bubble Gang. International television swept the Philippines, beginning with Mexican telenovelas.

The 1990s are considered a golden age of Philippine television drama. Most, such as Agila, Anna Luna, Valiente and Mara Clara, were aired on ABS-CBN.

The most popular was the Las Tres Marias trilogy, produced by Televisa and starring Thalía. Marimar and Maria la del Barrio were broadcast in prime time on RPN. Maria Mercedes was broadcast on ABS-CBN. Major networks began to reschedule Filipino telenovelas in prime time to attract increased advertising revenue. By the mid-1990s, teledramas surpassed sitcoms in Filipino prime-time television.

One of the country's best-known TV series was Mara Clara, which aired from 1992 to 1997. The longest-running teledrama in the post-martial-law era, it had frequent time-slot changes before settling into the standard 7-8:00 pm prime-time block by late 1995.

In mid-1997, Mula sa Puso, another ABS-CBN series, saw the rise of Claudine Barretto. Barretto played the heiress Via in the two-year soap; Rico Yan and Diether Ocampo were her leading men, and Princess Punzalan played Selina, the series' most influential character. Mula Sa Puso was the Philippine's first middle-class primetime series, differing from the telenovelas with protagonists from the lower socioeconomic classes.

GMA retained and popularized its afternoon dramas, such as 1995–1997's Villa Quintana, with Donna Cruz, Keempee de Leon and Isabel Rivas. It was followed by 1997–1998's Ikaw na Sana, with Angelu de Leon and Bobby Andrews. Both were later moved to prime time.

ABC retained and popularized its afternoon drama, such as the 1999-2000 Paraiso. IBC's Ula ang Batang Gubat - the debut drama of Judy Ann Santos, was one of the network's hit primetime dramas of the early 1990s.

=== 2000s ===
Philippine television dramas evolved into teleserye, a portmanteau of the Filipino words telebisyon ("television") and serye ("series"). The term originated with the ABS-CBN drama Pangako Sa 'Yo, airing from 2000 to 2002 and starring Jericho Rosales and Kristine Hermosa, and the rivalry between actresses Eula Valdez and Jean Garcia. Pangako Sa'Yo, the Philippines' first teleserye, was considered a turning point in Philippine television because of its production and fast-paced, multiple-arc plotlines which distinguished it from telenovelas.

Broadcast in the Americas, Africa and Asia, it remains the most successful Philippine television series worldwide. At the end of its run in 2002, Pangako Sa 'Yo had the highest-rated series-finale episode of a Philippine show. Kay Tagal Kang Hinintay, which ended in 2003, was the Philippines' first series as a finalist in the Best Drama Series category of the 2003 International Emmy Awards.

ABC retained and popularized its primetime drama, such as 2000–2001, Gintong Pangarap.

ABS-CBN's 2004 Marina popularized the fantasy of most Filipino teleseryes. GMA Network's political drama Kung Mawawala Ka examined corruption, starring Eddie Garcia; it ran from 2002 to 2003 and received an award from the Philippine Movie Press Club (PMPC).

Sana'y Wala Nang Wakas, aired between 2003 and 2004, was the world's first drama series to allow viewers to choose a story's ending by texting. A contemporary ABS-CBN teleserye, Basta't Kasama Kita, starred Judy Ann Santos and Robin Padilla; notable for its depiction of the National Bureau of Investigation, it was the first Filipino series to broadcast a live series-finale episode in 2004. In 2004, GMA Network overtook ABS-CBN in popularity when it introduced an all-fantaserye prime-time lineup featuring female-lead shows such as Encantadia and Mulawin. GMA gained a ratings foothold with Darna, starring Angel Locsin.

The Philippines emerged as one of the world's largest television-drama-producing nations in the middle of the decade. International hits included ABS-CBN's 2006 Gulong ng Palad, starring Kristine Hermosa and TJ Trinidad, which was carried on TFC. A 2007 remake of Maria Flordeluna, which aired on RPN-9 in the 1970s and 1980s, starred Eliza Pineda. The 93-episode series received the 2008 PMPC Star Award for Best Television Series.

TV adaptations of films included ABS-CBN's Panday (starring Jericho Rosales and Heart Evangelista), Mga Anghel na Walang Langit and Kampanerang Kuba, starring Anne Curtis. The "sineserye" genre was introduced with Bituing Walang Ningning, starring Sarah Geronimo and Angelika de la Cruz.

2005 marked the start of domination of religious-oriented teleseryes, and trend of airing family-oriented drama series produced by ABS-CBN's Dreamscape Entertainment with Mga Anghel na Walang Langit which greenlighted in March 2005 and aired from May 2005 to February 2006, and lasted for 210 episodes. Religious and family teleseryes continued to dominate in the following years and decades.

Late in the decade, GMA-7 and ABS-CBN became rivals. GMA aired its 2007 remake of the international telenovela MariMar. Three ABS-CBN series became popular: the remake of the 1977–1985 soap opera Gulong ng Palad, the teleserye Sa Piling Mo and the series Maging Sino Ka Man—the most popular teleserye internationally after Pangako Sa'Yo.

In 2008 and 2011, the drama anthology series Star Magic Presents and Your Song became the longest-running drama anthology on ABS-CBN with a total of 100 and 239 episodes respectively.

In 2008, ABS-CBN produced its most expensive series, Lobo. It starred Piolo Pascual and Angel Locsin—the first Filipino nominated for an International Emmy for a lead role. I Love Betty La Fea, a Filipino remake of the Colombian telenovela Yo soy Betty, la fea, was broadcast in 2008. It was the most successful Philippine remake of a Latin telenovela since GMA Network's Marimar remake in 2007. TV5 series became popular: the remake of the 1995 live-action drama Batang X: The Next Generation.

=== 2010s ===
ABS-CBN and GMA Network both claimed to be the Philippines' most popular network. GMA Network began appealing to viewers in Mega Manila during the mid-2000s. ABS-CBN's prime-time shows attracted viewers in other parts of the country, particularly Visayas and Mindanao. Philippine media experts attributed the trend to ABS-CBN's return to Filipino programming.

The 2010s featured two successful teleseryes (Dahil May Isang Ikaw and May Bukas Pa). Dahil May Isang Ikaw began in the 2000s and ended in January 2010. May Bukas Pa that also started in the previous decade, however, underwent two versions which are the original ABS-CBN until February 5, 2010, without a deleted scene of the show's finale episode 263 was not aired, and extended and clean feed version without the network logo and MTRCB rating from July 2012 to December 5, 2013, initially online on TFC and continued on ABS-CBN's sister channel Jeepney TV, announced on February 28, 2013, from March 11, 2013, where the said scene is now aired, making it the first series to do so before the 2023–2024's Linlang, also by ABS-CBN, in the 2020s, and has a total of 263 episodes and 1 deleted scene, surpassing the 2005–2006's Mga Anghel na Walang Langit 210 episode count and 9-month run for being the most number of episodes and longest-running along the lineup of family-oriented shows of Dreamscape Entertainment on November 25 and December 2009 respectively, and remains the record nowadays.

Religious and family teleseryes continued dominating television from the late 2000s, since the greenlight of Mga Anghel na Walang Langit in March 2005. Among these religious and family teleseryes aired in the 2010s include May Bukas Pa, Agua Bendita, Momay, Noah, Mutya, 100 Days to Heaven, Budoy, Ikaw ay Pag-Ibig, Dahil sa Pag-ibig, Lorenzo's Time, Juan dela Cruz, My Little Juan, Honesto, Oh My G!, Nathaniel, My Super D, My Dear Heart, and Starla, all of which were aired on ABS-CBN, with May Bukas Pa later aired its extended version on Jeepney TV in 2013.

With the earlier success of the 2007 remake of Maria Flordeluna and the 2010 remake of Mara Clara, which introduced Julia Montes and Kathryn Bernardo, ABS-CBN popularized the revival of teen-themed telenovelas. Mara Clara's success inspired a remake of 1997's Mula sa Puso. In 2011, a number of actors moved between ABS-CBN and GMA Network. Both networks' hold on prime-time television was challenged by TV5's teleserye Babaeng Hampaslupa.

Teleseryes began to include storylines reflecting contemporary Philippine controversy. ABS-CBN's 2012 Walang Hanggan addressed adultery. The network's 2012–2013 series Ina, Kapatid, Anak explored surrogate motherhood.

GMA Network premiered the big-budget historical drama series Amaya, starring Marian Rivera. Rivera also appeared in Temptation Of Wife, the Filipino version of a popular Korean series, with Dennis Trillo. Trillo later appeared in the 2013 teleserye My Husband's Lover, the Philippines' first gay-themed prime-time series.

ABS-CBN's 2014 series, The Legal Wife, was followed by the 2015 remake of Pangako Sa 'Yo, starring Kathryn Bernardo and Daniel Padilla. The 2015 teleseryes Bridges of Love was broadcast as Puentes de Amor. The first Philippine drama aired in Latin America, it premiered in April 2016, on Panamericana Televisión in Peru. The 2017–2018 series Wildflower was the first Philippine prime-time teleserye to explore nepotism, human rights abuses and mental illness.

The 2010s marked the renewed popularity of long-running dramas after the early 2000s. May Bukas Pa underwent two versions which are the 2009–2010 cut on ABS-CBN and 2013 extended Jeepney TV. Be Careful With My Heart aired from 2012 to 2014. From 2014 to 2016, GMA broadcast The Half Sisters. ABS-CBN's afternoon teleserye Doble Kara ran between 2015 and 2017.

Ang Probinsyano, starring Coco Martin, attracted national attention for depicting the Philippine drug war and the Philippine National Police, despite renewed MTRCB censorship. It ran for 7 years, from September 2015 to August 2022. It holds the title as the Philippine's longest-running drama series since February 2020, surpassing the five-year run 1992–1997's of Mara Clara. Between 2016 and 2018, GMA Network dominated the late afternoon with its teleserye Ika-6 na Utos. Kadenang Ginto, also aired on ABS-CBN, premiered in October 2018, and ended in February 2020.

Live teleserye finales returned for the first time since GMA's 2007 remake of Marimar. ABS-CBN's On the Wings of Love starred James Reid and Nadine Lustre. Born for You was the first musical teleserye since ABS-CBN's 2006 TV version of Bituing Walang Ningning.

ABS-CBN's series 2019 military drama The General's Daughter was replaced by The Killer Bride, which has been praised for depicting the Duterte administration.

=== 2020s ===
Teleserye production was suspended In 2020 due to the COVID-19 pandemic. Interest in boys' love series developed after the Thai series 2gether: The series aired on ABS-CBN's Kapamilya Channel and blocktime agreement with ZOE Broadcasting Network through A2Z.

In February 2020, the action drama series FPJ's Ang Probinsyano surpassed the 1992–1997 series Mara Clara upon airing its 1,131st episode, with the former now the longest-running drama series on ABS-CBN and on Philippine television since the said date, thus breaking the record.

Domination of family and religious-oriented drama series continued in the 2020s, with teleseryes belonging to this genre including Huwag Kang Mangamba, top-billed by The Gold Squad (Andrea Brillantes, Seth Fedelin, Kyle Echarri, and Francine Diaz of Kadenang Ginto and ASAP Natin' To), Love in 40 Days, Maria Clara at Ibarra, and My Bespren Emman.

After almost 7 years of airing, FPJ's Ang Probinsyano ended in August 2022, after 1,696 episodes. It was replaced with the 2022 version of Darna, marking the temporary restoration of pre-September 28, 2015 ABS-CBN's primetime slot after its news program TV Patrol that was not seen since the start of airing of the said action drama series until it was replaced by FPJ's Batang Quiapo on February 13, 2023.

In 2024 and 2025, the drama series Abot-Kamay na Pangarap and Lilet Matias: Attorney-at-Law became the longest-running dramas on GMA Network with 659 and 258 episodes respectively.

== Impact ==
Philippine TV drama became popular during the early 2000s in Asia, Africa, and Filipino communities in North America. Teleseryes have evolved from the telenovelas on which they were based. Philippine teleseryes have also attracted audiences in Indonesia, Malaysia and China. Often dubbed into local languages, they are sometimes shown with English and other foreign subtitles.

ABS-CBN and GMA were among the first Asian television producers to export dramas with a universal message, reflecting the reality of Filipino and other Asian societies. Pangako Sa 'Yo is the Philippines' most successful TV series worldwide. Before leading the Chinese television ratings during the mid-2000s, the series was seen by over one billion viewers in Southeast Asia and Africa. ABS-CBN introduced its International Sales website, providing access to its shows. The network shows Sana Maulit Muli (Taiwan), Lobo (dubbed as She-Wolf: The Last Sentinel), Tayong Dalawa, Dahil May Isang Ikaw, Kahit Isang Saglit, Katorse, Mara Clara, Magkaribal, Be Careful With My Heart (Vietnam) and Walang Hanggan were exported. They were followed by Ina, Kapatid, Anak, May Bukas Pa, Forevermore, Till I Met You, Wildflower and Ang Probinsyano.

GMA Network has the highest-rated pilot episodes with Darna and Encantadia in 2005, and made fantaserye a popular genre. The network produced Boys Next Door, a teen melodrama which was the first Philippine television series aired in South Korea. The 2007 Philippine adaptation of MariMar, GMA's most successful domestic television series, was also aired in Thailand, Malaysia, China, Singapore, Indonesia, Cambodia, Vietnam, Uganda, Tanzania, Kenya and Hawaii. Other GMA shows, such as Habang Kapiling Ka, Kahit Kailan, Bakekang, Muli, Impostora, Mga Mata ni Anghelita, Dyesebel and Encantadia, are still broadcast elsewhere in Asia and Africa.

Ang Probinsyano has had a wide-ranging effect on Philippine pop culture and society. Called the Pambansang Teleserye, the series has been nominated for and received a number of awards The show is widely regarded for tackling timely issues, and has generated controversy for its negative portrayal of the government and its agencies. It was defended, with viewers saying that the government should take heed. The series has been considered a kingmaker, with a high endorsement value in the 2019 midterm elections, and is a desirable platform for actors wishing to run for public office.

A party list with the show's name, endorsed by series leads Coco Martin and Yassi Pressman, finished fifth in 2019 and won a seat in the House of Representatives. The series' lead character, Cardo Dalisay, has been called "steadfast and incorruptible". Ang Probinsyano is popular, and has been credited with reviving the action genre in film and television. Netflix streams the show under its international title, Brothers.

=== Adaptations ===
Philippine television dramas have spawned adaptations in other Asian countries:

- Impostora (GMA): Impostors, Cambodia, 2012
- Pangako Sa 'Yo (ABS-CBN): The Promise (សន្យាស្នេហ៍), Cambodia, 2013
- Sana'y Wala Nang Wakas (ABS-CBN): Cinta Tiada Ganti, Malaysia, 2018
- Kadenang Ginto (ABS-CBN): Putri Mahkota, Indonesia, 2020
- Love Thy Woman (ABS-CBN): Belenggu Dua Hati, Indonesia, 2020
- Sino ang Maysala?: Mea Culpa (ABS-CBN): Bukan Salah Cinta, Indonesia, 2020
- Tayong Dalawa (ABS-CBN): Angkara Cinta, Malaysia, 2020
- Hanggang Saan (ABS-CBN): Bir Annenin Günahı, Turkey, 2020
- The Legal Wife (ABS-CBN): Isteri Halal, Malaysia, 2023
- Forevermore (ABS-CBN): Vermem Seni Ellere, Turkey, 2023
- My Dear Heart (ABS-CBN): The Beloved (ချစ်လှစွာသော), Myanmar, 2023

== Popularity decline ==
- Currently, teleseryes are in an ongoing decline in viewership due to effects of ABS-CBN's shutdown and the popularity of vertical dramas through doomscrolling.

== See also ==
- Television in the Philippines
- List of Philippine drama series
  - List of ABS-CBN drama series
  - List of TV5 (Philippine TV network) original drama series
  - List of GMA Network original drama series
