= Angkara Cinta =

2020–21 Malaysian television series

- Promotional poster
- Genre: Melodrama; Romance; Action; Military fiction
- Based on: Tayong Dalawa by Rondel Lindayag
- Directed by: Hadith Omar
- Starring: Hun Haqeem; Meerqeen; Wanna Ali
- Opening theme: Angkara by Siti Nordiana
- No. of episodes: 115

Original release
- Network: Astro Prima
- Release: 2 November 2020 – 9 April 2021

Angkara Cinta (transl. Crime of Love) is a 2020 Malaysian television series based on Philippine drama Tayong Dalawa, directed by Hadith Omar, starring Hun Haqeem, Meerqeen and Wanna Ali. It was aired on Astro Prima, on November 2, 2020, every Monday to Friday at 18:00 (MST).

== Synopsis ==
Angkara Cinta tells the story of two men have the same name but different lives. Destiny finds two to be good friends. Apparently, Luqman and Haqeem share the same father. The situation becomes more conflicting when they share the same interest in one woman.

== Cast ==
=== Main ===
- Hun Haqeem as Luqman
  - Syed Irfan sebagai Luqman (young)
- Meerqeen as Haqeem
  - Gen Darwish as Haqeem (young)
- Wanna Ali as Adira
  - Nur Auni Zahra as Adira

=== Supporting ===
- Yuna Rahim as Jijie
- Syazwan Zulkifly as Remy
- Azhar Amir as Razlan
- Nina Juren as Mariani
- Sharifah Shahora as Indah
- Normah Damanhuri as Nek Milah
- Ku Faridah as Puan Liza
- Hamidah Wahab as Puan Ramlah
- Lydiawati as Laila
- Jalaluddin Hassan as Tuan Saddam
- Alif Muhaimin as Dino
- Roy Azman as Atan
- Alif Hadi as Leo
- Nasz Sally as Linda
- Razman Mahayuddin as Bob
- Asha Merican as Azura
- Fad Anuar as Helmi/Wira
- Nabil Aqil as Haris Ryan
- Shyrim Husni as Mohzan

=== Special appearances ===
- Sahim Wafiy as Faizul
- Ohsin Ahmad as Alisa
- Fiffy Afrina as Suri
- Faha Azha as Nico
- Hadith Omar (director) as Black
- Naiem Anuar as Adib
