= Ina, Kapatid, Anak (soundtrack) =

Soundtrack album by Various artists
- Recorded: 2012
- Genre: Pop, P-Pop, RNB, OPM
- Length: 38:25
- Label: Star Music

Singles from Ina Kapatid Anak
- 1. "Ngayon at Kailanman" Released: September 14, 2012; 2. "Kailan" Released: November 19, 2012; 3. "Ikaw Lamang" Released: December 10, 2012; 4. "Sa Isip Ko" Released: February 19, 2013

Ina, Kapatid, Anak is a soundtrack album of the Philippine drama series by the same name. It was released in the Philippines by Star Music on November 13, 2012, and it was released worldwide thru Amazon and iTunes. Ariel Rivera and Xian Lim provided songs for the soundtrack.

The lead single, "Ngayon at Kailanman", was released on September 14, 2012, along with the music video. It was sung by Ariel Rivera, one of the lead cast of the series.

== Track listing ==
No.	Title	Writer(s)	Artist(s)	Length
1.	"Ngayon at Kailanman"	George Canseco	Ariel Rivera	3:40
2.	"Ikaw Lamang"		Angeline Quinto	4:02
3.	"Kailan"		Bryan Termulo	3:54
4.	"Ikaw"		Erik Santos	4:03
5.	"Kung 'Di Sa Iyo"		Xian Lim
6.	"Ngayon at Kailanman" (Minus One)	George Canseco		3:40
7.	"Ikaw Lamang" (Minus One)			4:02
8.	"Kailan" (Minus One)			3:54
9.	"Ikaw" (Minus One)			4:03
10.	"Kung 'Di Sa Iyo" (Minus One)			3:40

iTunes bonus tracks
No.	Title	Artist(s)	Length
11.	"Sa Isip Ko"	Juris	3:42

== Singles ==
- "Ngayon at Kailanman"
- "Kailan"
- "Ikaw Lamang"
- "Sa Isip Ko"
