= Gerald Anderson =

Filipino actor (born 1989)

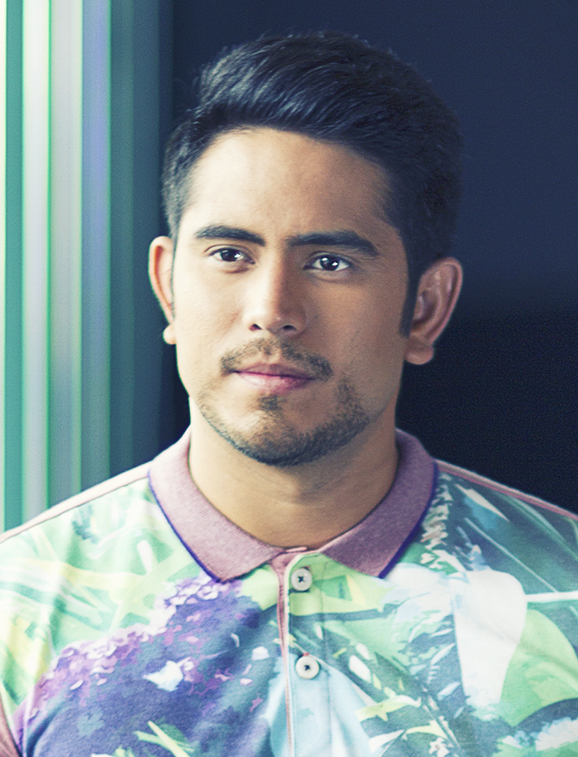
- Anderson in 2014
- Born: Gerald Randolph Opsima Anderson Jr. March 7, 1989 (age 37); Subic, Zambales, Philippines
- Citizenship: Philippines; United States
- Occupations: Actor; director; basketball player
- Years active: 2006–present
- Agent(s): Star Magic (2006–present TV5 Network (2021–present); Advanced Media Broadcasting System (2024–present)
- Notable work: PBB: Teen Edition Season 1; Sana Maulit Muli; Tayong Dalawa; Budoy; On the Job; Nathaniel
- Height: 1.80 m (5 ft 11 in)
- Basketball career

Personal information
- Listed height: 5 ft 11 in (1.80 m)

Career information
- Playing career: 2018–present
- Position: Point guard

Career history
- 2018–2019: Marikina Shoemasters
- 2019–2021: Imus Bandera
- 2021–2022: GenSan Warriors
- 2022: Boracay Islanders
- 2023–2025: Marikina Shoemasters/Marikina Verdiamonds Jewellers

Career highlights
- AsiaBasket Second Team (2023 Dasmariñas); 2× MPBL All-Star (2019, 2020)

Gerald Randolph Opsima Anderson Jr. (born March 7, 1989) is a Filipino actor, director and professional basketball player. He is managed by and under contract to Star Magic, ABS-CBN's talent agency.

Recognized as the "Action-Drama Prince" of the Philippine entertainment industry, Anderson is considered to be one of the most bankable lead actors of his generation. He is best known for his lead roles in the television series Sana Maulit Muli (2007), My Girl (2008), Tayong Dalawa (2009), Kung Tayo'y Magkakalayo (2010), Budoy (2011–2012), Mars Ravelo's Dyesebel (2014), and Nathaniel (2015), as well as the film On the Job (2013).

== Early life and background ==
Gerald Randolph Opsima Anderson Jr. was born on March 7, 1989, in Subic, Zambales, Philippines. His father is an American instructor in the Subic Naval Base who travels back and forth between the United States and Zambales while his mother is a Filipino businesswoman from General Santos, Philippines. He also has a younger brother (Kenneth Anderson) and two older sisters from his mother's first marriage. When he was three years old, he and his family moved from General Santos to San Antonio, Texas, and then to Springfield, Missouri, when he was six. Finally, at 14 years of age, his family moved back to General Santos.

Anderson demonstrates oral fluency in English, Tagalog, and Cebuano. He finished his elementary studies in San Antonio, Texas, and completed high school in General Santos, Philippines.

== Career ==
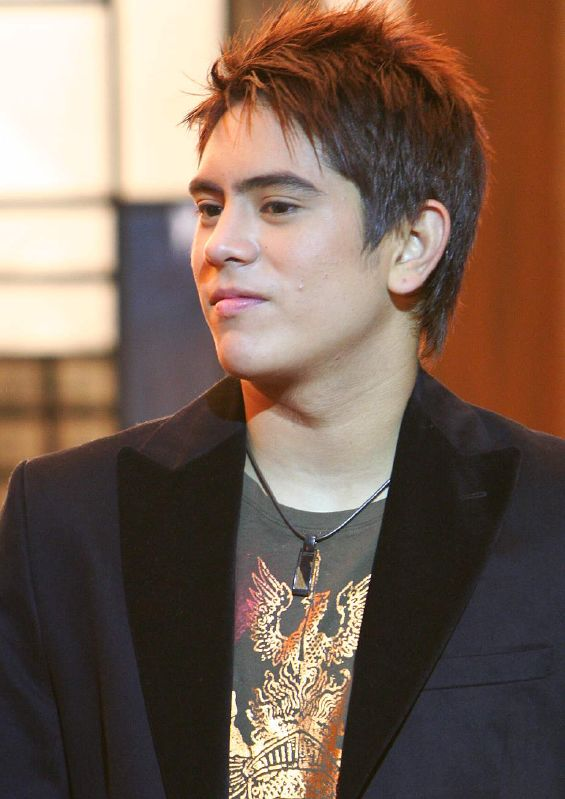
Anderson in 2006

Anderson was discovered by Joross Gamboa when Gamboa performed in Anderson's hometown. Gamboa introduced him to his manager, Jhun Reyes, who brought him to ABS-CBN for the first season of Pinoy Big Brother: Teen Edition. Anderson and the other housemates entered the Big Brother house on April 23, 2006. After 42 days, he was named Teen Third Big Placer on the show.

Six months later, Anderson and screen partner/then-girlfriend, actress Kim Chiu, appeared together on several ABS-CBN shows (including Love Spell and Aalog-Alog) and in the film First Day High. In 2007 Anderson and Chiu starred in their first primetime TV series, Sana Maulit Muli; in September of that year they appeared in their first feature film, I've Fallen For You, produced by Star Cinema. That year, he was the Best New Male TV Personality (for Sana Maulit Muli) at the 21st PMPC Star Awards and the 38th Guillermo Mendoza Memorial Scholarship Foundation Box Office Awards (with Chiu). In May 2008 Anderson and Chiu were cast in My Girl, an adaptation of the South Korean TV series.

In 2009, Anderson starred in the primetime drama series Tayong Dalawa, winning the Best Drama Actor award at the NSUU TV Awards; Anderson and Chiu were the Most Popular Loveteam for the third consecutive year at the Guillermo Mendoza Memorial Scholarship Foundation Box Office Awards. In August of that year, he appeared in Agimat: Ang Mga Alamat ni Ramon Revilla:Tiagong Akyat.

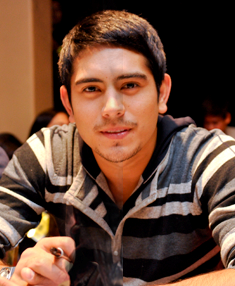
Anderson in 2010

The following year, Anderson started with Kim Chiu in the film Paano Na Kaya. He was cast in the ABS-CBN primetime drama Kung Tayo'y Magkakalayo, and appeared in Your Song Presents: Isla with his Pinoy Big Brother Unlimited former housemates. Anderson and Chiu teamed up again in October 2010 for the film Till My Heartaches End. That month, it was reported that the couple had ended their romantic relationship.

By the end of December 2010, Anderson announced his departure from Bench following his decision not to renew his contract due to busy commitments.

In 2011 Anderson first worked with Sarah Geronimo in a film collaboration with Star Cinema and Viva Films entitled Catch Me, I'm in Love (shown on March 23, 2011), and in October he returned in the primetime series Budoy (his first primetime television series without Chiu). He starred with Jessy Mendiola; Chiu had an adjacent time slot with her drama, My Binondo Girl with Xian Lim. In November 2011 Anderson made another film with Geronimo, Won't Last A Day Without You. He reunited in a movie with Chiu titled 24/7 in Love, Star Magic's ensemble film in view of the agency's 20th anniversary. He is starring as Miguel Dizon in the 2013 teleserye, Bukas Na Lang Kita Mamahalin alongside Dawn Zulueta and Kapamilya Leading Lady The Jewel of Drama Cristine Reyes.

Chalk Magazine's Top 50 Hottest Guys (2006–2008) and Number One Hokage (2013); Yes! Magazine's 100 Most Beautiful Stars (2007–2015, 2017), The Next Big Star (2011), and Top 20 Endorsers (2011); Candy Magazine's Top 3 Hottest Celebrity Cutie (2007) and Swoon-Worthiest Crushes (2008); Meg Magazine's Annual 50 Hottest Guys (2007, 2009–2010); Star Studio Magazine's Number #1 (2008), Sexiest Stars (2011), and Top 25 Most Intriguing and Inspiring People (2012); Cosmo Men Magazine's Top 1 Cosmo Celebrity Centerfold (2009); Inside Showbiz's Top 40 Hottest Men (2012); and Metro Magazine's Hottest Leading Men (2013)

== Basketball career ==
In May 2018, Anderson joined the Marikina Shoemasters in the Maharlika Pilipinas Basketball League. He also played for the team at the Chooks-to-Go Pilipinas 3x3, a three-on-three basketball league, debuting in the third tour of the 2019 President's Cup helping the team win their first game in the conference. They won over the 1Bataan Risers but was not able to clinch a win for the remaining of the third tour. He later joined Imus Bandera for the following season. After suiting up for Imus, Anderson joined the GenSan Warriors, a team based in General Santos which is also his hometown.

== Philippine Coast Guard ==
In 2016, Anderson joined the Philippine Coast Guard Auxiliary (PCGA) K9 Squadron Unit. In his interview with Bernadette Sembrano, he revealed that it was his parents who inspired him to join the Philippine Coast Guard with his father Gerald Anderson Sr., a retired U.S. Navy Officer and his mother's selfless acts of service. He was promoted Commodore in 2021. In August 2024, the Philippine Coast Guard's Ronnie Gil Gavan, Vice Admiral Jorge Lim and Armando Balilo bestowed the Search and Rescue medal upon Auxiliary Commander Anderson for his heroic rescue efforts during Typhoon Gaemi at Barangay Santo Domingo in Quezon City. He also financially helped the Zambales Aeta people, the Marawi families, and the Thitu Island children with PCGA Ensign Julia Barretto. In November, he was promoted officer of the Philippine Coast Guard Auxiliary with the rank of auxiliary captain and took his oath before 30th Commandant of the Philippine Coast Guard, Ronnie Gil Gavan.

== Other ventures ==
=== Business ===
Anderson owns 2 beach resorts in Zambales called: Tivera Resort and Hayati Private Resort. He expanded his resort business with a partnership with Solora Philippines. He also opened 2 fitness gyms. In 2024, he launched a sport business venture and founded, Got Game Philippines, a FIBA endorsed sports and talent scout company focused on 3x3 basketball in the country.

== Personal life ==
Anderson previously dated former onscreen partner and fellow housemate in Pinoy Big Brother, Kim Chiu, ending their relationship in 2010. In 2014, he admitted to having a relationship with actress Maja Salvador some time earlier than 2014, but broke up in 2015.

In 2016, Anderson rekindled his relationship with actress and How to Be Yours co-star Bea Alonzo, having previously dated in 2010. The couple separated in 2019.

In March 2021, during an interview with Boy Abunda, Anderson confirmed his relationship with Julia Barretto. They ended their relationship in 2025.

Anderson is fond of shoes and sneakers. He has massive collection of Nike Air Force 1s and Air Jordans in his walk-in closet. His room is also filled with Iron Man action figure collectibles. Anderson also has a collection of cars and vehicles.

== Filmography ==
=== Film ===
Key
†	Denotes films that have not yet been released

Gerald Anderson's film credits with year of release, film titles and roles
Year	Title	Role	Ref.
2006	First Day High	Michel "MJ2" Jordan, Ramirez	
2007	I've Fallen For You	Alex Reyes	
2008	Shake, Rattle & Roll X	Lui	
2010	Till My Heartaches End	Powie Barredo	
2010	Paano Na Kaya	Bogs Marasigan	
2011	Won't Last a Day Without You	Andrew Escalona	
2011	Catch Me, I'm In Love	Erick Rodriguez III	
2012	24/7 in Love	Alvin Cruz	
2013	On the Job	Daniel Benitez	
2015	El Brujo	Miguel	
2015	Everyday I Love You	Tristan Montelibano	
2015	Halik sa Hangin	Gio Magno Brauner	
2016	How to Be Yours	Niño San Vicente	
2016	Always Be My Maybe	Jake Del Mundo	
2017	AWOL	Lt. Abel Ibarra	
2017	Can We Still Be Friends?	Diego	
2018	My Perfect You	Burn Toledo	
2019	Between Maybes	Louie Puyat	
2022	To Russia with Love	Dennis Mercado	
2023	Unravel: A Swiss Side Love Story	Noah Brocker	
2025	Rekonek	Wes	

=== Television ===
Key
†	Denotes shows that have not yet been aired

Gerald Anderson's television credits with year of release, title(s) and role
Year	Title	Role	Ref.
2006	Pinoy Big Brother: Teen Edition	Housemates / 3rd place	
2006–2007	Love Spell	Various	
2006–2007	Aalog-Alog	Gerald Dean Padilla	
2006–2010	Your Song	Various	
2006–2015	Maalaala Mo Kaya	Various	
2006–present	ASAP XP	Dancer / Performer	
2007	John en Shirley	Gerald	
2007	Gokada Go!	Gabriel Fernandez	
2007	Sana Maulit Muli	Travis "Bokbok" Johnson	
2008	My Girl	Julian Abueva	
2008	Karera sa Promotion	Jesse Perez	
2008	Maligno	Joaquin	
2009	Tayong Dalawa	David "JR" Garcia Jr.	
2009	Banana Split	Various	
2009–2010	Agimat: Ang Mga Alamat ni Ramon Revilla	Santiago "Tiago" Ronquillo	
2010	Kung Tayo'y Magkakalayo	Robbie Castillo	
2011	Kasambuhay, Habambuhay: A Short Film Anthology	Himself	
2011	Wansapanataym: Buhawi Jack	Jack Isidro	
2011–2012	Budoy	Benjamin "Budoy" Maniego	
2012	Toda Max	Captain Buddy Torres	
2013	Goin' Bulilit	Various	
2013	Bukas na Lang Kita Mamahalin	Miguel Dizon	
2014	Team U	Himself	
2014	Mars Ravelo's Dyesebel	Fredo Montilla	
2014–2015	Give Love on Christmas: Gift of Life	Tristan Ramos	
2015	Nathaniel	Paul Laxamana	
2017–2018	Ikaw Lang ang Iibigin	Gabriel Villoria	
2020	A Soldier's Heart	Alexander "Alex" Marasigan	
2021	Hello, Heart	Saul de Vera	
2021	Init sa Magdamag	Christopher "Tupe" Salcedo	
2022	A Family Affair	Paco Estrella	
2025	Sins of the Father	Samuel Trinidad	
2026	BuyBust: The Undesirables †		
2026	Blood vs Duty	Jalil Abubakar / P/Maj. Allan Espina / Gabriel Reyes	

=== Music videos ===
- "Love Team" - Itchyworms, Noontime Show (2006)
- "Crazy Love" - Kim Chiu, Gwa Ay Di (2007)
- "Your Name" - Young JV, Doin' It Big (2012)
- "Pinoy Summer, Da Best Forever" - Gerald Anderson and Sarah Geronimo (2012)
- Unang Kilig - Bini (2026)

== Discography ==
=== Dance albums ===
- Gerald's Dance Pick (2006)
- Gerald's Noodle Dance (2007)

== Accolades ==
=== Performance awards ===
Work	Event	Award ceremony	Year	Result	Ref.
Budoy	ASAP Pop Viewers' Choice Awards	Pop Kapamilya TV Hokage	2012	Won	
Budoy	PMPC Star Awards for TV	Best Drama Actor	2012	Nominated	
Budoy	Gawad Tanglaw	Best Performance by an Actor	2013	Won	
Budoy	Golden Screen TV Awards	Best Performance by an Actor	2013	Won	
Budoy	KBP Golden Dove Awards	Best Actor	2013	Won	
Budoy	New York Festival's Television & Films Awards	Drama	2013	Nominated	
Budoy	NSUU Students Choice Awards	Best Actor in a Primetime Teleserye	2013	Won	
Bukas Na Lang Kita Mamahalin	PMPC Star Awards for TV	Best Drama Actor	2014	Nominated	
Catch Me, I'm in Love	ASAP Pop Viewer's Choice Awards	Pop Screen Kiss (with Sarah Geronimo)	2011	Nominated	
Everyday I Love You	PMPC Star Awards for Movies	Movie Supporting Actor of the Year	2016	Nominated	
First Day High	ASAP Pop Viewers' Choice Awards	Pop Love Team (with Kim Chiu)	2006	Won	
Kimerald	ASAP Pop Viewers' Choice Awards	Pop Fans Club (with Kim Chiu)	2011	Won	
Kung Tayo'y Magkakalayo	ASAP Pop Viewers' Choice Awards	Pop TV Actor (with Kim Chiu)	2010	Won	
Kung Tayo'y Magkakalayo	ASAP Pop Viewers' Choice Awards	On-Screen Kiss (with Kim Chiu)	2010	Won	
"Love Team" by Itchyworms	ASAP Pop Viewers' Choice Awards	Pop Celebrity Love Team (with Kim Chiu)	2007	Won	
"Love Team" by Itchyworms	Myx Music Award	Favourite Guest Appearance in a Music Video (with Kim Chiu)	2008	Won	
Maalaala Mo Kaya: Bituin	Gawad Tanglaw Awards	Best Single Performance by an Actor	2014	Won	
Maalaala Mo Kaya: Class Picture	Gawad Tanglaw Awards	Best Single Performance by an Actor	2016	Won	
Maalaala Mo Kaya: Jacket	PMPC Star Awards for Television	Best Single Performance by an Actor	2012	Nominated	
Maalaala Mo Kaya: Jacket	Golden Screen TV Awards	Outstanding Performance of an Actor in a Single Drama	2013	Nominated	
Maalaala Mo Kaya: Lubid	PMPC Star Awards for Television	Best Single Performance by an Actor	2010	Won	
Maalaala Mo Kaya: Lubid	Sisa Media Awards	Outstanding Featured Male Character in a Drama Program	2010	Won	
Maalaala Mo Kaya: Lubid	Gawad Tanglaw Awards	Best Single Performance by an Actor	2011	Won	
My Girl	ASAP Pop Viewers' Choice Awards	Pop TV Star of the Year	2008	Won	
My Girl	Nickelodeon Philippines Kids' Choice Awards	Favourite Actor	2008	Nominated	
Nathaniel	PMPC Star Awards for Television	Best Drama Actor	2015	Nominated	
On The Job	FAMAS Awards	Best Actor	2014	Nominated	
On The Job	Gawad Pasado Awards	Best Supporting Actor	2014	Won	
Sana Maulit Muli	ASAP Pop Viewers' Choice Awards	Pop TV Award (with Kim Chiu)	2007	Won	
Sana Maulit Muli	PMPC Star Awards for Television	Best New TV Personality	2007	Won	
Tayong Dalawa	NSUU TV Awards	Best Actor	2010	Won	
Tayong Dalawa	USTv Students Choice Awards	Best Drama Actor	2010	Nominated	
Till My Heartaches End	ASAP Pop Viewers' Choice Awards	Pop Loveteam (with Kim Chiu)	2011	Won	
Till My Heartaches End	ASAP Pop Viewers' Choice Awards	Pop Screen Kiss (with Kim Chiu)	2011	Won	
"Whisper, I Love You"	Myx Music Awards	Favourite Media Soundtrack	2010	Nominated	
Your Song	PMPC Star Awards for Television	Best Drama Actor ("My Only Hope")	2009	Nominated	
Your Song	PMPC Star Awards for Television	Best Drama Actor ("Isla")	2010	Nominated	

=== Personality Awards ===
Year	Awarding body	Award	Result	Ref.
2007	Anak TV Seal Award	Most Admired TV Personality	Won	
2007	Box Office Entertainment Awards	Most Popular Love Team (with Kim Chiu)	Won	
2007	Meg Magazine Teen Choice Awards	Cutest Couple (with Kim Chiu)	Won	
2007	Yes! Magazine Readers' Choice Awards	Next Rising Star	Won	
2008	Anak TV Seal Award	Most Admired Male TV Actor	Won	
2008	Box Office Entertainment Awards	Most Popular Love Team (with Kim Chiu)	Won	
2008	Inside Showbiz Magazine	Most Popular Male Teen Star	Won	
2008	Meg Magazine	Favourite Celebrity Couple (with Katie Chiu)	Won	
2009	ASAP Pop Viewers' Choice Awards	Pop Pin-Up Award	Won	
2009	Box Office Entertainment Awards	Most Popular Actor in Movies & Television (with Kim Chiu)	Won	
2009	FAMAS Award	German Moreno Youth Achievement Award	Won	
2009	Myx Music Awards	Favourite Myx VJ	Nominated	
2009	People Asia Magazine	People of the Year Special Awardee	Won	
2009	Starmometer's Coverguy	Personality of the Year	Won	
2009	Yes! Magazine	The Prince of Metro Manila	Won	
2010	Box Office Entertainment Awards	Prince of Actor Movies & TV	Won	
2010	Eastwood City Walk of Fame		Won	
2010	Star Studio	Player of the Game	Won	
2010	Star Studio Celebrity Awards	Star Hokage Award	Won	
2011	Barkada Choice Awards	Choice Male Icon of the Year	Won	
2011	Gerald Anderson Charity Basketball Tournament	Basketball MVP	Won	
2011	NSUU Students Choice Awards	Best Actor in Primetime Teleserye	Won	
2011	Star Magic Sports Fest	Basketball MVP	Won	
2011	Us Girls Awards	Most Fashionable Man	Won	
2012	Anak TV Seal Awards	TV Actor Award	Won	
2012	ASAP Pop Viewers' Choice Awards	Pin-up Boy	Nominated	
2012	Box Office Entertainment Awards	Prince of Nation	Won	
2012	Star Magic Sports Fest	Basketball MVP	Won	
2012	Star Magic Sports Fest	Star Fastest Athlete	Won	
2012	Star Magic Sports Fest	Three Point Shooter	Won	
2012	Star Magic Ball Awards	Hot LeCoupé Award	Won	
2012	Yahoo OMG Awards	Personality of the Year	Nominated	
2012	Yahoo OMG Awards	Love Team of the Year (with Sarah Geronimo)	Nominated	
2013	Star Magic Ball	Best Actor (with Maja Salvador	Won	
2014	FAMAS Awards	Male Actor Star of the Night	Won	
2014	FAMAS Awards	Male Actor of the Night	Won	
2014	PEP Lists	Actor of the Year	Nominated	
2015	Star Magic Sports Fest	Best Male Actor	Won	
2015	Star Magic All Star Basketball in Winnipeg	Basketball MVP	Won	
2017	Star Magic OPPO All-Star Basketball Game	MVP	Won	
