= Sana Maulit Muli (TV series) =

2007 Philippine television drama series

- Title card
- Also known as: Chances
- Genre: Drama; Romance
- Created by: ABS-CBN Studios
- Written by: Philip King
- Directed by: Jerome Chavez Pobocan; Claudio Tots Sanchez-Mariscal IV
- Starring: Kim Chiu; Gerald Anderson; Erich Gonzales; Jake Cuenca
- Theme music composer: Gary Valenciano; Angeli Valenciano
- Ending theme: "Sana Maulit Muli" by Gary Valenciano
- Country of origin: Philippines
- Original language: Tagalog
- No. of episodes: 73

Production
- Executive producers: Roldeo T. Endrinal; Brenda Lee Estocapio
- Running time: 20–25 minutes
- Production company: Dreamscape Entertainment

Original release
- Network: ABS-CBN
- Release: January 8 – April 20, 2007

Sana Maulit Muli (International title: Chances / transl. I hope it happens again) is a 2007 Philippine television drama series broadcast by ABS-CBN. Directed by Jerome Chavez Pobocan and Claudio Tots Sanchez-Mariscal IV, it stars Kim Chiu and Gerald Anderson. It aired on the network's Primetime Bida line up from January 8 to April 20, 2007, replacing Crazy for You and was replaced by Walang Kapalit.

A film with the same title was made in 1995, and stars Aga Muhlach and Lea Salonga, produced by Star Cinema. The series was sold to TBS, entitled Chances. It was dubbed in Taiwanese, and premiered on February 18, 2008.

== Plot ==
=== Book 1 ===
Sana Maulit Muli is about two young lovers who discover how true love can overpower fate and destiny.

Small-town girl Jasmin Sta. Maria (Kim Chiu) and Travis Johnson (Gerald Anderson), the illegitimate son of an American soldier, meet as stowaways in a ship sailing from Cebu. They promise to write each other as they were separated; this promise is intercepted as soon as Camille Soriano (Erich Gonzales) deceives Travis by writing to him as Jasmin. In time, Travis' father dies and their family leaves for the Philippines only to meet up with Camille and consequently Jasmin.

A rocky start between Jasmin and Travis, when Jasmin was assigned to tutor him after a school brawl, turns into friendship then real love. Jasmin learns later on of Camille's deception and soon after learns that Camille is her younger sister.

To make amends with her sister, Jasmin gives away everything for Camille's happiness leading to the break-up. Due to the taunting of Travis' brother Brandon (Jake Cuenca), a twist ensues as Jasmin dies by a bus accident.

=== Book 2 ===
Given a chance to change destiny by the mysterious Mang Andres (Michael de Mesa), Travis leaps back in time to be with the person that he loves.

George (Tonton Gutierrez) and Clara (Glydel Mercado) are Camille's adoptive parents, and Jasmin's mother Emily (Mickey Ferriols) is Camille’s biological mother. It is then revealed later on that George is the biological father of both Jasmin and Camille, as he was previously in a relationship with Emily. Camille was diagnosed with heart disease as a baby. Due to desperation as she could not afford treatment for her youngest daughter at the time, Emily gives up Camille for George and Clara to raise after the loss of their own child. Eventually, George lets Emily and Jasmin live at his home as house help, with Emily in particular being Camille’s nanny, under the exception that they do not tell Camille or Clara the whole truth.

Bianca (Neri Naig) is Clara’s sister. She is a photographer from Boston who moves back after breaking up with her boyfriend. Brandon is falling head over heels for Bianca and she does as well, after all his visits to her photo shop. Finally, Bianca gives in, and accepts that she loves Brandon, sleeping in his condo for the night which results in her getting pregnant.

Travis attempts to let Jasmin love him but the fact that Jasmin does not know about their love hinders him. Despite Mang Andres' request to Travis of not to reveal what he knows about the past, he stubbornly continues to try to change everything. Every time Travis reveals something from the past, it ultimately causes a ripple in time. For one, he confronts Camille about her lie on being Poknat. Camille insists that she is indeed the real Poknat by singing Poknat and Bokbok's song and showing Travis the heart of the friendship, the sandal (which in Book 1 Camille did not have). Thus, instead of trying to gain Jasmin's love again, Travis could ultimately be changing the fabric of time for the worse; for example, Clara dies in a fire because of Travis. Jasmin realizes because of her life that Travis is saving, other people are dying in exchange for her life. But earlier, because Travis saved at the bet, Jasmin and Travis won't be disturbed by him and they can finally be together again. As the time comes closer, Travis tries to save Jasmin's life but is mistaken to have mental problems since his paranoia for Jasmin's safety is becoming worse. He's then confined in a hospital.

As the night of Jasmin's death comes, Travis goes through different escapades to escape the hospital, to save her. Finally getting to see each other, Jasmin, still afraid but willing to die, promises to fight for her life. As the moment arrives, an out-of-control truck hits Jasmin and Travis, which left Jasmin safe and Travis in critical condition. Fully shocked by what had happened, Jasmin makes a deal with Mang Andres to keep Travis alive, in exchange for her life. But all plans fail when Travis pursues to die to save Jasmin from dying again. Just in time Jasmin is saved by her parents. Opposite from Book 1, everyone mourns Travis' death, except for Jasmine, because she believes in her heart that Travis and she will be together again. Before going back to the United States, Travis' mother, Monica, leaves all of his belongings to Jasmin, as she knows Travis would've wanted her to have them. Jasmin sees the watch that brought Travis back in time. Jasmin goes back in time, during her happiest times with Travis and far away from danger.

With that happening, Mang Andres finally decides to let Jasmin and Travis be, leaving all of them happy and alive. In conclusion, Brandon and Bianca are a happy couple, married and in love, with a new baby son. Jasmin goes to law school and Travis becomes a doctor. She soon graduates and becomes a successful lawyer. Camille becomes a happy teacher. Jasmin and Travis soon marry and are happily together.

== Cast ==
=== Main cast ===
- Gerald Anderson as Travis "Bokbok" Johnson
- Kim Chiu as Jasmin "Poknat" Sta. Maria / Jasmin S. Soriano-Johnson

=== Supporting cast ===
- Erich Gonzales as Camille E. Soriano / Camille S. Soriano
- Jake Cuenca as Brandon Johnson
- Gloria Diaz as Monica Johnson
- Mark Bautista as Francis Marquez
- Mickey Ferriols as Emily Sta. Maria
- Tonton Gutierrez as George Soriano
- Michael de Mesa as Mang Andres
- Glydel Mercado as Clara Espino-Soriano
- Arron Villaflor as Kevin Roque
- Neri Naig as Bianca Espino-Johnson
- Nathan Lopez as Romeo Bato
- Marco Aytona as Bruce
- Kyle Balili as Tam
- Frank Garcia as Pete

=== Special participation ===
- Jeffrey Santos as Arnold Bato
- Cheska Iñigo as Maria Bato
- Celine Lim as young Jasmin
- Francis Magundayao as young Travis
- Khaycee Aboloc as young Camille
- Rosendo Leswe as young Kulot

== Soundtrack ==
An original soundtrack was made by ASAP Music and distributed by Star Music for the series.

1. "Say You'll Never Go" by Erik Santos
2. "I Remember the Boy" by Sheryn Regis
3. "Umaasa lang Sayo" by Six Part Invention
4. "Maalala Mo Sana" by Silent Sanctuary
5. "Mine" by Kim Chiu
6. "Hiling" by Frio

== International broadcast ==
=== Taiwan release ===
This series was sold to TBS under the PTS network, entitled Chances. It was dubbed in Taiwanese, and premiered on February 18, 2008. Bong R. Osorio, head of ABS-CBN’s corporate communication said that the rights to air the series in Taiwan costed the TBS, "millions of pesos" and described the series of garnering a "steady base of loyal Taiwanese fans".

=== Vietnamese release ===
The show was aired on Echannel VTVCab5 under the name "Kỳ Duyên Hội Ngộ" in 2015.

== Accolades ==
Year	Film Award/Critics	Award	Result
2007	21st PMPC Star Awards for Television	Best New Male TV Personality (Gerald Anderson)	Won
2007	21st PMPC Star Awards for Television	Best New Female TV Personality (Kim Chiu)	Won
2007	ASAP Pop Viewers Choice Awards 2007	Pop TV Show of the Year	Won
2007	ASAP Pop Viewers Choice Awards 2007	Pop TV Character of the Year (Bokbok and Poknat)	Won
