= Tayong Dalawa =

- Title card
- Also known as: The Two of Us
- Genre: Romance; Melodrama; Action; Military fiction
- Created by: ABS-CBN Studios; Rondel Lindayag
- Written by: Reggie Amigo; Mark Anthony Bunda; Danica Domingo; Dindo Perez
- Directed by: Ruel S. Bayani; Trina N. Dayrit
- Starring: Gerald Anderson; Jake Cuenca; Kim Chiu
- Music by: Carmina Cuya
- Opening theme: "Tayong Dalawa" by Gary Valenciano
- Composer: Rey Valera
- Country of origin: Philippines
- Original language: Filipino
- No. of episodes: 178; 1 special episode (The Untold Beginning)

Production
- Executive producers: Carlo L. Katigbak; Cory V. Vidanes; Laurenti M. Dyogi; Roldeo T. Endrinal; Julie Anne R. Benitez
- Producers: Emerald Suarez; Kylie Manalo-Balagtas
- Production locations: Metro Manila; Antipolo; Baguio; Hong Kong
- Running time: 30 minutes (Philippines); 60 minutes (Indonesia, Singapore, Malaysia, Uganda, Vietnam)
- Production company: Dreamscape Entertainment Television

Original release
- Network: ABS-CBN
- Release: January 19 – September 25, 2009

Tayong Dalawa (International title: The Two of Us) is a 2009 Philippine television drama series broadcast by ABS-CBN. Directed by Ruel S. Bayani and Trina N. Dayrit, it stars Jake Cuenca, Gerald Anderson and Kim Chiu. It aired on the network's Primetime Bida line up and worldwide on TFC from January 19 to September 25, 2009, replacing Dyosa and was replaced by Lovers in Paris. The title of the series was taken from one of Rey Valera's classic songs, in a manner similar to most Filipino soap operas.

== Plot summary ==
David "JR" Garcia Jr. was born into a poor family. His father, David Sr., deserted his mother Marlene Dionisio before he was born because his wife, Ingrid Martinez is pregnant with David "Dave" Garcia Jr.

When Audrey King and her family go to Tagaytay for a visit, she falls from a set of high stairs. JR saves her life and introduces himself as David Garcia Jr. after she asks for his name without seeing what he looked like. When Audrey is admitted to the emergency room and is asked by the witnesses and her family who saved her, she remembers the name David Garcia Jr. - however, Dave is given the credit instead of JR.

As Audrey grows up falling in love with Dave, Dave meets JR and they become the best of friends, but their families do not approve of their friendship. Dave's family thinks JR wants to use Dave for money. The siblings' mothers would not let the two hang out, although Dave's father allowed the friendship to continue. Dave's grandmother, Elizabeth, and JR's mother, Marlene, suspects David Sr. is keeping the two boys' friendship alive.

Audrey's father, Stanley Sr., sends her to Cebu to continue her studies. JR and Audrey have a chance encounter in the airport. Dave and JR enter the Philippine Military Academy where they graduate at the top of their class. The family rivalry worsens as everyone finds out that Dave and JR are half-siblings when David Sr. appears on graduation day. Elizabeth exerts all efforts to cover up the truth to the point that she engineers Marlene's imprisonment. David Sr. is killed by gun smuggling boss Leo Cardenas during a robbery on his armory on the suggestion of Ramon Lecumberri, JR's estranged older half-brother. It is followed by more events such as the death of Audrey's mother Loretta after giving birth to her last child Robert, Ramon killing Leo to save Lola Gets and taking over the syndicate, and the involvement of Audrey's younger brother Stan in the syndicate. Further DNA testing confirms that Dave and JR are Marlene's twins and that Ingrid's stillborn son was swapped by Elizabeth with Dave (originally named David John by Marlene).

As things develop, Stanley kills Elizabeth over a financial dispute and frames JR, who is imprisoned and escapes with a former enemy, Ka Doroy, as part of a double agent operation with the military in order to infiltrate the syndicate. He discovers that the syndicate's boss, "Hunyango", is actually Marlon Cardenas, Dave's godfather and Leo's father.

After JR is hit in a later incident, Dave agrees to a kidney transplant to save his twin in exchange for a civil wedding to Audrey, but the marriage turns out to be fake because of Elizabeth's machinations. Dave and Audrey plan a church wedding, but Dave backs out. Audrey ends up marrying JR in church and later bears him a son named Adrian. However, she dies of heart disease a few days after giving birth.

The brothers eventually face off in a final showdown with Ramon, who agrees to surrender after Marlene's appeals and completing a plan to bring down his syndicate. However, a mentally-insane Ingrid shoots Ramon in the head while being taken into custody. He survives the shooting but is rendered blind by his injuries. Dave later commits Ingrid to a psychiatric hospital. Ramon is sentenced to life imprisonment and makes amends with Marlene, JR, and Dave behind bars. The three, who visit Ramon from time to time, now live together with Angela, Lily, Ula the nanny, Robert, and Adrian. The story ends with a cliffhanger: a woman and her son appears at the Garcia house one evening and introduce themselves as Emma Garcia (a third wife of David Garcia Sr.) and David Anthony Garcia III.

== Cast and characters ==
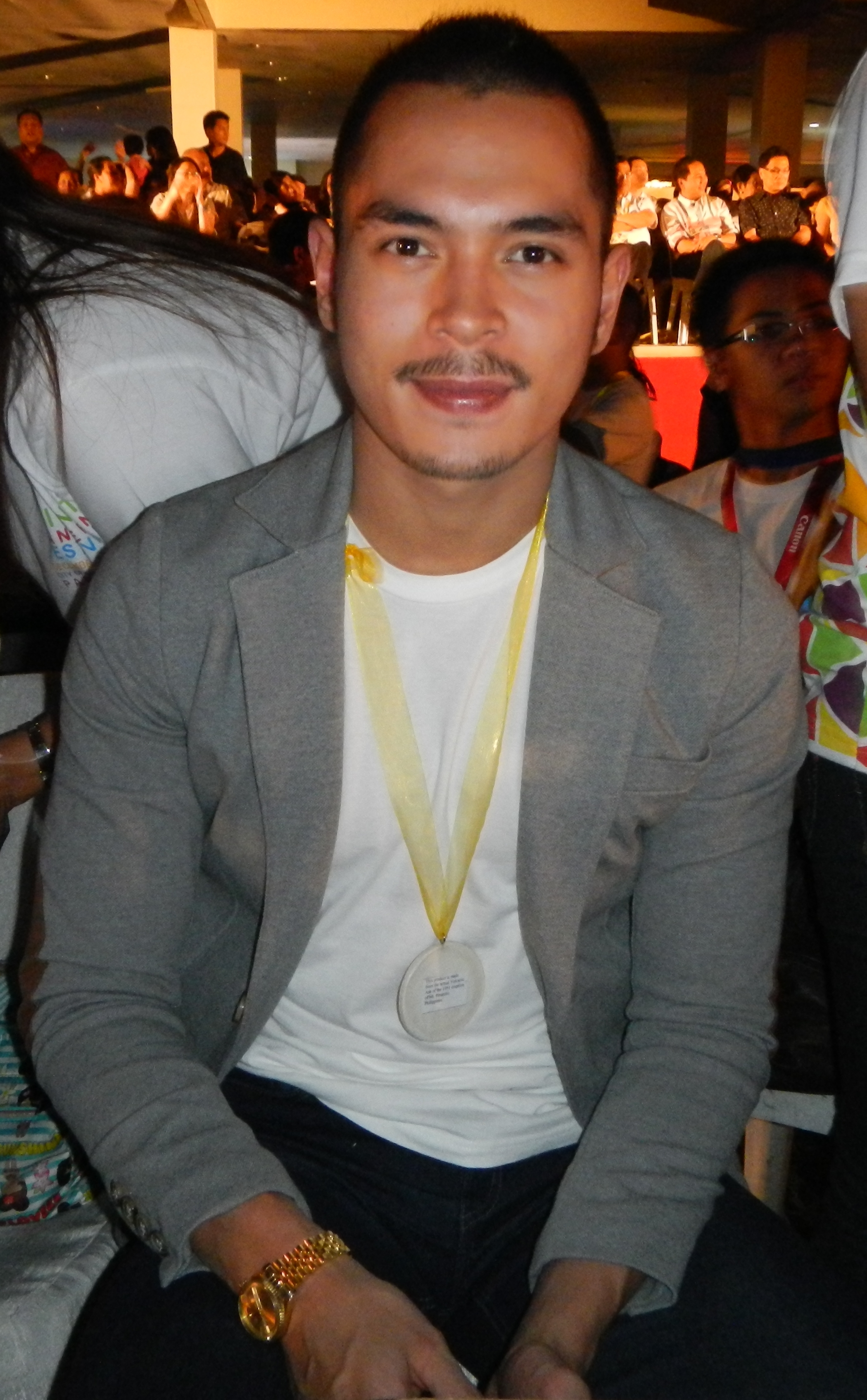
Jake Cuenca portrays Lt. David "Dave" M. Garcia, Jr.

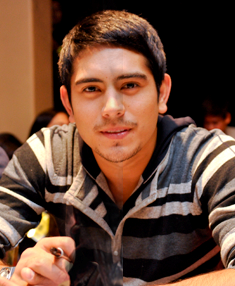
Gerald Anderson portrays Lt. David "JR" D. Garcia, Jr.

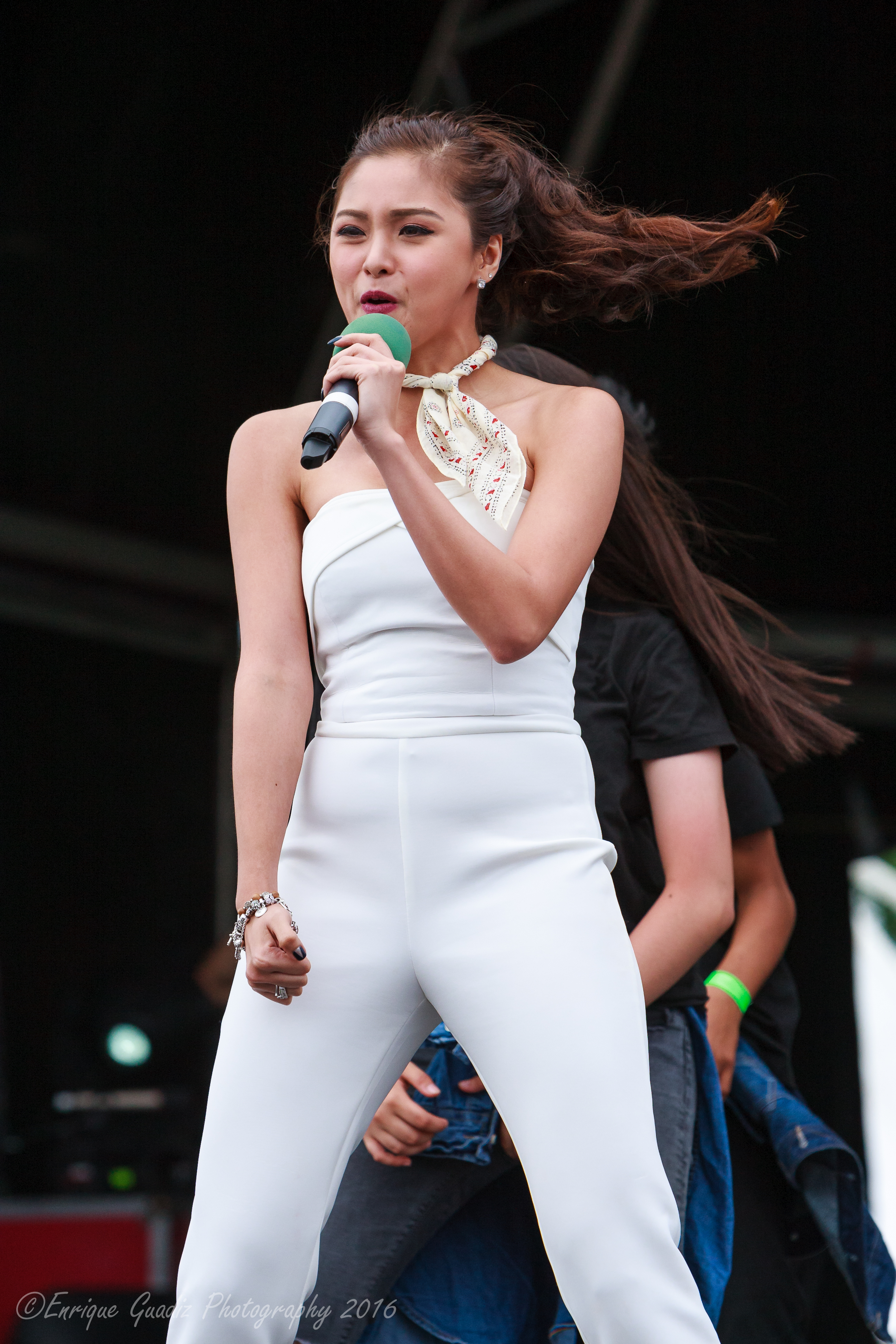
Kim Chiu portrays Audrey King-Garcia

=== Main cast ===
- Jake Cuenca as Lt. David "Dave" M. Garcia / David John D. Garcia
- Gerald Anderson as Lt. David "JR" D. Garcia
- Kim Chiu as Audrey D. King-Garcia

=== Supporting cast ===
- Gina Pareño as Rita "Lola Gets" Dionisio
- Cherry Pie Picache as Marlene Dionisio
- Agot Isidro as Ingrid Martinez-Garcia / Ingrid Martinez-Cardenas
- Mylene Dizon as Loreta Dominguez-King
- Alessandra De Rossi as Greta Romano
- Baron Geisler as Leo Cardenas
- Coco Martin as Ramon D. Lecumberri
- Jiro Manio as Stanley "Stan" D. King III
- Spanky Manikan as Stanley King Sr.
- Miguel Faustmann as Col. David Garcia Sr.
- Jodi Sta. Maria as Angela Dominguez
- Anita Linda as Lilian "Lily" King
- Helen Gamboa as Elizabeth "Mamita" Martinez

=== Recurring guest cast ===
- Johnny Revilla as Marlon "Hunyango" Cardenas
- Ping Medina as Nicolas "Nico" Valencia
- Regine Angeles as Olivia Mondigo
- Beauty Gonzalez as Dolores Ocampo
- Alex Anselmuccio as Lt. James Espiritu
- Neil Ryan Sese as Atty. Sandoval
- Kian Kazemi as Lt. Paul Isidro
- John Medina as 2nd Lt. Franco Walton
- Simon Ibarra as Manuel
- Gerard Pizzaras as Major Gonzales
- Cacai Bautista as Ula
- Mike Lloren as General Bernardo Rosario
- Ram Sagad as 1st Lt. Florentino (JR's immediate superior)
- Efren Reyes Jr. as Ka Duroy

=== Cameo appearances ===
- Celine Lim as young Audrey
- Francis Magundayao as young JR
- Carlo Lacana as young Dave
- Paul Salas as young Ramon
- Sharlene San Pedro as young Ingrid
- Cheska Billiones as young Marlene
- Desiree del Valle as young Rita
- Dimples Romana as young Elizabeth
- Rodjun Cruz as Stanley "Junior" King Jr.
- Irma Adlawan as Berta Romano (Greta's mother)
- Cacai Bautista as Ula
- John Apacible as Rex
- Gilbert Teodoro (former Philippine Defense Secretary) as himself
- Michael Conan as Pedring (Ka Duroy's second rebel commander)
- John James Uy as Edward de Castro
- Shamaine Centenera-Buencamino as Dionisio family attorney
- Jennifer Illustre as Ditas
- Paw Diaz as Michaela
- Robert Arevalo as Greg Martinez
- Richard Quan as Andrew Cheng
- John Manalo as Benong / Jomar
- Tanya Gomez as Janice
- Marc Acueza as Charles
- Gian Sotto as Paul (Hunyango's assistant and Ramon's ally)
- Dionne Monsanto as TV News Reporter
- Charles Christianson as Peter
- Bing Davao as Alias Black Hawk
- Dido de la Paz as Jail Supt. Fernandez
- Mike Magat as Jail Officer II Vivar
- Michael Roy Jornales as Bong
- Mon Confiado as Brando
- Richard Poon as himself (singer for wedding of JR & Audrey)
- Menggie Cobarrubias as Lola Gets's doctor
- Leo Rialp as Audrey's doctor
- Cheryl Ramos as Audrey's ob-gynecologist
- Archie Adamos as Brigadier General Villanueva
- Rosanna Roces as Emma Garcia (finale episode)
- Enchong Dee as David Anthony Garcia III (finale episode)
- Krista Valle as Bar girl (Greta's Friend of GRO)
- Auriette Divina as Audrey's classmate (uncredited)
- Roderick Lindayag
- Gigette Reyes
- Boy Roque
- Froilan Sales
- Melmar Magno as Ricky, Audrey's classmate (uncredited)
- Delia Razon

== Reception ==
=== Citation from the Armed Forces ===
The production team of Tayong Dalawa and its three leading actors were cited by the Armed Forces of the Philippines for promoting a positive image of the Philippine military. The show is also credited for boosting the Philippine Military Academy's recruitment of prospective cadets by 300%, with the show also advertising the academy's entrance examinations at the end of each episode. Many episodes were shot inside the PMA campus in Baguio, where Anderson and Cuenca underwent training alongside the actual cadets. Anderson lamented that his and Cuenca's lack of Citizen Army Training experience was an initial problem in adjusting to the academy's training regime.

== Soundtrack ==
The show's title theme music is "Tayong Dalawa" by Gary Valenciano, and certain scenes use "Bukas Na Lang Kita Mamahalin" ("I Will Love You Tomorrow") by Lani Misalucha. The song "Tayong Dalawa" was originally composed and performed by Rey Valera and also covered by Sharon Cuneta for the theme song of her film with same title, with former husband Gabby Concepcion. Released in 1992, it was their final movie, after their annulment.

== DVD release ==
In August 2009, an announcement was made that Tayong Dalawa will be available on DVD. All volumes have been released. There are 20 volumes on DVD for the whole series.

== Tayong Dalawa: The Untold Beginning (special episode) ==
On September 20, 2009, ABS-CBN aired Tayong Dalawa: The Untold Beginning. The made-for-TV movie features deleted scenes from the first few episodes of the series, which explores the origins of the rivalry between mother-daughter pairs Lola Gets-Marlene and Elizabeth-Ingrid. It also expounds on Ingrid and Marlene's separate love stories with David Garcia Sr.

== Awards ==
Year	Organization	Category	Result
2009	Catholic Mass Media Awards	Best Drama Series	Won
2009	ASAP Pop Viewer's Choice Awards	Pop Kapamilya TV Show	Won
2009	ASAP Pop Viewer's Choice Awards	Pop Theme Song (Tayong Dalawa by Gary Valenciano)	Won
2009	ASAP Pop Viewer's Choice Awards	Pop Song of the Year (Tayong Dalawa by Gary Valenciano)	Nominated
2009	ASAP Pop Viewer's Choice Awards	Pop TV Character of the Year (Coco Martin as Ramon)	Nominated
2009	ASAP Pop Viewer's Choice Awards	Pop TV Character of the Year (Gina Pareno as Lola Gets)	Nominated
2009	Star Awards for Television	Best Primetime Drama Series	Nominated
2009	Star Awards for Television	Best Actor in a Drama Series (Coco Martin)	Won
2009	Star Awards for Television	Best Actress in a Drama Series (Agot Isidro)	Nominated
2009	Star Awards for Television	Best Actress in a Drama Series (Gina Pareno)	Won
2010	8th Gawad Tanglaw Awards	Best Television Drama Series	Won
2010	8th Gawad Tanglaw Awards	Best Ensemble Performance in a Television Drama	Won
2010	8th Gawad Tanglaw Awards	Presidential Jury Award for Excellence in Acting (Coco Martin)	Won
2010	6th USTv Awards	Best Actress in a Daily Soap Opera (Kim Chiu)	Won
2010	6th USTv Awards	Best Actor in a Daily Soap Opera (Gerald Anderson)	Nominated
2010	6th USTv Awards	Best Daily Soap Opera	Nominated
2010	NSUU TV Awards	Best Performance by an Actor in a Series, Mini-series or TV Movie (Gerald Anderson)	Won
2010	NSUU TV Awards	Best Performance by an Actress in a Series, Mini-series or TV Movie (Kim Chiu)	Won
2010	Gandingan Awards	Best Drama Series	Won
2010	41st GMMSF Box-Office Entertainment Awards	Princess of Philippine Movies & TV (Kim Chiu)	Won
2010	41st GMMSF Box-Office Entertainment Awards	Prince of Philippine Movies & TV (Gerald Anderson)	Won

== International release ==
Country/Region	Network(s)	Series premiere	Series Title in Country
Indonesia	SUN TV	April 6, 2010	The Two Of Us
Malaysia	Astro Prima	April 6, 2010	The Two Of Us
Singapore	MediaCorp Channel 5	August 31, 2010	The Two Of Us
Uganda	NTV		The Two Of Us
Kenya	NTV	June 29, 2010	The Two Of Us
Cambodia	TV5 Cambodia		យើងទាំងពីរនាក់

== Remake and adaptations ==
A Malaysian productions and Astro Prima remake version this drama named Angkara Cinta starring by Hun Haqeem, Meerqeen and Wanna Ali between 2020 and 2021

== See also ==
- List of programs broadcast by ABS-CBN
- List of ABS-CBN Studios original drama series
