= List of Magpahanggang Wakas episodes =

Magpahanggang Wakas (Lit: Until the End / English title: I'll Never Say Goodbye) is a 2016 Philippine romantic melodrama television series directed by FM Reyes, starring Jericho Rosales, Arci Muñoz and John Estrada. The series aired from September 19, 2016 to January 6, 2017 on ABS-CBN's Primetime Bida evening block and worldwide on The Filipino Channel, replacing Born for You.

== Series overview ==
Season	Episodes	Originally released	
Season	Episodes	First released	Last released
1	80	September 19, 2016	January 6, 2017

== Episodes ==
No. overall	No. in season	Title	Original release date	Kantar Media Ratings (Nationwide)	AGB Nielsen Ratings (NUTAM)
1	1	"Hubad na Simula"	September 19, 2016	25.1%	17.2%
2	2	"Kabayaran"	September 20, 2016	26.8%	18.3%
3	3	"Paglaya"	September 21, 2016	26.5%	17.7%
4	4	"Alaala"	September 22, 2016	26.7%	17.4%
5	5	"Pagbabalik"	September 23, 2016	N/A	15.7%
6	6	"Pag-alok ng Kasal"	September 26, 2016	24.7%	16.4%
7	7	"Pagkikita"	September 27, 2016	25.6%	16.7%
8	8	"Umaasa"	September 28, 2016	23.6%	15.2%
9	9	"Obligasyon"	September 29, 2016	24.7%	17.6%
10	10	"Pagsisikap"	September 30, 2016	24.3%	15.0%
11	11	"Pagtatago"	October 3, 2016	23.1%	14.8%
12	12	"Suspetsa"	October 4, 2016	22.0%	12.7%
13	13	"Lihim"	October 5, 2016	23.8%	15.1%
14	14	"Sabuwatan"	October 6, 2016	22.5%	15.9%
15	15	"Pagbabanta"	October 7, 2016	22.5%	14.4%
16	16	"Katotohanan"	October 10, 2016	23.9%	14.9%
17	17	"Lantad"	October 11, 2016	23.5%	15.9%
18	18	"Komprontasyon"	October 12, 2016	22.7%	13.4%
19	19	"Tiwala"	October 13, 2016	25.4%	16.9%
20	20	"Pagpili"	October 14, 2016	22.6%	14.8%
21	21	"Sakripisyo"	October 17, 2016	25.5%	17.1%
22	22	"Pananabik"	October 18, 2016	24.0%	17.4%
23	23	"Paghahanap"	October 19, 2016	N/A	12.4%
24	24	"Pagpapaalam"	October 20, 2016	N/A	15.9%
25	25	"Pagbabago"	October 21, 2016	21.6%	16.0%
26	26	"Bagong Buhay"	October 24, 2016	24.2%	16.5%
27	27	"Paglimot"	October 25, 2016	24.7%	16.1%
28	28	"Maglalapit"	October 26, 2016	25.1%	16.9%
29	29	"Mananatili"	October 27, 2016	N/A	15.7%
30	30	"Pag-aalala"	October 28, 2016	22.6%	14.6%
31	31	"Pamilya"	October 31, 2016	22.2%	15.4%
32	32	"Masisilayan"	November 1, 2016	22.1%	14.0%
33	33	"Pagtanggap"	November 2, 2016	22.0%	15.2%
34	34	"Kabiguan"	November 3, 2016	23.2%	14.9%
35	35	"Tagumpay"	November 4, 2016	23.3%	15.1%
36	36	"Isang Pamilya Tayo"	November 7, 2016	23.2%	15.6%
37	37	"Ligtas"	November 8, 2016	22.2%	14.8%
38	38	"Ambisyon"	November 9, 2016	24.1%	15.0%
39	39	"Pagdikta"	November 10, 2016	24.0%	19.9%
40	40	"Pagtulong"	November 11, 2016	24.7%	14.7%
41	41	"Pagmamalupit"	November 14, 2016	N/A	15.2%
42	42	"Pananakit"	November 15, 2016	N/A	15.1%
43	43	"Senyales"	November 16, 2016	23.5%	14.6%
44	44	"Desisyon"	November 17, 2016	25.1%	15.1%
45	45	"Paglayo"	November 18, 2016	N/A	15.6%
46	46	"Imbestiga"	November 21, 2016	24.9%	16.0%
47	47	"Regalo"	November 22, 2016	N/A	15.7%
48	48	"Panganib"	November 23, 2016	26.7%	16.4%
49	49	"Paghaharap"	November 24, 2016	25.8%	16.2%
50	50	"Pagsubok"	November 25, 2016	23.5%	14.2%
51	51	"Pagdamay"	November 28, 2016	26.9%	17.7%
52	52	"Paalam, Anak"	November 29, 2016	27.5%	17.6%
53	53	"Pagbangon"	November 30, 2016	26.0%	17.8%
54	54	"Sabwatan"	December 1, 2016	26.7%	18.1%
55	55	"Hadlang"	December 2, 2016	24.5%	17.6%
56	56	"Pagtikim"	December 5, 2016	26.3%	17.3%
57	57	"Pruweba"	December 6, 2016	28.0%	18.7%
58	58	"Bintang"	December 7, 2016	27.2%	18.4%
59	59	"Bilanggo"	December 8, 2016	26.3%	18.4%
60	60	"Hustisya"	December 9, 2016	24.7%	17.6%
61	61	"Inosente"	December 12, 2016	25.3%	16.6%
62	62	"Pagkadawit"	December 13, 2016	26.4%	17.6%
63	63	"Karahasan"	December 14, 2016	26.3%	17.8%
64	64	"Huli"	December 15, 2016	29.0%	18.5%
65	65	"Hatol"	December 16, 2016	26.3%	16.3%
66	66	"Pagkabigo"	December 19, 2016	26.9%	16.6%
67	67	"Panunumbalik"	December 20, 2016	25.2%	16.1%
68	68	"Harana"	December 21, 2016	N/A	16.5%
69	69	"Desperado"	December 22, 2016	25.0%	15.6%
70	70	"Manipula"	December 23, 2016	23.5%	15.4%
71	71	"Pagdating"	December 26, 2016	22.9%	14.2%
72	72	"Pagduda"	December 27, 2016	22.3%	14.7%
73	73	"Asenso"	December 28, 2016	21.9%	15.0%
74	74	"Responsibilidad"	December 29, 2016	21.6%	15.9%
75	75	"Paghihiganti"	December 30, 2016	21.8%	15.4%
76	76	"Paglisan"	January 2, 2017	21.1%	16.1%
77	77	"Pananagutan"	January 3, 2017	23.4%	16.4%
78	78	"Patibong"	January 4, 2017	25.9%	18.6%
79	79	"Sukdulan"	January 5, 2017	28.2%	17.3%
80	80	"Mainit na Pagwawakas"	January 6, 2017	27.0%	18.0%
