= Extra Service =

- Official Theatrical Poster
- Directed by: Chris Martinez
- Written by: Alpha Habon
- Produced by: Charo Santos-Concio; Malou N. Santos
- Starring: Arci Muñoz; Coleen Garcia; Jessy Mendiola
- Cinematography: Mo Zee
- Edited by: Beng Bandong
- Music by: Carmina Cuya
- Production companies: Star Cinema; Skylight Films
- Distributed by: Star Cinema
- Release date: January 11, 2017
- Running time: 103 minutes
- Country: Philippines
- Language: Filipino
- Box office: ₱10 million

Extra Service is a 2017 Filipino action-comedy film starring Arci Muñoz, Jessy Mendiola and Coleen Garcia. The film was directed by Chris Martinez and produced by Skylight Films and Star Cinema.

The film marks the reunion of Arci and Coleen who were among the lead stars of Pasion de Amor, a Filipino version of Pasión de Gavilanes, aired on ABS-CBN.

The film also marks Enzo Pineda and Vin Abrenica's first Star Cinema movie upon their transfer to ABS-CBN.

The last film of Skylight Films before it ended its operations and the subsequent creation of Black Sheep Productions in 2018.

== Synopsis ==
The story revolves around the amazing adventures of Aw (Arci Muñoz), Em (Coleen Garcia) and Gee (Jessy Mendiola), who are mild-mannered massage therapists by day and fierce secret agents who solve crimes by night. They are then tasked to embark on a top-level secret mission to retrieve the precious “Perlas Ng Silangan” in exchange for their lives and freedom.

== Cast ==
=== Main ===
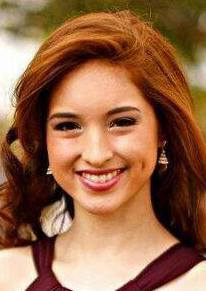
Coleen Garcia portrays Emerald/Maldita/Em

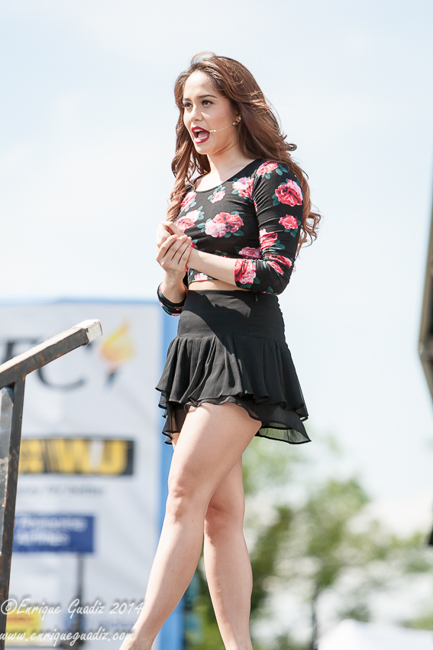
Jessy Mendiola portrays Genevieve/Henya/Gee

- Arci Muñoz as Aurora/Kapitana/Aw
- Coleen Garcia as Emerald/Maldita/Em
- Jessy Mendiola as Genevieve/Henya/Gee

=== Supporting ===
- Ejay Falcon as Moises
- Enzo Pineda as Larry
- Vin Abrenica as Carlo
- Jaime Fabregas as Don Jose Mondragon
- Arlene Muhlach as Doña Akira Susomo
- Carmi Martin as L
- Janus del Prado as Paquito Mondragon
- Kim Molina as Mari Susomo
- Kitkat as Beverly
- Tessie Tomas as Lolly
- Michelle Vito as Julia
- Elisse Joson as Julia
- Alexa Ilacad as Julia
