= Dawn Zulueta =

Filipino actress (born 1969)

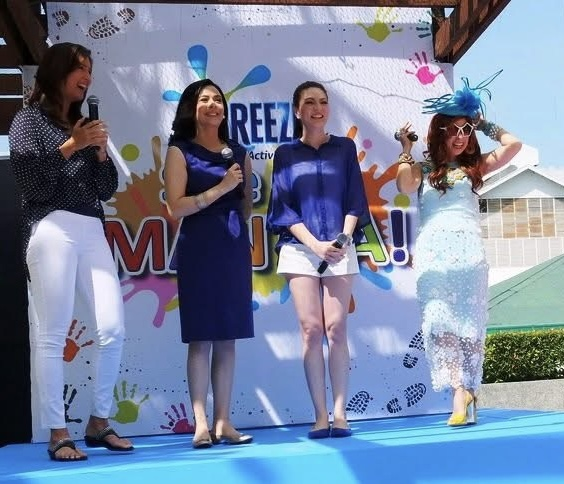
- Zulueta (third from the right) in 2013
- Born: Marie Rachel Salman Taleon; March 4, 1969 (age 57); Manila, Philippines
- Other name: Dawn Zulueta-Lagdameo
- Occupations: Actress; host
- Years active: 1986–present
- Agents: GMA Artist Center (1995–1997; 2004–2006; 2017; 2020) Viva Artists Agency (1986–2003); Asian Artists Agency (2006–present)
- Spouse: Antonio Lagdameo Jr. (m. 1997)
- Children: 2
- Relatives: Jed Madela (cousin)

Dawn Zulueta (Tagalog pronunciation: [sʊlˈwɛtɐ]; born Marie Rachel Salman Taleon-Lagdameo, March 4, 1969), is a Filipino actress. She was recognized as the only Filipino actor to win two different major accolades in acting categories in a single year when she won Best Actress and Best Supporting Actress in the 1992 FAMAS Awards. She also appeared in Manila Standard's Top 10 Filipina actresses of the 1990s list of 1999.

== Career ==
Zulueta was spotted in a Close-Up television commercial in 1986 opposite Tonton Gutierrez. She then started her film career in Nakagapos na Puso (1986) alongside Sharon Cuneta and Lorna Tolentino. She also had roles in television series like Okay Ka, Fairy Ko! (1995–1997) as the lead character's wife, drama series Davao (1990), and became a regular female co-host on the musical variety show GMA Supershow (1989).

She branched out hosting other musical-variety shows like The Dawn and Jimmy Show (1989) and RSVP (1990). During the early years of her career, she was cast in comedy films like Bondying (1988) starring Jimmy Santos, and Alyas Batman en Robin (1991) with Joey de Leon and Keempee de Leon. Zulueta's played the lead opposite Richard Gomez in the romantic drama Hihintayin Kita sa Langit (1991) playing ill-fated lovers.

Zulueta holds the distinction of winning both the FAMAS Awards for Best Lead Actress (Hihintayin Kita sa Langit) and Best Supporting Actress (Una Kang Naging Akin) in 1992, making her the only Filipino actor to ever to win two different major accolades in acting categories in a single year. She also won a Luna Award as Supporting Actress of the Year for the film Una Kang Naging Akin. In 1994, Zulueta received the Box Office Entertainment Award for Box Office Queen for the film The Maggie Dela Riva Story...God Why Me?

In 1993, Zulueta received two Best Actress awards from the Metro Manila Film Festival and FAMAS. In 1994, the Philippine Movie Press Club (PMPC) Star Awards for Movies for Buhay ng Buhay Ko. Further, she has received multiple nominations (for both lead and supporting roles) from the prestigious Manunuri ng Pelikulang Pilipino (MPP) Gawad Urian.

In 1996, Zulueta starred with Sheryl Cruz and Charlene Gonzales in the hit drama-vengeance film Ikaw Naman Ang Iiyak for Viva Films in a lead role as Elaine, which became a career booster as a lead actress. In the same year, Zulueta was cited in a Manila Times article as the 10th Best Filipino Actress from 1990 to 1996. In addition, a 1999 Manila Standard article named her as one of the Top 10 Actresses of the 1990s.

In 2010, Zulueta took the lead role in a stage musical, A Little Night Music. In 2011, she made a comeback television show the remake of Mula sa Puso, which she's plays Magda, who originally played by Jaclyn Jose.

In 2012, ABS-CBN launched Walang Hanggan which starred Zulueta, Gomez, Coco Martin, and Julia Montes. The show was noted to be a reboot of the Gomez-Zulueta film Hihintayin Kita Sa Langit.

She also portrayed the lead character's older version in the 2014 film, She's Dating the Gangster where she acted opposite Gomez, along with lead stars Kathryn Bernardo and Daniel Padilla. She then played another lead role in the drama The Love Affair in 2015 under the direction of Nuel C. Naval and a screenplay by Vanessa R. Valdez.

Opposite Gomez, Zulueta played Marian Fontanilla in the 2015–2016 soap opera, You're My Home. The show became her and Gomez's last collaboration up to date.

In 2016, Zulueta worked with Piolo Pascual and Coleen García in Love Me Tomorrow as directed by Gino M. Santos. Gomez also made a special appearance in the film. In the same year, Zulueta played as first lady Marissa Hidalgo in Ang Probinsyano. Her appearance on the show became a reunion project for her, and colleagues Martin, Edu Manzano, and Alice Dixson.

She played as Andrea Balatbat, a character opposite Vic Sotto's in the 2017 OctoArts movie, Meant to Beh.

Zulueta played the character of May Dela Cruz in the 2019 drama Family History.

== Personal life ==
She is of Palestinian descent. Her maternal grandfather, George Anton Salman, was a Palestinian-Arab who came to the Philippines after the Second World War.

She is married to Antonio Lagdameo, Jr. They have two children namely Jacobo Antonio (born 2005), and Ayisha Madlen (born 2009).

== Filmography ==
=== Film ===
Year	Title	Role
1986	Nakagapos Na Puso	Meldy
1988	One Day, Isang Araw	
1988	Paano Tatakasan ang Bukas	
1989	Mars Ravelo's Bondying: The Little Big Boy	Flora
1989	Bakit Iisa Lamang ang Puso	Diana
1989	Hindi Pahuhuli ng Buhay	Helena
1989	Isang Bala, Isang Buhay	Dolores
1990	Pangarap Na Ginto	Daisy
1990	Kasalanan Bang Sambahin Ka?	Grace
1991	Alyas Batman en Robin	Angelique Legarda / Wonder Woman
1991	Una Kang Naging Akin	Vanessa
1991	Hihintayin Kita sa Langit	Carmina Salvador
1991	Robin Good (Sugod ng sugod)	Lady Marian
1992	Iisa Pa Lamang	Clara
1992	Akin Ang Pangarap Mo	Alita
1992	Apoy sa Puso	
1992	Hanggang May Buhay	Kristie
1993	Saan Ka Man Naroroon	Amanda
1993	Paniwalaan Mo	Loren
1993	Kung Mawawala Ka Pa	Marisa
1994	Buhay ng Buhay Ko	
1994	Chinatown 2: The Vigilantes	
1994	The Cecilia Masagca Story: Antipolo Massacre (Jesus Save Us!)	Cecilia Masagca
1994	The Maggie Dela Riva Story (God ... Why Me?)	Maggie Dela Riva
1994	Sana'y Laging Magkapiling	Maria Makiling
1994	Lagalag: The Eddie Fernandez Story	Dulce Lukban
1994	Wanted Perfect Father	Lily
1995	Anabelle Huggins Story: Ruben Ablaza Tragedy – Mea Culpa	Annabelle Huggins
1995	Patayin Sa Sindak Si Barbara	Ruth Duarte
1996	Itataya Ko ang Buhay Ko	Andrea
1996	Lahar: Paraisong Abo	Sheila
1996	Bakit May Kahapon Pa?	Leah
1996	Ikaw Naman ang Iiyak	Elaine
1996	Salamat sa Lotto	
1997	To Saudi with Love	
2003	Filipinas	Gloria Filipinas
2008	Magkaibigan	Teresa
2010	Sigwa	Dolly
2011	Catch Me, I'm in Love	Elena Rodriguez
2012	Ang Nawawala	Esme Bonifacio
2014	She's Dating the Gangster	adult Athena Dizon
2015	The Love Affair	Patricia "Tricia" Ramos
2016	Love Me Tomorrow	Christy Domingo-Gonzales
2017	Meant to Beh	Andrea Balatbat
2019	Family History	May

=== Television / Digital series ===
Year	Title	Role
1988–1997	GMA Supershow	Herself/co-host
1989	The Dawn and Jimmy Show	Herself/host
1992	Davao: Ang Gintong Pag-Asa	
1994	Star Drama Theater Presents: Dawn	various roles
1996–1997	Okay Ka, Fairy Ko!	Faye
1997–2003; 2007–2016	ASAP	Co-Host/Performer
2001–2002	The Price Is Right	Herself/host
2004–2005	Forever in My Heart	Stella Carbonel
2005	Encantadia	Ynang Reyna Mine-a
2006	Encantadia: Pag-ibig Hanggang Wakas	Ynang Reyna Mine-a
2006	Now and Forever: Duyan	Adea
2007–2008	Mars Ravelo's Lastikman	Ruth Abelgas
2008	Maalaala Mo Kaya: Sulat	Malou
2009	Maalaala Mo Kaya: Tsinelas	Lina Simples
2011	Mula sa Puso	Magdalena "Magda" Trinidad-Pereira
2012	Walang Hanggan	Emilia "Emily" Cardenas-Guidotti
2012	Toda Max	SPO3 Emily Mapaginitan
2013	Binibining Pilipinas 2013	Herself/Main Host
2013	Minute to Win It	Herself/Celebrity Contestant
2013	Bukas na Lang Kita Mamahalin	Zenaida Dizon / Zenaida Ramirez
2014	Mars Ravelo's Dyesebel	Lucia Reyes
2015	Kapamilya, Deal or No Deal	Herself/Celebrity Player
2015–2016	You're My Home	Marian Angeles-Fontanilla
2016	Magandang Buhay	Herself
2017	The Lolas' Beautiful Show	Herself/Special guest
2017	Bossing & Ai	Herself/Special guest
2017	Eat Bulaga!	Herself
2017	Sunday PinaSaya	Herself
2018	FPJ's Ang Probinsyano	Marissa Hidalgo
2019	Pepito Manaloto	Elma
2022	A Family Affair	Carolina "Carol" Estrella

== Awards and nominations ==
Year	Award-Giving Body	Category	Work	Result
1990	FAMAS Awards	Best Actress	Bakit Iisa Lamang ang Puso	Nominated
1991	Gawad Urian Awards	Best Supporting Actress	Kasalanan Bang Sambahin Ka?	Nominated
1992	Gawad Urian Awards	Best Actress	Hihintayin Kita sa Langit	Nominated
1992	FAMAS Awards	Best Actress	Hihintayin Kita sa Langit	Won
1992	FAMAS Awards	Best Supporting Actress	Una Kang Naging Akin	Won
1992	Luna Awards	Best Supporting Actress	Una Kang Naging Akin	Won
1993	19th Metro Manila Film Festival	Best Festival Actress	Kung Mawawala Ka Pa	Won
1993	Gawad Urian Awards	Best Actress	Iisa Pa Lamang	Nominated
1993	FAMAS Awards	Best Actress	Iisa Pa Lamang	Nominated
1994	FAMAS Awards	Best Actress	Kung Mawawala Ka Pa	Won
1995	25th GMMSF Box-Office Entertainment Awards	Box-Office Queen	The Maggie Dela Riva Story	Won
1995	Star Awards for Movies	Actress of the Year	Buhay ng Buhay Ko	Won
1995	FAMAS Awards	Best Actress	The Cecilia Masagca Story: Antipolo Massacre (Jesus Save Us!)	Nominated
2009	Golden Screen Awards for Movies	Best Performance by an Actress in a Leading Role (Drama)	Magkaibigan	Nominated
2009	FAMAS Awards	Best Actress	Magkaibigan	Nominated
2010	24th PMPC Star Awards for TV	Best Single Performance by an Actress	Maalaala Mo Kaya: Tsinelas	Nominated
2011	Golden Screen Awards for Movies	Best Performance by an Actress in a Leading Role (Drama)	Sigwa	Nominated
2011	27th PMPC Star Awards for Movies	Movie Actress of the Year	Sigwa	Nominated
2011	ASAP Pop Viewers' Choice Awards	Pop Female Fashionista	Herself	Won
2012	26th PMPC Star Awards for TV	Best Drama Actress	Walang Hanggan	Nominated
2013	GMMSF Box-Office Entertainment Awards	All Time Favorite Love Team on Movies and TV (with Richard Gomez)	Walang Hanggan	Won
2013	Golden Screen TV Awards	Outstanding Performance by an Actress in a Drama Series	Walang Hanggan	Nominated
2014	28th PMPC Star Awards for TV	Best Drama Actress	Bukas na Lang Kita Mamahalin	Nominated
2015	63rd FAMAS Awards	Best Supporting Actress	She's Dating the Gangster	Nominated
2015	41st Metro Manila Film Festival	Best Actress	Meant to Beh	Nominated
2016	Gawad PASADO Awards	Pinakapasadong Aktres	The Love Affair	Won
2016	32nd PMPC Star Awards for Movies	Movie Actress of the Year	The Love Affair	Nominated
2016	FAMAS Awards	Best Actress	The Love Affair	Nominated
2016	30th PMPC Star Awards for TV	Best Drama Actress	You're My Home	Nominated
