= Ikaw Lang ang Iibigin =

2017–18 Philippine television drama series

- Title card
- Genre: Drama; Romance; Sports
- Created by: Rondel P. Lindayag; Keiko Aquino
- Developed by: ABS-CBN Studios
- Written by: Keiko Aquino; Clarissa Estuar; Emil Alfonso; Noreen Capili; Anton Pelon
- Directed by: Dan Villegas; Onat A. Diaz; Jerome C. Pobocan; Darnel Joy R. Villaflor; Jon S. Villarin
- Creative directors: Johnny de los Santos; Dang Baldonado
- Starring: Gerald Anderson; Kim Chiu; Jake Cuenca; Coleen Garcia
- Opening theme: "How Did You Know" by Daryl Ong
- Composers: Cecile Azarcon; Paulo Zarate; Jonathan Manalo
- Country of origin: Philippines
- Original language: Filipino
- No. of seasons: 3
- No. of episodes: 195

Production
- Executive producers: Jennifer Soliman-Bolalin; Jemila M. Jimenez
- Producer: Ethel M. Espiritu
- Production locations: Metro Manila, Philippines
- Editors: Rommel Malimban; Rizaldy Mora; Anika Cadavida; Maydelle Marical; Marlow Malvar
- Running time: 28–36 minutes
- Production company: Dreamscape Entertainment Television

Original release
- Network: ABS-CBN
- Release: May 1, 2017 – January 26, 2018

Ikaw Lang ang Iibigin (International title: Forever My Love / transl. you are the only one i will love) is a Philippine television drama series broadcast by ABS-CBN. Directed by Dan Villegas, Onat A. Diaz, Jerome C. Pobocan, Darnel Joy R. Villaflor and Jon S. Villarin, it stars Gerald Anderson, Kim Chiu, Jake Cuenca and Coleen Garcia. It aired on the network's Prime Tanghali line up and worldwide on TFC from May 1, 2017 to January 26, 2018, replacing Langit Lupa and was replaced by Sana Dalawa ang Puso. The triathlon drama marks KimErald's reunion project and TV comeback, and their first daytime drama.

== Plot ==
This fictional drama teleseries follows the story of Bianca Agbayani (Francine Diaz) and Gabriel Villoria (Yogo Singh) who develop a special bond as young children in Zambales. They part ways when Bianca's family move to Manila. Gabriel and his family relocate to Manila more than a decade later when he pursues his studies.

In Manila, Gabriel (Gerald Anderson) juggles work, studies, earns his business degree, and becomes a triathlete. Bianca (Kim Chiu) obtains her accounting certification and becomes a promising young athlete like her mother. Bianca is scouted by Tiger Shark Energy Drink president, Carlos dela Vega (Jake Cuenca) to be their new endorser. A chance encounter at a triathlon event organized by Tiger Shark reunites Bianca and Gabriel and they fall in love. Although everyone within their respective families are happy about Gabriel and Bianca's rekindled relationship, their love faces threats by secrets of the past.

Bianca's mother Maila Salcedo (Madeleine Humphries) was an Olympic triathlete, picked to represent her country at the ASEAN games. During a practice run at night, she is physically assaulted, resulting to permanent limb damage that ruins her career as a professional athlete. Her best friend Victoria Quintana (Bangs Garcia) takes her spot in the Philippine team and garners the honor and celebrity status that comes with this national achievement. No one suspects fellow Philippine team triathlete Rigor Villoria (Edgar Allan Guzman) as Maila's assailant, who commits the crime so that Victoria can take Maila's spot in the team. Rigor is a persistent suitor of Victoria, and gets his way with her with a one-night stand that results in a pregnancy.

Rigor is no match against another suitor: Roman dela Vega (TJ Trinidad), a handsome and wealthy businessman. After a two-year courtship, six months of which Roman spends away in Europe for business commitments, Victoria and Roman get married. Shortly before their marriage, Roman learns he has a son from a former liaison, Clara Rivera, who supposedly died from childbirth.

Roman does not suspect anything about Victoria as he was away in Europe for the majority of her pregnancy. Victoria delivers her son Gabriel just before Roman returns for their wedding and arranges to leave her son with Rigor. It was at this time when Roman's child surfaces and Victoria agreed to accept his son. Recognizing the opportunity to raise her son as a privileged and wealthy Dela Vega, Victoria and Rigor swap Roman's son with their own son.

Thus, the infant Gabriel assumes the identity of Roman's son, Carlos, and grows up in privilege and affluence. He is loved and overindulged by his mother, and a disappointment to his father who does not approve of his entitled ways.

Meanwhile, Rigor brings Roman's child Carlos to Zambales and gives him to his mother Lydia (Gina Pareño) to raise. Thus the infant Carlos assumes the identity of Rigor's son, Gabriel. In contrast to the other infant, Gabriel grows up in poverty, but is surrounded by a grandmother and an extended family who love, nurture, and support him.

To cover her complicity in the infant swaps, Victoria frames Rigor as a drug dealer, who is subsequently sent to prison on a life sentence. For the next two decades, Victoria's life is perfect: she has wealth, high social standing, a husband who loves her, and a son she dotes on. But Rigor (Daniel Fernando) is paroled from prison on a technicality and returns to Victoria (Ayen Munji-Laurel) for his rights to be close to her and their child. Her obvious anxieties over Rigor's sudden emergence into her life raises flags for Roman (Michael de Mesa) who suspects his wife of keeping secrets.

Rigor's return also strains the happy home Gabriel shares with his grandmother Lydia. Rigor openly despises Gabriel, who is disappointed over the cold reception he receives from his father. Rigor dislikes Bianca and purposely avoids rekindling a friendship with Maila (Bing Loyzaga), who is keen on catching up with her former teammate. Maila has no idea that the man who ended her career so abruptly is Rigor, the father of her daughter's suitor.

Roman and Victoria's world becomes even smaller when the former takes an interest in Tiger Shark. With no inkling that his actual son is just within his orbit, Roman decides to team up the popular sports couple as endorsers for Tiger Shark. Carlos is not happy with his father's interference in Tiger Shark and he considers Gabriel an intrusion in his life, particularly with his plans to court Bianca.

Still suspicious about his wife's past with Rigor, Roman investigates Victoria and learns of their previous relationship. Furious at her lies, he considers banishing her. Carlos is pained to see his mother suffer, but he discovers his true paternity. The significance of this new information terrifies him. Concerned over losing his wealth and status, Carlos seeks his father Rigor's help to protect his mother's secret and eliminate Gabriel from their lives.

Fighting off Rigor's advances, Victoria bounces off the rails of the hotel exit stairwell, falling several floors to her death. However, the suspicious death is blamed on Gabriel. Despite Carlos and Rigor's collusion implicating Gabriel with paid witnesses and manufactured evidence, Gabriel has a solid alibi to refute the charges and is cleared.

The worlds of the two men collide when Lydia discovers Gabriel's true paternity and admits the truth to Roman, who orders DNA tests for Carlos and Gabriel. The DNA results confirm Gabriel is Roman's real son and not Carlos. Roman proceeds to officially name Gabriel as his son, who now shares the same legal status as Carlos. Carlos is not pleased with recent developments and schemes with Rigor to bring down Gabriel. Roman suspects Rigor has direct knowledge about Victoria's death, Maila's debilitation, and with her kidnapping and subsequent fatal accident. Escalating conflicts between the brothers lead Roman to expel Carlos from the family and the company.

Roman grants Gabriel a management position in the company and Gabriel flourishes as a Dela Vega. Carlos, on the other hand, squanders his ₽100 million inheritance through gambling and his wife Isabel (Coleen Garcia) suffers a mid term miscarriage. He blames all his misfortunes on Gabriel and vows to destroy him.

Without access to the Dela Vega resources to pay his massive gambling debt, Carlos and Rigor strike a deal with a loan shark. They intercept an illegal courier carrying a large cache of smuggled diamonds belonging to an African syndicate. Carlos discovers the illegal stash, steals some of the diamonds and plants the leftover cache in Gabriel's car to implicate him with the syndicate. As expected the syndicate kidnaps Gabriel and attempt to kill him, but he escapes with the help of Sylvia (Isay Alvarez-Seña), a neighbor who had suspiciously been watching the syndicate as they followed Gabriel. Sylvia turns out to be Clara Rivera, Gabriel's birth mother, who had been secretly keeping an eye on him.

After recovering in hospital, where Gabriel's biological parents reconcile, Roman hides Gabriel and pretends that his son is missing and had been presumably killed by the syndicate. Suspicious that Carlos' sudden wealth has some connection with the syndicate, and using the resources of law enforcement assets, Gabriel obtains valuable intel exposing the loan shark and smuggling operations. In the meantime, a whistle blower admits to Roman about Carlos' direct involvement in the recent company sabotage and plans for a corporate takeover. There is enough evidence to convict Carlos and Rigor to keep them in jail for a long time.

Bianca and Gabriel's joy over the birth of their son changes to fear when their child is kidnapped. This time, Carlos and Rigor had nothing to do with it, since the former is confined in custody and the latter is fighting for his life from a gunshot wound. There is one other person left however, determined to hurt Bianca. Feigning another pregnancy, Isabel has been planning for a while to take revenge on Bianca by stealing her baby. Unfortunately for Isabel, her attempt to escape the country with Bianca's son is thwarted at the airport. Isabel is caught and placed in a mental facility.

At the prison hospital, Rigor calls his son one last time on the phone to say goodbye and makes peace with his mother Lydia. He passes away, having never apologized for his actions.

Accepting his mistakes towards Carlos when he was growing up, Roman visits Carlos in prison and asks for his forgiveness. He tells Carlos he will always be his father and promises to visit him every day. Overwhelmed with his father's declaration of love and validation he craved all his life, Carlos also asked his father to forgive him and wished he was his real father instead of Rigor.

Surrounded by all their loved ones, Gabriel and Bianca gather around the baptismal font during their son's christening, looking forward to a bright future.

== Cast and characters ==
=== Protagonist ===
- Kim Chiu as Bianca S. Agbayani-Dela Vega - Maila's daughter, Ben's granddaughter and Jay-Jay's older sister. She blames Carlos for her mother's death and Gabriel's disappearance.
- Gerald Anderson as Gabriel Q. Villoria / Gabriel R. Dela Vega - Rigor and Victoria's son who experiences his maltreatment from his father. He is Bianca's husband and Roman's biological son.

=== Antagonist ===
- Jake Cuenca as Carlos Q. Dela Vega / Carlos Q. Villoria - He is Roman's foster son and Rigor's biological son with Victoria and Lydia's biological grandson. He despises and destroys Gabriel's reputation for his misfortunes.
- Coleen Garcia as Isabel Reyes-Villoria - She is Sandra's older daughter and Steph's older half-sister who disapproves Jay-Jay and her sister being together. She is Carlos' wife who despises Bianca about her connection with her husband.

=== Lead ===
- Michael de Mesa as Roman Dela Vega - Carlos' foster father who blames his son for his mother's death. He is Gabriel's biological father. In the finale episode, he visits Carlos in prison for his shortcomings to forgive him.
- Daniel Fernando as Rigor Villoria - He is Gabriel's foster father who disapproves his son's friendship with Bianca. He is Carlos' biological father and Lydia's son. He is Victoria's former husband who was accused by Carlos of ending his mother's life. After kidnapping and taking Maila to his warehouse, he ended Maila's life. He died in the hospital after he bid goodbye to Carlos on the finale episode.

=== Main ===
- Gina Pareño as Lydia "Lola Ganda" Villoria - Rigor's mother and Gabriel's foster grandmother who defends her grandson from Rigor's maltreatment to his son. She experienced her resentment from Carlos.
- Dante Rivero as Ben Salcedo - Jay-Jay and Bianca's grandfather and Maila's father.

=== Supporting ===
- Isay Alvarez-Seña as Sylvia Macaraig / Clara Rivera
- Ana Marin as Natalia Rivera
- Andrea Brillantes as Stephanie "Steph" Chan
- Grae Fernandez as Joselito "Jay-Jay" S. Agbayani, Jr.
- Ana Roces as Sandra Chan

==== Recurring ====
- Via Antonio as Marilyn - Bianca's friend
- Nicco Manalo as Olsen - Gabriel's friend and employee.
- Juan Miguel Severo as Simeon - Carlos' childhood friend and employee at Tiger Shark.
- Ivan Carapiet as Derek
- Rolando Inocencio as Popoy
- Joel Saracho as Putot
- Dolly de Leon as Chuchay
- Ramon Christopher as Dr. Josh Reyes, Isabel's father
- Allan Garcia as Atty. Macalintal
- Giovanni Baldisseri as Roman Dela Vega's private investigator

=== Former ===
==== Main ====
- Arci Muñoz as Alexandra “Alex” F. Torres
- JC Santos as Percy Manicad

==== Supporting ====
- Ayen Munji-Laurel as Victoria Quintana-Dela Vega
- Bing Loyzaga as Maila Salcedo-Agbayani

Recurring

- Gerald Pizzaras as Coach Ambet
- Marina Benipayo as Anita

==== Guests ====
- Pinky Amador as Filomena Flores-Torres

==== Special participation ====
- Francine Diaz as young Bianca
- Yogo Singh as young Gabriel
- Luke Alford as young Carlos
- Madeleine Humphries as young Maila
- Bangs Garcia as young Victoria
- Edgar Allan Guzman as young Rigor
- TJ Trinidad as young Roman
- Ricardo Cepeda as young Ben
- Alex Castro as young Joey
- Icon Nourish as young Olsen
- Dominic Ochoa as Joey Agbayani

== Production ==
=== Development ===
The triathlon soap opera was first announced on April 27, 2016, with a tentative title Because You Love Me. It was supposed to be topbilled by Yen Santos, Gerald Anderson and Jake Cuenca. After the filming postponed for many reasons, Santos was later pulled out from the cast and moved to Magpahanggang Wakas, while some of the scenes already shot in Bulalacao, Oriental Mindoro will not be used anymore. Cuenca and Anderson remained part of the series, while ABS-CBN tapped Kim Chiu to play the role previously given to Santos. During a media announcement on October 24, 2016, Dreamscape revealed the project Ikaw Lang ang Iibigin and its cast, thus serving as Chiu and Anderson's reunion project. "Kimerald is Back" trended on Twitter for several hours after the announcement.

Filming for Ikaw Lang ang Iibigin began in October 26, 2016. The role of Lydia was originally to be portrayed by Helen Gamboa, but was replaced by her Tayong Dalawa co-star Gina Pareño.

=== Casting ===
The series marks the third collaboration between Kim Chiu, Gerald Anderson and Jake Cuenca as a love triangle. The three also reunites with Gina Pareño eight years after Tayong Dalawa, and Michael de Mesa ten years after Sana Maulit Muli. Meanwhile, the drama is also Cuenca's reunion and first on-screen team up with Coleen Garcia who he once worked with in the Philippine adaptation of the Colombian telenovela, Pasión de Amor.

On late September 2017, Arci Muñoz and JC Santos joined the cast as special guests for the drama's new chapter as third wheels for Chiu and Anderson. It was Muñoz's mini-reunion with Cuenca and Garcia.

=== Timeslot ===
Ikaw Lang ang Iibigin was originally confirmed to be part of Primetime Bida evening block, but was later on debunked by the management in favor of the return of Korean dramas on primetime such as Love in the Moonlight and Hwarang. In late April 2017, ABS-CBN announced the triathlon drama will replace Langit Lupa on May 1, 2017, in a pre-noontime slot right before It's Showtime, as part of PrimeTanghali noontime block. Many fans were very dismayed by the management decision afterwards.

=== Trivia ===
The secondary Dela Vega mansion and safe house where Bianca and Lydia go into hiding during the finale episodes was the same mansion used to film the home of the Abuevas in the previous Kim Chiu (Jasmine Estocapio) and Gerald Anderson (Julian Abueva) series My Girl (2008).

== Reception ==
=== Ratings ===
Kantar Media National TV Ratings (11:30AM PST)
Pilot Episode	Finale Episode	Peak	Average
17.0% May 1, 2017	22.6% January 26, 2018	22.6% January 26, 2018	TBD

=== Awards and nominations ===
Year	Awards Critics/ Association	Category	Recipient(s)/ Nominee	Result
2017	31st PMPC Star Awards for Television	Best Daytime Drama Series	Ikaw Lang ang Iibigin	Nominated
2017	31st PMPC Star Awards for Television	Best Drama Actor	Gerald Anderson	Nominated
2017	31st PMPC Star Awards for Television	Best Drama Actress	Kim Chiu	Nominated
2017	31st PMPC Star Awards for Television	Best Supporting Actor	Daniel Fernando	Won

== Soundtrack ==
The drama's main theme music is "How Did You Know" performed by Daryl Ong. A Tagalog cover version of the song entitled "Paano Mo Nalaman" is also performed by Maris Racal.

== See also ==
- List of programs broadcast by ABS-CBN
- List of ABS-CBN Studios original drama series
