= Magpahanggang Wakas =

2016–17 Philippine television drama series

- Title card
- Also known as: I'll Never Say Goodbye
- Genre: Drama; Romance; Revenge; Tragedy
- Created by: ABS-CBN Studios; Gina Marissa Tagasa
- Based on: Kastilyong Buhangin by Mario O'Hara
- Developed by: ABS-CBN Studios
- Written by: Genesis Rodriguez; Tanya Winona Bautista; Abigail Junia; Dickson Comia; Michael Transfiguracion; Christine Marie Gara; Bridgette Ann Rebuca
- Directed by: FM Reyes; Raymund B. Ocampo
- Starring: Jericho Rosales; Arci Muñoz; John Estrada
- Opening theme: "Magpahanggang Wakas" by Piolo Pascual with the ABS-CBN Philharmonic Orchestra
- Composer: Arnie Mendaros
- Country of origin: Philippines
- Original language: Filipino
- No. of episodes: 80 (list of episodes)

Production
- Executive producers: Carlo Katigbak; Cory Vidanes; Laurenti Dyogi; Ruel Bayani
- Producers: Narciso Y. Gulmatico, Jr. Mavic Holgado-Oducayen†
- Production locations: Manila, Philippines; Marinduque, Philippines; Caramoan, Camarines Sur, Philippines
- Cinematography: Romeo Vitug
- Editors: Kathryn Jerry Perez; Dennis Salgado
- Running time: 30–38 minutes
- Production company: RSB Drama Unit

Original release
- Network: ABS-CBN
- Release: September 19, 2016 – January 6, 2017

Related
- Kastilyong Buhangin (film)

Magpahanggang Wakas (International title: I'll Never Say Goodbye / transl. Until the End) is a Philippine television drama revenge series broadcast by ABS-CBN.The series is based on the 1980 Philippine film Kastilyong Buhangin. Directed by FM Reyes and Raymond B. Ocampo, it stars Jericho Rosales, Arci Muñoz and John Estrada. It aired on the network's Primetime Bida line up and worldwide on TFC from September 19, 2016 to January 6, 2017, replacing Born for You and was replaced by A Love to Last.

== Synopsis ==
Waldo del Mar shares a deep love with Aryann Castillo. Although both of them are young, their love for each other is undeniably genuine.

However, this changes when one night Waldo accidentally kills a man who'd attempted to rape Aryann. Waldo was convicted and was sent to prison. Feeling responsible for Waldo's misfortune, Aryann takes on different jobs to raise money to get him out of jail and meets Tristan, who helps her out.

Soon after being freed, Waldo faces the vengeful brother of the man he killed and was shot. He falls off a cliff. and drifts into the sea - everyone except Aryann believes him dead. After finally having accepted Waldo's death, Aryann moves on and is set to be wed to Tristan; matters are complicated when a still-alive Waldo crosses paths with Aryann.

== Cast and characters ==
=== Main cast ===
- Jericho Rosales as Engr. Ronualdo "Waldo" del Mar - King's brother, Kulas's son and Nenang's grandson.
- Arci Muñoz as Atty. Aryann Castillo - Rosing's niece.
- John Estrada as Tristan Lozado - Jenna's husband and Cheska's father.

=== Supporting cast ===
- Gelli de Belen as Jenna Celis-Lozado - Tristan's wife and Cheska's mother.
- Rita Avila as Rosita "Tyang Rosing" Natividad - Aryann's aunt.
- Lito Pimentel as Nicolas "Kulas" del Mar - Waldo and King's father and Nenang's son.
- Liza Lorena as Malena "Nenang" del Mar - Kulas's mother and Waldo and King's grandmother.
- Danita Paner as Leila Asuncion
- Maika Rivera as Cheska Lozado - Tristan and Jenna's daughter.
- Jomari Angeles as Enrique "King" del Mar - Waldo's youngest brother, Kulas's youngest son and Nenang's youngest grandson
- Marco Gumabao as Zachary "Zach" Flores - Simon's son.

=== Recurring cast ===
- Ronaldo Valdez as Antonio "Tony" Sandoval
- Yen Santos as Clarissa "Issa" Ordoñez - Dante's daughter.
- Cris Villanueva as Simon Flores - Zach's father.

=== Guest cast ===
- Allan Paule as Armand Natividad
- Justin Cuyugan as Domingo "Dodong" Natividad
- Eric Fructuoso as Tonio Rodriguez
- Maila Gumila as Atty. Angela Vidal
- David Chua as Nico Gomez
- Precious Lara Quigaman as Gina Meyers
- Jeric Raval as Dante Ordoñez - Issa's father.
- Jojit Lorenzo as Percival "Percy" Moreno
- Pinky Amador as Atty. Thea Galvez
- Jennica Garcia as Angel Faustino
- Manuel Chua as Kyle Faustino
- Yves Flores as Marlon Miranda
- Gilleth Sandico as Beth Miranda
- Valerie Concepcion as Cassandra Flores

== Reception ==
KANTAR MEDIA NATIONAL TV RATINGS (8:45PM PST)
PILOT EPISODE	FINALE EPISODE	PEAK	SOURCE
25.1%	27.0%	29.0% December 15, 2016	

== Production ==
=== Tentative title ===
The series was first announced on April 27, 2016 with a tentative title, Never Ever Say Goodbye. In August 2016, the drama's title was changed to Magpahanggang Wakas.

=== Casting ===
Magpahanggang Wakas marks the return of Jericho Rosales on primetime after his successful series Bridges of Love made waves in different Latin American countries, including Peru. Arci Muñoz returns in her second primetime series after her successful portrayal as Norma Elizondo in Pasión de Amor, a Philippine adaptation of Pasión de Gavilanes by Telemundo. It is also Rita Avila's comeback project on ABS-CBN four years after Walang Hanggan. Meanwhile, the melodrama is also Gelli de Belen and Danita Paner's first major primetime project since after leaving TV5.

=== Timeslot ===
Magpahanggang Wakas replaced Born for You on September 19, 2016 in an earlier timeslot at 8:45 pm after FPJ's Ang Probinsyano. ABS-CBN decided to move Till I Met You's timeslot at 9:30 pm.

== Re-runs ==
Magpahanggang Wakas aired re-runs on Jeepney TV from March 11, 2019 to May 3, 2019 (replacing the re-runs of Ikaw Lang ang Iibigin and was replaced by the re-runs of Sineserye Presents: Palimos ng Pag-ibig); and from June 22, 2020 to October 9, 2020 (replacing the re-runs of Princess and I and was replaced by the re-runs of Honesto).

It re-aired on Kapamilya Channel's Kapamilya Gold afternoon block, Kapamilya Online Live, and A2Z's Zuper Hapon from April 5, 2021 to July 23, 2021 (replacing the re-runs of The Good Son and was replaced by the re-runs of Nang Ngumiti ang Langit).

== See also ==
- List of programs broadcast by ABS-CBN
- List of ABS-CBN Studios original drama series
- List of programs broadcast by Jeepney TV
