= Love Me Tomorrow (film) =

- Theatrical movie poster
- Directed by: Gino M. Santos
- Produced by: Charo Santos-Concio; Malou N. Santos
- Starring: Piolo Pascual; Dawn Zulueta; Coleen Garcia
- Production company: ABS-CBN Film Productions, Inc.
- Distributed by: Star Cinema
- Release date: May 25, 2016
- Running time: 128 minutes
- Country: Philippines
- Languages: Filipino; English

Love Me Tomorrow is a 2016 Philippine romantic drama film starring Piolo Pascual, Dawn Zulueta and Coleen Garcia. It is directed by Gino M. Santos. It was released on May 25, 2016, and produced by Star Cinema.

== Cast ==
=== Main Cast ===
- Dawn Zulueta as Cristy Domingo-Gonzales
- Piolo Pascual as JC Santos
- Coleen Garcia as Janine Monteagudo

=== Supporting Cast ===
- Freddie Webb as Manuel Gonzales
- Carmi Martin as Angelina "Angie" Monteclaro
- Maxene Magalona as Jessica Gonzales
- Lui Villaruz as DJ Jorell
- RK Bagatsing as DJ Kiks
- Marco Gumabao as Carlos
- Ana Abad-Santos as Ditas
- Marnie Lapuz as Marichu
- Ruby Ruiz as Manang Elvie
- Francesca Floirendo as Chloe
- Barbie Imperial as Jerl
- Sam Thurman as DJ Nick
- Eva Ronda as Casey
- Mica Javier as Mara
- Ivan Carapiet as LA
- Loren Burgos as Veterinarian
- Mars Miranda as DJ 1
- Marc Marasigan as DJ 2
- Marc Naval as DJ 3

=== Special Participation ===
- Bea Alonzo as Patricia Morales (JC's new Girlfriend)
- Richard Gomez as Ethan Alvarez (Cristy's new acquaintance/airplane co-passenger)

== Music ==
The theme song "Will You Still Love Me Tomorrow" was originally sung by The Shirelles in 1961. In 2016, Juris covered the song as the movie title song. An EDM remix was done covered by KZ Tandingan.

== See also ==
- List of Filipino films in 2016
