= Last Fool Show =

2019 romantic comedy film by Eduardo Roy Jr.

- Theatrical release poster
- Directed by: Eduardo W. Roy Jr.
- Written by: Eduardo W. Roy Jr.
- Produced by: Carlo Katigbak; Olivia M. Lamasan
- Starring: Arci Muñoz; JM de Guzman
- Cinematography: Tey Clamor
- Edited by: Renard Torres
- Music by: Len Calvo
- Production companies: Emba Productions; N² Productions; ABS-CBN Film Productions
- Distributed by: Star Cinema
- Release dates: April 10, 2019 (Philippines); April 19, 2019 (United Arab Emirates)
- Running time: 110 minutes
- Country: Philippines
- Language: Filipino
- Box office: ₱1.8 million

Last Fool Show is a 2019 Filipino romantic comedy film written and directed by Eduardo Roy Jr. Filmed in Boracay and starring Arci Muñoz and JM de Guzman, the story follows an indie filmmaker who, after experienced box-office failures in her previous projects, was encouraged by the studio executive to create a commercialized romantic comedy film that parallels her own love life.

Produced by ABS-CBN Film Productions, Emba Productions, and N² Productions, the film was theatrically released in the Philippines on April 10, 2019, and in the United Arab Emirates on April 18.

== Plot ==
Mayessa is a filmmaker who has experienced success in the indie film industry. The movie starts with her pitching an indie film concept to a major mainstream movie company and Galaxy Films. However, Tess, the executive of Galaxy Films, was insisting that she let go of the indie concept for now and think of a movie idea that would be a hit with the masses, something in the line of a romcom. But she needed money to help her cancer stricken mother Sonya. Isa decides to do a rom com based on her own failed love story with him

== Cast ==
- Arci Muñoz as Mayessa Dominguez
- JM de Guzman as Paolo
- Snooky Serna as Sonya
- Bibeth Orteza as Tess Ranido
- Arlene Muhlach as Julie
- Gina Alajar as Joanna Lee
- Menggie Cobarrubias as Mr. Estrella
- Josef Elizalde as Fonzy
- Cholo Barretto as Hobi
- Patrick Sugui as himself
- Erin Ocampo as Jane
- Victor Silayan as Rocky
- Kris Tiffany Janson as herself
- Chamyto Aguedan as Oslec
- VJ Mendoza as Erwin
- Via Antonio as Zen
- Alora Sasam as Gema
- Joanna Marie Katanyag as herself
