= Ronnie Liang =

Filipino singer, actor, pilot, and Army Reservist officer

- Born: Ronnie de Guzman Liang; Angeles City, Pampanga, Philippines
- Genre: Ballad
- Occupations: Singer, performer, actor, model, pilot, army reservist officer
- Years active: 2006–present
- Labels: Universal, Viva
- Website: ronnieliang
- Military career
- Allegiance: Philippines
- Branch: Philippine Army; Army Reserve Command
- Service years: 2019 – present
- Rank: First Lieutenant

Ronnie de Guzman Liang is a Filipino singer, actor, model, influencer, Licensed Pilot, Army Reservist Officer.

== Early life ==
Liang is the youngest of seven children from a low-income family. He worked at a fast-food restaurant and a video store while attending Holy Angel University in his hometown of Angeles, Pampanga. He earned a BS in education with majors in physics, chemistry, and biology.

== Music career ==
Liang worked part-time as a ramp model, until his manager encouraged him to enter singing contests, including Pinoy Pop Superstar.

Liang then joined Pinoy Dream Academy and made it past the initial screening as one of the 20 to study within the academy. After a few months, he made it to the Honor's List of Six and ended up as the season's second runner-up.

He sang the popular OPM hit "Ngiti" and was once a mainstay of ABS-CBN's Sunday variety show ASAP. He also served as one of the "JukeBosses"/Judges of TV5's Sing Galing!.

Liang now is being managed by Viva Artist Agency.

== Other activities ==
Liang is also an Army Reservist and a licensed private pilot. In 2019, he completed training at APG International Aviation Academy, and finished his ceremonial first solo flight. In 2021, he earned his Private Pilot License. Liang also completed his commercial pilot and instructor training at the Pilipinas Space and Aviation Academy Incorporated.

In March 2022, Liang was promoted Philippine Army first lieutenant, having been a Philippine Army Reserve Command reservist since 2020.

In August 2022, Liang earned his Master's degree Management, Major in National Security and Administration from the Philippine Christian University. He also earned his PH.D in Development Administration with Major in Security Development at Philippine Christian University March 2025.

In 2022, Liang founded the Ronnie Liang Project Ngiti Foundation Inc. with the aim of providing assistance to people, particularly children with cleft lip and cleft palate.

== Filmography ==
=== Film ===
Year	Title	Role
2005	Ako Legal Wife	Drake
2014	Esoterika Maynila	Mario
2015	Felix Manalo	Ben Santiago
2017	Fan Girl Fan Boy	Mr. Gun
2017	100 Tula Para Kay Stella	Edmond
2018	Petmalu	Max's brother
2018	Abay Babes	Brent
2018	Maria	Club Manager
2019	#Jowable	Charles
2021	Kaka	Himself

=== Television ===
Year	Title	Role
2005	Pinoy Pop Superstar	Himself / Finalist / Disqualified
2006	Pinoy Dream Academy	Himself / Second Runner-up
2007–2010	ASAP	Himself / Performer
2007	Your Song: Salamat	
2008–2009	I Love Betty La Fea	Enrique
2009	Wowowee	Himself / Performer
2010–2013	Party Pilipinas	Himself / Performer
2015	From the Beautiful Country	
2016	Just Duet	Himself / Performer
2016	Ang Kasambahay	
2019	Ghost Adventures	
2020	Wowowin	Himself / Performer
2021	Sing Galing!	Himself / Judge
2024	Abot-Kamay na Pangarap	Dr. Maniago
2024	Pulang Araw	Marking Agustin
2025	Binibining Marikit	Voltaire
2025	Akusada	Damian

== Discography ==
=== Solo albums ===
No.	Album information
1	Ronnie Liang: Ang Aking Awitin: Release: April 2007; Released by: Universal Records; Certification: Gold; Tracks: 1. Ngiti; 2. Sa 'Yo Lang; 3. Ikaw; 4. Gusto Kita; 5. Saan Darating Ang Umaga; 6. Kaibigan Mo; 7. Nais Ko; 8. Minsan; 9. Ang Aking Awitin (feat. Nikki Gil); 10. Nag-iisang Ikaw; 11. Kung Ako'y Uuwi; 12. Walang Iba; 13. Ngiti (Acoustic Version); 14. Ngiti (Minus One)
2	Ronnie Liang Released 2007 Released by Universal Records: 1. Ngiti; 2. Gusto Kita; 3. Ang Aking Awitin; 4. Ikaw; 5. Ayli- Pampanga version of Ngiti; 6. Ika- Pampanga version of Ikaw; 7. Ngiti instrumental
3	Ronnie Liang: May Minamahal: Release: July 2013; Released by: Viva Records; Tracks: 1. Akala Mo; 2. May Minamahal; 3. Mangarap Ka; 4. Beginning Today; 5. Kaputol Ng Isang Awit minus one
4	Ronnie Liang Songs of Love -Released 2014 -Released by Universal Records: 1. Liwanag; 2. Ngayon Lamang; 3. Hiling; 4. She's Always A Woman; 5. Nothing Can Stop Us Now; 6. Dance with my Father; 7. Looking Through the Eyes of Love; 8. Unchained Melody; 9. Ngiti; 10. Minus one (bonus tracks)
5	Ronnie Liang 12 -Released 2018 -Released by Viva Records: 1. Tila; 2. Ligaya; 3. Yakap; 4. Sa'yo Nalang Ako; 5. Pakisabi nalang 6. Minus one (bonus tracks)

=== Singles ===
Year	Title	Peak (Radio Stations)
2007	"Ngiti"	1
2007	"Gusto Kita"	1
2008	"Ikaw"	-
2013	"Akala Mo"	-
2016	"'Di Mo Man Sabihin"	
2016	"Pakisabi na Lang"	
2016	"Miss Kita Kung Christmas"	
2017	"Iingatan Ka"	
2019	"Ligaya"	1
2019	"Yakap"	3
2019	"Sa Paskong Darating"	
2019	"Liwanag" (Ronnie Liang/Sarah Geronimo)	
2023	"Kailangan Kong Gawin" (Ronnie Liang)	

== Concerts ==
- PDA Top 6 Dream Concert Tour: January 2007
- PDA Top 6 Dream Concert World Tour: April 2007
- US Tour: July – August 2007
- "Triple Dare Music" – September 27 at the Music Museum
- LoveXRomance – November 8, 2019 at the Music Museum | Special Guests: Sarah Geronimo, Ella Cruz and Janine Teñoso
- LoveXRomance-Dinner for a Cause - February 11, 2023 at Solano Hotel in Lipa, Batangas | Special Guests: Queenay, Carmela Lorzano and Janette Mamino

== Awards and nominations ==
Year	Award giving body	Category	Nominated work	Results
2007	ASAP Pop Viewer's Choice Awards	Pop Male Performance on a Music Video of the Year	"Gusto Kita"	Won
2007	ASAP Pop Viewer's Choice Awards	Pop Song of the Year	"Ngiti"	Won
2007	PMPC Star Awards for Television	Best New Male TV Personality	ASAP '07	Won
2008	Awit Awards	Best Performance by a Duet	"Ang Aking Awitin" with Nikki Gil	Nominated
2016	Gawad Pasado	Best Actor	Esoterika Manila	Won
2019	PMPC Star Awards for Music	Male Recording Artist of the Year	"Ligaya"	Nominated
2022	Gold Record Award	1st Debut Album	"Ang Aking Awitin(My Songs)"	April 2008
2022	Gold Record award	2nd album	MAY MINAMAHAL (Loving Someone)	under viva records (November 2013)
2022	Military Service Awards	Meritorious Achievement Medal (MAM), Military Merit Medal (2x), Military Commendation Medal, Disaster Achievement Relief & Rehabilitation, Operation (DRO) Ribbon and Presidential Unit Citation Badge		
2022	Asia's Pinnacle Awards	Asia's Most Phenomenal& Influential Singinging Icon of All Time		
2023	Gawad Filipino	Hero of the Year 2023		
2023	Asia's Modern Hero	Heroes Remarkable Star Icon & Singer of All Time		

• Meritorious Achievement Medal (MAM) • Military Merit Medal (2x) • Military Commendation Medal • Disaster Achievement Relief & Rehabilitation • Operation (DRO) Ribbon. • Presidential Unit Citation Badge • Hero of the Year 2023- Gawad Filipino • Heroes Remarkable Star Icon & Singer of All Time-Asia's Modern Hero 2023 • Asia's Most Phenomenal and Influential Singing Icon of All Time - Asia's Pinnacle Awards 2022 • Asia's Influential and Renowned Model and Singer for Entertainment Industry (Asia's Influential Leader Awards 2024)

== See also ==
- Pinoy Dream Academy
- ABS-CBN
