= Coleen Garcia =

Filipino actress (born 1992)

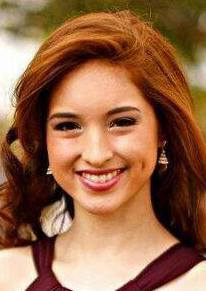
- Garcia in 2013
- Born: Danielle Claudine Ortega Garcia; September 24, 1992 (age 34); Mandaluyong, Metro Manila, Philippines
- Occupations: Actress; host; model; singer
- Years active: 2011–present
- Agent(s): ABS-CBN (2011–present); Star Magic (2011–2019); Viva Artists Agency (2019–present)
- Spouse: Billy Crawford (m. 2018)
- Children: 2
- Relatives: Arjo Atayde (cousin); Ria Atayde (cousin); Caloy Garcia (uncle)

Danielle Claudine "Coleen" Ortega Garcia-Crawford (born September 24, 1992) is a Filipino actress. Garcia began her career as a child and teenager appearing in several commercials. She eventually signed by Star Magic, where she has starred in several television series and films produced by ABS-CBN. From 2012 to 2016, she co-hosted the channel's noontime variety show It's Showtime, which she had left to focus solely on her acting career. Garcia's lead roles include the films Ex with Benefits (2015), Love Me Tomorrow (2016), and Sin Island (2018), as well as the teleseryes Pasión de Amor (2015–2016) and Ikaw Lang ang Iibigin (2017–2018).

== Early life ==
Garcia was born in Mandaluyong to a Spanish Filipino father, Jose Luis García, and Filipino mother, Maria Paz Ortega. Her paternal family is based in Barcelona. Garcia studied at the Southville International School and Colleges for secondary and tertiary education, taking up psychology through blended learning. Garcia is a third cousin of actor Arjo Atayde and actress Ria Atayde.

== Career ==
=== Early beginnings ===
Garcia began her career in the entertainment industry at an early age, making her debut as a commercial model at the age of 2 in a Johnson & Johnson advertisement alongside her mother. By the age of nine, she became an image model for Just G, the teens' line for Gingersnaps. During the period from 2009 to 2011, Garcia, as a teenager, featured in numerous commercial endorsements. Some notable advertisements from this period include Skin White with John Lloyd Cruz, Lewis & Pearl cologne with Enrique Gil, and Nestea alongside Neil Coleta as Matina.

=== 2011–present: Breakthrough ===
Garcia has been under contract with ABS-CBN's Star Magic group of talents since 2011. She first appeared in the episode "School I.D." of the anthology series Maalaala Mo Kaya, and was cast alongside ex-Lewis & Pearl partner Enrique Gil and former Pinoy Big Brother: Teen Clash 2010 contestants James Reid, Devon Seron, Fretzie Bercede and Yen Santos in a teen-oriented show Good Vibes. She also made appearances in other ABS-CBN shows and teleseryes such as My Binondo Girl, Wansapanataym, Oka Tokat, Little Champ, among others. In 2012, Garcia became a co-host for the noontime variety show It's Showtime. In 2013, she starred in her first feature film, She's the One.

In 2014, Garcia was cast in a supporting role in the Gino M. Santos-directed independent film #Y. She played an extroverted adolescent named Janna, for which being part of the cast garnered her a Best Cast Ensemble citation at the 10th Cinemalaya Independent Film Festival.

In June 2015, Garcia joined the main cast of the teleserye Pasión de Amor, an adaptation of the 2003 Colombian telenovela Pasión de Gavilanes, starring alongside Jake Cuenca, Arci Muñoz, Ejay Falcon, Ellen Adarna, and Joseph Marco. The series ran for almost nine months, ending in February 2016. In September, Garcia earned her first lead role in a feature film in the erotic film Ex with Benefits, reuniting with Santos and starring opposite Derek Ramsay. While it was a box office success, the film received criticism from the medical community for misrepresentation of the profession, where Garcia plays a medical representative. Garcia responded that her role was more focused on highlighting "her individual flaws" rather than being a generalization of the profession.

In January 2016, she announced that she had departed It's Showtime to prioritize her acting career. Later that year, she starred in an episode of Maalaala Mo Kaya entitled "Kadena". Her role as a mentally ill teenager was praised by critics and audiences for her portrayal of the character's several mental illnesses as a result of alcoholism and drug abuse, including auditory hallucination, antisocial personality disorder, and epilepsy. Garcia's performance in Maalaala Mo Kaya earned her the Best Actress award at the Hiyas ng Sining Awards organized by the Guild of Educators, Mentors, and Students. In 2017, Garcia starred in the action-comedy film Extra Service, alongside Jessy Mendiola and her Pasión de Amor co-star Arci Muñoz. From May 2017 to January 2018, she starred as Isabel Reyes in Ikaw Lang ang Iibigin, reuniting with Cuenca.

Garcia collaborated with Santos for another erotic film, Sin Island, in 2018, with Xian Lim as her on-screen partner. In an interview, she revealed that she suffered a face injury during filming that was accidentally inflicted upon by her co-star Nathalie Hart.

She appeared in the 2020 romantic comedy film Mia, playing the titular lead role of a doctor who resorted to alcoholism after the death of her fiancé.

Garcia starred alongside Diego Loyzaga in the film Isang Gabi (2024). Ricky Lee and Mac Alejandre wrote and directed the film, respectively.

== Personal life ==
Garcia dated her Good Vibes co-star Enrique Gil from 2010 to 2011.

In 2014, Garcia began dating her It's Showtime co-host, Billy Crawford. The two became engaged on December 20, 2016, and married on April 20, 2018. Her cousin Ria Atayde served as her maid of honor during the wedding. On May 1, 2020, Garcia and Crawford announced on Instagram that they were expecting their first child. Their first son, Amari, was born in September 10, 2020 via water birth.

In October 2020, Garcia's half-sister through her father was born, nearly a month after the birth of her own son.

On December 20, 2023, Garcia's step-aunt was fatally stabbed at her father's residence in Antipolo.

On April 13, 2025, Garcia and Crawford announced on Instagram that they were expecting their second child. Their second son, Austin, was born in August 2025, also via water birth.

== Filmography ==
=== Film ===
Year	Title	Role	Notes
2011	Oh! Pa Ra Sa Ta U Wa Yeah!	Matima	Short film
2013	She's the One	Mandy	
2014	#Y	Janna	
2015	Ex with Benefits	Arkisha Aragon	Main role
2016	Love Me Tomorrow	Janine Monteagudo	Main role
2017	Extra Service	Emerald/Maldita	Main role
2018	Sin Island	Kanika Santiago	Main role
2018	Exes Baggage	Dwein	Supporting role
2020	Mia	Mia Salazar	
2022	Adarna Gang	Adriana	
2022	Kaluskos		
2024	Playtime	Veronica	Main role
2024	Friendly Fire	Sonya	Main role

=== Television ===
Year	Title	Role	Notes
2011	Maalaala Mo Kaya	Bobit's girlfriend	Episode: "School I.D."
2011	Good Vibes	Monique Castillejo	Main role
2011–2012	My Binondo Girl	Marissa	
2012–2016	It's Showtime	Herself	Co-host
2012	Oka2Kat	Maria	
2013–present	ASAP XP	Herself	Co-host / Performer
2013	Little Champ	Alice	Main role
2015–2016	Pasión de Amor	Jimena "Jamie" Elizondo-Samonte†	Main role
2016	Maalaala Mo Kaya	Pauleen	Episode: "Kadena"
2016	Maalaala Mo Kaya	Rina	Episode: "Medical Result"
2017–2018	Ikaw Lang ang Iibigin	Isabel Reyes-Villoria	Antagonist Main role
2018	Maalaala Mo Kaya	Remy	Episode: "Burger Stand"
2026	Love, Siargao	Allie	Guest role

== Awards and nominations ==
Year	Body	Award/recognition	Work	Result	Ref.
2012	Yahoo! OMG Awards	Best Female Newcomer	Good Vibes	Nominated	
2015	PMPC Star Awards for Movies	New Movie Actress of the Year	#Y	Nominated	
2015	Candy Magazine	The Winning Squad – July 2015 cover issue	—N/a	Won	
2015	FHM Philippines	100 Sexiest Women	—N/a	Ranked 12	
2017	Guild of Educators, Mentors and Students Awards	Best Actress	Maalaala Mo Kaya (episode: "Kadena")	Won	
2022	El Grito International Fantastic Film Festival	Best Actress	Kaluskos		
