= Siphayo =

- Theatrical release poster
- English: Dismay
- Directed by: Joel Lamangan
- Screenplay by: Eric Ramos
- Story by: Joel Lamangan; Eric Ramos
- Produced by: Baby F. Go
- Starring: Luis Alandy; Joem Bascon; Nathalie Hart
- Cinematography: Rain Yamson
- Edited by: Vanessa de Leon
- Music by: Emerzon Texon
- Production company: BG Productions International
- Release date: 5 October 2016
- Running time: 90 minutes
- Country: Philippines
- Language: Filipino

Siphayo (English: Dismay) is a 2016 Philippine erotic thriller independent film directed by Joel Lamangan, and starring Luis Alandy, Joem Bascon, and Nathalie Hart.

== Cast ==
- Luis Alandy as Conrado
- Joem Bascon as Rolando
- Nathalie Hart as Alice
- Allan Paule as Dante
- Maria Isabel Lopez as Fely
- Elora Españo as Sol

== Production ==
=== Pre-production ===
According to director Joel Lamangan, Nathalie Hart was initially hesitant for the lead role when told that she is required to do full-frontal nudity for the film, but said that "she did not have second thoughts doing it (...) It was a project she simply could not pass up."

Hart had to be on a diet and workout in preparation for the role. She claimed that her recent breast enlargement surgery was crucial for the film.

=== Filming ===
During principal photography, Hart said that the first scenes they had to film were those that required her to do nudity, particularly a shower scene where her bare back is revealed. The following day, after filming a sex scene with co-star Luis Alandy, she said she "went in the bathroom and cried", and almost prompted to abandon the project as she felt she was doing pornography. Lamangan then reassured her that he is a "proper director" and he does not do porn. But despite being distraught having to do the scenes, Hart chose to remain involved in the project.

Joem Bascon confirmed in a separate interview that Hart performed her nude scenes genuinely and without the use of nipple tapes.

Filming concluded in early April 2016.

== Release ==
Siphayo is produced by producer Baby Go's production company BG Productions International. Although the film's original release date was on 5 October 2016, it was pushed the following day; a red carpet premiere was held at SM Megamall on 3 October.

The film premiered in the 2016 International Film Festival Manhattan in New York City on 22 October.

== Accolades ==
Awards
Year	Award	Category	Recipient(s)	Outcome	Source
2016	International Film Festival Manhattan: Film Festival Director Award	Best Actress	Nathalie Hart	Won	
