= Kasalanan Bang Sambahin Ka? =

1990 erotic thriller melodrama film by Chito S. Roño

- Official movie poster
- Directed by: Chito S. Roño
- Screenplay by: Jose Javier Reyes; Raquel Villavicencio
- Story by: Jose Javier Reyes
- Produced by: Vic R. Del Rosario Jr.; William C. Leary
- Starring: Dawn Zulueta; Julio Diaz; Vivian Velez
- Cinematography: Jun Pereira
- Edited by: Joe Solo
- Music by: Willy Cruz
- Production company: Viva Films
- Distributed by: Viva Films
- Release date: 11 July 1990
- Running time: 115 minutes
- Country: Philippines
- Language: Filipino

Kasalanan Bang Sambahin Ka? (transl. Is It a Sin to Worship You?) is a 1990 Philippine erotic psychological thriller melodrama film directed by Chito S. Roño from a story and screenplay written by Jose Javier Reyes, with additional screenplay inputs by Raquel Villavicencio. With a plot reminiscent of Adrian Lyne's 1987 film Fatal Attraction, the film stars Dawn Zulueta, Julio Diaz, and Vivian Velez, along with a supporting cast that includes Angie Ferro, Chanda Romero, Orestes Ojeda, and Joel Lamangan.

Produced and distributed by Viva Films, the film was theatrically released on 11 July 1990.

== Plot ==
Before the wedding to his fiancée Grace Lozano, real estate developer Alex Katigbak made a one-night stand with stockbroker Catherine Posadas. However, things would get worse when Catherine, who wanted him to take their relationship to the next level, took violent turns in destroying the lives and relationships of both Grace and Alex by various means, including stalking and giving stuff that was deemed a threat to them.

== Cast ==
- Dawn Zulueta as Grace Lozano: Alex's fiancée-later-wife who owns a gym where she teaches aerobics
- Julio Diaz as Alex Katigbak: A real estate developer and Grace's fiancé-later-husband
- Vivian Velez as Catherine Posadas: A stockbroker who, after having an affair with Alex, began stalking him
- Tita Muñoz as Elvira Katigbak
- Angie Ferro as Emma Posadas
- Chanda Romero as Jenny
- Orestes Ojeda as Steven
- Gino Antonio as Tabby
- Estrella Kuenzler as Tita Mely
- Joel Lamangan as Pocholo
- Ronald Jayme as Mikey
- Suzanne Gonzales as Maid of Honor
- Miguel Vera as Bob
- Maureen Mauricio as Baby
- Augusto Victa as Mr. Atienza
- Archie Adamos as Emergency Room Doctor

== Production ==
The film Kasalanan Bang Sambahin Ka? is one of the first melodrama films directed by filmmaker Chito S. Roño, whose career in directing began in 1986.

== Reception ==
=== Critical reception ===
Columnist Jullie Y. Daza, writing for Manila Standard, described the film as "an almost step-by-step look-alike of Fatal Attraction", and gave praise to Roño's directorial effort and Velez's performance as a delusional woman.

=== Accolades ===
Award-giving organization	Date of ceremony	Category	Recipient(s)	Result	Ref.
1st Young Critics' Circle (YCC) Awards	1990	Silver Prize	Kasalanan Bang Sambahin Ka?	Won (Note: Shared with Bakit Kay Tagal ng Sandali? (also directed by Roño), Bakit Ikaw Pa Rin?, and Hahamakin Lahat.)	

== Controversy ==
Days after its initial release, the film drew controversy for the insertion of inappropriate scenes into the trailer that was not approved by the censorship board. According to MTRCB chairperson Manuel Morato, he said that they "received complaints over the weekend" and felt concerned that the younger audiences had also seen the provocative trailer during the showing of a "rated GP" film.

== See also ==
- Kailan Ka Magiging Akin, a 1991 melodrama film which was also directed by Roño and starred Diaz and Velez
