= Abay Babes =

Filipino comedy film

- Theatrical release poster
- Directed by: Don Cuaresma
- Written by: Alpha Habon; Don Cuaresma
- Produced by: Vicente G. del Rosario III
- Starring: Cristine Reyes; Nathalie Hart; Meg Imperial; Roxanne Barcelo; Kylie Verzosa; Tom Rodriguez; Mark Bautista; Marco Gumabao; Ronnie Liang; John Lapus
- Cinematography: Lee Meily
- Edited by: Vanessa De Leon
- Music by: Vincent de Jesus
- Production company: Viva Films
- Distributed by: Viva Films
- Release date: September 19, 2018
- Running time: 108 minutes
- Country: Philippines
- Language: Filipino

Abay Babes is a 2018 Filipino comedy film written and directed by Don Cuaresma, starring Cristine Reyes, Nathalie Hart, Meg Imperial, Roxanne Barcelo and Kylie Verzosa. The film was produced by Viva Films and it was released in the Philippines on September 19, 2018.

== Synopsis ==
Brides maids get into chaos, as their childhood friend is set to marry a man she dated online but never personally met.

== Cast ==
- Cristine Reyes as Ruby
- Nathalie Hart as Emerald
- Meg Imperial as Jade
- Roxanne Barcelo as Goldie
- Kylie Verzosa as Perla
- Tom Rodriguez as Zack Xavier
- Mark Bautista as Boy Giling
- Marco Gumabao as Rocky
- Ronnie Liang as Brent
- John Lapus as Boutique Owner
- Candy Pangilinan as Madam Astra
- Chad Kinis
- Mosang as Mother Superior
- Jiad Arroyo
- Gab Lagman
- Clark Merced
- Billy Villeta
- Aries Go
- Zandra Summer
- Kedebon Colim
- Mark Bautista as Boy Giling
