= Sin Island =

- Theatrical release poster
- Directed by: Gino M. Santos
- Screenplay by: Jancy E. Nicolas
- Story by: Kriz G. Gazmen
- Based on: Original screenplay by Keiko A. Aquino
- Produced by: Charo Santos-Concio; Malou N. Santos; Carlo L. Katigbak; Olivia M. Lamasan
- Starring: Xian Lim; Coleen Garcia; Nathalie Hart
- Cinematography: Mycko David
- Edited by: Noah Tonga
- Music by: Cesar Francis S. Concio
- Production company: Star Cinema
- Distributed by: ABS-CBN Film Productions
- Release date: February 14, 2018
- Running time: 110 minutes
- Country: Philippines
- Language: Filipino

Sin Island is a 2018 Philippine neo noir erotic thriller film directed by Gino M. Santos from a story by Kriz G. Gazmen and screenplay by Jancy E. Nicolas, based on the original screenplay concept by Keiko Aquino. Starring Xian Lim, Coleen Garcia, and Nathalie Hart, the story follows a couple whose happy marriage went into ruins when the wife was found committing an adulterous affair, prompting the husband to start his affair with another woman.

Produced and distributed by ABS-CBN Film Productions, the film was theatrically released on February 14, 2018.

== Plot ==
David (Xian Lim), a photographer, has been married to his flight attendant wife Kanika (Coleen Garcia) for two years, and they live an intimate life as a couple. One day, though, David catches Kanika cheating on him with her co-worker (TJ Trinidad), and spends some time apart from his wife by going to Sin Island (short for Sinilaban Island). At the beach, David sees a tattooed woman named Tasha (Nathalie Hart), a fashion designer who is practicing her yoga, and the two begin an affair. Meanwhile, Kanika decides to repair her relationship with David, but finds herself in conflict with Tasha, who has eventually become his mistress.

== Cast ==
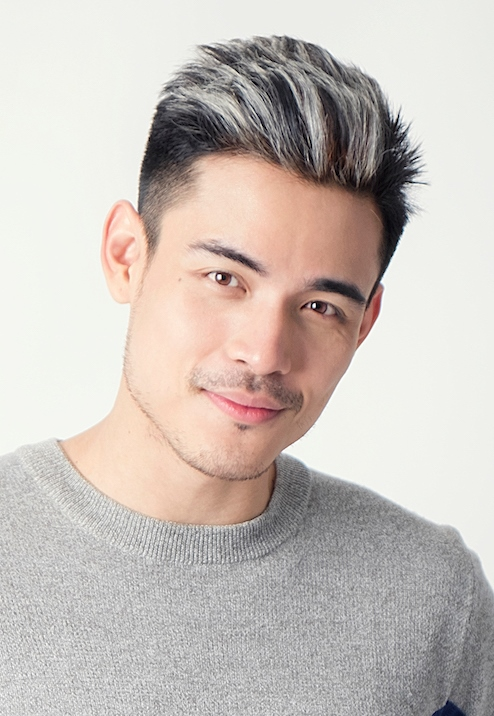
Xian Lim portrays David Santiago

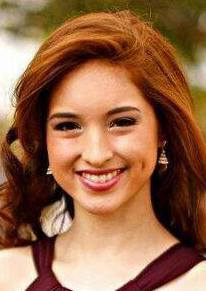
Coleen Garcia portrays Kanika Santiago

=== Main ===
- Xian Lim as David Santiago
- Coleen Garcia as Kanika Santiago
- Nathalie Hart as Tasha Cabonco

=== Supporting ===
- Bernard Palanca as Francis Cabonco
- Dominic Ochoa as Oliver Santiago
- Desiree del Valle as Meg
- Nikki Valdez as Jobelle
- Lito Pimentel as Alejandro
- Joyce Ann Burton as Cristine
- Thou Reyes as Emong
- Charlie Dizon as Cielo
- McCoy de Leon as Jack
- TJ Trinidad as Captain Stephen

== Theme ==
Jancy Nicolas, the screenwriter of Sin Island, elaborated on the film's theme of "fighting for love": "It really talks about redeeming love, redeeming a marriage, and fighting for it. More than 'yung edge niya (its edge), more than 'yung darkness niya (its darkness), it's really fundamentally a story of a marriage."

== Reception ==
Writing for Rappler, Oggs Cruz called Sin Island "very watchable" despite its flaws concerning the "tame" sex scenes as well as the "blatant illogic," incoherent plot. Philbert Dy, film critic for The Neighborhood who scored the film 0.5 out of 5, compared Sin Island to "children playing at being adults," and criticized its "subpar" production values, mediocre acting, and "poorly staged sex and violence".
