= List of Born for You episodes =

Born for You is a Philippine musical drama television series directed by Jonathan Diaz and Jon Villarin, starring Janella Salvador and Elmo Magalona. The series premiered on ABS-CBN's Primetime Bida evening block and worldwide on The Filipino Channel on June 20, 2016, replacing The Story of Us.

Born for You ended on September 16, 2016, ending its 3-month run with 65 episodes.

== List of episodes ==
No. of episodes	Title	HAIKU of the day	Summary	Original Air Date	Nationwide Ratings	Metro Manila Ratings
1	"The Red String"	"Ang bawat isa... Pulang laso'y kinabit sa nakatakda."	Samantha believes that it was through the red string of fate that her musically inclined parents, Buddy and Cathy, found each other.	June 20, 2016	17.1%	TBA
2	"Tangled"	"Taong lumipas... Hanggang kelan maghintay pusong mag-isa."	What future awaits for Sam and Cathy? How soon until Sam and Kevin's paths cross?	June 21, 2016	18.4%	TBA
3	"Shibuya"	"Di sinasadya, Pag-ibig na nawala. Muling nagtagpo"	A concert sends Kevin to Japan, where he and Sam finally bump into each other.	June 22, 2016	18.9%	TBA
4	"Kevin And Sam"	"May pagsubok man Wag hayaang mawala. Takdang pag-ibig"	After their chance meeting at the Shibuya crossing, Kevin and Sam bump into each other again.	June 23, 2016	19.4%	TBA
5	"Song For You"	"Pusong kinabit ng pulang laso't kanta. Tunay at wagas"	Sam becomes Kevin's interpreter.	June 24, 2016	20.1%	24.1%
6	"Chasing Dreams"	"Takdang pag-ibig Isang lingon lang sana. Nagsalisi pa"	The red string connection happens again as Sam goes to the Philippines.	June 27, 2016	16.6%	21.7%
7	"See You Again"	"Di man asahan Walang balak magkita... Tadhanang sagot"	Sam finds a new career.	June 28, 2016	17.8%	21%
8	"Love Flowers"	"Kahit masakit Titiisin ang lahat Para sa mahal"	Kevin will do anything to find Sam and win her heart.	June 29, 2016	16.9%	22.4%
9	"Special Delivery"	"Kaba at takot Dinaig ng pag-ibig Na galing sa'yo"	A special delivery comes with a special surprise.	June 30, 2016	16.1%	21%
10	"My Road Manager"	"Itanggi mo man 'Di mo kayang ilihim. Tibok ng puso.	Does RM mean Road Manager or Romantic Moments?	July 1, 2016	15.4%	20.5%
11	"Accidental Kiss"	"Kahit di sadya Bigyan ng kahulugan. Labing dumikit."	Marge asks Sam if she likes Kevin.	July 4, 2016	16.6%	21%
12	"Best RM Ever"	"Di din matiis, Pag wala ang 'yong ngiti. Mundo'y didilim"	In her efforts to keep Kevin from drinking anything alcoholic, Sam was the one who got drunk and almost told Kevin her true feelings for him.	July 5, 2016	15.4%	TBA
13	"Rush"	"Wag kalimutan. Pangakong di iiwan Ang pusong tapat."	Sam manages to conquer her fears after riding a helicopter to accompany Kevin at a mall tour. Her troubles, however, are far from over when she gets separated from Kevin upon arriving at the venue.	July 6, 2016	17.1%	TBA
14	"Keep Going"	"Ano mang hirap Pag-ibig at pangarap. Di bibitawan."	Sam gets left behind by the helicopter, leaving her with no choice but to find another way back to Manila.	July 7, 2016	17.8%	22%
15	"The One"	"Iwasang pilit 'Pag tadhana'ng nagkabit Pirming lalapit."	Sam quits her job as Kevin's road manager.	July 8, 2016	18.8%	21.3%
16	"Princess"	"Takot ipakita Paghanga't malasakit Baka tanggihan"	Much to her surprise, Sam wins the Princess of a Week contest, giving her the perfect opportunity to teach Kevin a thing or two about being a gentleman.	July 11, 2016	16.6%	21%
17	"Winner"	"Puso'y pakinggan Pagmamahal ay sugal Dapat tayaan"	Despite the positive reactions from family and fans alike, Sam and Kevin's first date ends with a misunderstanding.	July 12, 2016	17.1%	22.9%
18	"Get Even"	"Nagkukunwari... Pero kita ng lahat Laman ng puso."	Having enough of Sam's behavior, Kevin quits the Princess for a Week contest.	July 13, 2016	17.8%	20.9%
19	"Kids Day"	"Kahit may hadlang Pag-ibig magtatama Sa maling daan."	Kevin and Sam warm up to each other after enjoying a day with the orphans during their outreach program.	July 14, 2016	18.5%	21.7%
20	"Vacation"	"Kung nagmamahal Tadhana'ng maghahatid Sa isa't isa."	Kevin and Sam's family & friends going on a vacation.	July 15, 2016	19.8%	21.5%
21	"Beach Adventure"	"Sorpresang hatid Pag-ibig bumabalik. Puso'y ngumiti."	Kevin surprises Sam by bringing Cathy home.	July 18, 2016	16.6%	19.3%
22	"Surprise"	"Maghiwalay man Dalawang puso'y takda'y. Walang paalam."	Mike and Marge get into an argument because of Cathy.	July 19, 2016	16.9%	19.6%
23	"Prince Kevin"	"Sa bawat pasya 'Pag puso ang nasunod. 'Di magsisisi."	Kevin and Sam get ready for the Princess for a Week Grand Ball.	July 20, 2016	18.9%	20.3%
24	"Changes"	"Muling buhayin Pag-ibig at pangarap. Puso'ng nilihim"	Sam becomes famous after Princess for a Week.	July 21, 2016	16.6%	19.7%
25	"Offer"	"Kung magalangan Pumikit at pakinggan. Awit ng puso."	Ralph offers Sam to sign up record deal contract at Scion Records.	July 22, 2016	17.8%	21.2%
26	"Decision"	"Wag palampasin Bagong pintong nagbukas Patungo sa'yo."	Sam made a decision in signing up a contract at Vybe Records.	July 25, 2016	16.7%	18.6%
27	"Grateful"	"Katambal tayo Ngunit 'wag totohanin. Puso'y ingatan"	Marge and Mike officially launch Sam as one of Vybe's recording artists and she's going to work with Kevin.	July 26, 2016	17.3%	19.7%
28	"Music Camp"	"Isa kang awit Kinakanta ng puso. Inspirasyon ko"	Sam and Kevin begin their intensive training at the music camp.	July 27, 2016	16.4%	18.8%
29	"Workshop"	"Tahimik lahat Maliban sa puso kong Nagsusumigaw."	Sam cannot help but worry over her next workshop with Kevin.	July 28, 2016	16.8%	19.5%
30	"Special"	"Kaba at saya Sa oras ng pagsama. San 'to hahantong?"	Sam and Kevin get into a weekend getaway after their workshop.	July 29, 2016	18.0%	17.4%
31	"Getaway"	"Ang nagmamahal Maligaw man ng landas Tatagpo pa din."	Kevin and Sam's getaway does not end as they hoped for.	August 1, 2016	17.0%	20.9%
32	"Worried"	"Kahit pigilan Matibay na samahan Di matitinag"	The growing popularity of Kevin and Sam's love team does not sit well for someone close by.	August 2, 2016	17.3%	21.2%
33	"Agreement"	"Magkakilala di man umamin Nag-kaiibigan."	Kevin and Sam learn about their connection in the past.	August 3, 3016	16.8%	20.1%
34	"Reminisce"	"Kapag tinakda Tadhanang maglalapit sa puso nila."	Will anything change between Sam and Kevin after they discovered their childhood connection?	August 4, 2016	16.4%	20.0%
35	"Positivity"	"Pag katabi ka Sumasaya ang puso Yan ang pag-ibig."	Noticing that Kevin is feeling down, Sam tries to uplift his spirit with her positivity.	August 5, 2016	16.4%	17.9%
36	"Comfort"	"Ang nagmamahal Hindi ka pababayaan Hanggang sa huli."	Sam realizes a special event that immediately makes her sad	August 8, 2016	15.6%	20.5%
37	"Focus"	"Pag may pagsubok Wag hayaang humadlang sayong pangarap"	Sam walks out during their rehearsal because of her dad's memories and that's why she felt alone.	August 9, 2016	17.3%	21.8%
38	"Wait for You"	"Kung nalilito Tiyaga at unawa mo Magbubunga din."	Mike thinks of a solution to cure Sam's sadness.	August 10, 2016	15.3%	18.6%
39	"Battle"	"Tibok ng puso Pag iyong pinakinggan Di maliligaw"	Sam makes a difficult decision that Kevin disapproves of.	August 11, 2016	15.2%	18.1%
40	"Support"	"Pag may karamay Pag-ibig at pangarap ay makakamit."	Sam receives overflowing support from her family.	August 12, 2016	16.4%	18.2%
41	"Spark"	"Lihim harpoon Sana madiskubre na... Ang nararapat."	Ralph recruits the perfect person to bring the SamVin love team down.	August 15, 2016	13.5%	18.1%
42	"Match"	"Hindi madali Ingatan at paglaban Ang 'yong pag-ibig."	SamVin love team radio guests at M.O.R with DJ Chacha.	August 16, 2016	15.6%	18.6%
43	"First Feel"	"Sumasabog na! Hindi na maitago Sigaw ng puso."	Sam and Kevin are put in an awkward situation while shooting their music video.	August 17, 2016	15.9%	19.1%
44	"Love Advice"	"Wag nang pigilin Pag-ibig na nadarama Para sa kanya."	Upon learning that Kevin's feeling for Sam are serious, Ralph gives a love advice to his grandson.	August 18, 2016	14.9%	TBA
45	"London"	"Wag patagalin. Ba't di mo pa sabihin? Laman ng puso"	Sam and Kevin arrive in London for the Barrio Fiesta event.	August 19, 2016	16.7%	20.7%
46	"London Experience"	"Ang pagmamahal Lalabas din sa huli Kahit magtago"	Kevin becomes even more jealous upon learning about the identity of Sam's admirer.	August 22, 2016	15.5%	22.5%
47	"Jealous"	"Bagong pag-ibig Na tadhana'ng naghatid, Puso'y kabado"	Kevin finally meet Sam's secret admirer.	August 23, 2016	16.1%	20.2%
48	"Spy"	"Kung ika'y akin, pag-ibig ilalaban, Wag lang agawin."	Kevin feels jealous when Sam and Martin G. are together.	August 24, 2016	15.5%	18.4%
49	"London Barrio Fiesta"	"Kapag ang puso May iba nang may-ari Hirap mabawi."	Unable to keep his feelings anymore, Kevin breaks his deal with Sam.	August 25, 2016	14.9%	19.1%
50	"Serenade"	"Magkaibigan; Pintig ng puso'y dinggin: Nag-iibigan."	Kevin starts courting Sam.	August 26, 2016	13.8%	18.8%
51	"All For Love"	"Ang nakaraan sa panaginip muli'y Nagpaparamdam.	Sam continues to avoid being left alone with Kevin.	August 29, 2016	12.9%	17.2%
52	"Love Language"	"Aalamin ko Daan sa iyong puso, Di man mahalin"	Cathy finds out the song in her dreams, while Kevin also finds the perfect way to make Sam feel loved.	August 30, 2016	14.8%	17.7%
53	"The Moves"	"Laman ng puso Ipaalam sa lahat Dahil totoo"	Kevin starts to do services for Sam.	August 31, 2016	13.7%	17.9%
54	"The Past"	"Sa nagmamahal, Okay lang ang makulit Wag ang masungit."	Marge learns about what is happening between Sam and Kevin.	September 1, 2016	14.5%	19.2%
55	"Pagtuklas" (Discovery)	"Tagong sikreto, Unti unting nabubuo Tadhana ito	Cathy becomes suspicious of Marge after finding Buddy's old CDs.	September 2, 2016	16.8%	20.5%
56	"Ebidensya" (Evidence)	"Muling nagbalik Multo ng nakaraan Dapat harapin"	Cathy looks for Buddy's old notebook, which contains all of her husband's compositions.	September 5, 2016	14.5%	18.2%
57	"Plano" (Plan)	"Ano mang lihim Silaban ma't lipulin May usok pa rin"	An unknown man broke into Cathy's home and steals Buddy's old CD.	September 6, 2016	15.6%	19.2%
58	"Bistado" (No Longer Secret)	"Nakaraang sakit Sisira sa pangarap Ngayo'y nakamit"	Cathy looks into Buddy's old computer files, while Sam admits something to Kevin.	September 7, 2016	14.2%	20.4%
59	"Ang Katotohanan" (The Truth)	"Katotohanan: Saan man makarating Ipaglalaban."	Cathy consults a lawyer to see if she can file a case against the Sebastians.	September 8, 2016	15.2%	19.8%
60	"Kevin's Pain"	"Pusong umibig 'Di ba mapipigil ng Nagdaang pait?"	While Sam and Kevin become unsure on where their relationship stands, a scandal arises regarding Buddy's death.	September 9, 2016	15.7%	TBA
61	"Pagtutuos" (Arithmetic)	"Umiiwas na Kahit masakit para sa Damdamin ko"	The court releases its decision on the case filed by Cathy against Marge.	September 12, 2016	15.9%	19%
62	"Patuloy Ang Laban"(Fight Continue)	"Walang singsakit Tiwala'y naglaho na Nadungisan pa"	The Audience boos Sam of her song because of Marge and Niña accused to steal the song. Sam stands up to Marge by airing her side through an interview.	September 13, 2016	16.3%	19%
63	"Bangon Sam" (Founding Sam)	"Ipaglaban; Kung alin ba ang tama Para lang sa'yo"	Mike puts up his own recording label, while Ralph and Marge agree to merge their two companies.	September 14, 2016	17.3%	20.9%
64	"Pagsikat Ni Sam" Rising Sam)	"Sa tamang oras Tagumpay mararating Manalig ka lang"	Sam releases a new album under Evolve Music.	September 15, 2016	18.2%	22.4%
65	"Concert Finale"	"At hanggang wakas Pag-ibig magwawagi Pag-ibig pa rin"	Sam and Kevin proves that they are destined to each other as their story ends.	September 16, 2016	18.1%	20%
