= Alfred Labatos =

Filipino actor

- Born: Alfred Alain Corpuz Labatos; June 30, 1992 (age 33); Caloocan, Philippines
- Other names: Alfred; A; Alain; AL
- Occupation: Actor
- Years active: 1998–present
- Agent(s): Star Magic (1998–2019); Sparkle GMA Artist Center (2019–present)

Alfred Alain Corpuz Labatos (born June 30, 1992) is a Filipino actor working for ABS-CBN. He was first discovered in Eat Bulaga! when he joined the segment That's My Boy on 1998 before becoming a child actor. Labatos was a former cast member of now-defunct, long-running comedy gag show Goin' Bulilit. He voiced several characters in Japanese anime series (dubbed in Filipino) acquired by ABS-CBN, most of them previously aired on the now-defunct cable channel Hero TV.

== Filmography ==
=== Television ===
Year	Title
1998	Eat Bulaga!: That's My Boy 1998
1999	Magandang Tanghali Bayan: Little Santa Claus
1999	Wansapanataym: Mom and Pop Shop
1999	Wansapanataym: Anong Gusto Mong Maging
1999	Wansapanataym: Pokpok Palayok
2000	Home Along Da Riles
2000	Kakabakaba
2001	!Oka Tokat
2001	Ang TV 2
2001	Daddy Di Do Du
2002	Wansapanataym: Magic Beauty Box
2002	Wansapanataym: Pepay Pipoy Apoy
2003	Wansapanataym: Rajah Humaplos
2005	Mga Anghel na Walang Langit
2005	Goin' Bulilit
2007	Maalaala Mo Kaya: Isinuplong
2007	Pisay
2008	Maalaala Mo Kaya: Notebook
2009	The Singing Bee
2009	May Bukas Pa
2009	Maalaala Mo Kaya: Tattoo
2010	Maalaala Mo Kaya: Camera
2010	Maalaala Mo Kaya: Kwintas
2012–2014	Luv U
2013	Maalaala Mo Kaya: Saranggola
2016	Born For You

==== As voice actor ====
Title	Character
Boys Over Flowers	Song Woo Bin
Chaika: The Coffin Princess	Tohru Acura
D.C. ~Da Capo~	Junichi Asakura
Gintama	Gintoki Sakata
Godannar	
Hanasaku Iroha: Blossoms for Tomorrow	Toru Miyagishi
Kobato	Kiyokazu Fujimoto
KochiKame: Tokyo Beat Cops	Keiichi Nakagawa
Legends of Dawn: The Sacred Stone	Alucard
The Devil Is a Part-Timer!	Sadao Maou
The Eden of Grisaia	Yuji Kazami
The Fruit of Grisaia	Yuji Kazami
The World of a Married Couple	Tony
Tiger & Bunny	Barnaby Brooks, Jr. / Bunny
Yamada-kun and the Seven Witches	Ryu Yamada
