= Una Kang Naging Akin (film) =

1991 neo-noir crime romantic drama film by Laurice Guillen

- Official movie poster
- Directed by: Laurice Guillen
- Screenplay by: Orlando R. Nadres
- Story by: Helen Meriz
- Produced by: William C. Leary
- Starring: Sharon Cuneta; Gabby Concepcion; Dawn Zulueta
- Cinematography: Eduardo F. Jacinto
- Edited by: Efren Jarlego
- Music by: Willy Cruz
- Production company: Viva Films
- Release date: August 1, 1991
- Running time: 114 minutes
- Country: Philippines
- Language: Filipino

Una Kang Naging Akin (lit. 'You Were Mine First') is a 1991 Philippine neo noir crime romantic drama film directed by Laurice Guillen and written by Orlando R. Nadres, adapted from a comic series of the same name created and written by Helen Meriz and serialized via Pogi Komiks. Starring Sharon Cuneta, Gabby Concepcion, and Dawn Zulueta, the story follows an affluent business professional who was thought to have perished in a helicopter crash somewhere in Palawan and was stricken with amnesia but was torn between two women: a prominent socialite whom he was engaged to and a marine biologist's daughter.

Produced and distributed by Viva Films, the film premiered in Philippine theaters on August 1, 1991.

== Plot ==
The story starts with Nicolas Soriano Adriano III, who is about to leave for Palawan to celebrate his 26th birthday with his fiancée, Vanessa Yumol, a known socialite, and his mother, Doña Margarita Soriano Vda. de Adriano. On their way, their helicopter is hijacked and kills Nick's personal secretary. As Nick is fighting for his survival, he is shot, and the helicopter crashes in the mountains of Palawan. He is rescued by tribesmen, but suffers from amnesia. The news about the helicopter crash has broken out, and Nick is presumed dead.

While he's about to leave, he saves an old man from robbers. The man is Modesto Mallari, a known marine biologist. When Modesto asked for his name, Nick identified himself as Darwin Salvador. Modesto lives with his older sister Agnes, who is a spinster, and his only daughter Diosa, a known artist and painter. Diosa is cold towards Darwin for unknown reasons. However, her coldness ended when she was saved by Darwin from a deadly cobra. Darwin then told Modesto that he was leaving. But Modesto asked Darwin to stay. Diosa then told Darwin about her past. She had a boyfriend who was an airplane pilot. He proposed to her for marriage, but died in a plane crash. Diosa found out that her boyfriend was married and had children. Diosa had developed a friendship with Vanessa, who is a friend of Ely, who buys all of Diosa's artwork. Diosa and Darwin fell in love with each other, but Modesto disapproves of their relationship. The main reason for Modesto's disapproval is Darwin's condition and what the consequences would be if Darwin regains his memory. But Diosa confessed that she's pregnant, so Modesto had no choice but to let Darwin and Diosa marry. As Diosa was about to give birth, Darwin decided to fetch a doctor. As they were traveling, they were involved in a vehicular accident. When Darwin was being interviewed, he was agitated. He identified himself by his real name, thus regaining his memory. Diosa gave birth to a baby boy and named him Darwin Salvador Jr. Nick was given a warm welcome as he returned to Manila. Diosa decided to go to Manila and bring her son. But Modesto asked Diosa to stop what she was doing; afterwards, he suffered a heart attack and died. When Diosa learned about the wedding of Vanessa and Nick, she and her aunt Agnes decided to go to Manila and tell the truth. She also invoked her right as the legal wife of Nick. But when they went to the wedding, Nick didn't recognize Diosa. Agnes warned Diosa not to do anything that would ruin Nick and Vanessa's relationship. Diosa would become Nick's personal artist, but the two would develop feelings for each other, especially when Vanessa suffered a miscarriage in an accident.

Vanessa would discover Nick and Diosa's affair when she angrily stormed Diosa's house. In a heated argument, Nick told Vanessa that in order to love her again, Vanessa should give him a child. During Junior's birthday, Nick came to visit Diosa in Palawan. But Vanessa came the following day and attempted to kill Junior. Agnes, Nick, and Ely tried to restrain Vanessa. The trouble ended, and Vanessa asked for forgiveness from Diosa and to retain their friendship. In a fit of rage, Diosa told Vanessa that she was the one who took her husband, who was Nick. Diosa then told Vanessa about the helicopter crash that caused Nick to suffer amnesia and identify himself as Darwin Salvador. She also told her that they are legally married. Diosa then told Vanessa that the reason why Nick regained his memory was because of the bus accident at the birth of Junior. Diosa then showed Vanessa and Nick the pieces of memories, saying that Nick and Darwin are the same, and she said to Nick that she was his first love. Vanessa, Ely, and Nick left with Diosa all alone. To her surprise, Nick came, but he wanted to call her Darwin. But she insisted on calling him Nick. But he doesn't care whether she calls him Nick or Darwin; what's important is that he loves Diosa. In the closing credits, Diosa and Nick/Darwin are walking on the shoreline while the sun is setting.

== Cast ==
- Sharon Cuneta as Diosa Mallari
- Gabby Concepcion as Nicolas "Nick" Soriano Adriano III/Darwin Salvador
- Dawn Zulueta as Vanessa Yumul: A prominent socialite who is an art patroness and Nick's fiancée.
- Charito Solis as Agnes Mallari: Diosa's spinster aunt and Modesto's older sister.
- Eddie Gutierrez as Dr. Modesto Mallari: Diosa's father
- Michael de Mesa as Ely Solis
- Armida Siguion-Reyna as Doña Margarita Soriano vda. de Adriano: Nick/Darwin's mother.
- Jinky Oda as Nene
- Patrick Guzman as Ronaldo

== Production ==
Una Kang Naging Akin served as a cinematic reunion between Sharon Cuneta and Dawn Zulueta since they first appeared in Nakagapos na Puso in 1986 and also Cuneta's penultimate film with her ex-husband Gabby Concepcion.

== Reception ==
=== Accolades ===
Award-giving organization	Date of ceremony	Category	Recipient(s)	Result	Ref.
10th FAP Awards	March 29, 1992	Best Supporting Actress	Dawn Zulueta	Won	
10th FAP Awards	March 29, 1992	Best Story Adaptation	Una Kang Naging Akin; Adapted into a screenplay by Orlando R. Nadres	Won	
40th FAMAS Awards	April 7, 1992	Best Picture	Una Kang Naging Akin	Nominated	
40th FAMAS Awards	April 7, 1992	Best Actress	Sharon Cuneta	Nominated	
40th FAMAS Awards	April 7, 1992	Best Actor	Gabby Concepcion	Nominated	
40th FAMAS Awards	April 7, 1992	Best Supporting Actress	Dawn Zulueta	Won	

== Television adaptation ==
In 2008, the series was adapted by GMA Network as the tenth instalment of Sine Novela. Directed by Joel Lamangan, it starred Angelika Dela Cruz, Wendell Ramos, and Maxene Magalona. Due to ABS-CBN broadcast the Anne Curtis-topbilled teleserye whose title is similar to the film's main female lead at the time, Diosa was renamed to Jessa.
