= Nathalie Hart =

Filipino actress (born 1992)

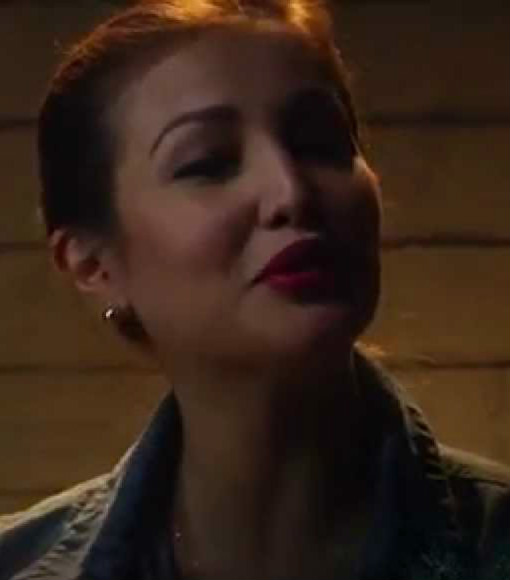
- Hart in 2014, speaking about the making of Dilim
- Born: Princess Tinkerbell Cristina Marjorie Pedere Snell; 14 April 1992 (age 34); San Pedro, Laguna, Philippines
- Other names: Kristina Snell; Princess Snell
- Occupations: Actress; model
- Years active: 2008–present
- Agents: Star Magic (2008–2009) GMA Artist Center (2009–2015); Viva Artists Agency (2018–present)
- Height: 5 ft 4 in (1.63 m)
- Spouse: Brad Robert (m. 2023, separated)
- Children: 1

Princess Tinkerbell Cristina Marjorie Pedere Snell (born 14 April 1992), known by her stage name Nathalie Hart, is a Filipino actress. She starred in the films Siphayo (2016), Sin Island, and Abay Babes (both 2018). She was nominated for the FAMAS Award for Best Actress for her role in Historiographika Errata (2017). She was a contestant in the reality talent competition StarStruck season 5 (2009–10), under the name Princess Snell, which she used until 2014.

== Career ==
Under the name Kristina Snell, she debuted in 2008 under ABS-CBN's talent agency Star Magic as part of batch 16.

In 2009, under the name Princess Snell, she participated in the fifth season of StarStruck, a reality talent competition show on GMA Network. She qualified for the show's final 14, but was eliminated with Piero Vergara during the double eliminations in the fifth week.

In 2014, with the advice of her manager, she adopted the screen name Nathalie Hart. Referring to her real name, she explained: "It's just not really nice when you're getting old, and your name is still Disneyland!"

Hart's first lead role in film was in Siphayo (2016). Directed by Joel Lamangan, Siphayo was an entry to the International Film Festival Manhattan (IFFM) in New York City, where Hart won the best actress award.

For her performance as Librada in Historiographika Errata (2017), Hart was nominated for the FAMAS Award for Best Actress.

In 2018, Hart co-starred in the romance thriller Sin Island with Xian Lim and Coleen Garcia. She was then featured on the cover of FHM Philippines' May 2018 issue, which was the magazine's final print edition. Later that year, she co-starred in the comedy film Abay Babes with Cristine Reyes, Meg Imperial, Roxanne Barcelo and Kylie Verzosa.

== Personal life ==
In February 2019, Hart gave birth to her daughter in Sydney, Australia. In January 2021, she revealed her separation from the father of her daughter, Indian businessman Mayank Sharma.

In July 2023, Hart married Brad Robert (an Australian) in Sydney. In October 2024, she revealed that they had separated.

== Filmography ==
=== Film ===
Year	Title	Role	Notes	Source
2014	Somebody to Love			
2014	Dilim	Aya		
2014	Shake, Rattle & Roll XV	Pamela	Segment: "Flight 666"	
2015	Balatkayo			
2015	The Prenup	Genie		
2016	My Rebound Girl	Sofia		
2016	Siphayo	Alice		
2016	Tisay			
2017	Historiographika Errata			
2018	Sin Island	Tasha Cabonco		
2018	Kusina Kings	Jenny Perez		
2018	Abay Babes	Emerald		
2019	Barbara Reimagined	Barbara		
2020	Sunday Night Fever	Kim		
2020	Pakboys Takusa	Natasha		
2021	Steal	Platinum		
2022	Reroute	Lala		

=== Television ===
Year	Title	Role	Notes	Source
2009	Your Song Presents: Underage	Lina	Credited as "Kristina Snell"	
2009	Kambal sa Uma	Myka	Credited as "Kristina Snell"	
2009	I Love Betty La Fea	Herself ― Ecomodel	Cameo	
2009–2010	StarStruck	Herself	Eliminated (Week 6)	
2010	Panday Kids	Luningning		
2010	Survivor Philippines: Celebrity Showdown	Herself	Quit (Day 2)	
2010	Reel Love Presents: Tween Hearts	Vanessa		
2010	Jillian: Namamasko Po	Maya		
2011	My Lover, My Wife	Hazel		
2011	Captain Barbell: Ang Pagbabalik	Margarita / Marnie		
2012	My Beloved	Trixie Montenegro		
2012	Kasalanan Bang Ibigin Ka?	Carissa		
2012	Makapiling Kang Muli	Monina		
2012	Yesterday's Bride	Erica Samonte		
2012	Magdalena: Anghel sa Putikan	Chloe		
2013	Indio	Young Victoria Sanreal	Special participation	
2013	Maghihintay Pa Rin	Stella Cruz-Villafuerte		
2013	Genesis	Vanessa Viola		
2014	Villa Quintana	Elena		
2014	The Borrowed Wife	Mariel Quesada		
2014	Innamorata	Jessica		
2014	More Than Words	Young Precy		
2014	Strawberry Lane	Joanna		
2015	Second Chances	Yvette		
2018	The Blood Sisters	Sahara		
2019	Uncoupling			
2020	Ipaglaban Mo!	Carmina	Episode: "Tukso"	
2020	Pamilya Ko	Christina "Tina" Rubiñol		
2021	Maalaala Mo Kaya	Tina Boado	Episode: "Lie Detector"	
2025	AFAM Wives Club	Herself		

== Awards and nominations ==
Year	Work	Association	Category	Result	Source
2016	Siphayo	International Film Festival Manhattan: Film Festival Director Award	Best Actress	Won	
2018	Historiographika Errata	FAMAS Awards	Best Actress	Nominated	
