= Born for You =

2016 Philippine television drama series

- Title card
- Genre: Romance; Drama; Music; Comedy
- Created by: Rondel P. Lindayag; Reggie Amigo
- Written by: Benedict Mique; Nathaniel Arciaga; Abi Lam Parayno; Allan Cuadra
- Directed by: Onat A. Diaz; Jon S. Villarin; Jerry Lopez Sineneng; Jerome C. Pobocan; Darnel Joy R. Villaflor
- Creative director: Johnny Delos Santos
- Starring: Janella Salvador; Elmo Magalona
- Music by: Emerzon Texon
- Opening theme: "Born for You" by David Pomeranz
- Composers: David Pomeranz; David Zippel
- Country of origin: Philippines
- Original language: Filipino
- No. of episodes: 65 (list of episodes)

Production
- Executive producers: Carlo L. Katigbak; Cory V. Vidanes; Laurenti Dyogi; Roldeo T. Endrinal
- Producer: Cathy Magdael-Abarrondo
- Production locations: Manila; Tokyo; Honshu; London
- Editors: Rommel Malimban; Jay Mendoza
- Running time: 30–38 minutes
- Production company: Dreamscape Entertainment Television

Original release
- Network: ABS-CBN
- Release: June 20 – September 16, 2016

Born for You is a 2016 Philippine musical drama television series broadcast by ABS-CBN. Directed by Onat A. Diaz, Jon S. Villarin, Jerry Lopez Sineneng, Jerome C. Pobocan and Darnel Joy R. Villaflor, it stars Janella Salvador and Elmo Magalona. It aired on the network's Primetime Bida line up and worldwide on TFC from June 20 to September 16, 2016, replacing The Story of Us and was replaced by Magpahanggang Wakas in Till I Met You's timeslot.

An ancient Japanese myth tells the story about the Red String of Fate, it's when two people with connecting red strings are destined to meet and fall in love. A young hopeless romantic and a Celebrity Heartthrob who share the same love for music find themselves tangled up in their shared past and their connecting red string of fate.

The show ended on September 16, 2016, with a live concert finale held at the Kia Theatre, with a total of 65 episodes and it was replaced by Magpahanggang Wakas, but the schedule time is after FPJ's Ang Probinsyano, while Till I Met You took over Born for You's timeslot.

The series is streaming online on YouTube.

== Plot ==
Sam Kazuko (Janella Salvador) is an aspiring Filipino singer who grew up in Japan. A hopeless romantic, she believes in the concept of Red string of fate, a Japanese Belief which says that an invisible red string connects a person to their destined soulmate. On the other hand, Kevin Sebastian (Elmo Magalona), a popular teen heartthrob in the Philippines and son of an OPM icon Mike Sebastian (Ariel Rivera), who popularized the song "Born For You", doubts the authenticity of love and destiny, because of the complicated relationship of his parents. Their common love for music is what brings Sam and Kevin together, but it also becomes an obstacle to their budding romance. Sam's father, Buddy (Bernard Palanca), composed the song "Born For You" for his wife, Cathy (Vina Morales), but Marge (Ayen Munji-Laurel), the daughter of the country's richest record label owner, stole the song and gave it to Mike in hopes of saving his music career. Buddy confronted Marge, and this resulted in an accident which caused Buddy's death. Following the death of Buddy, Cathy becomes an OFW in Japan in order to support Sam and her mother, Caring (Gina Pareño). She then meets a Japanese bonsai maker who offers to marry her so that she can bring Sam to Japan. As fate would have it, Kevin goes to Japan to promote his new single for his new album. There, Sam meets Kevin as they bump into each other in the Shibuya crossing. Kevin fell in love at first sight with Sam and pursues to know her even more. Kevin and Sam grows closer as Sam helps out as Kevin's translator. When it was time for Kevin to go back to the Philippines, he tells Sam he hopes to see her again. After Kevin goes back to the Philippines, Sam decides she wants to go back to the Philippines to be a singer. In the Philippines, Sam gets a job as a "Singing Delivery Girl" where she delivers flowers and sings as well.

== Cast and characters ==
=== Main cast ===
- Janella Salvador as Samantha "Sam" P. Reyes / Sam Kazuko
- Elmo Magalona as Kevin M. Sebastian
- Vina Morales as Catherine "Cathy" Pelayo-Reyes
- Ariel Rivera as Michael "Mike" Sebastian
- Ayen Munji-Laurel as Margaret "Marge" Marquez-Sebastian
- Gina Pareño as Caridad "Lola Caring" Pelayo
- Freddie Webb as Ralph Marquez

=== Supporting cast ===
- Kyline Alcantara as Chloe M. Sebastian
- Ogie Diaz as Desmond
- Francis Magundayao as Allan
- Makisig Morales as Jepoy
- Ysabel Ortega as Niña
- Neil Coleta as Patrick
- JV Kapunan as Mix
- Jimboy Martin as Joms
- Alfred Alain as Funky
- Katya Santos as Tess
- DJ Durano as Leonard
- Jett Pangan as Marcus
- Paolo O'Hara as Boogie
- Joj Agpangan as Mica
- Smokey Manaloto as Jimmy
- Michelle Madrigal as Rodessa

=== Guest cast ===
- Ashley Sarmiento as young Sam Reyes Kazuko
- Richmont Padayao as young Kevin Sebastian
- Bernard Palanca as Salvador "Buddy" Reyes
- Niña Dolino as Racquel
- Nyoy Volante as Mon
- Erik Santos as himself
- Karylle as herself
- Jhong Hilario as himself
- Teddy Corpuz as himself
- Raikko Mateo as Boogie Jr.
- Diego Loyzaga as himself
- Loisa Andalio as herself
- Negi as himself
- DJ Chacha Balba as herself
- Kit Thompson as Martin Gonzales
- Richard Yap as himself
- Boy Abunda as himself

== Official soundtrack ==
Born for You (Original Motion Picture Soundtrack)

Soundtrack album by Janella Salvador, Elmo Magalona, and David Pomeranz
- Released: August 30, 2016
- Recorded: 2016
- Genre: OPM, Pop, Soundtrack
- Length: 38:51
- Language: Filipino, English, Japanese
- Label: Star Music

Born for You (Sam & Kevin)
No.	Title	Performer(s)	Length
1.	"Born for You (Duet Version)"	Elmo Magalona and Janella Salvador	3:45
2.	"Pangarap Lang"	Janella Salvador	3:11
3.	"You'll Be Safe Here"	Elmo Magalona	4:32
4.	"Stay"	Elmo Magalona	4:05
5.	"Same Ground"	Janella Salvador	4:30
6.	"Ikaw (Duet Version)"	Janella Salvador and Elmo Magalona	4:00
7.	"Born for You"	David Pomeranz	4:21
8.	"Ikaw"	Janella Salvador	4:00
9.	"Yume Dake Da (Pangarap Lang)"	Janella Salvador	3:11
10.	"Anata (Ikaw)"	Sky Gonda	3:16
Total length:			38:51

== Production ==
The project was announced on November 26, 2015. Janella Salvador was cast in the female lead role, while Elmo Magalona signed a two-year exclusive contract with ABS-CBN. Acting workshops were held the following days for Magalona and Salvador to "break the ice" and form their "chemistry." Casting began the following month, and Onat Diaz (who previously directed And I Love You So) was hired to direct. The drama is Ayen Munji-Laurel's first teleserye project in ABS-CBN, as well as Vina Morales and Ariel Rivera's reunion project three years after Maria Mercedes. Filming for the drama started in March 2016, shooting some scenes in Japan for the pilot week.

Ariel Rivera's character in the afternoon drama Doble Kara was killed off to give way for this project.

== Reruns ==
The show began airing re-runs on Jeepney TV from October 10, 2021 to March 20, 2022; December 28, 2024 to March 9, 2025 and from June 29 to September 25, 2026.

== Reception ==
KANTAR MEDIA NATIONAL TV RATINGS (9:30PM PST)
PILOT EPISODE	FINALE EPISODE	PEAK	AVERAGE	SOURCE
17.1%	18.1%	20.1%	18.4%	

== See also ==
- List of programs broadcast by ABS-CBN
- List of ABS-CBN Studios original drama series
- List of programs broadcast by Jeepney TV
