= Arci Muñoz =

Filipina actress (born 1989)

- Born: Ramona Cecilia Datu puti Munyosi; January 12, 1989 (age 37); Quezon City, Philippines
- Education: University of the Philippines Diliman
- Occupations: Actress; model; singer; dancer
- Years active: 2005–present
- Agents: Sparkle (2005–2010); Viva Artists Agency (2013–2016); Star Magic (2017–2025); Talent5 (now Star Worx) (2010–2013; 2026–present)
- Height: 5 ft 6 in (168 cm)
- Political party: Lakas–CMD (since 2021)
- Other political affiliations: KBL (until 2021)
- Military career
- Allegiance: Philippines
- Branch: Philippine Air Force; Air Force Reserve Command
- Service years: 2020–present
- Rank: Sergeant

Ramona Cecilia "Arci" Datuin Muñoz (born January 12, 1989) is a Filipino actress and singer. She is the vocalist of the Filipino rock band Philia and currently serving in the Philippine Air Force as a Sergeant.

== Career ==
Muñoz entered the entertainment industry through the third season of the reality talent show, StarStruck in 2005. After StarStruck, she appeared in several television shows on GMA and TV5, and in 2008, she represented the Philippines in the third annual Asia Super Model Contest.

Before gaining the leading lady status, Arci Munoz played some evil villain and cunning roles in Princess Charming (2007), Pati Ba Pintig ng Puso (2007), Zaido: Pulis Pangkalawakan (2007), and Maging Akin Ka Lamang (2008).

Later in 2009, she played the main antagonist role of Donna Benitez in Ngayon at Kailanman. Donna is the obsessive girlfriend of Edwin (played by JC de Vera) who will do everything for him even committing murder, kidnapping, and vile schemes.

In 2010, she appeared as the Melanie Tecson, a recurring antagonist in Langit sa Piling Mo.

In 2011, she appeared again as the main antagonist of My Driver Sweet Lover as the evil scheming Monique and pulls everything to steal Rocky (played by JC de Vera) from Gabrielle.

In 2012, she started as felina in the hit show Felina: Prinsesa ng mga Pusa. This was her first lead role.

Since then, she became a leading actress in TV5 and ABS-CBN. On April 27, 2013, Muñoz's band Philia played at Pulp Summer Slam 13: "Til Death Do Us Part".

Muñoz transferred to ABS-CBN in September 2014 and is cast as one of the main stars of Pasion de Amor.

On July 17, 2020, it was announced that Muñoz joined the series on Kapamilya Channel's Walang Hanggang Paalam, after Julia Montes and Nadine Lustre are backed out.

Meanwhile, on September 30, 2021, Muñoz announced she is running for councilor in Cainta, Rizal under the political party Lakas-Christian Muslim Democrats' (Lakas-CMD).

On December 17, 2021, Muñoz appeared on the music video of TOMORO and Sean Kingston.

== Filmography ==
=== Film ===
| Year | Title | Role | Ref. |
|---|---|---|---|
| 2013 | The Fighting Chefs | Sexy Chef | |
| 2015 | Felix Manalo | Tomasa Sereneo | |
| 2015 | Etiquette for Mistresses | Amanda | |
| 2015 | A Second Chance | Ara Cervantes | |
| 2016 | Always Be My Maybe | Kristina 'Tintin' Paraiso | |
| 2016 | Camp Sawi | Gwen | |
| 2017 | Extra Service | Aurora | |
| 2017 | Extra Service | Kapitana | |
| 2017 | Extra Service | Aw | |
| 2017 | Can We Still Be Friends? | Sam | |
| 2019 | Last Fool Show | Mayessa Dominguez | |
| 2019 | Open | Rome | |
| 2019 | Isa Pa with Feelings | Annica | |
| 2020 | Hayop Ka! The Nimfa Dimaano Story | Jhermelyn (voice) | |
| 2023 | Ten Little Mistresses | Aura | |
| 2023 | Malditas in Maldives | Anais Escudero | |
| 2023 | Njel de Mesa's Kabit Killer | Kiki | |
| 2025 | Sinagtala | Carla | |
| 2026 | Sweet Escape | Cindy | |

=== Television ===
| Year | Title | Role | Ref. |
|---|---|---|---|
| 2005–2006 | StarStruck: The Nationwide Invasion | Herself / Contestant | |
| 2006 | Agawin Mo Man ang Lahat | Chantal | |
| 2006–2007 | Bakekang | Nicole | |
| 2007 | Princess Charming | Pamela | |
| 2007 | Sine Novela: Pati Ba Pintig ng Puso | Claire | |
| 2007–2008 | Zaido: Pulis Pangkalawakan | Amasonang Puti / Stacy | |
| 2008 | Sine Novela: Maging Akin Ka Lamang | Olive Paruel | |
| 2008 | Ako si Kim Samsoon | Lourdes | |
| 2008–2009 | Sine Novela: Saan Darating ang Umaga? | Bianca | |
| 2009 | SRO Cinemaserye: Ganti ng Puso | Annie | |
| 2009 | Maynila: Death, Be Not Proud | Ruby | |
| 2009 | Sine Novela: Ngayon at Kailanman | Donna Benitez | |
| 2009–2010 | StarStruck V | Herself / Segment Host | |
| 2010 | Diva | Natalie | |
| 2010 | Langit sa Piling Mo | Melanie Tescon | |
| 2010 | Untold Stories Mula sa Face to Face | Monique Barrinuevo | |
| 2010–2011 | Beauty Queen | Kaye Santos | |
| 2010–2011 | My Driver Sweet Lover | Monique | |
| 2010–2011 | Midnight DJ | Various Roles | |
| 2011 | Mga Nagbabagang Bulaklak | Dahlia Flores / Carnation | |
| 2011 | Ang Utol Kong Hoodlum | Vanessa | |
| 2011–2012 | The Jose and Wally Show Starring Vic Sotto | Alexandra Vergara | |
| 2012–2013 | Lokomoko | Herself | |
| 2012 | Felina: Prinsesa ng mga Pusa | Felina | |
| 2012 | Pidol's Wonderland | Various roles | |
| 2012 | Wil Time Bigtime | Herself | |
| 2013 | Wowowillie | Herself | |
| 2013 | Undercover | Julia Velasco | |
| 2013 | The Gift | Ella | |
| 2015–2020; 2023–present | ASAP | Herself / Performer | |
| 2015 | Maalaala Mo Kaya: Spaghetti | Lara | |
| 2015 | Ipaglaban Mo: Pagmamahalang Hinadlangan | Lucy | |
| 2015–2016 | Pasión de Amor | Norma Elizondo-Samonte | |
| 2016–2017 | Magpahanggang Wakas | Atty. Aryann Castillo | |
| 2017 | I Can Do That | Herself / Contestant | |
| 2017-2018 | Ikaw Lang ang Iibigin | Alexandra "Alex" Flores–Torres | |
| 2018 | Since I Found You | Daniella "Dani" Cobarrubias-Capistrano | |
| 2018 | I Can See Your Voice PH | Herself / Guest Singer | |
| 2019 | Jhon en Martian | Princess 223 / Martina | |
| 2019 | Ipaglaban Mo: Taiwan | Baby | |
| 2019–2020 | Pamilya Ko | Elizabeth "Betty" Palisoc | |
| 2020; 2024–2025 | It's Showtime | Herself / Guest / Performer | |
| 2020–2021 | Walang Hanggang Paalam | Samantha "Sam" Agoncillo | |
| 2021 | Maalaala Mo Kaya: Tattoo | Karla Bonifacio | |
| 2023–2025 | Family Feud | Herself / Contestant | |
| 2024–2025 | Fast Talk with Boy Abunda | Herself / Guest | |
| 2026 | Kumusta | Herself | |
| 2026 | Someone, Someday | Gia | |
| 2026 | Eat Bulaga! | Herself – The Age is Right Agent | |
| 2026–present | Sigabo | Maxene "Max" Jacinto | |

== Accolades ==
| Year | Award giving body | Category | Nominated work | Result | Ref. |
|---|---|---|---|---|---|
| 2019 | Pista ng Pelikulang Pilipino (PPP) | Best Actress | —N/a | Nominated | |
| 2024 | Jinseo Arigato International Film Festival | Best International Filipino Actress | Body of work | Won | |
| 2024 | Wu Wei Taipei International Film Festival | Best Actress | Malditas in Maldives | Won | |
| 2025 | Global Filipino Icon Awards | Global Influencer in Lifestyle and Entertainment | —N/a | Won | |
| 2025 | 20th Asia Model Festival | Asia Special Award (International Actor) | —N/a | Won | |
| 2026 | Sinag Maynila Film Festival | Best Actress (Sinag Award) | Sweet Escape | Nominated | |
