= Pasión de Amor (Philippine TV series) =

2015–16 Philippine television drama series

- Title card
- Genre: Family drama Romance; Revenge; Crime; Action
- Created by: Willy Laconsay
- Based on: Pasión de Gavilanes by Julio Jiménez
- Developed by: ABS-CBN Studios
- Written by: Tanya Winona Bautista; Jose Ruel L. Garcia; Ruel Montañez; Christine Gara; Chie E. Floresca
- Directed by: Eric S. Quizon; Don M. Cuaresma; Carlo Po Artillaga; Raymund B. Ocampo
- Creative director: Dang Fortalez-Baldonado
- Starring: Jake Cuenca; Arci Muñoz; Ejay Falcon; Ellen Adarna; Joseph Marco; Coleen García
- Music by: Jessie Lasaten
- Opening theme: "Akin Ka Na Lang" by Morissette
- Composer: Francis "Kiko" Salazar
- Country of origin: Philippines
- Original language: Filipino
- No. of seasons: 3
- No. of episodes: 194

Production
- Executive producers: Carlo Katigbak; Cory Vidanes; Laurenti Dyogi; Ruel Bayani
- Producers: Jayson Aracap Tabigue; Celeste Villanueva Lumasac; Ana Maria A. Zamora; Rizza Gonzales-Ebriega; Annaliza A. Goma
- Production locations: Manila, Philippines
- Editors: Jay Mendoza; Froilan Francia
- Running time: 45 minutes
- Production companies: Telemundo Internacional; RSB Drama Unit

Original release
- Network: ABS-CBN
- Release: June 1, 2015 – February 26, 2016

Related
- Pasión de Gavilanes

Pasión de Amor (lit. 'Passion of Love') is a Philippine television drama romance series broadcast by ABS-CBN. The series is based on the 2003 Colombian telenovela Pasión de Gavilanes. Directed by Eric S. Quizon, Don M. Cuaresma, Carlo Po Artillaga and Raymond B. Ocampo, it stars Jake Cuenca, Arci Muñoz, Ejay Falcon, Ellen Adarna, Joseph Marco, Coleen Garcia. It aired on the network's Primetime Bida line up and worldwide on TFC from June 1, 2015 to February 26, 2016, replacing Inday Bote and was replaced by We Will Survive.

This show that launches the main villains: Gabriella (Teresa Loyzaga), a cunning and evil mother of Elizondo sisters, Lazaro (Dante Ponce), a heartless syndicate leader, and Gabriel (Wendell Ramos), a powerful henchman to make the Samonte brothers and Elizondo sisters hellish.

The story revolves around the Samonte brothers who set out to avenge the death of their youngest sister. They do this by making the Elizondo sisters fall in love with them.

== Plot ==
Pasión de Amor follows the story of the Samonte family: Juan (Jake Cuenca), Oca (Ejay Falcon), Cocoy (Joseph Marco), and Lyvia (Ingrid dela Paz). Juan, being the eldest, wanted to provide a better life for his family after the death of their parents. Little did Juan and his brothers know that Lyvia was seeing a much older and wealthy man, Bernardo Elizondo (Ronaldo Valdez). When Bernardo's wife, Gabriela (Teresa Loyzaga), finds out about his affair, she hires men to kill Lyvia. After Lyvia is brutally raped and murdered, Juan and his brothers will stop at nothing to bring justice to her death.

The Samonte brothers infiltrates the household of the Elizondos, the family Juan suspects is responsible for what happened to Lyvia. There, Juan meets Gabriela — the powerful matriarch, and Norma (Arci Muñoz) — the mysterious eldest daughter who has unwittingly captured his interest.

The more he spends time with the family, the more he's sure of Gabriela's guilt. But her daughters, Norma in particular, will protect their family and their mother no matter what. Juan must think of a way to get closer to the truth he's so desperately seeking, and the only way he finds is to make Norma fall in love. As time passes they have to fight for their love under the dangers brought by Gabriel Salcedo (Wendell Ramos), Gabriela's illegitimate son with Lazaro's (Dante Ponce).

As Juan and Norma get married alongside Oca and Sari (Ellen Adarna) & Cocoy and Jamie (Coleen Garcia), they suffer under the hands of Lazaro and Gabriel during their honeymoon. They succeed in killing Jamie. Lazaro and Gabriel then kidnaps Oca, Sari, Norma, Juan and the rest including JD. Gabriel commands his henchmen to plant a bomb in the cave and they successfully destroy it but fail as they are caught causing Norma to have an accident in order for her and Juan’s son to escape. As for Gabriela, she teams up with them to kill her son to stop his plan. She kills both Lazaro and Gabriel in order to be safe.

Norma is sent to the hospital to recover but the doctors state that Norma will die. This causes Gabriela to redeem her soul and regret her sins. At the hospital lobby, the Elizondos and Samontes are visited by a young image of the Elizondos father, Bernardo, who gives his daughter her life back and gives a chance at redemption, as a sign of Gabriela's sorrowful cries and hopes of a new hope. Two years later, they finally live a peaceful life after all their struggles and hardships in the past years. Juan remembers his promise to his father: as the eldest he must be ready to protect his loved ones.

== Cast and characters ==
=== Main cast ===
- Jake Cuenca as Juancho "Juan" A. Samonte / Juan Reyes - Oscar, Franco's and Lyvia's older brother, Norma's husband and JD's father, Jamie, and Sari's brother-in-law.
- Arci Muñoz as Norma S. Elizondo-Samonte - Bernardo and Gabriela's eldest daughter. Sari and Jamie's older sister, Juan's wife, and JD's mother. Oscar and Franco's sister-in-law.
- Ejay Falcon as Oscar "Oca" A. Samonte / Oscar Santos - Juan's younger brother, Franco, and Lyvia's older brother, Sari's husband. Jamie and Norma's brother-in-law, and uncle of JD.
- Ellen Adarna as Sarita "Sari" S. Elizondo-Samonte - Bernardo and Gabriela's second daughter. Jamie's older sister and Norma's younger sister. Oscar's wife. Juan and Franco's sister-in-law, Aunt of JD.
- Joseph Marco as Franco "Cocoy" A. Samonte - Juan and Oscar's younger brother, Lyvia's older brother. Jamie's husband. Norma and Sari's brother-in-law. uncle of JD and Olivia.
- Coleen García as Jimena "Jamie" S. Elizondo-Samonte† - Bernardo and Gabriela's youngest daughter, Norma, and Sari's younger sister. Franco's wife. Juan and Oscar's sister-in-law. aunt of JD. She dies after being shot by one of Lazaro and Gabriel's henchmen after attempting to kidnap Franco during her honeymoon in a yacht.

=== Supporting cast ===
- Enzo Andrei de Castro as Juan David "JD" E. Samonte - Norma and Juan's son.
- Dante Ponce as Lazaro Madrigal† - a heartless syndicate leader and Gabriel's father, in love with Gabriela, and when an incident happens with Gabriela, everyone thought Gabriela has been dead but for some reason, Lazaro hides her on an island. In the hottest finale, Lazaro is one of the masterminds along with Gabriel behind kidnapping of Samonte-Elizondo clan and responsible behind bombing in the cave. He was killed by Oscar when he attempted to kill Gabriela and Franco.
- Wendell Ramos as Gabriel S. Madrigal† - Gabriela's black sheep son, he is a powerful henchman who makes the lives of the Samonte brothers and Elizondo sisters hellish. And also he is the right-hand son of Lazaro in his syndicate involving drug dealing. In the hottest finale, Gabriel is one of the masterminds along with Lazaro behind kidnapping of Samonte-Elizondo clan and he commands his henchmen to plant the bomb and he successfully destroyed the cave but failed because the Samonte-Elizondo clan are survived in the bombing. He was killed by Franco after he tries to kill his own mother for abandoning him and his little sister, Daniela.
- Teresa Loyzaga as Doña Gabriela Salcedo-Elizondo / Gabriela Salcedo-Madrigal - Norma, Sarita, and Jimena's cunning and evil mother.
- Ahron Villena as Fernando Madrigal† - Norma's ex fiancee . He falls in love with Gabriela. Later in the series, he was killed by Gabriela by ordering Gabriel to poison him.
- Michelle Madrigal as Lucia "Cia" Espejo - Juan, Oscar, Franco's childhood friend. Gabriel's girlfriend with a twist, She needs to make Gabriel fall in love with her, to make an eye for the Samonte brothers, to know Gabriel's plan.
- Pen Medina as Maryo "Mayor" Adriano - Elle's uncle.
- Pilar Pilapil as Maria Eduvina Suarez† - a rich spinster who took the Samonte brothers under her wing. When she died the Samontes inherited her wealth.
- Kazel Kinouchi as Eliza "Elle" Adriano - Franco's ex-girlfriend who despises Jamie.
- Daria Ramirez as Eva Rodriguez - Kiko's mother; Elizondo Family's housekeeper.
- Aubrey Miles as Rosario "DJ Rio" Montes-Burgos
- Zeppi Borromeo as Dos Roque Alvarez, Jr. - Leonora Alvarez's brother; Juan, Oscar, Franco, and Lyvia's uncle.
- Jojo Riguerra as Pepito "Ping" Canlas
- Marco Lumba as Mike Galvez
- Cara Eriguel as Detective Anna Miranda

=== Guest cast ===
- Carlos Morales as Mattheus
- Nathaniel Britt as Kiko Rodriguez - Eva Rodriguez's son
- Jae Cochon as Daniella Salcedo Madrigal - Norma, Sari, and Jamie's maternal half-sister. Also Gabriel's youngest sister.
- Benj Bolivar as Miggy
- June Macasaet as Mike
- Denisse Aguilar as Paula
- Natalia Moon as Dancer at Bridal Shower
- Akiko Solon as Lucy
- Josh Ivan Morales as Norma's rapist
- Dionne Monsanto as KC
- Alex Castro as Architect Gelo Corpuz
- Paolo Rivero as Foreman
- Aiko Climaco as Marga
- Menggie Cobarrubias as Eduvina's doctor
- Judy Saril as Barbie
- Hazel Faith dela Cruz as Agnes
- Jocelyn Medina as Mrs. Chavez
- Hannah Ledesma as Claire
- Jonic Magno as Atty. Lopez

=== Special participation ===
- Ronaldo Valdez as Don. Bernardo Elizondo Jr.† - Gabriela Salcedo's husband; Norma, Sarita, and Jamie's father; Lyvia Samonte's lover. He was killed by his wife, Gabriella.
- Ingrid dela Paz as Olivia "Lyvia" A. Samonte† - Juan, Oscar, and Franco's youngest sister, and Don. Bernardo Elizondo's mistress. She was killed by Gabriella's three henchmen.
- Lorenzo Mara as Orlando Samonte† - Juan, Oscar, Franco, and Lyvia's father.
- Yayo Aguila as Leonora Alvarez-Samonte† - Orlando Samonte's wife; Juan, Oscar, Franco and Lyvia's mother.
- Dominic Ochoa as Carlos Suarez
- Dimples Romana as young Eduvina Suarez
- AJ Dee as Daniel Burgos
- Micah Muñoz as Jomar - one of Lazaro and Gabriel's henchmen and a gardener

=== Special finale participation ===
- Alex Gonzaga as Jenny - a customer of Franco's new own hotel.
- Unknown actress as Olivia "Livya" Samonte II - a daughter of Norma Elizondo and Juan Samonte. Norma named Olivia after Juan's youngest sister.
- Unknown actor as Oscar Sean Samonte Jr. - a son of Oscar Samonte and Sari Elizondo.

== Scheduling ==
Initially meant to be part of ABS-CBN's Kapamilya Gold afternoon block, based on the first teaser, declaring that Pasión de Amor will be airing on Kapamilya Gold in May 2015. But on a last minute change — due to other network's shows currently airing on the said block (two other teleseryes, Koreanovela Let's Get Married and soon to be successor Pinoy Big Brother: 737 Gold) however, the timeslot was later announced as part of Primetime Bida evening block and finally aired on June 1, 2015, after the network decided to immediately end Inday Bote until May 29, 2015, due to low ratings and lack of support. The schedule time is before TV Patrol.

== Re-runs ==
It aired on Cine Mo! from June 22, 2015 to March 18, 2016.

This series had re-runs on Jeepney TV from January 9 to May 19, 2017 (replacing the re-runs of Nathaniel); July 23 to November 30, 2018 (replacing the re-runs of Katorse); January 16 to June 26, 2021 (replacing the re-runs of Two Wives 2014); and October 23, 2023 to July 19, 2024 (replacing the re-runs of Dugong Buhay).

== Promotion ==
This show was the first lineup of family, multiple romance, and criminal drama of RSB Drama Unit and it co-existed by Doble Kara, which produced by Dreamscape Entertainment. It was succeeded by Wildflower.

== Reception ==
=== Ratings ===
Kantar Media National TV Ratings (11:15AM PST)
Pilot Episode	Finale Episode	Peak	Average
19.2% June 8, 2015	16.8% March 4, 2016	23.4% September 28, 2015	

== See also ==
- Pasión de gavilanes
- List of ABS-CBN Studios original drama series
- List of Jeepney TV original programming
