= 40th PMPC Star Awards for Movies =

2024 Philippine Movie Press Club awards

40th Star Awards for Movies
- Date: July 21, 2024
- Hosted by: Aiko Melendez; Bianca Umali; Robi Domingo; Alden Richards
- Organized by: Philippine Movie Press Club (PMPC)

Highlights
- Best Picture: Mallari; Litrato (Indie)
- Most awards: Mallari (7)
- Most nominations: Firefly (15)

Television coverage
- Network: A2Z Channel

The 40th PMPC Star Awards for Movies was an awards ceremony recognizing outstanding achievements in Philippine cinema for films released in 2023. Organized by the Philippine Movie Press Club (PMPC), the event was held on July 21, 2024, at the Henry Lee Irwin Theatre of Ateneo de Manila University in Quezon City under the leadership of their President Rodel Ocampo Fernando.

It was hosted by Aiko Melendez, Bianca Umali, Robi Domingo, and Alden Richards. In the lead-up to the ceremony, a partial list of winners was released publicly, while the awards for Movie Actress of the Year, Movie Actor of the Year, Indie Movie of the Year, and Indie Movie Director of the Year were announced during the event itself. Mallari was the top winner of the night, receiving seven awards, including Movie of the Year, while Firefly received the most nominations. Litrato was named Indie Movie of the Year. The ceremony was broadcast on A2Z Channel on July 27, 2024.

== Winners and Nominees ==
The following are the nominations for the 40th PMPC Star Awards for Movies, covering films released from January to December 2023.

Winners are listed first and indicated in bold.

=== Major categories ===
Movie of the Year (Mainstream)	Movie of the Year (Indie)
Winner: **Mallari** (Mentorque Inc. and Cleverminds Inc.): Family of Two (Cineko Productions); Firefly (GMA Public Affairs and GMA Pictures); Five Breakups and a Romance (Cornerstone Studios, GMA Pictures, Myriad Entertainment); Gomburza (JesCom Films and MQuest Ventures, and CMB Films); Rewind (ABS-CBN Film Productions, APT Entertainment, AgostoDos Pictures) ·; When I Met You in Tokyo (JG Productions Inc.)	Winner: **Litrato** (3:16 Media Network): Ako si Ninoy (Philippine Stagers Films); Fall Guy (3:16 Media Network, Mentorque Productions); In His Mother's Eyes (7K Productions); Iti Mapukpukaw (Cinemalaya Foundation, Project 8 Projects, Terminal Six, and GMA Public Affairs); Monday First Screening (Net25 Films and Lonewolf Films); Pieta (Alternative Vision Cinema)
Movie Director of the Year (Mainstream)	Movie Director of the Year (Indie)
Winner: **Roderick Cabrido** (Mallari): Nuel Crisostomo Naval (Family Of Two); Mae Czarina Cruz Alviar (Rewind); Pepe Diokno (Gomburza); Zig Dulay (Firefly); Rommel Penesa and Conrado Peru (When I Met You In Tokyo); Irene Villamor (Five Breakups and A Romance)	Winner: **Louie Ignacio** (Litrato): Adolfo Alix, Jr. (Pieta); Joel Lamangan (Fall Guy); Benedict Mique (Monday First Screening); Carl Joseph Papa (Iti Mapukpukaw); FM Reyes (In His Mother's Eyes); Vincent Tañada (Ako Si Ninoy)
Movie Actor of the Year	Movie Actress of the Year
Winner: Tied between **Alden Richards** (Five Breakups and A Romance) and **Dingdong Dantes** (Rewind): Sean De Guzman (Fall Guy); Christopher De Leon (When I Met You In Tokyo); Cedrick Juan (Gomburza); Coco Martin (Apag); Piolo Pascual (Mallari); Roderick Paulate (In His Mother's Eyes); Romnick Sarmenta (About Us But Not About Us); Alfred Vargas (Pieta)	Winner: Tied between **Maricel Soriano** (In His Mother's Eyes), **Nora Aunor** (Pieta), and **Vilma Santos-Recto** (When I Met You In Tokyo): Gina Alajar (Monday First Screening); Kathryn Bernardo (A Very Good Girl); Sharon Cuneta (Family of Two); Ai-Ai Delas Alas (Litrato); Alessandra De Rossi (What If); Gladys Reyes (Apag); Marian Rivera (Rewind)
Movie Supporting Actor of the Year	Movie Supporting Actress of the Year
Winner: Tied between **JC Santos** (Mallari) and **LA Santos** (In His Mother's Eyes): Elijah Canlas (Gomburza); Dingdong Dantes (Firefly); Pepe Herrera (Rewind); Piolo Pascual (Gomburza); Bembol Roco (Pieta)	Winner: **Gladys Reyes** (Here Comes The Groom): Gina Alajar (Pieta); Dolly De Leon (Keys To The Heart); Alessandra De Rossi (Firefly); Gloria Diaz (Mallari); Liza Lorena (Litrato); Cherry Pie Picache (Firefly)
Movie Ensemble Acting of the Year	Indie Movie Ensemble Acting of the Year
Winner: **Mallari**: The Cast of Firefly; The Cast of Five Breakups And A Romance; The Cast of Gomburza; The Cast of Keys To The Heart; The Cast of Rewind; The Cast of When I Met You In Tokyo	Winner: **Pieta**: The Cast of About Us Not About Us; The Cast of Ang Duyan Ng Magiting; The Cast of Apag; The Cast of In His Mother’s Eyes; The Cast of Litrato; The Cast of Monday First Screening
New Movie Actor of the Year	New Movie Actress of the Year
Winner: **Dustin Yu** (Shake, Rattle & Roll Extreme – Rage episode): Ron Angeles (Mallari); Elyson De Dios (In His Mother's Eyes); Shun Mark Gomez (Huling Palabas); Fino Herrera (Here Comes The Groom); Markus Joseph Manuel (Unspoken Letters); Ninong Ry (Shake Rattle and Roll Extreme – Mukbang episode); Charles Temones (Losers 1, Suckers 0)	Winner: **Ysabel Ortega** (Firefly): Jorrybell Aguto (Tether); Ashley Diaz (Mary Cherry Chua); Aya Fernandez (Rookie); Zeinab Harake (Kampon); Cassy Legaspi (When I Met You In Tokyo); Eisel Serrano (Love You Long Time); Pat Tingjuy (Rookie)
Movie Child Performer of the Year
Winner: **Euwenn Mikaell** (Firefly): Stanley Abuloc (Swing); Queenzy Calma (Unravel: A Swiss Side Love Story); Erin Espiritu (Papa Mascot); Jordan Lim (Rewind); Jewel Milag (Ang Mga Kaibigan Ni Mama Susan); Althea Ruedas (Instant Daddy)

=== Technical categories ===
Movie Screenwriter of the Year (Mainstream)	Movie Screenwriter of the Year (Indie)
Winner: **Rodolfo Vera and Pepe Diokno** (GomBurZa): Angeli Atienza (Firefly); Penzer Baterna (Instant Daddy); Suzette Doctolero (When I Met You In Tokyo); Enrico Santos (Mallari); Enrico Santos (Rewind); Enrico Santos (Wish You Were The One)	Winner: **Ralston Jover** (Litrato): Dustin Celestino (Ang Duyan Ng Magiting); Jerry Gracio (Pieta); Jerry Gracio and Gina Marissa Tagasa (In His Mother's Eyes); Benedict Mique and Aya Anunciacion (Monday First Screening); Carl Joseph Papa (Iti Mapukpukaw); Jun Robles Lana (About Us But Not About Us)
Movie Cinematographer of the Year (Mainstream)	Movie Cinematographer of the Year (Indie)
Winner: **Neil Daza** (Firefly): Albert Banzon (What If); Neil Daza (Rewind); Carlo Mendoza (Gomburza); Pao Orendain (Mallari); Shayne Sarte (When I Met You In Tokyo); Noel Teehankee (A Very Good Girl)	Winner: **Tom Redoble** (Unravel: A Swiss Side Love Story): Neil Daza and Rap Ramirez (In His Mother's Eyes); Che Espiritu (As If It's True); Nelson Macababat Jr. (Pieta); TM Malones (Fall Guy); TM Malones (Litrato); Rap Ramirez (Apag)
Movie Production Designer of the Year (Mainstream)	Movie Production Designer of the Year (Indie)
Winner: **Ericson Navarro** (GomBurZa): Ferdi Abuel (Five Breakups And A Romance); Marielle Hizon (Mallari); Shari Marie Montiague (Rewind); Buboy Tagayon and Rey Peru (When I Met You In Tokyo); Elfren Vibar (Family of Two); Kenneth Kevin Villanueva (Firefly)	Winner: **Dante Mendoza** (Apag): Jay Custodio (Litrato); Marxie Maolen Fadul (In His Mother's Eyes); Josiah Hiponia (Ang Duyan Ng Magiting); Rhamil Manlulu Pineda and Zimba Seduki (Ako Si Ninoy); Jhon Paul Sapitula (Pieta); Enrico Torralba (Monday First Screening)
Movie Editor of the Year (Mainstream)	Movie Editor of the Year (Indie)
Winner: **Noah Tonga** (Mallari): Benjo Ferrer (Firefly); Froilan Francia (When I Met You In Tokyo); Marya Ignacio (Rewind); Benjamin Tolentino (Gomburza); Noah Tonga (Wish You Were The One); Vanessa Ubas De Leon (Instant Daddy)	Winner: **Gilbert Obispo** (Litrato): Ysabelle Denoga (Apag); Vanessa Ubas De Leon (In His Mother's Eyes); Janel Gutierrez (Ang Duyan Ng Magiting); Xila Ofloda and Mark Llona (Pieta); Benjamin Tolentino (Iti Mapukpukaw); Noah Tonga (Monday First Screening)
Movie Musical Scorer of the Year (Mainstream)	Movie Musical Scorer of the Year (Indie)
Winner: **Francis Concio** (Rewind): Teresa Barrozo (Gomburza); Len Calvo (Firefly); Len Calvo (Five Breakups and a Romance); Von De Guzman (Mallari); Andrew Florentino (A Very Good Girl); Jessie Lasaten (When I Met You In Tokyo)	Winner: **Pipo Cifra** (Ako Si Ninoy): Jake Abella (Apag); Isha Abubakar (Monday First Screening); Teresa Barrozo (About Us But Not About Us); Teresa Barrozo (Iti Mapukpukaw); Mikoy Morales (Pieta); Carmina Robles Cuya (In His Mother's Eyes)
Movie Sound Engineer of the Year (Mainstream)	Movie Sound Engineer of the Year (Indie)
Winner: **Immanuel Verona and Fatima Nerikka Salim** (Mallari): Aian Louie Caro (Family Of Two); Albert Michael Idioma (Firefly); Albert Michael Idioma, Emilio Bien Sparks, Janina Minglanilla (Gomburza); Emilio Bien Sparks and Michael Keanu Cruz (Rewind); Boom Suvagondha (A Very Good Girl); Immanuel Verona and Fatima Nerikka Salim (When I Met You In Tokyo)	Winner: **Albert Michael Idioma** (Apag): Lamberto Casas Jr. (Iti Mapukpukaw); Albert Michael Idioma and Garem Roi Rosales (In His Mother's Eyes); Fatima Nerikka Salim (Fall Guy); Emilio Bien Sparks and Andrea Teresa Idioma (Ako Si Ninoy); Immanuel Verona (Litrato); Immanuel Verona (Pieta)
Movie Theme Song of the Year (Mainstream)	Movie Theme Song of the Year (Indie)
Winner: **“Pag-Ibig Na Sumpa”** - composed by Quest Arranged and interpreted by JK Labajo (Mallari): "Lifetime" (Seasons); "Panghabangbuhay" (Sa Muli); "Sa Duyan Ng Bayan" (Gomburza); "Sa Yakap Mo" (Family Of Two); "There's No Getting Away From You" (What If)	Winner: **“Awit Para Kay Inay”** - composed by Louie Ignacio; Arranged by Jem Florencio Interpreted by Duane David (Litrato): "Hustisya" (Fall Guy); "Ikaw Lang Ang Mahal" (Ikaw At Ako); "Pambawi Ay Ikaw" (Ako Si Ninoy); "Paralaya" (Apag); "Patawad Inay" (In His Mother's Eyes); "Sa Ating Paglipad" (Papa Mascot)

=== Short films ===
Short Movie of the Year	Short Movie Director of the Year
Winner: **RRRHRWR, Carabao Noises** (Blue Dreams Productions): Bilog Ang Bulan (Dark Media Creations); Boi (Talahib Films and Blue Lights Production); Katulad Mo Rin Ako (Rebel Films); Mary Go Round, Mary Go Round (Sting Productions); Old Times (Hafool Studios); Tara? Takbo! (Mi Casa Pelikula); Tukador Ni Tatang (Rems Entertainment Production)	Winner: **Vahn Leinard Pascual** (Mary Go Round, Mary Go Round): Eljay Castro Deldoc and Drew Espenocilla (Fish Be With You?); Jannela Kyla Dela Peña (RRRHRWR, Carabao Noises); Luke Del Castillo (Boi); Diana Galang (Tara? Takbo!); Jan Christian Garcia (Katulad Mo Rin Ako); Gabby Ramos (Tukador Ni Tatang); Chaela Tordillo Old Times

== Special awards ==
Darling of the Press	Movie Loveteam of the Year
Winner: Ramon “Bong” Revilla, Jr.: Alden Richards; Gladys Reyes; Gretchen Barretto; Liza Diño-Seguerra; Piolo Pascual; Rhea Tan; Robin Padilla	Winner: Alden Richards and Julia Montes (Five Break Ups and a Bar): Aljur Abrenica and AJ Raval (Sugapa); Carlo Aquino and Charlie Dizon (Third World Romance); Darren Espanto and Cassy Legaspi (When I Met You In Tokyo); David Licauco and Shaira Diaz (Without You); Miguel Tanfelix and Ysabel Ortega (Firefly); Rayver Cruz and Julie Anne San Jose (The Cheating Game); Ruru Madrid and Yassi Pressman (Video City, Be Kind, Please Rewind)

- Nora Aunor Ulirang Artista Lifetime Achievement Award - Liza Lorena
- Ulirang Alagad ng Pelikula sa Likod ng Kamera Lifetime Achievement Award - Vic del Rosario Jr.
- Takilya King and Queen - Dingdong Dantes and Marian Rivera
- Ethel Ramos Dean's Lister Award - Ronald K. Constantino
- Male Shining Personality of the Night - Alden Richards
- Male Face of the Night - Robi Domingo
- Female Face of the Night - Marian Rivera
- Female Shining Personality of the Night - Aiko Melendez
- Star of the Night - Aiko Melendez
- Celebrity of the Night - Nora Aunor

=== Dekada awardees ===
The Dekada awardees are determined by the actors and actresses with the most acting awards in the 40-year history of the Star Awards for Movies, with the top two in each category recognized.

- Nora Aunor
- Vilma Santos
- Christopher de Leon
- Piolo Pascual

== Most nominations ==
The following table lists the films with the most nominations for this PMPC Star Awards for Movies edition. Counts include all competitive categories.

Nominations by Film
Nominations	Film
14	Firefly (Note: Count does not include nomination for Movie Loveteam of the Year)
14	In His Mother's Eyes
14	Mallari
13	GomBurZa
13	Pieta
13	Rewind
12	When I Met You in Tokyo

== Most wins ==
The following table lists the films with the most wins for this PMPC Star Awards for Movies edition. Counts include all competitive categories.

Wins by Films
Wins	Films
7	Mallari
5	Litrato
3	Firefly
