= 2023 Summer Metro Manila Film Festival =

Film festival in the Philippines

2023 Summer Metro Manila Film Festival 1st Summer Metro Manila Film Festival
- No. of films: 8
- Festival date: April 8–18, 2023

Summer MMFF chronology
- ~~2020~~

The 2023 Summer Metro Manila Film Festival was an iteration of the annual Summer Metro Manila Film Festival held in Metro Manila and throughout the Philippines. It was organized by the Metropolitan Manila Development Authority (MMDA) in partnership with the Cinema Exhibitors Association of the Philippines. The theme of the film festival would be "Tuloy-tuloy ang Saya" (lit. 'The fun continues').

The inaugural edition was supposed to be held in 2020, but was cancelled due to the COVID-19 pandemic. The 2023 edition is now considered to be the first iteration of the film festival.

Following the organization of the 2022 Metro Manila Film Festival, the MMDA announced on January 9, 2023, that the summer film festival will be held from April 8 to 18, 2023. The parade of stars was scheduled to be held on April 1, 2023, while the awards night will be on April 11, 2023.

The deadline of submission for entries was set on February 17, 2023.

== Entries ==
The Metro Manila Film Festival (MMFF) Executive Committee announced the eight official entries on February 24, 2023.

Title	Starring	Production company	Director/s	Genre
About Us But Not About Us	Elijah Canlas, Romnick Sarmenta	The IdeaFirst Company, Octoberian Films & Quantum Films	Jun Lana	Drama
Apag	Coco Martin, Lito Lapid, Gladys Reyes	Centerstage Productions, CCM Creatives	Brillante Mendoza	Drama
Here Comes the Groom	Eugene Domingo, Enchong Dee, Keempee de Leon, Awra Briguela, Maris Racal, KaladKaren	Quantum Films, Cineko Productions, Brightlight Productions	Chris Martinez	Comedy
Kahit Maputi Na ang Buhok Ko	RK Bagatsing	Saranggola Media Productions	Joven Tan	Drama, Musical
Love You Long Time	Carlo Aquino, Eisel Serrano	Studio Three Sixty Inc.	JP Habac	Drama
Single Bells	Angeline Quinto, Alex Gonzaga, Aljur Abrenica	Tincan, The Fifth Studio	Fifth Solomon	Comedy
Unravel: A Swiss Side Love Story	Gerald Anderson, Kylie Padilla	Mavx Productions	RC Delos Reyes	Romance, Drama
Yung Libro sa Napanood Ko	Bela Padilla, Yoo Min-Gon	Viva Communications	Bela Padilla	Drama, Romance

== Parade of Stars ==
The Parade of Stars, a motorcade of floats featuring the eight official entries, for the 2023 Summer MMFF was held in Quezon City on April 2, 2023. The route started at the Villa Beatriz along Commonwealth Avenue to the Quezon Memorial Circle.

== Awards ==
2023 Summer Metro Manila Film Festival Gabi ng Parangal
- Date: April 11, 2023
- Site: New Frontier Theater, Quezon City

Highlights
- Best Picture: About Us But Not About Us
- Best Director: Jun Lana (About Us But Not About Us)
- Best Actor: Romnick Sarmienta (About Us But Not About Us)
- Best Actress: Gladys Reyes (Apag)
- Most awards: About Us But Not About Us (10)

Television coverage
- Channel: One PH
- Network: TV5

The Gabi ng Parangal (transl. Awards Night) of the 2023 Summer Metro Manila Film Festival will be held at the New Frontier Theater in Quezon City on April 11, 2023.

=== Major awards ===
Winners are listed first, highlighted in boldface, and indicated with a double dagger (‡). Nominations are also listed if applicable.

Best Picture	Best Director
**About Us But Not About Us – The Ideafirst Company, Octobertrain Films & Quantum Films**‡; Love You Long Time – Studio Three Sixty Inc. (2nd Best Picture); Here Comes the Groom – Quantum Films, Cineko Productions, Brightlight Productions (3rd Best Picture)	**Jun Lana – About Us But Not About Us**‡; JP Habac – Love You Long Time; Chris Martinez – Here Comes The Groom
Best Actor	Best Actress
**Romnick Sarmienta – About Us But Not About Us**‡; Gerald Anderson – Unravel: A Swiss Side Love Story; Carlo Aquino – Love You Long Time; Elijah Canlas – About Us But Not About Us; Enchong Dee – Here Comes the Groom; Yoo Min-gon – Yung Libro sa Napanood Ko	**Gladys Reyes – Apag**‡; Bela Padilla – Yung Libro sa Napanood Ko; Kylie Padilla – Unravel: A Swiss Side Love Story
Best Supporting Actor	Best Supporting Actress
**Keempee de Leon – Here Comes the Groom**‡; Aljur Abrenica – Single Bells; Nico Antonio – Here Comes the Groom; Ariel Rivera – Kahit Maputi Na ang Buhok Ko; Xilhouette – Here Comes the Groom	**KaladKaren – Here Comes the Groom**‡; Ana Abad Santos – Love You Long Time; Maris Racal – Here Comes the Groom
Best Screenplay	Best Cinematography
**About Us But Not About Us**‡; Here Comes the Groom; Love You Long Time; Unravel: A Swiss Side Love Story	**About Us But Not About Us**‡; Love You Long Time; Unravel: A Swiss Side Love Story
Best Production Design	Best Editing
**About Us But Not About Us**‡; Here Comes the Groom; Unravel: A Swiss Side Love Story; Yung Libro sa Napanood Ko	**About Us But Not About Us**‡; Here Comes the Groom; Love You Long Time; Yung Libro sa Napanood Ko
Best Sound	Best Original Theme Song
**About Us But Not About Us**‡; Here Comes the Groom; Love You Long Time; Unravel: A Swiss Side Love Story; Yung Libro sa Napanood Ko	**"Paralaya" from Apag – by Andy Alviz**‡
Best Musical Score	Best Float
**About Us But Not About Us**‡; Love You Long Time; Unravel: A Swiss Side Love Story; Yung Libro sa Napanood Ko	**Love You Long Time**‡; About Us But Not About Us; Apag; Here Comes the Groom; Kahit Maputi Na ang Buhok Ko; Single Bells; Unravel: A Swiss Side Love Story; Yung Libro sa Napanood Ko
Special Jury Prize	
**Elijah Canlas – About Us But Not About Us**‡; **Here Comes the Groom**‡	

=== Multiple awards ===
Awards	Film
10	About Us But Not About Us
3	Here Comes the Groom
2	Apag

=== Multiple nominations ===
Nominations	Film
12	Here Comes the Groom
11	About Us But Not About Us
10	Love You Long Time
8	Unravel: A Swiss Side Love Story
7	Yung Libro sa Napanood Ko
3	Apag
2	Kahit Maputi Na ang Buhok Ko
2	Single Bells

Preceded by 2020 Metro Manila Summer Film Festival cancelled due to the COVID-19 pandemic	2023 Summer Metro Manila Film Festival; 2023	Succeeded by TBA (Not held in 2024)
