= Here Comes the Bride (2010 film) =

- Theatrical movie poster
- Directed by: Chris Martinez
- Written by: Chris Martinez
- Produced by: Charo Santos-Concio; Malou Santos; Orly R. Ilacad; Josabeth V. Alonso
- Starring: Eugene Domingo; Angelica Panganiban; John Lapus; Tuesday Vargas; Jaime Fabregas
- Cinematography: Rodolfo Aves Jr.
- Edited by: Ike Veneracion
- Music by: Von de Guzman
- Production companies: ABS-CBN Film Productions; OctoArts Films; Quantum Films
- Distributed by: Star Cinema
- Release date: May 12, 2010
- Running time: 108 minutes
- Country: Philippines
- Language: Filipino
- Box office: ₱117 million

Here Comes the Bride is a 2010 Filipino comedy film starring Angelica Panganiban, Eugene Domingo, Tuesday Vargas, Jaime Fabregas, Tom Rodriguez, and John Lapus. It was released by Star Cinema and directed by Chris Martinez.

The film had international screenings in select cities in the United States such as in San Francisco, Milpitas, Vallejo, Los Angeles (all in California), Bergenfield in New Jersey and Guam. A stand-alone sequel, titled Here Comes the Groom, was released in 2023.

== Plot ==
On Stephanie's wedding day, her mother tells her that it is an auspicious day as a solar eclipse will occur. Among those who will attend are: Precy, a single, middle-aged, and feisty lawyer who is the godmother. Medelyn, an overworked nanny preparing her bratty ward Inaki, who will be a ring-bearer, and Bien, the sickly grandfather of the groom Harold, who is paying for the wedding. Toffee, still embittered after a break-up, is part of the wedding's hair and makeup team.

As the wedding entourage makes their way to the resort venue in Batangas, they traverse the Magnetic Hill in Los Baños, Laguna. Soon, the eclipse happens and they meet a freak car accident. As they regain consciousness, they realize that they had undergone a body switch: Precy's soul goes to Medelyn's body; Medelyn's soul goes to Bien's body; Bien's soul goes to Toffee's body; and unfortunately for Stephanie, Toffee's soul goes to her body and her soul goes to Precy's body.

The souls in their new bodies nearly cause a ruckus right before the wedding: Precy, in Medelyn's body, disciplines her ward and gets a chance with love with the driver, Ding; Medelyn, in Bien's body, is amazed with how she is treated in comfort because of his age and money; Bien, in Toffee's body, is sexually renewed and enamors Mariz, the maid of honor, after accidentally wrecking her makeup; Toffee, in Stephanie's body, takes advantage of his new female physique; while Stephanie, in Precy's body, races time, distance, and confinement in a lunatic asylum to save her wedding, which pushes through without incident.

On what should have been their first night of matrimony, Stephanie escapes the asylum and convinces Mariz of the truth after she reveals personal details of her life, and Harold, who is bewildered at how Toffee has been acting differently in Stephanie's body. They then gather Precy, Medelyn, Bien, and Toffee, and seek help from Kuya Kim Atienza, a fellow resort guest, to fix the body switch. Kuya Kim explains that the switch is because of the soul displacement due to the eclipse at Magnetic Hill. He cautions that the souls may only revert to their original bodies if they recreate the accident on the same hill during the next solar eclipse, which will happen in two years. While waiting, all of them agree to decide to stay together in one house, except for Toffee, who is forcibly locked in a room after she tries to flee the resort in Stephanie's body.

Two years pass and they recreate the accident. On the first attempt, Stephanie has the soul of Medelyn, Precy has the soul of Bien, Medelyn has the soul of Toffee, Toffee has the soul of Precy, and Bien has the soul of Stephanie. On the second attempt, Stephanie has the soul of Bien, Precy has the soul of Toffee, Bien has the soul of Precy, Toffee has the soul of Medelyn, and Medelyn has the soul of Stephanie. When they attempt it for the third time, Stefanie has the soul of Precy, who has the soul of Medelyn, who has the soul of Bien, who has the soul of Toffee, who has the soul of Stephanie. They then attempt a fourth time, successfully but leaving them hospitalized with injuries from the successive crashes. At the hospital, Precy hires Ding as her new driver, Medelyn is comforted by a now docile Inaki, Toffee despairs at returning to his body until a group of young male nurses assist him, Bien introduces Mariz to his grown-up children as their new mother, and Stephanie and Harold try to share a romantic moment but fall down their beds after being weighed down by their casts.

At the end of the movie, it is explained that the quintet's souls have been connected from the beginning of humans in the Philippines.

== Cast ==
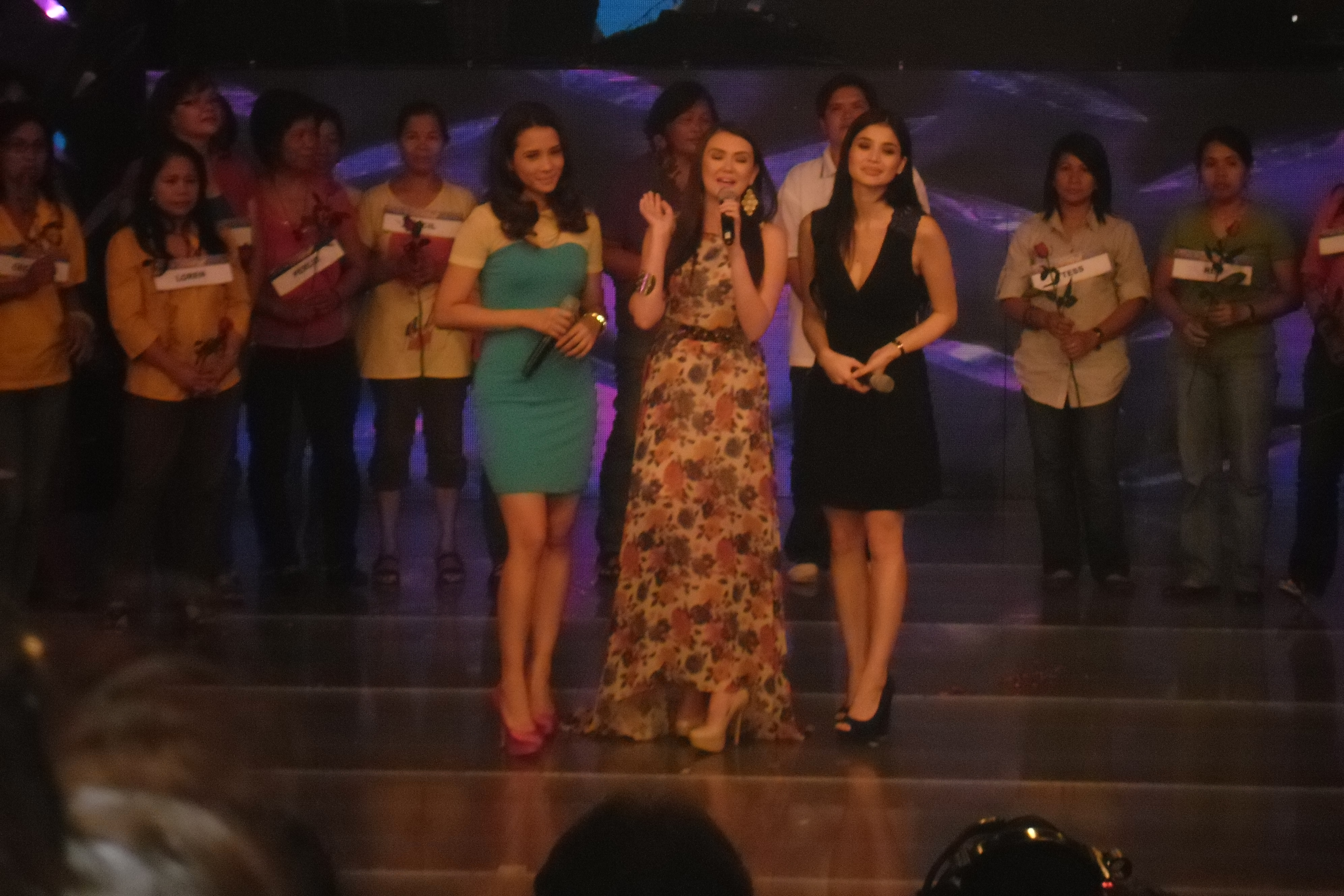
Angelica Panganiban portrays Stephanie/Stef.

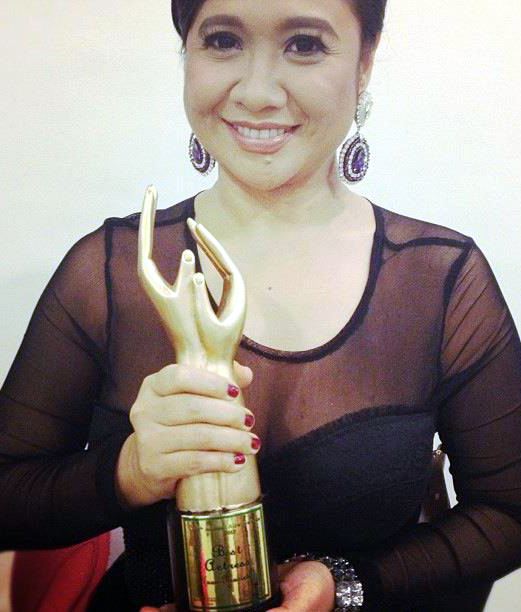
Eugene Domingo portrays Precy

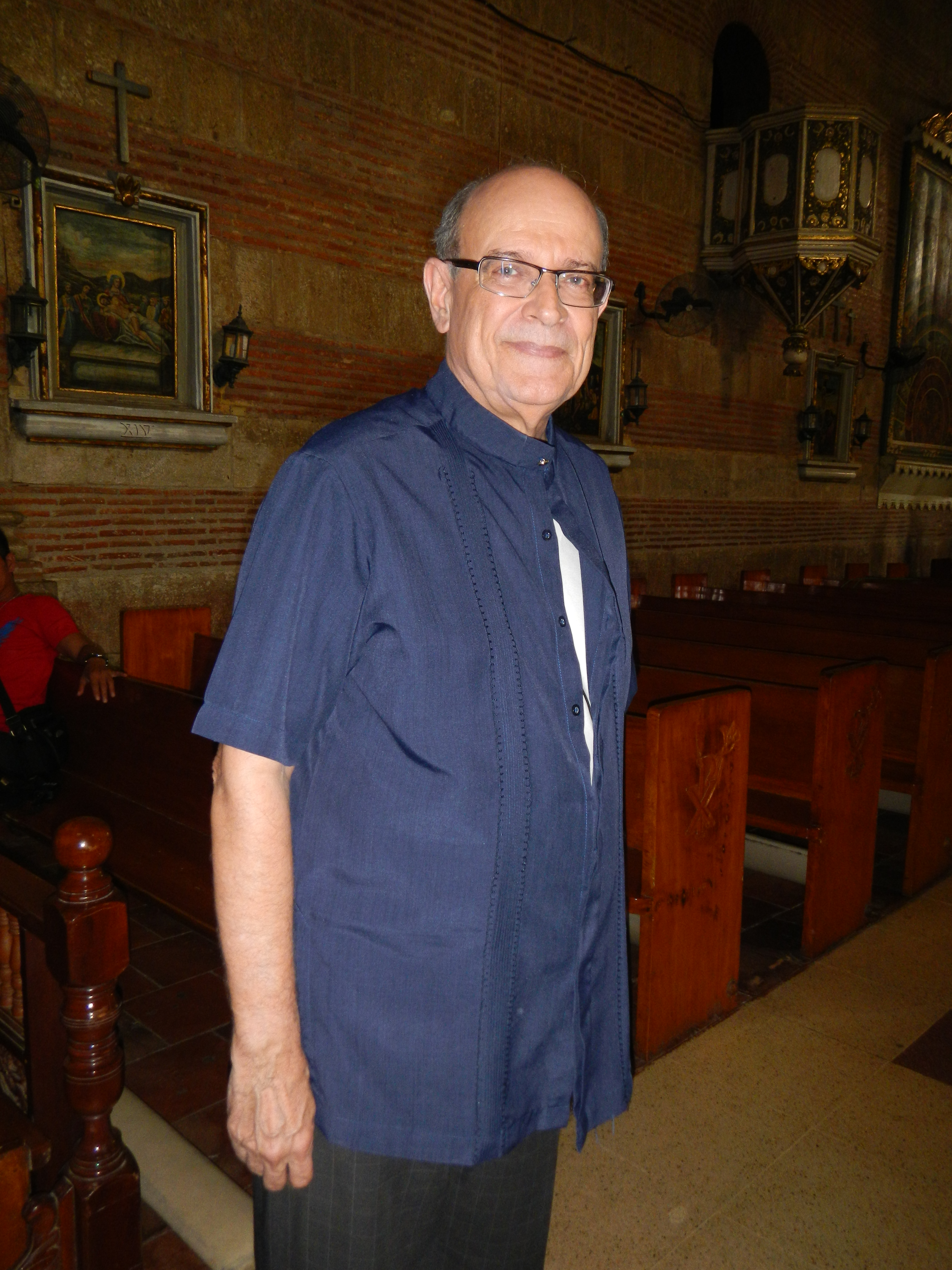
Jaime Fabregas portrays Bien.

- Angelica Panganiban as Stephanie/Stef, the conservative, shy bride who has saved her virginity for soon-to-be husband. (switched to Precy's body)
- Eugene Domingo as Precy, a feisty, middle-aged, single lawyer, and Stephanie's godmother. (switched to Medelyn's body)
- John Lapus as Toffee, a love-torn image stylist and part of the wedding's hair and makeup team. (switched to Stephanie's body)
- Tuesday Vargas as Medelyn, an overworked nanny who takes care of the bratty kid, Iñaki. (switched to Lolo Bien's body)
- Jaime Fabregas as Bien, the groom's rich and sickly but hypersexual grandfather of Harold.(switched to Toffee's body)
- Tom Rodriguez as Harold, the groom.
- Cherry Pie Picache as Doris, the mother of the bride.
- Cai Cortez as Mariz, Stephanie's high school best friend and the maid of honor. She is enamored by and later marries Bien.
- Timothy Chan as Iñaki, Medelyn's bratty charge and the wedding's ring bearer.
- Ayen Munji-Laurel as Iñaki's mother
- Neil Ryan Sese as Iñaki's father
- Nico Antonio as Ding, Medelyn's, and later Precy's, suitor
- Kim Atienza as himself (Kuya Kim). He helped the characters return to their own bodies.
- Ricky Rivero† as a makeup and hairstyling associate of Toffee
- Ricci Chan as a makeup and hairstyling associate of Toffee
- Johnny Revilla as Antonio, Bien's older son and Harold's father
- Bart Guingona as Rafael, Bien's younger son and Harold's uncle
- Madeleine Nicolas as Linda, Precy's housekeeper
- Cecil Paz as Bien's nurse
- Thess Antonio as Vanessa, the wedding coordinator

== Reception ==
=== Critical response ===
The movie received positive reviews from viewers and critics. Philbert Ortiz Dy of ClickTheCity gave the film 4 stars out of 5, stating: "Here Comes the Bride is one of the best comedies I’ve seen all year." ReelAdvice rate the film 4.5/5 saying, "Very, very funny. We can bet that you won’t be able to count the number of times you’ll laugh out loud" the site also praise the cast stating," talented powerhouse cast was really brilliant."

=== Box office ===
Its first day gross totaled to ₱12 million, according to a report on SNN: Showbiz News Ngayon. According to Box Office Mojo, the film had grossed P42.1 million on its weekend debut, beating Iron Man 2 in Philippine Box-Office. The film's fifth week debut totaled to P117 million.

=== Awards ===
| Year | Award-Giving Body | Category | Recipient | Result |
|---|---|---|---|---|
| 2011 | GMMSF Box-Office Entertainment Awards | Most Popular Screenwriter | Chris Martinez | Won |
| 2011 | GMMSF Box-Office Entertainment Awards | Comedy Actor of the Year | John Lapus | Won |
| 2011 | GMMSF Box-Office Entertainment Awards | Comedy Actress of the Year | Angelica Panganiban | Won |

== Standalone sequel ==
In 2023, Quantum Films announced a sequel, titled Here Comes the Groom as an entry in the first Metro Manila Summer Film Festival, which was released on April 8. The film retains Eugene Domingo, Nico Antonio and Kim Atienza from the first film.
