= Carlo Aquino =

Filipino actor and musician (born 1985)

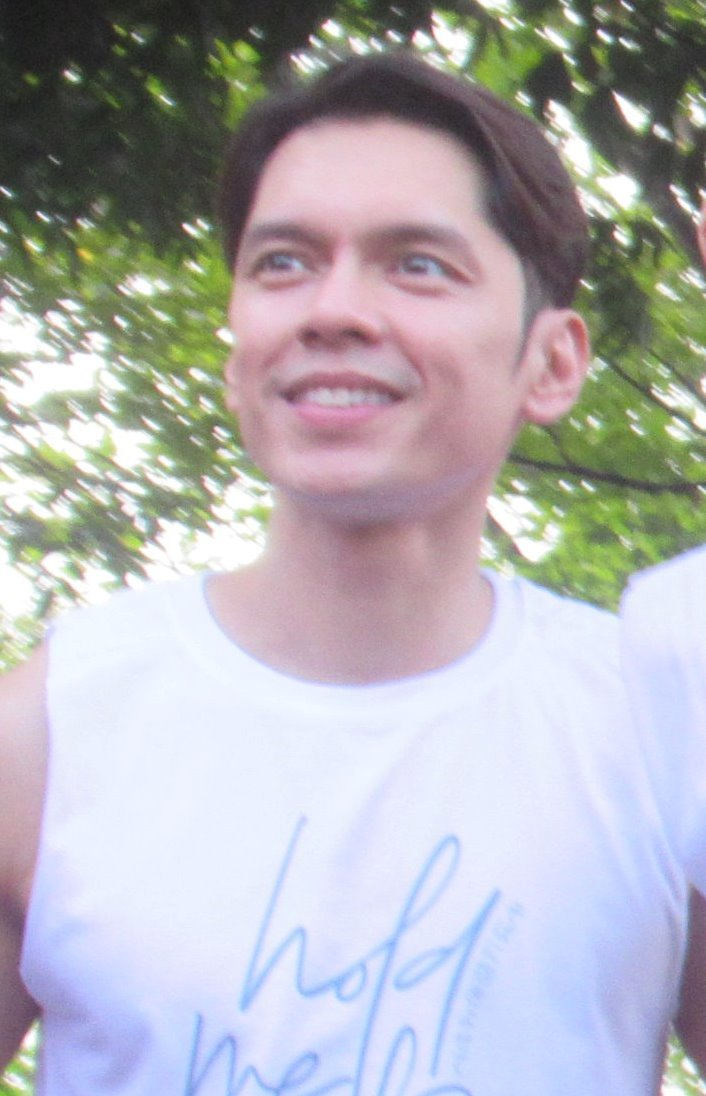
- Aquino in 2024
- Born: Carlo Jose Liwanag Aquino; September 3, 1985 (age 41); Quezon City, Philippines
- Occupations: Actor, singer
- Years active: 1992–present
- Agents: Star Magic (1992–2006; 2012–2025) Viva Artist Agency (2005–2011; 2025–present) Sparkle GMA Artist Center (2006–2011); Talent5 (now Star Worx) (2011–2012)
- Height: 1.63 m (5 ft 4 in)
- Spouse: Charlie Dizon (m. 2024)
- Children: 1
- Musical career
- Genres: Pop; OPM
- Instruments: Vocals; guitar
- Years active: 2000–present
- Labels: Star Music (2000); Ivory Music and Video (2019–present)

Carlo Jose Liwanag Aquino (born September 3, 1985) is a Filipino actor and musician known for being the lead singer of the band Kollide and formerly of JCS with John Prats and Stefano Mori. Aquino achieved critical recognition for his performance in the 1998 film Bata, Bata... Pa'no Ka Ginawa? with veteran actress Vilma Santos based on the award-winning novel by Lualhati Bautista.

== Early life and career ==
Carlo Jose Liwanag Aquino was born on September 3, 1985, in Quezon City, Philippines to parents Jose and Amelia Aquino (née Liwanag), the youngest of three siblings. He started his show business career as a child actor and rose to popularity as a teen actor during the late 1990s and early 2000s. Formerly an exclusive contract star of ABS-CBN's Star Magic, he also appeared in some shows of rival stations GMA Network as a contract artist under GMA Artist Center (now Sparkle GMA Artist Center) and TV5 also as a contract artist under Talent5 (now Star Worx). As of 2012, he currently exclusively worked for ABS-CBN again.

In 2018, Aquino and Panganiban teamed up again on-screen with the romantic comedy-drama film, Exes Baggage.

== Personal life ==
Aquino dated former on-screen love team Angelica Panganiban during their teens and remained friends after their break-up. He previously dated Camille Prats and Maja Salvador.

Aquino was in a relationship with model and influencer Trina Candaza from January 2019 until December 2022. With Candaza, Aquino welcomed his first daughter, Enola Mithi, on September 13, 2020.

In 2023, actress Charlie Dizon confirmed she was in a relationship with Aquino. On June 9, 2024, he and Dizon married at a private resort in Silang, Cavite.

== Filmography ==
=== Film ===
Year	Title	Role
1996	Cedie	Ray
1996	Ang TV The Movie: The Adarna Adventure	
1996	Magic Temple	Young Jubal
1997	Kokey	Bong
1997	I Do, I Die! Dyos Ko Day	Carlo Mendiola
1998	Bata, Bata... Pa'no Ka Ginawa?	Ojie
1998	Hiling	Rolly
1999	Kahapon, May Dalawang Bata	Marlito
1999	Alyas Pogi: Ang Pagbabalik	Paris
2000	Daddy O! Baby O!	Odi
2000	Sugatang Puso	Sonny
2001	Minsan May Isang Puso	Boyet Palacios
2001	Bagong Buwan	Rashid
2002	Jologs	Party Guest
2003	Ang Tanging Ina	Dimitri "Tri" Montecillo
2004	Mano Po III: My Love	Young Michael
2005	Sa Aking Pagkagising Mula sa Kamulatan (Awaken "US release")	Rey
2005	Tuli	Nanding
2008	Carnivore	Lino Lucero
2008	Baler	Gabriel Reyes
2008	Ang Tanging Ina Ninyong Lahat	Dimitri "Tri" Montecillo
2009	Nandito Ako Nagmamahal Sa'Yo	Maga Flores
2010	Working Girls	Tobs
2010	Mahilig	
2010	White House	Benjie
2010	Ang Tanging Ina Mo Rin (Last na 'To!)	Dimitri "Tri" Montecillo
2011	Tumbok	Ronnie
2011	I-Libings	JC
2011	Enteng Ng Ina Mo	Dimitri "Tri" Montecillo
2012	Diablo	
2012	Amorosa: The Revenge	Jerry
2012	Mater Dolorosa	
2012	Shake, Rattle & Roll 14	Rex Dolorosa
2013	Death March	Claudio
2013	Porno	Alex
2013	Alamat ni China Doll	Antonio
2015	Heneral Luna	Col. Vicente Enriquez
2016	Always Be My Maybe	Fred
2016	Dyamper	Apeng
2017	Bar Boys	Erik Vicencio
2017	Throwback Today	Primo Jose Lacson
2018	Meet Me in St. Gallen	Jesse Abaya
2018	Goyo: Ang Batang Heneral	Col. Vicente Enriquez
2018	Exes Baggage	Nix
2019	Ulan	Peter
2019	Isa Pa with Feelings	Gali
2022	Expensive Candy	Renato Camaya
2023	I Love Lizzy	Jeff
2023	Seasons	Kurt
2023	Third World Romance	Alvin
2023	Iti Mapukpukaw	Eric
2023	Love You Long Time	Uly
2024	Whispers in the Wind	Ren
2024	Crosspoint	Manuel Hidalgo
2024	Hold Me Close	Woody
2025	The Time That Remains	Matias
2025	Bar Boys: After School	Atty. Erik Vicencio
2026	A Special Memory	Dindo

=== Television ===
Year	Title	Role
1997–2004	Wansapanataym: Tres Marias	
1997–2004	Wansapanataym: Prinsipe Patrick	
1997–2004	Wansapanataym: Peyritels	
1997–2004	Wansapanataym: Flashing Gordon	Louie
1997–2004	Wansapanataym: Abrakadabra	
1997–2004	Wansapanataym: Madyik Kaldero	
1997–2004	Wansapanataym: Mall Alone	Badong
1997–2004	Wansapanataym: Wake Up, Little Rosie, Wake Up	
1997–2004	Wansapanataym: Carancal: Ang Bayaning Sang Dangkal	
1997–2004	Wansapanataym: Ang Wish ko ay Sumapit	
1992–1995	Ang TV	Himself
1993–2001	Star Drama Presents	
1995–1996	Familia Zaragoza	Miguel Lagrimas
1995–2006; 2012–present	ASAP	Himself
1995–1998	Kaybol (Ang Bagong TV)	Himself
1998–1999	Cyberkada	Himself
1999–2002	G-mik	Justin "Jun–Jun" Dela Cruz
2000–2001	Pahina	Baltazar "Balt" Gonzales
2001–2002	Sa Puso Ko Iingatan Ka	Eman dela Cruz
2001	Maalaala Mo Kaya: Volleyball	Reuben
2001	Karen's World	Farmer Boy
2002–2003	Berks	Aries
2003	Maalaala Mo Kaya: Garapon	Christopher "Toper" Robles
2003	Ang Tanging Ina	Dimitri "Tri" Montecillo
2004–2005	Krystala	Giwal
2005	Ganda ng Lola Ko	Guest
2005–2006	My Guardian Abby	Larry
2006	Bituing Walang Ningning	Norman "Oman" Fidel Gonzales
2006	Your Song Presents: Perslab	Chris dela Cuesta
2006	Your Song Presents: Ikaw Pa Rin	Abel
2006	Maynila	Nestor
2006–2007	Makita Ka Lang Muli	Leo
2007	Your Song Presents: Carry My Love	Francis
2007	Sine Novela: Sinasamba Kita	Oscar
2007	SiS	Himself
2007	Mga Kuwento ni Lola Basyang: Ang Kastilyong Bakal	Prinsipe Agaton
2008	Sine Novela: Maging Akin Ka Lamang	Ernie Balboa
2008	Rakista	Caloy Eugenio
2009	Totoy Bato	Teen Totoy
2009	Daisy Siete	Larry
2009	Sine Novela: Dapat Ka Bang Mahalin?	Philippe "Phil" Bautista
2009–2010	Sine Novela: Tinik Sa Dibdib	Ruden
2010	Panday Kids	Elvin
2010	Diva	Joe
2011	Ang Utol Kong Hoodlum	Ethan
2012	Wansapanataym: Ang Monito Ni Monica	Pungkoy
2012	Maalaala Mo Kaya: Pulang Laso	Kevin
2013	Carlo J. Caparas' Dugong Buhay	teen Simon Bernabe
2013	Maalaaala Mo Kaya: Rosas	Fred
2013–2014	Annaliza	Marcus "Makoy" Diaz
2014	Maalaala Mo Kaya: Lipstick	Andres
2014	Ipaglaban Mo: Kaya Ba Kitang Itakwil?	Florante
2014	Maalaala Mo Kaya: Wedding Gown	Hazzy Go
2014	Dream Dad	young Eliseo Javier
2014	Give Love on Christmas: The Gift Giver	Eric Aguinaldo
2015	FlordeLiza	Arnold Magsakay
2015	Ipaglaban Mo: Buhay Mo o Buhay Ko?	Samuel
2015	Wansapanataym: Kenny Kaliwete	SPO1 Carlos
2016	We Will Survive	Pocholo Rustia
2016	FPJ's Ang Probinsyano	Marlon Aguilar
2016	Ipaglaban Mo: Witness	Kevin
2017	Maalaala Mo Kaya: Makeup	Mike
2017	The Better Half	Marco Saison
2018–2019	Playhouse	Dr. Harold Miguel
2019	Bagman (Season 2)	Emman
2019	Daddy's Gurl	Marco
2020	A Soldier's Heart	Abraham "Abe" Kamlun
2020–2022	La Vida Lena	Jordan Cabrera
2022	How to Move On in 30 Days	Franco Sibayan
2023	Comedy Island Philippines	Himself
2023	Kung Hindi Lang Tayo Sumuko	Benedict
2025	It's Okay to Not Be Okay	Matthew "Matmat" Gonzales

== Accolades ==
Awards and NominationsAwards and nominations received by Carlo Aquino
Award	Year	Category	Nominated work	Result	Ref.
Asian Academy Creative Awards	2019	Best Actor in a Leading Role (Note: Regional)	Ulan	Won	
32nd Box Office Entertainment Awards	2002	Prince of RP Movies	Minsan May Isang Puso	Won	
Cinemanila International Film Festival	2008	Best Actor	Carnivore	Won	
Cinema One Originals Digital Film Festival	2017	Best Actor	Throwback Today	Nominated	
The EDDYS	2019	Best Actor	Exes Baggage	Nominated	
The EDDYS	2026	Best Actor	Bar Boys: After School	Nominated	
8th EdukCircle Awards	2018	Best Actor (Single Drama Performance)	Maalaala Mo Kaya: Magnifying Glass	Won	
FACINE Filipino International Cine Festival	2018	Best Actor	Meet Me in St. Gallen	Won	
FAMAS Awards	1999	Best Child Actor	Bata, Bata... Pa'no Ka Ginawa?	Won	
FAMAS Awards	2000	Best Child Actor	Kahapon, May Dalawang Bata	Nominated	
FAMAS Awards	2011	Best Supporting Actor	Ang Tanging Ina Mo (Last na 'To!)	Nominated	
FAMAS Awards	2019	Best Actor	Exes Baggage	Nominated	
Gawad Urian Award	1999	Best Supporting Actor	Bata, Bata... Pa'no Ka Ginawa?	Nominated	
Gawad Urian Award	2000	Best Actor	Kahapon, May Dalawang Bata	Nominated	
Gawad Urian Award	2002	Best Actor	Minsan May Isang Puso	Nominated	
Gawad Urian Award	2006	Best Actor	Sa Aking Pagkakagising Mula sa Kamulatan	Nominated	
Gawad Urian Award	2013	Best Supporting Actor	Mater Dolorosa	Nominated	
Gawad Urian Award	2014	Best Supporting Actor	Porno	Nominated	
Gawad Urian Award	2019	Best Actor	Meet Me in St. Gallen	Nominated	
Gawad Urian Award	2024	Best Actor	Third World Romance	Nominated	
Gawad Urian Award	2025	Best Actor	Crosspoint	Nominated	
Gawad Urian Award	2026	Best Actor	Bar Boys: After School	Won (Note: Tied with Jericho Rosales.)	
Golden Screen Awards	2006	Best Performance by an Actor in a Leading Role (Drama)	Sa Aking Pagkakagising Mula sa Kamulatan	Won	
Golden Screen Awards	2009	Best Performance by an Actor in a Leading Role (Drama)	Carnivore	Nominated	
Golden Screen TV Awards	2014	Outstanding Performance by an Actor in a Single Drama	Maalaala Mo Kaya: Pulang Laso	Nominated	
Luna Awards	1999	Best Supporting Actor	Bata, Bata... Pa'no Ka Ginawa?	Won	
Luna Awards	2000	Best Supporting Actor	Kahapon, May Dalawang Bata	Nominated	
Luna Awards	2019	Best Supporting Actor	Goyo: Ang Batang Heneral	Nominated	
Luna Awards	2024	Best Actor	Third World Romance	Nominated	
Luna Awards	2026	Best Actor	Bar Boys: After School	Pending	
Metro Manila Film Festival	2025	Best Actor	Bar Boys: After School	Nominated	
PMPC Star Awards for Movies	1999	Child Performer of the Year	Bata, Bata... Pa'no Ka Ginawa?	Won	
PMPC Star Awards for Movies	2002	Best Supporting Actor	Bagong Buwan	Won	
PMPC Star Awards for Movies	2009	Movie Actor of the Year	Carnivore	Nominated	
PMPC Star Awards for Movies	2013	Movie Supporting Actor of the Year	Mater Dolorosa	Won	
PMPC Star Awards for Movies	2019	Movie Love Team of the Year	Exes Baggage	Nominated (Note: Shared with Angelica Panganiban.)	
PMPC Star Awards for Movies	2021	Movie Actor of the Year	Isa Pa with Feelings	Nominated	
PMPC Star Awards for Movies	2021	Movie Love Team of the Year	Ulan	Nominated (Note: Shared with Nadine Lustre.)	
PMPC Star Awards for Movies	2021	Movie Love Team of the Year	Isa Pa with Feelings	Nominated (Note: Shared with Maine Mendoza.)	
PMPC Star Awards for Movies	2024	Movie Love Team of the Year	Expensive Candy	Nominated (Note: Shared with Julia Barretto.)	
PMPC Star Awards for Movies	2024	Movie Love Team of the Year	Third World Romance	Nominated (Note: Shared with Charlie Dizon.)	
PMPC Star Awards for Television	2003	Best Single Performance by an Actor	Tanging Yaman, The Series: Sa Kandungan Mo Inay	Won	
PMPC Star Awards for Television	2006	Best Single Performance by an Actor	Maalaala Mo Kaya: Scapular	Won	
PMPC Star Awards for Television	2013	Best Drama Supporting Actor	Annaliza	Nominated	
PMPC Star Awards for Television	2013	Best Single Performance by an Actor	Maalaala Mo Kaya: Pulang Laso	Won	
PMPC Star Awards for Television	2014	Best Single Performance by an Actor	Maalaala Mo Kaya: Wedding Gown	Nominated	
PMPC Star Awards for Television	2015	Best Supporting Actor	Flordeliza	Nominated	
PMPC Star Awards for Television	2016	Best Drama Supporting Actor	We Will Survive	Nominated	
PMPC Star Awards for Television	2017	Best Drama Actor	The Better Half	Nominated	
Summer Metro Manila Film Festival	2023	Best Actor	Love You Long Time	Nominated	
Young Critics Circle	2002	Best Performance by Male or Female, Adult or Child, Individual or Ensemble in Leading or Supporting Role	Minsan May Isang Puso	Nominated	
Young Critics Circle	2009	Best Performance by Male or Female, Adult or Child, Individual or Ensemble in Leading or Supporting Role	Baler	Nominated	
Young Critics Circle	2013	Best Performance by an Ensemble	Porno	Nominated	
Young Critics Circle	2013	Best Performance	Porno	Won	
