= KaladKaren =

Filipino actress and television personality (born 1992)

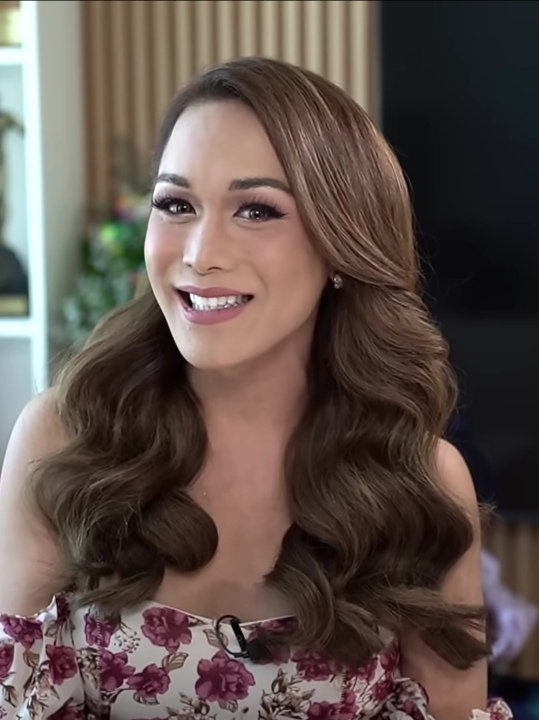
- Kaladkaren in 2025
- Born: Jervi Ryan Lisaba; August 9, 1992 (age 34)
- Other names: Jervi Li; KaladKaren Davila; Jervi Wrightson
- Education: University of the Philippines Diliman (BA)
- Occupations: Actor; news anchor; host
- Years active: 2011–present
- Agent: Star Magic (2023–present)
- Known for: First transgender news presenter in the Philippines
- Spouse: Luke Wrightson (m. 2024)
- Website: KaladKaren on Instagram

Jervi Wrightson (born Jervi Ryan Lisaba; August 9, 1992), also known as Jervi Li and better known by her stage name KaladKaren, is a Filipino actress, news anchor and celebrity impersonator. She is the first transgender woman news anchor in the country and the first transgender woman to win 'Best Supporting Actress' at the Summer Metro Manila Film Festival.

== Education ==
Jervi graduated from the University of the Philippines Diliman in Quezon City with magna cum laude honors and obtained a bachelor's degree in broadcast communication.

== Career ==
In 2012, Wrightson (credited as Jervi Li) and Saida Diola formed Team Amigas on the series The Amazing Race Philippines 1 on TV5. The team placed 5th after being eliminated in Boracay.

=== TV host and personality career ===
In 2016, Wrightson impersonated Karen Davila in the Philippine presidential election, as part of a political satire event led by UP Diliman. She would be known as KaladKaren due to her portrayal, a humorous pun combining "Karen" and Tagalog kaladkarin (meaning "someone who gets persuaded easily into joining activities", literally "[something] dragged along").

She co-hosted the morning talk show of ABS-CBN's Umagang Kay Ganda and presented Pilipinas Got Talent Exclusives, The Voice Kids Digi TV, The Voice Teens Digi TV and Trabahanap. She was also a mainstay of the program I Can See Your Voice and served as a resident judge on Drag Race Philippines.

In June 2023, she joined Frontline Pilipinas on TV5 as a presenter for the Showbiz and Trivia segment, using the screen name "KaladKaren".

=== Acting career ===
In 2011, Wrightson (credited as Jervi Li) appeared in the GMA's comedy horror anthology Spooky Nights: Bampirella along with stars Marian Rivera, Mikael Daez, and Gelli de Belen.

In 2023, Wrightson would act in Here Comes the Groom which premiered at the 2023 Summer Metro Manila Film Festival. In the film, she portrayed Wilhelmina who was also a trans woman like herself. Her character switched bodies with Junior, the protagonist which was portrayed by Enchong Dee hence she had to act like a man for parts of the film to fulfill the role. She won the best supporting actress award in the festival, becoming the first trans woman to win the said award and second to win in an actress category award in the Philippine film industry after Iyah Mina in 2018.

After her marriage in September 2024, Wrightson changed her screen name from Kaladkaren to her real name, Jervi Wrightson, during an announcement on Frontline Pilipinas.

She appeared in the iWantTFC miniseries such as Drag You & Me and Fit Check and is played by herself to make a supporting character was denoted by a cameo appearance in the drama-suspense thriller miniseries, Fractured, along with co-stars by Francine Diaz, Seth Fedelin, Jeremiah Lisbo, Kaori Oinuma, Raven Rigor, Sean Tristan, and Daniela Stranner.

== Personal life ==
Wrightson is an advocate of LGBTQ rights. She got engaged to boyfriend Luke Wrightson in 2020. On September 8, 2024, the two got married in Scarborough, North Yorkshire, United Kingdom.

== Filmography ==
=== Television ===
Year	Title	Role
2011	Spooky Nights: Bampriella	Megan Pak
2012	The Amazing Race Philippines 1	Herself
2017	Pasada Sais Trenta	Herself / Guest
2017–2019	Gandang Gabi, Vice!	Guest
2018–2020	Umagang Kay Ganda	Co-host
2019	Banana Sundae	Herself
2019–2021	I Can See Your Voice	Herself / SINGvestigator
2022	It's Showtime	Jury
2022–present	Drag Race Philippines	Herself / Judge
2022–present	BalitaOneNan	KaladKaren Dadilat
2023	Headstart with Karen Davila	Herself / Guest
2023	TV Patrol	Herself / Guest Segment Anchor "Star Patrol"
2023	Family Feud	Herself/Guest
2023	Drag You & Me	Gerardo Pallan / Miranda Kalaw-Forbes
2023	Fit Check	Barbie
2023	Fractured	Herself
2023	E.A.T.	Herself / Segment Co-Host
2023–present	Frontline Pilipinas	Herself / Segment Anchor "Showbiz Eto Na Nga" and "K-alaman" (as Jervi Wrightson)
2024	It's Showtime	Herself / Guest Performer
2025	Rainbow Rumble	Herself / Contestant
2026	Come Dine With Me: Celebrity Philippines	Host
2026	Drag Race Philippines: Slaysian Royale †	Judge

=== Radio ===
Year	Title	Role
2017	Pasada Sais Trenta	Herself / Guest
2023	Ang Tinig N'yo	Guest Co-host

=== Film ===
Year	Title	Role
2017	Gandarrapiddo: The Revenger Squad	KaladKaren Davila (reporter)
2018	Kusina Kings	KaladKaren Davila (Reporter), host of Kusina King Challenge/herself
2018	The Girl in the Orange Dress	Ogie
2019	The Mall, the Merrier!	KaladKaren Davila (reporter)
2020	Mang Kepweng: Ang Lihim ng Bandanang Itim	KaladKaren Davila (reporter)
2023	Here Comes the Groom	Wilhelmina Wilwayco
2025	Flower Girl	Trans Fairy
2025	Warla	Joice
2025	Unmarry	Lizzie

=== Other credits ===
- Eat Bulaga (GMA, 2009–2012) - Writer (Note: Credited as Jervi Lisaba.)
- The Amazing Race Philippines 2 (TV5, 2014) - Writer

== Awards and nominations ==
Year	Work	Award	Category	Result	Source
2023	Here Comes the Groom	1st Summer Metro Manila Film Festival	Best Supporting Actress	Won	
