= Kahit Maputi Na ang Buhok Ko (film) =

Kahit Maputi Na ang Buhok Ko: The Music of Rey Valera
- Theatrical release poster
- Directed by: Joven Tan
- Written by: Joven Tan; Ferdie Aboga
- Produced by: Edith R. Fider; Greg Serrano
- Starring: RK Bagatsing
- Cinematography: Tejay Gonzales
- Edited by: Jason Cahapay
- Music by: Sherwin Castillo
- Production company: Saranggola Media Productions
- Release date: April 8, 2023
- Country: Philippines
- Language: Filipino

Kahit Maputi Na ang Buhok Ko: The Music of Rey Valera (transl. Even though My Hair is White) is a 2023 Philippine biographical musical film revolving around the life of Filipino musician Rey Valera. It is directed by Joven Tan under Saranggola Media Productions and stars RK Bagatsing.

== Cast ==
- RK Bagatsing as Rey Valera:
  Bagatsing was not the first choice actor to portray the role of the musician. As preparation for the portrayal, he studied YouTube clips of Valera, his concerts, and his interviews. He intentionally did not meet with Valera prior to filming to avoid giving in to pressure and "commit major acting mistakes".

=== Supporting Cast ===
- Rosanna Roces as Lita

The film also features Aljur Abrenica, Rico Barrera, Gelli de Belen, Josh de Guzman, Christopher de Leon, Lotlot de Leon, Jenine Desiderio, Meg Imperial, Ronnie Lazaro, Gian Magdangal, Carlo Mendoza, Ara Mina, Arlene Muhlach, Pekto Nacua, Eric Nicolas, Dennis Padilla, Epy Quizon, Biboy Ramirez, Arman Reyes, Ariel Rivera, Ricky Revero, Lloyd Samartino, Shira Tweg, Lou Veloso, and Gardo Versoza. Rivero portrayed the role of Ike Lozada.

== Production ==
Kahit Maputi Na ang Buhok Ko which serves as biopic for Filipino musician Rey Valera was produced under Saranggola Media Productions. It was directed by Joven Tan, who also wrote the script for the film. Valera himself played a role in the creation of the film. Valera relayed that the film was created to fulfill the request of comedian Ike Lozada, who has already died. Valera also informed Tan of an existence of a book which could be used as material for the film.

== Music ==
Kahit Maputi Na ang Buhok Ko uses various music by Rey Valera himself including the song of the same name. It also featured among others: "Walang Kapalit," "Maging Sino Ka Man," "Kung Kailangan Mo Ako," "Pangako," "Ako si Superman," "Mr. DJ," "Tayong Dalawa," and "Malayo Pa ang Umaga".

== Release ==
Kahit Maputi Na ang Buhok Ko screened in cinemas in the Philippines as one of the eight official entries of the 2023 Metro Manila Summer Film Festival which began on April 8, 2023.

== Accolades ==
Accolades received by Single Bells
Award	Date of ceremony	Category	Recipient(s)	Result	Ref.
2023 Metro Manila Summer Film Festival	April 11, 2023	Best Supporting Actor	Ariel Rivera	Nominated	
2023 Metro Manila Summer Film Festival	April 11, 2023	Best Float	Kahit Maputi Na ang Buhok Ko	Nominated	
