= Love You Long Time =

- Theatrical release poster
- Directed by: JP Habac
- Written by: Gena Tenaja
- Produced by: Lester Pimentel; Henson Lee; Myleen Ongkiko
- Starring: Carlo Aquino; Eisel Serrano
- Edited by: Froilan Francia
- Production company: Studio Three Sixty
- Distributed by: Silver Line Multi Media
- Release date: April 8, 2023
- Country: Philippines
- Language: Filipino

Love You Long Time is a 2023 Philippine romantic drama film directed by JP Habac under Studio Three Sixty starring Carlo Aquino and Eisel Serrano. The film revolves around the interaction of two characters in two different timelines via two-way radios.

== Cast ==
- Carlo Aquino as Uly
- Eisel Serrano as Ikay; a romance screenwriter

Other cast members include Ana Abad Santos, Meanne Espinosa, Juan Miguel Severo, Arlene Muhlach and Patrick Quiroz.

== Production ==
Love You Long Time is directed by JP Habac and written by Gena Tenaja. Set in Baguio and Atok, Benguet, the film was produced under Studio Three Sixty.

== Release ==
Love You Long Time screened in cinemas in the Philippines as one of the eight official entries of the 2023 Metro Manila Summer Film Festival which began on April 8, 2023.

== Accolades ==
Accolades received by Love You Long Time
Award	Date of ceremony	Category	Recipient(s)	Result	Ref.
2023 Metro Manila Summer Film Festival	April 11, 2023	Best Picture	Love You Long Time	2nd Best Picture	
2023 Metro Manila Summer Film Festival	April 11, 2023	Best Director	JP Habac	Nominated	
2023 Metro Manila Summer Film Festival	April 11, 2023	Best Actor	Carlo Aquino	Nominated	
2023 Metro Manila Summer Film Festival	April 11, 2023	Best Supporting Actress	Ana Abad Santos	Nominated	
2023 Metro Manila Summer Film Festival	April 11, 2023	Best Screenplay	Love You Long Time	Nominated	
2023 Metro Manila Summer Film Festival	April 11, 2023	Best Cinematography	Love You Long Time	Nominated	
2023 Metro Manila Summer Film Festival	April 11, 2023	Best Editing	Love You Long Time	Nominated	
2023 Metro Manila Summer Film Festival	April 11, 2023	Best Sound	Love You Long Time	Nominated	
2023 Metro Manila Summer Film Festival	April 11, 2023	Best Musical Score	Love You Long Time	Nominated	
2023 Metro Manila Summer Film Festival	April 11, 2023	Best Float	Love You Long Time	Won	
