= Single Bells =

2023 Filipino comedy film

- Theatrical release poster
- Directed by: Fifth Solomon
- Written by: Fifth Solomon
- Produced by: Paul Soriano; Mark Victor
- Starring: Alex Gonzaga; Angeline Quinto
- Cinematography: Dom Dycaico
- Edited by: Noah Tonga
- Music by: Jessie Lasaten
- Production companies: TinCan Productions; Black Cap Pictures
- Distributed by: GMA Films
- Release date: April 8, 2023
- Country: Philippines
- Language: Filipino

Single Bells is a 2023 Philippine romantic black comedy film starring Alex Gonzaga and Angeline Quinto. It was directed by Fifth Solomon under TinCan Productions and Black Cap Pictures. Distributed by GMA Pictures.

== Premise ==
Rose Ann (Alex Gonzaga) vows to remain single forever after being stood up by his ex-fiancé on her wedding day and commits to take care of her handicapped mother. Rose Ann later meets her former lover at a radio station she works as a voice talent. The film delves on whether Rose Ann would or would not give the man another chance.

Meanwhile, Rose Mae (Angeline Quinto) is a desperate to be in a romantic relationship. She is a frequent user of dating apps and a frequent attendee of speed dating events. She eventually finds a match but realize that the man may be too good to be true.

Both Rose Ann and Rose Mae would befriend each other and join the Single Bells Organization, a self-love group for people who are single.

== Cast ==
- Alex Gonzaga as Rose Ann
- Angeline Quinto as Rose Mae
- Aljur Abrenica
- Victor Silayan
- Julian Roxas
- Ruby Ruiz
- Leo Bruno
- Papa Jackson

== Production ==
Single Bells was produced under TinCan Productions and Black Cap Pictures. It had Fifth Solomon as its director and writer. Solomon cited his own experience of being single for eight years as one of the inspiration for the film remarking how people often would query him why he is not in a relationship and that that particular relationship status seemingly have a negative connotation in society.

== Release ==
Single Bells premiered in cinemas in the Philippines as one of the eight official entries of the 2023 Metro Manila Summer Film Festival which began on April 8, 2023.

== Accolades ==
Accolades received by Single Bells
Award	Date of ceremony	Category	Recipient(s)	Result	Ref.
2023 Metro Manila Summer Film Festival	April 11, 2023	Best Supporting Actor	Aljur Abrenica	Nominated	
2023 Metro Manila Summer Film Festival	April 11, 2023	Best Float	Single Bells	Nominated	
