= Yung Libro sa Napanood Ko =

- Theatrical release poster
- Directed by: Bela Padilla
- Written by: Bela Padilla
- Produced by: Bela Padilla; Vincent Del Rosario III; Veronique Del Rosario-Corpus
- Starring: Bela Padilla; Yoo Min-Gon
- Cinematography: Rommel Sales
- Edited by: Renard Torres
- Music by: Kean Cipriano
- Production companies: Viva Films; Top Story
- Distributed by: Viva Communications
- Release date: April 8, 2023
- Country: Philippines
- Languages: Filipino; English

Yung Libro sa Napanood Ko (lit. 'The book in the show I watched') is a 2023 Philippine romantic drama film directed by Bela Padilla starring Padilla herself and Yoo Min-Gon.

The film revolves around Lisa (Padilla), a Korean drama fan and writer touring with Yoo Min-Gon, a fan (Yoo) in South Korea.

== Plot ==
Lisa gets inspired to write her own book, after learning that the Korean series she watches, has a book titled To Room 19 and manages to get her own book published. At a book signing event for her book, Lisa was approached by Kim Gun Hoo (Yoo Min-gon), who introduces himself as a big fan of hers.

Before returning to South Korea, Kim visits Lisa again and invites her to join him for an opportunity to see the filming sites of her favorite Korean drama. Lisa accepts and the two go on a tour. Lisa catches a fever and Kim reveals that the two know each other for six years already and the two were already dating.

Lisa recounts her past, remembering that her mother Mary, an overseas Filipino worker, brought her to Korea during her childhood where she had met Kim. Lisa would return to Manila when she grew up. While at work, her father Pio calls her to inform her of her mother's suicide leading to Lisa developing post-traumatic stress disorder and forgets about her prior experiences in Korea.

In the present, the two separates despite Kim's attempts to convince Lisa to stay with him. A year passes, Lisa writes to Kim and asks him to watch an interview of her. It was revealed that Kim served as inspiration for How I Remember You, Lisa's second book, which Kim uses to find Lisa's location. The two reunite with Kim giving her a copy of To Room 19. They promise to remain by each other's side.

== Cast ==
- Bela Padilla as Lisa; a Korean drama enthusiast and book writer.
- Yoo Min-Gon as Kim Gun Hoo; a Korean man who invites Lisa to go to South Korea with him. Padilla cast him three weeks prior to filming, as the leading man for the film. Padilla learned about Yoo through a mutual connection with a Korean actress who worked with her in Ultimate Oppa. Yoo is a Canadian-born Korean and is fluent in speaking English. However, Yoo did not play in English-language films before having portrayed roles only in Korean films prior to Yung Libro sa Napanood Ko.
- Lorna Tolentino as Mary, Lisa's mother. Tolentino has a special participation billing for this film.
- Boboy Garrovillo as Pio, Lisa's father.

== Production ==
Yung Libro sa Napanood Ko was produced under Viva Communications. It was directed, written, and produced by actress Bela Padilla, who also stars in her own film along with Korean actor Yoo Min-Gon. Padilla, an avid K-drama enthusiast herself, was inspired to create a film which has "no contravida (antagonist) but addresses mental health issues" after watching the Korean television series Because This Is My First Life. Aside from the romantic storyline between the two lead characters, the plight of overseas Filipino Workers was also tackled in the film through Lorna Tolentino, who plays the role of Lisa's mother.

A significant part of the film was shot and set in South Korea, while a portion of it was shot in the Philippines. Principal photography for the film began in October 2022.

== Release ==
Yung Libro sa Napanood Ko screened in cinemas in the Philippines as one of the eight official entries of the 2023 Metro Manila Summer Film Festival which began on April 8, 2023.

== Accolades ==
Accolades received by Single Bells
Award	Date of ceremony	Category	Recipient(s)	Result	Ref.
2023 Metro Manila Summer Film Festival	April 11, 2023	Best Actor	Yoo Min-Gon	Nominated	
2023 Metro Manila Summer Film Festival	April 11, 2023	Best Actress	Bela Padilla	Nominated	
2023 Metro Manila Summer Film Festival	April 11, 2023	Best Production Design	Ericson Navarro	Nominated	
2023 Metro Manila Summer Film Festival	April 11, 2023	Best Editing	Renard Torres	Nominated	
2023 Metro Manila Summer Film Festival	April 11, 2023	Best Sound	Aian Caro	Nominated	
2023 Metro Manila Summer Film Festival	April 11, 2023	Best Musical Score	Kean Cipriano	Nominated	
2023 Metro Manila Summer Film Festival	April 11, 2023	Best Float	Yung Libro Sa Napanood Ko	Nominated	
