= Echorsis =

- Directed by: Lemuel Lorca
- Screenplay by: Jerry Gracio
- Produced by: Chris Cahilig
- Starring: John Lapus; Kean Cipriano; Alex Medina
- Edited by: Benjamin Tolentino
- Music by: Jonathan Ong
- Production company: Insight 360 Films
- Release date: 2016
- Running time: 110 min
- Country: Philippines
- Language: Filipino

Echorsis: Sabunutan Between Good and Evil (lit. Echorsis: Hair-pulling Between Good and Evil) or simply Echorsis is a 2016 Philippine supernatural spoof horror film directed by Lemuel Lorca and produced by Chris Cahilig of Insight 360, and stars John Lapus, Kean Cipriano, and Alex Medina. It premiered in cinemas on April 13, 2016.

== Synopsis ==
The film revolves around a gigolo Carlo (Alex Medina), who was possessed by a gay entity after he deceived Kristoff (John Lapus) his closeted gay lover. Father Nick (Kean Cipriano) is then tasked to exorcise the spirit out of Carlo's body.

== Cast ==
=== Main cast ===
- John Lapus as Kristoff
- Alex Medina as Carlo
- Kean Cipriano as Father Nick

=== Supporting cast ===
- Ruby Ruiz as Nanay San
- Chokoleit† as The Devil Gay
- Menggie Cobarrubias as Kristoff's father, a military man
- Odette Khan as Kristoff's mother, a devout Catholic
- Bekimon as Cheng, Kristoff's best friend
- Nico Antonio as Menchu, Kristoff's best friend
- Francine Garcia as Vida, Kristoff's best friend
- Yuki Sakamoto as Mark, Carlo's best friend
- Anjo Resurreccion as The Devil With Abs
- Mich Liggayu as Mariel, Carlo's materialistic girlfriend
- Alessandra de Rossi as Girl Vatuh
- Kiray Celis as the possessed girl
- Toni Co as parish secretary Marlon
- Rob Sy as Tyo Pablo, Nanay Sula's lover
- Raymond Rinoza as Father Silva
- Ces Aldaba as Father Mar

== Production ==
The film was directed by Lemuel Lorca and was produced by Chris Cahilig under the production firm, Insight 360. Jerry Gracio served as writer of the film. Echorsis was described as a parody of The Exorcist.

The concept for Echorsis was created in 2011, when director Lorca and writer Gracio were discussing of a concept for a film in 2011. They were laughing about the concept which revolves around someone being possessed by a gay demon. In 2012 the two became serious about the concept and a script based on it was completed by late 2015. One of the challenges to producing the film was finding a producer to finance the film. The script was sent to Chris Cahilig, a PR specialist who stepped in with financing.

Producer Cahilig described the film as an "out-of-the-box" comedy. On the second day since the film's premiere in cinemas, Cahilig remarked that "Filipino moviegoers are ready for a black comedy such as Echorsis." He also remarked that the box office success of local films, English Only, Please, Heneral Luna, and That Thing Called Tadhana motivated the production team to continue on doing the Echorsis project despite the film's unconventional plot.

Echorsis is Lorca's sixth film and the biggest in terms of budget and was described by the director as a slight "mainstream commercial". The "light" film was a contrast to Lorca's previous indie films which had a more serious mood.

=== Casting ===
Alex Medina plays as the character Carlo, a conman who victimizes gay people. He gets possessed by different gay spirits of those he previously preyed on. According to Medina he was the last person who auditioned for the role. He said that he accepted the role saying that the film is "not a typical gay story" and that Echorsis tackles love and said it's about "acceptance" and tackles many different issues.

Medina commenting on his role as Carlo, a straight man who gets possessed by gay spirits, was challenging which he remarked as physically exhausting since the role demanded him to be flamboyant in selected scenes. He also felt uncomfortable with the bed scenes but remarked that he trusts his colleague Lapus and that he has been friends with Cipriano. Medina also expresses openness in doing other gay roles in future projects.

== Release ==
=== Marketing ===
The trailer for the film was released online in early February 2016. The trailer garnered close to a million views by February 22, 2016. By April 15, 2016, the views garnered by the trailer counted almost 4 million.

=== Theatrical release ===
Echorsis was released in cinemas nationwide in the Philippines on April 13, 2016, a week ahead as originally planned. The film was previously planned to be screened on April 20 but the opening date was moved to an earlier date due to public demand following the release of the film's trailer. The film was rated R13 by the Movie and Television Review and Classification Board.

According to Medina, the film received low turnout on its opening day similar to what Heneral Luna which was momentarily removed from cinema line-up due to poor ticket sales on the first day. He expressed concern that Echorsis might risk being removed from cinema line-ups as well. However Lapus expressed optimism that the film will be patronized in the coming days especially the Filipino LGBT community due to positive comments on the movie trailer. Medina also said that the film's social media campaign was successful.

Echorsis was given a second week in cinemas and was screening in eight cinemas in Market! Market!, Festival Mall, Trinoma, SM Sta. Mesa, Robinsons Galleria, SM North Edsa, SM City Manila and SM Megamall. This is after general cinema attendance was low on the first week of Echorsis' screening even for Hollywood-produced films. This low attendance was attributed by producer Cahillig to the high heat index recorded.

== Reception ==
=== Critical reception ===
Film critic Philbert Dy of ClickTheCity.com described the film as a "subversive little gem" and praised its bold depiction of the LGBT community. He also named the film as the "spiritual successor" of Zombadings. Another critic and writer, Oggs Cruz of Rappler, described the film as doing what it sets out to do which is "entertain while deliberately forwarding a pervasive agenda."

In September 2017, "Echorsis" won the Best Comedy/ Musical Film trophy in the 4th Urduja Heritage Film Awards 2017. The film tied with the critically acclaimed "Die Beautiful" directed by Jun Lana.
