= The Girl in the Orange Dress =

- Theatrical release poster
- Directed by: Jay Abello
- Written by: Jay Abello
- Produced by: Carlo L. Katigbak; Olivia M. Lamasan; Joji Alonso; Edgardo Mangahas; Jericho Vibar Rosales; Jane Torres
- Starring: Jericho Rosales; Jessy Mendiola
- Cinematography: Miguel Cruz
- Edited by: Marya Ignacio
- Music by: Len Calvo; Andrew Florentino
- Production companies: Star Cinema; Quantum Films; MJM Productions
- Distributed by: Star Cinema; Quantum Films
- Release date: December 25, 2018
- Running time: 100 minutes
- Country: Philippines
- Language: Filipino
- Box office: ₱24 million (estimated)

The Girl in the Orange Dress is a 2018 Filipino romantic comedy film written and directed by Jay Abello. The film stars Jericho Rosales and Jessy Mendiola.

A co-production of Star Cinema, Quantum Films, and MJM Productions, the film was theatrically released on December 25, 2018, as an official entry to the 44th Metro Manila Film Festival.

== Synopsis ==
After a night of partying, Anna, a young woman, wakes up in the bed of a famous movie star.

== Cast ==
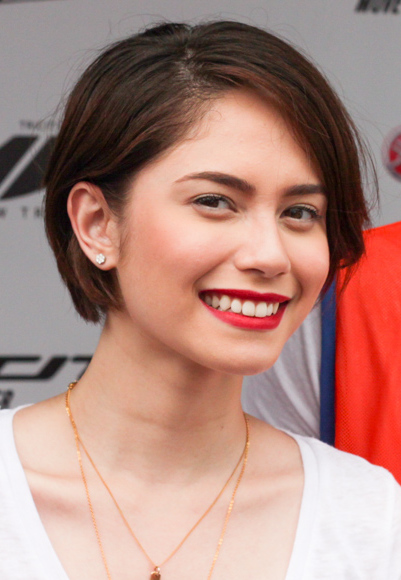
Jessy Mendiola portrays Anna Elizabeth Villegas

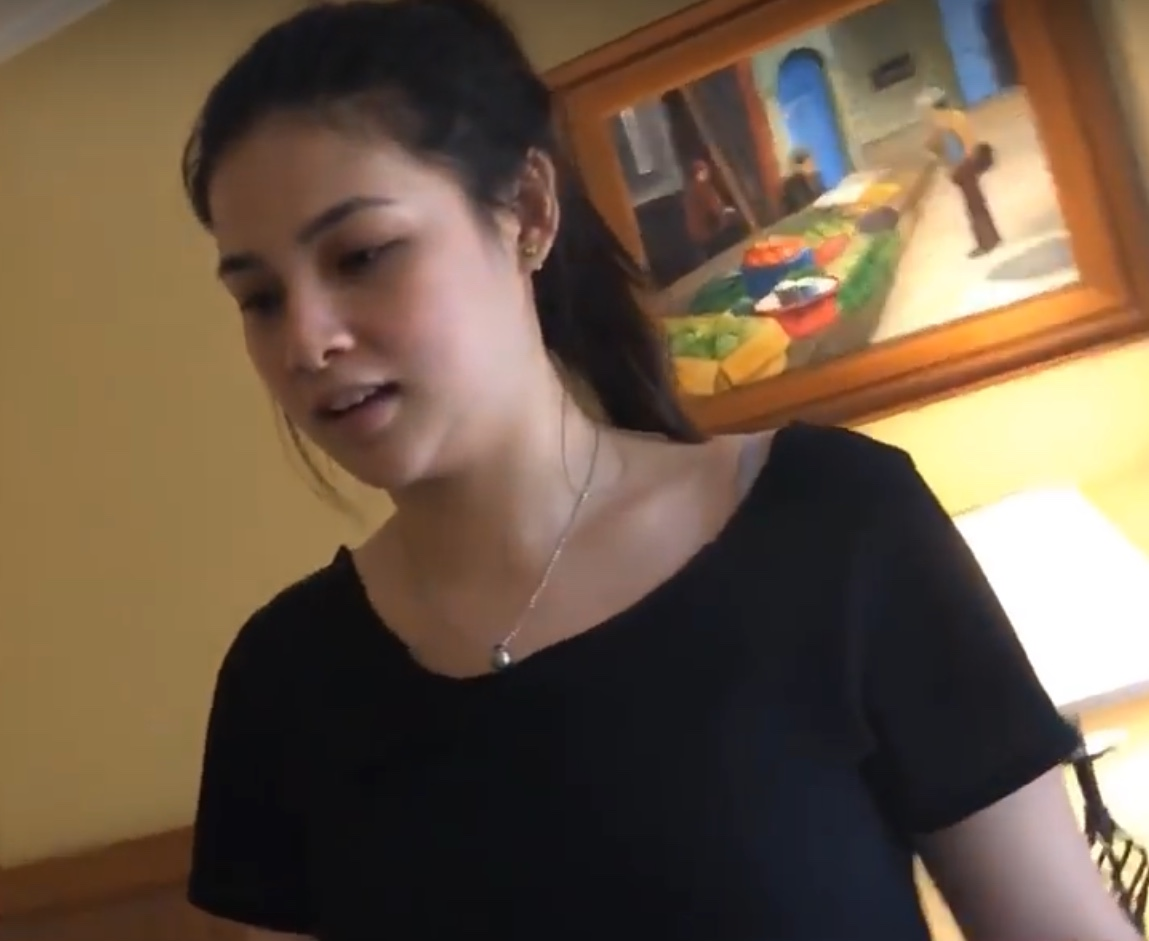
Maika Rivera as Honey

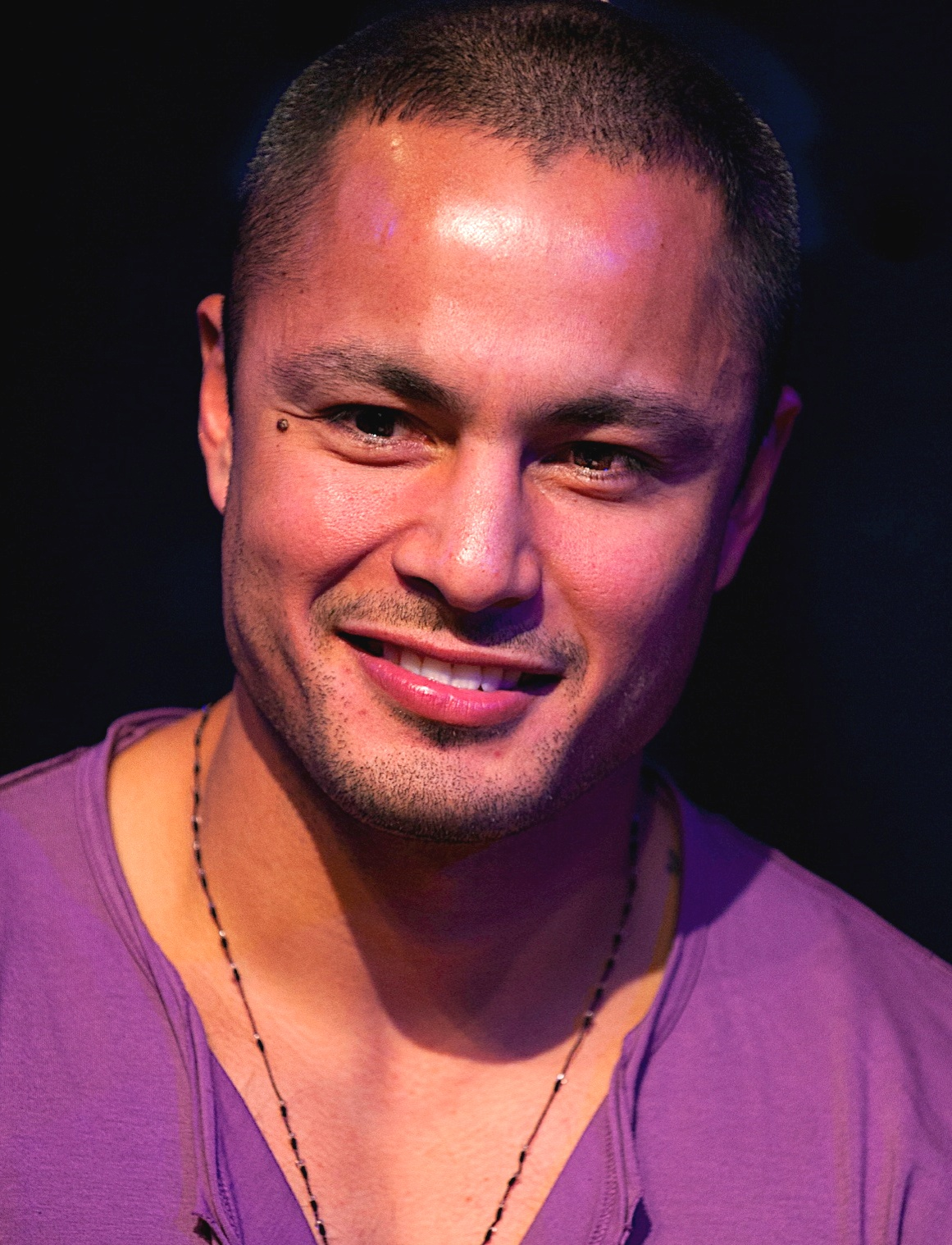
Derek Ramsay as Ethan

=== Main characters ===
- Jericho Rosales as Rye
- Jessy Mendiola as Anna

=== Supporting characters ===
- Ria Atayde as Kakai
- Sheena Halili as Sasha
- Hannah Ledesma as Denise
- Cai Cortez as Rachel
- Thou Reyes as Gino
- Nico Antonio as Julio
- Nicco Manalo as Eric
- Via Antonio as Carol
- Juan Miguel Severo as Macky
- Maika Rivera as Honey
- Jervi Ryan "KaladKaren Davila" Li as Ogie
- Anna Luna as Karen Villegas (Anna's Sister)
- Cheska Iñigo as Betty (Anna's Friend)
- Brian Sy as Jonathan

=== Special participation ===
- Derek Ramsay as Ethan
- Tuesday Vargas as Liberty Su
- KaladKaren as Ogie
- Maxene Magalona as Martha
- Jennylyn Mercado as Agatha
- Luis Manzano as Eric Dela Cruz
- Boy Abunda as himself

== Theme song ==
- "We & Us” by Moira Dela Torre
