= Unravel: A Swiss Side Love Story =

- Theatrical release poster
- Directed by: RC de los Reyes
- Starring: Gerald Anderson; Kylie Padilla
- Production company: Mavx Productions
- Release date: April 8, 2023
- Country: Philippines
- Language: Filipino

Unravel: A Swiss Side Love Story is a 2023 Philippine romantic drama film directed by RC de los Reyes under Mavx Productions starring Gerald Anderson and Kylie Padilla. The film revolves around Lucy (Padilla), a woman who is seeking assisted voluntary death in Switzerland after undergoing a painful divorce and Noah Brocker (Anderson), a man who would convince Lucy to keep living on.

== Cast ==
- Gerald Anderson as Noah Brocker
- Kylie Padilla as Lucy

== Production ==
Unravel was directed by RC de los Reyes under Mavx Productions and was filmed in Switzerland. "Swiss Side" in the film's name is a word play on the concept of suicide, a concept which the film heavily tackles. The film tackles the role of "human connection" in relation to suicide, or more specifically assisted voluntary death (ADV), a process which is legal in Switzerland. It also tackles anxiety and depression.

== Release ==
Unravel screened in cinemas in the Philippines as one of the eight official entries of the 2023 Metro Manila Summer Film Festival which began on April 8, 2023.

== Accolades ==
Accolades received by Unravel: A Swiss Side Love Story
Award	Date of ceremony	Category	Recipient(s)	Result	Ref.
2023 Metro Manila Summer Film Festival	April 11, 2023	Best Actor	Gerald Anderson	Nominated	
2023 Metro Manila Summer Film Festival	April 11, 2023	Best Actress	Kylie Padilla	Nominated	
2023 Metro Manila Summer Film Festival	April 11, 2023	Best Screenplay	Unravel: A Swiss Side Love Story	Nominated	
2023 Metro Manila Summer Film Festival	April 11, 2023	Best Production Design	Unravel: A Swiss Side Love Story	Nominated	
2023 Metro Manila Summer Film Festival	April 11, 2023	Best Cinematography	Unravel: A Swiss Side Love Story	Nominated	
2023 Metro Manila Summer Film Festival	April 11, 2023	Best Sound	Unravel: A Swiss Side Love Story	Nominated	
2023 Metro Manila Summer Film Festival	April 11, 2023	Best Musical Score	Unravel: A Swiss Side Love Story	Nominated	
2023 Metro Manila Summer Film Festival	April 11, 2023	Best Float	Unravel: A Swiss Side Love Story	Nominated	
40th PMPC Star Awards for Movies	July 22, 2024	Indie Movie Cinematographer of the Year	Tom Redoble	Won	
