= About Us But Not About Us =

2022 psychological drama film by Jun Lana

- Theatrical release poster
- Directed by: Jun Robles Lana
- Written by: Jun Robles Lana
- Produced by: Jun Robles Lana; Perci Intalan; Ferdy Lapuz; Elmer Gatchalian; Josabeth V. Alonso
- Starring: Romnick Sarmenta; Elijah Canlas
- Cinematography: Neil Daza
- Edited by: Lawrence S. Ang
- Music by: Teresa Barrozo
- Production companies: The IdeaFirst Company; Octoberian Films; Quantum Films
- Release dates: November 23, 2022 (PÖFF); April 8, 2023 (Philippines)
- Country: Philippines
- Languages: English; Filipino

About Us But Not About Us is a 2022 Philippine psychological drama film written, co-produced, and directed by Jun Robles Lana. The film stars Romnick Sarmenta and Elijah Canlas.

The film was first released in Estonia on November 23, 2022, as one of the official entries for the Tallinn Black Nights Film Festival, where it won the Best Film award. It also received a Philippine premiere on April 8, 2023, as one of the entries for the 1st Metro Manila Summer Film Festival, where it won 10 awards, including Best Picture, Best Director, and Best Screenplay.

== Premise ==
Eric (Romnick Sarmenta) and his student, Lancelot (Elijah Canlas) converse over a meal at a restaurant, revealing secrets.

== Cast ==
- Romnick Sarmenta as Ericson; A gay man who worked as a literature professor
- Elijah Canlas portrays two roles which are:
  - Lancelot: A student attending the University of the Philippines who has Ericson as his mentor. His character is helped by Ericson after the student was beaten up by his stepfather. Canlas described the character as a survivalist, who was also victimized by a pedophile priest at ten years old.
  - Marcus: Former husband of Ericson who committed suicide

== Production ==
About Us But Not About Us was produced under The IdeaFirst Company, Octoberian Films, and Quantum Films under the direction of Jun Lana. Perci Intalan, Lana's ex-partner was the producer. Lana described the film as a "personal" project which he created during a "period of depression". Characterizing the film as "part fiction and part confessional", Lana disclosed writing for three straight days for the story of the film, drawing inspiration from his childhood trauma.

The film's story is "conversational" featuring just two seated characters talking to each other in a single setting. A significant part of the story was in English. About Us But Not About Us took five days to shoot, with a script reading taking place a day prior.

It was shot entirely on location at the "L'Opera Ristorante" Italian Restaurant in Bonifacio Global City, Makati, Manila.

== Release ==
The film premiered in Estonia at the 26th Tallinn Black Nights Film Festival in November 2022. It screened in cinemas in the Philippines as one of the eight official entries of the 2023 Metro Manila Summer Film Festival which began on April 8, 2023.

== Reception ==
=== Critical response ===
About Us But Not About Us was recognized as the Best Film in the Critics' Pick competition of the 26th Tallinn Black Nights Film Festival. Film critic Niki Nikitin, as an attendee of the Estonian film festival, praised the film as "masterfully orchestrated" despite having a small budget. Indonesian film critic Bavner Donaldo praised this film for its stunning acting performances with an unexpected conclusion.

=== Accolades ===
Accolades received by About Us But Not About Us
Award	Date of ceremony	Category	Recipient(s)	Result	Ref.
1st Metro Manila Summer Festival	April 11, 2023	Best Picture	About Us But Not About Us	Won	
1st Metro Manila Summer Festival	April 11, 2023	Best Director	Jun Lana	Won	
1st Metro Manila Summer Festival	April 11, 2023	Best Actor	Romnick Sarmenta	Won	
1st Metro Manila Summer Festival	April 11, 2023	Best Screenplay	Jun Lana	Won	
1st Metro Manila Summer Festival	April 11, 2023	Best Production Design	Mabelle Sian	Won	
1st Metro Manila Summer Festival	April 11, 2023	Best Cinematography	Neil Daza	Won	
1st Metro Manila Summer Festival	April 11, 2023	Best Editing	Lawrence Ang	Won	
1st Metro Manila Summer Festival	April 11, 2023	Best Sound	About Us But Not About Us	Won	
1st Metro Manila Summer Festival	April 11, 2023	Best Musical Score	About Us But Not About Us	Won	
1st Metro Manila Summer Festival	April 11, 2023	Best Float	About Us But Not About Us	Nominated	
1st Metro Manila Summer Festival	April 11, 2023	Special Jury Prize	Elijah Canlas	Won	
2024 Gawad Urian Awards	June 8, 2024	Gawad Urian for Best Picture	About Us But Not About Us	Nominated	
2024 Gawad Urian Awards	June 8, 2024	Best Director	Jun Lana	Nominated	
2024 Gawad Urian Awards	June 8, 2024	Best Screenplay	Jun Lana	Won	
2024 Gawad Urian Awards	June 8, 2024	Best Actor	Romnick Sarmenta	Won	
2024 Gawad Urian Awards	June 8, 2024	Best Editing	Lawrence Ang	Nominated	
2024 Gawad Urian Awards	June 8, 2024	Best Sound	Armand De Guzman	Nominated	
7th Eddys	July 7, 2024	Best Picture	About Us But Not About Us	Won	
7th Eddys	July 7, 2024	Best Director	Jun Lana	Won	
7th Eddys	July 7, 2024	Best Actor	Romnick Sarmenta	Nominated	
7th Eddys	July 7, 2024	Best Screenplay	Jun Lana	Won	
7th Eddys	July 7, 2024	Best Editing	Lawrence Ang	Won	

== Stage play ==
Because of the success of the film, IdeaFirst Live! announced the production of the stage play based on the film. The play is set to run from February 14 to March 8, 2026, at the Power Mac Center Spotlight Blackbox Theater, Makati City.
