= Gladys Reyes =

Filipino actress and television presenter (born 1977)

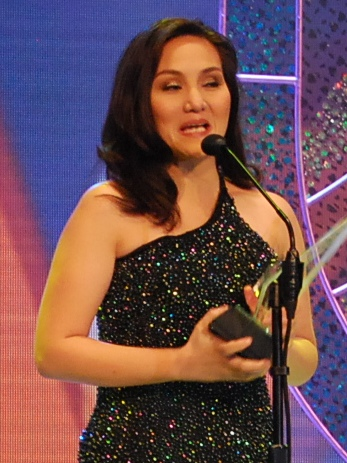
- Reyes in 2011
- Born: June 23, 1977 (age 49); Davao City, Philippines
- Other names: Gladys Reyes-Roxas; Gladys Reyes-Sommereux
- Education: New Era University (A.B.)
- Occupations: Actress, singer
- Years active: 1984–present
- Agent: Star Magic (2025–present)
- Height: 4 ft 11 in (1.50 m)
- Spouse: Christopher Roxas (m. 2004)
- Children: 4

Gladys Reyes-Sommereux (born June 23, 1977), is a Filipino actress, television presenter, entrepreneur, and comedian. She began a career as a child actress after joining Little Miss Philippines segment of Eat Bulaga! in 1984 and rose to fame after playing Clara, the lead antagonist from the classic television series Mara Clara.

== Early life and education ==
Reyes was born on June 23, 1977 in Davao City, Philippines. She is an alumna of New Era University, where she earned her bachelor's degree in Mass Communications. She plans to continue studying for the unfinished course.

== Acting career ==
Known by the alias Primera Kontrabida, Reyes had her big break with the 1990s soap opera Mara Clara, as Clara, which was later portrayed by Julia Montes in the hit remake of the same name.

Reyes is recognized as one of the most celebrated actresses who plays antagonist roles in Philippine television. Her acclaimed films and soap operas has earned her accolades including a Gawad Urian Award, PMPC Star Award for Television and a "Best Actress" trophy at the 1st Summer Metro Manila Film Festival. In 2011, she was appointed as a board member of the Movie and Television Review and Classification Board (MTRCB).

== Personal life ==
Reyes started a relationship with fellow actor Christopher Roxas, her co-star in the Mara Clara soap opera, in 1992. She married on January 23, 2004, at the INC Central Temple in Tandang Sora, Quezon City. They expected to have a first child. Later, she had a miscarriage due to a blighted ovum. After lost their original first child, they had a first child and son named Gian Christophe, on January 23, 2006. They had a second child and their first daughter, named Gianna Aquisha, on July 11, 2008. They had a third child and their second son, named Grant Carlin, on November 20, 2010. They had a fourth child and their third son, named Gavin Cale, on May 10, 2017.

Reyes is a member of Iglesia ni Cristo.

== Acting credits ==
=== Film ===
Key
†	Denotes films that have not yet been released

Gladys Reyes's film credits with year of release, film titles and roles
Year	Title	Role
1984	Baby Tsina	Elena's Baby
1985	Muling Buksan ang Puso	Sandra
1986	Nakagapos na Puso	Young Elisa
1986	Boy Paltik Triggerman	Nanette
1986	Captain Barbell	Kidnap Victim
1988	Afuang: Bounty Hunter	Ablyn Afuang
1988	Ambush	Ging
1989	SuperMouse and the Robo-Rats	Young Dambu
1996	Sana Naman	Noreen
1996	Mara Clara: The Movie	Clara del Valle/Davis
1996	Ang Titser Kong Pogi	Auntie
1996	Kung Alam Mo Lang	Mechie
1997	Isinakdal Ko Ang Aking Ina	Carol
1997	Minsan Lamang Magmamahal	Pinky
1997	Sa Kabilugan ng Buwan	Michelle
1997	Anak ng Dilim	Adela Miranda
1998	Ikaw na Sana	Angela Rosales
1998	I'm Sorry, My Love	Sylvia
1998	Kasal-kasalan (Sakalan)	Angel
1999	Weder-Weder Lang 'Yan	Girlie
1999	Pepeng Agimat	Viola
2001	Tabi-tabi Po!	Minerva
2002	May Pag-ibig Pa Kaya?	Pilar
2002	Cass & Cary: Who Wants to Be a Billionaire?	Attorney Juliet
2002	Biyahera	Lilia
2010	Petrang Kabayo	Pregnant Kalesa Passenger
2012	This Guy's in Love with U Mare!	Terry
2013	Barber's Tales	Susan
2015	Felix Manalo	Avelina Manalo
2016	Die Beautiful	Beth Villar
2018	Ang Dalawang Mrs. Reyes	Betsy
2023	Here Comes the Groom	Salve
2023	Apag	Nita
2024	And the Breadwinner Is...	Mayet Salvador
2025	One Hit Wonder	Ester
2025	Kontrabida Academy	Math Teacher

=== Television / Digital Series ===
Key
†	Denotes shows that have not yet been aired

Gladys Reyes's television credits with year of release, title(s) and role
Year	Title	Role	Notes	Ref.
1984	Little Miss Philippines	Little Miss Metro Manila		
1986	That's Entertainment	Co-Host / Performer		
1992–1997	Mara Clara	Clara del Valle / Clara Davis		
1995–2003; 2026–present	ASAP	Co-Host / Performer		
1997–1998	Ikaw na Sana	Angela Rosales		
1998	Ganyan Kita Kamahal	Gwen		
1998	Wansapanataym		Episode: "Tita-La, Tito-Lo, Niñang, at Niñong"	
1999–2001	Saan Ka Man Naroroon	Melissa Baldamesa		
2000	Wansapanataym		Episode: "Madyik Pinggan ATBP."	
2000	Wansapanataym		Episode: "Kusinero Kuno"	
2000	Wansapanataym		Episode: "Babe Damulag"	
2001	Wansapanataym		Episode: "Magic Headband"	
2001	!Oka Tokat	Veronica	Episode: "Multo in the Mountain"	
2001–2002	Recuerdo de Amor	Maningning Muerto / Leila		
2002–2003	Sa Dulo ng Walang Hanggan	Ruella Agbayani		
2002	Wansapanataym		Episode: "Swapped!"	
2003	Wansapanataym		Episode: "Gayuma"	
2004	Marinara	Tara		
2004	Wansapanataym		Episode: "Tatlong Prinsesa"	
2004	Wansapanataym		Episode: "Esep-Bata"	
2004–2007	Bahay Mo Ba 'To?	Kelly Mulingtapang		
2006–2007	Bakekang	Deborah Yokohama		
2007–2008	Sine Novela: My Only Love	Pearl		
2008	Tasya Fantasya	Mateng		
2008–2009	LaLola	Iris Diaz		
2009	Only You	Dorina Sanchez		
2009–2010	George and Cecil	Miriam Macabanta		
2010	Habang May Buhay	Clarissa Briones		
2011	Guns and Roses	Diana Montano-Alvaro		
2011	Ikaw ay Pag-Ibig	Mrs. Dizon		
2011	Wansapanataym	Mylene	Episode: "Unli-Gift Box"	
2012	Wako Wako	Isay Gaudencio		
2012–2013	Enchanted Garden	Dolores		
2012	Nay-1-1	Host		
2012	Wansapanataym	Mrs. Quintin	Episode: "Ballpen de Sarah Pen"	
2013	Home Sweet Home	Agoncillia Caharian		
2013	Magpakailanman	Sonia	Episode: "Ang tatay kong beki" Credited as "Gladys Reyes"	
2013	Pyra: Babaeng Apoy	Susan del Fierro		
2014	Kambal Sirena	Barrakuda		
2014–2015	Basta Every Day Happy	Host		
2014	Magpakailanman	Nanay Lydia	Episode: "Persia: Asong kanal" Credited as "Gladys Reyes"	
2014	My BFF	Mercedes		
2015	Let the Love Begin	Maricar "Katy" Fernandez / DJ Katy Fairy		
2015–2016	Little Nanay	Vivian San Pedro		
2016	Poor Señorita	Lydia dela Cruz		
2016	Dear Uge	Bella	Episode: "Ang triplets ng Tres Marias"; Credited as "Gladys Reyes"	
2016	Dear Uge	Alma	Episode: "Ang tunay na buhay ni Antonietta"; Credited as "Gladys Reyes"	
2016	Oh, My Mama!	Inday Bartolome		
2016	Dear Uge	Margie	Episode: "Maid in China"; Credited as "Gladys Reyes"	
2017	Hay, Bahay!	Chef Michelin		
2017	Dear Uge	Saling	Episode: "Ang Swerte nga Naman"; Credited as "Gladys Reyes"	
2017	Ipaglaban Mo!	Cristy		
2017	Magpakailanman	Gloria	Episode: "Batik: Ang Santa Claus ng Tarlac"; Credited as "Gladys Reyes"	
2018	Tadhana	Rica	Episode: "Nanny Knows Best"; Credited as "Gladys Reyes"	
2018	Daig Kayo ng Lola Ko	Humpty Mommy	Episode: "Ang kuwento ni Humpty Dumpty"; Credited as "Gladys Reyes"	
2018	Inday Will Always Love You	Amanda Melendez		
2018	Dear Uge	Mommy	Episode: "Twin kasama kita" Credited as "Gladys Reyes"	
2018	Daig Kayo ng Lola Ko	Mama	Episode: "Kakabog-kabog, kakadog-kadog" Credited as "Gladys Reyes"	
2018	Dear Uge	Gloria	Episode: "Merry Mamshies"; Credited as "Gladys Reyes"	
2018	Tadhana	Josie	Episode: "Hostage"; Credited as "Gladys Reyes"	
2019	TODA One I Love	Dyna Tuazon-Generoso†	Supporting Cast / Antagonist	
2019	Wish Ko Lang!	Nicole		
2019	Daddy's Gurl	Malou Manay	Episode: "Teacher Petmalu"; Credited as "Gladys Reyes"	
2019	Daig Kayo ng Lola Ko	Petra	Episode: "The Amazing Adventures of Super Ging, and Harvey Part 1 / 8"; Credited as "Gladys Reyes"	
2019	Imbestigador	Sanny Sevilla-Oandasan		
2019	Tadhana	Gina	Episode: "Bangkay"; Credited as "Gladys Reyes"	
2019	Dear Uge	Mildred	Episode: "Mama madrama" Credited as "Gladys Reyes"	
2019	Imbestigador	Teresita Chavez		
2019	Wish Ko Lang!	Merly		
2019	Pepito Manaloto: Ang Tunay Na Kwento	Aileen		
2019	Dear Uge	Nancy	Episode: "Bahay-bangayan"; Credited as "Gladys Reyes"	
2019	Imbestigador	Regina Romano		
2019–2020	Madrasta	Elizabeth Ledesma		
2020	Dear Uge	Linda	Episode: "No Kiss, All Tell / Chis-Miss Labandera"; Credited as "Gladys Reyes"	
2021	Pepito Manaloto: Ang Unang Kwento	Aling Rosa Generoso		
2022	Tadhana	Martina Fortuna-Valdemor	Episode: "Hanggang Kailan"; Credited as "Gladys Reyes"	
2023–2024	Black Rider	Sasha Buenaventura†		
2023	Wish Ko Lang!	Bernadette "Berna" Asuncion	Episode: "Exchange Gift"; Credited as "Gladys Reyes"	
2024	Pepito Manaloto: Tuloy Ang Kwento	Sasha "Madam Sasha" Buenaventura (guest)		
2024	Abot-Kamay na Pangarap	Morgana "Nushi G." Go / Morgana Go (de jure)		
2025	Maka	Chin-Chin		
2025–2026	Cruz vs Cruz	Hazel Capistrano-Cruz†		
2026	Pinoy Big Brother: Celebrity Collab Edition 2.0	Houseguest (Day 109)		

== Accolades ==
Year	TV Award/Critics	Award	Result
2013	27th PMPC Star Awards for TV	Best Celebrity Talk Show Host Moments	Nominated
2013	Eastwood City Walk of Fame	Walk of Fame Awardee	Won
2015	38th Gawad Urian Awards	Best Supporting Actress (Magkakabaung)	Won
2016	42nd Metro Manila Film Festival	Best Supporting Actress (Die Beautiful)	Nominated
2017	1st EDDYS (Entertainment Editors' Awards)	Best Supporting Actress (Die Beautiful)	Nominated
2017	35th Luna Awards	Best Supporting Actress (Die Beautiful)	Nominated
2023	Metro Manila Summer Film Festival	Best Actress	Won

Year	Award giving body	Category	Nominated work	Results
1989	5th PMPC Star Awards for Movies	Best Child Performer	Ambush	Nominated
2000	14th PMPC Star Awards for TV	Best Drama Actress	Saan Ka Man Naroroon	Won
