= Nico Antonio =

Filipino actor, producer, singer and lawyer

- Born: Jerico Alonso Antonio; Manila, Philippines
- Education: Ateneo de Manila University; San Sebastian College – Recoletos
- Occupations: Actor; comedian; film producer; singer
- Years active: 2004–present
- Notable work: Echorsis; Tandem; Amorosa

Jerico Alonso Antonio, commonly known as Nico Antonio, is a Filipino actor, comedian, lawyer, producer and singer.

== Biography ==
Antonio is the eldest of four siblings born to Reynerio Antonio and Joji Alonso is a film producer. After graduating with a degree in European Studies from the Ateneo de Manila University, where he had finished his primary and secondary education, then he pursued his law degree at San Beda College of Law and eventually graduated from San Sebastian College, as a working student. He has played various roles in several indie films and was a member of the defunct group Voizboys.

== Personal life ==
He married Angel Garces on October 10, 2010, and they have two sons; Josiah, born in 2012 and Jacob, born in 2017. He passed the 2025 Philippine Bar Examinations.

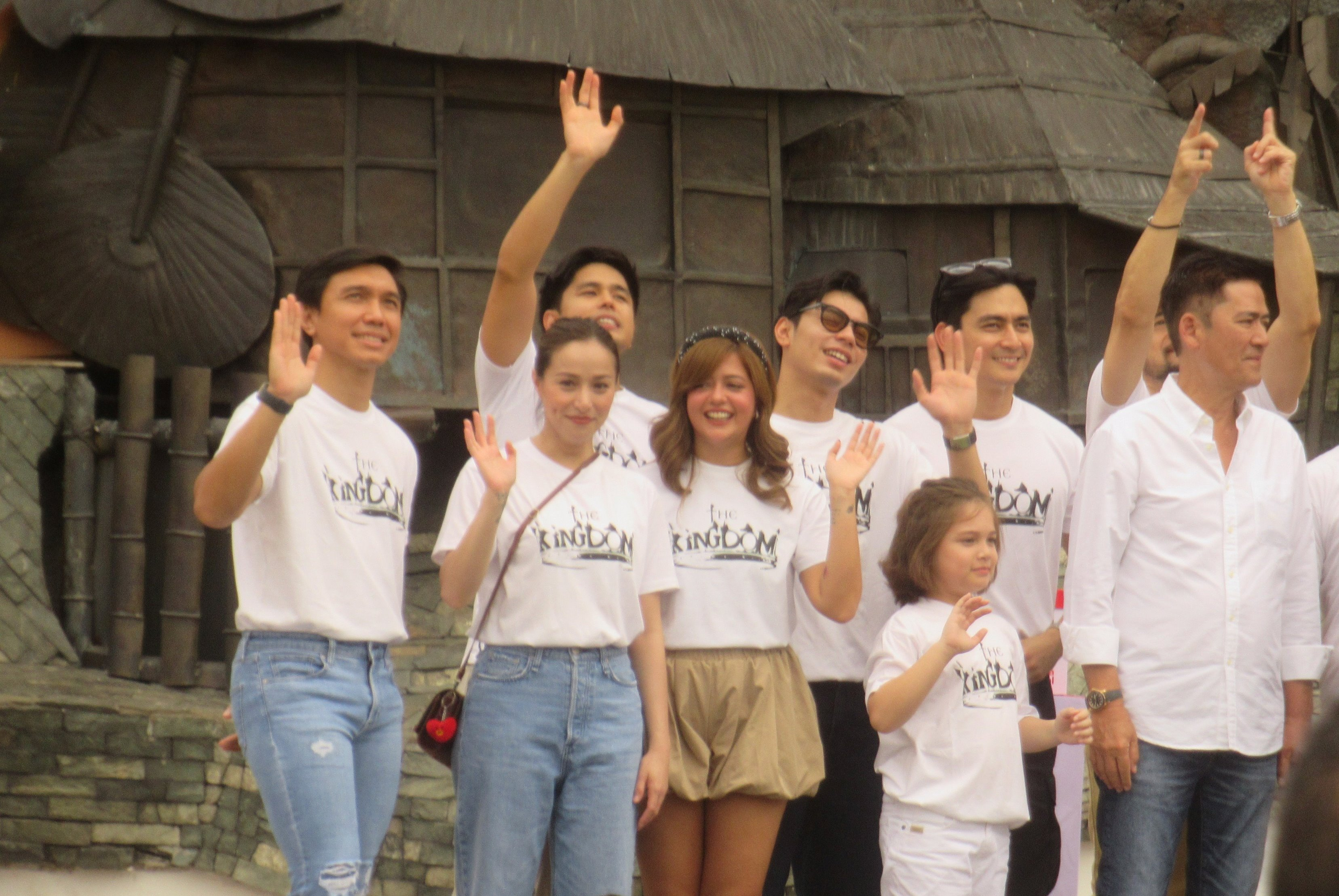
Antonio (The Kingdom)

== Filmography ==
=== Television ===
Year	Title	Role
2010	M3: Malay Mo Ma-develop	Rain
2010	1DOL	Nico
2011–2012	Reputasyon	Jaycee
2013	Carlo J. Caparas' Dugong Buhay	young Alex
2013	Bukas na Lang Kita Mamahalin	John Boy Sanchez
2013	Katipunan	Emilio Aguinaldo
2014	Ipaglaban Mo: Paano Na Ang Pangarap?	Chad
2014	Mars Ravelo's Dyesebel	Gorgo
2015	Maalaala Mo Kaya: Hat	Jason
2015–2016	On the Wings of Love	Antonio "Tolayts" Carpio
2016	FPJ's Ang Probinsyano	Jacinto "Intoy" Santos
2016–2017	Wansapanataym: Santi Cruz Is Coming To Town	Jaime
2017	Wansapanataym: Annika Pintasera	Glen Mercado
2017	Ipaglaban Mo: Testigo	Raul Cabrera
2017	The Promise of Forever	Chester Trinidad / Benjamin "Bing" Reyes / Matthew Santos
2017–2018	The Good Son	Romeo Colmenares
2018	Wansapanataym: Ofishally Yours	Robby
2018–2019	Ngayon at Kailanman	Russell
2019	The General's Daughter	Andrew "Andoy" Apostol
2019	Ang Babae sa Septic Tank 3: The Real Untold Story of Josephine Bracken	
2019	Maalaala Mo Kaya: Dyip	Dale
2019	Kadenang Ginto	Ramon
2019	Ipaglaban Mo: Paninira	Ryan
2019	One of the Baes	Benjie
2020–2021	Ang sa Iyo ay Akin	Blue Baltazar
2022–2023	Mars Ravelo's Darna	Vorian
2023	Big Bet	Mark Flores
2023	Teen Clash	Manager Ry
2023	Voltes V: Legacy	Gen. Oslack
2023	Almost Paradise	Carlo Guzman
2023–2024	Nag-aapoy na Damdamin	Emilio Abello
2024	FPJ's Batang Quiapo	Simon
2025	Mommy Dearest	Michael Espiritu-Zamora
2025	Sins of the Father	Rafael Sandoval
2026	Sanggang-Dikit FR	Prosecution
2026	Blood vs Duty	Benny Santerva
2026	Coco Martin's Sigabo	Ernesto Rallos

=== Film ===
Year	Title	Role	Ref.
2006	Minsan Pa	Pablo	
2006	The Bet Collector	Baste	
2007	Baliw	Teck	
2007	Angels	Barkada	
2009	Biyaheng Lupa	MTV Singer	
2009	Ang laro ng buhay ni Juan	Noel	
2010	Magkakapatid		
2010	I Do	Olan	
2010	Emir	Farmer	
2010	Here Comes the Bride	Ding	
2010	My Amnesia Girl	Poch	
2011	Amok	Traffic Violator	
2011	The Adventures of Pureza: Queen of the Riles	Hipon	
2012	Si Agimat, si Enteng Kabisote at si Ako	DENR Official	
2012	Captive	Arnulfo Reyes	
2012	Amorosa	Glen	
2012	Posas	Jess Biag	
2012	The Strangers	Toning	
2013	Tuhog	Adrian Sucat	
2013	The Diplomat Hotel		
2013	Sana Dati	John	
2013	Instant Mommy	Olops	
2013	Gaydar	Kidnapper	
2013	Bendor		
2013	The Bit Player	Gaffer	
2013	Babagwa	Peewee	
2013	Saturday Night Chills	Arrogant Man	
2013	My Little Bossings	Bodgie	
2014	The Trial	Paco's friend	
2014	M: Mother's Maiden Name		
2014	Beauty in a Bottle	Asst. Brand Manager	
2014	Red		
2014	My Big Bossing	Dody	
2015	Tandem	Roman	
2015	Beast	Jessi's Henchman	
2015	WalangForever	Winwin	
2015	Heneral Luna	Andrés Bonifacio	
2016	Echorsis	Menchu	
2016	Straight to the Heart		
2016	My Candidate	Coco Mikael	
2017	Ilawod	Albularyo Assistant	
2017	All of You	Borj	
2018	Ang Dalawang Mrs. Reyes	Steve Reyes	
2018	The Girl in the Orange Dress	Julio	
2019	Time & Again	Freddie	
2019	Abandoned	Sol	
2019	The Annulment	Ryan	
2020	Manila Gays		
2020	Bully'Kang: Ang Mga Bestfriends Nating Bully		
2023	Voltes V: Legacy – The Cinematic Experience	Oslack	
2023	Here Comes the Groom	Winona William	
2023	Kampon	Ranulfo	
2024	Lolo and the Kid	John	
2024	The Kingdom	Tarek	
2025	Bar Boys: After School	Security Guard	
2025	Unmarry	Atty. Willie Bautista	
2026	Sisa	Santiago	
2026	Silenced Nights		

=== Producer ===
- 2014 – Bwaya
- 2016 – I America
