= Yoo Min-gon =

Canadian actor in the Philippines

Yoo Min-Gon
- Born: March 7, 1989 (age 37); Canada
- Occupation: Actor
- Known for: Yung Libro sa Napanood Ko

Yoo Min-Gon is a Canadian-born South Korean actor. He was known for starring with Bella Padilla in the film Yung Libro sa Napanood Ko.

== Career ==
Yoo is a Canadian-born Korean and is fluent in speaking English. However, Yoo did not play in English-language films before having portrayed roles only in Korean films prior to Yung Libro sa Napanood Ko.

== Filmography ==
Year	Title	Role	Note
2020	Time to Hunt		Guest Role
2021	Unboxing Girl	Chang Ho	Support Role
2022	Cafe Midnight: Missing Honey		Guest Role
2023	Yung Libro sa Napanood Ko	Kim Gun-hoo	Main Role
