= Romnick Sarmenta =

Filipino actor (born 1972)

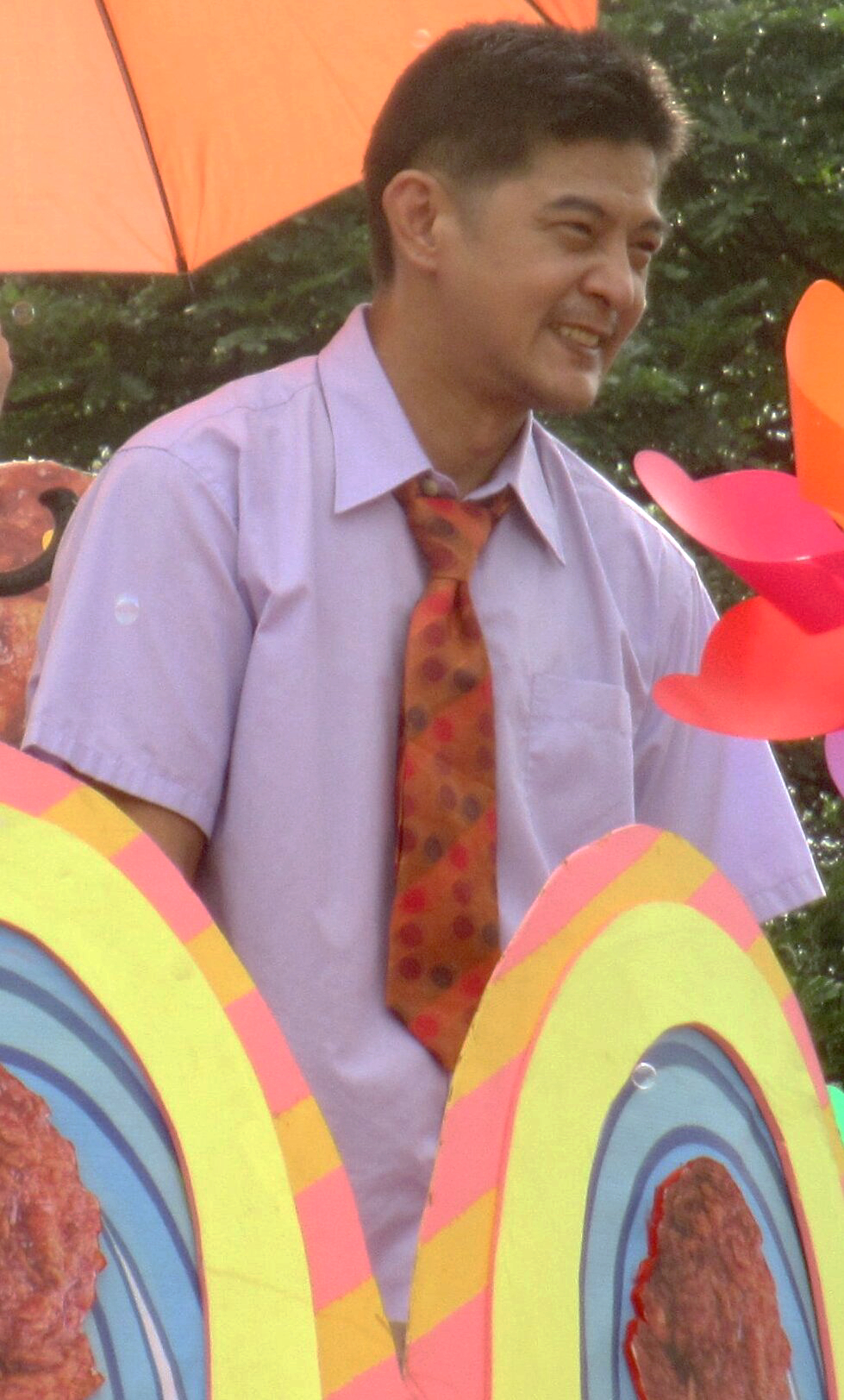
- Sarmenta in 2023
- Born: Romeo Nicolas Sarmenta Tejedor; April 28, 1972 (age 54); Quezon City, Rizal, Philippines
- Occupation: Actor
- Years active: 1977–present
- Television: ABS-CBN; GMA Network; RPN; TV5 Network; IBC
- Spouses: Harlene Bautista (separated); Barbara Ruaro
- Children: 6

Romeo "Romnick" Nicolas Sarmenta Tejedor (born April 28, 1972) is a Filipino actor, film producer and professor. Noted for his performances in a range of genres across film and television, he began his career as a child actor debuting in the series Gulong ng Palad. With a career spanning nearly five decades, his accolades included the Best Actor won from the Asian Television Award, a Gawad Urian and Summer Metro Manila Film Festival, in addition to numerous nominations from the FAMAS Awards and Young Critics Circle.

== Early life and education ==
Sarmenta was born in Quezon City, Philippines. He is of Spanish, Chinese, and Japanese descent and was raised primarily by his maternal grandfather and mother.

Sarmenta is a native of Cabanatuan City, Nueva Ecija. In a 2016 interview during the TOFARM Film Festival held in the city, he expressed support for the event and recalled spending his summers in the rural parts of Cabanatuan, where his grandfather taught him to work in the fields — learning how to herd carabaos, plow, plant rice, and later, carpentry from relatives. He said these experiences shaped his appreciation for real, honest labor.

Sarmenta spent his grade school and most of his high school years in UST Angelicum College. He spent three years studyingArchitecture at the University of Santo Tomas (UST), balancing the rigorous demands of drafting and design with his professional acting commitments.

== Career ==
=== Late '70s to early '80s: career beginnings and child star era ===
At the early age of four, Sarmenta began his acting career by portraying Peping, the young kid, in the enduring drama series and groundbreaking telenovela Gulong ng Palad (1977–1983). For this role, he received a nomination for Best Child Actor at the 1978 FAMAS Awards.

He debuted as one of the performers on the variety show That's Entertainment, presented by the late Master Showman German Moreno, just three years after his first TV employment. His debut acting role was in the movie Pinagbuklod ng Pag-ibig, which also starred Nora Aunor, Vilma Santos, Tirso Cruz III, and Romeo Velasquez.

He was also chosen to play Ding, Darna's steadfast sidekick, in Rio Locsin's 1979 Darna movie.

=== 1980s: Career prime and popularity ===
Sarmenta was coupled with a variety of leading ladies throughout the height of his career, including Jennifer Sevilla, Sheryl Cruz, and Harlene Bautista. But his loveteam with Sheryl Cruz resonated the most among fans and viewers. Puso sa Puso (1988), Langit at Lupa (1988), and Pardina at ang mga Duwende (1989) were three of their projects together.

=== 1990s ===
With the help of violent fist and gun battles and demanding stunts in the movies, Romnick became a well-known action star. In addition, he acted in historical dramas such as Tirad Pass: The Story of Gen. Gregorio del Pilar (1997), in which he played the lead role, and Damong Ligaw (1997), a movie version of Ceres Alabado's novel KangKong 1896, in which he played a farm child who became a Katipunero. In the Gil Portes drama film Miguel/Michelle from 1998, Sarmenta also played a gay character.

=== 2020s ===
In 2022, he played the father of Daniel Padilla's character on 2 Good 2 Be True. He then played another gay character in the film About Us But Not About Us. In 2024, he played the journalist character on a sequel to Senior High, High Street.

== Personal life ==
Sarmenta is previously married to actress Harlene Bautista. They have five children. He is married to his second wife, Barbara Ruaro and they have 2 boys together.

He is an avid cyclist, and an active member of Elim, a Catholic Christian community, where he serves and is actively involved in missionary works of the community.

== Filmography ==
=== Film ===
Year	Title	Role	Notes	Ref.
1978	Pinagbuklod ng Pag-ibig			
1978	The Jess Lapid Story			
1979	Batang Salabusab			
1979	Bira, Darna, Bira!	Ding	Credited as "Romnick"	
1980	Kung Tawagin Siya'y Bathala			
1980	Diablo Sagrado			
1981	Lukso ng Dugo			
1983	My Darling Princess	Michael		
1984	Pieta, Ikalawang Aklat	Young Noel		
1984	Condemned			
1986	Halimaw sa Banga			
1987	Takot Ako, Eh!	Romeo		
1987	Tatlong Ina, Isang Anak			
1987	Huwag Mong Buhayin ang Bangkay	Roy		
1988	Leroy Leroy Sinta			
1988	Rock-a-Bye Baby: Tatlo Ang Daddy	Joey		
1988	Puso sa Puso	Daniel		
1988	Guhit ng Palad			
1988	Langit at Lupa			
1988	One Two Bato, Three Four Bapor			
1989	Pardina at ang Mga Duwende	Dino		
1989	Everlasting Love	Ricardo		
1989	First Lesson			
1990	Sagot ng Puso	Mando		
1990	Mundo Man Ay Magunaw	Archie		
1990	Beautiful Girl			
1990	Naughty Boys			
1991	Kapag Nag-abot ang Langit at Lupa			
1991	Ubos Na ang Luha Ko			
1991	Kung Tayo'y Magkakalayo			
1991	Tukso Layuan Mo Ako	Daniel		
1992	Takbo... Talon... Tili!!!			
1992	Sa Aking Puso: The Marcos 'Bong' Manalang Story	Bong Manalang		
1992	Sonny Boy, Public Enemy Number 1 of Cebu City	Sonny Boy		
1992	Alyas Stella Magtanggol			
1992	Eh, Kasi Bata			
1993	Lumuhod Ka sa Lupa			
1993	Mario Sandoval			
1994	Ging Gang Goody Giddiyap	Bong		
1994	Bawal Na Gamot			
1994	Johnny Tinoso and the Proud Beauty			
1995	Bawal Na Gamot 2			
1995	Ka Hector			
1995	Kahit Harangan ng Bala	Bobbit Zaragosa		
1995	The Bocaue Pagoda Tragedy			
1996	Sariwa	Luisito		
1996	Tirad Pass: The Last Stand of Gen. Gregorio del Pilar	Gregorio del Pilar		
1997	Damong Ligaw	Florante		
1997	Ang Pulubi at ang Prinsesa	Baldo		
1998	Miguel/Michelle	Miguel/Michelle de la Cruz		
1998	Berdugo	Joselito		
2006	Umaaraw, Umuulan			
2007	Prinsesa			
2014	Hustisya		10th Cinemalaya Independent Film Festival entry	
2018	Kung Paano Hinihintay Ang Dapithapon	Chito	14th Cinemalaya Independent Film Festival entry	
2019	Clarita	Warden		
2019	Yours Truly, Shirley	Ronaldo	15th Cinema One Originals Digital Film Festival entry	
2019	Write About Love	Robert	45th Metro Manila Film Festival entry	
2022	About Us But Not About Us	Ericson	1st Summer Metro Manila Film Festival entry	
2025	Everything About My Wife	Atty. Marlon		
2025	One Hit Wonder	Ben		
2025	Quezon	Sergio Osmeña		
2026	Sisa	General Artemio	Supporting role, 29th Tallinn Black Nights Film Festival entry	
2026	Los Salvajes Bravos	Ismael Alzate		

=== Television ===
Year	Title	Role
1977–1985	Gulong ng Palad	Peping
1986	That's Entertainment	
1987–1993	Young Love, Sweet Love	
1991	Bistek	
1991	Maalaala Mo Kaya: Rubber Shoes	
1993	Petabisyon	
1993–2001	Star Drama Presents	Nico
1997–1998	Esperanza	Emil
1997	Star Drama Presents: Angelika: Best Friend	
1999–2001	Maynila	
2001	Sa Puso Ko, Iingatan Ka	Chandro
2002	Bituin	Peping
2004	Mulawin	Habagat
2005	Now and Forever: Ganti	Henry
2005	Mahiwagang Baul: Si Han at si Genie	Han
2005	Encantadia	Avilan
2006	Daisy Siete	Julian
2006	Bakekang	Francis
2007	Impostora	Henry Carreon
2008	Daisy Siete: Vaklushii	Ramil
2008–2009	Luna Mystika	Dominic
2009	Maalaala Mo Kaya: Pedicab	Tobias
2009	Your Song Presents: Boystown	Daniel
2009	All My Life	Efren Estrella
2010	First Time	Marcel Luna
2011	Maalaala Mo Kaya: Internet Shop	Boy
2011	Magic Palayok	Richard "James" Cruz
2011	Iglot	Father Ruben
2013	Maalaala Mo Kaya	Alberto Samartino
2017	La Luna Sangre	Antonio "Tonio" Torralba
2018–2019	Halik	Mauricio "Mauro" Montefalco
2019–2020	FPJ's Ang Probinsyano	Juan Morcilla / Mark Quiambao / Lemuel Pineda
2019	Bagman	Ricardo Matias
2019	Taiwan That You Love	Eduardo
2021	Love Beneath The Stars	Ben Cruz
2022	2 Good 2 Be True	Frederico "Fred" Borja
2023	Teen Clash	Rico David
2023	Unbreak My Heart	Mario Isidro
2024	What's Wrong with Secretary Kim	Felix Liwanag
2024	High Street	Dante T. Eballa
2024	Maka	Victor "V" Felipe
2025	Maalaala Mo Kaya: Apoy	Oniol Vasquez
2025	Bad Genius	Vin
2025	Magpakailanman: Bata, Bata, Paano ka Kinasal?	Berting
2025–2026	The Alibi	Andres

=== Theater ===
Year	Production	Role	Location	Ref.
2003	Kanjincho		University Theater (Villamor Hall), UP Diliman	
2003	Kanjincho		CCP Main Theater	
2007	Ang Pasyon ni Kristo	Jesus Christ	Wilfrido Ma. Guerrero Theater	
2013	Teatro Porvenir	Andres Bonifacio (Note: Sarmenta performed as alternate.)	Wilfrido Ma. Guerrero Theater	
2024	Kumprontasyon (Note: Sarmenta appeared in the one-act play, The Impossible Dream.)	Senator Ninoy Aquino	PETA Theater Center	
2025	Kumprontasyon	Senator Ninoy Aquino	PETA-PHINMA Theater	
2026	About Us But Not About Us	Eric	Power Mac Center Spotlight Blackbox Theater	

== Awards and nominations ==
Year	Award	Category	Film	Result	Source
1989	Box Office Entertainment Awards	Popular Teenage King of Philippine Movies		Won	
1979	FAMAS Awards	Best Child Actor	Pinagbuklod ng Pag-ibig	Nominated	
1985	FAMAS Awards	Best Child Actor	Ikalawang Aklat	Nominated	
1993	FAMAS Awards	Best Actor	Sa Aking Puso: The Marcos 'Bong' Manalang Story	Nominated	
1999	FAMAS Awards	Best Actor	Miguel/Michelle	Nominated	
2015	FAMAS Awards	Best Supporting Actor	Hustisya	Nominated	
2023	Metro Manila Film Festival	Best Supporting Actor	Becky and Badette	Nominated	
2022	Metro Manila Summer Film Festival	Best Actor	About Us But Not About Us	Won	
1995	Gawad Urian Awards	Best Supporting Actor	Johnny Tinoso and the Proud Beauty	Nominated	
1998	Gawad Urian Awards	Best Actor	Damong ligaw	Nominated	
1999	Gawad Urian Awards	Best Actor	Miguel/Michelle	Nominated	
2008	Gawad Urian Awards	Best Actor	Princesa	Nominated	
2019	Gawad Urian Awards	Best Supporting Actor	Kung Paano Hinihintay Ang Dapithapon	Nominated	
2024	Gawad Urian Awards	Best Actor	About Us But Not About Us	Won	
2008	Golden Screen Awards	Best Performance by an Actor in a Lead Role (Drama)	Princesa	Nominated	
1998	Young Critics Circle Awards	Best Performance by Male or Female, Adult or Child, Individual or Ensemble in Leading or Supporting Role	Damong Ligaw	Nominated	
1999	Asian Television Awards	Best Actor	Miguel/Michelle	Won	
