= Apag =

Feast
- Theatrical release poster
- Kapampangan: Apag
- Directed by: Brillante Mendoza
- Production company: Center Stage Productions
- Release dates: October 2022 (BIFF); April 8, 2023 (Philippines)
- Country: Philippines
- Language: Kapampangan

Apag (lit. 'Dining table'; Feast) is a 2022 Philippine drama film directed by Brillante Mendoza.

== Premise ==
Kapampangan restaurateur Rafael Tuazon (Coco Martin) who was making preparations for a feast, finds himself in a fatal vehicular accident which took the life of a tricycle driver (Matias). His father Alfredo Tuazon (Lito Lapid) takes a fall for the crime to save his son from legal repercussions. Rafael, free but overcome by guilt, tries to make amends to Nita (Gladys Reyes), the widow of the driver.

== Cast ==
- Coco Martin as Rafael Tuazon
- Lito Lapid as Alfredo Tuazon
- Gladys Reyes as Nita
- Jaclyn Jose as Elise Tuazon
- Gina Pareño as Lola Adela
- Julio Diaz as Manong Felix
- Ronwaldo Martin as NogNog
- Joseph Marco as Marco

Other cast members include Shaina Magdayao, Mark Lapid, Vince Rillon and Joseph Marco. Aljur Abrenica was to play Rafael Tuazon, but was replaced by Martin after Abrenica withdrew from the film project.

== Production ==
Apag was produced by Center Stage Productions with Brillante Mendoza as its director and Arianna Martinez as its screenplay writer. The film was partially financed by the Hong Kong International Film Festival Society, which stipulated that Mendoza produce a film which does not feature sex, violence, or politics – a usual element of Mendoza's previous films.

The name of the film, Apag comes from the shorthand of "Hapag Kainan" or Dinner Table. The film is a homage to Mendoza's Kapampangan roots, using a strictly Pampangueno cast and was film in the Kapampangan language.

Mendoza created an alternative ending for the film following the suggestion of lead actor Coco Martin. The new ending, was described as a somewhat violent conclusion compared to the original's usual happy ending. It was made to be compliant with the submission requirements for the 2023 Metro Manila Summer Film Festival. The film unaltered is ineligible for entry due to having already screened in various international film festivals by that time.

== Release ==
Apag was released internationally as Feast. It premiered at the Busan International Film Festival in October 2022. From 2022 to 2023 was showcased in various international film festivals such as the Warsaw Film Festival, World Film Festival of Bangkok, Vesoul International Film Festival, and the Asian Film Festival in South Korea.

The film screened in cinemas across the Philippines as one of the eight official entries of the 2023 Metro Manila Summer Film Festival which began on April 8, 2023. The 2023 MMSFF release featured an ending different than the one screened in previous international film festivals.

== Accolades ==
Accolades received by Apag
Award	Date of ceremony	Category	Recipient(s)	Result	Ref.
2023 Metro Manila Summer Film Festival	April 11, 2023	Best Actress	Gladys Reyes	Won	
2023 Metro Manila Summer Film Festival	April 11, 2023	Best Original Theme Song	Apag	Won	
2023 Metro Manila Summer Film Festival	April 11, 2023	Best Float	Apag	Nominated	
40th PMPC Star Awards for Movies	July 22, 2024	Indie Movie Sound Engineer of the Year	Albert Michael Idioma	Won	
