= Here Comes the Groom (2023 film) =

2023 comedy film by Chris Martinez

- Theatrical release poster
- Directed by: Chris Martinez
- Written by: Chris Martinez
- Based on: Characters created by Chris Martinez
- Starring: Enchong Dee; Keempee de Leon; Maris Racal; Awra Briguela; Gladys Reyes; Eugene Domingo
- Cinematography: Mo Zee
- Edited by: Dennis A. Salgado
- Music by: Emerzon Texon
- Production companies: Quantum Films; Cineko Productions; Brightlight Productions
- Distributed by: Quantum Films
- Release date: April 8, 2023
- Country: Philippines
- Language: Filipino

Here Comes the Groom is a 2023 Philippine comedy film starring Enchong Dee, Maris Racal, Keempee de Leon, Gladys Reyes and Eugene Domingo. The film is written and directed by Chris Martinez and is under the production of Quantum Films, Cineko Productions and Brightlight Productions.

It is one of the official entries for 2023 Metro Manila Summer Film Festival and was released on April 8, 2023. The film is the standalone sequel to the film, Here Comes the Bride released in 2010, also written and directed by Martinez. Like its predecessor, the film features body swapping between multiple people.

== Plot ==
Rodrigo Sr., his wife Salve, their children Rodrigo Jr. and Blesilda are a devout Roman Catholic family serving in their parish church. Junior is preparing for his wedding to his fiancée Yumi. On their way to the resort venue, they encounter a group of drag performers going to a beauty pageant. Rodrigo launches homophobic slurs against the group, composed of Mama Wendy and her wards Wanda, Wilhelmina, Winona and their trainer Whitney. As they continue their journey, Rodrigo and his family traverse the Magnetic Hill as a solar eclipse is about to take place. They encounter Mama Wendy's vehicle, which goes out of control and collides head-on with Rodrigo's car.

Upon recovery, Rodrigo wakes up in Wanda's body and berates the gays around him, while Wanda wakes up in Rodrigo's body. Rodrigo attempts to escape but is blocked by Mama Wendy, thinking that she is just rehearsing. Blesilda, who is now on Whitney's body prays for forgiveness to God, thinking that she and her father had died and have been reborn as gays as divine punishment. Wanda desperately tries to avoid Salve's advances while despairing at being in an aged body. Whitney, now on Blesilda's body, is initially ecstatic, showing her wild side to Salve and bonding with her but later laments having to endure dysmenorrhea. Junior, now on Wilhelmina's body, escapes and overpowers transphobic drunkards on his way to the venue, but is unable to enter despite claiming he's the groom. Wilhelmina, now in Junior's body, is disappointed at his appearance and is desperate to avoid the sexual advances of an unaware Yumi. Wilhelmina takes a liking to Sean, Junior's best friend, and best man for the wedding, and goes out for a swim with the latter, who expresses his feelings to Junior, unaware of what has happened.

With the help of Salve's barangay chairman cousin Joy, who had initially invited the gays for the pageant and had quickly guessed what happened, Rodrigo, Blesilda and Mama Wendy go to the resort to seek Salve, Wanda and Wilhelmina/Junior. On their way, Blesilda and Rodrigo encounter Salve and confront a defensive Whitney at a mall before being stopped by Mama Wendy and Joy, who explain to her everything and reveal that Whitney is an orphan who wanted to experience having a family. Junior manages to enter the resort and confronts Sean who is about to kiss Wilhelmina as Salve and Joy arrive. Rodrigo sees Wanda wearing makeup and partying and launches homophobic rants. Angered, Mama Wendy and her group prepare to leave for the beauty pageant but Junior, reeling from his earlier brawl with the transphobes, berates his father for his bigotry and begs the gays to stay and help him save his wedding while they search for a solution. Mama Wendy agrees on the condition that the family compete on their behalf at the pageant, which is won by Winona. Rodrigo and his family help Wilhelmina on Junior's wedding. Junior, who learns about Sean's true feelings from Wilhelmina, accepts Sean's identity but insists that he loves Yumi, saying he wants to continue being friends with him and promising to help him find a boyfriend instead.

On their wedding night, Yumi tries to consummate her marriage with Junior's body before he is stopped by Junior, who explains what happened. Yumi recognizes Junior because of his term of endearment to her and accepts him despite being in another body. Mama Wendy seeks help from Kuya Kim, a fellow resort guest, to return everything to normal. Kuya Kim explains that they are victims of a soul swapping that occurred during the solar eclipse at the Magnetic Hill, which previously occurred 13 years ago, and the only way to get back their souls is to recreate the accident at Magnetic Hill during the next solar eclipse, which is scheduled after seven years. Rodrigo, Salve, Junior, Blesilda, Mama Wendy, Wanda, Whitney and Wilhelmina move in together in Rodrigo's house and wait seven years for the eclipse, after which, they recreate the accident and return to normal. The film ends with Rodrigo's now-accepting family singing karaoke with the gays as a still-queasy Blesilda attempts to dance wildly.

== Cast ==
=== Main Cast ===
- Enchong Dee as Rodrigo Jr. (Junior), the conservative, shy groom who has saved him for soon-to-be wife. (switched to Wilhelmina's body)
- Keempee de Leon as Bro. Rodrigo Sr., Salve's husband (switched to Wanda's body)
- Maris Racal as Blesilda, Rodrigo Jr.'s sister, the sing of the choirs (switched to Whitney's body)
- Awra Briguela as Whitney, his gay orphan, training pageant, dancer and Mama Wendy's care (switched to Blesilda's body)
- Gladys Reyes as Salve, Rodrigo Sr.'s wife

=== Supporting Cast ===
- Eugene Domingo as Joy Gising, Chairwoman of San Rafael, Salve's cousin Rodrigo Jr.'s godmother
- Miles Ocampo as Yumi, the bride of Rodrigo Jr.
- Tony Labrusca as Hans, best man of Rodrigo
- Xilhouete as Wanda Wong (switched to Rodrigo Sr.'s body)
- KaladKaren as Wilhelmina Wilwayco (switched to Rodrigo Jr.'s body)
- Nico Antonio as Winona William
- Iyah Mina as Mama Wendy
- Fino Herrera as Axel, former boyfriend of Wilhelmina

=== Special Participation ===
- Kim Atienza as himself

== Production ==
Due to the success of the film Here Comes the Bride in 2010, the writer and director the film decided to proceed for a sequel and conceptualized this film in mid-2022. The script was submitted to the Metro Manila Development Authority in January 2023 and was finally announced as one of the entries for the first Summer edition of Metro Manila Film Festival on February 24, 2023.

Like the 2010 film, Here Comes the Groom also features body swapping caused by a vehicular accident interacting with a mysterious magnetic field during a solar eclipse, albeit with a different cast.

== Marketing ==
The first trailer of the film was released on March 3, 2023.

== Soundtrack ==
The movie's theme song is Amakabogera, performed by Maymay Entrata.

== Release ==
Here Comes the Groom premiered in cinemas in the Philippines as one of the eight official entries of the 2023 Metro Manila Summer Film Festival which began on April 8, 2023. Proceeds from the screening of the film as part of the film festival will go to various beneficiaries in the film industry including the Movie Workers Welfare Foundation, Motion Picture and Anti-Film Piracy Council, Film Development Council of the Philippines, Movie and Television Review and Classification Board, and the Optical Media Board. Amazon Prime Video also released the movie for streaming on July 20, 2023.

== Accolades ==
Accolades received by Here Comes The Groom
Award	Date of ceremony	Category	Recipient(s)	Result	Ref.
2023 Metro Manila Summer Film Festival	April 11, 2023	Best Picture	Here Comes The Groom	3rd Best Picture	
2023 Metro Manila Summer Film Festival	April 11, 2023	Best Director	Chris Martinez	Nominated	
2023 Metro Manila Summer Film Festival	April 11, 2023	Best Actor	Enchong Dee	Nominated	
2023 Metro Manila Summer Film Festival	April 11, 2023	Best Supporting Actor	Keempee de Leon	Won	
2023 Metro Manila Summer Film Festival	April 11, 2023	Best Supporting Actor	Nico Antonio	Nominated	
2023 Metro Manila Summer Film Festival	April 11, 2023	Best Supporting Actor	Xilhouete	Nominated	
2023 Metro Manila Summer Film Festival	April 11, 2023	Best Supporting Actress	KaladKaren	Won	
2023 Metro Manila Summer Film Festival	April 11, 2023	Best Screenplay	Chris Martinez	Nominated	
2023 Metro Manila Summer Film Festival	April 11, 2023	Best Production Design	Angel B. Diesta	Nominated	
2023 Metro Manila Summer Film Festival	April 11, 2023	Best Editing	Dennis A. Salgado	Nominated	
2023 Metro Manila Summer Film Festival	April 11, 2023	Best Sound	Here Comes The Groom	Nominated	
2023 Metro Manila Summer Film Festival	April 11, 2023	Best Float	Here Comes The Groom	Nominated	
2023 Metro Manila Summer Film Festival	April 11, 2023	Special Jury Prize	Here Comes The Groom	Won	
