= Summer Metro Manila Film Festival =

Philippine film festival

- Location: Metro Manila
- Founded: 2020
- Awards: Gabi ng Parangal (transl. Awards Night)
- Language: Primarily Filipino

The Summer Metro Manila Film Festival (Summer MMFF) is a film festival intended to be held annually in Metro Manila, Philippines. The event is a spin-off of the Metro Manila Film Festival which is officially held every December. Like its sister festival, it excludes foreign films and only shows shortlisted entries in digital theaters except IMAX and 4D theaters.

It was originally slated to take place in 2020, but the COVID-19 pandemic forced to halt the event as a result of closure of the theaters having to shut for over 20 months. The first edition was held in April 2023.

== Background ==
The Metro Manila Summer Film Festival was intended to be as a "second run" of the annual Metro Manila Film Festival (MMFF). The summer festival was proposed to start on Black Saturday which usually falls in the summer season of the Philippines while the regular MMFF will continue to start every Christmas Day of the year. A summer iteration of the MMFF was adopted to encourage Filipino filmmakers to create more films. It would not be the first time the MMFF was held "twice a year". During the tenure of Mayors Antonio Villegas of Manila and Joseph Estrada of San Juan, the MMFF was held twice with the first run starting every June 24 or Manila Foundation Day and the second run on December 25.

The summer film festival was a proposal of Senator Bong Go who became a member of the MMFF Executive Committee in 2019. The MMFF Executive Committee adopted Go's proposal and announced the establishment of a summer festival. Originally the Metro Manila Summer Film Festival (MMSFF), the first edition was set to be held from April 11 to 21, 2020 but was cancelled due to the ongoing coronavirus pandemic. It would be organized in partnership with the Cinema Exhibitors Association of the Philippines. In 2021, the film festival was not held at all due to the pandemic. It was not held again in 2022 due to scheduling conflicts with the 2022 Philippine general election.

The first Summer Metro Manila Film Festival was organized in April 2023. However, no film festival was held in the succeeding years as of 2026.

== Festivals ==
Festival	Year	Awards Night	
Festival	Year	Venue	City
— (Note: Cancelled inaugural edition) (details)	2020	Cancelled (Note: No venue has ever been announced)	
—	2021–2022	Not held	
1st	2023	New Frontier Theater	Quezon City
