= 36th PMPC Star Awards for Movies =

2021 Philippine Movie Press Club awards

36th Star Awards for Movies
- Date: September 26, 2021
- Site: Virtual awarding ceremony
- Hosted by: Sanya Lopez; Alfred Vargas

Highlights
- Best Picture: Hello, Love, Goodbye; Mindanao (indie)

The 36th PMPC Star Awards for Movies by the Philippine Movie Press Club (PMPC), honored the best Filipino films of 2019. The ceremony took place on September 26, 2021 via virtual award ceremony.

The PMPC Star Awards for Movies was hosted by Sanya Lopez and Alfred Vargas. Hello, Love, Goodbye won the top awards with Movie of the Year, Movie Director of the Year and Movie Original Screenplay of the Year, while Mindanao won the Indie Movie of the Year and Best Indie Director of the Year.

== Winners and nominees ==
The following are the nominations for the 36th PMPC Star Awards for Movies, covering films released in 2019.

Winners are listed first and indicated in bold.

=== Major categories ===
Movie of the Year	Indie Movie of the Year
Winner: **Hello, Love, Goodbye** (Star Cinema): "LSS” (Globe Studios and Dokimos Media Inc.); “Maria” (BlackOps Studios Asia and Viva Films); “Quezon’s Game” (Star Cinema, Kinitek Productions, iWant); “The Panti Sisters” (Black Sheep Productions, The IdeaFirst Company, Quantum Films); “Unforgettable” (Viva Films and The IdeaFirst Company); “Write About Love” (TBA Studios)	Winner: **Mindanao”** (Center Stage Productions): “Babae At Baril” (Cignal Entertainment, Epicmedia, QCinema); “Edward” (Cinemalaya Foundation, Awkward Penguin, Viva Films, Outpost Visual Frontier); “Guerrero Dos, Tuloy Ang Laban” (EBC Films); “John Denver Trending” (Cinemalaya Foundation, What If Films Philippines, Southern Lantern Pictures, Tinker Bulb Productions, Outpost Visual Frontier); “Kalel, 15” (The IdeaFirst Company, Octobertrain Films, Cignal Entertainment); “Lola Igna” (ERJ Found Films and EMBA Productions); “Metamorphosis” (Rebelde Films and Cinema One Originals)
Movie Ensemble Acting of the Year	Indie Movie Ensemble Acting of the Year
Winner: **Miracle in Cell No. 7**: “Hello, Love, Goodbye”; “Kuwaresma”; “Miracle In Cell No. 7”; “Quezon’s Game”; “The Panti Sisters”; “Unforgettable”; “Write About Love”	Winner: **John Denver Trending**: “Babae at Baril”; “Circa”; “Edward”; “Iska”; “John Denver Trending”; “Lola Igna”; “Metamorphosis”; “Mindanao”
Movie Director of the Year	Indie Movie Director of the Year
Winner: **Cathy Garcia Molina** - Hello, Love, Goodbye: Crisanto Aquino -Write About Love; Jade Castro -LSS; Pedring Lopez - Maria; Erik Matti -Kuwaresma; Jun Robles Lana - The Panti Sisters; Jun Robles Lana and Perci Intalan - Unforgettable	Winner: **Brillante Mendoza** - Mindanao: Arden Rod Condez - John Denver Trending; Carlo Ortega Cuevas - Guerrero Dos, Tuloy Ang Laban; Thop Nazareno - Edward; Rae Red - Babae at Baril; Jun Robles Lana - Kalel, 15; Eduardo Roy, Jr. - Lola Igna; J.E. Tiglao - Metamorphosis
Movie Actor of the Year	Movie Actress of the Year
Winner: **Alden Richards** – Hello, Love, Goodbye: Louise Abuel - Edward; Carlo Aquino - Isa Pa With Feelings; Gold Azeron -Metamorphosis; Raymond Bagatsing - Quezon’s Game; Elijah Canlas - Kalel, 15; Jansen Magpusao - John Dever Trending; Aga Muhlach - Miracle In Cell No. 7; Julio Sabenorio -Guerrero Dos, Tuloy Ang Laban	Winner: **Sylvia Sanchez** - Jesusa: Bea Alonzo - Unbreakable; Kathryn Bernardo - Hello, Love, Goodbye; Angie Ferro - Lola Igna; Sarah Geronimo - Unforgettable; Janine Gutierrez - Babae At Baril; Ruby Ruiz - Iska; Judy Ann Santos - Mindanao; Jodi Sta. Maria - Clarita
Movie Supporting Actor of the Year	Movie Supporting Actress of the Year
Winner: **Ricky Davao** - Fuccbois: John Arcilla - Miracle in Cell No. 7; Joem Bascon - Write About Love; Elijah Canlas - Babae At Baril; Arturo De Guzman - Guerrero Dos, Tuloy Ang Laban; Ronnie Lazaro - Maria; JC Santos - Miracle in Cell No. 7; Joel Torre - Miracle in Cell No. 7	Winner: **Maricel Laxa - Hello, Love, Goodbye**: Yayo Aguila - Metamorphosis; Angel Aquino - Kaputol; Ella Cruz - Edward; Jaclyn Jose - Kalel, 15; Gina Pareño - Unforgettable; Meryll Soriano - John Denver Trending; Tuesday Vargas .- LSS
New Movie Actor of the Year	New Movie Actress of the Year
Winner:**David Licauco** - Because I Love You and **Paolo Marcoleta** - Guerrero Dos, Tuloy ang Laban: Louise Abuel - Edward; Royce Cabrera - Fuccbois; Kent Gonzales - Kuwaresma; Jin Macapagal - Damaso; Jansen Magpusao - John Denver Trending	Winner: **Michelle Dee** - Because I Love You: Laura Lehmann - Elise; Cindy Miranda - Adan; Alyssa Muhlach - Clarita; Riva Quenery - Damaso; KZ Tandingan - The Art Of Ligaw; Gillian Vicencio - Eerie; Xia Vigor - Miracle In Cell No. 7
Movie Child Performer of the Year
Winner: **Xia Vigor** - Miracle In Cell No. 7: Miel Espinoza - Elise; Grace Ann Betalmos - Pailalim; Pryle Gura - Iska; Elia Ilano - Ulan; Jorden Suan - Verdict; Yuna Tangog -Mindanao

=== Technical categories ===
Movie Original Screenplay of the Year	Indie Movie Original Screenplay of the Year
Winner: **Cathy Garcia-Molina, Carmi Raymundo and Rona Co** - **Hello, Love, Goodbye**: Crisanto Aquino and Janyx Regalo - Write About Love; Janice Perez and Dean Rosen - Quezon’s Game; Keavy Eunice Vicente and Ash Malanum - Unforgettable; Joel Ferrer and Miko Livelo - Elise; Jun Robles Lana and Ivan Andrew Payawal - The Panti Sisters; Pedring Lopez, Rex Lopez and YZ Carbonell - Maria	Winner: **Arden Rod Condez** - **John Denver Trending**: Carlo Ortega Cuevas - Guerrero Dos, Tuloy Ang Laban; Jun Robles Lana - Kalel, 15; Ricardo Lee - Kaputol; Eduardo Roy, Jr. and Margarette Labrador - Lola Igna; J.E. Tiglao and Boo Dabu - Metamorphosis; Honee Alipio - Mindanao
Movie Cinematographer of the Year	Indie Movie Cinematographer of the Year
Winner: **Noel Teehankee** - **Nuuk**: Neil Daza - Alone / Together; Neil Daza - Write About Love; Mackie Galvez - Unforgettable; Noel Teehankee - Hello, Love, Goodbye; Pao Orendain - Maria; Tom Redoble - Mina Anud	Winner: **Tey Clamor** - **Metamorphosis**: Lav Diaz and Daniel Uy - Kaputol; Odyssey Flores - Mindanao; Carlo Mendoza - Kalel, 15; Kara Moreno - Edward; Rommel Sales - John Denver Trending; Tey Clamor - Babae At Baril
Movie Production Designer of the Year	Indie Movie Production Designer of the Year
Winner: **Brillante Mendoza** - **Mindanao**: Harley Alcasid - John Denver Trending; Donald Russ Camon - Iska; Carmela Danao - Lola Igna; Maolen Fadul - Kalel, 15; Alvin Francisco - Edward; James Arvin Rosendal - Metamorphosis	Winner: **Brillante Mendoza** – **Mindanao**: Harley Alcasid - John Denver Trending; Donald Russ Camon - Iska; Carmela Danao - Lola Igna; Maolen Fadul - Kalel, 15; Alvin Francisco - Edward; Brillante Mendoza - Mindanao; James Arvin Rosendal - Metamorphosis
Movie Editor of the Year	Indie Movie Editor of the Year
Winner: **Vanessa De Leon** - **Write About Love**: Renewin Alano - Elise; Reuben Joseph Aquino - Quezon’s Game; Jason Cahapay - Maria; Jeremiah Domingo - LSS; Marya Ignacio - Hello, Love, Goodbye; Tara Illenberger - The Panti Sisters	Winner: **Benjo Ferrer** - **John Denver Trending**: Joyce Bernal, JR Cabrera and Thop Nazareno - Edward; Diego Marx Dobles - Mindanao; Ilsa Malsi - Babae At Baril; Carlo Francisco Manatad - Fuccbois; Carlo Francisco Manatad - Lola Igna; Renard Torres - Metamorphosis
Movie Musical Scorer of the Year	Indie Movie Musical Scorer of the Year
Winner: **Pat Lasaten** - **LSS**: Jessie Lasaten - Hello, Love, Goodbye; Jessie Lasaten - Nuuk; Paulo Protacio - Just A Stranger; Dean Rosen - Quezon’s Game; Jerrold Tarog - Write About Love; Emerzon Texon - Unforgettable	Winner: **Teresa Barrozo** - **Mindanao**: Len Calvo - John Denver Trending; Divino Dayacap - Metamorphosis; Andrew Florentino - Lola Igna; Pepe Manikan - Edward; Abet Alfonso - Guerrero Dos, Tuloy Ang Laban; Fatima Nerikka Salim and Immanuel Verona - Babae At Baril
Movie Sound Engineer of the Year	Indie Movie Sound Engineer of the Year
Winner: **Albert Michael Idioma and Alex Tomboc** - **Maria**: Anglea Pereyra - Quezon’s Game; Arnel Labayo and Aurel Bilbao - LSS; Corinne De San Jose - Unforgettable; Allen Roy Santos - Clarita; Immanuel Verona - Eerie; Steve Vesagas, Pau Javier, Whannie Dellosa - Kuwaresma	Winner: **Fatima Nerrika Salim and Immanuel Verona** - **Babae At Baril**: Armand De Guzman - Lola Igna; Bryan Dumaguina - Watch Me Kill; Albert Michael Idioma - Kalel, 15; Albert Michael Idioma - Pailalim; Mikko Quizon and Kat Salinas - John Denver Trending; Immanuel Verona - Metamorphosis
Movie Original Theme Song of the Year	Indie Movie Original Theme Song of the Year
Winner: **“Araw-Araw”** - **LSS** Composed and arranged by Ben & Ben Interpreted by Ben & Ben: “Ikaw Ang Akin” - (Write About Love) Lyrics by Crisanto Aquino. Composed by Lloyd Tiny Corpuz, Arranged by Raizo Chabeldin and Interpreted by Yeng Constantino; “Isang Himala” - (Miracle In Cell No. 7) Composed by Miguel Mendoza, Arranged by Arnold Buena, Interpreted by Katrina Velarde; “Magkaibang Mundo” - (Just A Stranger), Music and lyrics by Sean CedroArranged by Arnold Buena, Interpreted by Katrina Velarde; “Maria” - (Maria), Lyrics by Bones Frankenstein, Composed by Bones Frankenstein, Alvin Chan, Karl Kliatchko, Aldreen Alcantara and Interpreted by Mr. Bones and The Boneyard Circus; “Pansamantala” - (Elise), Composed by Tenten Abella and Paul Puti-an and Interpreted by Paul Puti-an; “Unbreakable” - (Unbreakable), Composed by Trisha Denise, Jonathan Manalo, Vanessa Valdez. Arranged by Arnold Buena and Interpreted by Regine Velasquez and Moira Dela Torre; “Ang Tangi Kong Pangarap” - (Unforgettable), Composed by Rico Blanco; Arranged by Choi Padilla and Interpreted by Sarah Geronimo	Winner: **Walang Katulad”** - **Immaculada**, Lyrics by Arlyn Dela Cruz-Bernal, Music by Ms. Elizabeth Oropesa. Arranged by Karl Ramirez with Earlmond Ross Lee and Interpreted by Ima Castro: “Hintay Lang” - (Sila-Sila). Composed and arranged by Aeron Jore and Interpreted by Aeron Jore; “Kaibigan” - (Kaibigan). Lyrics and music by Vehnee Saturno and Arranged by Elmer Blancaflor. Interpreted by Perkins Twins; “Kasunduan” - (Watch Me Kill). Composed by Riki Bolalin. Arranged by Skip Saturday and Interpreted by Skip Saturday; “Mayroon Bang Pagbabago” - (Damaso). Composed by Joven Tan. Arranged by Paulo Zarate and Interpreted by Marlo Mortel; "Quicksand” (The Art Of Ligaw). Words and music by KZ Tandingan. Arranged by Arnold Buena and Interpreted by KZ Tandingan; “Tuloy Ang Laban” (Guerrero Dos, Tuloy Ang Laban). Composed by Carlo Ortega Cuevas and Rapido Guerrero. Arranged by Marlon Barnuevo and Interpreted by Carlo Ortega Cuevas and Rapido Guerrero

=== Short Films ===
Short Film Movie of the Year	Short Film Movie Director of the Year
Winner: **“Forever”** - (Adlibs Entertainment Corp., Institute of the Moving Image, Bandido Media Productions): “Hele Ng Maharlika” (Newtown Pictures); “Kalakalaro” (What If? Productions); “Memories Of The Rising Sun” (Pelikulaw and College of Saint Benilde); “Panaghoy” (ABP Films and Memorya); “Para Kay James” (Oktopus Productions); “Tembong” (UP Film Production and UP Cinema); “Tokwifi” (Balay Habi Studio and QCinema)	Winner: '**Domingo Molina**- **Forever**: Shaira Advincula - Tembong; Alvin Baloloy - Panaghoy; Norvin Delos Santos - Hele Ng Maharlika; Steven Paul Evangelio - Para Kay James; Lawrence Fajardo - Memories Of The Rising Sun; Carla Pulido Ocampo - Tokwifi; Rodson Suarez -Kalakalaro

=== Special awards ===
Darling of the Press	Movie Loveteam of the Year
Winner: **Joed Serrano**: Gretchen Barretto; Liza Diño-Seguerra; Piolo Pascual; Ahwel Paz; Ramon “Bong” Revilla, Jr.; Sylvia Sanchez; Alfred Vargas	Winner: **Kathryn Bernado** and **Alden Richards** for Hello, Love, Goodbye: Liza Soberano and Enrique Gil (Alone / Together); Julia Barretto and Gerald Anderson (Between Maybes); Gabbi Garcia and Khalil Ramos (LSS); Maine Mendoza and Carlo Aquino (Isa Pa With Feelings); Nadine Lustre and Carlo Aquino (Ulan); Janine Gutierrez and Enchong Dee (Elise); Anne Curtis and Marco Gumabao (Just A Stranger)

- Nora Aunor Ulirang Artista Lifetime Achievement Award: **Angie Ferro**
- Ulirang Alagad ng Pelikula sa Likod ng Kamera Lifetime Achievement Award: **Elwood Perez**
