= 2020 FAMAS Awards =

Awarding ceremony given by the Filipino Academy of Movie Arts and Sciences

68th FAMAS Awards
- Date: December 20, 2020
- Site: Seda Vertis North, Quezon City, Metro Manila, Philippines
- Hosted by: Christian Bables and Jasmine Curtis-Smith

Highlights
- Best Picture: Aswang
- Most awards: Aswang (4) Babae at Baril (4)
- Most nominations: Kalel, 15 (9)

The 68th Filipino Academy of Movie Arts and Sciences (FAMAS) Awards was an awarding ceremony given by the Filipino Academy of Movie Arts and Sciences (FAMAS), an organization composed of prize-winning writers and movie columnists, giving recognition to the Philippine mainstream and independent films, actors, actresses, directors and production staffs for their achievements in the year 2019.

The nominations were announced on December 6, 2020 through the newly launched FAMAS Digital Philippines. Due to the COVID-19 pandemic, the typical awards night ceremony was replaced by a virtual announcement of winners. For the first time, the organization partnered up with IFLIX and WeTV Philippines to broadcast the pre-recorded announcement through online platforms like YouTube, Facebook, Instagram and X (formerly known as Twitter) to reach more audience.

For the first time in the history of this award-giving body, the Best Picture winner was a documentary film.

== Awards ==
Winners are listed first and highlighted with boldface.

Best Picture	Best Director
**Aswang**; Babae at Baril; Cleaners; John Denver Trending; Kalel, 15; Verdict	**Raymund Ribay Gutierrez – Verdict**; Arden Rod Condez – John Denver Trending; Glenn Barit – Cleaners; Jet Leyco – For My Alien Friend; Jun Lana – Kalel, 15; Rae Red – Babae at Baril
Best Actor	Best Actress
**Elijah Canlas – Kalel, 15 as Kalel Fernandez**; **Kristoffer King – Verdict as Dante Santos**; Alden Richards – Hello, Love, Goodbye as Ethan Del Rosario; Gold Aceron – Metamorphosis as Adam; Jansen Magpusao – John Denver Trending as John Denver Cabungcal; Nar Cabico – Akin ang Korona as Nanong	**Janine Gutierrez – Babae at Baril as Babae**; Angela Cortez – Jino to Mari as Marie; Bela Padilla – Mañanita as Edilberta; Jean Garcia – Watch Me Kill as Luciana; Kathryn Bernardo – Hello, Love, Goodbye as Joy Marie Fabregas; Nadine Lustre – Ulan as Maya
Best Supporting Actor	Best Supporting Actress
**Ricky Davao – Fuccbois as Mayor Fernan**; Boo Gabunada – Sila-Sila as Stranger; JC Santos – Babae at Baril as Miguel; Phi Palmos – Akin ang Korona as Pia; Topper Fabregas – Sila-Sila as Jared	**Dolly de Leon – Verdict as Elsa**; Cherie Gil – Kaputol as Kiki; Ella Cruz – Edward as Agnes; Meryll Soriano – John Denver Trending as Marites Cabungcal; Yayo Aguila – Metamorphosis as Elena
Best Screenplay	Best Documentary Film
**Glenn Barit – Cleaners**; Daniel Saniana – Sila-Sila; Jun Lana – Kalel, 15; Rae Red – Babae at Baril; Raymund Ribay Gutierrez – Verdict	**Aswang – Alyx Ayn G. Arumpac**; A Is for Agustin – Grace Simbulan; For My Alien Friend – Jet Leyco
Best Cinematography	Best Production Design
**Alyx Ayn G. Arumpac & Tanya Haurylchyk – Aswang**; **Tey Clamor – Babae at Baril**; Carlo Mendoza – Kalel, 15; Neil Daza – Ulan; Odyssey Flores – Mañanita	**Eero Yves Francisco – Babae at Baril**; Alvin Francisco – Edward; Carmela Danao – Lola Igna; Ferdie Abuel – Ulan; Maolen Fadul – Kalel, 15
Best Editing	Best Sound
**Fatima Bianchi & Anne Fabini – Aswang**; Benjamin Gonzales Tolentino – Kalel, 15; Carlo Francisco Manatad – Fuccbois; Che Tagyamon & Noah Loyola – Cleaners; Jet Leyco & Brian Gonzales – For My Alien Friend; Marya Ignacio – Hello, Love, Goodbye	**Jet Leyco & Brian Gonzales – For My Alien Friend**; Albert Michael Idioma, Aian Caro & Lamberto Casas Jr. – Kalel, 15; Bryan Dumaguina – Watch Me Kill; Immanuel Verona – Clarita; Jason Conanan, Vince Jan Banta, Rj Cantos & Mikko Quizon – Ulan; Mikko Quizon, John Michael Perez & Akritchalerm Kalayanamitr – Aswang
Best Musical Score	Best Short Film
**Fatima Nerikka Salim & Immanuel Verona – Babae at Baril**; Glenn Barit – Cleaners; Jessie Lasaten – Hello, Love, Goodbye; Richard Gonzales – Jino to Mari; Teresa Barrozo – Kalel, 15	**Tokwifi – Carla Pulido Ocampo**; Ascending – Sophia Isip; Biyaheng Pa-Kalayaan Ave, na-EDSAng Letse – Lem Garcellano; Budots: The Craze – Jay Rosas & Mark Limbaga; Disconnection Notice – Glenn Averia; Here, Here – Joanne Cesario; Judy Free – Che Tagyamon; Michel de Certeau's Metaphor for Everyday Life – Noli Manaig; Plus. Minus. – Lester Cristal, Lourel San Pablo & Romeo Gapuz; The Shoemaker – Sheron R. Dayoc & Sonny Calvento

== Special awards ==
Advocacy Film Award

- Neal 'Buboy' Tan

Dolphy King of Comedy Award

- Pokwang

Dr. Jose Perez Memorial Award

- Boy Abunda

FAMAS Lifetime Achievement Award

- Armida Siguion-Reyna
- Ricky Lee
- Roxlee

Fernando Poe, Jr. Award

- Angel Locsin

German Moreno Youth Achievement Award

- Liza Soberano
- Matteo Guidicelli

=== FAMAS Netizens' Choice ===
Best Picture: Babae at Baril

Best Actor: Elijah Canlas

Best Actress: Nadine Lustre

== Stats ==
	Nominations	Wins
Kalel, 15	9	1
Babae at Baril	8	4
Aswang	5	4
Verdict	5	3
Cleaners	5	1
For My Alien Friend	4	1
Hello, Love, Goodbye	4	0
John Denver Trending	4	0
Ulan	4	0
Sila-Sila	3	0
Fuccbois	2	1
Akin ang Korona	2	0
Edward	2	0
Jino to Mari	2	0
Mañanita	2	0
Metamorphosis	2	0
Watch Me Kill	2	0
A Is for Agustin	1	0
Clarita	1	0
Kaputol	1	0
Lola Igna	1	0
