= List of schools in Bacoor =

This is a list of schools in Bacoor, Cavite, Philippines.

== Public schools ==
=== Elementary schools ===
- Aniban Elementary School
- Bacoor Elementary School
- Bayanan Elementary School
- Bayanan Progressive Senior High School (Progressive Village 3, Barangay Bayanan)
- Boase Public school
- Digman Elementary School
- Dulong Bayan Elementary School
- Gawaran Elementary School
- Gov. P.F. Espiritu Elementary School
- Habay Elementary School
- Ligas Elementary School
- Ligas II Elementary School
- Likha Elementary School
- Longos Elementary School
- Mabolo Elementary School
- Maliksi Elementary School
- Malipay Elementary School
- Mambog Elementary School
- Molino Elementary School
- Molino 2 Progressive Elementary School
- Niog Elementary School
- Poblacion Elementary School
- Progressive Elementary School
- Queens Row Elementary School
- Real Elementary School
- Salinas Elementary School
- San Nicolas Elementary School
- Sineguelasan Elementary School
- Soldiers Hills Elementary School
- Talaba Elementary School
- Zapote Elementary School

=== Secondary schools ===
- Bacoor National High School - Gawaran Annex
- Bacoor National High School - Main, Molino I
- Bacoor National High School - Villa Maria Annex, Molino III
- Bayanan Progressive Senior High School (Progressive Village 3)
- City of Bacoor National High School - Georgetown Annex, Molino IV
- City of Bacoor National High School - Salinas Annex, Salinas II
- City of Bacoor National High School - San Nicolas Annex, San Nicolas III
- City of Bacoor National High School - Springville Annex, Molino III
- Eastern Bacoor National High School, Queens Row
- Mariano Gomes National High School (formerly Bacoor National High School - Tabing Dagat Annex) (Note: Established as an independent school through Republic Act No. 11946, an act separating the Bacoor National High School – Tabing Dagat Annex and converting it into Mariano Gomes National High School, which was signed into law in 2023.)
- Responsible Village Leaders Learning Academy (REVILLA) High School, Maliksi I

=== Tertiary schools ===
- Cavite State University - Bacoor Campus

== Private schools ==
=== Secondary schools ===
- Academia De Covina
- Academy for Christian Education
- Academy of Gentle Potter's Children
- AMA Computer Learning Center
- Angelicum Immanuel Montessori of Cavite
- APEC Schools - Bacoor
- Arcland school of Cavite
- Asian Institute of Computer Studies – Bacoor (also offer some college courses)
- Bacoor Parish School
- Bacoor Parochial School of St. Michael the Archangel
- Bacoor Sheperd School
- Bacoor Unida Evangelical School
- Bearer of Light and Wisdom Colleges
- Benedictine School of Cavite
- Bristle Oak Academy
- Bueno De Meraniel's Learning Institute
- Casa De San Miguel Montessori School
- Cavite Bible Baptist Academy- Bacoor Branch
- Cavite Christian School
- Cavite School of Life - Bacoor
- Cavite School of St. Mark
- Chain of Wisdom Colleges of Cavite (formerly Chain of Wisdom House of Learning)
- Christian Values School
- Crest View Academy of Cavite
- Crossroads Christian Academy
- Diamond Academy
- Divine Jesus Learning Center
- Divine Light Academy
- Dunamis of Wisdom Christian School
- Don Stevens Institute of Cavite
- Erica Learning Center
- First Books Learning Center
- Five Star Standard College
- God's Grace Christian School
- Graceland Academy
- Green Valley Academy
- GudNad Academe
- Harrell Horne Integrated School
- Higher Ground Academy
- Imus Computer College - Bacoor Branch
- INA Internet Learning Center
- John Paul Montessori School
- Joseph Immanuel School
- Jubileum Academy of Bacoor
- King James Academy - Cavite
- King Solomon Integrated School
- La Camelle School
- La Vlaize Integrated Science School - Bacoor Branch
- Little Angels Learning School
- Little Angels Montessori School
- Love Christian Academy
- Macasa Learning Center
- Marella Christian Institute
- Marie Osmund Schools
- Marvelous Faith Academy of Bacoor
- Marville Center Of Education
- Millennium Christian High School of Cavite
- Mizpah Community Academy Foundation
- Montessori dei San Lorenzo
- Mother Theresa School - Main
- Newville Heights Academy
- Norquins Living Legacy Academy
- Our Lady of Lourdes Academy of Bacoor Cavite
- The Palmridge School
- Peak Hills School
- Phoenix International School of Science and Technology
- Pillars of God Academy of Bacoor
- Pimsat College Bacoor Cavite
- Queen's Row Integrated Science School
- Quest Academy
- Rochepol Jane Academy
- Ruther E. Esconde School of Multiple Intelligences
- School of St. Mark
- Seven Seas Academy
- St. Alphonsus Liguori Integrated School
- St. Clare de Molino Academy
- St. Francis Institute, Learning and Business High School
- St. Jerome Emiliani Institute
- St. John Fisher School
- St. Matthew Academy of Cavite
- St. Michael's Institute
- St. Peregrine Institute
- St. Thomas More Academy
- St. Vincent De Paul College
- Statefields School
- Technology Integrated Montessori of Meadowood
- Theos Learning Center
- Theresian School of Cavite
- Victorious Christian Montessori - Bacoor
- Villa Cecilia Academy of Arts and Technology
- Waynesville Learning Center
- Young Shepherd's School

=== Tertiary schools ===
- International School of Hotel and Restaurant Management
- St. Dominic College of Asia
- St. Francis of Assisi College - Bacoor
- STI College Bacoor
- University of Perpetual Help System DALTA - Molino Campus
- Woodridge College
