= Paano ang Pangako? =

Philippine television drama

- Title card
- Genre: Drama; Christmas drama Romance
- Created by: Jun Robles Lana
- Written by: Keavy Eunice Vicente; Ash Malanum; Fatrick Tabada; Shane David; Tonio M. Rodulfo
- Directed by: Enrico Quizon; Ricky Davao; Perci Intalan
- Creative director: Jun Robles Lana
- Starring: Maricel Laxa; Ricky Davao; Allan Paule; Bing Loyzaga; Beauty Gonzalez; Julia Clarete; Ejay Falcon; Devon Seron; Elijah Canlas; Miles Ocampo; Matt Evans; Danita Paner; John Sweet Lapus; Ahron Villena; Kyle Velino; Cedrick Juan; Justine Buenaflor
- Opening theme: “Pasko Na, Sinta Ko," by Jona (season 1, as Paano ang Pasko?) "Pangako Sa'Yo" by Sheryn Regis (season 2, as Paano Ang Pangako?)
- Composers: Rey Valera; Francis Dandan; Aurelio Estanislao
- Country of origin: Philippines
- Original language: Filipino
- No. of seasons: 2
- No. of episodes: 93 + 1 marathon episode

Production
- Executive producers: Robert P. Galang; Jun Robles Lana; Perci Intalan
- Producers: Sienna G. Olaso; Isabel A. Santillan
- Production location: San Pablo City, Laguna
- Camera setup: Multiple-camera setup
- Running time: 30 minutes (2020-2021); 45 minutes (2021)
- Production companies: TV5 Entertainment; Cignal Entertainment; The IdeaFirst Company

Original release
- Network: TV5
- Release: November 23, 2020 – April 3, 2021

Paano ang Pangako? (transl. how about the promise?), formerly titled as Paano ang Pasko?, (transl. how about the christmas?) is a 2020 Philippine television drama series broadcast on TV5. Directed by Enrico Quizon, Ricky Davao, and Perci Intalan, it stars Maricel Laxa, Ricky Davao, Allan Paule, Bing Loyzaga, Beauty Gonzalez, Julia Clarete, Ejay Falcon, Devon Seron, Elijah Canlas, Miles Ocampo, Matt Evans, Danita Paner, John Lapus, Ahron Villena, Kyle Velino, Cedrick Juan and Justine Buenaflor. It aired as Paano ang Pasko? from November 23, 2020 to January 1, 2021. The show was renamed Paano ang Pangako? from January 4 to April 3, 2021, and was replaced by Niña Niño.

== Plot ==
=== Season 1 (Paano ang Pasko?) ===
The Aguinaldos have planned out to a sincere spirit of christmas despite the pandemic began their lives as part together, in the cohersive shocks to their family.

=== Season 2 (Paano ang Pangako?) ===
The secrets and scandals in the Aguinaldo family, led by matriarch Faith, get more complicated as a new family threatens to upend their lives. The arrival of the Dominante-Cruz family helmed by its matriarch Elvira, takes an interesting twist as she vows to strip the Aguinaldo’s of their everything – wealth, honor, and heir.

== Cast and characters ==
=== Main cast ===
- Maricel Laxa as Faith Aguinaldo
- Ricky Davao † as Joselito "Jose" Quinto †
- Allan Paule as Antonio "Anton" Aguinaldo †
- Bing Loyzaga as Doña Elvira Dominante-Cruz †
- Beauty Gonzalez as Hope Aguinaldo
- Julia Clarete as Love Aguinaldo-Robles †
- Devon Seron as Joy Aguinaldo
- Elijah Canlas as Noel Aguinaldo
- Ejay Falcon as Carl Robles
- John Lapus as Manang Kitty / Paquito
- Karel Marquez as Karen Dominante-Cruz
- Miles Ocampo as Isabel
- Matt Evans as Eric
- Danita Paner / Adrianna So as Andi
- Ahron Villena as Luis
- Cedrick Juan as Alex
- Kyle Velino as Drake
- Justine Buenaflor as Mylene
- Ace Ismael as Dean

=== Supporting cast ===
- Desiree del Valle as Natalie Wilson
- Mel Martinez as Tamisha
- Ayeesha Cervantes as Trisha
- Gilleth Sandico as Jessica
- Zandra Summer as Samantha
- Bobby Andrews as Richard Dominante-Cruz †
- Ramon Christopher as Fernan Dominante-Cruz †
- Patricia Ismael as Carrie †
