= Iana Bernardez =

Filipino film producer and actress

- Born: Iana Celest Aquino Bernardez; Baguio, Philippines
- Other name: Ian Celest Bernardez
- Occupations: Actress, film producer
- Years active: 2017–present
- Notable work: Marry Me, Marry You, Pamilya Sagrado
- Height: 5 ft 2 in (157 cm) tall
- Parents: Ian Bernardez (father); Angel Aquino (mother)
- Website: Iana Bernardez on Instagram

Iana Celest Aquino Bernardez is a Filipino film producer and actress known for her production work on films such as Kiko Boksingero, Oda Sa Wala, Tia Madre, and Babae at Baril and for her critically acclaimed film acting debut in the 2018 film Gusto Kita with All My Hypothalamus. She also won Best Supporting Actress at the 2019 Cinema One Originals Digital Film Festival for the 2019 film Metamorphosis. She is the daughter of Filipina actress Angel Aquino.

== Early life and education ==
Iana Celest Aquino Bernardez was born on July 3, 1993, in Baguio City, Philippines, to actress Angel Aquino. Growing up with a mother in the entertainment industry, Bernardez was exposed to film production from a young age. She pursued a degree in psychology at Ateneo de Manila University, with no initial plans to pursue acting. However, her career path shifted when she was given the script for Gusto Kita With All My Hypothalamus, where she started as a talent coordinator before ultimately landing a role in the film.

== Career ==
=== Production work ===
Bernardez began her career in production, having become curious about her work through her interactions on the sets of projects where her mother acted. She continues to see herself primarily as a producer rather than an actress. Her early production work on films like films such as Kiko Boksingero and Babae at Baril received critical acclaim. The latter was eventually awarded Best Film at the 43rd Gawad Urian Awards in 2020.

=== Acting work ===
Bernardez made her acting debut in Gusto Kita with All My Hypothalamus, securing a major role despite initially joining the film as a talent coordinator. After the production team discovered she was the inspiration for the character, which was conceived as a younger version of Bernardez’s own mother, they encouraged her to audition. Early in her career, Bernardez often took on additional roles for minimal pay in films she produced to help reduce costs. Her mother eventually advised her to stop this practice, as Bernardez had gained substantial acting experience by then.

In 2019, Bernardez won the Cinema One Originals Best Supporting Actress award for her role in Metamorphosis, an intersex coming-of-age film. The film faced controversy when the Movie and Television Review and Classification Board (MTRCB) initially proposed an X rating, but after an appeal, the film was ultimately given an R-16 rating.

In 2021, Bernardez Philippine television drama series Marry Me, Marry You, played Patricia Francisco, marking her main antagonist.

In the 2024, Bernardez political drama thriller series Pamilya Sagrado, played Melanie Salvacion, a resilient supporting character tied closely to the main conflict.

== Personal life ==
Bernardez is bisexual. She was in a three-year relationship with her female schoolmate.

== Filmography ==
=== Film ===
| Year | Title | Role |
|---|---|---|
| 2017 | Chedeng and Apple | Rannie's wife |
| 2018 | Mr. & Mrs. Cruz | Jane |
| 2018 | Gusto Kita with All My Hypothalamus | Aileen |
| 2018 | Kuya Wes | Receptionist |
| 2018 | Pinay Beauty | Makeup Artist |
| 2018 | Oda sa Wala | Elmer's wife |
| 2018 | Ma | Cave Voice |
| 2019 | Metamorphosis | Angel |
| 2019 | The Girl and the Gun | Woman in Bus |
| 2019 | Tía Madré | |
| 2019 | Hellcome Home | Teresa |
| 2019 | LSS | Cha |
| 2020 | Alter Me | Giselle |
| 2022 | Ngayon Kaya | Anastasia |
| 2022 | Mahal Kita, Beksman | Angel |
| 2022 | An Inconvenient Love | Kookie |
| 2023 | Ten Little Mistresses (Sampung mga Kerida) | Coco |
| 2023 | Death by Desire | Nikki |
| 2023 | Animal Lovers | |
| 2024 | I Am Not Big Bird | Saleslady |
| 2025 | Cinemartyrs | Vangie |
| 2025 | Flower Girl | New Shout Model |
| 2026 | Ria | |

=== Television / Digital series ===
| Year | Title | Role |
|---|---|---|
| 2019 | Past, Present, Perfect | Vivian |
| 2021 | Love vs Stars | Cara |
| 2021 | Case Files: Obra Macabra | Agent Samantha Olivar |
| 2021 | Now Streaming | Fatima / Meditation Instructor / Irene |
| 2021–2022 | Marry Me, Marry You | Patricia Francisco |
| 2022 | Miss Piggy | |
| 2023 | Fit Check: Confessions of an Ukay Queen | young Georgina |
| 2023 | Unbreak My Heart | Jennifer "Jenny" Antonio / Jessica "Jessa" Antonio |
| 2024 | Pamilya Sagrado | Melanie Salvacion |
| 2024–present | ASAP XP | Herself / Performer |
| 2025 | Happy Crush | Carmela |
| 2025 | How to Cheat Death | |
| 2025–2026 | Roja | Mila Sebastian |
| 2025–2026 | The Alibi | young Rebecca Morales |

== Accolades ==
Awards and NominationsAwards and nominations received by Iana Bernardez
| Award | Year | Category | Nominated work | Result | Ref. |
|---|---|---|---|---|---|
| CineFilipino Film Festival | 2018 | Best Actress | Gusto Kita with All My Hypothalamus | Nominated | |
| CineFilipino Film Festival | 2018 | Best Ensemble (shared with Nicco Manalo, Dylan Ray Talon, Soliman Cruz, Anthony Falcon) | Gusto Kita with All My Hypothalamus | Won | |
| Cinema One Originals Digital Film Festival | 2019 | Best Supporting Actress | Metamorphosis | Won | |
| Pista ng Pelikulang Pilipino | 2020 | Best Supporting Actress | Metamorphosis | Nominated | |
| PMPC Star Awards for Movies | 2019 | New Movie Actress of the Year | Gusto Kita with All My Hypothalamus | Nominated | |
| Singapore International Film Festival | 2024 | Best Performance - Southeast Asian Short Film | Animal Lovers | Nominated | |
