= Sisa (2025 film) =

2025 thriller drama film by Jun Robles Lana

- Theatrical release poster
- Directed by: Jun Robles Lana
- Written by: Jun Robles Lana
- Produced by: Jun Robles Lana; Perci M. Intalan; Josabeth V. Alonso
- Starring: Hilda Koronel
- Cinematography: Carlo C. Mendoza
- Edited by: Lawrence S. Ang
- Music by: Teresa Barrozo
- Production companies: The IdeaFirst Company; October Train Films; Quantum Films; Cineko Productions; CMB Films; Forever Group
- Release dates: 20 November 2025 (PÖFF); 4 March 2026 (Philippines)
- Running time: 115 minutes
- Countries: Philippines; Myanmar
- Language: Filipino

Sisa is a 2025 historical thriller drama film written, co-produced, and directed by Jun Robles Lana. It stars Hilda Koronel in her comeback film after her 13-year hiatus, with the supporting cast including Eugene Domingo, Jennica Garcia, Tanya Gomez, Barbara Miguel, and Romnick Sarmenta. Set during the last years of the Philippine-American War, the film follows a woman who went insane after seeing the aftermath of the carnage caused by the American forces, but unknown to them, this pretense is just an act of revenge.

A co-production of The IdeaFirst Company, October Train Films, Quantum Films, Cineko Productions, CMB Films, and Myanmar-based Forever Group, the film had its world premiere on 20 November 2025, at the 29th Tallinn Black Nights Film Festival in Estonia, where it is part of the "Official Selection - Competition" category. It was given a Philippine theatrical premiere on 4 March 2026.

== Plot ==
During the Philippine-American War, American forces displaced Filipino villagers into concentration camps to isolate Filipino revolutionaries and induce their surrender. In 1902, a madwoman wanders into a camp watchtower guarded by American sentry Smith. Upon interrogation by the camp's commander, Harrison, the woman cannot recall her name or origin. The camp's American teacher, Miss Warren, orders a student, Nena, and her mother, Delia, to take the madwoman in. Upon Nena's suggestion, the madwoman is named Sisa, after one of the characters in José Rizal's novel Noli Me Tángere. Sisa, whose real name is never divulged, is actually feigning insanity as part of her mission as a spy for the revolutionary forces led by her brother-in-law Artemio. In flashbacks, it is revealed that Sisa was a former zarzuela actress who joined the revolutionaries after her family was massacred by American soldiers. She is tasked with infiltrating the camp in preparation for an upcoming attack by Artemio's troops.

Sisa acquaints herself with the camp's residents, starting with Delia, whose husband and children, except Nena, were killed by the Americans. Sisa discovers that the adolescent Nena is concealing an affair with the much-older Smith, who, in turn, is later discovered by Nena to be having an affair with Miss Warren. Sisa reveals herself to Opel, the wife of a cabeza de barangay arrested by the Americans for colluding with the revolutionaries, and tells her to rouse the villagers against the Americans and find a weapons cache left behind by the revolutionaries. Sisa also becomes friends with Leonor, a pro-American sympathizer and Harrison's mistress, who is ostracized by the community. Leonor unwittingly divulges military secrets to Sisa, including the impending arrival of members of the Taft Commission on the day of Artemio's attack. Sisa passes the information to the revolutionaries through a coachman, Santiago.

After a ball organized by Miss Warren, Leonor is found badly beaten and raped at her hut. As the villagers help her, she recalls that she was raped after being escorted home by Harrison's soldiers, causing her to distrust the Americans and join Sisa's cause. Delia attacks Smith's watchtower with an axe after learning that he had impregnated Nena. Smith shoots at Delia, but instead kills Nena by mistake. Harrison asks the villagers in Spanish about the circumstances of Nena's death, but disparages them after failing to find someone who can speak the language. An enraged Sisa replies to Harrison directly, leading her to reveal her true identity to Delia and the villagers. At Nena's funeral, Sisa and Opel convince the villagers to aid Artemio's attack.

The camp's womenfolk are ordered by Miss Warren to prepare food for the commissioners' visit to the camp barracks. However, Sisa is alarmed after Miss Warren says there are more guests than expected. Sisa talks to Santiago, but is interrupted by the arrival of the commissioners, accompanied by Artemio and his surrendering forces. At the subsequent feast, Artemio explains to Sisa that they surrendered after realizing that resistance was futile and availed of an amnesty issued by the Americans, but Sisa rebukes him for capitulating despite the atrocities done to his family. Artemio nearly blows Sisa's cover by revealing her acting career to Harrison.

Sisa goes outside to remonstrate with Santiago, but the latter justifies the surrender by invoking Filipino atrocities and reveals that he was actually Leonor's rapist. Leonor, Delia, and other women overhear Santiago and join Sisa in lynching him and hiding his body before returning to the kitchen. Leonor tries to squeal to Harrison, prompting Sisa to reluctantly kill her using rat poison in front of the other women. Sisa and the other women then poison the guests, including the surrenderees, for betraying their homeland, and tell those unable to help to evacuate the camp along with the remaining villagers. As the attendees collapse, the women pour gasoline all over the dining hall before gathering around Sisa as she holds a gas lamp.

== Cast ==
- Hilda Koronel as Sisa
- Eugene Domingo as Delia, one of the camp residents who is the mother of Nena.
- Jennica Garcia as Leonor, one of the camp residents who is Harrison's mistress.
- Tanya Gomez as Opel
- Angellie Sanoy as Nena: Delia's daughter.
- Barbara Miguel as Rita
- Jorrybell Agoto as Cedes
- Janina Mendoza as Gloria
- Nico Antonio as Santiago
- Romnick Sarmienta as General Artemio
- Kuya Manzano as Commander Eddie Harrison
- Isabel Lamers as Miss Warren, an American teacher.
- Kobie Brown as Smith

== Production ==
Lana conceived the film following his interest in the American occupation of the Philippines, adding that it was inspired by the Balangiga massacre in 1902 and the historical role of Filipino women such as Agueda Kahabagan during the Philippine-American War. He also saw Sisa as the second in a trilogy of historical sociopolitical films following the 2013 martial law film Barber's Tales.

It is a co-production of The IdeaFirst Company, October Train Films, Quantum Films, Cineko Productions, CMB Films, and Myanmar-based Forever Group. Carlo Canlas Mendoza served as a cinematographer.

=== Casting ===
The idea to include Hilda Koronel in the film was suggested to Jun Robles Lana by fellow director Perci Intalan. The film is Koronel's first acting role since she last appeared in The Mistress in 2012.

=== Filming ===
Principal photography commenced in the second week of January 2025, coinciding with the release of the first-look photo featuring lead star Hilda Koronel. Location shooting was held in Tarlac. Filming was completed on 16 March 2025.

== Release ==
The film had its world premiere on 20 November 2025, at the 29th Tallinn Black Nights Film Festival in Estonia, where it is part of the "Official Selection - Competition" category. It was given a Philippine theatrical premiere on 4 March 2026. That same day, the film was included by the QCinema International Film Festival in a series of special screenings to commemorate National Women’s Month at the Gateway Mall in Quezon City.

== Reception ==
=== Critical response ===
Ralph Revelar Sarza, writing for ABS-CBN, noted the film's focus on psychological aspects rather than military conflict itself. He also praised the film's cinematography and performances by Koronel and Domingo, although he felt the latter's performance was restrained. He criticized Garcia's performance as being more appropriate for a theater production rather than a film, as well as the performances by the American characters. In a review for PEP.ph, Mark Angelo Ching praised the film's cinematography and the performances of Koronel, Domingo, Sanoy, Garcia, and Brown, but criticized the climax for ending on a cliffhanger.

Nicol Latayan, writing for International Cinephile Society, gave a positive review, stating that the film is the spiritual companion of the director's earlier work, Barber's Tales, where "lead characters taking matters into their own hands in a broken society that constantly tests them". She also praised Koronel's acting efforts, where she played the titular character "with a balance of grit and grace, her eyes channeling both the pain and rage of her situation as well as the courage and conviction needed to carry out her plan".

Marko Stojiljković, writing for Asian Movie Pulse, was critical of the film, describing it as a "highly underwhelming experience". Nonetheless, he praised Hilda Koronel and Isabel Lamers's acting performances, amidst some of the cast being criticized for "amateurish acting" and Carlo Mendoza's cinematography, which evoked backdrops that are similar to Westerns and war films.

=== Accolades ===
Accolades received by Sisa
Award-giving organization/Festival	Category	Recipient(s)	Result	Ref.
46th Fantasporto International Film Festival	Best Screenplay (Director's Week)	Sisa, written by Jun Robles Lana	Won	
