= Metamorphosis (2019 Philippine film) =

- Directed by: J.E. Tiglao
- Written by: J.E. Tiglao; Boo Dabu
- Produced by: J.E. Tiglao; Bella Tiglao
- Starring: Gold Azeron; Iana Bernardez; Yayo Aguila; Germaine De Leon; Ricky Davao
- Cinematography: Tey Clamor
- Edited by: Renard Torres
- Music by: Divino Dayacap
- Production company: Cinema One Originals
- Distributed by: Creative Programs; Solar Entertainment Corporation
- Release date: 8 November 2019 (Cinema One Originals)
- Running time: 98 minutes
- Country: Philippines
- Languages: Tagalog; Filipino

Metamorphosis is a 2019 Philippine coming-of-age drama film directed by J.E. Tiglao, starring Gold Azeron, Iana Bernardez, Yayo Aguila, Germaine De Leon and Ricky Davao.

== Cast ==
- Gold Azeron as Adam
- Iana Bernardez as Angel
- Yayo Aguila as Elena
- Germaine De Leon as Dr. Abraham
- Ricky Davao as Edgar
- Dylan Ray Talon as Supot
- Bodjie Pascua as Dr. Mortis
- Lui Manansala as Principal
- Sarah Pagcaliwagan as Mrs. Dimasalang

== Release ==
The film premiered at the Cinema One Originals Film festival on 8 November 2019.

== Reception ==
Jason Tan Liwag of Little White Lies called the film a "landmark of intersex representation in Philippine cinema."

Brian Bromberger of Bay Area Reporter wrote that while the film "can be a bit preachy", it "courageously integrates a faithful understanding embrace of intersex that applies to all queer people." Bromberger also praised Azeron's performance, writing that he is "able to convey both vulnerability and fearlessness."

Julia Allende of PEP.ph wrote that while the film "feels a little bit rushed", it "deals with an otherwise uncomfortable phenomenon in a light-handed and humorous manner, reflecting the mindset of a teenage boy at a crossroads", and "does not shy away from the rude portrayal of sexual awakening, fully embracing its awkwardness and messiness."

Randy Myers of The Mercury News called it a "powerful film that is just a tad too neat in its resolution."
