= Elijah Canlas =

Filipino actor and model (born 2000)

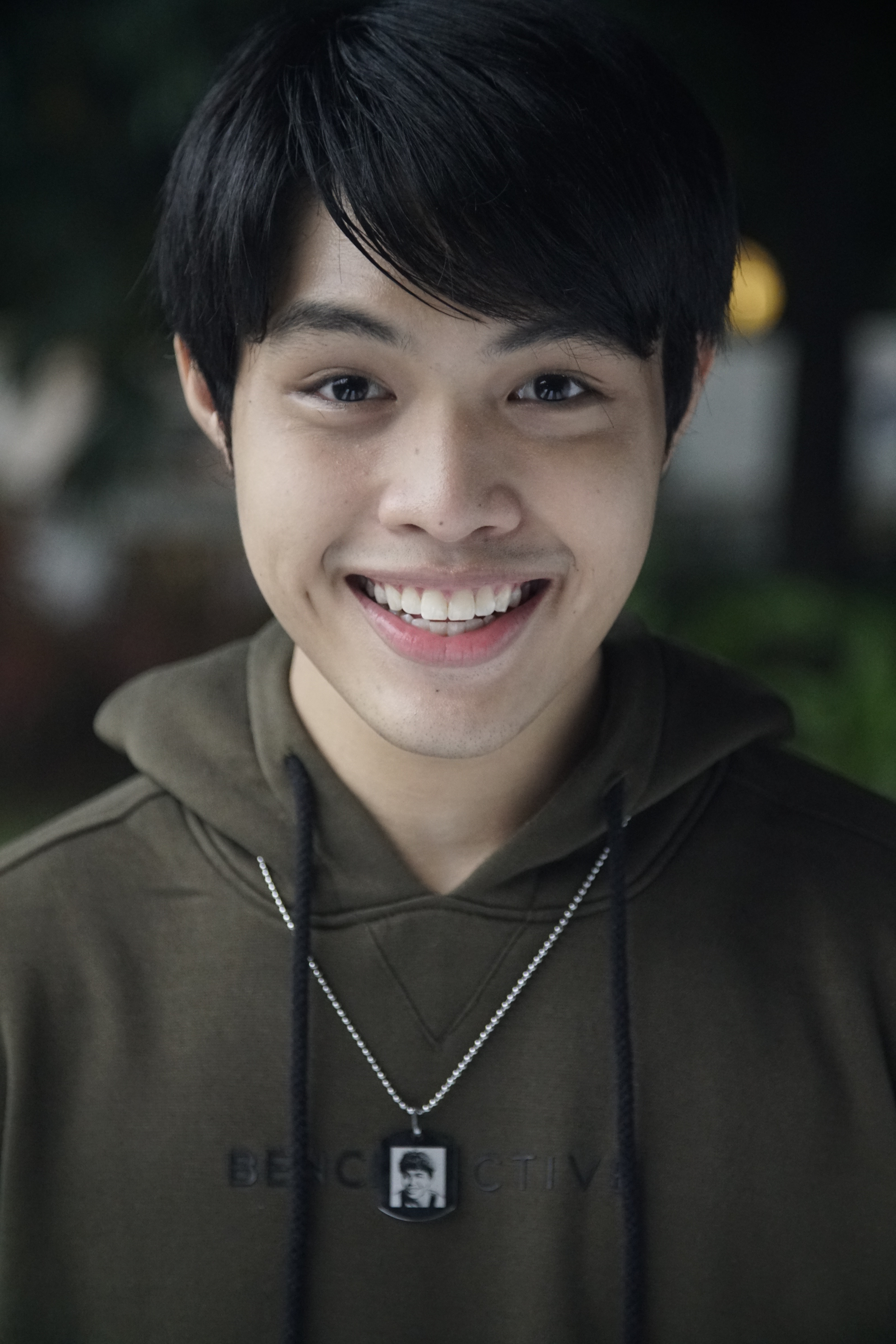
- Canlas in 2020
- Born: Elijah Luiz Madiclum Canlas; August 16, 2000 (age 26); Manila, Philippines
- Education: University of the Philippines Manila; MINT College; Philippine High School for the Arts
- Occupations: Actor; singer
- Years active: 2014–present
- Agent(s): The IdeaFirst Company (2014–present); ABS-CBN Corporation (2019–present); TV5 Network (2020–present); Cornerstone (2025–present)

Elijah Luiz Madiclum Canlas (born August 16, 2000) is a Filipino actor and singer. He began his professional acting career in the 2014 independent film Sundalong Kanin, an official entry to Cinemalaya Philippine Independent Film Festival. He then rose to prominence for his award-winning performance in Kalel, 15 (2019), where he received Best Actor awards at the 43rd Gawad Urian Awards, 68th FAMAS Awards, 17th Asian Film Festival in Rome, Italy, and 16th Harlem International Film Festival in New York, United States.

== Early life and education ==
Elijah Luiz Madiclum Canlas was born on August 16, 2000, in Manila. He is the second son of Rommel and Lyn Canlas. Second of three siblings, he is called "Jelo" by his older brother Jerom Andrei, and younger brother, Jamile Matthew "JM" (2005/06–2023). The Canlas brothers are all actors who played various roles in film, theater, and television. With their mother being a ballerina, and theater actress in Bacolod, they were exposed to arts, and theater at a very young age.

Canlas finished grade school at Statefields School, a private institute located in Bacoor, Cavite. In Junior High School, he studied Theater Arts at the Philippine High School for the Arts and finished Senior High School at MINT College. He is currently taking up his Bachelor of Arts in Philippine Arts at the University of the Philippines Manila while continuously pursuing his acting career.

== Career ==
When he was 14 years old, he debuted as one of the four main characters in the film Sundalong Kanin (2014), a Cinemalaya entry directed by Janice O'Hara.

In 2014, he auditioned for the main role of Kalel, 15 when it was still titled Son of God, but got rejected because the role was supposed to be given to someone who resembles a mestizo son of a Spanish friar. Four years later in 2018, Canlas met with director Jun Robles Lana because he was looking for a talent manager. During the meeting, Lana suddenly said Canlas could play the lead in his next film as Kalel.

A year after portraying his role in the film Edward (2019), his performance won him a Best Supporting Actor award (PinakaPASADOng Katuwang na Aktor) from the Pampelikulang Samahan ng mga Dalubguro (PASADO), alongside other nominees such as Baron Geisler, Joross Gamboa and Ian Veneracion. He also won Best Acting Ensemble together with the other cast members of the film Kalel, 15 (2019) in the 2020 PARAGON Critics Choice Awards.

In May 2020, he was cast as one of the main actors in the YouTube series, Gameboys. Produced by The IdeaFirst Company, it is a boys love series in the Philippines that tackles the story of two young men who find each other online amid the COVID-19 pandemic. Along with Kokoy de Santos as Gavreel Alarcon, Canlas starred in the thirteen-part web series as Cairo Lazaro, an up-and-coming online game streamer.

On August 5, 2020, he won his first Best Actor award at the prestigious 17th Asian Film Festival in Rome, Italy for Kalel, 15. On December 22 of the same year, he was named by CNN Philippines as "Actor of the Year".

== Personal life ==
In 2021, Canlas dated Miles Ocampo and announced their relationship to the public in 2022. They broke up in 2026.

His younger brother, former child actor JM Canlas, died on August 3, 2023, at the age of 17. A cause of death was not revealed. His older brother Jerom said that JM had "been struggling with his mental health" prior to his death.

== Filmography ==
Key
†	Denotes films that have not yet been released

=== Film ===
Year	Title	Role	Notes	Ref.
2014	Sundalong Kanin	Badong	10th Cinemalaya Independent Film Festival entry	
2016	Sakaling Hindi Makarating	Benjie	CineFilipino Film Festival entry	
2016	Gasping for Air "1-2-3"	Rey	Northern Virginia International Film and Music Festival entry	
2019	Kalel, 15	Kalel	Tallinn Black Nights Film Festival entry	
2019	Edward	Renz	15th Cinemalaya Independent Film Festival entry	
2019	LSS (Last Song Syndrome)	Cedie	3rd Pista ng Pelikulang Pilipino entry	
2019	Babae at Baril	Jun	QC International Film Festival entry	
2020	He Who Is Without Sin	Martin Pangan	Pista ng Pelikulang Pilipino entry	
2021	Gameboys: The Movie	Cairo Lazaro		
2022	Blue Room	Troy Rodriguez	18th Cinemalaya Independent Film Festival entry	
2022	Livescream	Exo		
2022	About Us But Not About Us	Lancelot	26th Tallinn Black Nights Film Festival and 2023 Metro Manila Summer Film Festival entry	
2023	Keys to the Heart	Joselito "Jayjay" Hermano		
2023	GomBurZa	Paciano Mercado	49th Metro Manila Film Festival	
2024	Sunshine	Miggy	49th Toronto International Film Festival entry	
2024	Uninvited	Christopher 'Tofy' Almario	50th Metro Manila Film Festival entry	
2025	Salvageland	PO1 Jules Morales		
2026	Drags to Riches	Troye		
2026	Edjop †	Edgar Jopson		
2026	HB2ME †	TBA		

=== Television series ===
Year	Title	Role	Ref.
2019	Past, Present, Perfect?	Marius	
2020	Paano ang Pasko?	Noel Aguinaldo	
2020	Almost Paradise	Luke	
2020	Unconditional	Arthur	
2020–2021	Paano ang Pangako?	Noel Aguinaldo	
2021	My Fantastic Pag-ibig	Dwayne	
2022	Misis Piggy	Jeffrey	
2022	Suntok sa Buwan	Jaime "Dos" Laurente II	
2023	The Iron Heart	Conrado Reyes	
2023–2024	Senior High	Archie Aguerro	
2024	FPJ's Batang Quiapo	Pablo Caballero	
2024	High Street	Archie Aguerro	
2024–present	ASAP	Himself / Co-host / Performer	
2025	Incognito	Donato Escalera / Spade	
2025	Maalaala Mo Kaya Season 31: Apoy	Sofronio Vasquez	
2025	Vibe	Vibe Jock Elijah	

=== Web series ===
Year	Title	Role	Ref.
2020	Pearl Next Door	Cairo Lazaro	
2020	Gameboys	Cairo Lazaro	
2022	Gameboys 2	Cairo Lazaro	

=== Music videos ===
Year	Title	Artist	Ref
2025	"Multo"	Cup of Joe	
2025	"Ano Ba Talaga Tayo?"	The Juans	
2026	"Kontrabida"	Kakie	

=== Theater ===
Year	Production	Role	Location	Ref.
2024	Emulsyon (Note: A twin bill featuring the plays Loyalist Redux and Indigo Child.)	Anak/Jerome	Erehwon Center for the Arts, Quezon City	
2025	Dagitab	Gab Atienza	Fine Arts Black Box Theater, Pasay	
2025	Dagitab	Gab Atienza	Power Mac Center Spotlight Blackbox Theater, Makati	
2026	About Us But Not About Us	Lancelot	Power Mac Center Spotlight Blackbox Theater, Makati	

== Awards and nominations ==
Year	Award ceremony	Category	Nominated work	Result	Ref.
2020	17th Asian Film Festival	Best Actor	Kalel, 15	Won	
2020	68th FAMAS Awards	Best Actor	Kalel, 15	Won	
2020	22nd Gawad Pasado Awards	Best Supporting Actor	Edward	Won	
2020	43rd Gawad Urian Awards	Best Actor	Kalel, 15	Won	
2020	PARAGON Critics Choice Awards	Best Acting Ensemble	Kalel, 15	Won	
2020	Pista ng Pelikulang Pilipino	Special Jury Prize for Performance in a Lead Role	He Who Is Without Sin	Won	
2020	Pista ng Pelikulang Pilipino	Best Actor	He Who Is Without Sin	Nominated	
2020	38th Luna Awards	Best Supporting Actor	Edward	Nominated	
2021	7th Urduja Heritage Film Awards	Best Young Actor	Kalel, 15	Won	
2021	5th Film Ambassadors' Night	11 New Film Ambassadors for Acting Performance	Kalel, 15	Won	
2021	16th Harlem International Film Festival	Best Actor	Kalel, 15	Won	
2021	4th EDDYS Awards	Best Actor	He Who Is Without Sin	Nominated	
2021	Young Critics Circle	Best Performance	He Who Is Without Sin	Nominated	
2021	Young Critics Circle	Best Performance (Duo) alongside Enzo Pineda	He Who Is Without Sin	Nominated	
2021	Ani ng Dangal Awards (National Commission for Culture and the Arts)	Recipient for Ani ng Dangal Awards	Himself	Won	
2021	36th PMPC Star Awards for Movies	Best Actor	Kalel, 15	Nominated	
2021	36th PMPC Star Awards for Movies	Best Supporting Actor	Babae at Baril	Nominated	
2023	1st Summer Metro Manila Film Festival Awards (MMFF)	Jury Prize	About Us But Not About Us	Won	
2023	1st Summer Metro Manila Film Festival Awards (MMFF)	Best Actor	About Us But Not About Us	Nominated	
2023	6th EDDYS Awards	Best Actor	Blue Room	Won	
2024	Platinum Stallion National Media Award 2024	Best Primetime Drama Actor	Senior High	Won	
2024	7th EDDYS Awards	Best Actor	Keys to the Heart	Nominated	
