= Shadow Behind the Moon =

2015 political thriller drama film by Jun Robles Lana

- Anino sa Likod ng Buwan
- Directed by: Jun Robles Lana
- Written by: Jun Robles Lana
- Produced by: Jun Robles Lana; Ferdinand Lapuz; Tonee Acejo; Antonio P. Tuviera; Carlo C. Mendoza; Mark Mendoza; Lawrence S. Ang
- Starring: Luis Alandy; Anthony Falcon; LJ Reyes
- Cinematography: Carlo C. Mendoza
- Edited by: Lawrence S. Ang
- Music by: Richard Gonzales
- Production companies: The IdeaFirst Company; October Train Films; APT Entertainment
- Distributed by: The IdeaFirst Company
- Release dates: 9 July 2015 (KVIFF); 23 October 2015 (QCinema)
- Running time: 118 minutes
- Country: Philippines
- Language: Filipino

Shadow Behind the Moon (Filipino: Anino sa Likod ng Buwan) is a 2015 Philippine political thriller drama film written, co-produced, and directed by Jun Robles Lana, based on an award-winning one-act play he wrote in 1993. Shot in one take, the story, which stars Anthony Falcon, Luis Alandy, and LJ Reyes, follows three people who become trapped in the crossfire between the Philippine Army and the far-left rebels as they attempt to resolve a difficult situation.

Produced by The IdeaFirst Company, October Train Films, and APT Entertainment, in association with Quiapost Productions and Buchi Boy Productions, the film premiered in the Czech Republic on 9 July 2015, as one of the competing entries under the Forum of Independents category at the 50th Karlovy Vary International Film Festival. It was released in the Philippines on 23 October at the QCinema International Film Festival and had a limited commercial release in 2016.

== Plot ==
The communist government was thought to have its headquarters in the Marag Valley province. As a result, thousands of locals were displaced and forced to abandon their homes. The Philippine military declared the area a "no man's land" when some of them sought refuge in the woods, even though many of them perished from famine, illness, brutality, and human rights violations.

== Cast ==
- Luis Alandy as Joel
- Anthony Falcon as Nardo
- LJ Reyes as Emma

== Production ==
The film was based on the one-act play that filmmaker Jun Robles Lana wrote during his college years at the University of Santo Tomas. It went on to win a grand prize at the competition led by Bulwagang Gantimpala, who co-adapted the entry to the stage.

== Reception ==
=== Critical response ===
Film critic Tito Genova Valiente gave a positive review, calling the film a "powerful and intelligent" piece that combines theater-like intimacy with psychological strain. Along with the screenplay's skill at fusing suspense with political commentary and sensuality, the cast's acting performances were commended for portraying their characters with strong emotions.

Clarence Tsui, writing for The Hollywood Reporter, gave a positive review, pointing out its claustrophobic setting, one-shot photography, and slow disclosure concerning human motivations. He noted that the work effectively explored themes of military, sexuality, and power in the Philippine countryside while transforming its constrained setting into a tense and psychologically complex drama.

Fred Hawson, writing for ABS-CBN News and Current Affairs, gave the film 9 out of 10 and described it as one of the top Filipino movies of 2015. He commended Jun Robles Lana for the film's theatrical dialogue, dismal tone, and uninterrupted visuals, which he claimed successfully reaffirmed its themes of deceit and war, resulting in being called his "artistic peak". The cast's performances, especially LJ Reyes's role as Emma, received commendation as well.

=== Accolades ===
Award-giving organization	Date	Category	Recipient(s)	Result	Ref.
50th Karlovy Vary International Film Festival	11 July 2015	Independent Camera	Shadow Behind the Moon	Nominated	
13th Pacific Meridian International Film Festival of Asia Pacific Countries	18 September 2015	FIPRESCI Award - Best Feature Film	Shadow Behind the Moon	Won	
13th Pacific Meridian International Film Festival of Asia Pacific Countries	18 September 2015	NETPAC Award	Shadow Behind the Moon	Won	
13th Pacific Meridian International Film Festival of Asia Pacific Countries	18 September 2015	Best Director	Jun Robles Lana	Won	
13th Pacific Meridian International Film Festival of Asia Pacific Countries	18 September 2015	Best Actress	LJ Reyes	Won	
9th Five Flavours Film Festival	20 November 2015	Best Film	Shadow Behind the Moon	Nominated	
20th International Film Festival of Kerala	11 December 2015	Best Director	Jun Robles Lana	Won	
39th Gawad Urian Awards	22 June 2016	Best Film	Shadow Behind the Moon	Nominated	
39th Gawad Urian Awards	22 June 2016	Best Director	Jun Robles Lana	Nominated	
39th Gawad Urian Awards	22 June 2016	Best Actor	Luis Alandy	Nominated	
39th Gawad Urian Awards	22 June 2016	Best Actor	Anthony Falcon	Nominated	
39th Gawad Urian Awards	22 June 2016	Best Actress	LJ Reyes	Won	
39th Gawad Urian Awards	22 June 2016	Best Screenplay	Shadow Behind the Moon; Written by Jun Robles Lana	Nominated	
39th Gawad Urian Awards	22 June 2016	Best Cinematography	Carlo Mendoza	Nominated	
39th Gawad Urian Awards	22 June 2016	Best Editing	Lawrence S. Ang	Nominated	
39th Gawad Urian Awards	22 June 2016	Best Sound	Albert Michael Idioma	Nominated	
