= Bakit Lahat ng Gwapo may Boyfriend? =

2016 comedy-drama film by Jun Robles Lana

- Movie title card
- Directed by: Jun Robles Lana
- Screenplay by: Denoy Navarro-Punio; Renei Dimla
- Story by: Jun Robles Lana
- Produced by: Vic R. del Rosario Jr.
- Starring: Anne Curtis; Dennis Trillo; Paolo Ballesteros
- Cinematography: Mackie Galvez
- Edited by: Thatchenko Salcedo; Noah Tonga
- Music by: Richard Gonzales
- Production companies: Viva Films; The IdeaFirst Company
- Distributed by: Viva Films
- Release date: October 19, 2016
- Country: Philippines
- Language: Filipino
- Box office: ₱24 million

Bakit Lahat ng Gwapo may Boyfriend? ("Why does every handsome guy have a boyfriend?") is a 2016 Philippine comedy-drama film directed by Jun Robles Lana and written by Denoy Navarro-Punio and Renei Dimla from Lana's story concept. The film stars Anne Curtis, Dennis Trillo, Paolo Ballesteros.

A co-production of Viva Films and The IdeaFirst Company, it was released theatrically on October 19, 2016.

== Plot ==
Kylie, a wedding planner, has had a string of boyfriends; unfortunately for her, all of them have turned out to be gay, including Benj, her first boyfriend. On the up-side, some of them have become her good friends. In fact, Benj became one of her best friends, on top of being a business partner in a mutual wedding-planning venture. Because of her "luck" (or "curse") with attracting specific men, she comes to believe that she will never find true love. Everyone she is attracted to will, seemingly, just come out as gay. This theory gets put to the test when she meets Diego, Benj's childhood best friend (and secret love), with whom she becomes quite smitten. Further egged-on by Benj, Kylie sets out to prove yet again that she's correct, only this time it is about Diego--who is engaged to be married to a beautiful, classy lady. Is he indeed another closet case?

== Cast and characters ==
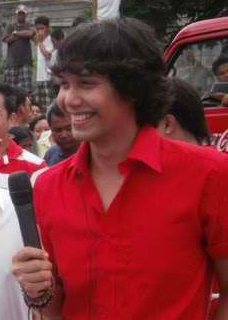
Paolo Ballesteros portrays Benj

- Anne Curtis as Kylie
- Dennis Trillo as Diego
- Paolo Ballesteros as Benj

=== Supporting cast ===
- Will Devaughn as Henry
- Yam Concepcion as Fiona
- Sinon Loresca as Ramon Ramon
- Prince Stefan as Tom
- Yayo Aguila as Dina
- Donnalyn Bartolome as Cindy
- Michael De Mesa as Nap/Lexi
- Alma Concepcion as Julia
