= The IdeaFirst Company =

Filipino film production company

- Trade name: IdeaFirst
- Type: Private
- Industry: Mass media
- Founded: April 1, 2014; 12 years ago
- Founders: Jun Robles Lana; Perci Intalan
- Headquarters: 94-A Scout Guia St., Diliman, Quezon City, Metro Manila, Philippines
- Area served: Worldwide
- Key people: Jun Lana (President); Perci Intalan (Vice President)
- Products: Motion pictures Television series Web series
- Services: Film and television production studio Talent agency
- Website: theideafirstcompany.com

The IdeaFirst Company (TIFC), commonly known as IdeaFirst, is a Filipino film, television production company and talent agency founded in 2014 by filmmakers Jun Robles Lana and Perci Intalan. The company focuses on film and television production, as well as artist management.

The company is best known for producing Bwakaw (2012), Die Beautiful (2016), Kalel, 15 (2019), Gameboys (2020), and And the Breadwinner Is... (2024).

== Background ==
The IdeaFirst Company was founded on April 1, 2014 by filmmakers Jun Robles Lana and Perci Intalan. Lana formerly served as the Creative Director for GMA Network, while Intalan was an Executive Producer for Walt Disney and the former first Vice President for Entertainment for TV5. The two filmmakers left their prior positions to co-found the company.

The company has engaged in partnerships with mainstream Philippine film studios such as Viva Films, ABS-CBN Studios/Star Cinema and Regal Entertainment, as well as internationally with Netflix. The company is atypical in that it signs directors as well as actors.

Creatives under IdeaFirst include Sigrid Andrea Bernardo, Christian Bables, and Prime Cruz.

== Filmography ==
=== Films ===
Year	Film	Co-Producer
2012	Bwakaw	Cinemalaya; OctoberTrain Films
2013	Mga Kwentong Barbero (Barber's Tales)	OctoberTrain Films; APT Entertainment
2014	Dementia	OctoberTrain Films
2015	Anino sa Likod ng Buwan (Shadow Behind the Moon)	OctoberTrain Films
2015	Sleepless	IndioBoy Productions
2016	I Love You To Death	Regal Entertainment
2016	Die Beautiful	Regal Entertainment; OctoberTrain Films
2016	Bakit Lahat ng Gwapo may Boyfriend?	Viva Films
2016	Ang Manananggal sa Unit 23B	
2016	I, America	Viva Films
2017	The Write Moment	Viva Films
2017	The Debutantes	Regal Entertainment
2017	The Ashes and Ghosts of Tayug 1931 (‘Dapol tan payawar na Tayug 1931’)	HYD Entertainment; Sine Caboloan
2018	Ang Dalawang Mrs. Reyes	Star Cinema; Quantum Films
2018	My Fairy Tail Love Story	Regal Films
2018	Ang Pambansang Third Wheel	Viva Films
2018	Mr. and Mrs. Cruz	Viva Films
2018	Gusto Kita with All My Hypothalamus	CineFilipino; Epic Media
2018	Ang Babaeng Allergic Sa Wifi	OctoberTrain Films; Cignal Entertainment
2018	Distance	Cinemalaya
2019	Born Beautiful	Cignal Entertainment; OctoberTrain Films
2019	The Panti Sisters	Black Sheep Productions; Quantum Films; AVL Films; ABS-CBN Films
2019	UnTrue	Viva Films
2019	Unforgettable	Viva Films
2019	Kalel, 15	Cignal Entertainment; OctoberTrain Films
2021	Gameboys: The Movie	OctoberTrain Films
2021	Big Night!	Cignal Entertainment; OctoberTrain Films; Quantum Films
2022	Mahal Kita, Beksman	Viva Films; Powerhouse MC
2023	Ten Little Mistresses	Amazon Prime Video
2023	As If It's True	Cinemalaya
2023	Becky & Badette	OctoberTrain Films
2024	Your Mother's Son	
2024	And the Breadwinner Is...	ABS-CBN Studios; Star Cinema
2025	Flower Girl	OctoberTrain Films; CreaZion Studios
2025	Call Me Mother	ABS-CBN Studios; Star Cinema; Viva Films
2026	Sisa	October Train Films; Quantum Films; Cineko Productions CMB Films Forever Group
2026	Ang Magtutuli †	
2026	Petrang Kabayo: Ang Lihim ng Bughaw na Anting-anting †	ABS-CBN Studios; Star Cinema; Viva Films
2026	Untitled film of Vice Ganda, Ion Perez and Vhong Navarro †	ABS-CBN Studios; Star Cinema; Viva Films

=== Television programs ===
Title	Airing date	Season/s	Network
LolaBasyang.com	July 11, 2015 - January 30, 2016	2 Seasons, 27 Episodes	TV5
#ParangNormalActivity	July 11, 2015 – May 7, 2016	4 Seasons, 43 Episodes	TV5
Sleepless: The Series	2018 (Cignal Play); 2021 (TV Premiere)	1 Season, 12 Episodes	TV5; Cignal Play
From Helen's Kitchen		3 Seasons	TV5; Colours; Cignal Play
Paano ang Pasko?	November 23, 2020 – December 31, 2020	1 Season, 30 Episodes	TV5
Paano ang Pangako?	January 4, 2021 - April 3, 2021	1 season	TV5
Barangay Singko Panalo	March 11, 2024 - June 28, 2024	1 season	TV5

=== Web series ===
Title	Release date	Episodes	Director/s	Platform
Feels Like Forever	2017	1 Season, 11 Episodes	Sigrid Andrea P. Bernardo & Ivan Andrew Payawal	Cignal Play
The Orbiters	2017 (2019 on Cignal Play)	1 Season, 12 Episodes	Miko Livelo	Cignal Play
Born Beautiful: The Series	June 10, 2019	1 Season, 12 Episodes	Perci Intalan	Cignal Play
I Am U	February 26, 2020 – March 18, 2020	1 Season 7 Episodes	Dwein Ruedas Baltazar	iWant
Unconditional	July 16, 2020	10 Episodes	Ivan Andrew Payawal, Dwein Baltazar	Cignal Play
Gameboys	May 22, 2020 – September 13, 2020	Season 1: 14 Episodes; Season 2: In Production	Ivan Andrew Payawal	YouTube; Netflix
Pearl Next Door	October 23, 2020 – January 9, 2020	Season 1: 8 episodes	Ivan Andrew Payawal, Nestor Abrogena	YouTube
Love vs. Stars	May 5, 2021 - July 28, 2021	1 Season 13 episodes	Ivan Andrew Payawal, Prime Cruz (associate director)	Cignal Play
