= Isa Pa, with Feelings =

2019 romantic comedy film by Prime Cruz

Isa Pa with Feelings
- Theatrical release poster
- Directed by: Prime Cruz
- Written by: Jen Chuaunsu; Katherine S. Labayen
- Produced by: Kriz G. Gazmen; Camille G. Montaño; Marjorie B. Lachica
- Starring: Maine Mendoza; Carlo Aquino
- Cinematography: Tey Clamor
- Edited by: Benjamin Tolentino
- Music by: Andrew Florentino
- Production companies: ABS-CBN Film Productions; Black Sheep Productions; APT Entertainment
- Distributed by: ABS-CBN Film Productions
- Release date: October 16, 2019
- Running time: 100 minutes
- Country: Philippines
- Languages: Filipino; Filipino Sign Language
- Box office: ₱43 million

Isa Pa with Feelings (lit. '"One More with Feelings"') is a 2019 Filipino romantic comedy film directed by Prime Cruz from a story and screenplay written by Jen Chuaunsu and Katherine S. Labayen. Starring Maine Mendoza and Carlo Aquino, with the supporting casts including Lotlot de Leon, Cris Villanueva, and Nikki Valdez, the story follows an aspiring architecture student who falls in love with her deaf neighbor and learns communicating with him in Sign Language.

Produced by ABS-CBN Film Productions and Black Sheep Productions, in association with APT Entertainment, the film was theatrically released on October 16, 2019. As of April 20, 2021, it is available on Netflix.

== Plot ==
An architecture student, Mara, takes a break from studying by dancing on her balcony, where her next-door neighbor happens to see her. She turns around mid-dance to find him smiling, and she retreats inside, feeling embarrassed. After her exams, she visits her family in the countryside, where a billboard of her face congratulating her on passing the exam is in front of the house for all to see. She enters the house to argue about it, but when her dad justifies it as a sure thing because she is making his dreams come true, she leaves him be. As more families show up, she turns her attention to Hailey, her deaf niece. She tells both her and her mom that she has signed up for a sign language class to communicate with Hailey, much to the family's delight.

When Mara enters the architecture firm where she's been interning, her co-interns ignore her greetings and turn away. She finds out that she failed her board exams. She shows up to sign language class, and her teacher turns out to be her next-door neighbor, Gali. They formally introduce themselves and proceed to learn basic sign language phrases. When she flatly signs the phrase "I'm sorry", Gali presses her to do the sign again "with feelings," because facial expressions are key to communicating in sign language.

They become friends and slowly fall in love. Eventually, they realize how their deaf and hearing worlds could drive each other apart.

== Cast ==
Main cast

- Maine Mendoza as Mara Navarro
- Carlo Aquino as Gali Pastrano

Supporting cast

- Cris Villanueva as Bert Navarro
- Lotlot de Leon as Angie Navarro
- Nikki Valdez as Stella Navarro
- Kat Galang as Ira
- Vangie Labalan as Lita
- Geleen Eugenio as Teacher Laura
- Arci Muñoz as Annica
- Rafa Siguion-Reyna as Vincent
- Artemis Phoebe Vizmanos as Hailey

== Reception ==
=== Accolades ===
Award-giving organization	Date of ceremony	Category	Recipient(s)	Result	Ref.
18th Gawad Tanglaw Awards	December 20, 2020	Jury Award for Film Acting	Carlo Aquino	Won (Note: Shared the award with Kathryn Bernardo and Alden Richards.)	
36th PMPC Star Awards for Movies	September 26, 2021	Movie Actor of the Year	Carlo Aquino	Nominated	
36th PMPC Star Awards for Movies	September 26, 2021	Movie Loveteam of the Year	Carlo Aquino and Maine Mendoza	Nominated	
