= 43rd Gawad Urian Awards =

2020 Philippine film awards ceremony

- Date: November 10, 2020

Highlights
- Best Picture: Babae at Baril
- Most awards: Babae at Baril (6)
- Most nominations: Babae at Baril (9)

The 43rd Gawad Urian Awards (Tagalog: Ika-4 na Gawad Urian) was held on November 10, 2020. The best Philippine films for the year 2019 were honored in the event. Nominations were announced on August 27.

Babae at Baril received the most nominations with nine. It won six awards, including Best Picture.

The Natatanging Gawad Urian was awarded to Fiel Corrales Zabat.

== Winners and nominees ==
Best Picture Pinakamahusay na Pelikula	Best Director Pinakamahusay na Direksyon
Babae At Baril: Cleaners; Edward; Ang Hupa; Huwebes, Huwebes; John Denver Trending; Kalel, 15; Metamorphosis	Rae Red, Babae at Baril: Glenn Barit, Cleaners; Arden Rod Condez, John Denver Trending; Lav Diaz, Ang Hupa; Jun Lana, Kalel, 15; Arnel Mordoquio, Alma-Ata; Thop Nazareno, Edward; JE Tiglao, Metamorphosis
Best Actor Pinakamahusay na Pangunahing Aktor	Best Actress Pinakamahusay na Pangunahing Aktres
Elijah Canlas, Kalel, 15; Louis Abuel, Edward; Oliver Aquino, Jino To Mari; Gold Azeron, Metamorphosis; Raymond Bagatsing, Quezon's Game; Royce Cabrera, Fuccbois; Gio Gahol, Sila-Sila; Joel Lamangan, Ang Hupa; Jansen Magpusao, John Denver Trending; Alden Richards, Hello, Love, Goodbye	Janine Gutierrez, Babae at Baril; Kathryn Bernardo, Hello, Love, Goodbye; Alessandra de Rossi, Lucid; Max Eigenmann, Verdict; Angie Ferro, Lola Igna; Jean Garcia, Watch Me Kill; Nadine Lustre, Ulan; Anita Linda, Circa; Bela Padilla, Mañanita; Sue Prado, Alma-Ata; Ruby Ruiz, Iska
Best Supporting Actor Pinakamahusay na Pangalawang Aktor	Best Supporting Actress Pinakamahusay na Pangalawang Aktres
Kristoffer King, Verdict; Ricky Davao, Fuccbois; Dido Dela Paz, Edward; Topper Fabregas, Sila-Sila; Yves Flores, Lola Igna; Noel John Noval, Huwebes, Huwebes; JC Santos, Babae at Baril	Yayo Aguila, Metamorphosis; Pinky Amador, Ang Hupa; Perla Bautista, Ulan; Angie Castrence, Iska; Cherie Gil, Kaputol; Maricel Laxa, Hello, Love, Goodbye; Meryll Soriano, John Denver Trending
Best Screenplay Pinakamahusay na Dulang Pampelikula	Best Cinematography Pinakamahusay na Sinematograpiya
Jun Lana, Kalel, 15; Glenn Barit, Cleaners; John Bedia, Edward; Arden Rod Condez, John Denver Trending; Lav Diaz, Ang Hupa; Don Gerardo Frasco, Huwebes, Huwebes; Rae Red, Babae at Baril	Tey Clamor, Babae at Baril; Tey Clamor, Lola Igna; Tey Clamor, Metamorphosis; Mycko David, Jino To Mari; Neil Daza, Ulan; Lav Diaz and Daniel Uy, Ang Hupa; Steven Evangelio, Cleaners; Odyssey Flores, Mañanita; Don Gerardo Frasco, Huwebes, Huwebes; Cyprus Lilim, Alma-Ata; Carlo Canlas Mendoza, Kalel,15; Joshua Reyles, Verdict; Rommel Sales, John Denver Trending; Marcin Szocinski, Watch me Kill
Best Production Design Pinakamahusay na Disenyong Pamproduksyon	Best Editing Pinakamahusay na Editing
Eero Yves Francisco, Babae at Baril; Ferdie Abuel, Ulan; Maolen Fadul, Kalel, 15; Alvin Francisco, Edward; Alvin Francisco, Cleaners; Matthew Rosen, Quezon's Game; Connie Valera, Watch me Kill	Ilsa Malsi, Babae at Baril; JR Cabrera and Thop Nazareno, Edward; Diego Marx Dobles and Jay Altarejos, Jino To Mari; Brian Gonzales and Jet Leyco, For my Alien Friend; Noah Loyola and Che Tagaymon, Cleaners; Ilsa Malsi, Sila-Sila; Carlo Francisco Manatad, Fuccbois; Benjamin Gonzales Tolentino, Kalel, 15; Renard Torres, Ulan
Best Music Pinakamahusay na Musika	Best Sound Pinakamahusay na Tunog
Jude Gitamondoc and Cindy Velasquez, Huwebes, Huwebes; Teresa Barrozo, Kalel, 15; Glenn Barit, Cleaners; Len Calvo and Adriane Macalipay, Ulan; Divino Dayacap, Metamorphosis; Fatima Nerikka Salim and Immanuel Verona, Babae at Baril	John Michael Perez and Mikko Quizon, Mañanita; Vince Jan Banta, Mikko Quizon and RJ Cantos, Ulan; Bryan Dumaguina, Watch Me Kill; Albert Michael Idioma, Alan Louie Caro and Lamberto Casas, Kalel, 15; Jet Leyco and Brian Gonzales, For my Alien Friend; Daryl Libongco, Aerial Ellyson Mallari, RJ Cantos and Mikko Quizon, Sila-Sila; John Michael Perez and Daryl Libongco, Cleaners; Roy Santos, Edward
Best Short Film Pinakamahusay na Maikling Pelikula	Best Documentary Pinakamahusay na Dokyumentaryo
Tokwifi, Carla Pulido Ocampo	No Data Plan, Miko Revereza

== Special Award ==
=== Natatanging Gawad Urian ===
- Fiel Corrales Zabat

== Multiple nominations and awards ==
Films that received multiple nominations
Nominations	Films
9	Kalel, 15
9	Babae at Baril
8	Cleaners
8	Edward
7	Ulan
6	Ang Hupa
6	John Denver Trending
6	Metamorphosis
5	Huwebes, Huwebes
4	Sila-Sila
4	Mañanita
4	Watch Me Kill
4	Verdict
3	Lola Igna
3	Alma-Ata
3	Fuccbois
2	Hello, Love, Goodbye
2	For My Alien Friend
2	Iska

Films that won multiple awards
Awards	Film
6	Babae at Baril
2	Kalel, 15
