= Saint Jerome Emiliani Institute =

Roman Catholic school in Cavite, Philippines

St. Jerome Emiliani Institute

Location
- Bahayang Pag-asa Molino Bacoor; Cavite; Philippines
- Coordinates: 14°23′53″N 120°58′21″E

Information
- Type: Private School Roman Catholic
- Motto: Ora, incognosco, gaudium (Latin) (Pray, Study and Joy)
- Established: 17 June 1985
- Principal: Sr. Marisa Lofranco, MHJE
- Grades: Nursery, Kindergarten, Preparatory (Pre-School); Grades 1-6 (Grade school); Grades 7-10 (Junior High School); Grade 11-12 Senior High School Program (STEM, ABM, HUMSS)
- Colors: Light blue and light pink
- Athletics: Athletics, badminton, basketball, volleyball

St. Jerome Emiliani Institute (abbreviated as SJEI) is a private, co-educational Catholic Institution conducted by the Somascan Missionary Sisters. It is located on the back of Sto. Niño de Molino Parish Church, Bahayang Pag-asa, Molino, Bacoor, Cavite, Philippines. Like its namesake schools, the students of SJEI are called Jeromians.
