= Jun Lana =

Filipino film director (born 1972)

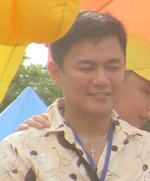
- Lana in 2023 Metro Manila Film Festival
- Born: Rodolfo Robles Lana Jr. October 10, 1972 (age 54); Makati, Rizal, Philippines
- Education: University of Santo Tomas
- Occupations: Film producer; director; screenwriter
- Employers: GMA Network (2006–2014); The IdeaFirst Company (2014–present)
- Spouse: Perci Intalan (m. 2013; sep. 2021)
- Awards: Tallinn Black Nights Film Festival; 2019 Best Director; 2022 Best Film

Rodolfo "Jun" Robles Lana Jr. (born October 10, 1972) is a Filipino filmmaker. The winner of 11 Palanca Awards for Literature, he became the youngest member of the Palanca Hall of Fame in 2006. In 2015, he directed the actual one-shot film, Shadow Behind The Moon, which won the Best Director, NETPAC and FIPRESCI awards at the 13th Pacific Meridian Film Festival. At the 20th International Film Festival of Kerala, he won the Best Director award for the same film.

== Writing career ==
He was born Rodolfo Lana Jr. in Makati, and attended local schools.

Interested in writing from an early age, he began to write and submit plays in Filipino language to competitions. He has adopted Jun Lana as his pen name. At age 19, he received an "Honorable Mention" citation in the 1991 Palanca Awards in the category Dulang May Isang Yugto (One-Act Play in Filipino), for his play Eksodo. The following year, Lana won Third Prize in the same category for Churchill.

In the next eight years, Lana won nine more Palanca Awards for his Filipino-language screenplays and teleplays, including First Prizes for the screenplays Karinyo-Brutal (1995) and Mga Bangka sa Tag-araw (1996); and for the teleplays Sa Daigdig ng mga Taksil (1995), and together with Peter Ong Lim, for Pula (1997).

In 2006, Lana's teleplay Milagrosa won his fifth First Prize Palanca Award and his 11th overall. With his fifth First Prize, Lana was inducted into the Palanca Hall of Fame.

== Film and television work ==
Since 1998, Lana has written screenplays for such directors as Marilou Diaz-Abaya Mel Chionglo and Maryo J. de los Reyes. His screenplay for Diaz-Abaya's Sa Pusod ng Dagat (1998) won Lana the Best Screenplay award from the Brussels European Film Festival|Brussels International Film Festival in 1998.

He has won two FAMAS Best Screenplay awards — in 1998 for Jose Rizal (shared with Ricky Lee and Peter Ong Lim) and in 1999 for Soltera (shared with Jerry Lopez Sineneng). His screenplay for Jose Rizal also won awards from the Metro Manila Film Festival and the Star Awards for Movies. In 2005, Lana's Palanca-award-winning play Mga Estranghero at ang Gabi (1994) was adapted for film by Rody Vera. Renamed Pusang Gala and directed by Ellen Ongkeko-Marfil, the film was nominated for several FAMAS awards, including a Best Story nomination for Lana.

Lana made his film directorial debut with Gigil (2006), starring Katrina Halili. The following year, he wrote and directed Roxanne. From 2006 until 2014, Lana was employed by GMA Network, where he served as a creative consultant for the drama department, and as head writer of Magpakailanman and other shows. Lana also directs for television, sometimes in collaboration with actor Cesar Montano. For GMA Network, he directed his Palanca Award-winning teleplay Milagroso, which was aired as a television special and became a finalist at the 2006 Asian TV Awards. Lana has also directed television episodes for Love2Love, Wag Kukurap, and Fantastikids.

His 2012 film Bwakaw was selected as the Filipino entry for the Best Foreign Language Oscar at the 85th Academy Awards, but it did not make the final shortlist.

In 2014, Lana and frequent filmmaking partner, Perci Intalan, established The IdeaFirst Company, a creative content creation and consultancy company. The company has produced many films, which have been awarded in numerous screenings in the Philippines and overseas.

In the 29th Tokyo International Film Festival, his 2016 film Die Beautiful won the festival's Audience Choice Award, and also the Best Actor award for Paolo Ballesteros.

In 2019, he won the Best Director Award for his feature film Kalel, 15 at the Tallinn Black Nights Film Festival. The film had its world premiere in the Estonian capital where it was screened in the official selection.

In 2023, his new feature Your Mother’s Son was screened at the Toronto Film Festival.

== Personal life ==
Lana is gay and married producer-director Perci Intalan, a former TV5 executive, in a same-sex wedding ceremony in New York City on October 14, 2013. Lana and Intalan were in an open relationship until their separation in December 2021. They consider themselves as best friends and co-parents to their content creation and artist management company, IdeaFirst. Lana is the vice president of IdeaFirst.

== Credits ==
=== Film ===
Year	Title	Credited as			Notes
Year	Title	Director	Screen writer	Producer	Notes
1998	Sa Pusod ng Dagat	No	Yes	No	
1998	Sagad sa Init	No	Yes	No	
1998	Jose Rizal	No	Yes	No	Metro Manila Film Festival entry
1999	Saranggola	No	Yes	No	
1999	Soltera	No	Yes	No	Story and screenplay
1999	Sa Paraiso ni Efren	No	Yes	No	
1999	Muro Ami	No	Yes	No	
2000	Mapagbigay	No	Yes	No	
2001	Red Diaries	No	Yes	No	
2001	Bagong Buwan	No	Yes	No	
2002	I Think I'm in Love	No	Yes	No	Story and screenplay
2002	Bedtime Stories	No	Yes	No	
2002	Two Timer	No	Yes	No	Story and screenplay
2005	Stray Cats	No	Yes	No	"Mga Estranghero at ang Gabi"
2006	Gigil	Yes	No	No	Film directorial debut
2008	Roxxxanne	Yes	Yes	Yes	
2009	Tarot	Yes	Yes	No	Story and screenplay
2011	My Neighbor's Wife	Yes	Yes	No	
2011	Yesterday, Today, Tomorrow	Yes	No	No	
2012	Bwakaw	Yes	Yes	Executive	Credited as "Jun Robles Lana"
2013	Barber's Tales	Yes	Yes	Executive	Credited as "Jun Robles Lana"
2014	Ilaw ng Kahapon	Yes	No	No	TV release; Lenten specials
2014	Hakbang sa Pangarap	Yes	No	No	TV release; Lenten specials
2014	So It's You	Yes	Yes	No	
2015	Anino sa Likod ng Buwan	Yes	Yes	Yes	
2015	The Prenup	Yes	Yes	No	
2015	Haunted Mansion	Yes	Yes	No	Story and screenplay
2016	Bakit Lahat ng Gwapo may Boyfriend?	Yes	Yes	No	Story and screenplay
2016	Die Beautiful	Yes	Story	Yes	Metro Manila Film Festival entry
2018	Ang Dalawang Mrs. Reyes	Yes	Yes	No	Story and screenplay
2018	My Fairy Tail Love Story	No	Yes	Yes	Story and screenplay; supervising producer
2018	Ang Babaeng Allergic sa Wifi	Yes	Yes	Yes	
2019	The Panti Sisters	Yes	No	Executive	
2019	Unforgettable	Yes	Story	Yes	Creative Producer
2019	Kalel, 15	Yes	Yes	Yes	
2021	Big Night!	Yes	Yes	Executive	Metro Manila Film Festival entry
2022	About Us But Not About Us	Yes	Yes	Yes	Story and producer
2023	Ten Little Mistresses	Yes	Yes	Yes	
2023	Anak Ka ng Ina Mo	Yes	Yes	Yes	Story and screenplay
2023	Becky & Badette	Yes	Yes	Yes	Metro Manila Film Festival entry
2024	And the Breadwinner is…	Yes	Yes	Executive	Metro Manila Film Festival entry
2025	Sisa	Yes	Yes	Yes	Tallinn Black Nights Film Festival entry
2025	Call Me Mother	Yes	Yes	Executive	Metro Manila Film Festival entry
2026	Ang Magtutuli †	Yes	Yes	TBA	Story and screenplay
2026	The Greatest Showdown	Yes	TBA	TBA	Metro Manila Film Festival entry

== Accolades ==
=== Film and television awards ===
Awards and nominations received by Jun Robles Lana
Awards and Nominations
Organization	Year	Nominated Work	Category	Result	Ref.
Abu Dhabi Film Festival	2013	Mga Kuwentong Barbero	Best Narrative Feature	Nominated	
Asia Pacific Screen Awards	2017	Die Beautiful	UNESCO Award	Nominated	
Asian Film Festival Barcelona	2023	About Us But Not About Us	Best Film	Nominated	
Cinemalaya Independent Film Festival	2012	Bwakaw	Directors Showcase NETPAC Award	Won	
Cinemalaya Independent Film Festival	2012	Bwakaw	Directors Showcase Audience Award	Won	
Cinemalaya Independent Film Festival	2012	Bwakaw	Best Film - Directors Showcase	Nominated	
The EDDYS	2017	Die Beautiful	Best Director	Nominated	
The EDDYS	2022	Big Night!	Best Director	Nominated	
The EDDYS	2022	Big Night!	Best Screenplay	Won	
The EDDYS	2024	About Us But Not About Us	Best Director	Won	
The EDDYS	2024	About Us But Not About Us	Best Screenplay	Won	
The EDDYS	2024	Becky and Badette (Note: For the song ""Finggah Lickin".)	Best Original Theme Song (Note: Shared with Eugene Domingo, Teresa Barrozo, Erika Estacio, and Elmer Gatchalian.)	Nominated	
FAMAS Awards	1999	José Rizal	Best Screenplay (Note: Shared with Ricky Lee and Peter Ong Lim.)	Won	
FAMAS Awards	2000	Soltera	Best Screenplay (Note: Shared with Jerry Lopez Sineneng.)	Won	
FAMAS Awards	2002	New Moon	Best Screenplay (Note: Shared with Ricky Lee.)	Won	
FAMAS Awards	2006	Stray Cats	Best Screenplay (Note: Shared with Rody Vera.)	Nominated	
FAMAS Awards	2006	Stray Cats	Best Story	Nominated	
FAMAS Awards	2019	Ang Dalawang Mrs. Reyes	Best Original Screenplay (Note: Shared with Elmer Gatchalian.)	Nominated	
FAMAS Awards	2020	Kalel, 15	Best Screenplay	Nominated	
FAMAS Awards	2020	Kalel, 15	Best Director	Nominated	
FAMAS Awards	2022	Big Night!	Best Screenplay	Won	
FAMAS Awards	2022	Big Night!	Best Director	Nominated	
FAMAS Awards	2025	And the Breadwinner Is...	Best Director	Nominated	
Five Flavours Asian Film Festival	2015	Anino sa Likod ng Buwan	Best Film	Nominated	
Fribourg International Film Festival	2013	Bwakaw	Grand Prix	Nominated	
Gawad PASADO	2013	Bwakaw	Pinakapasadong Dulang Pampelikula (Best Screenplay)	Won	
Gawad Urian Awards	1999	Sa Pusod ng Dagat	Best Screenplay (Pinakamahusay na Dulang Pampelikula)	Nominated	
Gawad Urian Awards	2013	Bwakaw	Best Direction (Pinakamahusay na Direksyon)	Nominated	
Gawad Urian Awards	2013	Bwakaw	Best Screenplay (Pinakamahusay na Dulang Pampelikula)	Nominated	
Gawad Urian Awards	2015	Mga Kuwentong Barbero	Best Screenplay (Pinakamahusay na Dulang Pampelikula)	Nominated	
Gawad Urian Awards	2015	Mga Kuwentong Barbero	Best Direction (Pinakamahusay na Direksyon)	Nominated	
Gawad Urian Awards	2016	Anino sa Likod ng Buwan	Best Screenplay (Pinakamahusay na Dulang Pampelikula)	Nominated	
Gawad Urian Awards	2016	Anino sa Likod ng Buwan	Best Direction (Pinakamahusay na Direksyon)	Nominated	
Gawad Urian Awards	2020	Kalel, 15	Best Screenplay (Pinakamahusay na Dulang Pampelikula)	Won	
Gawad Urian Awards	2020	Kalel, 15	Best Direction (Pinakamahusay na Direksyon)	Nominated	
Gawad Urian Awards	2022	Big Night!	Best Screenplay (Pinakamahusay na Dulang Pampelikula)	Nominated	
Gawad Urian Awards	2022	Big Night!	Best Direction (Pinakamahusay na Direksyon)	Nominated	
Gawad Urian Awards	2024	About Us But Not About Us	Best Screenplay (Pinakamahusay na Dulang Pampelikula)	Won	
Gawad Urian Awards	2024	About Us But Not About Us	Best Direction (Pinakamahusay na Direksyon)	Nominated	
Golden Screen Awards	2006	Stray Cats	Best Adapted Screenplay (Note: Shared with Rody Vera.)	Nominated	
Golden Screen Awards	2013	Bwakaw	Best Story	Won	
Golden Screen Awards	2013	Bwakaw	Best Original Screenplay	Won	
Golden Screen Awards	2013	Bwakaw	Best Director	Won	
Hawaii International Film Festival	2012	Bwakaw	Narrative Feature Halekulani Golden Orchid Award	Nominated	
Hong Kong International Film Festival	2013	Mga Kuwentong Barbero	Signis Award	Nominated	
Hong Kong International Film Festival	2014	Bwakaw	Signis Award	Nominated	
Karlovy Vary International Film Festival	2015	Anino sa Likod ng Buwan	Independent Camera	Nominated	
Kerala International Film Festival	2015	Anino sa Likod ng Buwan	Golden Crow Pheasant (Note: Shared with Ferdinand Lapuz.)	Nominated	
Kerala International Film Festival	2015	Anino sa Likod ng Buwan	Best Director	Won	
L.A. Outfest	2013	Bwakaw	Outstanding International Narrative Feature Grand Jury Award	Nominated	
London Web Fest	2021	Pearl Next Door	Best Web Series (Note: Shared with Ivan Andrew Payawal and Perci M. Intalan.)	Nominated	
Luna Award	2000	Soltera	Best Screenplay (Note: Shared with Jerry Lopez Sineneng.)	Nominated	
Luna Award	2013	Bwakaw	Best Screenplay	Nominated	
Luna Award	2013	Bwakaw	Best Director	Nominated	
Luna Award	2017	Die Beautiful	Best Director	Won	
Luna Award	2024	About Us But Not About Us	Best Screenplay	Won	
Madrid International Film Festival	2014	Mga Kuwentong Barbero	Best Director	Won	
Metro Manila Film Festival	1998	José Rizal	Best Original Story (Note: Shared with Ricky Lee and Peter Lim.)	Won	
Metro Manila Film Festival	1998	José Rizal	Best Screenplay (Note: Shared with Ricky Lee and Peter Lim.)	Won	
Metro Manila Film Festival	1999	Muro Ami	Best Story (Note: Shared with Ricky Lee and Marilou Diaz-Abaya.)	Won	
Metro Manila Film Festival	2016	Die Beautiful	Best Director	Nominated	
Metro Manila Film Festival	2021	Big Night!	Best Director	Won	
Metro Manila Film Festival	2021	Big Night!	Best Screenplay	Won	
Metro Manila Film Festival	2023	Becky and Badette	Best Original Theme Song (Note: Shared with Eugene Domingo, Teresa Barrozo, Elmer Gatchalian, and Erika Estacio.)	Won	
Metro Manila Film Festival	2023	Becky and Badette	Best Director	Nominated	
Metro Manila Film Festival	2023	Becky and Badette	Best Screenplay	Nominated	
Metro Manila Film Festival	2025	Call Me Mother	Best Director	Nominated	
Metro Manila Film Festival	2025	Call Me Mother	Best Screenplay	Nominated	
Osaka Asian Film Festival	2022	Big Night!	Best Film	Nominated	
Pacific Meridian International Film Festival of Asia Pacific Countries	2015	Anino sa Likod ng Buwan	NETPAC Award	Won	
Pacific Meridian International Film Festival of Asia Pacific Countries	2015	Anino sa Likod ng Buwan	Best Feature Film	Won	
Pacific Meridian International Film Festival of Asia Pacific Countries	2015	Anino sa Likod ng Buwan	Best Director	Won	
Pista ng Pelikulang Pilipino	2019	The Panti Sisters	Best Director	Nominated	
Pista ng Pelikulang Pilipino	2019	The Panti Sisters	Best Film	Nominated	
Pista ng Pelikulang Pilipino	2019	The Panti Sisters	Audience Choice Award	Won	
PMPC Star Awards for Movies	1999	José Rizal	Adapted Screenplay of the Year (Note: Shared with Ricky Lee and Peter Ong Lim.)	Won	
PMPC Star Awards for Movies	1999	Sa Pusod ng Dagat	Original Screenplay of the Year	Won	
PMPC Star Awards for Movies	2009	Mag-Ingat Ka Sa... Kulam	Movie Original Screenplay of the Year (Note: Shared with Elmer Gatchalian and Renato Custodio Jr.)	Nominated	
PMPC Star Awards for Movies	2009	Mag-Ingat Ka Sa... Kulam	Movie Director of the Year	Nominated	
PMPC Star Awards for Movies	2012	My Neighbor's Wife	Movie Director of the Year	Nominated	
PMPC Star Awards for Movies	2013	Bwakaw	Indie Movie Screenwriter of the Year	Nominated	
PMPC Star Awards for Movies	2013	Bwakaw	Indie Movie Director of the Year	Nominated	
PMPC Star Awards for Movies	2015	Mga Kuwentong Barbero	Indie Movie Screenwriter of the Year	Nominated	
PMPC Star Awards for Movies	2015	Mga Kuwentong Barbero	Indie Movie Director of the Year	Nominated	
PMPC Star Awards for Movies	2016	Anino sa Likod ng Buwan	Indie Movie Screenwriter of the Year	Won	
PMPC Star Awards for Movies	2016	Anino sa Likod ng Buwan	Indie Movie Director of the Year	Nominated	
PMPC Star Awards for Movies	2017	Die Beautiful	Movie Director of the Year	Won	
PMPC Star Awards for Movies	2019	Ang Dalawang Mrs. Reyes	Movie Screenwriter of the Year (Note: Shared with Elmer Gatchalian.)	Nominated	
PMPC Star Awards for Movies	2019	Ang Dalawang Mrs. Reyes	Movie Director of the Year	Nominated	
PMPC Star Awards for Movies	2021	Unforgettable	Movie Director of the Year (Note: Shared with Perci M. Intalan.)	Nominated	
PMPC Star Awards for Movies	2021	The Panti Sisters	Movie Director of the Year	Nominated	
PMPC Star Awards for Movies	2021	Kalel, 15	Indie Movie Director of the Year	Nominated	
PMPC Star Awards for Movies	2021	The Panti Sisters	Movie Screenwriter of the Year (Note: Shared with Ivan Andrew Payawal.)	Nominated	
PMPC Star Awards for Movies	2021	Kalel, 15	Indie Movie Screenwriter of the Year	Nominated	
PMPC Star Awards for Movies	2023	Big Night!	Movie Screenwriter of the Year	Nominated	
PMPC Star Awards for Movies	2023	Big Night!	Movie Director of the Year	Nominated	
PMPC Star Awards for Movies	2024	About Us But Not About Us	Indie Movie Screenwriter of the Year	Nominated	
PMPC Star Awards for Movies	2025	Your Mother’s Son	Indie Movie Screenwriter of the Year (Note: Shared with Elmer Gatchalian.)	Nominated	
Summer Metro Manila Film Festival	2023	About Us But Not About Us	Best Screenplay	Won	
Summer Metro Manila Film Festival	2023	About Us But Not About Us	Best Director	Won	
Tallinn Black Nights Film Festival	2019	Kalel, 15	Best Director	Won	
Tallinn Black Nights Film Festival	2021	Big Night!	Grand Prix for the Best Film (Note: Shared with Guido R. Zaballero, Sienna Olaso, Vitto P. Lazatin, Isabel A. Santillan, and Ferdinand Lapuz)	Nominated	
Tallinn Black Nights Film Festival	2022	About Us But Not About Us	Best Film	Won	
Tokyo International Film Festival	2012	Bwakaw	Asian Film Award — Special Mention	Won	
Tokyo International Film Festival	2013	Mga Kuwentong Barbero	Tokyo Grand Prix	Nominated	
Tokyo International Film Festival	2016	Die Beautiful	Tokyo Grand Prix	Nominated	
Tokyo International Film Festival	2016	Die Beautiful	Grand Prix	Won	
Udine Far East Film Festival	2014	Mga Kuwentong Barbero	Audience Award	Nominated	
Vesoul Asian Film Festival	2013	Bwakaw	Golden Wheel	Nominated	
Vesoul Asian Film Festival	2013	Bwakaw	High Schools Award	Won	
Vesoul Asian Film Festival	2013	Bwakaw	Emile Guimet Award	Won	
Vesoul Asian Film Festival	2013	Bwakaw	Grand Prize of the International Jury	Won	
Young Critics Circle	2024	About Us But Not About Us	Best Screenplay	Nominated	

=== Honors and state recognition ===
Awards and nominations received by Jun Robles Lana
Organization	Year	Nominee/Work	Category	Result	Ref.
Inquirer Indie Bravo!	2013	Jun Robles Lana	—N/a	Honored	
Inquirer Indie Bravo!	2014	Barber's Tales and Bwakaw	—N/a	Honored	
National Commission for Culture and the Arts	2014	Jun Robles Lana	Ani ng Dangal – Cinema	Honored	
National Commission for Culture and the Arts	2015	Jun Robles Lana	Ani ng Dangal – Cinema	Honored	
National Commission for Culture and the Arts	2016	Jun Robles Lana	Ani ng Dangal – Cinema	Honored	
National Commission for Culture and the Arts	2020	Jun Robles Lana	Ani ng Dangal – Cinema	Honored	
National Commission for Culture and the Arts	2021	Jun Robles Lana	Ani ng Dangal – Cinema	Honored	
