= Janine Gutierrez =

Filipina actress (born 1989)

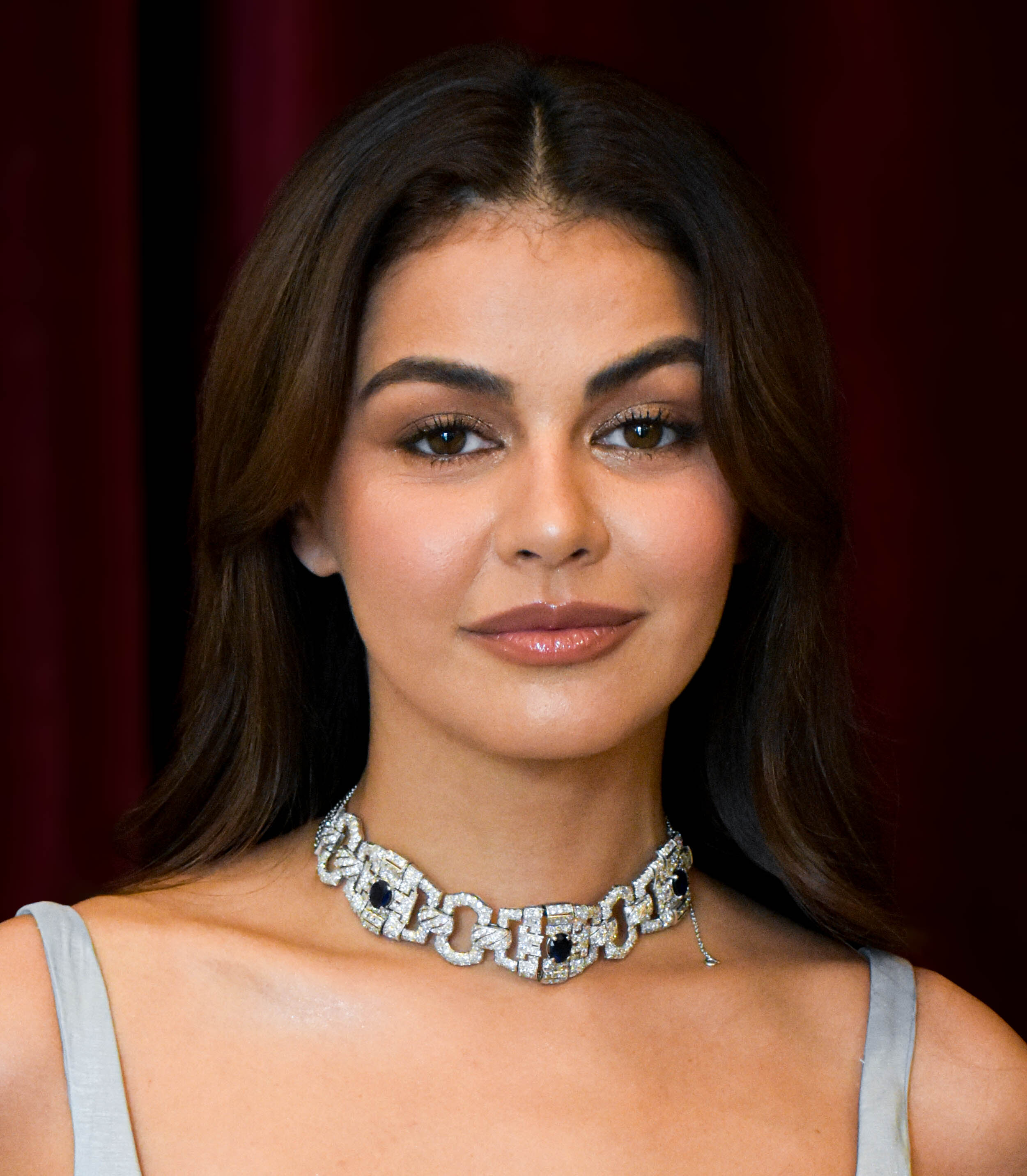
- Gutierrez at the 81st Venice International Film Festival in 2024
- Born: Janine Marie Elizabeth de Leon Gutierrez; October 2, 1989 (age 36); Quezon City, Philippines
- Education: Ateneo de Manila University (AB)
- Occupation: Actress
- Years active: 2010–present
- Agent(s): GMA Network (2011–2021) (Note: Under Sparkle GMA Artist Center.); ABS-CBN Corporation (2021–present) (Note: Became an artist in January 15, 2021 after being with GMA for 10 years upon signing contract with the media company management consisting of chairman Mark Lopez, president and CEO Carlo L. Katigbak, COO Cory Vidanes and CFO Rick Tan, then-Dreamscape Entertainment head Roldeo T. Endrinal and talent manager Leo Dominguez, and later became also under its talent agency Star Magic in April 20, 2026.)
- Mother: Lotlot de Leon
- Family: Gutierrez

YouTube information
- Channel: JanineGutierrezPH
- Years active: 2011–present
- Genres: Travel; lifestyle; fashion; beauty
- Subscribers: 616 thousand
- Views: 56.9 million
- Last updated: August 16, 2026

Janine Marie Elizabeth de Leon Gutierrez (born October 2, 1989) is a Filipino actress. In 2020, she won the Best Actress Award at the 68th FAMAS Awards and 43rd Gawad Urian Awards for her role in the film Babae at Baril (2019). Gutierrez was recognized with the Rising Star Award at the 20th New York Asian Film Festival in 2021. She was previously a talent of GMA Network through Sparkle for a decade from 2011 to 2021 before transferring to ABS-CBN Corporation in 2021.

== Early life and education ==
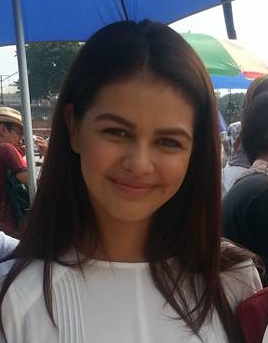
Gutierrez in 2016

Janine Marie Elizabeth de Leon Gutierrez was born on October 2, 1989. As the eldest of four siblings, she comes from a family of actors. Her parents are Ramon Christopher Gutierrez and Lotlot de Leon and her paternal grandparents are Pilita Corrales and Eddie Gutierrez. Donald Olson and Eva Rodriguez are her biological maternal grandparents. Actors Christopher de Leon and Nora Aunor are her adoptive maternal grandparents.

Gutierrez attended preschool along with his classmate Vico Sotto at the Philippine Montessori Center. She attended St. Paul College, Pasig, an all-girls' school, for her elementary and high school. She studied at the Ateneo de Manila University for her tertiary education and graduated with a degree in European Studies in International Business.

== Personal life ==
In August 2024, actor Jericho Rosales announced that he is dating Gutierrez.

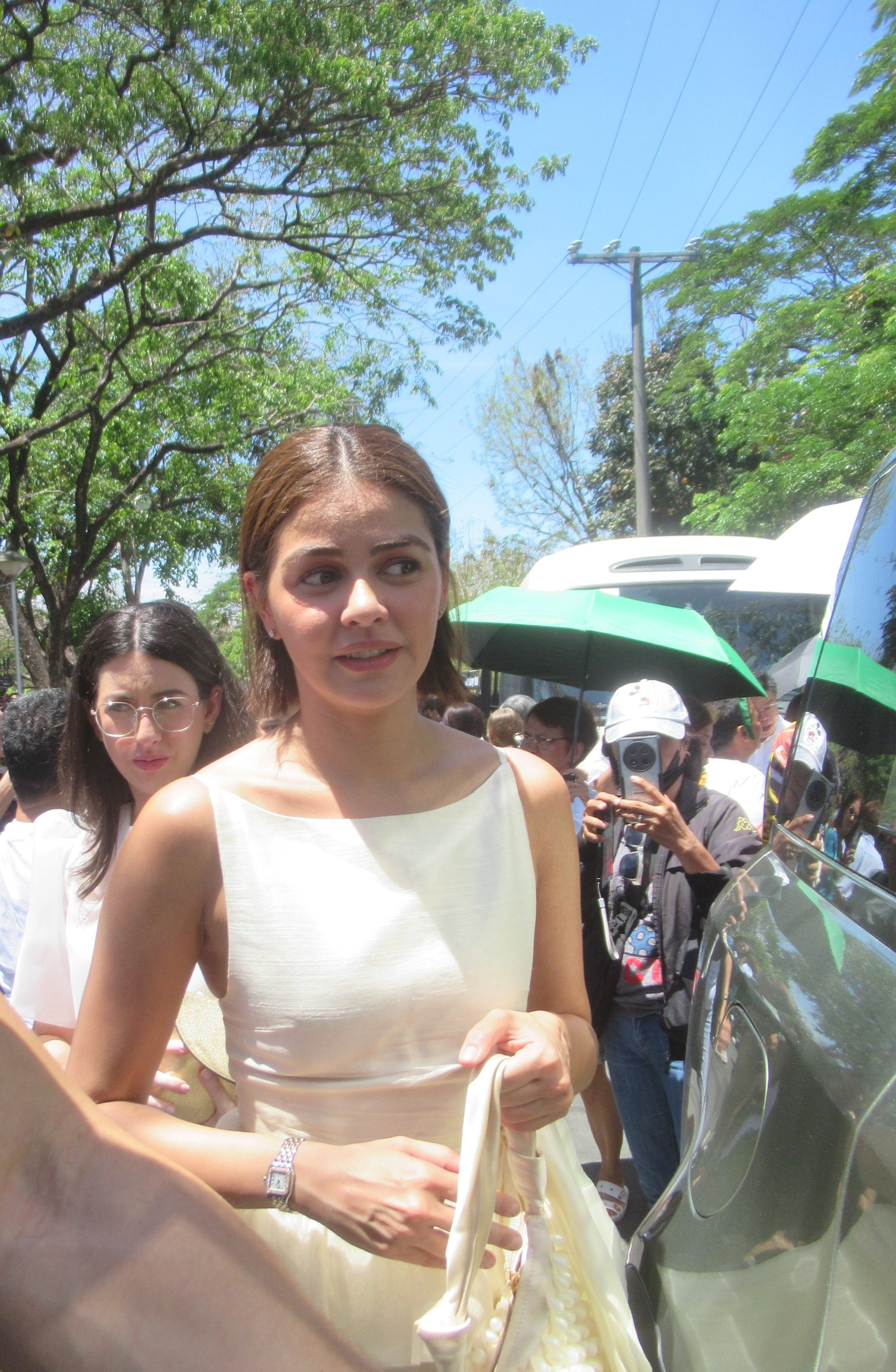
Gutierrez in 2025 at Libingan ng mga Bayani.

Gutierrez's grandmothers, Pilita Corrales and Nora Aunor, died four days apart: April 12 and April 16, 2025, respectively.

== Filmography ==
Key
†	Denotes films or TV productions that have not yet been released

=== Film ===
Year	Title	Role	Notes	Ref.
2015	Buy Now, Die Later	Young Maita	41st Metro Manila Film Festival entry & Also her debut movie.	
2016	Lila	Jess	2nd Sinag Maynila Film Festival entry	
2016	Dagsin	Young Corazon	12th Cinemalaya Independent Film Festival entry	
2017	Spirit of the Glass 2: The Haunted	Sabrina		
2017	Pastor	Katrina "Trina" Aguila		
2019	Elise	Elise		
2019	Babae at Baril	Babae	7th QCinema International Film Festival entry	
2021	Dito at Doon	Len		
2021	Ikaw	Dulce Celeste / Dee		
2022	Ngayon Kaya	Amihan Fernandez		
2022	Bakit Hindi Mo Sabihin	Nat Bernales		
2024	Phantosmia	Reyna	81st Venice International Film Festival entry	
2026	Mag-iina (The Mothering)	Anj	22nd Cinemalaya Independent Film Festival entry	

=== Television ===
Year	Title	Role	Notes	Ref.
2011–2013	Party Pilipinas	Herself		
2012	My Beloved	Joanne Ledesma		
2012	Makapiling Kang Muli	Lynley Valencia	Supporting Role / Protagonist	
2012	Together Forever	Jasmine "Jas" Trinidad		
2013	Magpakailanman	Jerry	Episode: "Sa kabila ng hirap: The Garrido Family Story"	
2013–2014	Villa Quintana	Lynette Quintana / Maricel Mangaron	Main Role / Protagonist	
2014–2015	More Than Words	Erika "Ikay" Balmores / Katy Perez	Main Role / Protagonist	
2015–2016	Dangwa	Maria "Rosa" Capulong	Main Role / Protagonist	
2016	Little Nanay	Carmela Villon-Batongbuhay		
2016	Magpakailanman	Rhoda	Episode: "Ina ko Aswang"	
2016	Once Again	Reign Soriano / Desiree "Des" Mateo / Paula Carbonnel		
2016	Encantadia	Agua		
2016	Dear Uge	Janice	Episode: "Surprise Date"	
2016	Usapang Real Love	Yapi	Episode: "Relationship Goals"	
2017	Legally Blind	Grace Evangelista-Villareal	Main Role / Protagonist	
2017	Magpakailanman	Adult Jackie	Episode: "Laglag bata: Ang Ina kong Abortionista"	
2018	Sherlock Jr.	Irene Manansala	Guest Role / Protagonist	
2018	Magpakailanman	Sofia Gosiengfiao	Episode: "When Love Conquers All: The Wil Dasovich and Alodia Gosiengfiao Story"	
2018	Dear Uge	Ayanna	Episode: "Something Strange in the Neighborhood"	
2018	Victor Magtanggol	Gwen Regalado		
2019	Daddy's Gurl	Mina (guest)		
2019	Dragon Lady	Celestina "Yna" Sanchez-Chan / Scarlet Del Fuego	Main Role / Protagonist	
2019	Dear Uge	Marcie	Episode: "The Perfect Gift Daw O'"	
2019–2020	Pepito Manaloto	Hazel Anne		
2021–present	ASAP XP	Herself / Host / Performer		
2021	Maalaala Mo Kaya	Jexter Leira Vilar	Episode: "Quarantine Pass"	
2021–2022	Marry Me, Marry You	Camille Miraflor-Legaspi	Main Role / Protagonist	
2022	Sleep With Me	Harry		
2023	Dirty Linen	Alexa Salvacion / Mila Dela Cruz	Main Role / Protagonist	
2024–2025	Lavender Fields	Iris Buenavidez-de Vera	Main Role / Antagonist	
2026	The Loyalty Game	Silvana "Ana" Madrigal-Santos	Main Role / Protagonist	
2026	Balaraw	Sabina Tejeros	Main Role / Protagonist	

== Awards and nominations ==
Year	Award giving body	Award	Work/Nominee	Result	Ref.
2013	Golden Screen TV Awards	Outstanding Breakthrough Performance by an Actress	Makapiling Kang Muli	Nominated	
2014	62nd FAMAS Awards	German Moreno Youth Achievement Award	Herself	Won	
2017	Nickelodeon Kids' Choice Awards	Favorite Pinoy Star	Herself	Nominated	
2017	40th Gawad Urian Awards	Best Supporting Actress	Dagsin	Nominated	
2017	4th Urduja Heritage Awards	Best Supporting Actress	Dagsin	Won	
2019	7th QCinema International Film Festival	Pylon Award for Best Actress	Babae At Baril	Won	
2020	2nd Laguna Excellence Awards	Outstanding Indie Film Actress of the Year	Babae At Baril	Won	
2020	22nd Gawad Pasado	Pinakapasadong Aktres	Babae At Baril	Pending	
2020	43rd Gawad Urian Awards	Best Actress	Babae At Baril	Won	
2020	68th FAMAS Awards	Best Actress	Babae At Baril	Won	
2020	7th Urduja Heritage Film Awards	Best Actress	Babae At Baril	Won	
2021	20th New York Asian Film Festival	Screen International Rising Star Asia Award	Herself	Won	
