= Babae at Baril =

2019 noir film directed by Rae Red

- Official movie poster, released in 2019.
- Directed by: Rae Red
- Written by: Rae Red
- Produced by: Iana Celest Bernardez; Bianca Balbuena Liew; Guido Zabaltero; Sienna Olaso; Vitto Lazatin
- Starring: Janine Gutierrez; Felix Roco; Elijah Canlas; JC Santos
- Cinematography: Tey Clamor
- Edited by: Ilsa Malsi
- Music by: Fatima Nerikka Salim; Immanuel Verona
- Production companies: Cignal Entertainment; EpicMedia
- Release date: October 13, 2019
- Running time: 80 minutes
- Country: Philippines
- Language: Filipino

Babae at Baril (English: The Woman and the Gun) is a 2019 Filipino neo noir crime drama film directed by Rae Red. Starring Janine Gutierrez, Felix Roco, Elijah Canlas, and JC Santos, the film depicts a downtrodden department store saleslady who discovers a gun on her doorstep and the drastic changes in her life as she discovers how much power owning a gun can give her.

Produced by Cignal Entertainment and EpicMedia, the film was theatrically released on October 13, 2019, as one of the official entries for the QC International Film Festival. It was also part of the Cignal Play streaming service. The film premiered in the United States at the New York Asian Film Festival on August 28, 2020, according to GMA Network. Additionally, it was available for virtual viewing in the US through the festival until September 12, 2020.

== Plot ==
In the 1970s, Sonny is working as a policeman and is provided a gun by gun dealer, Eduardo. His son, Miguel, plays with his gun but Sonny warns his son not to do so, as it is a dangerous weapon. Sonny takes a side job to assassinate a student leader. Sonny was injured in the operation and became incapacitated.

In the late 2010s, Miguel is now working as a policeman. He goes to a volleyball court and makes a purchase from a balut vendor Jun who moonlights as a drug dealer. Jun is able to deduce that Miguel is after him and tries to escape from Miguel. Jun taunts Miguel and gives Miguel his gun (the same gun used by his father Sonny) and orders Jun to shoot him. Jun is unwilling to do so and runs and hides in a pushcart the entire night. The next day, Jun is pursued by a gang of boys who have been hired by Jun to abduct him. Jun threatens to shoot them with his gun, and they back down. Later, Steph, one of those who pursued Jun, finds Jun alone. Steph helps Jun and gives him some money and tells him to leave the city. Jun agrees to do so, and Jun gives Steph his gun.

Steph is chided by his gang for helping Jun. Steph denies that he did so. The rest of the group plans a robbery of a house. Steph insists to join the robbery. Later, he finds himself on his own. He ends up shooting the female occupant of the house and later throws away his gun in a bin outside the house. His fate is unclear as gunshots are heard after he drops his gun. His body is found bloody on the streets in a later scene.

Scenes in the life of a woman are shown, where she has been dealing with various abusing and domineering men in her life. Her store manager humiliates her during daily uniform inspections when he tells her to change her stockings as they are already damaged. A sari-sari store owner rudely sells her soiled sanitary napkins. A street gang (the same gang that pursued Jun, and which includes Steph) heckles her and asks her for sex. When she reaches home, she finds her landlord peeping on her female roommate as she has sex with her boyfriend.

After another occasion of being humiliated by her store manager, the woman’s male colleague gifts her two sets of stockings, asking her to try them on to see which one will fit her. While she tries on the stockings, the male colleague suddenly forces himself on her sexually. The woman goes home and finds the gun outside her house, after hearing gunshots fired. The woman gains confidence with the gun that she finds. She tries to make a purchase from the sari-sari store owner, and after she is once again treated rudely, she fires the gun in the store and the owner pleads with her not to kill him.

She finds her roommate being sexually violated by her boyfriend and she threatens to shoot the boyfriend and asks him to leave. Finally, she reports for work the next day and is once again accosted by her store manager about her damaged stockings. She takes off her stockings and forces her manager to eat the stockings. She leaves the store, being chased by store security. Later, she hunts down her male colleague on his way home. She confronts him and intends to kill him. She changes her mind and shoots the ground beside him instead. The male colleague escapes. She throws the gun to the Pasig River, and she escapes the scene as well by running into the crowd that comes in to look for the source of the gunfire sounds. The movies ends with the fate of the woman uncertain.

== Cast ==
- Janine Gutierrez as Babae
- Felix Roco as Male Colleague
- JC Santos as Miguel
- Elijah Canlas as Jun
- Sky Teotico as Steph
- Ruby Ruiz as Old Lady
- Archi Adamos as Eduardo
- Alan Paule as Sonny

== Release ==
Cignal Entertainment and EpicMedia released the film on as one of the official entries for the QC International Film Festival. Janine Gutierrez won the Best Actress award. In the 2020 Gawad Urian Awards, the film won Best Picture, Best Director, Best Actress, Best Cinematography (Tey Clamor), Best Editing (Ilsa Malsi), and Best Production Design (Eero Yves Francisco).

== Themes ==
=== Women and violence ===
Babae at Baril contains strong feminist themes, inspired by director Rae Red's experience of watching films and searching for women protagonists, as she could not recall a character in the films she watched as a child that she could look up to or relate to. The film also touches on issues present in Philippine society including poverty, continuous sexual discrimination and harassment that women face, as Red believed issues concerning gender go hand in hand with the Philippines' economic state, and the systems in place. Red said that the movie was a way for her to let loose all the anger she has for what women have to go through each day.

=== Duterte drug war and extrajudicial killings ===
The film was made in the middle of the Philippine drug war during the administration of Rodrigo Duterte who served as President of the Philippines from 2016 to 2022. The anti-drug campaign was ostensibly intended to reduce the proliferation of illegal drugs in the country but was attended by extrajudicial killings allegedly perpetrated by the police and unknown assailants.

The scenes of Jun mirror the real-life occurrences in the murder of Kian delos Santos.

Red mentioned that the Philippine drug war and poverty are related to how society treats women.

== Reception ==
=== Critical reception ===
Gary Daviles, writing for the Manunuri ng Pelikulang Pilipino, describes the film as "deceptively simple with all the features of film noir, from cynicism, dark alleys settings, stark lighting, frequent flashbacks, interweaving plots, and an underlying existentialism." However, "The film may be considered as noir but with what is happening the film is painfully too real."

=== Awards and recognition ===
Year	Group	Category	Nominee	Result
2019	QCinema International Film Festival Awards	Best Picture - Asian Next Wave Competition	Babae at Baril	Nominated
2019	QCinema International Film Festival Awards	Best Director	Rae Red	Won
2019	QCinema International Film Festival Awards	Best Actress	Janine Gutierrez	Won
2019	QCinema International Film Festival Awards	Best Actor	JC Santos	Nominated
2019	QCinema International Film Festival Awards	Best Artistic Achievement	Babae at Baril	Nominated
2019	QCinema International Film Festival Awards	Best Screenplay	Babae at Baril	Nominated
2019	QCinema International Film Festival Awards	Gender Sensitivity Award	Babae at Baril	Won
2020	Gawad Urian Awards (Manunuri ng Pelikulang Pilipino)	Best Picture	Babae at Baril	Won
2020	Gawad Urian Awards (Manunuri ng Pelikulang Pilipino)	Best Direction	Babae at Baril	Won
2020	Gawad Urian Awards (Manunuri ng Pelikulang Pilipino)	Best Actress	Janine Gutierrez	Won
2020	Gawad Urian Awards (Manunuri ng Pelikulang Pilipino)	Best Supporting Actor	JC Santos	Nominated
2020	Gawad Urian Awards (Manunuri ng Pelikulang Pilipino)	Best Screenplay	Rae Red	Nominated
2020	Gawad Urian Awards (Manunuri ng Pelikulang Pilipino)	Best Production Design	Eero Yves Francisco	Won
2020	Gawad Urian Awards (Manunuri ng Pelikulang Pilipino)	Best Music	Fatima Nerikka Salim, Immanuel Verona	Nominated
2020	Gawad Urian Awards (Manunuri ng Pelikulang Pilipino)	Best Cinematography	Tey Clamor	Won
2020	Gawad Urian Awards (Manunuri ng Pelikulang Pilipino)	Best Editing	Ilsa Malsi	Won
2020	2020 FAMAS Awards	Best Actress	Janine Gutierrez	Won
2020	2020 FAMAS Awards	Best Picture	Babae at Baril	Nominated
2020	2020 FAMAS Awards	Best Director	Rae Red	Nominated
2020	2020 FAMAS Awards	Best Screenplay	Rae Red	Nominated
2020	2020 FAMAS Awards	Best Cinematography	Tey Clamor	Won
2020	2020 FAMAS Awards	Best Production Design	Eero Yves Francisco	Won
2020	2020 FAMAS Awards	Best Editing	Efren Jarlego	Nominated
2020	2020 FAMAS Awards	Best Production Design	Tony Aguilar	Nominated
