= Statefields School =

Private school in Cavite, Philippines

Statefields School, Inc.

Location
- National Road, Molino; Bacoor, Cavite; Philippines; 14°23′33″N 120°58′36″E

Information
- Type: Private, Non-sectarian
- Motto: Excellence Through Multiple Intelligences, Positive Values and 21st Century Skills
- Established: 2000
- President: Mr. Felix Y. Hofileña
- Faculty: Over 150
- Grades: K to 12
- Enrollment: Approx. 2500
- Campus: Urban
- Colors: Blue█, Red█, Cream█, and Green█.
- Song: SSI HYMN
- Nickname: Statefields, SSI, Stallions
- Ideology: Multiple Intelligences by Howard Gardner
- Website: www.statefields.edu.ph

Statefields School, Inc. (SSI) is a private, non-sectarian school located along the National Rd. in Molino III, Bacoor, Cavite. It offers preschool, elementary, junior high school and senior high school education.

Starting from the school year 2024-2025, Statefields School, Inc. will celebrate its 25th anniversary with the theme "Commemorating Holism in Intelligences and Character (C.H.I.C. @25)".

History: At the turn of the millennium, a school along the National Road in Molino III, Bacoor, Cavite chronicled its birth - Statefields School, Inc. The Hofileña Family, known and respected in the field of real estate and construction, started realizing a vision on a one-hectare piece of land near Wood Estate Village II, a subdivision which the family developed. They envisioned a school that would be noted for its quality education. Through intensive marketing, we saw an unexpected turnout of 1,200 enrollees, which marked the event's success and set the pace for others to follow. Starting on its second year of operation through School Year 2015-2016, the school has been able to maintain a population of a little more than 2500 from Preschool to Junior High School. By School Year 2016-2017, it started offering Senior High School with provisions for 200 or more students to be accommodated in each of Grades 11 and 12.
