= Barber's Tales =

2013 drama film by Jun Robles Lana

- Film poster
- Directed by: Jun Robles Lana
- Written by: Jun Robles Lana
- Story by: Peter Ong Lim; Elmer Gatchalian; Benedict Mique; Jun Robles Lana
- Produced by: Jun Robles Lana; Perci M. Intalan; Ramel L. David; Joselito C. Oconer; Michael P. Tuviera; Ferdinand Lapuz; Antonio P. Tuviera
- Starring: Eugene Domingo; Eddie Garcia; Iza Calzado
- Cinematography: Carlo C. Mendoza
- Edited by: Lawrence S. Ang
- Music by: Ryan Cayabyab
- Production companies: APT Entertainment; Octobertrain Films
- Release dates: October 18, 2013 (Tokyo International Film Festival); August 13, 2014 (Philippines)
- Running time: 120 minutes
- Country: Philippines
- Language: Filipino

Barber's Tales (Filipino: Mga Kuwentong Barbero) is a 2013 Filipino drama film written, co-produced, and directed by Jun Robles Lana, based on a story concept he co-developed with Peter Ong Lim, Elmer Gatchalian, and Benedict Mique. Set during the end of the Marcos regime, the film stars Eugene Domingo as Marilou, a widow who is forced to take her late husband's job as a community barber. The film is the follow-up to Lana's film Bwakaw and second of a trilogy focused on the small-town life in the Philippines.

The film, a competing entry, had its world premiere at the 26th Tokyo International Film Festival in Japan on October 18, 2013, where it won the Best Actress Award for Eugene Domingo's performance. It was later given a commercial release in the Philippines on August 13, 2014.

== Plot ==
The events of the film are set in a rural town during the Marcos dictatorship. Soldiers regularly pass through in search of rebel activities and disappearing anyone implicated in them.

When her husband Jose suddenly dies, Marilou assumes his role as the village barber. Business is initially slow as people deem it unusual for a woman to cut men's hair. After volunteering to cut the town priest Fr. Arturo's hair, Marilou draws the attention of Mayor Alfredo and befriends his battered wife Cecilia. Marilou's work with the mayor revives interest in the barbershop. One night, however, Marilou discovers her godson Edmond and his companion Renan hiding in the barbershop. Renan was wounded after the two had an armed encounter with soldiers, revealing themselves to be rebel fighters. A reluctant Marilou treats Renan and contacts his sister Rosa upon his request. Grateful for reuniting with her brother, Rosa, a prostitute, convinces her clients to have their hair cut by Marilou. Edmond later returns and asks Marilou for permission to use her barbershop as a meeting place for his comrades but she dissuades him from joining the rebels. She later changes her mind, however, when soldiers kill Fr. Arturo at the behest of the mayor for having allegedly smuggled rebel firearms.

Renan is later killed in a botched ambush that leaves Edmond wounded. He seeks help from Rosa who secretly brings him to the barbershop. However, the next day, Edmond is seen by Marilou's customers while escaping from the military, leading the village to ostracize Marilou. Some time later, Cecilia asks Marilou to accompany her to the river. They rest on a nearby cliff where Cecilia expresses gratitude for their friendship and her frustrations at her husband's serial adultery because of her inability to bear children. Cecilia then kisses Marilou before throwing herself off the cliff to her death. As the only witness to Cecilia's suicide, Marilou is pressured into silence by Alfredo who publicly reframes his wife's death as the result of a rebel attack. While cutting the mayor's hair for a presidential visit through the town, Marilou fatally stabs Alfredo with a pair of scissors and goes into hiding. The military surrounds the village in search for Marilou but with help from the townspeople, she escapes during a Holy Week procession, never to be seen again.

Rumors begin to circulate about Marilou's fate ranging from her starting a new life in Manila to becoming another victim of the regime. The film ends with a scene depicting Marilou as a recruit in the rebel army, assuming the alias "Luz", the name Cecilia would have given to her first child.

== Cast ==
- Eugene Domingo as Marilou
- Daniel Fernando as Jose
- Eddie Garcia as Father Arturo
- Sue Prado as Rosa
- Shamaine Buencamino as Tess
- Nicco Manalo as Edmond
- Gladys Reyes as Susan
- Nonie Buencamino as Mayor Bartolome
- Iza Calzado as Cecilia Bartolome
- Nora Aunor as guerilla leader (cameo appearance)
- Soliman Cruz as guerilla member (cameo appearance)

== Production ==
Barber's Tales originated from an original screenplay written by filmmaker Jun Robles Lana in 1997, which received recognition at the Palanca Awards. The material draws from Lana's childhood experiences in the Bicol region and from the history of his clan, whose members across generations included priests, soldiers, and insurgents.

=== Filming ===
The filming took three weeks to shoot in the remote town of General Nakar, Quezon.

== Reception ==
=== Critical reception ===
Clarence Tsui, writing for The Hollywood Reporter, gave praise to the film's numerous aspects, including Eugene Domingo's acting performance as Marilou, where she was commended for "very controlled and somewhat internal" delivery and filmmaker Jun Lana's direction and screenwriting. However, he had concerns about its production design, where he commented that the sets were similar to a usual TV drama set.

Dennis Harvey, writing for Variety, gave a mixed-to-positive review, with praise towards Domingo's acting, Lana's melodramatic direction, and a screenplay set during a political turmoil. While the film is "solid enough", it was described as a "less inspired" follow-up to Lana's previous work Bwakaw.

=== Accolades ===
Award	Date	Category	Recipient	Result	Ref.
26th Tokyo International Film Festival	October 25, 2013	Tokyo Sakura Grand Prix (Best Picture)	Barber's Tales by Jun Robles Lana	Nominated	
26th Tokyo International Film Festival	October 25, 2013	Best Actress	Eugene Domingo	Won	
8th Asian Film Awards	March 27, 2014	Best Actress	Eugene Domingo	Nominated	
17th Udine Far East Film Festival	May 2014	Audience Award	Barber's Tales by Jun Robles Lana	3rd	
