= Kalel, 15 =

2019 drama film by Jun Robles Lana

- Official movie poster
- Directed by: Jun Robles Lana
- Screenplay by: Jun Robles Lana
- Produced by: Jun Robles Lana; Ferdinand Lapuz; Vitto P. Lazatin; Sienna G. Olaso; Guido R. Zaballero
- Starring: Elijah Canlas
- Cinematography: Carlo Mendoza
- Edited by: Benjamin G. Tolentino
- Music by: Teresa Barrozo
- Production company: The IdeaFirst Company; Octobertrain Films; Cignal Entertainment
- Release dates: November 29, 2019 (PÖFF); December 18, 2019 (Philippines)
- Running time: 104 minutes
- Country: Philippines
- Language: Filipino

Kalel, 15 is a 2019 Philippine drama film written, co-produced, and directed by Jun Robles Lana. Shot in monochrome, the film stars Elijah Canlas as the titular 15-year old teenager who was infected with HIV. It also features a supporting cast including Jaclyn Jose, Eddie Garcia, Cedrick Juan, Sue Prado, and Gabby Padilla.

Produced by The IdeaFirst Company, Octobertrain Films, and Cignal Entertainment, the film was premiered on November 29, 2019, as one of the enteries at the Tallinn Black Nights Film Festival in Estonia, and theatrically released in the Philippines on December 18.

== Plot ==
Kalel and his mother, Edith, are seen in a clinic speaking to medical professionals. During their commute from the hospital, Edith is angry at him and asks him how he could have contracted the disease. Edith tells Kalel not to tell anyone about the diagnosis. They arrive at the carinderia or canteen where Edith works and his sister, Ruth, is seen minding the business.

That night, Kalel posts a selfie on social media, with a "good night" caption. He is also seen browsing his Twitter account where he is communicating with various men, asking about his personal details and appearing to be making arrangements for meet ups.

The next day, Kalel is doing chores with Edith. Ruth complains that she still has to work on her rest day, and Edith retorts that she has to work each day to feed the family. Edith tells Ruth to have her boyfriend wear condoms during sex, as Ruth has already had an abortion due to an unwanted pregnancy. Ruth storms off in the discussion. Edith asks if Kalel had told Ruth about his diagnosis and he says that he has not.

Kalel's high school student life in a Catholic school is shown. Kalel's friends and his girlfriend Sue notice that he has been distant. Kalel reasons that he had been distant only because he was busy with chores. Sue wonders how the good night photo that Kalel posts could have received more than 1,000 likes. Kalel says that they were from his fans. Kalel later takes suggestive photos of himself without his face and posts them on his social media. His biological father, Fr. George, a Catholic priest, who serves as parish priest in a different community, visit Kalel and his mother. Fr. George knows about Kalel's diagnosis and tries to elicit how he got infected. Kalel does not respond.

Later, Kalel and Sue are in a party. Kalel ignores Sue and dances animatedly on his own, and later with another girl. Sue confronts Kalel and asks him what changed between them. Kalel ignores her, and Sue leaves, angry. When Kalel gets home that night, Edith confronts him, asking why he hasn't been responding to her messages and asks about the expensive comics books she found in Kalel's belongings. Kalel responds angrily, saying that him having HIV shouldn't make her act that way. Ruth overhears Kalel and asks Edith and Kalel about this. Edith tells Ruth not to say anything about Kalel's HIV diagnosis, saying that Ruth had spread the news of her own abortion.

One day, Kalel is asked by Edith to go to Fr. George's church to get money for his tuition. Fr. George hands Kalel an envelope with money. As Kalel is leaving, Fr. George hands him a bottle of virgin coconut oil, saying that it would be helpful for his condition based on his research. Kalel later uses some of the money he received to purchase a self-balancing scooter and ice cream. When he gets home, he applies some of the virgin coconut oil on the HIV rashes on his chest that are now visible. He sees Edith surreptitiously meeting with Mon, her boyfriend, who is also the pedicab driver that takes Edith to the carinderia every day, with her cooking supplies.

One day in school, Sue asks Kalel to accompany her home, while her parents are away. At her home, Sue starts to perform fellatio on him to distract him in order to handcuff him to the banisters. Sue kisses Kalel's neck and bites his lips and sucks the blood that she draws. Kalel escapes, taking the handcuffs with him. At home, Ruth sees Kalel trying to take off his handcuffs. Kalel refuses to explain his situation, but Ruth helps him pick his handcuffs.

On the way to school one day, Kalel witnesses Mon's wife confront Edith and Mon in public about their affair. Kalel goes home that day and finds Edith and Ruth drinking. Edith invites them to drink as equals, and invites them to ask her anything. When Edith is asleep, Kalel convinces Ruth to ask who her father is. Ruth refuses. Later, Edith leaves the family home and elopes with Mon. She says she will return one day.

Kalel's life unravels from then on. The money that Edith left Kalel and Ruth for rent is quickly wasted by his sister on drugs. Ruth's boyfriend Danny moves in their home and is abusive of Kalel. Kalel visits a doctor in a community center complaining about his HIV sores which have become very itchy. The doctor says that Kalel needs to do his part to get better, and that he and Edith have never participated in the counseling sessions they arranged. Kalel asks if HIV could have been transmitted from kissing and from his blood being sucked. Kalel finds out Ruth had been hospitalized in Manila for two weeks. Kalel visits her and they agree to reconcile.

Kalel and his friends are drinking in his house one day and Danny finds them and feeds them each a pill. The pill gets Kalel and his friends in a relaxed state. Each of the boys confess secrets and Kalel confesses that that he has HIV. Later in school, his friends start distancing themselves from him and Ruth confronts him about his condition, saying that her prolonged illness was because she had contracted HIV from him. Kalel attacks his friends who had spread the news about his condition to people in school. Kalel ends up being chased and he escapes. Later, he goes home and finds himself locked out. He is told by a neighbor that his sister had been arrested due to a confrontation with their landlord, as their rent hadn't been paid in months.

Kalel tries to bring Ruth home from the police station but the police inform him that she will need to be bailed out. Kalel forces his way home, eats spoiled food and suffers from food poisoning. His friends smash his home's windows by throwing rocks. Kalel tries to get help from Fr. George. Although sick, Fr. George gives him some money to pay for that month's rent, promising to give more to pay for the arrears. However Fr. George refuses to help with bail for Ruth, as she is not his child. On his way out from the church, Kalel finds the image of the dead Christ. Kalel spits on the image and the scene blacks out.

In the final scene, Kalel is seen dressed in expensive clothes on his scooter, meeting with a man who has hired Kalel for sex. Kalel's eyes are empty as they leave for the rendezvous point.

== Cast ==
- Elijah Canlas as Kalel Fernandez, a 15-year-old boy who is HIV positive. This is Canlas' first lead role. He originally auditioned for the role in 2014 but was not accepted – back then the character was envisioned as a mestizo who is a son of a Spanish friar The director would eventually tap him to play the character in 2018.
- Jaclyn Jose as Edith, Kalel's mother
- Eddie Garcia as George, Kalel's estranged father, who is also a Catholic priest.
- Gabby Padilla as Sue, Kalel's girlfriend.
- Elora Españo as Ruth, Kalel's sister
- Cedrick Juan as Danny, Ruth's boyfriend
- Sue Prado as Mameng
- Giovanni Baldisseri as Mon
- Akira Morishita as Balmaceda
- Ruby Ruiz as Osang

== Production ==
Kalel, 15 was produced under The IdeaFirst Company, Octobertrain Films, and Cignal Entertainment. with Jun Robles Lana as the director. Carlo Mendoza was the cinematographer. The film reportedly took five years to make.

The film under the working title Our Father was pitched by Lana at the Hong Kong Asia Film Financing Forum in 2014. In 2019, the film was promoted as Son of God at the HAF Work-In-Progress Lab.

The film made in black-and-white, tackles about the stigma of HIV/AIDS, the attitude of Filipino youth on sex, and how the consequences of a dysfunctional family dynamic and "Christian double moral".

== Release ==
Kalel, 15 premiered at the 23rd Tallinn Black Nights Film Festival which began on November 29, 2019, in Tallinn, Estonia. It would have a theatrical release in select cinemas in the Philippines on December 18, 2019.

The film became available for streaming at Netflix on December 9, 2020.

== Reception ==
=== Critical reception ===
Vanessa Zarm, writing for Film Matters Magazine, praised the director and his technical choices, including monochrome photography and reducing the aspect ratio to convey the titular character's loneliness and cynicism to the viewer. Elijah Canlas' performance as the HIV-infected teenager was also commended, citing that he performed realistically.

=== Accolades ===
Accolades received by GomBurZa
Award	Date of ceremony	Category	Recipient(s)	Result	Ref.
23rd Tallinn Black Nights Film Festival	2019	Jury Prize for Best Director	Jun Robles Lana	Won	
59th Asia-Pacific Film Festival	January 8, 2020	Best Editing	Benjamin Tolentino	Won	
17th Asian Film Festival (Rome, Italy)	August 5, 2020	Best Actor	Elijah Canlas	Won	
43rd Gawad Urian Awards	November 10, 2020	Best Actor	Elijah Canlas	Won	
43rd Gawad Urian Awards	November 10, 2020	Best Screenplay	Jun Robles Lana	Won	
16th Harlem International Film Festival	May 14, 2021	Best Actor	Elijah Canlas	Won	
