= List of Philippine films of 2018 =

This is an incomplete list of Filipino full-length films, both mainstream and independently produced, released in theaters and cinemas in 2018.

== Box office ==
- – an entry film for Metro Manila Film Festival.

Highest-grossing films of 2018
Rank	Title	Distributor	Gross	Ref.
1	The Hows of Us	Star Cinema	₱810 million	
2	Fantastica	Star Cinema, Viva Films	₱596 million	
3	Exes Baggage	Black Sheep Productions	₱355 million	
4	Kasal	Star Cinema	₱170 million	
5	Sid & Aya: Not a Love Story	Viva Films	₱160 million	
6	Ang Dalawang Mrs. Reyes	Star Cinema, Quantum Films, The IdeaFirst Company	₱150 million	
7	Miss Granny	Viva Films	₱140 million	
8	My Perfect You	Star Cinema	₱136 million	
9	Aurora	Viva Films	₱107 million	

== Films ==
=== January–March ===
Opening		Title	Production company	Cast and crew	Genre	Ref.
J A N U A R Y	17	Mama's Girl	Regal Entertainment	Connie Macatuno (director); Sofia Andres, Diego Loyzaga, Jameson Blake, Sylvia Sanchez	Romance, comedy	
J A N U A R Y	17	Ang Dalawang Mrs. Reyes	Star Cinema, Quantum Films, The IdeaFirst Company	Jun Lana (director); Judy Ann Santos, Angelica Panganiban	Comedy	
J A N U A R Y	24	Fallen Not Forgotten	Caelestis Productions	Adrian Belic, Sally Jo Bellosillo (documentarists)	Documentary	
J A N U A R Y	24	Mr. & Mrs. Cruz	Viva Films, The IdeaFirst Company	Sigrid Andrea Bernardo (director); Ryza Cenon, JC Santos	Romance, drama	
J A N U A R Y	31	Changing Partners^{*(2018 commercial release)}	Cinema One Originals, Star Cinema	Dan Villegas (director); Agot Isidro, Jojit Lorenzo, Sandino Martin, Anna Luna	Musical, drama	
F E B R U A R Y	7	Meet Me in St. Gallen	Viva Films, Spring Films	Irene Villamor (director); Bela Padilla, Carlo Aquino	Romance, drama	
F E B R U A R Y	14	My Fairy Tail Love Story	Regal Entertainment, The Idea First Company	Perci Intalan (director); Janella Salvador, Elmo Magalona, Kiko Estrada	Romance, fantasy	
F E B R U A R Y	14	Sin Island	Star Cinema	Gino M. Santos (director); Coleen Garcia, Xian Lim, Nathalie Hart	Erotic thriller	
F E B R U A R Y	21	The Significant Other	Cineko Productions, Star Cinema	Joel Lamangan (director); Lovi Poe, Tom Rodriguez, Erich Gonzales	Drama, romance	
F E B R U A R Y	28	Amnesia Love	Viva Films	Albert Langitan (director); Paolo Ballesteros, Yam Concepcion	Romance, comedy	
M A R C H	7	Magbuwag ta Kay...^{*(2018 commercial re-release)}	Viva Films, Heritage Productions	Reuben Joseph Aquino, Janice Perez (directors); Rowell Ucat, Akiko Solon	Romance, comedy	
M A R C H	7	Ang Pambansang Third Wheel	Viva Films, The IdeaFirst Company	Ivan Payawal (director); Yassi Pressman, Sam Milby	Romance, comedy	
M A R C H	7	Abomination^{*(2018 commercial release)}	Solar Entertainment, Brillante Mendoza	Yam Laranas (director); Tippy Dos Santos, Toni Moynihan, Justine Peña, Paul Holmes, Lukas Magallano	Crime, mystery, thriller	
M A R C H	7	Bomba^{*(2018 commercial release)}	Solar Entertainment, Brillante Mendoza	Ralston Jover (director); Allen Dizon, Angellie Nicholle Sanoy, Allan Paule, Sue Prado, Kate Brios, Joel Saracho	Drama	
M A R C H	7	El Peste	Solar Entertainment, Brillante Mendoza	Richard Somes (director); Mon Confiado, Jean Judith Javier, Alvin Anson, Leon Miguel, Tikoy Aguiluz, Jim Libiran	Horror, drama	
M A R C H	7	Melodrama/Random/Melbourne!	Solar Entertainment, Brillante Mendoza	Matthew Victor Pastor (director); Celina Yuen, Bridget O'Brien, Rachel Javier, Khoa Le, Matt Furlani, Vlady T	Drama, musical, thriller	
M A R C H	7	Tale of the Lost Boys^{*(2018 commercial release)}	Solar Entertainment, Brillante Mendoza	Joselito Altarejos (director); Oliver Aquino, Ta Su	Drama	
M A R C H	14	My Perfect You	Star Cinema	Cathy Garcia-Molina (director); Gerald Anderson, Pia Wurtzbach	Romance, comedy	
M A R C H	21	Simplicity	iDOLTap Productions and Studios Inc.	David Hulbert, Kazuhiko Parungao (directors); Mary Joy Apostol, Alexa Miro, Nami Onuma, Riva Quenery, Kelly Welt	Comedy, musical	
M A R C H	31	Never Not Love You	Viva Films, Project 8 Corner San Joaquin Projects	Antoinette Jadaone (director); James Reid, Nadine Lustre	Romance, drama	

Color key

– a Sinag Maynila Film Festival entry film

=== April–June ===
Opening		Title	Production company	Cast and crew	Genre	Ref.
A P R I L	11	Almost a Love Story	BG Productions International	Louie Ignacio (director); Barbie Forteza, Derrick Monasterio	Romance	
A P R I L	18	DOTGA: Da One That Ghost Away	Star Cinema	Tony Y. Reyes (director); Ryan Bang, Maymay Entrata, Edward Barber, Kim Chiu	Horror, comedy	
A P R I L	20	Throwback Today^{*(2018 commercial release)}	Cinema One Originals, Star Cinema	Joseph Teoxon (director); Carlo Aquino, Annicka Dolonius, Kat Galang	Sci-fi	
M A Y	2	Single/Single: Love Is Not Enough	Cinema One, The Philippine Star, Star Cinema	Veronica Velasco, Pablo Biglang-Awa, Jr. (directors); Shaina Magdayao, Matteo Guidicelli	Romance, drama	
M A Y	9	My 2 Mommies	Regal Entertainment	Eric Quizon (director); Solenn Heussaff, Paolo Ballesteros, Maricel Soriano	Comedy, drama	
M A Y	9	Squad Goals: #FBois	Viva Films	Mark Meily (director); Julian Trono, Vitto Marquez, Andrew Muhlach, Daniel Huschka, Jack Reid	Youth-oriented	
M A Y	9	Delia and Sammy	CineFilipino	Therese Cayaba (director); Rosemarie Gil, Jaime Fabregas, Nico Antonio	Drama	
M A Y	9	The Eternity Between Seconds	CineFilipino	Alec Figuracion (director); TJ Trinidad, Yeng Constantino	Romance	
M A Y	9	Excuse Me Po	CineFilipino	Ronald Batallones (director); Elizabeth Oropesa	Drama, crime	
M A Y	9	Gusto Kita with All My Hypothalamus	CineFilipino	Dwein Baltazar (director); Nicco Manalo, Dylan Rae Talon, Soliman Cruz, Anthony Falcon	Romance	
M A Y	9	Hitboy	CineFilipino	Bor Ocampo (director); Adrian Cabido	Action, crime	
M A Y	9	Mata Tapang	CineFilipino	Rod Marmol (director); Edgar Allan Guzman, Arron Villaflor	Drama, comedy	
M A Y	9	Mga Mister ni Rosario	CineFilipino	Alpha Habon (director); Joross Gamboa, Kate Alejandrino	Romantic comedy	
M A Y	9	Poon	CineFilipino	Roni Benaid (director); Glydel Mercado, Shy Carlos	Horror	
M A Y	16	Kasal	Star Cinema	Ruel Bayani (director); Bea Alonzo, Paulo Avelino, Derek Ramsay	Romance, drama	
M A Y	23	Citizen Jake	Cinema Artists Philippines, Solar Pictures	Mike de Leon (director); Atom Araullo	Noir, crime, drama	
M A Y	23	So Connected	Regal Entertainment	Jason Paul Laxamana (director); Jameson Blake, Janella Salvador	Romance	
M A Y	30	Ang Misyon: A Marawi Siege Story	GreatCzar Media Productions, Star Cinema	Caesar Soriano (director); Martin Escudero	Historical	
M A Y	30	Season of the Devil	Sine Olivia Pilipinas, Epicmedia Productions, Globe Studios	Lav Diaz (director/screenplay); Piolo Pascual, Shaina Magdayao, Bituin Escalante, Pinky Amador	Musical, drama	
M A Y	30	Sid & Aya: Not a Love Story	Viva Films, N^{2} Productions	Irene Villamor (director); Dingdong Dantes, Anne Curtis	Romantic drama	
J U N E	20	Cry No Fear	Viva Films	Richard V. Somes (director/screenplay); Ron Bryant (screenplay); Ella Cruz, Donnalyn Bartolome	Horror	
J U N E	27	The Write Moment^{*(2018 commercial release)}	Viva Films, The IdeaFirst Company	Dominic Lim (director); Jerald Napoles, Valeen Montenegro	Romantic comedy, drama	
J U N E	27	Walwal	Regal Entertainment	Jose Javier Reyes (director); Elmo Magalona, Donny Pangilinan, Kiko Estrada, Jerome Ponce	Drama, youth-oriented	

Color key

– a CineFilipino entry film

=== July–September ===
Opening		Title	Production company	Cast and crew	Genre	Ref.
J U L Y	4	The Maid in London	Viva Films	Danni Ugali (director); Andi Eigenmann	Romantic comedy, drama	
J U L Y	11	I Love You, Hater	Star Cinema	Giselle Andres (director); Julia Barretto, Joshua Garcia, Kris Aquino	Romantic comedy	
J U L Y	18	Jacqueline Comes Home (The Chiong Story)	Viva Films	Ysabelle Peach Caparas (director); Meg Imperial, Donnalyn Bartolome	Crime thriller	
J U L Y	25	Kusina Kings	Star Cinema	Victor Villanueva (director); Zanjoe Marudo, Empoy Marquez	Comedy	
A U G U S T	1	BuyBust	Viva Films	Erik Matti (director); Anne Curtis, Brandon Vera	Action thriller	
A U G U S T	1	Harry & Patty	Cineko Productions	Julius Alfonso (director); Kakai Bautista, Ahron Villena	Romantic comedy	
A U G U S T	3	Distance	Cinemalaya	Perci Intalan (director); Iza Calzado, Nonie Buencamino, Therese Malvar	Family drama	
A U G U S T	3	Kung Paano Hinihintay ang Dapithapon	Cinemalaya	Carlo Enciso Catu (director); Dante Rivero, Menggie Cobarrubias, Perla Bautista	Drama	
A U G U S T	3	Kuya Wes	Cinemalaya	James Robin Mayo (director); Ogie Alcasid, Ina Raymundo	Comedy drama	
A U G U S T	3	Liway	Cinemalaya	Kip Oebanda (director); Glaiza de Castro, Dominic Roco	Period drama	
A U G U S T	3	The Lookout	Cinemalaya	Afi Africa (director); Andres Vasquez, Yayo Aguila, Jay Garcia, Elle Ramirez	Action thriller	
A U G U S T	3	Mamang	Cinemalaya	Denise O'Hara (director); Celeste Legaspi, Ketchup Eusebio	Drama	
A U G U S T	3	ML	Cinemalaya	Benedict Mique, Jr. (director); Eddie Garcia, Tony Labrusca	Thriller	
A U G U S T	3	Musmos Na Sumibol sa Gubat ng Digma	Cinemalaya	Iar Arondaing (director); Junayka Sigrid Santarin, JM Salvado, Star Orjaliza	Social drama	
A U G U S T	3	Pan de Salawal	Cinemalaya	Che Espiritu (director); Bodjie Pascua, Miel Espinosa	Family comedy	
A U G U S T	3	School Service	Cinemalaya	Louie Ignacio (director); Ai-Ai delas Alas, Joel Lamangan	Thriller	
A U G U S T	8	Dito Lang Ako	Mixsonic Productions, Lightscape Digital	Roderick Lindayag (director); Michelle Vito, Jon Lucas, Akihiro Blanco, Boots Anson-Roa, Freddie Webb	Period romance	
A U G U S T	15	Ang Babaeng Allergic sa Wifi	Cignal Entertainment, Octobertrain Films, The IdeaFirst Company	Jun Lana (director); Sue Ramirez, Jameson Blake, Markus Paterson	Romantic comedy	
A U G U S T	15	Bakwit Boys	T-Rex Entertainment	Jason Paul Laxamana (director); Devon Seron, Vance Larena, Nikko Natividad, Ryle Santiago, Mackie Empuerto	Musical romance, drama	
A U G U S T	15	The Day After Valentine's	Viva Films	Jason Paul Laxamana (director); Bela Padilla, JC Santos	Romantic drama	
A U G U S T	15	Dark Is the Night^{*(2018 commercial release)}	Deus Lux Mea Films, Sound Investment Equity, Swift Productions, Oro de Siete Productions	Adolfo Alix, Jr. (director/screenplay); Gina Alajar, Phillip Salvador, Bembol Roco, Felix Roco	Crime drama	
A U G U S T	15	Pinay Beauty	Quantum Films, MJM Productions, Epic Media	Jay Abello (director); Chai Fonacier, Edgar Allan Guzman, Janus del Prado, Nico Antonio	Comedy drama	
A U G U S T	15	Signal Rock	CSR Films PH, Regal Entertainment	Chito Roño (director); Christian Bables	Family drama	
A U G U S T	15	Unli Life	Regal Entertainment	Miko Livelo (director); Vhong Navarro, Wynwyn Marquez, Joey Marquez	Comedy	
A U G U S T	15	We Will Not Die Tonight	Strawdogs Studio Production, EG Films, Outpost Visual Frontier	Richard V. Somes (director); Erich Gonzales, Alex Medina, Thou Reyes, Max Eigenmann	Action thriller	
A U G U S T	22	The Lease	Utmost Creatives	Paolo Bertola (director); Garie Concepcion, Ruben Maria Soriquez	Psychological horror	
A U G U S T	22	Miss Granny	Viva Films, N^{2} Productions	Joyce Bernal (director); Sarah Geronimo, Nova Villa, James Reid, Xian Lim	Fantasy comedy drama	
A U G U S T	29	The Hows of Us	Star Cinema	Cathy Garcia-Molina (director/screenplay); Carmi G. Raymundo, Crystal S. San Miguel, Gillian Ebreo (screenplay); Kathryn Bernardo, Daniel Padilla, Darren Espanto, Jean Garcia	Romantic drama	
S E P T E M B E R	5	Goyo: The Boy General	TBA Studios, Artikulo Uno Productions, Globe Studios	Jerrold Tarog (director/screenplay); Rody Vera (screenplay); Paulo Avelino, Carlo Aquino, Mon Confiado, Epy Quizon	Biographical war film	
S E P T E M B E R	5	Petmalu	Red Nine Entertainment, Larger Than Life Studios	Joven Tan (director/screenplay); Diego Loyzaga, Marlo Mortel, Michelle Vito, Vitto Marquez	Teen comedy	
S E P T E M B E R	12	The Hopeless Romantic	Regal Entertainment	Topel Lee (director); Pepe Herrera, Ritz Azul	Romantic comedy	
S E P T E M B E R	12	Wander Bra	Bluerock Entertainment, Viva Films	Joven Tan (director/screenplay); Kakai Bautista, Myrtle Sarrosa	Superhero	
S E P T E M B E R	12	1957	ToFarm	Hubert Tibi (director); Ronwaldo Martin, Richard Quan, Menggie Cobarrubias	Historical drama	
S E P T E M B E R	12	Alimuom	ToFarm	Keith Sicat (director); Ina Feleo, Epy Quizon, Mon Confiado, Dido de la Paz, Kiko Matos, Elora Españo	Fantasy, sci-fi	
S E P T E M B E R	12	Mga Anak ng Kamote	ToFarm	Carlo Enciso Catu (director); Katrina Halili, Alex Medina, Carl Guevara, Kiko Matos, Rash Juzen	Drama	
S E P T E M B E R	12	Kauyagan (Way of Life)	ToFarm	Julienne Ilagan (director); Bayang Barrios, Perry Dizon, Waway Saway, Jefferson Bringas, Salima Saway	Drama	
S E P T E M B E R	12	Sol Searching	ToFarm	Roman Perez Jr. (director); Pokwang, Joey Marquez	Dark comedy	
S E P T E M B E R	12	Tanabata’s Wife	ToFarm	Charlson Ong, Lito Casaje (directors); Miyuki Kamimura, Mai Fanglayan	Romance	
S E P T E M B E R	19	Abay Babes	Viva Films	Don Cuaresma (director); Cristine Reyes, Nathalie Hart, Meg Imperial, Roxanne Barcelo, Kylie Verzosa	Comedy	
S E P T E M B E R	19	Nakalimutan Ko Nang Kalimutan Ka	Wilbros Films	Fifth Solomon (director); Alex Gonzaga, Vin Abrenica	Drama	
S E P T E M B E R	21	Hapi ang Buhay: The Musical	EBC Films	Carlo Ortega Cuevas (director); John Stevenson Tabangay, Edward Rudolf Flores, Ervil Escano, Jr., Dennis Rey Garcia, Wilson Tapalla, Mia Suarez, Mike Magat, Antonio Aquitania, Victor Neri	Comedy	
S E P T E M B E R	26	Exes Baggage	Black Sheep Productions, Star Cinema	Dan Villegas (director); Angelica Panganiban, Carlo Aquino, Dionne Monsanto, Joem Bascon	Romance	
S E P T E M B E R	26	The Trigonal: Fight for Justice	Cinefenio Film Studios, Viva Films	Vincent Soberano (director); Ian Ignacio, Rhian Ramos	Action thriller	

Color key

- – a Cinemalaya Philippine Independent Film Festival entry film
- – a Pista ng Pelikulang Pilipino entry film
- – a ToFarm (The Outstanding Farmers in the Philippines) Film Festival entry film

=== October–December ===
Opening		Title	Production company	Cast and crew	Genre	Ref.
O C T O B E R	3	Para sa Broken Hearted	Viva Films, Sari-Sari Films	Digo Ricio (director); Yassi Pressman, Shy Carlos, Louise delos Reyes, Marco Gumabao, Sam Concepcion	Romance, drama	
O C T O B E R	3	Tres	Imus Productions, CineScreen	Dondon Santos, Richard V. Somes (directors); Jolo Revilla, Bryan Revilla, Luigi Revilla, Princess Cadavona	Action	
O C T O B E R	10	Wild and Free	Regal Entertainment	Connie S.A Macatuno (director); Derrick Monasterio, Sanya Lopez	Romance, drama	
O C T O B E R	12	Asuang	Cinema One Originals	Raynier Brizuela (director); Alwyn Uytingco, Jon Lucas, Chai Fonacier, Nats Sitoy, Jun Sabayton	Fantasy, comedy	
O C T O B E R	12	Bagyong Bheverlynn	Cinema One Originals	Charliebebs Gohetia (director); Ruffa Mae Quinto, Edgar Allan Guzman	Romantic comedy	
O C T O B E R	12	Double Twisting Double Back	Cinema One Originals	Joseph Abello (director); Joem Bascon, Tony Labrusca	Sports thriller	
O C T O B E R	12	Hospicio	Cinema One Originals	Bobby Bonifacio (director); Loisa Andalio, Mary Joy Apostol, Ana Abad Santos	Horror	
O C T O B E R	12	Mamu: And a Mother Too	Cinema One Originals	Rod Singh (director); Iyah Mina, Arron Villaflor, EJ Jallorina	Comedy drama	
O C T O B E R	12	Never Tear Us Apart	Cinema One Originals	Whammy Alcazaren (director); Ricky Davao, Meryll Soriano, Jasmine Curtis-Smith	Horror drama	
O C T O B E R	12	Paglisan	Cinema One Originals	Carl Joseph Papa (director); Ian Veneracion, Eula Valdes	Animated musical	
O C T O B E R	12	Pang MMK	Cinema One Originals	John Lapus (director); Neil Coleta, Nikki Valdez, Joel Torre, Ricky Davao, Cherry Pie Picache	Comedy	
O C T O B E R	12	A Short History of a Few Bad Things	Cinema One Originals	Keith Deligero (director); Victor Neri, Jay Gonzaga	Crime drama	
O C T O B E R	17	First Love	Ten17P, Star Cinema, Viva Films	Paul Soriano (director); Aga Muhlach, Bea Alonzo	Romantic drama	
O C T O B E R	21	All Grown Up	QCinema	Wena Sanchez (documentarist)	Documentary	
O C T O B E R	21	Billie & Emma	QCinema	Samantha Lee (director); Gabby Padilla, Zar Donato, Beauty Gonzalez, Cielo Aquino, Ryle Santiago	Coming-of-age drama	
O C T O B E R	21	Dog Days	QCinema	Timmy Harn (director); Ybes Bagadiong, Bie Ruaro, Charles Salazar, Miguel Reyes, Adrienne Vergara	Coming-of-age drama	
O C T O B E R	21	Hintayan ng Langit	QCinema	Dan Villegas (director); Juan Miguel Severo (screenplay); Eddie Garcia, Gina Pareño, Joel Saracho, Kat Galang	Comedy drama	
O C T O B E R	21	Masla a Papanok	QCinema	Gutierrez Mangansakan II (director); Quennie Lyne Demoral, Krigi Hager, Ameir Arsad Hassan	Historical drama	
O C T O B E R	21	Come on Irene	QCinema	Keisuke Yoshida (director); Yusuke Iseya, Nats Sitoy, Ken Yasuda	Drama	
O C T O B E R	21	Oda sa Wala	QCinema	Dwein Baltazar (director); Marietta Subong, Joonee Gamboa, Anthony Falcon, Dido Dela Paz	Drama	
O C T O B E R	21	Pag-ukit sa Paniniwala	QCinema	Hiyas Baldemor Bagabaldo (documentarist)	Documentary	
O C T O B E R	31	To Love Some Buddy	Black Sheep Productions, Star Cinema	Jason Paul Laxamana (director/screenplay); Maja Salvador, Zanjoe Marudo, Donny Pangilinan, Phoebe Walker	Romantic comedy	
O C T O B E R	31	All Souls Night	Viva Films, Aliud Entertainment	Aloy Adlawan, Jules Katanyag (directors); Andi Eigenmann	Horror, suspense, thriller	
N O V E M B E R	7	Class of 2018	T-Rex Entertainment	Charliebebs Gohetia (director); Sharlene San Pedro, Nash Aguas	Romantic thriller	
N O V E M B E R	14	Kung Paano Siya Nawala	TBA Studios	Joel Ruiz (director); JM de Guzman, Rhian Ramos	Romance	
N O V E M B E R	14	Through Night and Day	Viva Films, MAVX Productions, OctoArts Films	Veronica Velasco (director); Alessandra de Rossi, Paolo Contis	Romance	
N O V E M B E R	17	Glorious	iWant Originals	Connie Macatuno (director); Angel Aquino, Tony Labrusca	Romance	
N O V E M B E R	17	Ma	iWant Originals	Kenneth Dagatan (director); Anna Luna, Glydel Mercado	Horror	
N O V E M B E R	17	Aria	Holy Angel University	Carlo Enciso Catu (director)	Historical drama	
N O V E M B E R	21	Recipe for Love	Regal Entertainment	Jose Javier Reyes (director); Christian Bables, Cora Waddell	Romance	
N O V E M B E R	28	Ang Pangarap Kong Holdap	MAVX Productions	Marius Talampas (director); Pepe Herrera, Jerald Napoles, Jelson Bay, Paolo Contis	Crime comedy	
N O V E M B E R	28	Three Words to Forever	Star Cinema	Cathy Garcia-Molina (director); Sharon Cuneta, Richard Gomez, Kathryn Bernardo	Family drama	
D E C E M B E R	5	Kahit Ayaw Mo Na	Viva Films, BluArt Productions	Bona Fajardo (director); Empress Schuck, Kristel Fulgar, Andrea Brillantes	Drama	
D E C E M B E R	5	Everybody Loves Baby Wendy	iWant Originals	Wenn V. Deramas (director); Alex Gonzaga	Comedy	
D E C E M B E R	25	Aurora	Viva Films, Aliud Entertainment	Yam Laranas (director); Anne Curtis, Marco Gumabao, Ricardo Cepeda, Marita Zobel	Horror	
D E C E M B E R	25	Fantastica	Star Cinema, Viva Films	Barry Gonzalez (director); Vice Ganda, Richard Gutierrez, Dingdong Dantes, Maymay Entrata, Edward Barber, Bela Padilla	Fantasy, comedy	
D E C E M B E R	25	The Girl in the Orange Dress	Quantum Films, MJM Productions	Jay Abello (director); Jericho Rosales, Jessy Mendiola	Romantic comedy	
D E C E M B E R	25	Jack Em Popoy: The Puliscredibles	CCM Productions, M-Zet Productions, APT Entertainment	Michael Tuviera (director); Vic Sotto, Maine Mendoza, Coco Martin	Action comedy	
D E C E M B E R	25	Mary, Marry Me	Ten17P, TINCAN	RC Delos Reyes (director); Toni Gonzaga, Alex Gonzaga, Sam Milby	Comedy drama	
D E C E M B E R	25	One Great Love	Regal Entertainment	Eric Quizon (director); Dennis Trillo, Kim Chiu, and JC de Vera	Romance	
D E C E M B E R	25	Otlum	Horseshoe Productions	Joven Tan (director); Ricci Rivero, Jerome Ponce	Horror comedy	
D E C E M B E R	25	Rainbow's Sunset	Heaven's Best Entertainment	Joel Lamangan (director); Eddie Garcia, Tony Mabesa, Gloria Romero	Drama, romance	

Color key

- – a Cinema One Originals Film Festival entry film
- – a QCinema International Film Festival entry film
- – a Metro Manila Film Festival entry film

== Awards ==
=== Local ===
The following first list shows the Best Picture winners at the four major film awards: FAMAS Awards, Gawad Urian Awards, Luna Awards and Star Awards; and at the three major film festivals: Metro Manila Film Festival, Cinemalaya and Cinema One Originals. The second list shows films with the most awards won from the four major film awards and a breakdown of their total number of awards per award ceremony.

Award/festival	Best Picture		Ref.
67th FAMAS Awards	Gusto Kita with All My Hypothalamus		
42nd Gawad Urian Awards	BuyBust		
37th Luna Awards	Goyo: Ang Batang Heneral		
35th Star Awards for Movies	Rainbow's Sunset	Citizen Jake	
29th Young Critics Circle Citations	Sa Palad ng Dantaong Kulang		
21st Gawad Pasado	(tied) Rainbow's Sunset, Kasal, Bomba, Aria, Kuya Wes		
17th Gawad Tanglaw	Citizen Jake		
3rd Eddys Awards	Liway		
44th Metro Manila Film Festival	Rainbow's Sunset		
14th Cinemalaya Independent Film Festival	Kung Paano Hinihintay ang Dapithapon		
14th Cinema One Originals Film Festival	Paglisan		
7th CineFilipino Film Festival	The Eternity Between Seconds		
6th QCinema International Film Festival	Oda sa Wala		
4th Sinag Maynila Film Festival	Tale of the Lost Boys		
3rd ToFarm Film Festival	Tanabata's Wife		
2nd Pista ng Pelikulang Pilipino	Signal Rock		

Film	Total	FAMAS	Urian	Luna	Star
BuyBust	8	0	4	1	3
Citizen Jake	7	0	1	0	6
Goyo: Ang Batang Heneral	6	1	0	3	2
Rainbow's Sunset	5	0	0	0	5
Gusto Kita with All My Hypothalamus	5	2	0	3	0
Liway	4	0	0	3	1
Signal Rock	3	0	1	2	0
Never Tear Us Apart a.k.a. Fisting	3	2	1	0	0
ML	3	1	1	0	1
