= 35th PMPC Star Awards for Movies =

2018 Philippine Movie Press Club awards

35th Star Awards for Movies
- Date: June 2, 2019
- Site: New Performing Arts Theater, Resorts World Manila
- Hosted by: Iza Calzado; Gelli de Belen; Kathryn Bernardo; Aljur Abrenica; Robi Domingo; Arci Munoz

Highlights
- Best Picture: Rainbow's Sunset; Citizen Jake (Indie)

The 35th PMPC Star Awards for Movies by the Philippine Movie Press Club (PMPC), honored the best Filipino films of 2018. The ceremony took place on June 2, 2019 at New Performing Arts Theater, Resorts World Manila.

The PMPC Star Awards for Movies was hosted by Iza Calzado, Gelli de Belen, Kathryn Bernardo , Aljur Abrenica, Robi Domingo and Arci Munoz. Rainbow's Sunset won the biggest awards including Movie of the Year, Movie Director of the Year and Movie Ensemble Acting of the Year, while Citizen Jake won the Indie Movie of the Year, Indie Movie Ensemble of the Year and Indie Movie Director of the Year.

== Winners and nominees ==
The following are the nominations for the 35th PMPC Star Awards for Movies, covering films released in 2018.

Winners are listed first and indicated in bold.

=== Major categories ===
Movie of the Year	Indie Movie of the Year
Winner: **Rainbow's Sunset** – Heaven's Best Entertainment: Ang Dalawang Mrs. Reyes – Star Cinema, Quantum Films, The Idea First Company; Buy Bust – Reality Entertainment and Viva Films; Goyo: Ang Batang Heneral – TBA Studios and Globe Studios; Signal Rock – Regal Entertainment and CSR Productions; The Hows Of Us – Star Cinema; Through Night And Day – Viva Films, Octo Arts Films, MavX Productions	Winner: **Citizen Jake** – Cinema Artists Philippines: Distance – Cinemalaya Foundation, The Idea First Company, CMB Film Services; Hintayan Ng Langit – QCinema, Project 8 Corner San Joaquin Projects, Globe Studios; Bakwit Boys – T-Rex Entertainment Productions; Kung Paano Hinihintay Ang Dapithapon – Cinemalaya Foundation, Cleverminds Inc., Cineko Productions; Liway – Cinemalaya Foundation, VY/AC Productions, Exquisite Aspect; ML – Cinemalaya Foundation, Lonewolf Films, CMB Film Service
Movie Ensemble Acting of the Year	Indie Movie Ensemble Acting of the Year
Winner: **Rainbow's Sunset** – Heaven's Best Entertainment: Signal Rock – Regal Entertainment and CSR Productions; Buy Bust – Reality Entertainment and Viva Films; Goyo: Ang Batang Heneral – TBA Studios and Globe Studios	Winner: **Citizen Jake** – Cinema Artists Philippines: Bakwit Boys – T-Rex Entertainment Productions; Distance – Cinemalaya Foundation, The Idea First Company, CMB Film Services; Hintayan Ng Langit – QCinema, Project 8 Corner San Joaquin Projects, Globe Studios; Kung Paano Hinihintay Ang Dapithapon – Cinemalaya Foundation, Cleverminds Inc., Cineko Productions; Liway – Cinemalaya Foundation, VY/AC Productions, Exquisite Aspect; ML – Cinemalaya Foundation, Lonewolf Films, CMB Film Services
Movie Director of the Year	Indie Movie Director of the Year
Winner: **Joel Lamangan** — **Rainbow's Sunset**: Cathy Garcia-Molina – The Hows Of Us; Erik Matti – Buy Bust; Jun Robles Lana – Ang Dalawang Mrs. Reyes; Chito Roño – Signal Rock; Jerrold Tarog — Goyo: Ang Batang Heneral; Veronica Velasco – Through Night And Day	Winner: **Mike De Leon** – Citizen Jake: Carlo Enciso Catu — Kung Paano Hinihintay Ang Dapithapon; Perci Intalan – Distance; Jason Paul Laxamana – Bakwit Boys; Benedict Mique — ML; Kip Oebanda — Liway; Dan Villegas – Hintayan Ng Langit
Movie Actor of the Year	Movie Actress of the Year
Winner: **Ogie Alcasid** – **Kuya Wes**: Nonie Buencamino — Distance; Paolo Contis – Through Night And Day; Dingdong Dantes – Sid And Aya: Not A Love Story; Eddie Garcia – Rainbow's Sunset; Coco Martin – Jack Em Popoy; Daniel Padilla – The Hows of Us; Piolo Pascual – Ang Panahon Ng Halimaw; James Reid – Never Not Love You; Vic Sotto – Jack Em Popoy	Winner: Tied between **Kathryn Bernardo**– **The Hows Of Us** and **Sarah Geronimo** – **Miss Granny**: Iza Calzado – Distance; Anne Curtis – Buy Bust; Glaiza De Castro — Liway; Alessandra De Rossi – Through Night And Day; Nadine Lustre – Never Not Love You; Gina Pareño – Hintayan Ng Langit; Gloria Romero – Rainbow's Sunset; Judy Ann Santos – Ang Dalawang Mrs. Reyes
Movie Supporting Actor of the Year	Movie Supporting Actress of the Year
Winner: **Arjo Atayde** – **Buy Bust**: Art Acuña – Goyo: Ang Batang Heneral; Joem Bascon – Double Twisting, Double Back; Tirso Cruz III – Rainbow's Sunset; Gabby Eigenmann – Citizen Jake; Teroy Guzman – Citizen Jake; Tony Labrusca – ML; Joel Lamangan – School Service; Jeffrey Quizon – Goyo: Ang Batang Heneral; Arron Villaflor – Mamu And A Mother Too	Winner: **Cherie Gil** – **Citizen Jake**: Ria Atayde – The Hows of Us; Angeli Bayani – Walwal; Max Collins – Citizen Jake; Sunshine Dizon – Rainbow's Sunset; Jean Garcia – The Hows Of Us; Therese Malvar – Distance; Aiko Melendez – Rainbow's Sunset; Daria Ramirez – Signal Rock; Nova Villa – Miss Granny
New Movie Actor of the Year	New Movie Actress of the Year
Winner:**Danzel Fernandez** – **Otlum** and **Ryle Santiago** – **Bakwit Boys**: Atom Araullo – Citizen Jake; Darren Espanto – The Hows Of Us; Danzel Fernandez – Otlum; Dennis Garcia – Hapi Ang Buhay; Tony Labrusca – ML; Iyah Mina – Mamu And A Mother Too; Donny Pangilinan – Walwal; Ricci Rivero – Otlum; Brandon Vera – Buy Bust	Winner: **Sanya Lopez** – **Wild And Free**: Iana Bernardez – Gusto Kita with All My Hypothalamus; Garie Concepcion – The Lease; Kisses Delavin – Walwal; Mai Fanglayan – Tanabata's Wife; Ali Forbes – Rainbow's Sunset; Winwyn Marquez – Unli Life; Gabby Padilla – Billie And Emma; Heaven Peralejo – Harry And Patty; Mia Suarez – Hapi Ang Buhay
Movie Child Performer of the Year
Winner: **Kenken Nuyad** – **Liway**: Harvey Almoneda – The Lease; Noel Comia, Jr. – Rainbow's Sunset; Jill Demski – The Lease; Mackie Empuerto – Bakwit Boys; Miel Espinoza – Pan De Salawal; Alessandra Malonzo — Distance

=== Technical categories ===
Movie Original Screenplay of the Year	Indie Movie Original Screenplay of the Year
Winner: **Eric Ramos** – **Rainbow's Sunset**: Noreen Capili and Alessandra De Rossi – Through Night and Day; Carmi Raymundo, Gillian Ebreo and Cathy Garcia-Molina – The Hows of Us; Jun Robles Lana and Elmer Gatchalian – Ang Dalawang Mrs Reyes; Rodel Naciancieno – Jack Em Popoy: The Puliscredibles; Rody Vera – Signal Rock; Rody Vera and Jerrold Tarog – Goyo: Ang Batang Heneral	Winner: **Mike de Leon, Atom Araullo, and Noel Pascual** - **Citizen Jake**
Movie Cinematographer of the Year	Indie Movie Cinematographer of the Year
Winner: **Pong Ignacio** – **Goyo: Ang Batang Heneral**: Neil Daza – Signal Rock; Neil Derrick Bion – Buy Bust; Shayne Sarte – First Love; Noel Teehankee – The Hows of Us; Noel Teehankee – Through Night And Day; Rain Yamson, II – Rainbow's Sunset	Winner: **Neil Daza** - **Kung Paano Hinihintay ang Dapithapon**
Movie Production Designer of the Year	Indie Movie Production Designer of the Year
Winner: **Roy Lachica** – **Goyo: Ang Batang Heneral**: Jay Custodio – Rainbow's Sunset; Michael Español and Roma Regala – Buy Bust; Marxie Maolen Fadul – Ang Dalawang Mrs Reyes; Erik Manalo – Through Night and Day; Mark Sabas – Signal Rock; 'Norico Santos – The Hows of Us	Winner: **Ana Lou Sanchez - (Hintayan ng Langit)**
Movie Editor of the Year	Indie Movie Editor of the Year
Winner: **Jay Halili** – **Buy Bust**: Mai Calapardo – Rainbow's Sunset; Marya Ignacio and Noemi Paguiligan – The Hows of Us; Carlo Francisco Manatad – Signal Rock; Maynard Pattaui – Ang Dalawang Mrs Reyes; Jerrold Tarog – Goyo: Ang Batang Heneral; Noah Tonga – Through Night and Day	Winner: **Gerone Centeno and Tim Estera, III** - **Citizen Jake**
Movie Musical Scorer of the Year	Indie Movie Musical Scorer of the Year
Winner: **Len Calvo** – **Miss Granny**: Jessie Lasaten – The Hows of Us; Jessie Lasaten – Through Night and Day; Erwin Romulo and Malek Lopez – Buy Bust; Jerrold Tarog – Goyo: Ang Batang Heneral; Emerzon Texon – Ang Dalawang Mrs Reyes; Emerzon Texon – Rainbow's Sunset	Winner: **Paulo Protacio** - **Bakwit Boys**
Movie Sound Engineer of the Year	Indie Movie Sound Engineer of the Year
Winner: **Steve Vesagas and Whannie Dellosa** – **Buy Bust**: Lamberto Casas Jr and Aian Louie Caro – Through Night and Day; Lamberto Casas Jr and Albert Michael Idioma – Ang Dalawang Mrs Reyes; Albert Michael Idioma – Goyo: Ang Batang Heneral; Albert Michael Idioma – Signal Rock; Albert Michael Idioma and Alex Tomboc – Rainbow's Sunset; Allen Roy Santos – The Hows of Us	Winner: **Lamberto Casas, Albert Ichael Idioma and Aian Caro** - **ML**
Movie Original Theme Song of the Year	Indie Movie Original Theme Song of the Year
Winner: **Sa 'Yo Na"** – From the movie Rainbow's Sunset / Composed and arranged by Emerzon Texon, interpreted by Ice Seguerra: "Akala"– From the movie The Day After Valentine's / Composed, arranged, and interpreted by Marion Aunor; "All Tonight" – From the movie Exes Baggage / Composed and arranged by Len Calvo, interpreted by Midnight Meetings; "Dahil Kasama" – From the movie Fantastica / Composed by Obra Maestra, arranged by Theo Martel, interpreted by Vice Ganda and Obra Maestra; "Tropa" – From the movie Walwal / Composed by Mark Robin Ortiguero, arranged by Joaquin Santos, interpreted by Mark Robin Ortiguero, Karlo Maglasang, Adrian Mojado, and Mark Anthony Atienza	Winner: **"Hapi Ang Buhay"**

=== Short Films ===
Short Film Movie of the Year	Short Film Movie Director of the Year
Winner: Tied between **10 Seconds** (Sonza Entertainment Productions) and **Talulot** (EAB Productions): Ang Nagliliyab Na Kasaysayan Ng Pamilya Dela Cruz – (Alab View Pictures); Kasilyas – (Kaleidoscope Productions and Bulsu Cinephilia; Kiss – (Likhang Silangan Entertainment); Palabas – (Pelikmata Productions); Si Astri Maka Si Tambulah – (Hombrella Pictures)	Winner: **Joey Austria** – **Talulot**: Harlene Bautista – Kiss; Miguel Louie De Guzman – Ang Nagliliyab Na Kasaysayan Ng Pamilya Dela Cruz; Mike Magat – 10 Seconds; Leslie Ann Ramirez — Kasilyas; Arjanmar Rebeta – Palabas; Xeph Suarez — Si Astri Maka Si Tambulah

=== Special awards ===
Darling of the Press	Movie Loveteam of the Year
Darling of the Press Winner: **Daniel Fernando**: Angel Locsin; Coco Martin; Piolo Pascual; Alden Richards; Sylvia Sanchez; Yul Servo	Movie Loveteam of the Year Winner: **Kathryn Bernardo and Daniel Padilla** – **The Hows Of Us**: Angelica Panganiban and Carlo Aquino – Exes Baggage; Barbie Forteza and Derrick Monasterio – Almost A Love Story; Coco Martin and Maine Mendoza – Jack Em Popoy; Donny Pangilinan and Kisses Delavin – Walwal; Gerald Anderson and Pia Wurtzbach – My Perfect You; James Reid and Nadine Lustre – Never Not Love You; Joshua Garcia and Julia Barretto – I Love You, Hater; Maymay Entrata and Edward Barber – Fantastica; Nash Aguas and Sharlene San Pedro – Class Of 2018

=== Mga Natatanging Bituin ng Siglo ===
The Bituin ng Siglo awardees (Outstanding Stars of the Century) are special awards given to actors for their remarkable contribution to the Philippines cinema.

- Nora Aunor
- Tirso Cruz III
- Christopher de Leon
- Joseph Estrada
- Eddie Garcia
- Anita Linda
- Niño Muhlach
- Ramon Revilla Sr
- Susan Roces
- Gloria Romero
- Phillip Salvador
- Vilma Santos

=== Outstanding Pillars of Philippine Movie Press Club (PMPC) ===
- Ethel Ramos
- Ronald Constatino
- Veronica Samio
- Letty Celli

=== Other awards ===
- Frontrow Male and Female Celebrity of the Night - **Robi Domingo** and **Iza Calzado**
- Glupa Glowing Guy of the Night - **Jameson Blake**
- Glupa Glowing Gal Award - **Kira Balinger**
- Nora Aunor Ulirang Artista Award: **Dante Rivero**
- Ulirang Alagad ng Pelikula Sa Likod ng Camera: **Laurice Guillen**
