= List of awards and nominations received by Dennis Trillo =

Dennis Trillo awards and nominations
Awards and nominations
Award	Wins	Nominations
Asian Television Awards	1	2
FAMAS Awards	3	6
Gawad Tanglaw	1	2
Gawad Pasado	0	2
Gawad Urian Awards	1	6
Golden Screen Awards	4	6
Golden Screen TV Awards	2	2
Luna Awards	1	3
MMFF	3	5
PEP List Awards	1	2
Star Awards for Movies	4	7
Star Awards for TV	1	7
Young Critics Circle	1	1
The Eddys Awards	2	2
PAFTA Awards	1	1

Totals (Note: Certain award groups do not simply award one winner. They acknowledge several different recipients, have runners-up, and have third place. Since this is a specific recognition and is different from losing an award, runner-up mentions are considered wins in this award tally. For simplification and to avoid errors, each award in this list has been presumed to have had a prior nomination.)
- Wins: 38
- Nominations: 30

Filipino actor Dennis Trillo is one of the most decorated actors of his generation and known by the industry as Asia' Drama King. He is the 13th actor to achieve "FULS Awards", winning all five major film acting awards for Best Actor awards category from Gawad Urian Award, Luna Award (PAF), FAMAS Award, PMPC Star Awards for Movies and Youth Critics Circle Awards.

He has won a total of 38 awards including 1x Gawad Urian Award, 1x Luna Award (FAP), 3x FAMAS Award, 5x PMPC Star Awards for Movies, 1x Youth Critics Circle Award, 3x Metro Manila Film Festival Award (MMFF), 6x Golden Screen Movie Awards, 2x Golden Screen TV Awards, 1x PMPC Star Awards for Television, 1x Philippine Arts, Film and Television Awards (PAFTA), 1x The EDDYS Award, 1x GMMSF Guillermo Mendoza Box Office Entertainment Awards, 1x Gawad Pasado Award, 1x Gawad Tanglaw Award and 1x Manila Critics Circle Award.

Internationally, Trillo has won for 2 Best Actor for Green Bones in Asia category and national category at 2025 Asian Academy Creative Awards and a Best Actor awards at the International Golden Summit Excellence Award in Vietnam and an Asian Star Prize for my My Faithful Husband at the Seoul International Drama Awards. His acting in My Husband's Lover series was highly commended at the Asian Television Awards.

== International Awards ==
=== Asian Academy Creative Awards ===
Year	Nominated work	Award	Result	Ref.
2025	Green Bones	Best Actor in a Leading Role ( Asia category )	Won	
2025	Green Bones	Best Actor in a Leading Role ( National category - Philippines )	Won	

=== Asian Television Awards ===
The Asian Television Awards is an appreciation to recognize and reward programming and production excellence in the Asian television industry.

Year	Recipient / Nominated work	Award	Result	Ref.
2014	My Husband's Lover	Best Actor in a Leading Role	Highly Commended	
2007	Unico Hijo	Best Actor in a Leading Role	Nominated	

=== International Golden Summit Excellence Award in Vietnam ===
Year	Recipient / Nominated work	Award	Result	Ref.
2025	Green Bones	Best Actor	Won	

=== Seoul International Drama Awards ===
Year	Recipient / Nominated work	Award	Result	Ref.
2016	My Faithful Husband	Asian Star Prize	Won	

== National Awards ==
=== The EDDYS Awards ===
Year	Recipient / Nominated work	Award	Result	Ref.
2025	Green Bones	Best Actor	Won	
2025	Himself	Box Office Hero Award	Won	

=== FAMAS Awards ===
Filipino Academy of Movie Arts and Sciences Awards are the annual honors given by an organization composed of prize-winning writers and movie columnists better known as the Filipino Academy of Movie Arts and Sciences (FAMAS), for achievements in the Philippine cinema for a calendar year. Trillo has received three awards from five nominations.

Year	Recipient / Nominated work	Award	Result	Ref.
2024	Green Bones	Best Actor	Nominated	
2016	Felix Manalo	Best Actor	Won	
2011	Rosario	Best Actor	Nominated	
2006	Mulawin: The Movie	Best Supporting Actor	Nominated	
2005	Aishite Imasu 1941: Mahal Kita	Best Supporting Actor	Won	
2005	Himself	German Moreno Youth Achievement Award	Won	

=== Gawad Parangal ng Bayaning Pilipino Awards ===
Year	Recipient / Nominated work	Award	Result	Ref.
2025	Green Bones	Best Actor	Won	

=== Gawad Pasado Awards ===
Year	Recipient / Nominated work	Award	Result	Ref.
2007	TxT	Pinakapasadong Aktor	Nominated	
2010	Astig	Pinakapasadong Aktor	Nominated	
2025	Green Bones	Pinakapasadong Aktor	Won	

=== Gawad Tanglaw ===
Academic Praisers of Motion Pictures or Gawad Tanglaw is an annual award giving body recognizing outstanding shows and films from radio, television and big screen. Trillo has received one award.

Year	Recipient / Nominated work	Award	Result	Ref.
2014	My Husband's Lover	Best Ensemble Performance (With the cast of My Husband's Lover)	Won	

=== Gawad Urian Awards ===
The Gawad Urian Awards are annual film awards in the Philippines held since 1977. It is given by the Manunuri ng Pelikulang Pilipino (the Filipino Film Critics) and is currently regarded as the counterpart of the United States' New York Film Critics Circle. Trillo has received four nominations.

Year	Recipient / Nominated work	Award	Result	Ref.
2025	Green Bones	Pinakamahusay na Pangunahing Aktor	Won	
2022	On the Job: The Missing 8	Pinakamahusay na Pangalawang Aktor	Nominated	
2016	Felix Manalo	Pinakamahusay na Pangunahing Aktor	Nominated	
2015	The Janitor	Pinakamahusay na Pangunahing Aktor	Nominated	
2006	Blue Moon	Pinakamahusay na Pangunahing Aktor	Nominated	
2005	Aishite Imasu 1941: Mahal Kita	Pinakamahusay na Pangalawang Aktor	Nominated	

=== GMMSF Guillermo Mendoza Box Office Entertainment Awards ===
Year	Recipient / Nominated work	Award	Result	Ref.
2019	One Great Love	Film Actor of the Year	Won	

=== Golden Screen Movie Awards ===
Golden Screen Awards is a yearly awards night recognizes the outstanding films in the Philippines. Trillo has received four awards from six nominations.

Year	Recipient / Nominated work	Award	Result	Ref.
2026	Himself	Dekada Awardee for Green Bones	Won	
2026	Himself	Dekada Awardee for Felix Manalo	Won	
2013	Himself	Dekada Awardee	Won	
2012	Yesterday, Today, Tomorrow	Best Performance by an Actor in a Supporting Role	Nominated	
2010	Mano Po 6: A Mother's Love	Best Performance by an Actor in a Supporting Role	Won	
2006	Blue Moon	Best Performance by an Actor in a Supporting Role	Nominated	
2005	Aishite Imasu 1941: Mahal Kita	Best Performance by an Actor in a Supporting Role	Won	
2005	Aishite Imasu 1941: Mahal Kita	Breakthrough Performance by an Actor	Won	

=== Golden Screen TV Awards ===
Created in 2004 by the Entertainment Press Society (ENPRESS), a group of entertainment writers from newspapers, Golden Screen TV Awards is a yearly awards night recognizes the outstanding programs and personalities from different TV networks in the country including ABS-CBN, TV5, GMA Network, among others. Trill has received two awards.

Year	Recipient / Nominated work	Award	Result	Ref.
2014	My Husband's Lover	Outstanding Performance by an Actor in a Drama Series	Won	
2013	Sinner or Saint	Outstanding Performance by an Actor in a Drama Series	Won	
2005	Mulawin	Best Drama Actor	Nominated	

=== Luna Award ===
The Luna Awards are awards given annually by the Film Academy of the Philippines (FAP) to recognize the outstanding achievements of the Filipino film industry. Trillo has received one award from four nominations.

Year	Recipient / Nominated work	Award	Result	Ref.
2016	Felix Manalo	Best Actor	Nominated	
2011	Rosario	Best Supporting Actor	Nominated	
2006	Blue Moon	Best Actor	Nominated	
2005	Aishite Imasu 1941: Mahal Kita	Best Actor	Won	

=== Manila Critics Circle Award ===
Year	Recipient / Nominated work	Award	Result	Ref.
2025	Green Bones	Best Actor	Won	

=== Metro Manila Film Festival ===
The Metro Manila Film Festival (MMFF) is an annual film festival which runs from December 25 (Christmas) through New Years Day and into first weekend of January in the following year, focuses on Filipino films. Trillo has received 2 awards from 4 nominations.

Year	Recipient / Nominated work	Award	Result	Ref.
2024	Green Bones	Best Actor	Won	
2018	One Great Love	Best Actor	Won	
2011	Yesterday, Today, Tomorrow	Best Supporting Actor	Nominated	
2009	Mano Po 6: A Mother's Love	Best Supporting Actor	Nominated	
2004	Aishite Imasu 1941: Mahal Kita	Best Supporting Actor	Won	

=== Philippines Arts, Film and Television Awards (PAFTA Awards) ===
Year	Recipient / Nominated work	Award	Result	Ref.
2026	Green Bones	Best Actor	Won	

=== PMPC Star Awards for Movies ===
PMPC Star Awards for Movies is annual award giving body recognizing the outstanding films produced in the Philippines every year. Trillo has received four awards from six nominations.

Year	Recipient / Nominated work	Award	Result	Ref.
2025	Green Bones	Best Actor (Tied with Aga Muhlach)	Won	
2016	Felix Manalo	Movie Actor of the Year (Tied with Piolo Pascual)	Won	
2015	The Janitor	Movie Actor of the Year	Nominated	
2014	Himself	Dekada Awardee	Won	
2012	Yesterday, Today, Tomorrow	Movie Supporting Actor of the Year	Nominated	
2010	Mano Po 6: A Mother's Love	Movie Supporting Actor of the Year	Nominated	
2005	Aishite Imasu 1941: Mahal Kita	Movie Actor of the Year	Won	
2005	Aishite Imasu 1941: Mahal Kita	New Movie Actor of the Year	Won	

=== PMPC Star Awards for TV ===
PMPC Star Awards for Television is annual award giving body recognizing the outstanding programming produced by the several TV networks in the Philippines every year. Trillo has received four nominations.

Year	Recipient / Nominated work	Award	Result	Ref.
2025	Pulang Araw	Best Drama Supporting Actor	Won	
2019	Cain at Abel	Best Drama Actor	Nominated	
2019	Magpakailanman: Patawad, Ama Ko	Best Single Performance by an Actor	Nominated	
2017	Karelasyon: Ang Pagiging Preso ni Salby	Best Single Performance by an Actor	Nominated	
2016	My Faithful Husband	Best Drama Actor	Nominated	
2013	My Husband's Lover	Best Drama Actor	Nominated	
2007	Unico Hijo	Best Single Performance by an Actor	Nominated	
2006	Now and Forever: Agos	Best Drama Actor	Nominated	

=== Society of Filipino Film Reviewers ===
Year	Recipient / Nominated work	Award	Result	Ref.
2022	On the Job: The Missing 8	Best Ensemble Performance - Penoy Review Award	Won	

=== Young Critics Circle ===
The Young Critics Circle is composed of members of the Philippine academe who, through the years, have become attentive observers of Philippine cinema. Trillo has received one award.

Year	Recipient / Nominated work	Award	Result	Ref.
2005	Aishite Imasu 1941: Mahal Kita	Best Performance by Male or Female, Adult or Child, Individual or Ensemble in Leading or Supporting Role	Won	

== Industry Awards ==
=== PEP List Awards ===
The PEP List yearly honors the showbiz personalities, TV shows, and movies that made a great impact. It is divided into two categories, Editors’ Choice and PEPsters’ Choice, with several sub-categories. The winners under the Editors’ Choice categories will be chosen by the editors and staff of PEP. On the other hand, the winners in the PEPsters’ Choice categories will be decided upon by PEP users through a poll. Trillo has received one award from two nominations.

Year	Recipient / Nominated work	Award	Result	Ref.
2015	Hiram na Alaala	Teleserye Actor of the Year (Editors' Choice)	Nominated	
2014	My Husband's Lover	Celebrity Pair of the Year (with Tom Rodriguez) (PEPsters' Choice)	Won	
