= Gabby Padilla =

Filipino actress and thespian

- Occupation: Actress
- Years active: 2017–present

Gabby Padilla is a Filipino film and theater actress. She is known for her performances in acclaimed films such as Billie and Emma (2018), Gitling (2023), and Kono Basho (2024).

Padilla was the recipient of the Best Actress award at the 2024 Cinemalaya Independent Film Festival. She has since been noted for her continued work in the Philippine independent film scene.

== Early life ==
Padilla was raised in Iloilo City. She had limited exposure to musicals growing up, but developed a strong interest in the performing arts after her father introduced her to Broadway productions. During the COVID-19 pandemic, she relocated to Manila to pursue higher education. She enrolled at Assumption College San Lorenzo, where she majored in Theater Arts and Media Education.

== Career ==
In 2018, Padilla portrayed honor student Emma in the QCinema International Film Festival coming-of-age film, Billie and Emma. Padilla, who identifies as straight, said she was initially concerned about portraying Emma, aware that someone queer could have been cast. She noted that the director was flexible about orientation because the character's story focuses on her personal growth and challenges as a young woman in the early 1990s, with romance being only part of the narrative. Padilla was nominated Best Actress at the 67th FAMAS Awards for her performance.

Padilla portrayed Jamie, a Filipina translator, in the 2023 Cinemalaya film Gitling. BLNC Magazine identified the film as a standout in her career for showcasing a different aspect of her acting abilities. The film's director, Jopy Arnaldo, shared in an interview that he had tailored the script specifically with Padilla in mind, noting that "if she did not say yes, I would not have known what to do" (original: "Kung hindi sya nag yes, hindi ko alam gagawin ko"). For the role, Padilla studied Japanese for seven months. Her performance earned her a Gawad Urian Award nomination for Best Actress.

Padilla returned to Cinemalaya the following year with the film Kono Basho, in which she portrayed Ella, a Filipina anthropologist. She stated that the film “hit close to home” because she lost her own father years earlier. Director Jaime Pacena II stated that, of all the actresses who could play Ella, Padilla was “there to save us … to be our Ella.” For her performance, Padilla received the Best Actress award at that year's Cinemalaya.

== Artistry ==
Padilla has stated that she considers both the quality of the material and the team behind a project before accepting a role, emphasizing the importance of working with collaborators who share her values and vision. Padilla has described navigating emotionally intense roles as requiring both vulnerability and support. She stated that the lines between her personal experience and her character [in Kono Basho] often “get blurred—especially in the process,” and emphasized the importance of working with a trusted team to sustain her performance while protecting herself. In discussing her craft, Padilla has expressed appreciation for creating characters inspired by different people, which she says helps humanize the roles.

== Filmography ==
=== Film ===
Key
†	Denotes films or TV productions that have not yet been released

Year	Title	Role	Notes	Ref.
2015	Dahling Nick	Agueda	Cinema One Originals Festival entry	
2016	Sin-o ang Tiktik	Dina		
2018	Ang Babaeng Allergic sa Wifi	Olive	Guest Role	
2018	Juan Balucas at ang Bayabas	Reyna Suki		
2018	Goyo: Ang Batang Heneral	Dolores Nable Jose		
2018	Billie and Emma	Emma	QCinema International Film Festival entry	
2018	Eerie	Joyce		
2019	Alone/Together	Alex		
2019	Cara x Jagger	Yani		
2019	Dead Kids	Yssa Miranda		
2019	Kalel, 15	Sue	Tallinn Black Nights Film Festival entry	
2020	Cats and Dogs		QCinema's QC Short Shorts entry	
2022	Ngayon Kaya	Nina		
2023	Marupok AF	Dina Fontarum		
2023	Gitling	Jamie Lazaro	19th Cinemalaya Independent Film Festival entry	
2023	A Very Good Girl	Claire		
2024	Kono Basho	Ella	Cinemalaya Independent Film Festival entry	
2024	Uninvited	Lilia "Lily" Capistrano	50th Metro Manila Film Festival entry	
2025	Tigkiliwi	Marlin	CinePanalo Film Festival entry	
2025	When It Rained Malunggay Leaves	Ariel	Sine Kabataan film entry; short film	
TBA	Love & Lockdown †	Valeria	Post-production	

=== Television ===
Year	Title	Role	Notes	Ref.
2016–17	Sabagay Life	Timi	Mini series	
2017	Brilliante Mendoza Presents: Pagtatapos	Shaira Torres	Episode 3	
2021	Still	Debbie	Episodes 1-4	
2022–23	K-Love	Frances		
2023	The Rain in España	Amethyst		
2023	Replacing Chef Chico	Britanny	Guest Role	
2024	Secret Ingredient	Stella		
2025	Beauty Empire	Helena Alfonso		
2026	Drug War: A Conspiracy of Silence †	TBA	Post-production	
2026	The Good Doctor †	TBA	Philippine adaptation	

=== Music videos ===
Year	Title	Artist	Ref.
2022	"Tayuman"	Kean Cipriano	

== Theater ==
Year	Production	Role	Location	Ref.
2016	A Little Princess	Lavinia	Repertory Philippines	
2017	Matilda	Ensemble	Meralco Theater	
2019	Beautiful: The Carole King Musical	Ensemble	Meralco Theater	
2024	Tiny Beautiful Things	Letter writer	Power Mac Center Spotlight	
2024	I Love You, You're Perfect, Now Change	Various roles (Note: Padilla plays over 10 different characters in this production.)	Repertory Philippines	
2026	Sole Survivor	Nina	Rep Theater	
2026	People, Places, and Things	Emma (Note: Alternates role with Bella Padilla.)	The Blackbox at the Proscenium Theater	
2027	Ang Tahanan ni Bernarda Alba	Adela	Power Mac Center Spotlight	

== Accolades ==
Awards and NominationsAwards and nominations received by Gabby Padilla
Award	Year	Category	Nominated work	Result	Ref.
Aliw Awards	2024	Best Lead Actress in a Musical	I Love You, You're Perfect, Now Change	Nominated	
Cinemalaya Independent Film Festival	2024	Best Actress	Kono Basho	Won (Note: Tied with Marian Rivera for Balota.)	
CinePanalo Film Festival	2025	Panalong Pangalawang Aktres (Best Supporting Actress)	Tigkiliwi	Won	
FAMAS Award	2019	Outstanding Performance by an Actress in a Leading Role	Billie and Emma	Nominated	
Gawad Buhay Awards	2025	Female Featured Performance in a Play	Tiny Beautiful Things	Nominated	
Gawad Buhay Awards	2025	Female Lead Performance in a Musical	I Love You, You’re Perfect, Now Change	Nominated	
Gawad Urian Awards	2024	Best Actress (Pinakamahusay na Pangunahing Aktres)	Gitling	Nominated	
Gawad Urian Awards	2025	Best Actress (Pinakamahusay na Pangunahing Aktres)	Kono Basho	Nominated	
Metro Manila Film Festival	2024	Best Supporting Actress	Uninvited	Nominated	
Philippine Arts, Film and Television Awards	2026	Best Supporting Actress	Uninvited	Won	
PMPC Star Awards for Movies	2019	New Movie Actress of the Year	Billie and Emma	Nominated	
