= 2018 Metro Manila Film Festival =

2018 film festival edition

2018 Metro Manila Film Festival 44th Metro Manila Film Festival
- Awards: Gabi ng Parangal (transl. Awards Night)
- No. of films: 8
- Festival date: December 25, 2018 to January 7, 2019

MMFF chronology
- 45th ed. 43rd ed.

The 2018 Metro Manila Film Festival (MMFF) is the 44th edition of the annual Metro Manila Film Festival held in Metro Manila and throughout the Philippines. It is organized by the Metropolitan Manila Development Authority (MMDA). During the festival, no foreign films are shown in Philippine theaters (except IMAX and 4D theaters).

== Entries ==
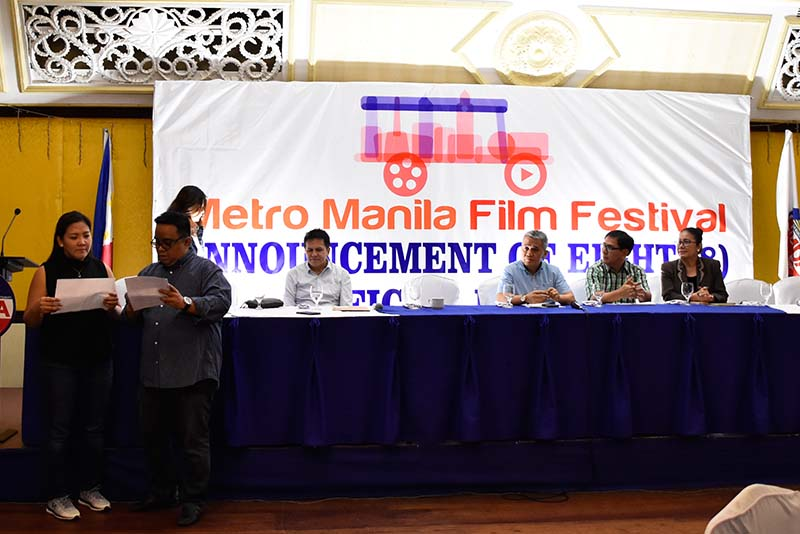
Announcement of the final eight films which featured in the 2018 MMFF. October 9, 2018.

=== Feature films ===
The Metro Manila Film Festival (MMFF) Executive Committee announced four of the eight official entries in June 2018. The first four films were selected based from the script submission. On October 9, the last four films were announced by the MMFF Selection Committee headed by National Artist for Literature, Bienvenido Lumbera. They are all finished films.

Title	Starring	Production company	Director	Genre
First batch
Aurora	Anne Curtis	Viva Films, Aliud Entertainment	Yam Laranas	Horror, Thriller, Suspense
Fantastica	Vice Ganda, Richard Gutierrez, Dingdong Dantes	Star Cinema, Viva Films	Barry Gonzales	Fantasy, Comedy
The Girl in the Orange Dress	Jericho Rosales, Jessy Mendiola	Star Cinema, Quantum Films, MJM Production	Jay Abello	Romance, Comedy
Jack Em Popoy: The Puliscredibles	Coco Martin, Maine Mendoza, Vic Sotto	CCM Film Productions, APT Entertainment, M-Zet Productions	Mike Tuviera	Action, Thriller, Comedy
Second batch
Mary, Marry Me	Toni Gonzaga, Alex Gonzaga, Sam Milby	TEN17P, TINCAN	RC delos Reyes	Romantic comedy
One Great Love	Dennis Trillo, Kim Chiu, JC de Vera	Regal Entertainment	Eric Quizon	Romance, Drama
Otlum	Ricci Rivero, Jerome Ponce	Horseshoe Productions	Joven Tan	Horror
Rainbow's Sunset	Eddie Garcia, Tony Mabesa, Gloria Romero, Sunshine Dizon	Heaven's Best Entertainment	Joel Lamangan	Family drama

=== Short films ===
A short film competition for students was organized as part of the film festival. A total of 123 entries were submitted with eight of them selected as finalists. The eight selected short films were screened alongside the official eight full-length films during the whole official run of the film festival.

Title	Director	School
Balita (transl. News)	Harold Joshua Singzon	Centro Escolar University
Binibini 14. Beverly Lagdameo (transl. Miss 14. Beverly Lagdameo)	Neil Adrien Reyes	De La Salle – College of St. Benilde
Dalawampung Pisong Pag-asa (transl. Twenty Pesos Hope)	Pauleen Valdez	St. Dominic College of Asia
Kasilyas (transl. Restroom)	Leslie Ann Ramirez	Bulacan State University
Padyak (transl. Stomp)	Venice Awitin	Northern Mindanao Colleges
Paraiso (transl. Paradise)	Carlo Lopez	University of the Philippines Diliman
Tahanan (transl. Home)	Demetrio Celestino III	Catanduanes State University
Sasagot Ka Pa? (transl. Will You Answer Back)	Ronald Van Angelo Dulatre	De La Salle – College of St. Benilde

== Parade of Stars ==
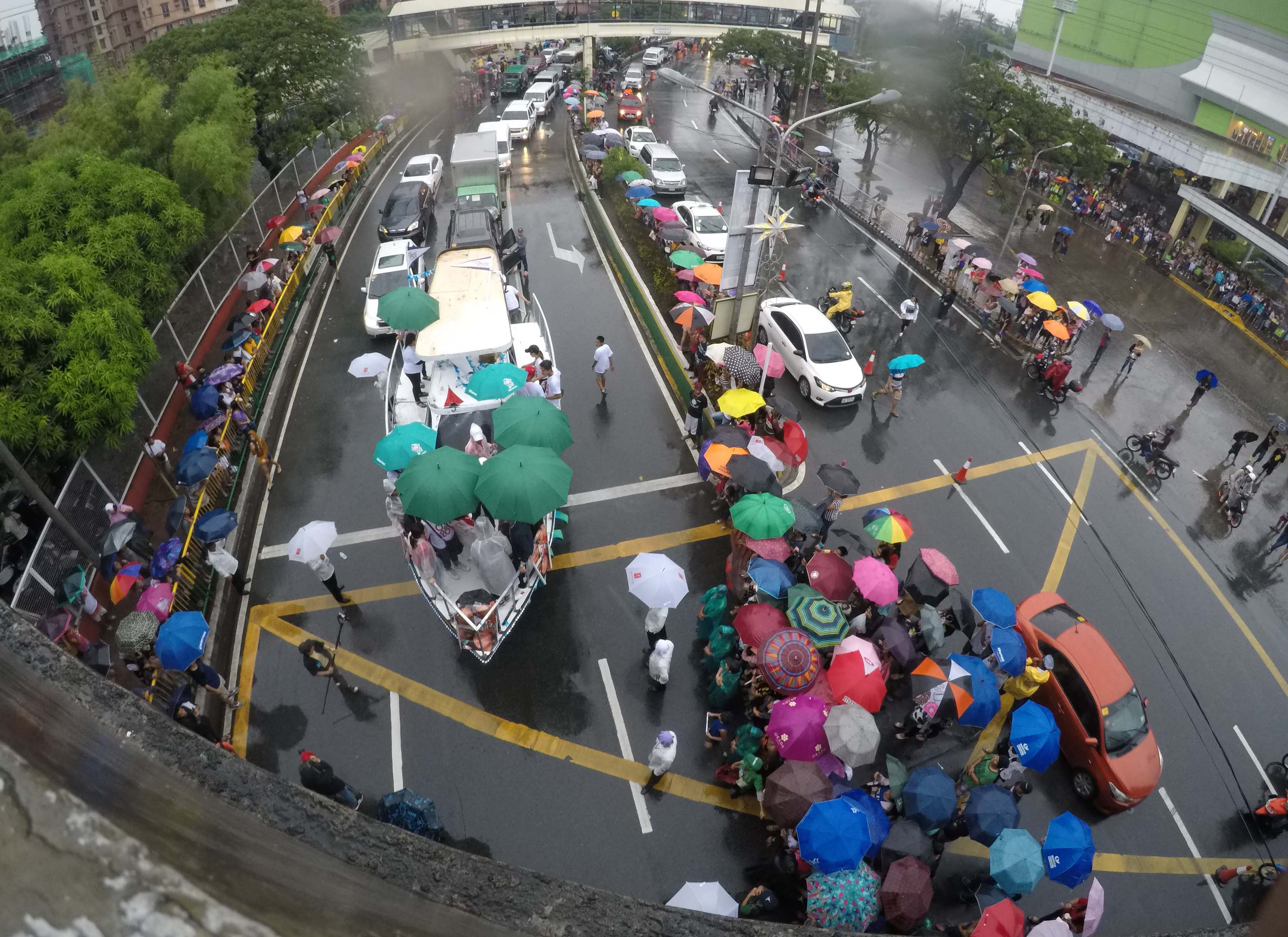
The Parade of Stars of the 2018 MMFF.

Parañaque was selected as the host city of the launch of the metropolis-wide film festival in March 2018 by the MMFF Executive Committee. The hosting coincides with the 20th anniversary of Parañaque's conversion into a city.

The traditional Parade of Stars which featured floats of the film festival's eight entries took place in Parañaque on December 23, 2018 and was planned to traverse a route measuring 12.3 km (7.6 mi). The parade began near Shopwise Santana Grove in Parañaque, where an estimated crowd of 300,000 waited for the start of the event, and ended on Bradco Avenue. The parade route also included Dr. Santos Avenue, V. Medina Avenue, Quirino Avenue, NAIA Road, and Macapagal Boulevard. The Parañaque Traffic and Parking Management Office closed a significant portion of Dr. A. Santos Avenue starting from Sta. Rita Avenue from vehicular traffic beginning of noon of the day of the parade with assembly and preparation of the event scheduled to begin at 1pm. The normally eastbound lanes of Dr. A. Santos Avenue from Soreena to Kabihasnan, eastbound lanes of NAIA Road from Quirino Avenue to Macapagal Boulevard, and southbound lanes of Macapagal Boulevard from NAIA Road to Bradco Avenue were also temporarily opened for counterflow in an effort to manage anticipated heavy traffic situation caused by the parade.

Heavy rain disrupted the parade program causing delays with the floats stuck in mud at the starting point of the parade. Besides the float of the eight featured films of the MMFF, the parade was supposed to be joined by the floats of the Parañaque local government and Metropolitan Manila Development Authority but their vehicles were not reportedly present in the starting area. The float, featuring the film Fantastica, was the first float to leave the assembly area at 1:25 pm albeit without members of its cast. The Fantastica cast boarded their film's float vehicle an hour later. The Girl in the Orange Dress float followed Fantastica's float with Jericho Rosales and Jessy Mendiola. By 3:30 pm, only three out of eight floats has managed to get out of the mud with One Great Love joining the vehicles of Fantastica and Girl in the Orange Dress. The float of Mary, Marry Me was the fourth and final vehicle able to join the parade.

The Jack Em Popoy cast opted to leave their float behind and boarded a truck instead. The cast of Otlum and Rainbow’s Sunset also did the same and boarded another vehicle while the cast of Aurora left their float but Anne Curtis is using her own van to head straight to Aseana where the parade ended.

At least two million were estimated to have witnessed the event live.

== Awards ==
2018 Metro Manila Film Festival Gabi ng Parangal
- Date: December 27, 2018
- Site: The Theatre at Solaire, Parañaque
- Hosted by: Janno Gibbs, Mark Bautista, and Nina Dolino

Highlights
- Best Picture: Rainbow's Sunset
- Best Director: Joel Lamangan; Rainbow's Sunset
- Best Actor: Dennis Trillo; One Great Love
- Best Actress: Gloria Romero; Rainbow's Sunset
- Most awards: Rainbow's Sunset (11)

Television coverage
- Network: ABS-CBN

The Gabi ng Parangal (transl. Awards Night) of the 2018 Metro Manila Film Festival was held at The Theatre at Solaire in Parañaque on December 27, 2018. The awards night was hosted by Janno Gibbs, Mark Bautista, and Niña Dolino.

Christopher de Leon, Gina Alajar and Joanna Ampil are the new members of the MMFF jury for the 2018 edition of the film festival.

=== Major awards ===
Winners are listed first, highlighted in boldface, and indicated with a double dagger (‡). Nominations are also listed if applicable.

Best Picture	Best Director
**Rainbow's Sunset – Heaven's Best Entertainment**‡; Aurora – Viva Films, Aliud Entertainment (2nd Best Picture); One Great Love – Regal Entertainment (3rd Best Picture)	**Joel Lamangan – Rainbow's Sunset**‡; Yam Laranas – Aurora; Enrico Quizon – One Great Love
Best Actor	Best Actress
**Dennis Trillo – One Great Love**‡; Eddie Garcia – Rainbow's Sunset; Jericho Rosales – The Girl in the Orange Dress	**Gloria Romero – Rainbow's Sunset**‡; Kim Chiu – One Great Love; Anne Curtis – Aurora
Best Supporting Actor	Best Supporting Actress
**Tony Mabesa – Rainbow's Sunset**‡; Tirso Cruz III – Rainbow's Sunset; JC De Vera – One Great Love	**Aiko Melendez – Rainbow's Sunset**‡; Sunshine Dizon – Rainbow's Sunset; Miles Ocampo – One Great Love
Best Child Performer	Best Screenplay
**Phoebe Villamor – Aurora**‡; Lauren Madelaine Cabugas – One Great Love; Yñigo Delen – Otlum	**Eric Ramos – Rainbow's Sunset**‡; Gin De Mesa and Yam Laranas – Aurora; Gina Marissa Tagasa – One Great Love
Best Cinematography	Best Production Design
**Yam Laranas – Aurora**‡; Rain Yamson II – Rainbow's Sunset; Mo Zee – One Great Love	**Jay Custodio – Rainbow's Sunset**‡; Winston Acuyong – Fantastica; Ericson Navarro and Daniel Red – Aurora
Best Editing	Best Sound
**Tara Illenberger and Renewin Alano – Jack Em Popoy:** **The Puliscredibles**‡; Mai Calapardo – Rainbow's Sunset; Rico Testa and Yam Laranas – Aurora	**Albert Michael Idioma – Aurora**‡; Lamberto Casas, Jr. – One Great Love; Albert Michael Idioma and Alex Tomboc – Rainbow's Sunset
Best Original Theme Song	Best Musical Score
**"Sa'yo Na" from Rainbow's Sunset – Ice Seguerra**‡; "Sissums" from Mary, Marry Me – Alex Gonzaga and Toni Gonzaga; "Dating Tayo" from One Great Love – TJ Monterde	**Miguel Mendoza – One Great Love**‡; Oscar Fogelström – Aurora; Emerzon Texon – Rainbow's Sunset
Best Visual Effects	Best Float
**Ernest Villanueva and Gem Garcia – Aurora**‡; Mothership – Fantastica; Ralph Soriano – Otlum	**Jack Em Popoy: The Puliscredibles**‡
Gatpuno Antonio J. Villegas Cultural Award	Fernando Poe Jr. Memorial Award for Excellence
**Rainbow's Sunset**‡	**Jack Em Popoy: The Puliscredibles**‡
Special Jury Prize	
**Max Collins – Rainbow's Sunset**‡; **Eddie Garcia – Rainbow's Sunset**‡

==== Other awards ====
- Male Star of the Night – **Jericho Rosales**
- Female Star of the Night – **Anne Curtis**

=== Short Film category ===
- Best Student Short Film – **Kasilyas** of **Bulsu Cinephilia, Bulacan State University**

== Multiple awards ==
Awards	Film
11	Rainbow's Sunset
5	Aurora
3	Jack Em Popoy: The Puliscredibles
3	One Great Love

== Box office gross ==
On January 8, 2019, a day after the official run of the 2018 MMFF concluded, the Metro Manila Development Authority announced that 2018 MMFF recorded the highest ever box office gross in the whole history of the film festival earning a total ₱1.060 billion. The previous record was held by the 2015 Metro Manila Film Festival which earned ₱10 million less than the 2018 edition. On January 10, 2019 it was announced that the top four grossing films (in no particular order) were: Aurora, Fantastica, Jack Em Popoy, and Mary, Marry Me. By that time only Aurora has publicly released its earnings. According to Cinema Bravo, Aurora grossed ₱107 million

Preceded by 2017 Metro Manila Film Festival	Metro Manila Film Festival; 2018	Succeeded by 2019 Metro Manila Film Festival
