= K-Love (Philippine TV series) =

2022 Philippine drama television series

- Official Poster
- Genre: Romantic comedy
- Written by: Corinna Vistan; Tara Sering; Tweet Sering
- Directed by: Bobby Yan; John Paul Su; Ian S. Takahashi; Corinna Vistan
- Starring: Iza Calzado; Isabella Daza; Sue Ramirez; Gabby Padilla; Jake Cuenca
- Country of origin: Philippines
- Original languages: English, Tagalog
- No. of episodes: 18

Production
- Executive producers: Joji Alonso; Lea Dizon; Patricia Sumagui; Katherine Visconti
- Cinematography: Ian S. Takahashi
- Editors: John Paul Ponce; Manet A. Dayrit
- Production companies: Viu; Q Plus Productions

Original release
- Release: October 14, 2022 – February 13, 2023

K-Love is a Philippine romantic comedy television series created by Corinna Vistan and directed by Bobby Yan. The show premiered on Viu on October 14, 2022, as a Viu Original series. It stars Iza Calzado, Isabelle Daza, Sue Ramirez, Gabby Padilla, and Jake Cuenca.

The series is inspired by the "anatomy of K-dramas," which highlights three guiding principles that define the genre: (1) love conquers all, (2) fantasy comes to life, and (3) escape from reality.

== Synopsis ==
The series follows five Filipino K-drama enthusiasts who draw inspiration from the dramas they watch. The five main characters—Tish, Jay, Shiela, Val, and Frances—are friends from different walks of life. They are brought together by their shared passion for K-dramas, even as they navigate the various risks and challenges in their personal lives.

== Cast and characters ==
=== Main characters ===
- Iza Calzado as Patricia San Juan ("Tish")
- Isabelle Daza as Shiela Cassandra Aragonna ("Shiela")
- Sue Ramirez as Valentina Dizon ("Val")
- Gabby Padilla as Frances Orteras ("Fran")
- Jake Cuenca as Marcus Aurelius Narcisco ("Jay")

=== Supporting Characters ===
- Guji Lorenzana as David (Sheila's husband)
- Jojit Lorenzo as Antonio (Val's business partner)
- Afi Africa as Kimmy
- RK Bagatsing as Calvin
- Markus Paterson as Pedro
- Raul Morit as Mang Ben

== Production ==
Series creator Corinna Vistan previously worked as a Marvel Studios executive, contributing to 19 Marvel films as of 2022. Vistan's work on Guardians of the Galaxy Vol. 2 received a Gold Clio Award, while Doctor Strange and Thor: Ragnarok earned Silver Telly Awards in 2016 and 2017, respectively.

Series director Bobby Yan has received multiple accolades throughout his career, including seven Emmy Awards for his work as a producer and editor on the MLB Network. He also participated in the ABC Disney Directing Fellowship and has worked on a variety of television shows, including Agents of S.H.I.E.L.D., Showtime's The Chi, and The Politician. Yan's recent independent film, Marz, was featured in film festivals worldwide, including Sundance, Toronto, London, and Palm Springs.

Series cinematographer Ian S. Takahashi has worked on both films and music videos. He was recognised with a Clio Award for Best Cinematography for a Kaiser Permanente advertisement featuring NBA star Stephen Curry.

The production team also includes several accomplished individuals. Tara Sering, former Editor-in-Chief at Summit Publications, is known for her contributions to contemporary women's fiction and her successful book sales in the Philippines. Tweet Sering, a best-selling author, received recognition from the Manila Critics Circle for her novel Wander Girl and was honoured with the Carlos Palanca Memorial Awards for Literature, one of the country's most prestigious literary distinctions. Lea Dizon, a script development executive, previously worked at Walt Disney Studios and contributed to the children's animated series Valt the Wonder Deer, which aired for multiple seasons in both the United States and China. Katherine Visconti, known for her work on series such as Designated Survivor, FBI, and Chicago P.D., also contributed her writing expertise to the production. Wardrobe duties are overseen by fashion stylist and current Vogue Philippines fashion editor Pam Quiñones.
