= Aurora (2018 Filipino film) =

2018 film by Yam Laranas

- Theatrical release poster
- Directed by: Yam Laranas
- Screenplay by: Yam Laranas; Gin de Mesa
- Story by: Gin de Mesa
- Produced by: Vic del Rosario Jr.; Vincent Paolo Fernandez
- Starring: Anne Curtis
- Cinematography: Yam Laranas
- Edited by: Yam Laranas; Rico Testa
- Music by: Oscar Fogelström
- Production companies: Viva Films; Aliud Entertainment
- Distributed by: Viva Films
- Release dates: December 25, 2018 (44th Metro Manila Film Festival); April 16, 2019 (BRIFF)
- Running time: 99–110 minutes
- Country: Philippines
- Language: Filipino
- Budget: ₱3 million
- Box office: ₱107 million

Aurora is a 2018 Philippine horror thriller film written and directed by Yam Laranas and starring Anne Curtis. It serves as an official entry to the 2018 Metro Manila Film Festival and marks Curtis' third and last film of 2018, following her box-office hits Sid & Aya: Not a Love Story and BuyBust. The film is inspired by the 1987 disaster of MV Doña Paz's collision with MT Vector.

== Premise ==
The story follows Leana (Curtis) who lives peacefully in the island with her younger sister Rita. Everything changes when a ship named Aurora crashes near their vicinity. Rita has an ability to see dead people, but every time she sees them, disastrous and catastrophic events occur. Leana must then protect the young girl at any cost before it is too late.

== Cast ==
- Anne Curtis as Leana
- Marco Gumabao as Ricky
- Mercedes Cabral as Delia
- Allan Paule as Eddie
- Andrea Del Rosario as Cecile
- Phoebe Villamor as Rita
- Arnold Reyes as Philip
- Ricardo Cepeda as Coast Guard
- Ruby Ruiz as Mrs. Castro
- Sue Prado as Mrs. Amado
