= Yayo Aguila =

Filipina actress

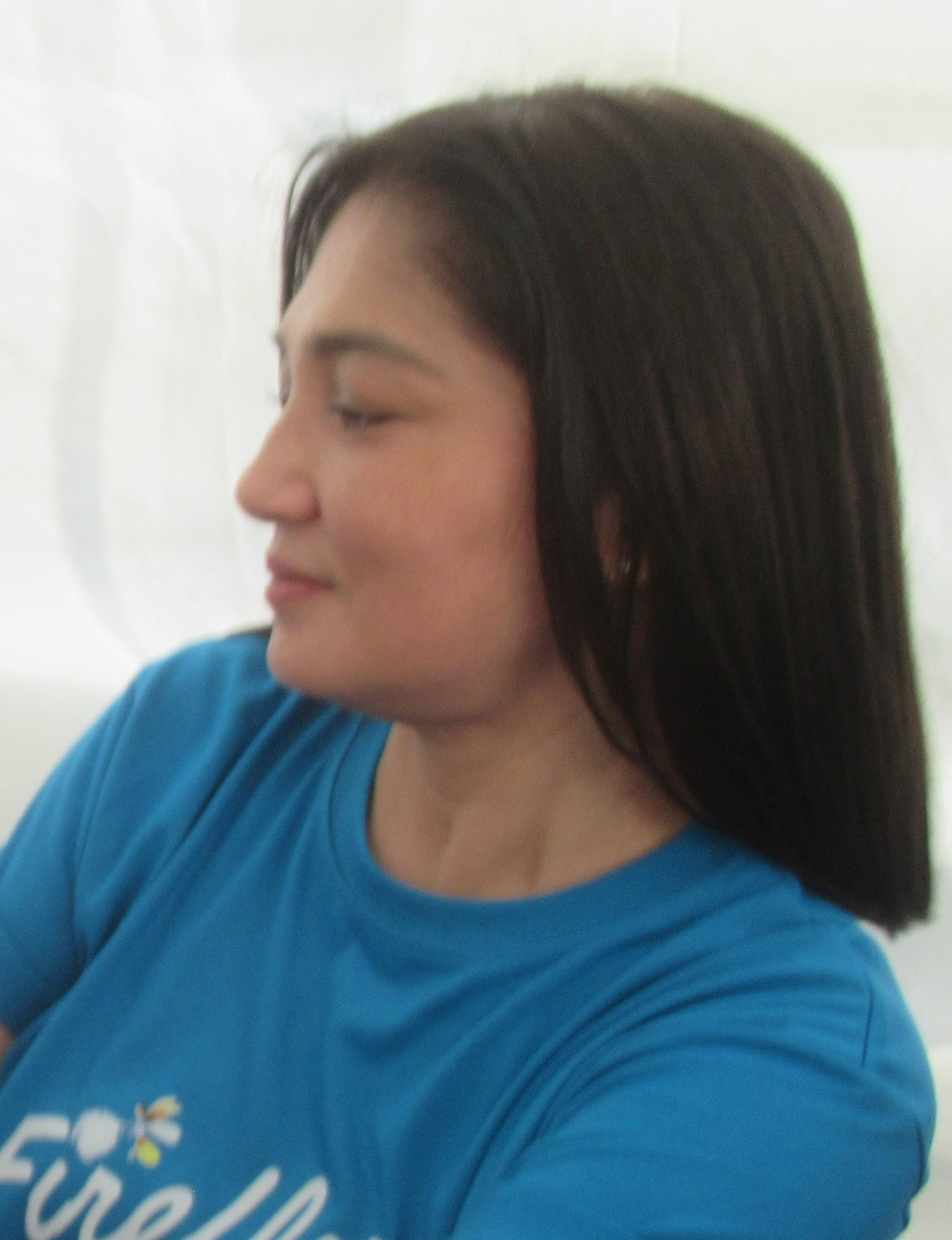
- Born: Maria Rosario Racelis Aguila; September 13, 1967 (age 59); Manila, Philippines
- Other name: Yayo Aguila Martinez
- Occupation: Actress
- Years active: 1982–present
- Spouse: William Martinez (m. 1985; sep. 2010)

Maria Rosario "Yayo" Racelis Aguila (September 13, 1967) is a Filipino actress whose career began through the film series Bagets.

== Career ==
Yayo Aguila's career began in 1982. Her breakout film was the cult film Bagets, which was about a group of high school teenagers, playing the role of Rose. Despite her success, she would end up in a hiatus after marrying her co-star, William Martinez. She began her comeback with the film Kay Tagal Kang Hinintay in 1998. Yayo Aguila would later follow this project by starring in the television series Gimik and G-mik!, which is also teen-oriented.

Yayo Aguila was part of the second season of the celebrity edition of Pinoy Big Brother. She voluntary exited on Day 71. She is currently seen on ABS-CBN.

== Personal life ==
During the filming of her first project, Bagets, Yayo Aguila met her future husband, actor William Martinez. They separated in 2010 after 25 years of marriage.

One of Yayo Aguila's housemates in Pinoy Big Brother was actor Baron Geisler who was involved in a court case filed by her daughter after the reality show ended. Her daughter accused Geisler of acts of lasciviousness. He fought back by filing a perjury case against Yayo Aguila and her daughter.

== Filmography ==
=== Film ===
Year	Title	Role
1984	Bagets	Rose
1986	Working Boys	Cookie
1998	Kay Tagal Kang Hinintay	Letty
2004	Bcuz of U	Cara's mother
2006	Umaaraw, Umuulan	Yolly, Movie Executive
2009	Villa Estrella	Anna's mother
2011	Tween Academy: Class of 2012	Myla
2011	Yesterday, Today, Tomorrow	Woman Flirting Derek
2012	The Reunion	Carmen Alvarez
2013	Seduction	Dolor
2013	Badil	
2014	Starting Over Again	Ginny's mother
2014	Overtime	Jody's mother
2014	She's Dating the Gangster	older Grace
2014	ABCs of Death 2	Carmela
2015	Halik sa Hangin	Inang
2015	Just the Way You Are	Veronica/Tita V
2015	Honor Thy Father	Jessica
2015	Etiquette for Mistresses	Marla
2016	Imagine You and Me	Merced Malinao
2016	Bakit Lahat ng Gwapo may Boyfriend?	Dina
2017	Finally Found Someone	Maybelyn Esguerra
2017	Kiko Boksingero	Diday
2017	Unexpectedly Yours	Lulu
2017	All of You	
2018	Never Not Love You	Joanne's mother
2018	The Lookout	
2018	All Souls Night	
2018	Class of 2018	Selina
2018	Mary, Marry Me	Beth Lagman
2019	Between Maybes	Myra
2019	The Last Interview: The Mayor Antonio "Thony" Halili Story	
2019	Indak	
2019	Unforgettable	Nanette
2019	Metamorphosis	Elena
2019	Miracle in Cell No. 7	Cathy San Juan
2020	Block Z	PJ's mom
2020	Suarez: The Healing Priest	
2022	May-December-January	Migoy's mother
2023	Kunwari... Mahal Kita	
2023	The Cheating Game	Faith Celestial
2023	Firefly	Carmen Alcantara
2024	My Sassy Girl	
2024	40	
2025	Isolated	Teresa
2025	100 Awit para kay Stella	Sandra
2026	A Special Memory	

=== Television ===
Year	Title	Role
1982	Okay Sha	Recurring role
1999–2002	G-mik	Recurring role
2001	Maynila	Recurring role
2001	Sa Dulo ng Walang Hanggan	Esther
2004	Maalaala Mo Kaya: Scrapbook	Kim Park
2005	Love to Love Presents: Wish Upon a Jar	Recurring Role
2005	Ang Mahiwagang Baul: Si Juanito at ang Duwende	Maring
2005	Sugo	Anita
2006	I Luv NY	Susan Santos
2006	Komiks Presents: Da Adventures of Pedro Penduko	Kafra
2006	Love Spell Presents: Home Switch Home	Recurring Role
2006	Daisy Siete: Moshi Moshi Chikiyaki	Lydia
2007	Pinoy Big Brother: Celebrity Edition 2	Herself/Housemate
2007	Maalaala Mo Kaya: Feeding Bottle	Recurring Roler
2007	Mga Mata ni Anghelita	Beth
2007	Magic Kamison	Rianne
2008	Kung Fu Kids	Mrs. Ocampo
2008	ASAP	Herself
2008	Maalaala Mo Kaya: Leather Shoes	Recurring Role
2008	Maalaala Mo Kaya: Mansyon	Delia
2009	Maalaala Mo Kaya: Soccer Ball	Self
2009	Moomoo and Me	Rose Magpantay
2009	Sine Novela: Ngayon at Kailanman	Melissa Noche
2009	Nasaan Ka Maruja?	Precy Miranda
2009	Precious Hearts Romances Presents: Somewhere in My Heart	Michelle Dalisay
2010	Maalaala Mo Kaya: Kalapati	Viel
2010	Maalaala Mo Kaya: Makinilya	Pinky
2010	Maalaala Mo Kaya: Piano	
2010	Melason	Herself
2010	Precious Hearts Romances Presents: Impostor	Lira Aguilar-Ventura
2010	My Driver Sweet Lover	Yaya Auring
2010	Wansapanataym: Valentina	Susan
2011	Wansapanataym: Family Tree	Lita Sandoval
2011	Your Song Presents: Andi	Elsa
2011	Wansapanataym Presents: Rod Santiago's: Buhawi Jack	Josie Isidro
2011	Maalaala Mo Kaya: Tropeo	Cering
2011	Minsan Lang Kita Iibigin	
2011	Good Vibes	Amanda Pedroza
2011	100 Days to Heaven	Teresita Delgado
2011	Maalaala Mo Kaya: Kape	Tess
2011	Wansapanataym: RR Marcelino's Darmo Adarna	Claring
2011	Nasaan Ka, Elisa?	Adriana Valdez
2011	Wansapanataym: Happy Neo Year	
2012	Ikaw ay Pag-Ibig	Marietta
2012	Maalaala Mo Kaya: Panyo	
2012	Princess and I	Des Salamat
2012	Wansapanataym: Kuha Mo	Patty
2012	Maalaala Mo Kaya: Marriage Contract	Fely
2013	Wansapanataym: Gagam-Buboy	Annie
2013	Little Champ	Dahlia
2013	Apoy sa Dagat	Dolores Manubat
2013	Wansapanataym: Mommy Nappers	Agnes Sandoval
2013	Maalaala Mo Kaya: Box	Mama
2013	My Little Juan	Betchay
2013	Kahit Nasaan Ka Man	Medel
2014	The Borrowed Wife	Imelda Beltran
2014	Magpakailanman: Gas Mo Bukas Ko	
2014	Panalangin	Rachelle
2014	Sana Bukas pa ang Kahapon	Young Ruth Gaspar
2014	Ipaglaban Mo: Amin ang Pamana Mo	Aling Marta
2014	More Than Words	Marissa Santillian
2015	Forevermore	Taps
2015	FlordeLiza	Dahlia Cruz-Dizon
2015	Ipaglaban Mo: Ang Bintang Mo sa Akin	Teresa
2015	Pasión de Amor	Leonora Alvarez-Samonte
2015	Pinoy Big Brother: 737	Houseguest
2015	My Fair Lady	Susan
2015	FPJ's Ang Probinsyano	Marita de Vela
2016	Be My Lady	Elsa Soliman
2016	Magpakailanman: Multo ni Ella	Nita
2016	Magpakailanman: Rape ni Rosie	Sonya
2016	Usapang Real Love	Gina Cablao
2017	Maalaala Mo Kaya: Cellphone	Emilia
2017	Tadhana: 143 NZ	Helen
2017	Wagas: Sumpa	Gloria
2017	Ipaglaban Mo: Pikot	Chona
2017	G.R.I.N.D. Get Ready It's a New Day	Heidi Katacutan
2017	Tadhana: Sundo	Ofelia
2017	Maalaala Mo Kaya: Tulay	Lucing
2018	Maalaala Mo Kaya: Mangga	Amparo
2018	Ipaglaban Mo: Pangalan	Tess Hermosa
2018	Wansapanataym: Ikaw ang Ghosto Ko	Lovely
2018	Playhouse	Cathy
2018	Ngayon at Kailanman	Sonia
2019	Maalaala Mo Kaya: MVP	Alona
2020	Ate ng Ate Ko	Mithi Gonzales
2021	Maalaala Mo Kaya: Tattoo	Maya Bonifacio
2021	Encounter: The Philippine Adaptation	Marilyn Hilario
2021	Niña Niño	Yasmin
2023	Underage	Rebecca "Becca" Serrano
2023	Team A	Violeta Bagsic
2024	Black Rider	Hilda Magallanes
2024	Padyak Princess	Selma Nieva
2025	Ang Mutya ng Section E	Gemma Fernandez
2025	Bad Genius	Nona
