= Mary, Marry Me =

- Theatrical release poster
- Directed by: RC delos Reyes
- Produced by: Paul David Soriano; Mark Victor; Celestine Gonzaga-Soriano; Catherine Gonzaga
- Starring: Toni Gonzaga; Alex Gonzaga; Sam Milby
- Cinematography: Tey Clamor; Yves Jamero
- Edited by: Mark Cyril Bautista; Noah Tonga
- Music by: Len Calvo
- Production companies: TEN17P; TINCAN
- Distributed by: Solar Pictures
- Release date: December 25, 2018
- Running time: 97 minutes
- Country: Philippines
- Language: Filipino
- Box office: ₱62 million (estimated)

Mary, Marry Me is a 2018 Philippine romantic comedy film directed by RC Delos Reyes and starring Toni Gonzaga, Alex Gonzaga, and Sam Milby. This marks the first film to star the Gonzaga sisters, and the reunion project between Toni Gonzaga and Sam Milby, who starred in 2009's Ang Tanging Pamilya: A Marry Go Round. Mary, Marry Me was released on December 25, 2018, as an official entry to the 2018 Metro Manila Film Festival.

== Cast ==
=== Main cast ===
- Toni Gonzaga as Mary Jane "MJ" Lagman
  - Sharlene San Pedro as young Mary Jane
- Alex Gonzaga as Mary Anne "MA" Lagman
  - Junyka Santarin as young Mary Anne
- Sam Milby as Peter "Pete" Cummings

=== Supporting cast ===
- Bayani Agbayani as Gardo
- Melai Cantiveros as Carey
- Moi Bien as Verna
- Rubi Rubi as Toyang
- Fabio Ide as Matt
- Yayo Aguila as Beth Lagman
- Allan Paule as Ruben Lagman
- Milo Elmido as Caramel
- Jade Soberano as Honey
- Divine Aucina as Jessica
- Rufa Mae Quinto as Pichie
- Crisanta Gonzaga (cameo)
- Seve Soriano (cameo)

== Release ==
- Philippines
  - December 25, 2018 (via the Metro Manila Film Festival)
- Worldwide
  - January 7, 2019
- KBO Channel
  - February 16–17, 2019
- KBO on TFC and TFC.TV
