= Allan Paule =

Filipino actor

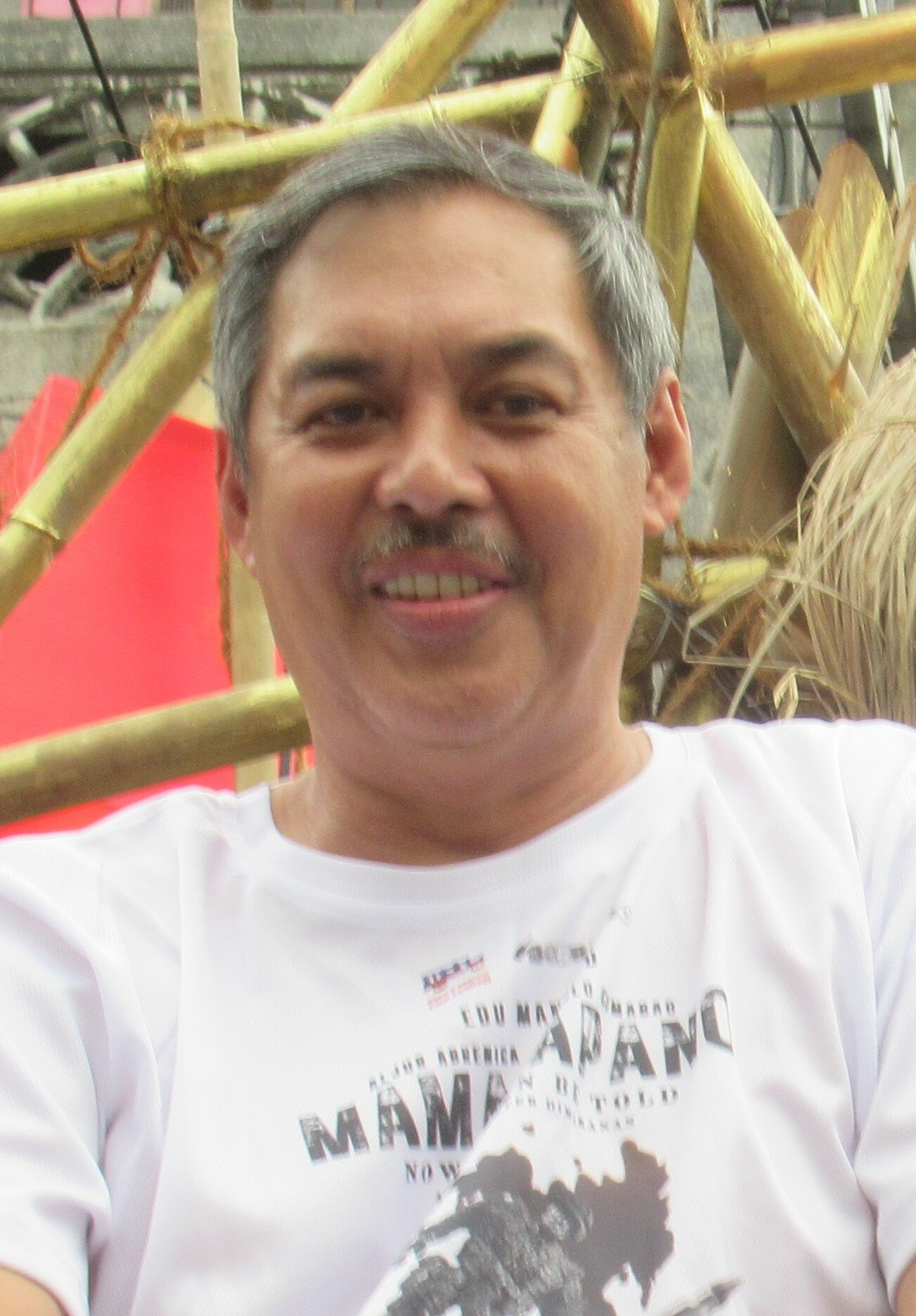
- Paule in 2022

Personal details
- Born: Cebu City, Philippines
- Party: UNA (2015–2016)
- Other political affiliations: Liberal (2012–2013)
- Occupation: Actor

Allan Paule De Guzman, better known as Allan Paule, is a Filipino actor. Paule has appeared in more than 100 movies and television series. Paule also unsuccessfully ran for councilor of Muntinlupa's 1st district in 2013 and 2016.

== Filmography ==
=== Film ===
Year	Title	Role
2026	Tayo sa Wakas	
2025	Lola Barang	
2024	Pula	Canor
2024	The Blood Brothers	
2021	Huwag Kang Lalabas	Buboy (segment: Hotel)
2021	Anak ng Macho Dancer	Pol
2019	Unbreakable	Dodi
2019	Circa	
2019	Mystery of the Night	
2019	Elise	
2019	Bato: The Gen. Ronald dela Rosa Story	Governor
2019	Boy Tokwa: Lodi ng Gapo	
2018	All Souls Night	
2018	Jack Em Popoy: The Puliscredibles	Bebong and Bebang's father
2018	Mary, Marry Me	Ruben Lagman
2018	Aurora	Eddie
2018	Kahit Ayaw Mo Na	Dong
2018	Mama's Girl	Mario
2017	Bes and the Beshies	
2016	Vince and Kath and James	Kath's father
2016	1st Sem	
2015	Haunted Mansion	Ella's father
2014	She's Dating the Gangster	Older Jigs Bala
2012	The Healing	Ruben
2012	Captive	Fred Siazon
2011	The Road	Greg
2009	Kinatay	Leo
2006	Summer Heat	Andy
2005	Mulawin: The Movie	Temyong
2005	Masahista	Alfredo / Marina Hidalgo
2002	Mano Po	Antonio "Tonyo" Dela Madrid
2000	Deathrow	Cenon
1999	Sa Paraiso ni Efren	Melvin
1998	Magandang Hatinggabi	Rene
1998	Ang Lalaki sa Buhay ni Selya	Carding
1997	Super Ranger Kids	Mikaelo
1990	Gumapang Ka Sa Lusak	Jonathan
1990	Anak ni Baby Ama	Mike
1988	Macho Dancer	Pol

=== Television/Digital ===
Year	Title	Role
2023–2026	FPJ's Batang Quiapo	Police Lieutenant Armando "Mando" Mendoza
2023	The Seed of Love	Robert "Nelson" Jurado
2022	Magpakailanman: Ang Driver na Mr. Pogi (The Carlo San Juan Story)	Jun San Juan
2022	Love in 40 Days	Anton Velasquez
2022	Imbestigador: Maguad Double Murder	Cruz Maguad
2022	Widows' Web	Ramon Innocencio
2022	Agimat ng Agila	Mang Simo
2022	Click, Like, Share: Repair	Edgardo "Gardo" Sandoval
2021	Nagbabagang Luha	Rafael "Paeng" Ignacio
2021	Huwag Kang Mangamba	Fidel Alvarez
2021	Wanted: Ang Serye: Nanay Ko, Karibal Ko	Warlito Pagnanawon
2021	The Lost Recipe	Reuben Napoleon
2021	Paano ang Pangako?	Antonio "Anton" Dominante-Cruz
2020	Paano ang Pasko?	Antonio "Anton" Dominante-Cruz
2020	Ang sa Iyo ay Akin	Nestor Pineda
2019	Imbestigador: Bigti	Romil
2019	The Gift	Andres
2019	Magpakailanman: Mahal Ko ang Asawa ng Ama Ko	Julian
2019	Maalaala Mo Kaya: Wheelchair	Crispin
2019	Sino ang May Sala?: Mea Culpa	Gregorio "Gorio" Catapang
2019	Maalaala Mo Kaya: Black Belt	Isaias
2018	Maalaala Mo Kaya: Dalandan	Juanito
2018	Ipaglaban Mo!: Hayok	Macario
2018	Maalaala Mo Kaya: Bawang	Robert
2018	Magpakailanman: Mga Batang Hubad (The Cyberporn Family Story)	Baron
2018	Maalaala Mo Kaya: Singsing	Daniel
2018	Halik	Agustin "Gustin" Bartolome
2018	Stories for the Soul: Sa aking Mga Kamay	Teddy
2018	Imbestigador: Sirawai Massacre	Jaid Mocaddam
2018	Ipaglaban Mo!: Katiwala	Tony
2018	Tadhana: Masahol Pa sa Hayop	Jaime
2018	Precious Hearts Romances Presents: Araw Gabi	Lucas Rodriguez
2018	Magpakailanman: My Sister, My Love	Ceto
2018	Elehiya	Artemio
2018	Imbestigador: Bata sa Sako	En-En's Father
2018	The Stepdaughters	Mario Dela Rosa
2018	Wildflower	Ben
2018	Imbestigador: Sex-Slave	Jon
2017	Maynila	
2017	Ipaglaban Mo: Pikon	Lemuel's Father
2017	Tadhana: Broken Vows	Mario
2017	Daig Kayo ng Lola Ko: Ang Alamat ni Bernardo Carpio	Bernardo's Father
2017	Maynila: Bilanggo ng Bisyo: The Allan "Dawn" Gaerlan Story	Allan "Dawn" Gaerlan
2017	Wagas: Tiyanak: Bantayan ang Inyong Anak!	Lando
2017	Magpakailanman: I Will Follow You: The Popular Story of Jon Gutierrez and Jelai Andres	Jelai's Father
2017	Ika-6 na Utos	Danilo
2017	Maalaala Mo Kaya: Traysikel	Patricio
2017	Ipaglaban Mo!: Hinala	Val
2017	Pinulot Ka Lang sa Lupa	Hector Marquez
2017	Home Sweetie Home	Mr. Porres
2017	Magpahanggang Wakas	Armand Natividad
2016	Maalaala Mo Kaya: Karnabal	Ramon
2016	FPJ's Ang Probinsyano	Melencio Aguilar
2016	The Greatest Love	Samuel
2016	Hanggang Makita Kang Muli	Lando Sandoval
2015	Baker King	Rey Gatchalian
2015	Ipaglaban Mo!: Sa Aking Paggising	Tatay
2014	Hiram na Alaala	Alexander "Xander" Dizon
2014	Ipaglaban Mo!: Akin ang Asawa Mo	Frank
2014	Mars Ravelo's Dyesebel	Menandro
2013–2014	Honesto	Rolando "Rolly" Jimenez
2013	Anna Karenina	Lucas Fuentebella
2013	My Little Juan	Mark De Guzman
2012–2013	A Beautiful Affair	Henry Lumayang
2012	Magdalena: Anghel sa Putikan	Rodolpo "Dolpo" Fuentebella
2012	Precious Hearts Romances: Hiyas	Lucio
2012	Luna Blanca	Crispin De Jesus
2012	Valiente	Simon
2012	Mundo Man ay Magunaw	Emilio
2011	Ikaw ay Pag-Ibig	Juniore
2011	Nasaan Ka, Elisa?	Alberto Ventura
2011	Mga Nagbabagang Bulaklak	Artemio Flores
2011	Minsan Lang Kita Iibigin	Mr. Villanueva
2010	Little Star	Gener Estrella
2010	May Bukas Pa	Onin
2009	Kambal sa Uma	Aurelio Ocampo
2008	Palos	
2007	Prinsesa ng Banyera	Sigmund Pertierra
2007	Mga Mata ni Anghelita	Marcelo
2007	Sine Novela: Sinasamba Kita	Eddie
2007	Princess Charming	Ronald Santos
2006	Now and Forever: Tinig	Renato
2005	Kampanerang Kuba	Solomon Durano
2005	Encantadia	Dado
2005	Magpakailanman: The Evette Pabalan Story	Mhel
2004	Love to Love: Sweet Exchange	
2003	Narito ang Puso Ko	Allan
2002	Kahit Kailan	Daniel E.
2000	!Oka Tokat	Eduardo (Guest episode)
1999	Marinella	Abel
1996	Bayani	Juan Luna

== Awards and nominations ==
Year	Award(s) / Category(s)	Nominated work(s)	Result
2007	2007 FAMAS Awards for Best Supporting Actor	Summer Heat	Won
2007	2007 Gawad Urian Awards Best Supporting Actor (Pinakamagaling na Pangalawang Aktor) (tied with Lauren Novero)	Summer Heat	Nominated
