= All Souls Night (film) =

2018 Filipino horror film

- Theatrical release poster
- Directed by: Aloy Adlawan
- Written by: Aloy Adlawan
- Produced by: Vicente G. del Rosario III
- Starring: Andi Eigenmann; Allan Paule; Yayo Aguila; Julie Anne San Jose; Kim Last
- Cinematography: Ma. Solita Garcia
- Edited by: Rico Testa
- Music by: Paulo Protacio
- Production company: Viva Films
- Distributed by: Viva Films
- Release date: October 31, 2018
- Running time: 120 minutes
- Country: Philippines
- Language: Filipino

All Souls Night is a 2018 Filipino horror film written and directed by Aloy Adlawan, starring Andi Eigenmann, Allan Paule and Yayo Aguila. The film was produced by Viva Films in co-production with Aliud Entertainment and ImaginePerSecond. It was released in the Philippines on October 31, 2018.

== Cast ==
- Andi Eigenmann as Shirley
- Allan Paule
- Yayo Aguila
- Lhian Gimeno
- Kim Last
- Julie Anne San Jose
