= Jack Em Popoy =

Jack Em Popoy: The Puliscredibles
- Theatrical release poster
- Directed by: Mike Tuviera
- Written by: Rodel Nacianceno
- Produced by: Rodel Nacianceno; Michael Tuviera; Jojo Oconer; Ramel David
- Starring: Coco Martin; Maine Mendoza; Vic Sotto
- Cinematography: Odyssey Flores
- Edited by: Renewin Alano; Tara Illenberger
- Music by: Jessie Lasaten
- Production companies: APT Entertainment; CCM Film Productions; M-Zet Productions
- Distributed by: Axinite Digicinema Inc
- Release date: December 25, 2018
- Running time: 115 minutes
- Country: Philippines
- Language: Filipino
- Budget: ₱96 million
- Box office: ₱383 million (estimated)

Jack Em Popoy: The Puliscredibles is a 2018 Filipino action comedy film directed by Mike Tuviera and starring Coco Martin, Vic Sotto, and Maine Mendoza. Its plot revolves around a team of "puliscredibles"—consisting of three charismatic, adventurous police officers Jack (Martin), Popoy (Sotto), and Emily (Mendoza)—who embark on a mission to stop crimes from occurring within their vicinity. The film was released on December 25, 2018, as an official entry to the 2018 Metro Manila Film Festival.

== Plot ==
Police Executive Master Sergeant (PEMS Perfecto "Popoy/Pops" Fernandez is a veteran police officer and is a doting father to his daughter Police Staff Sergeant (PSSg) Emily "Em" Fernandez. Pops is working at a drug-syndicate led by Don Antonio Montenegro with his children Andrew and Andrea. But Valerie, Antonio's second wife is not fully aware of the family business and Antonio is grooming Angelo to join. Police Captain (P/CAPT) Jacinto "Jack" Halimuyac joins the investigation into the Montenegros. During a police operation, Andrew is arrested but later released by Police Colonel (P/COL) Arturo Punongbayan. The Montenegros resort to more violent measures on Pops. Jack and Pops plan their next move against the Montenegros.

Pops learned that Jack has a lonely past. He and his mother was abandoned by his father, while Jack learned that Emily is not Pops' biological daughter. He is the daughter of Pops' partner Domingo who was killed in a mission. But, Jack finds out that he is Pops' son whom he abandoned. But during a mission where Pops was shot and was taken to the hospital, Jack hears from Em that Pops is his father during a conversation. Pops explained to Jack that when seeking his revenge for the death of his partner, he was setup by Antonio of accepting bribe money and framed for Domingo's death resulting to his imprisonment but was later acquitted. He looked for Jack and his wife Rowena, but failed. Jack also said that he and his mother was forced to leave because Antonio's men tried to kill them and ended up wandering around the streets. They were later adopted by Nanding, Otep and Binoy, until his mother died, prompting Jack to blame Pops for all their miseries. When Arturo learns about the operation, he suspends Jack and Pops while they reiterate that someone from the police force is protecting the Montenegros. After being suspended, Pops proceeds into his operation at the Port Area. He brings Jack with him and when they are at the harbor, Pops handcuffs Jack and said that this mission will be his final encounter with the Montenegros.

Arturo tells Pops to abort his mission, threatening his dismissal. However, Pops sees Arturo pointing a gun at him and shoots him, realizing that he is the one protecting the Montenegros. Jack calls Em for back up, with her telling Jack that what Pops is doing is for him to prove that he loves him. Jack, Pops and Em join forces to defeat the Montenegros. Jack battles against Andrew in an abandoned ship, culminating in Andrew falling into an open pit, killing him instantly. Em fights Andrea inside a container truck being lifted. While trying to get her gun, Andrea falls from the container van to her death. In the warehouse where Domingo was murdered, Pops fights Antonio until the latter is shot by Jack and Em. Afterwards, Pops along with his friends celebrate Jack's birthday.

== Cast ==
=== Main cast ===
- Coco Martin as Police Captain (P/CPT) Jacinto "Jack" Halimuyac
- Vic Sotto as Police Chief Master Seargent (PCMS)"Popoy/Pops" Fernandez
- Maine Mendoza as Patrolwoman Emily "Em" Fernandez

=== Supporting cast ===
- Arjo Atayde as Andrew Montenegro
- Ronaldo Valdez as Antonio Montenegro
- Ryza Cenon as Andrea Montenegro
- Tirso Cruz III as Police Colonel (P/COL) Arturo Punongbayan
- Cherry Pie Picache as Valerie Montenegro
- Jose Manalo as Fernando "Nanding" Halimuyac
- Wally Bayola as Joseph "Otep" Halimuyac
- Paolo Ballesteros as Robin "Binoy" Halimuyac
- Mark Lapid as Police Chief Master Sergeant (PCMS) Gregorio "Greg" Morales
- Ronwaldo Martin as Rico
- Chai Fonacier as Patrolwoman Jonalyn Fuentes
- PJ Endrinal as Bebong
- Ryzza Mae Dizon as Bebang
- Baeby Baste as Angelo Montenegro

=== Guest cast ===
- Lito Lapid as Police Staff Sergeant (PSSg) Domingo
- Whitney Tyson as Angelo's yaya
- Lordivino "Bassilyo" Ignacio
- Bryan "Smugglaz" Lao
- Thomas "Mhot" Lynmuel
- Pedro "Zaito" Canon Jr.
- Roy "Shernan" Gaite
- Marky "Bos×1ne" Maglasang
- Sancho delas Alas as Andrew's men
- Anghel Marcial as Andrew's men
- Wilmar Peñaflorida as Andrew's men
- Benzon Dalina as Andrew's men
- Jelson Bay
- Glydel Mercado as Rowena delos Reyes (Jack's mother)
- Tonton Gutierrez as Police Major (P/MAJ) Reynaldo Halimuyac
- Allan Paule as Bebong and Bebang's father
- Pauleen Luna as herself
- Allan K. as himself
- Luane Dy as herself
- Jerald Napoles as Police Lieutenant (P/LT) James Reidentor Magpayo
- Pekto as Police Corporal (PCpl) Piolo Pasakal

== Production ==
=== Announcement ===
On June 13, 2018, Coco Martin confirmed that he will star in an action movie alongside Vic Sotto. Martin has stated that it was his dream to work with Vic Sotto since he is a fan of the Sotto trio, consisting of Tito, Vic & Joey. The 2018 Metro Manila Film Festival announced that Jack Em Popoy: The Puliscredibles will be one of the four accepted script entries.

On June 29, Maine Mendoza joined the cast as the daughter of Vic Sotto’s character. Ryzza Mae Dizon, Baeby Baste, Jose Manalo, Wally Bayola, Ryza Cenon, Arjo Atayde, Cherry Pie Picache, Tirso Cruz III and Ronaldo Valdez were also confirmed to be part of the movie. According to Vic Sotto, this will be Maine Mendoza’s first role in the action genre, while there are challenges she had to tackle with.

On July 16, Coco Martin was initially attached to direct the movie, but due to directorial conflicts with the acclaimed television series FPJ's Ang Probinsyano, who also had Martin as one of the directors, he drops out and decides to be the producer instead, with Mike Tuviera signing on as the new director considering his successful track record. Despite this, Martin freely admitted that he will still handle the creative aspects of the movie.

== Release ==
The movie was released on December 25, 2018, by Axinite Digicinema Inc. in the Philippines, and produced by APT Entertainment, CCM Productions and M-Zet Productions. It is one of the eight entries selected for the 2018 Metro Manila Film Festival. Coco Martin will have a fifty percent share as a producer in terms of box office sales and revenue.

== Critical reception ==
Francis Joseph Cruz of Rappler bemoaned the film's plot, recycled gags and lack of innovation, stating: "One of its bigger problems is that it never endeavored to expand its kind of fun. For all the film's crisscrossing between comedy and action, it never felt anything more than just a generic hodgepodge." He also expressed concern about Jack Em Popoy's violent content, taking umbrage at what he saw as "a bigger issue here than just the gross lack of creative ambition." especially with young children as its intended audience.

Michelle Anne P. Soliman of BusinessWorld was somewhat less critical, stating "I sat in theater dreading the probable shallowness of the storyline. But it turned out to be more bearable than I expected. Simply put, the story presented issues on loss, abandonment, and criminality starring main actors from Eat Bulaga!'s "Kalyeserye" (excluding Alden Richards) and the lead actor of Ang Probinsyano." She also praised Mendoza and Martin's acting and noted the stark absence of product placement which was common in Vic Sotto productions, but felt that the Eat Bulaga segment was unnecessary, speculating that it was merely to give Pauleen Luna a cameo appearance.

== Notes ==
- The characters of Nanding, Otep and Binoy played by Jose Manalo, Wally Bayola and Paolo Ballesteros are personifications of Fernando Poe, Jr., Joseph Estrada and Robin Padilla.
- Some of the casts became part of Coco Martin's series Ang Probinsyano.

== Awards and nominations ==
Year	Award-Giving Body	Category	Recipient	Result
2018
2018	Metro Manila Film Festival			
2018	Metro Manila Film Festival	Fernando Poe Jr. Memorial Award for Excellence	Jack Em Popoy	Won
2018	Metro Manila Film Festival	Best Editing	Tara Illenberger and Renewin Alano	Won
2018	Metro Manila Film Festival	Best Float	Jack Em Popoy	Won
2018	Metro Manila Film Festival	Best Picture	Jack Em Popoy	Nominated
2019	Metro Manila Film Festival	PMPC Star Awards for Movies		
2019	Movie Love Team of the Year	PMPC Star Awards for Movies	Coco Martin and Maine Mendoza	Nominated
2019	Movie Actor of the Year	PMPC Star Awards for Movies	Coco Martin	Nominated
2019	Movie Actor of the Year	PMPC Star Awards for Movies	Vic Sotto	Nominated
