= Sue Prado =

Filipina actress (1981–2026)

- Born: Marissa Sue Mera Prado; May 18, 1981
- Died: April 14, 2026 (aged 44); Quezon City, Philippines
- Education: University of the Philippines Los Baños (AB)
- Occupation: Actress
- Years active: 2006–2026

Marissa Sue Mera Prado (May 18, 1981 – April 14, 2026) was a Filipino actress best known for her performances in Philippine New Wave films such as Oro and Barber's Tales (both in 2013), among other roles in film, television, and theatre.

== Early life and education ==
Marissa Sue Mera Prado was born on May 18, 1981, to Corazon Mera and was among five siblings. She finished high school in 1998 at the Quezon City Science High School and a Bachelor of Arts degree in communication arts, majoring in theatre at the University of the Philippines Los Baños.

== Career ==
Prado began her career in 2006. She is the first appearance of Abadeha Neo-Ethnic Rock Cinderella, named character Abadeha in 2007.

== Death ==
Prado died on April 14, 2026, from cardiac arrest at the age of 44. Public viewing of her cremation remains took place from April 17 to 20 at the Loyola Memorial Chapels and Crematorium in Quezon City and inurned on April 26 at Loyola Memorial Park in Marikina.

== Filmography ==
=== Film ===
Year	Title	Role
2007	Abadeha Neo-Ethnic Rock Cinderella	Abadeha (credited as Marissa Sue Prado)
2008	No Way Out	Gina
2009	Manila Skies	Diana
2011	Thelma	Marie
2012	Corazon: Ang Unang Aswang	Concha
2013	Barber's Tales	Rosa
2014	Shake, Rattle & Roll XV (Segment: "Flight 666")	Norma
2018	Rainbow's Sunset	Nena
2018	Aurora	Mrs. Amado
2019	Dagsin	Grace
2023	GomBurZa	Teodora Alonso Realonda
2024	Your Mother's Son	Sara
2024	How to Slay a Nepo Baby	
2025	Elsewhere at Night (Ailleurs la nuit)	
2025	Quezon	Ana Ricardo (Last film appearance)

=== Television / digital series ===
Year	Title	Role
2011	Munting Heredera	Nerissa
2012	Legacy	young Sofia Altamirano
2013	Kakambal ni Eliana	Cora
2013	Titser	Mrs. Reyes
2014	Ilustrado	Saturnina
2014	Sa Puso ni Dok	Lisa
2014	Pure Love	Sally
2015	Ricky Lee's Nasaan Ka Nang Kailangan Kita	Kristel
2016	Alyas Robin Hood	Cynthia de Jesus
2016–2017	FPJ's Ang Probinsyano	Lita Escaño
2017	Ipaglaban Mo!: Kulam	Mercy
2017	Wagas: Tiyanak (Bantayan ang Inyong Anak!)	Selma
2017	Tadhana: Millionaire Maid	Lilibet Bulan
2017	Karelasyon: Finale	Isabel
2017–2018	Hanggang Saan	Marjorie
2018	Wagas: Hanggang Langit	Anna
2018	Tadhana: DH for Sale	Sharon
2018	Maalaala Mo Kaya: Bantay Bata	Gigi
2018	Magpakailanman: Ina, Dapat Ba kitang Patawarin?	Mila
2018	Inday Will Always Love You	Terry
2018	Wagas: Baliw na Puso	Jerry's Mother
2018	Tadhana: Ang Disgrasyada	Neefa
2018	Sirkus	Nemila
2019	Tadhana: Yaya CEO	Pilar
2019	Ang Babae sa Septic Tank 3: The Real Untold Story of Josephine Bracken	Maria
2019	Magpakailanman: Ang Batang Sinagip ng Kapre	Darla
2019	Magpagkailanman: Male Sex Slave sa Saudi	Madam Sadeem
2019	Tadhana: Chop-Chop Lady	Ruth
2019	Sahaya	Lorie
2019	Maalaala Mo Kaya: 600 Pesos	Tita
2019	Magpakailanman: Fathers and Lovers	Aling Dina
2020	Descendants of the Sun: The Philippine Adaptation	Sheila
2020	Madrasta	Beth
2021	Wish Ko Lang!: Maling Akala	Loida
2021	The Lost Recipe	Honey Napoleon
2022	Lolong	Riza dela Torre
2022	Mano Po Legacy: The Family Fortune	Elena "Ellen" Garces
2022	Bolera	P/CMS Romana "Roma" Canlas
2022	Mano Po Legacy: The Flower Sisters	Belinda Morales
2023	Sparkle U: #Frenemies	Zarah Martinez
2023–2024	Abot-Kamay na Pangarap	Mildred
2023	The Iron Heart	Diana Salonga
2024	Makiling	Elena Dimasalang- Lirio
2024	Black Rider	Rose
2025	Prinsesa ng City Jail	Vanessa "Bane"
2025	My Father's Wife	Nora
2026	FPJ's Batang Quiapo	Gina (Prado's finale & last television series, appearance before her death)

=== Online series ===
Year	Title	Role
2020	Gameboys	Leila Lazaro
