= Billie and Emma =

2018 drama film by Samantha Lee

- Directed by: Samantha Lee
- Screenplay by: Samantha Lee
- Produced by: Phyllis Grande; Samantha Lee
- Starring: Gabby Padilla; Zar Donato
- Cinematography: Mycko David
- Release date: October 22, 2018
- Running time: 107 minutes
- Country: Philippines
- Language: Tagalog

Billie and Emma is a 2018 Filipino drama film, directed by Samantha Lee. It is an LGBTQ coming-of-age story set in the mid-1990s, and is Lee's sophomore feature film.

== Synopsis ==
Billie is a teenage girl who is sent from Manila to the remote town of San Isidro, Northern Samar to attend a Catholic girls school, where her father hopes she will learn not to be a lesbian. She lives with her aunt, who is also the religion teacher at the school, who instructs the girls on the sinfulness of homosexuality and abortion. Billie tries to fit in at her new school, hoping to make it through the last year of high school without incident, and then go back to Manila to study music. But with her short hair and combat boots, she is a clear outlier, drawing the scorn of her fellow students, including the popular Emma. Emma is the daughter of a single mother who is looked down upon in town, but she gains recognition as the star student and most popular girl in the school. Emma and Billie are assigned to do a class project together, and very soon, the two begin to influence each other, and then they fall in love.

The complication in the story comes when Emma finds out she is pregnant with her boyfriend Miguel, whose role in her life remained unclear during her time with Billie. Miguel wants to marry her, her mother encourages her to get an abortion, and Billie wants to win money at a talent show to help take care of the baby. But Emma wants her own way and her own decisions. However, she is facing expulsion from school and loss of her scholarships, and therefore an uncertain future.

== Cast ==
- Gabby Padilla as Emma
- Zar Donato as Billie
- Beauty Gonzalez as Amy
- Cielo Aquino as Miss Castro
- Ryle Paolo Santiago as Miguel
- Shiara Joy Dizon as Twinkle
- Dolly de Leon as Sister Mary

== Background ==
Lee, who wrote, directed and produced Billie and Emma, stated that she is making movies that her younger self "needed to see", as she had grown up without seeing representation of herself as a queer youth in the media, and was left feeling invisible. According to her, she made sure this film did that which she thought would never happen in her lifetime: cast queer actors to play queer roles, in a film directed by a queer director. Lee also relates that her trigger for writing the screenplay was actually a series of anti-LGBT tweets, particularly surrounding the legislation of same-sex marriage in Taiwan. One tweet in particular called for "No to SOGIE. Yes to family!", which made her want to envision different variations of what a family could be, and whether a teen-aged girl could step up as a father.

== Reception ==
The review on Philippines news channel ABS-CBN found reviewer Andrew Paredes "gratified" that in the movies, "LGBTQ people feel less and less apologetic about existing". He appreciated the way Lee manages to include worlds inside worlds in this apparently limited setting of small-town school, but also found some of the character development hard to swallow. Matthew Escosia, in his review of Billie and Emma, liked the sweetness with which the central characters' developing relationship was treated, and found the film charismatic; he did not like the resolution for one of the characters. Preview Magazine listed five reasons to see Billie and Emma, among them that the film is more than an LGBT coming-of-age story, but also deals with other teenage issues such as unwanted pregnancy and personal agency; the reviewer found the film lighthearted, and lauded it for casting lesbian actors in the lesbian roles.

== Awards ==
Year	Award	Category	Nominee	Result
2019	FAMAS Awards	Outstanding performance by an Actress in a Supporting Role	Cielo Aquino	Nominated
2019	FAMAS Awards	Outstanding Performance by an Actress in a Leading Role	Gabby Padilla	Nominated
2019	PMPC Star Awards	New Movie Actress of the Year	Gabby Padilla	Nominated
2019	Inside Out Film Festival	Audience Award for Best Narrative Feature	Billie and Emma	Won

=== Festival screenings (official selections) ===
- QCinema International Film Festival 2018
- Osaka Asian Film Festival 2019
- TLVfest 2019
- Roze Filmdagen Amsterdam LGBTQ+ Film Festival
- Frameline San Francisco International LGBTQ

== See also ==
- List of LGBT-related films directed by women
