= One Great Love (film) =

2018 Filipino romance drama film

- Theatrical release poster
- Directed by: Enrico S. Quizon
- Written by: Gina Marissa Tagasa
- Produced by: Lily Y. Monteverde; Roselle Y. Monteverde
- Starring: Dennis Trillo; Kim Chiu; J. C. de Vera
- Cinematography: Mo Zee
- Edited by: Chrisel G. Desuasido
- Music by: Miguel Mendoza
- Production company: Regal Entertainment
- Release date: December 25, 2018
- Country: Philippines
- Language: Filipino
- Box office: ₱38 million (estimated)

One Great Love is a 2018 Filipino romance drama film directed by Eric Quizon, starring Dennis Trillo and Kim Chiu together with JC de Vera.

The movie is an official entry to the 2018 Metro Manila Film Festival.

== Plot ==
The story revolves around Zyra Paez (Kim Chiu), whose First relationship with Carl Mauricio (JC de Vera) has failed. She decides to give their relationship one more try, but soon finds herself filled with doubt over her life choices. The situation gets even more complex when she meets and befriends Ian Arcano (Dennis Trillo), a heart doctor who later become her confidante, leaving her trying to decide whether he may be "the one".

== Cast ==
Main cast

- Dennis Trillo as Dr. Ian Arcano
- Kim Chiu as Zyra Paez
- JC de Vera as Carl Mauricio

Supporting cast

- Eric Quizon as Dante Paez
- Miles Ocampo as Jemy Paez
- Marlo Mortel as Bryan
- Niña Dolino as Annie
