= Rainbow's Sunset =

- Theatrical release poster
- Directed by: Joel Lamangan
- Screenplay by: Eric Ramos
- Story by: Ferdinand Dizon Lapuz; Joel Lamangan; Eric Ramos
- Produced by: Harlene Bautista
- Starring: Eddie Garcia; Tony Mabesa; Gloria Romero
- Cinematography: Rain Yamson II
- Edited by: Mai Calapardo
- Music by: Emerzon Texon
- Production companies: Heaven's Best Entertainment; EG Productions
- Distributed by: Solar Pictures
- Release date: December 25, 2018
- Running time: 110 minutes
- Country: Philippines
- Language: Filipino
- Box office: ₱50 million

Rainbow's Sunset is a 2018 Philippine romantic drama film directed by Joel Lamangan from a story and screenplay written by Eric Ramos, with Lamangan and Ferdinand Dizon Lapuz co-writing the former. Starring Eddie Garcia, Tony Mabesa, and Gloria Romero, the film revolves around an 84-year-old man who came out as gay to his family and decided to take care of a man he loved. Supporting cast includes Tirso Cruz III, Aiko Melendez, and Sunshine Dizon while Max Collins, Shido Roxas, and Ross Pesigan play the younger versions of the lead stars' characters. It was also the last movie of Eddie Garcia and Gloria Romero in their lifetime before they died in June 2019 and January 2025, respectively.

Produced by Heaven's Best Entertainment and EG Productions and distributed by Solar Pictures, the film was theatrically released on December 25, 2018, as one of the official entries for the 44th Metro Manila Film Festival.

== Plot ==
84-year-old Ramon announces to his family his decision to move to the house of his cancer-stricken lover, Fredo, to take care of him. Each of his children has his or her own troubles and victories, and so does his wife, Sylvia and he was torn between his duty on his family, and his true love. His children, who already know he is gay, are bewildered as to why he moves out and are also confused by the acceptance of his wife, Sylvia.

In flashbacks, Ramon is revealed to have been a student funded by Fredo's rich family. He falls in love with Fredo, who helps him launch his political career. In 1969, their affair is discovered by Sylvia, who accepts Fredo when he assures her that he shares his love for Ramon with those he loves.

In the present day, Ramon moves to Fredo's home to take care of him, scandalizing his adult children, who try to cover up their relationship when Ramon and Fredo show up at an event. Furious, the couple storm off. Ramon shortly dies afterwards and the children, realizing how much their relationship meant, accompany Sylvia who decides to care for Fredo in Ramon's place.

== Cast ==
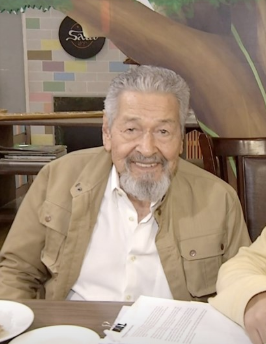
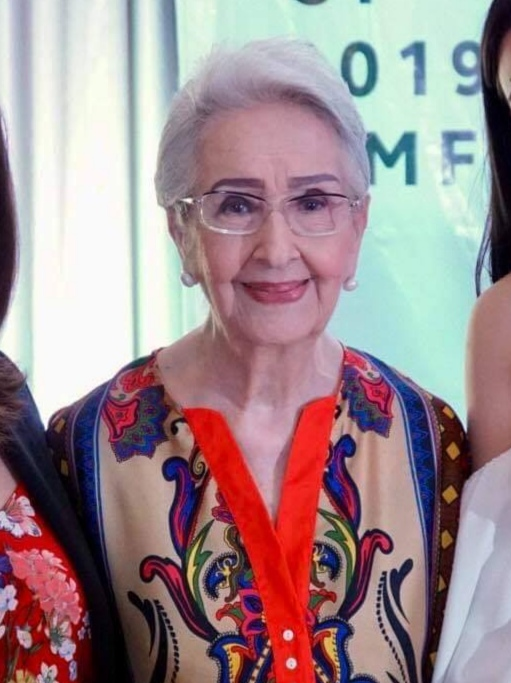
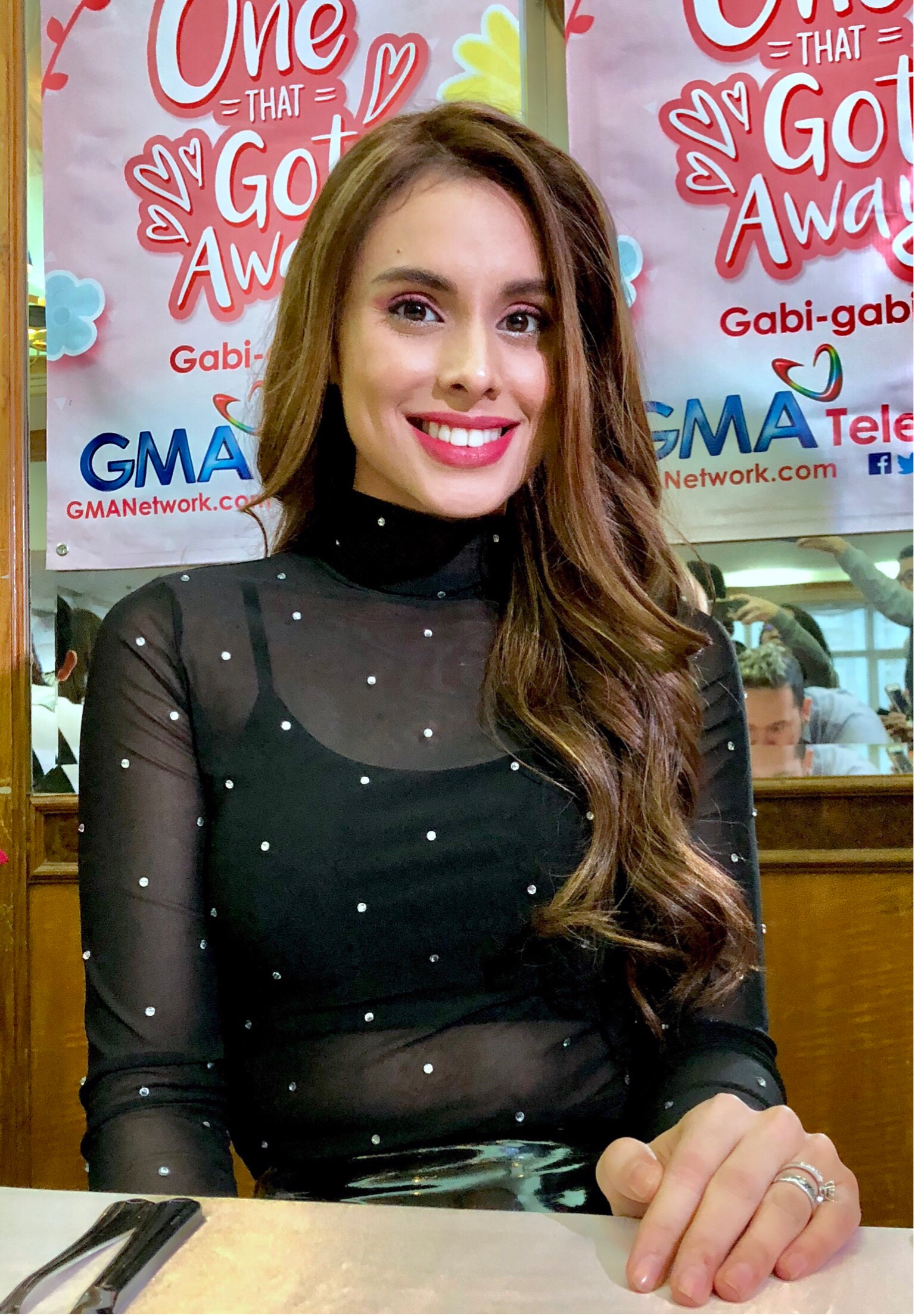
Eddie Garcia (left) and Gloria Romero (middle) play the respective roles of Ramon and Sylvia Estrella, with Max Collins (right) plays the younger Sylvia.

=== Main cast ===
- Eddie Garcia as Ramoncito "Ramon" Estrella
- Tony Mabesa as Alfredo "Fredo" Veneracion
- Gloria Romero as Sylvia Estrella

=== Supporting cast ===
- Tirso Cruz III as Emmanuel "Emman" Estrella
- Aiko Melendez as Georgina "George" Estrella
- Sunshine Dizon as Marife "Fe" Estrella
- Max Collins as Young Sylvia
- Shido Roxas as Young Ramon
- Ross Pesigan as Young Fredo
- Jim Pebanco as Benjamin "Ben" Cruz
- Albie Casiño as Jonel
- Sue Prado as Nena
- Tanya Gomez as Merly
- Marcus Madrigal as Andy
- Adrian Cabino as Jairus
- Zeke Sarmenta as Lara
- Noel Comia Jr. as Rufus
- Nella Marie Dizon as Bessie
- Ali Forbes as Cathy

== Reception ==
=== Critical reception ===
Ysh Cabana of The Philippine Reporter wrote "At time unwittingly funny and served with as much histrionics, the plot felt a bit superficial. While there are notable technical misgivings in the script as whole, there is potential goldmine at the end of the Rainbow."

=== Accolades ===
The movie was an official entry to the 2018 Metro Manila Film Festival, and bagged 11 awards, making it MMFF 2018's big winner.

Accolades received by Broken Heart's Trip
Award	Date of ceremony	Category	Recipient(s)	Result	Ref.
2018 Metro Manila Film Festival	December 27, 2018	Best Picture	Rainbow's Sunset	Won	
2018 Metro Manila Film Festival	December 27, 2018	Best Director	Joel Lamangan	Won	
2018 Metro Manila Film Festival	December 27, 2018	Best Actor	Eddie Garcia	Nominated	
2018 Metro Manila Film Festival	December 27, 2018	Best Actress	Gloria Romero	Won	
2018 Metro Manila Film Festival	December 27, 2018	Best Supporting Actor	Tony Mabesa	Won	
2018 Metro Manila Film Festival	December 27, 2018	Best Supporting Actor	Tirso Cruz III	Nominated	
2018 Metro Manila Film Festival	December 27, 2018	Best Supporting Actress	Aiko Melendez	Won	
2018 Metro Manila Film Festival	December 27, 2018	Best Supporting Actress	Sunshine Dizon	Nominated	
2018 Metro Manila Film Festival	December 27, 2018	Best Screenplay	Eric Ramos	Won	
2018 Metro Manila Film Festival	December 27, 2018	Best Cinematography	Rain Yamson II	Nominated	
2018 Metro Manila Film Festival	December 27, 2018	Best Production Design	Jay Custodio	Won	
2018 Metro Manila Film Festival	December 27, 2018	Best Editing	Mai Calapardo	Nominated	
2018 Metro Manila Film Festival	December 27, 2018	Best Sound	Albert Michael Idioma, Alex Tomboc	Nominated	
2018 Metro Manila Film Festival	December 27, 2018	Best Original Theme Song	Sa'yo Na – Ice Seguerra	Won	
2018 Metro Manila Film Festival	December 27, 2018	Best Musical Score	Emerzon Texon	Nominated	
2018 Metro Manila Film Festival	December 27, 2018	Gatpuno Antonio J. Villegas Cultural Award	Rainbow's Sunset	Won	
2018 Metro Manila Film Festival	December 27, 2018	Special Jury Prize	Max Collins	Won	
2018 Metro Manila Film Festival	December 27, 2018	Special Jury Prize	Eddie Garcia	Won	
