= Yam Laranas =

Filipino director and cinematographer (born 1978)

- Born: William Laranas; December 12, 1978; Davao City, Philippines
- Occupations: Director, screenwriter, actor, producer

William Laranas (born 12 December 1978) is a Filipino director, screenwriter, producer and cinematographer.

== Biography ==
=== Early life ===
Laranas studied filmmaking at the Mowelfund Film Institute and is currently a professor of Cinematography at the Ateneo de Manila University.

== Filmography ==
Year	Title	Credited as				Notes
Year	Title	Director	Screen writer	Producer	Cinematographer	Notes
1990	Unison	Yes	No	No	No	
1992	Bayani	No	No	No	Yes	Cinematography shared with Raymond Red
1993	Memories of Old Manila	No	No	No	Yes	
1994	Isaak	No	No	No	Yes	
1995	The Sex Warriors and the Samurai	No	No	No	Yes	
1996	Habang May Buhay	No	No	No	Yes	
1997	The Man in Selya's Life	No	No	No	Yes	
1997	Diliryo	Assistant director	No	No	No	Camera and Electrical Dept. and additional crew
2000	Buwan	No	No	No	Yes	
2001	Cats Hair o Balahibong Pusa	Yes	Yes	No	Yes	
2001	Radyo or Radio	Yes	Story	No	Yes	Story and Screenplay
2002	Ikaw Lamang Hanggang Ngayon or Only You	Yes	No	No	Yes	
2002	Hibla or Thread	Yes	No	No	Yes	
2004	Sigaw or The Echo	Yes	Story	No	Yes	Story and screenplay
2008	The Echo	Yes	No	No	No	Hollywood remake
2009	Patient X	Yes	Story	Yes	Yes	Story and screenplay
2011	The Road	Yes	Yes	Yes	No	Editing and additional crew
2018	Abomination	Yes	Story	Yes	Yes	
2018	All Soul's Night	No	No	Yes	No	Creative executive
2018	Aurora	Yes	Yes	Yes	Yes	Editor
2019	Adan	No	Story	Yes	No	
2020	Night Shift	Yes	Yes	Yes	Yes	
2021	Death of a Girlfriend	Yes	Yes	No	Yes	
2021	Paraluman	Yes	Yes	No	Yes	
2022	Greed	Yes	Yes	No	Yes	
2022	Rooftop	Yes	Story	Yes	Yes	
2022	The Escort Wife	No	Story	Yes	No	Story and screenplay
2022	Laruan	Yes	Yes	No	Yes	
2023	Bugaw	Yes	Yes	No	Yes	Music

== Accolades ==
Awards and nominations received by Zig Dulay
Awards and recognition
Organization	Year	Nominated work	Category	Result	Ref.
Brussels International Festival of Fantasy Film (BIFF)	2005	Sigaw or The Echo	Special Award	Won	
The EDDY's Awards	2023	Greed	Best Cinematography	Nominated	
FAMAS Awards	2012	The Road	Best Picture	Nominated	
FAMAS Awards	2012	The Road	Best Director	Nominated	
FAMAS Awards	2012	The Road	Best Story	Nominated	
FAMAS Awards	2012	The Road	Best Cinematography	Nominated	
FAMAS Awards	2012	The Road	Best Editing (shared with Mae Carzon)	Nominated	
Gawad Urian Awards	1993	Bayani	Best Cinematographer	Nominated	
Golden Screen Movie Awards	2012	The Road	Best Cinematography	Nominated	
Luna Awards (FAP)	2005	Sigaw or The Echo	Best Cinematography	Nominated	
Metro Manila Film Festival	2018	Aurora	Best Picture	Nominated	
Metro Manila Film Festival	2018	Aurora	Best Director	Nominated	
Metro Manila Film Festival	2018	Aurora	Best Screenplay (shared with Gin De Mesa)	Nominated	
Metro Manila Film Festival	2018	Aurora	Best Cinematography	Won	
Metro Manila Film Festival	2018	Aurora	Best Editing (shared with Rico Testa)	Nominated	
PMPC Star Awards for Movies	2012	The Road	Movie of the Year	Nominated	
PMPC Star Awards for Movies	2012	The Road	Movie Director of the Year	Nominated	
PMPC Star Awards for Movies	2012	The Road	Movie Cinematographer of the Year	Nominated	
PMPC Star Awards for Movies	2022	Night Shift	Movie of the Year	Nominated	
PMPC Star Awards for Movies	2022	Night Shift	Movie Director of the Year	Nominated	
PMPC Star Awards for Movies	2022	Night Shift	Movie Cinematographer of the Year	Nominated	
Sinag Maynila Film Festival	2018	Abomination	Best Picture	Nominated	
Sinag Maynila Film Festival	2018	Abomination	Best Director	Nominated	
Sinag Maynila Film Festival	2018	Abomination	Best Cinematography	Nominated	
Young Critics Circle	2003	Ikaw Lamang Hanggang Ngayon	Best Achievement in Cinematography and Visual Design	Won	
Young Critics Circle	2005	Sigaw or The Echo	Best Film	Nominated	
Young Critics Circle	2005	Sigaw or The Echo	Best Screenplay	Nominated	
Young Critics Circle	2005	Sigaw or The Echo	Best Achievement in Cinematography and Visual Design	Won	
