= Hello Stranger (web series) =

Philippine web series

- Genre: Romantic comedy; Drama; Boys' love
- Written by: Patrick Valencia
- Directed by: Petersen Vargas
- Starring: Tony Labrusca; JC Alcantara
- Opening theme: "Kahit Na Anong Sabihin Ng Iba" by Seth Fedelin
- Composer: Gabriel Tagadtag
- Country of origin: Philippines
- Original languages: Filipino; English
- No. of episodes: 8

Production
- Executive producers: Carlo Katigbak; Olivia Lamasan
- Producers: Kriz Gazmen; Nailen Garalde; Alemberg Ang
- Editor: Apol Dating
- Running time: 16 – 27 minutes
- Production company: Black Sheep Productions

Original release
- Network: YouTube; Facebook
- Release: June 24 – August 19, 2020

Hello Stranger (sometimes styled as Hello, Stranger) is a Philippine romantic comedy web series starring Tony Labrusca and JC Alcantara.

Directed by Petersen Vargas and produced by Black Sheep Productions, the series premiered on YouTube and Facebook on June 24, 2020. It concluded on August 19, 2020, and is available for streaming on iWantTFC. This series streamed on Netflix PH on May 10, 2021.

== Plot ==
Amidst the lockdowns due to the COVID-19 pandemic, two college boys in Adamson University are about to cross paths for a school project. Mico (JC Alcantara), a nerdy college student gets to partner with the star basketball player Xavier (Tony Labrusca). Despite their stark differences, the two boys get to form an unlikely bond that goes beyond friendship through their several online interactions.

== Cast and characters ==
Below are the cast of the series:

=== Main ===
- Tony Labrusca as Xavier de Guzman
- JC Alcantara as Mico Ramos

=== Supporting ===
- Vivoree Esclito as Kookai Yambao
- Patrick Quiroz as Seph Policarpio
- Miguel Almendras as Junjun Sandico
- Gillian Vicencio as Crystal Santos
- Meann Espinosa as Prof. Kristine Moran

== Production ==
On June 14, 2020, Black Sheep Productions, a division of ABS-CBN Films, previewed a teaser about their launching their first boys' love series at the height of the popularity of 2gether: The series, a Thai boys' love series. Petersen Vargas, who also directed 2 Cool 2 Be 4gotten, Lisyun Qng Geografia, and Hanging Out, was named as the web series' director. Tony Labrusca was among the first cast revealed to be part of the series along with JC Alcantara, who played the role of Bogs in Halik. Aside from Labrusca and Alcantara, Gillian Vicencio, Vivoree Esclito, Patrick Quiroz and Miguel Almendras were also announced as part of the cast.

== Episodes ==
No.	Title	Directed by	Written by	Original release date
1	"Hello Enemy!"	Petersen Vargas	Patrick Valencia	June 24, 2020
When Mico organizes an online quiz night with his barkada, he is surprised when the school's popular basketball player, Xavier, joins in and insults them. Little does Mico know that this won't be the last time he'll be seeing Xavier.
2	"Hello Feelings"	Petersen Vargas	Patrick Valencia	July 1, 2020
After Mico liked his photo, Xavier teases him about not accepting his follow request. Meanwhile, Mico gives unsolicited advice to Xavier that may ruin their partnership.
3	"Hello Heartbeat"	Petersen Vargas	Patrick Valencia	July 8, 2020
A failed attempt to workout with The Young Padawans leads Mico to notice his surging heartbeat at the thought of Xavier. This giddy yet confusing feeling escalates as a heartbroken Xavier invites Mico to a watch party.
4	"Hello Happiness"	Petersen Vargas	Patrick Valencia	July 15, 2020
The Young Padawans' quiz night takes a surprising turn when an unexpected guest joins the fun. Later on, Xavier asks Mico for a favor he can't refuse.
5	"Hello Sadness"	Petersen Vargas	Patrick Valencia	July 22, 2020
Tensions rise among The Young Padawans which could put a dent in their friendship. Meanwhile, Xavier tries to cheer Mico up with a few surprises.
6	"Hello Heartbreak"	Petersen Vargas	Patrick Valencia	July 29, 2020
7	"Hello Truth"	Petersen Vargas	Patrick Valencia	August 5, 2020
As the two practice their final performance, Mico and Xavier find themselves in an awkward and heart-rending situation. With both parties wounded, will either one be brave enough to save this partnership?
8	"Hello Promise"	Petersen Vargas	Patrick Valencia	August 19, 2020

== Reception ==
Its pilot episode garnered more than one million views from its digital medium several days after it was released on June 24, 2020. Prior to the release of its eighth and final episode, the web series accumulated more than fourteen million views. On August 16, 2020, the cast held its first digital fan conference.

== Film sequel ==
A full-length film sequel to the web series was announced by its lead actors during the digital fan conference on August 16, 2020, and was confirmed by Black Sheep Productions with a tweet saying "Not a Zoom movie guys, but an actual live movie!". The film sequel was released on 12 February 2021 on KTX, iWantTFC, TFC IPTV PPV, Sky Cable PPV and Cignal PPV.

== Soundtracks ==
Song title	Artist	Ref.
Kahit Na Anong Sabihin Ng Iba	Seth Fedelin	
Kahit Na Anong Sabihin Ng Iba (Cover)	Tony Labrusca; JC Alcantara	

== See also ==
- Gameboys
- Gaya Sa Pelikula
- Ben X Jim
- Boys Lockdown
- Oh, Mando!
- The Boy Foretold by the Stars
- "Bad Buddy"
