= Ben X Jim =

Philippine web series

- Promotional poster
- Genre: Romance; Drama; Boys' love
- Written by: Easy Ferrer
- Directed by: Easy Ferrer
- Starring: Teejay Marquez Jerome Ponce
- Country of origin: Philippines
- Original languages: Tagalog; English
- No. of seasons: 2
- No. of episodes: 15

Production
- Executive producers: Roselle Monteverde; Lily Monteverde
- Production location: Philippines
- Running time: 27–43 minutes
- Production company: Regal Entertainment

Original release
- Network: YouTube (Regal Entertainment); Heart of Asia Channel (season 1); Upstream.PH (season 2)
- Release: October 15, 2020 – April 9, 2021

Ben x Jim is a 2020 Philippine boy's love web series produced by Regal Entertainment. Written and directed by Easy Ferrer, it stars Teejay Marquez and Jerome Ponce as childhood friends who fall in love years later in a reunion amid the confining space of quarantine in their neighborhood amid the pandemic.

The series premiered on YouTube on October 15, 2020, airing every Thursday at 8:00 PM PST and ran for seven episodes. A second season for the series was released on February 12, 2021 via Upstream.PH.

== Cast and characters ==
=== Main ===
- Teejay Marquez as Benjamin "Ben" Mendoza, Jim's childhood friend and currently living alone next door
- Jerome Ponce as Jimson "Jim" Alcantara, Ben's childhood friend and car enthusiast from Davao

=== Supporting ===
- Sarah Edwards as Yana, Jim's girlfriend
- Kat Galang as Flo Guimary, Ben's very close friend
- Ron Martin Angeles as Olan, motorcycle rider for Deliver Lover
- Johannes Rissler as Leo Portugues, Ben's ex-boyfriend
- Christina Simon as Elma Magtibay, Ben's neighbor and housekeeper next door, also Jim's former nanny
- Royce Cabrera as Roy, Ben's current boyfriend
- Vance Larena as Val, Jim's boss

== Episodes ==
=== Season 1 ===
No.	Title	Directed by	Written by	Original release date
1	"Love Returns"	Easy Ferrer	Easy Ferrer	October 15, 2020
Ben, a 23 year old guy who lives alone, is supposed to graduate from college after 8 years, but then the pandemic happens. As soon as the lockdown starts, he begins selling online to pay bills and prove his parents, who already reside in the US, that he can make it here alone. Then, he learns from his next door neighbor’s housekeeper that his childhood friend, who he had been harboring deep feelings for, will return to spend the lockdown. Suddenly, memories of old feelings return to him, making him anxious about how it’s going to be between them this time.
2	"Banter Banter"	Easy Ferrer	Easy Ferrer	October 22, 2020
After finally meeting his childhood friend Jim again, Ben try to reconnect with him, despite the obvious distance they now have. Worse, when Jim learns about Ben’s true self, he begins making his days uncomfortable for the latter. Is this the end of their friendship, or will Ben’s hidden feeling finally coke through?
3	"Getting Closer"	Easy Ferrer	Easy Ferrer	October 29, 2020
Just as about Leo is to bring a dark cloud to Ben’s life, Jim arrives and rescues him. This simple gesture leads to them reconnecting once again ang being comfortable to each other. Ben begins to hope for him and Jim to take everything to the next level. And then... the girlfriend arrives.
4	"The Third Party"	Easy Ferrer	Easy Ferrer	November 5, 2020
Things were going right for Ben and Jim, but then Yana, Jim’s girlfriend arrives. Ben is once again brushed to the side. As Ben watches Jim and Yana with jealous eyes, he feels he is running out of time to have the chance to be with Jim. Will he hastily jump into making a move, or will he finally decide to let Jim go and bury his own feelings?
5	"Jealous Moments"	Easy Ferrer	Easy Ferrer	November 12, 2020
The previous night was a very awkward moment, and it became obvious as there’s friction between Jim and Ben days after. They want to reconnect and talk, but it seems like to one has the courage to do so. Jim feels Ben is slowly moving away from him, and an unexpected gesture from Olan makes Jim realize that Ben could slip out of his hand any moment, something that he’s not ready for.
6	"Dark Night of the Soul"	Easy Ferrer	Easy Ferrer	November 19, 2020
Finally, Ben and Jim have told each other how they feel. This is not without all the complications and consequences. The moment of bliss between the two is to be cut short when all the outside forces come to haunt them; Jim’s relationship with Yana, Olan’s intention with Ben, Jim’s disapproving father, Leo’s return, and a dark painful secret lurking and just waiting to come out and haunt them.
7	"The Final Chase"	Easy Ferrer	Easy Ferrer	November 26, 2020
The complications are rising for Ben and Jim as they decide to be together. They test them to the brink, until finally, it seems it was time to let go. Will they be able to fight for their freedom to love, or will they give up to avoid more painful consequences.

== Development ==
=== Series 2 ===
On November 26, 2020, after the premiere of the Season 1 Finale, Teejay Marquez announced via his YouTube channel on the comment section of Episode 7 that the series will have its second season.

A second season for the series was announced on January 16 by Regal Entertainment. The official trailer for the second season was also released the same day in celebration for Regal Entertainment's Youtube Channel surpassing the 2 Million Subscriber mark. The actors from the first season, Teejay Marquez, Jerome Ponce, Sarah Edwards, Ron Angeles and Kat Galang, reprised their roles along with new cast members Vance Larena, Royce Cabrera, Ejay Jallorina, Miko Gallardo, Darwin Yu, Anika Dela Cruz, Jomari Angeles. The season is set to release on February 12, 2021.

== Release ==
=== Television ===
On September 8, GMA Network announced that it is set to bring the hit BL series ‘Ben X Jim’ starting September 26, 2021, through Heart of Asia Channel in Digital TV Box Nationwide.

== Reception ==
=== Viewership ===
YouTube views as of August 4, 2021:

Episode	Number of views
1: Love Returns	2,529,758
2: Banter Banter	1,991,725
3: Getting Closer	2,827,166
4: The Third Party	1,852,930
5: Jealous Moments	2,056,582
6: Dark Night of the Soul	1,829,944
7: The Final Chase	1,606,350

== Soundtrack ==
Song title	Performed by	Lyrics by	Music by	Release date	Platforms
"Stars Align"	Swavesound	Sam Marquez	Sam Marquez	October 15, 2020	Regal Entertainment

== See also ==
- Gameboys
- Hello Stranger
- Gaya Sa Pelikula
- Boys Lockdown
- Oh, Mando!
- The Boy Foretold by the Stars
