= Gaya sa Pelikula =

Philippine web series

- Promotional poster
- Genre: Romantic comedy; drama; boys' love
- Directed by: Jaime "JP" Habac Jr.
- Starring: Ian Pangilinan; Paolo Pangilinan
- Country of origin: Philippines
- Original languages: Filipino; English
- No. of seasons: 1
- No. of episodes: 8

Production
- Executive producer: Quark Henares
- Producers: Armi Rae Cacanindin; Kren Yap
- Cinematography: Dareen Baylon
- Editor: Kent Limbaga
- Running time: 21–36 minutes
- Production company: Globe Studios

Original release
- Network: YouTube
- Release: September 25 – November 20, 2020

Gaya sa Pelikula (lit. '"Like in the Movies"') is a 2020 Philippine web series starring Ian Pangilinan and Paolo Pangilinan. The series serves as a prequel to the unproduced Wattpad teleplays of the same name that features an architecture student who is forced to live with a cocky neighbor after a mishap makes it difficult for him to pay his bills.

Directed by Jaime "JP" Habac Jr. and produced by Globe Studios, the series premiered on YouTube on September 25, 2020, airing on Fridays at 8:00 PM PST. It ran until November 13, 2020, with a total of eight episodes.

== Synopsis ==
Karl (Paolo Pangilinan), a 19-year old introvert architecture student is in the middle of an identity crisis. Prior to the start of the second semester in college and forced by his parents, he moves into his uncle's condominium unit where he learns to be financially independent.

Karl then takes an online writing job to sustain his daily needs. While expecting the first payout for his work, his client suddenly goes missing in action, thereby making it difficult for him to pay for his monthly dues.

An opportunity presents itself when his cocky neighbor Vlad (Ian Pangilinan) has to hide from his family and proposes to share Karl's space for the rest of the semestral break in exchange of paying up his monthly rent.

== Cast and characters ==
Below are the cast of the series:

=== Main ===
- Ian Pangilinan as Jose Vladimir "Vlad" Austria
- Paolo Pangilinan as Karl Frederick "Archi" Almasen

=== Supporting ===
- Adrienne Vergara as Judit Austria, Vlad's older sister
- Che Ramos as Adelaida Almasen, Karl's mother
- Chrome Cosio as Mario Almasen, Karl's father
- Yesh Burce as Anna, Karl and Vlad’s neighbor
- Justine Peña as Sue Ching, Vlad’s best friend
- Franco Ramos as Santi Almasen, Karl’s uncle and Mario's brother

== Episodes ==
=== Season 1 (2020) ===
No.	Title	Directed by	Original release date
1	"Meet Cute"	Jaime "JP" Habac Jr.	September 25, 2020
In December 2018, 19-year-old architecture student Karl Frederik Almasen moves into his uncle Santi's former apartment as his parents want him to be independent. He becomes a film-themed freelance writer due to his cinephilia, but struggles to attract clients. One day, his neighbor, Jose Vladimir "Vlad" Austria, enters his apartment to hide from his sister Judit; assuming he is a burglar, Karl checks his pants, but Judit opens the door and assumes they are performing fellatio. Vlad then forges his relationship with Karl, stating he will not visit his mother until Judit accepts him. To make him feel comfortable, Vlad promises to Karl that he will help with his rent. End text: Babawiin natin ang ating kuwento. Maligayang simula! ("We will take back our story. To a happy beginning!")
2	"Deal"	Jaime "JP" Habac Jr.	October 2, 2020
Karl is uncomfortable with the forge; Vlad tells him to think of it as a gay-for-pay situation but is kicked out nonetheless. While at his apartment all alone, Karl begins falling in love towards Vlad. The next morning, Karl gives him shelter as he has no place to stay now. It is revealed that Karl is a closeted homosexual, expressing his sexuality through euphemisms, while Vlad is an open one. Karl is hired by a film review website to write search engine optimizations, and Vlad reveals he is in film school. Karl then asks him to be his housemate, saying he wants to transfer to film school as he aspires to do filmmaking. Vlad accepts. End text: Magbahagi tayo ng puwang sa walang mauwian. ("Let's make room for those who have lost their sense of home.")
3	"Cat and Dog"	Jaime "JP" Habac Jr.	October 9, 2020
Karl scolds Vlad for not cleaning the mess he made to the apartment, which turns into a quarrel. Judit apologizes, explaining that Vlad is not used to sharing rooms with other people. Karl then reassures that Vlad also cooks delicious breakfast, and that his passion for film is inspiring. Vlad also explains that he was moody due to rejection from a Japanese film laboratory. Karl accepts, and also apologizes for his attitude. End text: May lugar ka rito. ("You have a place here.")
4	"Time Away"	Jaime "JP" Habac Jr.	October 16, 2020
As Christmas nears, the Christian Karl decorates his apartment accordingly, but Vlad, whose birthday coincides with Christmas, reveals he does not believe in God though is comfortable with the decoration. While on a call with his friend, it is revealed that Vlad has feelings for Karl. While Karl spends Christmas at his parents' home, Vlad misses him immensely that he dances, imagining him and Karl kissing. The next day, Vlad awakens to the decor theme changed to a birthday one, with Karl back. End text: Kapag may itinuro sa 'yo ang pag-iisa, yakapin mo. ("When solitude teaches you something, embrace it.")
5	"Seeing the Light"	Jaime "JP" Habac Jr.	October 23, 2020
One day, a district-wide brownout commences. Karl and Vlad decide to spend the night together with neighbor Anna, also Vlad's friend since a teenager. They exploit the dark night by telling urban legends, then move to the gazebo to vent to each other; they learn that they were in Catholic schools. Karl and Vlad, feeling electric, dances and is about to kiss, when the power is back on. The closeted Karl rushes back to his apartment due to anxiety. End text: Habulin ang mga nawalang sandali. Ang lahat ng takot ay imbitasyon upang maging matapang. ("Make up for lost moments. Fears are pleads for braveness.")
6	"A Baring of Souls"	Jaime "JP" Habac Jr.	October 30, 2020
When Judit comes and reveals that Vlad's mother reserved a dinner with Karl and asked for his parents' address in an effort to know him more, Karl reveals the forge in a fit of anxiety. Furious, she takes Vlad away. Karl reveals to his parents he never has passion to architecture, a major his parents always wanted him to go to, infuriating them. After Vlad explains everything to her, Judit apologizes, additionally addressing her past homophobia. Karl pleads Vlad to come back as he misses him; Judit allows. While waiting for Vlad, Karl dances femininely, expressing his sexuality. Amid the dance, Vlad enters and joins Karl, who then kisses him. They spend the next day recounting their childhood and cuddling in bed. End text: Marapat ka sa pag-ibig na hahayaan kang magsayaw nang walang bahid ng takot at hiya. ("You are entitled to a love that lets you dance without fear nor shame.")
7	"The Dust We Swept Under"	Jaime "JP" Habac Jr.	November 6, 2020
Karl, Vlad, Anna, Judit, and Santi have a dinner at Karl's apartment. Santi talks to Vlad, while Judit can talk to Karl, on whether they are actually in love. Karl, overwhelmed with the discussion, goes to the gazebo and sees a screen playing a home movie of Karl, marking their one-month anniversary. Vlad approaches and they kiss, but Karl sees Anna, Judit, and Santi looking at them. Karl panics on the latter, but Vlad assures him that his uncle sensed his sexuality for a long time. Vlad is hurt on Karl for being in denial when he asks him to say that he is gay, equating his denial to criminals when interrogated. End text: Ikaw ang may pag-aari sa sarili mong katotohanan. ("You own the rights to your own truth.")
8	"The World Outside"	Jaime "JP" Habac Jr.	November 20, 2020
Vlad moves out of the apartment. Santi assures Karl that it takes time to be an open gay person. The next night, Vlad walks in the apartment drunk. He went to a bar due to stress, where he learned that his ex broke up with him for another man. When Vlad apologizes for forcing him to be open, Karl says "I'm gay", and Vlad congratulates him. Karl, however, says he is still not ready to say that in public; Vlad says he can take his time. While cuddling in bed, Karl says he wants to be with him forever. The next day, Anna suggests that he come to terms with his sexuality and spend his time to make the most out of it. End text: Mapagpalayang pag-ibig at pantay pantay na karapatan para sa ating lahat. Nasa labas ang totoong Laban, sasalubungin ka namin 'pag handa ka na. Hanggang sa muli. ("The real fight is on the outside. We will welcome you when you are ready. Until we meet again.")

=== Specials ===
No.	Title	Directed by	Original release date
1	"Dear Karl"	Jaime "JP" Habac Jr.	November 6, 2020
The full version of the home movie seen in "The Dust We Swept Under", featuring Vlad secretly filming Karl while sharing moments together. Vlad narrates, wishing him luck on his filmmaking career and expressing love for him: "The last month felt like getting drawn into a screen, a film I wasn’t meant to be in, one I could’ve easily been written out of; thank you for writing me in. It’s been swell. See you outside, please. We deserve it. Don’t you think?" This also serves as a music video to "Ikaw (Lo-Fi Version)" by musician Abraham.

== Production ==
=== Development ===
With Globe Studios producing the web series, they said that it was inspired with the success of 2gether: The Series, a Thai television series, and other similar Asian boys' love content. It also aimed on having "more gay stories told by gay people" as it advocates for LGBTQ+ media representation. A preview of the series' opening scene was released on Wattpad on April 20, 2020.

In a tweet from the series' official Twitter account on June 27, 2020, Jaime "JP" Habac Jr. was named as its director. Habac is notable for directing I'm Drunk, I Love You, a 2017 romantic comedy independent film.

Its teaser was released on September 4, 2020, on YouTube featuring lead actors Paolo Pangilinan and Ian Pangilinan. The series is Paolo's first acting role and Ian's first lead role on screen.

On November 13, Globe Studios postponed the release of the finale and e-fan meet to November 20 to gather support for those affected by Typhoon Ulysses.

=== Music ===
The soundtrack of the series was released by the official Globe Studios playlist on Spotify and platforms on Facebook and YouTube.

No.	Title	Original artist	Length
1.	"Unti-Unti"	UDD	04:43
2.	"tyl"	Kakie Pangilinan	03:12
3.	"Selos"	the vowels they orbit	03:55
4.	"Tahanan"	Nica Del Rosario	06:07
5.	"Nasa'n Ka, Oh Luna?"	MarsMango	04:45
6.	"Magkaibigan o Magka-Ibigan"	Coeli	05:50
7.	"tyl (acoustic version)"	Kakie Pangilinan	02:53
8.	"Ride Home"	Ben&Ben	05:26
9.	"Ikaw (cover by Abraham) (Note: Abraham's version is a cover posted on his Facebook account on August 2, 2020.)"	Mula sa Buwan feat. Nicco Manalo (Note: Performed alternately by Nicco Manalo and Boo Gabunada as Cyrano from Black Box Productions' musical play, Mula sa Buwan, held at the Irwin Lee Theatre, Ateneo de Manila University, Loyola Heights, Quezon City on December 2–4, 2016.) (Note: Originally recorded by Nicco Manalo from the album "Mula sa Buwan" released in 2017.)	03:02
10.	"Fools"	Nathan & Mercury	04:58
11.	"Kilometer Zero"	Ian Pangilinan	04:38
12.	"Kung Alam Mo Lang"	Zsaris	04:17
13.	"Tulog Na Mahal Ko"	Jai.	04:17

== Release ==
=== YouTube ===
The teaser was released on September 4, 2020. On September 28, 2020, the official trailer was released on YouTube.

The first episode, "Meet Cute", premiered on YouTube on September 25, 2020, at 8:00 PM (Philippine Standard Time).

=== Netflix ===
The series was released on Netflix in Southeast Asia, Hong Kong, and Taiwan on January 7, 2021.

== Reception ==
The web series' first episode was released on September 25, 2020. Since then, it has garnered more than 16.3 million total views as of May 22, 2022.

On being compared with other locally produced boys' love series such as Gameboys and Hello Stranger, Habac dismissed that they were "competing with any other BL series" but instead are delighted with its rise as they want to normalize LGBTQIA+ relationships in society by letting the viewers feel that being gay is okay.

YouTube views as of April 26, 2026:

Episode	Number of views
1. Meet Cute	3.8M
2. Deal	2.4M
3. Cat and Dog	2.3M
4. Time Away	2.2M
5. Seeing the Light	2.3M
6. A Baring of Souls	2.5M
7. The Dust We Swept Under	2.7M
8. The World Outside	2.2M

=== It's Showtime guesting ===
On November 9, 2020, lead actors Ian Pangilinan and Paolo Pangilinan appeared as guests in "Mas Testing", a segment of the noontime variety show It's Showtime. The segment features a "tumpak tracer" (lit. 'accurate tracer') who needs to "correctly guess which between the two PUT or 'persons under testing' fits a description or does a challenge better." However, the questions asked by hosts Vice Ganda, Vhong Navarro and Jhong Hilario drew flak from netizens as the lead actors were asked on who was more straight, "tigasin" (lit. 'tough'), "magaling magpalabas" (lit. 'good in releasing') and "kulot" (lit. 'curly'). This prompted netizens on Twitter to highlight the importance of sexual orientation, gender identity, and gender expression awareness and education.

== See also ==
- Gameboys
- Hello Stranger
- Ben X Jim
- Boys Lockdown
- Oh, Mando!
- The Boy Foretold by the Stars
