= Asian Academy Creative Award for Best Drama Series =

Award for outstanding television drama series

- Awarded for: Best drama series
- Country: Asia–Pacific region
- Presented by: Asian Academy Creative Awards
- First award: 2018
- Currently held by: Doctor Climax (2024)
- Website: asianacademycreativeawards.com

This is a list of the winners of the Asian Academy Creative Award for Best Drama Series since its institution in 2018. Apart from the main award, the category is also awarded regionally in seventeen participating nations.

South Korea holds the most awards with four wins, followed by India and Japan with one.

== Winners ==
The following table display the winners of the award.

Year	Program	Network	Country	Ref.
2018	Miss Sherlock	Hulu Japan	Japan	
2019	Delhi Crime	Netflix	India	
2020	Crash Landing on You	tvN	South Korea	
2021	Move to Heaven	Netflix	South Korea	
2022	Twenty-Five Twenty-One	tvN	South Korea	
2023	The Glory	Netflix	South Korea	
2024	Doctor Climax	Netflix	Thailand	

=== Regional winners ===
The following table display the winners of the regional award, sorted by the participating nations.

==== Australia and New Zealand ====
Year	Program	Network
2018	A Place to Call Home	Showcase
2019	Wentworth	Showcase
2020	Mystery Road	ABC
2021	Hungry Ghosts	SBS
2022	The Secrets She Keeps	Paramount+
2023	Safe Home	SBS
2024	Boy Swallows Universe	Netflix

==== Bangladesh ====
Year	Program	Network
2022	Jaago Bahey	Chorki
2023	Karagar	Hoichoi

==== Cambodia ====
Year	Program	Network
2023	Weight of Love	Sastra

==== China ====
Year	Program	Network
2018	Burning Ice	IQIYI
2019	The Rise of Phoenixes	Hunan Television
2021	Humans	IQIYI
2022	The Ideal City	IQIYI
2023	Love Between Fairy and Devil	IQIYI

==== Hong Kong ====
Year	Program	Network
2018	短暫的婚姻 – My Very Short Marriage	ViuTV
2019	The Trading Floor	Star Chinese Movies
2020	Leap Day	ViuTV
2021	Ink at Tai Ping	ViuTV
2022	Kids' Lives Matter	TVB
2023	Rope a Dope	ViuTV

==== India ====
Year	Program	Network
2018	Sacred Games	Netflix
2019	Delhi Crime	Netflix
2020	The Family Man	Amazon Prime Video
2021	Scam 1992	SonyLIV
2022	Suzhal: The Vortex	Amazon Prime Video
2023	Trial by Fire	Netflix

==== Indonesia ====
Year	Program	Network
2018	The Publicist	Viu
2019	Grisse	HBO Asia
2020	Pretty Little Liars	Viu
2021	Maya's World	Vision+
2022	Wedding Agreement the Series	Disney+ Hotstar
2023	Heart Broken	SCTV
2024	Must Get Married	WeTV

==== Japan ====
Year	Program	Network
2018	Miss Sherlock	Hulu Japan
2021	The Naked Director	Netflix
2022	Don't Call It Mystery	Fuji Television
2023	Rebooting	Nippon TV
2024	Antihero	TBS

==== Malaysia ====
Year	Program	Network
2018	Do[s]a	Astro
2019	The Bridge	Viu
2020	The Bridge	Viu
2021	Project: Anchor SPM	Astro
2022	Ganjil	Viu
2023	One Cent Thief	Astro

==== Myanmar ====
Year	Program	Network
2020	Lake Pyar	Canal+
2022	Trapped	Canal+
2023	Crying Forest	Canal+

==== Philippines ====
Year	Program	Network
2018	The Greatest Love	ABS-CBN
2019	Barangay 143	GMA Network
2020	A Soldier's Heart	ABS-CBN
2021	Niña Niño	TV5
2022	On the Job	HBO Go
2023	Cattleya Killer	Amazon Prime Video

==== Singapore ====
Year	Program	Network
2018	The Teenage Psychic	HBO Asia
2019	From Beijing to Moscow	Toggle
2020	Mind's Eye	meWatch
2021	Mind Jumper	meWatch
2022	This Land Is Mine	meWatch
2023	Oppa, Saranghae!	Channel 8

==== South Korea ====
Year	Program	Network
2018	The Emperor: Owner of the Mask	MBC TV
2019	Hotel del Luna	tvN
2020	Crash Landing on You	tvN
2021	Move to Heaven	Netflix
2022	Twenty-Five Twenty-One	tvN
2023	The Glory	Netflix
2024	The Atypical Family	JTBC

==== Taiwan ====
Year	Program	Network
2018	Wake Up	PTS
2019	The World Between Us	PTS
2020	The Victims' Game	Netflix
2021	Mother To Be	Sanlih E-Television
2022	Light the Night	Netflix
2023	Wave Makers	Netflix

==== Thailand ====
Year	Program	Network
2019	Krong Kam	Channel 3
2020	Who Are You	GMMTV
2021	Girl from Nowhere	Netflix
2022	Wannabe	Viu
2023	Good Old Days	GMMTV

==== Vietnam ====
Year	Program	Network
2022	Scarlet Hill	K+
