= Boys' Lockdown =

Philippine web series

- Promotional poster
- Genre: Romance; Drama; Boys' love
- Created by: Danice Mae P. Sison
- Written by: Danice Mae P. Sison
- Directed by: Jade Castro
- Starring: Alec Kevin Ali King
- Music by: Teresa Barrozo
- Country of origin: Philippines
- Original languages: Tagalog (Filipino); English; Ilocano language
- No. of seasons: 2
- No. of episodes: 6

Production
- Executive producer: Atty. Darwin Mariano
- Production location: Philippines
- Cinematography: Tey Clamor
- Editors: Jeremiah Domingo; Nicolai Navarro
- Running time: 21-34 minutes
- Production company: Ticket2Me Bit by Bit Company

Original release
- Network: Ticket2Me (Advance Screening); YouTube; Heart of Asia Channel
- Release: October 18 – November 29, 2020

Boys' Lockdown is a 2020 Philippine Boy's Love web series produced by Atty. Darwin Mariano of Bit by Bit Development Company (Ticket2Me). Originally written by Danice Mae P. Sison as an eight-episode series, it was reduced to six due to limited production resources during the COVID-19 pandemic.

The official trailer was released on October 1, 2020, while the first episode premiered on the Ticket2Me video platform exactly two weeks later at 8:00PM Philippine Standard Time and on Ticket2Me YouTube channel the following Sunday night. The series also premiered on Heart of Asia Channel on April 11, 2021, 11:00PM Philippine Standard Time.

== Synopsis ==
Love in the time of a pandemic. While it’s certainly not the best time to go out, meet someone and fall in love, Key and Chen find each other in the middle of the enhanced community quarantine and connect in ways that surprise them both. As they get to know each other despite the restrictions, challenges and even dangers stemming from the pandemic, something very special starts to blossom between them. In a time when we’re forced to keep apart from each other, does love have the power to connect us?

== Cast and characters ==
=== Main ===
- Ali King (Alonzo Raphael Elequin) as Key Kalunsod, an introvert college student stuck in Metro Manila while his parents reside in their hometown of Baguio.
- Alec Kevin (Alec Kevin Rigonan) as Chen "Chennie" Chavez, popularly known online as "CCStrng"

=== Supporting ===
- Teetin Villanueva as Olive "Libby" Chavez, Chen's older sister (Ate, Ats)
- Kaloy Tingcungco as Martin "Marts" Ilagan, Key's friend
- Crystal Paras as Devorha "Dev" Mapile, Key's ex-girlfriend
- Ivoy Colo as Whilce, Security Officer at Key's dorm
- Luis Padilla as Dicky, Community Volunteer at Chen and Olive's subdivision
- Laksa, Chavez's family dog

=== Guest ===
- Macoy Dubs as Auntie Julie (Ep. 1)
- Meann Espinosa as Drugstore Cashier (Ep. 1)
- Jhon Leo Hilario as Mineral Water Seller (Ep. 2)

== Episodes ==
No.	Title	Directed by	Written by	Original release date
1	"Essential Errands"	Jade Castro	Danice Mae P. Sison	October 18, 2020
2	"Contact Tracing"	Jade Castro	Danice Mae P. Sison	October 25, 2020
3	"Ayuda One?"	Jade Castro	Danice Mae P. Sison	November 1, 2020
4	"One Meter Apart!"	Jade Castro	Danice Mae P. Sison	November 8, 2020
5	"Community Spread"	Jade Castro	Danice Mae P. Sison	November 22, 2020
6	"Finale: Podmates"	Jade Castro	Danice Mae P. Sison	November 29, 2020

=== Specials ===
On December 1, Ticket2Me YouTube channel released a trailer entitled "The Making of #BoysLockdown Coming Soon!"

No.	Title	Directed by	Written by	Original release date
1	TBA	Jade Castro Jr.	Danice Mae P. Sison	TBA

== Production ==
=== Development ===
Boys Lockdown is the project of Bit By Bit Development Company (Ticket2Me) Founder and Executive Producer Darwin Mariano who was inspired to create his own BL series after the success of 2gether: The series. He assembled a creative team in April 2020 to persuade Director Jade Castro to onboard and six months later, the first episode premiered.

He also shared that the Boy's Love genre helped him find happiness during what was a terrible time for his family and the rest of the world.

On November 12 due to Typhoon Ulysses that hit Metro Manila and many parts of Luzon, many in the post production team have been without power/internet the night before. Boys' Lockdown Executive Producer and Ticket2Me Founder-CEO Atty. Darwin Mariano decided to move Episode 5 release to November 19 to ensure his team can attend to their loved ones and stay safe as they complete their work for the episode. On the same day, Mariano organized a live YouTube broadcast for Bangon Luzon (Typhoon Relief) to call for donations to help those affected by the typhoons.

=== Casting ===
Olive and Libby were originally drafted as two separate roles (Mom and younger sister of Chen respectively), but were later combined as just an older sister due to quarantine restrictions to cast for a teenager role.

== Reception ==
=== Viewership ===
YouTube views as of December 7, 2020:

Episode	Number of views
Essential Errands Part 1 of 2	722,496
Essential Errands Part 2 of 2	568,287
Contact Tracing Part 1 of 2	461,281
Contact Tracing Part 2 of 2	404,960
Ayuda One? Part 1 of 2	440,282
Ayuda One? Part 2 of 2	386,944
One Meter Apart! Part 1 of 2	390,658
One Meter Apart! Part 2 of 2	395,719
Community Spread Part 1 of 2	392,305
Community Spread Part 2 of 2	345,853
Finale: Podmates Part 1 of 2	310,908
Finale: Podmates Part 2 of 2	324,224

== Music ==
Song title	Artist	Lyrics by	Music by	Album	Year	Episode	Recording Studio	Ref.
"Home"	Reese Lansangan	Maria Therese Esteban Lansangan	Maria Therese Esteban Lansangan	Home	October 29, 2016	Main theme	Soon The Moon	

== Future ==
The statement "Key and Chen will return." was shown at the end of Episode 6 (Finale)'s second part video, formally signaling a second season.

A teaser video for season two, called "Love Team: Beyond Boys' Lockdown" premiered on the Ticket2Me youtube channel on November 28, 2021, with a full cast published on May 28, 2022.

== See also ==
- Gameboys
- Hello Stranger
- Gaya Sa Pelikula
- Ben X Jim
- Oh, Mando!
