= Fuccbois =

2019 film

- Release poster
- Directed by: Eduardo Roy Jr.
- Written by: Eduardo Roy Jr.
- Produced by: Ferdinand Lapuz
- Starring: Kokoy de Santos; Royce Cabrera; Ricky Davao
- Cinematography: Albert Banzon
- Edited by: Carlo F. Manatad
- Music by: Andrew Florentino
- Production companies: Cinemalaya Foundation; Found Films; Frontrow Entertainment
- Distributed by: Solar Pictures
- Release date: August 3, 2019
- Running time: 96 minutes

Fuccbois, also referred to as F#*@bois, is a 2019 Philippine LGBT film written and directed by Eduardo Roy Jr. in his final directorial effort before he died in 2022. Starring Kokoy de Santos, Royce Cabrera, and Ricky Davao, the story follows Ace and Miko, two aspiring actors who also compete in swimsuit competitions. The film was played at the 2019 Cinemalaya Philippine Independent Film Festival.

== Synopsis ==
Ace Policarpio and Miko Ramos are Instagram celebrities who want to become actors. They both work as models for gay bars, entering the bars' bikini pageants. In the film's second half, an unknown man who goes under the pseudonym "Brithanygaile" invites the two to a private resort in a secluded island, threatening to leak a sex video of them onto the Internet if they do not comply. Afraid that their reputation will be permanently tarnished if the video spreads, Ace and Miko come to the resort to meet Brithanygaile (who turns out to be the powerful mayor of a local town) with plans to delete the video from his phone. At the resort, the three partake in recreational drugs and have sex. The mayor then requests Miko and Ace to have sex while being recorded, they try to stop him but are threatened. After the mayor falls asleep, Miko wakes Ace and takes the mayor’s phone and tries to delete the video. The mayor wakes up, sees Miko trying to delete the video and tries to choke Miko to death. Ace stabs the mayor in the shoulder, badly injuring him. Then he stabs the mayor to death, leaving the boys frozen. They then put the mayor into bed and clean the blood stains in a shower. The next morning, they leave the villa by boat with the mayor’s employees and bare are discovered as the murderers. They try to run but are caught and tied inside a car driving them away. Ace uses his penknife to cut the rope, and choke the driver into unconciousness. He unties Miko and the two run into a forest before the driver awakes. The boys are trapped in the forest and Miko is told on the phone, that he has been cast in a television show.

== Reception, critical response and thematic analysis ==
Critics found the power dynamics between the mayor and the two boys fascinating, and some of them thought that the film became more interesting upon the introduction of Brithanygaile. Fred Hawson (ABS-CBN) and Fidel Antonio Medel (Philippine Entertainment Portal) appreciated how the second half of the film ventured into suspenseful thriller. According to Oggs Cruz (Rappler) and Vianca Catibog (Philippine Daily Inquirer), the power struggles were one of the most compelling elements of the film, if not the most. Catibog further praised Fuccbois for its exploration of the male pageantry scene in the Philippines, as well as how youths' pursuit of online fame and societal acceptance can force them into dangerous and life-threatening situations orchestrated by abusive people in positions of authority.

Cruz and Medel said that the power dynamics in question were more nuanced than expected in that both sides of the relationship hold some degree of power over the other. Medel posed the question of who held the greater amount of power: "Is it the mayor who, in his own words, is Ace's lap dog? Or is it Ace and Miko who can seemingly get away with anything just because they are hot? Everyone is culpable to a certain degree. And that's when things get really murky." Meanwhile, Cruz cited how the film takes place during election time, which entails that the mayor's position of authority could be compromised if Ace and Miko speak up about their troubles.

Catibog and Hawson also directed praise towards the performances. Catibog called Davao "the very soul of this film" and said that he portrayed the mayor's "unpredictable mind" well; Hawson thought that Davao was successful in delivering a "crazy, unhinged, scary, over-the-top" personality and said that "that lecherous smile on his face sent all sorts of sick disgusting shivers going up and down my spine." Hawson also wrote that Cabrera and de Santos's performances were good for their first lead roles—in his view, despite the flawed nature of Ace and Miko, the two actors successfully captured the right amount of vulnerability to make audiences empathize with the characters' motivations and hope for them to succeed in preventing the video from ever being posted.

In a review of another 2019 Cinemalaya film, Edward, ANCX critic Andrew Paredes wrote that Fuccbois was a film that "wallowed in the hopelessness of their characters' plights so effectively that they trod that delicate line between portraying reality and reinforcing it". Meanwhile, Cruz thought Fuccbois deviated from Roy's other works in that instead of focusing on marginalized sectors of the population who have everything to lose, the film revolves around well-off people who can afford things like designer clothes. He called Ace and Miko "fame whores", always obsessed with getting attention "even if it is for the most banal of reasons", though he liked Roy's "scathing and empowering" portrayal of them as part of a shallow generation nonetheless capable of toppling authority.

=== Accolades ===
When the film was shown at the Cinemalaya Philippine Independent Film Festival in 2019, Fuccbois garnered multiple awards. Eduardo Roy Jr. was given the award for Best Director, his second such win at that film festival; the other was for Pamilya Ordinario. Davao won Best Supporting Actor. It was his first Cinemalaya award, and he described the win as "priceless". He also won another award of the same name at the 2020 Filipino Academy of Movie Arts and Sciences Awards.
