= Teejay Marquez =

Filipino actor, dancer, television personality, and commercial model

Teejay Madrilejo
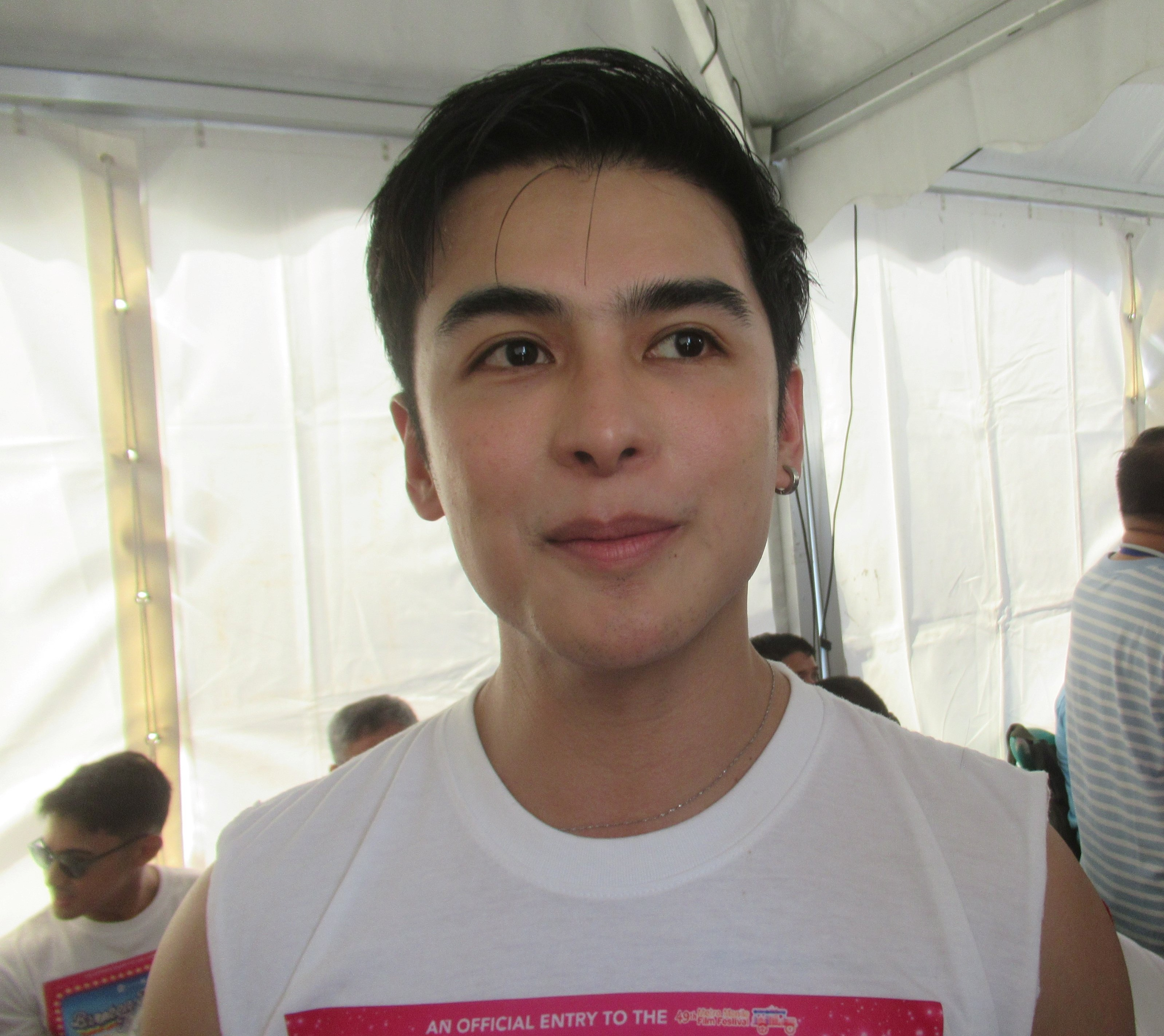
- Marquez in 2023
- Born: Teejay Madrilejo; September 29, 1993 (age 33); Quezon City, Philippines
- Occupations: Actor, host, singer, model, dancer, endorser, vlogger
- Years active: 2009–present

Teejay Madrilejo, popularly known as Teejay Marquez, is a Filipino actor, dancer, television personality, and commercial model under contract with Regal Entertainment's talent management arm, ALV Talent Circuit. He is best known for his leading roles in the boys love series Ben X Jim.

== Filmography ==
=== Film ===
Year	Title	Role
2009	Ang Tanging Pamilya (A Marry-Go-Round!)	Gerald Sicat
2013	Pagari (Mohammad Abdullah)	Mohammad
2014	Basement	Ryan
2014	Marka	Carlo Del Rio
2016	Dubsmash	Teejay
2019	Hellcome Home	Fred Domingo
2023	Broken Hearts Trip	Contestant
2024	G! LU	Raymond
2024	Mamay: A Journey to Greatness	Young Marcos Mamay

=== Television ===
Year	Title	Role
2010–2012	Reel Love Presents: Tween Hearts	Nathaniel Antonio "Nathan" Dimagalpok
2011–2014	Walang Tulugan with the Master Showman	Himself / Co-host
2011–2012	Ikaw Lang ang Mamahalin	Victor
2011	Time of My Life	Chicho
2011–2012	Tween Hearts	Nathan
2012–2013	Party Pilipinas	Himself / Performer
2013	Pyra: Babaeng Apoy	Beto
2013	Anna Karenina	Benjie
2013	Magpakailanman: Pakawalang anghel	Allan
2013	Home Sweet Home	Coco Buena
2014	Paraiso Ko'y Ikaw	Brian
2014	Magpakailanman: Barangay Cybersex	Georgie
2014	Magpakailanman: Pabrika ng bata	Ronnel
2014	Seasons of Love: My Soulmate, My Soulhate	Ian
2015	Maynila: Moments In Time	N/A
2015	Dream Dad	Jake Sta. Maria
2015	LolaBasyang.com: Ang Kudyaping Enkantado	Pabling
2016	The Greatest Love	Teenage Andrei Alegre
2016	ASAP	Himself / Guest performer
2016	Rumpi	Himself / Guest
2016	Gen Z	Himself / Guest
2016	Hitam Putih	Himself / Guest
2016	Ini Talkshow	Himself / Guest
2016	Girls Night Out	Himself / Guest
2016	Katakan Putus	Himself / Guest
2017–2018	Siapa Takut Jatuh Cinta	Sean Adijaya
2019	Maalaala Mo Kaya: Lotion	Alex Berth
2020	Ben X Jim	Ben Mendoza
2021	Ben X Jim Forever	Ben Mendoza
2022	Mano Po Legacy: Her Big Boss	Raven Lim (first antagonist role)
2022	Suntok sa Buwan	Carlton Saavedra
2024	Makiling	Oliver Vergel (second antagonist role)
2024	Wish Ko Lang: Sayang na Ganda	Boyet (antagonist)
2025	Sanggang-Dikit FR	Francis

== Awards ==
- 2011 PMPC Star Awards for Television's "Best Male New TV Personality" for Tween Hearts (tied with his co-star/nominee Derrick Monasterio)
