= Adrianna So =

Filipino actress (born 1992)

- Born: Malak So Shdifat; May 7, 1992 (age 34); Zarqa, Jordan
- Citizenship: Philippines
- Education: La Consolacion College Manila
- Occupation: Actress
- Years active: 2012–present
- Agents: Talent5 (2012–2017); The IdeaFirst Company (2017–present)
- Known for: Pearl in Gameboys

Adrianna So (born Malak So Shdifat, May 7, 1992) is a Filipino actress known for her role as Pearl on the web series Gameboys (2020) and its 2021 film adaptation.

== Personal life ==
So was born Malak So Shdifat in Zarqa governorate, Jordan and moved to the Philippines at age five.

She attended high school at Hijas De Jesus and graduated at La Consolacion College, Manila with a Mass Communications degree, major in Advertising.

== Career ==
So started her television career in 2012 when she joined TV5's now-defunct reality show Artista Academy. She became part of the Final 6 and went on to appear in various drama series on TV5. In 2017, she signed with The IdeaFirst Company and changed her screen name to Adrianna So, stating that it is close to her heart. In 2020, she was cast as quirky and supportive Pearl Gatdula in the Filipino Boys' Love (BL) web series Gameboys starring Kokoy De Santos and Elijah Canlas.

== Filmography ==
=== Series ===
Year	Title	Role	Type	Ref.
2022	#PaThirsty	Pearl Gatdula	Main Role	
2022	Gameboys 2	Pearl Gatdula	Support Role	
2021	The Sexth Sense	Adrianna	Co-Host	
2021	Love Vs. Stars	Era	Support Role	
2021	Paano ang Pangako?	Andi	Supporting Role / Antagonist	
2020	Pearl Next Door	Pearl Gatdula	Main Role	
2020	Gameboys	Pearl Gatdula	Support Role	
2020	I Am U	Grace	Support Role	
2018	AMO	Michelle	Support Role	
2016	#ParangNormal Activity	Samantha	Main Role	
2016	Forever Sucks	Sasha	Main Role	
2016	Tasya Fantasya	Leina	Support Role	
2015	The Baker King	Celine Lee	Support Role	
2015	Wattpad Presents: I’m in love with a Dota Player	Alyssa	Support Role	
2014	Wattpad Presents: DyepNi	Janine	Main Role	
2013–14	Madam Chairman	Clarisse	Support Role	
2013	Misibis Bay	Didi	Main Role	
2013	Never Say Goodbye	Valerie	Main Role	
2012	Enchanted Garden: Paraiso sa Eden	Lucy	Main Role	

=== Film ===
Year	Title	Role	Notes	Notes
2023	Ten Little Mistresses	Because		
2021	Gameboys: The Movie	Pearl Gatdula		
2019	Love Is Love		Supporting role	
2018	Die Beautiful	Migs' girlfriend	Credited as Malak So	
2018	Ang Babaeng Allergic sa WiFi (The Girl Allergic to WiFi)	Margaux		
2018	Distance		Supporting role	

== Awards and nominations ==
Award ceremony	Year	Category	Nominee(s)/work(s)	Result	Ref.
Seattle Film Festival	2021	Best Actress - TV/Web Series	"Pearl Next Door"	Nominated	
