= Ian Pangilinan =

Filipino actor (born 1997)

- Born: September 9, 1997 (age 29); Mandaluyong, Philippines
- Education: Ateneo de Manila University
- Occupation: Actor
- Years active: 2020–present
- Agent: Cornerstone

Ian Pangilinan (born September 9, 1997) is a Filipino actor and theater performer known for his roles in film, television, and stage productions.

== Career ==
On 2021, he starred as Pol on Niña Niño.

On 2022, he guested on GMA's drama series, Nakarehas na Puso, Royal Blood, and Family Feud PH.

Pangilinan made his directorial debut with Patay Gutom (co-directed with Carl Papa), which premiered at the 2026 CinePanalo Film Festival.

== Filmography ==
=== Film ===
| Year | Title | Role | Notes | Ref. |
|---|---|---|---|---|
| 2022 | Family Matters | Francis | 48th Metro Manila Film Festival entry | |
| 2023 | Five Breakups and a Romance | George | | |
| 2026 | The Loved One | Edward | | |
| 2026 | Patay Gutom | Tristan | 3rd Puregold CinePanalo Film Festival | |

=== Television ===
| Year | Title | Role | Notes | Ref. |
|---|---|---|---|---|
| 2020 | Gaya Sa Pelikula | Vlad | Digital series | |
| 2021 | Niña Niño | Pol | Episodes 6-70, 97-99 | |
| 2022 | Love in 40 Days | Jeff | | |
| 2022 | K-Love | Luis | | |
| 2023 | Nakarehas na Puso | PDEA Agent | Uncredited | |
| 2023 | Royal Blood | Henchman | Uncredited | |

=== Theater ===
| Year | Production | Role | Location | Ref. |
|---|---|---|---|---|
| 2018 | Rent | Roger Davis | Ateneo Blue Repertory | |
| 2019 | Spring Awakening | Melchior | Hyundai Hall, Areté | |
| 2019 | Reasons to be Pretty | Greg | Fine Arts Theater (Gonzaga Building) | |
| 2020 | Tabing Ilog | Rovic | Dolphy Theater | |
| 2024 | Rent | Mark Cohen | 9 Works Theatrical | |
| 2024 | Bar Boys: The Musical | Chris Abueva (Note: Pangilinan is the cover for the role in the 2025 rerun.) | Power Mac Center Spotlight Blackbox Theater | |
| 2025 | Bar Boys: The Musical | Chris Abueva | Hyundai Hall, Areté | |

== Awards and nominations ==
| Award | Year | Category | Nominated work | Result | Ref. |
|---|---|---|---|---|---|
| PMPC Star Awards for Movies | 2024 | New Movie Actor of the Year | Family Matters | Nominated | |
| PMPC Star Awards for Movies | 2024 | Movie Ensemble Acting of the Year | Family Matters | Won | |
