= Niña Niño =

Philippine drama television series

- Title poster
- Genre: Family drama; Slice of life; Comedy
- Created by: Thop Nazareno; John Bedia
- Written by: John Bedia; Lawrence Nicodemus
- Directed by: Thop Nazareno
- Starring: Maja Salvador; Noel Comia Jr.
- Opening theme: "Lapit" by Zephanie Dimaranan
- Composer: Yeng Constantino
- Country of origin: Philippines
- Original language: Filipino
- No. of episodes: 202 (list of episodes)

Production
- Executive producers: Robert P. Galang; Erickson Raymundo; Jeff Vadillo
- Producers: Sienna Olaso; Isabel Santillan; Monika Aira Zafra
- Production location: Dolores, Quezon
- Camera setup: Multiple-camera
- Running time: 45-60 minutes
- Production companies: Spring Films; Cignal Entertainment; Cornerstone Studios

Original release
- Network: TV5
- Release: April 5, 2021 – May 19, 2022

Related
- Ang Himala ni Niño

Niña Niño is a Philippine drama television series broadcast by TV5. Directed by Thop Nazareno, it stars Maja Salvador and Noel Comia Jr. in the title roles. It premiered on April 5, 2021 on the network's TodoMax Primetime Singko line up. The series concluded on May 19, 2022 with a total of 202 episodes.

A spin-off titled Ang Himala ni Niño premiered in September 2024.

== Plot ==
In the first story, Niña (Maja Salvador) was a girl who does not believe in miracles. She thrived somebody's essentials to benefit her and her Lola Belen (Ruby Ruiz) who was born to Gloria (Lilet) then left for a reason due to poor living. After eight years, she returned to Brgy. Consolacion along with his second child Niño (Noel Comia Jr.). Gloria revealed she was beaten by her own husband and she is trying to get away. After sunset, Lola Belen went missing after long hunting despite that she had died in a collision. Meanwhile, in Belen's demise in the family, they are convinced to start acting as con-artist for their potential income to the siblings, after when Niño had a stomachache, Niña had caught by the tanods of the stealing property and both were run out quickly and they jump on a truck which brings them to Sitio Santa Ynez where they live a new life until an unexpected event changes everything.

While Niña and Niño escaped through the remote area of Sta. Ynez, they had to find ways in receiving true faith for themselves and connected to healing rituals while they found Ka Iking, they had discovered happy thoughts for earning big income and return on the basic act. This little town was ruled by Kapitana Pinang (Dudz Teraña) who was very strict and interested in making more and more money. Later on, they met Kagawad Isay (Moi Bien), who initially lets them stay in her house, until a disagreement between Nina and Isay's brother forced them to leave, but Isay gave them the empty lot she owns as a place to build their house.

Niño meanwhile, acquired healing powers after being accidentally slipped on the brook, hitting his head on a rock. He lays in coma, until he woke up, seemingly acquired the ability to heal sickness and illnesses, becoming a faith healer on the barangay.

On the sequel, the siblings return to Santa Ynez after leaving once again for Manila. They are now more stable as siblings, and they had to face the same situations as they were there once before.

On the spin-off Ang Himala ni Niño, a young Niño gets his abilities awakened earlier.

== Cast and characters ==
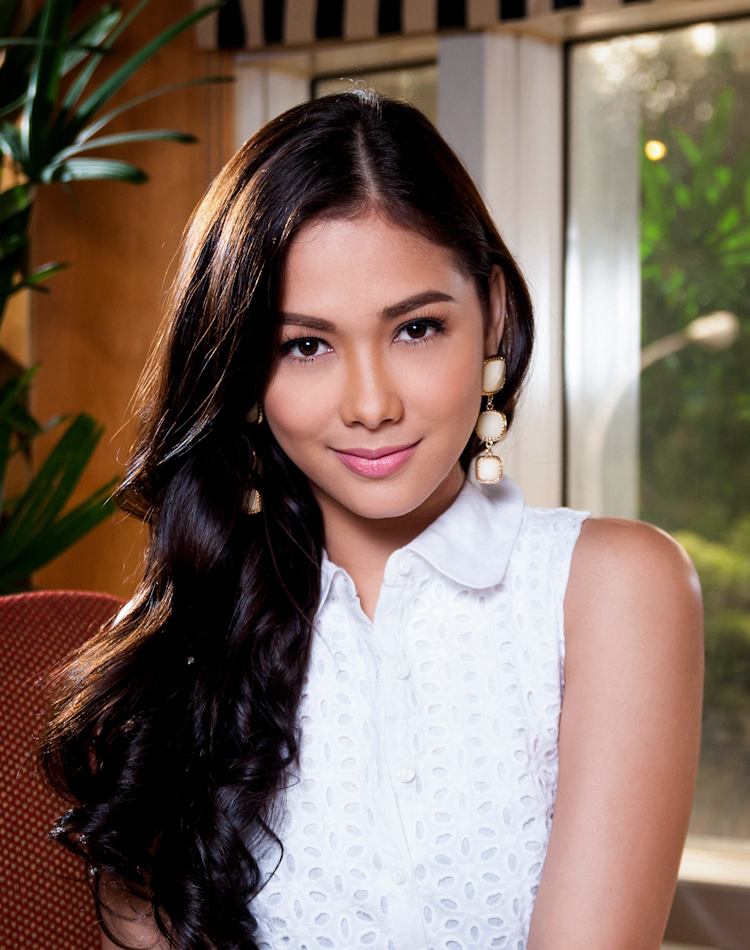
Maja Salvador

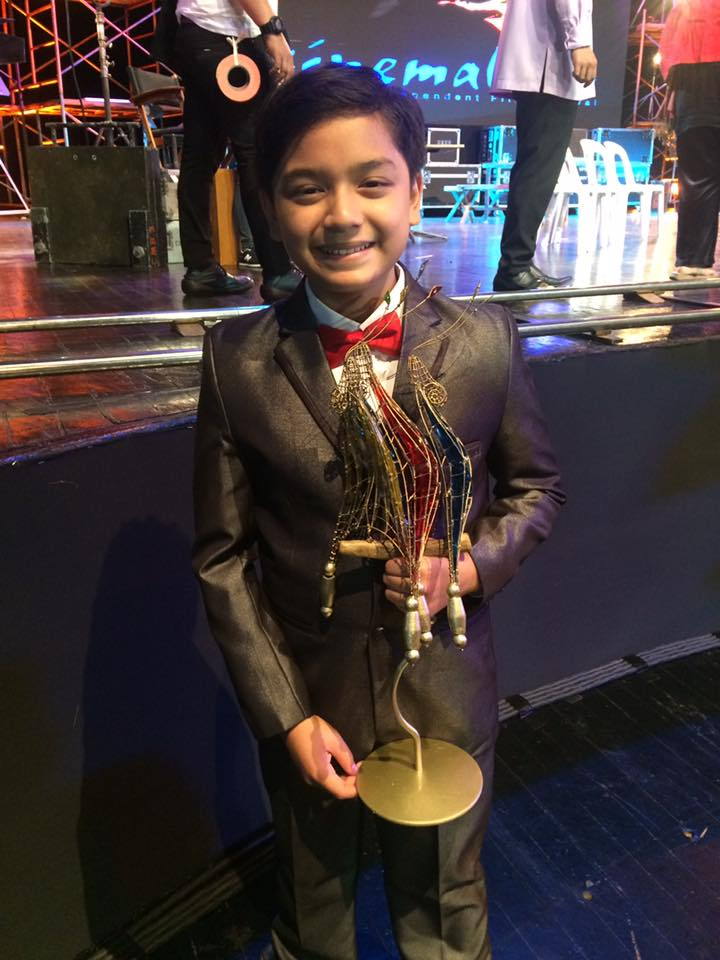
Noel Comia Jr.

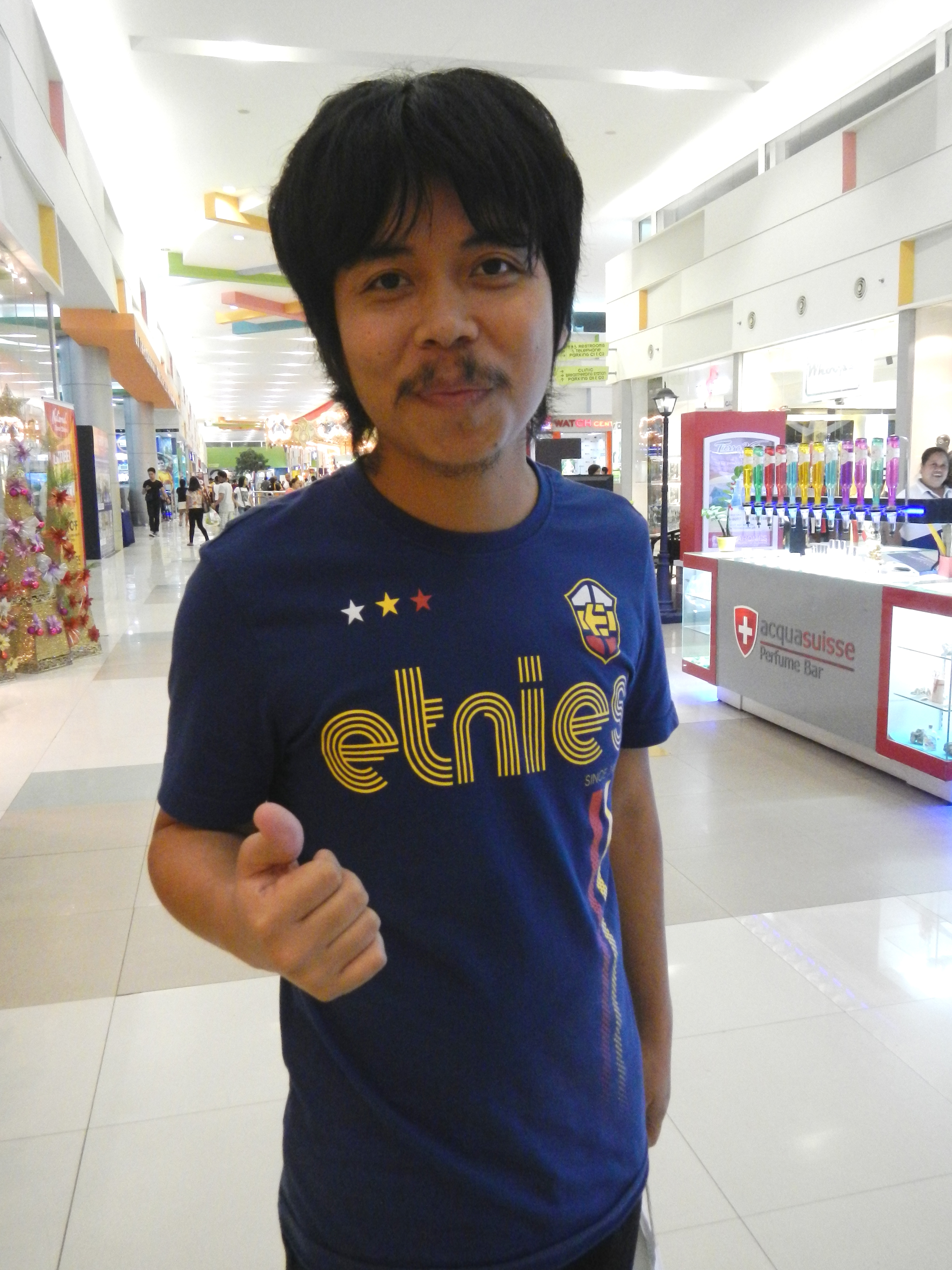
Empoy Marquez

Main cast

- Maja Salvador as Niña Domingo
- Noel Comia Jr. as Niño Domingo

Supporting cast

- Lilet as Gloria Domingo
- Arron Villaflor as Bert
- Empoy Marquez as Gardo
- Nikki Valdez as Ester Magsino
- Ian Pangilinan as Pol
- Sachzna Laparan as Janet
- Junyka Santarin as Jen Jen
- Moi Bien as Kagawad / Kapitana Isabelle "Isay" Bako
- Dudz Teraña as Felino "Pinang" Fuentes
- Rowi Du as Tanod Orly
- Noel Comia Sr. as Jaime
- Denise Joaquin as Delia
- JM Salvado as Kaloy
- Rener Concepcion as Ka Iking
- Laydee Gasalao as Fe
- Pooh as Andie
- Yayo Aguila as Yasmin
- Kat Galang as Mayumi
- Gio Alvarez as Tonio
- Miles Ocampo as Honey
- Mutya Orquia as Veronica
- Giselle Sanchez as Vanessa
- Michelle Vito as Michelle
- Joey Marquez as Daniel
- Izzy Canillo as Ethan
- Marissa Delgado as Governor Virginia
- Sunshine Cruz as Diana
- Ritz Azul as Jackie
- Raul Dillo as Mang Temyeng
- Kakai Bautista as Joyce
- Harvey Bautista as Marius
- Mon Confiado as Greg
- Nikko Natividad as Ulysses
- JC Santos as Alex
- Matet de Leon as Evelyn
- Jairus Aquino as Richard
- Igi Boy Flores as Andoy
- Rhap Aquino as Nando
- Nanette Inventor as Thelma
- Precious Lara Quigaman as Doc Kim
- Angel Albino as Belinda
- Joem Bascon as Nelson

Guest cast

- Ruby Ruiz as Belen Domingo
- Piolo Pascual as Mayor Christopher Charles Juarez

== Accolades ==
Awards and nominations
Year	Award giving body	Category	Recipients & Nominees	Results	Source
2021	Asian Academy Creative Awards	Best Drama Series (National Winner)	Niña Niño	Won	
2021	Asian Academy Creative Awards	Best Actress in A Leading Role (National Winner)	Maja Salvador	Won	

== Spin-off ==
Ang Himala ni Niño is a spin-off series that serves as a prequel to the original story. It stars Zion Cruz as Niño during his younger days in 2011. The series premiered on September 30, 2024 on TV5 and was ended on April 11, 2025, with a total of 140 episodes.
