= Oh, Mando! =

2020 Philippine streaming television series

- Official poster
- Genre: Romantic comedy; Drama; Boys' love
- Written by: Eduardo Roy Jr. Paolo Valconcha
- Directed by: Eduardo Roy Jr.
- Starring: Kokoy de Santos; Alex Diaz; Barbie Imperial
- Music by: Andrew Florentino
- Country of origin: Philippines
- Original languages: Filipino; English
- No. of episodes: 6

Production
- Executive producers: Carlo L. Katigbak; Jamie L. Lopez; Cory V. Vidanes; Roldeo T. Endrinal; Ginny Monteagudo-Ocampo
- Producer: Almond Derla
- Production locations: Metro Manila, Philippines; Sydney, Australia
- Cinematography: Rap Ramirez; Erwin Cruz
- Editor: Renard Torres
- Running time: 24–40 minutes
- Production companies: Dreamscape Entertainment; Found Films

Original release
- Network: iWantTFC
- Release: November 5 – December 10, 2020

Oh, Mando! is a Philippine romantic comedy streaming television series starring Kokoy de Santos, Alex Diaz and Barbie Imperial. Directed by Eduardo Roy Jr. and produced by Dreamscape Entertainment together with Found Films. It premiered on iWantTFC on November 5, 2020.

== Plot ==
Charming but timid college student Mando, a typical hopeless romantic meets Barry, an out-and-proud basketball star who is practically a prince from a fairytale. The only thing spoiling Mando's happy ending is the fact that Barry already has a boyfriend. To move on, Mando goes out with liberated architecture student Krisha and the two become lovers. One fateful day, Barry walks back into Mando's life. Now, he needs to choose - will it be mind over heart or heart over mind?

== Cast and characters ==
=== Main ===
- Kokoy de Santos as Armando "Mando" Deputado Jr., a first year Mass Communication student who gets into a complicated situation when his romantic feelings to his schoolboy crush blossoms while he is in a relationship with his girlfriend.
- Alex Diaz as Barry Cruz, Mando's schoolboy crush and Krisha's brother
- Barbie Imperial as Krisha Cruz, Mando's girlfriend and Barry's sister

=== Supporting ===
- Dominic Ochoa as Armando "Tatay Armando" Deputado Sr., Mando's father
- Andrea del Rosario as Sandra Deputado, Mando's mother
- Dionne Monsanto as Lucy, Sandra's girlfriend
- Joel Saracho as Mr. Siwa, St. Henry's theatre advisor
- Almira Muhlach as Pia, Barry and Krisha's mother
- Pontri Bernardo as Lino, Barry and Krisha's father
- Julian Roxas as Clark, Barry's boyfriend
- Sam Cafranca as Gabo, Tatay Armando's tenant
- Ronald del Rosario as Dado, Tatay Armando's friend
- Z Mejia as Kim Bash, Vince's Korean boyfriend and Clark's sidekick
- Ron Martin Angeles as St. Henry's varsity basketball player, Barry's teammate
- Vandave Paragas as St. Henry's varsity basketball player, Barry's teammate
- Miguel Villasis as St. Henry's varsity basketball player, Barry's teammate

== Production ==
Directing the web series is Eduardo Roy Jr. who was also the director of several Filipino independent films such as "Pamilya Ordinaryo", "Lola Igna", and "Fuccbois". It was teased around February 2020 but its production was hampered after four shooting days as an enhanced community quarantine was imposed due to the COVID-19 pandemic. Its production was later resumed in July when the quarantine restrictions were already eased.

== Episodes ==
No.	Title	Original release date
1	"Episode 1"	November 5, 2020
Armando Deputado Jr., aka Mando, a college freshman is cast in the role of Romeo in their school’s play, Romeo and Juliet. To celebrate his little victory, he goes out with his friends for some street food. Unknown to him, his college life is about to turn into an exhilarating roller coaster ride as he meets and instantly falls for the varsity player of another school, Barry.
2	"Episode 2"	November 12, 2020
Heartbroken over Barry, Mando decides to get past his feelings and focus on his role in the school play. He meets Krisha, a bright and liberated architecture student playing the Juliet to his Romeo. As the two get to know each other in rehearsals, Mando and Krisha find themselves in a budding romance. Taking their relationship from on-stage to real-life, they meet each other's families.
3	"Episode 3"	November 19, 2020
Barry and his boyfriend break up, putting the cager in low spirits. In a bid to comfort him, Mando and Krisha join him on a trip out of town. Mando gets uneasy as he deals with his recurring feelings for Barry.
4	"Episode 4"	November 26, 2020
Things between Mando and Barry come to a head. With emotions running high, the two make a mistake that will surely hurt Krisha.
5	"Episode 5"	December 3, 2020
Krisha joins the rest of the theater group in staging an LGBTQIA+ rally for their theater adviser, Mr. Siwa. Amidst the chaos of preparations, Vince and Leslie uncover Barry and Mando's secret.
6	"Episode 6"	December 10, 2020
With heavy hearts, Mando and Krisha perform their roles as Romeo and Juliet. Barry watches from the sidelines, silently hoping for the best.

== Soundtracks ==
Song title	Artist	Words and Music	Album	Year	Ref.
Mabagal	Daniel Padilla and Moira Dela Torre	Dan Tañedo	Himig Handog	2019	
Arayyy...	Mae Rivera	Benjamin Carreon	Arayyy...	2000	
Ikaw na Nga	Andrew Florentino	Andrew Florentino	-	2020	
Hanggang Matanggap ang Sagot Mo	Andrew Florentino	Andrew Florentino	-	2020	

== See also ==
- Gameboys
- Hello Stranger
- Gaya Sa Pelikula
- Ben X Jim
- Boys Lockdown
- The Boy Foretold by the Stars
