= Magpakailanman =

Philippine television drama series

- Title card since 2026
- Also known as: MPK
- Genre: Drama
- Presented by: Mel Tiangco
- Theme music composer: Wency Cornejo; Simon Tan and Senedy Que
- Opening theme: "Magpakailanman" by; Wency Cornejo; Wency Cornejo and Kyla; Golden Cañedo; "Pusong Pinoy, Magpakailanman" by Jeremiah Tiangco and Thea Astley; "Magpakailanman" by Wency Cornejo and Aicelle Santos
- Country of origin: Philippines
- Original language: Tagalog
- No. of episodes: (list of episodes)

Production
- Executive producer: Mona Coles-Mayuga
- Camera setup: Multiple-camera setup
- Running time: 39–69 minutes
- Production company: GMA Entertainment Group

Original release
- Network: GMA Network
- Release: December 2, 2002 – present

Magpakailanman (transl. forevermore) is a Philippine television drama anthology series broadcast by GMA Network. Hosted by Mel Tiangco, it premiered on December 2, 2002. The series concluded on December 27, 2007. The series returned on November 17, 2012, on the network's Sabado Star Power sa Gabi line up. It is the longest running drama anthology series of GMA Network.

The series is streaming online on YouTube.

== Overview ==
The show was originally created by GMA Entertainment TV Group as a limited drama special intended for the celebration of World Meeting of Families on January 23–24, 2003. Vilma Santos was offered to host the show and turned it down. Mel Tiangco was later hired to host. On December 27, 2007, the show was canceled.

In November 2012, the show was revived by GMA Network, with Tiangco reprising her role as the host. In March 2020, principal photography was halted due to the enhanced community quarantine in Luzon caused by the COVID-19 pandemic. The show resumed its programming on July 18, 2020.

== Ratings ==
According to AGB Nielsen Philippines' Mega Manila household television ratings, the pilot episode of the second run of Magpakailanman earned a 20.6% rating.

== Accolades ==
Accolades received by Magpakailanman
Year	Award	Category	Recipient	Result	Ref.
2003	Asian Television Award	Best Single Performance by an Actress	Jolina Magdangal ("Abot-Kamay na Pangarap: The Wayda Cosme Story")	Won	
2003	Catholic Mass Media Awards	Best Drama Series/Program	Magpakailanman	Won	
2003	17th PMPC Star Awards for Television	Best Drama Anthology	Magpakailanman	Nominated	
2003	17th PMPC Star Awards for Television	Best Single Performance by an Actor	Raymond Bagatsing ("May Liwanag sa Dilim")	Nominated	
2003	17th PMPC Star Awards for Television	Best Single Performance by an Actor	Tirso Cruz III ("Minsan May Isang Pangako")	Nominated	
2003	17th PMPC Star Awards for Television	Best Single Performance by an Actress	Sunshine Dizon ("Kakaibang Mukha ng Pag-ibig")	Won	
2003	17th PMPC Star Awards for Television	Best Single Performance by an Actress	Jolina Magdangal ("Pasakalye ng Isang Pangarap")	Nominated	
2004	Golden Screen TV Awards	Outstanding Drama Serial	"Babangon Din ang Kahapon"	Won	
2004	Golden Screen TV Awards	Outstanding Lead Actress in a Drama Special	Sunshine Dizon ("Babangon Din ang Kahapon")	Won	
2004	Gawad Tanglaw Awards	Best Drama Anthology	Magpakailanman	Won	
2004	Gawad Tanglaw Awards	Best Performance by an Actress	Jean Garcia ("Kalbaryo ng Isang Ina")	Won	
2004	18th PMPC Star Awards for Television	Best Drama Anthology	Magpakailanman	Nominated	
2004	18th PMPC Star Awards for Television	Best Single Performance by an Actress	Ara Mina ("Kapag ang Pag-Ibig ay Wagas: The Gerry & Marlene Mariano Story")	Won	
2004	18th PMPC Star Awards for Television	Best Single Performance by an Actress	Nora Aunor ("Silang Mga Inihabilin ng Langit")	Nominated	
2004	18th PMPC Star Awards for Television	Best Single Performance by an Actress	Sunshine Dizon ("Silang Mga Inihabilin ng Langit")	Nominated	
2005	Asian Television Award	Best Single Performance by an Actor	Nonie Buencamino ("Sa Kabila ng Karamdaman: An AIDS Victim Story")	Won	
2005	Asian Television Award	Best Single Performance by an Actress	Lorna Tolentino ("Sa Kabila ng Karamdaman: An AIDS Victim Story")	Won	
2005	Golden Screen TV Awards	Outstanding Drama Special	"Sa Kanya Ay Kumakatok, Ang Pinto Ay Bubuksan"	Nominated	
2005	Golden Screen TV Awards	Outstanding Lead Actor in a Drama Special	Christopher de Leon ("Sa Muling Pagsilip")	Nominated	
2005	Golden Screen TV Awards	Outstanding Lead Actor in a Drama Special	Romnick Sarmenta ("Samahang Walang Kapantay")	Nominated	
2005	Golden Screen TV Awards	Outstanding Lead Actress in a Drama Special	Rochelle Pangilinan ("Laban sa Magandang Kinabukasan")	Nominated	
2005	Golden Screen TV Awards	Outstanding Lead Actress in a Drama Special	Nadine Samonte ("Pag-Usbong Ng Isang Reyna")	Nominated	
2005	Golden Screen TV Awards	Outstanding Lead Actress in a Drama Special	Lorna Tolentino ("Sa Kabila ng Karamdaman: An AIDS Victim Story")	Nominated	
2005	Golden Screen TV Awards	Outstanding Supporting Actor in a Drama Special	Eddie Garcia ("Palimos Ng Pangarap")	Nominated	
2005	Golden Screen TV Awards	Outstanding Supporting Actress in a Drama Special	Daria Ramirez ("Laban Sa Magandang Kinabukasan")	Nominated	
2005	19th PMPC Star Awards for Television	Best Single Performance by an Actress	Lorna Tolentino ("Sa Kabila ng Karamdaman: An AIDS Victim Story"	Won	
2006	Asian Television Awards	Best Drama Series	Magpakailanman ("Kalbaryo ng Isang Ina: Patricia Dongallo Story")	Highly Commended	
2006	20th PMPC Star Awards for Television	Best Drama Anthology	Magpakailanman	Nominated	
2006	20th PMPC Star Awards for Television	Best Single Performance by an Actor	Jeremy Marquez ("Pag-Ahon sa Lusak")	Nominated	
2006	20th PMPC Star Awards for Television	Best Single Performance by an Actress	Alessandra de Rossi ("Pag-Ahon sa Lusak")	Nominated	
2006	20th PMPC Star Awards for Television	Best Single Performance by an Actress	Jean Garcia ("Kalbaryo ng Isang Ina")	Nominated	
2007	Catholic Mass Media Award	Best Drama Series/Program	Magpakailanman	Won	
2007	21st PMPC Star Awards for Television	Best Drama Anthology	Magpakailanman	Nominated	
2007	21st PMPC Star Awards for Television	Best Single Performance by An Actress	Gina Alajar ("Liyab ng Pag-Asa")	Nominated	
2007	21st PMPC Star Awards for Television	Best Single Performance by An Actress	Pauleen Luna ("Sa Dulo ng Pag-Ibig: The Olivia Ortiz Story")	Won	
2007	21st PMPC Star Awards for Television	Best Single Performance by An Actress	Lorna Tolentino ("Hiram na Haplos")	Nominated	
2008	Anak TV Seal Awards		Magpakailanman	Won	
2008	22nd PMPC Star Awards for Television	Best Drama Anthology	Magpakailanman	Nominated	
2009	Anak TV Seal Awards		Magpakailanman	Won	
2013	Gawad Tanglaw Awards	Best Performance by an Actress	Jean Garcia ("Kalbaryo ng Isang Ina: The Nanay Slyveria Story")	Won	
2013	27th PMPC Star Awards for Television	Best Drama Anthology	Magpakailanman	Won	
2013	27th PMPC Star Awards for Television	Best Single Performance by an Actor	Keempee de Leon ("Ang Tatay Kong Beki: The Ruben Marasigan Story")	Nominated	
2013	27th PMPC Star Awards for Television	Best Single Performance by an Actress	Krystal Reyes ("Batang Ina: The Tintin Ng Story")	Nominated	
2014	Golden Screen TV Awards	Outstanding Performance by an Actor in a Single Drama/Telemovie Program	Gabby Eigenmann ("Kagat ng Aso") Neil Ryan Sese ("Child Rape")	Nominated	
2014	Golden Screen TV Awards	Outstanding Performance by an Actress in a Single Drama/Telemovie Program	Agot Isidro ("Norma Castilli, Bataan Sex Worker") Jean Garcia ("Nanay Silveria") Lorna Tolentino ("Susan Maniego")	Nominated	
2014	Golden Screen TV Awards	Outstanding Single Drama/Telemovie Program	Mirriam Castillo Story Susan Maniego Story	Nominated	
2014	28th PMPC Star Awards for Television	Best Drama Anthology	Magpakailanman	Won	
2014	28th PMPC Star Awards for Television	Best Single Performance by an Actor	Alden Richards ("Kawalan ng Karapatan: The Dondon Lanuza) Gabby Eigenmann ("My Psychotic Husband") Kristofer Martin ("Siga Noon, Beki na Ngayon")	Nominated	
2014	28th PMPC Star Awards for Television	Best Single Performance by an Actress	Gina Pareño ("Ang Inang Hindi Malilimutan") Yasmien Kurdi ("Nalunod na Pag-Asa: The Cebu Ship Collision")	Nominated	
2015	29th PMPC Star Awards for Television	Best Drama Anthology	Magpakailanman	Won	
2015	29th PMPC Star Awards for Television	Best Single Performance by an Actor	Mike Tan ("8 Shades of Gay: The Tubato Family Story")	Nominated	
2015	29th PMPC Star Awards for Television	Best Single Performance by an Actress	Alessandra de Rossi ("Sabit-sabit, Kabit-kabit, Mga Pusong Malupit")	Nominated	
2016	30th PMPC Star Awards for Television	Best Drama Anthology	Magpakailanman	Nominated	
2016	30th PMPC Star Awards for Television	Best Single Performance by an Actor	Kristofer Martin ("Mag-Ama sa Bilangguan")	Won	
2016	30th PMPC Star Awards for Television	Best Single Performance by an Actor	John Arcilla ("Mag-Ama sa Bilangguan")	Nominated	
2017	31st PMPC Star Awards for Television	Best Drama Anthology	Magpakailanman	Nominated	
2017	31st PMPC Star Awards for Television	Best Single Performance by an Actor	Rocco Nacino ("Losing Jeffrey, Finding Jason")	Nominated	
2017	31st PMPC Star Awards for Television	Best Single Performance by an Actress	Janice de Belen ("Ang Swerteng Hatid ng Pera sa Basura")	Nominated	
2018	32nd PMPC Star Awards for Television	Best Drama Anthology	Magpakailanman	Nominated	
2018	32nd PMPC Star Awards for Television	Best Single Performance by An Actor	Ruru Madrid ("Takbo Ng Buhay Ko")	Won	
2018	32nd PMPC Star Awards for Television	Best Single Performance by An Actor	Alden Richards ("Kuwentong Marawi sa Mata ng Isang Sundalo")	Nominated	
2019	33rd PMPC Star Awards for Television	Best Drama Anthology	Magpakailanman	Nominated	
2019	33rd PMPC Star Awards for Television	Best Single Performance by An Actor	Jeric Gonzales ("Male Sex Slave sa Saudi")	Won	
2019	33rd PMPC Star Awards for Television	Best Single Performance by An Actor	Dennis Trillo ("Patawad, Ama Ko")	Nominated	
2021	34th PMPC Star Awards for Television	Best Drama Anthology	Magpakailanman	Nominated	
2021	34th PMPC Star Awards for Television	Best New Female TV Personality	Rere Madrid ("Tanging Ina ng Lahat: The Amelia Calma Story")	Nominated	
2021	34th PMPC Star Awards for Television	Best New Male TV Personality	Allen Ansay ("Buhay Kapalit ng Alak")	Nominated	
2021	34th PMPC Star Awards for Television	Best Single Performance by an Actor	Dennis Trillo ("OFW Most Wanted")	Nominated	
2021	34th PMPC Star Awards for Television	Best Single Performance by an Actor	Ruru Madrid ("Adik Sa'Yo")	Nominated	
2021	34th PMPC Star Awards for Television	Best Single Performance by an Actress	Glaiza de Castro ("Sino ang Baliw")	Nominated	
2023	35th PMPC Star Awards for Television	Best Drama Anthology	Magpakailanman	Won	
2023	35th PMPC Star Awards for Television	Best Single Performance by an Actor	Mark Herras ("I Married My Rapist Husband")	Nominated	
2023	35th PMPC Star Awards for Television	Best Single Performance by an Actor	Martin del Rosario ("The Lockdown Wife")	Nominated	
2023	35th PMPC Star Awards for Television	Best Single Performance by an Actor	Royce Cabrera ("Masahista for Hire")	Nominated	
2023	35th PMPC Star Awards for Television	Best Single Performance by an Actress	Bianca Umali ("Sayaw ng Buhay")	Nominated	
2023	35th PMPC Star Awards for Television	Best Single Performance by an Actress	Jennylyn Mercado ("Sa Kamay ng Fake Healer")	Won	
2023	35th PMPC Star Awards for Television	Best Single Performance by an Actress	Kyline Alcantara ("Rape Victim Ikinulong")	Nominated	
2024	Asian Academy Creative Awards	Best Single Drama/Telemovie/Anthology Episode	"Sa Puso't Isipan: The Cantillana Family Story"	Won	
2025	38th PMPC Star Awards for Television	Best Drama Anthology	Magpakailanman	Won	
2025	38th PMPC Star Awards for Television	Best Single Performance by an Actor	Boobay ("Taylor Made Success (The John MacLane Coronel Story)")	Nominated	
2025	38th PMPC Star Awards for Television	Best Single Performance by an Actor	Edgar Allan Guzman ("The Rejected Son (The Darwin Chong Story)")	Nominated	
2025	38th PMPC Star Awards for Television	Best Single Performance by an Actor	Gabby Eigenmann ("A Christmas Miracle (The Madrid Family Story)")	Nominated	
2025	38th PMPC Star Awards for Television	Best Single Performance by an Actor	Martin del Rosario ("Hostage in Israel (The Jimmy Pacheco Story)")	Nominated	
2025	38th PMPC Star Awards for Television	Best Single Performance by an Actor	Miguel Tanfelix ("Kung Mawawala Ka")	Nominated	
2025	38th PMPC Star Awards for Television	Best Single Performance by an Actor	Paolo Contis ("A Son's Karma (The Wilbert Tolentino Story)")	Won	
2025	38th PMPC Star Awards for Television	Best Single Performance by an Actor	Ricky Davao ("Papa Boy The Arnulfo and Alfritz Blache Story")	Nominated	
2025	38th PMPC Star Awards for Television	Best Single Performance by an Actress	Ai-Ai delas Alas ("Inang Walang Pamilya")	Nominated	
2025	38th PMPC Star Awards for Television	Best Single Performance by an Actress	Andrea Torres ("Kung Mawawala Ka")	Nominated	
2025	38th PMPC Star Awards for Television	Best Single Performance by an Actress	Bea Alonzo ("Always in My Mind (The Kath Basa Story)")	Nominated	
2025	38th PMPC Star Awards for Television	Best Single Performance by an Actress	Gladys Reyes ("Inaanak, Inanakan")	Won	
2025	38th PMPC Star Awards for Television	Best Single Performance by an Actress	Michelle Dee ("Wanted: Sperm Donor")	Nominated	
2025	38th PMPC Star Awards for Television	Best Single Performance by an Actress	Mylene Dizon ("A Christmas Miracle: The Madrid Family Story")	Nominated	
2025	38th PMPC Star Awards for Television	Best Single Performance by an Actress	Rhian Ramos ("Wanted: Sperm Donor")	Nominated	
2025	37th PMPC Star Awards for Television	Best Drama Anthology	Magpakailanman	Won	
2025	37th PMPC Star Awards for Television	Best Single Performance by an Actor	Benjamin Alves ("Mister Na Walang Misis")	Nominated	
2025	37th PMPC Star Awards for Television	Best Single Performance by an Actor	Martin del Rosario ("The Renerio 'The Amazing' Arizala Story")	Nominated	
2025	37th PMPC Star Awards for Television	Best Single Performance by an Actor	Kokoy De Santos ("A Son’s Promise (The Kokoy De Santos Story)")	Nominated	
2025	37th PMPC Star Awards for Television	Best Single Performance by an Actor	Gabby Eigenmann ("Mana Sa Inang Ama")	Nominated	
2025	37th PMPC Star Awards for Television	Best Single Performance by an Actor	Edgar Allan Guzman ("Love Times Three (The Joel And April Regal Love Story")	Nominated	
2025	37th PMPC Star Awards for Television	Best Single Performance by an Actor	Rocco Nacino ("Ang Batang Hamog (The Boy Zobel Story)")	Nominated	
2025	37th PMPC Star Awards for Television	Best Single Performance by an Actor	Alden Richards ("Sa Puso At Isipan (The Cantillana Family Story)")	Won	
2025	37th PMPC Star Awards for Television	Best Single Performance by an Actress	Amy Austria ("I Am Not My Mother")	Nominated	
2025	37th PMPC Star Awards for Television	Best Single Performance by an Actress	Rita Avila ("Ina Ka Ng Anak Mo")	Nominated	
2025	37th PMPC Star Awards for Television	Best Single Performance by an Actress	Shamaine Buencamino ("Ang Batang Hamog: The Boy Zobel Story")	Nominated	
2025	37th PMPC Star Awards for Television	Best Single Performance by an Actress	Therese Malvar ("Bayad Utang")	Nominated	
2025	37th PMPC Star Awards for Television	Best Single Performance by an Actress	Rochelle Pangilinan ("The Abused Teacher")	Won	
2025	37th PMPC Star Awards for Television	Best Single Performance by an Actress	Mylene Dizon ("A Christmas Miracle: The Madrid Family Story")	Nominated	
2025	37th PMPC Star Awards for Television	Best Single Performance by an Actress	Rhian Ramos ("Ang Hiling sa Diyos: The Vance Uy-Cuaki Story")	Nominated	
