= Barbie Imperial =

Filipino actress (born 1998)

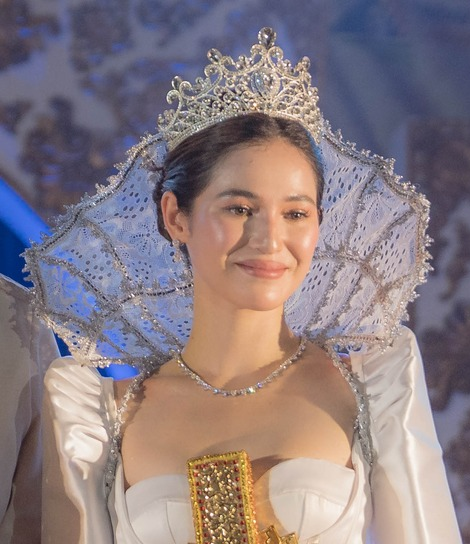
- Imperial in 2024
- Born: Barbie Concina Imperial; August 1, 1998 (age 28); Daraga, Albay, Philippines
- Occupation: Actress
- Years active: 2015–present
- Agent: Star Magic (2015–present)
- Known for: Michelle Verano in Araw Gabi
- Relatives: Michele Gumabao (cousin); Marco Gumabao (cousin); Gretchen Fullido (cousin)

Barbie Concina Imperial (Tagalog: [ˈbaɾbi ʔɪmpɛɾˈjal]; born August 1, 1998) is a Filipino actress. She is best known for her lead role in Araw Gabi.

== Early life and background ==
Barbie Concina Imperial was born on August 1, 1998 in Daraga, Albay. She and her older half-brother, Bryce were raised by a single mother, Marilyn "Bing" Imperial in a modest home by the railway tracks. She excelled academically as a grade school valedictorian. She later expanded her education by pursuing professional culinary arts training.

== Career ==
In 2015, Imperial joined the Pinoy Big Brother: 737 and was dubbed as "The Doll along the Riles of Albay" due to her dollface.

=== 2015–2018: Breakthrough ===
She also played multiple guest roles in Maalaala Mo Kaya playing the various roles of Hannah, Glaiza, and herself. She played her own story in Maalaala Mo Kaya entitled Riles.

Later, she appeared as a Girltrends member and is one of the regular guests in It's Showtime.

Later in February 2018, she was cast as an antagonist in Wansapanataym: Gelli in a Bottle. opposite to Loisa Andalio and Ronnie Alonte. Imperial portrayed the main villain role of Rachel San Pedro in that series. Rachel is the heartless and cunning classmate who makes Gelli's life miserable as hell. She hates her due to Gelli's arrogant and harsh personality.

=== 2018–present: Biggest break ===
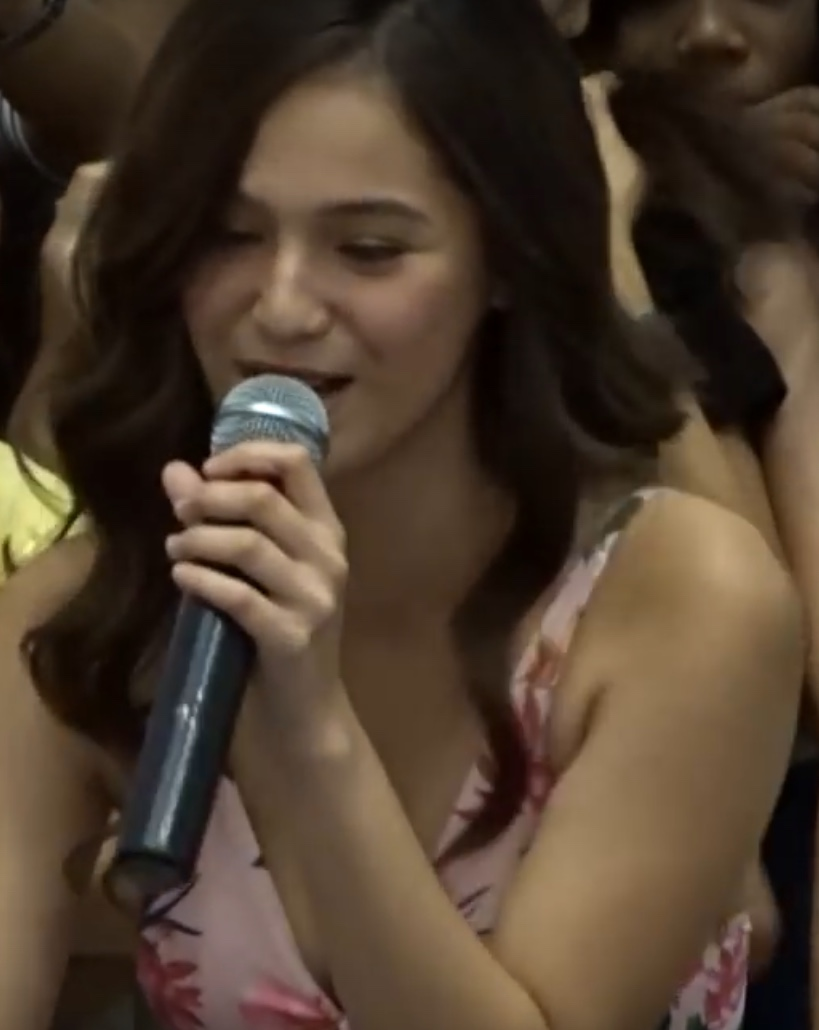
Barbie Imperial at her mall show of Araw Gabi.

In 2018, Imperial got her biggest break where she currently portrays the role of Michelle Verano the lead character along with her leading man JM de Guzman.

In 2024, she joins the hit primetime action series FPJ's Batang Quiapo as Tisay, a singer and a gambler who crosses paths with Tanggol (played by Coco Martin).

== Other ventures ==
=== Food and Beverage Ventures ===
She enrolled at the Center for Culinary Arts (CCA) Manila in 2024 to pursue professional cooking. She has explored various partnerships and investment opportunities within the local food scene, including ties to concepts inspired by peers like Ara Mina.

== Personal life ==
Imperial grew up in a broken family, not seeing her father.

Imperial is a cousin of the Gumabao siblings (Michele, Marco, Kat and Paolo) and Gretchen Fullido.

On January 19, 2026, Imperial confirmed that she is in a relationship with Richard Gutierrez. They previously worked together in the show La Luna Sangre.

== Filmography ==
Key
†	Denotes productions that have not yet been released

=== Film ===
Year	Title	Role	Ref.
2016	Love Me Tomorrow	Jerl	
2018	Kasal	Clara	
2019	Finding You	Grace	
2019	You Have Arrived	Dani	
2020	Mang Kepweng: Ang Lihim ng Bandanang Itim	Devie	
2021	Dulo	Bianca	
2023	I Love Lizzy	Lizzy	
2024	3 Days And 2 Nights In Poblacion	Charlie	
2024	How To Slay A Nepo	Cass	

=== Television ===
Year	Title	Role	Ref.
2015	Pinoy Big Brother: 737	Housemate	
2015	All of Me	Apple de Asis	
2015	Maalaala Mo Kaya: Bottled Water	Hannah	
2016	Maalaala Mo Kaya: Riles	Barbie Concina Imperial	
2016–2017	It's Showtime	Girltrend / Guest co-host	
2016–2017	Langit Lupa	Jenny	
2016	Maalaala Mo Kaya: Police Uniform	Judy's sister	
2017	Ipaglaban Mo: Sementado	Liza	
2017	Ipaglaban Mo: Saklolo	Marilyn	
2017	Maalaala Mo Kaya: Family Tree	Young Clara	
2017	La Luna Sangre	Aira Feliz "Aife" Javier	
2018	Ipaglaban Mo: Mulat	Lexy	
2018	Maalaala Mo Kaya: Mangga	Glaiza	
2018	Wansapanataym: Gelli in a Bottle	Rachel San Pedro	
2018–present	ASAP XP	Co-host / Performer	
2018	Precious Hearts Romances Presents: Araw Gabi	Michelle "Mich/Boning" Verano / Anna Vida De Alegre	
2018	Ipaglaban Mo: Set-up	Bea Soriano	
2018	Wansapanataym: Switch Be With You	Pia Versoza / Upeng	
2019	Maalaala Mo Kaya: Journal	Allanis Marie Claire Book	
2019	Ipaglabab Mo: Saltik	Mitch	
2019	Maalaala Mo Kaya: Lipstick	Maria	
2019	Taiwan That You Love	Olivia "Ivi" Libarios	
2020	Banana Sundae	Various Roles	
2020	FPJ's Ang Probinsyano	PLt. Camille Villanuna	
2020	Bagong Umaga	Catherine "Cai" Buencorazon Veradona / Catherine "Cai" Magbanua	
2020	Oh, Mando!	Krisha Cruz	
2021	Click Like Share	Jenna	
2022	The Goodbye Girl	Sheryl	
2024	FPJ's Batang Quiapo	Tisay	
2025	Sins of the Father	Naomi Silvano	
2026	Pinoy Big Brother: Celebrity Collab Edition 2.0	Houseguest	
2026	Blood vs Duty	Jamilah Abubakar	

=== Music videos ===
Year	Title	Artist	Role	Ref.
2018	Sa Mga Bituin Na Lang Ibubulong	Barbie Imperial	Herself	
