= Ten Little Mistresses =

2023 Philippine comedy film

- Official poster for Ten Little Mistresses
- Directed by: Jun Lana
- Written by: Jun Lana
- Produced by: Josabeth Alonso; Jun Lana; Perci Intalan
- Starring: Eugene Domingo; John Arcilla; Agot Isidro; Carmi Martin; Pokwang; Arci Muñoz; Christian Bables; Sharlene San Pedro; Kris Bernal; Kate Alejandrino; Iana Bermudez; Adrianna So
- Cinematography: Carlo Canlas Mendoza
- Edited by: Benjamin Tolentino
- Music by: Teresa Barrozo
- Production companies: The IdeaFirst Company; Quantum Productions
- Distributed by: Amazon Prime Video
- Release date: February 15, 2023
- Running time: 125 minutes
- Country: Philippines
- Language: Filipino

Ten Little Mistresses (released locally as Sampung Mga Kerida) is a 2023 Philippine black comedy mystery film. The film was produced by The IdeaFirst Company in association with Quantum Productions and is the first Filipino-produced film to be launched on Amazon Prime Video.

The film stars Eugene Domingo and John Arcilla, with the 10 "mistresses" portrayed by Pokwang, Carmi Martin, Agot Isidro, Kris Bernal, Arci Muñoz, Christian Bables, Sharlene San Pedro, Iana Bernardez, Kate Alejandrino, and Adrianna So. The title of the film is a reference to the American nursery rhyme "Ten Little Indians" and Filipino's "Sampung mga Daliri". The film debuted at number one in the Amazon Top Prime Videos in the Philippines.

== Synopsis ==
The film follows the story of a widowed billionaire, Valentin Esposo, and his ten mistresses who want to become his new legal wife. After Esposo gathers his mistresses together and apologizes for mistreating them, he dies at the gathering. All 10 women end up as suspects in his death.

== Cast and characters ==
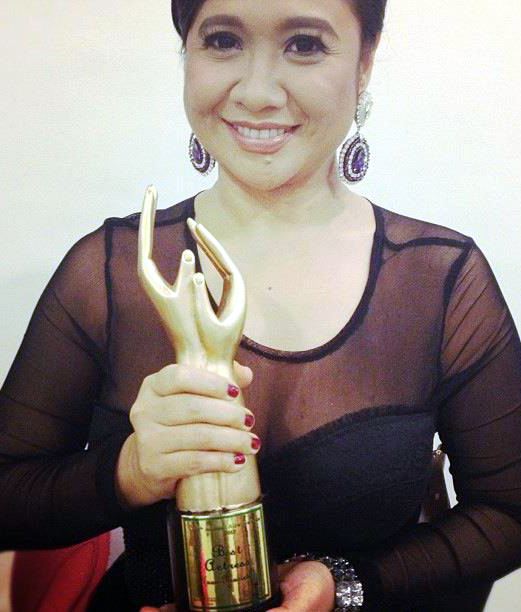
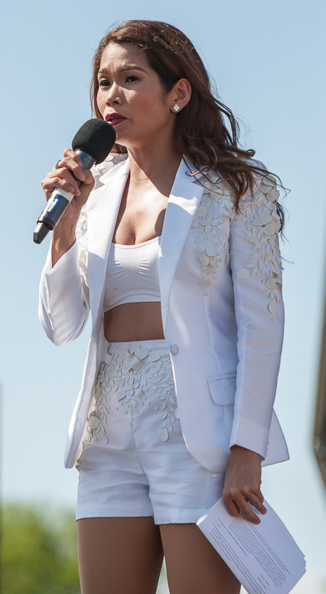
Eugene Domingo (left) and Pokwang (right).
- Eugene Domingo as Lilith, Valentin's head maid. Lilith became Valentin's fiancée after his wife's death.
- John Arcilla as Valentin, a billionaire who invited his ten mistresses to his mansion for his 60th birthday to end things with them and to announce his marriage to Lilith.
  - John Arcilla also plays the role of Constantin, Valentin's twin brother.
- Carmi Martin as Magenta, Valentin's first mistress who has a rivalry with Babet for stealing Valentin from her.
- Pokwang as Babet, Valentin's second mistress after Magenta. She is the owner of a successful pawnshop franchise and the only mistress to conceive a child with Valentin.
- Agot Isidro as Helga, Valentin's third mistress and a well-known plastic surgeon. She has an ongoing rivalry with Diva as she tends to copy Helga's outfits, mannerisms and dialogue.
- Kris Bernal as Diva, Helga's former assistant. She underwent facial procedures from Helga before becoming Valentin's fourth mistress.
- Arci Muñoz as Aura, Valentin's fifth mistress. A fortune teller who always carries around a crystal ball, she predicts that a death will occur on Valentin's birthday.
- Adrianna So as Because, Valentin's sixth mistress. She is a social media influencer named Because because of her repeated "because?" remarks during conversation.
- Kate Alejandrino as Sparkle, Valentin's seventh mistress and a beauty queen. She dislikes Because due to the fact that she thinks Because doesn't deserve her fame.
- Christian Bables as Lady H., the sibling of Lady G., the deceased eighth mistress of Valentin. Lady H. dresses up as Lady G. and arrives at Valentin's mansion with the intent of avenging their sister, making them the primary suspect in Valentin's murder.
- Sharlene San Pedro as Moon-Young, the ninth and youngest of the mistresses. She likes to make references to Korean dramas.
- Iana Bernardez as Coco, the tenth and latest mistress. She advocates for women empowerment, but is considered a hypocrite by the other mistresses.
- Donna Cariaga as Chicklet, one of the housemaids and Lilith's second-in-command.
- Cherry Pie Picache as Charo, Valentin's late wife.

== Production ==
=== Filming ===
Filming was scheduled to begin in early 2021, but was delayed for budgetary reasons. One of the producers, Perci Intalan, approached Prime Video and obtained funding. The film began principal photography in late 2022 and began filming early 2023 with various locations in Alitagtag, Batangas, Philippines and in Club Morocco Beach Resort & Country Club in Subic, Zambales, Philippines.

=== Costume design ===
Jaylo Conanan served as the costume designer and Jaydee Jasa designed the wigs for the film, drawing inspiration from "extravaganza" and "drag". The costumes were designed to be "loud" and embellished, with large hair-pieces worn by the mistresses. The producers described the costumes as "campy" and "colorful".

== Themes ==
The film's cast and crew explained that the film was released on Valentine's Day to highlight women's worth and self-respect. Domingo credited director and producer Jun Lana for focusing on women's beauty, stating, “The point is, we are very beautiful. We are the most beautiful God has created. ... Do not settle for anyone who is less than what you deserve”.

== Release ==
On February 7, 2023, a special screeneing for the cast was hosted at Red Carpet Cinemas in Shangri La Mall. The first teaser was released on January 13, 2023, by Amazon Prime. It was released worldwide on February 15, 2023.

== Reception ==
Kristofer Purnell of The Philippine Star gave the film a positive review, noting the film's similarity to Agatha Christie's novels and the American film Knives Out (2019), and applauding the film for its incorporation of Filipino culture and its embrace of camp. Aldous Vince Cabildo from Tripzilla called the film hilarious and praised the film's ensemble cast. Fred Hawson of ABS-CBN News gave the film a mixed review, noting the visual spectacle and outlandish costume design, while critiquing gaps in the plot and the mistresses' backstories. Em Enriquez of Preview described the film as an "in-your-face" type of comedy, noting its feminist undertones. She concluded that the film takes "hints of sarcasm and humor and puts them on steroids. It uses them to propel forward the moral of the story without sacrificing a bloody good time for the viewers. By the time the credits roll, the message is expressed loud and clear." Le Baltar from Rappler gave the film an average review, situating the film in the "kabit" (infidelity) genre—noting its similarities to Chito Roño’s Minsan Lang Kita Iibigin (1994), Ruel Bayani’s No Other Woman (2011), and Rory Quintos and Dado Lumibao’s The Legal Wife (2014)—and remarking upon the film's progressive lens. Philip Cu Unjieng of the Manila Bulletin also offered a mixed review, praising Eugene Domingo's performance, but criticizing the film for an "excess of camp" that felt like "the dramatization and extension of a gay bar stand-up act". Nylon Manila's Rafael Bautista highlighted Domingo's performance, calling her a comedy queen. He also praised Cariaga for her delivery of "the most random statements at the most unlikely of times, with no inflection in her voice whatsoever". Indonesian film critic Bavner Donaldo of Cinejour highlighted the film as an instant cult.

== Soundtrack ==
The film featured an original song in its opening scene, titled as "Sampung mga Kerida". The main soundtrack for the film is Maymay Entrata's "Amakabogera", released in October 2021.
