= Project Destination =

2020 Philippine television drama series

- Title card
- Genre: Drama
- Written by: Felinda Bagas
- Directed by: Zig Dulay
- Starring: Migo Adecer; Kate Valdez; Royce Cabrera
- Country of origin: Philippines
- Original language: Tagalog
- No. of episodes: 6

Production
- Production company: GMA News and Public Affairs

Original release
- Network: GMA News TV
- Release: March 14 – April 18, 2020

Project Destination is a 2020 Philippine television drama series broadcast by GMA News TV. Directed by Zig Dulay, it stars Migo Adecer, Kate Valdez and Royce Cabrera. It premiered on GMA News TV on March 14, 2020. The series concluded on April 18, 2020, with a total of six episodes.

== Cast and characters ==
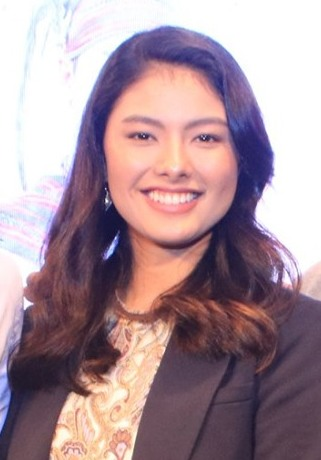
Kate Valdez portrays Loret.

- Migo Adecer as Andre
- Kate Valdez as Loret
- Royce Cabrera as Jay
- Yul Servo as Jojo
- Angeli Bayani as Isabel

== Production ==
Project Destination is a production of GMA News and Public Affairs, made under the commission of the National Commission for Culture and the Arts. The series was directed by Zig Dulay. Conceptualized a drama series as a platform to promote "Filipino values" remarking that the government cultural agency could not just conduct lectures about values traditionally believing that such methods would not be receptive to the youth. A budget of ₱14 million was allotted by the NCAA for the project.

The NCAA conducted two years of research as part of Project Destination's production conducting focus group discussion with various groups including indigenous groups, the academe, and the business sector and inquired them of what do they value "as a Filipino". The discussions were held using various dialects and languages.

The NCAA were able to identify 160 values and trimmed down their list to just 19 by dropping values that have the same meaning or is similar to another. According to the agency the most common values they identify relate to "love for family" and "giving importance to education".

== Music ==
The theme song of Project Destination, "Dati'y Pangarap Lang Kita" was performed by Aiza Seguerra. and composed by NCCA Public Affairs and Information head Rene Napeñas.

== Broadcast ==
Project Destination aired every Saturday late afternoon on GMA News TV for six weeks, starting on March 14, 2020.
