= I Love Lizzy =

2023 Filipino film

- Promotional poster
- Directed by: RC Delos Reyes
- Screenplay by: Onay Sales-Camero
- Story by: Erwin Blanco
- Produced by: Erwin Blanco; Ellice Tuason
- Starring: Carlo Aquino; Barbie Imperial
- Cinematography: Marvin Reyes
- Edited by: Noah Tonga
- Music by: Lean Calvo
- Production company: Mavx Production
- Distributed by: Star Magic
- Release date: January 18, 2023
- Running time: 102 minutes
- Country: Philippines
- Language: Filipino

I Love Lizzy is a 2023 Philippine romantic drama film directed by RC Delos Reyes. It stars Carlo Aquino and Barbie Imperial. The film tells the story of a seminarian who meets and falls in love with Lizzy. It was released theatrically on January 18, 2023, and simultaneously became available for streaming on Netflix.

== Synopsis ==
The film follows Jeff (Carlo Aquino), a young seminarian who embarks on a soul-searching journey to Albay, Philippines, contemplating his commitment to priesthood. However, his path takes an unexpected turn when he crosses paths with Lizzy (Barbie Imperial), a local tour guide. Their love story becomes the centerpiece of a poignant exploration into the clash between love and faith, unraveling a profound crisis of belief within Jeff.

== Cast ==
=== Main ===
- Carlo Aquino as Jeff

A seminarian taking time off to explore and travel between his leave to become a priest.

- Barbie Imperial as Lizzy

A female local tour guide from Albay.

=== Supporting ===
- Robert Seña as Tatay Abner
- Yukii Takahashi as Kring
- Turs Daza as Ben
- Meann Espinosa as Em-em
- Andrew Gan as Ned
- Joseph Villanueva as Arnel
- Jim Bergado as Gelo
- Inno Kristoffer Rivera as Godsent

== Production ==
=== Development ===
The film was announced last May 2023 when Carlo Aquino and Barbie Imperial posted on their respective social media that they are working together in a new project, which is part of Star Magic's 30th anniversary celebration.
