= G! LU =

- Go! La Union
- Directed by: Philip King
- Written by: Philip King
- Produced by: Philip King; Ben Chan; Arnold Vegafria
- Starring: David Licauco; Derrick Monasterio; Teejay Marquez; Kiko Estrada; Ruru Madrid; Enzo Pineda
- Cinematography: Mo Zee
- Edited by: Tara Illenberger
- Music by: Emerzon Texon; Immanuel Verona
- Production companies: ALV Films; Benchingko/Films
- Distributed by: Rein Entertainment Productions
- Release date: April 24, 2024
- Running time: 89 minutes
- Country: Philippines
- Language: Tagalog

G! LU (lit. 'Go! La Union') is a 2024 Filipino comedy film written and directed by Philip King, starring David Licauco, Kiko Estrada, Derrick Monasterio, Ruru Madrid, Teejay Marquez, and Enzo Pineda. The film released on April 24, 2024. It is the directoral debut of Philip King. The film focuses on various issues like mental health, gender and love issues.

== Synopsis ==
Six friends. One last epic summer adventure. Join a group of friends, who go on a vacation in La Union and encounter new experiences as they hang out with girls and party.

== Cast ==
=== Main cast ===
- David Licauco as Patrick Dy
- Ruru Madrid as Albert Ramirez
- Derrick Monasterio as Ryan Santos
- Enzo Pineda as Brian Santos
- Teejay Marquez as Raymond Gomez
- Kiko Estrada as Carlos Villamor

=== Supporting cast ===
- Carl Guevara as Aaron
- Ken Anderson as Chippy Alonzo
- Michelle Dee as Sarah
- Katarina Rodriguez as Kathy
- Sophia Senoron as Erika Manalo
- Chanel Morales as Lala Gonzales
- Maureen Montagne as Rhea Garcia
- Dawn Chang as Beth Gan
- Kimi Mugford as Issa Cruz
- Denver Hernandez as Tonio
- Ali Forbes
- Pinky Amador
- Bambi Habalo
- Marlon Mance
- Eliza Sarmienta
- Allan Villafuerte
- Pontri Bernardo
- Ryan Artienda
- Posh Develos

== Reception ==
The film was made in 2019 and supposed to be released on 2020 but due to the COVID-19 pandemic the producers decided to shelve the project. After five years the film released on April 24, 2024.
