= Royce Cabrera =

Filipino actor, model and engineer (born 1996)

- Born: John Rocell Cabrera; September 5, 1996 (age 30); Manila, Philippines
- Education: Mapúa University (BS)
- Occupations: Actor; model; engineer
- Years active: 2017–present
- Agents: Star Magic (2019–2020); Sparkle GMA Artist Center (2020–present)

John Rocell "Royce" Cabrera (Tagalog: [ɹˈɔ͡ɪs kˈæbɹɚɹə]; born September 5, 1996) is a Filipino actor, model, and engineer. He is currently an exclusive talent of GMA Network under Sparkle GMA Artist Center.

== Early life and education ==
John Rocell Cabrera was born on September 5, 1996 in Manila.

In the mid-2020s, Cabrera graduated with a degree in BS Construction Engineering and Management from Mapúa University.

== Career ==
In 2017, Cabrera was the grand winner of the search for Mr. Mapua Cardinals. In the same year, he was introduced in the movie Baklad.

In 2019, he was one of the lead actors in the LGBT film Fuccbois under the helm of Eduardo Roy Jr. He became a talent in ABS-CBN's Star Magic talent agency. He guested in television anthologies and series Maalaala Mo Kaya, Ipaglaban Mo, and A Soldier's Heart.

In 2020, he signed an exclusive contract and became an actor under Sparkle GMA Artist Center, with his first debut GMA Network in My Fantastic Pag-ibig. He also made appearances in Magpakailanman, Pepito Manaloto, Tadhana, Nagbabagang Luha and Regal Studio Presents.

He also played Jefferson "Jeff" Katipunan in the 2022 Philippine television romance drama series Start-Up PH, as Vergil Herrera in 2023 romance fantasy series The Write One and as Jericho Domo/Palacios in the 2024 mystery drama series Widows' War.

In 2025, he is cast as Inspector Juro on Slay.

== Filmography ==
=== Television ===
Year	Title	Role	Ref.
2026	You're My Favorite Song		
2025	Sanggang-Dikit FR	Lt. Sandro Paloma	
2025	Slay: 'Til Death Do Us Part	Juro Catapang	
2024–2025	Widows' War	Jericho Domo Palacios	
2024	Lilet Matias: Attorney-at-Law	Ricardo "Karding" Veloso	
2024	Makiling	Renato "Ren" Ibarrola	
2023	Imbestigador: Batangas Kidnap Case	Jao-Jao	
2023	The Write One	Virgil	
2023	Imbestigador	Jhun Leo Pañares	
2022	Start-Up PH	Jefferson "Jeff" Katipunan	
2021	Nagbabagang Luha	Sherwin Enriquez	
2021	Magpakailanman: Masahista	Mackoy	
2020	A Soldier's Heart	Andy Alfonso	
2020	Maalaala Mo Kaya	Prospect 1 / Kobe's Friend / Romy	
2020	Project Destination	Jay	
2020	Magpakailanman: #FisherGays	Jimboy	
2019	Ipaglaban Mo!	Jerico	

=== Film ===
Year	Title	Role	Ref.
TBA	Bar Boys: After School		
2023	Marupok AF	Theo Balmaceda	
2022	Call Me Papi	Lito	
2022	Broken Blooms	Romy	
2021	Arisaka	Yang	
2020	Alter Me (post-production)		
2020	U Turn	Jang Jang	
2019	Silly Red Shoes	Gerald	
2019	Gitarista	young Marcelo	
2019	Lola Igna	Bok	
2019	Fuccbois	Ace	
2017	Nabubulok		
2017	Baklad		

=== Web series ===
Year	Title	Role	Ref.
2020	Ben X Jim	Roy	
2020	Quaranthings	Rocky	
2021	Section: St. Valentine - The Disappearance of Divine	James Pasyon	
