= List of Magpakailanman episodes =

Lists of Magpakailanman episodes are contained in the following articles:

- List of Magpakailanman episodes (2002–2007)#Episodes
- List of Magpakailanman episodes (2012–2019)#Episodes
- List of Magpakailanman episodes (2020–present)#Episodes
