= Harus Kawin =

- Genre: Drama; Comedy
- Screenplay by: Vemmy Sagita
- Directed by: Vemmy Sagita
- Starring: Haico Van der Veken; Kevin Julio; Junior Roberts; Angela Gilsha; Fatih Unru; Gabriella Ekaputri; Karina Suwandi; Adipura; Debby Sahertian; Nova Soraya; Mathias Muchus; Kaemita Boediono; Bara Valentino; Lorenzo Abraham; Agatha Valerie; Yoona Gimenez; Aditya Herpavi; Rexy Rizky; Fadil Joan; Dian Sidik; Johan Morgan
- Opening theme: "Be My Wife", Billy Simpson
- Ending theme: "Be My Wife", Billy Simpson
- Country of origin: Indonesia
- Original language: Indonesian
- No. of seasons: 1
- No. of episodes: 8

Production
- Executive producers: David S. Suwarto; Jeff Han; Kaichen Li; Lesley Simpson
- Producers: Lesley Simpson; Lili Sunawati
- Cinematography: Deni Irawan
- Editor: Bambang Herdiana
- Camera setup: Multi-camera
- Running time: 60 minutes
- Production company: SinemArt

Original release
- Network: WeTV; iflix
- Release: 5 January – 29 February 2024

Harus Kawin is an Indonesian television series produced by SinemArt which aired from 5 January 2024 to 29 February 2024 on WeTV and iflix. It starred Haico Van der Veken, Kevin Julio, and Junior Roberts.

== Plot ==
Yuki and Michael, two childhood best friends, face immense pressure from their mothers to get married. However, their mothers' ambitions for marriage remain unfulfilled, as they both face career challenges and differing perceptions about marriage.

Yuki, a young director, and Michael, a talented screenwriter, are struggling to find work after graduating from college. A surprise comes when they finally get the chance to work at a renowned production house. However, an even bigger surprise awaits Yuki when he discovers he has to work with Maxim, the man who ruined his dreams and hopes during his college years.

Yuki's resentment grows when he sees Maxim's reckless behavior, which often involves women at parties. He wants to prove to Maxim that he isn't the nerd he once thought. Yuki eventually attends the production house's anniversary party. Ultimately, an unexpected incident occurs, leaving Yuki, Michael, Maxim, Cindy, and Brandon, their team, to face severe consequences, with Maxim being the cause.

However, the complexity of the story doesn't end there. Yuki and Michael's parents give them vacation tickets to Rabbit Island in the hope of finding a life partner. Maxim, learning of this, decides to go to Rabbit Island under pressure from his father, who wants him to have grandchildren soon. Maxim's presence there also aims to prevent Yuki, whom he has long admired, from finding a life partner there.

== Cast ==
- Haico Van der Veken as Yuki Rania
- Kevin Julio as Michael Donovan
- Junior Roberts as Maxim
- Angela Gilsha as Cindy
- Fatih Unru as Brandon
- Gabriella Ekaputri as Valerie
- Karina Suwandi as Lusi
- Adipura as Alex
- Debby Sahertian as Anita
- Nova Soraya as Rani
- Mathias Muchus as Jerry
- Kaemita Boediono as Maria
- Bara Valentino as Ron
- Lorenzo Abraham as Steven
- Aylena Fusil as Pauline
- Catalina Alcorse as Rose
- Agatha Valerie as Natasha
- Yoona Gimenez as Nindy
- Aditya Herpavi as produser
- Hayu Pangastuti as sekretaris
- Rexy Rizky as Jeremy
- Fadil Joan as Angga
- Dian Sidik as peselancar
- Johan Morgan as papa Yuki

== Production ==
=== Development ===
SinemArt officially announced Harus Kawin in October 2023.

=== Casting ===
Haico Van der Veken was confirmed to play female lead, Yuki. Kevin Julio was reported to play male lead, Michael. Angela Gilsha was finalised to play Cindy.

=== Filming ===
The series is mainly filmed in Bali and Nusa Lembongan.
