= Kokoy de Santos =

Filipino actor, singer, dancer, and comedian (born 1998)

- Born: Ronald Marquez de Santos, Jr. May 15, 1998 (age 28); General Trias, Cavite, Philippines
- Education: Institute of Culinary and Kitchen Services
- Occupations: Actor; singer; dancer; commercial model; comedian
- Years active: 2010–present
- Agents: The IdeaFirst Company; Sparkle GMA Artist Center (2022–present)
- Height: 5 ft 8 in (173 cm)
- Parents: Ronald de Santos Sr. (father); Chenie Marquez de Santos (mother)
- Relatives: Kai de Santos (sister); Gel de Santos (brother)
- Website: Kokoy de Santos on Instagram and Video on YouTube

Ronald Marquez de Santos Jr. (born May 15, 1998), known professionally as Kokoy de Santos, is a Filipino actor, singer, dancer, commercial model, and comedian. His movie Fuccbois was an official entry to the 15th Cinemalaya Philippine Independent Film Festival. He is currently an exclusive talent of GMA Network and Sparkle GMA Artist Center.

In May 2020, he was cast as one of the main actors in the web series Gameboys. Produced by The IdeaFirst Company, it is a boys love (BL) series in the Philippines that tackles the story of two young boys who found each other online amidst the COVID-19 pandemic. Santos plays the role of Gavreel Alarcon alongside Elijah Canlas who plays the role of Cairo Lazaro, a famous online game streamer, in the thirteen-part series.

== Education ==
De Santos graduated from Boy Logro’s Institute of Culinary & Kitchen Services, Inc.

== Filmography ==
=== Film ===
Year	Title	Role	Notes
2010	Emir	Edmund	credited as Ronald de Santos
2013	Bromance: My Brother's Romance	Teen Brando / Teen Brandy	Supporting role (credited as Ronald de Santos Jr.)
2013	Kimmy Dora: Ang Kiyemeng Prequel	Theater Audience	Supporting role
2014	Tumbang Preso (In The Can)	Carlo	Main role
2015	Kid Kulafu	Robert	Supporting role
2016	Die Beautiful	Miko	Supporting role
2018	Signal Rock	Gabs	Supporting role
2019	Fuccbois	Miko	Main role
2019	Hellcome Home	Terrence	Supporting role
2020	How to Die Young in Manila	Orson	Short Film (Busan International Film Festival)
2021	Gameboys: The Movie	Gavreel Mendoza Alarcon	Main role
2023	Voltes V: Legacy – The Cinematic Experience	Harvey Perez	Supporting role
2023	Mary Cherry Chua	Paco Martinez	Supporting role
2023	Firefly	Romnick Alcantara	Supporting role
2024	Your Mother's Son	Emman	Main role, National Best Actor (Asian Academy Creative Awards)
2024	And the Breadwinner Is...	Boy Salvador	Supporting role
2025	Rekonek	Jasper	Supporting role

=== Television ===
Year	Title	Role	Notes
2011	Futbolilits	Mercury "Merc" Almodovar	Supporting role
2012	Makapiling Kang Muli	Young Luisito "Louie" Valencia	Guest cast (credited as Ronald de Santos)
2012	Walang Tulugan with the Master Showman	Himself	Performer (credited as Ronald de Santos)
2013	Kidlat	Alvin	Supporting role
2013	My Husband's Lover	Jackson	Uncredited
2015	#ParangNormal Activity	Gino	
2015	Oh My G!	Carlos Miguel "Micoy" Arellano	Supporting role
2016–2017	The Greatest Love	Luis	Supporting role
2016	Pinoy Boyband Superstar	Himself	Contestant
2017	Maalala Mo Kaya: Tape Recorder	Von	
2018	Pusong Ligaw	Caloy	
2018	Maalaala Mo Kaya: Orasan	Lorenzo	
2018	Maalaala Mo Kaya: Laptop	Charles	
2018	Alamat Ng Ano	Toby	
2018	Maalaala Mo Kaya: Dalandan	Lolong	
2018	Ngayon at Kailanman	Carl	
2019	The Killer Bride	Marvin Cruz	
2019	Maalala Mo Kaya: Divet	Jerry	
2020	Ipaglaban Mo!: Ungol	Manny	
2020	A Soldier's Heart	rebel	guest role
2020	Maalaala Mo Kaya: Medal	Joseph	
2020	I Am U	Jarred	TV airing
2020	Eat Bulaga!	Himself	Guest
2020	It's Showtime!	Himself	Guest
2020	Sunday Noontime Live!	Himself	Guest
2020	Stay-In Love	Mon Ortega	Main role
2021	Gameboys	Gavreel Mendoza Alarcon	Main role (TV airing)
2021; 2022; 2023–present	All-Out Sundays	Himself	Guest (2021 and 2022); Mainstay performer / various roles (since 2023)
2021	Dear Uge: K-Pak Ghorl	Pedro	
2021–2022	Pepito Manaloto: Ang Unang Kuwento	Patricio "Patrick" Generoso	Supporting role
2021	Regal Studio Presents: Ikaw si Ako, Ako si Ikaw	Marco	
2022–present	Bubble Gang	Himself	Cast member / mainstay
2022	Magpakailanman: The Blind Runner	Mark Joseph "Aga" Casidsid	Main role
2022	Daig Kayo ng Lola Ko: Papa Pig	Prince Stu Pig	
2022; 2024	Running Man Philippines	Himself	Cast member / contestant / Season 2 Winner
2023	Magpakailanman: A Son's Promise	Himself	Main role
2023	Daddy's Gurl	Mr. Eskupido	Guest role
2023	The Write One	Intoy	Supporting role
2023	Voltes V: Legacy	Harvey Perez	Supporting role
2023–2024	Eat Bulaga!	Himself	Co-host / mainstay
2024	Tahanang Pinakamasaya	Himself	Co-host / mainstay
2024	It's Showtime	Himself	Guest
2024	Ok Ako		Main role
2025	Mga Batang Riles	Kulot Canlas	Main role
2025	Pepito Manaloto: Tuloy na Kuwento	Young Patricio Generoso	Guest
2026	Magpakailanman: The Kokoy De Santos Story	Himself	Main role
2026	House of Lies	Jobert Castillo	Supporting role
2026	Family Feud	Himself	Contestant
2026	Barangay Love Stories: 'Di Ko Maiwasan	Dylan	Main role

=== Web series ===
Year	Title	Role	Notes
2020	I Am U	Jarred	
2020	Pearl Next Door	Gavreel Mendoza Alarcon	
2020	Oh, Mando!	Armando "Mando" Deputado Jr.	Main role
2020	Gameboys	Gavreel Mendoza Alarcon	Main role
2021	Love vs Stars	Caloy	Main role
2022	Gameboys 2	Gavreel Mendoza Alarcon	Main role

== Awards and nominations ==
Year	Award ceremony	Category	Nominee(s) / work(s)	Result	Ref.
2020	RAWR Awards	Beshie Ng Taon	I Am U	Nominated	
2020	PUSH Music Awards	Push Breakthrough Star of 2020	Himself	Nominated	
2024	Asian Academy Creative Awards	Best Actor	Your Mother's Son	Won	
2024	Metro Manila Film Festival	Best Supporting Actor	And the Breadwinner Is...	Nominated	
