= Gameboys =

Philippine web series

- Promotional poster
- Genre: Romance; Drama; Boys' love
- Written by: Ash M. Malanum
- Directed by: Ivan Andrew Payawal
- Starring: Kokoy de Santos; Elijah Canlas
- Music by: Emerzon Texon
- Ending theme: "Panalo Ka" by Dex Yu
- Country of origin: Philippines
- Original languages: Tagalog (Filipino); English
- No. of seasons: 2
- No. of episodes: 14

Production
- Executive producers: Perci Intalan; Jun Robles Lana
- Production location: Philippines
- Running time: 10–39 minutes
- Production company: The IdeaFirst Company

Original release
- Network: YouTube
- Release: May 22 – September 13, 2020

Gameboys is a 2020 Philippine boys' love web series directed by Ivan Andrew Payawal and written by Ash M. Malanum. Presented as a screenlife film, it stars Kokoy de Santos and Elijah Canlas as two boys—a live-stream gamer and his fan—who found each other online during the 2020 COVID-19 pandemic and the Luzon Island community quarantine.

== Plot ==
During the 2020 COVID-19 pandemic Luzon quarantine, live-stream gamer Cairo Lazaro (Caimazing) loses to Gavreel Alarcon (Angel2000) in an online game. When Cairo invites Gavreel for a rematch, Gavreel confesses his love for Cairo and asks for a date with Cairo in return. Although Gavreel wins the rematch and continues to express his love for Cairo, Cairo is hesitant to express his feelings. While both of them slowly bond with each other, Cairo also befriends Pearl, Gavreel's ex-girlfriend and now best friend. Meanwhile, Cairo is having family problems as his father was hospitalized because of coronavirus infection.

Terrence, the ex-boyfriend of Gavreel, tries to get back with Gavreel after he recently broke up with his girlfriend. In an attempt, Terrence creates a rift between Gavreel and Cairo by making Cairo believe that Gavreel used his grandmother, Lola Cora, who died the year prior, to be with Cairo. Later, Cairo realizes his mistake of believing Terrence, and apologizes to Gavreel. Terrence was later confronted by Gavreel, Cairo and Pearl in a group meeting where Gavreel reiterates to Terrence that he will not go back to a relationship with him, and that he is in love with Cairo.

Just when things are getting better between Cairo and Gavreel, Cairo learns from his older brother, London, that their father is not doing well. Cairo feels guilty about his father's situation. It turned out that Cairo ran away from their home, and his father was infected with the virus while looking for him. The story further reveals the reason why Cairo ran away: Risa, Cairo's former best friend who had a crush on him, outed him as gay to his family and friends on social media. Unable to face his family about his sexuality, Cairo ran away from home. Later, Cairo's mother, Leila, tearfully informed him that his father has died.

Gavreel and Pearl continue to support Cairo through his mourning on his father's demise. Both Terrence and Risa apologize for their mistakes and the troubles they caused in Cairo's and Gavreel's lives. Meanwhile, Leila decided to move the family to Bukidnon province, which Cairo hesitantly agrees. Cairo finally confesses his interest for Gavreel. Thereafter, Cairo and Gavreel meet in person for the first time with Pearl's help.

== Cast and characters ==
=== Main ===
- Elijah Canlas as Cairo Lazaro, a live-stream gamer with the username, Caimazing, being pursued by an unknown gamer and fan, Angel2000.
- Kokoy de Santos as Gavreel Mendoza Alarcon, an unknown gamer with the username, Angel2000; Cairo's fan and secret admirer.

=== Recurring ===
- Adrianna So as Pearl Gatdula, Gavreel's ex-girlfriend who later became best friend.
- Kyle Velino as Terrence Carreon, Gavreel's ex-boyfriend, Wesley’s lover, and Cairo's online game rival with the username, GavreelsOnlyLove.
- Jerom Canlas as London Lazaro, Cairo's older brother.
- Miggy Jimenez as Wesley Torres, Terrence’s lover, and Cairo's childhood friend with the username, masterwesley.
- Sue Prado as Leila Lazaro, Cairo's mother.
- Rommel Canlas as Arthur Lazaro, Cairo's deceased father.
- Angeli Nicole Sanoy as Risa Vargas, Cairo's friend.
- Kych Minemoto as Achilles De Dios, Terrence's former fling and now close friend.

== Episodes ==
=== Season 1 ===
No.	Title	Directed by	Written by	Original release date
1	"Pass or Play?"	Ivan Andrew Payawal	Ash M. Malanum	May 22, 2020
Cairo is raring for a rematch after his sudden defeat in a popular mobile game. But his opponent Gavreel wants something in return.
2	"Game of Love"	Ivan Andrew Payawal	Ash M. Malanum	June 3, 2020
As Cairo weighs in on Gavreel’s condition for a rematch, he discovers something about his opponent that will taint his trust in him.
3	"Strangers Online"	Ivan Andrew Payawal	Ash M. Malanum	June 12, 2020
Gavreel is eager to regain Cairo’s trust after a misunderstanding. But Cairo, who is still hurting from what he learned about Gavreel, won’t make it easy for him.
4	"One Who is Victorious"	Ivan Andrew Payawal	Ash M. Malanum	June 19, 2020
As Gavreel and Cairo’s relationship continues to grow further, a part of Gavreel’s past will come back to haunt him.
5	"Thrill of the Chase"	Ivan Andrew Payawal	Ash M. Malanum	June 26, 2020
With Terrence coming into the picture, Cairo starts to question his place in Gav’s heart.
6	"Secret Party"	Ivan Andrew Payawal	Ash M. Malanum	July 3, 2020
As Cairo contemplates on making up to Gavreel, Terrence makes his next move.
7	"Elephant in the Room"	Ivan Andrew Payawal	Ash M. Malanum	July 10, 2020
Terrence's burning question sends Cairo and Gavreel into further confusion. Will they finally confront the reality of their relationship?
8	"No Matter What"	Ivan Andrew Payawal	Ash M. Malanum	July 17, 2020
Gavreel tries to reach out to Cairo who remains elusive and inconsolable after his father's demise. Will this tragedy bring them together or pull them apart?
9	"Say It With Love"	Ivan Andrew Payawal	Ash M. Malanum	July 24, 2020
Cairo comes into terms with his identity and realizes how deeply he has fallen for Gavreel. Their longing to be together intensifies as they also try to grapple with the reality of their situation.
10	"Pass or Play 2"	Ivan Andrew Payawal	Ash M. Malanum	July 31, 2020
With his family moving away from the city, Cairo decides to finally meet Gavreel in person. Is this the start or the end of their relationship?
11	"Stay Strong Forever"	Ivan Andrew Payawal	Ash M. Malanum	August 23, 2020
Now that Gav and Cairo have met, what will happen next in their relationship?
12	"Jealousy In The Air"	Ivan Andrew Payawal	Ash M. Malanum	August 30, 2020
Wesley’s sudden reappearance in Cairo’s life makes Gavreel question their relationship.
13	"Crossing The Line"	Ivan Andrew Payawal	Ash M. Malanum	September 13, 2020
With an unresolved issue still hanging over their heads, will Cairo and Gavreel's story find its happy ever after?
13.5	"Alt Gameboys"	Perci Intalan	Ash M. Malanum	September 20, 2020
As Terrence continues his online search for someone to talk to, he makes his way to the dark side of the internet and online dating.

=== Season 2 ===
No.	Title	Directed by	Written by	Original release date
1	"Hi, Lovebirds"	Ivan Andrew Payawal	Ash M. Malanum	July 30, 2021
2	"Work in Progress"	Ivan Andrew Payawal	Ash M. Malanum	July 30, 2021
3	"Feel at Home"	Perci Intalan	Ash M. Malanum	July 30, 2021
4	"A Welcome Surprise"	Perci Intalan	Ash M. Malanum	July 30, 2021
5	"Chip on the Shoulder"	Perci Intalan	Ash M. Malanum	July 30, 2021
6	"Bad News"	Perci Intalan	Ash M. Malanum	July 30, 2021
7	"No Matter What"	Perci Intalan	Ash M. Malanum	July 30, 2021
8	"No Matter What 2"	Perci Intalan	Ash M. Malanum	July 30, 2021

== Production ==
=== Development ===
On July 15, 2020, The IdeaFirst Company announced that Globe Telecom's cellular service brand, TM, will be presenting the series' episodes. On August 21, 2020, Bench, a Philippine clothing brand, was also announced on social media as the newest sponsor of the series.

A few hours before the premiere of Episode 9, "Say It With Love", series writer, Ash M. Malanum, tweeted that three more episodes would be added to the series bringing the total episodes to 13. However, the release of these episodes was delayed by two weeks after the Philippine government decided on August 2, 2020 to revert Metro Manila and nearby provinces to Modified Enhanced Community Quarantine (MECQ).

=== Filming ===
The first nine episodes of the series were shot completely online because of quarantine restrictions. Main actors Elijah, Kokoy, Adrianna and Kyle were asked to set up the frames and do their makeup themselves and Ivan directing the shots online. Family members of Kokoy De Santos and Elijah Canlas were also credited for helping with the production as the actors themselves act in their home. Elijah's brother Jerom and father Rommel also acted in the series as the brother and father character of Cairo, respectively.

=== Future ===
The IdeaFirst Company announced that it would be making a Gameboys spin-off series entitled “Pearl Next Door” on June 19, 2020. Adrianna So would reprise her role as the eponymous character, with Iana Bernardez, Philip Hernandez, Rachel Coates and Cedrick Juan joining the cast.

On September 13, 2020, after the premiere of the Season 1 Finale, the IdeaFirst Company announced that the series would have a second season. Prior to this announcement, the production company announced that it would make a movie adaptation of the series. On January 22, 2021, an official teaser for the second season was released on the IdeaFirst Company's YouTube Channel in collaboration with P-Pop boyband group's SB19 single 'Hanggang sa Huli'.

According to The IdeaFirst Company, the second season was scheduled to be released on May 22, 2022 to coincide the "World Gameboys Day."

== Release ==
=== YouTube ===
The first episode, "Pass or Play", premiered on YouTube on May 22, 2020 at 8:00 PM (Philippine Standard Time). The series is considered the first Filipino BL drama to be produced by a professional media outlet.

On September 20, 2020, "Alt Gameboys" (Episode 13.5) was released dedicated to Terrence's journey into the dark side of the internet and online dating, notoriously referred to as Alter (short for Alternate) World. Directed by Perci Intalan, it also introduces a new character, Achilles De Dios.

=== Netflix ===
On November 23, 2020, Netflix Philippines' Twitter account announced that a Level-Up Edition will be released globally starting December 30, 2020. In keeping up with the “Level-Up Edition”, original scenes were refreshed and re-shot with additional footage, new correspondence and “Vidgram” stories from the characters never been seen before. In this version the first two episodes are re-edited into a single episode (titled "Pass or Play?") and consequently all subsequent episodes of the season are renumbered. "AltGameboys"—originally numbered 13.5—is presented as episode 13.

=== Television ===
The TV broadcast premiered on June 13, 2021 through Heart of Asia Channel in all Digital TV Boxes Nationwide.

=== Film ===
On July 31, 2021, Gameboys: The Movie was released.

== Reception ==
Leo Balante of Rank Magazine wrote, "In Gameboys, there are neither high-octane action, knee-slapping comedy, nor teleserye drama. Neither does it have fancy camera work, visual effects, nor A-listers as leads. All the viewers saw are two young men, in and out of video calls, portraying various levels of onscreen chase, before leading to a denouement that brought viewers to feel, think, and believe in a new order that is beautiful and possible."

The movie was featured on Teen Vogue's best BL dramas of 2021 list.

== Music ==
Song title	Performed by	Lyrics by	Music by	Release date	Platforms
"Isang Laro"	Nasser / Kokoy De Santos	Emerzon Texon	Emerzon Texon	May 29, 2020	YouTube and Spotify
"Panalo Ka"	Dex Yu	Emerzon Texon	Emerzon Texon	June 23, 2020	YouTube and Spotify
"Pag-Asa"	Elijah Canlas	Emerzon Texon	Emerzon Texon	July 1, 2020	YouTube
"Angel of Peace"	Elijah Canlas	Elijah Canlas	Emerzon Texon	July 3, 2020	YouTube
"Hiling"	Joshua Ronett	Emerzon Texon & Elmer Gatchalian	Emerzon Texon	July 7, 2020	YouTube
"My Kind of Love"	Elora Españo	Emerzon Texon	Emerzon Texon	July 10, 2020	YouTube
"Ngayon"	Emerzon Texon feat. Dex Yu	Emerzon Texon	Emerzon Texon	August 7, 2020	YouTube and Spotify
"Ikaw at Ako"	Emerzon Texon feat. Joshua Ronett	Emerzon Texon	Emerzon Texon	August 23, 2020	YouTube

== Awards and nominations ==
- Best Web Series (Indie Shorts Awards Seoul, 2020)
- Kids: Live Action (International Emmy Kids Awards Nominee, 2021)

=== Official Selection ===
- Vancouver Independent Film Festival, 2020
- Los Angeles Asian Film Festival, 2020
- Indie Shorts Awards Buenos Aires, 2020
- Amsterdam World International Film Festival, 2020

== See also ==
- Oh, Mando!
