= Always Yours, Never Mine =

2026 film by Cathy Garcia-Sampana

- Theatrical release poster
- Directed by: Cathy Garcia-Sampana
- Screenplay by: Vanessa R. Valdez
- Story by: Olivia M. Lamasan; Trishtan Perez; Vanessa R. Valdez
- Produced by: Kara U. Kintanar; Daniel S. Saniana
- Starring: Joshua Garcia; Julia Barretto
- Cinematography: Neil Bion
- Edited by: Marya Ignacio
- Music by: Jessie Q. Lasaten
- Production companies: ABS-CBN Studios; Star Cinema
- Distributed by: ABS-CBN Film Productions
- Release date: 30 September 2026
- Running time: 112 minutes
- Country: Philippines
- Language: Filipino
- Box office: ₱121 million

Always Yours, Never Mine is a 2026 Philippine romantic drama film directed by Cathy Garcia-Sampana and written by Vanessa R. Valdez from a story she co-developed with Olivia M. Lamasan and Trishtan Perez. Starring Joshua Garcia and Julia Barretto in their first film since Un/Happy for You two years earlier, the story follows two lovers whose relationship spans thirty years of missed opportunities and eventually leads them to face the difficult decisions that have permanently separated them.

Produced by ABS-CBN Studios and ABS-CBN Film Productions, the film was released theatrically in the Philippines on 30 September 2026.

== Plot ==
Apollo and Luna have kept crossing paths for three decades, where they almost became together but never succeeded. When they crossed paths again, there would be another chance to be really together.

== Cast ==
- Joshua Garcia as Apollo
- Julia Barretto as Luna
- Chanda Romero as Lola Mila
- Bianca Umali as Gaea
- Joy Barcoma as Daisy
- Karen Reyes as Nella
- Bob Jbeili as Emman
- Migs Almendras as Christian
- Ina Raymundo as Annabelle
- Franco Laurel as Roger
- Reign Parani as Karen
- Paulo Angeles as Migs
- Paolo Gumabao
- Jan Silverio as Wilson

== Themes and allusions ==
Vanessa R. Valdez, one of the film's writers, stated that the title alludes to the complex phases of the relationship between Garcia and Barretto's respective characters, where it represents a connection that endures, even if it never completely develops into their ideal, and that characteristic is what rejuvenates their relationship..

== Production ==
Always Yours, Never Mine, which reunited Garcia and Barretto after Un/Happy for You in 2024, was first announced on social media on 12 August 2026 with a screen test. It also served as a reunion of Garcia with director Cathy Garcia-Sampana, following Meet, Greet & Bye a year earlier. Bianca Umali, an actress from Sparkle, and Joy Barcoma, former Miss Philippines Earth 2025, joined the project, which served as their first film with Star Cinema.

The film's official poster was unveiled in Calle Crisologo, Vigan, Ilocos Sur, on 2 September 2026, with the presence of the two main stars alongside supporting stars: Karen Reyes, Bob Jbeili, Migs Almendras, Paulo Angeles, and Joy Barcoma.

== Release ==
Aside from a domestic release on September 30, the film was screened on October 22 in the United Arab Emirates, Qatar, Bahrain, Australia, and New Zealand; on October 23 in the United States, Canada, and Guam; on October 31 in the United Kingdom and Austria; and on November 1 in Spain, France, and Italy.

== Reception ==
=== Box office ===
Always Yours, Never Mine earned ₱100 million as of October 11, 2026.
