= Paulo Angeles =

Filipino actor, singer and dancer (born 1997)

- Born: Miguel Paulo Angeles; October 27, 1997 (age 29); Pampanga, Philippines
- Other name: Paolo Angeles
- Education: Trinity University of Asia
- Occupations: Actor; singer; dancer
- Years active: 2014–present
- Agent(s): Star Magic (2014–2025); MQuest Ventures and Star Worx (2025–present)
- Height: 5 ft 10 in (1.78 m)
- Website: Paulo Angeles on Instagram

Miguel Paulo Detera Angeles (born October 27, 1997) is a Filipino actor, singer and dancer. Angeles is a talent of ABS-CBN under Star Magic. Angeles was first seen on TV via Mirabella, a Philippine melodramatic fantasy television series in 2014. In 2015, Angeles became a member of It's Showtime's Kilig Ambassadors: Hashtags.

He portrayed the antagonist role in Para sa Isa't Isa (2025–2026) as Gilbert Bambano and his protagonist role in Baker's Heart (2025) as Daniel

== Early life and education ==
Angeles was born in Pampanga, Philippines, and attended Trinity University of Asia in Quezon City for his college studies. He began his entertainment career at a young age before returning to school as an adult to finish his degree.

== Acting career ==
Angeles his path to the entertainment industry solidified in 2014 when he was scouted and signed as an official talent by ABS-CBN's talent management arm, Star Magic. He made his very first television appearance in 2014 through the fantasy-drama series Mirabella. Shortly after his debut, his career gained major momentum in 2015 when he was selected to be a member of Hashtags, the popular all-male dance group on the midday variety show It's Showtime.

His major acting breakthrough arrived in 2018 when he played Frederico "Red" De Alegre in the daytime drama Precious Hearts Romances Presents: Araw Gabi. He followed this with prominent supporting parts in primetime dramas, including Ang sa Iyo ay Akin 2020–2021 as Gelo and FPJ's Ang Probinsyano 2021 as P/Lt. Jim de Castro.

In 2025, Angeles left ABS-CBN's Star Magic after over a decade to sign with MQuest Ventures and Star Worx, the production and talent management arms of the MediaQuest Group and TV5.

In 2026, part of the supporting cast in the Star Cinema romantic drama film Always Yours, Never Mine, directed by Cathy Garcia-Sampana and starring Joshua Garcia and Julia Barretto.

== Personal life ==
Angeles is continuing his studies at Trinity University of Asia, taking up BS Marketing.

== Acting credits ==
=== Film ===
Key
†	Denotes films that have not yet been released

Paulo Angeles's film credits with year of release, film titles and roles
Year	Title	Role	Ref.
2016	Just the 3 of Us	EJ Manalo	
2017	Love You to the Stars and Back	Kenneth	
2017	You with Me	Timmy	
2018	So Connected	Enzo	
2019	Sakaling Maging Tayo	Emerson "Emer" Igcasan	
2019	G!	Bryan	
2019	Santigwar	Jay	
2025	The Last Resort	Marco	
2025	Manila's Finest	Reman	
2026	Always Yours, Never Mine	Migs	

=== Television ===
Key
†	Denotes shows that have not yet been aired

Paulo Angeles's television credits with year of release, title(s) and role
Year	Title	Role	Ref.
2014	Mirabella	Nico	
2014	Maalaala Mo Kaya: Notebook	Michael	
2014	Sana Bukas pa ang Kahapon	Ryan	
2014	Maalaala Mo Kaya: Salamin	Janno	
2014–2015	Dream Dad	Manuel Castro	
2015	It's Showtime	Himself – Dancer / Performer	
2015	Maalaala Mo Kaya: Bottled Water	Joey	
2016	Minute To Win It: Last Man Standing	Himself – Player / Contestant	
2016	Family Feud	Himself – Player / Contestant	
2016	Pinoy Big Brother: Lucky Season 7	Himself / House Guest	
2016–2017	Langit Lupa	Ivan	
2016–present	ASAP	Himself – Performer / co-host	
2017	Ipaglaban Mo: Kapatiran	Justin	
2017	Ipaglaban Mo: Houseboys	Nonong	
2017–2018	La Luna Sangre	Mark	
2018	Ipaglaban Mo: Hazing	Jomar	
2018	Precious Hearts Romances Presents: Araw Gabi	Frederico "Red" De Alegre Jr. / Frederico "Red" Mamaril	
2018	Ipaglaban Mo: Teritoryo	Ralph	
2019	Maalaala Mo Kaya: Journal	John Hennesy Olivas	
2019	Parasite Island	Miggy Salvacion	
2019	Taiwan That You Love	Eric	
2020	Sunday Noontime Live!	Himself – Guest performer	
2020	Bawal Lumabas: The Series	Onyx	
2020–2021	Ang sa Iyo ay Akin	Angelo "Gelo" Marasigan	
2021	Magandang Buhay	Himself / Guest	
2021	Maalaala Mo Kaya: Prologue of Love	Carl	
2021	FPJ's Ang Probinsyano	P/Lt. Jim de Castro	
2022	Suntok sa Buwan	Barok	
2022	Sunday's Best Special: Star Magic All Star Game 2022	Himself / Player	
2023	Replacing Chef Chico	Juancho	
2024–2025	Ang Himala ni Niño: Unang Libro ng Niña Niño	Noli	
2025	Para sa Isa't Isa	Gilbert Bambano	
2025	Baker's Heart	Daniel	
2025–present	Vibe+	Himself – performer / co-host	

== Accolades ==
Year	Film Awards/ Critics	Awards	Nominated work	Result	Ref.
2016	8th PMPC Star Awards for Music	Dance Album of the Year	Hashtags	Won	
