= Diana Mackey =

Filipino actress and model

- Born: Cabanatuan City, Nueva Ecija, Philippines
- Occupations: Actress, model, beauty queen
- Years active: 2019–present
- Spouse: Kiefer Ravena (m. 2025)

Diana Mackey is a Filipino actress, model, and beauty queen. She gained national attention as a contestant on StarStruck and later competed in Binibining Pilipinas in 2022, representing Nueva Ecija.

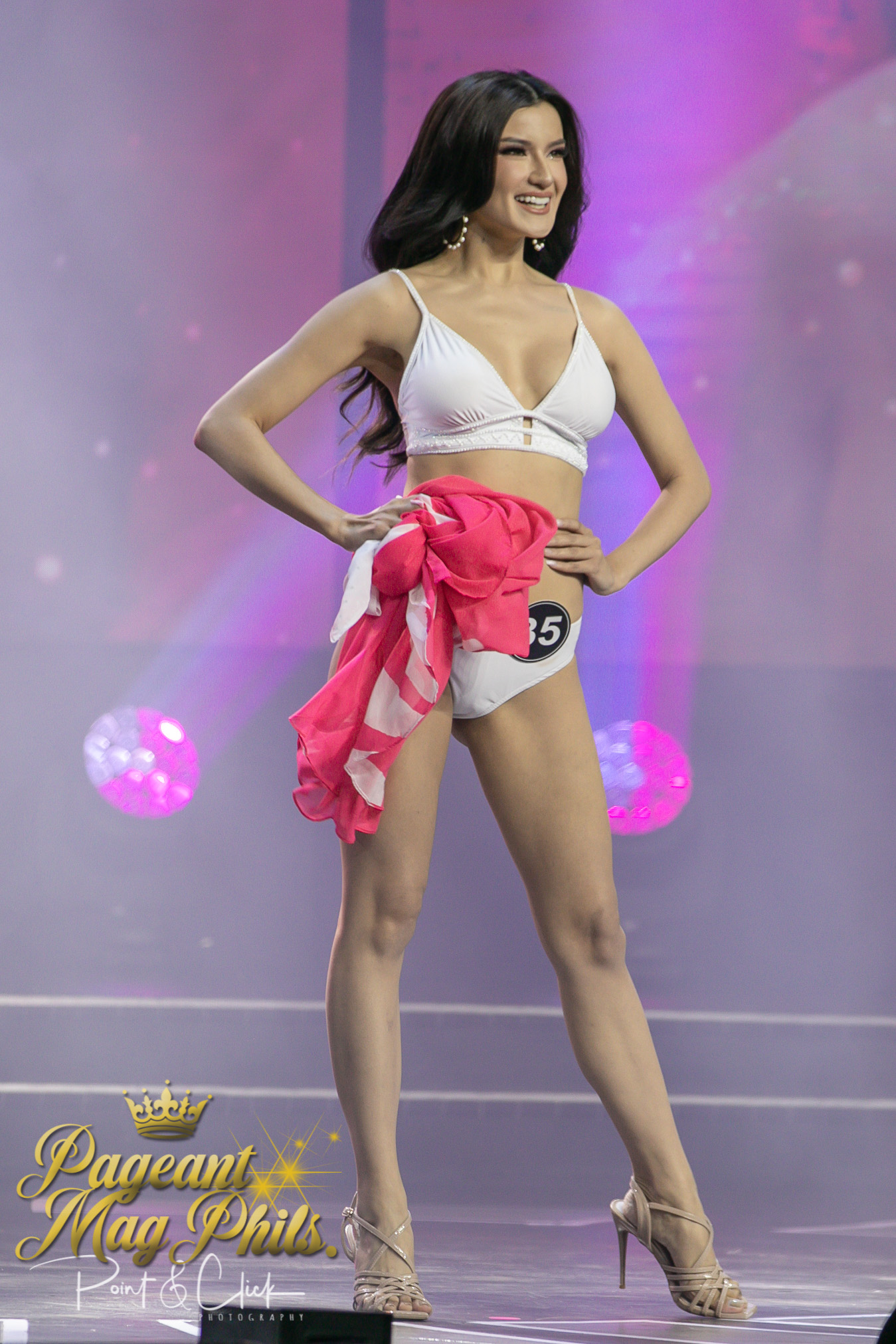
Diana Mackey during Binibining Pilipinas 2022

== Career ==
Mackey began her showbiz career as one of the finalists in the reality talent search StarStruck. She went on to appear in television shows, including:

- Pinoy Big Brother: Otso
- FPJ's Ang Probinsyano
- Maalaala Mo Kaya
- Fit Check: Confessions of an Ukay Queen
- Section: St. Valentine – The Disappearance of Divine

She also competed in Binibining Pilipinas 2022, where she represented Nueva Ecija and placed among the Top 12 finalists.

== Personal life ==
She hails from Cabanatuan City, Nueva Ecija. In 2023, she married professional basketball player Kiefer Ravena in Kyoto, Japan.
