= 2017 FAMAS Awards =

Annual Filipino film awards ceremony

65th FAMAS Awards
- 65th FAMAS Awards Logo
- Date: December 28, 2017
- Site: Philippine Social Science Center Auditorium
- Produced by: Airtime Marketing

Highlights
- Best Picture: Barcelona: A Love Untold

The 65th Filipino Academy of Movie Arts and Sciences is the annual honors given by the Filipino Academy of Movie Arts and Sciences (FAMAS), an organization composed of prize-winning writers and movie columnists, for achievements in the Philippine cinema for a past year. The awards Night was held at Philippine Social Science Center Auditorium, Quezon City. on December 28, 2017.

Star Cinema's Barcelona: A Love Untold is the biggest winner with four awards, including Best Picture, Best Director for Olivia Lamasan, Best Actor for Daniel Padilla, and Best Production Design for Shari Marie Montiague. Coming in close with at least two awards is The Unmarried Wife, also by Star Cinema. It took home the Best Actress Award for Angelica Panganiban and Best Screenplay for Vanessa Valdez.

== Awards ==
=== Major Awards ===
Winners are listed first and highlighted with boldface.

Best Picture	Best Director
**Barcelona: A Love Untold (Star Cinema)**; Everything About Her (Star Cinema); Kusina (Cinemalaya Foundation and Cinematografica Films); The Unmarried Wife (Star Cinema); Ringgo: The Dog Shooter	**Olivia M. Lamasan (Barcelona: A Love Untold)**; Joyce Bernal, for Everything About Her; Maryo J. de los Reyes for The Unmarried Wife; Mel Chionglo for Iadya Mo Kami; Rahyan Carlos for Ringgo: The Dog Shooter
Best Actor	Best Actress
**Daniel Padilla for Barcelona: A Love Untold**; Dingdong Dantes for The Unmarried Wife; Joshua Garcia for Vince and Kath and James; Joem Bascon for Kusina; Sandino Martin for Ringgo	**Angelica Panganiban for The Unmarried Wife**; Kathryn Bernardo for Barcelona: A Love Untold; Angel Locsin for Everything About Her; Janice De Belen for Ringgo
Best Supporting Actor	Best Supporting Actress
**Ricky Davao for Iadya Mo Kami**; Joshua Garcia for Barcelona: A Love Untold; Nico Gomez, for Ku’te; Paulo Avelino for The Unmarried Wife; Ronnie Alonte for Vince and Kath and James	**Liza Diño for Ringgo: The Dog Shooter**; Aiko Melendez for Barcelona: A Love Untold; Dimples Romana for The Unmarried Wife; Marielle Therese for Ku'te; Meg Imperial for Higanti
Best Child Performer	Best Screenplay
**Lance Lucido for Ringgo: The Dog Shooter**; AJ Urquia for Vince and Kath and James'; Lei Navarro for The Unmarried Wife; Sean Gabriel for Everything About Her	**Vanessa Valdez for The Unmarried Wife**; Carmi Raymundo & Olivia M Lamasan for Barcelona: A Love Untold; Daisy Cayanan, Kim Noromor and Anjanette Haw for Vince and Kath and James; Irene Emma Villamor for Everything About Her; Robby Tantingco for Area
Best Cinematography	Best Production Design
**Rain Yamson for Area**; Jun Gonzalez for The Unmarried Wife; Hermann Claravall for Barcelona: A Love Untold; Lee Meily for Kusina; Mycko David for Iadya Mo Kami	**Shari Marie Montiague for Barcelona: A Love Untold**; Winston Acuyong for The Unmarried Wife; Joey Luna for Everything About Her; Aimi Geraldine Gamboa for Vince and Kath and James; Ericson Navarro for Kusina
Best Editing	Best Story
**Beng Bandong for Vince and Kath and James**; Tara Illenberger for The Unmarried Wife; Marya Ignacio & Joyce Bernal for Everything About Her; Marya Ignacio for Barcelona: A Love Untold; Thop Nazareno for Kusina; Jesus Navarro for Iadya Mo Kami	**Rahyan Carlos, 'Ringgo: The Dog Shooter'**; Carmi Raymundo & Olivia M Lamasan for Barcelona: A Love Untold; Daisy Cayanan, Kim Noromor, & Anjanette Haw for Vince and Kath and James; Romualdo Avellanosa & Roni Bertubin for Ku'te'; Vanessa R. Valdez for The Unmarried Wife
Best Sound	Best Musical Score
**Aurel Claro Bilbao for Everything About Her**; Arnel Labayo for The Unmarried Wife; Aurel Claro Bilbao for Barcelona: A Love Untold; Aurel Claro Bilbao for Vince and Kath and James; Raffy Magsaysay for Kusina	**Karl Ramirez for Bubog**; Jesse Lucas for The Unmarried Wife; Carmina Robles-Cuya for Everything About Her; Cesar Francis Concio for Barcelona: A Love Untold; Jessie Lasaten for Vince and Kath and James; Emerson Texon for Iadya Mo Kami
Best Theme Song
**"Higanti" by Demie Fresco for Higanti**; "Someday" by Juris for The Unmarried Wife; "Something I Need" by Piolo Pascual and Morissette for Everything About Her; "Hey Crush" by Joshua Garcia for Vince and Kath and James; "Sana Ako Nalang" by Robert Delgado for Ku'te

=== Special awards ===
German Moreno Youth Achievement Award

- Maine Mendoza
- Ivan Dorschner

FAMAS Lifetime Achievement Award

- Susan Roces
- Amalia Fuentes

Fernando Poe Jr. Memorial Award

- Dingdong Dantes

Dr. Jose Perez Memorial Award

- Dolly Ann Carvajal

Arturo M. Padua Memorial Award

- Ronald King Constantino

Outstanding Producer

- Donna Sanchez

Outstanding Wellness Organic Producer

- Lite Premium Healthy Drinks
