= Replacing Chef Chico =

Philippine romantic drama television series

- Genre: Romantic drama
- Created by: Antoinette Jadaone
- Directed by: Dan Villegas
- Country of origin: Philippines
- Original languages: Filipino; English
- No. of episodes: 8

Production
- Running time: 32–36 minutes
- Production companies: Project 8 CS Studios

Original release
- Network: Netflix
- Release: November 24, 2023

Replacing Chef Chico is a Philippine romantic drama television series created by Antoinette Jadaone. The series follows Ella, a sous-chef in a Filipino fine dining restaurant who became the head chef when the original head chef fell into a coma, who along with the newly hired consultant is tasked in keeping the restaurant from closing down. The series premiered on Netflix on November 24, 2023. It is the first Filipino-produced Netflix Original series and the first to be shot in 4K.

== Synopsis ==
Hain is a fine dining restaurant that serves Filipino cuisine and is run by the ill-tempered head chef Chico. Raymond, a consultant, tries to intervene in the restaurant's management to save Hain from financial ruin despite Chico's refusal to accept any changes in the menu. When Chico is left comatose following an accident, Ella, Hain's sous-chef, finds herself managing the restaurant as interim head chef and struggling to comprehend her relationships with Chico and Raymond, while individual customers play out their stories at Hain.

== Cast and characters ==
- Sam Milby as Chef Chico
- Alessandra De Rossi as Ella Robles
- Piolo Pascual as Raymond Soler
- Joel Saracho as Carlon
- Yesh Burce as Wena
- Angie Castrence as Ditas
- Paulo Angeles as Juancho
- DMs Boongaling as Rye
- Frances Makil-Ignacio as Boss

== Episodes ==
No.	Title	Directed by	Written by	Original release date
1	"Episode 1"	Dan Villegas	Antoinette Jadaone	November 24, 2023
Ella is the sous chef at Hain, a fine dining restaurant known for serving personalized courses. The short-tempered head chef, Chico, is resistant to the attempts of consultant Raymond's attempts to improve the business, which is struggling to survive and drives up tensions between Chico and his estranged father. Despite some setbacks, the Hain team successfully serves Tessa, a wealthy woman who is dying of cancer, and her group of friends. At the dinner, Tessa announces her decision to give up treatment and retire to Italy to await her death, while her friends criticize her decision and her insistence on ordering kare-kare and other unhealthy meals. As her friends try to reason with her, Tessa dares them to abandon her, which they are unable to do and instead come to her support. As Chico drops Ella off, she tells him to end things with his girlfriend so they can be together; Chico later gets into a car accident after being distracted by a message from Ella.
2	"Episode 2"	Dan Villegas	Antoinette Jadaone and Kristine Gabriel	November 24, 2023
With Chico comatose, Ella and a veteran chef, Carlon, lock heads over who to manage the restaurant on a temporary basis. Chico's mother, known by her initials VLG, orders Raymond to observe Ella and see if she can manage Hain in Chico's absence. Carlon and Ella serve Kapampangan cuisine to an elderly couple consisting of Wilfredo, an accomplished chef, and her wife Marie. Wilfredo disparages Hain over the course of their meal, berates Ella for a badly-prepared tibok-tibok and accuses the staff of stealing his phone, only to walk out in embarrassment when he is told that he had forgotten it in the toilet. While Wilfredo is away, his wife Marie apologizes on his behalf to Ella and reveals that he is only lashing out over his Alzheimer's diagnosis. A moved Ella makes amends by serving a better version of tibok-tibok on the house, saving the couple's dinner and marriage. After closing time, Raymond comforts Ella and recommends to VLG that she be retained.
3	"Episode 3"	Dan Villegas	Shaira Advincula and Antoinette Jadaone	November 24, 2023
Ella and Carlon continue their rivalry as they make competing adobo dishes to a woman named Tina and her husband's mistress Brittany, who are awaiting their common partner David in the same table, with the staff anticipating a confrontation. Carlon abandons his adobo when he finds he does not have the right ingredients, only for Ella to improvise and ensure the order is served. Impressed with their meals, Tina and Brittany become friends and leave a note to David saying that they are leaving him. Arriving late, he is asked to pay the bill upon his arrival as the women have left. After observing the day's events, Raymond decides to make Ella the interim head chef. After closing time, Ella visits Chico in hospital, only to encounter his fiancée, whose exact relationship Chico did not disclose.
4	"Episode 4"	Dan Villegas	Shaira Advincula and Antoinette Jadaone	November 24, 2023
Ella struggles to assert her authority over the kitchen while dealing with Chico's cheating and a power outage in Hain. An elderly woman, Concha, dines at Hain to celebrate her birthday. Ella serves her arroz caldo and listens to how she has been ignored by her grown-up children and separated from her husband and is now seeking a new relationship with another man. Upon hearing this, Ella is emboldened to stand her ground in the kitchen this time, while Concha asserts her decision to find love again to her children. After closing time, Ella opens up her relationship with Chico to Raymond and agrees to the latter's proposal to change the menu in order to save Hain.
5	"Episode 5"	Dan Villegas	Shaira Advincula and Antoinette Jadaone	November 24, 2023
Raymond begins supplying Hain using his contacts, to Ella's cautious approval. Ella informs the staff of Raymond's proposed changes to the menu, saying that it is necessary for Hain's survival. Wena, the head waitress and receptionist, struggles to maintain her composure when her young son Jake, along with her former partner Henry, dines at Hain before they leave for Japan. After taking their orders, Wena breaks down in front of Ella, explaining that she was impregnated as a teenager and left Jake as an infant to Henry's family due to her dire financial situation, leaving him with no memory of her mother. A touched Ella cooks turon for Jake, allowing Wena, who serves the dish, to reconnect with him without revealing her true identity. As the staff agree to Raymond's proposed changes and celebrate, a recovered Chico suddenly arrives.
6	"Episode 6"	Dan Villegas	Fatrick Tabada and Antoinette Jadaone	November 24, 2023
Chico, who is anticipating an incognito food critic, restores his tyrannical management of Hain and lashes out at the staff when his knife goes missing, prompting Ella to confront him over his fixation over the knife and his dishonesty about his fiancée. Meanwhile, Ella and Wena deal with an influencer couple named Kaela and Winston, who spend three consecutive nights ordering laing-based dishes as part of their anniversary, during which their relationship seemingly deteriorates in acrimony due to their constant quarreling before pulling back on the last night. Kaela later joins Ella and Wena during their smoke break and reassures them that their bickering is part of their love language. At the same time, a female customer catches Ella's attention by ordering exactly what Kaela and Winston had ordered and complimenting Ella. Ella later finds Chico's knife, but throws it into the garbage in revenge for Chico's behavior. As Ella leaves, Raymond kisses her.
7	"Episode 7"	Dan Villegas	Fatrick Tabada and Antoinette Jadaone	November 24, 2023
Chico reluctantly allows a gay wedding to be held in Hain after a request from Ella. Carlon, a closeted gay, grows worried when he learns that the wedding coordinator is his boyfriend Matt. Juancho, Hain's intern chef from New York is ordered fired for his incompetence and arrogance, with Carlon acrimoniously breaking the news to him at the stockroom. However, the stockroom's door breaks down, leaving them both trapped. The two then bond, with Carlon taking back his negative remarks and Juancho confessing that he was uncertain from the beginning about whether cooking was for him. Juancho also reassures Carlon that everyone in Hain knows about his sexuality, prompting him to come out publicly with Matt during the wedding after they escape the stockroom. As the kitchen celebrates, Hain's long-awaited critic's review comes out, singling out Ella for praise. A jealous Chico, unaware that the critic was the woman who ordered laing from Ella, falsely accuses her of sleeping with what he assumes was a male critic, prompting her to quit.
8	"Episode 8"	Dan Villegas	Fatrick Tabada and Antoinette Jadaone	November 24, 2023
An unemployed Ella finds herself at peace with Raymond, now her boyfriend, while awaiting their departure for Singapore to manage a new restaurant with Ella as head chef. Meanwhile, Hain deteriorates under Chico's leadership, resulting in cancellations. A worried VLG comforts Chico, telling him to take a break and ask others for help in saving Hain. After Rye, Hain's bartender pleads with Chico to save their livelihoods, Chico visits Ella and announces his resignation as head chef, offering his position to Ella while making amends for his treatment of her by presenting her with her own customized knife. On the eve of her departure, Ella volunteers to manage Hain as head chef for the night, but her efforts go awry when an elderly couple, Roberto and Belen, who announce their separation to their family at Hain, complain about their bopis lacking its key ingredient: pig hearts. Raymond, noticing Ella's ease in managing Hain, tells her if she wants to reconsider. After closing time, Ella encounters Belen, who reveals that she had been recommended to go to Hain by her friend Concha and advises her to live her life to the fullest before promising to return for an better bopis. The next day, Ella informs a forlorn Raymond of her decision to stay at Hain and sees him off at the airport. Ella arrives at Hain to permanently become head chef, to the delight of the staff.

== Production ==
The series is directed by Dan Villegas. It was first officially announced on September 18, 2023 during the See What's Next event of Netflix Philippines.
