= Love You to the Stars and Back =

- Theatrical Poster
- Directed by: Antoinette Jadaone
- Written by: Antoinette Jadaone
- Produced by: Charo Santos-Concio; Malou Santos
- Starring: Julia Barretto; Joshua Garcia
- Cinematography: Hermann Claravall
- Edited by: Marya Ignacio
- Music by: Francis Concio
- Production company: ABS-CBN Film Productions, Inc.
- Distributed by: Star Cinema
- Release date: August 30, 2017
- Running time: 111 minutes
- Country: Philippines
- Language: Filipino
- Box office: ₱112 million

Love You to the Stars and Back is a 2017 Filipino romantic comedy film written and directed by Antoinette Jadaone. Starring Julia Barretto and Joshua Garcia, the film marks their second project together following the 2016 Metro Manila Film Festival entry Vince and Kath and James.

The story conference for the film was held in April 2017 with no working title yet. Production pushed through in May and it was released on August 30, 2017, to box office success.

== Plot ==
Mika is a troubled teenager reeling from her mother’s death and her father marrying another woman, Sheryl. One day, she drives out to Mount Milagros in Batangas, a favorite hiking spot of her and her mother, in the hope of being taken by aliens. While relieving herself on the way, she stumbles upon Caloy, who is biking his way to Calaca to see his estranged father. Mika mistakes Caloy for a maniac and drives off, but accidentally runs over his foot. Out of guilt, Mika takes him in on his way to Calaca.

Mika and Caloy explain to each other the purpose of their travels, with Caloy adding that he is in remission from leukemia. Caloy dismisses Mika’s alien abduction story, leading to them bickering about whether carabaos are carnivorous. To resolve their argument, they ask Berting, a farmer carrying a load of chickens to his mother-in-law, but Berting scolds them for their bickering and continues on. Out of pity, Mika offers Berting a ride, but along the way, several of the chickens escape, delaying their trip. When they arrive late, Mika defends Berting in front of his mother-in-law, earning respect from the two. Later, one of Berting’s chickens is found hiding in Mika's car. Mika and Caloy name her Goldie, and end up pretending to be a married couple in front of her throughout the trip.

Mika and Caloy have lunch with Aling Berns and her daughter Ronnabel before Mika drops Caloy off near his father’s place. Caloy's father refuses to see him, prompting Caloy to storm off in frustration. Mika encounters a despondent Caloy near a bridge and stops him from jumping off after he reveals that his cancer had returned. Caloy agrees to go with Mika to Mount Milagros to be taken by aliens. Along the way, they run again into Ronnabel, who had fled her high school prom out of anxiety over her crush. Mika and Caloy convince her to face her fears and join her at the prom.

Mika and Caloy get lost while looking for the summit of Mount Milagros and book a hotel for the night as Mika reconciles with her family over the phone. The next day, Mika stumbles upon a weakened Caloy bleeding and lying on the floor from his cancer. As Mika calls his family for help, Caloy berates her, saying that he does not want to burden them with the costs for his treatment. Mika persists and delivers him to a hospital, followed by his family. During treatment, Caloy has a vision of him and Mika being abducted by aliens at the top of Mount Milagros. When he wakes up, he is surrounded by his family. He searches for Mika, but his mother Linda reveals that Mika left after raising funds for his treatment, along with Goldie and a letter, in which she writes that he gave her something to live for in this world and hopes that he would also find the same.

Sometime later, Caloy fully recovers and hikes to Mount Milagros. At the summit, he is reunited with Mika.

== Cast ==
=== Main cast ===
- Julia Barretto as Mika, An eccentric woman determined to find aliens, believing her place is with them.
- Joshua Garcia as Caloy, A broken child after he was disowned by his father several times. He suffers leukemia thus making him feel like he is a burden to everyone.

=== Supporting cast ===
- Carmina Villarroel as Michelle, Mika’s mother
- Cherry Pie Picache as Linda, Caloy’s mother
- Ariel Rivera as Ricky, Mika’s father
- Maricar Reyes as Sheryl, Mika’s stepmother
- Edgar Allan Guzman as JP, Caloy’s Elder Brother
- Eda Nolan as Jane, Caloy’s Elder Sister
- Monica Prado as Caloy’s Stepmother
- Belle Mariano as Ronnabel, Aling Berns’ child. Does not want to go the J.S prom, but was convinced by Mika and Caloy.
- Joaq Reyes as Vincent, Caloy’s younger brother
- Paulo Angeles as Kenneth, Ronnabel’s Crush
- Jelson Bay as Mang Berting, Was accompanied by Mika and Caloy. Until he reached his destination.
- Odette Khan as Doña Leticia, Mang Berting’s future in law
- Ruby Ruiz as Aling Berns, Ronnabel’s mother
- Dr. Philip Niño Tan-Gatue as Doctor

== Release ==
Love You to the Stars and Back was released on August 30, 2017. The film was graded "B" by the Cinema Evaluation Board of the Philippines. It grossed ₱60 million on its first week in the cinemas. As of September 16, 2017, the film grossed ₱112 million.

=== Critical response ===
The film received generally positive feedback and glowing reviews from critics. Oggs Cruz of Rappler lauded the film's use of realistic scenes of extended conversations as opposed to very brisk romantic instances. He also praised Garcia's and Barretto's acting, calling them "astute and delightful", respectively. Philbert Dy gave the film 5 out of 5 "tickets", noting that within the first five minutes of the film, you'll know it's not the usual Star Cinema fare, further highlighting the touch of indie filmmaking. He also praised the film's slow build of melodrama and the acting abilities and the chemistry of the lead actors.
