= Kaila Estrada =

Filipino actress (born 1996)

- Born: Michaela Aryanna de Belen Estrada; March 16, 1996 (age 30)
- Education: De La Salle–College of Saint Benilde (AB)
- Occupations: Actress; model
- Years active: 2013–present
- Known for: Viral Scandal; Linlang; Can't Buy Me Love; What Lies Beneath
- Parent(s): Janice de Belen (mother); John Estrada (father)
- Relatives: Gelli de Belen (aunt); Ariel Rivera (uncle-in-law)

Michaela Aryanna "Kaila" de Belen Estrada (born March 16, 1996) is a Filipino actress. Following several stints in modeling, she signed with Star Magic in 2021 and made her first screen appearance in the drama mystery series Viral Scandal (2021). Her profile increased in 2023 following her roles in the television series Linlang and Can't Buy Me Love. She has won a Star Award for Movies, including nominations for an Asian Academy Creative Award and a PMPC Star Awards for Television.

== Early life and background ==
Michaela Aryanna de Belen Estrada was born on March 16, 1996. She is the youngest daughter and third of four children of actors John Estrada and Janice de Belen. Estrada graduated with a Bachelor of Arts degree in Arts Management from the De La Salle–College of Saint Benilde in 2017.

== Acting career ==
=== Modeling (2013–2020) ===
At age 17, Estrada began modeling in 2013 as a ramp model for fashion designer Randy Ortiz. The following year, she signed with Mercator Models and Talent Management. In 2018, she took part in #SMYouthDenim fashion show at SM Makati as an ambassadress for SM Youth.

=== Acting debut and breakthrough (2021–present) ===
Following her contract signing with Star Magic in 2021, Estrada ventured into acting and made her first screen appearance in the mystery drama Viral Scandal as Raven Ramones. In an exclusive interview with Metro Style, she revealed that she auditioned for the role twice as the production felt she was a bit stiff the first time she auditioned. Her performance was met with praises from the viewers and critics alike, noting her "crisp delivery of lines". The following year, she appeared in the hybrid narrative-reality show The Chosen One aired on PIE Channel. In March 2022, she starred in an episode of drama anthology Maalaala Mo Kaya as Karen Bordador, a former radio DJ and Pinoy Big Brother Kumunity Season 10 Celebrity Edition alumna. The episode was named the National Winner for "Best Single Drama or Telemovie/Anthology" at the Asian Academy Creative Awards. Later in 2022, she starred in a three-part special episode of Maalaala Mo Kaya as Abby. The following year, Estrada starred alongside Joao Constancia and Chie Filomeno in the second season of Love Bites streaming on ABS-CBN Entertainment's official YouTube channel. In July 2023, she played a supporting role in the comedy-drama Fit Check: Confessions of an Ukay Queen on Amazon Prime Video. Upon release, the series was one of the most-watched TV shows on the platform throughout its run.

Her portrayal of Sylvia Lualhati in Linlang received widespread acclaim and earned a nomination at the ContentAsia Awards 2024 for Best Supporting Actress in a TV Programme/Series. Viewers were also surprised for the plot twist involving her character Bettina Tiu in the romantic drama series Can't Buy Me Love.

In 2025, Estrada starred as cyber hacker and agent Max Alvaro in the action series Incognito. From 2025 to 2026, she played Erica Melendez on the mystery thriller series What Lies Beneath.

== Acting credits ==
=== Film ===
Key
†	Denotes films that have not yet been released

Year	Title	Role	Ref.
2024	Fruitcake	Tazha	
2024	That Kind of Love	Sofia	
2024	Un/Happy for You	Aiah	
2025	Meet, Greet & Bye	Angie	
2025	Shake, Rattle & Roll: Evil Origins	DJ Nyxx	

=== Television ===
Key
†	Denotes shows that have not yet been released

Year	Title	Role	Notes	Ref.
2020	Mars Pa More	Herself	First TV appearance with Inah de Belen	
2021	Viral Scandal	Raven Ramones	First TV appearance	
2022	The Chosen One	Charlie Factora		
2022	Maalaala Mo Kaya	Karen Bordador	Episodes: "Selda", "Tablet"	
2022	Maalaala Mo Kaya	Abby	Episodes: "Family Picture", "Bote", "Passport"	
2022	Love in 40 Days	Young Ofelia/Josie		
2023	Love Bites	Evelyn		
2023	Fit Check: Confessions of an Ukay Queen	Naomi Sevilla		
2023	Linlang	Sylvia Villamayor-Lualhati		
2023	Can't Buy Me Love	Bettina Tiu		
2024	Bida/Bida	Herself		
2025	Incognito	Macaria "Max" Alvero / Metamorphosis / Eagle		
2025–2026	What Lies Beneath	Erica Melendez		

== Awards and nominations ==
Awards and nominations received by Kaila Estrada
Award (Note: Awards, festivals, honors and other miscellaneous organizations are listed in alphabetical order.)	Year (Note: Indicates the year of ceremony. Each year is linked to the article about the awards held that year, wherever possible.)	Category	Nominated work	Result	Ref.
Asian Academy Creative Awards	2024	Best Actress in a Supporting Role	Linlang	Nominated	
ContentAsia Awards	2024	Best Supporting Actress in a TV Programme / Series	Linlang	Nominated	
Star Awards for Movies	2025	New Movie Actress of the Year	Un/Happy for You	Won	
Star Awards for Television	2025	Best Drama Supporting Actress	Linlang	Nominated	
VP Choice Awards	2023	Breakthrough Social Media Star	Kaila Estrada	Won	
VP Choice Awards	2024	TV Supporting Actress of the Year	Can't Buy Me Love	Nominated	
VP Choice Awards	2024	Breakthrough Star of the Year	Linlang	Nominated	
