= 2017 Box Office Entertainment Awards =

Annual Philippine entertainment awards

- Date: May 14, 2017
- Location: Henry Lee Irwin Theater, Ateneo de Manila University, Quezon City
- Hosted by: Enchong Dee; Kim Chiu; Christian Bautista; Iza Calzado

Television/radio coverage
- Network: ABS-CBN

The 48th Guillermo Mendoza Memorial Scholarship Foundation Box Office Entertainment Awards (GMMSF-BOEA), honored the personalities, movies and TV programs in the Philippines, held on May 14, 2017 at the Henry Lee Irwin Theater in Ateneo de Manila University, Quezon City. Vice Ganda, Coco Martin, Daniel Padilla and Kathryn Bernardo lead winners at the annual awards. The awards night was aired on ABS-CBN's Sunday's Best on May 21, 2017.

== Winners selection ==
The GMMSF honors Filipino actors, actresses and other performers' commercial success, regardless of artistic merit, in the Philippine entertainment industry. The award giving body selects the high-ranking Philippine films of 2016 based on total average rankings at box office published results as basis for awarding the three major categories in the awarding ceremonies, The Phenomenal Box Office Star, The Box Office King and The Box Office Queen.

== Awards ==
- Phenomenal Box Office Star
  - Vice Ganda and Coco Martin (The Super Parental Guardians)
- Box Office King
  - Daniel Padilla (Barcelona: A Love Untold)
- Box Office Queen
  - Kathryn Bernardo (Barcelona: A Love Untold)
- Film Actor of the Year
  - Dingdong Dantes (The Unmarried Wife)
- Film Actress of the Year
  - Vilma Santos (Everything About Her)
- TV Actor of the Year
  - Jericho Rosales (Magpahanggang Wakas)
- TV Actress of the Year
  - Kim Chiu (The Story of Us)
- Prince of Philippine Movies
  - Alden Richards (Imagine You and Me)
- Princess of Philippine Movies
  - Maine Mendoza (Imagine You and Me)
- Prince of Philippine Television
  - James Reid (Till I Met You)
- Princess of Philippine Television
  - Nadine Lustre (Till I Met You)
- Comedy Actor of the Year
  - Vic Sotto
- Comedy Actress of the Year
  - Angelica Panganiban
- TV Supporting Actor of the Year
  - Arjo Atayde (FPJ's Ang Probinsyano)
- TV Supporting Actress of the Year
  - Susan Roces (FPJ's Ang Probinsyano)
- Most Popular Love Team of the Year
  - Enrique Gil and Liza Soberano
- Most Promising Love Team of the Year
  - McCoy de Leon and Elisse Joson
- Most Promising Movie Actor of the Year
  - Joshua Garcia (Vince & Kath & James)
- Most Promising Movie Actress of the Year
  - Julia Barretto (Vince & Kath & James)
- Most Promising TV Actor of the Year
  - Joseph Marco (Pasión de Amor)
- Most Promising TV Actress of the Year
  - Yassi Pressman (FPJ's Ang Probinsyano)
- Breakthrough Performance by an Actor in a Single Program
  - Coco Martin (FPJ's Ang Probinsyano)
- Male Concert Performers of the Year
  - Martin Nievera and Erik Santos (Royals)
- Female Concert Performers of the Year
  - Regine Velasquez and Angeline Quinto (Royals)
- Male Recording Artist of the Year
  - Alden Richards (Say It Again)
- Female Recording Artist of the Year
  - Sarah Geronimo (The Great Unknown)
- Most Promising Male Singer/Performer of the Year
  - Bailey May (Bailey)
- Most Promising Female Singer/Performer of the Year
  - Ylona Garcia (My Name is Ylona Garcia)
- Most Popular Recording/Performing Group
  - #Hashtags (#Hashtags)
- Most Promising Recording/Performing Group
  - That's My Bae
- Breakthrough Child Star of Movies & TV
  - McNeal "Awra" Briguela
- Most Popular Male Child Performer
  - Simon "Onyok" Pineda
- Most Popular Female Child Performer
  - Xia Vigor
- All-Time Favorite Actor
  - Ian Veneracion
- All-Time Favorite Actress
  - Jodi Sta. Maria
- Most Popular Film Producer
  - Star Cinema
- Most Popular Film Director
  - Joyce Bernal (The Super Parental Guardians)
- Most Popular Screenwriter
  - Olivia Lamasan and Carmi Raymundo (Barcelona: A Love Untold)
- Most Popular TV Program (News & Public Affairs)
  - 24 Oras
- Most Popular TV Program Primetime Drama
  - FPJ's Ang Probinsyano
- Most Popular TV Program Daytime Drama
  - The Greatest Love
- Most Popular TV Program-Talent (Search/Reality/Talk/Game)
  - The Voice Kids Season 3
- Most Popular TV Program (Musical Variety/Noontime and Primetime)
  - ASAP
- Male TV Host of the Year
  - Luis Manzano
- Female TV Host of the Year
  - Toni Gonzaga-Soriano

== Special awards ==
- Bert Marcelo Lifetime Achievement Award
  - Ogie Alcasid
- Global Achievement by a Filipino Artist
  - Lav Diaz (Ang Babaeng Humayo and Hele sa Hiwagang Hapis), Venice Golden Lion winner, Berlin Silver Bear Alfred Bauer Prize winner, Asian Film Awards Best Director and Best Screenplay nominee
  - Charo Santos-Concio (Ang Babaeng Humayo), Asian Film Awards Best Actress nominee
  - Jaclyn Jose (Ma' Rosa), Cannes Best Actress winner
  - Hasmine Killip (Pamilya Ordinaryo), Asia Pacific Screen Awards Best Performance by an Actress winner
  - Paolo Ballesteros (Die Beautiful), Tokyo Best Actor winner
  - Iza Calzado (Bliss), Osaka Yakushi Pearl Award for Best Performer winner
  - Ai-Ai delas Alas (Area), Queens New York Best Female Actor winner
  - Lotlot de Leon (1st Sem), All Lights India Sole Acting Citation for Exceptional Performance winner
