= Love Is Never Gone =

Philippine romantic drama television series

- Promotional Ivana Alawi poster
- Genre: Romantic drama Action; Thriller
- Directed by: Emmanuel Palo; Jojo Saguin
- Starring: Joshua Garcia; Ivana Alawi
- Country of origin: Philippines
- Original languages: Filipino; English
- No. of episodes: 14

Production
- Executive producers: Carlo L. Katigbak; Cory V. Vidanes; Laurenti M. Dyogi
- Producer: Ronald Dantes Atianzar
- Production location: Morocco
- Camera setup: Single-camera
- Running time: 58–60 minutes
- Production companies: ABS-CBN Studios; Dreamscape Entertainment

Original release
- Network: Amazon Prime Video
- Release: May 8 (Note: It was released in the United States on May 7, 2026.) – June 19, 2026

Love Is Never Gone is a Philippine romantic drama television series produced by ABS-CBN Studios and Dreamscape Entertainment. Directed by Emmanuel Palo and Jojo Saguin, it stars Joshua Garcia and Ivana Alawi. The series premiered on Amazon Prime Video on May 8, 2026 to June 19, 2026.

This is the first-ever Filipino teleserye to shoot in Morocco.

== Synopsis ==
Teo is a devoted son who dreams of a better life for his family. He falls victim to Yana, a cunning thief known as “Chameleon,” but soon learns she steals out of desperation to care for her sick mother. What begins in anger turns into love, forged through shared loss and sacrifice. However, Yana’s ties to a crime syndicate lead to betrayal and Teo’s wrongful imprisonment, leaving him convinced she destroyed him. Years later, pardoned and back in the Philippines, Teo tries to rebuild his life, only to discover that Ace Verona’s wife, Gem, is the very image of Yana. As he infiltrates her world seeking justice, he uncovers dangerous secrets about the powerful Verona family and the shocking truth about Gem’s sacrifice to free him. Caught between love, betrayal, and the corruption of a ruthless clan, Teo is forced into a final reckoning where passion, vengeance, and survival collide.

== Cast ==
=== Main cast ===
- Joshua Garcia as Mateo "Teo" Crisanto
  - Justin Mclaire as young Teo
- Ivana Alawi as Yana Kassir / Gem Verona

=== Supporting cast ===
- Jameson Blake as Ace Verona
- Jane Oineza as Larajean Loyola
- Dina Bonnevie as Katarina Verona
- Michael de Mesa as Divino Verona
- Epy Quizon as Alonzo Crisanto
- Fyang Smith as Raya Verona
- JM Ibarra as Ronnie Manalang
- JC Alcantara as Guillermo "Gimo"
- Rans Rifol as Diane
- Kiko Matos as Leon
- Argel Saycon as Jepoy
- Alex Medina as Eric
- Benj Manalo as Steven
- Carlo San Juan
- Ara Mina as Rita Crisanto
- Heart Ramos as Issay Crisanto

=== Guest cast ===
- Irma Adlawan as Nadia
- Tarek El Tayech as Ilyas
- Herald Villanueva as Balut vendor/Media personnel/Mechanic
- Kanata Tapia
- Avery Balasbas

== Episodes ==
No.	Title	Original release date
1	"Change Encounter"	May 8, 2026
2	"Farewell and a New Beginning"	May 8, 2026
3	"The Stage Set for Deception"	May 15, 2026
4	"Searching for Truth"	May 15, 2026
5	"Silent Sacrifice"	May 22, 2026
6	"Desperate Escape"	May 22, 2026
7	"Kidnapped"	May 29, 2026
8	"Affair"	May 29, 2026
9	"Captive"	June 5, 2026
10	"Reckoning"	June 5, 2026
11	"Unmasked"	June 12, 2026
12	"Crossfire"	June 12, 2026
13	"Downfall"	June 19, 2026
14	"Resurrection"	June 19, 2026

== Production ==
=== Development and casting ===
Dreamscape Entertainment announced on its social media on November 13, 2025 that the series will release in 2026 with Joshua Garcia and Ivana Alawi in the lead role and their first time being paired together. Additional cast were announced on April 8, 2026, which were Jameson Blake, Jane Oineza, Michael de Mesa, Epy Quizon, Fyang Smith, JM Ibarra and Dina Bonnevie. Emmanuel Palo and Jojo Saguin will direct the series with Ayi Tamayo as scriptwriter.

=== Filming ===
Principal photography has started on November 14, 2025 in Morocco.

== Release ==
The series is set to release on May 8, 2026 on Amazon Prime Video. The series consists of 14 episodes.
