= What Lies Beneath (TV series) =

Philippine mystery thriller television series

- Genre: Crime thriller; Mystery; Horror; Action; Drama
- Written by: Arah Jell Badayos; Benson Logronio; Chie Floresca; Joan Habana; Akeem Del Rosario
- Directed by: Dado Lumibao; Froy Allan Leonardo
- Starring: Janella Salvador; Sue Ramirez; Kaila Estrada; Charlie Dizon; Jake Cuenca; JM de Guzman
- Music by: Carmina Cuya
- Country of origin: Philippines
- Original languages: Filipino; English
- No. of episodes: 110 (Netflix); 118 (TV)

Production
- Executive producers: Carlo L. Katigbak; Cory V. Vidanes; Laurenti M. Dyogi
- Producers: Katrina Juban; Fe Catherine D.V. Ancheta; Roda Catolico - Dela Cerna
- Production locations: Lingayen; Alaminos, Pangasinan
- Cinematography: Eli G. Balce
- Editor: Joy C. Buenaventura
- Running time: 20–36 minutes
- Production companies: ABS-CBN Studios; RCD Narratives

Original release
- Network: Kapamilya Channel (Note: First released on Netflix and iWant that marketed as "advanced screening". It is currently airing on its primary network Kapamilya Channel as well as other blocktime channels and platforms.)
- Release: October 20, 2025 – April 1, 2026

What Lies Beneath is a Philippine television drama mystery thriller series broadcast by Kapamilya Channel. Directed by Dado C. Lumibao and Froy Allan Leonardo, it stars Janella Salvador, Sue Ramirez, Kaila Estrada, Charlie Dizon, Jake Cuenca and JM de Guzman. It aired on the network's Primetime Bida line up and worldwide on TFC from October 20, 2025 to April 1, 2026.

== Premise ==
Four women — Alice (Janella Salvador), Mel (Sue Ramirez), Erica (Kaila Estrada), and Beth's (Charlie Dizon) lives are torn apart by one lie and one irreversible act after the death of their bestfriend Louisa (Mutya Orquia). As the truth begins to surface, trust erodes, alliances fracture, and survival becomes a battle against both danger and guilt.

== Cast and characters ==
=== Main cast ===
- Janella Salvador as Alicia Marie "Alice" Quintana-Miller
  - Eliza Borromeo as teen Alice
    - Janell Gonzaga as young Alice
- Sue Ramirez as Amelia Grace "Mel" Barrera-Montenegro
  - Reich Alim as teen Mel
- Kaila Estrada as Atty. Erica L. Melendez
  - Krystal Mejes as teen Erica
- Charlie Dizon as Elizabeth "Beth" Sevilla-Mora
  - Allyson McBride as teen Beth
- Jake Cuenca as Edmundo "Edong" Santiago
  - Renshi de Guzman as young Edong
- JM de Guzman as Lucas Santiago
  - Andrez del Rosario as young Lucas

=== Supporting cast ===
- Jameson Blake as Anton Montenegro
- Yves Flores as Ryan Mora
  - Miguel Vergara as young Ryan
- Race Matias as Marco Torres
- Marlo Mortel as Angelo Martinez
  - Luis Vera Perez as young Angelo
- Mary Joy Apostol as Liezel Basa-Martinez
  - Kolette Madelo as young Liezel
- Joel Molina as Edward Q. Mayo
- Sharmaine Suarez as Annette Melendez-Encio
- Mark Neumann as Scott Miller
- Andi Abaya as Althea M. Encio
- Jewel Milag as Chloe S. Mora
- Lawrence Dela Cruz as Joshua B. Martinez
- Carlene Aguilar-Ocampo as Susan Quintana
- Maritess Joaquin as Barbara Montenegro
- Dingdong Bahan as Tim Brocka
- Patrick Ramirez as Tomas "Tom" Justo
- Rhys Stevens as Seth Q. Miller

=== Guest cast ===
- Mutya Orquia as Louisa Mae Soria
- Jennica Garcia as Dolores Santiago
- Gerald Madrid as Crisanto Santiago
- Jenny Miller as Marie Sevilla
- Geoff Eigenmann as Michael "Mike" Quintana
- Bart Guingona as SPO2 Rodrigo A. Celestino
- Richard Reynoso as Danilo
- Ivan Carapiet as Kyle Sebastian
  - Kobie Brown as young Kyle
- Hero Angeles as Lemuel Soria
  - JC Alcantara as young Lemuel
- Batit Espiritu as Lester Soria
- Paolo Serrano as Warden William Ayoc
- Chris Tan as Lawrence Kyo
- Christian Ty as Steve Kyo
  - Ice Almeria as young Steve
- Malou Crisologo as Esther Castro
- Benedix Ramos as Argie Castro
- Franco Laurel as Dr. Cedric Barrera
- Karen Timbol as Margie Barrera
- Adriana Agcaoili as Mrs. Mora
- Kate Yalung as Michelle
  - Hannah Vito as young Michelle
- Malou de Guzman as Dolores (Note: Not to be confused with Edong & Lucas' late mother, and Crisanto's wife Dolores. Both characters share the same first name, but are different people.)
- Rubi Rubi as Vangie Corrales
- Mark Manicad as Marie's live-in partner
- Shanaia Gomez as a vlogger
- Andrew Gan as Travis
- Emma Viri as Christina Mayo
- Raymond Mabute as Locsin
- Bernard Loriaga as Garden/House Owner
- Dwin Araza as Case File: Pilipinas Documentarist Leo Dias

== Episodes ==
The first letter of each episode spells out from 41-45, 45-50, 50-55, 55-60, and 61-65 wording: "MABEL", "Blame", "Guilt", "Scars", and "Truth". 66-82 phrased: "Who Murdered Louisa". 83-100 is phrased "The Killer is Silence". 101-110 is phrased "Never Again". 111-118 is phrased "Speak Now".

No.	Title (Note: The remaining 8 episodes will have episode titles that airs on TV.)	Original air date
1	"What We Buried"	October 20, 2025
Years after witnessing their best friend Louisa's murder, three women reunite to pursue a shared dream – building the perfect home together.
2	"What We're Hiding"	October 21, 2025
Mel faces a scandal that could ruin her career. A guilt-ridden Erica spirals over a menacing call from Edong, the man imprisoned for Louisa's murder.
3	"What Comes Back"	October 22, 2025
Beth voices doubts about Mel's story to her husband, Ryan. Meanwhile, Erica recalls a clue from Louisa's case that may have proved Edong's innocence.
4	"What We Awaken"	October 23, 2025
Erica visits Louisa's alleged killer to ease her guilt. Mel, Alice and Beth question whether Edong's brother, Lucas, still hates them.
5	"What We Reveal"	October 24, 2025
Lucas confronts Erica at her law firm about visiting Edong. Mel faces her mother-in-law's ire during a staged photo-op dinner with her husband.
6	"What We Keep Inside"	October 27, 2025
Mel and Anton struggle to keep up the charade of a loving relationship. Beth questions Alice after seeing her shopping for a gun.
7	"What We Cover Up"	October 28, 2025
Erica receives a concerning tip involving the detective who worked on Louisa's case. Beth endures an uncomfortable dinner with her mother.
8	"What We Uncover"	October 29, 2025
Erica tries to warn her estranged friends that anyone linked to Louisa's case may be in danger. Meanwhile, Beth's daughter gets in trouble at school.
9	"What We Used to Be"	October 30, 2025
Unexpectedly reunited with the other "Mabels," Erica recalls Alice's tragic car accident – and how their friendship grew from a painful start.
10	"What Made Me Who I Am"	October 31, 2025
Given a delivery task by a shady guard, Edong briefly leaves prison, using the chance to visit the ocean and reflect on his troubled upbringing.
11	"Lies We Chose"	November 3, 2025
Edong stalks Beth's daughter in hopes of finding the Mabels' house. Meanwhile, Mel tries to make amends with Lucas – despite Erica's warning.
12	"Lies That Hunt"	November 4, 2025
Alice gets an unexpected and terrifying visitor in the middle of the night, while Beth receives troubling news about her daughter.
13	"Lies Behind Closed Doors"	November 5, 2025
After a fight with Anton, Mel hides in the bathroom to avoid his rage. Beth and Ryan return home with Chloe – but they're not alone.
14	"Lies That Bind"	November 6, 2025
When a powerful gang torches his gym, Lucas faces pressure to comply with their demands. Alice blames her husband for an unsettling break-in.
15	"Lies Unraveled"	November 7, 2025
16	"Lies We Wear"	November 10, 2025
17	"Lies in the Dark"	November 11, 2025
18	"Lies Unmasked"	November 12, 2025
19	"Lies Unleashed"	November 13, 2025
20	"Lies of Retribution"	November 14, 2025
21	"Beneath the Monster"	November 14, 2025
22	"Beneath the Faith"	November 18, 2025
23	"Beneath the Dare"	November 19, 2025
24	"Beneath the Silence"	November 20, 2025
25	"Beneath the Masks"	November 21, 2025
26	"Beneath the Need to Escape"	November 24, 2025
27	"Beneath the Dread"	November 25, 2025
28	"Beneath the Fire"	November 26, 2025
29	"Beneath the Veiled Truth"	November 27, 2025
30	"Beneath the Madness"	November 28, 2025
31	"The Hand That Takes"	December 1, 2025
32	"The Cost of Silence"	December 2, 2025
33	"The Rising Threat"	December 3, 2025
34	"The Secret Note"	December 4, 2025
35	"The Weight of Truth"	December 5, 2025
36	"Beneath the Breaking Point"	December 8, 2025
37	"The Last Call"	December 9, 2025
38	"The Secrets That Linger"	December 10, 2025
39	"The Word That Haunts"	December 11, 2025
40	"The Coffee Shop"	December 12, 2025
41	"Murmurs of the Damned"	December 15, 2025
42	"A Quiet Unraveling"	December 16, 2025
43	"Bound by Wounds"	December 17, 2025
44	"Exposing What Hides"	December 18, 2025
45	"Lurking Truths"	December 19, 2025
46	"Breaking Point"	December 22, 2025
47	"Lethal Secrets"	December 23, 2025
48	"Abyss of Doubt"	December 24, 2025
49	"Mosaic of Lies"	December 25, 2025
50	"Embers and Shadows"	December 26, 2025
51	"Shrouded Danger"	December 29, 2025
52	"Circling Rage"	December 30, 2025
53	"A Fracturing Web"	December 31, 2025
54	"Rising Menace"	January 1, 2026
55	"Secret Feed"	January 2, 2026
56	"Ghosts of Us"	January 5, 2026
57	"Unraveled Hearts"	January 6, 2026
58	"I Watched You Lie"	January 7, 2026
59	"Love and Loss"	January 8, 2026
60	"The Awakening"	January 9, 2026
61	"The Sob That Returned"	January 12, 2026
62	"Reflections in Silence"	January 13, 2026
63	"Unbound"	January 14, 2026
64	"Trapsetter"	January 15, 2026
65	"Healing Amidst the Storm"	January 16, 2026
66	"Wrath Without Mercy"	January 19, 2026
67	"Human Cost"	January 20, 2026
68	"Out of the Shadows"	January 21, 2026
69	"Moves in the Dark"	January 22, 2026
70	"Under Siege"	January 23, 2026
71	"Rules of Ruination"	January 26, 2026
72	"Deeply Damged"	January 27, 2026
73	"Exposed"	January 28, 2026
74	"Reclaiming Her Voice"	January 29, 2026
75	"Entagled"	January 30, 2026
76	"Delirium"	February 2, 2026
77	"Long-Buried Links"	February 3, 2026
78	"Overlooked"	February 4, 2026
79	"United by Courage"	February 5, 2026
80	"Inescapable Intersections"	February 6, 2026
81	"Still Watching"	February 9, 2026
82	"Against the Helpless"	February 10, 2026
83	"Truce and Truth"	February 11, 2026
84	"Half Revealed"	February 12, 2026
85	"Exile Souls"	February 13, 2026
86	"Knowing the Game"	February 16, 2026
87	"Imminent Faultiness"	February 17, 2026
88	"Labyrinth of Fear"	February 18, 2026
89	"Light on the Monsters"	February 19, 2026
90	"Evil Unmasked"	February 20, 2026
91	"Rated: Raw"	February 23, 2026
92	"I, Eyes"	February 24, 2026
93	"Steeled"	February 25, 2026
94	"Six-Feet Secrets"	February 26, 2026
95	"Imposter"	February 27, 2026
96	"Legacy of Lies"	March 2, 2026
97	"Evil Kiss"	March 3, 2026
98	"Naked Pride"	March 4, 2026
99	"Caged by Echoes"	March 5, 2026
100	"Edge of Justice"	March 6, 2026
101	"No Turning Back"	March 9, 2026
102	"Edge of Revelation"	March 10, 2026
103	"Vacant Mercy"	March 11, 2026
104 (Note: The TV Title was "Ending Another Girl")	"Enemy of My Enemy"	March 12, 2026
105 (Note: The TV Title was "Reflection of the Demon")	"Requiem of the Lost"	March 13, 2026
106 (Note: The TV Title was "At Any Cost")	"Alice Meets Alice"	March 16, 2026
107 (Note: The TV Title was "Grave Signs")	"Godless Hunt"	March 17, 2026
108 (Note: The TV Title was "All Along")	"Answer After 14"	March 18, 2026
109 (Note: The TV Title was "Irreversible")	"Injustice in Justice"	March 19, 2026
110 (Note: The TV Title was "Not a Monster")	"Now What?"	March 20, 2026
In a post-credit scene a shadow figure was whistling "Sabay-Sabay Tayo" in the former house of Louisa which has a similar sound as Edong’s. (for the streaming ending)
111	"Same Road, Same Screams"	March 23, 2026
112	"Predator Unmasked"	March 24, 2026
113	"Everything Unfolding"	March 25, 2026
114	"All Roads Lead Here"	March 26, 2026
115	"Killers Choice"	March 27, 2026
116	"Nothing Comes Easy"	March 30, 2026
117	"Of Love and Loss"	March 31, 2026
118	"What Lies Beyond"	April 1, 2026
In a post-credit scene a shadow figure was whistling "Sabay-Sabay Tayo" in the former house of Louisa which has a similar sound as Edong’s. (for the television ending)

== Production ==
ABS-CBN announced the series on their list of upcoming series' for 2025 and the cast included were originally Bela Padilla, Charlie Dizon, Janella Salvador, Julia Barretto, Jake Cuenca, and JM De Guzman. Padilla backed out of the series because of scheduling conflicts while Barretto was removed from the project with no official reason. Kaila Estrada and Sue Ramirez have been cast as replacements of Padilla and Barretto. Casts of the series were also include the housemates from Pinoy Big Brother: Celebrity Collab Edition 2.0, such as Krystal Mejes, Miguel Vergara, Eliza Borromeo, and Reich Alim.

== Release ==
What Lies Beneath was first released on Netflix and iWant the day after for advanced episodes. The series premiered on Kapamilya Channel and other television channels & platforms. It originally consists of 100 episodes before it extended to 110 episodes. However, due to their developments, the series was extended to last eight more episodes for its TV broadcast consisting 118 episodes as it will conclude on April 1, 2026, yet Netflix remained consisting 110 episodes, as it is separated from the cut / version to its TV broadcast for the finale week.

== Re-runs ==
The show will air re-runs on Kapamilya Channel, Kapamilya Online Live, A2Z and All TV under the Kapamilya Gold programming block of ABS-CBN from October 5, 2026 to March 5, 2027, replacing My Bespren Emman.
