= Unbreak My Heart (TV series) =

2023 Philippine television drama series

- Title card
- Genre: Romantic drama
- Written by: Genesis Rodriguez; Abi Lam-Parayno; Wilbert Christian Tan; Camille Anne dela Cruz
- Directed by: Emmanuel Quindo Palo; Dolly Dulu
- Starring: Jodi Sta. Maria; Richard Yap; Joshua Garcia; Gabbi Garcia
- Country of origin: Philippines
- Original language: Tagalog
- No. of seasons: 2
- No. of episodes: 100

Production
- Executive producers: Carlo Katigbak; Cory Vidanes; Laurenti Dyogi; Roldeo Endrinal; Jose Mari Abacan; Annette Gozon-Valdes
- Producers: Eleanor Martinez; Catherine Grace Abarrondo; Ma. Camille Navarro
- Production locations: Switzerland; Italy; Philippines
- Camera setup: Multiple-camera setup
- Production company: Dreamscape Entertainment

Original release
- Network: GMA Network
- Release: May 29 – November 16, 2023

Unbreak My Heart is a 2023 Philippine romantic drama television series broadcast by GMA Network. Directed by Emmanuel Quindo Palo and Dolly Dulu, it stars Jodi Sta. Maria, Richard Yap, Joshua Garcia, and Gabbi Garcia. It premiered on May 29, 2023 in the network's Telebabad line up. The series concluded on November 16, 2023, with a total of two seasons and 100 episodes.

The series is streaming online on Viu.

== Cast and characters ==
Cast

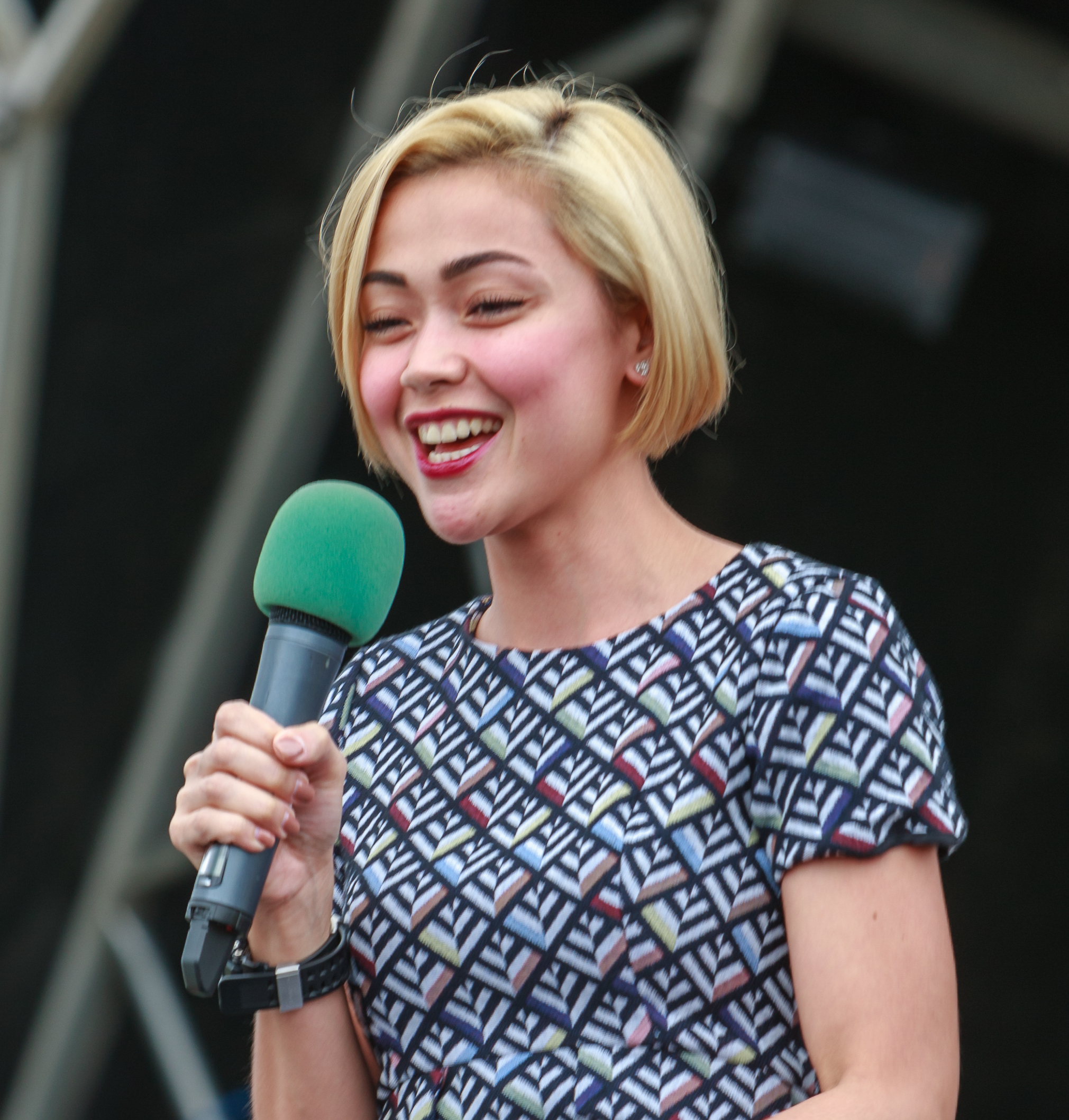
Jodi Sta. Maria

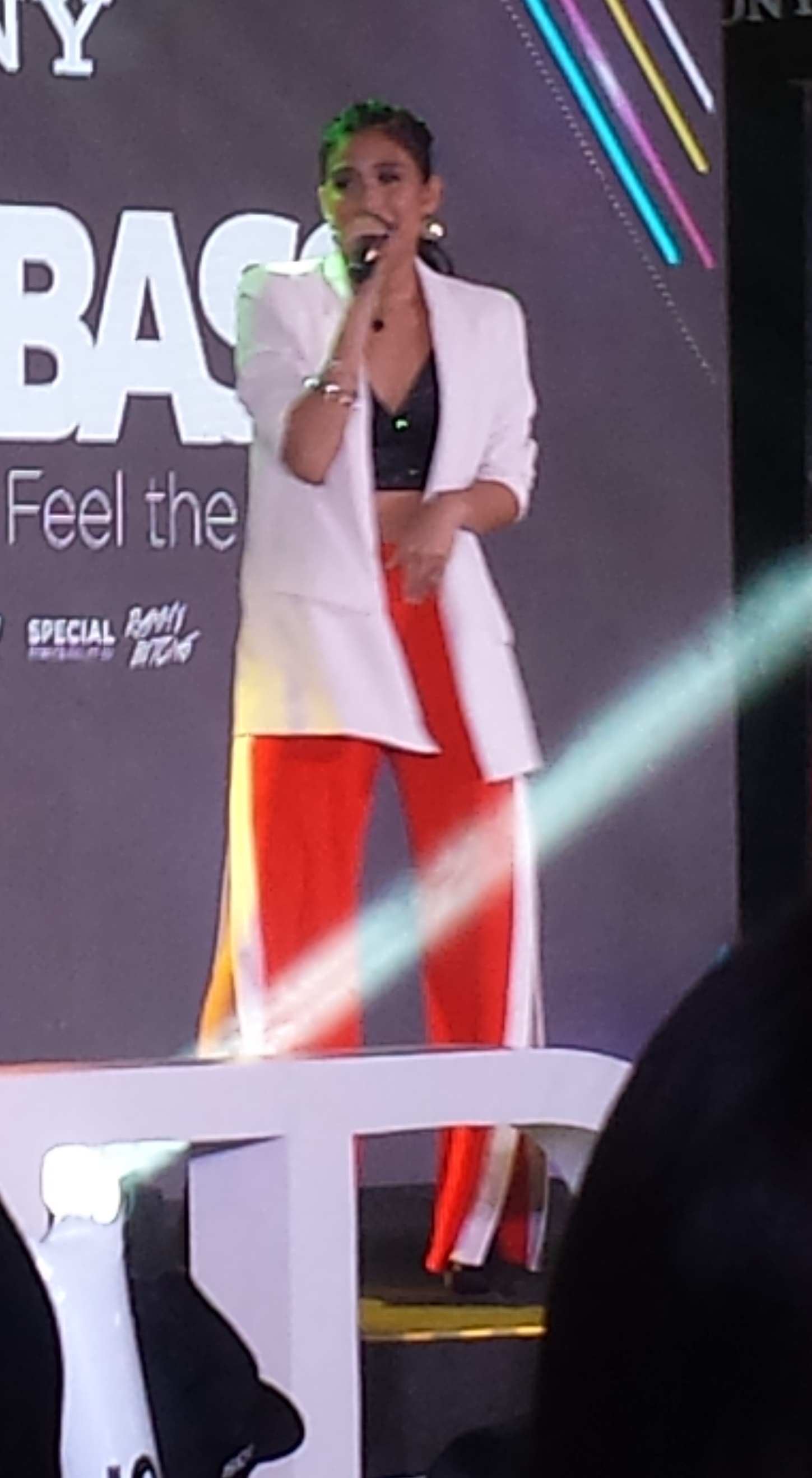
Gabbi Garcia

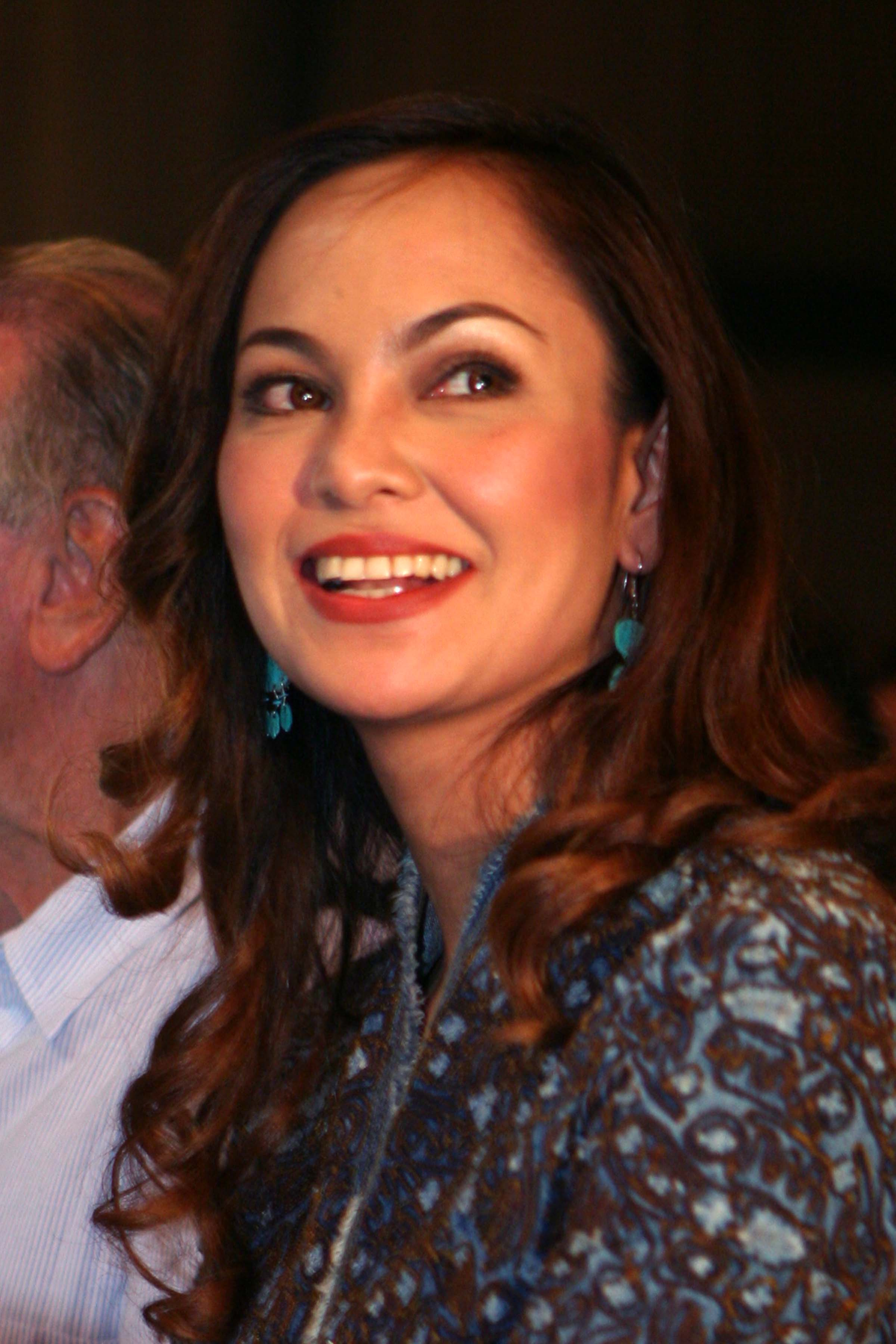
Eula Valdez

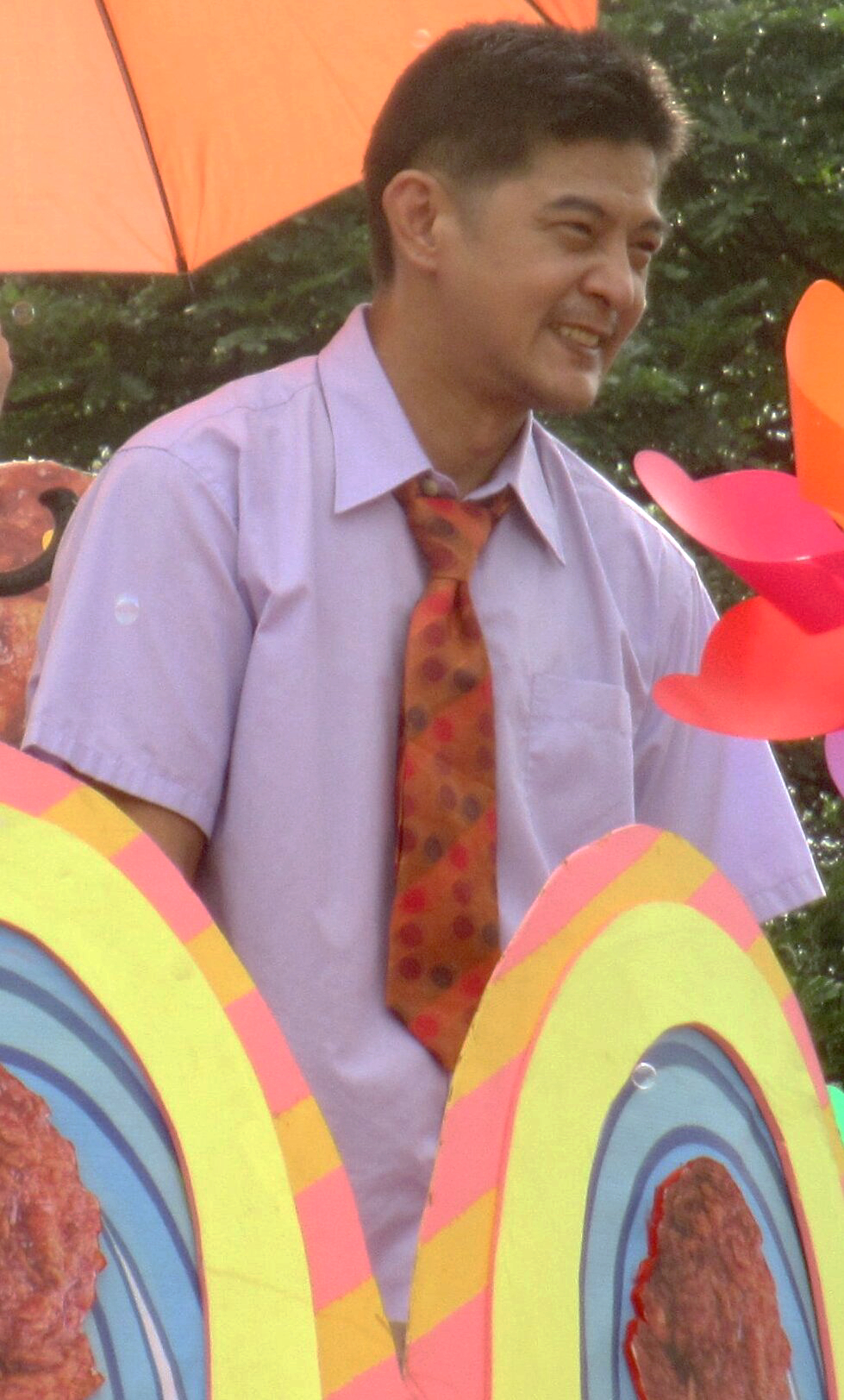
Romnick Sarmenta

Lead cast

- Jodi Sta. Maria as Rosanna Marie "Rose" Jacinto-Zhang
- Richard Yap as Matteo "Matt" T. Zhang
- Gabbi Garcia as Alexandra "Alex / Xandra" J. Zhang
- Joshua Garcia as Lorenzo "Renz" Isidro

Supporting cast

- Laurice Guillen as Lily Tansengco-Zhang
- Eula Valdez as Evangeline "Vangie" Isidro
- Sunshine Cruz as Christina Romualdez
- Romnick Sarmenta as Mario Isidro
- Victor Neri as Dante Manalad
- Nikki Valdez as Luzviminda "Luz" Keller
- Will Ashley as Jeremiah "Jerry" Keller
- Jeremiah Lisbo as Franco Lauchengco
- Bianca de Vera as Gwen R. Zhang
- Maey Bautista as Elsie
- Dionne Monsanto as Queenie
- PJ Endrinal as Barry
- Mark Rivera as Jacob
- Marvin Yap as Arthur Dimalanta

Guest cast

- Art Acuña as Raymond Jacinto
- Zach Castañeda as a nurse
- Iana Bernardez as Jennifer "Jenny" Antonio / Jessica "Jessa" Antonio
- Junjun Quintana as Karlo

== Development ==
In December 2022, executives of GMA Network and ABS-CBN were in discussions for a collaboration of a television series, with both companies casting their respective artists and the latter's production unit Dreamscape Entertainment developing the series.

=== Casting ===
In April 2023, Philippine actor Gardo Versoza was replaced by another actor, Romnick Sarmenta, after Versoza experienced a heart attack on March 28, 2023.

== Production ==
Principal photography commenced in January 2023. In February 2023, the cast and crew filmed in Switzerland and Italy. Filming concluded in July 2023.

== Ratings ==
According to AGB Nielsen Philippines' Nationwide Urban Television Audience Measurement People in television homes, the pilot episode of Unbreak My Heart earned a 6.9% rating.

== Accolades ==
Accolades received by Unbreak My Heart
Year	Award	Category	Recipient	Result	Ref.
2025	37th PMPC Star Awards for Television	Best Drama Actor	Joshua Garcia	Won	
2025	37th PMPC Star Awards for Television	Best Drama Actress	Jodi Sta. Maria	Nominated	
2025	37th PMPC Star Awards for Television	Best Primetime TV Series	Unbreak My Heart	Nominated	
