= Fit Check =

Philippine comedy drama television miniseries

- Genre: Comedy drama
- Written by: Genesis Rodriguez; Abi Lam-Parayno; Wilbert Christian Tan; Camille Anne de la Cruz
- Directed by: Dolly Dulu; Nuel Naval; Raymund Ocampo
- Starring: Kim Chiu; Jake Ejercito
- Country of origin: Philippines
- Original language: Filipino
- No. of episodes: 8

Production
- Executive producers: Carlo Katigbak; Cory Vidanes; Laurenti Dyogi; Roldeo Endrinal
- Producers: Catherine Magdael-Abarrondo; Camille Rosales-Navarro
- Cinematography: Noel Teehankee
- Editors: Arnex Nicolas; Noe Paguiligan
- Production company: Dreamscape Entertainment

Original release
- Network: Amazon Prime Video
- Release: July 6, 2023

Fit Check: Confessions of an Ukay Queen (commonly known as Fit Check) is a Philippine comedy drama miniseries directed by Dolly Dulu, Nuel Naval and Raymund Ocampo and stars Kim Chiu. The series released on July 6, 2023.

== Cast and characters ==
=== Main cast ===
- Kim Chiu as Melanie Dela Cruz
- Jake Ejercito as Chris

=== Supporting cast ===
- Leo Consul as Steve
- Angel Aquino as Georgina
- Christopher De Leon as Michael
- Liza Lorena as Lola Dulce
- Kylie Verzosa as Stella
- KaladKaren as Barbie
- Kaila Estrada as Naomi Sevilla
- Justine Luzares as Mac
- Frenchie Dy as Shelly
- Lie Reposposa as Ayeisha
- Teetin Villanueva as Janica
- Cedrick Juan as Avel
- Sienna Stevens as Chelsea
- Iyannah Sumalpong as young Melanie
- Addy Raj as himself
- Iana Bernardez as young Georgina
- Diana Mackey

== Episodes ==
No.	Title	Original release date
1	"Episode 1"	July 6, 2023
2	"Episode 2"	July 6, 2023
3	"Episode 3"	July 6, 2023
4	"Episode 4"	July 6, 2023
5	"Episode 5"	July 6, 2023
6	"Episode 6"	July 6, 2023
7	"Episode 7"	July 6, 2023
8	"Episode 8"	July 6, 2023

== Marketing ==
The trailer of the series released on June 19, 2023.

== Release ==
The series released on Amazon Prime Video on July 6, 2023 with 8 episodes.
