= Barcelona: A Love Untold =

2016 romantic drama film by Olivia M. Lamasan

- Theatrical release poster
- Directed by: Olivia M. Lamasan
- Written by: Olivia M. Lamasan; Carmi G. Raymundo
- Produced by: Charo Santos-Concio; Malou N. Santos
- Starring: Kathryn Bernardo; Daniel Padilla
- Cinematography: Hermann Claravall
- Edited by: Marya Ignacio; Joshua Ducasen
- Music by: Cesar Francis Concio
- Production company: Star Cinema
- Distributed by: ABS-CBN Film Productions
- Release date: September 14, 2016
- Running time: 130 minutes
- Countries: Philippines; Spain
- Languages: Filipino; English; Spanish
- Box office: ₱321 million

Barcelona: A Love Untold is a 2016 Philippine romantic drama film directed by Olivia M. Lamasan from a story and screenplay she co-wrote with Carmi Raymundo. The film stars Kathryn Bernardo and Daniel Padilla, with the supporting and extended cast include Aiko Melendez, Joey Marquez, Ricky Davao, Maria Isabel Lopez, Joshua Garcia, and Ana Capri.

Produced and distributed by Star Cinema, the film was theatrically released on September 14, 2016.

== Synopsis ==
Ely (Daniel Padilla) cannot get over his past love. In Barcelona, he juggles work with his studies as he aims to get his master's degree. He then meets Mia (Kathryn Bernardo), a girl who sees Spain as a fresh start. After a series of mistakes in the past, she abruptly uproots herself from life in the Philippines to move forward and start anew. But the question is how?

== Cast ==
=== Main cast ===
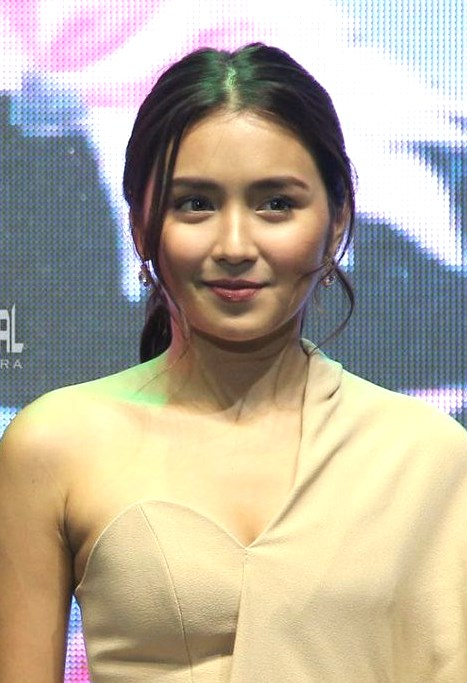
Kathryn Bernardo portrays Mia/Celine

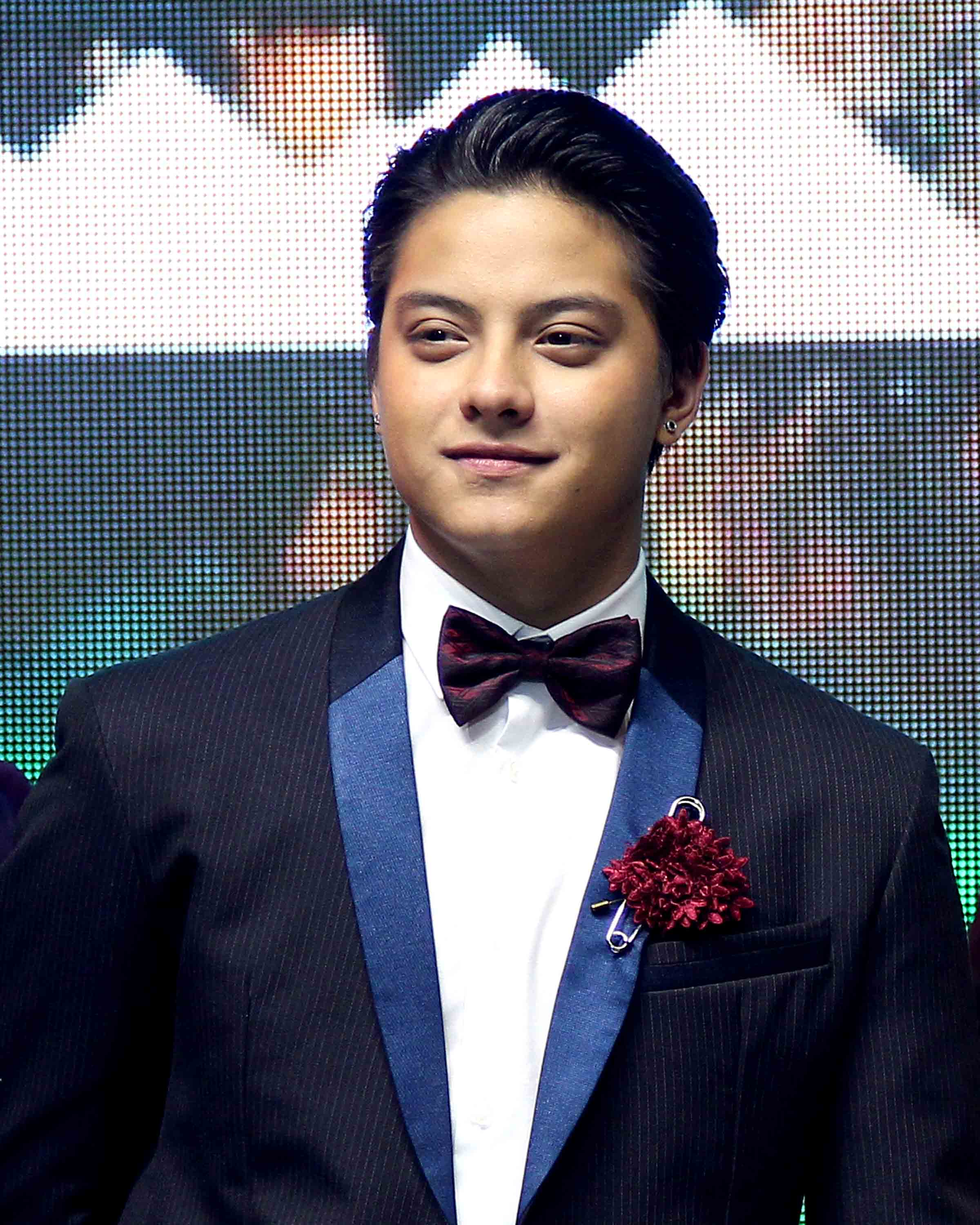
Daniel Padilla portrays Ely

- Kathryn Bernardo as Mia Angela Galvez Dela Torre / Celine Y. Antipala
- Daniel Padilla as John Elias "Ely" Antonio

=== Supporting cast ===
- Aiko Melendez as Insiang, Ely's aunt
- Joey Marquez as Caloy Antonio, Ely's father
- Joshua Garcia as Tonying, Ely's cousin
- Ricky Davao as Robert dela Torre, Mia's father
- Maria Isabel Lopez as Belinda Alfaro, Ely's mother

=== Extended cast ===
- Ana Capri as Jane Antonio, Ely's stepmother
- Cris Villanueva as Benjamin "Ben" Antipala, Celine's father
- Liza Diño-Seguerra as Clara Antipala, Celine's mother
- Ana Abad Santos as Mary Anne dela Torre, Mia's mother
- Melizza Jimenez as Macky dela Torre, Mia's younger sister
- Kathleen Hermosa as Monina dela Torre, Mia's older sister

=== Special participation ===
- CX Navarro as Ely's stepbrother
- John Bermundo as Ely's stepbrother
- Dianne Medina as Flor, OFW recruiter in Spain
- Lei Andrei Navarro as young Ely
- Faye Alhambra as young Celine/Mia
- Patrick Sugui as Lorenz, Ely's friend
- Ignacio Rivera as The Matador
- Marta Soberano as The Flamenco Bride
- Oscar Alfaro as the Spanish Dad
- Emilio Perez as Ely's Spanish half-brother
- Sophia Ysm as Ely's Spanish half-sister
- Vince San Juan as Vince, Ely's co-worker in Barcelona
- Jerome Aguzar as Tourist in Sagrada Familia
- Rianne Salvo Castro as Lorena, Mia's workmate at the Sitges resort
- Matias Cobain as Jose Antonio
- Nuria Casas as Mia's landlady
- Maria Sagan as Maria, the Filipina singer - No longer in contract
- RJ Placino as Arjay, Ely's employer
- Antonio Sousa da Costa as the Waiter, Plaça Real
- Maine Censon as Dorothy
- Min Bernardo as a Barcelona Señora
- Christina Sanchez Elloo as Christina, Ely's classmate
- Nel Closa as Audience
- Vince Charle as Audience

=== Cameo appearances ===
- Cathy Garcia-Molina as Prenup Director

== Soundtrack ==
The theme song of the film, "I'll Never Love This Way Again", was originally sung by Dionne Warwick. There are two versions of the song: one was covered by Gary Valenciano and also by Jona.

== Release ==
The film was released on September 14, 2016, initially in 230 cinemas and was expanded to 250 cinemas for its second day and eventually in 320 cinemas for its succeeding days. The film was screened in the United States and Canada starting September 23, 2016 in 69 cinemas. It earned approximately $434,000 in its first 3 days of showing in North America. After 10 days, it had earned $1,100,000. In its first weekend, the movie made $182,952 in the UAE, with a total gross of $229,849 after 3 weeks of showing. In Australia and New Zealand, it made $41,585 on its first weekend of screening, with a total gross of $59,000 after 2 weeks of screening.

Due to popular demand, it was extended up to four weeks in the US, Canada, UAE, Australia and in Barcelona.

== Reception ==
=== Critical response ===
Oggs Cruz of Rappler gave a mixed review, calling it "a beautiful film" but also "dull and ineffective" and that it "feels too mechanical, too designed to work." Yet he complimented the "overflowing" musical score. Philbert Ortiz Dy of ClickTheCity.com rated the film 2 out of 5 stars, saying "the [film] is just oddly constructed all around. There's just so much to address, and the movie just doesn't seem willing to do the work to give all these issues the time they need." Nazamel Tabares, a movie blogger for Movies Philippines, also rated the film 2 stars out of 5, saying that "there's nothing new in the film and nothing worth keeping after seeing." Je C.C. of Philippine Entertainment Portal said of the film, "Still falling into the pitfalls of Star Cinema cliches, Barcelona: A Love Untold becomes a film of blemished beauty, but that is fine." On the other hand, Rod Magaru, an entertainment blogger, rated the film 9 out of 10 and called it a "masterpiece of 2016." He commended Carmi Raymundo for the way she wrote the flashbacks and added that "it is one of her best." Edmund Silvestre, New York correspondent for Philstar Global Entertainment, wrote, "Barcelona is an enchanting (and hit) tearjerker."

A film review published in Bandera of Philippine Daily Inquirer noted that Barcelona: A Love Untold is not just a kilig movie, giving it 8 out of 10 points. Maureen Marie Belmonte of Push said Barcelona: A Love Untold marks a new era for Kathryn and Daniel because it makes moviegoers appreciate them not just as a bankable love team, but also as bona fide dramatic actors who have successfully gotten past their teenybopper roles.

=== Box office ===
The film earned ₱23 million on its first day of showing surpassing Imagine You and Me for the highest opening-day gross for a Filipino film for the year. The film earned 130 million pesos on its fifth day of showing. On its twelfth day of release, the film earned a total of 200 million pesos. By 4 October, the film had already grossed at least ₱300 million.

The film grossed ₱321 million as of October 8, 2016.

=== Accolades ===
Year	Award-Giving Body	Category	Nominee(s)	Result	Ref.
2017	2017 Box Office Entertainment Awards	Box Office King	Daniel Padilla	Won	
2017	2017 Box Office Entertainment Awards	Box Office Queen	Kathryn Bernardo	Won	
2017	2017 Box Office Entertainment Awards	Most Popular Screenwriter	Olivia Lamasan and Carmi Raymundo	Won	
2017	33rd PMPC Star Awards for Movies	Movie Actor of the Year	Daniel Padilla	Won	
2017	33rd PMPC Star Awards for Movies	Movie Love Team of the Year	KathNiel	Won	
2017	33rd PMPC Star Awards for Movies	Movie of the Year	Barcelona: A Love Untold	Nominated	
2017	33rd PMPC Star Awards for Movies	Movie Director of the Year	Olivia Lamasan	Nominated	
2017	33rd PMPC Star Awards for Movies	Movie Screenwriter of the Year	Carmi Raymundo and Olivia Lamasan	Nominated	
2017	33rd PMPC Star Awards for Movies	Movie Cinematographer of the Year	Hermann Claravall	Nominated	
2017	33rd PMPC Star Awards for Movies	Movie Production Designer of the Year	Shari Marie Montiague	Nominated	
2017	33rd PMPC Star Awards for Movies	Movie Editor of the Year	Marya Ignacio	Nominated	
2017	33rd PMPC Star Awards for Movies	Movie Musical Scorer of the Year	Cesar Francis Concio	Nominated	
2017	33rd PMPC Star Awards for Movies	Movie Sound Engineer of the Year	Aurel Claro Bilbao	Nominated	
2017	33rd PMPC Star Awards for Movies	Movie Actress of the Year	Kathryn Bernardo	Nominated	
2017	57th Asia-Pacific Film Festival	Best Film	Barcelona: A Love Untold	Nominated	
2017	Alta Media Icon Awards 2017	Best Actress	Kathryn Bernardo	Won	
2017	Alta Media Icon Awards 2017	Best Actor	Daniel Padilla	Won	
2017	4th Urduja Film Festival	Movie of the Year (Romance)	Barcelona: A Love Untold	Won	
2017	4th Urduja Film Festival	Best Actor	Daniel Padilla	Nominated	
2017	65th FAMAS Awards	Best Picture	Barcelona: A Love Untold	Won	
2017	65th FAMAS Awards	Best Director	Olivia M. Lamasan	Won	
2017	65th FAMAS Awards	Best Production Design	Shari Marie Montiague	Won	
2017	65th FAMAS Awards	Best Actor	Daniel Padilla	Won	
2017	65th FAMAS Awards	Best Actress	Kathryn Bernardo	Nominated	
2017	65th FAMAS Awards	Best Supporting Actor	Joshua Garcia	Nominated	
2017	65th FAMAS Awards	Best Supporting Actress	Aiko Melendez	Nominated	
2017	65th FAMAS Awards	Best Story	Carmi Raymundo & Olivia M Lamasan	Nominated	
2017	65th FAMAS Awards	Best Screenplay	Carmi Raymundo & Olivia M Lamasan	Nominated	
2017	65th FAMAS Awards	Best Cinematography	Hermann Claravall	Nominated	
2017	65th FAMAS Awards	Best Editing	Marya Ignacio	Nominated	
2017	65th FAMAS Awards	Best Sound	Aurel Claro Bilbao	Nominated	
2017	65th FAMAS Awards	Best Musical Scorer	Cesar Francis Concio	Nominated	

== See also ==
- List of highest-grossing Filipino films of all time
- Top 10 Grossing Philippine Films of 2016
