= Viral Scandal =

Philippine mystery drama television series

- Title card
- Genre: Drama; Mystery
- Created by: Arah Jell Badayos
- Directed by: Dado Lumibao; Froy Allan Leonardo
- Starring: Charlie Dizon; Jake Cuenca; Dimples Romana; Joshua Garcia; Miko Raval
- Music by: Carmina Cuya
- Opening theme: "Nasa'yo Ako" by Gigi De Lana
- Composer: Jonathan Manalo
- Country of origin: Philippines
- Original language: Filipino
- No. of seasons: 2
- No. of episodes: 127 (list of episodes)

Production
- Executive producers: Carlo L. Katigbak; Cory V. Vidanes; Laurenti M. Dyogi; Ruel S. Bayani
- Producers: Katrina Juban; Fe Catherive D.V. Ancheta; Roda Catolico - Dela Cerna
- Running time: 20-45 minutes
- Production company: RCD Narratives

Original release
- Network: Kapamilya Channel (cable and satellite); A2Z (Mega Manila and Eastern Visayas free-to-air television); TV5 (nationwide free-to-air television)
- Release: November 15, 2021 – May 13, 2022

Viral Scandal is a Philippine television drama series broadcast by Kapamilya Channel. Directed by Dado C. Lumibao and Froy Allan Leonardo, it stars Charlie Dizon, Jake Cuenca, Dimples Romana, Miko Raval and Joshua Garcia. It aired on the network's Primetime Bida evening block and worldwide on TFC from November 15, 2021 to May 13, 2022.

== Premise ==
The lives of a simple family become disrupted when a scandalous video involving their eldest daughter goes viral.

== Cast and characters ==
Main cast

- Charlie Dizon as Architect Rica "Ikay" M. Sicat / Rica M. Ramones – A junior architect at Balai Arkitektura. She is Kakay's oldest child, Dan's step-daughter, and Bea & Nico's older half-sister. Her biological father is Mayor Troy Ramones, and this illegitimate parent-child relationship results in her and her mother becoming targets of scrutiny in Sidero. A video of her being raped by Jigs goes viral, and throughout the series she fights with the trauma from that incident.
- Jake Cuenca as Mayor Troy Ramones – The mayor of Sidero who chose to continue a relationship with Kakay despite his family's plans for him to marry Audrey. He is the biological father of Rica and Raven, and Audrey's husband.
- Dimples Romana as Karla "Kakay" Meneses-Sicat – A former OFW in Dubai, Dan's wife, and mother to Rica, Bea, and Nico.
- Joshua Garcia as Architect Kyle Constantino – Founder and CEO of Balai Arkitektura.
- Miko Raval as Danilo "Dan" Sicat – A furniture maker and part-time food delivery driver, Kakay's husband, father to Nico & Bea, and step-father to Rica.

Supporting cast

- Markus Paterson as Councilor Diego "Jigs" S. Ramones – The councilor of Sidero who harbors a history of rape behind his facade of a kind-hearted political figure.
- Jameson Blake as Architect Axel Mateo – A senior architect at Balai Arkitektura, and Kyle's long time best friend.
- Maxene Magalona as Audrey Ramones – Troy's wife and Raven's mother.
- Ria Atayde as Atty. Laura Dizon – A Sidero lawyer who handles Rica's case, and Troy's friend.
- Jong Cuenco as Cong. Alberto Ramones – The congressman of Sidero who is determined to maintain his family's positive reputation; Bobby's biological father, and Troy's adoptive father.
- Gian Magdangal as Bobby Ramones† – Alberto's biological son, Troy's adoptive brother, and Jigs’ father.
- Louise Abuel as Nico M. Sicat – A student at Sidero University, and the youngest child of the Sicat family.
- Karina Bautista as Beatriz "Bea" M. Sicat - A student at Sidero University, and the middle child of the Sicat family.
- Aljon Mendoza as Leopoldo "Pogs" Ygot - A student at Sidero University and Bea’s classmate.
- Kaila Estrada as Raven Ramones - An interior designer and influencer, Troy and Audrey’s daughter, and Rica's half sister.
- Arielle Roces as Rose Tantoco - The secretary of Balai Arkitektura who was the initial victim of Jigs' rape scandal.
- Aya Fernandez as Ella Montecillo - Archie's girlfriend who is another rape victim of Jigs.
- Vance Larena as Archie Soliman - Ella's boyfriend, and a friend of Jigs who knows about his secret.
- Sky Quizon as Brax Delavin - Pogs's friend who admire feelings with Bea.

== Production ==
The project was first announced in February 2021. Filming for the drama began in late May 2021 with a lock-in taping set-up.

Initially known as Viral, it was later changed to Viral Scandal in October 2021.

== Timeslot ==
Viral Scandal replaced Huwag Kang Mangamba on November 15, 2021, in a later timeslot at 9:30 PM. ABS-CBN decided to adjust Marry Me, Marry You's timeslot at 8:45 PM on Kapamilya Channel, Kapamilya Online Live, A2Z, TV5, and Jeepney TV.

The show ended on May 13, 2022, with a total of 127 episodes and was replaced by 2 Good 2 Be True, but the schedule time is 8:45 PM, while The Broken Marriage Vow took over Viral Scandal's timeslot.

== Re-runs ==
The series re-aired on Jeepney TV and All TV from May 19 to October 6, 2024. It also had re-runs on Kapamilya Channel's Kapamilya Gold afternoon block, Kapamilya Online Live, and A2Z's Zuper Hapon from January 6 to July 4, 2025, replacing the re-runs of The Killer Bride and replaced by re-runs of Pamilya Sagrado.

== Spin-off ==
It was announced on March 9, 2022, that a spin-off was being teased during a virtual charity event in collaboration with drama anthology show Maalaala Mo Kaya. Dubbed as Ang Kulit ng Pag-Ibig, it focuses on the "hidden chapter" of Pogs and Bea, portrayed by cast members Aljon Mendoza and Karina Bautista respectively. Directed by Raz de la Torre, it released on March 16, 2022, on the ABS-CBN Entertainment YouTube channel.
