= I Love You, Hater =

2018 Filipino romantic comedy film

- Theatrical movie poster
- Directed by: Giselle Andres
- Screenplay by: Ronalisa A. Co; Kristine Gabriel
- Story by: Carmi Raymundo; Kriz G. Gazmen; Jancy E. Nicolas
- Produced by: Carlo L. Katigbak; Olivia M. Lamasan
- Starring: Joshua Garcia; Julia Barretto; Kris Aquino
- Cinematography: Mo Zee
- Edited by: Noemi Paguiligan; Noah Tonga
- Music by: Jessie Lasaten
- Production company: ABS-CBN Film Productions
- Distributed by: Star Cinema
- Release date: July 11, 2018
- Running time: 120 minutes
- Country: Philippines
- Language: Filipino
- Box office: ₱40 million

I Love You, Hater is a 2018 Philippine romantic comedy film directed by Giselle Andres, starring Joshua Garcia, Julia Barretto and Kris Aquino. It was released on July 11, 2018, by Star Cinema.

== Cast ==
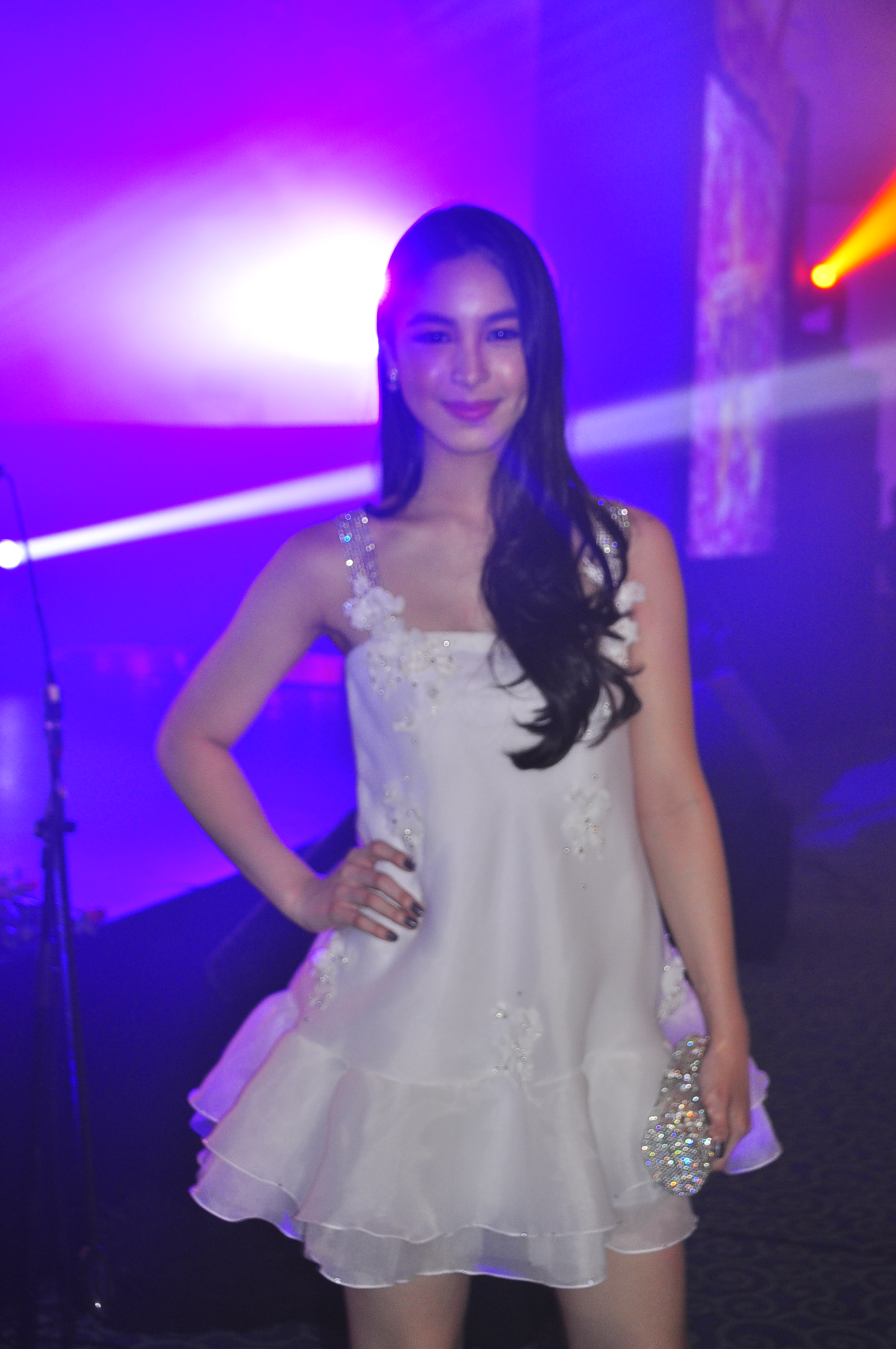
Julia Barretto portrays Zoey Rivera

Joshua Garcia portrays Joko Macaraeg

- Kris Aquino as Sasha Imperial
- Julia Barretto as Zoey Rivera
- Joshua Garcia as Joko Macaraeg
- Ronaldo Valdez as Cesar
- John Estrada as Richard
- Al Tantay as Oxo Macaraeg
- Gio Alvarez as John
- Mark Neumann as Jano
- Markki Stroem as Antoni
- Albie Casiño as Andrew
- Ricardo Cepeda as Chito Bernardo
- Manuel Chua as Rigor Macaraeg
- Alora Sasam as Crystal
- Kat Galang as Daisy
- Maika Rivera as Sophie
- Anna Feo as Zeny
- RB Chanco as Bianca
- Jack Salvador as Rafa

== Theme song ==
- The official theme song of the film is Gusto Ko Lamang sa Buhay by Unit 406 (originally performed by Itchyworms).

== See also ==
- List of Philippine films of 2018
