= Un/Happy for You =

2024 Philippine romantic drama film by Petersen Vargas

- Theatrical release poster
- Directed by: Petersen Vargas
- Screenplay by: Kookai Labayen; Crystal San Miguel; Jen Chuaunsu
- Story by: Kookai Labayen; Crystal San Miguel; Simon Lloyd Arciaga
- Produced by: Kara U. Kintanar; Katherine S. Labayen; Vincent G. Del Rosario III; Veronique Del Rosario-Corpus; Valerie S. Del Rosario
- Starring: Joshua Garcia; Julia Barretto
- Cinematography: Noel Teehankee
- Edited by: Renard Torres
- Music by: Bullet Dumas
- Production companies: ABS-CBN Studios; Star Cinema; Viva Films
- Distributed by: ABS-CBN Film Productions
- Release date: August 14, 2024
- Running time: 110 minutes
- Country: Philippines
- Language: Filipino
- Box office: ₱450 million

Un/Happy for You is a 2024 Philippine romantic drama film directed by Petersen Vargas from a story and screenplay written by Kookai Labayen and Crystal San Miguel, with Simon Lloyd Arciaga and Jen Chuaunsu as the co-writers. It stars Joshua Garcia and Julia Barretto in their comeback film after four years since they last acted together in Block Z. The film is about how ex-lovers navigate feelings of anguish and deep affection with someone who once held a special place in their hearts.

Produced by ABS-CBN Studios, Star Cinema, and Viva Films, the film was theatrically released in Philippine cinemas nationwide on August 14, 2024. The film was a box office success.

== Plot ==
Years ago, Juancho Trinidad (Joshua Garcia), a passionate culinary student, and Zy Angeles (Julia Barretto), an aspiring writer, met during a food festival in Bicol. Their shared love for Bicolano cuisine sparked an immediate connection. Together, they dreamed of opening a restaurant that would celebrate their heritage. However, as their careers took different paths, tensions arose, leading to a painful breakup.

In the present, a successful chef, Juancho, runs "Casa Rosa," a renowned restaurant in Naga City. While preparing for an important investor's dinner, he unexpectedly encounters Zy, who has returned from New York to research Filipino culinary traditions for an article. Still harboring resentment, Juancho invites Zy to his restaurant, aiming to showcase his success and make her regret leaving him. However, he soon learns that Zy is engaged, intensifying his desire to disrupt her life.

As Juancho involves himself in Zy's research, old feelings resurface. Their interactions become a mix of nostalgia, tension, and unresolved emotions. Juancho's initial plan to seduce and sabotage Zy begins to waver as he confronts his lingering affection for her. Zy, too, finds herself questioning her feelings, torn between her current engagement and the rekindled connection with Juancho.

Zy left Juancho, citing his immaturity and lack of direction. Feeling abandoned, Juancho channeled his pain into building his culinary empire. Their confrontations brought these issues to the forefront, forcing both to reflect on their actions and growth.

As their bond deepens, Zy faces a dilemma: Should she pursue a renewed relationship with Juancho or honor her commitment to her fiancé? On the other hand, Juancho must decide whether to prioritize his career aspirations or rekindle a love that once consumed him. Their choices are further complicated by the realization that love alone may not overcome past wounds and present challenges.

Zy ended her engagement, acknowledging that she needs time to rediscover herself. Juancho, having gained closure, focuses on expanding his restaurant and nurturing his team. They part ways amicably, cherishing their shared memories but understanding that their paths have diverged.

== Cast ==
Joshua Garcia portrays Juancho.

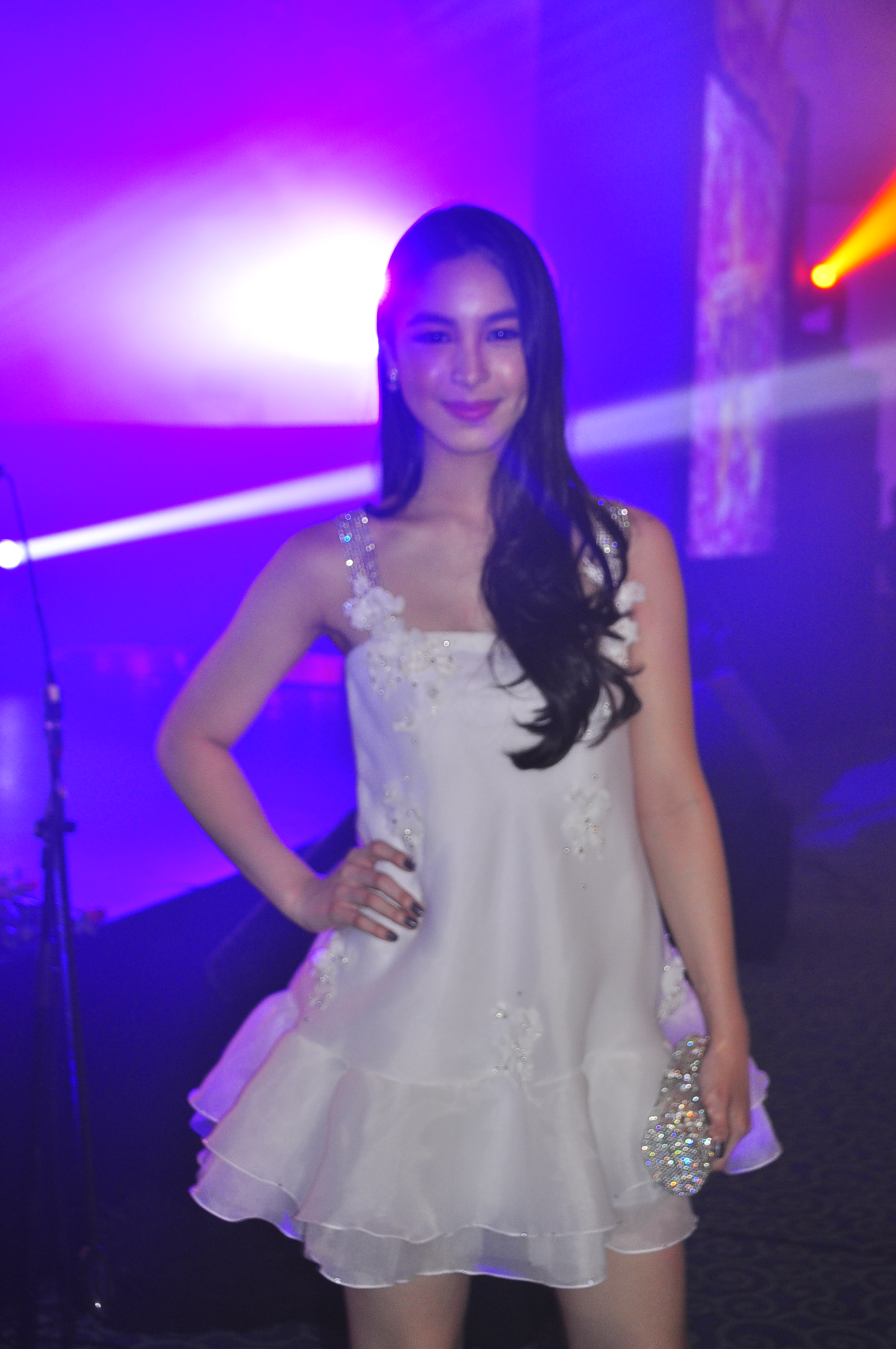
Julia Barretto portrays Zy.

- Joshua Garcia as Juancho Trinidad
- Julia Barretto as Zy Angeles
- Nonie Buencamino as Jun
- Kaila Estrada as Aiah
- Ketchup Eusebio as Bok
- John Lapus as JP
- Aljon Mendoza as Jon
- Bong Gonzales as Lei Angeles
- Ana Abad Santos as Anne
- Meann Espinosa as Lala
- Bianca de Vera as Tin
- Victor Silayan as Matt

== Production ==
On April 24, 2024, Joshua Garcia and Julia Barretto announced their upcoming film at the “New Movie Alert” virtual media conference on Star Cinema and Viva Films' YouTube channels. They also announced that Petersen Vargas will be the director of their film. The teaser poster of the film was also released on the same day.

On June 12, 2024, Star Cinema posted a sneak peek of the cast's first script reading through its social media pages. On June 28, 2024, they release a video and still photos from the set, which signifies that the filming has already begun. The filming wrapped up in mid-July, as shared by its cast members and director in their social media posts.

== Promotion ==
An official teaser was released by Star Cinema last July 1, 2024, which garnered 1 million views in one hour.

A series of mall shows called The Get Back Tour was held to kick off its promotional activities officially. The first mall show happened last July 5, 2024, at Market! Market! in Taguig. At the same event, they also unveiled the movie's official poster.

A 2-minute trailer was released on July 10, 2024, during the film's media conference. The event was attended by the writers, director Petersen Vargas, lead actors Joshua and Julia and other cast members.

On July 31, 2024, Metro magazine released a digital cover featuring the lead stars, Joshua and Julia. Along with it is an article describing the ex-couple's journey, how they reunited for the project and some snippets about the movie.

== Release ==
The film opened in 210 cinemas nationwide on August 14, 2024. A day before its general release, a premiere night was held on August 13, 2024, at SM Megamall, and it was graced by its cast, director, celebrity guests, and executives of ABS-CBN and Viva.

== Reception ==
=== Box office ===
Un/Happy For You grossed ₱450 million worldwide. On its opening day, the film debuted at ₱20.5 million, making it the highest-grossing opening day of a local film in 2024 and the top opening day for a non-MMFF local film post-pandemic, until it was surpassed by Hello, Love, Again in November. As of August 17, the film expanded to 320 cinemas nationwide and accumulated a four-day gross of ₱104 million.

According to Deadline Hollywood, the film had earned ₱150 million at the box office in five days, with over 450,000 admissions in 350 cinemas nationwide. It achieved the biggest post-pandemic single-day gross for a local film to date, with ₱46 million on August 18. By August 22, the film had grossed ₱200 million as it entered its second week. After ten days, the film's domestic box office total reached ₱253 million. Entering its third week in the domestic box office and shortly after it was released on select international markets, the film had achieved a worldwide gross of ₱320 million as of August 27 and ₱390 million as of September 2.

Out of the more than 100 films produced in the Philippines in 2024, Un/Happy for You is among the few films released so far to have been profitable at the box office.

=== Critical reception ===
The film received a score of 72/100 from 15 reviews according to review aggregator website Kritikultura, indicating a generally positive reception.

Fred Hawson, writing for ABS-CBN News and Current Affairs, described the chemistry between Garcia and Barretto as "still electric" because of their stellar performances in the film and also gave praise to the story and screenplay despite the little presence of romcom clichés and Vargas' direction.

=== Accolades ===
Accolades received by Un/Happy for You
Award	Date of ceremony	Category	Recipient(s)	Result	Ref.
41st Star Awards for Movies	November 30, 2025	Movie of the Year	Un/Happy for You	Nominated	
41st Star Awards for Movies	November 30, 2025	Movie Director of the Year	Petersen Vargas	Nominated	
41st Star Awards for Movies	November 30, 2025	Movie Actor of the Year	Joshua Garcia	Nominated	
41st Star Awards for Movies	November 30, 2025	Movie Supporting Actor of the Year	Nonie Buencamino	Nominated	
41st Star Awards for Movies	November 30, 2025	New Movie Actor of the Year	Aljon Mendoza	Nominated	
41st Star Awards for Movies	November 30, 2025	New Movie Actress of the Year	Bianca De Vera	Nominated	
41st Star Awards for Movies	November 30, 2025	New Movie Actress of the Year	Kaila Estrada	Won	
41st Star Awards for Movies	November 30, 2025	Movie Ensemble Acting of the Year	Un/Happy for You	Nominated	
41st Star Awards for Movies	November 30, 2025	Movie Cinematographer of the Year	Noel Teehankee	Nominated	
41st Star Awards for Movies	November 30, 2025	Movie Musical Scorer of the Year	Ammie Ruth Suarez	Nominated	
41st Star Awards for Movies	November 30, 2025	Movie Loveteam of the Year	Joshua Garcia & Julia Barretto (JoshLia)	Nominated	
