= Joshua Garcia =

Filipino actor (born 1997)

- Garcia in 2024
- Born: Joshua Espineli Garcia; October 7, 1997 (age 29); Bauan, Batangas, Philippines
- Occupation: Actor
- Years active: 2014–present
- Agent: Star Magic (2014–present)

Joshua Espineli Garcia (Tagalog pronunciation: [gaɾˈsɪa]; born October 7, 1997) is a Filipino actor. He began his professional acting career in 2015 after being part of the reality show Pinoy Big Brother: All In as a housemate.

He rose to prominence for his critically acclaimed performances in the 2016 Metro Manila Film Festival top-grosser Vince and Kath and James and in the primetime series The Good Son. Garcia has starred in various TV series such as Ngayon at Kailanman (2018), The Killer Bride (2019), Unbreak My Heart (2023), and It's Okay to Not Be Okay (2025). He has also starred in the films Love You to the Stars and Back (2017), Ang Mga Kaibigan Ni Mama Susan (2023), Un/Happy For You (2024), and Always Yours, Never Mine (2026).

== Early life ==
Garcia was born in Bauan, Batangas, Philippines. He is the son of Filipino parents Geo Garcia and Marife Espineli. Coming from a broken family, he was raised by his father and his priest uncle alongside his elder sister, Lorenza Mae. He also has three younger paternal half-siblings and two maternal half-siblings.

== Career ==
=== 2015–2016: Career beginnings and breakthrough ===
Fresh from his stint in Pinoy Big Brother, Garcia started his acting career via the afternoon series Nasaan Ka Nang Kailangan Kita alongside fellow housemates Jane Oineza and Loisa Andalio. In the same year, he made his film debut in a supporting role in the Maja Salvador starrer You're Still The One. Garcia's acting chops first garnered attention when he played a supporting character for the Olivia Lamasan movie Barcelona: A Love Untold starring Kathryn Bernardo and Daniel Padilla, which earned him a Best Supporting Actor nomination in the FAMAS Awards.

In 2016, he was included in the powerhouse ensemble cast of the family drama The Greatest Love.

Garcia's breakthrough came in when he got his first movie leading role in the 2016 Metro Manila Film Festival entry Vince and Kath and James where he won New Movie Actor of the Year in the 33rd PMPC Star Awards for Movies. His acting performance received wide critical acclaim and even scored Best Actor nominations in the said festival's awards, the 35th Luna Awards and the 2017 FAMAS Awards along with his Best Supporting Actor nomination for Barcelona: A Love Untold.

=== 2017–2020: Rising popularity and tandem with Julia Barretto ===
Following the blockbuster success of Vince and Kath and James and his tandem with actress Julia Barretto, they both starred in a string of television and movie projects together. Their tandem made their television debut in an episode of the country's longest-running drama anthology Maalaala Mo Kaya where they played as teen sweethearts who learn the value of unconditional love at a young age. Their performances was widely praised by the viewers and also dominated the trending topics on Twitter.

Later that year, Garcia starred in his follow-up movie with Barretto in the romantic comedy-drama Love You to the Stars and Back which was a box-office success. His portrayal of Caloy, a teen suffering from leukemia likewise earned himself another round of Best Actor nominations in FAMAS and Luna Awards. His partnership with Barretto in the box office continued in the same year with Unexpectedly Yours where they starred alongside veteran actors Sharon Cuneta and Robin Padilla.

In 2017, he headlined an ensemble cast in the crime drama primetime series The Good Son alongside Jerome Ponce, McCoy de Leon and Nash Aguas. He won various acting awards for his highly acclaimed portrayal in the series as Joseph Buenavidez including a "Best Drama Actor" recognition in the 32nd PMPC Star Awards for Television. In 2018, Garcia and Barretto starred in the romantic comedy movie I Love You, Hater with Kris Aquino. After four big-screen projects together, they finally made their teleserye debut via the primetime TV series Ngayon at Kailanman which premiered on August that same year.

In 2019, he was part of the lead cast of the primetime TV series The Killer Bride which paired him with actress Janella Salvador. This also reunited him with Maja Salvador from their previous collaboration in You're Still The One where he made his film acting debut.

In 2020, he was part of an all-star ensemble cast in the zombie film Block Z which was directed by award-winning director Mikhail Red. After his long-standing partnership with Barretto ended, he starred in various episodes of Maalaala Mo Kaya which include an episode entitled "Notebook" where his performance earned him an award for "Best Single Performance by an Actor" in the 35th PMPC Star Awards for Television.

=== 2021–present: Ultimate leading man of his generation ===
In 2021, he made a return to primetime television and joined the lead cast of the TV series Viral Scandal opposite Charlie Dizon. Later the following year, he starred as the male lead in ABS-CBN's TV adaptation of Mars Ravelo's Darna starring Jane de Leon which also reunited him with Janella Salvador.

In 2023, he starred in the movie adaptation of Bob Ong's best-selling book Ang Mga Kaibigan Ni Mama Susan which was streamed worldwide through Prime Video. He also topbilled the cast of the romantic drama TV series Unbreak My Heart with Jodi Sta. Maria, Richard Yap and Gabbi Garcia which is a historic partnership and co-production of his home network ABS-CBN and long-time rival GMA Network.

Garcia reunited with Barretto in the 2024 romantic drama movie Un/Happy For You, which was a box-office success. The following year, he starred in the Philippine adaptation of the South Korean drama It's Okay to Not Be Okay alongside Anne Curtis and Carlo Aquino.

In 2026, Garcia starred opposite Ivana Alawi in the Prime Video romantic drama Love Is Never Gone. Following the success of Un/Happy For You, he collaborated anew with Barretto in the film Always Yours, Never Mine, marking their seventh film together.

== Personal life ==
Garcia dated actress Julia Barretto after starring in numerous projects together as a love team. Their two-year relationship ended in April 2019.

He started taking an entrepreneurship course at Southville International School affiliated with Foreign Universities (SISFU) in 2020 at the height of the COVID-19 pandemic. In 2023, he enrolled in a culinary course at the Center for Asian Culinary Studies.

== Filmography ==
=== Film ===
Year	Title	Role	Ref.
2015	You're Still The One	Ericson	
2016	Barcelona: A Love Untold	Tonying	
2016	Vince and Kath and James	Michael Vincent "Vince" Arcilla	
2017	Love You To The Stars and Back	Caloy Enriquez	
2017	Unexpectedly Yours	Jason Manlangit	
2018	I Love You, Hater	Joko Macaraeg	
2020	Block Z	Lucas	
2020	James and Pat and Dave	Michael Vincent "Vince" Arcilla	
2023	Ang Mga Kaibigan Ni Mama Susan	Gilberto "Galo" Manansala	
2024	Fruitcake	Cardo	
2024	Un/Happy For You	Juancho Trinidad	
2024	Inside Out 2	Lance Slashblade (voice - Filipino dub)	
2025	Meet, Greet & Bye	Brad Facundo	
2026	Always Yours, Never Mine	Apollo Amador	

=== Television ===
Year	Title	Role	Ref.
2014	Pinoy Big Brother: All In	Himself / Housemate	
2015–present	ASAP	Himself / Performer	
2015	Nasaan Ka Nang Kailangan Kita	Joel Galvez	
2015	Luv U	Dionard	
2016	Maalaala Mo Kaya: Itlog	Pablo	
2016	Maalaala Mo Kaya: Puno	Ernesto	
2016	Maalaala Mo Kaya: Puno	Barbie	
2016	Ipaglaban Mo: Lason	Emman	
2016–2017	The Greatest Love	Zosimo "Z" A. Cruz	
2017	Maalaala Mo Kaya: Bituin	John Michael Española	
2017–2018	The Good Son	Joseph Reyes-Buenavidez	
2018–2019	Ngayon at Kailanman	Innocencio "Inno" S. Cortes	
2019	Maalaala Mo Kaya: Medalya	Ian Paquit	
2019–2020	The Killer Bride	Elias Sanchez	
2020	Maalaala Mo Kaya: Tren	Jason Carale	
2020	Maalaala Mo Kaya: Notebook	Arnel Amaro	
2021–2022	Viral Scandal	Kyle Constantino	
2022–2023	Mars Ravelo's Darna	Brian Robles	
2023	Unbreak My Heart	Lorenzo "Renz" Isidro	
2025	It's Okay to Not Be Okay	Patrick "Patpat" Gonzales	
2026	Love Is Never Gone	Mateo "Teo" Crisanto	

== Discography ==
Singles
Year	Song title	Album	Company
2015	Walang Iba	Nasaan Ka Nang Kailangan Kita Soundtrack	Star Music
2016	Hey Crush	Vince and Kath and James Soundtrack	Star Music

== Accolades ==
Awards and NominationsAwards and nominations received by Joshua Garcia
Award	Year	Category	Nominated work	Result	Ref.
ALTA Media Icon Awards	2018	Most Promising Male Star for TV	The Good Son	Won	
ALTA Media Icon Awards	2018	Best Love Team (with Julia Barretto)	—N/a	Won	
ALTA Media Icon Awards	2026	Best Actor for Television	It's Okay to Not Be Okay	Won	
Anak TV Awards	2017	Makabata Star Awardee	—N/a	Won	
Anak TV Awards	2018	Makabata Star Awardee	—N/a	Won	
Anak TV Awards	2019	Makabata Star Awardee	—N/a	Won	
Anak TV Awards	2023	Makabata Star Awardee	—N/a	Nominated	
Anak TV Awards	2024	Makabata Star Awardee	—N/a	Won	
Anak TV Awards	2025	Makabata Star Awardee	—N/a	Won	
Aral Parangal Awards	2018	Movie Actor of the Year	Vince & Kath & James	Won	
Bulacan State University Batarisan Awards	2018	Best Male TV Personality	The Good Son	Won	
Comguild Academe	2018	Most Loved Male Endorser	—N/a	Won	
Comguild Academe	2019	Male Endorser of the Year	—N/a	Nominated	
The EDDYS	2018	Best Actor	Love You To The Stars and Back	Nominated	
The EDDYS	2025	Box Office Hero	Un/Happy for You	Won	
The EDDYS	2026	Best Actor	Meet, Greet & Bye	Nominated	
The EDDYS	2026	Box Office Hero	Meet, Greet & Bye	Won	
EdukCircle Awards	2018	Best Actor in a TV Series	The Good Son	Won	
EdukCircle Awards	2018	Most Influential Film Actor of the Year	Unexpectedly Yours	Nominated	
EdukCircle Awards	2018	Most Influential Endorser of the Year	—N/a	Nominated	
EdukCircle Awards	2018	Love Team of the Year (with Julia Barretto)	—N/a	Won	
EdukCircle Awards	2019	Best Actor in a TV Series	Ngayon at Kailanman	Nominated	
EdukCircle Awards	2019	Most Influential Endorser of the Year	—N/a	Nominated	
FAMAS Award	2017	Best Actor	Vince & Kath & James	Nominated	
FAMAS Award	2017	Best Supporting Actor	Barcelona: A Love Untold	Nominated	
FAMAS Award	2017	Best Theme Song	Hey Crush	Nominated	
FAMAS Award	2018	Best Actor	Love You To The Stars and Back	Nominated	
FAMAS Award	2018	Male Celebrity of the Night	—N/a	Won	
Face Of Advertising and Marketing Excellence	2018	Most Promising Couple Endorser (with Julia Barretto)	—N/a	Won	
Gawad Balisong	2022	Outstanding Filipino Gamechanger of 2022 (Entertainment)	—N/a	Won	
Gawad Bedista	2018	Actor of the Year	—N/a	Won	
Gawad Bedista	2018	Media Personality of the Year (Male)	—N/a	Nominated	
Gawad Dangal Filipino Awards	2022	Best Actor in a Teleserye	Darna	Won	
Gawad Lasallianeta	2020	Most Outstanding TV Performance by an Actor	Maalaala Mo Kaya: "Medalya"	Won	
Gawad Lasallianeta	2022	Most Outstanding Actor in a Drama Series	Darna	Nominated	
Gawad Lasallianeta	2022	Most Outstanding Social Media Personality	—N/a	Nominated	
Gawad Lasallianeta	2023	Most Outstanding Actor in a Drama Series	Unbreak My Heart	Nominated	
Gawad Lasallianeta	2023	Most Outstanding Brand Endorser	—N/a	Nominated	
Gawad Lasallianeta	2023	Most Outstanding Social Media Personality	—N/a	Nominated	
Gawad Lasallianeta	2026	Most Outstanding Actor in a Lead Role	It's Okay to Not Be Okay	Nominated	
Gawad PASADO	2018	PinakaPASADOng Aktor sa Teleserye	The Good Son	Won	
Gawad PASADO	2021	PinakaPASADOng Katuwang na Aktor	Block Z	Nominated	
Gawad PASADO	2026	PinakaPASADOng Aktor	Meet, Greet & Bye	Won	
Gawad Pilipino Awards	2022	Outstanding Performance by an Actor	Darna	Won	
Gawad TANGLAW	2018	Best Ensemble Acting	The Good Son	Won	
Gawad Urian Awards	2026	Best Supporting Actor	Meet, Greet & Bye	Nominated	
GEMS Gabi Ng Parangal	2019	Best Actor	Ngayon at Kailanman	Nominated	
GMMSF Box Office Entertainment Awards	2017	Most Promising Movie Actor of the Year	Vince & Kath & James	Won	
GMMSF Box Office Entertainment Awards	2018	Most Popular Love Team of Movies & TV (with Julia Barretto)	—N/a	Won	
GMMSF Box Office Entertainment Awards	2018	Best Ensemble Performance in a Drama Series	The Good Son	Won	
GMMSF Box Office Entertainment Awards	2019	Prince of Philippine Movies & TV	—N/a	Won	
GMMSF Box Office Entertainment Awards	2019	Male Celebrity of the Night	—N/a	Won	
GMMSF Box Office Entertainment Awards	2020	Prince of Philippine Television	—N/a	Won	
Golden Laurel Awards	2018	Most Promising Love Team of the Year (with Julia Barretto)	—N/a	Nominated	
Golden Laurel Awards	2018	Best TV Actor	The Good Son	Won	
Golden Laurel Awards	2019	Best TV Actor	Ngayon at Kailanman	Nominated	
Golden Laurel Awards	2019	Favorite Love Team (with Julia Barretto)	—N/a	Nominated	
Golden Laurel Awards	2022	Best Drama Actor	Viral Scandal	Won	
Golden Laurel Awards	2023	Best Drama Actor	Darna	Won	
Inside Showbiz Awards	2019	Favorite Movie Actor	I Love You, Hater	Nominated	
Inside Showbiz Awards	2019	Favorite TV Actor	The Good Son	Nominated	
Inside Showbiz Awards	2019	Favorite Love Team (with Julia Barretto)	—N/a	Won	
Kabantugan Awards	2018	Best Movie Actor	Love You To The Stars and Back	Won	
Kids' Choice Awards	2018	Favorite Pinoy Newbie	—N/a	Nominated	
Laurus Nobilis Media Excellence Awards	2026	Media Excellence in Television Drama Acting (Male Category)	It's Okay to Not Be Okay	Won	
Luna Award	2017	Best Actor	Vince & Kath & James	Nominated	
Luna Award	2018	Best Actor	Love You To The Stars and Back	Nominated	
Metro Manila Film Festival	2016	Best Actor	Vince & Kath & James	Nominated	
Paragala Central Luzon Media Awards	2018	Best Actor in Film	Vince & Kath & James	Nominated	
Platinum Stallion Awards	2018	Youth Character Model of the Year	—N/a	Won	
PMPC Star Awards for Movies	2017	New Movie Actor of the Year	Vince & Kath & James	Won	
PMPC Star Awards for Movies	2017	Movie Love Team of the Year (with Julia Barretto)	Vince & Kath & James	Nominated	
PMPC Star Awards for Movies	2018	Movie Actor of the Year	Love You To The Stars and Back	Nominated	
PMPC Star Awards for Movies	2018	Movie Love Team of the Year (with Julia Barretto)	Love You To The Stars and Back	Won	
PMPC Star Awards for Movies	2018	Male Face of the Night	—N/a	Won	
PMPC Star Awards for Movies	2019	Movie Love Team of the Year (with Julia Barretto)	I Love You, Hater	Nominated	
PMPC Star Awards for Movies	2022	Movie Love Team of the Year (with Julia Barretto)	Block Z	Nominated	
PMPC Star Awards for Movies	2026	Movie Actor of the Year	Meet, Greet & Bye	Pending	
PMPC Star Awards for Television	2015	Best New Male TV Personality	Nasaan Ka Nang Kailangan Kita	Nominated	
PMPC Star Awards for Television	2017	Best Drama Supporting Actor	The Greatest Love	Nominated	
PMPC Star Awards for Television	2017	German Moreno Power Tandem Award (with Julia Barretto)	—N/a	Won	
PMPC Star Awards for Television	2018	Best Drama Actor	The Good Son	Won	
PMPC Star Awards for Television	2019	Best Drama Actor	Ngayon at Kailanman	Nominated	
PMPC Star Awards for Television	2019	Best Single Performance by An Actor	Maalaala Mo Kaya: "Medalya"	Nominated	
PMPC Star Awards for Television	2021	Best Drama Actor	The Killer Bride	Nominated	
PMPC Star Awards for Television	2021	Best Single Performance by An Actor	Maalaala Mo Kaya: "Tren"	Nominated	
PMPC Star Awards for Television	2023	Best Single Performance by An Actor	Maalaala Mo Kaya: "Notebook"	Won	
PMPC Star Awards for Television	2024	Best Drama Actor	Unbreak My Heart	Won	
PMPC Star Awards for Television	2024	Face of the Night	—N/a	Won	
PUSH Awards	2020	Male TV Performance of the Year	Maalaala Mo Kaya: " "Medalya"	Won	
RAWR Awards	2018	Actor of the Year	The Good Son	Won	
RAWR Awards	2019	Actor of the Year	Ngayon at Kailanman	Nominated	
Star Cinema Online Awards	2014	Most Promising Actor	—N/a	Won	
TAG Awards Chicago	2022	Best Actor	Darna	Nominated	
TAG Awards Chicago	2023	Best Actor	Unbreak My Heart	Won	
TikTok Philippines Awards	2022	Celebrity of the Year	—N/a	Won	
VP Choice Awards	2019	TV Actor of the Year	Ngayon at Kailanman	Nominated	
VP Choice Awards	2023	TV Actor of the Year	Darna	Nominated	
