= Block Z =

2020 Philippine zombie film by Mikhail Red

- Theatrical release poster
- Directed by: Mikhail Red
- Screenplay by: Mixkaella Villalon
- Story by: Mikhail Red; Mixkaella Villalon
- Produced by: John Paul Abellera; Kara Kintanar
- Starring: Joshua Garcia; Julia Barretto; Ina Raymundo; Dimples Romana; Maris Racal; Yves Flores; Myrtle Sarrosa; McCoy de Leon; Ian Veneracion
- Cinematography: Steven Paul Evangelio
- Edited by: Nikolas Red
- Music by: Myka Magsaysay-Sigua; Paul Sigua
- Production company: ABS-CBN Film Productions Keep Filming
- Distributed by: Star Cinema
- Release date: January 29, 2020
- Running time: 103 minutes
- Country: Philippines
- Language: Filipino
- Budget: ₱33 million
- Box office: ₱36 million (as of February 5, 2020)

Block Z is a 2020 Philippine action horror film directed by Mikhail Red and starring Joshua Garcia, Julia Barretto, Dimples Romana, Yves Flores, Myrtle Sarrosa, Maris Racal, McCoy de Leon, Ian Veneracion, and Ina Raymundo. It follows a group of university students who try to survive the undead during a deadly viral outbreak. The film was theatrically released on January 29, 2020.

== Plot ==
Former OFW Mario drives his daughter PJ, a senior year medical student, to San Lazaro University. Mario has a strained relationship with PJ, who is still traumatized from failing to save her mother from a fatal stroke. At the university, PJ meets with her Block Z block mates: her friends Erika and Myles, and basketball team captain Lucas, who has feelings for her. After dropping her off, Mario accidentally hits a pedestrian and drives the man back to the university hospital, where PJ and her friends work.

PJ and Erika tend to Angie, who suffers a bite wound. Angie suddenly has a seizure and dies. PJ goes to comfort Angie's young daughter Ruby. As Myles and fellow student Gary bring Angie's body to the morgue, she reanimates and bites Gary's neck, causing Myles to flee. Angie infects the hospital staff and patients, who in turn infect students and personnel on campus.

Lucas, whose entire basketball team is infected, meets with Mario and the pedestrian. The pediestrian is bitten and turned, forcing the two to kill him. The two then split up to look for PJ.

The military quarantines the university, and shoots both zombies and students fleeing from the front gate. Student council president Gelo's father, a general, arranges a helicopter evacuation for him. He reveals this to vice president Vanessa, who secretly informs the other councilors. Lucas finds PJ, Erika and Myles. The four look for an escape.

An argument break out between Gelo and Vanessa regarding her revealing the news of the evacuation. After a scuffle, Gelo accidentally pushes Vanessa off a staircase, killing her in view of PJ's group. Lying that she was infected, he joins the group.

They five go to the hospital, and are overwhelmed with zombies. Mario guides them to the school's church, where he has been taking shelter with Ruby and security guard Bebeth. Gelo reveals the helicopter can only fit two people, which angers the others before the group convinces him that he needs them to survive.

As the group passes by the faculty building, Ruby sees her mother and rushes to her, alerting the zombie swarm. As Ruby is devoured, Gelo locks himself inside the faculty building, forcing the rest to flee.

The group rests in the dormitory, where PJ and Mario reconcile. Mario is bitten by a zombie, and urges the group to kill him. They lock him inside the dorm's closet, and he says his final goodbyes to PJ. As they make their way to the roof, the group slowly dwindles until only PJ makes it to the helipad.

PJ loses consciousness and awakens the next day with no helicopter in sight. Noticing a bite mark on her hand, she realizes that she is immune to the virus. She fights her way back to the dormitory, and reunites with Mario, who is also immune. They descend an ancient tunnel underneath the church, previously discovered by Ruby. Evading Gelo, who is delirious from being infected and abandoned, the two escape through a manhole. PJ and Mario realize that the infection has spread throughout city, and arm themselves.

News reports share the zombie's vulnerability to water. Bebeth broadcasts a message that she had survived. A large typhoon arrives, weakening and killing many of the undead in the process. Two weeks later, a group of survivors discover a badly-injured Lucas, and takes him in.

== Cast ==
- Joshua Garcia as Lucas, a varsity basketball team captain in San Lazaro and PJ's love interest
- Julia Barretto as Princess Joy “PJ”, a medical student from San Lazaro University and Lucas’ love interest
- Ian Veneracion as Mario, PJ's doting father
- Ina Raymundo as Angie, a mother who becomes patient zero of the outbreak within the university
- Dimples Romana as Bebeth, a guard at San Lazaro University
- Maris Racal as Erika, PJ's best friend
- McCoy de Leon as Myles, a medical student who is friends with PJ, Erika, and Lucas
- Yves Flores as Gelo, the student council president and son of a prominent corrupt general
- Angel Locsin as raider general
- Miel Espinoza as Ruby
- Myrtle Sarrosa as Vanessa, the social media-savvy vice president of the school's student council
- Jon Lucas as Ivan
- Timothy Castillo as Caloy
- Yayo Aguila as PJ's mom
- Eisen Lim as Gary
- Jan Silverio as Jun
- Jaycee Navarro as Mr. Galzote
- Sherilyn Castor as Mrs. Galzote
- Francine Delos Reyes as Lean
- Giovanni Baldisseri as Chancellor Brazal

Filmmaker Kip Oebanda cameos as a zombie in the film.

== Production ==
Block Z marked the sixth feature film and second studio film for director Mikhail Red, following Rekorder (2013), Birdshot (2016), Neomanila (2017), Eerie (2019), and Dead Kids (2019). The film is also said to be Red's "most ambitious project yet". Filming began in March 2019, and ended in July 2019. Shooting took place in Manila and Quezon City.

According to Red, the film featured fast-running zombies in the same vein as in 28 Days Later.

== Marketing ==
The teaser trailer was released on July 5, 2019, on YouTube, followed by the full trailer which was released on December 31, 2019, on YouTube, and the full movie was released on March 3, 2024 after the release of the movie was 4 years and was released to Youtube.

== Release ==
The film was theatrically released on January 29, 2020.

=== Television release ===
==== Pay-per-view ====
The film premiered on KBO from April 3–7, 2020, as part of "Star Cinema Movies Now Na!" promotion (along with James & Pat & Dave on the same channel from April 9–14, 2020), two months after its theatrical release.

==== Cable television ====
The film premiered on the channel Cinema One on July 5, 2020, five days after ABS-CBN TV Plus and Sky Direct channels temporarily ceased operations due to the alias cease and desist order by the National Telecommunications Commission due to expiration of franchises of ABS-CBN and Sky Cable last May 4, 2020. The film also premiered on Kapamilya Channel on October 3, 2020.

==== Free-to-air ====
The film premiered on A2Z Channel 11 on November 7, 2020.
