= Meet, Greet & Bye =

2025 family drama film by Cathy Garcia-Sampana

- Theatrical release poster
- Directed by: Cathy Garcia-Sampana
- Screenplay by: Jumbo A. Albano; Patrick R. Valencia; Cathy Garcia-Sampana
- Story by: Jumbo A. Albano
- Produced by: Kara U. Kintanar; Patrick R. Valencia
- Starring: Maricel Soriano; Piolo Pascual; Joshua Garcia; Belle Mariano; Juan Karlos Labajo
- Cinematography: Dan Villegas
- Edited by: Marya Ignacio
- Music by: Cesar Francis S. Concio
- Production company: ABS-CBN Film Productions
- Distributed by: Star Cinema; ABS-CBN Studios
- Release date: November 12, 2025
- Running time: 107 minutes
- Country: Philippines
- Language: Filipino
- Box office: ₱305 million

Meet, Greet & Bye (stylized in all lowercase) is a 2025 Philippine family drama film directed by Cathy Garcia-Sampana from a screenplay she co-wrote with Jumbo A. Albano, who solely developed the story concept, and Patrick R. Valencia, who also served as a producer. Produced by Star Cinema, the film stars Maricel Soriano, Piolo Pascual, Joshua Garcia, Belle Mariano, and Juan Karlos Labajo.

The film marks Piolo Pascual's return to the family drama film genre since his 2002 film, Dekada '70. It also marks as his comeback movie with Star Cinema since his 2017 film, Last Night with Toni Gonzaga and reunite with Maricel Soriano after 24 years since their 2001 film, Mila. The film also marks Juan Karlos Labajo's debut movie with Star Cinema and his first time working with Cathy Garcia-Sampana.

== Cast ==
=== Main cast ===
- Maricel Soriano as Baby Lopez-Facundo
- Piolo Pascual as Christopher "Tupe" Lopez-Facundo: eldest son of Baby
  - KD Estrada as Young Tupe
- Joshua Garcia as Brad Lopez-Facundo: older son of Baby
- Belle Mariano as Geri Ann Lopez-Facundo: daughter of Tupe
- Juan Karlos Labajo as Leonardo "Leo" Lopez-Facundo: youngest son of Baby

=== Supporting cast ===
- Kaila Estrada as Angie
- Kaori Oinuma as Jen: partner of Leo
- Zeke Sarmiento as Charlie Facundo: older son Leo and Jen
- Matet de Leon as Jona
- Jeffrey Tam as Kerwin
- Madeleine Nicolas as Tere
- Marnie Lapus as Belen
- Kit Thompson as Boyet Facundo: late husband of Baby
- Robbie Jaworski as Lester
- Marina Benipayo as Dr. Sandico
- Mitch Valdez as Mrs. Villaflor
- Cecil Paz as Mayora
- Frenchie Dy as Scammer

=== Special participation ===
- Park Seo-joon as himself
- Ryan Bang as Park Seo-joon's friend

== Marketing ==
The movie was officially announced in Star Cinema's social media pages and YouTube channel on June 23, 2025. Its official teaser was released on September 17, 2025 and have garnered millions of views within few hours from its release.

On October 4, 2025 three major events took place. First is the release of the film's official poster which was unveiled via the ELJ Billboard. To hype things more, the ELJ Building was lit up with the film's jargon "MGB". Lastly, the film's official website was launched that provides access to all information about the film, its casting, related articles, and even link for ticket purchase.

During the film's media conference held on October 8, 2025, the highly emotional trailer was released leaving both the actors and the press in tears.

On October 20, 2025, one of the lead stars, Belle Mariano appeared in the US morning news program, Good Day L.A. to promote the movie which will also premiere in US and other countries. Mariano also attended the East Meets West event in Los Angeles hosted by FilAm Creative community.

Pascual and Mariano attended more interviews and panel discussions in Vancouver and California after both took part in ASAP 30th Anniversary show in Canada.

== Reception ==
=== Box office ===
Meet, Greet, & Bye grossed ₱10.5 million on its first day in theaters, becoming the second highest opening day gross for a local film of 2025. The film then garnered ₱33 million at the box-office within its first three days and rosed to ₱85 million, five days since its premiere. By November 18, 2025, the film grossed more than ₱120 million worldwide, becoming the second highest-grossing Filipino film of 2025.

The film became the highest-grossing Filipino film of 2025 by November 21, 2025 with ₱175 million worldwide gross, surpassing My Love Will Make You Disappear.
