= P-pop Music Awards 2024 =

2024 awards ceremony for music

- Date: December 28, 2024
- Venue: New Frontier Theater; Cubao, Quezon City
- Country: Philippines
- Acts: Josh Cullen; Al James; Hori7on; KAIA; 1st.One; CALISTA; New Id; BILIB
- Most wins: BINI (7)
- Most nominations: BINI (9)

The 9th P-pop Music Awards ceremony was held at the New Frontier Theater on December 28, 2024. This awarding ceremony honors the talent, creativity, and cultural influence of Filipino artists in their works.

== Background ==
Following the success of the previous ceremonies, the 9th P-pop Music Awards is set to gather fans on-site and viewers online via a livestream. That includes the main carpet and the event itself.

For the on-site viewers, tickets are available for individuals with different tiers, VIP being the highest and bronze being the lowest.

== Winners and nominees ==
The list of nominees and winners are adapted from GMA Network, and Manila Bulletin. Winners are listed first and highlighted in boldface.

Artist of the Year	Song of the Year
**BINI**; Dionela; FELIP; Josh Cullen; Maki	**"Pantropiko"** **– BINI**; "Dilaw" – Maki; "Moonlight" – SB19, Ian Asher, Terry Zhong; "Salamin, Salamin" – BINI; "Sining" – Dionela (featuring Jay R.)
Album of the Year	Music Video of the Year
**"Talaarawan" – BINI**; "Alon" – Pablo; "Isapuso" – Alamat; "Lost and Found" – Josh Cullen; "7SINS" – FELIP	**"Salamin, Salamin" – BINI**; "Cherry on Top" – BINI; "Dilaw" – Maki; "The Boy Who Cried Wolf" – Pablo; "Surreal" – Justin
Collaboration of the Year	Production Design in a Music Video
**"Yoko Na"** **– Josh Cullen and Al James**; "Determinado" – Pablo and Josue; "Gupit" – Alamat and The Juans; "Kalakal" – SB19 and Gloc-9; "Sining" – Dionela (featuring Jay R.)	**"Salamin, Salamin" – BINI**; "The Boy Who Cried Wolf" – Pablo; "Surreal" – Justin; "Namumula" – Maki; "Misteryoso" – Cup of Joe
Concert of the Year	Choreography in a Live Performance
**"Grand BINIVerse" – BINI**; "Daytour: Anchor High" – HORI7ON; "7SINS The Album Concert" – Felip; "Lost & Found The Album Concert" – Josh Cullen; "Pagtatag World Tour" – SB19	**"Butata" – Pablo**; "Paalam Na" – 1st.One; "Patintero" – BGYO; "Sandal" – VXON; "Walang Biruan" – KAIA
Breakthrough Artist of the Year	Vocal Arrangement in a Song
**Maki**; BINI; Cup of Joe; Dionela; G22	**"You Did It" – KAIA**; "Ikaw at Ikaw" – 1621BC; "Laging Naroon Ka" – Yes My Love; "Isa Dalawa Tatlo" – Press Hit Play; "Paalam Na" – 1st.One
Rising Boy Group of the Year	Rising Girl Group of the Year
**Hori7on**; BILIB; New ID; PLUUS; 1ST ONE	**KAIA**; DIONE; G22; Calista; YGIG
Solo Artist of the Year	Fandom of the Year
**Josh Cullen**; James Reid; FELIP; Stell; Maki	**Bloom(s) – BINI**
Cultural Excellence Award	New Artist of the Year
**Alamat**	**Aster**; **New ID**
PPOP Frontier	PPOP Icon
**XLR8**	**SB19**
PPOP Spotlights	PPOP Potential
**Calista**; **1st.One**	**1621 BC**; **BILIB**
Regional Song of the Year	Favorite Streamed Artist
**"Kanako"** – **Felip**	**BINI**; **Maki**; **Dionela**

== Artists with multiple nominations and awards ==
List of artist(s) that received multiple awards
Artist	Number of wins	Awards received
BINI	8 awards	Artist of the Year; Song of the Year; Album of the Year; Music Video of the Year; Production Design in a Music Video; Concert of the Year; Fandom of the Year; Favorite Streamed Artist (shared with Maki and Dionela)
Josh Cullen	2 awards	Solo Artist of the Year; Collaboration of the Year (shared with Al James)

List of artists that received multiple nominations
Artist	Number of nominations
BINI	8 nominations
Maki	6 nominations
Josh Cullen	5 nominations
Pablo	5 nominations
FELIP	4 nominations
Dionela	4 nominations
SB19	3 nominations
KAIA	3 nominations
HORI7ON	2 nominations
1st.One	2 nominations
G22	2 nominations

== Performers ==
The following are the list of performers in the 2024 P-pop Music Awards adapted by GMA Network.

List of performers in the 2024 P-Pop Music Awards
- Josh Cullen
- Al James
- Hori7on
- Kaia
- 1st.One
- Calista
- New Id
- Bilib
