= Dayang (song) =

- Official single cover

Single by Alamat

from the album Isapuso
- Language: Tausūg; Tagalog
- English title: Princess
- Released: March 26, 2024
- Genre: Pop
- Length: 3:51
- Label: Viva
- Composer: Sean Cedro
- Producer: Thyro Alfaro

Alamat singles chronology
"Dagundong" (2023)	"Dayang" (2024)	"Gupit" (2024)

Music video
- "Dayang" on YouTube

"Dayang" (lit. 'Princess') is a song recorded by the Filipino pop group Alamat. The group released its music video starring Kyosu Guinto and Jaja Disuanco on March 26, 2024, and a single album for the song on March 27, containing R&B and acoustic remixes of "Dayang". Originally a track from Alamat's 2023 album Isapuso, "Dayang" is a pop song about finding love again after a failed romantic relationship. Its lyrics are written in Tausūg and Tagalog. The song received favorable reviews from critics, with CNN Philippines' Ian Urrutia hailing it as "pop perfection".

== Background and release ==
In July 2023, the Filipino pop group Alamat announced at the PPOPCON that they would release their first full-length album Isapuso (transl. Take to Heart) in November that year. The single "Dagundong" (transl. Rumbling) was released on November 3, then the full Isapuso album on November 4. "Dayang" (transl. Princess) was initially included as a track on the album. On March 27, 2024, Alamat released a three-track single album for "Dayang", including the original version, as well as R&B and acoustic remixes of the song, following six consecutive third debut anniversary shows from March 15 to 16.

== Composition and lyrics ==
"Dayang" is three minutes and 51 seconds long. It is a pop song. Nylon Manila's Nica Glorioso described its sound as "mellower but still upbeat", while ABS-CBN News' April Anne Benjamin called it "upbeat" and "festive".

The song's title is a Tausūg word meaning "princess". Lyrically, the song is about finding love again after heartbreak. The lyrics are written in Tausūg and Tagalog.

== Reception ==
The song received favorable reviews from critics. Ian Urrutia of CNN Philippines hailed the song as "pop perfection". Regene Narciso of Village Pipol lauded the song for highlighting the group's trademark blend of pop and indigenous sounds. Nica Glorioso of Nylon Manila described it as "classic" boy band music full of rhythm and romance.

== Music video ==
A music video starring Kyosu Guinto and Jaja Disuanco was released on March 26, 2024. To honor the song's Tausūg essence, the choreography for "Dayang" incorporates dances and martial arts that are native to or commonly practiced in Mindanao, such as the pangasik (the male equivalent of the pangalay dance), kuntaw, silat, and tariray.

== Personnel ==
Credits are adapted from Tidal.

- Alamat - vocals
- Thyro Alfaro - production (original and R&B versions), arrangement (original version)
- Sean Cedro - composition, lyrics (all versions), arrangement (acoustic version)
- Jason Paul Laxamana - production (acoustic version)
- Cursebox - arrangement (R&B version)
