= Isapuso =

Studio album by Alamat
- Released: November 3, 2023
- Studio: Studio Z
- Genre: Pop; contemporary R&B; hip-hop; disco; funk; city pop; dance-pop; pop ballad; Pinoy pop; Visayan pop
- Length: 26:15
- Language: Bicolano; Cebuano; English; Ilocano; Kalinga; Kapampangan; Tagalog; Tausūg
- Label: Viva
- Producer: Thyro Alfaro; Alas Alvarez; Cursebox (Michael Negapatan); Johan Gustafson; Jason Paul Laxamana; Ralph Joseph Lim

Alamat chronology
Pasulong (2022)	Isapuso (2023)	Destino (2025)

Singles from Isapuso
- 1. "Day and Night" Released: June 14, 2023; 2. "Walang Hanggan" Released: August 11, 2023; 3. "Dagundong" Released: November 3, 2023; 4. "Dayang" Released: March 26, 2024

Isapuso (lit. 'Take to Heart'; stylized as IsaPuso (Note: This gives the title a dual meaning. While "isapuso" is a verb meaning "take to heart" in Tagalog, the phrase "isa puso" means "one heart".)) is the first studio album by the Filipino boy band Alamat. It was released by Viva Records on November 3, 2023, after their first extended play (EP), Pasulong (transl. Forward), in 2022. Isapuso encompasses a range of musical genres, including styles that the group has traditionally employed such as pop and R&B, with new influences such as disco. The album also features several Philippine languages, reinforcing the group's advocacy of cultural and linguistic diversity.

Isapuso received critical acclaim, with most of its tracks appearing on year-end and "best of" lists. The album was also nominated for Album of the Year at the 9th P-pop Music Awards.

== Background and production ==
The Philippine pop boy band Alamat underwent nine months of training by Viva Records, with creative direction by Ninuno Media. They debuted with the multilingual single, "Kbye" (stylized in all lowercase), on February 14, 2021. In a press release, Ninuno Media emphasized the group's commitment to representing the Philippines' cultural and linguistic diversity. Following the premiere of their singles in 2021 and 2022, Alamat released their first EP, Pasulong (transl. Forward), in October 2022. It included tracks such as "Maharani" (transl. Queen), which Nylon Manila described as a "career-defining" track. In July 2023, Alamat announced at the PPOPCON that they would release their first full-length album Isapuso in November 2023. Jason Paul Laxamana, the group's creative director, explained that the album's title was wordplay between the Tagalog (Note: Tagalog is mutually intelligible with its standardized, official variety called "Filipino", and the two terms are often used interchangeably.) words isapuso, meaning "take to heart", and isa(ng) puso, meaning "one heart".

Production for the eight songs of the album took place within the span of a year altogether. There was no standard procedure for the production of each track on the album. For example, producer Thyro Alfaro sent the demo for "Dagundong" (transl. Rumbling) to the group. Later, the members simply studied their parts and recorded the song. However, the other tracks entailed different production processes. For instance, the group had total creative freedom on "Noli" (transl. Do Not). The Isapuso track was written and arranged by Mo as well as produced, mixed, and mastered by Alas and R-Ji, all of whom are members of Alamat.

== Music and lyrics ==
Some of the musical instruments used in the album Isapuso

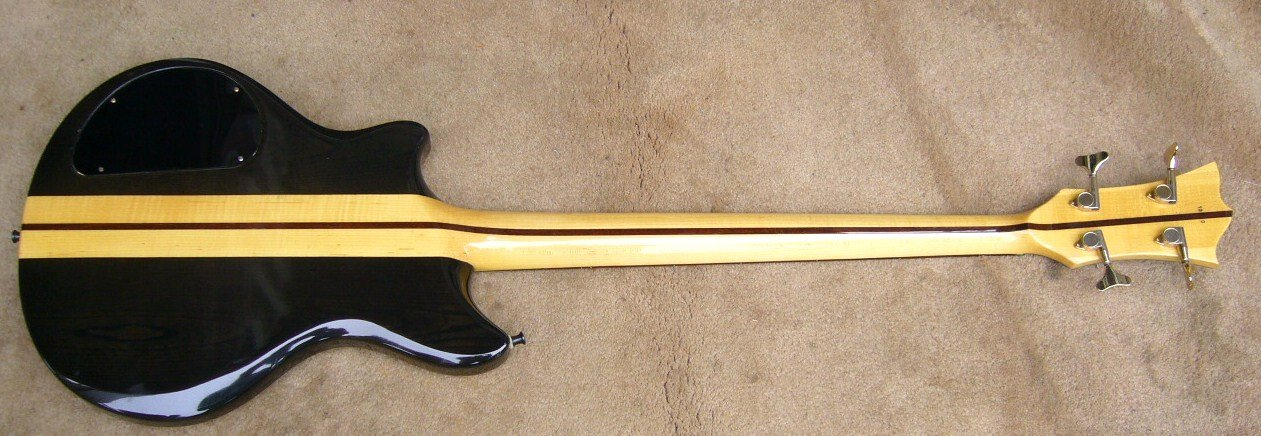
Electric guitar ("Noli")

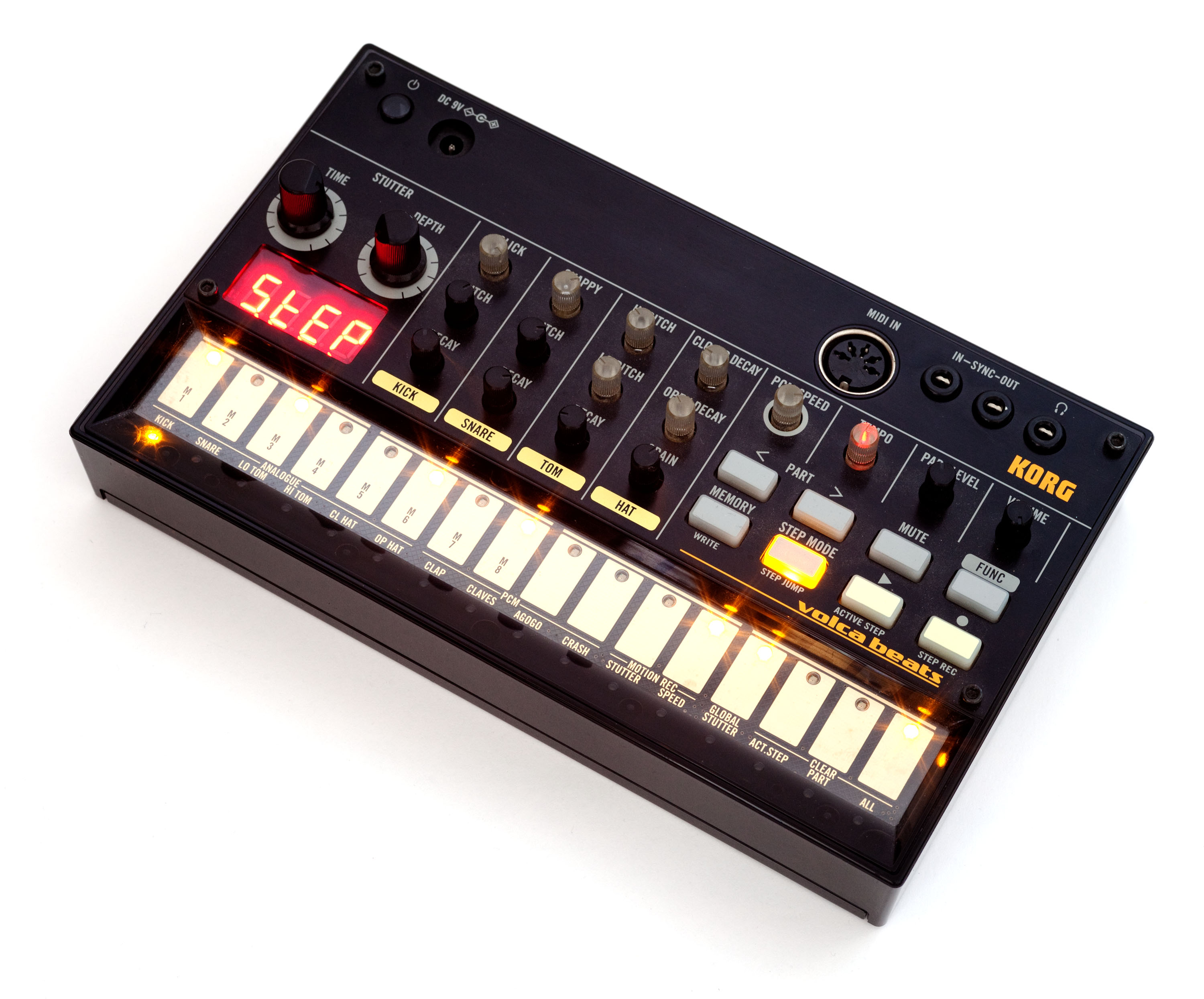
Drum machine ("Manila Dreams")

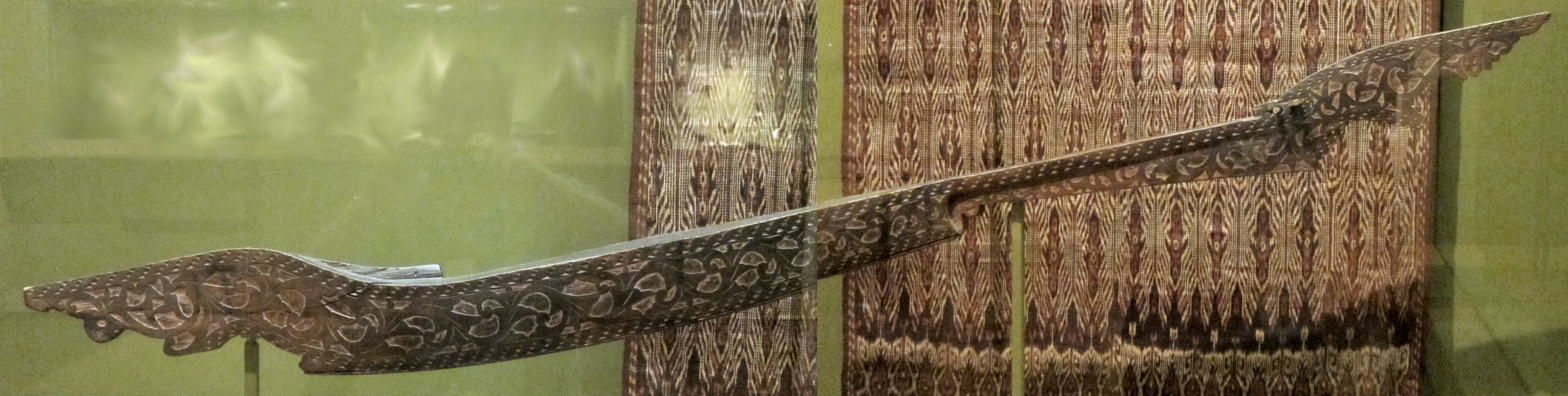
kudyapi ("Day and Night")

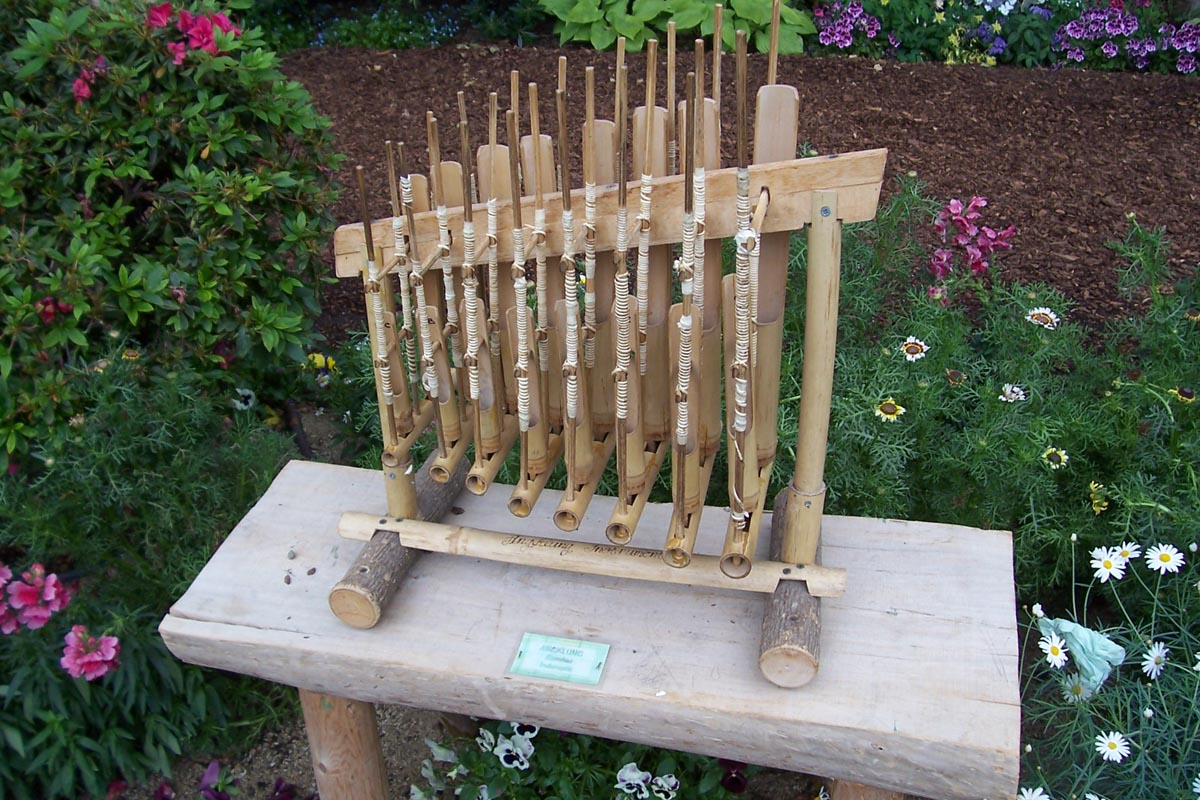
angklung ("Day and Night")

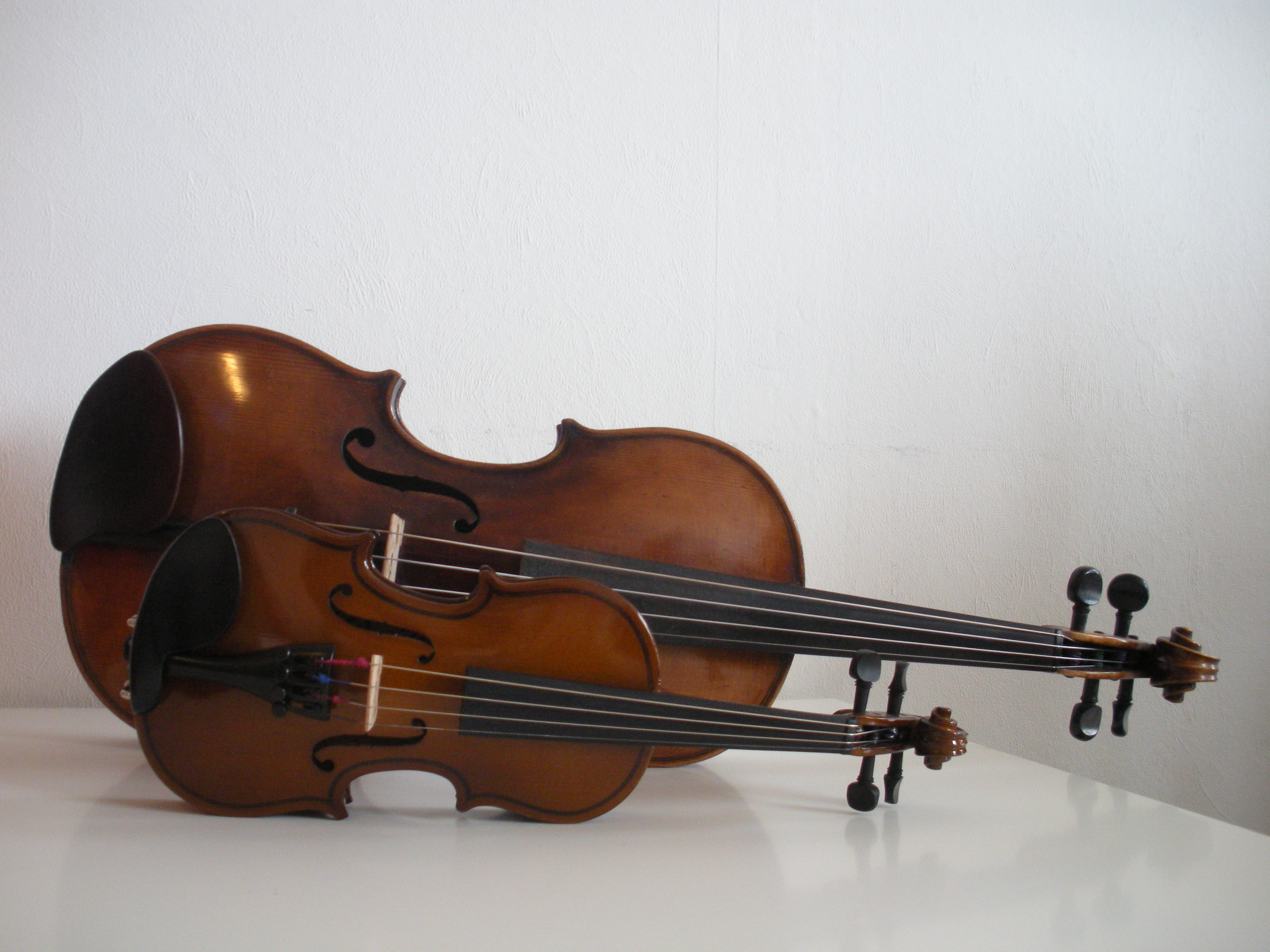
Violin ("Multo")

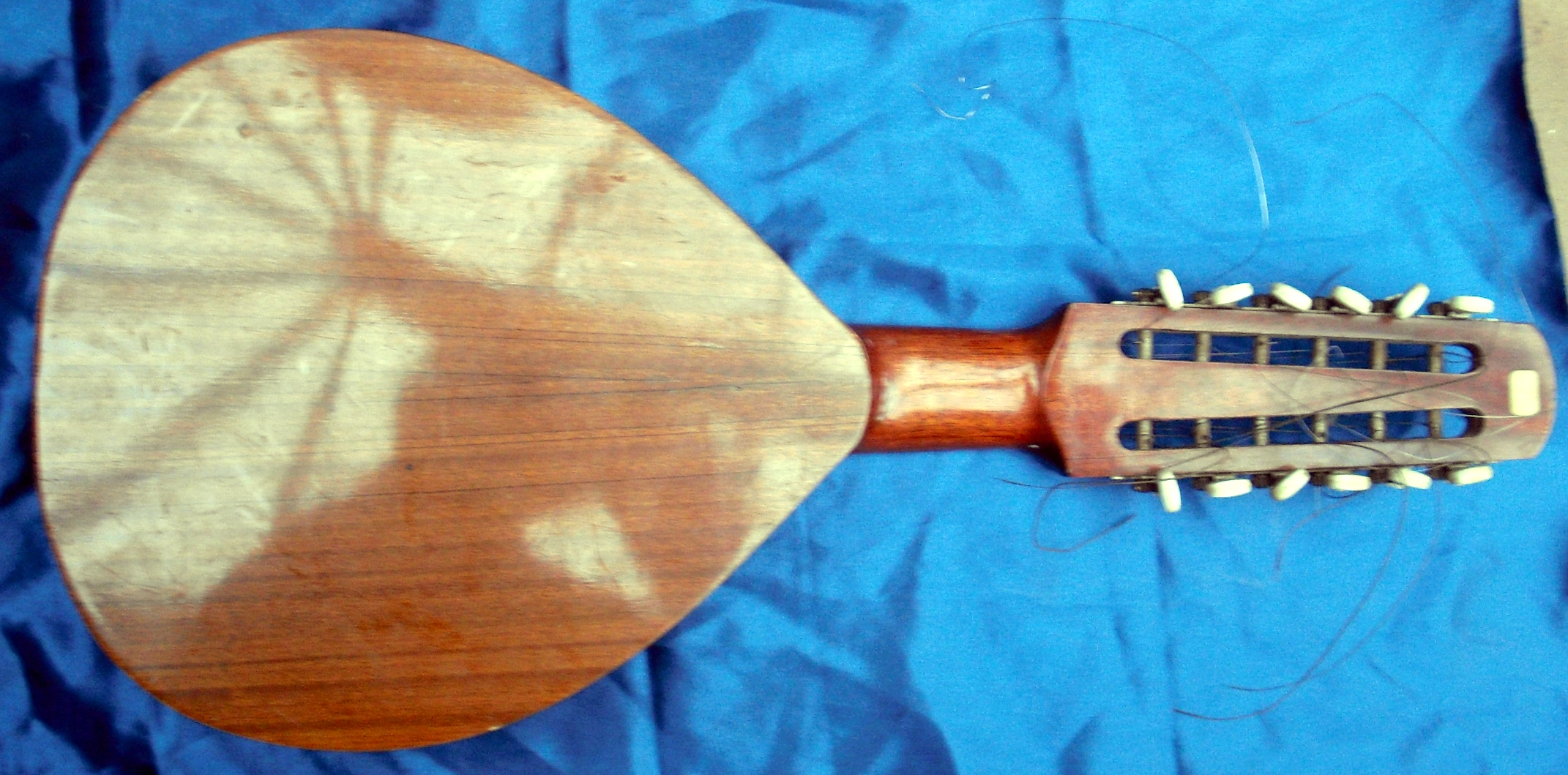
bandurria ("Walang Hanggan")

Isapuso encompasses a variety of musical genres and Philippine languages. "Dagundong", the album's opening track, is a hip-hop song that heavily incorporates bass and rap. Its choreography has a mix of krumping, the Philippine martial art sikaran, and idaw, an Igorot battle dance. The song narrates the Philippines' struggle against imperialism throughout history, from the Spanish occupation to the United States of America's benevolent assimilation of the country. The second track, "Dayang" (transl. Princess), is a mellow pop song featuring a mix of Tausūg and Tagalog lyrics. It is about finding love again after experiencing heartbreak. To honor the song's Tausūg essence, the choreography for "Dayang" incorporates dances and martial arts that are native to or commonly practiced in Mindanao, such as the pangasik (the male equivalent of the pangalay dance), kuntaw, silat, and tariray.

The third track, "Noli", is an R&B song with a stop-and-start rhythm, a relaxed tempo, and guitar riffs; its lyrics draw inspiration from the romance between Maria Clara and Crisostomo Ibarra in José Rizal's classic novel Noli Me Tángere. "Manila Dreams", the fourth track, is about people from the provinces pursuing their dreams in Manila, containing elements of retro disco, funk, and city pop. It uses programmed drums and features lyrics in Cebuano, (Note: also known by its endonym, "Bisaya") Waray, Ilocano, Kapampangan, and Bicolano. Most of the Alamat members, except for Mo and Jao, contributed lyrics to the song.

The fifth track, "Day and Night", is a tropical-themed dance-pop song about a summer crush. In an interview with the American teen magazine Sweety High, Alamat member Taneo shared, "For 'Day and Night', we wanted to capture that feeling you get when you start getting that butterfly, fuzzy feeling and have that summery crush." "Day and Night" tells the story of a fisherman who forms a connection with a magindara, a mermaid-like sea deity in Bicolano and Visayan mythology. Its lyrics heavily use Cebuano and were co-written by Therese Langit, a famous Visayan pop songwriter. The song incorporates traditional Southeast Asian instruments, such as the kudyapi, the two-stringed Philippine boat-lute, and the angklung and bamblong, types of bamboo-based idiophones found across the Southeast Asian region. The "Woohoo!" in the chorus was intended to evoke the mesmerizing voice of the magindara. Alamat member Jao created the song's choreography, incorporating dances from Davao and Bicol.

"Multo" (transl. Ghost), the sixth track, is about falling in love with someone who engages in "ghosting"; layers of violin and bass add a macabre touch to the song. The seventh track on the album, "Walang Hanggan" (transl. No End), is a mid-tempo pop ballad about trying to save a romantic relationship, with lyrics in Tagalog. It incorporates the bandurria in its instrumentals. Isapuso's closing track, "Dong-Dong-Ay", (Note: a melodic phrase with no meaning) is an acoustic rendition of a Kalinga folk song, aimed towards the Filipino youth.

== Release and artwork ==
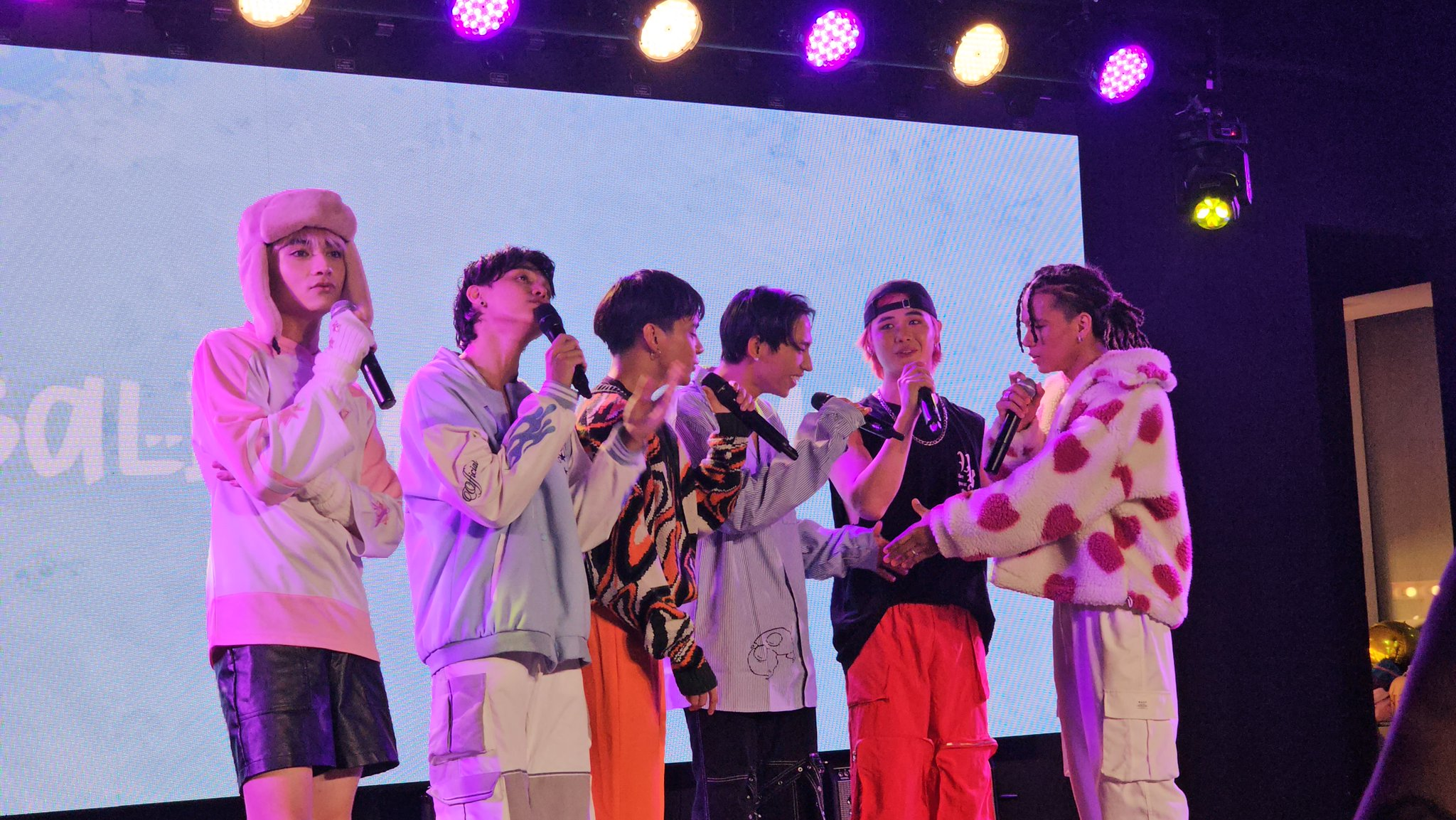
Alamat performing "Dong-Dong-Ay" in December 2023

On June 14, 2023, Alamat released Isapuso's first pre-release single, "Day and Night". Cielo Meneses of The Beat Manila reported that the song "undeniably" became one of P-pop's standout summer hits, noting that it quickly amassed more than 800,000 streams on Spotify. In its music video, Filipino actress Jane de Leon portrays a mermaid-like magindara who charms the members of Alamat, with both de Leon and the members wearing sustainable indigenous Philippine textiles and items, such as Tboli brass accessories sourced from the Department of Science and Technology (DOST)'s Philippine Textile Research Institute.

Following their album announcement at the PPOPCON in July, the group released "Walang Hanggan" as the next pre-release single. The music video shows the members going through loss, heartbreak, and other personal or social challenges. They later posted a series of colorful teasers for the album, which featured illustrations of various things found in Filipino culture, such as the Rizal Monument. The music video for the album's lead single "Dagundong", containing both lyrical and visual references to the Philippine struggle against injustice and oppression, as well as the full Isapuso album, were both released on November 3.

To promote Isapuso, Alamat performed on Rappler Live Jam on November 11, their second appearance on the news publication's music show that year. On December 31, Rappler reported that both of the group's performances in 2023 were among the year's most-viewed Live Jam performances. This also made them the fastest musical act to return to Live Jam and the only P-pop group to perform twice on the show within the same year. In March 2024, the group released a music video for "Dayang" starring Kyosu Guinto and Jaja Disuangco, who had previously gone viral for their participation on the It's Showtime segment EXpecially For You. It came with a single album, containing two new versions of "Dayang" (acoustic and R&B). All three versions of "Dayang" simultaneously occupied the top three spots on iTunes Philippines, and the song peaked at number two on Indonesia's version of the chart.

"Dagundong" was the official theme song of the 2023 superhero film Penduko. In 2024, the Viva One romantic comedy series Chasing in the Wild featured "Day and Night" on its soundtrack.

== Critical reception ==
Professional ratings
Review scores
Source	Rating
Rappler	3.5/5 stars

Isapuso received highly favorable reviews from critics, as recognized by CNN Philippines ("the multilingual and multi-ethnic boy band excels in incorporating regional culture with modern hip-hop, electronic, and pop sensibilities as showcased on their critically acclaimed debut album, Isapuso").

Joey Dizon of Rappler gave the album 3.5 out of 5 stars. In his review, he described Isapuso as a stronger, more focused release than Pasulong. In his opinion, some of the tracks offered "nothing new[...] sound-wise", such as "Day and Night", the chorus of which reminded him of NSYNC. However, he noted that even when the songs on Isapuso treaded familiar territory, they were still well-executed. Dizon called "Noli"'s cadence "infectious" and praised "Walang Hanggan" in particular, lauding its "inventive" production and lyrics. He said that the song's melodies and chord structure boasted "sophistication" rarely seen in P-pop. Dizon concluded that the album broadened P-pop's appeal, indicating Alamat's potential to break the mold and capture the attention of listeners who are not fans of the genre.

On the other hand, Kurt Alec Mira criticized "Walang Hanggan" for being "formulaic" in his album review, published by Tomasino Web. Mira added that it fell short of its potential emotional depth, unlike "Sa Panaginip Na Lang" (transl. Only In Dreams), another melancholic ballad that the group had previously released. He found "Day and Night" to be "dazzling" and commended its blend of pop and poetry. He also praised Mo, Tomas, and R-Ji's melismatic vocals in "Dayang", which he regarded as a sequel to "Maharani", deemed "Manila Dreams" effortlessly delightful, and called the simplicity of the final song, "Dong-Dong-Ay", charming. His review of Isapuso was overall favorable, declaring that "all of the tracks flow logically". Mira concluded that the album was cohesive while being musically diverse.

Joshua Gerona, writing for Republic Asia, and Nica Glorioso, writing for Nylon Manila, both regarded "Walang Hanggan" as a showcase for the members' vocal abilities. Acer Batislaong praised "Day and Night" in a separate feature for Nylon Manila. He wrote that it "embraces the beauty of the Cebuano language", adding that the use of Cebuano provided "an extra touch of romance and allure to the song".

Ratziel San Juan of Billboard Philippines wrote that Alamat perfectly embodied their historical concept with "Dagundong"; the track placed in the publication's "The Top 25 Songs of 2023" list. CNN Philippines included "Dayang" in their "24 best Filipino songs of 2023" list, with writer Ian Urrutia hailing the track as "pop perfection" and "a distillation of everything sonically exciting about P-pop in 2023". The team of One Music Philippines included almost all of the Isapuso tracks, except for "Multo", in their top ten ranking of Alamat's discography, ranging from "Manila Dreams" at number ten to "Day and Night" at number three.

== Accolades ==
Year	Organization	Category	Nominated work	Result	Ref.
2024	P-pop Music Awards	Album of the Year	Isapuso	Nominated	

== Track listing ==
Credits are adapted from Tidal.

No.	Title	Writer(s)	Length
1.	"Dagundong"	Thyro Alfaro	2:30
2.	"Dayang"	Sean Cedro	3:51
3.	"Noli"	Mo Mitchell	2:51
4.	"Manila Dreams"	Johan Gusaffson, Hugo Andersson, Teodor Dahlbom, Jason Paul Laxamana, Alas Alvarez, R-Ji Lim, Taneo Uyam, Tomas Rodriguez	3:38
5.	"Day and Night"	Thyro Alfaro, Therese Langit	3:24
6.	"Multo (feat. Cursebox)"	Blvckroom	3:31
7.	"Walang Hanggan"	Sean Cedro	3:35
8.	"Dong-Dong-Ay"	Sean Cedro	2:52
Total length:			26:15

== Personnel ==
Credits are adapted from Tidal and music videos. (Note: Attributed to multiple sources:)

- Alamat – vocals (all tracks)
  - Alas Alvarez – producing (3), mixing (3, 8), mastering (3, 8), musical arranging (3)
  - Mo Mitchell – vocal arranging (3)
  - R-Ji Lim – producing (3)
- Thyro Alfaro – composing (1, 2, 5), producing (1, 2, 5), mixing (1, 2, 7), musical arranging (2, 5), recording (1, 2, 5)
- Blvckroom – composing (6)
- Sean Cedro – composing (2, 7, 8), producing (1), mixing (2)
- Cursebox (Michael Negapatan) – producing (1, 6), musical arranging (6), mixing (6), mastering (6)
- Jan Fuertez – mastering (1, 2, 5, 7)
- Martin Andrew Guevara – recording (1, 2, 5)
- The Kennel AB (Hugo Andersson, Teodor Dahlbom, Johan Gusaffson) – composing (4)
  - Teodor Dahlbom – musical arranging (4), mastering (4)
  - Johan Gustaffson – producing (4), musical arranging (4), mixing (4), mastering (4)
- Therese Langit – composing (5)
- Jason Paul Laxamana – producing (7, 8)
- Paulo Protacio – musical arranging (7, 8)
- Zebedee Zuñiga – vocal arranging (4, 5, 6, 7, 8)
