= 1st.One =

Filipino boy band

1st One
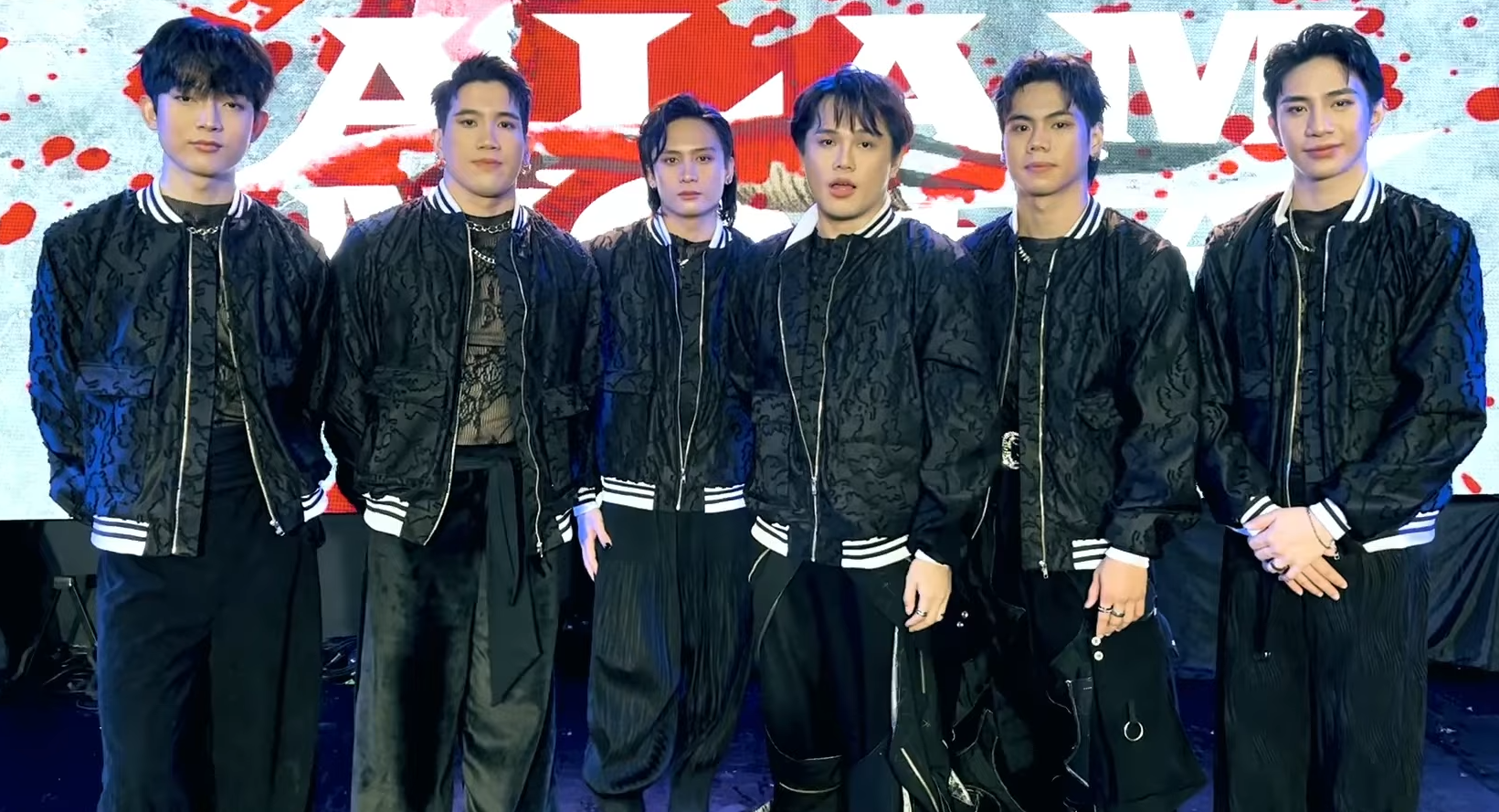
- 1st.One in 2025

Background information
- Also known as: First One; 1st.One
- Origin: Manila, Philippines
- Genres: P-pop; pop; hip hop; R&B; EDM
- Years active: 2020–present
- Labels: 1st.One Entertainment; Warner Music Philippines
- Members: Ace; Max; Alpha; J; Joker; Jayson
- Website: firstone-ent.com

1st One (stylized as 1st.One) is a Filipino boy band formed and trained by management company 1st.One Entertainment. It consists of 6 members: Ace, Max, Alpha, J, Joker, and Jayson. The group debuted on July 31, 2020 with their single "You Are the One (Ttak Maja Nuh)".

== Name ==
The name FirstOne was taken from the name of their entertainment, FirstOne's Company in South Korea.

=== 2015–2019 member search ===
The group members were trained individually for three years before they debuted and launched as 1st One. The leader of 1st One, Ace, was a singer in the Philippines before he turned out to be part of the group. Ace had been part and the representative of the KBS Kpop World Festival in 2015. Under his real name, he released a song "Blow the Night Away", and it was followed by "Ikaw Pa Rin" and "Giliw" through Star Music.

The last member that joined the group was Jayson. He trained for 2 years. Ace, Alpha, Max, and Joker were part of the group "VJBros", a dance cover group that performed at the 28th Philippine-Korea Cultural Exchange Festival on September 28, 2019.

On November 10, 2019, they were the grand winners at Seoul Music Awards Philippines, "Dance To Your Seoul" dance battle.

=== 2020–2021: Debut ===
Shortly before their initial debut on July 31, 2020, 1st One performed at the 29th Seoul Music Awards with several well-known K-pop artists such as Taeyeon, Red Velvet, NCT, Twice, Monsta X, and many others. 1st One made history by being the first Filipino boy group to perform at the Seoul Music Awards in South Korea. They worked with Korean songwriters and producer for their debut song which is "You Are The One (Ttak Maja Nuh)". Docskim, a producer who worked with Big Hit Entertainment for BTS' songs, helped create their debut song. Shin Minchu, a composer who is known for his song "Paradise" and was used on a Korean drama series "Boys Over Flower" and a former member of the group, T-Max. And Ryu.D, a choreographer, worked with big groups from South Korea like NCT127, BTS, EXO, StrayKids, and NU'EST.

Debuted on July 31, 2020, with their single "You Are The One (Ttak Maja Nuh)" reached almost 900,000 views on YouTube.

In 2021, planned to have a project World Tour Concert 'Kpop x Ppop Showcase' along with other K-Pop groups that are managed and handled by FirstOne Entertainment.

On August 31, 2021 the group released their second single for their official comeback. In this single, Gift appeared as the seventh and special member of the group.

=== 2022: Official comeback, PPOPCON, Tugatog ===
On the evening of December 31, it was announced that the group would make their official comeback in January 2022, after a year of waiting for their official comeback.

On January 15, they officially released their third single and comeback single "Shout Out", the single was written by one of their members, Ace, and was composed and arranged by Great Brothers and Ragoon.

On March 31, the group signed a contract with Warner Music Philippines as the distributor of their albums and songs. In a statement, Firstone Entertainment said that it has partnered with Warner Music Philippines to manage the rising P-pop boy group.

On April 10, the group performed at 2022 PPOPCON as the main performer, with special member, Gift as the seventh member of the group at the Araneta City.

On April 12, it was announced that 1st One will perform in SM Mall of Asia at the 2022 Tugatog Music Festival to be held on July 15, 2022 with idol groups MNL48, Alamat, BINI, BGYO, LITZ, Ppop Generation, Press Hit Play, and VXON as the first batch announced.

On August 26, 1st One released its road-to-comeback single "Turn Up". The group was all involved in the creative process of the track. Ace, the group leader, wrote the lyrics, and Max, one of the main vocalists, did the lyrics proofing. The other members co-wrote the rap parts.

""Turn Up" has a catchy dance vibe, but the message of positivity stays with you. "Everyone will go through failing in life, but if you continue to stand up and not give up, all your troubles will eventually turn upside down and turn up for the better. Failing only happens when you give up. Standing up gives you infinite chances to succeed and overcome all your challenges in life,"

— ACE

November 29, the group pop-rock single "Shout Out," debuted at the 13th spot on the Billboard Hot Trending Song (HTS). Before the day ended, "Shout Out" received the number 1 spot on the 24-hour, real-time ranking. This triumph makes 1st One the second Filipino act to enter Billboard's HTS chart. 1st One now joins the P-Pop supergroup SB19 on the milestone, the first artist to invade the international music tabulation.

== Artistry ==
=== Influences ===
The group admires singers such as Michael Jackson, Gary Valenciano, Backstreet Boys, and NSYNC.

"Actually, other boy groups have their own goals and ways that make them unique. We focus more on how we can improve and grow within ourselves because, at the end of the day, our ultimate rival is ourselves. We seek to always be better than ourselves from yesterday. We're sure that the fire within our hearts, minds, and souls that keeps us dreaming and reaching for our goals is one of the strongest forces of being artists that others will ever get to see. We all have this motto that the perfect way to succeed and FLY is by keeping our feet on the ground while having our eyes on the sky. It is an endless devotion and journey for us. What makes us unique is the intensity of the fire within us."

— 1st One

== Members ==
Current

- Ace – leader and main vocalist
- Max – main vocalist
- Alpha – main rapper
- Joker – lead vocalist
- J - lead rapper
- Jayson - sub-rapper

Special

- Gift

== Discography ==
=== Singles ===
List of singles, showing year released and album name
Title	Year	Album
"Ttak Maja Nuh"	2020	Non-album singles
"Oh"	2021	Non-album singles
"Shout Out"	2022	Non-album singles
"Turn Up"	2022	Non-album singles
"Dahil Sa Mahal Kita" (Thousand Years of Love)	2022	Non-album singles
"Problem Child"	2023	Non-album singles
"Oras"	2023	Non-album singles
"Your Love"	2023	Non-album singles
"Dito"	2023	Non-album singles
"Paalam Na"	2024	Non-album singles
"Wala Ng Iba"	2024	Non-album singles
"Alam Mo Ba"	2025	Non-album singles
"MYV (Map Your Vibe)"	2025	Non-album singles
"Gusto Mo Ba"(featuring jikamarie)	2025	Non-album singles
"Kung Saan Saan"	2026	Non-album singles

=== Promotional singles ===
List of promotional singles, showing year released and album name
Title	Year	Album
"One Dream"	2020	Non-album single
"Hold On"	2020	Non-album single

== Filmography ==
=== Music videos ===
Title	Year	Ref.
"One Dream"	2020	
"Ttak Maja Nuh"	2020	
"Hold On"	2020	
"Oh"	2021	
"Shout Out"	2022	
"Turn Up"	2022	
"Dahil Sa Mahal Kita" (Thousand Years of Love)	2022	
"Problem Child"	2023	
"Dito"	2024	
"Paalam Na"	2024	
"Gusto Mo Ba"(featuring jikamarie)	2025	
"Kung Saan Saan"	2026	

=== Television ===
Year	Month/Date	Program	Ref.
2020	August 17	KMJS	
2020	August 19	Wish	
2020	August 19	GMA Unang Hirit	
2020	October 27	GMA All-Out Sunday	
2020	November 16	GMA Unang Hirit	
2024	November 6	It's Showtime	

== Awards and nominations ==
Award	Year (Note: Indicates the year of ceremony. Each year is linked to the article about the awards held that year, wherever possible.)	Category (Note: Awards in certain categories do not have prior nominations and only winners are announced by the jury. For simplification and to avoid errors, each award in this list has been presumed to have had a prior nomination.)	Recipient(s) and nominee(s)	Result	Ref.
89.5 Star FM Baguio Best of 2020	2020	P-Pop Group of the Year	1ST.ONE	Nominated	
Awit Awards	2022	Favorite Group Artist	1ST.ONE	Nominated	
PPOP Awards	2022	P-pop Boy Group of the Year	1ST.ONE	Nominated	
PPOP Awards	2022	Live Performance of the Year	1ST.ONE	Won	
PPOP Awards	2022	Music Video of the Year	"Shout Out"	Won	
P-Pop Best Chart Awards	2021	P-Pop Group of the Year	1ST.ONE	Won	
