= Kbye =

- Official single cover

Single by Alamat
- Language: Bicolano; Cebuano; Hiligaynon; Ilocano; Kapampangan; Tagalog; Waray
- Released: February 15, 2021
- Studio: Viva Recording Studios
- Genre: Hip-hop; R&B; pop
- Length: 3:34
- Label: Viva
- Songwriters: Alamat; Jason Paul Laxamana
- Composer: Alamat
- Producer: Civ Fontanilla

Alamat singles chronology
"Kbye" (2021)	"Sandigan" (2021)

Music video
- "Kbye" on YouTube

"Kbye" (stylized in all lowercase) is the debut single by the Filipino boy band Alamat. Released on February 15, 2021, by Viva Records, it blends hip-hop, R&B, and pop, and also incorporates traditional Philippine instruments such as the kulintang, along with audio samples of bamboo poles striking the floor in a tinikling performance. Written by Alamat during a jam session and produced by Civ Fontanilla, the song's lyrics portray the perspective of someone who has been ghosted by their significant other. The group's creative director, Jason Paul Laxamana, is also credited as a songwriter.

"Kbye" and its music video received mostly favorable reviews from music critics. Hans Carbonilla of the Philippine Daily Inquirer described the song as "groundbreaking". Three weeks after its release, "Kbye" entered Billboard's Next Big Sound chart, peaking at number two. Various publications reported that this made Alamat the fastest Filipino act to enter the global chart.

== Background and release ==
In May 2020, Viva Records and its subsidiary label, Ninuno Media, held auditions for a multilingual P-pop boy group. According to the group's creative director Jason Paul Laxamana, he and his team sought members who were not just talented, but also proficient in different Philippine languages. The group became known as Alamat (transl. Legend). In November, the group's nine members and their code names were revealed to the public.

They released covers of various songs, including a multilingual version of "Wala Na Bang Pag-Ibig" (transl. Is There No Love Anymore) by Jaya in January 2021. Alamat later debuted with the song "Kbye". Its music video premiered on YouTube on February 14, 2021, while the song itself was released on all digital streaming platforms on February 15.

== Composition and lyrics ==
"Kbye" is three minutes and thirty-four seconds long. Musically, it blends hip-hop, R&B, and pop. It incorporates traditional Philippine instruments, such as the kulintang and bandurria, and audio samples like the sounds produced by the tapping of bamboo poles on the floor in a tinikling performance. According to Alamat member Mo, the group wrote the lyrics during a spontaneous jam session after coming up with its melody and flow. Jason Paul Laxamana is also credited for writing the lyrics. Civ Fontanilla produced the song, while Iean Iñigo arranged it. Joel Mendoza recorded "Kbye" at Viva Recording Studios; he also mixed and mastered the song. Jazz Carilla of Parcinq, a Filipino magazine, noted that the song's "very upbeat" melody contrasts with its lyrics.

"Kbye"
A 19-second sample of "Kbye", where the multilingual chorus can be heard.

Lyrically, "Kbye" is from the perspective of a person who was ghosted by their significant other. Throughout the song, the narrator expresses different emotions about the failed relationship, from disappointment to nostalgia. A few critics have also identified a resentful tone in the lyrics. The song features a total of seven Philippine languages: Bicolano, Cebuano, Hiligaynon, Ilocano, Kapampangan, Tagalog, and Waray. In an interview with the Philippine Daily Inquirer, then-member Valfer said of the multilingual lyrics, "Not everyone understands Korean, but we still appreciate their music and they were still able to promote their culture. So even though we sing in different languages, I believe that the beauty of culture will still shine through."

== Reception ==
"Kbye" received favorable reviews from most music critics. Writing for the Philippine Daily Inquirer, Hans Carbonilla described the song as "groundbreaking". He lauded the track for showing that "tradition can thrive alongside modernity". Vice News's Lia Savillo considered the lyrics to be "utterly relatable" and noted that the song "seamlessly" integrated Filipino culture into its hip-hop sound. Likewise, Republic Asia's Joshua Gerona praised the song for capturing "the universality of heartbreak and of being ghosted", as well as blending traditional Philippine music with hip-hop. Canilla wrote that "Kbye"'s use of seven Philippine languages stopped it from being a typical song about love problems.

Nica Glorioso of Nylon Manila wrote that the song offered a preview of Alamat's "endless" possibilities as a group, despite its bitter lyrics. Writing for the Filipino magazine Grid, Billy Caluag questioned the song's authenticity. He said, "As I listened to 'Kbye' over and over again, I couldn't help but wonder if P-pop was truly ours: while these nine Filipinos were clothed in our fragmented culture and sang in their culturally personal ways, their direction is guided by the K-pop industry." Although his girlfriend, Sam, argued that Alamat was both a product of K-pop's influence and something that Filipinos could call their own, Caluag stated that concerns of cultural appropriation and "capitalist exploitation" continued to perturb him. The Manila Bulletin's Punch Liwanag criticized the song's seriousness, remarking that the more cheerful tone of Alamat's 2022 song "ABKD" suited the group more. Nonetheless, he recognized "Kbye" as an "excellent R&B-imbued excursion".

The music video entered YouTube's top trending list at number 23 on February 18, 2021. Within three weeks of its release, "Kbye" debuted on Billboard's Next Big Sound chart, peaking at number two. Multiple Philippine publications, such as Philstar, Rappler, and Nylon Manila, reported that this made Alamat the fastest Filipino act to enter the global chart.

== Music video ==
The music video for "Kbye" starts with the members sitting on top of or leaning on a jeepney. They later dance while wearing clothes inspired by each of their respective cultures. Their choreography incorporates moves from traditional Philippine dances like the maglalatik, which involves dancers tapping on coconut shells attached to their bodies. The video contains various other references to Filipino culture. In some scenes, they dance in front of a neon sign written in baybayin. Bunting, salakot (cone-shaped hat), colorful capiz shell windows, and samalamig (sweet beverage containing jelly) can be also seen in the video. Philstar's Kathleen A. Llemit noted that the members' hair was dyed in bright colors, which she considered interesting.

The Philippine Daily Inquirer's Allan Policarpio described the video as "high-octane". Writing for the newspaper's US bureau, Hans Carbonilla praised the video for giving its traditional cultural elements "a fresh and contemporary twist". Llemit commended Alamat for "basically screaming[...] that they are proudly Filipino" through the video. Actress and singer Lea Salonga called the video "fabulous" on Twitter.

== Credits and personnel ==
Credits are adapted from a video description published by Viva Records' official YouTube channel.

- Alamat – vocals, lyrics, composition
- Civ Fontanilla – production
- Iean Iñigo – arranging
- Jason Paul Laxamana – lyrics
- Joel Mendoza – mixing, mastering, recording
