= Tomas Rodriguez (actor) =

Filipino actor and singer (born 1998)

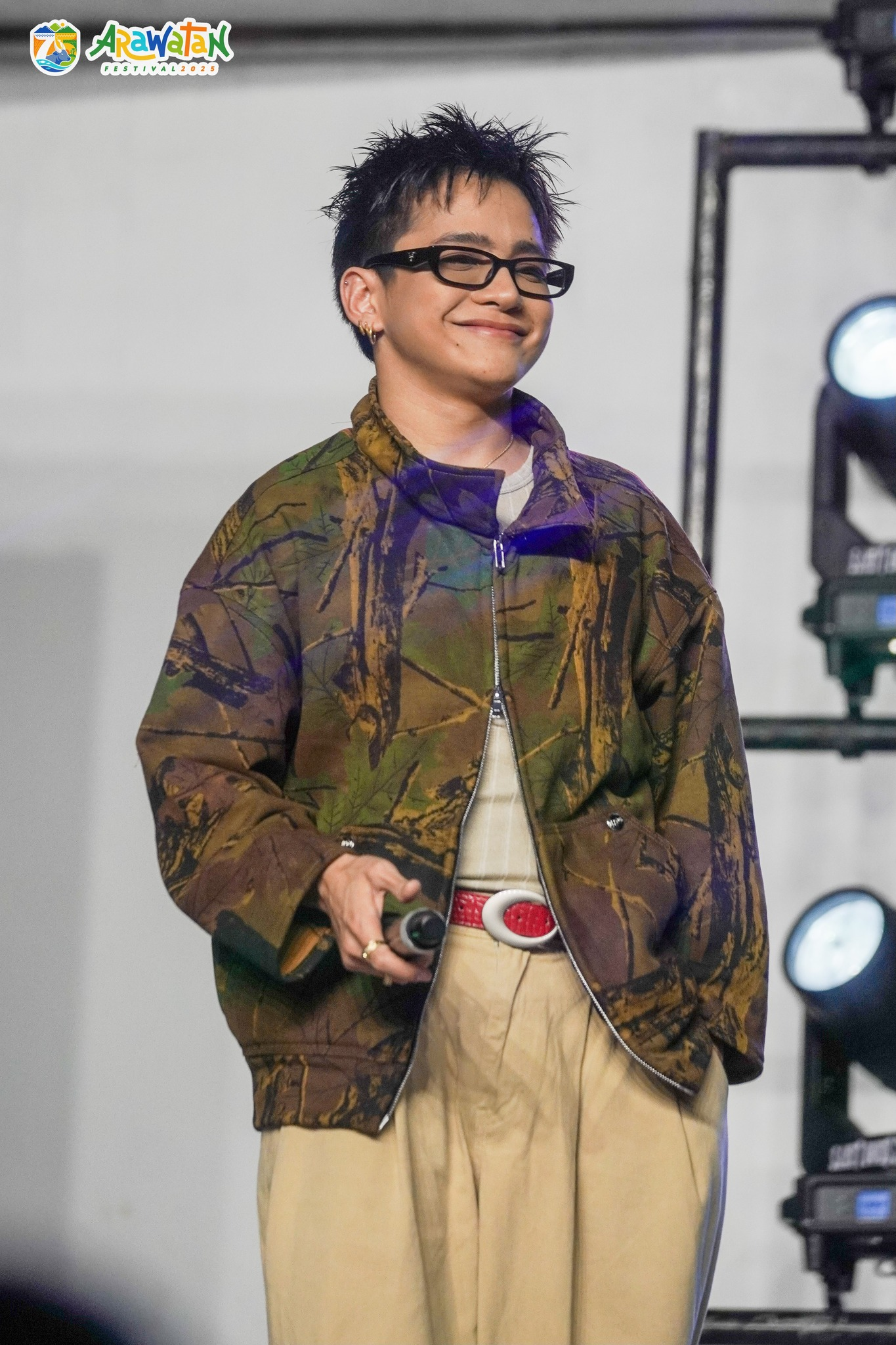
- Rodriguez in November 2025
- Born: Thomas Franco Rodriguez; June 27, 1998 (age 28); Tabaco, Albay, Philippines
- Occupations: Actor; singer
- Years active: 2015–present
- Musical career
- Label: Viva
- Member of: Alamat

Thomas Franco Rodriguez (born June 27, 1998), known by his stage name Tomas (sometimes spelled as Tomás) and professionally credited as Tomas Rodriguez, is a Filipino actor and singer. In 2015, he joined the reality competition show Pinoy Big Brother, ending as its 3rd Big Placer (3rd-ranked finalist). He had bit roles in some television series from 2016 to 2018. On February 14, 2021, he debuted as a member of the multilingual Filipino boy band Alamat, where he represents his language Bicolano. In 2023, he portrayed Caloy in the romantic comedy film Girlfriend Na, Pwede Na and Nestor in The Ship Show. In 2025, he was cast as Gilbert, a role originally portrayed by Herbert Bautista, in Bagets: The Musical, a theater adaptation of the 1984 Filipino coming-of-age film Bagets (transl. Teens).

== Early life and education ==
Thomas Franco Rodriguez was born on June 27, 1998 in Tabaco, Albay, Philippines.

== Career ==
=== Beginnings: Pinoy Big Brother ===
On June 21, 2015, Rodriguez joined the sixth season of the reality competition show Pinoy Big Brother, which was titled Pinoy Big Brother: 737. He was introduced as "Franco Rodriguez" at the time, with the nickname "Totoy Smiley ng Albay" (transl. Smiley Boy of Albay). In November, he completed his stint on the show as the season's 3rd Big Placer (3rd-ranked finalist). From 2016 to 2018, he had uncredited bit roles in shows like Wildflower and Maalaala Mo Kaya (transl. Would You Remember).

=== 2021-present: Alamat debut, career expansion ===
On February 14, 2021, Rodriguez debuted in the Filipino boy band Alamat (transl. Legend). The group earned significant media attention for their concept of singing in multiple Philippine languages, with Rodriguez representing Bicolano. In 2022, he appeared in the romance film Expensive Candy. He portrayed Caloy in Girlfriend Na, Pwede Na (transl. Girlfriend, That's Good Enough), which began showing in Philippine theaters on January 18, 2023.

Later in 2023, he was cast as Nestor in the romantic comedy film The Ship Show, starring Heaven Peralejo and Marco Gallo. The film was released in theaters on August 9. In December, he won Top Male Visual of the Year at the 8th P-pop Awards. In September 2025, he was cast as Gilbert in Bagets: The Musical, a theater adaptation of the 1984 Filipino coming-of-age film Bagets (transl. Teens). The role was originally portrayed by Herbert Bautista.

== Filmography ==
=== Television ===
Tomas Rodriguez' television credits with year of release, film titles and roles
Year	Title	Role	Ref.
2015	Pinoy Big Brother: 737	Himself	
2017	Wildflower	Unnamed (bit part)	
2016-2018	Maalaala Mo Kaya	Unnamed (bit part); Kalipha	
2023	Kurdapya	--	
2023	For The Love	Gene (in the Anghel episode)	

=== Film ===
Tomas Rodriguez' film credits with year of release, film titles and roles
Year	Title	Role	Ref.
2022	Expensive Candy	Unnamed (bit part)	
2023	Girlfriend Na, Pwede Na	Caloy	
2023	The Ship Show	Nestor	

== Theater ==
Year	Title	Role	Note(s)	Ref.
2025	Bagets: The Musical	Gilbert	--	

== Awards and nominations ==
Award	Year	Category	Result	Ref.
8th P-pop Awards	2023	Top Male Visual of the Year	Won	
