= R-Ji Lim =

Filipino actor, model and singer (born 1999)

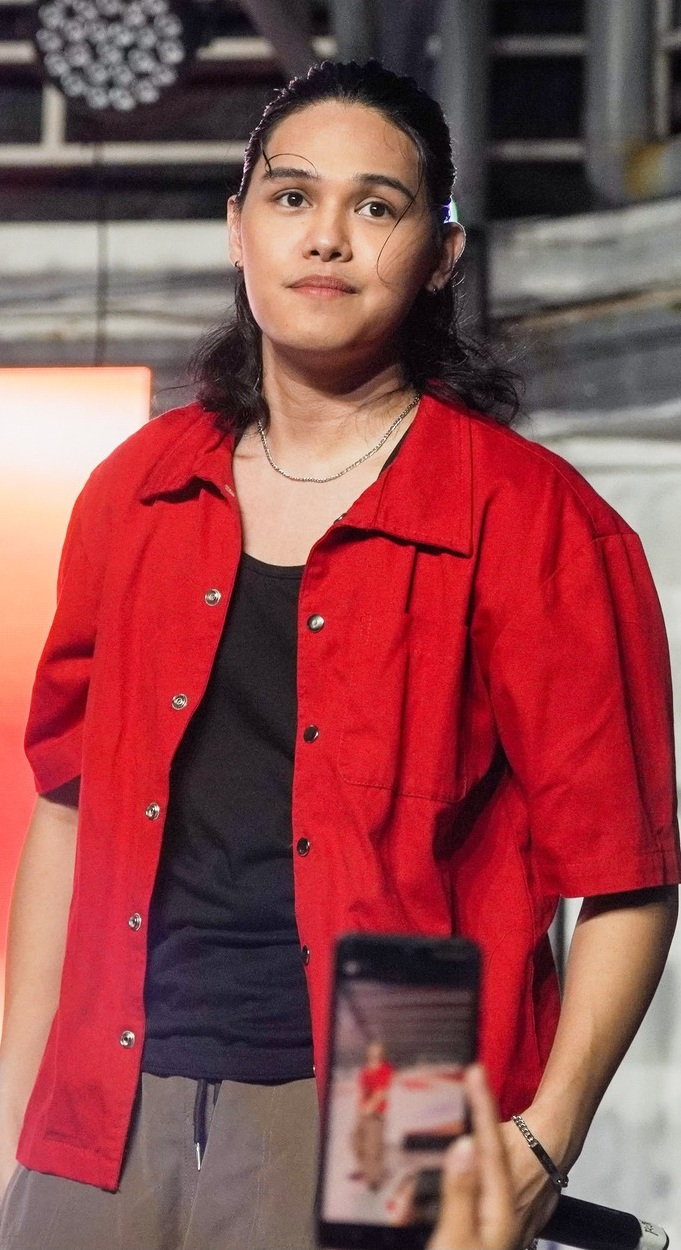
- Lim in November 2025

Background information
- Born: Ralph Joseph Baleña Lim; 8 November 1999 (age 26); Borongan, Eastern Samar, Philippines
- Occupations: Singer; Actor; Model; Dancer
- Years active: 2020–present
- Musical career
- Genres: Pinoy pop; OPM; R&B; Ballad
- Instruments: Vocals; guitar
- Years active: 2020–present
- Labels: Viva Records; Ninuno Media Inc.; Believe Music
- Member of: Alamat

Ralph Joseph Lim (born 8 November 1999), professionally credited as R-Ji Lim or simply R-Ji, is a Filipino singer, actor and model. He is the Waray-Waray representative of the P-pop group, Alamat.

== Early life ==
Lim was born on November 8, 1999, in Borongan, the capital city of the province of Eastern Samar, Philippines. At the age of 9, his father died, leaving his mother, Dolores Baleña-Lim, to financially support him. He studied at Eastern Samar National Comprehensive High School and joined various school pageantry and talent competitions.

He is Roman Catholic and formerly a member of the Neocatechumenal Way.

== Career ==
=== 2020–present: Alamat ===
Lim started his musical career on November 5, 2020, when he was introduced to the public through the Alamat Facebook page as 'Trainee 6' with the codename 'Sangkay' ("Friend" in the Waray-Waray language). On February 14, 2021, after training for nine months, he debuted as an official member of Alamat with the name R-Ji in their debut single "kbye".

The Alamat boy group was formed through PWEDE: The National Boyband Search by VIVA Artists Agency and Ninuno Media. It distinguishes itself as a multilingual and multiethnic boy band that sings in seven Philippine languages: Tagalog, Ilocano, Kapampangan, Cebuano, Hiligaynon, Bikolano, and Waray-Waray.

=== Acting career ===
Lim played Tulabot, a troublemaker student, in the 2022 romantic drama film Expensive Candy. He will portray Jacob Lee, a member of the Roswell Mafia, in the upcoming Filipino romantic comedy series My Husband is a Mafia Boss.

== Awards and nominations ==
Platform	Year	Category	Recipient	Result	Ref.
JuanCast	2025	EveryJuan's P-pop Powerful Vocal Male	R-Ji	Won	
