= Gupit =

- Official single cover

Single by The Juans featuring Alamat
- Language: Tagalog
- English title: Cut
- Released: June 14, 2024
- Genre: Pop rock
- Length: 3:20
- Label: Viva
- Composers: Alas Alvarez; Carl Guevarra; Chael Adriano; Mo Mitchell
- Producers: Japs Mendoza; Thyro Alfaro

The Juans singles chronology
"Napagod Na" (2024)	"Gupit" (2024)	"Rebound" (2024)

Alamat singles chronology
"Dayang" (2024)	"Gupit" (2024)	"Hiraya" (2024)

"Gupit" (lit. 'Cut') is a song recorded by the Filipino pop rock band The Juans. A version featuring the P-pop boy band Alamat was released as a single on June 14, 2024. Another with just the Juans was released on July 5. "Gupit" is a pop rock song about cutting one's hair after the end of a romantic relationship.

== Background and release ==
On April 5, 2024, Filipino pop rock band The Juans released the single "Napagod Na" (transl. Grew Tired). On June 4, the group and the Filipino boy band Alamat announced that they would release a single together called "Gupit" at the former's Juans a Month fan event at the Viva Café in Cubao, Quezon City. The song was released on various streaming platforms on June 14.

== Composition and lyrics ==
The version of "Gupit" featuring Alamat is three minutes and 20 seconds long, while the version with just The Juans is two minutes and 19 seconds long. Musically, it has been described as a pop rock song. The track features rap verses. Currie Castor of Esquire Philippines and Charmie Joy Pagulong of The Philippine Star have observed that it has a more upbeat sound than The Juans' usual songs. The lyrics are about cutting one's hair following a breakup.

== Music video ==
The music video for "Gupit" was released on June 14. It stars Alamat's Jao Canlas as someone who is dealing with a recent breakup. His friends, portrayed by the members of The Juans, encourage him to get a haircut. The other members of Alamat portray the employees of a barber shop, where Canlas' hair gets cut and The Juans' members also get theirs cut in solidarity.

== Live performances ==
The Juans and Alamat performed "Gupit" on It's Showtime on August 26, 2024.

== Personnel ==
Credits are adapted from Tidal.

- Japs Mendoza – production, arrangement
- Thyro Alfaro – production, arrangement
- Alas Alvarez – lyrics, composition
- Carl Guevarra – lyrics, composition
- Chael Adriano – lyrics, composition, arrangement
- Mo Mitchell – lyrics, composition

== Awards and nominations ==
Awards and nominations for "Gupit"
Organization	Year	Category	Result	Ref.
P-pop Awards	2024	Collaboration of the Year	Nominated	
