= Day and Night (Alamat song) =

2023 single by Alamat

Single by Alamat
- Language: Cebuano; English; Tagalog
- Released: June 14, 2023
- Genre: Bubblegum pop; dance pop; dancehall; Visayan pop
- Length: 3:24
- Label: Viva
- Songwriters: Thyro Alfaro; Therese Langit
- Producer: Thyro Alfaro

Alamat singles chronology
"Gayuma" (2023)	"Day and Night" (2023)	"Walang Hanggan" (2023)

Music video
- "Day and Night" on YouTube

"Day and Night" is a song recorded by the Filipino boy group Alamat. It is an upbeat song about a blossoming romance, intended to evoke the summer season. The lyrics use three languages, Cebuano, English, and Tagalog. Therese Langit, a renowned songwriter in the Visayas, and Thyro Alfaro wrote and composed "Day and Night".

Viva Records released the song on June 14, 2023, as the first single from Alamat's second album, Isapuso. Jao, one of the group's main dancers, contributed to the song's choreography. The song went viral on social media on multiple occasions, reaching audiences from within and beyond the Philippines. Alamat performed "Day and Night" at Billboard Philippines' first anniversary celebration in October 2024. The song was included in the soundtrack of the 2024 Philippine romantic comedy series, Chasing in the Wild, produced by Viva One.

== Background and release ==
The Filipino boy group Alamat achieved success with their album Pasulong in 2022, which included tracks such as "Maharani", their most-streamed single so far. Alamat member Jao created the choreography for "Day and Night" with minimal guidance, incorporating regional dances as key elements. Some of the dances featured in the choreography are from Davao and Bicol. In an interview with the American teen magazine Sweety High, Alamat member Taneo said of the song, "For 'Day and Night,' we wanted to capture that feeling you get when you start getting that butterfly, fuzzy feeling and have that summery crush."

On June 14, 2023, the group released "Day and Night", the first single from their then-upcoming album Isapuso. Cielo Meneses of The Beat Manila wrote that the song "undeniably became one of the standout hits of the summer", noting that it quickly accumulated more than 800,000 streams on Spotify. In 2024, the Viva One romantic comedy series Chasing in the Wild featured the song on its soundtrack.

== Composition and lyrics ==
"Day and Night"
An 11-second sample of the song's first chorus. Mo, a main vocalist in the group, sings in a mix of Cebuano and English.

Thyro Alfaro and Therese Langit wrote and composed "Day and Night". Alfaro produced the song. Langit is a famous songwriter in the Visayas region of the Philippines. The lyrics for "Day and Night" are written in three languages, Cebuano, (Note: also known by its endonym, Bisaya) Tagalog, (Note: also known by the designated name Filipino) and English. Lyrically, the song is about a summer crush. The narrator is infatuated with someone they have newly met.

The song incorporates traditional Southeast Asian instruments, such as the kudyapi (Note: This refers to the two-stringed Philippine boat-lute. It is also known as the kutiyapi; both terms originate from the Maguindanao language.) and the angklung and bamblong, types of bamboo-based idiophones found across the Southeast Asian region. Some elements of the song, such as the "Woohoo!" in the chorus, are intended to evoke the mesmerizing voice of Magindara.

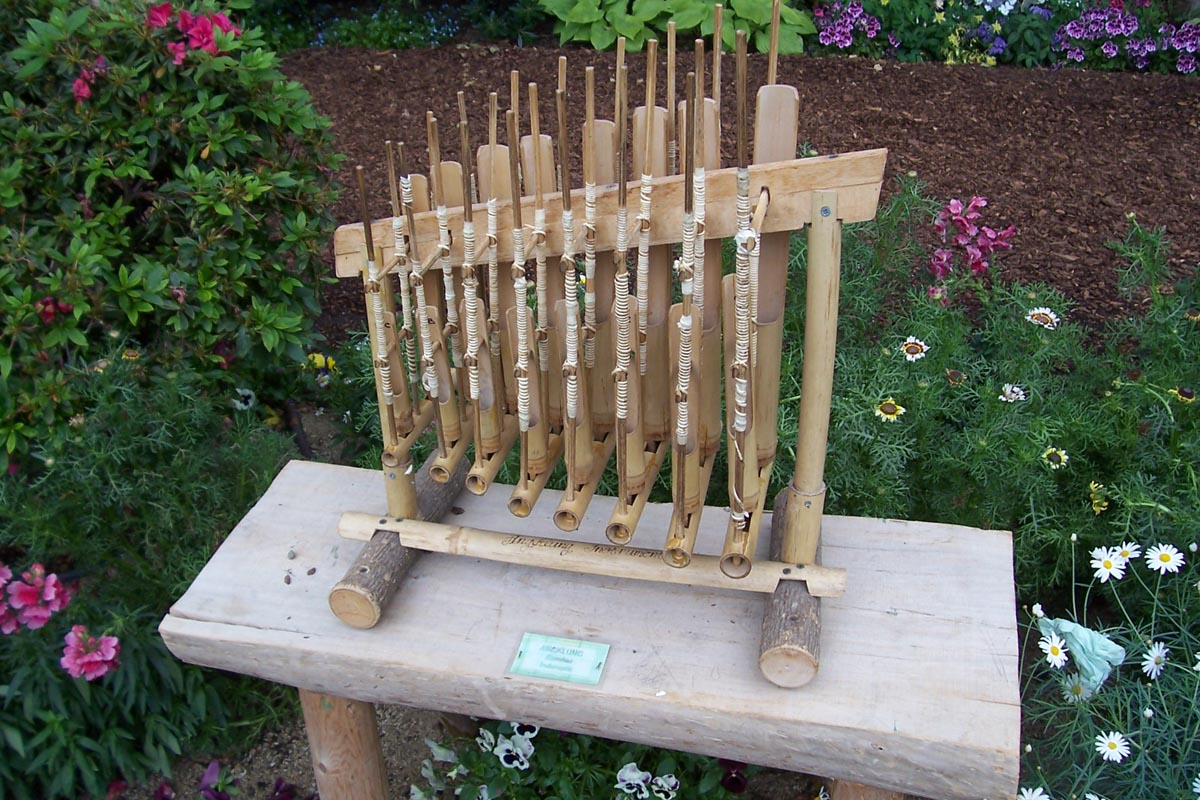
The angklung, a bamboo-based idiophone mainly used in Indonesia, is one of the traditional Southeast Asian instruments used in "Day and Night" by Alamat.

== Reception ==
Sam Ledesma of Adobo Magazine said that the song "can be written off as just another song about kilig-worthy experiences with a summer crush", but the multilingual lyrics, references to folklore, and use of traditional instruments help "Day and Night" stand out. In a track-by-track review of the album Isapuso for Tomasino Web, official student publication of the University of Santo Tomas, Kurt Alec Mira described "Day and Night" as "both pop and poetic" and "a dazzling summer banger". Acer Batislaong of Nylon Manila praised the song's use of Cebuano, writing, "Alamat once again embraces the beauty of the Cebuano language. It adds an extra touch of romance and allure to the song." Mira and Angelica Cruz, in a separate article for Wish 107.5 News and Features, both described the lyrics as "catchy".

The dance challenge for "Day and Night", which features an excerpt of the song and its choreography, made rounds on the social media app TikTok. It caught the attention of online audiences from the Philippines and beyond. In 2024, Alamat member Alas created a mashup of "Day and Night" and the song "Pantropiko" by Bini. Bini member Maloi uploaded a TikTok video of herself and Alamat member Jao dancing to the mashup as a duo. Alamat's official TikTok account also posted a TikTok video of both groups dancing to the mashup backstage at the University of the Philippines' annual fair in 2024. Writing about the mashup, Nica Glorioso of Nylon Manila noted the two groups' "joint virality".

== Music video ==
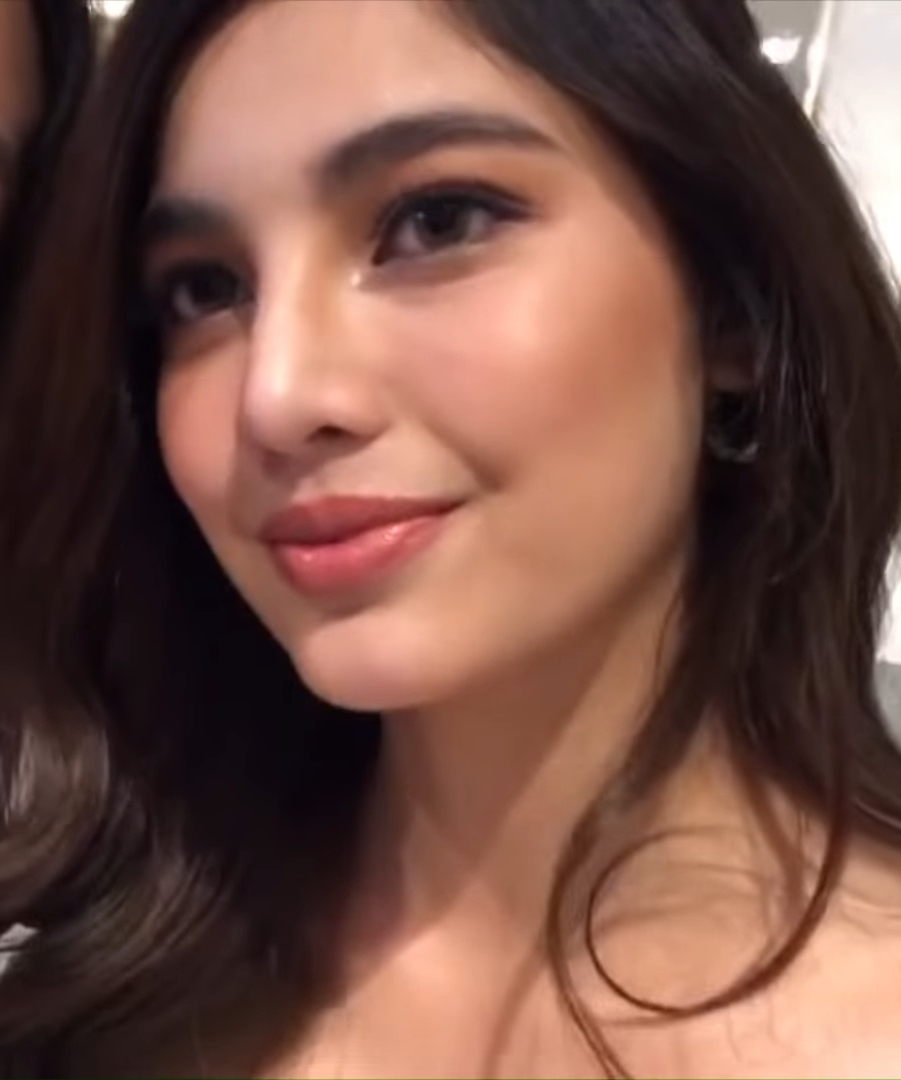
Jane de Leon (above) portrays Magindara (Note: a mermaid-like creature in Bicolano and Visayan folklore) in the music video for "Day and Night" by Alamat.

The music video stars actress Jane de Leon as Magindara, a mermaid-like mythological creature from Bicolano and Visayan mythology. She surfaces to the shore and grows a pair of human legs. Magindara smiles curiously as the Alamat members wave at her, holding out letters that spell "Mabuhay" (lit. 'Welcome'). At the end of the video, she loses her legs and returns to the ocean.

Both de Leon and the members of Alamat wear sustainable indigenous Philippine textiles and items in the music video, such as Tboli brass accessories. The group sourced the fabrics from the Department of Science and Technology (DOST)'s Philippine Textile Research Institute. Joey de Guzman directed the music video, with creative direction by Jason Paul Laxamana.

== Live performances ==
The group performed "Day and Night" on the GMA Network variety show All-Out Sundays, along with GMA talent Rayver Cruz. Alamat later performed it at the Dagundong Solo Concert, their first solo concert, which took place at the New Frontier Theater in December 2023. At Billboard Philippines' first anniversary celebration on October 15, 2024, Alamat performed a medley of "Day and Night" and "Maharani". Mayks Go of Billboard Philippines reported that "the hit tracks[...] effortlessly got those in attendance to cheer, move, and sing along from start to finish".

== Credits and personnel ==
Credits adapted from the song's official listing on YouTube.

- Thyro Alfaro – composer, producer, arranging, mix engineering, record engineering
- Therese Langit – composer
- Jan Fuertez – mastering
- Zebedee Zuniga – vocal arranging
- Martin Andrew Guevarra – record engineering

== Accolades ==
Awards and nominations for "Day and Night"
Organization	Year	Category	Result	Ref.
Awit Awards	2024	Best Dance/Electronic Recording	Nominated	
