= Alamat (band) =

Filipino boy band

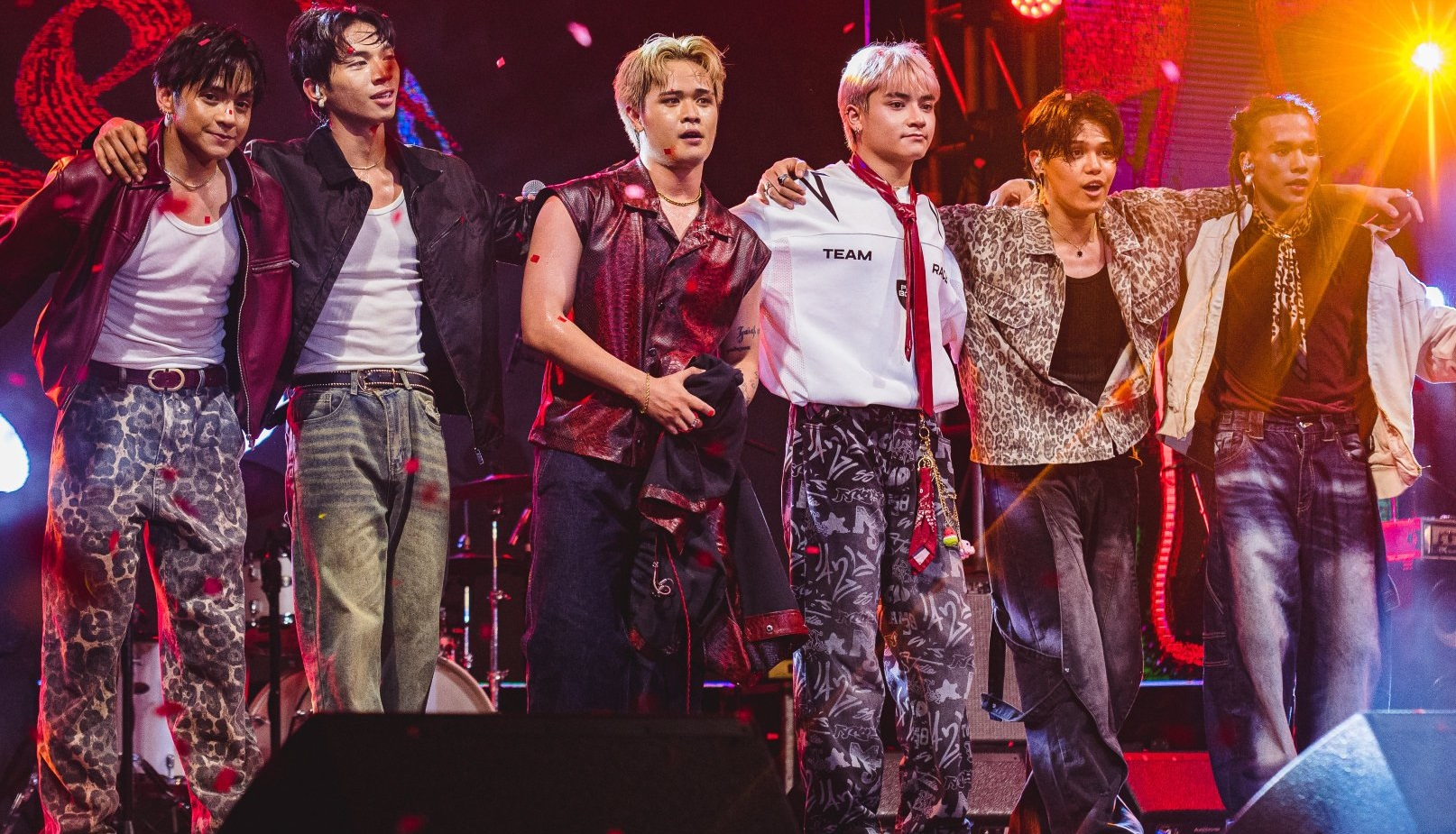
- Alamat in 2024 (left to right): Tomás, Taneo, Alas, Jao, R-Ji, Mo

Background information
- Origin: Manila, Philippines
- Genres: P-pop; Hip hop; R&B; Dance
- Years active: 2020–present
- Labels: Viva; Ninuno Media Inc.; Believe Music
- Members: Tomás; R-Ji; Taneo; Alas; Mo; Jao
- Past members: Kin; Valfer; Gami

Alamat (Baybayin: ᜀᜎᜋᜆ᜔; transl. Legend) (stylized in all caps) is a Filipino boy band formed in 2020 by Viva Artists Agency and Ninuno Media. The group consists of six members: Taneo, Mo, Jao, Tomás, R-Ji and Alas. The members hail from different regions of the Philippines and sing in their own respective languages.

Alamat debuted on February 14, 2021, with the multilingual R&B single "Kbye". It entered the Billboard Next Big Sound chart. In October 2022, they released their debut EP Pasulong, which contained singles like "Maharani" (transl. Great Queen), for which they won Best R&B Recording at the 36th Awit Awards. In November 2023, they released their first full-length album Isapuso (transl. Take to Heart), containing singles like "Day and Night" and "Dayang" (transl. Princess). The album received a rating of 3.5 stars out of 5 from Filipino news organization Rappler. On November 21, 2025, they released their second album Destino (transl. Destination), which received an 8/10 score from the British music magazine The Line of Best Fit. The album contains singles like "Hiraya" (transl. I Wish) and "LuzViMinda".

In July 2026, it was announced that Alamat will perform at the A Festival in Paris in October, making them the first P-pop group to perform in France.

== Name ==
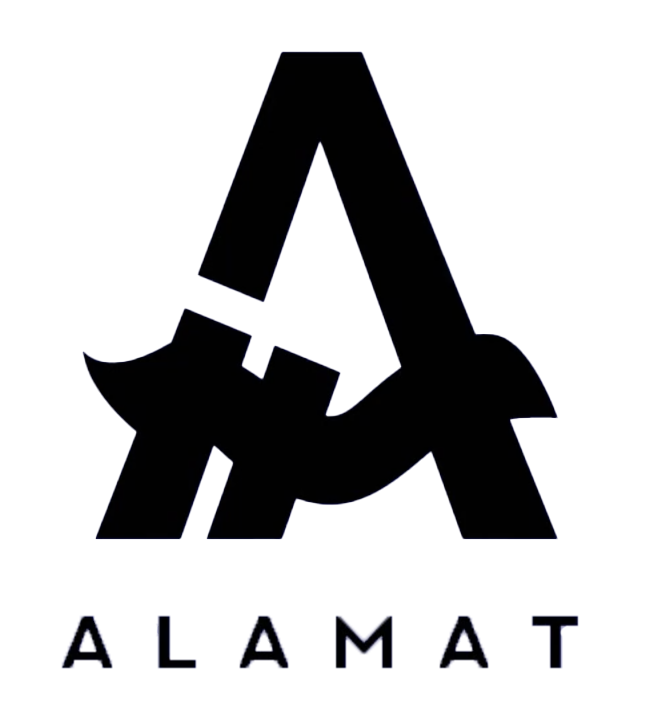
The official logo of Alamat

"Alamat" translates to "legend" in English. Their creative director, Jason Paul Laxamana, came up with the name. In an interview with The Beat Asia, the members of Alamat explained, "Legends are stories passed down to the youth, sparking their imagination and preserving our cultural heritage. We aim to do the same in everything we do. Legends are also figures we look up to, and we aspire to be one of them someday."

=== Fandom ===
Their fandom is called Magiliw, a Tagalog word meaning "affectionate" in English.

== History ==
=== 2020-2022: Formation, pre-debut activities, Pasulong ===
In May 2020, Viva Records and its subsidiary label, Ninuno Media, held auditions for a new P-Pop boy group. According to Laxamana, proficiency in a Philippine language was a prerequisite in the application process, beyond just talent in singing or dancing. He stated that his team always envisioned Alamat as a multilingual boy group. Prior to debuting, the group released covers of various songs, including "Tala" (lit. 'Star') and "Kilometro" (lit. 'Kilometer') by Sarah Geronimo and a multilingual rendition of "Wala Na Bang Pag-Ibig" (lit. 'Is There No Love Anymore') by Jaya, sung in each member's native language. The members underwent intensive training for nine months, which encompassed singing, dancing, physical fitness, and personality development, before they officially debuted on February 14, 2021, with the single "Kbye". Their training continued for years, even after their debut.

Alamat debuted with nine members: Taneo from Kalinga, Mo from Zambales, Jao from Pampanga, Kin from Quezon City, R-Ji from Eastern Samar, Valfer from Negros Occidental, Gami from Bohol, Tomas from Albay, and Alas from Davao City. The group distinguished itself as a multilingual and multiethnic boy band that sang in seven Philippine languages: Bikolano, Cebuano, Hiligaynon, Ilocano, Kapampangan, Tagalog, and Waray-Waray. A few weeks after "Kbye" was released, Alamat became the second P-Pop group to make it on Billboard's Next Big Sound chart after SB19, debuting at number two. Publications also regarded them as the fastest-rising Filipino act on the chart. Shortly after the achievement was reported in the media, Kin officially left Alamat.

The group released two more multilingual singles in 2021, "Kasmala" and "Porque" (lit. 'Why'). The latter is a cover of a song by the band UNiCA, formerly known as Maldita. Unlike "Kbye" and "Kasmala", the lyrics of "Porque" were in Tagalog and Chavacano, a Spanish-based creole language spoken in Zamboanga City. On February 14, 2022, the group's first anniversary, Alamat released the uplifting single "ABKD", (Note: The title is read as "ah bah kah dah". These are the first four letters of the modern Filipino alphabet.) which featured lyrics in Sambal, in addition to the languages that the group usually uses. Its music video premiered on February 22 and starred the Aeta actress Shella Mae Romualdo, alongside Aeta dancers. Valfer and Gami officially left the group shortly afterwards. On October 28, Alamat released their first extended play, Pasulong (lit. 'Forward'). The mini-album was released along with the single "Aswang" (Note: The word "aswang" is an umbrella term for malevolent shapeshifting creatures in Philippine mythology, particularly Visayan mythology. The song's official music video simply uses the generic translation "monster" for the word.) on all digital streaming platforms.

=== 2023-present: Isapuso, solo concerts ===
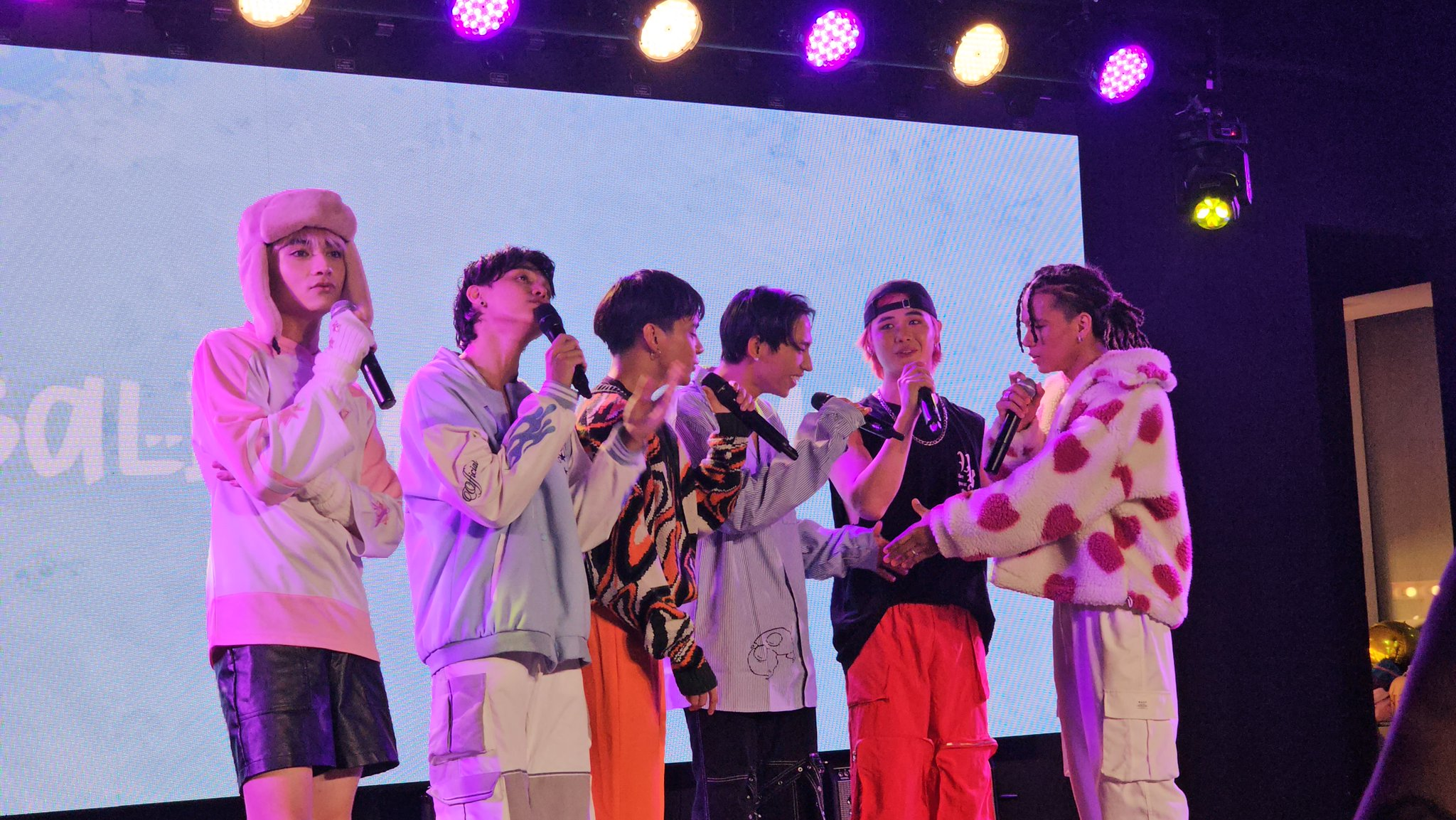
Alamat performing "Dong-Dong-Ay", a track from their album Isapuso, in December 2023

On June 14, 2023, Alamat released the first single from their then-upcoming album Isapuso (lit. 'Take to Heart'), "Day and Night". The song used a mix of Cebuano, English, and Tagalog, and was co-written by Therese Villarante-Langit, a famed Vispop songwriter. On November 3, Alamat released another single from the album, "Dagundong" (lit. 'Rumbling'). The following day, on November 4, the group released their first full-length album, Isapuso.

Joey Dizon of Rappler gave Isapuso 3.5 stars out of 5. In his review, he described the album as a "well-crafted product" boasting "sonic urgency" and sophistication that was rather uncommon to P-pop. Dizon wrote, "Arguably, though the group made immediate waves with their first few singles and established themselves as a hardworking unit – with the completion of last year's Pasulong EP and a continuous live ethic – I find that Isapuso is a stronger, more focused release that can finally catch the attention of non-fans of the P-pop movement like myself[...]," and concluded that "these kids are definitely alright."

On December 1, 2023, Alamat held their first solo concert, Dagundong, at the New Frontier Theater in Quezon City, Philippines. In June 2024, they performed at the Mist Music Festival in Toronto, Canada.

Alamat graced the cover of Metroscene Mag's November 2024 issue, modeling traditional Filipino garments reimagined by local designers. On December 6, Alamat held their second solo concert, Ragasa (lit. 'Rush'), at the New Frontier Theater. At the concert, the group performed a new version of their debut song "Kbye", as well as an unreleased song called "Champorado", (Note: The title refers to a sweet chocolate rice porridge in Philippine cuisine.) among other numbers. Each member had a solo performance. At Ragasa, the group revealed the title of their upcoming album, Destino (lit. 'Destination'). At the MassKara Festival, the group announced that they would release "LuzViMinda", the title track from Destino, on November 7 and the album itself on November 21. Destino received a favorable review from the British music magazine The Line of Best Fit, with writer Julienne Loreto praising it for "providing depth and beauty without sacrificing fun". The album was given a score of 8/10.

Alamat had two songs on the soundtrack of the mystery thriller series Hell University, which premiered in February 2026: "LuzViMinda", as well as a cover of "Yugto" (lit. 'Stage') by Rico Blanco. In July, it was announced that Alamat will perform at the A Festival in Paris in October, making them the first P-pop group to perform in France.

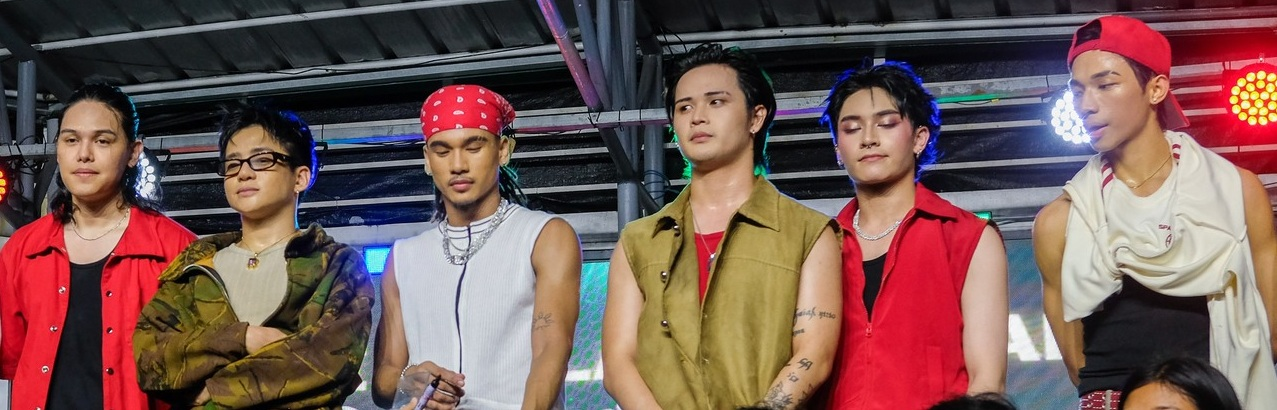
Filipino boy band Alamat in November 2025

== Artistry ==
Alamat's music blends indigenous instruments such as kudyapi and kulintang with modern sounds. Their choreography is also influenced by traditional dances, such as the Maranao dance singkil that inspired "Maharani".

The group's outfits typically blend modern fashion with traditional elements from the many cultures of the Philippines.

The members have written and produced many of their songs, including their debut single "Kbye". Mo has said that the song was the result of a "random and unplanned" jam session.

== Public image ==
In 2026, Alamat was ranked at number 89 on VMan SEA's "SEA 100" list, which consists of men who are influential in Southeast Asia.

=== Endorsements ===
In November 2026, Alamat became an ambassador for the clothing brand Oxgn (stylized in all caps), first appearing in the brand's holiday campaign alongside the girl group Xonara.

== Other ventures ==
=== Advocacy ===
The music video for the Alamat song "ABKD" condemned colorism and discrimination against the Aeta people, one of the Philippines' Indigenous groups. The video starred the young Aeta actress Shella Mae Romualdo and featured Aeta dancers. In 2024, Alamat performed at the University of the Philippines' annual advocacy-focused fair. They performed on Tuesday and Saturday during the week-long fair, with advocacies on those days focusing on free education and Indigenous rights respectively.

Jao has stated that Alamat aims to promote the Philippines' cultural diversity and multilingualism. They have also expressed support for the LGBTQ community.

=== Fashion ===
In October 2024, all of the Alamat members walked the runway at BYS Fashion Week 2024. They modeled upcycled pieces by Russell Villafuerte. They also modeled Charlotte Folk's new streetwear offerings alongside Karina Bautista.

== Members ==
=== Current ===
- Tomás - main vocalist, lead dancer & center
- R-Ji - lead vocalist, Visual
- Taneo - leader, main dancer, sub-vocalist
- Alas - main rapper
- Mo - main vocalist & lead rapper
- Jao - main dancer, sub-vocalist

=== Former ===
- Kin (2020–21) – lead vocalist, visual
- Valfer (2020–22) – lead rapper, sub-vocalist
- Gami (2020–22) – main vocalist

== Discography ==
=== Studio albums ===
List of studio albums with selected details
Title	Album Details
Isapuso	Released: November 3, 2023 (PH); Label: Viva Records; Format: CD, digital download, streaming
Destino	Released: November 21, 2025 (PH); Label: Viva Records; Format: CD, digital download, streaming

=== Extended plays ===
List of extended plays with selected details
Title	Album Details
Pasulong	Released: October 28, 2022 (PH); Label: Viva Records; Format: CD, digital download, streaming; Track listing: 1. "Aswang"; 2. "Maharani"; 3. "ILY ILY"; 4. "Gayuma"; 5. "Say U Love Me"; 6. "Hala"

=== Singles ===
Title	Year	Peak chart positions	Album
Title	Year	PHL	Album
"Kbye"	2021	—	Non-album singles
"Kasmala"	2021	—	Non-album singles
"Porque"	2021	—	Non-album singles
"ABKD"	2022	—	Non-album singles
"Sa Panaginip Na Lang"	2022	—	Non-album singles
"Say U Love Me"	2022	—	Pasulong
"Ily Ily" (with Lyca Gairanod)	2022	—	Pasulong
"Aswang"	2022	—	Pasulong
"Hala"	2022	—	Pasulong
"Maharani"	2023	80	Pasulong
"Gayuma"	2023	—	Pasulong
"Day & Night"	2023	—	Isapuso
"Walang Hanggan"	2023	—	Isapuso
"Dagundong"	2023	—	Isapuso
"Dayang"	2024	—	Isapuso
"Hiraya"	2024	—	Non-album singles
"LuzViMinda"	2025	—	Destino
Soundtrack appearance
"Sandigan"	2021	—	Anitu OST
Collaboration
"Tibay 'Yan" (with Iñigo Pascual)	2021	—	Coke Studio (Season 4)
"Kapit" (with Dwta)	2023	—	Coke Studio (Season 7)
"Road to Mythic" (with Kaia)	2024	—	Mobile Legends: Bang Bang
"Gupit" (The Juans featuring Alamat)	2024	—	Non-album single

== Filmography ==
=== Music videos ===
Year	Title	Director(s)	Length	Ref.
2021	"Kbye"		3:39	
2021	"Sandigan" (Visualizer)		2:46	
2021	"Kasmala"	Jason Paul Laxamana	3:17	
2021	"Tibay 'Yan"		5:44	
2021	"Porque"	Jason Paul Laxamana	4:58	
2022	"ABKD"	Jason Paul Laxamana	3:24	
2022	"Sa Panaginip Na Lang"	Jed Regala	4:46	
2022	"Say U Love Me"	Jason Paul Laxamana	4:39	
2022	"ILY ILY"	Jason Paul Laxamana	4:49	
2022	"Aswang"	Joey De Guzman	3:53	
2023	"Maharani"	Jason Paul Laxamana	4:42	
2023	"Gayuma"	Judd Figuerres	4:43	
2023	"Day and Night"	Joey De Guzman	3:42	
2024
2024	"Ang Galing DITO"		2:57	
2024	"Dayang"	Kerbs Balagtas	4:57	
2024	"Road to Mythic"	YouMeUs MNL	2:24	
2024	"Ngayong Gabi"		3:17	
2024	"Hiraya"	Jay-Ar Villarojas	3:28	

=== Television shows ===
Year	Month/Date	Program	Network	Ref.
2021	July 18	All-Out Sundays	GMA	
2021	August 5	Lunch Out Loud	TV5	
2022	March 13	ASAP	Kapamilya Channel/A2Z/TV5	
2022	April 10	ASAP	Kapamilya Channel/A2Z/TV5	
2022	July 13	Frontline sa Umaga	TV5	
2022	August 6	Newsroom	CNN Philippines	
2022	August 16	Family Feud	GMA	
2023	May 10	TiktoClock	GMA	
2023	June 26	It's Showtime	Kapamilya Channel/A2Z/TV5	
2024	April 1	It's Showtime	Kapamilya Channel/A2Z/GTV	
2024	April 4	Eat Bulaga!	TV5/RPTV	
2024	August 26	It's Showtime	Kapamilya Channel/A2Z/ALLTV/GMA/GTV	
2025	September 21	Rainbow Rumble	Kapamilya Channel/A2Z/ALLTV	
2026	January 26	It's Showtime	Kapamilya Channel/A2Z/ALLTV/GMA	
2026	February 2	It's Showtime	Kapamilya Channel/A2Z/ALLTV/GMA	

== Concerts ==
Standalone Concert
Event name	Dates	Venue	Location	Ref.
Dagundong: Alamat First Solo Concert	December 1, 2023	New Frontier Theater	Quezon City	

International Concerts
Event name	Dates	Venue	Location	Ref.
Winter Carnival 2023	December 23, 2023	P7 Arena, Media One Hotel, Dubai	Dubai	

Concert Participation
Event name	Dates	Venue	Location	Ref.
G Music Fest 2021	September 25–26, 2021	Remote Location		
UP Fair: Awit Mo'y Paglaya	November 12, 2021	UP Diliman	Quezon City	
ARRIVAL: The Next Chapter of OPM	November 27, 2021	Remote Location		
Padayon: Online Concert for Typhoon Odette	March 25–26, 2022	Remote Location		
2022 PPOPCON	April 10, 2022	Araneta Coliseum	Quezon City	
Tugatog: Filipino Music Festival	July 15, 2022	Mall of Asia Arena	Pasay	
2023 PPOPCON	July 16, 2023	Araneta Coliseum	Quezon City	
2023 FIBA Basketball World Cup opening ceremony	August 25, 2023	Philippine Arena	Bocaue	
ILYSM... A Valentine Harana Concert	February 13, 2024	Araneta Coliseum	Quezon City	

== Awards and nominations ==
Year	Award(s)	Category	Nominated work	Result	Refs.
2021	VP Choice Awards 2021	Group Performer of the Year	Alamat	Nominated	
2021	RAWR Awards	Favorite Group	Alamat	Nominated	
2021	6th PPOP Awards	PPOP Music Video of the Year	"kasmala"	Won	
2022	NYLON Manila Big, Bold, Brave Awards	Favorite P-Pop Group	Alamat	Nominated	
2022	7th PPOP Awards	PPOP Boy Group of the Year	Alamat	Nominated	
2022	7th PPOP Awards	Pop Song of the Year for Cultural Relevance	"ABKD"	Won	
2022	TikTok Awards Philippines	PPOP Group of the Year	Alamat	Nominated	
2022	27th Asian Television Awards	Best Music Video	"Tibay 'Yan"	Won	
2023	VP Choice Awards 2023	Group Performer of the Year	Alamat	Nominated	
2023	NYLON Manila Big, Bold, Brave Awards	Favorite P-Pop Group	Alamat	Nominated	
2023	36th Awit Awards	Best R&B Recording	"Maharani"	Won	
2023	36th Awit Awards	Album of the Year	"Pasulong"	Nominated	
2023	Dabeme Music Awards	Album of the Year	"Pasulong"	Won	
2023	49th Metro Manila Film Festival	Best Original Theme Song	"Dagundong" (from Penduko)	Nominated	
2023	8th PPOP Awards	Philippine Pop Boy Group of the Year	Alamat	Won	
2023	8th PPOP Awards	Philippine Pop ICON Group Of The Year (Special Award)	Alamat	Won	
2023	8th PPOP Awards	Philippine Pop Top Male Vocalist of the Year	Mo	Won	
2023	8th PPOP Awards	Philippine Pop Top Male Rapper of the Year	Alas	Won	
2023	8th PPOP Awards	Philippine Pop Top Male Visual of the Year	Tomas	Won	
2023	8th PPOP Awards	Philippine Pop Top Male Dancer of the Year	Jao	Won	
2024
2024	5th VP Choice Awards	Group Performer of the Year	Alamat	Nominated	
2024	5th VP Choice Awards	P-Pop Song of the Year	"Dagundong"	Nominated	
2024	5th VP Choice Awards	Music Video of the Year	"Dagundong"	Nominated	
2024	Philippines Pageant Evaluation & Awards	Best Guest Performer	Alamat	Won	
2024	15th PMPC Star Awards for Music	Pop Album of the Year	"Pasulong"	Nominated	
2024	Awit Awards	Best Dance/Electronic Recording	"Day and Night"	Nominated	
2024	Myx Music Awards	Mellow Video of the Year	"Walang Hanggan"	Nominated	
2024	P-pop Music Awards	Album of the Year	Isapuso	Nominated	
2024	P-pop Music Awards	Collaboration of the Year	"Gupit" (with The Juans)	Nominated	
2024	P-pop Music Awards	Cultural Excellence Award	Alamat	Awardee	

=== Listicles ===
Name of publisher, name of listicle, year listed, and placement result
Publisher	Listicle	Year	Result	Ref.
Billboard Philippines	P-pop Rising Class	2025	Placed	
