= Vxon =

Filipino boy band

VXON
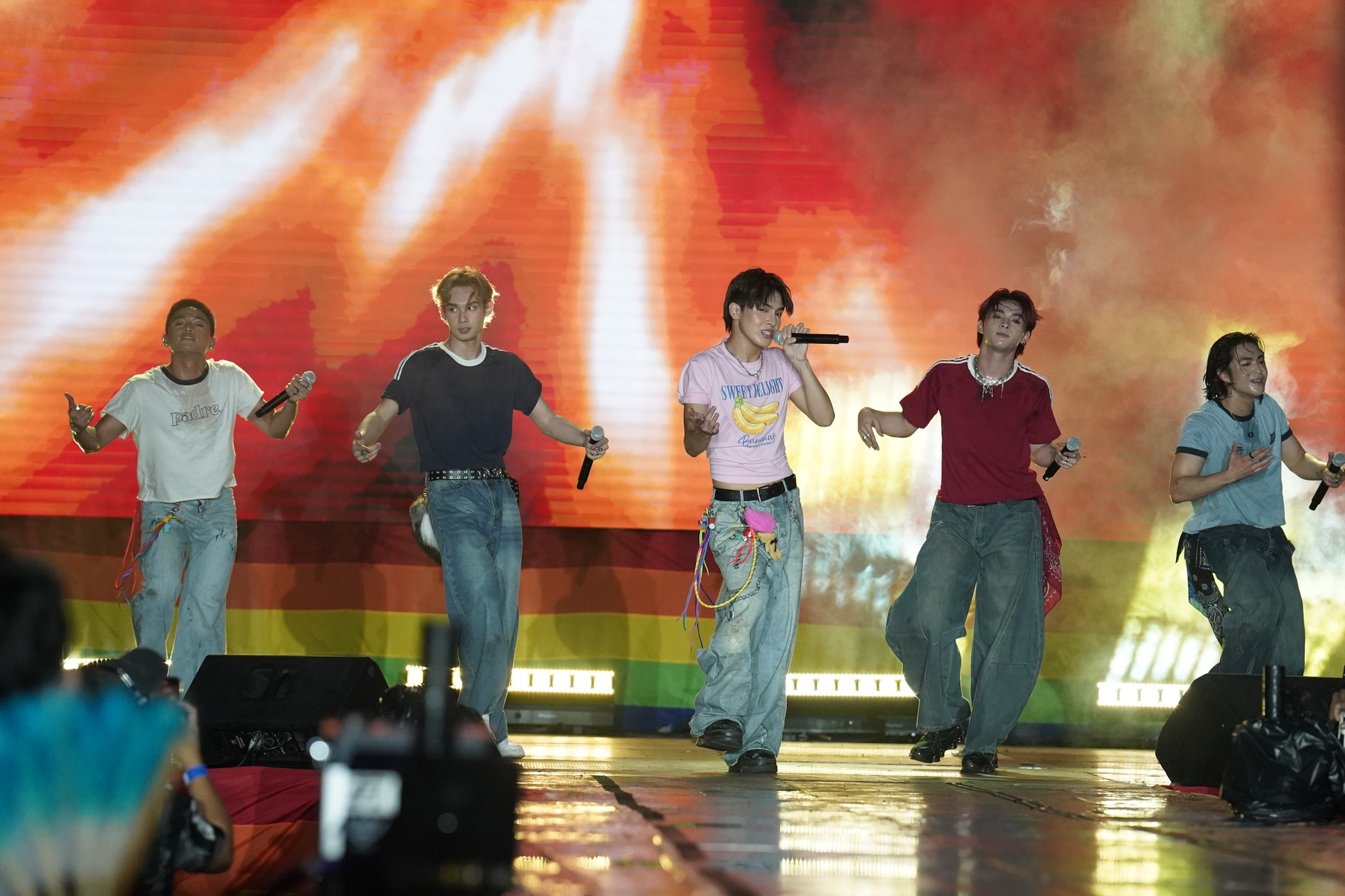
- VXON in 2025 (left to right): Sam, Vince, Franz, Patrick, C13

Background information
- Origin: Manila, Philippines
- Genres: P-pop; Hip hop; Dance
- Years active: 2022–present
- Labels: Cornerstone Entertainment; Republic Records Philippines (UMG)
- Members: C13; Sam; Franz; Vince; Patrick
- Website: Official website

Vxon (read as vision; stylized in all caps) is a Filipino boy band formed by Cornerstone Entertainment. The group is composed of five members: C13, Sam, Franz, Vince, and Patrick. Dubbed as the "Monsters of P-pop" by the public and various media, they made their official debut upon the release of their single "The Beast" on January 7, 2022. In the same year, the group performed at the inaugural PPOPCON and released several singles, including "Fiyaah", which reached the top of iTunes charts in the United Arab Emirates and the Philippines.

== History ==
=== Pre-debut ===
In the latter part of December 2021, Cornerstone Entertainment announced their first boy group under their management consisting of C13, Sam, Franz, Vince, and Patrick. The group's lineup included members with prior experience in the entertainment industry. C13 previously appeared on the South Korean reality competition program Under Nineteen using his original name, Christian, and made his solo debut in 2021. Sam made his acting debut in 2019's Starla and appeared in several TV series, including Oh, Mando! and Wheel of Love: Weekend to Remember. Franz joined the first season of The Voice Kids. Vince and Patrick were both regulars in local performance competitions.

=== 2022–2023: Debut with "The Beast" and career beginnings ===
The official logo of VXON

VXON released their debut single "The Beast" on January 7, 2022. The song is produced by C13 and Korean music producer Knockloud, while the choreography is created by Matt Padilla of the Philippine All Stars and South Korea's Kim Tae-hoon of 1Million Dance Studio and The Bips. On April 1, the group released their second single "P.S", which is co-written by C13, Franz, and Sam. In the same month, the group performed at the inaugural edition of PPOPCON, alongside other P-pop groups like SB19, Bini, and Kaia. The group also released several soundtracks for different shows, such as "Reach the Top" in July for TV5's reality competition Top Class: Rise To P-Pop Stardom and "Luv Is" with Zephanie in August for GMA Network's TV series of the same title. In September 2022, VXON was announced as Realme's first P-pop group ambassador, coinciding with the release of their third single "Fiyaah", which incorporates English, Filipino, and Spanish. The song achieved local and international success, reaching top positions on iTunes charts in the United Arab Emirates and the Philippines. In October, the group collaborated with Jonathan Manalo and released a remake of the single "Ikaw Na Na Na" originally performed by Gimme 5.

On January 1, 2023, VXON was honored by the TAG Awards Chicago as the 2022 Band of the Year (Bronze), alongside SB19 and Ben&Ben, who received gold and silver, respectively. In the same month, the group also released their fourth single "Dulo", marking their first anniversary in the industry. In February 2023, VXON won in Nylon Manila's Big Bold Brave Awards 2023 as the Favorite Rookie P-pop Group. The group also released several singles, "Breaking Bad" in March, "Pretty Please" in June, and "Lisan" and "Sandal" in August and September, respectively.

=== 2024–present: 20:20 ===
On January 26, 2024, the group released their first studio album titled 20:20. The album comprises nine songs, including the lead tracks "SSP (Saksak sa Puso)" and "Kalaw", as well as previously released tracks "Lisan" and "Sandal". Notably, the album features collaborations with other artists, including G22's AJ on the track "O Kay Sarap", Zephanie on "Miss na Kita", and MC Einstein on "Gamu-Gamo". In July, Philpop Himig Handog released twelve songs that would compete in its annual competition. The group performed one of the songs, "MHWG," written by Rob Angeles.

In commemoration of VXON's third anniversary, the single "Agila" was released on January 10, 2025. This was subsequently followed by the release of "Tabi Tabi" in March and "Sh*t Sobrang Init" in April. On June 26, 2025, the group released a funk pop song "Dapat Lang Ako Lang".

== Members ==
VXON is composed of five members, namely:

- C13 – leader, main rapper
- Sam – lead vocalist, lead rapper
- Franz – main vocalist
- Vince – lead vocalist
- Patrick – main dancer

== Discography ==
=== Studio albums ===
List of studio albums
Title	Details
20:20	Released: January 26, 2024; Labels: Cornerstone Entertainment, Republic Records Philippines, UMG Philippines; Formats: Digital download, streaming; Track listing: 1. "SSP (Saksak sa Puso)"; 2. "Kalaw"; 3. "Gamu-Gamo" ft. MC Einstein; 4. "Coco" ft. VXON Patrick; 5. "O Kay Sarap" ft. G22 AJ; 6. "Miss na Kita" ft. Zephanie; 7. "KNT (Kanta ng Tanga)"; 8. "Lisan" (Stripped ver.); 9. "Sandal"

=== Singles ===
List of singles, showing year released, and associated albums
Title	Year	Album
"The Beast"	2022	Non-album single
"P.S"	2022	Non-album single
"Fiyaah"	2022	Non-album single
"Ikaw Na Na Na" (orig. song by Gimme 5)	2022	Non-album single
"Dulo"	2023	Non-album single
"Breaking Bad"	2023	Non-album single
"Pretty Please"	2023	Non-album single
"Lisan"	2023	Non-album single
"Sandal"	2023	Non-album single
"SSP (Saksak sa Puso)"	2024	20:20
"Kalaw"	2024	20:20
"MHWG"	2024	Non-album single
"Agila"	2025	Non-album single
"Tabi Tabi"	2025	Non-album single
"Sh*t Sobrang Init"	2025	Non-album single
"Dapat Lang Ako Lang"	2025	Non-album single

=== Soundtrack appearances ===
List of media in which VXON's songs have been used
Year	Film/series/program	Song(s)	Ref.
2022	Top Class: Rise To P-Pop Stardom	"Reach the Top"	
2023	Luv Is	"Luv Is" (with Zephanie)	

== Awards and nominations ==
Name of the award ceremony, year presented, category, nominee of the award, and the result of the nomination
Award ceremony	Year	Category	Nominee / Work	Result	Ref.
Awit Awards	2023	Best Pop Recording	"Ikaw Na Na Na"	Shortlisted	
Awit Awards	2023	Best Pop Recording	"Luv Is"	Shortlisted	
Awit Awards	2024	Best Performance by a Group	"Lisan"	Shortlisted	
Awit Awards	2025	Best Pop Recording	"MHWG"	Shortlisted	
Awit Awards	2025	Best Rap/Hiphop Recording	"Gamu-Gamo"	Shortlisted	
Music Rank Asian Choice Awards	2023	Rising Asian Artist	VXON	2nd Place	
Nylon Manila's Big Bold Brave Awards	2023	Favorite Rookie P-pop Group	VXON	Won	
Nylon Manila's Big Bold Brave Awards	2024	Favorite P-pop Group	VXON	Nominated	
Philippines Choice Awards (Saludo Excellence Award)	2023	Best Male P-pop Group	VXON	Won	
P-pop Music Awards	2022	P-pop Main Visual of the Year (Male Category)	Vince	Won	
P-pop Music Awards	2023	P-pop Top Main Dance of the Year (Male)	Patrick	Won	
P-pop Music Awards	2025	Rising Boy Group of the Year	VXON	Nominated	
RAWR Awards	2023	Favorite Group	VXON	Nominated	
TAG Awards Chicago	2022	Band of the Year	VXON	Bronze	
TAG Awards Chicago	2023	#TAG25Under25	C13, Sam, Patrick, Franz	Nominated	
TikTok Awards Philippines	2022	P-pop Group of the year	VXON	Nominated	
VP Choice Awards	2023	P-pop Song of the Year	"The Beast"	Nominated	
VP Choice Awards	2023	VP/Spotlight of the Year (January & February)	VXON	Won	
VP Choice Awards	2023	Group Performer of the Year	VXON	Nominated	
VP Choice Awards	2024	Group Performer of the Year	VXON	Nominated	
VP Choice Awards	2024	P-pop Song of the Year	"Sandal"	Nominated	
VP Choice Awards	2024	Video of the Year	"Sandal"	Nominated	
VP Choice Awards	2025	P-pop Song of the Year	"SSP"	Nominated	
VP Choice Awards	2026	P-pop Song of the Year	"Sh*t Sobrang Init"	Nominated	
VP Choice Awards	2026	P-pop Group of the Year	VXON	Nominated	

=== Listicles ===
Name of publisher, name of listicle, year listed, and placement result
Publisher	Listicle	Year	Result	Ref.
Billboard Philippines	P-pop Rising Class	2025	Placed	
