= PPOPCON =

Annual fan convention and concert in the Philippines

PPOPCON Pinoy Pop Convention and Concert
- Logo used in promotional materials since 2022
- Status: Inactive
- Genre: Fan convention; concert
- Location: Quezon City
- Country: Philippines
- Inaugurated: 2022; 4 years ago
- Most recent: 2023; 3 years ago
- Website: ppopcon.ph

The Pinoy Pop Convention and Concert (PPOPCON) is a music fan convention and concert intended to celebrate Pinoy pop music and culture annually. With its first edition held on April 9 and 10, 2022, it is the first and biggest event of its kind in the Philippines.

The event was announced to take place two years after on-ground concerts had been halted by the COVID-19 pandemic in the Philippines, which caused a two-year lockdown in the country. The April 10 concert was the biggest entertainment event to take place at the Araneta Coliseum since 2020.

== History ==
=== 2022: Inaugural edition ===
The PPOPCON was first announced on February 15, 2022, across their official social media platforms, announcing that the event aimed to gather P-pop fans and celebrate Pinoy pop culture and music.

The head of PPOPCON Project, Andie Salutin, released a press release on March 28, 2022, stating that "P-Pop is quickly gaining international attention and many fans are recognizing the talent and passion of many P-Pop acts.", and that "through PPOPCON, we are celebrating the growing P-Pop community through the first event of its kind right here at the City of Firsts."

The COVID-19 pandemic restricted established acts as well as debuting acts from holding in-person events, instead opting to do taped performances and music videos to offset the lack of physical connection with an audience. The event was one of the events that marked the return of live entertainment in the Philippines since the onset of the COVID-19 pandemic.

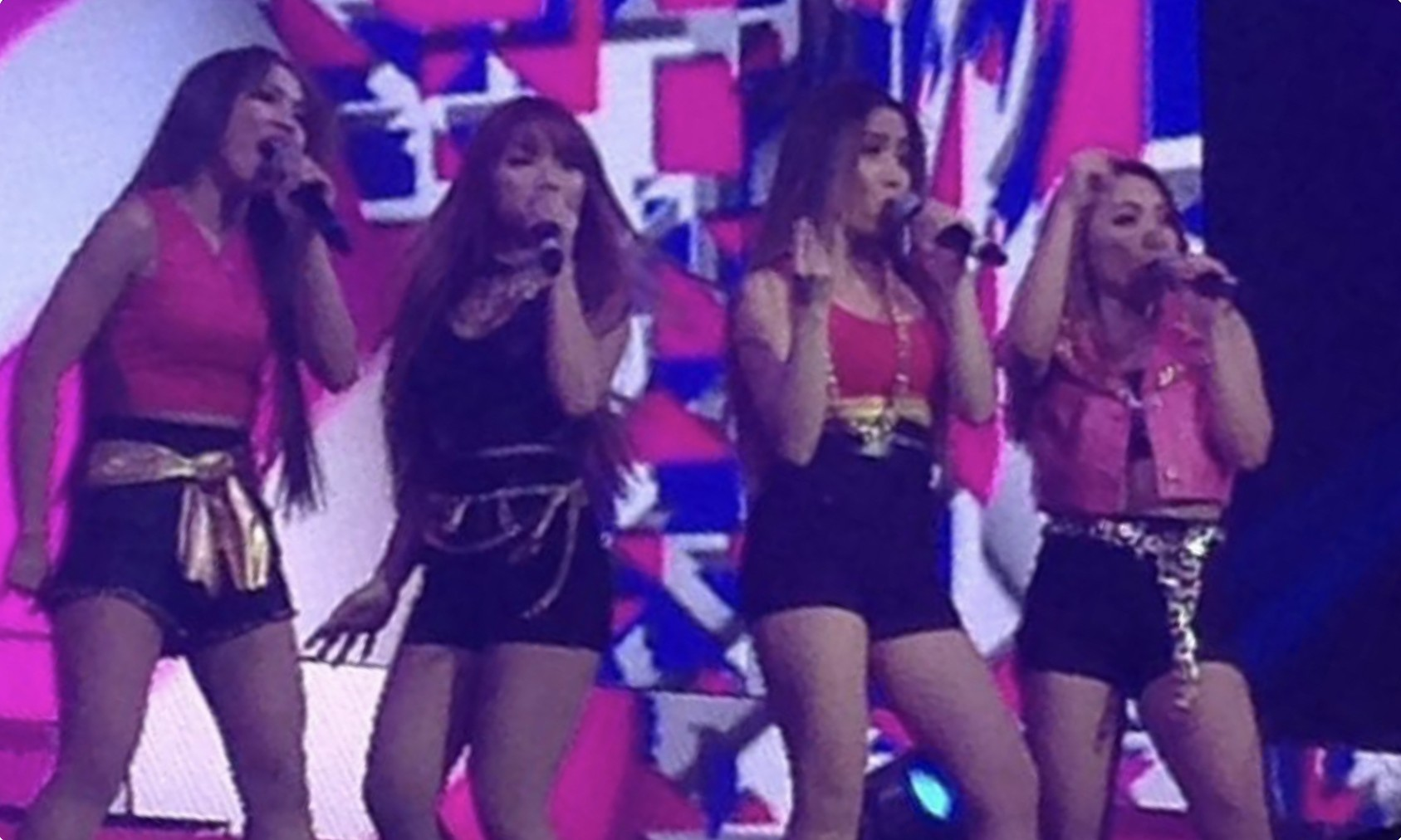
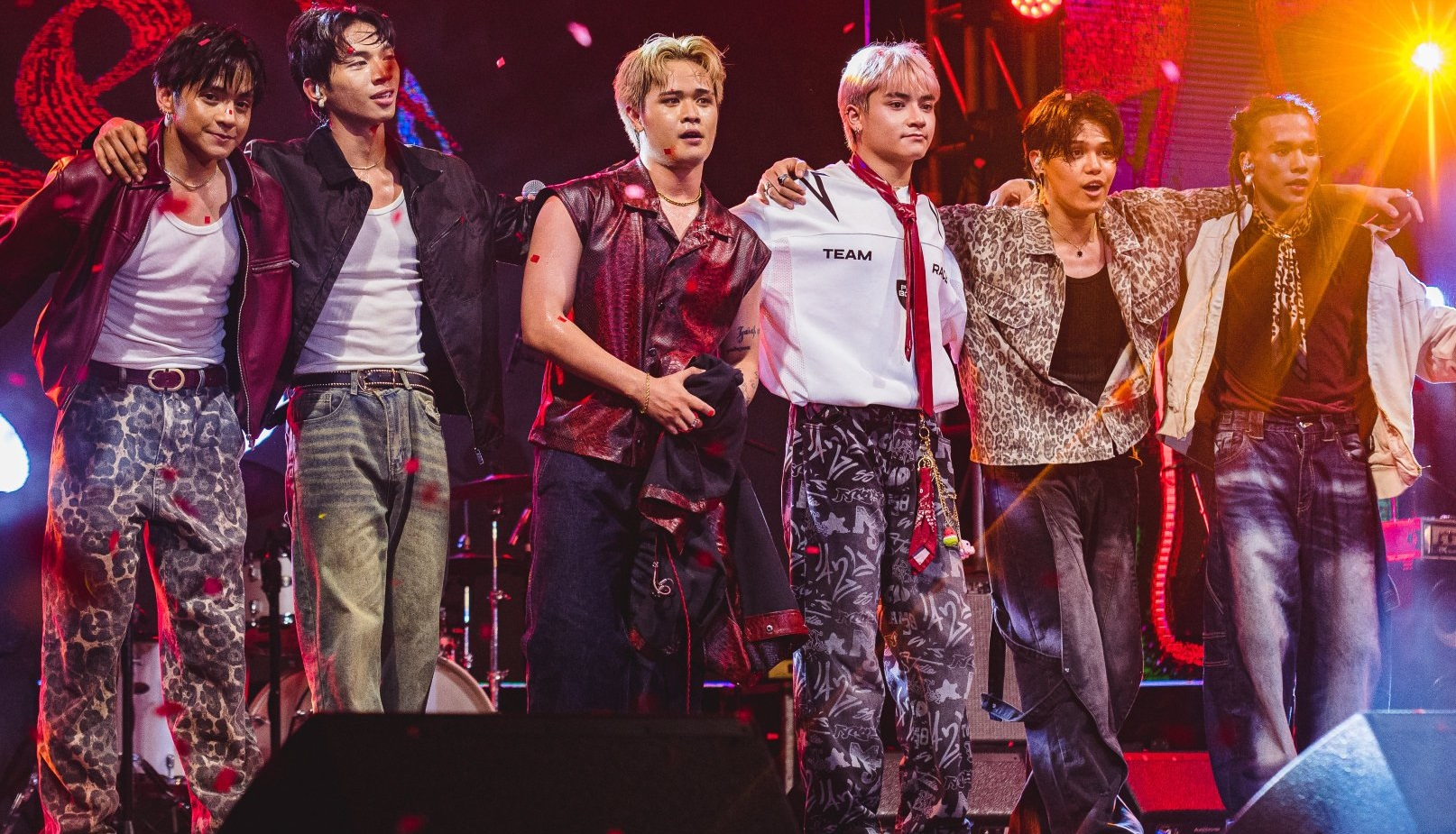
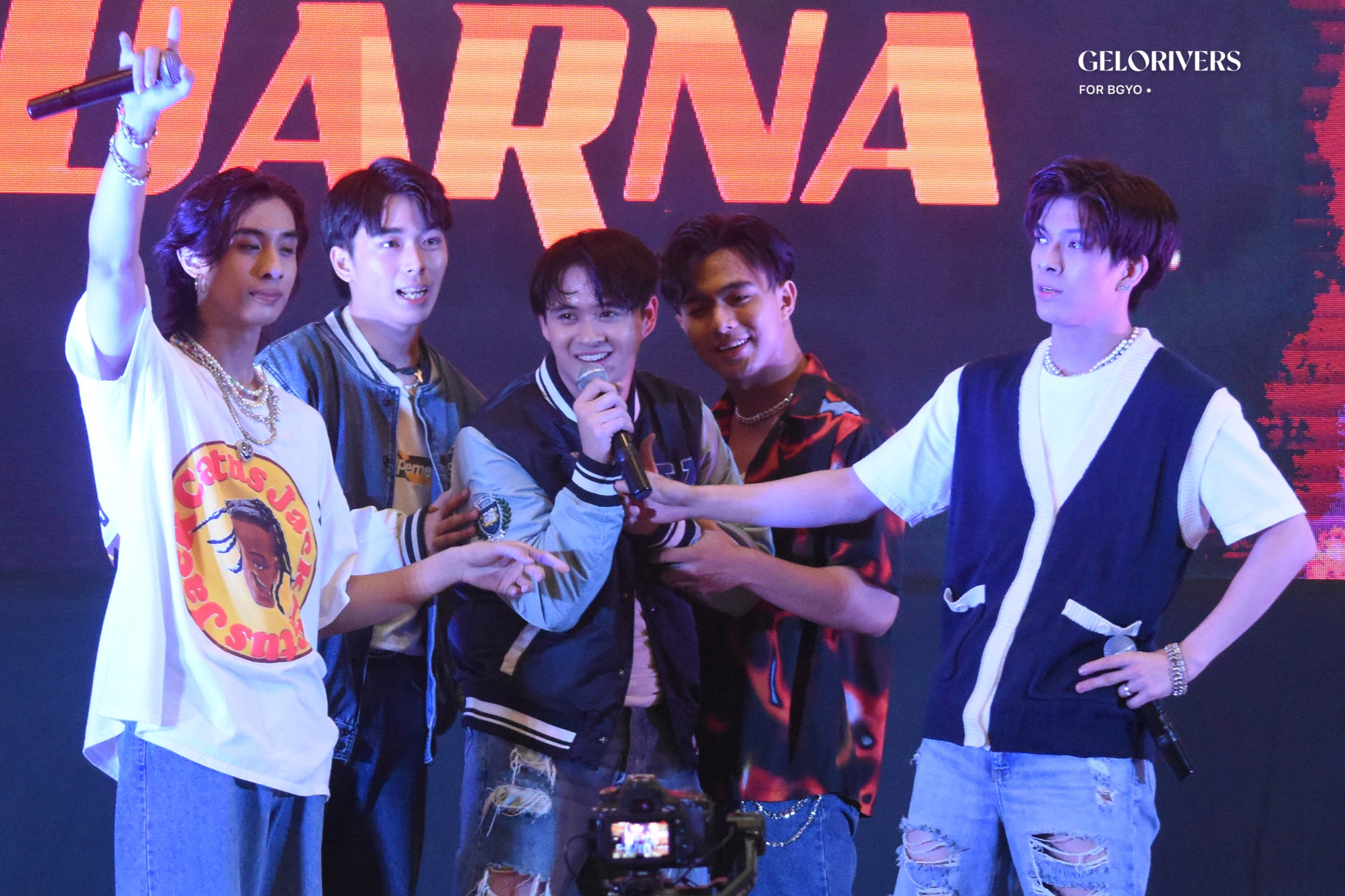
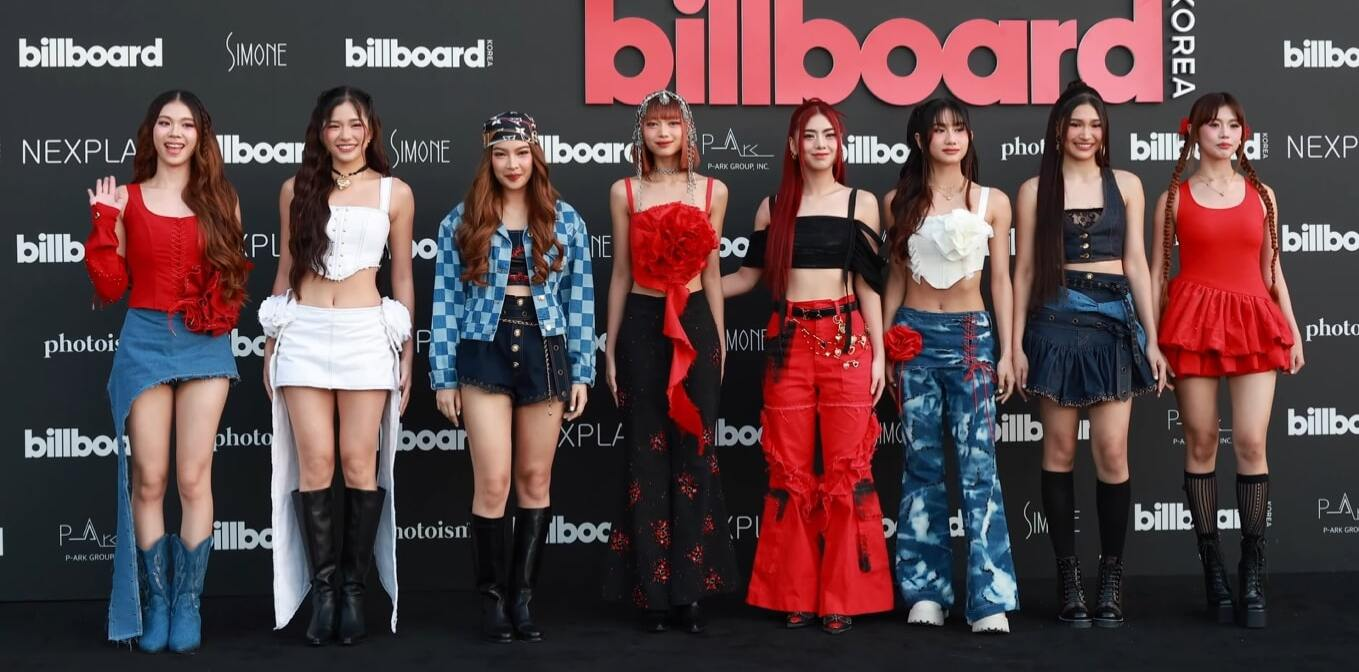
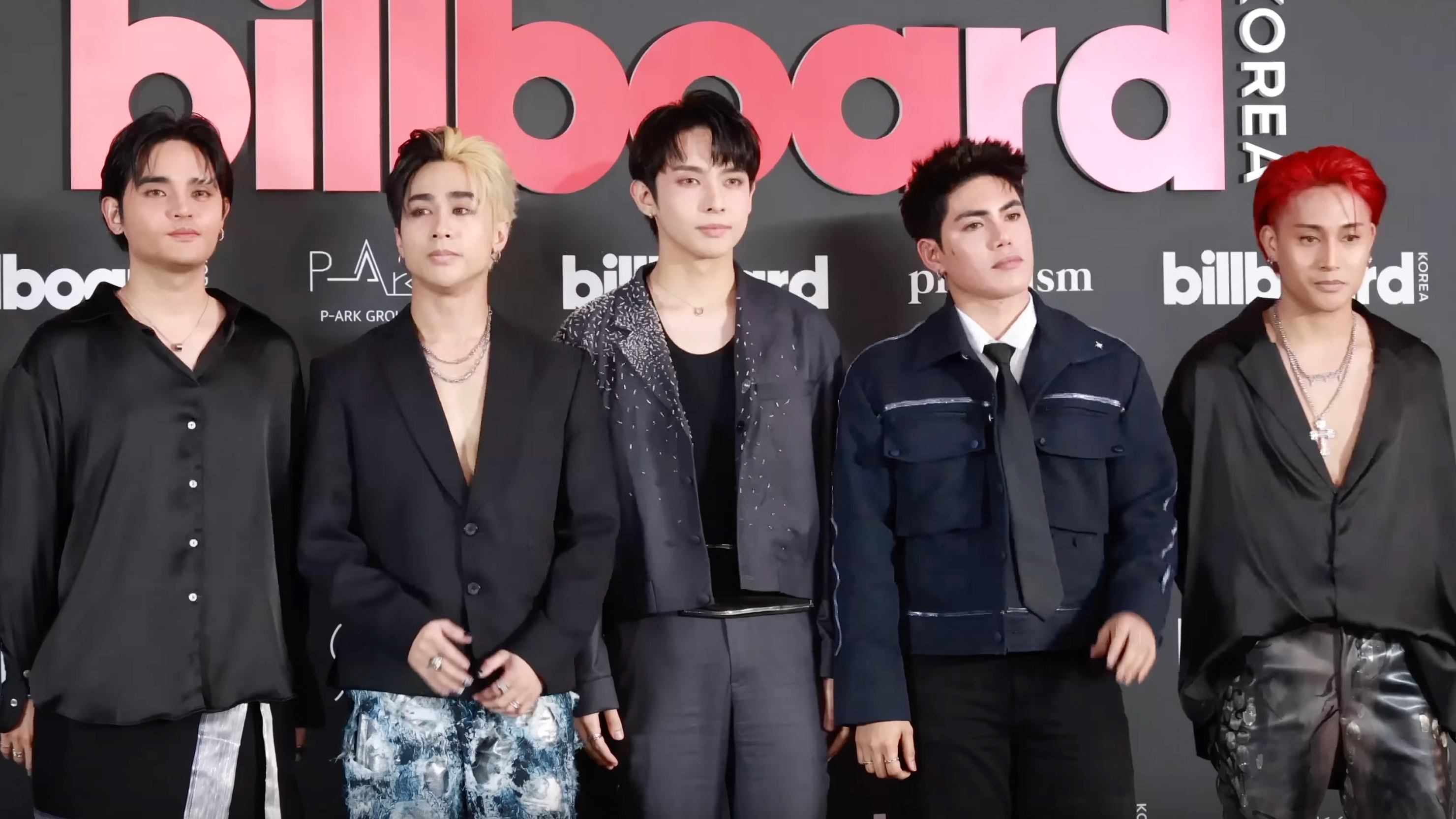
4th Impact, Alamat, BGYO, Bini, and SB19, were among the performers for 2022 PPOPCON.

The lineup of artists for the event was announced on March 7, 2022, and included 1st.One, 4th Impact, Alamat, BGYO, Bini, Calista, Daydream, Dione, G22, Kaia, MNL48, PPOP Generation, Press Hit Play, R Rules, SB19, and Vxon. On March 30, 2022, a media conference was held at Novotel Manila Araneta City with several Filipino pop groups present in person and through teleconference sharing their preparations and thoughts on the event. On the same conference, SB19 shared their optimism about the positive impact of the first-ever convention for Pinoy pop, saying that "it could be the spark that the music industry in the Philippines was waiting for to showcase Filipino talents across the world" and adding "that P-pop could contribute with the growth of the Philippine economy".

Leading up to the opening day of the event, various promotional activities were held, including a series of live-ticket selling events, mall shows and artist activities. 4th Impact, Press Hit Play, Kaia and 1st.One also performed on the Wish Bus. The first day of the convention saw fan booths, merch stands, games, and performances on April 9 at New Frontier Theater. The concert, featuring eleven of the participating artists, took place the following day at the Smart Araneta Coliseum, and lasted for six hours.

=== 2023: Second edition and PPOPCOM ===
After a successful debut, the second edition of the event was announced on January 31, 2023, and was scheduled to run from March 18 to 19, in the same venues as the last edition. The event's lineup was announced on February 5, 2023, which included many acts from the previous year, as well as debuting artists. Artists from the lineup also engaged in mall tours and charity work in the run-up to the event. However, on March 9, 2023, the organizers of the event issued a statement announcing the event's postponement, citing logistical issues. Ticketholders were encouraged to keep their tickets, as they announced that they would still be valid at the event's rescheduled dates.

The announcement prompted disappointment online. As a result, an event titled PPOPCOM (Pinoy Pop Community Event), was organized by members of different P-pop fandoms within ten days. The event was held on March 19, 2023, and saw performances from artists from the event's original lineup, including Kaia and Ver5us. Rappler praised the event as "inspiring".

The resumption of the event would later be announced on July 2, 2023, along with an expanded lineup of 33 artists, including all groups from the first edition, and 16 debuting artists. Music streaming platform Spotify served as the convention's "official music partner". The rescheduled convention was held from July 14 to 15, 2023, at the newly-opened Quantum Skyview at the Gateway Mall. The event culminated with the concert, held on the third day at the Smart Araneta Coliseum.

== Locations and dates ==
Underlined artists indicate debuting artists. Italicized artists indicate first physical live performance of artist in Manila due to debuting during the community quarantine period of the country.

Locations and dates of PPOPCON
Edition	Dates	Venues		Participating artists
Edition	Dates	Convention	Concert	Participating artists
1st	April 9–10, 2022	New Frontier Theater	Araneta Coliseum	1st.One, 4th Impact, Alamat, BGYO, Bini, Calista, Daydream, Dione, G22, Kaia, MNL48, PPOP Generation, Press Hit Play, R Rules, SB19, Vxon
2nd	July 14–16, 2023	Quantum Skyview	Araneta Coliseum	1st.One, 6ense, Alamat, BGYO, Bilib, Bini, Blvck Flowers, Calista, Josh Cullen, Daydream, Dione, Eclipse, Felip, G22, HYV, Hori7on, Kaia, MNL48, Mona Gonzales, PPOP Generation, Press Hit Play, R Rules, SB19, SMS, Sheki, Skouts, The Juans, Valfer, Ver5us, Vxon, Yara, Yes My Love, Z2Z
