= List of And I Love You So episodes =

And I Love You So is a 2015 Philippine melodrama television series directed by Onat Diaz, starring Julia Barretto, Miles Ocampo, Dimples Romana and Angel Aquino. The series premiered on ABS-CBN's Kapamilya Gold afternoon block and worldwide on The Filipino Channel from December 7, 2015, to March 11, 2016, replacing Walang Iwanan.

== List of episodes ==
In the table below, the green numbers represent the highest ratings and the red numbers represent the lowest ratings.

Episode no.	Title	Synopsis	Twitter Hashtag	Original Air Date	Kantar Media Rating (Nationwide)
1	"Pagsisimula" (The Beginning)	Trixie and Joanna are born in a world where love is nothing but a competition.	#AILYSPagsisimula	December 7, 2015	13.3%
2	"Huwag Mo Akong Hawakan" (Don't Touch Me)	The world becomes smaller for Trixie and Joanna.	#AILYSDontTouchMe	December 8, 2015	14.2%
3	"Paghaharap" (Confrontation)	Michelle and Alfonso are about to meet again.	#AILYSConfrontation	December 9, 2015	14.3%
4	"Malaya Sa Wakas" (Free At Last)	Looks like Trixie now has a reason to smile.	#AILYSFreeAtLast	December 10, 2015	12.4%
5	"Pagbabalik ni Katrina" (Katrina's Back)	Between Joanna and Trixie, there can only be one best in class.	#AILYSKatrinasBack	December 11, 2015	13.2%
6	"Babawiin Kita" (Gonna Get You Back)	Make way for the return of Katrina Cervantes-Valdez.	#AILYSBabawiinKita	December 14, 2015	12.6%
7	"Lalaban Ka" (You Should Fight)	Katrina has returned, but her daughter, Trixie, may not be ready to welcome her mother back into her life.	#AILYSLalabanKa	December 15, 2015	13.8%
8	"Magkaibigan" (Friends)	As Trixie finally opens her heart to Joanna, Alfonso wins back Michelle's love. Katrina, however, starts her plot to take revenge on Michelle.	#AILYSFriends	December 16, 2015	11.4%
9	"Pagpapawalang Bisa ng Kasal" (Annulment)	Trixie and Joanna are slowly becoming the best of friends.	#AILYSAnnulment	December 17, 2015	12.0%
10	"Kaibigan at Kalaban" (Frenemy)	Will Michelle tell Alfonso the truth that Joanna is his daughter?	#AILYSFrenemy	December 18, 2015	12.9%
11	"Ang Totoo" (The Truth)	Trixie is about to discover the truth about Michelle and Alfonso!	#AILYSTheTruth	December 21, 2015	11.9%
12	"Ang Pag-alok ng Kasal" (The Proposal)	After years of being apart, Alfonso now grabs the chance of marrying his true love Michelle. However, their celebration is cut short as Katrina comes back and puts all her plans to work.	#AILYSTheProposal	December 22, 2015	11.4%
13	"Ang Alok" (The Offer)	Katrina makes sure she gets back whats rightfully hers as she surprises Alfonso in her return.	#AILYSTheOffer	December 23, 2015	9.8%
14	"Magkapatid na Valdez" (Valdez Sisters)	Alfonso treats Michelle and her daughters to dinner, but Trixie tries to ruin her father's plan since she feels like she's not part of the new family.	#AILYSValdezSisters	December 24, 2015	10.1%
15	"Mga Regalo" (Gifts)	Trixie's jealous towards Joanna grows by the day as she manages to bond with Alfonso and Justin.	#AILYSGifts	December 25, 2015	8.1%
16	"Ang Ahas" (The Snake)	Alfonso and Michelle sense that Katrina is back.	#AILYSTheSnake	December 28, 2015	10.1%
17	"Inalis" (Displaced)	Alfonso and Michelle's celebration is cut short as Katrina out her plans to work.	#AILYSDisplaced	December 29, 2015	10.8%
18	"Si Katrina At Si Yaya" (Katrina And Yaya)	Trixie has a few more tricks up her sleeves.	#AILYSKatrinaAndYaya	December 30, 2015	9.9%
19	"Ang Rebelasyon ni Dexter" (Dexter's Revelation)	Trixie's facial treat didn't turn out well for Joanna.	#AILYSDextersRevelation	December 31, 2015	9.3%
20	"Ang Kasal" (The Wedding)	Katrina has a big surprise for Alfonso.	#AILYSTheWedding	January 1, 2016	10.2%
21	"Sumalangit na si Michelle" (RIP Michelle)	Katrina makes sure Michelle and Alfonso feel her objection as she gives out unwanted surprises to the couple as part of her revenge.	#AILYSRIPMichelle	January 4, 2016	10.8%
22	"Aalis sa Bahay si Joanna" (Joanna Leaving Home)	The doctor finds traces of ecstasy in Joanna's blood and everyone thinks that Trixie is the one responsible.	#AILYSJoannaLeavingHome	January 5, 2016	8.9%
23	"Di Gustong Bisita" (Unwelcomed Guest)	Michelle and Joanna move in with Alfonso and Trixie, but the latter does not seem pleased.	#AILYSUnwelcomedGuest	January 6, 2016	10.0%
24	"Nasa Panganib si Trixie" (Trixie in Danger)	Trixies grows more and more jealous of her stepmother.	#AILYSTrixieInDanger	January 7, 2016	10.3%
25	"Parating Na Si Katrina" (Katrina Is Coming)	Michelle saves Trixie's life, which opens a way for a better relationship of the two.	#AILYSKatrinaIsComing	January 8, 2016	10.8%
26	"Sorpresa Ni Katrina" (Katrina's Surprise)	Katrina is back. Thus, the rivalry with Michelle begins again.	#AILYSKatrinasSurprise	January 11, 2016	12.3%
27	"Iskandalo sa Debut" (The Debut Scandals)	Katrina will not back down as she faces Michelle and Alfonso.	#AILYSTheDebutScandals	January 12, 2016	11.0%
28	"Eto Na Si Katrina" (Here Comes Katrina)	And the battle begins - Mrs. Valdez (Dimples Romana) vs. Mrs. Valdez (Angel Aquino).	#AILYSHereComesKatrina	January 13, 2016	11.2%
29	"Si Katrina at ang Totoo" (Katrina And Her Truth)	This is the chance that Katrina has been waiting for. Can Trixie ever forgive her for this?	#AILYSKatrinaAndHerTruth	January 14, 2016	11.1%
30	"Ang Malaking Pagbunyag" (The Big Reveal)	Trixie opens her heart for Katrina.	#AILYSTheBigReveal	January 15, 2016	10.4%
31	"Ang Madilim na Sekreto" (The Dark Secret)	Alfonso faces Katrina after discovering the painful truth about Trixie.	#AILYSTheDarkSecret	January 18, 2016	11.1%
32	Nasa Panganib (In Danger)	Alfonso faces the revelation that Trixie is not his daughter.	#AILYSInDanger	January 19, 2016	9.9%
33	Ang Karaniwang Suspek (The Usual Suspects)	Fear creeps into Katrina as Alfonso regains consciousness.	#AILYSTheUsualSuspects	January 20, 2016	10.1%
34	Dalawang Asawa (Two Wives)	The battle of the Valdez wives intensifies now that Alfonso is gone. How can this change the relationship of Trixie and Joanna?	#AILYSTwoWives	January 21, 2016	10.3%
35	Ang Hindi Kanais-Nais Na Tao (The Intruder)	Michelle thinks it's best if Joey stays with them, which Trixie isn't so happy about.	#AILYSTheIntruder	January 22, 2016	9.0%
36	"Nakatagong Motibo" (Ulterior Motives)	The Valdez battle for love and money begins.	#AILYSUlteriorMotives	January 25, 2016	10.1%
37	"Hindi Inaasahang Resulta" (Unexpected Results)	Katrina and Dexter have a olan that will kick Michelle and Joanna out of Alfonso's house.	#AILYSUnexpectedResults	January 26, 2016	9.2%
38	"Anak Sa Labas" (The Illegitimate Daughter)	Michelle and Joanna are about to face the most painful stage of their battle.	#AILYSTheIllegitimateDaughter	January 27, 2016	10.2%
39	"Mabuhay o Umalis?" (Live or Leave?)	Everything is now working as planned by Katrina and she can't wait to get her hands on Alfonso's company.	#AILYSLiveOrLeave	January 28, 2016	11.1%
40	"Inulit ng Nakaraan ang Sarili" (History Repeats Itself)	For Katrina, everything is now working as planned.	#AILYSHistoryRepeatsItself	January 29, 2016	11.7%
41	"Pagtakpan" (The Cover Up)	Trixie is now mean as her mother.	#AILYSTheCoverUp	February 1, 2016	11.7%
42	"Kung Ano Ang Puno, Yun Din ang Bunga." (Like Mother Like Daughter)	Katrina makes sure that Joanna will be the one to get suspended because of her fight with Trixie by paying the dean.	#AILYSLikeMotherLikeDaughter	February 2, 2016	11.1%
43	"Suspendido" (Suspended)	A special connection between Joanna and Justin starts to bloom, while Trixie is suffering from the loss of their father. Trixie was also the one who got suspended.	#AILYSSuspended	February 3, 2016	11.1%
44	"Madulas Kapag Basa" (Slippery When Wet)	Katrina's worst nightmare is about to happen as Trixie finds out that Alfonso is not her father.	#AILYSSlipperyWhenWet	February 4, 2016	11.5%
45	"Tapusin Siya" (Terminate Her)	Will Joey and Michelle be able to figure out who's behind Joanna's slippery ordeal?	#AILYSTerminateHer	February 5, 2016	11.9%
46	"Lahat ng Tungkol kay Dexter" (Everything about Dexter)	Joey is trying to find a connection between Dexter and the unfortunate events of his family. He has to find Dra. Peralta before the situation gets out of hand.	#AILYSEverythingAboutDexter	February 8, 2016	11.7%
47	"Ang Hinala ni Trixie" (Trixie's Suspicion)	Katrina will lose Trixie if her daughter proves she is having an affair with Dexter.	#AILYSTrixiesSuspicion	February 9, 2016	11.5%
48	"Ang Paglabas na Plano ni Katrina" (Katrina's Exit Plan)	Trixie uses social media to ruin Joanna.	#AILYSKatrinasExitPlan	February 10, 2016	11.1%
49	"Hinamon ni Joanna si Trixie" (Joanna Dares Trixie)	Joanna challenges Trixie to have another DNA test.	#AILYSJoannaDaresTrixies	February 11, 2016	13.0%
50	"Hindi Tumugma" (Mismatched)	Joanna was lucky to get a DNA samples from Trixie, now Michelle and Joey can't wait for the truth to come out.	#AILYSMismatched	February 12, 2016	11.3%
51	"Sino Ang Totoo Kong Tatay" (Who Is My Real Father)	A shocking revelation is about to change Trixie's life.	#AILYSWhoIsMyRealFather	February 15, 2016	11.9%
52	"Ang Pag-amin ng Pagmamahal ni Trixie" (Trixie's Love Confession)	Unsure of who her real father is, Trixie falls into a drinking spree and reveal her true feeling for Justin.	#AILYSTrixiesLoveConfession	February 16, 2016	12.0%
53	"Simula na ng Paghahanap" (The Search Begins)	Will Joey discover what Katrina and Dexter are up to?	#AILYSTheSearchBegins	February 17, 2016	12.0%
54	"Hinahanap ang Ugat" (Tracing The Roots)	Trixie is really close in discovering who her real father is.	#AILYSTracingTheRoots	February 18, 2016	12.1%
55	"Kasinungalingan ang Buhay Ko" (My Life Is A Lie)	Trixie gets clue on who her real father is.	#AILYSMyLifeIsALie	February 19, 2016	12.4%
56	"Wala Nang Kasinungalingan" (No More Lies)	Trixie goes in search for the real identity of her father.	#AILYSNoMoreLies	February 22, 2016	12.0%
57	"Harapin Ang Katotohanan" (Face The Truth)	Katrina continues to hurt Joanna and Michelle with more lies.	#AILYSFaceTheTruth	February 23, 2016	11.6%
58	"Nakita At Nahuli" (Spotted and Caught)	Katrina and Dexter's connection has been discovered, but the truth will put Joey's life in danger.	#AILYSSpottedAndCaught	February 24, 2016	11.0%
59	"Ang Ampon" (The Adopted Son)	The Ramirezes face an uphill battle as Katrina continues to find ways to ruin their lives.	#AILYSTheAdoptedSon	February 25, 2016	12.3%
60	"Ang Mapanganib na Koneksyon" (The Dangerous Connection)	Katrina and Maureen become Dexter's tools in getting money from Señor Andres Jimenez.	#AILYSTheDangerousConnection	February 26, 2016	11.6%
61	"Malapit Na Sa Huli" (Nearing the Finish Line)	Señor Andres insists that Michelle work for him again as he fears that Katrina has evil plans that could ruin his company.	#AILYSNearingTheFinishLine	February 29, 2016	11.2%
62	"Ulat ng Pulis" (Police Report)	Joey investigates on the real identity of Dexter.	#AILYSPoliceReport	March 1, 2016	11.1%
63	"Nagpapasimula ng Sunog" (Fire Starter)	Dexter finds a way to keep Joey silent.	#AILYSFireStarter	March 2, 2016	10.9%
64	"Nalinlang" (Deception)	Just when she thought that Joanna has already given up, Trixie receives a shocking news about Joanna and her family, and she know her mom has something to do with it.	#AILYSDeception	March 3, 2016	13.1%
65	"Ang Pakikipagsabwatan" (The Connivance)	Michelle and Joey have already figured out what Katrina is up to, but the latter is all set to run and hide together with Trixie.	#AILYSTheConnivance	March 4, 2016	12.5%
66	"Totoong Pagtatapat" (True Confessions)	Michelle tells Trixie who Dexter really is.	#AILYSTrueConfessions	March 7, 2016	11.9%
67	"Ang Pagsisisi ni Trixie" (Trixie's Repentance)	Dexter figures out what Katrina has been keeping the money that they stole from Señor Andres.	#AILYSTrixiesRepentance	March 8, 2016	14.3%
68	"Armado at Mapanganib" (Armed and Dangerous)	As soon as Dexter discovers Katrina's plans of getting even with him, Dexter abducts Trixie and tries to kill her.	#AILYSArmedAndDangerous	March 9, 2016	13.8%
69	"Pagbabago ng Buhay" (Renewal of Ties)	Joanna and Trixie face their new lives, where they set aside their rivalry and let forgiveness prevail.	#AILYSRenewalOfTies	March 10, 2016	12.3%
70	"Hanggang sa Huli" (Til The End)	It's not yet over for Dexter. Can Joanna and Trixie save each other from the enemy's evil plans?	#AILYSTilTheEnd	March 11, 2016	14.9%
