= Expensive Candy =

2022 Filipino romance film

- Promotional poster
- Directed by: Jason Paul Laxamana
- Screenplay by: Jason Paul Laxamana
- Story by: Jason Paul Laxamana
- Produced by: Vicente del Rosario III; Vic del Rosario Jr.; Veronique del Rosario-Corpus
- Starring: Julia Barretto; Carlo Aquino
- Cinematography: Marvin Reyes
- Edited by: Mai Calapardo
- Music by: Paulo Protacio
- Production company: Viva Films
- Distributed by: Viva Films
- Release date: September 14, 2022
- Running time: 104 minutes
- Country: Philippines
- Language: Filipino

Expensive Candy is a 2022 Philippine romantic drama film directed by Jason Paul Laxamana and produced by Viva Films, starring Julia Barretto and Carlo Aquino. It marked Barretto's first venture into the sexy genre, which was given an R-13 rating by the MTRCB.

== Plot ==
The story follows around finding love in the most unlikely of places and risking everything to pursue it. High school teacher Renato "Toto" Camaya and prostitute Candy spend a night together and fall in love at first sight.

Toto is determined to win her love and spend as much time with her as he can, even if it means exerting effort or buying her time. Toto is a modest man who leads a simple life. His one and only desire is to be with Candy, and he will stop at nothing to make that happen. Candy, however, has other ideas and doesn't want to be in a committed relationship with Toto.

== Cast ==
Lead cast

- Julia Barretto as Candy: a sex worker and Toto's love interest.
- Carlo Aquino as Renato "Toto" Camaya: a respected high school teacher who fell in love with Candy.

Supporting cast

- Francis Magundayao as Gopez
- Andre Yllana as Wiggie
- Ashley Diaz as Letlet
- Bob Jbeili as Ben
- Denise Esteban as Bar Girl
- Quinn Carrillo as Angie
- Ivan Padilla as Justinian
- AJ Muhlach as TJ
- Keagan de Jesus as Olan
- Aurora Sevilla as Ruth
- Marissa Sanchez as Manay Ritz
- Marnie Lapus as Yolly
- Jobelyn Manuel as Ivy
- Taneo Sebastian as Leung
- Ralph Joseph Lim as Tulabot

== Production ==
Jason Paul Laxamana the director of the film said that the storyline for Expensive Candy has been existing since 2015 but was shelved (up until 2022) because it was declined by companies and producers. When Barretto transferred to Viva Films, Laxamana was told that she was in search for a project that would require her to level up as an actress. He then recalled the storyline he crafted a few years back and presented it to Barretto. On November 30, 2021, Laxamana announced in his Instagram account that the film is in the works and is slated for release the following year.

== Release ==
=== Theatrical run ===
Expensive Candy premiered on theatres in September 14, 2022. The press conference of the film occurred last August 31, 2022 while the red carpet premiere took place at The Block Cinema of SM North Edsa on September 5, 2022.

== Reception ==
=== Box office ===
Expensive Candy had a domestic opening of ₱1.2 million and earned ₱1.05 million the following day.

=== Audience viewership ===
Expensive Candy was well-received on Amazon Prime Video, becoming one of the most watched movies in the Philippines.

=== Critical response ===
Manila Bulletin gave the film a positive review, calling it: "alternately entertaining and moving". They also noted and praised Aquino's powerful presence throughout the film, also calling Barretto's performance beautiful and illuminating. Fred Hawson of ABS-CBN News also gave the film a stunning score of 7/10, emphasizing Barretto's stellar performance a level-up from her previous works. Film Circle Reject gave an overall mixed review, stating that "overall, it's just... okay. For fans of Laxamana like me, it's simply nice to see him back working on the genre. But admittedly, this is not his strongest work."

== Accolades ==
Year	Category	Award Giving Body	Result	Ref
2023	Most Outstanding Film Actress	5th Gawad Lasallianeta Awards	Won	
