= Maharani (song) =

- Official single cover

Single by Alamat

from the EP Pasulong
- Language: Tagalog
- English title: Great Queen
- Released: January 24, 2023
- Genre: Contemporary R&B; trap; neo-soul; Pinoy pop
- Length: 3:30
- Label: Viva
- Composer: Thyro Alfaro
- Producer: Thyro Alfaro

Alamat singles chronology
| "Aswang" (2023) | "Maharani" (2023) | "Gayuma" (2023) |

Music video
- "Maharani" on YouTube

"Maharani" (transl. Great Queen) is a song by the Filipino boy band Alamat. It is the second track from their first extended play (EP) Pasulong (transl. Forward), released on October 28, 2022. "Maharani" was released as a single on January 24, 2023, along with a music video starring Jhoanna Robles as Alamat member Taneo Sebastian's love interest. Filmmaker Jason Paul Laxamana directed the video.

Lyrically, "Maharani" is about unrequited love, particularly from the perspective of an admirer pining for a girl who is stuck in a loveless relationship with someone else. Its lyrics are written in Tagalog, although its title is a Sanskrit word referring to the wife of a maharaja (the Hindu equivalent of a prince or king). Musically, it blends elements of traditional Southern Philippine music with the R&B, trap, and neo-soul genres. It also incorporates native Southeast Asian instruments such as the kanun, gamelan, and gangsa. Thyro Alfaro wrote, composed, and produced "Maharani". Zebedee Zuñiga is credited for vocal arrangement and Ponz Martinez is credited for recording the song.

The single received highly favorable reviews from critics. Nica Glorioso of Nylon Manila described "Maharani" as the benchmark for Alamat's concept and sound. In November 2023, "Maharani" won Best R&B Recording at the 36th Awit Awards. In July 2024, the song entered Billboard Philippines' Hot 100 chart, peaking at number 80. A report by the publication stated that Alamat was the only Pinoy pop boy band to enter their charts at the time it was written.

== Background and release ==
Following nine months of training, the boy band Alamat officially debuted on February 14, 2021, with the single "Kbye". Released by Viva Records, "Kbye" was notable for using seven Philippine languages: Tagalog, Ilocano, Kapampangan, Bicolano, Waray, Hiligaynon, and Cebuano (Bisaya), which the members spoke natively. The group released more singles throughout 2021 and early 2022, such as, "Kasmala", "Porque" (transl. Why), and "ABKD". (Note: The title is read as "ah bah kah dah". These are the first four letters of the modern Filipino alphabet.) Throughout this period, members Kin (Tagalog), Valfer (Hiligaynon), and Gami (Bisaya) left Alamat, who then continued as a six-member group.

In July 2022, Alamat released the first pre-release single for their debut extended play (EP), Pasulong (transl. Forward), "Say U Love Me", an R&B track. On August 23, they released another pre-release single titled "ILY ILY", (Note: The title uses "ILY" as an abbreviation for "I love you" but also references the Hiligaynon lullaby "Ili-ili".) a multilingual track exploring the sadness of Overseas Filipino Workers' children. Apart from the group's usual languages, the track included a verse from the Hiligaynon lullaby "Ili-ili" (transl. lull to sleep) and featured vocals from Lyca Gairanod. Viva Records released Pasulong on all digital streaming platforms on October 28, alongside its lead single, "Aswang". (Note: The word "aswang" is an umbrella term for malevolent shapeshifting creatures in Philippine mythology, particularly Visayan mythology. The song's official music video simply uses the generic translation "monster" for the word.) On January 24, 2023, they released "Maharani" as the next single from the EP.

== Composition and lyrics ==
"Maharani"
An 18-second sample of "Maharani", where the chorus can be heard.

"Maharani" is an R&B, trap, and neo-soul song that incorporates indigenous Southeast Asian instruments such as the kanun, gamelan, and gangsa. The song is about unrequited love, according to Alamat member Taneo Sebastian. Specifically, the lyrics are from the perspective of an admirer who hopes to save a girl from her loveless relationship with somebody else. According to its songwriter, producer, and composer Thyro Alfaro, the song's wooden sounds and beats were inspired by the singkil, which is a traditional Maranao dance that utilizes bamboo.

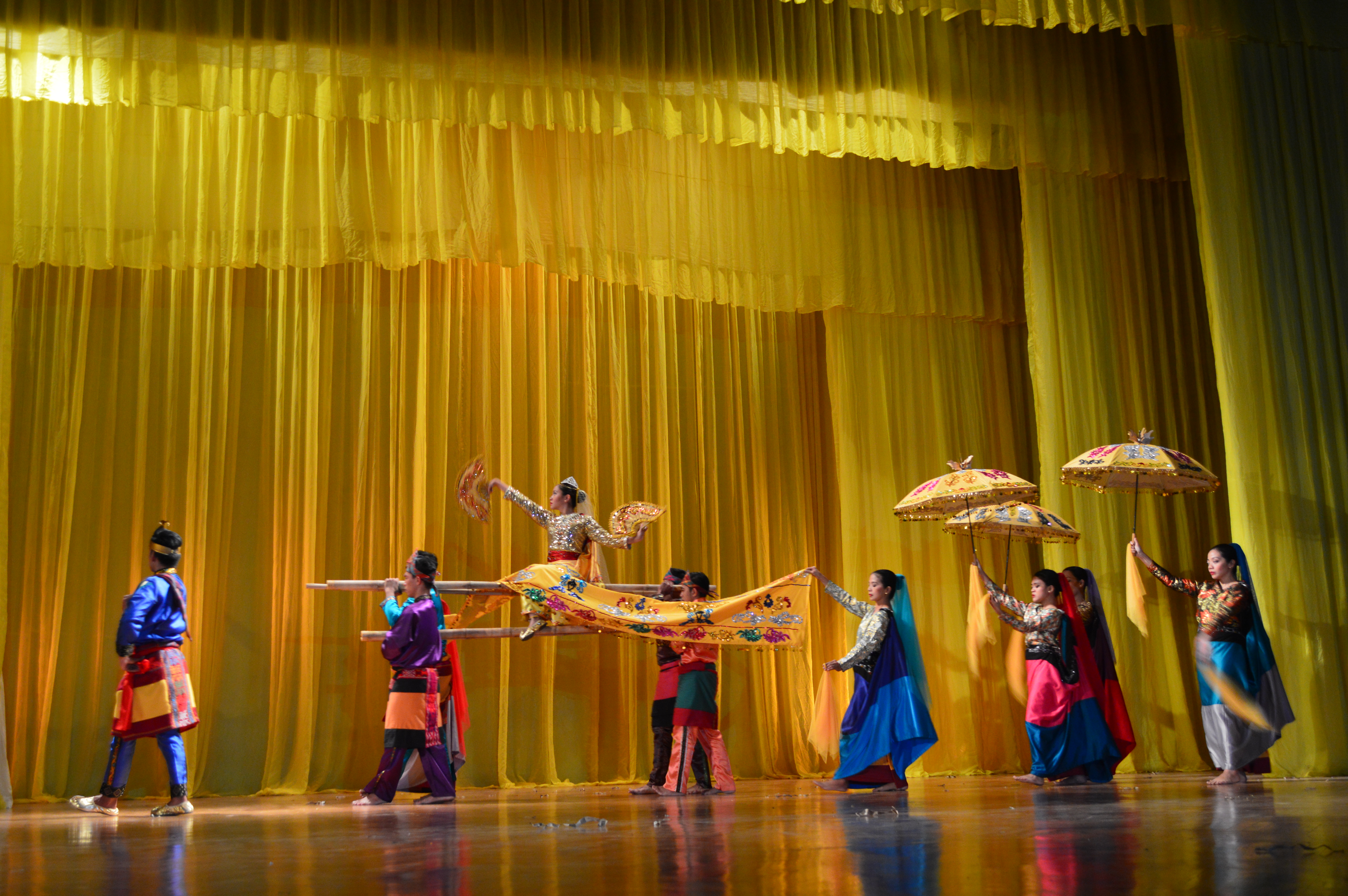
The singkil dance of the Maranao people inspired the lyrics and music video of "Maharani"

Alfaro built the song lyrically and musically around the "melodious" and "pleasant" title, which is a Sanskrit word that simply translates to "great queen" and refers to the wife of a maharaja (the Hindu equivalent of a prince or king). Alfaro further explained that in the lyrics, he sought to reverse the roles in the singkil, a dance often performed by women. Instead of women dancing for the approval of a king, the men dance and seek the attention of a queen.

== Reception ==
In a track-by-track review of Pasulong published on November 10, 2022, Renzneil Robles of Village Pipol named "Maharani" as a standout love song. Acer Batislaong of Nylon Manila wrote that the track had irresistible beats, concluding that it was a "gem" and a welcome addition to Alamat's "already impressive and rich" oeuvre. In May 2024, Nica Glorioso of Nylon Manila declared "Maharani" to be the benchmark for the group's sound and concept, describing it as "deliciously modern" and "distinctly Filipino." On August 2, Tatler Asia included Alamat in their list of 26 music acts who were "among the best and brightest in the [Philippines]". According to Tatler writers Jessica Zapata and Angela Nicole Guiral, the group's "unique" musical style was most apparent in "Maharani".

On November 9, 2023, Alamat earned their first-ever Awit Award when "Maharani" won Best R&B Recording at the 36th Awit Awards ceremony. In the following year, Glorioso described "Maharani" as "a career-defining drop", noting that it was Alamat's most widely streamed song and "arguably the most successful". "Maharani" debuted on Billboard Philippines' inaugural Hot 100 chart in the week of July 6, 2024, at number 80, making Alamat the first Pinoy pop boy band to enter that chart.

== Music video ==
Lead cast

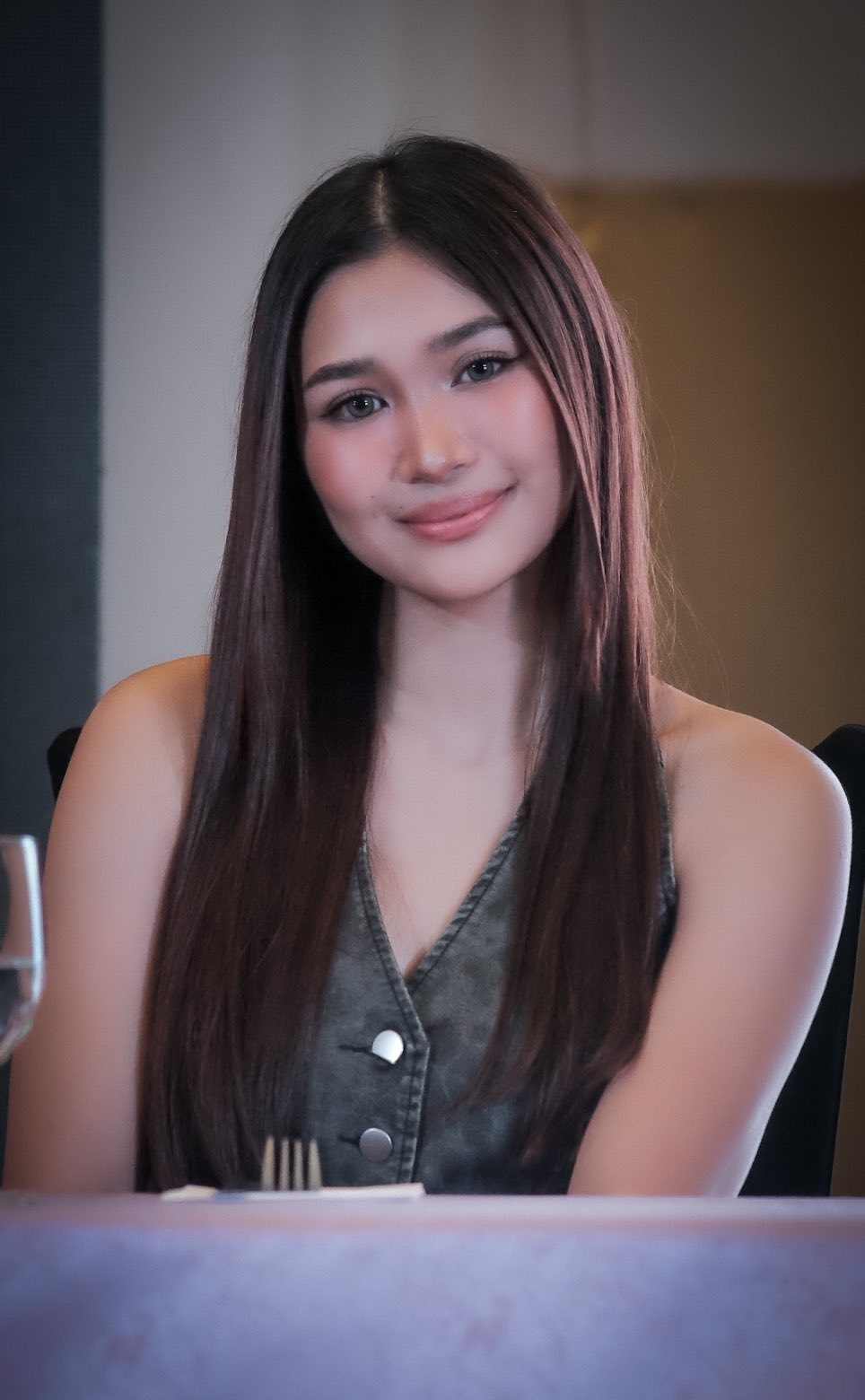
Jhoanna

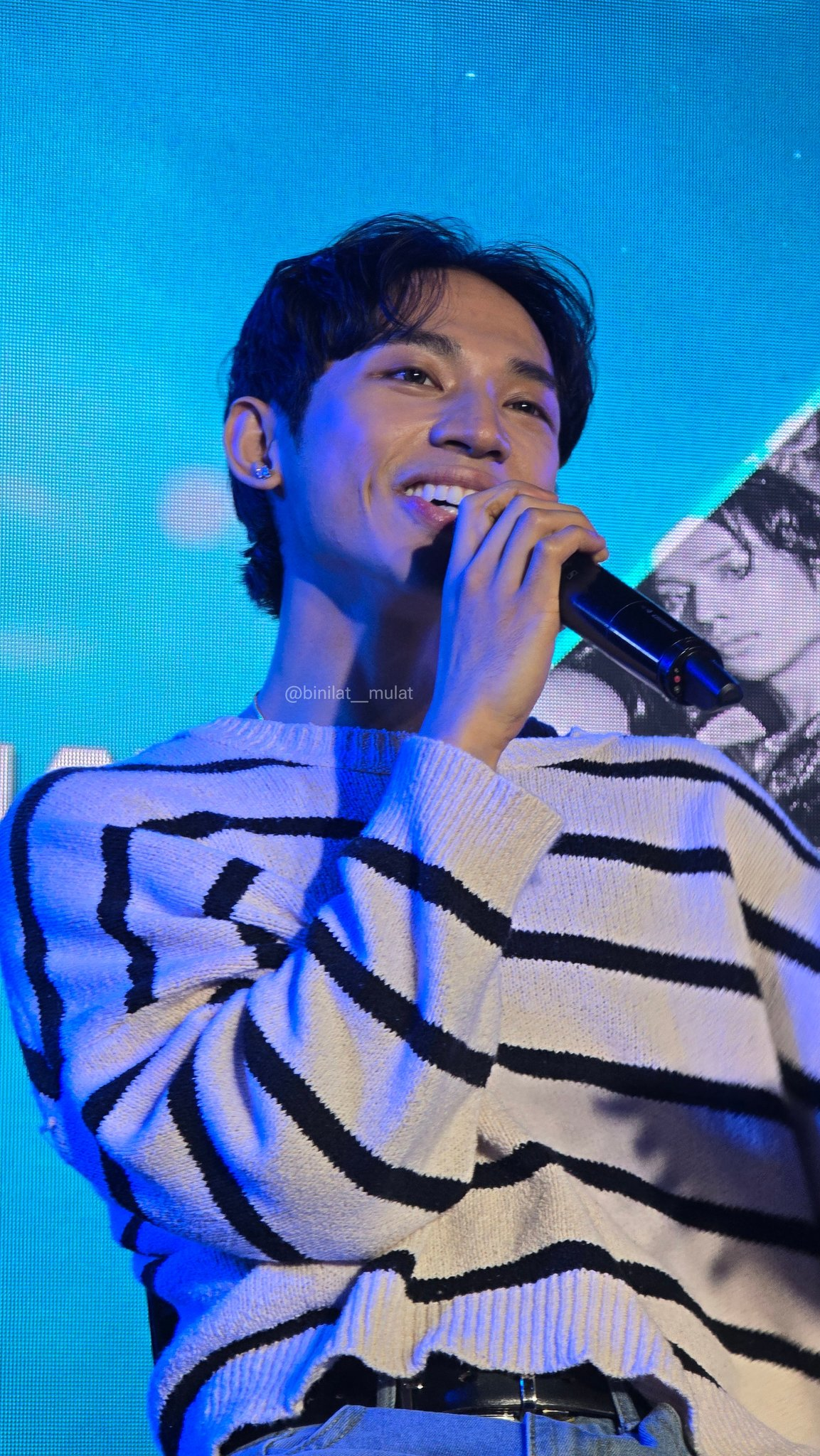
Taneo

Filipino filmmaker Jason Paul Laxamana directed the music video for "Maharani". It stars the members of Alamat, as well as actress and Bini member Jhoanna Robles, as classmates rehearsing for a singkil performance in school. In the performance, Robles plays Princess Gandingan and Alamat member Taneo Sebastian plays Prince Bantugan, the main characters of the Maranao epic poem portrayed in singkil performances, Darangen (transl. that which is narrated by song or chant). As they continue to practice the dance, a spark grows between the two. Nylon Manila's Rafael Bautista remarked that "it felt correct seeing them as the lead couple of the video", pointing out that Robles and Sebastian are both the official leaders of their respective pop groups.

Robles and Sebastian learned how to perform singkil for the music video. Alamat's choreographer Jim Amen and his team decided to incorporate three additional Philippine courtship dances in the song's choreography: takik (a love, flirting, and wedding dance of the Western Mountain Province tribes); pangalay (a ceremonial dance of the Tausūg people); and beneracion (a romantic folk dance from Capiz). The video also shows the members of Alamat dancing the tinikling with Robles and features the Viva talent Migo Valid as her "bad boyfriend." The clothing items worn by the Alamat members in various scenes include neckties with embroidered designs from Marawi and golden outfits.

== Other media ==
On August 25, 2023, Alamat performed "Maharani" at the FIBA Basketball World Cup. At Billboard Philippines' first anniversary celebration on October 15, 2024, Alamat performed a medley of their songs "Maharani" and "Day and Night". Mayks Go reported that the tracks "effortlessly got those in attendance to cheer, move, and sing along from start to finish", in a feature for the magazine.

In 2023, the choreography of "Maharani" became a dance trend on TikTok. In 2024, "Maharani" became a trend on the app again; numerous viral "transition" videos such as makeup transformations used a snippet of the song. Kelsey Telo of Interaksyon noted that the "smooth but climactic" rhythm of its chorus gave TikTok content creators a "perfect" transition sound. The Five Stages of Courting Dalisay Ramos, a 2024 romance novel by the Filipino-American author Melissa de la Cruz, also mentions the song.

== Credits and personnel ==
Credits are adapted from official listings on YouTube.

- Alamat – vocals
- Thyro Alfaro – composing, producing, arranging, mixing, mastering
- Zebedee Zuñiga – vocal arrangement
- Ponz Martinez – recording

== Accolades ==
| Award | Year | Category | Nominee(s) | Result | Ref. |
|---|---|---|---|---|---|
| 36th Awit Awards | 2023 | Best R&B Recording | "Maharani" | Won | |

== Charts ==
=== Weekly charts ===
| Chart (2024) | Peak position |
|---|---|
| Philippines (Philippines Hot 100) | 80 |
