= Taneo Sebastian =

Filipino actor, model and singer (born 2000)

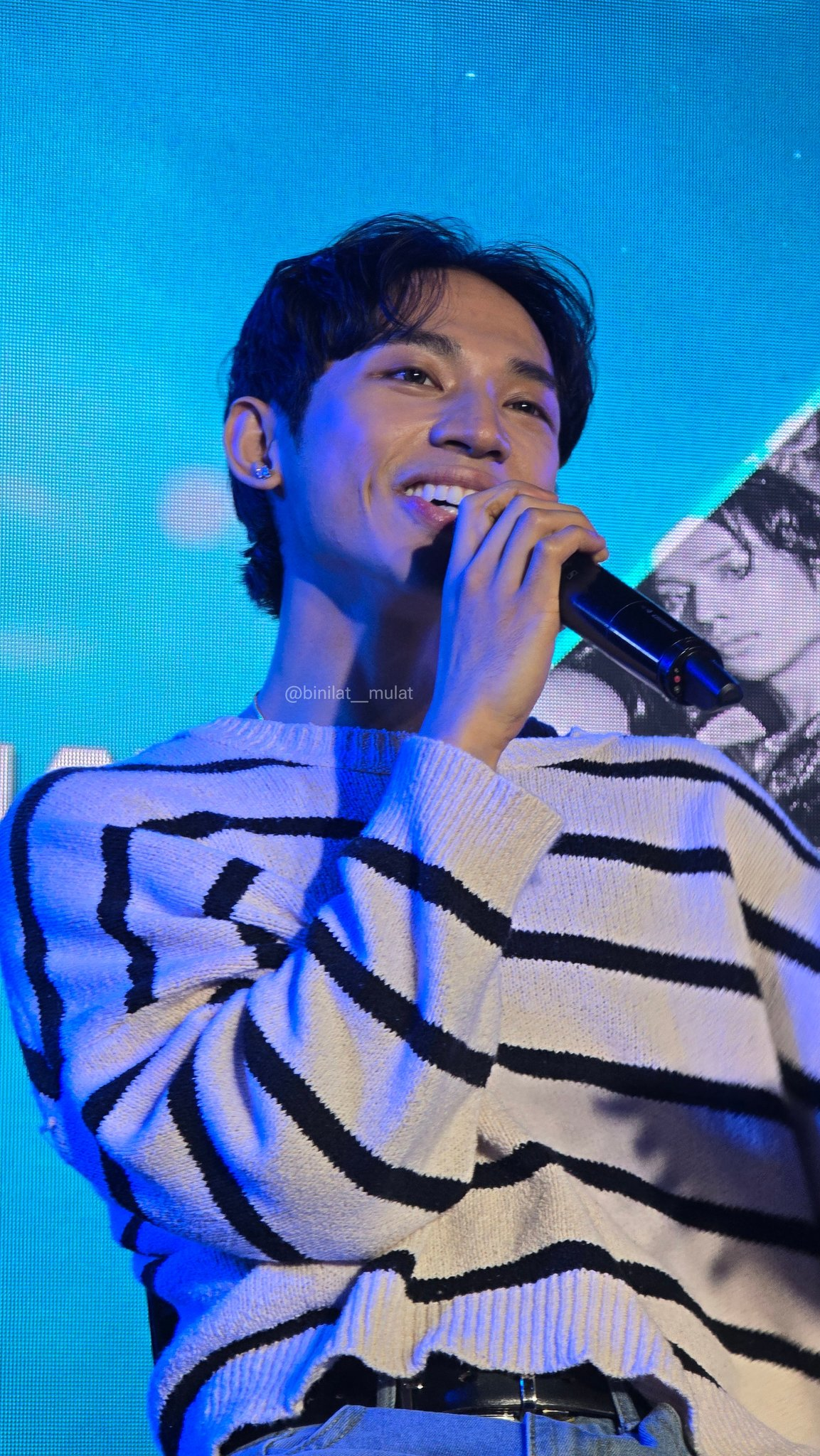
- Sebastian in February 2025
- Born: Brylle Jordan Sebastian Uyam; May 31, 2000 (age 26)
- Education: University of South Florida
- Occupations: Actor; singer; dancer; model
- Years active: 2020–present
- Musical career
- Genre: P-pop
- Label: Viva
- Member of: Alamat

Brylle Jordan Sebastian Uyam (born May 31, 2000), known by his stage name Taneo and professionally credited as Taneo Sebastian, is a Filipino-American actor, singer, dancer, and model. On February 14, 2021, he debuted as the leader of the Philippine boy band Alamat. Their debut song "Kbye" peaked at number two on Billboard's Next Big Sound rankings, making Alamat the second P-pop group to ever enter the American chart.

Sebastian made his film debut in 2022, as troublemaker student Leung in the film Expensive Candy. He also played the role of Joey in Marita (2023), a horror film about a theater troupe that is being haunted by a ghost, and appeared in the 2024 romance drama film Ikaw Pa Rin Ang Pipiliin Ko (transl. I'll Still Choose You). He is set to portray Ryosuke Sato in the second season of Ang Mutya ng Section E (transl. The Jewel of Section E). In September 2026, Sebastian was cast as Toma in the film Hum, his first starring role.

== Early life and education ==
Brylle Jordan Sebastian Uyam was born on May 31, 2000. His family is from Tabuk, Kalinga. He grew up in the United States and graduated from the University of South Florida with a degree in accountancy. He is of Ilocano and Kalinga descent.

== Career ==
=== 2020-present: Joining Alamat, acting, modeling ===
Sebastian auditioned for Viva Records' new boy band project in 2020. The members underwent intensive training for nine months, which encompassed singing, dancing, physical fitness, and personality development. Their training also included acting workshops. On February 14, 2021, Sebastian was among the nine members who debuted as Alamat (transl. Legend), with the multilingual song "Kbye", which had lyrics in the Philippine languages Bikolano, Cebuano, Hiligaynon, Ilocano, Kapampangan, Tagalog, and Waray-Waray. Sebastian was appointed as the leader of the group. A few weeks after "Kbye" was released, Alamat became the second P-pop group to make it on Billboard's Next Big Sound chart after SB19, debuting at number two. Publications also regarded them as the fastest-rising Filipino act on the chart.

In March 2022, Sebastian completed Viva Artists Agency's Basic Acting Workshop for Film and TV. He made his film debut in the 2022 romantic drama film Expensive Candy as Leung, one of Toto (Carlo Aquino)'s troublemaker students.

In January 2023, Sebastian starred in the music video for "Maharani", a single by Alamat. In the video, he and the other members of Alamat are classmates rehearsing a singkil performance with their classmate, portrayed by Jhoanna Robles of Bini. Sebastian is Prince Bantugan and Robles is Princess Gandingan, the main couple of the Maranao epic poem usually portrayed in singkil performances, Darangen (transl. that which is narrated by song or chant). As they continue to practice the dance, a spark grows between Sebastian and Robles. Nylon Manila's Rafael Bautista remarked that "it felt correct seeing them as the lead couple of the video", pointing out that Robles and Taneo are both the official leaders of their respective pop groups.

In May, Sebastian posed for the Philippine magazine Parcinq's fashion feature, styled by Bryan Laroza. Hans Ethan Carbonilla wrote that Sebastian's "ethereal sun-kissed glow" perfectly captured the essence of a summer day in the countryside. Sebastian walked the runway at BYS Fashion Week 2023 in October, modeling pieces by Antonina. That year, he also starred as Joey in Marita. It is a horror film inspired by the urban legend of a university theater actress who committed suicide in front of a shocked audience in the 1970s. In the film, she is named Marita. Years after her death, a teacher portrayed by Louise delos Reyes tries to revive the school's theater; Joey is one of the students haunted by the "vicious" ghost of Marita when he joins the new theater troupe. In 2024, Sebastian had a supporting role in the romantic drama film Ikaw Pa Rin Ang Pipiliin Ko (transl. I'll Still Choose You). On August 15, 2025, he was announced as a cast member on Ang Mutya ng Section E (transl. The Jewel of Section E), as Yuri's rival Ryosuke Sato.

In September 2026, Deadline confirmed that Sebastian will star in Hum as Toma, a young cowboy in Benguet. It is his first lead role.

== Filmography ==
=== Television ===
Year	Title	Role	Ref.
2022, 2024	Family Feud	Himself (contestant)	
2025	Ang Mutya ng Section E Season 2	Ryosuke Sato	
2025	Rainbow Rumble	Himself (contestant)	

=== Film ===
Year	Title	Role	Ref.
2022	Expensive Candy	Leung	
2023	Marita	Joey	
2024	Ikaw Pa Rin Ang Pipiliin Ko	Gary	
TBA	Hum	Toma	

=== Music videos ===
Year	Title	Artist	Director	Ref.
2023	"Maharani"	Alamat	Jason Paul Laxamana	
