= Vince and Kath =

Romantic series by Jenny Ruth Almocera

- The first original image screenshot of Vince and Kath story
- Author: Jenny Ruth Almocera
- Genre: Romance
- Publisher: Independent
- Publication date: 2 January 2016; 10 years ago
- Publication place: Philippines
- Media type: Digital images

Vince and Kath is an online romantic series written by Filipino author Jenny Ruth Almocera. The story consists of screenshots of SMS and chat conversations between the characters with few narrative sections. Each album consists of chapters of the story. Similar to Kiko Laxa Ferrer's authors on Kikodora Social Serye fan page. After its debut release on January 2, 2016 on Life and Social Media fan page, it became popular on social media. Due to its success, the book version is released under ABS-CBN Publishing Incorporated. The series was ended on May 17, 2016 with a total of 24 chapters (37 parts).

The series was serialized into a motion picture entitled Vince and Kath and James, which was released on December 25, 2016 as a 2016 Metro Manila Film Festival entry.

== Background ==
The story was conceived when Almocera read her old text messages in her cellphone. She wrote it by simulating a conversation through Yazzy app, an app that creates fake conversations. The story has also some references to her life experiences especially her college life. The two main characters are loosely based on real people, where Kath refers to the author herself and Vince refers to her husband.

== Plot ==
The story revolves around a young man named Vince who bravely sends a text message to his crush, Kath. Until they become text mates and become in-relationship status. As they graduate from college, Vince proposes to Kath. They face different life challenges especially when Vince is stabbed by hooligans and knocks his head off from which he suffers amnesia due to a head trauma. Kath makes difficult efforts to help Vince regain his memories. Suddenly Kath's aunt reveals that her father is very ill. At the same time, Vince is rushed to the hospital unexpectedly after Kath finds out that he has been unconscious in his house. She calls her friend Maxine to look after Vince in the hospital while she's away to visit her father in Dubai urgently. After a few days Vince miraculously recovers from his amnesia. He prepares a surprise for Kath. When Kath arrives from Dubai, she is shocked about Vince's recovery. And Vince proposes to Kath again. He promises her that he would bring back what he lost and pay gratitude for her sacrifices.

Later Vince finds out that Jella's boyfriend Nathan was the perpetrator; Nathan stabbed Vince due to jealousy. Vince confronts Nathan and brawls at each other. The feud is stopped by Jella. Vince initially decided to put Nathan into jail but recanted his decision because Jella told him that she is pregnant with Nathan's child. This triggers Kath's agony on Vince but their love quarrel is short-lived.

As they prepare for their wedding, Kath's former suitor and also Vince's best friend James arrives in their lives. James still has feelings for Kath. He was supposed to help for the wedding however Vince was upset when he found out about James' feelings for Kath so he confronted James in a fistfight. Afterwards, Vince and James decide to end the conflict for the sake of their friendship, and Vince disappears mysteriously. Kath tries to contact Vince and asks his friends but no one knows where he is. She had no choice but to go outside and find Vince. After long hours of pursuit, she finds Vince inside a chapel. Kath hugs him tightly and they talk to each other. Vince waits for a sign and makes a final decision to marry Kath. When Vince and Kath became husband and wife, their text message conversation ends.

== Characters ==
- Vince - A middle-class man who had a crush on and fell in love with Kath. He was an electrical engineering student and a varsity player in his college years.
- Kath - Vince's crush and schoolmate. A mechanical engineering student during her college years. She likes to eat and join campus events. Later on she became Vince's girlfriend and fiancée.
- Jake - Kath's best friend. He also had feelings for Kath but he was rejected.
- Jella - Vince's officemate. Cousin of Vince's friend.
- Maxine - Kath's best friend.
- Kath's father - An overseas worker in Dubai, United Arab Emirates. He also has a business in the Philippines.
- Tita Girly - Kath's aunt in Dubai, United Arab Emirates.
- Weng - Kath's cousin. Son of Tita Girly.
- Ayen, Marty, Bryan, Doms, Nana, and Joven - Vince and Kath's friends.
- Rika - Vince and Kath's wedding organizer.
- Vince's mother - A perfectionist parent.
- Nathan - Jella's boyfriend. Vince's perpetrator.
- Marco - Jella's cousin.
- James - Vince's best friend and Kath's former suitor.
- Akira - Maxine's friend.

== Chapter list (Online version) ==
Chapter No.	Chapter Title	Part No.
1	Crush	1-4
2	Us	5-7
3	Still	8
4	Again	9
5	What Now?	10
6	You	11
7	Hang in There	12
8	Remember	13
9	Heart	14
10	Promise	15
11	Sorry	16
12	Almost	17
13	My Stalker	18-19
14	Walang Titibag	20
15	Cheer & Var	21-24
16	Mother Knows Best?	25
17	#VinceAndKath <3	26-27
18	Will they survive this relationship?	28-30
19	(No chapter title)	31-32
20	The Confession	33
21	The Flashback	34
22	The Confrontation	35
23	Where is Vince?	36
24	The End	37

== Critical reception ==
The Vince and Kath story spread through social networking sites such as Facebook, Twitter, and Instagram. Almocera has been contacted by independent film makers to discuss a possible movie based on the story. While some readers thought that Vince and Kath was a true story, Almocera initially claimed that it is purely fictional; however, she later stated that the characters and some of the plot is based on her own memories and past experiences. Some readers have referred to the story as a modern version of Romeo and Juliet of the Philippines. The story is also featured in I Juander, an investigative documentary produced by GMA News TV and in Rated K, a magazine show produced by ABS-CBN. Because of its popularity many screenshot conversations stories appeared on social media especially on Facebook, which became a new format of story writing in the Philippines called "Textserye" or "SocialSerye". The author also published another stories such as The Wrong Message featuring Ronnie Alonte as the cover model of the book (it is the debut release of the author) and My Love for Dora which is still published online.

== Adaptations ==
Vince and Kath (Book Version)
- Author: Jenny Ruth Almocera
- Country: Philippines
- Language: English and Filipino
- Genre: Romance
- Publisher: ABS-CBN Publishing Incorporated
- Media type: Print
- No. of books: 7

The online series was adapted into a book with the same title and published on May 7, 2016 under ABS-CBN Publishing.

An Android game based from the series was developed and published by Kalaro Games.

The series was also adapted into a film, with Julia Barretto, Joshua Garcia, and Ronnie Alonte playing the roles of Kath, Vince, and James, respectively together with the author appearing as a cameo. The principal photography began in late July 2016. The film is one of the official entries to the 2016 Metro Manila Film Festival directed by Theodore Boborol.
