= Jhoanna =

Filipino actress and singer-dancer (born 2004)

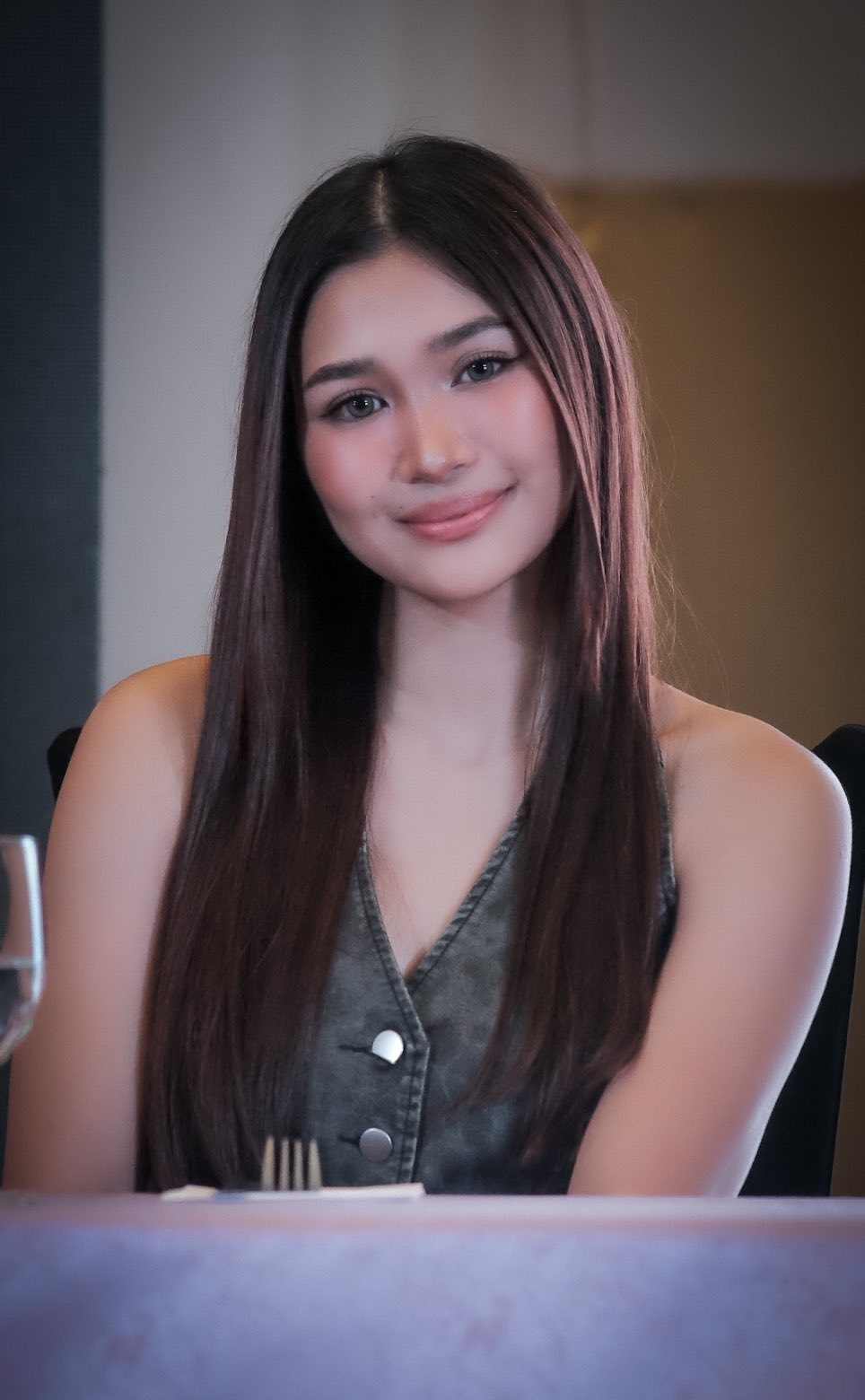
- Jhoanna at the Ibalong Festival in September 2025
- Born: Jhoanna Christine Burgos Robles; January 26, 2004 (age 22); Calamba, Laguna, Philippines
- Occupations: Singer; actress; dancer
- Years active: 2018–present
- Musical career
- Genres: P-pop; bubblegum pop; teen pop; EDM
- Instruments: Vocals
- Label: Star
- Member of: Bini

Jhoanna Christine Burgos Robles (born January 26, 2004), known mononymously as Jhoanna, is a Filipino singer, actress and dancer under Star Music. She is the leader of the Filipino girl group Bini.

From 2018 to 2019, Jhoanna had bit roles in the TV shows Kadenang Ginto (transl. Golden Chain) and Maalaala Mo Kaya (transl. Would You Remember). In 2023, Jhoanna starred in the music video for "Maharani" (transl. Great Queen) by Alamat, portraying a student who forms a romantic bond with her classmate. The following year, she also starred in the music video for "Misteryoso" (transl. Mysterious) by Cup of Joe.

In two separate runs from 2023 to 2024, Jhoanna portrayed Eds, the protagonist of Tabing Ilog the Musical, a theater adaptation of the teen drama Tabing Ilog (transl. Riverside). She alternated the role with Vivoree Esclito and Sheena Belarmino. Jia Pizarro Bote of When in Manila praised Jhoanna's performance, writing that she proved her versatility in the musical.

== Early life and education ==
Jhoanna Christine Burgos Robles was born on January 26, 2004, in Calamba, Laguna, Philippines. She is the only child of her parents. She served as a majorette in her school's marching band and competed in campus journalism competitions in high school as part of her initial plans to become a broadcast journalist. She graduated high school in 2025 from the Japan-Philippines Institute of Technology.

== Career ==
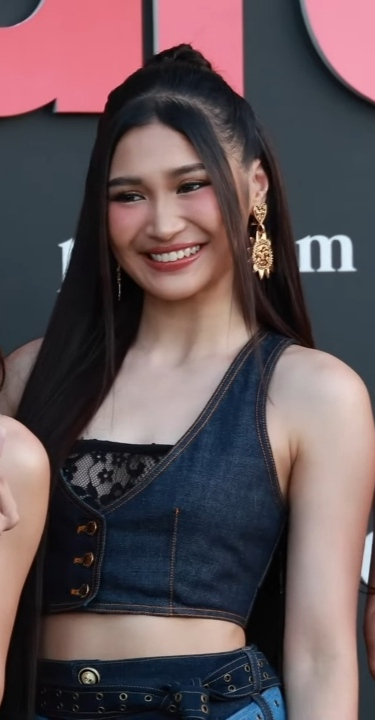
Jhoanna at Billboard K POWER 100 in October 2024

=== 2018–2020: Early career and Star Hunt Academy audition ===
Prior to joining Bini, Jhoanna had bit roles in the soap opera Kadenang Ginto (transl. Golden Chain), where she portrayed the schoolmate of Andrea Brillantes and Francine Diaz' characters Marga and Cassy, as well as the drama anthology series Maalaala Mo Kaya (transl. Would You Remember). In 2018, Jhoanna auditioned for Star Hunt Academy (SHA) in Laguna. On October 10, 2020, Jhoanna was one of the last eight members of the SHA Girl Trainees to graduate and was officially announced as a member of an idol group. In November 2020, Jhoanna officially became a member of the Filipino girl group Bini.

=== 2021–present: Debut with Bini, acting ventures, and expanding music career ===
Jhoanna officially debuted as a member of Bini on June 11, 2021. She is officially the group's leader, in addition to being one of its lead vocalists and rappers. In June 2022, Jhoanna's vocal abilities earned praise from Parcinq's Hans Ethan Carbonilla, who wrote that she had "one of the best voices in P-pop".

In 2023, she starred in the music video for "Maharani" (transl. Great Queen) by the Pinoy pop boy band Alamat. In the video, she and the members of Alamat portray classmates who are rehearsing for a school performance of the singkil traditional dance. As they practice, a spark grows between Jhoanna and the Alamat member Taneo Sebastian. Rafael Bautista of Nylon Manila remarked that "it felt correct" for Jhoanna and Taneo to portray the lead couple, as they are both the official leaders of their respective groups. She learned how to dance singkil for the video.

Later that year, she was cast as Epifania "Eds/Panyang" delos Santos, the female lead of Tabing Ilog the Musical, a role she alternated with Vivoree Esclito and Sheena Belarmino. It is a musical theater adaptation of Tabing Ilog (transl. Riverside), a teen drama series that originally aired from 1999 to 2003. The musical updates the show's story and setting to suit its Gen Z cast and characters. In 2024, she reprised the role, along with Esclito and Belarmino. The rerun lasted from November 8 to December 1. Jia Pizarro Bote of When in Manila lauded Jhoanna's stage performance, writing that she proved her versatility as Eds. The musical is a joint production between the Philippine Educational Theater Association (PETA) and ABS-CBN.

In July, Jhoanna was cast as the love interest in the music video of the single "Misteryoso" (transl. Mysterious) by the Baguio-based pop-rock band Cup of Joe, co-starring band member Gian Bernardino and directed by SB19 member Justin. Ghilieah Valeska Tabbada of Pulp praised the "heart-fluttering" onscreen chemistry between Bernardino and Jhoanna, calling every scene between them "swoon-worthy". Jhoanna was also a featured vocalist on "Kalma Kahit Magulo" (transl. Calm Despite Turmoil), a song from the original soundtrack of the 2024 ABS-CBN drama series High Street, along with fellow Bini member Colet and Juan Karlos Labajo.

In 2025, Jhoanna drew controversy when a video circulated, appearing to show her with two male companions, Ethan David of GAT and dancer Shawn Castro. The clip also featured what fans believed to be the voices of two other Bini members. The two men acted out a sexually suggestive scene. Amid concerns that the men's simulated act involved an underage girl, Castro clarified in his apology that "no minor, or anyone, was hurt physically, mentally, sexually, or in any manner". David and Bini also issued public apologies. On July 31, Jhoanna attended a special screening of Sunshine, a film led by Maris Racal that discusses themes including abortion, reproductive health, and safe sex in the Philippines. After the screening, Robles shared her thoughts, commending the film's focus on mental health and expressing that individuals facing mental challenges may sometimes make decisions based on short-term relief. Her remarks drew mixed reactions online, with some netizens that her comments appeared an overshadow the film's central message and reflected a perceived "pro-life" bias. Robles later issued a public apology via Instagram, acknowledging the concerns. The film director, Antoinette Jadaone, defended Robles, noting that public figures may face limitations when addressing sensitive subjects like abortion.

In January 2026, Jhoanna appeared in the short film The Witness.

== Other ventures ==
=== Journalism ===
While in sixth grade, Jhoanna developed a passion for journalism when she was asked to read a newspaper in her school's library. She then participated through her high school years in the District Schools Press Conference (DSPC) and advanced to the Regional Schools Press Conference (RSPC) in Calabarzon—both of which are qualifiers leading to the National Schools Press Conference (NSPC).

On April 20, 2023, Bini appeared on the morning radio program Sakto on TeleRadyo Serbisyo, where Jhoanna's interest in reporting was noted by hosts Amy Perez and Jeff Canoy. Due to Perez's absence, Jhoanna stood in as a temporary host on April 21, following an offer.

On February 21, 2024, Jhoanna served as a guest presenter on ABS-CBN News' digital-exclusive news rundown TV Patrol Express. On April 15, Jhoanna served as a guest entertainment anchor on ABS-CBN's flagship news program, TV Patrol. She returned as a guest presenter on TV Patrol Express in October. In April 2026, she delivered the weather forecast on Good Day L.A.

=== Philanthropy ===
On October 3, 2026, Jhoanna held a sale of her clothes in Mandaluyong as part of a charity initiative that she launched called The Cinder Project, which is aimed to provide help for local farmers.

== Discography ==
List of singles, showing year released and associated albums
| Title | Year | Album |
|---|---|---|
| "Kalma Kahit Magulo" (with Colet Vergara and Juan Karlos Labajo) | 2024 | High Street Original Soundtrack |

=== Songwriting credits ===
Credits are adapted from Apple Music.

List of singles, showing year released and associated albums
| Title | Year | Artist | Album | Credits |
|---|---|---|---|---|
| "Paruparo" | 2025 | Bini | Flames | Writer |

== Filmography ==
=== Television ===
| Year | Title | Ref. |
|---|---|---|
| 2018–2019 | Kadenang Ginto | |
| 2019 | Maalaala Mo Kaya | |
| 2025 | Pinoy Big Brother: Celebrity Collab Edition | |

=== Film ===
| Year | Title | Ref. |
|---|---|---|
| 2026 | The Witness | |

=== Music videos ===
| Year | Title | Artist | Director | Ref. |
|---|---|---|---|---|
| 2023 | "Maharani" | Alamat | Jason Paul Laxamana | |
| 2024 | "Misteryoso" | Cup of Joe | Justin de Dios | |

=== Theater ===
| Year | Title | Role | Notes | Ref. |
|---|---|---|---|---|
| 2023–2024 | Tabing Ilog the Musical | Epifania "Eds/Panyang" delos Santos | Philippine Educational Theater Association | |

== Awards and nominations ==
| Award | Year | Category | Nominee(s) | Result | Ref. |
|---|---|---|---|---|---|
| P-pop Music Awards | 2023 | Top Female Leader of the Year | Jhoanna | Won | |
| P-pop Music Awards | 2025 | P-pop Favorite Leader of the Year | Jhoanna | Nominated | |
| P-pop Music Awards | 2026 | Leader of the Year | Jhoanna | Won | |
