= Bahay na Pula (film) =

2022 Filipino horror film

Red House
- Official release poster
- Bahay na Pula
- Directed by: Brillante Mendoza
- Based on: Bahay na Pula
- Starring: Julia Barreto, Xian Lim, Marco Gumabao
- Distributed by: VIVA Films
- Release date: February 25, 2022 (Vivamax)
- Running time: 102 minutes
- Country: Philippines
- Language: Filipino

Bahay na Pula (lit. Red House) is a 2022 Filipino horror film directed by Brillante Mendoza, starring Julia Barreto, Xian Lim and Marco Gumabao.

== Synopsis ==
Jane (Julia Barreto) travels with her husband Marco (Xian Lim) to go to Pola, Oriental Mindoro to seek the mayor's approval to demolish Jane's ancestral house. The caretaker gives them a tour of the home and Jane feels that something's amiss when they reach the basement.

The next day, Jane is informed that the buyer has backed out due to the local council's plans to designate the home as a national historical site. In her plan to reverse the decision, she meets her ex-lover, Anton (Marco Gumabao), who works as an assistant to the mayor. A series of events occur in the house - one event makes Jane's belly become bigger and bigger as if she is pregnant.

== Cast ==
Main cast

- Julia Barreto as Jane
- Xian Lim as Marco
- Marco Gumabao as Anton

Supporting cast

- Yoshihiko Hara as Shinsuke
- Erlina VillaLobos as Aling Using
  - Joy Ericka Florencondia as young Ising
- Gigi Hernandez as Jane's mother
- Rex Alamar as Jane's grandfather
- Inah Alegre as Mayoral
- Charry Castinlag as housekeeper

== Release ==
A teaser trailer was released on January 27, 2022. The film was released worldwide on streaming service Vivamax on February 25, 2022.
