= Between Maybes =

2019 romantic drama film by Jason Paul Laxamana

- Theatrical release poster
- Directed by: Jason Paul Laxamana
- Written by: Jason Paul Laxamana
- Produced by: Carlo L. Katigbak; Olivia M. Lamasan
- Starring: Gerald Anderson; Julia Barretto
- Cinematography: Carlos David S. Mauricio
- Edited by: Mai Calapardo
- Music by: Paulo Protacio
- Production company: Black Sheep Productions
- Distributed by: ABS-CBN Film Productions
- Release date: May 15, 2019
- Running time: 107 minutes
- Countries: Philippines; Japan
- Language: Filipino

Between Maybes is a 2019 Philippine romantic drama written and directed by Jason Paul Laxamana. Starring Gerald Anderson and Julia Barretto, with the supporting cast includes Yayo Aguila and Christian Vasquez, the film revolves around a romance between a man who lived a reclusive life in a town somewhere in Saga Prefecture and a washed-up actress who left Manila to Japan after having a verbal altercation with her parents.

Produced by Black Sheep Productions and distributed by ABS-CBN Film Productions (Star Cinema), the film was theatrically released on May 15, 2019.

== Plot ==
Hazel (Barretto) is an actress and commercial model who has a controlling relationship with her parents. One night, after having a heated argument with her parents, she decides to take a vacation and book a flight to Japan. Louie (Anderson), a Filipino living in Japan who serves as a seafood waiter, meets Hazel.

== Cast ==
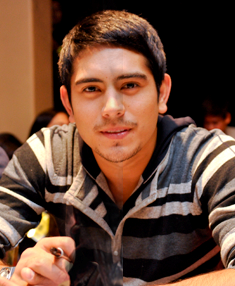
Gerald Anderson portrays Louie Puyat

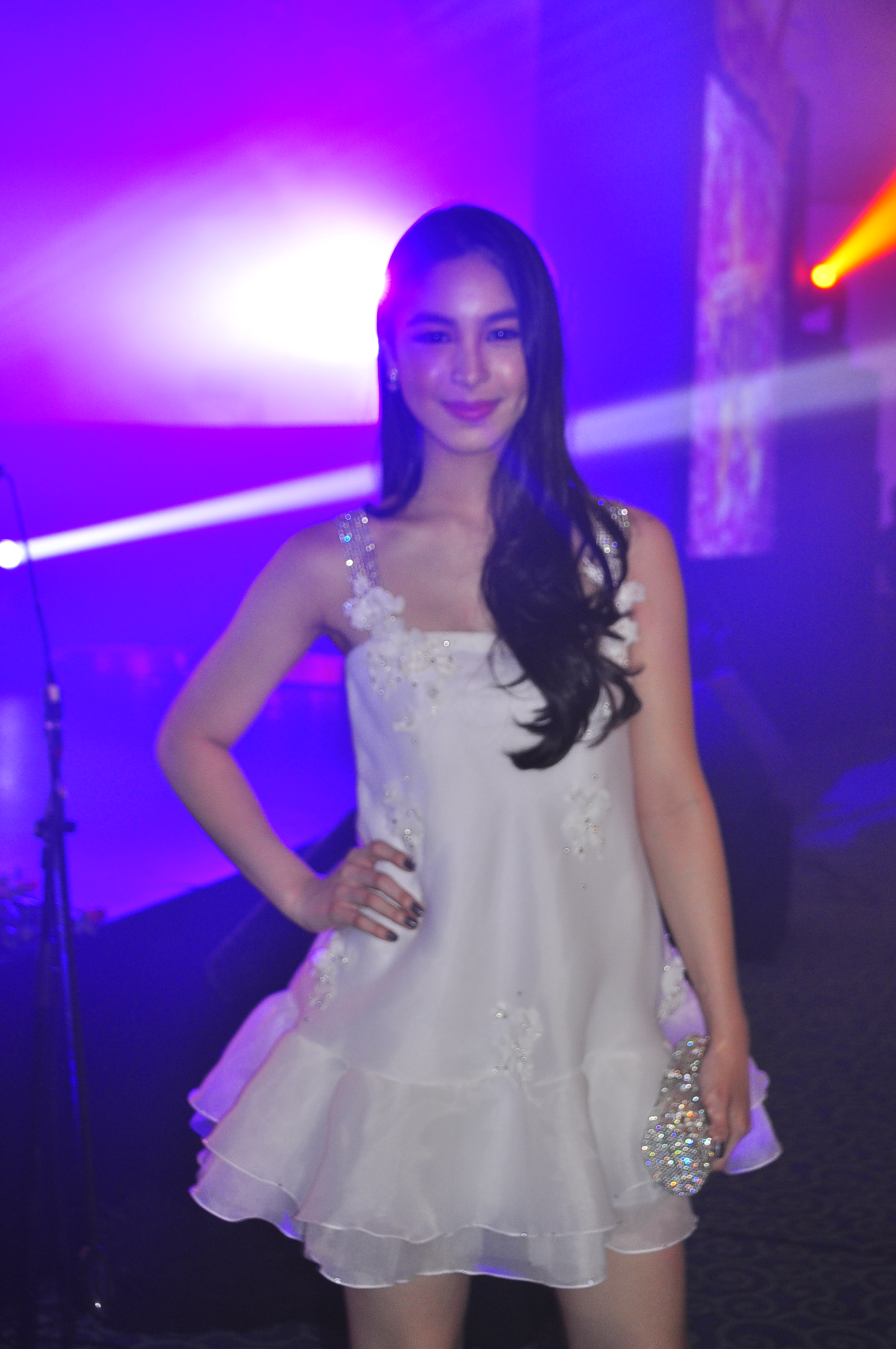
Julia Barretto portrays Hazel Ilagan

Main Cast

- Gerald Anderson as Louie Puyat
- Julia Barretto as Hazel Ilagan

Supporting Cast

- Yayo Aguila as Myra; Hazel's mom
- Christian Vasquez as Jerry; Hazel's dad
- Connie Virtucio
- Steven Acuña
- Pio Balbuena
- Ryle Santiago
- Marnie Lapus as producer

== Reception ==
=== Critical reception ===
Oggs Cruz, writing for Rappler, described the film as "clever", with praise towards its cast, the screenplay, and the emotional tension between the characters of Anderson and Barretto. He also called the film the "most successful of Laxamana’s subversions" where he subverted the trope of allowing morally ambiguous characters in having "elusive happily-ever-afters".
