= And I Love You So (TV series) =

- Title card
- Genre: Romance; Family; Melodrama
- Created by: ABS-CBN Studios; Keiko Aquino
- Developed by: ABS-CBN Studios
- Written by: Noreen Capili; Anton Pelon; Mari Lamasan
- Directed by: Onat A. Diaz; Jon S. Villarin; Don M. Cuaresma; Jerome C. Pobocan
- Starring: Miles Ocampo; Julia Barretto; Dimples Romana; Angel Aquino
- Opening theme: "And I Love You So" by Angeline Quinto
- Composer: Don McLean
- Country of origin: Philippines
- Original languages: Filipino; English
- No. of episodes: 70 (list of episodes)

Production
- Executive producers: Carlo L. Katigbak; Cory V. Vidanes; Laurenti Dyogi; Roldeo T. Endrinal
- Producers: Dagang Vilbar; Ethel Espiritu
- Production locations: Subic, Zambales; Lyceum of the Philippines University
- Editor: Roman Rodriguez
- Running time: 30–43 minutes
- Production company: Dreamscape Entertainment Television

Original release
- Network: ABS-CBN
- Release: December 7, 2015 – March 11, 2016

And I Love You So is a Philippine television drama melodrama series broadcast by ABS-CBN. Directed by Onat A. Diaz, Jon S. Villarin, Don M. Cuaresma and Jerome C. Pobocan, it stars Miles Ocampo, Julia Barretto, Dimples Romana and Angel Aquino. It aired on the network's Kapamilya Gold line up and worldwide on TFC from December 7, 2015 to March 11, 2016, replacing Walang Iwanan and was replaced by My Love Donna.

The series is streaming online on YouTube.

== Plot ==
And I Love You So revolves around the lives of Joanna (Miles Ocampo) and Trixie (Julia Barretto), who find themselves pitted against each other in everything they want. They become bitter rivals not only in school, but also in romance when they fall for the same guy – the internet sensation Justin (Iñigo Pascual).

Their rivalry intensifies and becomes more complicated when they are forced to live under one roof as stepsisters. Their lives change when their parents – Joanna's mother Michelle (Dimples Romana), and Trixie's father Alfonso (Tonton Gutierrez) – unexpectedly meet again. Years after being separated from each other, Alfonso takes his chance to ask Michelle, his true love, to marry him amidst the disapproval of Trixie.

But as they start to live their lives anew as one family, Katrina (Angel Aquino), Trixie's mother and Alfonso's first wife, returns after having abandoned both of them years ago without explanation. With her return, Katrina is determined to win back everything Michelle took away from her: her husband, her daughter, and her wealth.

== Cast and characters ==
=== Main cast ===
- Miles Ocampo as Joanna R. Valdez - Michelle and Alfonso's daughter, and Trixie's stepsister. The main female protagonist and antihero. She is intelligent, kind, and has determination to fight for what she believes in, including her identity surrounding her father.
- Julia Barretto as Patricia "Trixie" C. Valdez - Katrina and Alfonso's daughter, and Joanna's stepsister. The main antagonist of the series, and later protagonist in the end. Trixie becomes more cunning, deceitful, ruthless and manipulative after her mother makes her believe that Joanna and Michelle are a threat to their family. Later revealed that Dexter is her biological father.
- Dimples Romana as Michelle Ramirez-Valdez - Alfonso's real love interest and later his second wife. She is Joanna's mother and Katrina's former best friend. She is the main female protagonist of the series.
- Angel Aquino as Katrina Cervantes-Valdez - The first wife of Alfonso and Trixie's mother. She is the ex-best friend of Michelle. She later died with Dexter in a cliff. She is the main female antagonist, and later protagonist in the end.
- Tonton Gutierrez as Alfonso Valdez - The ex-husband of Katrina, current husband of Michelle, and Joanna's father & Trixie's stepfather. He was later killed by Dexter.
- Jay Manalo as Dominador "Dexter" Eustaquio Jimenez - Katrina's ex-lover and Trixie's biological father. He is the adopted son of Andres Jimenez. He is the final antagonist of the series.

=== Supporting cast ===
- Iñigo Pascual as Justin J. Santiago - Trixie's love interest who later has feelings for Joanna.
- Kenzo Gutierrez as Carlo Miranda - Trixie's best friend.
- Benjie Paras as Joey Ramirez - Michelle's brother and Joanna's uncle.
- Dante Rivero as Andres Jimenez - Dexter and Maureen's father.
- Francis Magundayao as Otep Reyes - Joanna's friend.
- Nikki Valdez as Maureen Jimenez-Santiago - Katrina's co-worker, Dexter's sister, and Justin's mother.
- Luke Jickain as Jonvic Santiago - Maureen's husband and Justin's father.
- Neil Coleta as Butch - the coach of volleyball in St. Benedictine College.
- Jong Cuenco as Donnie Miranda - Carlo's father.
- Chienna Filomeno as Chloe Escudero - Trixie's friend.
- Anna Vicente as Lauren - Trixie's friend.
- Dang Cruz as Yaya Marita - the maid in the Valdez family.
- Cai Cortez as Jinky - Michelle's friend.
- Miel Abong as Mabel - Joanna's friend.
- Kert Montante as Vic - Joanna's friend.

=== Special participation ===
- Sofia Pablo as young Trixie
- Myel de Leon as young Joanna
- Peewee O'Hara as Amparo Cervantes
- Alyssa Valdez as Herself

== Production ==
=== Casting ===
Raymond Bagatsing and Bing Loyzaga were originally cast for the roles of Alfonso and Maureen, but were later replaced by Tonton Gutierrez and Nikki Valdez.

=== Scheduling ===
Initially meant to be part of Primetime Bida evening block, And I Love You So was originally planned to replace Pasión de Amor in early 2016. However, in a last-minute change, the timeslot ended up downgraded as part of Kapamilya Gold afternoon block, after the network decided to immediately end Walang Iwanan on December 4, 2015, due to low ratings and lack of support. The schedule time is after Tubig at Langis.

=== Soundtrack ===
The titular theme song And I Love You So performed by Angeline Quinto is part of the volume one of Dreamscape Televisions of Love album.

== Reception ==
=== Ratings ===
Kantar Media National TV Ratings (4:15PM PST)
| Pilot Episode | Finale Episode | Peak | Average |
|---|---|---|---|
| 13.3% December 7, 2015 | 14.9% March 11, 2016 | 14.9% March 11, 2016 | 14.1% |

== See also ==
- List of programs broadcast by ABS-CBN
- List of ABS-CBN Studios original drama series
