= Malaya Lolas =

Organization in the Philippines

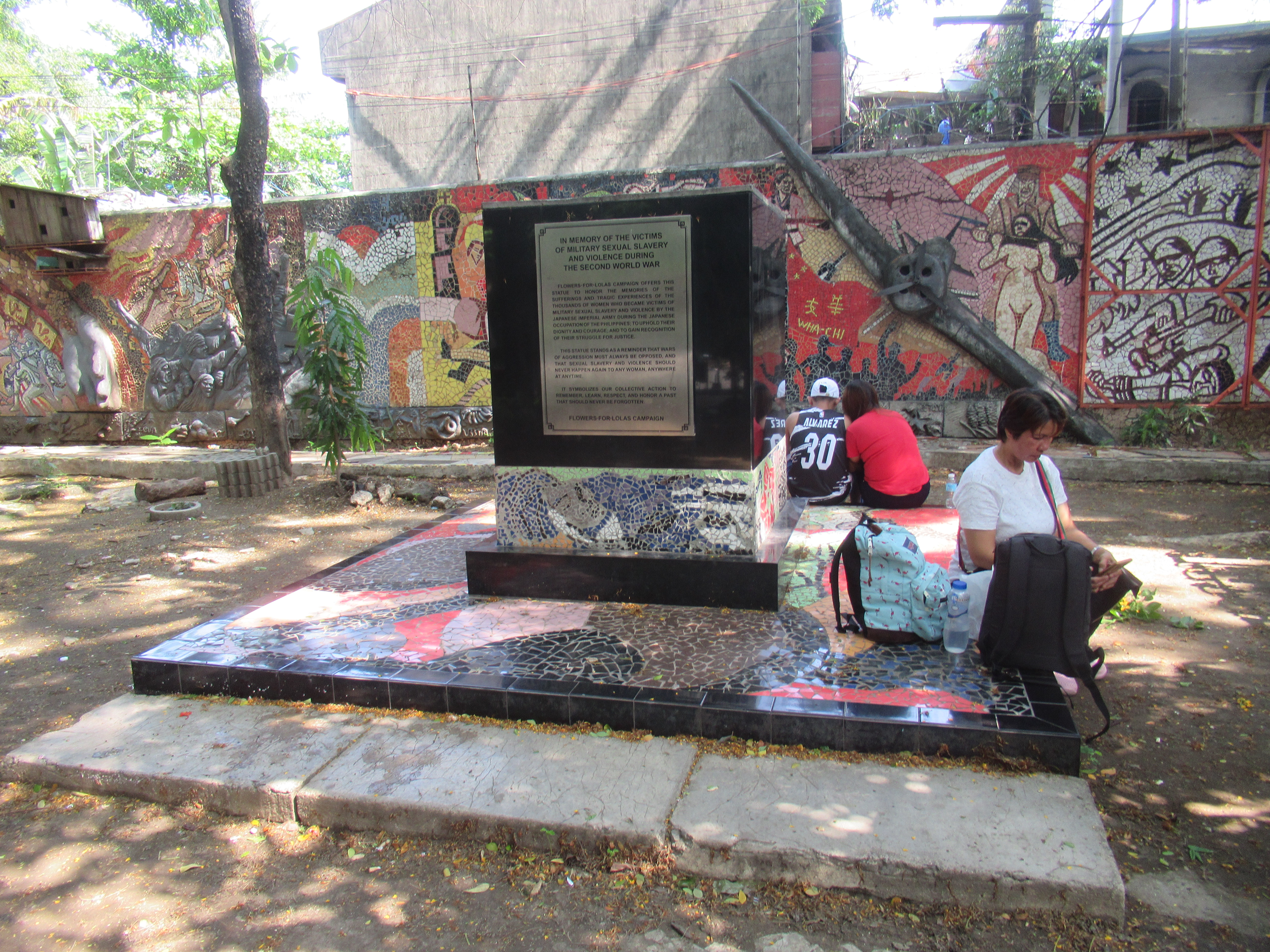
- Flower-for-Lolas Campaign Monument
- Formation: 1997; 29 years ago
- Founder: Isabelita Vinuya
- Founded at: Pampanga
- Purpose: Campaign for justice for former Filipino "comfort women"
- Location: Pampanga, Philippines
- Members: ~30 (2014)

The Malaya Lolas (lit. 'Free Grandmothers') are an organization based in Pampanga, Philippines composed of people who were formerly "comfort women" or victims of sexual slavery by the Imperial Japanese Army during the Japanese occupation of the Philippines during World War II.

== History ==
The history of the Malaya Lolas goes back to the Japanese occupation of the Philippines during World War II. The members of the group are mainly women who were gathered by Japanese Imperial Army soldiers from the town of Mapanique and was interred at the Bahay na Pula to be raped.

The Malaya Lolas were established in 1997 and initially had 90 members. Some of the women's husbands, sons, and other male relatives and acquaintances who were victims of war crimes are also members of the group.

By 2014, only about 30 members remained due to deaths. As 2024, Senator Risa Hontiveros said only 18 Malaya Lolas remain.

== Legal cases ==
The Malaya Lolas filed a suit demanding reparation from the Japanese government under Japanese courts but this was dismissed since they did not have legal personality to sue under international law and was told that the group's claims must have sponsorship of the Philippine government.

The organization then having more than 70 members filed a case before the Supreme Court in March 2004. They said that the Philippine government violated its legal obligation to deal with cases of crimes against humanity, when certain government officials did not support them in their complaints against the Japanese government before the International Court of Justice and other international courts. They urged the court to hold these officials accountable for abuse of discretion. The group also branded the Philippine government's acceptance of Japan's apologies and its acceptance of monetary payment from the Japanese-financed Asian Women's Fund as contrary to international law.

The court ruled to dismiss the case in 2010, and a motion for reconsideration was filed by the group's legal team. The court reaffirmed its decision in 2014. It argued that the case is a diplomatic matter and should be handled by the executive branch.
