= Vince & Kath & James =

Vince and Kath and James
- Theatrical Poster
- Directed by: Theodore Boborol
- Screenplay by: Daisy Cayanan; Kim Noromor; Anjanette Haw
- Based on: Vince and Kath by Jenny Ruth Almocera
- Produced by: Charo Santos-Concio; Malou N. Santos
- Starring: Julia Barretto; Joshua Garcia; Ronnie Alonte
- Cinematography: Gary Gardoce
- Edited by: Beng Bandong
- Music by: Jessie Lasaten
- Production company: ABS-CBN Film Productions Inc.
- Distributed by: Star Cinema
- Release date: December 25, 2016
- Running time: 116 minutes
- Country: Philippines
- Languages: Filipino; English
- Box office: ₱123 million

Vince and Kath and James (stylized as Vince & Kath & James) is a 2016 Filipino teen romantic film directed by Theodore Boborol, starring Julia Barretto, Joshua Garcia and Ronnie Alonte. It is based on the online series Vince and Kath written by Jenny Ruth Almocera, that told the story of two lovestruck teens, Vince and Kath, through text messages.

The film was graded "A" by the Cinema Evaluation Board of the Philippines. It is an official entry to the 2016 Metro Manila Film Festival, where it won the Children's Choice Award along fellow entries Saving Sally and Sunday Beauty Queen, and the Male Celebrity of the Night award for Ronnie Alonte.

The film was famous during its run and helps the careers of Joshua Garcia and Julia Barretto rise to fame and prominence because of their impressive performance as the lovers, Vince and Kath.

== Plot ==
Kath (Julia Barretto) wins Miss Engineering 2016, making her more popular and receiving many congratulatory messages many people. Among them are Vince (Joshua Garcia), who has a crush on her for a long time but hides it and chooses to tease Kath every time they see each other, and James (Ronnie Alonte), the top varsity player of the school, who finds Kath beautiful after seeing her in the pageant.

Vince and James are cousins but they are the total opposites. They both live in James' house as Vince's mother (Ina Raymundo) is away with her new family and it is James' parents who pays for his tuition fee and other needs. Vince is a top student who always get good grades while varsity player James focuses on his basketball career that he forgets about his studies. As a result, his grades are low and his parents always scold him. Vince is always at hand to steer away James' parents' attention so they would stop scolding him, to which James is thankful to Vince and they develop to be best friends. Whenever James needs help in his academics, Vince is always there to lend a hand.

Yet Vince did not expect that this time, James is asking help not in his school requirements but in texting and getting to be friends with the girl they both admire, Kath. James initially didn't receive any reply from Kath after messaging her which he didn't know was due to Kath not having an internet connection. James also found out that Vince helped another schoolmate Clinton to have a girlfriend so he thinks that Vince would really be a great help to make Kath notice him. Vince agrees reluctantly to James' request.

When Vince first texted Kath anonymously, Kath was busy taking care of her brother who just got circumcised. This leads to Kath unintentionally sending her question on what to do with her brother to Vince. Vince and James find the mistake a great opportunity to get Kath's attention. They reply an effective solution which Kath immediately does. Relieved, she finds out about the mistake and sends apology. However, she also texts words of gratitude for willingly helping her with her brother.

This leads to the start of the text conversations of Kath and Vince. Yet Vince didn't reveal to her that it was him nor James texting her. He came up with the nickname "Var", short for varsity player, when Kath asked for his name. Kath is left with the only hint that her new textmate is a varsity player but goes on communicating with him.

Meanwhile, as Kath still has no idea about the real identity of her textmate Var, she joins an on-the-job training at a factory for her course. Vince and Kath's best friend Maxine (Maris Racal) is also there. Vince continues to tease and irritate Kath especially that the girls' job are not in the working area like the boys' but are just office works which, according to Vince is not even engineering-related. Plus, Vince sees Kath's reaction when he sends him sweet text messages through Var, much to his laughter and at the same time, giddiness.

Kath just can't end texting with Var even if she doesn't really know him yet, thanks to Vince's effective pick-up lines and sweet words. Var tells her that he would be calling her "Cheer", short for cheerleader for according to him, Kath cheers him up. While reading their exchange of text messages, James admits that he also felt in love and tells Vince to continue the "Var" gimmick until such time that Kath asks him to meet her personally. That's the only time when James comes into the scene as he would be the one to meet her face to face. Vince is again sad but he had no choice other than to nod to James' plan.

Later on, Vince finds himself enjoying having Kath as his textmate even if he knows that Kath would not end up with him due to James. He shares his sentiments anonymously in his famous blog Da Vinci Quotes through six-letter sentences and phrases. Time came when James finally told him to ask Kath to meet up with him already. Kath, on the other hand, had doubts agreeing to the meet-up at first, but after Maxine's convincing and sending "Yes" herself, she finally approves. Receiving the confirmation, James is happy while Vince gets sad. The time is up for Kath and him as Var.

== Cast ==
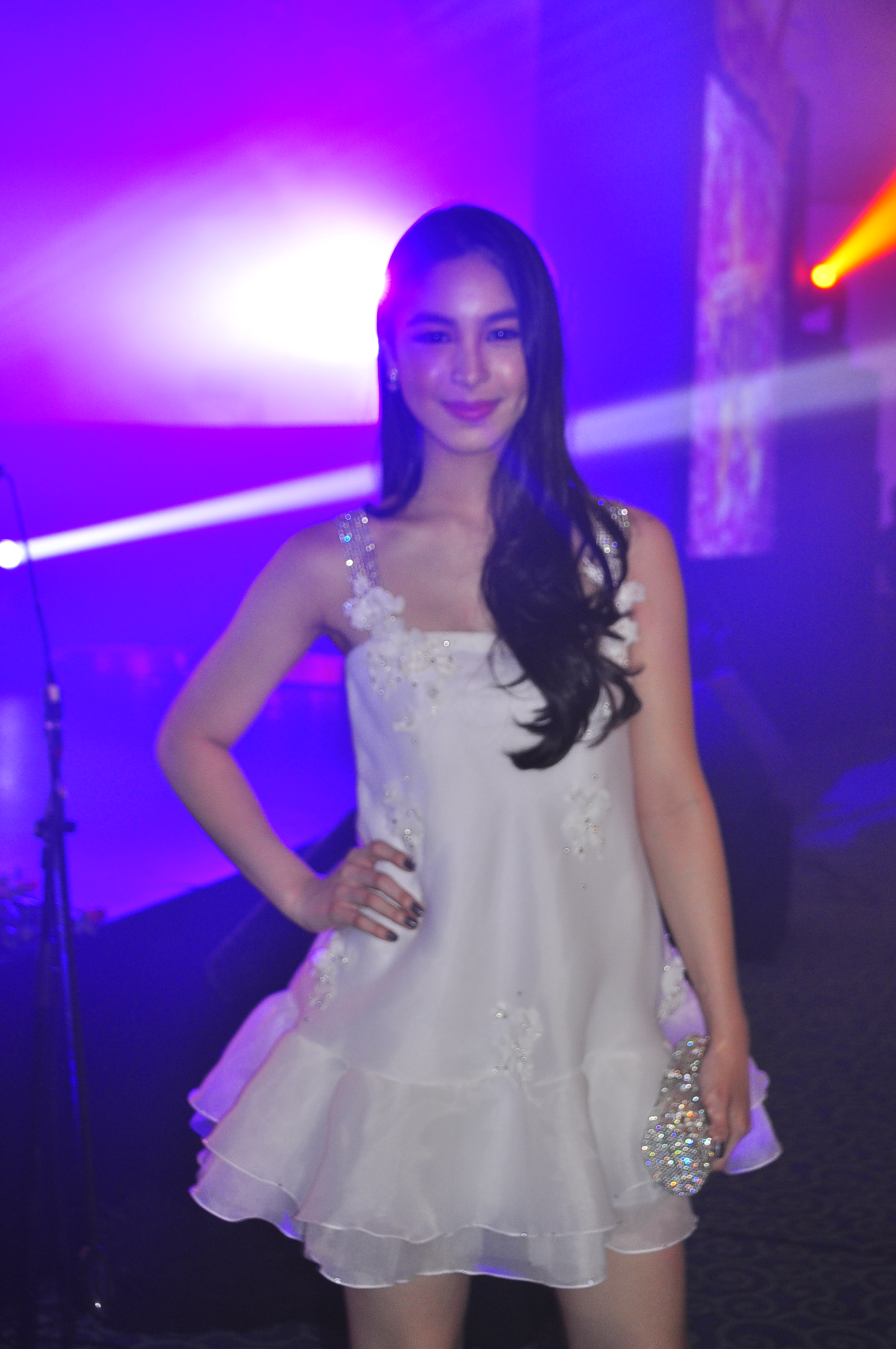
Julia Barretto portrays Kathleen "Kath" Gonzales

Joshua Garcia portrays Michael Vincent "Vince" Arcilla

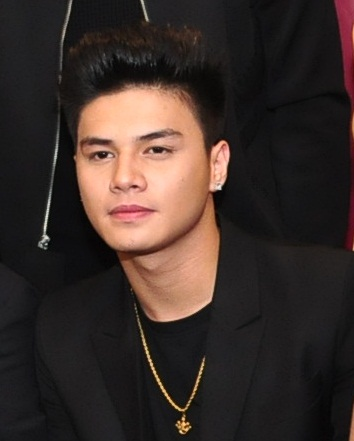
Ronnie Alonte portrays Jaime "James" Raymundo III

- Julia Barretto as Kathleen "Kath" Gonzales
- Joshua Garcia as Michael Vincent "Vince" Arcilla
- Ronnie Alonte as Jaime "James" Raymundo III
- Maris Racal as Maxine/ Kath's Best friend
- Ina Raymundo as Belinda / Vince's mother
- Shamaine Buencamino as Karina Gonzales / Kath's mother
- Ana Abad-Santos as Beatrice Raymondo/ James' mother
- Jeric Raval as Jaime Raymundo II / James' father
- Allan Paule as Mr. Gonzales/ Kath's father
- Manuel Chua as Victor Gonzales/ Kath's uncle
- Joshua Zamora as Vince's stepfather
- AJ Urquia as Kyle Gonzales / Kath's brother
- Kelvin Miranda as Networker
- Axel Torres as Emman
- Milo Elmido Jr. as Clinton
- Pontri Bernardo as Engr. Javier

== Production ==
The film's principal photography began in late July 2016.

== Music ==
In the background of the official movie trailer released on November 23, 2016, through Metro Manila Film Festival's official Facebook page was "O Pag-ibig" by Ylona Garcia and Bailey May. The song was a finalist in the 2016 edition of Himig Handog P-Pop Love Songs. A contest was held for aspiring Filipino singers and composers to submit their original composition for a chance to be a part of the movie's official soundtrack. The winning song was "Hey Crush" by Volts Vallejo.

=== Soundtrack ===
Vince & Kath & James (Movie Soundtrack)

Soundtrack album by Various artists
- Released: December 16, 2016
- Length: 28:45
- Label: Star Music

Vince & Kath & James (Movie Soundtrack)
No.	Title	Performer(s)	Length
1.	"Hey Crush"	Joshua Garcia	2:17
2.	"O Pag-ibig"	Ylona Garcia, Bailey May	3:37
3.	"Walang Basagan ng Trip"	Jugs Jugueta, Teddy Corpuz	3:03
4.	"Simpleng Tulad Mo"	Daniel Padilla	3:45
5.	"Dapit-Hapon"	Ebe Dancel	4:55
6.	"Love at Website"	Ronnie Alonte	3:20
7.	"Dahan Dahan Dahan Lang"	Ylona Garcia	3:43
8.	"If We Fall in Love"	Yeng Constantino	4:07
Total length:			28:45

== Release ==
Vince & Kath & James was released on December 25, 2016, as an official entry to the 2016 Metro Manila Film Festival. The film, among most entries of the festival, was graded "A" by the Cinema Evaluation Board of the Philippines which allows them to enjoy an additional 15 tax rebate. It grossed ₱17 million on its opening day topping the first day gross among other competing entries. On January 3, 2017, Star Cinema claimed that the film grossed ₱105 million, but this figure has since increased to ₱123 million worldwide as of January 24, 2017.

=== Reception ===
The film has received generally positive reviews. Melvin Sarangay of Inquirer Bandera writes that although its prospective audiences are teenagers, the film "surpasses as a family movie because of its discussion of some real life issues in a family." Abby Mendoza of FHM Philippines writes, "[W]hile you’ve plausibly seen all these before: an incredibly convoluted plot imbued with all-too familiar characters, Vince and Kath and James pulls off rom-com tropes with flair. [...] It’s cute without being annoying."

Oggs Cruz of Rappler was less taken with the film, largely because of the story's predictability. Cruz notes that its theme bears resemblance to the 1897 play Cyrano de Bergerac by French poet Edmond Rostand, and the 2002 film Got 2 Believe starring Rico Yan and Claudine Barretto. Furthermore, he writes: "Vince & Kath & James is an engaging confection. Theodore Boborol has crafted a rom-com that doesn’t need to deviate to delight."

== Sequel ==
On February 21, 2019, Star Cinema made the announcement at the story conference for the upcoming movie. The sequel James and Pat and Dave was released on February 12, 2020.

== Awards ==
Year	Award	Category	Recipient(s)	Outcome
2016	42nd Metro Manila Film Festival			
2016	42nd Metro Manila Film Festival	Best Picture	Vince & Kath & James	Nominated
2016	42nd Metro Manila Film Festival	Best Actor	Joshua Garcia	Nominated
2016	42nd Metro Manila Film Festival	Best Original Theme Song	"Hey Crush" by Volts Vallejo	Nominated
2016	42nd Metro Manila Film Festival	Best Musical Score	Jessie Lasaten	Nominated
2016	42nd Metro Manila Film Festival	Children's Choice Award	Vince & Kath & James	Won
2017	48th Box Office Entertainment Awards			
2017	48th Box Office Entertainment Awards	Most Promising Movie Actor of the Year	Joshua Garcia	Won
2017	48th Box Office Entertainment Awards	Most Promising Movie Actress of the Year	Julia Barretto	Won
