= Bahay na Pula =

Mansion and site of WWII atrocities in Bulacan, Philippines

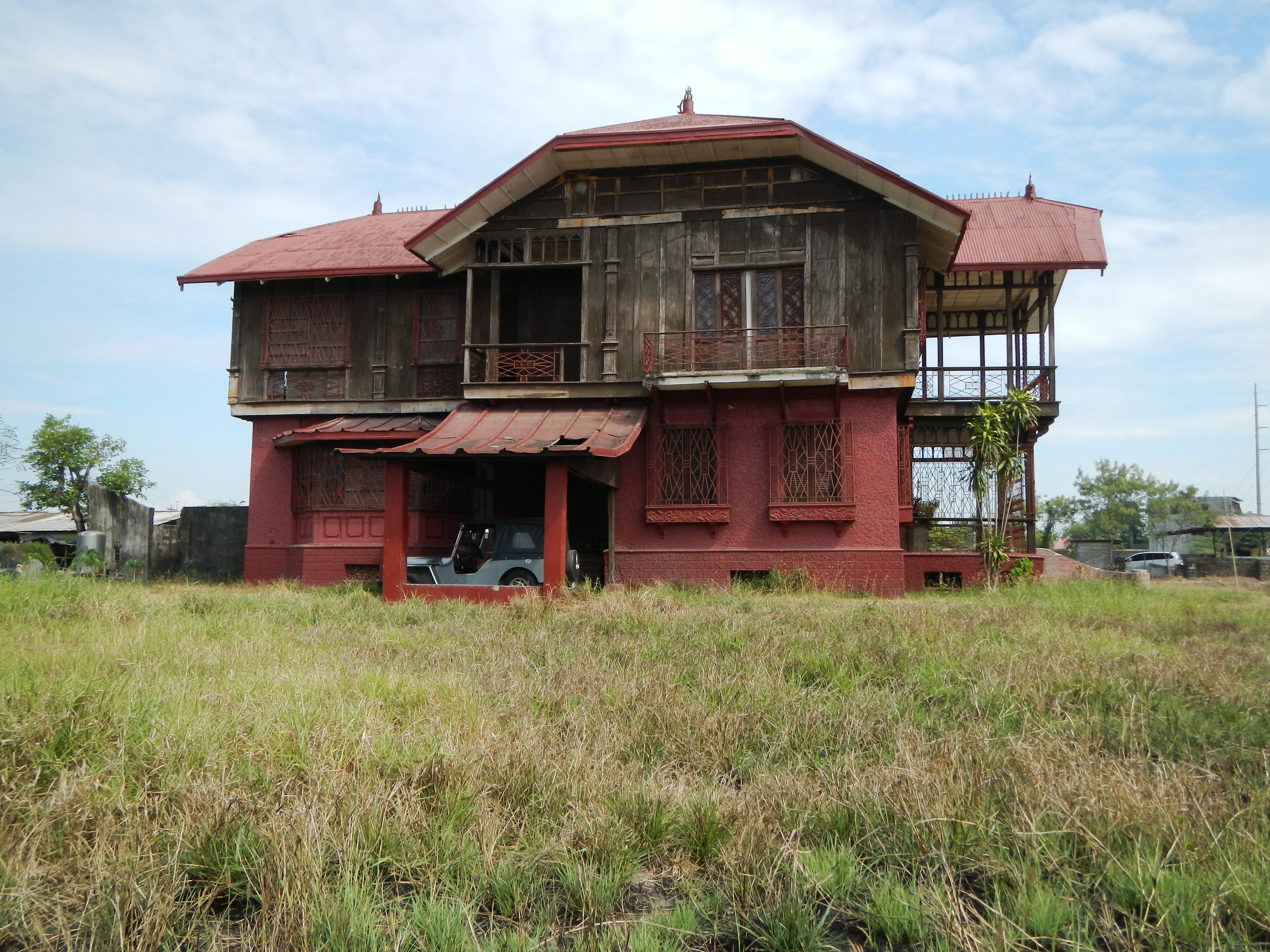
- The building in 2014

- Location within Bulacan Location within Luzon Location within Philippines
- Alternative names: The Red House

General information
- Status: Dilapidated
- Location: San Ildefonso, Philippines
- Coordinates: 15°05′47″N 120°56′23″E
- Completed: 1929
- Demolished: 2016 (partially)
- Owner: Ilusorio family

Technical details
- Material: Wood
- Floor count: 2

Design and construction
- Known for: Comfort women and Sexual slavery and Japanese garrison during World War II

The Bahay na Pula (Tagalog, “red house”) is a former hacienda in San Ildefonso, Bulacan in the Philippines. The site is remembered for the mass rapes and murders committed there by the Imperial Japanese Army during World War II. The Japanese military murdered all of the men and boys in the adjacent village of Mapaniqui, Candaba, Pampanga, and forced over 100 women and girls into sexual slavery, confining and raping them in the house. It was partially demolished in 2016 for unknown reasons. There are calls by activists to preserve it as a memorial to the victims of Japanese atrocities during the occupation of the Philippines.

== History ==
The Red House was built in 1929 in Barangay Anyantam by Don Ramón Ilusorio of the Ilusorio family, who owned a vast hacienda in the area. It was made largely out of wood and painted red on the outside giving it its name. The house itself has a floor area of around 400 square meters (4,300 sq ft) and stands on a private lot measuring 8,000 square meters (86,000 sq ft). The house was originally surrounded by large gardens filled with tamarind, camachile, and duhat trees.

During the Japanese occupation of the Philippines, on November 23, 1944, the Geki Group of the 14th District Army under Imperial Japanese Army General Tomoyuki Yamashita attacked Mapaniqui, Candaba, Pampanga. Under the assumption that Mapaniqui was a guerrilla hideout, Japanese soldiers plundered and razed the town, corralling and executed all the men and boys, killing some women and children in the carnage, and forcibly confining and repeatedly raping the remaining women and girls in Bahay na Pula. According to the eyewitness testimony of survivor María Lalu Quilantang, her father was castrated and his "penis stuffed in his mouth like a cigar". Another survivor, Narcisa Clavería, said she saw a Japanese soldier skin her father "like a water buffalo" with a bayonet. The corpses of the slaughtered were all thrown into a huge pile and burnt in the schoolyard.

The Imperial Japanese Army looted numerous households in the area. Women from Pampanga and neighbouring Bulacan, who numbered more than a hundred, were made to carry provisions and spoils to Japanese troops quartered at Bahay na Pula. Once they arrived, the women were sexually enslaved, as were girls aged eight and nine years. One woman, nicknamed Lola Honor, was a prepubescent girl who was stabbed by a bayonet in her thigh for refusing the advances of a soldier. Documented reports have shown various human rights violations.

Most of the survivors have left the wider region due to trauma from the occupation and atrocities committed by the Imperial Japanese Army. In 1997, The Malaya Lolas (“Free Grandmothers”), an organization of women fighting for their rights and compensation for the losses from the war, was established in Pampanga. The Asian Women's Fund, created by the Japanese government and funded by Japanese citizens donations to distribute monetary compensation to comfort women, did not provide compensation to the women sexually enslaved at Bahay na Pula. According to the Asian Women's Fund, the victims were not defined as comfort women as they were not held or abused over an extended period. Filipino survivors demanded the Japanese government take legal responsibility by making a public apology explicitly acknowledging the sexual violence committed against them, and providing them compensation.

In 2014, the Supreme Court of the Philippines denied the motion for reconsideration filed by the Malaya Lolas, who wanted to sue the Philippine government for grave abuse of discretion for refusing to support claims against the Japanese state for war crimes and crimes against humanity.

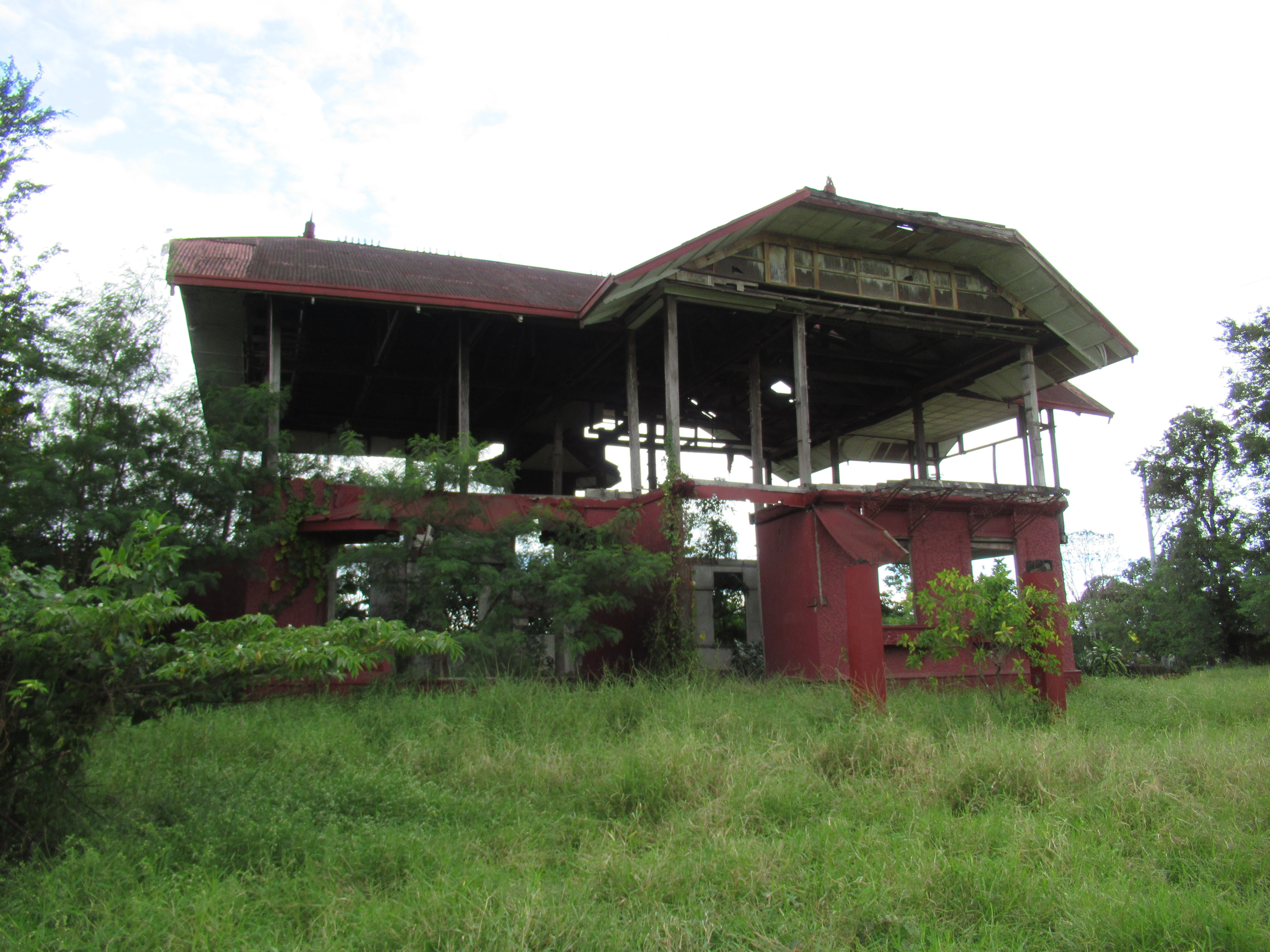
The Bahay na Pula in 2022, after its partial demolition

In mid-2016, the heritage structure was partially demolished due to undisclosed reasons. The house was allegedly going to be rebuilt in Las Casas Filipinas de Acuzar on the coast of Bagac, Bataan province to the west. The frames and roof of the house were left as are parts of its iconic ground floor and color. In November 2016, several human rights groups, including Bertha's Impact Opportunity Fund, the European Center for Constitutional and Human Rights, and the Center for International Law, Manila, traveled to Geneva to seek United Nations' support for Malaya Lolas. In 2017, Cinema One Originals launched Haunted: A Last Visit to the Red House, a full-length documentary film about Bahay na Pula, the comfort women who suffered, and their ongoing battle even as they are now in their 80s and 90s.

Some historians and cultural heritage workers have expressed the need for the site's conservation. The house was partially dismantled after 2014 and was in danger of collapse. Several survivors also want Bahay na Pula to remain as a memorial to victims of the Imperial Japanese Army.

== In Media ==
- Scenes of the villain headquarters Regalado Mansion in the 1988 comedy-action-horror, Kumander Bawang, were filmed at Bahay Na Pula and its gardens.
- The house was the studio setting for the 1991 Undas/Halloween Special of the ABS-CBN telemagazine program, Magandang Gabi... Bayan.
- Bahay na Pula, a 2022 horror film directed by Brillante Mendoza, was released worldwide via streaming on Vivamax on February 25, 2023.

== See also ==
- Malaya Lolas
- Wartime sexual violence
- Japanese war crimes
- Comfort women
