= Walang Iwanan (TV series) =

2015 Philippine television drama series

- Title card
- Genre: Family drama; Slice of life
- Created by: ABS-CBN Studios
- Developed by: ABS-CBN Studios; Linggit Tan-Marasigan
- Written by: Denise O'Hara; Genesis Rodriguez; Raymund Barcelon
- Directed by: Jerome C. Pobocan
- Starring: Louise Abuel; Raikko Mateo; Micko Laurente; John Michael; Karla Cruz; Roxanne Guinoo; Jhong Hilario; John Estrada; Beauty Gonzalez
- Opening theme: "Bawat Bata" by Louise Abuel, Raikko Mateo, Karla Cruz, Jon Michael and Micko Laurente
- Composer: Jim Paredes
- Country of origin: Philippines
- Original language: Filipino
- No. of episodes: 35

Production
- Executive producers: Carlo L. Katigbak; Cory V. Vidanes; Laurenti Dyogi; Linggit Tan-Marasigan
- Editor: Alexces Megan Abarquez
- Running time: 30 minutes
- Production company: LTM Unit

Original release
- Network: ABS-CBN
- Release: October 19 – December 4, 2015

Walang Iwanan (transl. no one left behind) is a 2015 Philippine television drama series broadcast by ABS-CBN. Directed by Jerome C. Pobocan, it stars Louise Abuel, Raikko Mateo, Micko Laurente, John Michael, Karla Cruz, Roxanne Guinoo, Jhong Hilario, John Estrada and Beauty Gonzalez. It aired on the network's Kapamilya Gold line up and worldwide on TFC from October 19 to December 4, 2015 replacing Nasaan Ka Nang Kailangan Kita and was replaced by And I Love You So.

The series is streaming online on YouTube.

== Plot ==
Jose Bautista (Louise Abuel) grew away from his mother, father and siblings. He lived with his two grandmothers, Lola Ina and Lola Ebe. Jose didn't know the truth behind his identity that he was the son of Anita (Roxanne Guinoo) with another man, Roel (Joem Bascon). But due to the simple dream of Anita's whole family to have a child, she chose to marry Kamlon (Jhong Hilario) who promised Anita he will treat Jose like his real child. But Kamlon does not fulfill that promise and denies Jose. Because of their desperation to correct the mistakes, Ebe and Ina raised Jose with them.

Jose grew happy, obedient, and respectful. He never once questioned his separation from his family but he still longed to be with them one day too. Jose was satisfied and happy with his grandmothers until both of them died. Jose moves to his family's home and because of the lessons taught by them, he has to learned to be positive in life and live with the family he has not met. Anita has introduced Jose to his siblings, Boy (Micko Laurente), Maribel (Karla Cruz), Crisencio (Jon Michael) and Michael (Raikko Mateo), they are equally uncomfortable with him. It was hard to get close to them because Boy hated him.

== Cast and characters ==
=== Main cast ===
- Louise Abuel as Jose Bautista
- Micko Laurente as Boy Bautista
- Raikko Mateo as Michael Bautista
- Jon Michael as Crisencio Bautista
- Karla Cruz as Maribel Bautista
- Roxanne Guinoo as Anita Bautista
- Jhong Hilario as Kamlon Bautista
- John Estrada as Diosdado "Dado" Pascual
- Beauty Gonzales as Jane Bautista

=== Supporting cast ===
- Alex Castro as Father Chito
- Nicco Manalo as Sarge
- Yda Yaneza as Lola Maring
- Crispin Pineda as Lolo Pido
- Jeff Luna as Elmer Cortes
- Marcus Cabrera as Mark
- Karen Reyes as Rose
- Wacky Macky as Gemma

=== Special participation ===
- Boots Anson-Roa as Lola Ina
- Ces Quesada as Lola Ebe
- JC Santos as Ricky

=== Guest cast ===
- Irma Adlawan as Lydia Trinidad-Gonzales
- Joem Bascon as Roel
- Lito Pimentel as Rodrigo
- Shey Bustamante as Grace
- Jerould Aceron as a beggar
- Ramon Christopher as Tisoy
- Dionne Monsanto
- Smokey Manaloto
- Marnie Lapuz

== Reception ==
KANTAR MEDIA NATIONAL TV RATINGS (4:00PM PST)
Pilot episode	Finale episode	PEAK	AVERAGE	SOURCE
12.0%	10.4%	TBA	TBA	

== See also ==
- List of ABS-CBN Studios original drama series
