= Julia Barretto =

Filipino actress (born 1997)

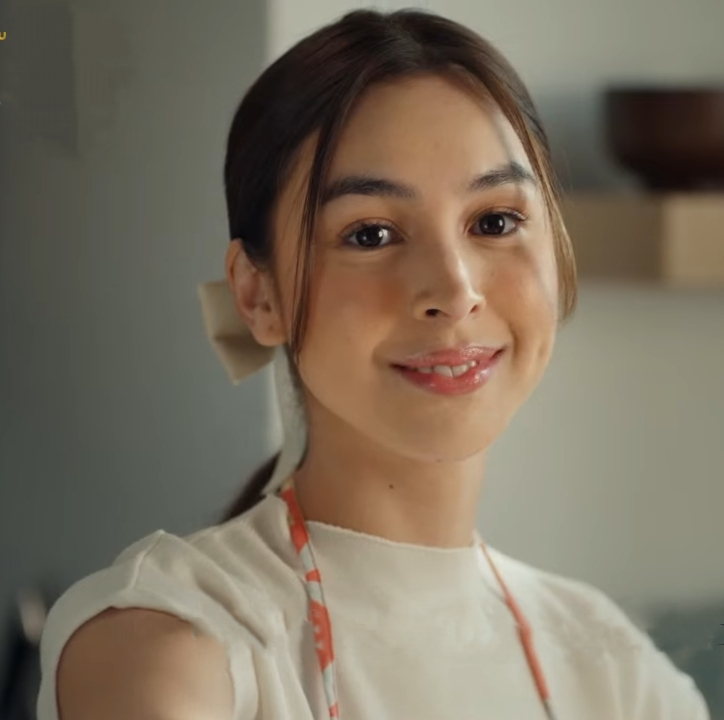
- Barretto in 2024
- Born: Julia Francesca Barretto Baldivia; March 10, 1997 (age 29); Marikina, Metro Manila, Philippines
- Education: St. Paul College, Pasig
- Occupation: Actress
- Years active: 2006–present
- Agent(s): Star Magic (2006–2020); Viva Artists Agency (2020–2026)
- Parents: Dennis Padilla; Marjorie Barretto
- Relatives: Gretchen Barretto (aunt); Claudine Barretto (aunt); Dencio Padilla (grandfather)

Julia Francesca Barretto Baldivia (born March 10, 1997) is a Filipino actress. Known for playing lead roles in romantic comedy and drama, she began her acting career as a child actress in several television soap operas. She has starred in numerous blockbuster films such as Vince and Kath and James (2016), Love You to the Stars and Back (2017), Unexpectedly Yours (2017) and Un/Happy for You (2024). Her accolades include two FAMAS Awards and three Box Office Entertainment Awards, including nominations for an Asian Television Awards and two Luna Awards.

== Early life and background ==
Barretto is the daughter of actors Dennis Padilla and Marjorie Barretto. She has a brother named Leon. Her aunts are actresses Claudine Barretto and Gretchen Barretto.

She finished grade school (Grades 1 to 7) at Miriam College in Quezon City in March 2011. She started high school at Miriam College from freshman to sophomore year, where she played as a member of their varsity volleyball team in the WNCAA, until she transferred to St. Paul College in Pasig in 2013 during her junior year under their curriculum for professional talents after signing a contract with Star Magic. She graduated high school in 2015.

== Career ==
=== Early years and breakthrough (2006–2014) ===
Barretto began her career as a child actress and made her screen debut in Gulong ng Palad (2006). After playing several supporting roles in television, she gained fame as Anna in the fantasy series Kokey (2007) and appeared as Pamela Kiev in the action drama series Palos the following year. She also appeared in numerous episodes of the anthologies Wansapanataym and Maalaala Mo Kaya in the succeeding years. In 2011, she made her first appearance at the Star Magic Ball and was awarded Princess of the Night the following year. In 2013, she was launched as part of Star Magic Circle, along with Liza Soberano and Janella Salvador. She landed her first lead role in the drama series Mirabella (2014) opposite Enrique Gil. According to Kantar Media, the series was the fourth most watched television show throughout its run and garnered its highest nationwide viewership of 27.3% during its finale episode. The same year, Barretto was honored with a German Moreno Youth Achievement Award at the 62nd FAMAS Awards.

=== Mainstream stardom (2015–2019) ===
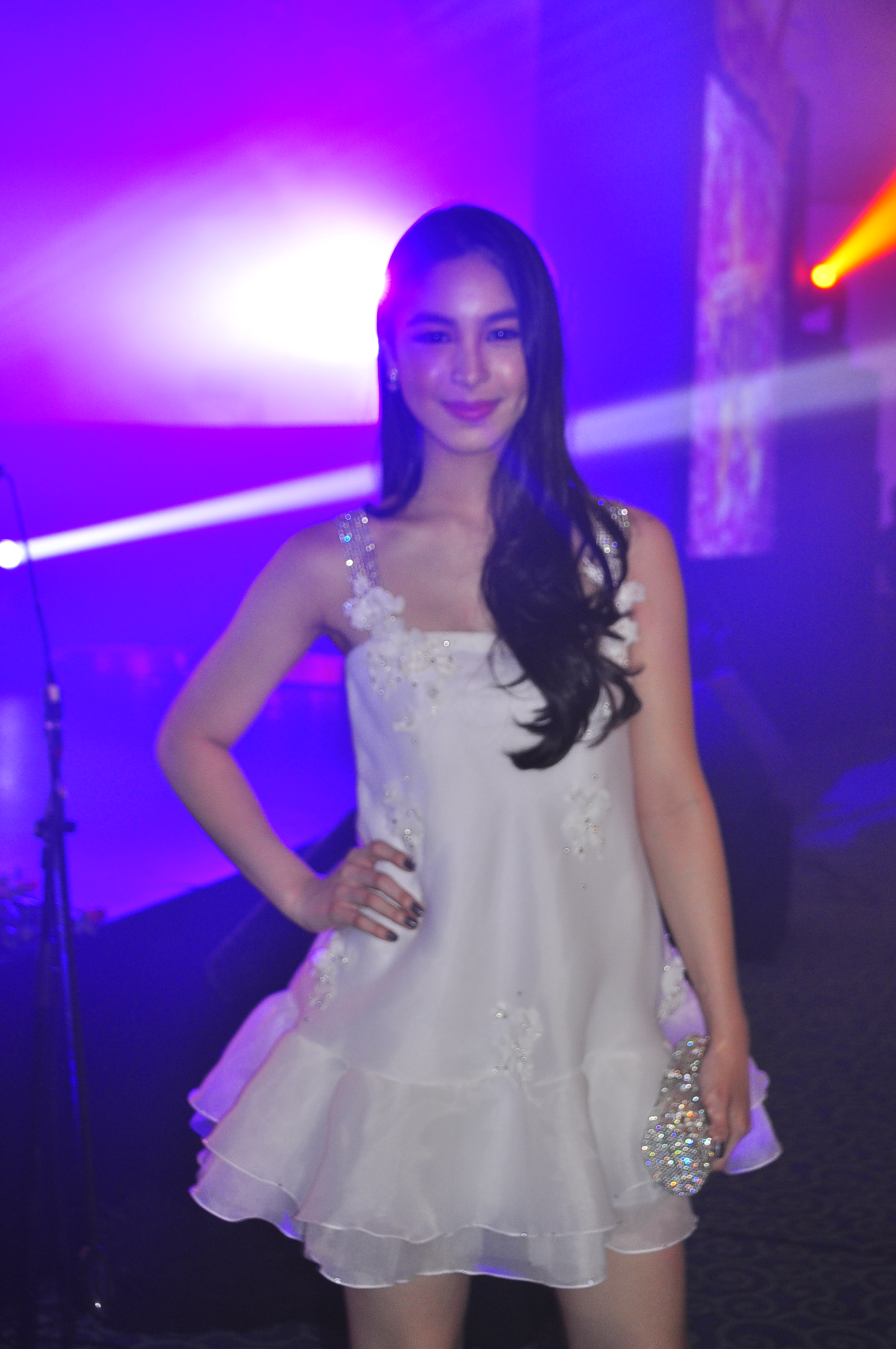
Barretto at the Candy Style Awards in 2013

In May 2015, Barretto made her film debut in the teen romance Para sa Hopeless Romantic. The film earned her a nomination at the 64th FAMAS Awards for Best Supporting Actress. Later that year, she starred with Miles Ocampo in the melodrama series And I Love You So. Barretto ventured more roles in romantic comedies and drama. In December 2016, she starred alongside Joshua Garcia and Ronnie Alonte in the film Vince and Kath and James. It was selected as one of the official entries at the 42nd Metro Manila Film Festival and became a blockbuster hit, earning ₱123 million at the Philippine box office. Following their successful team up, Barretto and Garcia starred again in another Star Cinema film, Love You to the Stars and Back. The film was acclaimed by the critics and has earned ₱112 million at the domestic box office. Barretto's performance also earned her nominations for Best Actress at the FAMAS and Luna Awards.

In 2017, Barretto teamed up with Garcia for the third time and starred in the film Unexpectedly Yours with Sharon Cuneta and Robin Padilla. The film garnered bigger numbers at the box office, grossing ₱249 million worldwide. In August 2018, the tandem made their television series debut in the drama series Ngayon at Kailanman. The show was a consistent top rater, garnered its highest national TV rating of 34.7% in the finale. The same year, the pair starred with Kris Aquino in the film I Love You, Hater. In May 2019, she starred in the romance drama film Between Maybes opposite Gerald Anderson, her first project without Garcia in more than two years. Barretto has earned consecutive nominations for Movie Loveteam of the Year at the PMPC Star Awards for Movies from 2017 to 2022 (excluding 2020).

=== Continued success (2020–present) ===
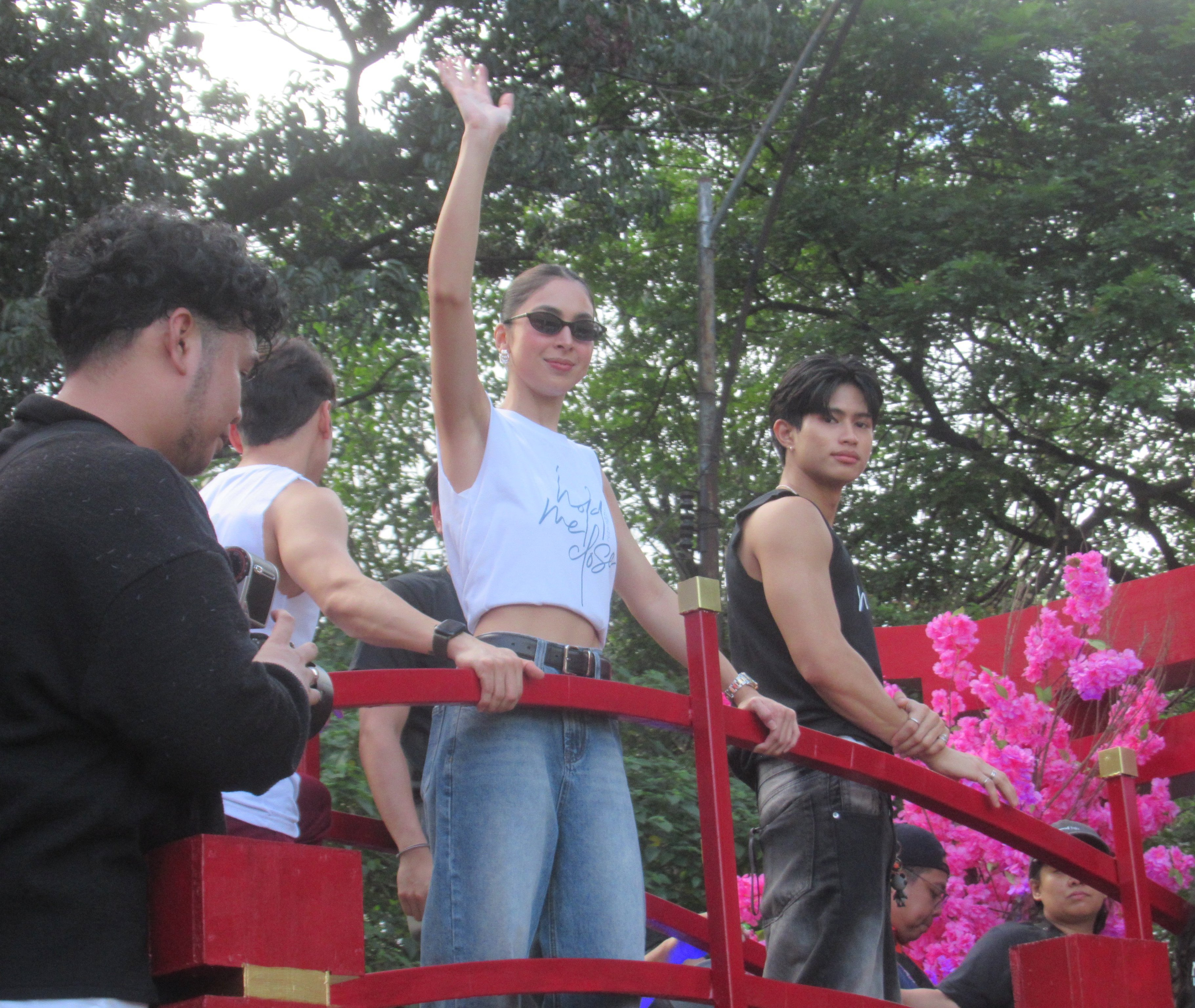
Barretto at the 2024 Metro Manila Film Festival

In January 2020, she starred in the zombie thriller film Block Z. While the film performed moderately at the box office, it achieved the highest number of first day registrations by any KBO movie following its availability on iWant and ABS-CBN TVplus' KBO. In February 2020, she starred in an iWant original series I Am U opposite Tony Labrusca. In September 2020, Barretto left Star Magic and signed a management contract with Viva Artists Agency. In February 2022, she starred alongside Xian Lim and Marco Gumabao in the horror film Bahay na Pula. In September 2022, Barretto starred with Carlo Aquino in the romantic drama Expensive Candy. It marked her first venture into sexy roles and received acclaim from critics for her performance.

In 2023, Barretto was featured on the cover of Preview Magazine for their September issue, her first in over a decade. In November, she was announced as the newest calendar girl for the local liquor brand Tanduay.

In 2024, Barretto starred alongside Korean actor Sang Heon Lee and Indonesian actor Nicholas Saputra in the Viu Philippines web series entitled Secret Ingredient. She was nominated for Best Leading Female in a Digital Series at the 2024 Asian Television Awards for her performance in the series.

Barretto reunited with Garcia after four years in the 2024 romantic drama movie Un/Happy for You, which was a massive box-office success.

In May 2025, Barretto joined as Eat Bulaga! co-host during Sugod Campus, Mga Kapatid! campus tour at Cavite State University - Don Severino delas Alas Campus. Prior to joining as roster of Dabarkads, she appeared as celebrity guest on Bawal Judgemental! segment.

In July 2026, Barretto parted ways with Viva Artists Agency to entering a new chapter in her career as an independently managed actress. She teamed up with Garcia once again in their seventh film together, Always Yours, Never Mine.

== Other activities ==
=== Philanthropy ===
In 2013, Barretto encouraged her fans to support her Charity Bazaar held at Capitol Golf Club, Capitol Hills, Old Balara, Quezon City, with proceeds supporting victims of Typhoon Yolanda. Her mother and siblings joined her Charity Bazaar event.

On April 7, 2020, Julia and her sisters Dani and Claudia launched a fund raising event #ParaMayBukas to fund an emergency quarantine facility to prevent overcrowding in the hospital. The Barretto sisters were able to raise more than 600,000 thousands pesos and half of the money were used to build a COVID-19 Quarantine Facility at Fe Del Mundo Medical Centre in Quezon City and the remaining 300,000 pesos were used to buy meals and PPE or Personal Protective Equipment for health-workers.

In March 2021, she joined Philippine Coast Guard (PCG) mission with her boyfriend Gerald Anderson, Lt. Commander of PCG in distributing relief goods to 300 Aeta families. In July of the same year, Barretto participated in another Philippine Coast Guard (PCG) relief mission with her boyfriend in distributing food packs to 100 families in San Antonio, Zambales.

In November 2024, Barretto was among of the celebrities who supported the Red Charity Gala which raised over 5 million pesos for the benefit of Hope for Lupus Foundation, Philippine Red Cross and Assumption High School Batch 1981 Foundation. She donated Christmas presents to 500 scholars at the charity event with Project Pearls Learning Center in December 2024.

She took part in Run to Share event organized by I Want to Share Foundation and was able to successfully raised 1 million pesos with all the proceeds donated to pediatric cancer patients at UP-Philippine General Hospital Pedia Hema-Onco Division in April 2025.

=== Philippine Coast Guard ===
Barretto joined Philippine Coast Guard (PCG) Auxiliary K9 Squadron Unit and holds the ranks of Auxiliary Ensign in September 2021. She promised to support the initiatives of the unit. She has been active in supporting several PCG relief missions.

=== Business endeavors ===
Barretto launched her accessory brand The Juju Club in November 2021, which sells retro clips, hats, eyewear, and rings among others.

== Personal life ==
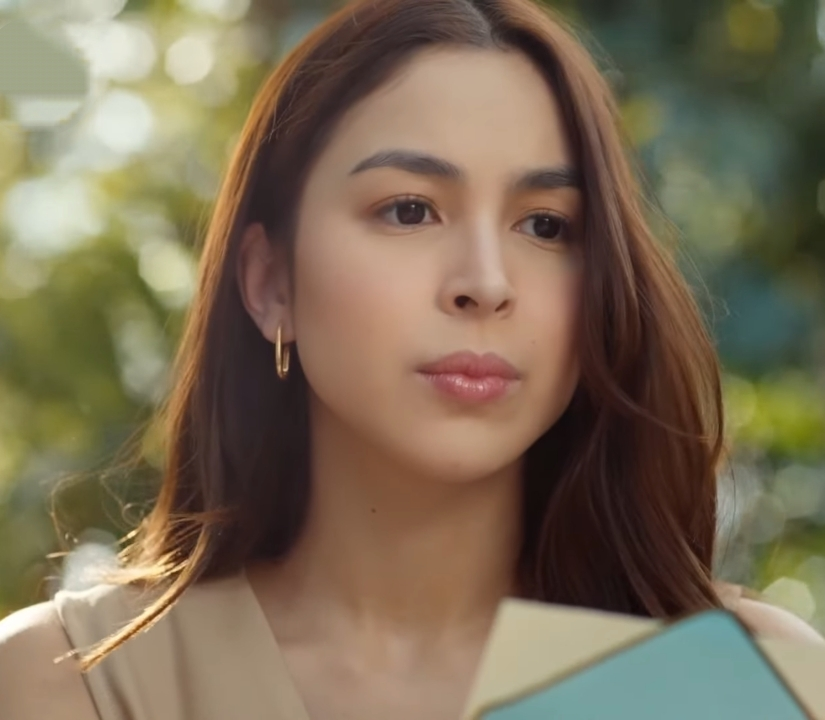
Barretto in 2024

She dated actor and perennial onscreen partner Joshua Garcia in 2017. Their relationship lasted for two years.

In 2021, Barretto was in a relationship with actor and Between Maybes co-star Gerald Anderson. The latter confirmed the relationship in an interview with Boy Abunda. On September 18, 2025, Star Magic confirmed that Barretto and Anderson had ended their relationship.

=== Health ===
In 2020, Barretto revealed that she had been suffering for five years from an anxiety disorder with freezing episodes which made her unable to talk, inability to move and lack of situational awareness. She said that she had visited a life coach and attended a support group to overcome her mental illness.

=== Legal actions ===
In 2013, Barretto filed a petition before the Quezon City Regional Trial Court to change her surname from Baldivia (her father's surname) to Barretto (her mother's surname). Her parents, actors Marjorie Barretto and Dennis Padilla were separated since 2007; their marriage was declared null and void in 2009 due to her father's bigamy based on NSO (National Statistic Office) records. Her representatives explained that this was to "prevent confusion" due to different surnames used in public and official records. As of 2021, Barretto reportedly still carried her father's surname in her contracts and business dealings.

In 2020, Barretto filed a legal complaint against former broadcaster Jay Sonza for cyber libel and violation of the Safe Spaces Act at the National Bureau of Investigation due to his malicious social media posts alleging her pregnancy.

== Filmography ==
Key
†	Denotes films that have not yet been released

=== Film ===
Year	Title	Role	Notes	Ref.
2015	Para sa Hopeless Romantic	Maria Kristina Lapuz	Main cast	
2016	Vince and Kath and James	Kathleen "Kath" Gonzales	Main cast	
2017	Love You to the Stars and Back	Mika	Main cast	
2017	Unexpectedly Yours	Yanni Gonzales	Main cast	
2017	Gandarrapiddo: The Revenger Squad	Chino's rescue	Guest appearance	
2018	I Love You, Hater	Zoey Rivera	Main cast	
2019	Between Maybes	Hazel Ilagan	Main cast	
2020	Block Z	PJ / Princess Joy	Main cast	
2020	James and Pat and Dave	Kathleen "Kath" Gonzales	Cameo	
2022	Bahay na Pula	Jane	Main cast	
2022	Expensive Candy	Candy	Main cast	
2023	Will You Be My Ex?	Chris	Main cast	
2024	Ikaw Pa Rin Ang Pipiliin Ko	Jas	Main cast	
2024	Un/Happy For You	Zy Angeles	Main cast	
2024	Hold Me Close	Lynlyn	Main cast	
2026	Always Yours, Never Mine	Luna Garchitorena	Main cast	
2026	Haunted Carnival †		Main cast	

=== Television ===
Year	Title	Role	Notes
2006	Gulong ng Palad	Isabelle	
2007	Walang Kapalit	Young Melanie Santillan	
2007	Kokey	Anna	
2008	Palos	Pamela Kiev	
2013	Wansapanataym: Bokbok, Ang Batang Mapanubok	Lily	
2013	Wansapanataym: Petrang Paminta	Petra	
2013	Maalaala Mo Kaya: Drawing	Alexandra "Alex"	
2013–present	ASAP	Herself	Performer
2014	Mirabella	Mira Amarillo / Bella Arboleda Robles	
2014	Maalaala Mo Kaya: Diary	Karen G. Nobleza	
2015	Wansapanataym: Wish Upon A Lusis	Joy	
2015	Maalaala Mo Kaya: Bracelet	Allysa	
2015	Maalaala Mo Kaya: Pink Dress	Abigail Marquez	
2015	Wansapanataym: Selfie Pa More, Sasha No More	Sasha Santillan	
2015–2016	And I Love You So	Patricia "Trixie" C. Valdez	
2017	A Love to Last	Chloe S. Noble	
2017	Maalaala Mo Kaya: Bituin	Aika Dare	
2018	Goin' Bulilit	Herself	Guest
2018–2019	Ngayon at Kailanman	Eva Mapendo / Angela Cortes	
2020	I Am U	Elise / Rose	
2020	Masked Singer Pilipinas	Herself	Guest judge
2021	Di Na Muli	Yanna	
2022	The Seniors	Diane	
2022–present	Eat Bulaga!	Herself	Co-host / performer
2024	Secret Ingredient	Maya	

== Awards and nominations ==
Awards and nominations received by Julia Barretto
Award (Note: Awards, festivals, honors and other miscellaneous organizations are listed in alphabetical order.)	Year (Note: Indicates the year of ceremony.)	Category	Nominated work	Result	Ref.
ALTA Media Icon Awards	2018	Best Loveteam (with Joshua Garcia)	Ngayon at Kailanman	Won	
Anak TV Seal Awards	2017	Makabata Star Award	Herself	Won	
Asian Television Awards	2024	Best Leading Female in a Digital Series	Secret Ingredient	Nominated	
Box Office Entertainment Awards	2017	Most Promising Movie Actress of the Year	Vince & Kath & James	Won	
Box Office Entertainment Awards	2018	Most Popular Love Team of Movies & Television (with Joshua Garcia)	Love You to the Stars and Back	Won	
Box Office Entertainment Awards	2019	Princess of Philippine Movies and Television	Ngayon at Kailanman	Won	
Candy Reader's Choice Awards	2014	Best TV Actress	Herself	Won	
The EDDYS Awards	2025	Box Office Hero	Herself	Won	
EdukCircle Awards	2018	Loveteam of the Year (with Joshua Garcia)	Herself	Won	
FAMAS Awards	2014	German Moreno Youth Achievement Award	Herself	Won	
FAMAS Awards	2016	Best Supporting Actress	Para sa Hopeless Romantic	Nominated	
FAMAS Awards	2018	Best Actress	Love You to the Stars and Back	Nominated	
FAMAS Awards	2018	Female Celebrity of the Night	Herself	Won	
Gawad Lasallianeta Awards	2023	Most Outstanding Film Actress	Expensive Candy	Won	
GEMS Hiyas ng Sining Awards	2019	Best Actress (TV Series)	Ngayon at Kailanman	Won	
Golden Laurel LPU Batangas Media Awards	2019	Best TV Actress	Ngayon at Kailanman	Won	
Luna Awards	2017	Best Actress	Vince & Kath & James	Nominated	
Luna Awards	2018	Best Actress	Love You to the Stars and Back	Nominated	
Platinum Stallion Media Awards	2017	Best Film Actress	Vince & Kath & James	Won	
PMPC Star Awards for Movies	2017	Movie Loveteam of the Year (with Joshua Garcia)	Vince & Kath & James	Nominated	
PMPC Star Awards for Movies	2017	Movie Loveteam of the Year (with Ronnie Alonte)	Vince & Kath & James	Nominated	
PMPC Star Awards for Movies	2018	Movie Love Team of the Year (with Joshua Garcia)	Love You to the Stars and Back	Won	
PMPC Star Awards for Movies	2018	Movie Supporting Actress of the Year	Unexpectedly Yours	Nominated	
PMPC Star Awards for Movies	2019	Movie Love Team of the Year (with Joshua Garcia)	I Love You, Hater	Nominated	
PMPC Star Awards for Movies	2021	Movie Love Team of the Year (with Gerald Anderson)	Between Maybes	Nominated	
PMPC Star Awards for Movies	2022	Movie Loveteam of the Year (with Joshua Garcia)	Block Z	Nominated	
PMPC Star Awards for Television	2017	Best Single Performance by an Actress	Maalaala Mo Kaya ("Bituin" episode)	Nominated	
PMPC Star Awards for Television	2017	German Moreno Power Tandem Award (with Joshua Garcia)	Herself	Won	
PMPC Star Awards for Television	2018	Female Star of the Night	Herself	Won	
Star Magic Ball Special Awards	2012	Princess of the Night	Herself	Won	
Star Magic Ball Special Awards	2014	Best Dressed	Herself	Won	
Star Magic Ball Special Awards	2017	Belle of the Ball	Herself	Won	
Yahoo! Celebrity Awards	2014	Female Emerging Star of The Year	Herself	Won	
YouTube Creator Awards	2020	Silver Play Button	Herself	Won	
YouTube Creator Awards	2021	Gold Play Button	Herself	Won	
