= Jason Paul Laxamana =

Filipino filmmaker and writer

- Born: 1987 or 1988 (age 38–39)
- Education: University of the Philippines
- Occupations: Film director, writer

Jason Paul Laxamana (born 1987 or 1988) is a Filipino filmmaker and writer.

== Early life and education ==
Laxamana, a native of Angeles City, Pampanga, studied at the University of the Philippines Diliman where he pursued a degree in broadcast communication.

== Career ==
Laxamana started his career in the entertainment industry as a volunteer production assistant in one of the episodes of Maalaala Mo Kaya directed by Jeffrey Jeturian. He also worked as personal assistant and stage manager of events by another director, Maryo J. de los Reyes.

He worked as a script continuity for Maroy's A Love Story and as script contuinity again and local coordinator in Brillante Mendoza's Serbis which was filmed in Laxamana's home province of Pampanga.

Laxamana created several Kapampangan short films, documentaries and music videos which was showcased in both Pampanga and Metro Manila. The short film Balangingi was named ETC Best Short Film in the 1st Philippine Digital Awards in 2009. While Cool Me Up, Please! is a finalist in the Video Category of the World Bank International Essay Competition in France of the same year. He also worked as the coordinator of the Pampanga block of the annual Cinema Rehiyon Film Festival.

Laxamana's film, Astro Mayabang, received a Special Mention and the Audience Choice Award at the 2010 Cinema One Originals Film Festival.

He is known for directing romance films; among these are 100 Tula Para Kay Stella, Just a Stranger, and Between Maybes. He stuck with this genre for his "survival" in the film industry.

The 2023 action adventure film Penduko is a deviation from his usual genre, which he considers as his first "mainstream" film where he incorporate various aspects of his interests.

== Personal life ==
Laxamana is a late-diagnosed autistic person. He was diagnosed as having Asperger's syndrome in 2023 at 36 years old. Among the examples on how his autism manifest is his aversion to new clothing especially formal ones, tendency to get sensory overload from noises made by vehicles, and the need of people not to distract him when working.

== Filmography ==
=== Films ===
Year	Title	Director	Writer	Notes
2010	Astro Mayabang	Yes	Yes	
2013	Babagwa	Yes	Yes	
2014	Magkakabaung	Yes	Yes	
2016	Love Is Blind	Yes	Yes	
2016	Ang Taba Ko Kasi	Yes	Yes	
2016	Mercury Is Mine	Yes	Yes	
2016	2 Cool 2 Be 4gotten	No	Yes	
2016	The Third Party	Yes	No	
2017	Pwera Usog	Yes	Yes	
2017	Instalado	Yes	Yes	
2017	100 Tula Para Kay Stella	Yes	Yes	
2017	Fallback	Yes	Yes	
2018	So Connected	Yes	Yes	
2018	The Day After Valentine's	Yes	Yes	
2018	Bakwit Boys	Yes	Yes	
2018	To Love Some Buddy	Yes	Yes	
2019	Between Maybes	Yes	Yes	
2019	Just a Stranger	Yes	Yes	
2019	Ang Henerasyong Sumuko Sa Love	Yes	Yes	
2020	He Who Is Without Sin	Yes	Yes	
2022	Expensive Candy	Yes	Yes	
2023	Penduko	Yes	Yes	
2024	Hold Me Close	Yes	Yes	
2025	Sosyal Climbers	Yes	Yes	
2025	100 Awit Para Kay Stella	Yes	Yes	
2025	Minamahal: 100 Bulaklak Para Kay Luna	Yes	Yes	
