= LuzViMinda (song) =

Single by Alamat

from the album Destino
- Language: Bicolano; Cebuano; English; Ilocano; Kapampangan; Tagalog; Waray
- Released: November 7, 2025
- Genre: Hip-hop
- Length: 3:28
- Label: Viva
- Songwriter: Alamat
- Producer: Alas Alvarez

Alamat singles chronology
"Rock Baby with Mrld" (2025)	"LuzViMinda" (2025)	"Hapag" (2025)

Music video
- "LuzViMinda" on YouTube

"LuzViMinda" (Note: "LuzViMinda" is a portmanteau of Luzon, Visayas, and Mindanao, the names of the three major island groups of the Philippines.) is a song by the Filipino boy band Alamat. It is a hip-hop song that incorporates indigenous Philippine instruments, namely the gabbang and kubing. Lyrically, it is about striving to reach one's full potential while being proud of their Filipino roots. The song is written in several Philippine languages—Bicolano, Cebuano, Ilocano, Kapampangan, Tagalog, and Waray—as well as English, with lyrics by Alamat and production by member Alas Alvarez.

The song was released under Viva Records as a digital pre-release single on November 7, 2025. The music video, which depicts the Alamat members as ordinary citizens living in the Fort Bonifacio Tenement, was released on November 12. Its director Judd Figuerres drew inspiration from the visuals in American rapper Kendrick Lamar's 2017 album Damn. Critics generally praised the song for its lyrics. Julienne Loreto of the British music magazine The Line of Best Fit favorably compared the song to "Tokyo Drift" by Teriyaki Boyz and Blackpink's "Pink Venom". "LuzViMinda" is also a track on Alamat's second album Destino (lit. 'Destination'), which was released on November 21.

It is a part of the soundtrack for the mystery horror series Hell University (2026). "LuzViMinda" and its music video were nominated for two categories at the 11th P-pop Music Awards, winning Song of the Year.

== Background and release ==
Sometime in 2024, Mo Mitchell—a member of the Filipino boy band Alamat—began drafting the song "LuzViMinda". The group later shared their musical drafts with one another in a meeting, and they agreed to develop Mitchell's composition further. In December, at their solo concert Ragasa (lit. 'Rush'), Alamat announced their second studio album Destino (lit. 'Destination'), which was set to be released in 2025.

On October 20, they announced that they would release "LuzViMinda", the title track from Destino, on November 7 and the album itself on November 21 at the MassKara Festival in Bacolod City. In the same month, the Alamat members attended the Filipino Music Awards 2025 wearing T-shirts covering their faces except for their eyes, inspired by the ski masks worn by manual laborers in the Philippines. Deemed a "fascinating stunt" by The Line of Best Fit, this was done to promote "Luzviminda". On October 23, the group began posting teaser images for the album inspired by everyday life in the Philippines, with creative direction and production by Alamat member Jao Canlas. From October 31 to November 2, the group also released handwritten lyric teasers confirming that "LuzViMinda" is a multilingual song containing verses in each member's native language.

== Composition and lyrics ==
"LuzViMinda"
A 10-second sample of "LuzViMinda", where the chorus can be heard. It contains Cebuano lyrics like "walay makapugong" (transl. nothing can stop [me]).

The track is three minutes and twenty-eight seconds. It is a hip-hop song that uses the indigenous Philippine instruments gabbang and kubing. It was written by all of Alamat, and produced by member Alas Alvarez.

Lyrically, the song is about being proud of growing up in the Philippines. For instance, in one verse, Alamat's Jao Canlas raps about his Kapampangan ethnic identity. The track contains lyrics in English and each member's native language: Bicolano, Cebuano, Ilocano, Kapampangan, Tagalog, and Waray.

== Critical reception ==
In a track-by-track review of the Alamat album Destino, Julienne Loreto of the British music magazine The Line of Best Fit commended the "richness" of "LuzViMinda", comparing it favorably to "Tokyo Drift" by Teriyaki Boyz for its use of Southeast Asian percussion instruments and "sharp" lyrics; as well as "Pink Venom" by Blackpink for its "delightfully brash" production. Pulp's Andrea Dee and Scout's Pauline Miranda both opined that the track reinforces Alamat's musical identity, as well as their commitment to their advocacy of championing Filipino culture and diversity. Mian Centeno of Art+ called the song a "roaring declaration" of the group's multilingualism and "refusal to dilute Filipino identity" in their music. In their year-end Favorite P-pop Songs list, the staff of Pulp reiterated their love for the song, lauding its use of several Philippine languages as well as native instruments.

Andros Resurreccion of &Asian wrote that the song would be a suitable fit for WWE's event Backlash. He also suggested that the event could celebrate performers of half-Filipino heritage, including Batista and Jeff Cobb. Filipino music magazine The Flying Lugaw included "LuzViMinda" in their "200 Filipino Songs in the Last 25 Years" list in 2026. In the same year, the track won Song of the Year at the 11th P-pop Music Awards.

== Music video ==
The music video was directed by Judd Figuerres and released on November 12, 2025. It features various settings including a computer shop, sari-sari store, basketball court, and jeepneys, with members dressed in sandos and jerseys. Alamat member Jao Canlas choreographed the song's chorus; Eli De San Andres, a member of the boy band Xerenade, also contributed to the choreography.

The initial concept for the video involved a stylized environment blending Japanese and Filipino aesthetics, created with the help of CGI animation; however, it was scrapped due to budget constraints. A lyric in the song, "Lumaki 'to sa Pinas" (transl. Grew up in the Philippines), inspired a new concept more grounded in reality, in which the Alamat members all grew up in the Fort Bonifacio Tenement in Taguig. The Tenement is a public housing complex built in the 1960s; its community has faced eviction since 2010 due to safety concerns. For the video, Figuerres drew inspiration from the visuals in American rapper Kendrick Lamar's 2017 album Damn.

== Other uses ==
In 2026, "LuzViMinda" was included in the soundtrack for Hell University, a mystery horror series.

== Awards and nominations ==
Awards and nominations for "LuzViMinda"
Organization	Year	Category	Result	Ref.
P-pop Music Awards	2026	Song of the Year	Won	
P-pop Music Awards	2026	Music Video of the Year	Nominated	

== Listicles ==
Publisher	Year	Listicle	Placement	Ref.
&Asian	2026	10 Songs That Could Be on a Soundtrack to WWE PPV/PLE	Placed	
When in Manila	2025	7 New Songs and Albums by Alamat, YGIG, and More That We're Putting on Repeat	Placed	
When in Manila	2025	6 P-pop Songs You Should Play at Your New Year's Eve Parties	Placed	
The Flying Lugaw	2026	200 Filipino Songs in the Last 25 Years	Placed	
GMA News	2025	Bini, Alamat, and more: Here are 5 new OPM songs to listen to	Placed	
Pulp	2025	Eight P-pop Hits for the Streets	Placed	
Pulp	2025	Pulp Loves: Our Favorite P-pop Songs of 2025	Placed	

== Personnel ==
Credits are adapted from an official listing on YouTube.

- Alamat – lead vocals; lyrics
- Alas Alvarez – production; arrangement; mixing; mastering
- Eightkidd – recording
- Zeb Zuñiga – vocal coaching
