= Destino (Alamat album) =

Studio album by Alamat
- Released: November 21, 2025
- Genre: Hip-hop; bubblegum pop; disco; funk; synth-pop; UK garage
- Length: 26:21
- Language: Bicolano; Cebuano; English; Ilocano; Kapampangan; Tagalog; Waray
- Label: Viva
- Producer: Alas Alvarez; Elijah Compton; Jason Paul Laxamana; Roland Lim Shi Jie; Jovel Rivera; Bruce Weigner

Alamat chronology
Isapuso (2023)	Destino (2025)

Singles from Destino
- 1. "Hiraya" Released: November 20, 2024; 2. "Sa'Yo Pa Rin Uuwi" Released: December 13, 2024; 3. "LuzViMinda" Released: November 7, 2025; 4. "Hapag" Released: November 26, 2025

Destino (transl. Destination; stylized in all caps) is the second studio album by the Filipino boy band Alamat. It was released on November 21, 2025, through Viva Records. It contains eight tracks and "LuzViMinda" released as a single. Its tracks were produced by Jason Paul Laxamana, Alas Alvarez, Elijah Compton, and Jovel Rivera, as well as Bruce Weigner and Roland Lim Shi Jie of The Kennel.

== Background ==
On November 20, 2024, the Filipino boy band Alamat (transl. Legend) released a new single called "Hiraya" (transl. Dream), followed by its music video on November 22. On December 6, at their second solo concert Ragasa (transl. Rush), the group announced that they would release two new songs, "Champorado" (Note: The title refers to a sweet chocolate rice porridge in Philippine cuisine.) and "Sa 'Yo Pa Rin Uuwi" (transl. I'll Still Come Home To You), for their upcoming album Destino (transl. Destination). "Uuwi" was released as a single on December 13. The album's release was delayed.

Destino took more than a year to finalize. Alamat's Mo Mitchell began writing "Sinigang", the album's second track, in 2022.

== Promotion and release ==
On August 24, 2025, the group began posting a mini documentary series to promote Destino. When in Manila's Andrea Posadas noted that these clips were markedly different from the group's typical "highly conceptual" teasers. In the clips, Alamat expressed their anxieties about the future of the group. For example, member Alas Alvarez mentioned in his individual teaser that he noticed Alamat's monthly listeners on Spotify dropping from more than one million to just 400,000.

On October 20, 2025, they announced that they would release "LuzViMinda", the lead single from Destino, on November 7 and the album itself on November 21 at the MassKara Festival in Bacolod City. In the same month, the group wore T-shirts as ski masks on the Filipino Music Awards red carpet, which was a stunt to promote the single. The imagery is inspired by laborers in the Philippines, who often use shirts as masks to protect themselves from the sun. On October 23, the group began posting teaser images inspired by everyday life in the Philippines, with creative direction and production by Alamat member Jao Canlas. They also continued to release mini documentary clips further revealing the album's creative process, lyric spoilers, and a glimpse into the group's lives behind the scenes.

Destino was released on November 21, containing eight tracks: "LuzViMinda", "Sinigang", "Pagbigyan (Bad Decisions)", "Pangako (Sa Puso Mo)", "Hapag", "Don't Wanna Dance", "Hiraya", and "Sa 'Yo Pa Rin Uuwi". "Champorado", originally announced as a part of the album, was rejected by the group's label Viva Records. On November 23, Alamat held a live showcase for the album at the Backyard Warehouse Studio in Quezon City. On November 24, they performed songs from Destino in the Wish Bus at the Riverbanks Center North Triangle in Marikina City. The group released a music video for "Hapag", the album's next single, on November 26.

== Composition and lyrics ==
The album's first track and lead single, "LuzViMinda", is a hip-hop song with electronic and trap elements, also incorporating the Philippine instruments gabbang (bamboo xylophone) and kubing (jaw harp). "Don't Wanna Dance" has been described as a mid-tempo UK garage and pop track containing kick and snare drums, as well as "bright" guitar. "Hiraya" has been identified as a funk, synth-pop, disco, and bubblegum pop song. "Sinigang" and "Sa 'Yo Pa Rin Uuwi" have been described as ballads, while "Hapag" and "Pagbigyan (Bad Decisions)" have been described as R&B tracks. The Line of Best Fit's Julienne Loreto said that Destino is musically split between ballads and more intense tracks. According to Zeen Media's Francesca Bacordo, the album "sits firmly within R&B".

"LuzViMinda" contains lyrics in each of the members' native languages: Bicolano, Cebuano, Ilocano, Kapampangan, Tagalog, and Waray, as well as English. Its title is short for "Luzon, Visayas, and Mindanao". According to When in Manila's Andrea Posadas, the song highlights the Philippines' diverse culture.

== Reception ==
Professional ratings
Review scores
Source	Rating
The Line of Best Fit	8/10 stars

Destino received favorable reviews from critics. Julienne Loreto of the British music magazine The Line of Best Fit gave Destino a score of 8 out of 10. They described the album as a "joyride" that provided "depth" and "beauty" while still being "fun", though they criticized "Hiraya" for being "disco-lite mush" and "Don't Wanna Dance" for being generic. Mary Ann Gustilo of Pulp wrote that the album shows Alamat's authenticity. Art+ Magazine's Mian Centeno wrote that the album "cements Alamat's legacy". Tatler Asia included Destino in their list of nine albums that "defined" 2025, with writer Christofer Palentino praising it for "jumping between genres with confidence".

Commercially, Destino entered iTunes Philippines' Top Albums chart from November 21 to November 23. The album was also projected to enter Billboard Philippines' charts. (Note: It did not.)

== Track listing ==
Destino track listing
No.	Title	Writer(s)	Producer(s)	Length
1.	"LuzViMinda"	Mo Mitchell; Jao Canlas; Taneo Sebastian; Alas Alvarez; Ralph Joseph Lim; Tomas Rodriguez	Alvarez	3:28
2.	"Sinigang"	Mitchell; Rodriguez; Sebastian	Alvarez	3:12
3.	"Hapag"	Alvarez; Canlas; Lim; Mitchell; Sebastian	Alvarez	2:57
4.	"Pagbigyan (Bad Decisions)"	Alvarez; Canlas; Lim; Mitchell; Rodriguez; Sebastian	The Kennel	3:34
5.	"Pangako (Sa Puso Mo)"	Alvarez; Canlas; Lim; Mitchell; Rodriguez; Sebastian	The Kennel	3:28
6.	"Don't Wanna Dance"	Alvarez; Canlas; Lim; Mitchell; Rodriguez; Sebastian	The Kennel	2:44
7.	"Hiraya"	Kylu Garcia; Matt Wilson	Jovel Rivera	3:18
8.	"Sa 'Yo Pa Rin Uuwi"	Jason Paul Laxamana; Marion Aunor; Lim	Laxamana	3:40
Total length:				26:21

== Listicles ==
Name of publisher, year listed, name of listicle, and placement
Publisher	Year	Listicle	Placement	Ref.
Billboard Philippines	2025	Fans Pick Their Favorite Songs and Albums of 2025	Placed (Note: It was picked by their fans as Favorite Albums of 2025.)	

== Personnel ==
Credits are adapted from Tidal, with additional information from other sources. (Note: Apple Music and articles by The Line of Best Fit and Billboard Philippines)

- Alamat – vocals; lyrics (1, 4, 5, 6)
  - Alas Alvarez – production (1, 2, 3); lyrics (3)
  - Jao Canlas – lyrics (3)
  - Ralph Joseph Lim – guitar (3); lyrics (3, 8)
  - Mo Mitchell – lyrics (2, 3)
  - Tomas Rodriguez – flute (3); lyrics (2)
  - Taneo Sebastian – lyrics (2, 3)
- Bruce Weigner for the Kennel AB – production (4); composition (4)
- Josefin Glenmark Breman for the Kennel AB – composition (4)
- Roland Lim Shi Jie for the Kennel AB – production (5, 6); composition (6); lyrics (6)
- Gaston – lyrics (6); composition (6)
- Marion Aunor – lyrics (6, 8); composition (6, 8)
- Elijah Compton – production (7)
- Jovel Rivera – production (7)
- Kylu Garcia – lyrics (7); composition (7)
- Matt Wilson – lyrics (7); composition (7)
- Jason Paul Laxamana – production (8); lyrics (8); composition (8)
