= List of Stars on the Floor episodes =

Stars on the Floor is an on-going Philippine dance reality competition created by Romer Gonzales and Johnny Manahan which is broadcast by GMA Network starting 2025. The dance reality show are hosted by Alden Richards with Lexi Gonzales and Shan Vesagas served as livestream hosts.

The first season, the dance competition were between celebrity dancers and internet personalities with Marian Rivera, Pokwang and SB19 Coach Jay Joseph Roncesvalles served as The Judge Panel and Dance Authorities.

In second season, the dance reality highlighted between celebrity dancers and P-pop dancers with Marian Rivera and Jay Joseph Roncesvalles returning for season 2. Pokwang exited from the dance show and was replaced by Rayver Cruz as the new judge.

== Season 1 (2025) ==
=== Contestants ===
- Rodjun Cruz - Winner
- Glaiza de Castro - Runner-Up
- Thea Astley - Finalist
- Faith da Silva - Finalist
- Zeus Collins - Finalist
- Dasuri Choi - Winner
- JM Yvrrevere - Runner-Up
- Patrick Rocamora - Finalist
- Joshua Decena - Finalist
- Kakai Almeda - Finalist

=== Episodes ===
No.	Title	Original air date
1	Pilot	June 28, 2025
2	Dance Universe	July 5, 2025
3	Hataw	July 19, 2025
4	Showdown	July 26, 2025
5	Dance Off	August 2, 2025
6	Paandar	August 9, 2025
7	Dance Stars Duo	August 16, 2025
8	Tatak Pinoy	August 23, 2025
9	At the Movies	August 30, 2025
10	Around the World	September 6, 2025
11	Folk Collab	September 13, 2025
12	Feel na feel	September 20, 2025
13	Elements	September 27, 2025
14	Time Travel	October 4, 2025
15	Obstacles	October 11, 2025
16	The Final Dance Battle	October 18, 2025

== Season 2 (2026) ==
=== Contestants ===
- Sugar Mercado - Winner
- Chanty - Runner-up
- Jasmine Curtis Smith - Finalist
- Rocco Nacino - Finalist
- Paul Salas - Finalist
- Jeromy - Hori7on - Winner
- Jao - Alamat - Runner-up
- Joker - 1st.One - Finalist
- Sofia - Kaia - Finalist
- Denise - Calista - Finalist

=== Episodes ===
No.	Title	Original air date
1	Stars on the Floor is Back	February 15, 2026
2	Labanan na	February 22, 2026
3	Collab Hataw	March 1, 2026
4	Intense Laban	March 8, 2026
5	Pasabog	March 15, 2026
6	Mas pinatindi	March 22, 2026
7	Prop Sayaw	March 29, 2026
8	Videoke Dance Night	April 5, 2026
9	Dance Icon	April 12, 2026
10	Hataw Night	April 19, 2026
11	World Dance Fest	April 26, 2026
12	Kwentong Pinoy	May 3, 2026
13	Sine Sayaw	May 10, 2026
14	Coach Collab	May 17, 2026
15	Trio Labanan	May 24, 2026
16	Final Dance Battle	May 31, 2026
