= Hulog =

Single by Kaia
- Language: Tagalog
- English title: Fall
- Released: June 26, 2026
- Genre: Synth-pop; synth-rock
- Length: 2:51
- Label: Sony
- Composers: Jikamarie; Red Ridao; Ron Pangyarihan; Shadiel Chan
- Producers: Shadiel Chan; Ken Ponce

Kaia singles chronology
"Tara Sayaw" (2025)	"Hulog" (2026)

Music video
- "Hulog" on YouTube

"Hulog" (lit. 'Fall'; stylized in all lowercase) is a song recorded by the Filipino girl group Kaia. Released on June 26, 2026 as a single, the track is a synth-pop and synth-rock song drawing inspiration from new wave music, with Tagalog lyrics about falling in love. Jikamarie, Red Ridao, Ron Pangyarihan, and Shadiel Chan are credited for its lyric and composition, and Chan for its production alongside Ken Ponce.

The song received positive reviews from critics. Cris O. Ramos Jr. of One Music Philippines rated it four stars out of five, and Julienne Loreto of &Asian called it a "real beauty and banger".

== Promotion and release ==
On June 26, 2026, "Hulog" was released under Sony. On the same day, the group performed "Hulog" at Nescafé Fusion: The Philippine Music Festival and in July, performed it at the Binibining Pilipinas 2026 pageant. The official music video, depicting the members as angels wandering through a forest, premiered at the group's Kazaiahan Fest event held at the SM North EDSA Skydome on July 4 prior to its wide release on July 5.

== Composition and lyrics ==
Musically, "Hulog" has been described as a synth-pop and synth-rock song that draws inspiration from the new wave genre. It incorporates "strong" drums, guitars, and synthesizers. The song was produced by Shadiel Chan, who previously worked on "Multo" (lit. 'Ghost') by Cup of Joe, and Ken Ponce.

The song's lyrics are written in Tagalog, discussing feelings of thrill, vulnerability, and hope at the beginning of a romantic relationship. Jikamarie, Red Ridao, Ron Pangyarihan, and Chan are credited for the lyrics. The Kaia members' personal experiences reportedly contributed to the song's "emotional direction" as well.

== Reception ==
=== Critic reviews ===
Professional ratings
Review scores
Source	Rating
One Music Philippines	4/5 stars

Cris O. Ramos Jr. of One Music Philippines rated "Hulog" four stars out of five, saying that it effectively captures "the unspeakable happiness and consuming feeling" of romance. He also praised Shadiel Chan's "clean" production. Writing for the Philippine Daily Inquirer's Lifestyle section, Carl Martin Agustin called the track a "dreamy summer bop" and "kilig in song form".

Fairlane Raymundo of Asian Entertainment and Culture said that the song represents a "gradual" artistic evolution for Kaia, rather than a "dramatic" reinvention, hailing the track as "polished" pop that emphasizes the group's individual vocal tones. Julienne Loreto of &Asian complimented the song's rock-influenced production and described it as a "real beauty and banger". Andrea Posadas of When in Manila said that the song adds a "dose of whimsy" to P-pop. "Hulog" appeared in the curated listicles "A yearner's soundtrack" (Inquirer Lifestyle) and "We're Turning Up the Volume on These 10 New P-pop Songs by Kaia, Mei Mei, and More" by When in Manila.

== Personnel ==
Credits adapted from Tidal

- Kaia – vocals
- Jikamarie – lyrics and composition
- Red Ridao – lyrics and composition
- Ron Pangyarihan – lyrics and composition
- Shadiel Chan – lyrics, composition, and production
- Ken Ponce – production
