= Alas Alvarez =

Filipino singer-rapper (born 2001)

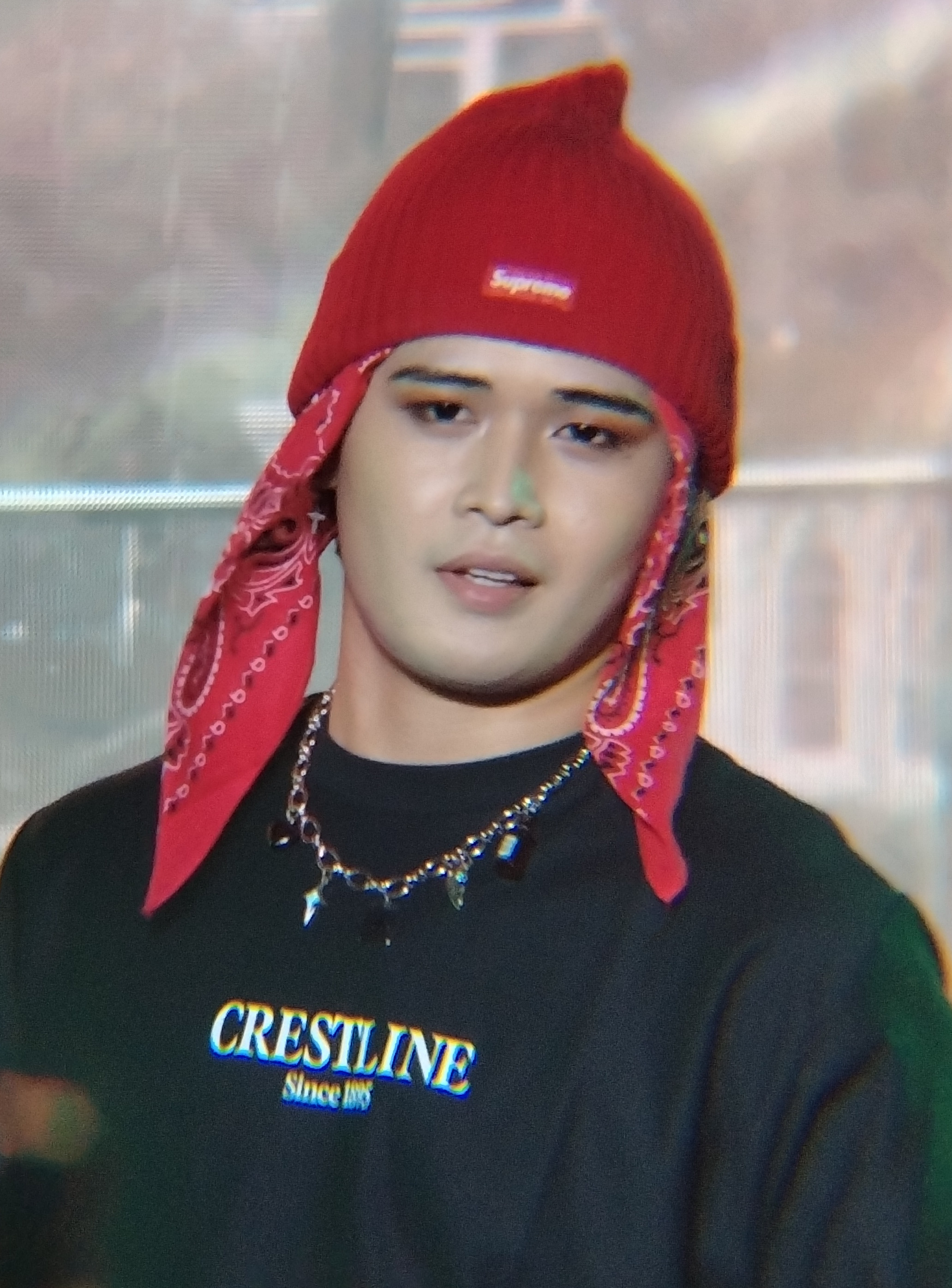
- Alvarez in July 2025
- Born: Joshua Magsilong Alvarez; March 28, 2001 (age 25); Davao City, Philippines
- Occupations: Rapper; singer; songwriter; record producer; actor
- Years active: 2020–present
- Musical career
- Genres: P-pop; Visayan pop; Hip-hop
- Label: Viva
- Member of: Alamat

Joshua Magsilong Alvarez (born March 28, 2001), also known professionally as Alas Alvarez or simply Alas (stylized in all caps), is a Filipino rapper, singer, songwriter, record producer, and actor. He is the lead rapper of the P-pop boy band Alamat, who are known for their multilingual, multicultural advocacy. Alvarez is the group's representative for Cebuano (Note: This language is more widely known by its endonym, Bisaya.) speakers. He is the first active member of Alamat to release a solo single with "Don't Play", a hip-hop track written in Cebuano, Tagalog, and English released on February 7, 2025.

In 2026, Alvarez was revealed as a cast member in Hell University, a mystery horror series. He portrays Luke, a "dangerous" member of the fictional Black Blood Gang.

== Early life and education ==
Joshua Magsilong Alvarez was born on March 28, 2001 in Davao City. He is of Visayan and Tausūg descent. He dropped out of eighth grade to work and support his family.

Before debuting in Alamat, Alvarez had various jobs, such as construction work. He dabbled in runway modeling pre-debut as well. He was also a youth coordinator for Let's Do It! Philippines in Davao, a grassroots environmental campaign with a focus on uplifting the Lumad (Indigenous ethnic groups in Mindanao). He also trained in sports such as sepak takraw, kickboxing, and MMA.

== Career ==
=== 2020–present: Joining Alamat and solo work ===
Alvarez was the final member to be added to Alamat's line-up. He joined the boy band when the other members had already undergone training, so their manager repeatedly told Alvarez that he had many things he needed to catch up on. Alamat officially debuted on February 14, 2021 with the multilingual song "Kbye" (stylized in all lowercase). He was given the position of lead rapper in the group and became their representative for Cebuano (Bisaya) speakers. In a feature by Vice News, Alvarez was quoted as saying, "For many years, especially in Luzon, Visayan or the Visayan accent, has often been used as a device for comedy. In our own little way, through the music of Alamat, we seek to contribute in reversing this[…] portrayal of not just Visayans but 'probinsyanos' (people from the countryside) in general. Seeing 'Kbye' reach a large number of people gives me the feeling that we are on the right track."

Alvarez has several songwriting, production, mixing, and mastering credits. He spoke of his process in an interview with Teen Vogue, explaining, "I'm personally the one in charge of beats so I like looking up and including local instruments when I can, like the kudyapi or kulintang." On November 30, 2023, Alvarez won Top Male Rapper of the Year at the 8th P-pop Music Awards.

On February 2, 2025, Viva first announced Alvarez' solo debut, "Don't Play", a hip-hop track with lyrics in Cebuano, Tagalog, and English. The lyrics are from the perspective of a man in love with a woman who plays games with him emotionally. He hopes for her to stop playing those games and be honest about how she feels about him, hence the title "Don't Play". Alvarez wrote, produced, mixed, mastered, and engineered the song by himself.

On February 6, a day before the song's release, Alvarez held a launch event for "Don't Play" at Atmosfera, a nightclub in Poblacion, Makati. Fellow Viva artist Yen Durano (also known as Yennybooo) and the other members of Alamat joined him at the event. In an interview with Billboard Philippines, Alvarez revealed that "Don't Play" had already been composed in 2021 or 2022, but had undergone many changes through the years. He also shared that his plan was to release a solo album or extended play, but decided that he would release a song every one or two months instead to avoid feeling pressure. Alvarez also released a lyric visualizer video for "Don't Play", which he conceptualized. Samantha Radaza of the Visayan magazine Kasing2 praised the song for leaning into its simple boy-meets-girl narrative without overcomplicating it, as well as Alvarez' songwriting and "charismatic" performance.

In 2025, he was nominated for P-pop Favorite Rapper of the Year at the 10th P-pop Music Awards.

In 2026, Alvarez was revealed as a cast member in season one of Hell University, a mystery horror series. He portrays Luke, a "dangerous" member of the fictional Black Blood Gang. Writing for Kasing2, Radaza named his performance as one of the season's best. Calling him a "screen presence that is difficult to ignore", she stated that his portrayal seemed to be that of a formally trained actor's even though it was his television debut.

== Discography ==
=== As lead artist ===
Title	Year	Album	Ref.
"Don't Play"	2025	Non-album single	

=== Songwriting and production credits ===
List of songs, showing year released, artist name, and name of the album
Title	Year	Artist	Album	Credits	References
"Kbye"	2021	Alamat	Non-album single	Lyrics	
"ABKD"	2022	Alamat	Pasulong	Lyrics, composition	
"Hala"	2022	Alamat	Pasulong	Lyrics, composition	
"Gayuma"	2023	Alamat	Pasulong	Lyrics, composition	
"Noli"	2023	Alamat	Isapuso	Production	
"Manila Dreams"	2023	Alamat	Isapuso	Lyrics, composition	
"Dong-Dong-Ay"	2023	Alamat	Isapuso	Mixing and mastering	
"Gupit"	2024	The Juans and Alamat	Non-album single	Lyrics, composition	
"Ngayong Gabi"	2024	Alamat and Nik Makino	Coke Studio Philippines Season 8	Lyrics, composition	
"Don't Play"	2025	Alas	Non-album single	Lyrics, composition, production, mixing, and mastering	
"Rock Baby"	2025	Alamat and Mrld	Coke Studio Philippines Season 9	Lyrics	
"LuzViMinda"	2025	Alamat	Destino	Lyrics, composition, and production	
"Sinigang"	2025	Alamat	Destino	Production	
"Hapag"	2025	Alamat	Destino	Lyrics, composition, and production	
"Summer Blue"	2026	Pixie	Non-album single	Arranging, composition, production, mixing, and mastering	

== Filmography ==
Key
†	Denotes films that have not yet been released

=== Television ===
Year	Title	Role	Ref.
2026	Hell University	Luke	

=== Online/Digital ===
Year	Title	Role	Ref.
2025	Billboard Philippines Volumes	Himself	

=== Music videos ===
Year	Title	Artist	Ref.
2025	"Don't Play"	Alas	

== Awards and nominations ==
Award	Year	Category	Nominee(s)	Result	Ref.
P-pop Music Awards	2023	Top Male Rapper of the Year	Alas	Won	
P-pop Music Awards	2025	P-pop Favorite Rapper of the Year	Alas	Nominated	
JuanCast	2025	Mic Drop! Greatest Laughs: Funniest P-Pop Member	Alas	Nominated	
JuanCast	2025	Soloist You Stan The Most	Alas	Nominated	
