= Barakofest =

Annual festival in Lipa, Batangas

- Status: Active
- Genre: Multi-genre (Music, Arts, Food, Motoring)
- Dates: March (typically)
- Locations: Lipa City, Batangas
- Country: Philippines
- Years active: 3 (as of 2025)
- Organizer: Mentorque Productions

Barakofest (also spelled as Barako Fest) is an annual festival held in Lipa, Batangas, Philippines. The event features music concerts, art exhibits, trade fairs, and motorsport competitions. It is organized by Mentorque Productions in cooperation with the local government of Batangas. The festival was established to promote tourism and local products from the Batangas province.

== History ==
=== 2024 ===
The 2024 edition of the festival took place from March 14 to March 16. It was held in Lipa City and opened by former Batangas Governor Vilma Santos. The organizers estimated an attendance of 200,000 visitors. The event included activities such as an art festival, a trade fair, and a "Drift Fest" for cars.

=== 2025 ===
The third edition of the festival occurred from February 13 to February 15, 2025. It was held along the Manila-Batangas Bypass Road in Barangay Marawoy. The opening of the festival coincided with the inauguration of Section 3 of the bypass road. A groundbreaking ceremony was also held for "The Bean at Barako Triangle", a park featuring a structure shaped like a coffee bean.

Performers at the 2025 music festival included Juan Karlos, Arthur Nery, Al James, and Nik Makino. The event also featured a meet-and-greet with content creators. The organizers targeted an attendance of 300,000 people for this edition.

=== 2026 ===
The festival is scheduled to return from March 26 to March 28, 2026. The band Ben&Ben was announced as the first headlining artist. The tagline for the 2026 event is "Feel the Energy".

== Program and Activities ==
The festival is divided into specific zones or "fests" to cater to different interests.

- Music Fest: This section features concerts by local bands, DJs, and solo artists.
- Trade Fest: This area showcases products and delicacies from various municipalities in Batangas. Approximately 500 small business enterprises participated in previous editions.
- Food Fest: This zone hosts food concessionaires. The 2025 edition included over 400 stalls.
- Art Fest: This section displays art installations and exhibits by local Batangueño artists.
- Motoring Events: The festival includes a "Drift Fest" for drifting exhibitions, a "Car Fest" for vehicle displays, and a "Dirt Fest" for off-road motocross activities.
- Sports Fest: This includes competitions in basketball, billiards, and e-sports (Mobile Legends).
