= Walang Biruan =

Single by Kaia
- Language: Filipino; English
- English title: No Joke
- Released: September 27, 2024
- Genre: Bubblegum pop; Jersey club; UK garage
- Length: 2:32
- Label: Sony
- Composers: Kaia; Luis Montales; Kenneth Amores
- Producers: Kaia; Luis Montales; Kenneth Amores

Kaia singles chronology
"You Did It" (2024)	"Walang Biruan" (2024)	"Tanga" (2025)

Music video
- "Walang Biruan" on YouTube

"Walang Biruan" (transl. No Joke) is a song recorded by the Filipino girl group Kaia. Released as a digital single on September 27, 2024, through Sony Music Philippines. It is a bubblegum pop, Jersey club, and UK garage track about sincerely confessing one's feelings to their crush. The song was written and produced by Kaia, alongside Luis Montales and Kenneth Amores of the boy band Kindred. The members of the group based the song's lyrical content on their personal experiences, drawing inspiration from their past romantic relationships. The track received acclaim from music critics. Elijah Pareño of Rolling Stone Philippines considered "Walang Biruan" to be a creative turning point for Kaia, describing the song as "unique, charming, and authentic".

Its music video was directed by Jonathan Tal Placido. In partnership with Apple Music, the clip was filmed entirely on an iPhone 16, making Kaia the first P-pop group to shoot a music video in full using a phone. The group has performed the song at several events, such as Billboard Philippines' first anniversary concert, Mainstage, as well as the Vedanta Udaipur World Music Festival, which made them the first P-pop act to perform in India. It was nominated for Choreography in a Live Performance at the 2024 P-pop Awards.

== Background and release ==
On April 12, 2024, Kaia released "You Did It", their first single since "5678" in March 2023. On August 28, the group posted an audio snippet of an upcoming, then-unreleased song with the lyrics "Walang biro, walang biruan" (transl. No joke, not joking around). The track's title, "Walang Biruan" (transl. No Joke), was revealed on September 13. In an exclusive statement to Billboard Philippines, the group's leader Angela shared that their fans had been clamoring for them to release a bubblegum pop song, and "this [was] finally it!" The group further teased the single through the Kaia x Wear Casa Premium Collection, their fashion collaboration with the clothing brand Wear Casa. Kaia's Charlotte revealed that the collection's "cutesy" clothes were a hint for the song. On September 27, Kaia released "Walang Biruan" as a single under Sony Music Philippines. The song was made available on various streaming platforms.

== Composition and lyrics ==
"Walang Biruan"
A 17-second sample of "Walang Biruan" by Kaia, where the chorus can be heard. Charice, a member of the group, has said that she found its whispery style challenging to execute, afraid that she would lose her breath during recording.

"Walang Biruan" is two minutes and 32 seconds long. It has been described as a bubblegum pop, Jersey club, and UK garage track that draws inspiration from the pop music of the early 2000s ("Y2K pop"). The song was written and produced by the Kaia members, alongside Luis Montales and Kenneth Amores, members of the boy band Kindred. The group finished writing the song in less than an hour, according to Kaia's Angela. Fellow member Sophia described the songwriting process as "spontaneous". They also recorded the demo within a day, experimenting with ideas like blending the pre-chorus and chorus together.

&Asian's Julienne Loreto observed that the song is repetitive, with "sparse" and "nondescript" instrumentals that are placed lower in the mix than the vocals. They described the sung lines as "bouncy" and the harmonies "tight", remarking that the song would be far less effective without its well-composed vocal melodies. The song features a chorus performed with light, whisper-like delivery. Kaia's Charice said that its vocal style was difficult to execute in the studio, as she worried that she would lose her breath while recording. Although the group's members felt as though they did not have enough production experience, Montales and Amores encouraged them to contribute melodies and ad libs to "Walang Biruan". According to Sophia, the group made an effort to utilize each member's individual vocal strengths.

Lyrically, the song is about sincerely confessing one's feelings to their crush. The members have stated that the song's lyrics are based on their past experiences of crushes and romantic love. In an interview with Billboard Philippines' Mayks Go, Angela emphasized that while the song shows the group's "softer" side, it is "still empowering". She said that admitting one's romantic interest in another person is a "very brave" act, with fellow member Charlotte affirming that the song depicts its narrator as someone who is "in control of [their] emotions". In an interview with The Philippine Star's Charmie Joy Pagulong, Angela further explained the song's empowering message, pointing out that anyone can make the first move in a romantic relationship regardless of their gender.

== Reception ==
The song received acclaim from music critics. Elijah Pareño of Rolling Stone Philippines named "Walang Biruan" as a creative turning point for Kaia, following the "shaky" and "outdated" sound of their earlier music. He described the track as "unique, charming, and authentic". Billboard Philippines' Mayks Go wrote that the song is "sure to leave a sweet first impression". Writing for Pulp, Aicy Marie Castulo called the song "relatable and fun to listen to", lauding its "flawless" blend of different genres. "Walang Biruan" earned a nomination for Choreography in a Live Performance at the 2024 P-pop Music Awards. In a listicle published on July 29, 2025, Julienne Loreto of &Asian hailed "Walang Biruan" as the tenth best P-pop song of the 21st century so far, praising its "irresistible" melodies and "thoughtful" topline (Note: This term refers to a song's vocal melodies, harmonies, and lyrics that "sit" on top of its instrumentals.) writing.

== Music video ==
The song's music video was directed by Jonathan Tal Placido. According to the Philippine Daily Inquirer's Hannah Mallorca, the video celebrates female friendships. Its opening scene shows the rest of the group encouraging Kaia's Alexa to talk to her crush online. She accidentally sends them a message, making the other members giggle. When the group filmed the scene, they were not given a script. The rest of the video shows how one's imagination "runs wild" as they confess their feelings to the person they admire, the act causing both anxiety and relief. Apple Music partnered with the group to shoot the entire video on an iPhone 16, marking Kaia as the first P-pop group to film a music video solely with a phone. One Music Philippines' Aicy Marie Castulo described the video's aesthetics as "Y2K" and "retro".

== Live performances ==
On October 5, 2024, Kaia performed "Walang Biruan" at the Fusion x Cebu Music Festival, held at the City Di Mare venue in Cebu City. In the same month, Kaia performed "Walang Biruan" at Billboard Philippines' Mainstage concert, in celebration of the magazine's one-year anniversary. The group debuted a new dance intro for the song at Mainstage. On November 15, they performed the track at Viber's Backstage Pass Live event at the Brooklyn Warehouse in Sampaloc, Manila. "Walang Biruan" was included in Kaia's set list at the Vedanta Udaipur World Music Festival, which marked them as the first P-pop act to perform in India; as well as Fusion Music Festival's 10-year anniversary show on March 15, 2025, held at the CCP Open Grounds in Pasay City. The group also performed the song at the Puregold OPM Con on July 5 at the Philippine Arena and at the Billboard Philippines x Cosmos event on September 19 at the Baked Studios in Makati City.

== Awards and nominations ==
Organization	Year	Category	Result	Ref.
P-pop Music Awards	2024	Choreography in a Live Performance	Nominated	

== Listicles ==
Publisher	Year	Listicle	Placement	Ref.
Billboard Philippines	2025	10 Songs You Should Listen To Before Attending Fusion: The Philippine Music Festival 2025	Placed	
&Asian	2025	The 25 Best P-pop Songs of the 21st Century: So Far	10th	

== Personnel ==
Credits are adapted from Apple Music.

- Kaia – vocals, composition, lyrics, production
- Kenneth Amores – composition, lyrics, production
- Luis Montales – composition, lyrics, production
