= Hapag =

Hapag may mean:

- Hamburg America Line, a former German shipping company: Hamburg Amerikanische Packetfahrt Actien-Gesellschaft (HAPAG)
- 724 Hapag, a minor planet (asteroid)
- "Hapag" (transl. Dining Table), a 2025 single by the Filipino boy band Alamat
