= Stars on the Floor =

Philippine television reality show

- Season 2 title card
- Genre: Reality competition
- Created by: Romer Gonzales; Johnny Manahan
- Directed by: Johnny Manahan; Paolo Valenciano; Miggy Tanchanco
- Presented by: Alden Richards
- Judges: Marian Rivera; Pokwang; Jay Joseph Roncesvalles; Rayver Cruz
- Country of origin: Philippines
- No. of seasons: 2
- No. of episodes: 32 (list of episodes)

Production
- Executive producer: Flora Mae Lagman
- Production locations: GMA Network Center, Quezon City, Philippines
- Camera setup: Multiple-camera setup
- Production company: GMA Entertainment Group

Original release
- Network: GMA Network
- Release: June 28, 2025 – present

Stars on the Floor is a Philippine dance reality competition show broadcast by GMA Network. Hosted by Alden Richards, it premiered on June 28, 2025.

== Premise ==
The show consists of 10 contestants paired-up in two. A celebrity dancer and digital dancer will form a team as dance partner on the floor. The dance duo's performance is mentored by a professional dance choreographer.

Each team will have to perform a predetermined dance challenges and compete against each other for judges votes and win the hearts of the audience. The top two teams of the week will battle out in a dance showdown to earn points and reach the top spot of the weekly leaderboard that will lead them to grand finals competition.

The dance performances range in a variety of dance genre including hip-hop, ballroom, jazz, Latin styles, contemporary, choreo, lyrical, krump, jive-tastic, locking, Burlesque, femme dance, viral dance trends and theatrical dance infused to the chosen, dance theme of the week.

== Cast ==
Cast

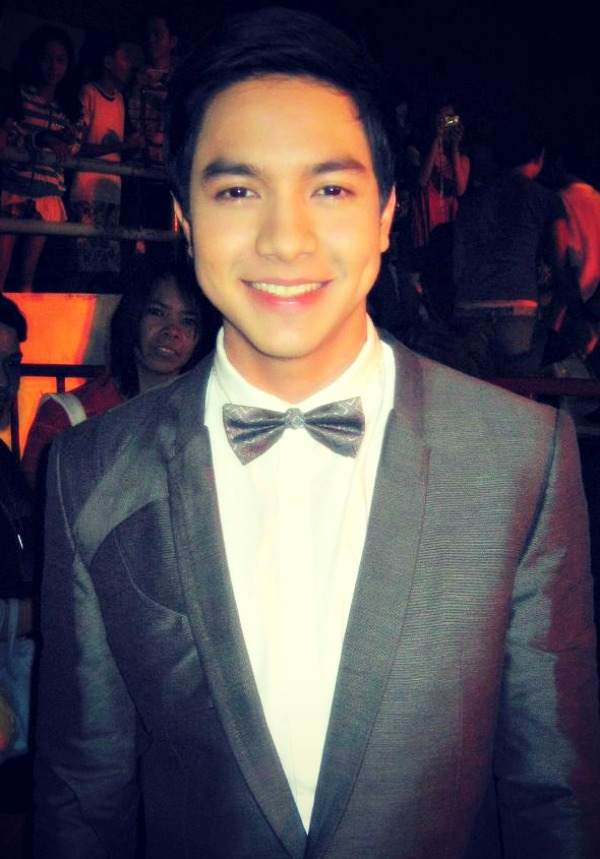
Alden Richards

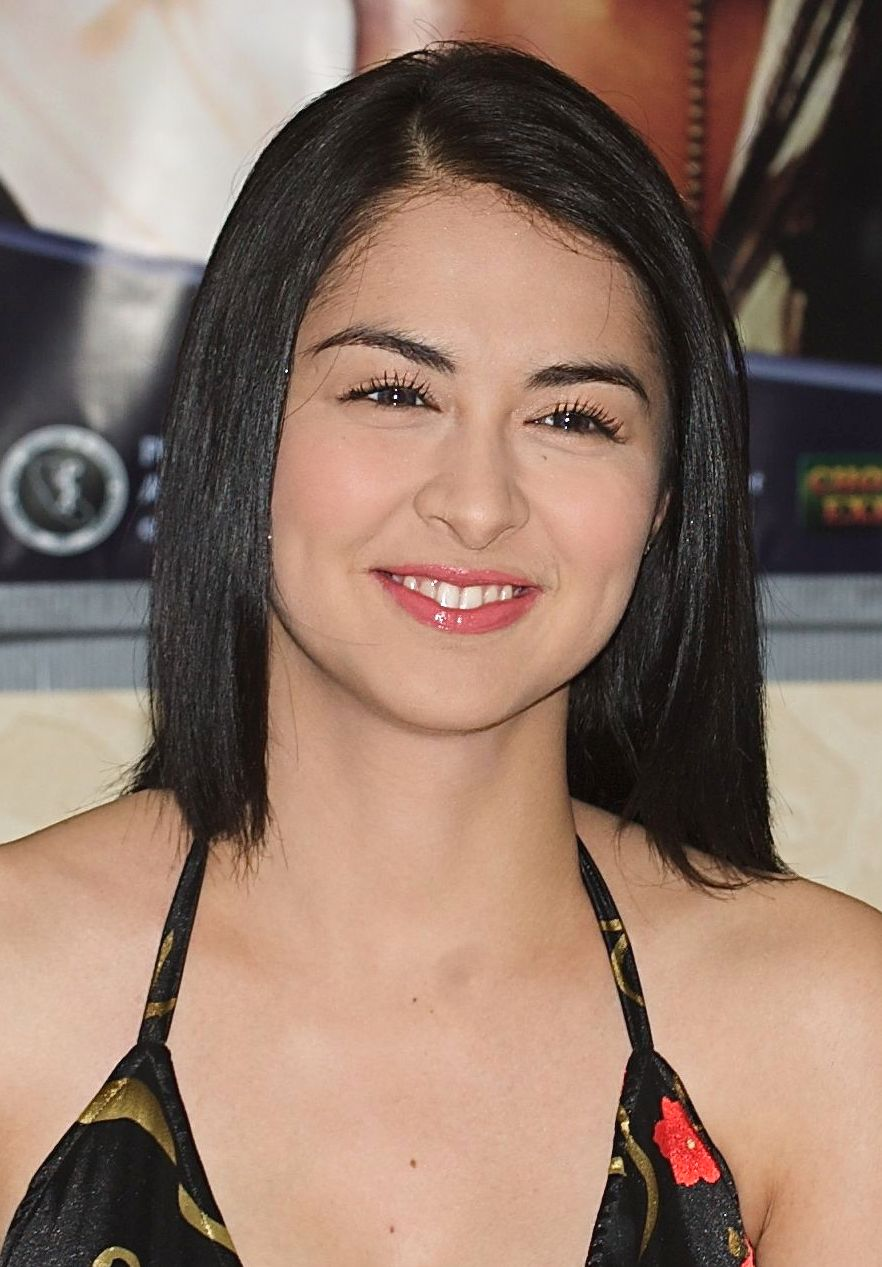
Marian Rivera

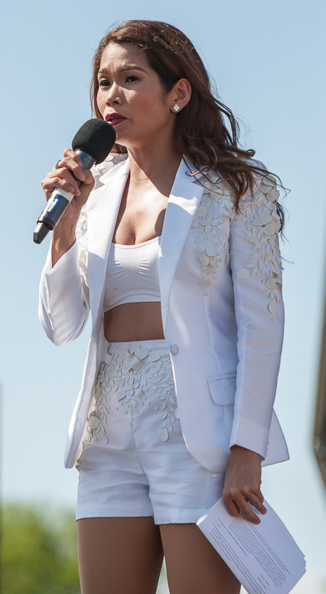
Pokwang

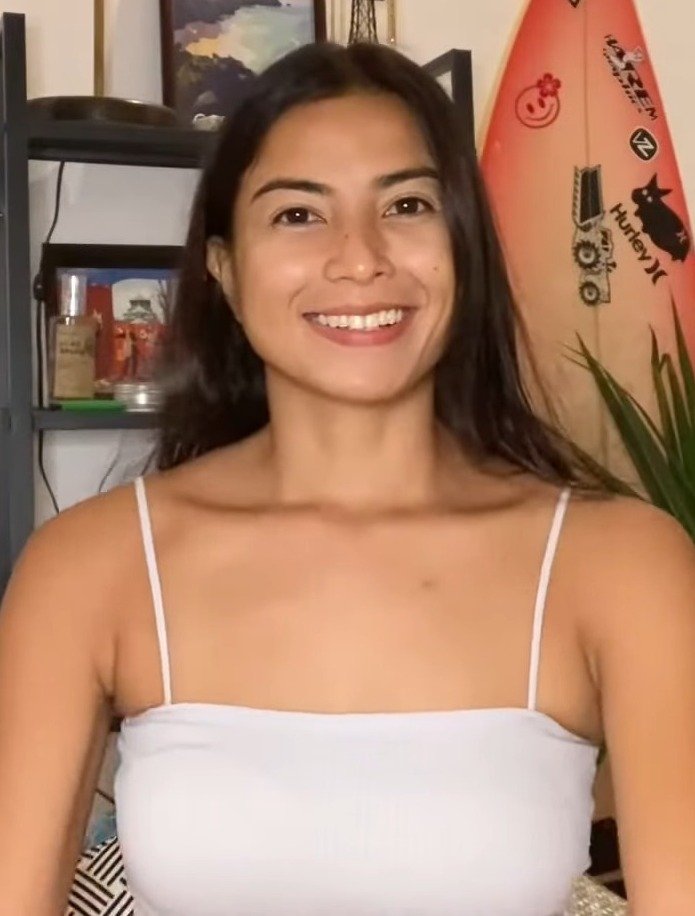
Glaiza de Castro

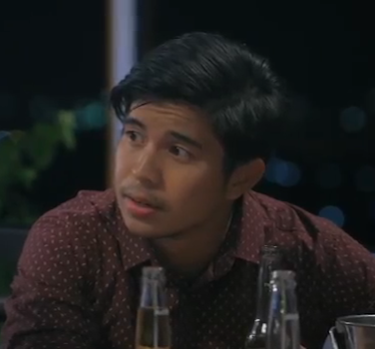
Rodjun Cruz

Alden Richards served as the main host, with Lexi Gonzales and Shan Vesagas as backstage livestream hosts.

The winners were decided by a panel of judges labeled as the "Dance Authorities", included actress Marian Rivera, comedian Pokwang and choreographer Jay Joseph Roncesvalles. The judges evaluated each team based on their dance performance, emotions, entertainment value, dance techniques, coordination, synchronicity and creativity. Rayver Cruz joined the show's second season as the new judge.

=== Contestants ===
The dance competition features 10 contestants paired as the dance duo in a weekly, dance competition which was announced on May 30, 2025. The grand champion was to receive a cash prizes of 1.5 million Philippine pesos, with a portion of 500,000 pesos, to be donated to their chosen charity institution.

=== Season 1 ===
Celebrity	Occupation(s)	Grand final episode
Glaiza de Castro	Actress-dancer	Runner-up
Thea Astley	Singer-dancer	Finalist
Faith da Silva	Actress-dancer	Finalist
Rodjun Cruz	Actor-dancer	Won
Patrick Rocamora	VXON Boyband member, singer-dancer	Finalist
Dasuri Choi	TV personality-dancer	Won
Zeus Collins	Actor-dancer	Finalist
Joshua Decena	Internet personality-dancer	Finalist
JM Yvrrevere	Lead choreographer of dance crew A-team	Runner-up
Kakai Almeda	Internet personality-dancer	Finalist

=== Season 2 ===
Celebrity	Occupation(s)	Grand final episode
Chanty Videla	Lapillus member, singer-actress	Runner-up
Jasmine Curtis-Smith	Actress-dancer	Finalist
Paul Salas	Actor-dancer	Finalist
Rocco Nacino	Actor	Finalist
Sugar Mercado	Actress-dancer	Won
Denise	Calista member, singer-dancer	Finalist
Jao Canlas	ALAMAT member, dancer	Runner-up
Jeromy	Hori7on member, dancer	Won
Joker	1st.One member, singer	Finalist
Sophia	KAIA member, singer-dancer	Finalist

=== Coach choreographers ===
- MJ Arda - head choreographer
- El-John Macalatan
- Angel Danatagan
- Dune Mondejar
- Cheng Bona
- LA Balagtas
- April Tamon
- Macky Quiobe
- Lowell Louie Tan
- Aaron Jazz Gamit

== Seasons ==
Stars on the Floor seasons
Season	First released	Last released
1	June 28, 2025	October 18, 2025
2	February 15, 2026	May 31, 2026

== Production ==
Principal photography commenced on April 23, 2025. The series released online content, such as behind the scenes footage and rehearsals. The pilot episode aired on June 28, 2025, and concluded its last episode on October 18, 2025. The set was laid out in a 360 degree arena, styled studio with a wide space for dancing and the studio audiences were seated on all sides. The central stage was walled by giants LED lights. A rectangular table with three chairs were facing across the main stage, which were reserved for the judges. The show was primarily filmed in GMA Network Studio Annex.

== Ratings ==
According to AGB Nielsen Philippines' National Urban Television Audience Measurement People in television homes, the pilot episode of Stars on the Floor earned 9.5% rating. The season one's finale episode scored a 8.7% rating. The second season premiere achieved a 7.8% rating.

== Accolades ==
Awards received by Stars on the Floor
Year	Award	Category	Recipient	Result	Ref.
2025	Asian Academy Creative Awards	Best Music and Dance Programme Award	Stars on the Floor	Won	
