= Josh Cullen (musician) =

Filipino singer-songwriter (born 1993)

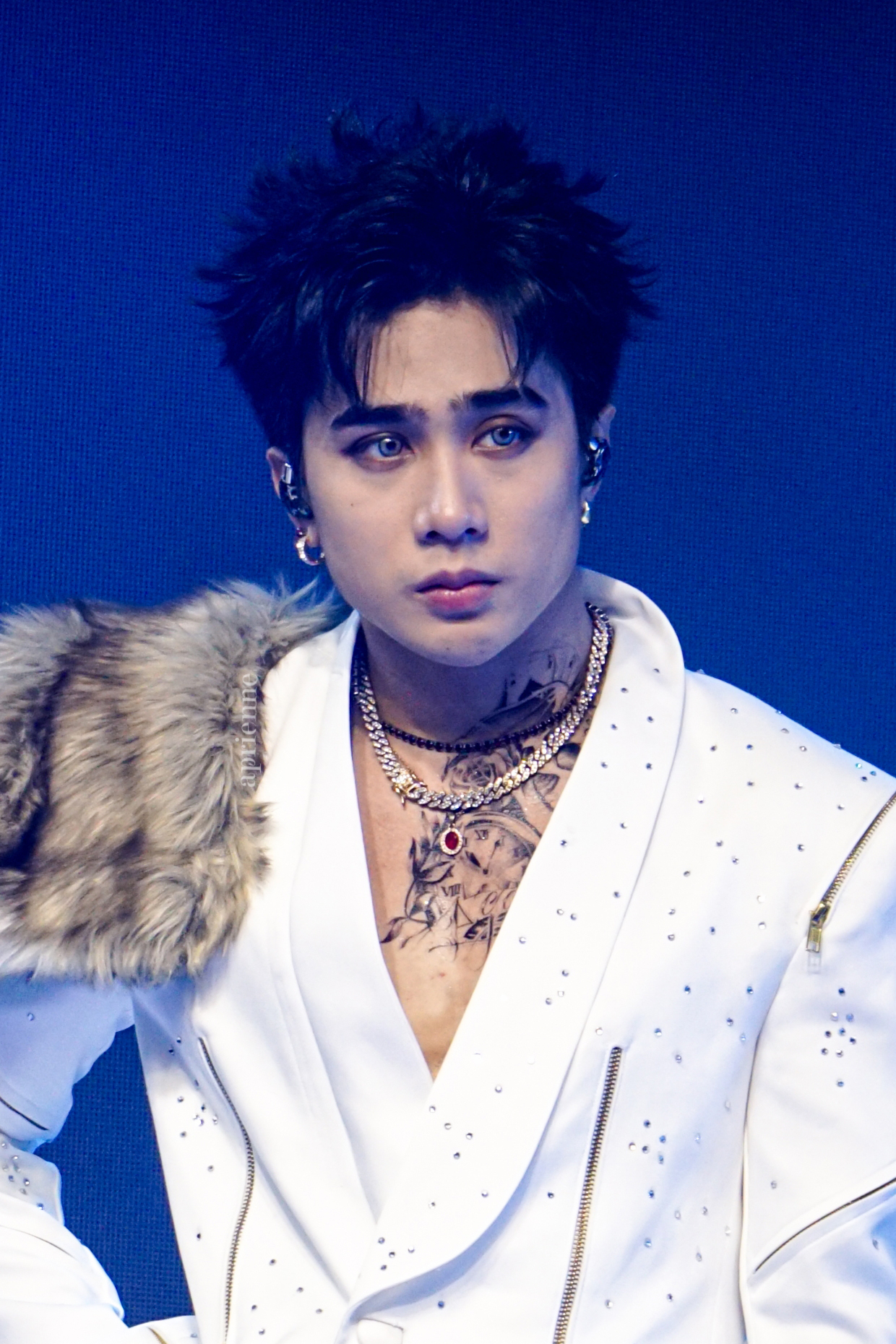
- Josh in 2023
- Born: Josh Cullen Santos; October 22, 1993 (age 33); Las Piñas, Metro Manila, Philippines
- Occupations: Singer; songwriter; rapper; producer; dancer; choreographer; Creative Director; professional gamer
- Years active: 2018–present
- Musical career
- Genres: P-pop; hip hop; pop
- Instruments: Vocals
- Labels: 1Z; Sony Philippines; ShowBT
- Member of: SB19

Josh Cullen Santos (born October 22, 1993) is a Filipino singer-rapper, dancer, producer and songwriter. He is the lead rapper, lead dancer and sub-vocalist of the Filipino boy band SB19 managed under 1Z Entertainment.

== Early life ==
Josh was born on October 22, 1993, in Las Piñas, Metro Manila, Philippines. He has one older sister. He revealed on a YouTube vlog that a single mother raised him and he never met his biological father. In the same vlog, Josh revealed that he was a victim of domestic violence by their nanny while their mother was at work. Josh and his family struggled financially leading to his intermittent schooling, and graduated high school at a later age. After graduating, Josh worked as a computer technician and a call center agent prior to auditioning as a talent.

== Career ==
=== 2016–2018: Pre-debut ===
In 2016, South Korean entertainment company ShowBT branched out in the Philippines and opened a talent audition for Filipinos aspiring to become professional performers. Josh, among the participants, was chosen later on for a 5-member boy band. Josh started training which is a common practice for K-Pop bands prior to debut. Voice and dance classes, body conditioning, personality development, and the like were trained. On several accounts, the SB19 members recalled how rigorous the sessions were wherein hours of nonstop and unpaid training daily while juggling with their work. But more than the training, it was the threat of failing their weekly evaluation and the possibility of being eliminated. According to Josh in an interview, “the weekly evaluations were really nerve-wracking. That’s the performance that you’ll have to prepare for. Other trainees and teachers will watch you[...] You’ll really get nervous. And if you don’t perform well, you’ll be eliminated right away."

During his training, he drew inspirations from Filipino hip hop artists Loonie, Gloc-9, Shanti Dope, and Smugglaz. He also admired the styles of Bigbang's G-Dragon, and BTS.

=== 2018–2022: Debut as SB19 and breakthrough ===
On October 26, 2018, Josh debuted with fellow members Pablo, Stell, Justin, and Ken as P-Pop group known as SB19. Their debut single "Tilaluha" was written by fellow member Pablo, but its success was not widely acclaimed. With a message centered on heartbreak and unrequited love, the song was intended to introduce the band and their powerful vocals in which it debuted poorly to charts. The initial poor reception for the group and their singles almost led to the band's disbandment. SB19's second single "Go Up" was released on July 19, 2019. They described the song as their "last shot" because they had decided to disband if their career would not progress after. The group had gained public attention after the dance practice video of the song went viral due to a tweet of a fan account. Opportunities opened and the group started to appear in multiple radio and television outlets, both local and internationally. In 2021, SB19 became the first Filipino and Southeast Asian act to be nominated in Billboard Music Awards for Top Social Artist along with BTS, Blackpink, Ariana Grande, and Seventeen—which BTS won. It marked the first-ever appearance of a Filipino artist in the Billboard Music Awards.

In 2022, Josh joined his independent musician cousins Ocho the Bullet and Carrot Mayor on their track "Sofa (Remix)", released on YouTube and Apple Music.

=== 2023–present: Wild Tonight, debut as solo artist, Lost & Found debut album ===
On February 24, 2023, Josh made his debut as a solo artist, releasing a single called "Wild Tonight". He co-produced the material with Ace Santos, his cousin.

On September 6, 2024, Josh released his debut album, Lost & Found. His album includes nine tracks, including his singles "Sumaya", "Silent Cries", "Honest", and "1999". On the same month, he held his first solo concert in celebration of his debut album at New Frontier Theater in Quezon City.

On November 13, Josh collaborated with K-pop group H1-KEY to release their single, titled "Re: Thinkin' About You". The following week, the single was released on November 20.

On December, Josh announced that he is set to release his music video for his song, "1999" from his debut album Lost & Found. The following week, he released his music video, accompanied by his standalone single.

== Discography ==
=== As lead artist ===
List of studio albums
Title	Details	Ref.
Lost & Found	Released: September 6, 2024; Label: Sony Music Philippines; Formats: digital download, streaming	

List of singles showing year released and album name
Title	Year	Album
"Wild Tonight"	2023	Non-album singles
"Pakiusap Lang"	2023	Non-album singles
"Get Right"	2023	Non-album singles
"Yoko Na" (with Al James)	2024	Non-album singles
"1999"	2024	Lost & Found
"See Me"	2024	Lost & Found
"Silent Cries"	2024	Lost & Found
"Honest"	2024	Lost & Found
"No Control" (feat. (e)motion engine)	2024	Lost & Found
"Lights Out" (feat. Mo Mitchell)	2024	Lost & Found
"Sumaya"	2024	Lost & Found
"Re: Thinkin' About You" (with H1-KEY)	2024	Non-album single

=== Production credits ===
Year	Artist(s)	Song	Album	Lyricist		Composer		Ref.
Year	Artist(s)	Song	Album	Credited	With	Credited	With	Ref.
2022	Ocho the Bullet	"Sofa" Remix	Non-album single	Yes	Carrot Mayor	No	—	
2023	Josh Cullen	"Wild Tonight"	Non-album single	Yes	—	Yes	Albert Christian “Ace” Santos	
2023	SB19	"Crimzone"	Pagtatag!	Yes	—	Yes	Pablo; Josue; FELIP	
2025	SB19	"8TonBall"	Simula at Wakas	Yes	Benji Bae	No	—	

== Videography ==
=== Music video ===
Year	Title	Director(s)	Length	Ref.
2024	"Thinking About You" with H1-KEY	Unknown	3:20	

== Awards and nominations ==
Award ceremony	Year	Category	Nominee(s)/work(s)	Result	Ref.
Awit Awards	2023	People's Voice Favorite Male Artist	Josh Cullen	Nominated	
Nylon Manila BBB Awards	2022	Favorite Viral Game Streamer	Josh Cullen Santos	Won	
PPOP Awards	2023	Top New Artist of the Year	Josh Cullen	Won	
Tier One Entertainment	2021	IRL People Choice Award	Josh Cullen Santos	Won	
Wish Music Awards	2024	Breakthrough Artist of the Year	Josh Cullen	Won	
Wish Music Awards	2024	Wish Hip Hop Song Of the Year	"Wild Tonight"	Nominated	
Wish Music Awards	2024	Wishclusive Collaboration of the Year	Josh Cullen (with Ocho the Bullet and Angela Hermosa) - "Sofa"	Nominated	
Wish Music Awards	2024	Wishers' Choice	Josh Cullen	Won	
Wish Music Awards	2024	Spotify Philippines: Mr. Up Down Up Down Award	Josh Cullen	Won	
Wish Music Awards	2025	Wish Hip Hop Song of the Year	"Get Right"	Won	
