= 100 Awit para kay Stella =

100 Awit Para kay Stella
- Theatrical release poster
- Directed by: Jason Paul Laxamana
- Written by: Jason Paul Laxamana
- Produced by: Vincent Del Rosario III; Veronique Del Rosario-Corpus
- Starring: Bela Padilla; JC Santos; Kyle Echarri
- Cinematography: Noel Teehankee
- Edited by: Noah Tonga
- Music by: Paulo Protacio
- Production companies: Ninuno Media; Viva Films
- Distributed by: Viva Films
- Release date: September 10, 2025
- Running time: 129 minutes
- Country: Philippines
- Language: Filipino
- Box office: ₱65 million

100 Awit Para Kay Stella (lit. '100 Songs for Stella') is a 2025 Philippine musical romantic drama film written and directed by Jason Paul Laxamana. It is the sequel of the 2017 film 100 Tula para kay Stella. It stars Bela Padilla, JC Santos and Kyle Echarri.

== Plot ==
Fidel Lansangan resigns from his job after being denied time to mourn his father’s death. With nowhere to stay, he briefly considers moving in with his mother, Sandra, but leaves upon overhearing his stepbrother complain about sharing a room with him. Meanwhile, Stella Puno, now CEO of Rainstar—an events company catering to singles—meets aspiring singer Clyde Pelayo outside one of her events. Clyde, unsure which track to release as his debut single, asks Stella to choose. The song she picks becomes a hit and propels him to fame.

As Rainstar prepares another event featuring Clyde, Stella’s team books a larger venue to accommodate the anticipated crowd. They secure Bale Ganaka, a property owned by Fidel. During the event, Clyde openly courts Stella and performs his new single, prompting her to suspect that Fidel might secretly be the songwriter behind Clyde’s work. Fidel, hearing the performance, tries to slip away but accidentally runs into Stella and Clyde. It’s revealed that Fidel and Clyde are close friends, and that Fidel and Stella once knew each other in college.

The next day, Stella returns to Bale Ganaka to discuss another booking and ends up inviting Fidel to eat with her. She directly asks if he writes Clyde’s songs, but he denies it. At the following Rainstar event, Clyde performs another track with lyrics that clearly evoke Stella, leaving her emotional. She rushes to find Fidel and confronts him again. When he continues to deny involvement, she searches his notebook, discovers proof, and urges him to sing for her. Fidel finally opens up, admitting he still has feelings for her, and the two rekindle their relationship.

Clyde later asks Fidel to write four additional songs for his album and offers him a vacation to focus. Fidel brings Stella along, and they travel to Tanay, Rizal, reminiscing about their shared past. While working on a new piece, Fidel snaps when Stella remarks that the song suits Clyde’s album, insisting he wrote it for himself and wants to prioritize his own voice. Hurt, Stella admits she fears repeating the trauma of her past marriage to Von, whose abuse led to the death of their baby, Ulan.

Their photos from the trip go viral, resulting in public backlash that forces Rainstar to shut down. Clyde confronts Stella, and she accuses him of exploiting Fidel. Clyde then confronts Fidel, who plays the unfinished song and urges Clyde to start writing his own material. Clyde accuses him of breaking their contract. In the aftermath, Fidel joins the Philippine Stuttering Association, embracing his speech condition and gaining new confidence.

Soon after, Clyde seeks out Stella to apologize and asks her to organize one last event for his upcoming album launch. At the event, he dedicates his final performance to his father and to Fidel, calling him onstage to sing with him. Stella, moved, runs outside in tears as Fidel follows. He thanks her for helping him experience love and growth, saying he no longer needs anything more in life. When Stella asks, “Even me?” he quietly answers, “Yes,” and she hugs him tightly.

In the final scene, Stella confronts her ex-husband Von in a bar, firmly declaring that she is no longer his wife. She leaves with a sense of liberation and steps into the rain, smiling and finally free.

== Cast ==
- Bela Padilla as Stella Puno
- JC Santos as Fidel Lansangan
- Kyle Echarri as Clyde Pelayo
- Nanette Inventor as Fidel's aunt
- Yayo Aguila as Sandra, Fidel's mother
- Albie Casiño as Von, Stella's Ex-husband
- Jamilla Obispo
- Marion Aunor as Fidel's Manager
- Nicco Manalo as Stella's Co-worker
- Carl Guevara
- Andrea Babierra
- Bob Jbeili as Errol Palacio
- PJ Rosario as Grant, Fidel's half-brother
- Mo Mitchell as Doy, Fidel's Cousin
- Tranx Risch
- Shaila Felix

== Production ==
In January 2020, director Jason Paul Laxamana confirmed and announced that 100 Tula Para Kay Stella would have a sequel. On October 7, 2024, plans for the sequel were affirmed, with the upcoming film being titled 100 Awit Para Kay Stella, with Padilla and Santos reprising their roles.

== Soundtrack ==
The film soundtracks are mostly composed by Thyro Alfaro.

100 Awit Para kay Stella Original Movie Soundtrack
No.	Title	Writer(s)	Artist	Length
1.	"Simoy"	Thyro Alfaro	Rob Deniel	3:19
2.	"Iisang Daan"		Rob Deniel; Kyle Echarri	3:41
3.	"Nakupo"		Kyle Echarri	3:35
4.	"Kumusta Na"		Rob Deniel	3:21
5.	"Lipstick Na Itim"		Kyle Echarri	3:02
6.	"Balisong"	Rico Blanco	Amiel Sol; Shanne Dandan	3:39
Total length:				19:57

== Release ==
The film was released on September 10, 2025, under Viva Films.

== Reception ==
=== Box office ===
The film was screened back to back with its predecessor 100 Tula Para Kay Stella on September 5, 2025, with the film being a sellout.

The film was released nationwide on September 10 alongside Magellan and earned ₱30 million on its first week despite experiencing big competition like The Conjuring: Last Rites, Demon Slayer: Kimetsu no Yaiba – The Movie: Infinity Castle and JUJUTSU KAISEN: Hidden Inventory / Premature Death and grossing ₱50 million on the second week.

=== Critical response ===
Philip Cu Unjieng of Manila Bulletin gave the film a positive feedback and wrote; 100 Awit Para Kay Stella is a film with no neat resolution, reminding us that, as so often in real life, there are no neat endings. But it leaves us with hope, and the chance for renewal. Let’s see if it’ll become a trilogy.

Fred Hawson of News.ABS-CBN.com also gave the film a positive review and he said that; JC Santos and Bela Padilla fit very comfortably back into their characters, quirks and all. The fans in the audience react gleefully to their undeniable chemistry together.
