= Lost & Found (Josh Cullen album) =

Studio album by Josh Cullen
- Released: September 6, 2024
- Genre: Pop rock
- Length: 30:51
- Language: Tagalog; English
- Label: Sony Philippines
- Producer: Xerxes Bakker; Benjamin Samana; Josh Cullen; Antoine Abel Aboulkassimi; Wonjun; Chael Adriano; Japs Mendoza; Matthew Auditor; Albert Christian Santos; Justin Grei Torres; SAB; C-Tru; Kael Guerrero; Ralph Dela Cruz

Singles from Lost & Found
- 1. "Sumaya" Released: June 2, 2024; 2. "Silent Cries" Released: August 30, 2024; 3. "Honest" Released: September 2, 2024; 4. "1999" Released: December 13, 2024

Lost & Found is the debut album by Filipino singer and SB19 member Josh Cullen. It was released on September 6, 2024, through Sony Music Philippines. It contains nine original tracks, with two instrumentals and four pre-released singles.

== Background and release ==
Josh debuted as a solo artist in 2023, and has released various tracks, including "Wild Tonight". He announced the release of his new album titled Lost & Found on August 27, 2024, with a schedule for the release of teasers, concept photos, track list, and singles. It was released on September 6, 2024.

To promote his album "Lost & Found", Josh held his first solo concert with the same name at New Frontier Theater in Quezon City. The tour continued, with stops at Dubai (November 2), Cebu City (November 9), and Hong Kong (November 10).

== Composition and lyrics ==
The album explores themes of openness, pain, and vulnerability, transforming his personal traumas into a universal experience that heals both the artist and his listeners. Josh uses the album as a cathartic medium to take charge of his life, conveying hope and resilience throughout the narrative.

"Lost & Found" tells Josh's life story, aiming to connect with others and provide support for those experiencing similar challenges. It also showcases his diverse musical talents, spanning from pop rock to heavy-hitting pop-punk, with support from (e)motion engine and Alamat member Mo Mitchell on selected tracks.

== Track listing ==
Lost & Found track listing
No.	Title	Writer(s)	Producer(s)	Length
1.	"1999"	Sam Atkins, Josh Cullen Santos, Xerxes Bakker	Xerxes Bakker	3:33
2.	"See Me"	Xerxes Bakker, Benjamin Samana, Stewart Taylor, Josh Cullen Santos, Erik Frank, Ionut Madalin Rosioru	Xerxes Bakker, Benjamin Samana	2:46
3.	"Silent Cries"	Josh Cullen Santos	Josh Cullen Santos, Antoine Abel Aboulkassimi, Won Jun	3:13
4.	"Honest"	Josh Cullen Santos, MB	Josh Cullen Santos, Chael Adriano, Japs Mendoza, Matthew Auditor	3:34
5.	"No Control (ft. (e)motion engine)"	Josh Cullen Santos, Albert Christian Santos, Justin Grei Torres	Albert Christian Santos, Justin Grei Torres	4:09
6.	"Lights Out (feat. Mo Mitchell)"	Mo Mitchell, Josh Cullen Santos, SAB, C-Tru	SAB, C-Tru	3:03
7.	"Sumaya"	Josh Cullen Santos, Kael Guerrero	Josh Cullen Santos, Kael Guerrero, Ralph Dela Cruz	3:12
8.	"Silent Cries (Instrumental)"	Josh Cullen Santos	Josh Cullen Santos, Antoine Abel Aboulkassimi, Won Jun	3:13
9.	"No Control (Instrumental)"	Josh Cullen Santos, Albert Christian Santos, Justin Grei Torres	Albert Christian Santos, Justin Grei Torres	4:09
Total length:				30:51
