= Tanga (song) =

Single by Kaia
- Language: Tagalog
- English title: Idiot
- Released: March 28, 2025
- Genre: Pop; R&B
- Length: 2:27
- Label: Sony
- Songwriter: Zack Tabudlo
- Producer: Zack Tabudlo

Kaia singles chronology
"Walang Biruan" (2024)	"Tanga" (2025)	"Walkie Talkie" (2025)

"Tanga" (transl. Idiot; stylized in all caps) is a song by the Filipino girl group Kaia. Sony Music Philippines released in music streaming platforms on March 28, 2025. It is a pop and R&B song about youthful love, blending upbeat production with reflective lyrics about ignoring warning signs in a relationship. It was written and produced by the Filipino singer-songwriter Zack Tabudlo. The members of the girl group explained that listening to the song offered a sense of comfort, stating that it conveys the idea that experiencing a period of feeling "tanga" in love is acceptable.

== Background and release ==
On September 27, 2024, Kaia released the single "Walang Biruan" (lit. 'No Joke'). It is a bubblegum pop, Jersey club, and UK garage song about confessing one's feelings to their crush. On March 23, 2025, the group announced through Billboard Philippines the release of their single "Tanga" (lit. 'Idiot') on March 28, 2025, through digital music platforms.

== Composition and lyrics ==
"Tanga" is two minutes and twenty-six seconds long. Written and produced by Zack Tabudlo, who had previously released the 2021 single "Binibini" (lit. 'Young Woman'). The song was described as a pop and 90s R&B track about a love that borders on naiveté, combining a playful sound with introspective lyrics that depict overlooking red flags in a relationship. They added that hearing the song made them feel less alone, adding that it serves as a reminder that it is acceptable to go through a phase of feeling "tanga" in love, as long as one eventually regains self-worth. In a statement to Billboard Philippines, they expressed their enthusiasm about the collaborating with Tabudlo, stating that he had written specifically for the group. During the recording process, the members explained that they were challenged to step outside their comfort zones and discovered new vocal abilities with Tabudlo's guidance. In an interview with Nylon Manila, the group told that some individuals may struggle to move on from past relationships. They suggested that fear of meeting new people or starting over can lead to tolerating red flags under the guise of love. As referenced in their song the lyric "Sabi nga ni Mama, 'Wag kang tanga-tanga" (transl. Mother said don't be stupid) serves as a reminder to remember parental advice.

== Reception ==
Lex Celera of The Flying Lugaw described the song as "radio-friendly", pointing out its "earworm-worthy" chorus and upbeat rhythms. Celera observed that "Tanga" raises question of why people persist in unrequited love or continue relationships despite red flags.

== Awards and nominations ==
Organization	Year	Category	Result	Ref.
Filipino Music Awards	2025	Pop Song of the Year	Nominated	
P-pop Music Awards	2025	Music Video of the Year	Nominated	

== Listicles ==
Name of publisher, year listed, name of listicle, and placement
Publisher	Year	Listicle	Placement	Ref.
Billboard Philippines	2025	25 Best Filipino Songs of 2025	Placed	
GMA Integrated News	2025	10 P-pop Songs to Sing your Heart out to this Buwan ng Wika (Note: transl. National Language Month)	Placed	
The Flying Lugaw	2025	The Best Filipino Songs of 2025	Placed	
Pulp	2025	Pulp Loves: Our Favorite P-pop Songs of 2025	Placed	
