= Hapag (song) =

Single by Alamat

from the album Destino
- Language: Tagalog
- Released: November 26, 2025
- Studio: Studio Z
- Genre: R&B
- Length: 2:57
- Label: Viva
- Songwriter: Alamat
- Producer: Alas Alvarez

Alamat singles chronology
"LuzViMinda" (2025)	"Hapag" (2025)

Music video
- "Hapag" on YouTube

"Hapag" (transl. Dining Table) is a song recorded by the Filipino boy band Alamat. It is an R&B song, with lyrics from the perspective of a narrator inviting the woman he loves to dinner and vowing to protect her from harm. It was first released as a track on the group's second album Destino and re-released as a single on November 26, 2025, along with a music video.

== Background and release ==
On November 7, 2025, the Filipino boy band Alamat released their comeback single "LuzViMinda". On November 12, they released a music video for the song. Its opening scene hinted at the then-unreleased "Hapag" (transl. Table), showing neon red-tinted clips from the latter song's music video. The group's second album, Destino (transl. Destination), was released on November 21. On the weekend of November 22, the group released teasers for the song's music video. It was released on November 26.

== Composition and lyrics ==
Hapag is two minutes and 57 seconds long. It is a love song from the perspective of a narrator who wants to invite the woman he loves to dinner and protect her from harm. It has been described as an R&B song. Alamat's Alas Alvarez produced the song, featuring instrumentation by fellow members Ralph Joseph Lim (on guitar) and Tomas Rodriguez (on flute). The members of the group have described the song's lyrics as "seductive yet respectful".
