= Fort Bonifacio Tenement =

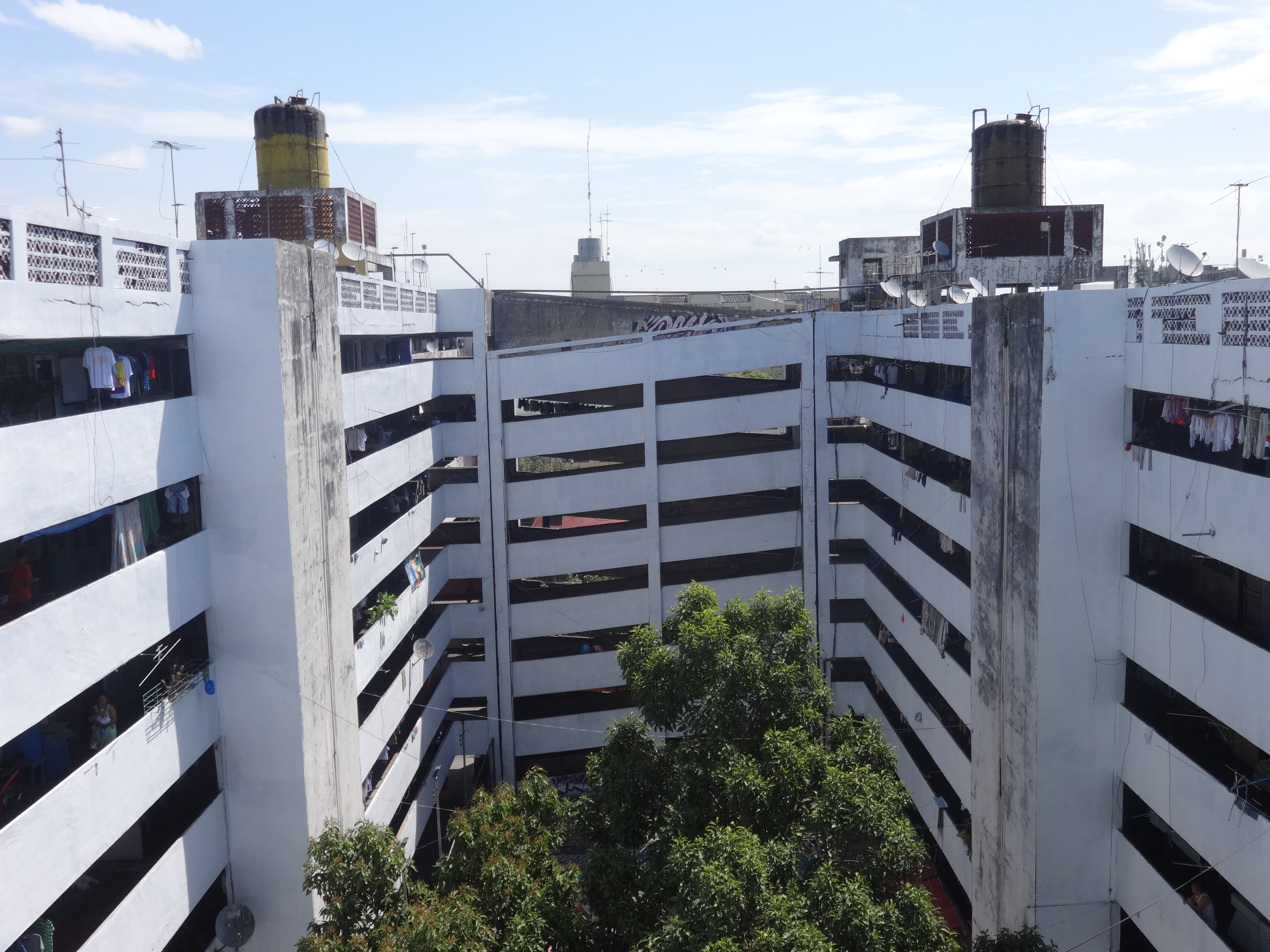
- The central courtyard
- Interactive map of the Fort Bonifacio Tenement area
- Alternative names: Western Bicutan Tenement; The Tenement; Diosdado Macapagal Tenement Housing

General information
- Status: Completed
- Type: Residential
- Location: Western Bicutan, Taguig, Philippines
- Coordinates: 14°30′31″N 121°02′14″E
- Completed: 1963

The Fort Bonifacio Tenement (FB Tenement), also known as the Diosdado Macapagal Tenement Housing, Western Bicutan Tenement or simply as The Tenement is a residential building in Western Bicutan in Taguig, Metro Manila, Philippines. It is known for its central basketball court known as Tenement Court which often serves as a medium for murals and exhibitions. In 2010, the building was declared unsafe after a structural assessment, leading to residents facing the possibility of eviction.

== History ==
The Tenement in Taguig was a public housing project by the administration of Philippine President Diosdado Macapagal. The building was constructed in 1963 as a response to the influx of migrants moving to the area which would later be known as Metro Manila.

=== Eviction ===
There have been several attempts by the government to have the tenants evicted from the Fort Bonifacio tenement. The National Housing Authority (Philippines) in 2010 declared the building along with the Punta Santa Ana Tenement and Vitas Tenement in Manila as unsafe and likely to collapse in an event of a major earthquake. During the 2010 elections, then Taguig mayoral candidate Lani Cayetano promised to residents of the Fort Bonifacio Tenement that evictions would stop and Cayetano got elected as Mayor of Taguig.

In 2014, the government issued an eviction order but residents opposed the directive to relocate to Cavite since most residents are employed within Metro Manila and residents cited a study from the Department of Public Works and Highways that their building only needs retrofitting.

From 2010 to 2018, the government has sent 19 eviction notices to residents, while residents sent 39 letters to the Taguig local government requesting temporary shelter while waiting for a replacement residential building to be built. By March 2018 only 712 families from the Fort Bonifacio and Punta Santa Ana tenements have volunteered to get transferred to another site. As of July 2022, majority of the residents remained.

== Tenants ==
The Tenement has about 700 studio units, with a typical studio being 36 square meters (390 sq ft) big. The building's first tenants in 1967 which occupied the building are minimum wage earners and previously resided in other parts of the area which would later comprise Metro Manila. The monthly rental fee for each tenant was ₱14 during the early years of the building's occupancy and has gradually grown to ₱200 by the 2000s. The government cancelled all leases in 2010, and since then has made numerous attempts to evict the building's residents. In October 2014, around 1,000 families live in the Tenement.

== Basketball and art culture ==
Kobe & Gianna (2020), a mural on The Tenement's basketball court.

The Fort Bonifacio Tenement is noted for its basketball court in its central courtyard which also served as a recreation and social venue for the building's residents. The feature was set up a few years after the building's first residents moved in the 1960s.

Filipino rapper Mike Swift, who grew up in Brooklyn became involved in The Tenement's affairs in the early 2010s. Swift, who is also known as Mr. Pinoy Hoops started an anonymous Instagram with the intention of featuring basketball courts across the Philippines which he found unique after a failed attempt to organize an All-Filipino hip hop event at the Smart Araneta Coliseum which left him in debt. The account which also included photographs of The Tenement's basketball gained traction. Swift became more involved with The Tenement after an eviction attempt of the government in 2014. He organized the first Picnic Games in 2014 to help residents of the tenement to cope up with the uncertainty regarding their possible eviction. The Picnic Games is a music and entertainment event which had its profits used for maintenance expenses for the central court and The Tenement building itself. A second and third iteration of the event was held in February and April 2015.

The basketball court has been visited by NBA players - Paul George in 2015 and LeBron James in 2016 as part of the Nike Rise Tour campaign, and by Jordan Clarkson also in 2016. The court has been also noted for being the medium of numerous temporary murals including:

- The Nike swoosh on a pumpkin orange background (2015): Meant to gain the attention of Nike which lead to the company utilizing the site as a venue for their "Rise" campaign in July 2015.
- Dunking LeBron James (2015)
- Kobe and Gianna Bryant (2020): Featuring the NBA player and her daughter after a helicopter crash in 2020 that caused their deaths.
- Filipino medalists at the 2020 Summer Olympics (2021): Depicting weightlifter Hidilyn Diaz, and Boxers Nesthy Petecio, Carlo Paalam, and Eumir Marcial.

The Tenement and its central basketball court has been featured in popular culture such as being one of the playing venues in the video game NBA Live 19 and being the "inspiration" for the Nike shoe line Nike Hyperdunk 2017. Residents began painting murals on their basketball court as part of their effort to resist eviction. The latest reportedly painted mural at the Tenement was inaugurated on 3 August 2024 by NBA players Julius Randle and Terance Mann.
