= Mo Mitchell (singer) =

Filipino musician and actor (born 2002)

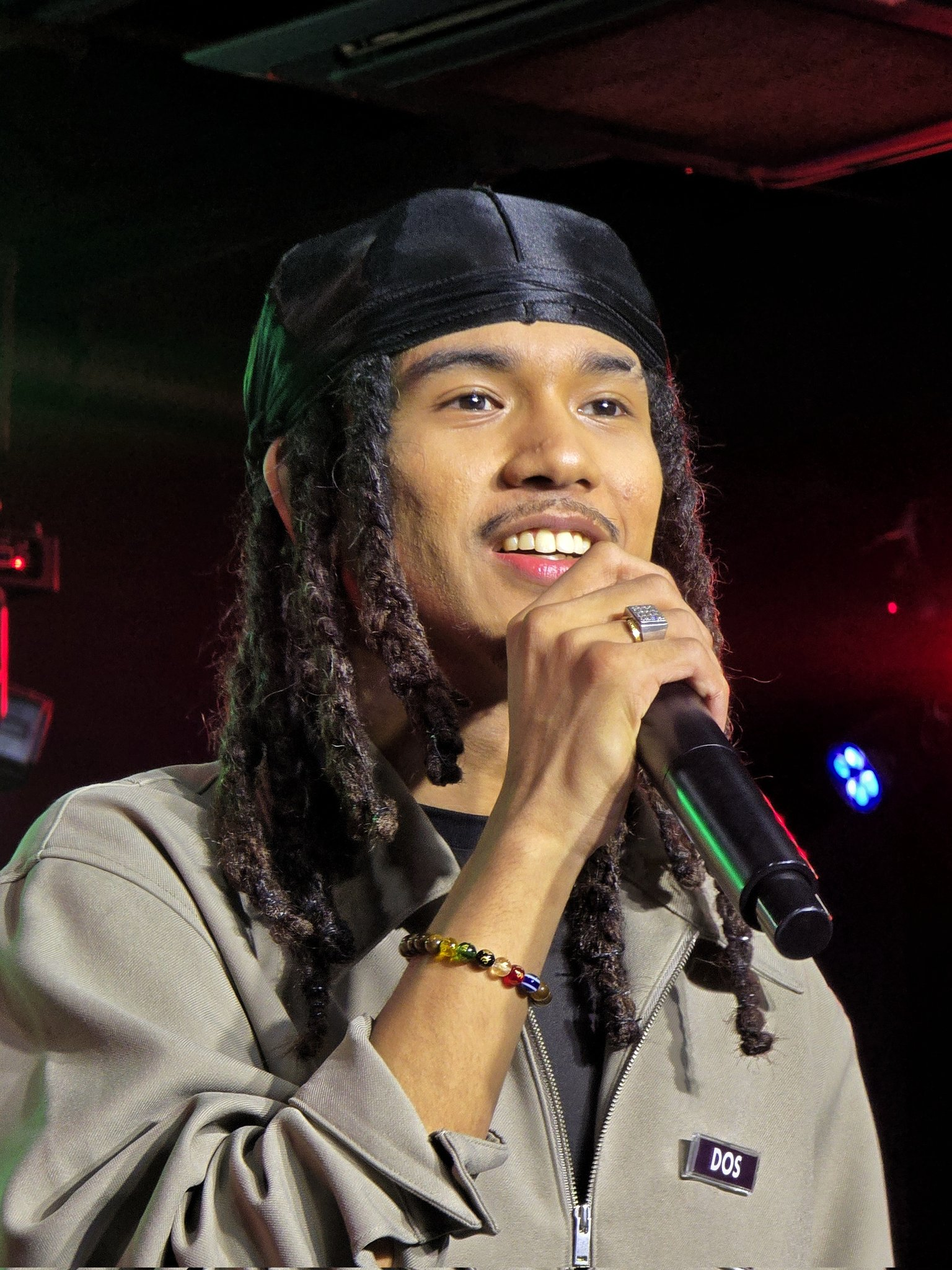
- Mitchell in July 2025
- Born: Aaron Joshua Baldos Mitchell; January 30, 2002 (age 24); Castillejos, Zambales, Philippines
- Occupations: Singer; Songwriter; Rapper; Dancer; actor
- Years active: 2020–present
- Musical career
- Genres: R&B
- Label: Viva
- Member of: Alamat

Aaron Joshua Baldos Mitchell, professionally credited as Mo Mitchell or simply Mo, is a Filipino-American singer, songwriter, rapper, dancer, model, and actor. On February 14, 2021, he debuted in the Filipino boy band Alamat as one of their main vocalists and main rappers. He has been recognized as the first and only Afro-Asian idol in the P-pop industry. He has also accumulated various songwriting credits, such as being the sole lyricist of the song "Noli" from Isapuso. In September 2024, he was featured on "Lights Out" by Josh Cullen, who hand-picked him for the collaboration.

Mitchell has also appeared in the films Expensive Candy and 100 Awit Para Kay Stella. In January 2026, he was announced as one of the cast members in My Husband is a Mafia Boss, in the role of Spade Clifford.

== Early life and education ==
Aaron Joshua Baldos Mitchell was born on January 30, 2002 in Castillejos, Zambales, Philippines to a Filipino mother and Black American father.

== Career ==
=== 2020-present: Alamat, career expansion ===
Mitchell debuted as a member of the Filipino boy band Alamat. With their official concept emphasizing the Philippines' linguistic and cultural diversity, he represents his home province Zambales within the group. He is one of the group's main vocalists and main rappers. Jalen Jones of Mixed Asian Media noted that as of 2023, Mitchell remained the first and only Afro-Asian idol in the P-pop industry. Over the years, Mitchell has accumulated several songwriting credits for the group. For instance, he is the sole lyricist for "Noli", a track on Alamat's debut album Isapuso.

Mitchell had a bit part in the 2022 romance film Expensive Candy. In October 2023, he walked the runway at the BYS Fashion Week, modeling pieces by Antonina. In September 2024, his vocals were featured on "Lights Out", a track from Josh Cullen's on debut album Lost & Found. Juno Reyes of Rappler described Mitchell's parts as "classic R&B vocals" that helped the song build its romantic atmosphere. He is also credited for co-writing the song. In an interview with Billboard Philippines' Mayks Go, Cullen revealed that he hand-picked Mitchell for the feature. He also praised Mitchell's artistry following their collaboration, saying, "I had no words. In terms of lyrics and storytelling, Mo is on another level. As in, what an exceptional artist."

In February 2025, Mitchell performed "Lights Out" with Cullen at the latter's Lost & Found concert. Later in the year, Mitchell appeared in the Filipino romance film 100 Awit Para Kay Stella (transl. 100 Songs For Stella).

In January 2026, he was announced as one of the cast members for the upcoming romantic drama series My Husband is a Mafia Boss, portraying Spade Clifford.

== Filmography ==
Key
†	Denotes films that have not yet been released

=== Film ===
Year	Title	Role	Ref.
2022	Expensive Candy	Unnamed (bit part)	
2025	100 Awit Para Kay Stella	Doy	

=== Television ===
Year	Title	Role	Ref.
2022, 2024	Family Feud	Himself (contestant)	--
2025	Rainbow Rumble	Himself (contestant)	
2026	My Husband is a Mafia Boss	Spade Clifford	

== Discography ==
=== As lead artist ===
List of singles, showing year released and associated albums
Title	Year	Artist	Album	Ref
"Lights Out"	2024	Josh Cullen with Mo Mitchell	Lost & Found	

=== Songwriting credits ===
Credits are adapted from Tidal (Note: Attributed to multiple sources:) and Apple Music (Note: Attributed to multiple sources:), and official listings on YouTube (Note: Attributed to multiple sources:), unless otherwise stated.

List of songs, showing year released, artist name, and name of the album
Title	Year	Artist	Album	Lyricist	Composer
"Kbye"	2021	Alamat	Non-album single	Yes	Yes
"ABKD"	2022	Alamat	Pasulong	Yes	No
"Hala"	2022	Alamat	Pasulong	Yes	No
"Gayuma"	2023	Alamat	Pasulong	Yes	Yes
"Noli"	2023	Alamat	Isapuso	Yes	No
"Gupit"	2024	The Juans with Alamat	Non-album single	Yes	Yes
"Ngayong Gabi"	2024	Alamat with Nik Makino	Coke Studio Philippines Season 8	Yes	Yes
"Lights Out"	2024	Josh Cullen with Mo Mitchell	Lost & Found	Yes	Yes
