= Art+ Magazine =

Art magazine

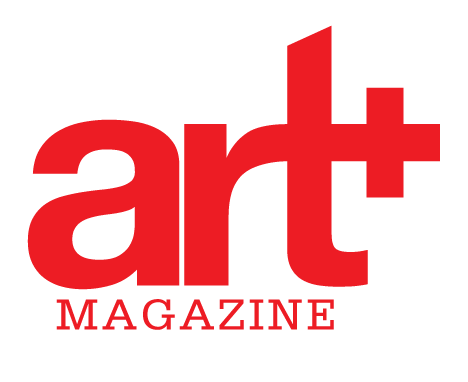
- Categories: Art magazines
- Frequency: Bi-monthly
- First issue: October 2008; 17 years ago
- Company: Southeast Asian Heritage Publications Inc.
- Based in: Mandaluyong, Philippines
- Language: English
- Website: www.artplus.ph

Art Plus Magazine (stylized as Art+ Magazine, formerly known as Contemporary Art Philippines) is a magazine published bi-monthly from Mandaluyong, Philippines. The magazine includes reviews of visual arts exhibitions in and around the Philippines as well as features on Philippine art, book, film, and theater reviews, a visual arts calendar, an auction update section, an exhibitions calendar, and a gallery directory. It also features the White Wall section, where guest contributors and curators select featured artwork around a theme. It is the only magazine in the Philippines to specialize in Philippine visual art.

The company's multimedia platform expanded in recent years with the launch of Art+ Magazine's e-commerce arm, Art+ Collectibles, in 2021. The online shop extended into an inclusive platform for up-and-coming local artists as it opened its online exhibition space through Art+ Discoveries. Recently, Art+ launched the first Modern and Contemporary Art Festival (alternatively known as MoCAF), featuring the fast-developing Philippine art scene, showcasing revered modern and contemporary masters and rising artists.

== History ==
Art+ Magazine was established in 2008 formerly as Contemporary Art Philippines. It is the longest-running visual arts magazine in the Philippines. The magazine is published once every two months (bi-monthly), or six times a year.

== Notable Contributors ==
- Cid Reyes
- Alice Guillermo
- Patrick Flores
- Lisa Ito
- Carlomar Daoana
- Patty Tumang
- Laurel Fantauzzo
- Siddharta Perez

== Editorial Team ==
- Managing Editor – Jewel Chuaunsu
- Art Director – Mark Anthomy L. Vivar
- Founder – Jack Teotico

== Awards ==
- Philippine Social Media Week – Social Media Excellence Award Arts & Lifestyle Category (2019)
- Printing Industries Association of the Philippines – Print Excellence 2018 Award - Magazine Category (2018)

== Published Issues ==
Published Issues of Art+ Magazine
| Title | No. | Cover Story |
|---|---|---|
| Contemporary; Art; Philippines | 1 | Philippine Art In Spotlight 2008 |
| Contemporary; Art; Philippines | 2 | The Sweeping Influence of Onib Olmedo |
| Contemporary; Art; Philippines | 3 | Into the World of Ronald Ventura |
| Contemporary; Art; Philippines | 4 | Rodel Tapaya Comes of Age |
| Contemporary; Art; Philippines | 5 | ManilArt09 Commemorative Issue |
| Contemporary; Art; Philippines | 6 | The Masters of Abstract Art |
| Contemporary; Art; Philippines | 7 | Ramon Orlina in the Limelight |
| Contemporary; Art; Philippines | 8 | What Lies Ahead For Philippine ArtExample |
| Contemporary; Art; Philippines | 9 | Women Sculptors on the Female Form |
| Contemporary; Art; Philippines | 10 | 100 Years of Social Realism |
| Contemporary; Art; Philippines | 11 | MANILART10 |
| Contemporary; Art; Philippines | 12 | FASHION + ART |
| Contemporary; Art; Philippines | 13 | Is the Philippines Ready for Art Auctions |
| Contemporary; Art; Philippines | 14 | The New Issue |
| Contemporary; Art; Philippines | 15 | Dominion of Memory |
| Contemporary; Art; Philippines | 16 | Modernism Revisited |
| Contemporary; Art; Philippines | 17 | MANILART11 |
| Contemporary; Art; Philippines | 18 | Purity in Photography |
| Contemporary; Art; Philippines | 19 | Anniversary Issue |
| Contemporary; Art; Philippines | 20 | Fakes and Forgeries |
| Contemporary; Art; Philippines | 21 | The Illustration Issue |
| Contemporary; Art; Philippines | 22 | The Photography Issue |
| Contemporary; Art; Philippines | 23 | ManilaArt12 |
| Contemporary; Art; Philippines | 24 | Carlos "Botong" Francisco Centennial |
| Art+ Magazine | 25 | The Missing Marcos Paintings |
| Art+ Magazine | 26 | Rene Cuvos |
| Art+ Magazine | 27 | Justin Nuyda |
| Art+ Magazine | 28 | Daniel dela Cruz |
| Art+ Magazine | 29 | National Artists Contenders |
| Art+ Magazine | 30 | Sculpture and Installation |
| Art+ Magazine | 31 | The Auction Issue |
| Art+ Magazine | 32 | Joe Datuin |
| Art+ Magazine | 33 | Art Basel Hong Kong |
| Art+ Magazine | 34 | Marcel Antonio |
| Art+ Magazine | 35 | Carlo Magno |
| Art+ Magazine | 36 | Rom Villaseran |
| Art+ Magazine | 37 | Abdumari Imao |
| Art+ Magazine | 38 | Anita Magsaysay-Ho |
| Art+ Magazine | 39 | BenCab |
| Art+ Magazine | 40 | Romulo Olazo |
| Art+ Magazine | 41 | Edwin Wilwayco |
| Art+ Magazine | 42 | Juanito Torres |
| Art+ Magazine | 43 | Alfonso Ossorio |
| Art+ Magazine | 44 | Ronald Ventura |
| Art+ Magazine | 45 | Eduardo Castrillo |
| Art+ Magazine | 46 | Jayson Cortez |
| Art+ Magazine | 47 | Timeless Sansó |
| Art+ Magazine | 48 | Riel Hilario |
| Art+ Magazine | 49 | Ross Capili |
| Art+ Magazine | 50 | 100 Years of Cesar Legaspi |
| Art+ Magazine | 51 | Roel Obemio |
| Art+ Magazine | 52 | Mario Parial |
| Art+ Magazine | 53 | Taverne Gutenberg |
| Art+ Magazine | 54 | Rediscovering Juan Luna |
| Art+ Magazine | 55 | Hoseki: The Art of Jewelry Design |
| Art+ Magazine | 56 | Raul Isidro |
| Art+ Magazine | 57 | Ram Mallari |
| Art+ Magazine | 58 | Illuminata: Ditta Sandico, Faico, Dominic Rubio |
| Art+ Magazine | 59 | Pierre Marie Brisson |
| Art+ Magazine | 60 | Anton del Castillo |
| Art+ Magazine | 61 | Ombok Villamor |
| Art+ Magazine | 62 | Fred Tan |
| Art+ Magazine | 63 | Aileen Lanuza |
| Art+ Magazine | 64 | Migs Villanueva |
| Art+ Magazine | 65 | Juvenal Sansó |
| Art+ Magazine | 66 | RV Basco |
| Art+ Magazine | 67 | Katrina Cuenca |
| Art+ Magazine | 68 | Benjie Mallari |
| Art+ Magazine | 69 | Michael Cacnio |
| Art+ Magazine | 70 | Dominic Rubio |
| Art+ Magazine | 71 | Sid Natividad |
| Art+ Magazine | 72 | Marc Aran Reyes |
| Art+ Magazine | 73 | Kenneth Montegrande |
| Art+ Magazine | 74 | Raul Lebajo |
| Art+ Magazine | 75 | Fitz Herrera |
| Art+ Magazine | 76 | Marge Organo |
| Art+ Magazine | 77 | Jomike Tejido |
| Art+ Magazine | 78 | Patrick Esmao |
| Art+ Magazine | 79 | Modern and Contemporary Art Festival (MoCAF) |

Published Books of Art+ Magazine
| === Title === | Year Published |
|---|---|
| Ode to the Abstract | 2021 |
| Brave New World coffee table book | 2022 |
