= Anton Del Castillo =

Filipino artist (born 1976)

- Born: Julius Anthony Del Castillo; January 13, 1976 (age 50); Tondo, Manila, Philippines
- Education: College of Fine Arts, University of the Philippines, Quezon City
- Known for: Pop art, mixed-media installations, modern art, figurative art, conceptual art

Anton Del Castillo (born 1976 in Tondo, Manila, Philippines) is a Filipino visual artist known for his sculptures, paintings, and mixed-media works. His artworks often explore themes related to modernism and contemporary society

Del Castillo has produced steel sculptures and paintings influenced by Byzantine iconography, and his work has been noted for its detailed craftsmanship and design.

== Education ==
Del Castillo received his BFA and MFA degrees from the College of Fine Arts, University of the Philippines in Diliman, Quezon City, the Philippines. He is also a trained art restorer, having undertaken training in the restoration department of the National Museum of the Philippines.

== Critical acclaim ==
Del Castillo has been noted for playing with the themes of war and religion, childhood and lost innocence, and the transformation of meaning through time. In series dealing with warfare in multimedia works and ancient and contemporary icons in gold leaf paintings, his intention has been said "to showcase the similarities of belief towards achieving peace, which is the precedent of war or vice versa." Inspired also by his own childhood memories, Del Castillo, in other series such as his metal works and mixed media toys, also attempts to refashion innocence and playfulness amidst the locus of art and its seriousness, ultimately embracing the act of production itself as the main motive of his art, samples of which have been praised as not only "playful but also powerful." By accomplishing such feats, he has been said to communicate the essence of transformation, technological advancement, and enlightenment by creating culturally informed imagery. Meanwhile, others see his work as symbolic of rigid modernity where "life is a lackluster cycle."

== Commercial success ==
Several works by the artist have been sold at auction, including "Toy Soldier 4" at Salcedo Auctions.

== Solo exhibitions of Del Castillo ==
- 2003 Mutiny, Cultural Center of the Philippines (CCP), Pasay, Philippines
- 2005 Under One Roof, Small Gallery, CCP, Manila, Philippines
- 2007 Crossing Boundaries, Art Space, Makati, PH; Anton del Castillo, International Studio and Curatorial Program, Rm 704, NY, USA
- 2009 Psych War, Alliance Total Gallery, Makati, Philippines
- 2009 Conquistador, NOVA Gallery, Makati, Philippines
- 2010 Retrospective Play, Outerspace Gallery, The Collective, Makati, Philippines
- 2011 Unwanted Fate: New Works by Anton del Castillo, Altro Mondo Arte Contemporanea Gallerie, Makati, Philippines
- 2012 In the Landscape of Having to Repeat, Altro Mondo Arte Contemporanea Gallerie, The Picasso Boutique Serviced Residences, Makati, Philippines
- 2012 Tribulation, Now Gallery, Makati, Philippines
- 2012 Iconodulum, Now Gallery, Makati, Philippines
- 2013 Traffic Signs, Now Gallery, Makati, Philippines
- 2013 BUENVIAJE: An Ode to Good Voyage, UP Vargas Museum
- 2013 Absence, Canvas Gallery and Garden, Quezon City, Philippines
- 2014 Anatomy to Flight, Altro Mondo Arte Contemporanea Gallerie, The Picasso Boutique Serviced Residences, Makati, Philippines

== Group exhibitions ==
- 2000 Resurrecting the Past, National Museum of the Philippines, Manila, Philippines
- 2003 One by One, Ayala Museum, Makati, Philippines
- 2004 First Exhibition of International Art Expo Korea, Seoul, South Korea
- 2007 Outbound, Ateneo Art Awards, Makati, Philippines
- 2007 A Question of Perspective, Asian Cultural Council, The Lee Gardens, Hong Kong, China
- 2007 The Most Curatorial Biennal of the Universe, Apexart Gallery, New York, United States
- 2008 Art Beijing, Beijing, China
- 2008 Up in monochromes, UNESCO Salle de pas Perdu, Paris, France
- 2009 LARASATI, HT Contemporary Art Space, Singapore
- 2009 Cultural Warfare, Big and Small Gallery, Makati, Philippines
- 2011 Topak, All in the Mind, UP Vargas Museum, Quezon City, Philippines
- 2011 Flowershow: Contemporary Takes on the Floral, Krem Contemporary Art, Quezon City, Philippines
- 2014 Design Insights Philippines, Yuchengco Museum, Makati, Philippines
- 2014 A Child's Memory, Ateneo Art Gallery, Quezon City, Philippines
- 2014 PIGS Politics, Immortality, Gods and Society, Helutrans Artspace, Singapore

== Recognition and fellowships ==
- 1995 Finalist, oil category, 28th Shell National Students Art Competition
- 1997 Finalist, oil category, Shell National Students Art Competition, Manila
- 1999 Finalist, Winton and Newton Millennium International Art Competition, Museo ng Maynila
- 1999 Semi-finalist, oil category, Metrobank Foundation Young Painters Annual Art Competition
- 2002 Semi-finalist, oil category, Metrobank Foundation Young Painters Annual Art Competition
- 2002 Special Prize, 7th Letras Y Figuras National Painting Competition, Metropolitan Museum, Manila
- 2003 Honorable mention, mixed media category, 56th Art Association of the Philippines Competition
- 2003 Grand Prize, oil category, Metrobank Young Painters Painting Annual Art Competition
- 2003 1st place, oil category, Metrobank Young Painters Painting Annual Art Competition
- 2004 1st place, 1st Filipino Youth Cultural Expo Painting Competition, Manila
- 2005 Alternate Freeman Fellowship Grant, Vermont Studio Center, United States
- 2006 Short-listed, Rijksakademie van Beeldende Kunsten, Amsterdam, Netherlands
- 2006 Semi-finalist, Beppu Asia Biennial of Contemporary Art, Beppu Art Museum, Beppu, Oita, Japan
- 2006 Short-listed, Ateneo Arts Award for the exhibition Under One Roof
- 2006 ACC Fellowship residency, ISCP
- 2006 Grantee, Sovereign Foundation Hong Kong Fellowship Grant
- 2006 Finalist, Philip Morris Philippines Arts Award, 2006 National Painting Competition
- 2006 Grantee, Asian Cultural Council Grant, International Studio and Curatorial Program, New York City, United States
- 2011 Finalist, Tanaw Bangko Sentral ng Pilipinas National Art Competition, Manila, Philippines
- 2011 Schoeni Prize, Sovereign Asian Art Competition, Hong Kong, China
- 2012 Finalist, Oita Asian Sculpture Competition, Ōita, Japan
- 2012 Finalist, Oita Asian Sculpture Competition, Ōita, Japan
- 2012 Finalist, Oita Asian Sculpture Competition, Ōita, Japan
- 2014 Artist II rank, Arts Productivity System Award, University of the Philippines, Diliman
- 2014 Finalist, Oita Asian Sculpture Competition, Ōita, Japan
- 2014 Metrobank Foundation Award for Continuing Excellence and Service (ACES)
- 2014 Jurors Choice, Metro Manila Winner, Philip Morris Philippines Arts Award, Manila
- 2014 Schoeni Prize, Sovereign Asian Art Competition, Hong Kong, China

== Sources ==
- Flores, Patrick. "Motifs of War", Nova Gallery catalogue.
- Jalbuena, Samito. "The game theory of Anton del Castillo", BusinessMirror, December 2, 2014.
- Jalbuena, Samito. "Portraits for the end of the world", BusinessMirror, January 27, 2015.
