= Chanty (singer) =

Filipino singer and actress (born 2002)

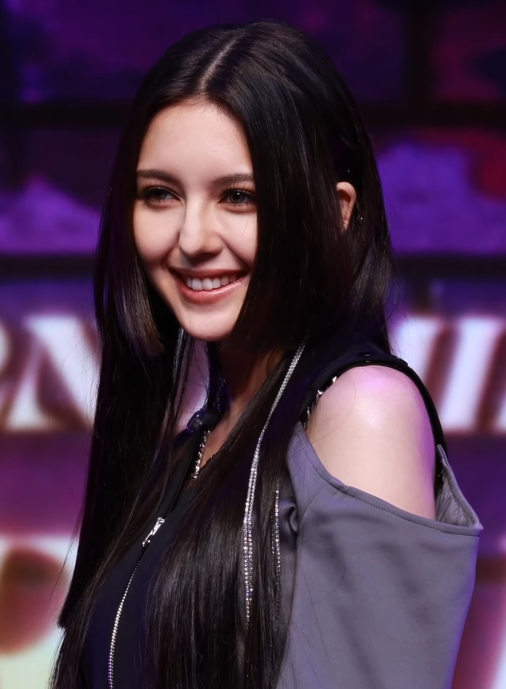
- Chanty in June 2023
- Born: Maria Chantal Videla; December 15, 2002 (age 23); Manila, Philippines
- Other name: Chantal Videla
- Occupations: Singer; actress; model
- Years active: 2018–present
- Agent(s): Sparkle
- Hometown: Mendoza, Argentina
- Musical career
- Origin: South Korea
- Genre: K-pop
- Years active: 2022–present
- Label: MLD
- Member of: Lapillus

Maria Chantal Videla (born December 15, 2002), better known by her stage name Chanty (Korean: 샨티), is a Filipino singer and actress. She is a member of the South Korean girl group Lapillus. Following the group's hiatus, she returned to the Philippines and appeared in various television programs such as Maka (2024) and season two of the reality dance competition series Stars on the Floor (2026).

== Life and career ==
=== 2002–2017: Early life ===
Chanty was born Maria Chantal Videla on December 15, 2002, in Manila, Philippines, to an Argentine father and Filipino mother. She belongs to a large family, being the fifth of eight siblings, with four older brothers and three younger sisters. Shortly after her birth, her family moved to Mendoza, Argentina where she grew up with her younger sisters. Later on, she moved back to the Philippines where she started her modelling and acting career.

=== 2018–2020: Career beginnings ===
On March 23, 2018, Chanty was introduced as one of the new stars under Star Magic Batch 2018, along with many young actors. She made her acting debut in the supernatural series Spirits: Reawaken as Gabbie, a teenage girl with mysterious superpowers. A year later, she played a major role in the 2019 Philippine film Familia Blondina, marking this as her big screen debut. Chanty also starred on ABS-CBN's television drama series Hiwaga ng Kambat and Starla.

=== 2021–present: Lapillus, GMA Network ===
In an interview with The Korea Times, Chanty recalled that her father's friend offered her to go to South Korea to become part of a K-pop girl group, to which she accepted, citing her interest in K-pop, as well as in Korean dramas. Chanty would later be trained under MLD Entertainment for eight months, until she was introduced as a member of the girl group Lapillus, on May 25, 2022. Her group debuted on June 20, 2022, with the release of their first digital single, "Hit Ya!".

In the Philippines, Chanty transferred to GMA Network and signed an exclusive contract with Sparkle, on November 11, 2022. In April 2024, MLD Entertainment announced that Chanty would be taking an indefinite hiatus from Lapillus due to her developing ME/CFS. On August 14, 2024, Chanty was cast in the youth series Maka. She resumed her activities with Lapillus in November 2024, during the group's tour of Japan.

In 2026, she participated in season two of the reality dance competition series Stars on the Floor. She finished in second place with her Dance Star Duo partner, Jao Canlas of Alamat.

== Filmography ==
=== Film ===
Year	Title	Role	Ref.
2019	Familia Blondina	Cameron	
2025	Samahan ng mga Makasalanan	Amy	

=== Television series ===
Year	Title	Role	Notes	Ref.
2018	Spirits: Reawaken	Gabbie		
2019	Hiwaga ng Kambat	Lorraine Maniquis		
2019	Starla	Lena Batumbakal		
2020	I Got You	Iya		
2024	Pepito Manaloto: Tuloy Ang Kwento	Candy	Special appearance	
2024–2025	Maka	Chanty Villanueva	Season 1–3	
2025	Sanggang-Dikit FR	Mira Torres		
2025	Maka Lovestream	Stacy		
2026	Stars on the Floor	Herself	Season two	
2026	Kamao	Chloe Olivares		
