= Jao Canlas =

Filipino model and singer-dancer (born 2002)

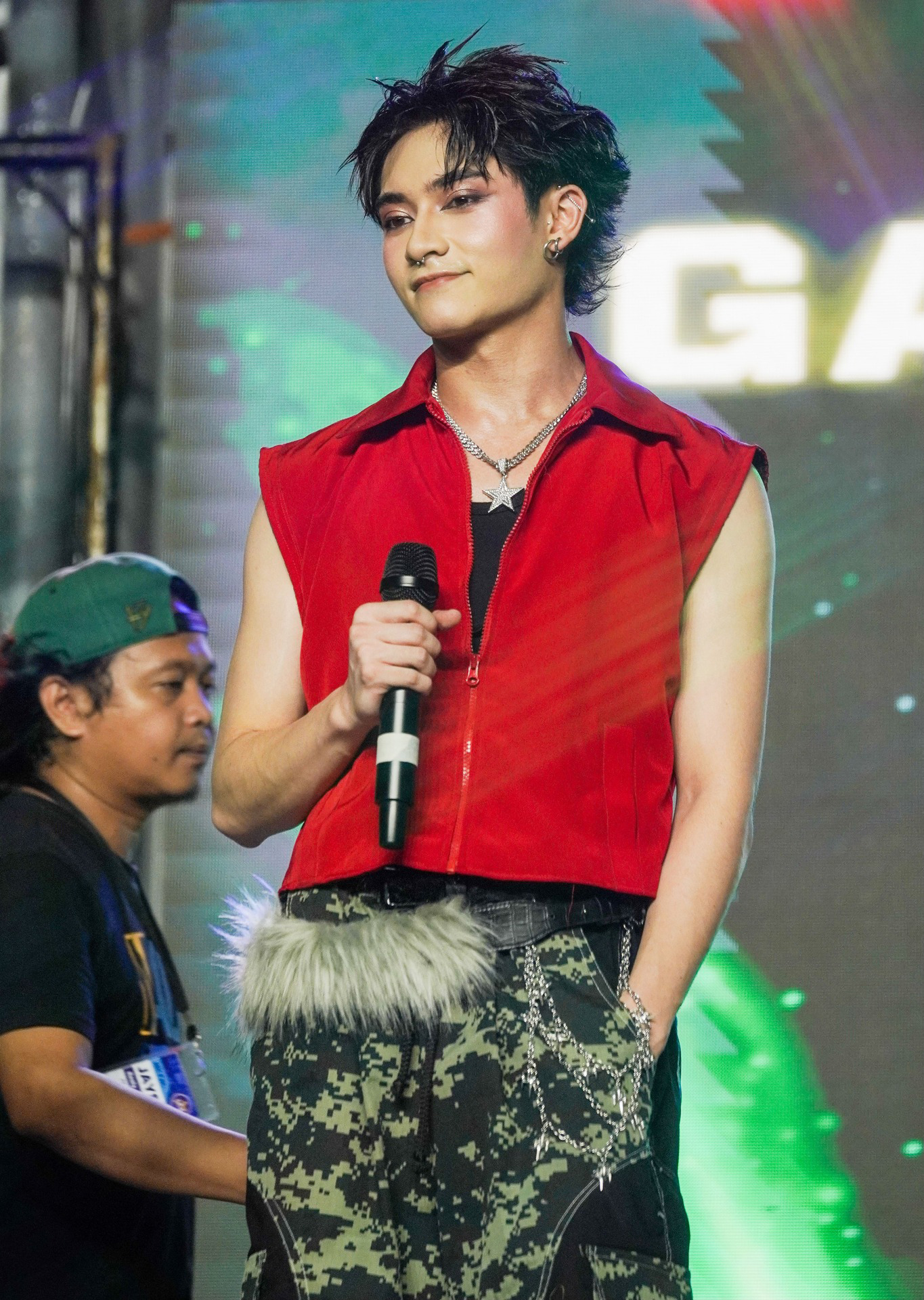
- Canlas in November 2025
- Born: Justin Paolo Paras Canlas; December 26, 2002 (age 23); Magalang, Pampanga, Philippines
- Occupations: Dancer; singer; model; actor
- Years active: 2020–present
- Musical career
- Genres: P-pop
- Label: Viva
- Member of: Alamat

Justin Paolo Paras Canlas, known by his stage name Jao and professionally credited as Jao Canlas, is a Filipino singer, dancer, model, and actor. On February 14, 2021, he debuted as one of the Filipino boy band Alamat's main dancers and sub-vocalists. He is widely recognized by the media for his distinctive sense of style. In 2023, he won Top Male Dancer of the Year at the 8th P-pop Awards.

Canlas portrays Onel Ty, the vice president in the titular school's Supreme Student Government, in the mystery horror series Hell University. He also participated as a contestant on season two of the reality dance competition series Stars on the Floor.

== Early life and education ==
Justin Paolo Paras Canlas was born on December 26, 2002 in Magalang, Pampanga, Philippines.

== Career ==
=== 2020–present: Debuting in Alamat, growing recognition ===
In 2020, Canlas auditioned for Viva Records' new boy band project. The members underwent intensive training for nine months, which encompassed singing, dancing, physical fitness, and personality development. Their training also included acting workshops. On February 14, 2021, Canlas was among the nine members who debuted as Alamat (transl. Legend), with the multilingual song "Kbye", which had lyrics in various Philippine languages. A few weeks after "Kbye" was released, Alamat became the second P-pop group to make it on Billboard's Next Big Sound chart after SB19, debuting at number two. They were also regarded as the fastest-rising Filipino act on the chart. Canlas was given the positions of main dancer and sub-vocalist.

He walked the runway at BYS Fashion Week 2023 in October, modeling pieces by Antonina. In April 2024, he went viral after he started the hashtag "#canceljao" on X. It reportedly shocked his fans, although they quickly realized that Canlas himself created it with humorous, lighthearted intentions, and trended in the Philippines from April 22 to 25.

In September, he appeared in an episode of Billboard Philippines Volumes, alongside other P-pop idols such as G22's AJ and Kaia's Angela. A separate photoshoot and interview with Franz of Vxon accompanied the episode. In the interview, the two discussed their identity as Filipinos, with Canlas mentioning his love for his home province and native language, Kapampangan. On June 28, 2025, he was one of the hosts for Lov3laban, a Pride Month celebration held in Quezon City, at the University of the Philippines Diliman.

Canlas portrays Onel Ty, the vice president in the titular school's Supreme Student Government, in the mystery horror series Hell University (2026).

Canlas is also a contestant on season two of Stars on the Floor, a dance reality competition show. On February 11, he competed in the "More Tawa, More Saya, More Love" (transl. More Laughs, More Happiness, More Love) episode of Family Feud alongside his Stars on the Floor castmates.

In the first episode of Stars season two, Canlas paired up with Sugar Mercado in a carnival-themed dancehall performance. He finished in second place overall with his Dance Duo Partner, actress-singer Chanty.

In September, Canlas walked the runway at MNL Fashion Week wearing Antonina.

== Other ventures ==
He has his own clothing line called Space Station.

== Media image ==
=== Fashion ===
In their July 2024 issue, the Filipino fashion magazine Mega included Canlas in their list of Gen Z fashion leaders. Nylon Manila's Acer Batislaong wrote that "mixing style and swag together" is his signature. In another article for the magazine, Nica Glorioso described his style as maximalist. On October 30, 2025, the Filipino fashion magazine Preview included Canlas in their best-dressed list for the Manila Fashion Week 2025.

=== Endorsements ===
On April 4, 2024, Colourette Cosmetics unveiled Canlas as their new ambassador.

== Personal life ==
Canlas is openly a member of the LGBTQ+ community. He is also disabled.

== Filmography ==
Key
†	Denotes films that have not yet been released

=== Television ===
Year	Title	Role	Ref.
2026	Hell University	Onel Ty	
2026	Family Feud	Himself (contestant)	
2026	Stars on the Floor (Season 2)	Himself (contestant)	

== Awards and nominations ==
Award	Year	Category	Result	Ref.
8th P-pop Awards	2023	Top Male Dancer of the Year	Won	
