= One Music PH =

Filipino music website

- Logo of One Music PH as of 2021
- Website type: Music Media Brand
- Available in: English, Filipino
- Founded: January 3, 2016; 10 years ago
- Dissolved: August 31, 2020; 6 years ago (temporary)
- Owner: ABS-CBN Corporation
- Website: www.onemusic.ph
- Launched: January 3, 2016; 10 years ago (first launch); August 2021; 5 years ago (second launch)

One Music Philippines (also known as One Music PH) is a Filipino online music hub owned by ABS-CBN Corporation under the media conglomerate's ABS-CBN Music Ecosystem. One Music PH's website went live in November 2015, but the brand was officially launched on noontime musical variety show ASAP on June 3, 2016 with performances from Yeng Constantino, Ylona Garcia, Erik Santos, and Jed Madela among others.

== History ==
Logo of One Music PH from 2016 to 2020.

Initially a discovery platform for new music artists, One Music PH has then produced musical shows like One Music POPSSSS (hosted by Alexa Ilacad, Iñigo Pascual, Maris Racal, John Roa, Tony Labrusca, AC Bonifacio, and Ryle Santiago), One Music LIVE, and Wander Jam (hosted by Migz Haleco, Sue Ramirez, and Ryle). One Music PH was also known for their Digital Concerts, with Yeng Constantino kick-starting said concert series with her "Yeng Constantino: Salamat Sa Sampung Taon" concert.

The brand is also responsible for the creation of "One Paradise," a musical event that advocates for environment protection through music with the first two concerts being held in La Union

One Music PH temporary stopped its operations on August 31, 2020, as part of the retrenchment by ABS-CBN Corporation, due to denial of ABS-CBN's legislative franchise by the House of Representatives on July 10, 2020.

In August 2021, One Music PH resumed its operations following the announcement of ABS-CBN's expansion of digital content thru YouTube. It was also announced that the brand is set to launch "The Music Room", a weekly digital concert series featuring breakout Filipino artists exclusively on One Music PH's YouTube channel.

== Shows ==
=== Current ===
Show Title	Host
The Music Room	—N/a

=== Previous ===
Show Title	Host
One Music LIVE	Jed Madela, Bugoy Drilon
One Music POPSSSS	Alexa Ilacad, Inigo Pascual, Tony Labrusca, Maris Racal, John Roa, AC Bonifacio, Ryle Santiago
Wander Jam	Migz Haleco, Sue Ramirez, Ryle Santiago
One Music Luh?!	Kisses Delavin, Tony Labrusca
