= Kaia (group) =

Filipino girl group

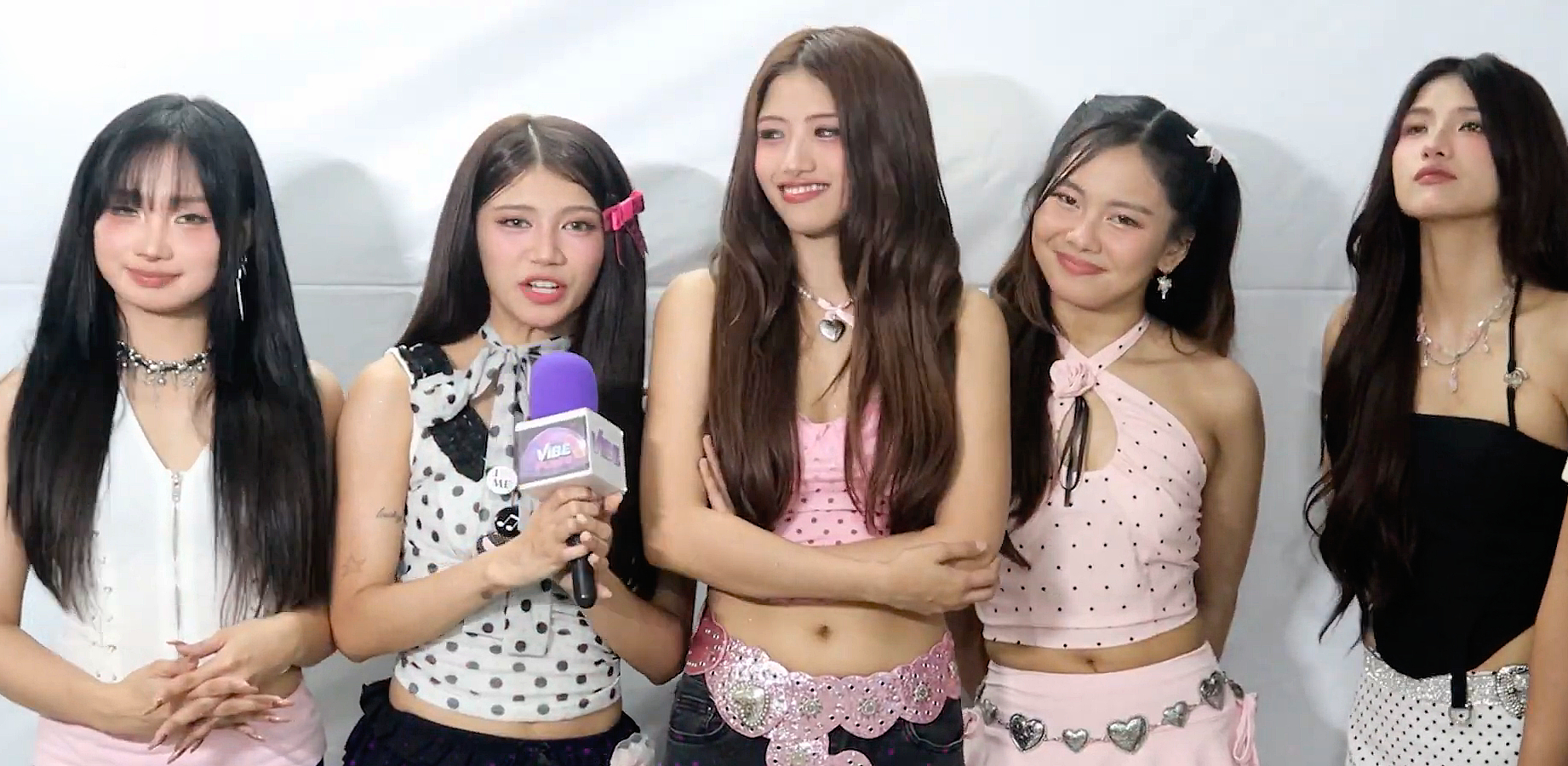
- Kaia in June 2026 (left to right): Alexa, Charlotte, Angela, Sophia, Charice

Background information
- Origin: Manila, Philippines
- Genres: P-pop; bubblegum pop; dance; trap; hip-hop
- Years active: 2021–present
- Labels: Sony Philippines; ShowBT Philippines
- Members: Charice; Angela; Alexa; Sophia; Charlotte
- Past members: Joanna

Kaia (stylized in all caps) is a Filipino girl group. The quintet consists of twin sisters Charice and Angela, Alexa, Sophia, and Charlotte. Their pre-debut single "Kaya" was released on December 10, 2021. The group officially debuted on April 8, 2022, with debut single "Blah Blah".

== Name ==
The group's name comes from the Cebuano word kinaiya, which means "inner character and a person’s individuality". In addition, it is homophonous to the Filipino word kaya, which is defined as the "capability to get through obstacles".

== Members ==
- Charlotte – rapper, vocalist and dancer
- Angela – leader, vocalist and dancer
- Sophia – vocalist and dancer
- Alexa – rapper and dancer
- Charice – rapper and dancer

== Discography ==
=== Singles ===
==== As a lead artist ====
List of singles, showing associated albums
Title	Year	Album
"Kaya"	2021	Non-album singles
"A Perfect Christmas" (featuring Jose Mari Chan)	2022	Non-album singles
"Dalawa"	2022	Non-album singles
"Blah Blah"	2022	Non-album singles
"5678"	2023	Non-album singles
"Turn Up"	2023	Non-album singles
"You Did It"	2024	Non-album singles
"Walang Biruan"	2024	Non-album singles
"Tanga"	2025	Non-album singles
"Walkie Talkie" (with ZIV)	2025	Non-album singles
"Tara Sayaw"	2025	Non-album singles
"Hulog"	2026	Non-album singles

== Filmography ==
=== Television ===
Year	Month/Date	Program	Ref.
2022	April 21	Unang Hirit	
2022	May 29	All-Out Sundays	
2022	July 29	Tropang LOL	

=== Webcast ===
Year	Title	Ref.
2022	WomenOfTiktok	
2022	Kumu: P-popsilog	

== Concerts ==
=== Headlining concerts ===
List of headlining concerts, showing co-headliners, dates, and locations
Event name	Co-headliner(s)	Dates	City	Country	Ref.
PPOPCON 2022	Various (Note: In addition to Kaia, several other artists also headlined PPOPCON 2022, including Bini, 1st.One, Press Hit Play, SB19, MNL48, BGYO, VXON, Alamat, and 4th Impact.)	April 10, 2022	Quezon City	Philippines	
Kaia is Here: Kaia's 1st Solo Concert	—N/a	December 19, 2023	San Juan	Philippines	

=== Guest appearances ===
List of concert guest appearances, showing headlining artists, dates, and locations
Event name	Dates	City	Country	Ref.
SB19 Dunkin' Donut Concert	April 23, 2022	Quezon City	Philippines	
Acer Day 2022: The Green Mark Concert	August 7, 2022	Pasay	Philippines	
Kumu is 4 U: Birthday Concert	September 2, 2022	Taguig	Philippines	
WYAT (Where You At) Tour	October 15, 2022	Cebu City	Philippines	
Popstival 2022	October 21, 2022	Pasay	Philippines	
WYAT (Where You At) Tour	November 27, 2022	Singapore		

== Accolades ==
=== Awards and nominations ===
Award ceremony	Year	Category	Nominee / Work	Result	Ref.
Awit Awards	2022	Favorite Group Artist	Kaia	Nominated	
Nylon Manila	2021	Favorite New Song Of December	"Kaya"	Nominated	
Nylon Manila	2023	Favorite Rookie P-Pop Group	Kaia	Nominated	
P-pop Music Awards	2022	P-pop Girl Group of the Year	Kaia	Nominated	
P-pop Music Awards	2023	P-pop Girl Group of the Year	Kaia	Won	
P-pop Music Awards	2024	Rising Girl Group of the Year	Kaia	Won	
P-pop Music Awards	2024	Vocal Arrangement in a Song	"You Did It"	Won	
P-pop Music Awards	2024	Choreography in a Live Performance	"Walang Biruan"	Nominated	
Rawr Awards	2022	Favorite Group	Kaia	Nominated	
TikTok Awards Philippines	2022	P-pop Group of the Year	Kaia	Nominated	
Village Pipol Choice Award	2023	Group Performer of the Year	Kaia	Nominated	

=== Listicles ===
Name of publisher, name of listicle, year listed, and placement result
Publisher	Listicle	Year	Result	Ref.
Billboard Philippines	P-pop Rising Class	2025	Placed	
