= When in Manila =

Philippine online guide

WhenInManila Inc.
- Type: Private
- Industry: Electronic publishing; Technology
- Founded: September 1, 2009; 17 years ago
- Founders: Vince Golangco
- Headquarters: Manila, Philippines
- Key people: Vince Golangco (CEO); Sky Gavin (COO)
- Number of employees: ▲22 (2023); 15 (2022)
- Website: wheninmanila.com

When in Manila is an online metro guide book focused on Manila and the Philippines. It was created by Vince Golangco on September 1, 2009. The site publishes news, reviews, and information on various topics, including food, culture, music, fashion, travel, and lifestyle.

== History ==
When in Manila creator Vince Golangco, after studying and working in the US, traveled the world and settled in the Philippines because he fell in love with the country. He originally launched When In Manila as a video blog, with a staff of four: a writer (Golangco), two videographers, and a webmaster. The group soon realized that they were spending the majority of their time handling video production, yet their videos were not getting as many views as their articles. They began focusing on the written content instead. "We were actually renting a big expensive camera for ₱10,000 per day, and trying to cram in as much shooting time as possible. Then one day I was at a restaurant I wanted to feature and didn't have my crew with me, so I just took a bad video with my camera, that video ended up getting more views than the professional videos we did," Golangco observed.

On July 5, 2013, When in Manila won Best Photo Blog/Microblog at the Tatt Awards, and as a result, the #wheninmanila hashtag trended on Twitter Philippines well into the next morning as a result of netizens tweeting and retweeting the news. This was later revealed to have been planned by their digital media consultant.

As of August 2013, it was reported that When in Manila has over 350,000 visitors per month, and has more than 1 million social media followers. According to the Philippine Daily Inquirer, Alexa.com ranked When in Manila as the 3rd most popular metro guide in the Philippines.

== Content ==
The content of articles published by When In Manila is grouped into the following sections: news & features, food & restaurants, nightlife & events, travel & adventure, lifestyle & places, and fashion & beauty. The editorial tone is "positive"." When in Manila is written in an informal tone.

== Awards ==
- Digital Filipino – #1 Emerging Influential Blog
  2010
- Unilever/Sooo Pinoy – Ultimate Food Blogger - Mae Ilagan
  2012
- Rotary Club of Manila – Tourism Award – Vince Golangco
  2012
- Tatt Awards – Best Photo Blog/Microblog
  2013

== See also ==
- List of websites about food and drink
