= Nik Makino =

Filipino rapper (born 1995)

- Born: Nikolson Makino
- Origin: Tondo, Manila
- Genre: Pinoy hip hop
- Occupation: Rapper
- Years active: 2011–present
- Label: Believe Music
- Partner: Krystal Kate "Siobe Lim" Mana

Nikolson Makino, better known as Nik Makino, is a Filipino rapper. He grew up in Tondo, Manila, and began rapping at the age of 16. His tracks "Neneng B" and "Lexi" went viral in 2020 but drew criticism for their perceived sexual objectification of women.

After he started a family, Makino grew concerned about how children listening to his music were influenced. On his debut album, Hype One's (2022), Makino aimed to take his music in a more wholesome and personal direction. He appeared on the Billboard Philippines Songs chart twice with the Flow G collaborations "Moon" (2022) and "We Made It" (2024). With his next album, THE ALBUM IS DONE (2025), Makino wanted to balance the brash energy of his youth with his more self-aware side.

== Life and career ==
=== Early life and career ===
Nikolson Makino grew up in Abad Santos, Tondo, and divides his time between the Philippines and the U.S. state of New Jersey. Makino started rapping in 2011 as a 16-year-old. His early releases were a series of mixtapes and extended plays (EPs), including Most Needed Mixtape, Now I Know, Love Lust Lies Mixtape, and It's Nik Mixtape.

=== "Neneng B" era (2019–2020) ===
Makino rose to popularity with the singles "Neneng B", a collaboration with Raf Davis, and "Lexi", which garnered a combined 95 million views. "Neneng B" went viral during the COVID-19 pandemic, but both songs proved controversial because of their sexually explicit lyrics and Makino attracted many critics. Lino Brocka's organization, the Concerned Artists of the Philippines, criticized "Neneng B" for "[reinforcing] the idea that women exist to be fetishized for male pleasure", like many other artists who "tread this well-worn path of toxic and fragile masculinity.” In November 2019, a European producer, known as Roko Tensei, threatened to sue Makino and Davis, alleging that "Neneng B" had stolen his beat "Relax". Makino claimed that he had already paid for the beat. They later reached an out-of-court settlement.

Makino said that he decided to move on from his "bad boy" image after he found out children were listening to "Neneng B" at parties. He considered what kind of influence he wanted to have with his music. He also wanted to change personally, having become a family man. He had settled down with his now-wife Krystal Kate "Siobe Lim" Mana, the model from the "Neneng B" music video, and began raising his newborn daughter, born in 2020 or 2021. According to the Manila Standard, Makino now wanted make songs about "self-realization and [celebrating] family, friendship, and some clean, laid-back fun"—music that had a "lasting impact".

=== Believe, Hype One's, and collaborations (2020–2022) ===
Makino was Believe AS Philippines' first signee, and his first projects under the label were the EPs Aye Mami (2020)—which Makino called his transition from his "fuckboy" image—Bouncy Boy, featuring collaborations with Shao Lin and Kenzo, and Censored (both 2021). Believe noticed him because his large social media following; he often posts vlogs online and also has many TikTok followers. Makino said he suffered depression during his first year with Believe and had to reflect on why he chose to do music. Believe mostly gave Makino creative freedom, and Makino built his own home studio.

On January 15, 2022, Makino released the single "Dahan Lang", which featured A. Ross. He released "Pag-Ibig Sayo" for Valentine's Day. "Ready Ka", featuring Dash Calzado, came out days before he released his debut album Hype One's (2022). A mellower and more personal record, its 14 songs were inspired by the 26-year-old's journey both in his music and his personal life. According to Makino, he wanted his listeners to connect to his music more positively and be inspired to follow their own goals. Makino has credited his partner, Siobe Lim, for his success, saying that his accomplishments would not have come about if she had not stuck by him. He has also stated that he was focused on making music he enjoyed rather than pursuing hits, and that his songs were based on self-reflection.

For Hype One's, Makino tried to distance himself from "Neneng B" and "Lexi" and took inspiration from the more laidback sound of his earlier songs. On the trap song "Moon", Makino and the featuring artist, Flow G, rap about the high and low points of their respective careers. "Moon" peaked at No. 16 on the Billboard Philippines Songs chart in September, and Makino and Flow G performed the song at the 8th Wish Music Awards ceremony. Other songs had a pop rap sound; Makino sings about watching the sunset and counting the stars.

On June 17, 2022, Makino featured on DAZE's single "G.G.D." (Good Girl Drug). He was the featuring artist and co-writer of KZ Tandingan's "Pinas Lang Malakas", the theme song for the Filipino teams Blacklist and Echo at the MLBB M4 World Championship, which was released on December 28, 2022.

=== Further collaborations and THE ALBUM IS DONE (2024–present) ===
In January 2024, Makino and Flow G released the song "We Made It" alongside a music video that featured futuristic cityscapes of Manila. It became Makino's second song to chart on Billboard Philippines Songs, peaking at No. 7 in February 2024. Actor Miguel Tanfelix participated in a popular TikTok challenge set to the song which followed dance moves by choreographer Jay Joseph. Makino's second single for the year, "Sobrang Solid" (Super Solid), was a collaboration with producer NexxFriday. For Coke Studio, Makino and the boy band Alamat released their collaborative track "Ngayong Gabi" (Tonight) and performed at the Ultimate Fandom Concert in Manila's MOA Arena on September 5. Makino also collaborated with fellow Filipino rapper Shao Lin on the five-track META MIXTAPE (2024).

Makino released seven singles in 2025, including more collaborations with Shao Lin, Robledo Timido, and TreyLow Baby. In August, Makino collaborated with MC Einstein and Yeng Constantino on the single "Mahal Kita". The song originated from a demo that Makino sent to MC Einstein in 2022. MC Einstein approached Constantino, his labelmate at Cornerstone Entertainment, to perform on the track in 2024. Her participation came as a surprise to Makino, who idolized the singer. However, Makino and MC Einstein had to wait for a year because Constantino had a busy schedule. The song combines the respective genres of the three artists: Makino and hip-hop, MC Einstein and R&B, and Constantino and pop rock.

On October 17, 2025, Makino released THE ALBUM IS DONE, which he called his "last hip-hop album for now". Makino told Rolling Stone Philippines that he wanted to capture a side of himself that is more personal and self-aware, while letting the rebellious (balagbag) energy he had in his youth continue to come through.

== Discography ==
- Hype One's (2022)
- THE ALBUM IS DONE (2025)
