= Maris Racal =

Filipino actress, model and singer (born 1997)

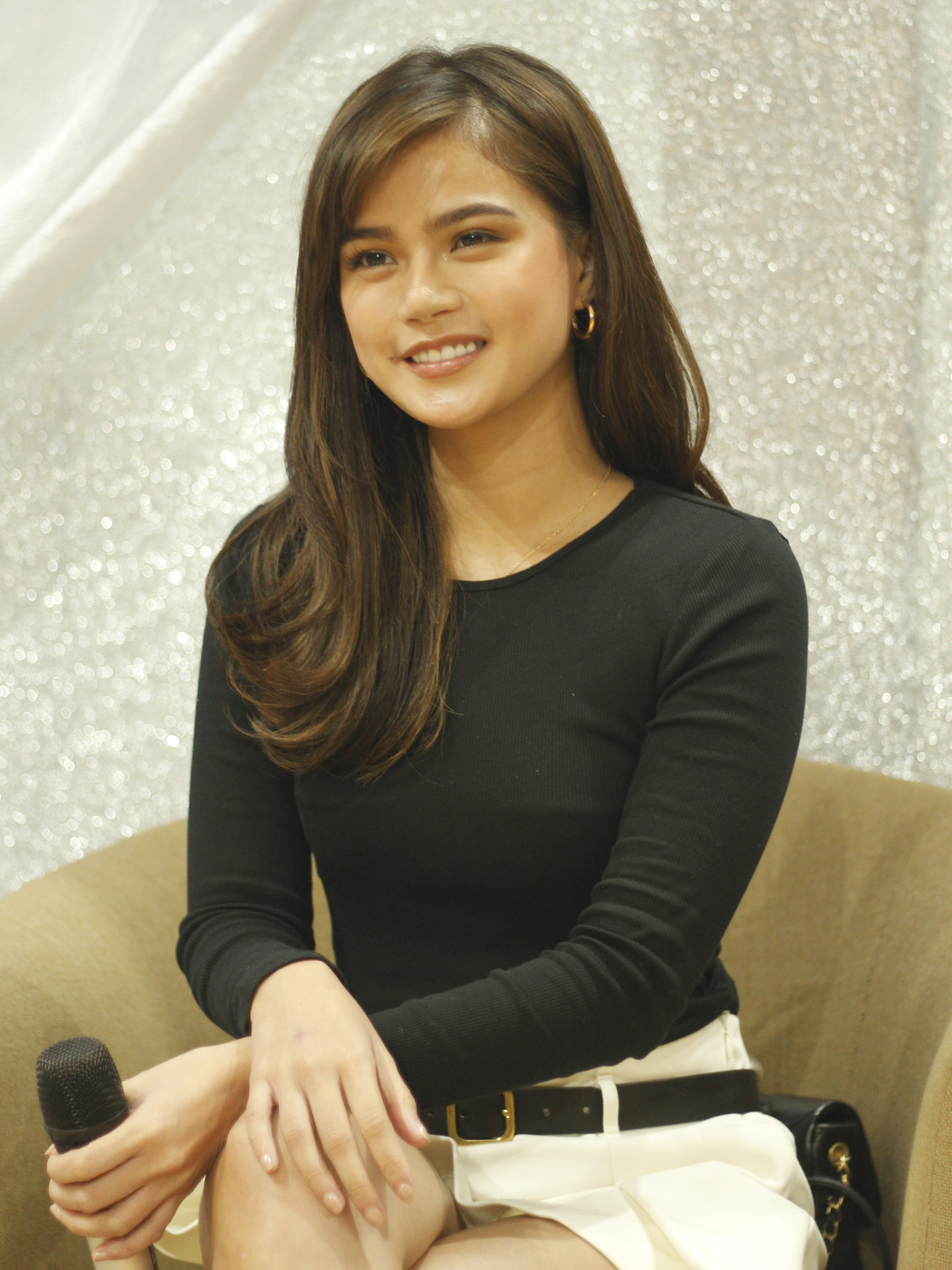
- Racal in 2024
- Born: Mariestella Cañedo Racal; September 22, 1997 (age 29); Tagum, Davao del Norte, Philippines
- Occupations: Actress; dancer; singer-songwriter; vlogger; endorser; entrepreneur
- Years active: 2014–present
- Agents: Star Magic; (2014–present)
- Musical career
- Genres: OPM; pop
- Instruments: Vocals; guitar
- Labels: Star Music (2015–2019); Balcony Entertainment (2020–present); Sony Music Philippines (2020–present)

Mariestella "Maris" Cañedo Racal (Tagalog: [maˈɾis kaˈɲɛdo ɾaˈkal]; born September 22, 1997) is a Filipino actress and singer. She rose to prominence in 2014 after joining Pinoy Big Brother: All In, where she finished as the runner-up. Afterward, Racal signed with Star Magic. She was previously a member of It's Showtime's all-girl dance group Girltrends and ASAP's sing-and-dance group BFF5.

Racal's breakthrough role was as Irene Tiu in the ABS-CBN romantic drama series Can't Buy Me Love.

== Early life ==
Mariestella Cañedo Racal was born on September 22, 1997, in Tagum, Davao del Norte, to Henry and Leony (née Cañedo) Racal. She is the fifth of six children. Racal grew up in Davao del Norte and graduated high school from St. Mary's College in Tagum. In school, she regularly sang the responsorial psalm and performed during Mass. She also uploaded cover songs on SoundCloud.

Racal pursued a degree in medical technology at Trinity University of Asia but discontinued her studies due to her busy schedule.

== Acting career ==
=== 2014–2022: Pinoy Big Brother and subsequent projects ===
After Pinoy Big Brother, Racal was launched as part of Star Magic Circle 2014 and had been quickly molded as a budding actress, starting off on the drama series Hawak Kamay, followed by more stints on several TV series including Maalaala Mo Kaya, Ipaglaban Mo!, Oh My G!, and Ningning, and on films like Halik sa Hangin, Just The Way You Are, and The Breakup Playlist. She also starred with Roberto "Fourth" Solomon Pagotan IV in the Dear MOR episode, the "Kate and Red Story". In April 2015, she released her first single "Tanong Mo Sa Bituin" as part of Star Record's compilation album "OPM Fresh". In June 2015, she played her first lead role in the film Stars Versus Me by Tandem Entertainment.

In February 2016, Racal was introduced as one of the members of all-girl dance group Girltrends on the noontime show It's Showtime, where was tagged as "Magnificent Girltrend Maris" and became the group's Team Young member. She also played a supporting role in the comedy-drama series We Will Survive. In October 2016, Racal performed in her first OneMusicPH's digital concert "Double Hearts", where she debuted her original song "Take It All Away". In the same month, she also appeared in the film The Third Party. In December 2016, Racal played the role of Maxine in the 2016 Metro Manila Film Festival box office entry film Vince and Kath and James.

In January 2017, Racal was launched as one of the members of ASAP's all-girl song-and-dance group BFF5 (pronounced as BFFs), alongside Loisa Andalio, Ylona Garcia, Andrea Brillantes, and Kira Balinger. Her inclusion in the new group led Racal to leave Girltrends. Later on, she made her guest appearance in the action drama series FPJ's Ang Probinsyano, and a starring role in Wansapanataym Presents: Annika PINTAsera. She also performed the song "Paano Mo Nalaman", a Tagalog version of "How Did You Know", for the romantic drama series Ikaw Lang Ang Iibigin. On July 8, 2017, Racal held her first major concert "4 of A Kind: The Un4gettable Concert" at the Music Museum, alongside Loisa Andalio, Sue Ramirez and Kristel Fulgar. She also starred in the horror-thriller film Bloody Crayons, drama series Hanggang Saan, and the 2017 Metro Manila Film Festival box office entry film Haunted Forest.

On February 8, 2018, Racal headlined the first Star Events FanCon at Teatrino, Promenade with Iñigo Pascual as her special guest. Her original song "Tala" was released as her newest single during the event. A few days later, she debuted as co-host for Iñigo Pascual's online show One Music POPSSSS, appearing on the first episode of the fourth season. Her latest single "Ikaw Lang Sapat Na" was released in May 2018, as part of the soundtrack of romantic drama series Since I Found You. In September 2018, she became a certified recording artist with the release of her first album entitled "Stellar". In October 2018, she was one of the ten interpreters for Himig Handog 2018 with a song entitled "Sugarol" composed by Jan Sabili. In 2019, Racal joined the cast of family drama series Pamilya Ko in the role of Peachy Mabunga. Pamilya Ko was later canceled in 2020, following the loss of ABS-CBN's franchise in the middle of COVID-19 pandemic.

Racal had to temporarily work on TV5 under its blocktimer shows. She was part of the short-lived program Sunday Noontime Live!, and played a lead role in the romantic comedy series Stay-In Love. She later made her appearance on The Big Night of Pinoy Big Brother: Connect in March 2021, and returned to ASAP in April 2021.

=== 2023–present: Breakthrough with Can't Buy Me Love ===
In 2023, Racal starred in the comedy thriller and Slamdance Film Festival entry Marupok AF (Where is the Lie?). She also appeared in the body-swapping comedy Here Comes the Groom. The film is an entry to the 1st Summer Metro Manila Film Festival and the sequel to the 2010 film Here Comes the Bride. She also led the series Simula sa Gitna opposite Khalil Ramos.

In the same year, Racal starred in the romantic drama series Can't Buy Me Love. She portrayed the role of Irene Tiu, a spoiled, alcoholic and sarcastic girl who has a rivalry with her half-sister Caroline Tiu, portrayed by Belle Mariano. Irene eventually develops a love-hate relationship with Snoop Manansala. Racal gained mainstream recognition for her role.

In 2024, Racal headlined the 49th Toronto International Film Festival entry Sunshine, directed by Antoinette Jadaone. A sports drama film, she did one year of gymnastics training for the titular role. She also appeared in the Metro Manila Film Festival entry And the Breadwinner Is..., led by Vice Ganda and directed by Jun Lana.

In 2025, Racal starred in the Netflix romantic comedy film Sosyal Climbers with Anthony Jennings. She also appeared in the action drama series Incognito. Racal then starred in the long-running Coco Martin-led series FPJ’s Batang Quiapo.

== Music career ==
In July 2014, Racal and the Pinoy Big Brother: All In housemates released their own original album, composed of three songs ("Teen Love Song", "Turtle Song", and "Bibimbap") originally written and sung by themselves.

On October 28, 2014, she uploaded her cover of Ed Sheeran's "Thinking Out Loud" song on her official YouTube account. The hashtag 'Thinking Out Loud Cover by Maris Racal' immediately trended worldwide on Twitter, as her fans expressed their delight for her cover song. The video garnered almost two million hits on YouTube since it was uploaded.

In February–March 2015, Racal shared her video blogs on YouTube known as "Maris My Song For You" episodes (with the direction of Alco Guerrero) where she gave her fans an opportunity to send her their messages and ask her to breathe new life to their favorite song. Her videos featured covers of songs "In My Life" and "True Colors", followed by "Firework", "Yellow", "Lost Stars", "'Til There Was You" and "Ordinary People".

In April 2015, Racal released her first single "Tanong Mo Sa Bituin", as part of Star Record's compilation album "OPM Fresh". The song became the official soundtrack for the film Stars Versus Me.

In August 2015, Racal covered Norah Jones' hit song "Don't Know Why" during the #HappyBirthdayWish1075 celebration. Her exclusive performance made her won the awards "Wishers’ Choice for Wishclusive Performance of the Year" and "Wishers’ Choice for Young Artist of the Year" in the 2016 Wish 107.5 Music Awards, held at the Smart Araneta Coliseum on January 26, 2016.

On October 2, 2016, Racal was one of the four singer-performers (alongside Loisa Andalio, Sue Ramirez, and Kristel Fulgar) who headlined OneMusicPH's Double Hearts Digital Concert where she debuted her original song "Take It All Away".

During the grand press conference for the drama series Ikaw Lang ang Iibigin on April 24, 2017, Racal performed the song "Paano Mo Nalaman", a Tagalog version of "How Did You Know", and one of the soundtracks for the series, which premiered on May 1, 2017.

On February 8, 2018, Racal released her song "Tala" during her FanCon. On May 4, 2018, she also released her single "Ikaw Lang Sapat Na", a song that she wrote for Iñigo Pascual on their guesting on the Sunday night talk show Gandang Gabi, Vice!. "Ikaw Lang Sapat Na" was used as a soundtrack for the romantic drama series Since I Found You. The song was also featured on ASAP with Iñigo Pascual. On July 7, 2018, Racal launched her first album "Stellar" at the SM North Edsa Skydome, with Migz Haleco, Iñigo Pascual and Sue Ramirez as her special guests. She performed all of her songs in the album, including "Hi Crush", "Love Is Easy", "Tayo Na Di Tayo", "Ikaw Lang Sapat Na" and a rock version of "Tala". Her album is available in all digital stores nationwide. In October 2018, she interpreted the official entry from the Himig Handog 2018, "Sugarol", written by Jan Sabili.

On the second quarter of 2019, Racal released her self-written single "Abot Langit", in collaboration with Rico Blanco.

In 2020, Racal signed with a new music label, Balcony Entertainment and distributor, Sony Music Philippines. She released her first single "Not For Me" in September under the new label.

On June 11, 2022, Racal released her sophomore album Ate Sandali, composed of eight tracks, including her lead single of the same title. Some of her songs, including "Asa Naman" from the album, feature Cebuano lyrics. "It's always going to be a part of me to incorporate Bisaya words into my music," Racal said in an interview with Mae Trumata of Nylon Manila. The song won "Best Regional Recording" at the 35th Awit Awards in 2022. Racal delivered her acceptance speech partly in Cebuano. She stated, "We all know that when we write songs, we should write our truth, and part of my truth is that I'm born in Tagum, Davao. I grew up Bisaya!" She encouraged other musicians to write songs in Philippine languages beyond Tagalog.

== Personal life ==
Racal dated actor-singer Iñigo Pascual during their time as onscreen partners, but their partnership "didn't work out" and they remained as friends. After their split, Racal was linked to musician Rico Blanco from 2019 to 2024, after meeting at a friend's wedding. They announced their relationship in July 2021. Racal and Blanco later broke up in July 2024.

Besides her entertainment career, Racal also ventured into entrepreneurship and launched a prominent coffee shop on a popular beach in San Juan, La Union, called "Stream of Consciousness Coffee".

On September 21, 2025, Racal joined the 2025 Philippine anti-corruption protests in Manila. She also marched with the Philippine-Palestine Friendship Association.

== Filmography ==
=== Film ===
Year	Title	Role	Notes	Ref.
2015	Halik sa Hangin	Tetay	Supporting role	
2015	Stars Versus Me	Elena		
2015	Just the Way You Are	Amy		
2015	The Breakup Playlist	Janine		
2016	The Third Party	Joan		
2016	Vince and Kath and James	Maxine	Supporting role, 42nd Metro Manila Film Festival entry	
2017	Bloody Crayons	Richalaine Alcantara	Main role	
2017	Haunted Forest	Mich	43rd Metro Manila Film Festival entry	
2019	I'm Ellenya L.	Ellenya	3rd Pista ng Pelikulang Pilipino entry	
2020	Block Z	Erika		
2020	Boyette: Not a Girl Yet	Nancy	Supporting role	
2020	Isa Pang Bahaghari	Young Lumen	Supporting role, 46th Metro Manila Film Festival entry	
2023	Here Comes the Groom	Blesilda	Supporting role, 1st Summer Metro Manila Film Festival entry	
2023	Marupok AF (Where Is The Lie?)	Beanie Landridos	Main role, Slamdance Film Festival entry	
2024	Sunshine	Sunshine Francisco	Main role, 49th Toronto International Film Festival entry	
2024	And the Breadwinner Is...	Buneng	Supporting role, 50th Metro Manila Film Festival entry	
2025	Sosyal Climbers	Jessa Baluarte / Penelope Regalado	Main role	

=== Television / Digital ===
Year	Title	Role	Notes/Ref.
2014	Pinoy Big Brother: All In	Housemate / 2nd Big placer	
2014	Hawak Kamay	Wendy	
2014	Maalaala Mo Kaya: Lobo	Maila	
2015	Oh My G!	Junalyn Barel	
2015	Ipaglaban Mo!: Inabusong Karapatan	Nina	
2015	Ipaglaban Mo!: Pinekeng Anyo	Minnie	
2015	Maalaala Mo Kaya: Bottled Water	Zyra	
2015	Ipaglaban Mo!: Maging Akin Ka Lang	Jenny / Jean's Sister	
2015–2020; 2021–present	ASAP	Herself (performer) / BFF5 member	
2015–2016	Ningning	Niña Buenaflor	Supporting role
2016	We Will Survive	Jenny Bonanza / Jennilyn	
2016	Maalaala Mo Kaya: Droga	young Emily / Emilia Rodrigo	Special participation
2016	Maalaala Mo Kaya: Toga	Analyn Telmo / Analiyn Telmo	
2016	Home Sweetie Home: Something New	Letlet	
2016	Maalaala Mo Kaya: Luneta Park	Maymay	
2016–2017	It's Showtime	Herself / GirlTrends member	
2017	FPJ's Ang Probinsyano	Ronalyn "Rona" Carreon	
2017	Ipaglaban Mo!: Katotohanan	Jessa	
2017	Wansapanataym: Annika PINTAsera	Fairy Sylvia	
2017	Maalaala Mo Kaya: Tape Recorder	Lou Ann	
2017	Mellow Myx	Herself / Myx Celebrity VJ	
2017	My Myx	Herself / Myx Celebrity VJ	
2017	Pinoy Myx	Herself / Myx Celebrity VJ	
2017	Pop Myx	Herself / Myx Celebrity VJ	
2017	Maalaala Mo Kaya: Casa	Young Hazel	
2017–2018	Hanggang Saan	Nessa	
2018	Maalaala Mo Kaya: Ukelele	Tin Amistoso	
2018	Ipaglaban Mo: Kakampi	Maya Hermosa	
2019	Pamilya Ko	Peachy Ann R. Mabunga	
2019	Maalaala Mo Kaya: Stationery	Carol	
2019	Maalaala Mo Kaya: Contest	Zephanie Dimaranan	
2020	Beauty Queens	Tarsila Zamora Rodriguez	
2020–2021	Stay-In Love	Diding Saclolo	
2021	Maalaala Mo Kaya: Flyers	Jayren Lom-oc	
2021	Maalaala Mo Kaya: Bisikleta	Jayren Lom-oc	
2022	The Kangks Show	Cassandra	
2022	The Goodbye Girl	Ria	
2022	How to Move On in 30 Days	Jen Agbisit	
2022	Suntok sa Buwan	Trina "Tinay"	
2023	Simula sa Gitna	Sarah	
2023	Takeshi's Castle Philippines	Guest commentator	
2023–2024	Can't Buy Me Love	Irene Tiu	
2024	Bida Bida	Herself	
2025	Incognito	Gabriela "Gab" Rivera-Guerrero / Sparrow	
2025	Pinoy Big Brother: Celebrity Collab Edition	Houseguest	
2025	Rainbow Rumble	Contestant	
2025–2026	FPJ's Batang Quiapo	Paula "Ponggay" Garcia	Main Role / Protagonist

=== Television commercials ===
Year	Brand	Product / campaign
2018	Garnier	Garnier Micellar Water; 1 Step Lang
2019	Careline	#CarelineGang #CarelineRebelRemix
2021	Eskinol Naturals	
2021	Whisper	New Breathable Pad #HingaLangGirl
2022	Sunsilk	Best-ever Summer w/ Best-ever Sunsilk
2024	San Miguel Flavored Beer	Life Refreshingly Sweeeet
2024	Efficasent Oil	Efficasent Boost Pain Relief Massage Roll-on
2024	Sting Energy Drink	Sting Hataw Mode
2024	Lay's Stax	#LoveSTAX
2024	Mang Inasal	Mang Inasal Pork BBQ
2024	San Mig Coffee	San Mig Sugar Free Coffee

== Discography ==
=== Studio albums ===
Year	Album	Label
2018	Stellar	Star Music
2022	Ate Sandali	Sony Music Philippines

=== Singles ===
Year	Song title	Album	Composer	Company
2015	Tanong Mo Sa Bituin	OPM Fresh	Joven Tan	Star Music
2018	Tala	Stellar	Maris Racal	Star Music
2018	Ikaw Lang Sapat Na	Stellar	Maris Racal	Star Music
2018	Love Is Easy	Stellar	Maris Racal	Star Music
2018	Tayo Na 'Di Tayo with Inigo Pascual	Stellar	Maris Racal	Star Music
2018	Hi Crush	Stellar	Gabriel Tagadtad	Star Music
2018	Tayo Na 'Di Tayo with Inigo Pascual (alternative version)	Stellar	Maris Racal	Star Music
2018	Sugarol	Himig Handog 2018	Jan Sabili	Star Music
2019	Abot Langit	-	Maris Racal	Star Music
2020	Not For Me	-	Maris Racal	Sony Music Philippines
2020	Kahit Na Anong Sablay	-	Maris Racal	Balcony Entertainment
2021	Stop Missing You	OPM Fresh: Songwriters Series Vol. 1	Mycah Alice Borja	Star Music
2021	Ate Sandali!	Ate Sandali	Maris Racal	Balcony Entertainment; Sony Music Philippines
2021	Asa Naman	Ate Sandali	Maris Racal	Balcony Entertainment; Sony Music Philippines
2021	Simulan (Starting Now)	-	Darren Criss, Jason Mater, Jordan Powers	Walt Disney Records
2022	Pumila Ka	Ate Sandali	Maris Racal	Balcony Entertainment; Sony Music Philippines
2022	Di Papakawalan	Ate Sandali	Maris Racal	Balcony Entertainment; Sony Music Philippines
2025	Perpektong Tao		Maris Racal	Nine Degrees North Inc.
2026	Sino Ang Tanga	-	Maris Racal, David La Sol, Nour Hooshmand	Nine Degrees North Inc.

=== Chart performance ===
Year	Title	Peak (iTunes PH Top 100)	Peak (MOR 101.9 Daily Pinoy Biga10)	Peak (MOR 101.9 Dyis Is It)	Peak (Spotify Philippines Viral 50)	Album
2018	"Tala"	1	1	-	4	Stellar
2018	"Ikaw Lang Sapat Na"	1	1	-	45	Stellar
2018	"Love Is Easy"	10	-	1	30	Stellar
2018	"Sugarol"	8	-	1	-	Himig Handog 2018
2019	"Tayo Na 'Di Tayo" with Inigo Pascual	4	-	2	-	Stellar
2019	"Abot Langit"	7	-	5	-	-

=== Music video chart performance ===
Year	Title	Peak (Myx Daily Top 10: Pinoy)	Peak (Pinoy Myx Countdown)	Peak (Myx Hit Chart)	Album
2018	"Love Is Easy"	1	2	2	Stellar
2018	"Sugarol"	1	1	1	Himig Handog 2018
2019	"Abot Langit"	3	1	3	-

== Awards and nominations ==
Year	Award-giving Body / Critics	Award	Notable Work	Result	Ref.
2014	1st Star Cinema Awards	Most Promising Actress	—N/a	Won	
2015	29th PMPC Star Awards for Television	Best New Female TV Personality	Maalaala Mo Kaya Ep.Lobo	Nominated	
2015	2nd Star Cinema Awards	Breakthrough Artist	—N/a	Won	
2016	Wish 107.5 Music Awards 2016	Wishers’ Choice for Wish Young Artist of the Year	—N/a	Won	
2016	Wish 107.5 Music Awards 2016	Wishers’ Choice for Best WISHclusive Performance	Don't Know Why	Won	
2016	29th Global Excellence Awards	People's Choice for Female Dance Group (Girltrends)	—N/a	Won	
2016	Push Awards	Push Play Newcomer	—N/a	Nominated	
2016	3rd Star Cinema Awards	#BestInLevelUp Breakthrough Star	—N/a	Won	
2017	Push Awards	#OOTDGoals Celebrity Fashionista of the Year	—N/a	Nominated	
2017	3rd LionhearTV RAWR Awards	Beshie ng Taon	Vince and Kath and James	Won	
2017	4th Star Cinema Awards	Ultimate Scene Stealer	Vince and Kath and James and Bloody Crayons	Won	
2017	4th Star Cinema Awards	Ultimate Breakthrough Loveteam (with Inigo Pascual)	—N/a	Won	
2018	20th Gawad Pasado Awards	PinakaPASADOng Dangal ng Kabataan (with Iñigo Pascual)	—N/a	Won	
2018	Myx Music Awards 2018	Myx Celebrity VJ of the Year	—N/a	Nominated	
2018	MOR Pinoy Music Awards 2018	Best New Artist of the Year	—N/a	Won	
2018	8th EdukCircle Awards	BEST ACTRESS in Single Drama Performance	Maalaala Mo Kaya Ep.Casa	Nominated	
2018	Himig Handog 2018	MOR Philippines Choice Award	Sugarol	Won	
2018	Himig Handog 2018	TFC's Global Choice for Favorite Song	Sugarol	Won	
2018	Himig Handog 2018	Myx Choice for Best Music Video	Sugarol	Won	
2018	Push Awards	Push Group/Tandem of the Year (with Inigo Pascual)	—N/a	Nominated	
2018	Push Awards	Push Celebrity Squad of the Year #Friendshipgoals (with Sue Ramirez)	—N/a	Nominated	
2018	Inside Showbiz Awards 2018	Favorite Music Video	Love Is Easy	Nominated	
2019	Wish 107.5 Music Awards 2019	Wish Pop Song of the Year	Love Is Easy	Nominated	
2019	Myx Music Awards 2019	Music Video Guest Appearance of the Year	Lumang Tugtugin by Inigo Pascual	Won	
2019	MOR Pinoy Music Awards 2019	Female Artist of the Year	Love Is Easy	Nominated	
2019	MOR Pinoy Music Awards 2019	Best Collaboration of the Year	Tayo Na Di Tayo (with Inigo Pascual)	Nominated	
2019	32nd Awit Awards 2019	PEOPLE'S CHOICE AWARD for Favorite New Female Artist	—N/a	Won	
2019	32nd Awit Awards 2019	PEOPLE'S CHOICE AWARD for Favorite Music Video	Sugarol	Won	
2019	32nd Awit Awards 2019	PERFORMANCE AWARD for Best Performance by a New Female Recording Artist	Love Is Easy	Nominated	
2019	32nd Awit Awards 2019	TECHNICAL AWARD for Best Vocal Arrangement	Sugarol	Nominated	
2019	32nd Awit Awards 2019	ALBUM PACKAGING EXCELLENCE AWARD for Best Cover Art	Stellar	Nominated	
2019	32nd Awit Awards 2019	Music Video of the Year	Sugarol	Nominated	
2020	GMMSF 51st Box Office Choice Awards	Promising Female Recording Artist of the Year	—N/a	Won	
2020	Laguna Excellence Award	Outstanding New Female Recording Artist of the Year	Hi Crush	Won	
2022	35th Awit Awards 2022	Female Favorite Artist	—N/a	Nominated	
2022	35th Awit Awards 2022	Best Regional Recording	Asa Naman	Won	
2023	The Platinum Stallion National Media Awards 2023	Best Media Practitioner for Entertainment	—N/a	Won	
2023	2023 Summer Metro Manila Film Festival	Best Supporting Actress	Here Comes the Groom	Nominated	
2023	TikTok Awards PH 2023	Celebrity Creator of the Year	—N/a	Nominated	
2023	36th Awit Awards 2023	Best World Music Recording	Pumila Ka	Nominated	
2023	4th TAG Media Chicago Awards	#TAG25UNDER25	—N/a	Rank 12	
2024	9th Wish Music Awards	Wishclusive Pop Performance of the Year	Ate Sandali	Nominated	
2024	9th Push Awards	Favorite Onscreen Performance for Television	Can't Buy Me Love	Won	
2024	5th Village Pipol Choice Awards	Breakthrough Star of the Year	Can't Buy Me Love	Won	
2024	Golden Laurel Awards	Breakthrough Love Team (with Anthony Jennings)	SnoRene - Can't Buy Me Love	Won	
2024	Anak TV Seal Awards	Net Makabata Star	—N/a	Nominated	
2024	Star Magical Christmas	Breakthrough Love Team of the Year (with Anthony Jennings)	—N/a	Won	
2025	TAG Victorious Awards Chicago	Best Supporting Actress - Series	Can't Buy Me Love	Won (Silver Champion)	
2025	6th Village Pipol Choice Awards	Supporting Movie Actress of the Year	And the Breadwinner Is...	Nominated	
2025	53rd Box Office Entertainment Awards	Most Promising Love Team of Philippine Entertainment (with Anthony Jennings)	—N/a	Won	
2026	8th Gawad Lasallianeta	Most Outstanding Actress in a Supporting Role	Incognito	Won	
2026	Laurus Nobilis Media Excellence Awards 2026	Media Excellence in Film Acting	Sunshine	Nominated	
2026	Manila Bulletin	Newsmaker of the Year	Sunshine	Won	
2026	6th Pinoy Rebyu Awards	Best Lead Performance	Sunshine	Won	
2026	9th Eddy's Awards	Best Actress	Sunshine	Won	
2026	49th Gawad Urian Award	Best Actress	Sunshine	Won	
2026	74th FAMAS Award	Best Actress	Sunshine	Nominated	
2026	74th FAMAS Award	FAMAS Actress of Distinction Award	Sunshine	Won	
2026	28th Gawad PASADO	PinakaPASADONG Aktres	Sunshine	Won	
2026	42nd PMPC Star Awards for Movies	Movie Actress of the Year	Sunshine	Won	
2026	Philippine Academy of Film and Television Arts	Breakthrough Performance Award	Batang Quiapo	Won	
