= Bloody Crayons =

- Theatrical release poster
- Directed by: Topel Lee
- Written by: Enrico C. Santos; Carmel Josine Jacomille; RJ Panahon; Justine Reyes de Jesus; Kenneth Lim Dagatan; John Paul Abellera
- Based on: Bloody Crayons by Josh Argonza
- Produced by: Charo Santos-Concio; Malou N. Santos
- Starring: Janella Salvador; Elmo Magalona; Empoy Marquez; Jane Oineza; Diego Loyzaga; Sofia Andres; Ronnie Alonte; Maris Racal; Yves Flores
- Cinematography: Topel Lee
- Edited by: Beng Bandong
- Music by: Francis Concio
- Production company: Star Cinema
- Distributed by: Star Cinema
- Release date: July 12, 2017
- Country: Philippines
- Language: Filipino
- Box office: ₱35 million

Bloody Crayons is a 2017 Filipino slasher film based on the book of the same name by Wattpad writer Josh Argonza. Directed by Topel Lee, the film features an ensemble cast including Janella Salvador, Jane Oineza, Maris Racal, Ronnie Alonte, Sofia Andres, Diego Loyzaga, Yves Flores, Empoy Marquez, and Elmo Magalona.

Development began in April 2015 when Star Cinema picked up the film rights of the book, originally billed by Jane Oineza, Joshua Garcia and Manolo Pedrosa. It was announced to be released in 2016 but undergone numerous recasting as well as the departure of the film's initial director Quark Henares, and production was pushed back beyond the said release date. A final cast was teased on the social media site Twitter late December 2016 but a change was again made early February 2017 replacing Julia Barretto and Joshua Garcia, with Janella Salvador and Elmo Magalona. Production has pushed through and was released on July 12, 2017.

== Plot ==
Nine graduating students travel to a remote island to shoot a short film for their final school project. The group includes timid Eunice; her best friend Olivia; Olivia’s boyfriend Kenly; Kenly’s best friend Justin; party-girl Richalaine; classy Marie; jokester Gerard; shy photographer Kiko, who admires Eunice; and newcomer John, who also likes her. They stay at Olivia’s parents’ summer home, where they meet Mang Pedring, the eerie caretaker.

Tensions arise when Olivia discovers Kenly has been cheating on her with Marie; and Eunice knew but stayed silent. After a heated confrontation, Olivia forgives the group the next day, and they begin filming. A storm interrupts the shoot, and that night, they play a game called "Bloody Crayons," a twisted version of truth or dare involving a box of colored crayons, each representing a challenge or consequence. Red crayons involve mixing a drink the last drawer must consume.

As the game escalates, Olivia draws a blue crayon and reveals she slept with Kenly, reigniting conflict. Marie draws the final red crayon and drinks the mixture, but she suddenly vomits blood and dies. Panic spreads. Olivia runs, and Kenly chases her. Olivia falls off a cliff to her apparent death, and suspicion turns on Kenly. Kiko and John tie him up. Later, they find Kenly murdered, his throat slit. Justin grabs a gun, accusing others. A fight breaks out, and Gerard is accidentally shot. Richalaine grabs the gun and flees upstairs. Justin corners her but slips and knocks himself out. Eunice finds her friends as John disappears into the woods.

Gerard dies from his wound. Richalaine and Eunice are later chased by someone in costume. They escape but Justin, now deranged, attacks them with a knife. In the struggle, he and Richalaine fall down the stairs and die. Eunice and Kiko reunite and encounter John, who claims to have found a boat. Kiko becomes suspicious after learning John has Mang Pedring’s keys. John says the caretaker died in a trap. They fight, and John falls into a pit but survives and discovers it leads to the cliff where Olivia fell; yet her body is gone.

Reaching the shore, the duo finds a boat, but Olivia’s voice comes over Eunice’s walkie-talkie. They return to the house and find her alive. Kiko grows suspicious; Olivia appears unharmed. He tries to warn Eunice but is stabbed by Olivia, revealing she orchestrated the deaths. Olivia hunts Eunice through the woods, ultimately cornering her at the cliff. Olivia confesses she planned to kill only Kenly, Marie, and Eunice but claims the others' deaths were not her fault. The two fight. Just as Olivia is about to kill Eunice, John’s drone crashes into her, knocking her off balance. Eunice tries to save her, but Olivia lets go and falls to her death.

John, alive thanks to a bullet-stopping dog tag, helps Eunice. They hear Kiko’s weak voice on the walkie-talkie and escape the island together by boat.

== Cast ==
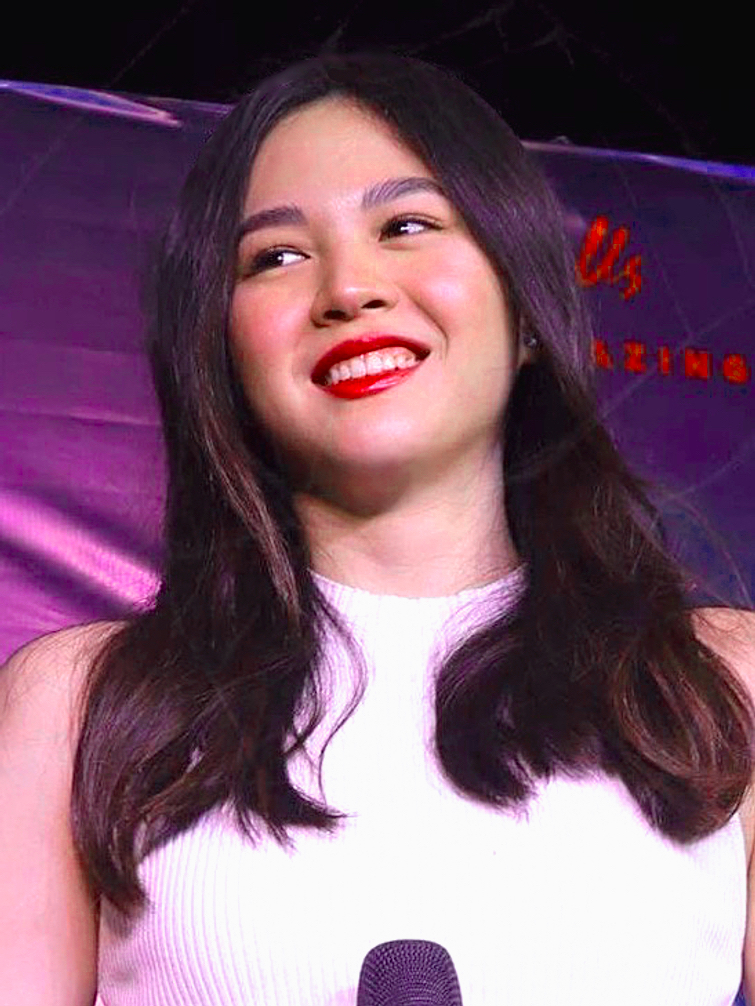
Janella Salvador
as Eunice Nicolas

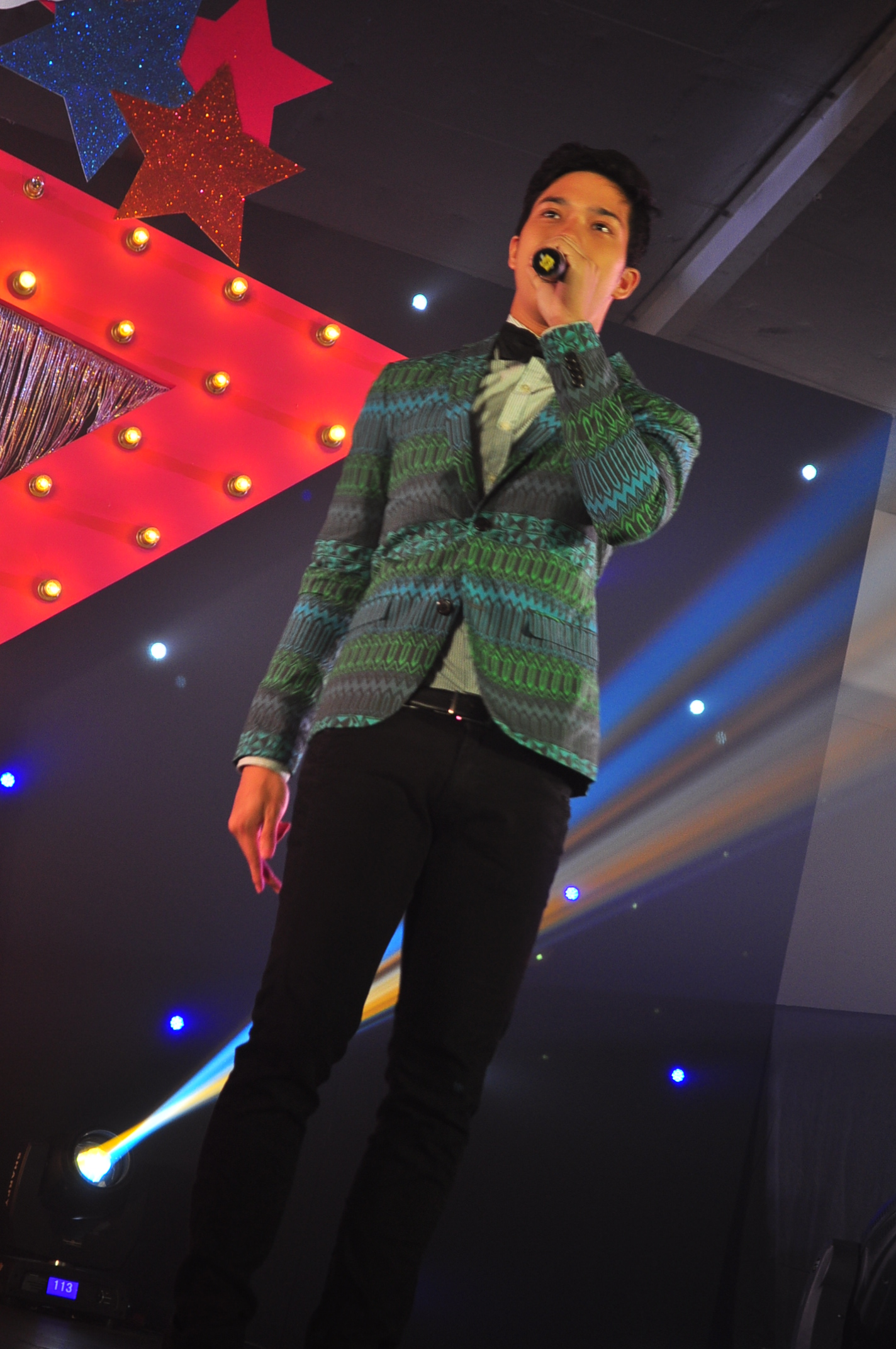
Elmo Magalona
as Kiko Rivera

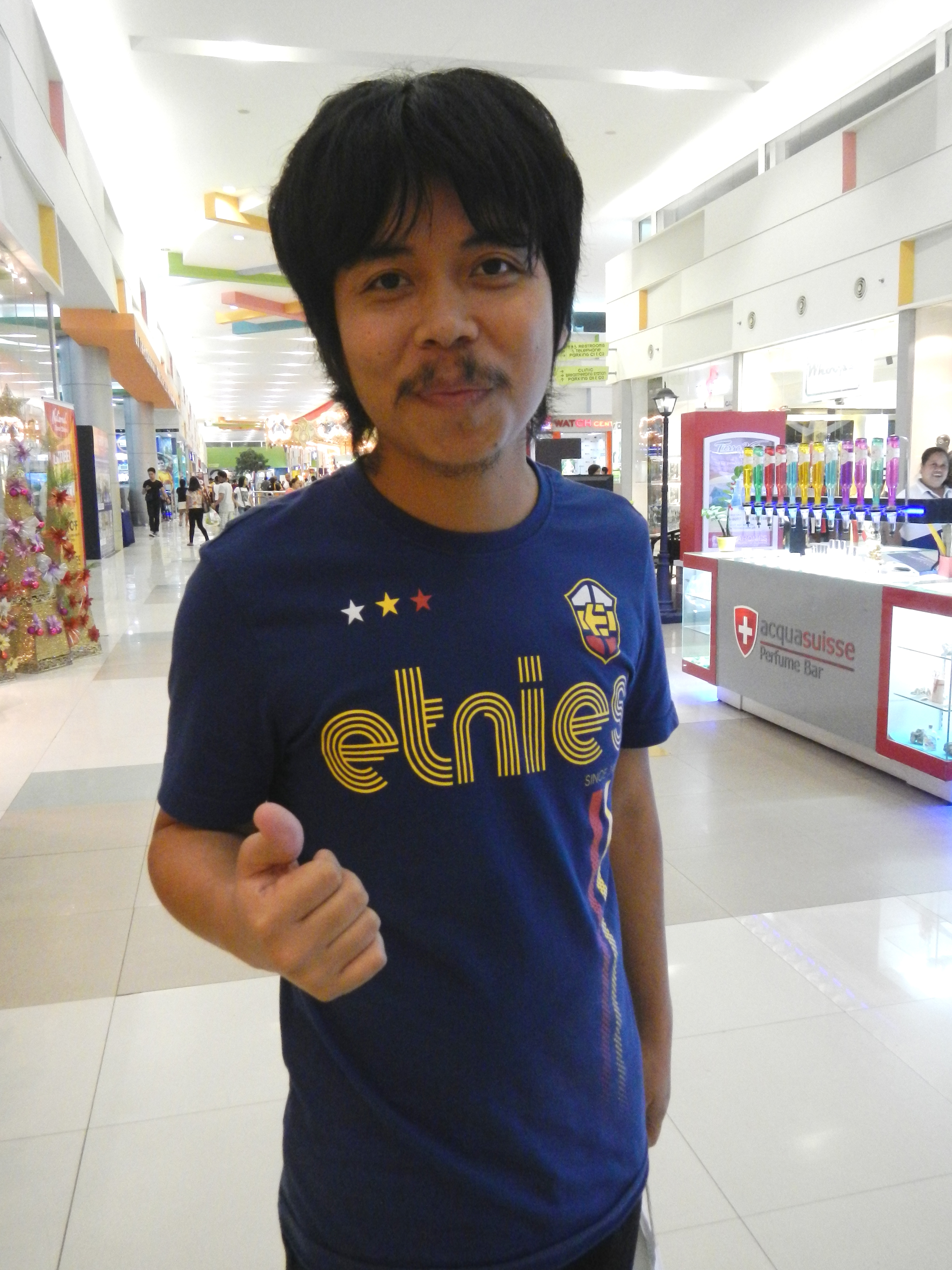
Empoy Marquez
as Gerard Anderson

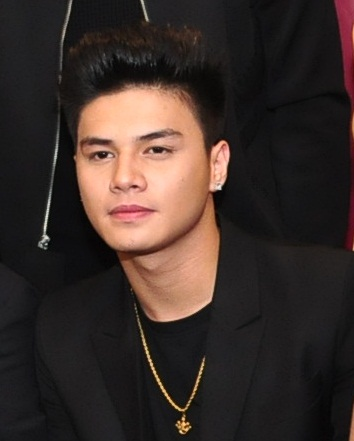
Ronnie Alonte
as John Jose Abrillo

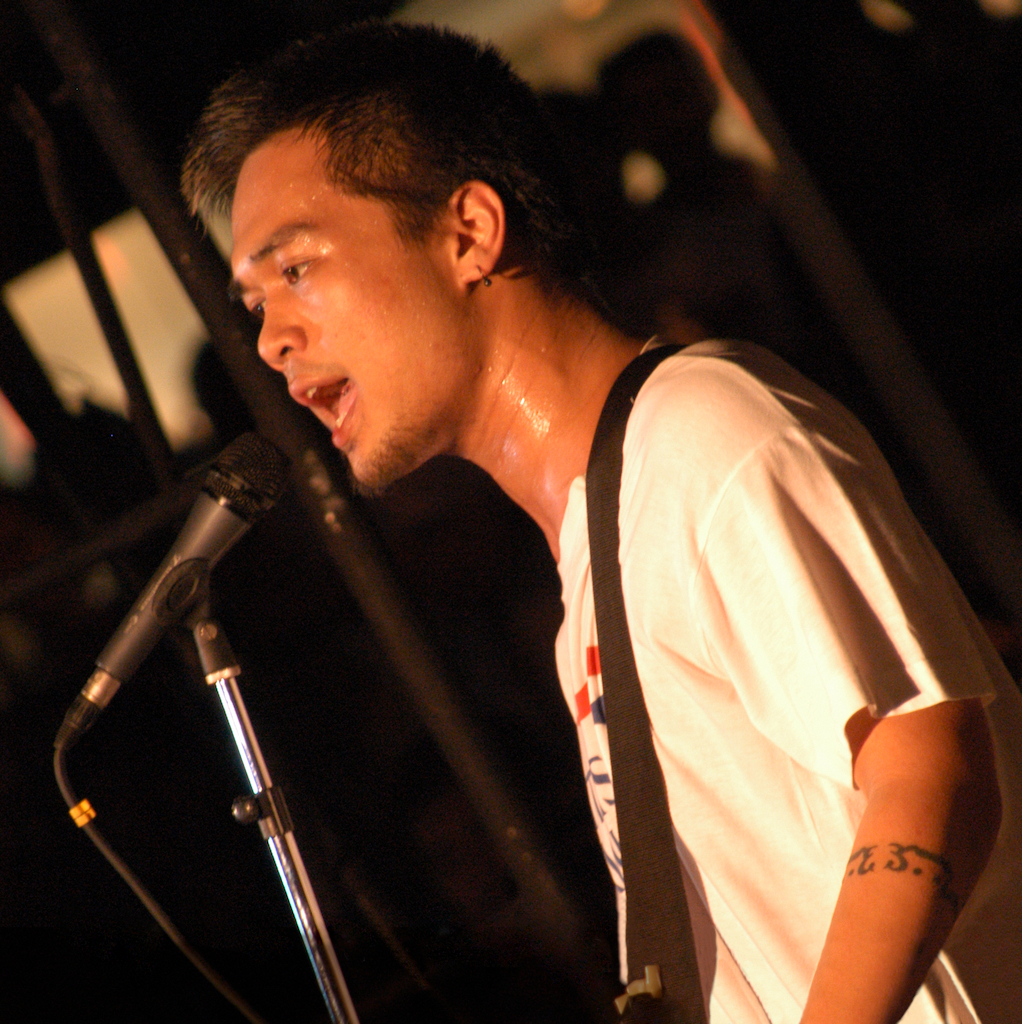
Marc Abaya
as Paolo Abrillo

Main cast

- Janella Salvador as Eunice Nicolas
- Elmo Magalona as Kiko Rivera
  - Lance Lucido as young Kiko
- Jane Oineza as Olivia "Liv" Mendez
- Ronnie Alonte as John Jose Abrillo

Supporting cast

- Empoy Marquez as Gerard Anderson
- Maris Racal as Richalaine "Rich" Alcantara
- Sofia Andres as Marie Ragma
- Diego Loyzaga as Kenly Sy
- Yves Flores as Justin Ybanez
- Nanding Josef as Pedring Mendez

Guest cast

- Marc Abaya as Paolo Abrillo
- Sarah Abad as Benilda Nicolas

== Production ==
Development began in April 2015, when Star Cinema picked up the film rights of the book. Not long after Jane Oineza, Manolo Pedrosa and Joshua Garcia were announced to be starring in the film adaptation. Quark Henares was hired to direct the film along with Earl Ignacio as assistant director. Quark Henares has been working on the script for the movie for almost a year before the announcement of his involvement with the project. On February 12, 2016, a final cast was revealed during the script reading for the film which was attended by Julia Barretto, Maris Racal, Jane Oineza, Sofia Andres, Yves Flores, Diego Loyzaga, and Khalil Ramos. Joshua Garcia and Manolo Pedrosa has been dropped by this point. February 22, 2016, the cast had a look test for the film where they were joined by additional cast members Bailey May and Ylona Garcia. Iñigo Pascual announced via Twitter that he would also be joining the cast.

Production stopped after the departure of the director and no further news was announced. On December 21, 2016, a picture circulated on the social media site Twitter. It was the cast for the film with the exclusion of some, and the return of Joshua Garcia to the roster as well as the addition of Empoy Marquez and Ronnie Alonte. In February 2017 a new batch of photos were posted on Twitter. It was a look test for the film with Julia Barreto and Joshua Garcia replaced by Janella Salvador and Elmo Magalona.

=== Filming ===
On April 6, 2016, First day of filming for the movie started with the whole cast set-up on one of their locations. Some of the cast members also tweeted about their excitement for the first day of filming. Not soon after, the director, Quark Henares announced via Twitter that he has left the project. This eventually stopped the whole production and no further updates were announced. After being pushed back and other production and filming delays, principal photography for the film officially began on March 2, 2017.

== Reception ==
Milliscent Ong of ABS-CBN News praised the film's humor and performances of the ensemble cast, concluding that it is "ideal for those who are fond of watching movies related to psychological thriller, mystery and murder". Rappler's Oggs Cruz was lenient in his review; while he found the film's setup to be "admittedly a drag", he also said that "it is also the type of bad movie that is so committed to all its ludicrous and absurd elements that it becomes so wildly entertaining. (...) Bloody Crayons is a film so bad, it's good". Wanggo Gallaga of InterAksyon said that "Jane Oineza, who plays Olivia, the friend who owns the resthouse and who is pining for her ex, was one of the few who managed to push through from the uneven storytelling. Her character had the most demands and she didn’t buckle under that pressure and even delivered moments of brilliance."

== See also ==
- And Then There Were None
- Whodunnit
