= Sosyal Climbers =

Philippine romantic comedy film by JP Laxamana

- Official release poster
- Directed by: Jason Paul Laxamana
- Screenplay by: Jason Paul Laxamana; Jericho Aguado
- Story by: Patrick Valencia; Jericho Aguado; Jason Paul Laxamana
- Produced by: Jason Paul Laxamana; Katherine S. Labayen
- Starring: Maris Racal; Anthony Jennings
- Edited by: Mai Calapardo
- Music by: Ammie Ruth Suarez
- Production company: ABS-CBN Studios
- Distributed by: Netflix
- Release date: February 27, 2025
- Running time: 103 minutes
- Country: Philippines
- Languages: Tagalog; English

Sosyal Climbers is a 2025 Philippine romantic comedy film produced, written and directed by Jason Paul Laxamana. It stars Maris Racal and Anthony Jennings in their film debut as a love team.

The film released worldwide in Netflix on February 27, 2025, and it debuted at the number 1 spot on Netflix's top 10 movies in the Philippines.

== Synopsis ==
After being scammed, Jessa and Ray find themselves in huge debt. At first, the situation seems hopeless, but then they get the chance to get the money they need. Using false identities, the couple manage to gain a foothold in high society. Jessa and Ray's new lives seem close to the one they wanted, but their charade requires a lot of cunning and is always at risk of being exposed, while their morals and relationship are put to the test.

== Cast ==
- Maris Racal as Jessa Baluarte/Penelope Regalado
- Anthony Jennings as Ray Cruz/Kiefer Regalado
- Ricky Davao as Mr. Wendel Tecson
- Carmi Martin as Madeline Montecillo
- Bart Guingona as Fidel Montecillo
- Cheska Iñigo as Lavinia
- Marissa Sanchez as Elise
- Raquel Pareno as Ruby
- Pam Arambulo as Genevieve
- Shanaia Gomez as Carlotta
- Jan Silverio as Blue
- Star Orjaleza as Inday
- Raul Montesa as Boss Gil
- Esnyr Ranollo as Shey
- VJ Mendoza as Temyo

== Production ==
The project was first pitched by filmmaker Jason Paul Laxamana and ABS-CBN Studios to Netflix in late 2022. This is the first on-screen pairing of Racal and Jennings in a movie after both starring in the 2023 series Can't Buy Me Love.

== Release ==
The film was digitally released on Netflix on February 27, 2025. It is the first Netflix original film that is co-produced with ABS-CBN Studios.

== Reception ==
Butch Francisco of Daily Tribune wrote: "Lucky for Sosyal Climbers, it has the team-up of Anthony and Maris. From its No. 7 spot in Netflix, don’t expect this film to go up in rank anymore. It may just tumble down, down, down — until it is swept into the dustbin of forgettable Filipino movies." Iza Iglesias of The Manila Times found that, with this film, both lead actors "step[ped] into mature roles".

Riya Singh of Leisure Byte gave the film a rating of 3 out of 5 stars and she said;

While the film brings its share of love and laughter for the audience, the idealistic ending only adds to the finishing touches of this story. A good enough watch, but not something that is memorable.
