= Incognito (TV series) =

Philippine action drama television series

- Promotional poster
- Genre: Action; Drama; Soap opera
- Written by: Generiza Reyes-Francisco; Maan Dimaculangan-Fampulme; John David Cruz
- Directed by: Lester Pimentel Ong; Ian Loreños; Wang Yan Bin
- Starring: Richard Gutierrez; Baron Geisler; Maris Racal; Anthony Jennings; Kaila Estrada; Ian Veneracion; Daniel Padilla
- Music by: Jessie Lasaten
- Opening theme: "Liwanag sa Dilim" by Pablo of SB19
- Composer: Rico Blanco
- Country of origin: Philippines
- Original language: Filipino
- No. of episodes: 128

Production
- Executive producers: Carlo L. Katigbak; Cory V. Vidanes; Laurenti M. Dyogi
- Producers: Des de Guzman; Henry King Quitain; Jay Fernando; Sackey Prince Pendatun; Pamela Mendiola Quizon
- Production locations: El Nido, Palawan; Bari, Apulia; Baguio, Atok, Benguet; Yamagata, Japan (mid-season); Tacloban (mid-season); Marawi (finale)
- Editor: Kathryn Jerry Perez
- Camera setup: Single-camera
- Running time: 20–36 minutes
- Production companies: Star Creatives; Studio Three Sixty

Original release
- Network: Kapamilya Channel (Note: First released on Netflix and iWant that marketed as "advanced screening". It is currently airing on its primary network Kapamilya Channel as well as other blocktime channels and platforms.)
- Release: January 20 (Note: First made available for advanced streaming on Netflix from January 17 to July 15, 2025. Episodes are not released all-at-once. The premiere date for traditional television was from January 20 to July 18, 2025.) – July 18, 2025

Incognito is a Philippine action drama television series produced by Star Creatives and Studio Three Sixty. Directed by Lester Pimentel Ong, it stars a large ensemble cast topbilled by Richard Gutierrez, Baron Geisler, Maris Racal, Anthony Jennings, Kaila Estrada, Ian Veneracion and Daniel Padilla. The series was first made available on Netflix on January 17, 2025, before it premiered on Kapamilya Channel's Primetime Bida evening block from January 20 to July 18, 2025. A second season has been in development

== Premise ==
In search of redemption, a group of seven misfits joined a covert group which is a private military company that undertakes deadly missions targeting the criminal underworld that the government can't address directly, specifically focusing on human trafficking. The group is led by Gregorio "Greg" Paterno (Ian Veneracion),

Five of the crew, namely Jose "JB" Bonifacio (Richard Gutierrez), Miguel "Migs" Tecson (Baron Geisler), Macaria "Max" Alvero (Kaila Estrada), Gabriela "Gab" Rivera (Maris Racal), and Andres Malvar (Daniel Padilla), were all dishonorably discharged from military service, while Tomas "Tom" Guerrero (Anthony Jennings) didn't graduate from military academy because he was accused of stealing.

== Cast and characters ==
Cast

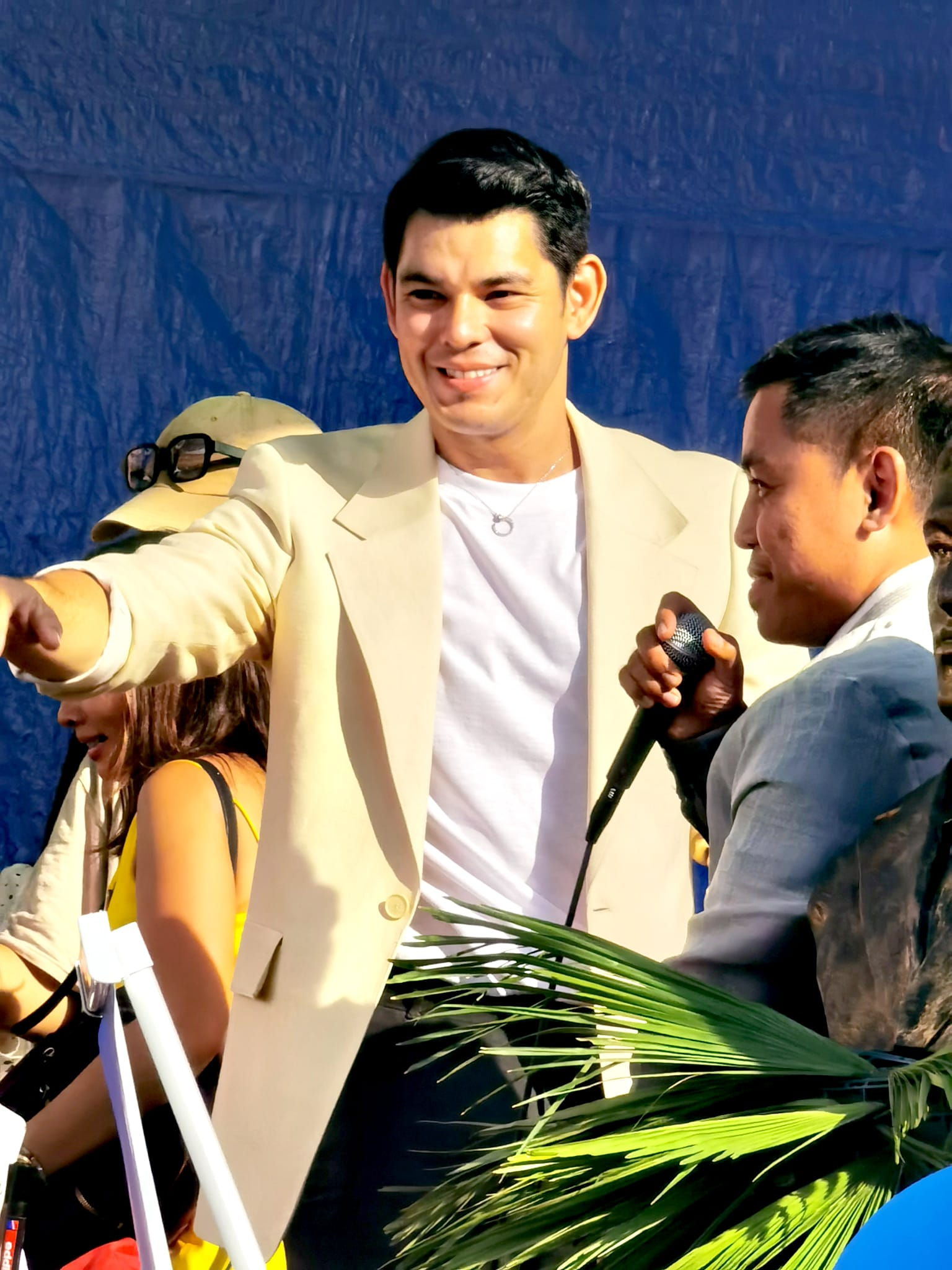
Richard Gutierrez

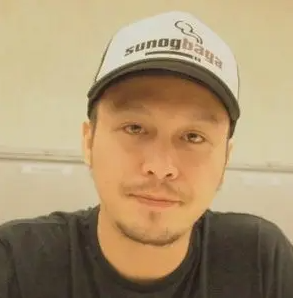
Baron Geisler

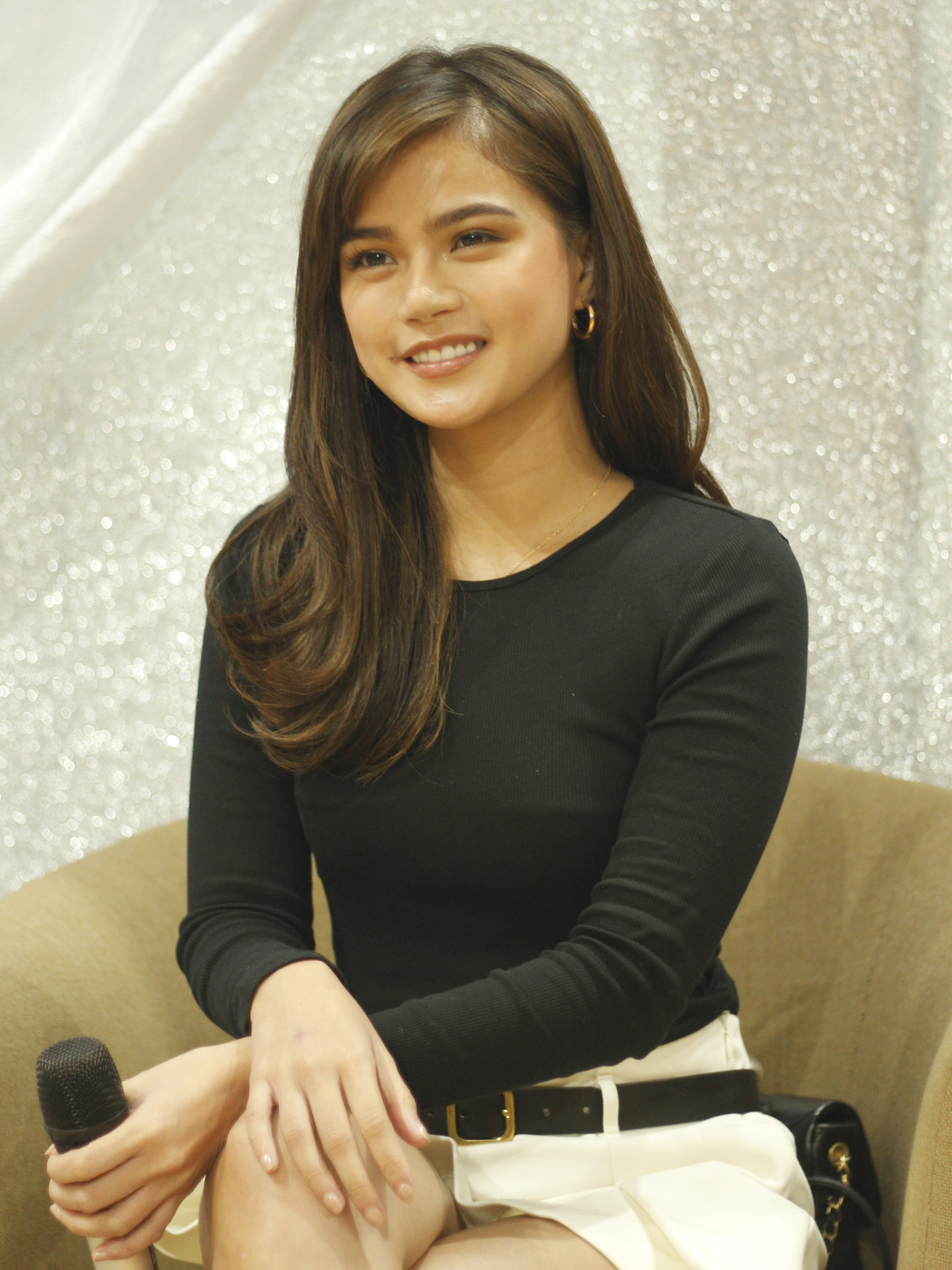
Maris Racal

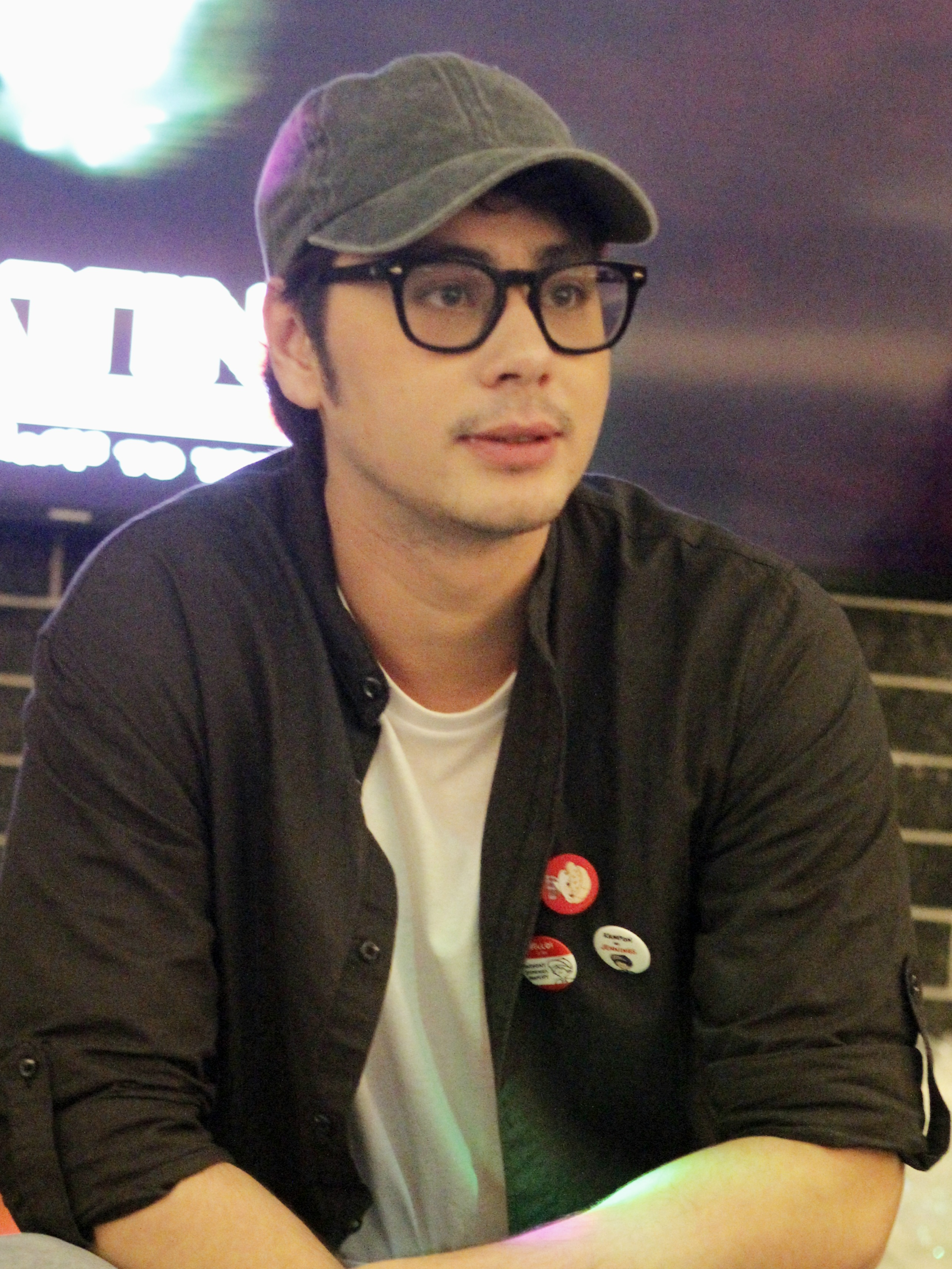
Anthony Jennings

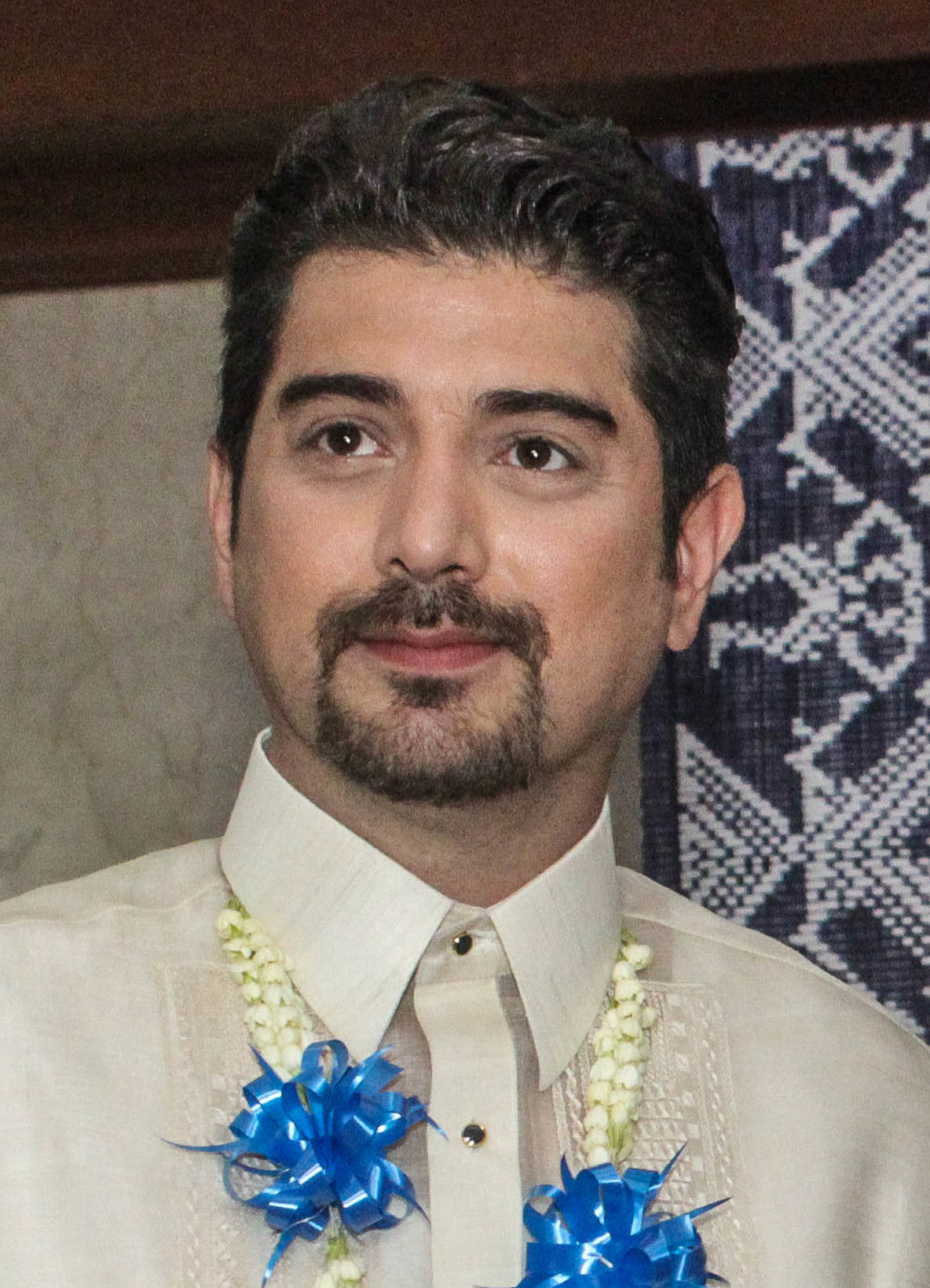
Ian Veneracion

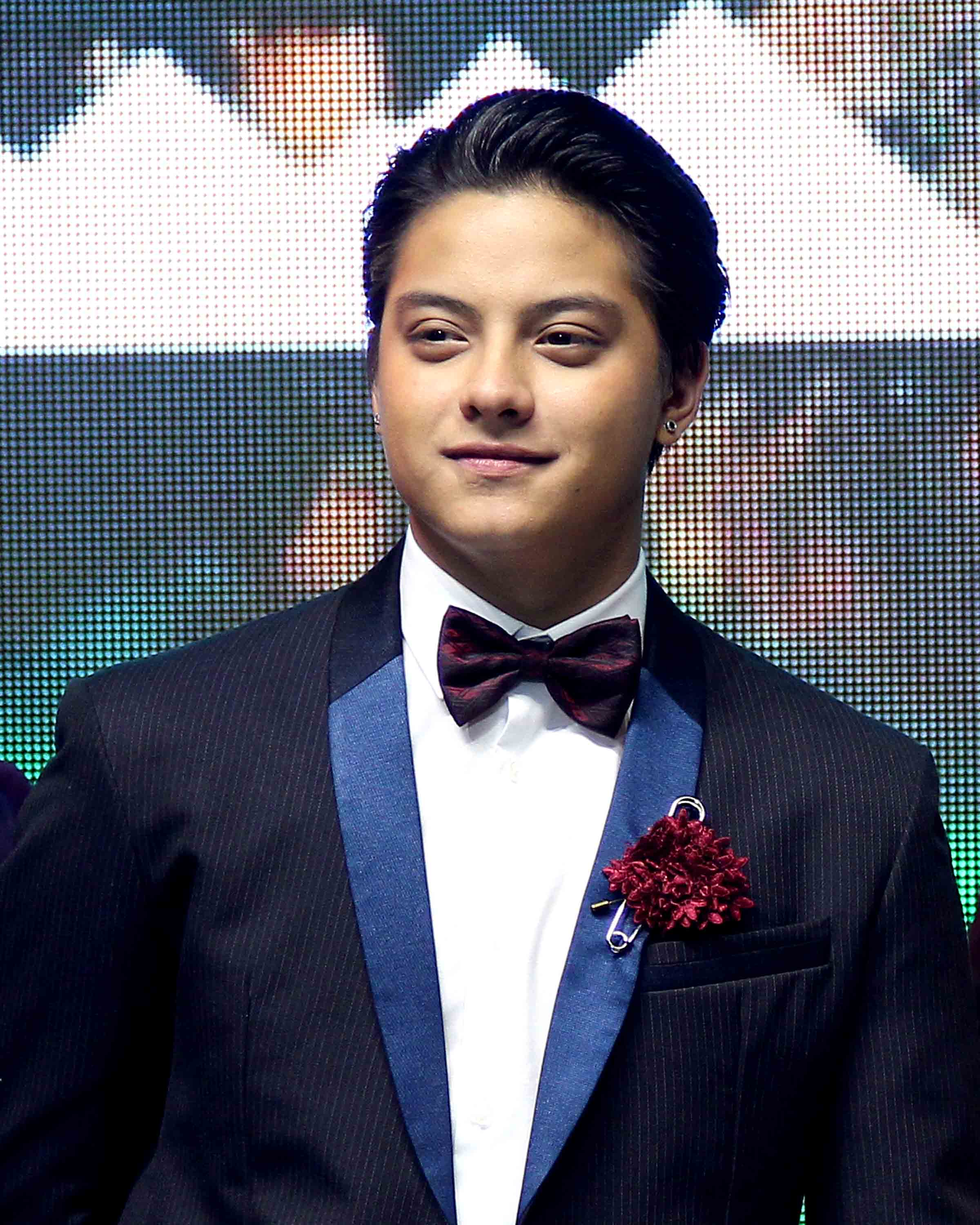
Daniel Padilla

Main Cast

- Richard Gutierrez as Jose "JB" Bonifacio / Shark
- Baron Geisler as Dr. Miguel "Migs" Tecson / Jaguar
- Maris Racal as Gabriela "Gab" Rivera-Guerrero / Sparrow
- Anthony Jennings as Tomas "Tom" Guerrero / Monkey
- Kaila Estrada as Macaria “Max” Alvero / Metamorphosis / Eagle
- Ian Veneracion as Col. Gregorio "Greg" Paterno / Contractor / Noah
- Daniel Padilla as Andres Malvar / Wolf

Supporting Cast

- Eddie Gutierrez as Gen. Antonio "Tony" Bonifacio
- Bembol Roco as Rolando "Ninong" Reyes
- Joel Torre as Philip Rivera
- Jestoni Alarcon as Gen. Donnie Novilla
- Agot Isidro as Isabel Escalera
- Malou de Guzman as Esang "Apo" Malvar
- Cris Villanueva as Pedro Malvar
- Noel Comia Jr. as Luis
- Ryan Eigenmann as Eugene Escalera / Clover
- Antonio Aquitania as Lorenzo
- Polo Ravales as Emilio "Emil" Manalastas
- Dino Imperial as Francis Escalera / Diamond
- Eric Tai as Bruno
- Louise Abuel as Francisco "Jun/Kiko" Malvar / Diego "Uno" Aguinaldo
- Ana Abad Santos as Teddy
- Sharmaine Suarez as Lorena
- Matt Evans as Baste Guerrero
- Emmanuelle Vera as Shari
- Ramon Christopher as General Arsenio Mariano
- Lance Pimentel as Kenjie Lee
- Joem Bascon as Manuel Aguinaldo / Raven

Recurring Cast

- Belle Mariano as Takako Rai
- Elijah Canlas as Donato Escalera / Spade
- Jane de Leon as Sylvia Escalera-Jayin / Heart
- Aljur Abrenica as Bhim Purma
- Raymond Bagatsing as Amb. Jigme Rai
- Art Acuña as Timor "Señor" Escalera
- Adrian Alandy as Jake Dela Cuesta
- Yesh Burce as Christine Paterno-Tecson / Christine Paterno-Dela Cuesta
- Lucas Andalio as Mickey P. Tecson / Mickey P. Dela Cuesta
- Noel Trinidad as Tomas' neighbor
- Tanya Gomez as Olga
- Alwyn Uytingco as a train aggressor
- Andi Abaya as a train passenger
- Paolo Gumabao as Ramon Destura
- Robert Seña as Rema "Ama" Muñoz
- Nova Villa as Sara
- Ariel Ureta as Abel
- Louise delos Reyes as Clara
- Alex Medina as Joel
- Mike Lloren as Senator Domingo "Domie" Lacosta
- Jong Cuenco as Col. Joaquin Locsin
- Ian de Leon as Brother Jerry
- Felix Roco as Brother Simon

Guest Cast

- Jana Agoncillo as Crystal
- Marc Santiago as Carl
- Miguel Vergara as Adam
- Rap Robles as hotel guest (Coach)
- Nicco Manalo as Tomas' neighbor
- Ynigo Delen as Rambo Tolentino
- Andrei Tiangco as Jay Escalera
- Ron Angeles as Tommy Caballero
- Victor Basa as Omar Justo
- Raffy Tejada as Manuel Bascon
- Jack Falcis as Kanor
- Morris Sevilla as Mico Caballero
- Robert Sanchez as Kulato
- Marife Necessito as Pusit
- Christina Simon as Nanette
- Tart Carlos as Yaya Madel
- Rommel Velasquez as Javier Bascon
- Masa Mentuda as Roda
- Jorel Ramirez as Arman
- Daniell Caraos as Jasmine
- Lala Magbuhat as Greg's informant
- Victor Silayan as Sevi
- Joyce Ann Burton as Marcela Bonifacio
- Bea Rose Santiago as Dra. Trina Gamboa, MD
- JC Galano as Vincent Bulatao
- Jay Gonzaga as CIB Agent Pagundayao
- Drey Lampago as Sebastian
- Ivan Carapiet as Raul
- Anna Luna as Rita
- Sheree Bautista as Claire
- Mitoy Yonting as Bokyo
- Junjun Quintana as Captain Santos
- Epi Quizon as Sameo Patel
- Jerald Napoles as Benjie Alcazar
- Joko Diaz as Enrique "Lion" Agno
- Christian Vasquez as "Giraffe"
- Zaijian Jaranilla as Emer
- Karl Medina as Amado
- Francis Mata as Kapitan
- Jameson Blake as Franco
- Mary Joy Apostol as Aira
- CJ Navato as Vince
- Mark Manicad as Edward
- Vonz Lopez as Jack
- Gardo Versoza as Monching Santiago
- Elyson de Dios as Enzo
- Aljon Mendoza as Marcelo Marquez
- Richard Quan as Gen. Dexter Tienza / Vincent
- Meryll Soriano as Secretary Josephine Ella Barrios
- Miggy Jimenez as Sais
- Vhong Navarro as Gaspar
- Lou Yanong as Kwatro
- Nikko Natividad as Lucio
- Althea Ruedas as Sandra
- Thou Reyes as Damien

== Episodes ==
No.	Title	Original air date (Note: iWant shows two episodes first in advance before it broadcasts on TV while Netflix shows three episodes in advance.)
1	"Job Order"	January 20, 2025
A bloody incident drives an army general to enlist the help of the only person who can prevent an impending diplomatic crisis in the country.
2	"Arrival"	January 21, 2025
Greg, the Contractor, gathers a team of skilled individuals for an important job. The team springs into action and begins their dangerous assignment.
3	"Common Ground"	January 22, 2025
Greg's team wastes no time in accomplishing their dangerous plan after receiving a 3-day ultimatum from the kidnapper of the ambassador's daughter.
4	"Complication"	January 23, 2025
Miguel fights the temptation in the Escalera mansion. Andres discovers a grim situation in the island. Heart senses something awkward with the guests.
5	"Purely Business"	January 24, 2025
After his informant's death, Greg immediately plans to abduct Donato. Andres defies his leader and rescues the victims of human trafficking.
6	"Shaken"	January 27, 2025
The mission fails when JB, Miguel, and Andres fall victim to a trap intended for the target. The team races against time to accomplish their job.
7	"Fetch"	January 28, 2025
The team infiltrates the enemy territory to get their target. But the Escalera's security gets alerted while the team heads out to their exit point.
8	"Run!"	January 29, 2025
An intense encounter occurs when the Escalera cousins attempt to rescue Donato. As they feel a definite victory, the team risks everything they have.
9	"Payment"	January 30, 2025
After receiving payment for their services, Andres, Tomas, Max, and JB will face their personal problems as they go back to their respective lives.
10	"Lights Out"	January 31, 2025
The team faces a major setback due to Donato's actions. As a result, the Contractor gives the team a new mission that they cannot refuse.
11	"Territory"	February 3, 2025
Timor appoints Clover to lead the organization in his absence. With Greg's promise, JB and the team reflects on the reasons of their dismissal.
12	"Trouble"	February 4, 2025
Having new identities, the team flies to Cerdova for their new mission. Despite Greg's orders to avoid getting attention, trouble seems to find them.
13	"Pursuit"	February 5, 2025
Andres sets out on a personal mission, increasing JB's suspicion. JB and Max decide to keep an eye on Andres, but this leads them to someone else.
14	"Face to Face"	February 6, 2025
Trying to get an intel on their target, Tomas runs into someone suspicious. Andres puts on an act to gain the trust of Timor's associate.
15	"Ambush"	February 7, 2025
Finding an opportunity, JB and Andres immediately takes into action that goes against Greg's plan. This leads the team to dangerous consequences.
16	"Cerdova"	February 10, 2025
After retrieving Miguel and Tomas, Greg swoops in to rescue Max, JB and Andres from the crossfire. Together, they must make a daring escape from Cerdova.
17	"Motive"	February 11, 2025
The team stays at the hideout while awaiting further orders, but Andres' emotions take over when he's face to face with the gang leader.
18	"Bargain"	February 12, 2025
After an outburst that injures their target, Greg talks to Andres about his temper. Timor uses the situation to his advantage.
19	"Assault"	February 13, 2025
Timor tries to find an ally within the Contractor's team, prompting JB, Andres and Max to reconcile. Masked figures attack the hideout.
20	"Headshot"	February 14, 2025
The team must protect their valuable asset as their hideout falls under siege. While on guard, JB receives a startling claim that rattles him.
21	"Kings"	February 17, 2025
Miguel lashes out at the team when they face the fallout from the attack on their hideout. Later, JB considers his next steps with his father in mind.
22	"Corner"	February 18, 2025
As the Escaleras conduct their illegal ring, Andres trails a lead to uncover their location. Elsewhere, Tomas' impulsive good deed backfires on him.
23	"Drive"	February 19, 2025
Andres prepares for a risky scheme against the Escaleras. As JB recruits Max to hack an encrypted file, a frustrated Gabriela confronts her father.
24	"Underdogs"	February 20, 2025
Andres' stakeout goes south, prompting him to regroup and seek help from JB. Meanwhile, Gabriela makes a crafty move to bail Tomas out of a jam.
25	"Double Trouble"	February 21, 2025
Facing a hurdle, JB contacts Max for help on Andres' scheme. Tomas works a side job for Gabriela while Miguel makes a desperate play for his son.
26	"Ransack"	February 24, 2025
When Andres launches his scheme against the Escaleras with his team, they fall into a trap. Tomas finally learns what he must retrieve for Gabriela.
27	"Unforgiven"	February 25, 2025
Max struggles with a major tech issue while Gabriela finishes Tomas' mission. Elsewhere, Miguel gets into an altercation with Christine's new partner.
28	"Hotel"	February 26, 2025
While Andres makes necessary preparations before a violent showdown, a pleasant hotel faces serious trouble from a charismatic figure.
29	"Detected"	February 27, 2025
Greg accepts a contract from an old ally and briefs the team on their new mission: rescue a hotel from the grips of a shadowy leader named Rema Muñoz.
30	"Trap"	February 28, 2025
The team deals with turmoil as they prepare for their mission. Meanwhile, workers and guests at the hotel scramble for safety from Muñoz's followers.
31	"Detected"	March 3, 2025
The team races to stop Muñoz's men before more hostages die, while the Escalera gang hunts for Clover's phone to track who stole the master list.
32	"Back Up"	March 4, 2025
Despite being cautious, Rema's group finds out about the team's operation. The mission gets complicated when an unexpected backup arrives.
33	"Sacrifice"	March 5, 2025
Tomas works to help a pregnant woman, while JB attempts to reunite a hostage with her husband. Police intervention at the hotel adds new challenges.
34	"Together"	March 6, 2025
Andres helps Tomas with a hostage, while Gabriela discovers a group of students who refuse to leave without their coach.
35	"Delivery"	March 7, 2025
Things heat up when the Escalera gang closes in on the location. Miguel guides Andres as the pregnant hostage goes into labor.
36	"Devotion"	March 10, 2025
Muñoz's subordinates attempt to jeopardize the mission, but help arrives in time. A life hangs in the balance as Miguel faces a harrowing dilemma.
37	"Ring"	March 11, 2025
Max enters the hotel to assist in the mission but soon realizes her ring is missing. As the team evacuates hostages, the Escalera gang makes their move.
38	"Sinners"	March 12, 2025
Muñoz's plan begins to collapse when a follower questions his actions. The cult leader initiates the countdown of the bombs around the hotel.
39	"Half Truth"	March 13, 2025
As the team rushes to free the remaining hostages, JB and Miguel work to defuse the bombs. Andres and Muñoz face off in a tense showdown.
40	"Swords"	March 14, 2025
Andres asks Max for the hard drive, promising to deal with the tracker. Greg reveals to Col. Locsin that he knows about Sen. Lacosta's deal with Muñoz.
41	"Source"	March 17, 2025
The Escaleras keep searching for the thief while Andres checks the master list for his brother. Greg gets a tip about what happened at the safe house.
42	"Betrayal"	March 18, 2025
After receiving key intel, JB confronts his father about the intruders and his tattoo. Gabriela storms her dad's house to ask about Tomas.
43	"No Escape"	March 19, 2025
JB blocks Andres from talking to his father about the Escaleras. Meanwhile, Greg's new contract threatens to expose the safehouse siege.
44	"Close to Home"	March 20, 2025
Max panics after JB reveals Greg's new contract, especially with Andres out of reach — unaware that he's infiltrated Isabel Escalera's quarters.
45	"Compadre"	March 21, 2025
As the Escaleras meet at Isabel's to discuss the master list, JB and Andres clash over the hard drive. Miguel fears he's being followed.
46	"Head"	March 24, 2025
After Andres asks JB for more time with the hard drive, Greg discusses the new contract with him. Miguel tries to make amends with his family.
47	"Lifeline"	March 25, 2025
Time is running out for Andres as Greg orders the team to find Isabel. He enters a high-stakes negotiation with the Escalera matriarch.
48	"The Killing List"	March 26, 2025
A string of high-profile assassinations sparks tension within the Escalera family. Isabel blackmails Andres to get the hard drive back.
49	"Rogue Protector"	March 27, 2025
The team zeroes in on Diamond and the gang, but as assailants arrive on the scene, Andres must make a confession. JB rushes to protect his father.
50	"Departure"	March 28, 2025
Andres tries to evade the mystery attackers and get Isabel to safety. JB defends his father while the rest of the team continues the mission.
51	"Mad Man"	March 31, 2025
While Andres helps Isabel escape, she entrusts him with a message. Max reveals the truth about the hard drive to Greg.
52	"Face the Music"	April 1, 2025
After the mission ends, Greg and JB have a heart-to-heart about the hard drive and Andres. Meanwhile, masked men abduct Miguel.
53	"Crackdown"	April 2, 2025
Greg goes through Andres' file, while Gabriela confronts her father after he sells a beloved house. JB vows to take down the Elcano organization.
54	"No Surrender"	April 3, 2025
Max returns her fiancé's ring to his mother, leading to a heartfelt conversation. Andres faces the team after the fallout of their last mission.
55	"Brand New Day"	April 4, 2025
Greg takes on a contract to take down Sameo Patel, a drug trafficker with suspicious ties. Andres considers buying back his family's land.
56	"Mountain"	April 7, 2025
A bad investment forces Tomas' godfather into hiding. Miguel tightens security around Christine and his son. JB leads the team into their mission.
57	"Tropic Storm"	April 8, 2025
While the team camps near a village, Miguel sees Sameo's subordinates heading for their campsite. Greg learns the truth about his friend.
58	"Passage"	April 9, 2025
Andres send guards to protect his family, but his grandmother is weary. Meanwhile, a storm arrives as the team heads to Sameo's stronghold.
59	"Storage"	April 10, 2025
The team pushes to complete the mission in heavy rain and Greg talks to Claire — his friend's wife — about what happened to her husband.
60	"Loot"	April 11, 2025
After clearing the hideout, the team splits up on route to the exit point. But a young member of Sameo's gang soon warns the others.
61	"Desperados"	April 14, 2025
On the way out of Mt. Talimba, Andres and Miguel discuss their financial needs while Max and Gabriela search for their missing horse, while JB and Tomas realize that they are being hunted.
62	"Boy"	April 15, 2025
Andres and Miguel try to make a daring rescue. Max and Gabriela search for their missing horse, while JB and Tomas realize that they are being hunted.
63	"Money Matters"	April 16, 2025
Andres wrestles with guilt over leaving the girl behind, while Tomas and JB struggle with the long journey and reflect on the past.
64	"Intentions"	April 21, 2025
A villager sees Andres and Miguel and seeks medical assistance. Meanwhile, Rita finds her brother, but he won't leave until he finds the intruders.
65	"Gray Area"	April 22, 2025
JB and Timas hide from Sameo's gang, while a hiker's scream briefly pulls Gabriela and Max away from their bags of money.
66	"Cash Flow"	April 23, 2025
As Andres and Miguel exchange fire with Emer, JB and Tomas escape from their assailants. Meanwhile, Max and Gabriela discover a devious trick.
67	"Payback"	April 24, 2025
While searching for the two hikers, Max and Gabriela face off against Benjie and his men. Andres assists a wounded Miguel.
68	"All for the Family"	April 25, 2025
Andres' grandmother confronts him about the money, while Gabriela gives her dad part of the payment for the old house, sparking an emotional talk.
69	"Secret Contact"	April 28, 2025
As Miguel and Christine talk about their son's future, Max gives back an orphanage and Greg unexpectedly turns down a contract.
70	"Checking In"	April 29, 2025
Gabriela has Tomas spy on her father's mistress. Meanwhile, Greg mulls over Isabel's last words as Andres hunts for a lead on his brother.
71	"Option"	April 30, 2025
Unable to reach Miguel, Greg briefs the team without him on their next mission: to capture assassin Kenji Lee and find out who hired him.
72	"Kaigen"	May 1, 2025
With his father's condition worsening under custody, JB grows more determined to free him as the team gets ready to go to Kaigen in pursuit of Kenji.
73	"Snowfall"	May 1, 2025
While the team adjusts to the cold, they realize they're not the only ones hunting Kenji. With his family in peril, Miguel seeks help from Andres.
74	"Bad Weather"	May 5, 2025
As Greg reunites with and old friend, Max gets an important phone call while Gabriela decides to split from Tomas to survey the area in peace.
75	"Eye of the Storm"	May 6, 2025
While looking for Gabriela, the team shifts focus when Andres spots Kenji. Back in the Philippines, Miguel shakes off his family's stalkers.
76	"Frozen"	May 7, 2025
Greg talks to a despondent Andres after the team hits a snag in the mission. Tomas opens up about his brother, while Max's news to gives hope to JB.
77	"Snow Drift"	May 8, 2025
As Max talks to Andres about loss and moving on, JB reflects on his last conversation with his father. Meanwhile, Miguel prepares for a showdown.
78	"Slippery Slope"	May 9, 2025
JB trails Kenji on a daring snowmobile chase as the rest of the team closes in. But things get complicated when the local mafia joins the hunt.
79	"Blood on the Snow"	May 12, 2025
To find Kenji, Max uses city cameras and tracks him down. Andres' grandmother goes to the agency to confirm the news about Jun.
80	"Cold Blood"	May 13, 2025
Unable to move due to his condition, JB helplessly watches as Tomas fends off the Rai Jins alone. Meanwhile, Miguel continues his onslaught.
81	"Departures"	May 14, 2025
Rattled by Kenji's words, the team questions whether they should complete the contract or not. Greg makes a call to determine their course of action.
82	"Traitors"	May 15, 2025
As Andres reunites with his family, he and his grandmother discuss their suspicions about Jun. Elsewhere, Max voices concerns about JB's father's case.
83	"Enduring Love"	May 16, 2025
After the Kaigen mission, the team reunites for another get-together with Miguel. Later, Andres' grandmother urges him to move on from his search.
84	"One Step Closer"	May 19, 2025
JB turns into a violent as he pursues the man who conned him. Tomas goes on his first date with Agnes, while Gab confronts Shari at a yoga class.
85	"Love and Drugs"	May 20, 2025
A meeting with a young man raises new suspicions for Andres. As Gabriela breaks down over her mother's death, her father issues an ultimatum.
86	"Bad Ideas"	May 21, 2025
Gabriela struggles to reclaim her mother's resthouse, but Tomas has an idea. JB and Max continue plotting against the El Cano group.
87	"Contractfully Yours"	May 22, 2025
JB and Max get a possible lead on the El Cano organization. Tomas tells Ninong about his deal with Gabriela, while Gab speaks to her father.
88	"Brother"	May 23, 2025
While Greg searches for Raven, he remembers the mission that cost him his team their lives. Gabriela's father confronts Tomas, questioning his intentions.
89	"Promises to Keep"	May 26, 2025
After Dexter's meet-up with Manuel, JB and Max tail the target's car. Gabriela and Tomas move forward with their plan under her father's watchful eye.
90	"Suspicions"	May 27, 2025
As a celebration unfolds in Andres' home, Gabriela and Tomas endure an awkward dinner with her father and Ninong as they try not to blow their cover.
91	"Collision Course"	May 28, 2025
Unfazed by Diego's odd behavior, Andres talks to his grandmother about reclaiming their land. The next day, Greg briefs the team on their new mission.
92	"At All Costs"	May 29, 2025
Seeking to trail Diego, JB and Greg keep watch on Andres, while Max and Miguel comb through an event's guest list for suspicious names.
93	"Home"	May 30, 2025
As Andres confronts Diego about whether he's been avoiding him, Gabriela grows emotional over an unexpected gift from her father.
94	"Meet Up"	June 2, 2025
After clashing with Greg, Andres cools off with JB's help as the three reach a compromise on the mission. Meanwhile, Tomas runs into and old classmate.
95	"Hunted"	June 3, 2025
When the target leaves after meeting Andres, Greg and JB follow him to his base. Elsewhere, Gabriela presses Tomas about a woman he was seen with.
96	"Gathering"	June 4, 2025
As a charity event begins, the team prepares for the mission head of Sec. Barrios' arrival. Buth they might not be the only ones surveilling the area.
97	"The Uninvited"	June 5, 2025
The team scrambles when an unexpected guest arrives but they continue to prioritize the target. Gabriela confronts a potentially compromised Tomas.
98	"Party at High Noon"	June 6, 2025
Miguel reports an unscheduled delivery at the event, sensing trouble. JB keeps the new guest occupied as Sec. Barrios rehearses her speech.
99	"Death is Calling"	June 9, 2025
The mission grows complicated when Miguel mistakes a musician for a threat and Sec. Barrios veers off-program. Meanwhile, Greg confronts on an old friend.
100	"In Plain Sight"	June 10, 2025
Fearing for Ninong's life, Tomas follows the orders of an unknown caller. Max fills Greg in on the unexpected guest and Miguel's theory about the mix-up.
101	"Panic Room"	June 11, 2025
When an emergency occurs at the event, the team grows concerned when Tomas begins acting suspiciously, prompting Andres to tail him.
102	"Puppeteer"	June 12, 2025
Torn between completing the mission and protecting Tomas, the team decides to split up. Gabriela goes to help Ninong after Max gives her potential leads.
103	"The Decision to Kill"	June 13, 2025
As Gabriela continues to search for Ninong, the caller gives Tomas a shocking directive. Meanwhile, Max tells Greg about the snag mission.
104	"Done For"	June 16, 2025
The clock is ticking as Andres tries to stop the caller from pushing through with the plan, while Tomas moves to fulfill the final command.
105	"Crossfire"	June 17, 2025
A hallway shootout results in multiple casualties — and one hits close to home for Andres. Max, Tomas and Miguel rush to evacuate the area.
106	"Devastation"	June 18, 2025
As the team scrambles to get urgent medical care for the shootout victims, Miguel rushes to Andres' side while he anxiously waits for an update.
107	"The Dead and the Dying"	June 19, 2025
When Tomas mentions backing out of his job, he and Gabriela get some advice. Meanwhile, Miguel tries to support Andres through a difficult time.
108	"Sudden Impact"	June 20, 2025
While Andres confronts Manuel about the shootout, Tomas joins Gabriela to meet her father, but a surprise encounter with an armed man derails their plan.
109	"What You Wish For"	June 23, 2025
Greg arrives at Andres' home to pay respects, but meets resistance. Andres works to buy his family's land and JB seeks to keep his injuries a secret.
110	"All Said and Done"	June 24, 2025
Andres' grandmother urges him to let go of the past, while JB shares good news with his father. Missing his family, Miguel marks an important milestone.
111	"Death on the Horizon"	June 25, 2025
While Andres and his family celebrate with the community, Gabriela is caught off guard when she sees her father calling Tomas phone.
112	"Fall Out"	June 26, 2025
Tomas gets surprising news from Ninong, urging him to return home. A child delivers a suspicious package to Max's house as JB goes to pick up his father.
113	"The Killing Time"	June 27, 2025
After receiving news of a threat, the team realizes they might not be the only targets and frantically rush home to protect their loved ones.
114	"Bloodshed"	June 30, 2025
Manuel's plan swings into action, sending the team reeling. Noticing his silence, Andres' grandmother asks if he misses life in the city.
115	"Vendetta"	July 1, 2025
While Greg and Miguel keep watch over a devastated Max, Gabriela tries to make amends with her father before it's too late.
116	"No Turning Back"	July 2, 2025
After an emotional update from Miguel about the state of the team following the Barrios mission, Andres agrees to meet with Greg.
117	"Bullets"	July 3, 2025
Greg calls in reinforcements as the team prepares to launch their attack on Manuel's potential stronghold while rescuing the children imprisoned there.
118	"War"	July 4, 2025
Ahead of the strike, Greg and the team air out their grief and grievances as they come to terms with the cost of their mission.
119	"Split"	July 7, 2025
Andres and JB reconcile over their losses. After witnessing cruelty at the stronghold, Tomas and Gabriela wants to act, but Miguel urges caution.
120	"We Move as a Team"	July 8, 2025
The team carefully advances through the stronghold. But before they can attempt their strike, Andres must reach the kidnapped children.
121	"Get Your Guns Out"	July 9, 2025
Max lands in trouble when El Cano operatives swarm around her, while Andres' team discovers there are more children being held captive.
122	"Heart of Darkness"	July 10, 2025
Caught in a perilous shoot-out, Gabriel and Tomas take a moment to make peace. Meanwhile, Andres attempts to honor a child's request.
123	"This Time for Heroes"	July 11, 2025
Greg and the gang try to lure Manuel and the rest of El Cano out with threats of gunfire. But when they're nowhere to be seen, the team gets suspicious.
124	"Bad Time to Die"	July 14, 2025
Danger continues as the team spots bomb traps in the buildings. Greg realizes the El Cano is using a sinister weapon for deadly attacks.
125	"Kontraktwalistas"	July 15, 2025
Andres and Tomas attempt to rescue a teammate in trouble as El Cano forces threaten to gun them down. JB's condition puts him and Max in a bind.
126 (Note: The title released on TV is titled Jaguar)	"Redemption"	July 16, 2025
As JB and Max try to escape El Cano operatives, they must fend off Manuel's right hand man. Meanwhile Miguel helps out Gabriela.
127	"Exit Point"	July 17, 2025
While JB and Max continue the fight against Manuel's henchman, Greg confronts an old friend to finish the mission once and for all.
128	"Love and Honor"	July 18, 2025
As Greg vows to take down El Cano, Gabriela discuss their relationship, while Andres gets a visitor he wasn't expecting. In a post-credit scene, Greg is in Halden talking on the phone to a person named Snake to look for a new sniper who is as good as Jaguar.

== Production ==
Incognito reportedly had a limited budget and equipment with the cast smaller than a typical television series. Principal photography commenced in September 2024 in Matera and Bari in Italy. By February 2025, filming has moved to Yamagata, Japan amidst heavy snowfall.

Filming also took place in other places in the Philippines including Itogon and Baguio, Benguet and El Nido, Palawan. A resort in El Nido was used to depict Isla Rosa, the island which was used as a headquarters by the series' protagonists. The last scenes were captured in Marawi in June 2025.

The second season started filming in Tawi-Tawi.

== Release ==
Incognito was first released on Netflix on January 17, 2025, or three days before its broadcast on traditional television. It premiered at Kapamilya Channel and other television channels & platforms on January 20, 2025.

== Reception ==
=== Ratings and viewership ===
Upon its release, Incognito went number one on Netflix's most watched shows in the Philippines. The series opened with 585,973 peak concurrent live viewers on its premiere on Kapamilya Online Live streamed through YouTube. On February 21, 2025, Incognito attained its all-time viewership record of 997,260 concurrent live viewers.

According to AGB Nielsen Philippines' Nationwide Urban Television Audience Measurement People in television homes, Incognito premiered with 8.7% rating. On February 10, 2025, the series garnered a 10% rating, becoming the third most watched program in the Philippines.

=== Accolades ===
Accolades received by Incognito
Award	Date of ceremony	Category	Recipient(s)	Result	Ref.
2025 Asian Academy Creative Awards	October 1, 2025	Best Drama Series	Incognito	Won	
8th Gawad Lasallianeta	January 26, 2026	Most Outstanding Actor in a Lead Role	Richard Gutierrez	Nominated	
8th Gawad Lasallianeta	January 26, 2026	Most Outstanding Actor in a Supporting Role	Maris Racal	Won	
Laurus Nobilis Media Excellence Awards 2026	March 2026	Media Excellence in Television Drama		Nominated	
Laurus Nobilis Media Excellence Awards 2026	March 2026	Media Excellence in Television Drama Acting (Female Category)	Kaila Estrada	Nominated	
Content Asia Awards	August 2026	Best Drama TV Series Made in Asia for a Single Asian Market	Incognito	Nominated	
