= My Papa Pi =

2022 Philippine television sitcom series

- Official release poster
- Genre: Sitcom
- Written by: Maan Dimaculangan-Fampulme; Gena Tenaja
- Directed by: Cathy Garcia-Molina
- Starring: Piolo Pascual; Pia Wurtzbach; Pepe Herrera
- Opening theme: "My Papa Pi" by Piolo Pascual, Pia Wurtzbach, and Pepe Herrera
- Ending theme: "My Papa Pi" by Piolo Pascual, Pia Wurtzbach, and Pepe Herrera
- Composers: Timothy Joseph Cardona; Marlon Nabia
- Country of origin: Philippines
- Original language: Filipino
- No. of seasons: 1
- No. of episodes: 13

Production
- Executive producers: Carlo L. Katigbak; Cory V. Vidanes; Laurenti M. Dyogi
- Production location: Quezon City
- Running time: 45 minutes
- Production company: Star Creatives

Original release
- Network: Kapamilya Channel; A2Z
- Release: March 19 – June 18, 2022

My Papa Pi is a Philippine television sitcom series broadcast by Kapamilya Channel and A2Z. Directed by Cathy Garcia-Molina, it stars Piolo Pascual, Pepe Herrera, and Pia Wurtzbach. It aired on the network's Yes Weekend! evening line up from March 19 to June 18, 2022, and was replaced by the second season of Idol Philippines.

== Premise ==
In the fictional Barangay Mapag-asa, twin brothers Pipoy and Popoy live different lives despite living in the same house. Pipoy is a single father looking for a better life for his daughter, while Popoy is a successful entrepreneur who owns One More Tumbong that sells tumbong, a special pork intestine soup. Tere, the neighbor of the twins, is a kind-hearted woman whom Popoy aims to earn her heart for him, but has feelings for Pipoy.

Early on, Popoy suddenly dies in an accident, but only to return to Barangay Mapag-asa as a ghost only Pipoy could see and hear. Knowing he can take over his twin brother, Popoy finds the perfect timing to pursue the clueless Tere.

== Cast and characters ==
- Piolo Pascual as Policarpio "Pipoy" Papa III
- Pia Wurtzbach as Tere
- Pepe Herrera as Policarpio "Popoy" Papa Jr.
- Joross Gamboa as Boy Tinga
- Katya Santos as Delia
- Alora Sasam as Chrissie
- Frenchie Dy as Marichu
- Haiza Madrid as Analyn
- Hyubs Azarcon as Chip
- Daisy "Madam Inutz" Lopez as Madam Bebe
- Daniela Stranner as Charmaine
- Anthony Jennings as Harvee
- Quincy Villanueva as Sheena
- Allyson McBride as Mikay

== Episodes ==
Season	Episodes	Originally released	
Season	Episodes	First released	Last released
1	13	March 19, 2022	June 18, 2022

- iWantTFC shows one episode first in advance before its television broadcast.

No. overall	No. in season	Title	Original release date	AGB Nielsen Ratings (NUTAM People)
1	1	"Hopefuls"	March 19, 2022	N/A
Upon realizing that his only chance to win Tere's heart is to become a million richer, Popoy resorts to his and his twin brother Pipoy's favorite hobby-gambling. The horse betting race, however, thrills Popoy to death, figuratively and literally. Additional cast: Anthony Andres, George Ramilo, Robert Sanchez, Allyson McBride
2	2	"Yayamanins"	March 26, 2022	2.3%
Determined to have a grand wedding with the man of her dreams, Tere accepts her friend's enticing business offer. Things take a turn for the worse for the bride-to-be when Popoy suddenly gets expelled from Pipoy's body. Additional cast: Anthony Andres, George Ramilo, Robert Sanchez, Nicole Cordoves
3	3	"Judge Me, Not!"	April 2, 2022	N/A
Convinced that Pipoy is suffering from amnesia, Tere resorts to desperate measures to help him regain his memories. Harvee receives a mission when a series of theft incidents hits Mapag-asa following the arrival of Tere's cousin, Charmaine. Additional cast: Anthony Andres, George Ramilo, Robert Sanchez
4	4	"Family is Forever"	April 9, 2022	N/A
When Delia suspects that Chip is having an affair, Tere helps her confirm her hunch. Popoy feels helpless as Pipoy firmly refuses to let him possess his body again. Getting wind of Chudy Ann's plan to send Mikay abroad, Popoy resolves to take action. Additional cast: Anthony Andres, George Ramilo, Robert Sanchez, Allyson McBride
5	5	"Tsismis Pa More"	April 23, 2022	2.1%
Rumors surface that Popoy's soul enters Pipoy's body to make his signature tumbong dish. When it spreads like wildfire, a vlogger hungry for interesting content arrives at Mapag-asa to uncover the mystery. Additional cast: Anthony Andres, George Ramilo, Robert Sanchez, Allyson McBride, Martha Comia
6	6	"Surprise!"	April 30, 2022	1.6%
Pipoy does everything in his power to make Mikay happy on her upcoming birthday. Learning that Chudy Ann will attend Mikay's party, Tere goes the extra mile to ensure she is the apple of Pipoy's eye. Her efforts, in turn, make Popoy jealous. Additional cast: Anthony Andres, George Ramilo, Robert Sanchez, Allyson McBride
7	7	"Date Night"	May 7, 2022	N/A
Tere signs up on an online dating app as she resolves to keep her distance from Pipoy. The relentless Popoy then grabs this chance to score a date with his one true love. Additional cast: Anthony Andres, George Ramilo, Robert Sanchez, Allyson McBride
8	8	"Spell Love"	May 14, 2022	2.0%
While Harvee gets to know Charmaine more, Pipoy copes with Tere's resignation from the eatery. Javier returns to Mapag-asa to seek Marichu's forgiveness. Wanting to fix everything, the three men devise a gimmick to woo the women in their lives. Additional cast: Anthony Andres, George Ramilo, Robert Sanchez, Allyson McBride, Ian Veneracion
9	9	"Til WiFi Do Us Part"	May 21, 2022	2.2%
Pipoy's tech-savvy neighbors go berserk when his Wi-Fi connection goes off. Disappointed, Mikay packs her bag to search for stable internet while Popoy finds ways to recharge his energy. Tere, meanwhile, preserves her precious memory with Pipoy. Additional cast: Anthony Andres, George Ramilo, Robert Sanchez, Allyson McBride
10	10	"Break It Down, Yow"	May 28, 2022	1.8%
An air of competitiveness surrounds Mapag-asa as Harvee joins a rap battle against a seasoned rapper from a neighboring barangay while Pipoy and Popoy argue about Tere. Later, misfortune befalls the twin brothers' eatery and heirloom ladle. Additional cast: Anthony Andres, George Ramilo, Robert Sanchez, Allyson McBride, Kritiko
11	11	"My Only Luck"	June 4, 2022	1.6%
All hope is lost for Pipoy and Popoy as they fail to revive the burnt heirloom ladle. With the eatery on the verge of closing forever, Tere comes up with a solution. Meanwhile, Marichu forces Charmaine to join a beauty pageant. Additional cast: Anthony Andres, George Ramilo, Robert Sanchez, Allyson McBride
12	12	"Deal Or No Deal"	June 11, 2022	N/A
Pipoy and Popoy find themselves in a bind when Marichu refuses to let go of the Papa's prized heirloom ladle. While Tere and the Hopefuls help reclaim the lucky ladle and save the eatery from doom, Pipoy receives a wake-up call. Additional cast: Anthony Andres, George Ramilo, Robert Sanchez, Allyson McBride
13	13	"Where Do Broken Hearts Go"	June 18, 2022	1.5%
The Hopefuls are enticed to transfer their businesses to a grander location. Ahead of her big move, Tere plans to confess her feelings to Pipoy. Meanwhile, Pipoy's ex returns with a request, and Popoy gets his heart broken. Additional cast: Anthony Andres, George Ramilo, Robert Sanchez, Allyson McBride

== Production ==
My Papa Pi is produced under Star Creatives, a television production arm of Star Cinema, with Cathy Garcia-Molina as its director.

=== Casting ===
The casting of Piolo Pascual and Pia Wurtzbach served as their reunion project after Wurtzbach, then credited as Pia Romero, had a brief appearance in the 2005 sitcom Bora. ABS-CBN initially selected Angelica Panganiban for the role of Tere, but instead gave the role to Wurtzbach. Star Creatives did not give any statement to why they replaced Panganiban with Wurtzbach. The show marks the teleserye acting debut for Anthony Jennings who previously starred in the 2021 movie Love at First Stream, and the acting debut for Madam Inutz who had previously took part as a celebrity housemate in Pinoy Big Brother: Kumunity Season 10.
