= The House Arrest of Us =

Philippine romantic comedy streaming television series by Richard Arellano

- Promotional poster
- Genre: Romantic comedy
- Written by: Carmi Raymundo; Crystal San Miguel; Carmel Josine Jacomille; John Leo Garcia
- Directed by: Richard Arellano
- Starring: Kathryn Bernardo; Daniel Padilla
- Country of origin: Philippines
- Original language: Filipino
- No. of seasons: 1
- No. of episodes: 13

Production
- Executive producers: Carlo Katigbak; Olivia Lamasan
- Producers: John Leo Garcia; Carmi Raymundo; Marizel Samson-Martinez
- Production location: Philippines
- Cinematography: Gary Gardoce
- Editor: Beng Bandong
- Camera setup: Single-camera
- Production company: Star Cinema

Original release
- Network: iWantTFC; KTX.ph; Netflix
- Release: October 24, 2020 – January 16, 2021

The House Arrest of Us is a Philippine romantic comedy streaming television series starring Kathryn Bernardo and Daniel Padilla, directed by Richard Arellano and written by Carmi Raymundo. It is about an engaged couple who get locked in one house with both their families. The series was produced under Star Cinema and was first made available online on October 24, 2020, on KTX, iWantTFC and TFC IPTV PPV.

== Plot ==
Korics and Q at long last choose to get ready for marriage. However, as Korics' enormous freed family goes to Q's critical and nouveau riche family for the pamamanhikan (courtship), the government abruptly declares a total hard lockdown. The couple should live with one another and their fighting families during the COVID-19 pandemic.

== Cast ==
=== Main ===
- Kathryn Bernardo as Queencess "Q" Capili
- Daniel Padilla as Enrico "Korics" de Guzman

=== Supporting ===
- Herbert Bautista as Sylverter "Sylver" Capili
- Ruffa Gutierrez as Zenaida "Zena" Capili
- Gardo Versoza as Rudy "Papawan" de Guzman
- Arlene Muhlach as Bernadette "Berna" de Guzman
- Dennis Padilla as Papatu
- Anthony Jennings as Rufus de Guzman
- Riva Quenery as Abigail "Abi" de Guzman
- Alora Sasam as Yaya Marie
- Hyubs Azarcon as Mang Roger
- Marc Logan as the Interviewer
- Ria Atayde as Q's best friend
- Juan Miguel Severo as Q's best friend
- Summer Ford as herself

=== Guest ===
- Kakai Bautista as Estella

== Production ==
The digital series was shot during the enhanced community quarantine in Luzon imposed in early 2020 as a response to the COVID-19 pandemic. Bernardo and Padilla said that it is hard for them to shoot the series project because they need to follow various pandemic-related safety protocols with the cast not allowed to go out of the village were the series was filmed. Bernardo also clarified that digital series was not connected to their 2018 film The Hows of Us, other than the similarity of the name of the series with the film.

== Release ==
The House Arrest of Us was first made available on October 24, 2020, through KTX.ph. It was also released through iWantTFC. Episodes were released weekly, with the last episode made available on January 16, 2021.

The series was also made available for streaming on Netflix in the Philippines starting February 1, 2021. Netflix reached out to the producers of the series for rights to stream the series even before its original run ended.
