= Anthony Jennings (actor) =

Filipino-British actor (born 2000)

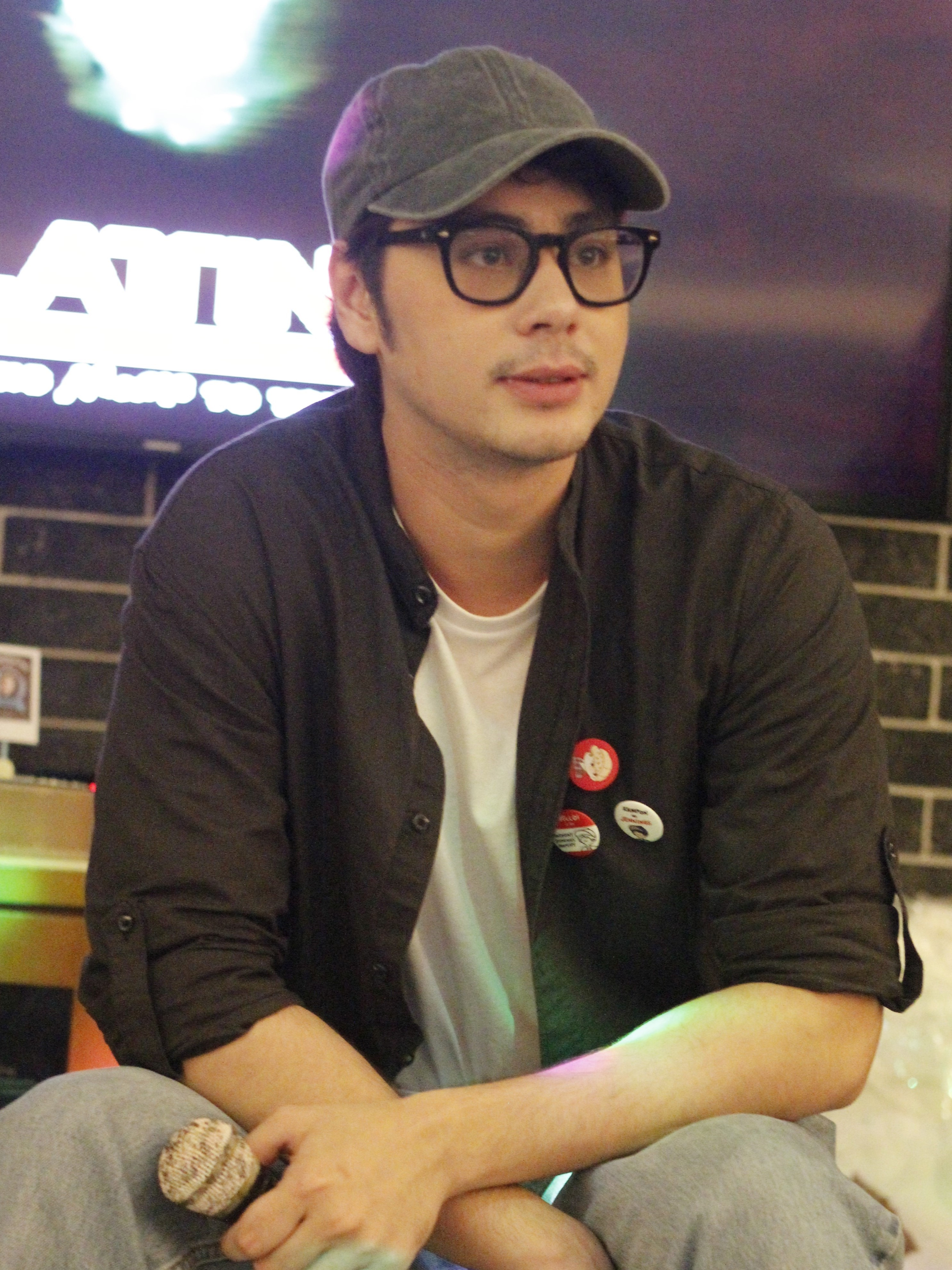
- Jennings in 2024
- Born: Anthony Michael Jennings; November 1, 2000 (age 25); Cauayan, Negros Occidental
- Occupation: Actor
- Years active: 2019–present
- Agent(s): Star Magic (2019–present); Rise Artists Studio (2020–present)

Anthony Michael Jennings (born November 1, 2000) is a Filipino actor. He gained mainstream recognition for his supporting role as Snoop in the ABS-CBN romantic drama series Can't Buy Me Love with his on-screen partner Maris Racal. Jennings has also starred in Incognito and will star in Nurse the Dead.

== Early life ==
Anthony Michael Jennings grew up in Barangay Mambugsay, Cauayan, Negros Occidental with his grandparents. His father is British, and his mother is a Filipina. In an article, he describes his childhood years as constantly moving from one house to another due to financial problems. He also stated that he only finished second grade and was not able to learn how to read or write early on. When he was auditioning for a role in a show, he only knew how to read but didn't know how to write yet. He later learned to read and write.

== Career ==
Jennings was included in the pool of Star Magic actors and actresses in 2019. He started his acting career in the film Hello, Love, Goodbye, and was also featured in Love at First Stream, The House Arrest of Us, and The Iron Heart. He also has a YouTube channel.

In 2023, Jennings was cast as Snoop Manansala in the romantic drama television series Can't Buy Me Love. His on-screen pairing with Maris Racal instantly became one of the most popular love teams of the decade. He was also an endorser of Mang Inasal Pork barbecue alongside Racal.

In 2025, Jennings starred as Tomas Guerrero in the action drama television series Incognito. In 2026, he plays the role of Grim in the supernatural workplace comedy television series Nurse the Dead, with Princess Punzalan, Ruby Rodriguez, and Mexican actor Pablo Azar.

== Personal life ==
Jennings dated a woman outside the entertainment industry named Jamela Villanueva. In November 2024, he confirmed his breakup with Villanueva. In a February 2024 interview, Jennings claimed that they had been together for five years, while in November 2024, Villanueva claimed that they had been together for "nearly seven years". On December 3, Villanueva alleged that Jennings cheated on her with Maris Racal and released screenshots of Racal's intimate private conversations with Jennings. On December 6, Racal publicly apologized to Villanueva and her supporters. She accused Jennings of deceiving her, alleging that he repeatedly claimed to have broken up with Villanueva in private. In her statement, Racal added that she was "sad" about her intimate conversations being posted without her consent and "[felt] like[...] a naked woman walking" every time she went out, following the release of the screenshots. Jennings issued a public apology directed towards both Villanueva and Racal, also on December 6.

== Filmography ==
=== Movies ===
Year	Title	Role	Ref
2019	Hello, Love, Goodbye	Eric del Rosario	
2019	Unbreakable	Mark Salvador	
2021	Love at First Stream	Christopher "Tupe" Rodriguez	
2024	Hello, Love, Again	Eric del Rosario	^{a}
2024	And the Breadwinner Is...	Anton "Tonton" Cruz	
2025	Sosyal Climbers	Ray Cruz / Kiefer Regalado	
TBA	Mother Maybe (Inahing Baka)	Marco	

Notes:
^ ^{a} Special participation.

=== Television ===
Year	Title	Role	Ref.
2020	Make It with You	Rhamboy de Asis	
2020	The House Arrest of Us	Rufus de Guzman	
2022	My Papa Pi	Harvee	
2022	A Family Affair	Dave Estrella (young)	
2022	Love Bites: Lost But Found	Macoy	
2022	Tara, G!	Rocky	
2022–2023	The Iron Heart	Cronus Lopez	
2023–2024	Can't Buy Me Love	Snoop Manansala	
2025	Incognito	Tomas "Tom" Guerrero / Monkey	
2026	Nurse the Dead	Grim	

=== Web shows ===
Year	Title	Episode	Ref.
2022	Dear MOR Celebrity Specials	Heart Wrecker	
2022	Boys After Dark	all episodes	
2024	CBML All Access	all episodes	
2024	Bida/Bida	Love Team Mo, Love Team Ko	

=== Music videos ===
Year	Song	Artist
2021	2am	Sab
2021	No Stopping You (Vertical MV)	SB19
2022	Tara, G!	The Juans
2024	Iyo (with Maris Racal)	Darren Espanto

=== Endorsement ===
Year	Brand	Product / Promo
2019	Toyota Motor Philippines	Toyota Innova^{b}
2024^{c}	Lay's Stax	#LoveStax
2024^{c}	Mang Inasal	Pork Barbecue
2024^{c}	San Mig Coffee	San Mig Sugar Free Coffee
2026	Kyu Kyu Ramen 99	Japanese restaurant chain

Notes:
^ ^{b} with the Mulach family.
^ ^{c} TV commercial with on-screen partner Maris Racal.

== Discography ==
Year	Title	Music label
2022	Tara, G! (cast version)	Star Music
2024	BB Girl	Star Music
