= Stay-In Love =

Philippine romantic comedy television series

- Title card
- Genre: Romantic comedy
- Written by: Alpha Pabon; Joaquin Acosta
- Directed by: Rod Marmol
- Starring: Maris Racal; Kokoy De Santos; Marc David
- Opening theme: "Kahit Na Anong Sablay" by Maris Racal
- Country of origin: Philippines
- Original language: Filipino
- No. of episodes: 13

Production
- Executive producers: Erickson Raymundo; Jeff Vadillo; Robert Galang; Sienna Olaso; Isabel Santillan
- Production location: Philippines
- Editors: Tel Agabe; JJ Gloria
- Camera setup: Single-camera
- Production companies: Cornerstone (CS) Studios; Cignal Entertainment

Original release
- Network: TV5
- Release: November 24, 2020 – February 16, 2021

Stay-In Love is a Philippine romantic comedy television series broadcast by TV5. Directed by Rod Marmol, starring Maris Racal and Kokoy de Santos. The series aired on the network's Primetime Todo evening block from November 24, 2020 to February 16, 2021.

== Plot ==
Diding (Maris Racal) applies to be a maid for a rich, social family where she met Mon (Kokoy de Santos).

== Cast and characters ==
Main cast

- Maris Racal as Diding Saclolo
- Kokoy de Santos as Mon Ortega
- Marc David as Hero Cacao

Supporting cast

- Ruffa Gutierrez as Gigi Lacambra
- Bobby Andrews as Chris Ortega
- Pooh as Dencio Saclolo
- Ashley Colet as Vanna Lacambra
- Denise Joaquin as Beverly
- Charm Aranton as Gelly
- Elsa Droga as Pipay
- Welwel Silvestre as Zsa Zsa
- Meann Espinosa as Manang Luz

== Production ==
Iñigo Pascual was supposedly part of the main cast to play the role of Mon. Due to his conflicting schedules, however, he was later pulled out from the cast. Pascual would be later replaced by Kokoy de Santos in the role of Mon.
