= Jay Gonzaga =

Filipino actor

- Born: Jerson Lafuente; October 23, 1988 (age 38); Buenavista, Agusan del Norte, Philippines
- Other names: James Cordero, Emil Alfaro, Jay Gonzaga, Jerson Lafuente
- Occupations: Actor; Model
- Years active: 2007–present
- Agent: Cornerstone Entertainment
- Height: 5 ft 10 in (1.78 m)
- Website: Jay Gonzaga on Instagram

Jay Gonzaga (born October 23, 1988) is a Filipino actor. He played the role as James Cordero in the action drama television series FPJ's Ang Probinsyano.

== Early life and education ==
Since he was a child, Gonzaga dreamed of becoming an actor and singer, though he initially faced a fear of singing due to criticism from others. After graduating, he began his acting career in theater, notably performing with Dulaang UP in their 2010 production of Orosman at Zafira. This experience helped him develop essential performing skills before transitioning to television and film.

== Acting career ==
Gonzaga started his professional acting journey in theater with Dulaang UP's Orosman at Zafira in 2010. He has since appeared in numerous productions with major companies like the Philippine Educational Theater Association (PETA) and Gantimpala Theater Foundation, including Haring Lear and One More Chance: The Musical. He is a regular fixture in Philippine TV, notably starring in Ang Himala ni Niño (2024–2025) as Badong and FPJ's Batang Quiapo (2025–2026) as Emil Alfaro.

== Acting credits ==
=== Film ===
Key
| † | Denotes films that have not yet been released |

Jay Gonzaga's film credits with year of release, film titles and roles
| Year | Title | Role | Ref. |
|---|---|---|---|
| 2007 | Desperadas | Model | |
| 2016 | Always Be My Maybe | Gay in the bar | |
| 2016 | Ang Taba Ko Kasi | Gordon | |
| 2016 | Sakaling Hindi Nakarating | Mark | |
| 2016 | My Candidate | JV Katipunan | |
| 2016 | Best. Partee. Ever. | Francis | |
| 2017 | Triptiko | Will | |
| 2017 | Chedeng and Apple | Adam | |
| 2018 | My 2 Mommies | Telenovela Driver | |
| 2018 | Tres | —N/a | |
| 2018 | Para sa Broken Hearted | Mr. Breakdown | |
| 2018 | A Short History of a Few Bad Things | Jay Mendoza | |
| 2019 | Hellcome Home | Benjie | |
| 2019 | Sila-Sila | Emman | |
| 2022 | Labyu with an Accent | Sandro | |
| 2023 | Huling Palabas | —N/a | |
| 2023 | Broken Hearts Trip | Benjie | |
| 2025 | Care That Comes from the Heart | Diego | |
| 2025 | The Ride | Goon | |

=== Television ===
Key
| † | Denotes shows that have not yet been aired |

Jay Gonzaga's television credits with year of release, title(s) and role
| Year | Title | Role | Ref. |
|---|---|---|---|
| 2009 | Tayong Dalawa | 2nd Lieutenant | |
| 2010 | Kung Tayo'y Magkakalayo | NBI Agent | |
| 2010 | Kokey at Ako | Hank | |
| 2011 | Sinner or Saint | Albert | |
| 2012 | My Beloved | Mikal | |
| 2013 | Magpakailanman: The Lucy Aroma Story | Toto | |
| 2015 | Wansapanataym: I Heart Kuryente Kid | Cesar | |
| 2015 | Magpakailanman: Paskong Malamig ang Puso | Joseph | |
| 2016 | Wansapanataym: Tikboyong | Tikboyet | |
| 2016 | Magpakailanman: Pinaghiwalay, Pinagtagpo ng Tadhana | Young Arturo | |
| 2016–2017 | Magpahanggang Wakas | Engr. Comia | |
| 2017 | Tabi Po | Linares | |
| 2017–2022 | FPJ's Ang Probinsyano | Major James Cordero | |
| 2018 | Ipaglaban Mo: Hazing | Frat Master | |
| 2018 | Precious Hearts Romances Presents: Araw Gabi | Kidlat | |
| 2018 | Wansapanataym: Switch Be with You | Kulot | |
| 2018 | The End | Gardo | |
| 2019 | Precious Hearts Romances Presents: Los Bastardos | Roy | |
| 2019 | Nang Ngumiti ang Langit | Ramon Ponce | |
| 2020 | Almost Paradise | Hotel Clerk | |
| 2022–2023 | The Iron Heart | Nico | |
| 2023 | Love Bites (season 2) | Ace | |
| 2023 | Can't Buy Me Love | Jaime De Guzman | |
| 2024–2025 | Ang Himala ni Niño | Badong | |
| 2025 | Incognito | CIB Agent Pagundayao | |
| 2025 | Rainbow Rumble | Himself / Contestant | |
| 2025–2026 | FPJ's Batang Quiapo | Emil Alfaro | |
| 2025–2026 | Sing Galing: SINGlebrity Edition | Himself / Contestant | |
| 2026 | My Bespren Emman | Stephen | |

== Accolades ==
| Award | Year | Category | Nominated work | Result | Ref. |
|---|---|---|---|---|---|
| Pinoy Rebyu Awards | 2024 | Best Ensemble Performance | Huling Palabas | Nominated | |
| 2nd Runner-Up | 2026 | "Banal Na Aso, Santong Kabayo" | Sing Galing: SingLebrity Edition | Won | |
