= Can't Buy Me Love (2023 TV series) =

Philippine romantic drama television series

- Promotional poster for the series finale.
- Genre: Romantic drama Mystery; Soap opera
- Written by: Generiza Reyes-Francisco; Rona Co; Gena de Jesus Tenaja; Maan Fampulme; Mary Pearl Urtola
- Directed by: Mae Cruz-Alviar; Cathy Garcia-Sampana; Ian Loreños; Henry King Quitain; Petersen Vargas; Raymund Ocampo
- Starring: Donny Pangilinan; Belle Mariano
- Music by: Jessie Lasaten
- Composer: Rico Blanco
- Country of origin: Philippines
- Original languages: Filipino; Chinese (Hokkien)
- No. of seasons: 2
- No. of episodes: 148 (list of episodes)

Production
- Executive producers: Carlo Katigbak; Cory Vidanes; Laurenti Dyogi
- Producers: Sackey Prince Pendatun; Kristine Prudencio Sioson
- Production locations: Metro Manila; Binondo, Manila; Antipolo, Rizal; New Manila, Quezon City; Batanes
- Cinematography: Dexter Dela Peña; Marcial Tarnate III
- Editor: Kathryn Jerry Perez
- Camera setup: Single camera
- Running time: 20-39 minutes
- Production company: Star Creatives

Original release
- Network: Kapamilya Channel (Note: The series also aired on A2Z, TV5, Jeepney TV and The Filipino Channel. It was also available for streaming via Kapamilya Online Live on YouTube and on-demand via iWantTFC and Netflix Philippines for advanced episodes.)
- Release: October 16, 2023 – May 10, 2024

Can't Buy Me Love is a Philippine romantic drama television series produced by Star Creatives. Directed by Mae Cruz-Alviar, it stars Donny Pangilinan and Belle Mariano. The series aired on Kapamilya Channel's Primetime Bida evening block from October 16, 2023, to May 10, 2024.

== Plot ==
When a young man gets caught up in a deadly plot against a rich woman, he pays a devastating cost to free her — creating a debt that binds them together.

== Cast and characters ==
=== Main cast ===
- Donny Pangilinan as Andrei "Bingo" Mariano

A street-smart, hardworking Filipino boy who was adopted and raised by a poor, yet loving family in Binondo, Manila. Bingo explores different jobs until he begins a loving connection with Caroline after saving her life.

  - Jeremiah Cruz also plays a young Bingo.
- Belle Mariano as Caroline "Ling" Tiu

The black sheep and intelligent daughter of a wealthy Chinese-Filipino family. Caroline has a traumatic past caused by the death of her mother, and she seeks to find all the answers to her questions with the help of Bingo.

  - Chastity Dizon also plays a young Caroline.

=== Supporting cast ===
- Nova Villa as Salvacion "Lola Nene" Rivera

Bingo's loving adoptive grandmother, who lives in a tenement in Binondo, Manila.

- Rowell Santiago as Wilson Tiu

The patriarch of the Tiu family and the president of Golden Lotus Corporation (GLC). Wilson is Caroline's father who adopted her into his family after her mother's death.

- Agot Isidro as Cindy Young-Tiu

Wilson's legal wife and the mother of Charleston, Bettina and Irene. Cindy acts as a cold-hearted step-mother to Caroline.

- Ruffa Gutierrez as Gina Tan

Wilson's mistress and Carlo's mother. Gina is a lawyer serving for the Tiu family, and also Cindy's accomplice.

- Ina Raymundo as Annie Pedrosa-Mariano / Annie Pedrosa-Al Jufalli

Bingo's mother, who abandoned him when he was a child. Annie is also seeking revenge against the Tiu family.

- Maris Racal as Irene Tiu

Cindy and Wilson's youngest daughter and Caroline's half-sister. Irene is a spoiled, alcoholic and sarcastic girl, who later develops a love-hate relationship with Snoop.

  - Althea Ruedas also plays a young Irene.
- Kaila Estrada as Bettina Tiu

Cindy and Wilson's middle daughter and Caroline's half-sister. Bettina is a serious and independent young woman who is engaged to Edward.

  - Jana Agoncillo also plays a young Bettina.
- Albie Casiño as Charleston Tiu

Cindy and Wilson's eldest son and Caroline's older half-brother. Charleston is a rebellious young man with a protective and caring side for Caroline.

- Anthony Jennings as Alfonso "Snoop" Manansala

Bingo's street-smart best friend with a sense of humor. Snoop later forms a romantic bond with Irene.

- Joao Constancia as Carlo Tiu

Gina and Wilson's illegitimate son and Charleston's younger half-brother and accomplice.

  - Robbie Wachtel also plays a young Carlo.
- Darren Espanto (Note: Credited as Darren.) as Stephen Tanhueco

Caroline's childhood friend and ex fiance.

- Celeste Legaspi (Note: Credited as Ms. Celeste Legaspi.) as Catherine "Cathy" Tan King

A Filipino-Chinese businesswoman and Wilson's aunt/godmother, who becomes a mentor to Caroline and Irene.

=== Recurring cast ===
- Rafael Rosell as Sherwin Yuchengco: Annie's trusted ally and Nathan's father, who develops an interest for Bettina.
- Ketchup Eusebio as Ramoncito "Monching" Rivera: Bingo's adoptive father and Lola Nene's son, who also lives at the tenement in Binondo.
- Enzo Pineda as Edward Liao: The only son of the Liao family who is engaged to Bettina. Edward has an affair with Liv.
- Chie Filomeno as Jersey Lim: Caroline and Stephen's best friend.
- Vivoree Esclito (Note: Credited as Vivoree.) as Pandora "Dara" dela Cruz: One of Bingo's neighbors in Binondo. She is also an online seller.
- Karina Bautista as Bougie Dimaranan: One of Bingo's neighbors in Binondo. She had a one sided love for Bingo.
- Rhen Escaño as Olivia "Liv" Almario: Bettina's best friend and Edward's lover.
- Alora Sasam as Bierna: One of Bingo's neighbors in Binondo.
- Gello Marquez as Koriks: One of Bingo's neighbors in Binondo.
- Hyubs Azarcon as Valentin "Kap Tin" de Jesus: A barangay captain in Binondo. He is also Edna's husband.
- Ronnie Lazaro as Abalos "Balong" Pelonio: A mysterious man seeking revenge against the Tiu family.

=== Guest cast ===
- Shaina Magdayao as Divine Almazan: Caroline's mother.
- Bernard Palanca as Ronald Mariano: Bingo's father.
- Alex Medina as Felix Pelonio: Balong's son and accomplice.
- Alwyn Uytingco as Kenny
- Katya Santos as Edna: One of Bingo's neighbors in Binondo. She is also Valentin's wife.
- Bodjie Pascua as Albert Liao: Edward's father and Wilson's business partner.
- Adriana Agcaoili as Marietta Liao: Edward's mother.
- Jay Gonzaga as Jaime de Guzman: A motivational speaker and digital marketing expert.
- Kakai Bautista as Yaya Ikay: A housekeeper for the Tiu family and Caroline's personal maid.
- Tart Carlos as Patricia "Pato" Bugtong: A former housekeeper for the Tiu family who keeps a dark secret.
- Mitch Valdez as Prudencia
- Isay Alvarez-Seña as Doc Kat: Caroline's therapist.
- Frenchie Dy as Pepper
- Cheska Iñigo as Thea: An executive assistant for Golden Lotus Corporation.
- Olive Isidro as Phoebe
- Karl Gabriel as Bob
- Argel Saycon as Boloy
- Igi Boy Flores as Neco: One of the workers at Cathy's company.
- Matt Evans as Emong: One of the workers at Cathy's company.
- Anna Luna as Kida: One of the workers at Cathy's company.
- Peewee O' Hara as Yaya Lyn: Annie's personal maid.
- Shanaia Gomez as Kara
- Karen Bordador as Margaret
- Emmanuelle Vera as Geline: Carlo's lover.
- Jake Ejercito as Aldrich Co: A businessman whom Irene is interested.
- Cris Villanueva as Gilbert "Ibe" Bautista: A former engineer who resides in La Sinfonia.
- Aya Fernandez as Carissa: A female chef and Charleston's ex-girlfriend.
- Freddie Webb as Dr. John Capistrano: An ophthalmologist who helped Lola Nene regain her eyesight.
- Raul Montesa as Toni Alumahan: A retired investigator.
- Ayen Munji-Laurel as Charry Tanhueco: Stephen's mother.
- Audie Gemora as Brian Tanhueco: Stephen's father.
- Floyd Tena as Atty. Philip San Diego: Sherwin's lawyer.
- Kuya Manzano as Ahmed Al Jufalli: Annie's ex-husband.
- Luis Manzano as a restaurant waiter.
- Cloud Ramos
- Clyde Cruz as Chris
- Lotlot Bustamante
- Nicole Cordoves as one of the employees at Golden Lotus Corporation.
- Von Lopez
- RJ Ledesma as Atty. Joey
- John Adajar as Paulo
- Cassandra Chan
- Toni Gonzaga

== Production ==
Principal photography commenced in August 2023, and concluded in April 2024.

== Music ==
The theme song of Can't Buy Me Love is a 2023 version of "You'll Be Safe Here" performed by Moira Dela Torre. A re-recorded version of "You'll Be Safe Here" by Rico Blanco is also featured in the series. Two original songs also include "Autumn" by Ben&Ben and Belle Mariano, and "Iyo" by Darren Espanto.

The musical score for the series was composed by Jessie Lasaten.

== Release ==
Can't Buy Me Love streamed with advanced episodes first on Netflix on October 13, 2023, and on iWantTFC on the following day, before releasing on free-to-air television platforms on October 16, 2023.

=== Reruns ===
It began airing reruns on ALLTV/Kapamilya Channel's Kapamilya Gold afternoon block, Kapamilya Online Live, and A2Z's Zuper Hapon on March 23 to October 2, 2026, replacing the reruns of Lavender Fields.

== Reception ==
=== Online viewership ===
Can't Buy Me Love was a success upon its premiere, garnering 454,413 concurrent live viewers on YouTube, and soared as the number-one most watched series on Netflix Philippines.

=== Ratings ===
According to Kantar Media, the series received a television ratings of 11.6%, beating its rival program Love Before Sunrise with 9.7%. According to AGB Neilsen, the pilot episode of the series generated 8.0% over its rival Love Before Sunrise with 7.1%.
