= Star Cinema =

Philippine film and television production company and film distributor

ABS-CBN Film Productions, Inc.
- The current logo of Star Cinema used since June 3, 2022.
- Trade name: Star Cinema
- Formerly: Star Cinema Productions, Inc. (1993–2003)
- Type: Subsidiary
- Industry: Film production and distribution
- Predecessors: Vanguard Films (1982–1989); Vision Films (1989–1993)
- Founded: May 8, 1993; 33 years ago
- Founder: Charo Santos-Concio; Malou N. Santos
- Headquarters: ELJ Communications Center, Eugenio Lopez Street, Diliman, Quezon City, Metro Manila, Philippines
- Area served: Worldwide
- Key people: Kriz Gazmen (company head, ABS-CBN Films); Olivia Lamasan (consultant); Carlo L. Katigbak (Executive producer and CEO; ABS-CBN Corporation)
- Products: Home videos; Motion pictures; Music recordings; Screenplays; Television series
- Services: Film and television production, film distribution, home video distribution, film licensing
- Revenue: ₱ 3. billion (FY 2022)
- Parent: ABS-CBN Corporation
- Divisions: Black Sheep Productions; Star Cinema Productions; Star Creatives Television; Star Home Video; Star Music
- Website: starcinema.abs-cbn.com

ABS-CBN Film Productions, Inc., doing business as Star Cinema, is a Filipino film studio based in Quezon City. Star Cinema is owned by the Filipino media and entertainment conglomerate ABS-CBN Corporation and was incorporated on May 8, 1993, as Star Cinema Productions, Inc. with the help of Lily Monteverde and Regal Films. Since its inception, Star Cinema has produced some of the highest-grossing Filipino films of all time. Star Cinema has also been involved in the production of some TV series shown on the ABS-CBN television network, with Pangako Sa 'Yo in 2000 as its initial production.

== History ==
=== Vanguard Films (1982–1989) ===
Vanguard Films was formed in 1983. It was headed by Simon Ongpin and Charo Santos-Concio.

In 1985, the serial komiks by Nerissa Cabral, Hindi Nahahati ang Langit was adapted into a film, and it stars Christopher de Leon, Lorna Tolentino, Edu Manzano, and Dina Bonnevie. The said film was directed by Mike de Leon.

=== Vision Films (1989–1993) ===
In 1989, Santos-Concio formed Vision Films, operated independently from ABS-CBN and Regal Films. The first film offering of the company was Kailan Mahuhugasan ang Kasalanan? (1989), directed by Lino Brocka. Throughout its short existence, all of the films produced by Vision Films are dramas based on radio serials and action thrillers based on true stories or comics.

In 1990, three films were released: Nagsimula sa Puso, Kapag Langit ang Humatol, and Bala at Rosaryo. The former two were adapted from radio dramas that were serialized via DZRH-AM, while the latter was adapted from a comic serial. In 1991, action thriller Ganti ng Api and crime thriller melodrama Kailan Ka Magiging Akin were released. Between 1992 and 1993, no films were produced as Vision Films was absorbed into Star Cinema.

=== Star Cinema (1993–present) ===
Star Cinema's 20th anniversary logo (May 2013 – December 2014)

Star Cinema was founded on May 8, 1993, with producer Simon C. Ongpin becoming the studio's managing director. Even though it was still a new player in the film industry at that time, Star Cinema position itself to be a major competitor of big film studios like Viva Films and Regal Films. The studio collaborated with Regal Films for its first-ever film production: Ronquillo: Tubong Cavite, Laking Tondo (1993), an action film starring Bong Revilla and Sheryl Cruz. Its strategies are to reflect the viewer's current taste and trends with a string of films targeted to mainstream viewers with film genres ranging from action, drama, comedy, horror, and fantasy. In 1995, Santos-Concio's sister Malou N. Santos succeeded Ongpin as managing director of Star Cinema. The films of Star Cinema in the 1990s have been well received with some earning critical acclaim with films like May Minamahal (1993), Maalaala Mo Kaya: The Movie (1994), Madrasta (1996), Magic Temple (1996), and Bata, Bata… Pa'no Ka Ginawa? (1998).

Star Cinema logo used from December 25 2014 to May 5 2018.

The 1990s also saw the pioneering works of the studio by integrating computer-generated images, special effects and special makeup and prosthetics on some of its films like Patayin sa Sindak si Barbara (1995), Magic Temple (1996), Kokey (1997), Magandang Hatinggabi (1998), Hiling (1998), and Puso ng Pasko (1998) among others. Other notable works were live-action adaptations of popular Japanese anime series like Sarah... Ang Munting Prinsesa (1995) and Cedie (1996), in turn, based on children's novels by English playwright and author Frances Hodgson Burnett, which incorporates stylish production designs and costumes and were shot abroad. From September 1997 to July 1999, former Viva Films executive Eric Cuatico Jr. briefly served as co-managing director of the studio alongside Santos.

Star Cinema logo used from May 6 2018 to June 2 2022.

Star Cinema also produced a film adaptations of ABS-CBN's successful TV series like Mara Clara: The Movie, released in 1996 and Mula sa Puso: The Movie, Wansapanataym: The Movie, and Esperanza: The Movie are released in 1999. In 1997, 1998, and 2000, Star Cinema produced Goodbye America, Legacy, and Doomsdayer respectively under the banner of Star Pacific Cinema in an attempt to penetrate the Hollywood B-movie market.

The 2000s has been the most successful time for Star Cinema in terms of box office gross. Most of the all-time highest-grossing films in the history of the Philippines are either produced or co-produced by Star Cinema as reported by Box Office Mojo. In 2002, Star Cinema together with Unitel Pictures released the Filipino-American film American Adobo with mixed reviews in the United States. In late 2007, Sky Films, a distribution company previously acquired by ABS-CBN in 2001, was merged with Star Cinema. In 2010, Star Cinema co-financed and released RPG Metanoia, the first 3D computer-animated Filipino film in history. In 2013, Star Cinema co-financed and released Erik Matti's On the Job with mixed to positive reviews abroad. Star Cinema films that were well received by critics in this period were Anak (2000), Tanging Yaman (2000), Bagong Buwan (2001), Dekada '70 (2002), Nasaan Ka Man (2005), Kasal, Kasali, Kasalo (2006), In My Life (2009) and On the Job (2013).

== Star Creatives Television ==
Star Creatives Television
- Logo used since 2019.
- Formerly: Star Television (1997–2014)
- Type: Division
- Industry: Television production Film production
- Genre: Philippine telenovelas
- Founded: 1997
- Founder: Malou N. Santos
- Headquarters: ABS-CBN Broadcasting Center, Sgt. Esguerra Avenue corner Mother Ignacia Street, Diliman, Quezon City, Metro Manila, Philippines
- Area served: Worldwide
- Key people: Olivia M. Lamasan; Henry King Quitain; Lourdes de Guzman; Ginny Monteagudo-Ocampo (formerly); Roda Catolico-Dela Cerna (formerly)
- Products: Television programs Film production Content provider
- Owner: ABS-CBN Corporation
- Parent: Star Cinema; ABS-CBN Studios
- Divisions: Star Creatives Digital

In 1997, Star Cinema started its television production venture by producing the drama Esperanza for the now-defunct ABS-CBN television network with the studio coining the term "teleserye" to promote the series. Its ratings peaked at 64.9% on its finale episode, marking the highest rating for any series finale episode on Philippine television. Pangako Sa 'Yo also became popular abroad, notably across Africa and Asia. It was followed by another successful series Kay Tagal Kang Hinintay (2002) and It Might Be You (2003).

Logo that was used in 2014 when it began identify themselves to distinguish from Dreamscape Entertainment, another drama production unit of ABS-CBN Studios.

In 2008, its most expensive television production Lobo (known internationally as She Wolf) received the Banff World Media Festival for best telenovela program and earned Angel Locsin an International Emmy Awards nomination for performance by a female actor - the country's first overall acting nomination ever on the awards show. Sana Maulit Muli (2008) also gained a following in Taiwan when it was dubbed in Taiwanese Minnan. Kahit Isang Saglit (2008) became a finalist in the 37th International Emmy Awards. Its 2010 production Magkaribal became a finalist to the 2011 New York International Independent Film and Video Festival for best telenovela. Budoy (2011) is also a finalist to the 2013 New York Festivals International Television and Film Awards. Bridges of Love (2015) is the first Philippine telenovela to be released in Latin American countries including Peru. Soap operas produced by Star Creatives had been subtitled and dubbed to several languages including English, Spanish, Portuguese, Turkish, Khmer, Indonesian, Malay, Mandarin and French and most notably those that are targeted to Asia Pacific, Africa and Latin America. One of the programs dubbed in French is Kay Tagal Kang Hinintay which will cater to French-speaking audience in Africa and Europe. Star Cinema has also produced TV promos, spots and specials for the ABS-CBN network. In 2011, Star Cinema spent ₱12 million for the Philippine National Anthem video clip of ABS-CBN network.

== Star Home Video ==
Star Home Video
- Formerly: Star Records Video (2003–2007)
- Type: Division
- Industry: Home entertainment
- Founded: 2003; 23 years ago
- Headquarters: ABS-CBN Broadcasting Center, Sgt. Esguerra Avenue corner Mother Ignacia Street, Diliman, Quezon City, Metro Manila, Philippines
- Area served: Worldwide
- Key people: Kriz Gazmen (head of division)
- Products: Home video releases
- Services: Home videos; Digital distribution
- Owner: ABS-CBN Corporation
- Parent: Star Cinema

Star Home Video is the home video and DVD distribution arm of ABS-CBN Film Productions Inc. It is the exclusive home video distributor of the Star Cinema film library, as well as ABS-CBN programs, and karaoke CDs.

== Film distribution ==
Star Cinema distributes all of its films as well as movies produced by other production companies. In 2015, Star Cinema released the Cinema One Originals film That Thing Called Tadhana with critical and box office success. The film went on to gross over ₱134 million against its budget of only two-million pesos.

== List of television productions ==
- Esperanza (1997–1999)
- Sa Sandaling Kailangan Mo Ako (1998–1999) Credited as a Star Cinema Production
- Labs Ko si Babe (1999–2000)
- Pangako sa 'Yo (2000–2002) - Credited as a Star Cinema Production
- Maalaala Mo Kaya (2001–2018)
- Recuerdo de Amor (2001–2003)
- Kay Tagal Kang Hinintay (2002–2003) Credited as a Star Cinema Production
- Bituin (2002–2003)
- Darating ang Umaga (2003) Credited as a Star Cinema Production
- Sana'y Wala Nang Wakas (2003–2004) Credited as a Star Cinema Production
- Basta't Kasama Kita (2003–2004) Credited as a Star Cinema Production
- It Might Be You (2003–2004) Credited as a Star Cinema Production
- Marina (2004)
- Sarah the Teen Princess (2004)
- Mangarap Ka (2004)
- Krystala (2004–2005)
- Hiram (2004–2005)
- Spirits (2004–2005)
- Ikaw ang Lahat sa Akin (2005)
- Kampanerang Kuba (2005)
- Panday (2005–2006)
- Sa Piling Mo (2006)
- Maging Sino Ka Man (2006–2007)
- Ysabella (2007–2008)
- Maging Sino Ka Man: Ang Pagbabalik (2007–2008)
- Kahit Isang Saglit (2008)
- Lobo (2008)
- Dahil May Isang Ikaw (2009–2010)
- Magkaribal (2010)
- Imortal (2010–2011)
- Juanita Banana (2010–2011)
- Guns and Roses (2011)
- Maria La Del Barrio (2011–2012)
- Reputasyon (2011–2012)
- E-Boy (2012)
- Princess and I (2012–2013)
- Apoy sa Dagat (2013)
- Got to Believe (2013–2014)
- The Legal Wife (2014)
- Forevermore (2014–2015)
- Bridges of Love (2015)
- Pangako sa 'Yo (2015-2016)
- You're My Home (2015-2016)
- Dolce Amore (2016)
- The Story of Us (2016)
- A Love to Last (2017)
- La Luna Sangre (2017–2018)
- Pusong Ligaw (2017)
- Sana Dalawa ang Puso (2018)
- Bagani (2018)
- Ngayon at Kailanman (2018–2019)
- Make It with You (2020)
- The House Arrest of Us (2020 – 2021) - Credited as a Star Cinema production
- Init sa Magdamag (2021)
- He's Into Her (2021 – 2022) - Credited as a Star Cinema production
- Hello, Heart (2021–2022)
- My Papa Pi (2022)
- Tara, G! (2022)
- A Family Affair (2022)
- The Iron Heart (2022 - 2023)
- Can't Buy Me Love (2023 - 2024)
- Incognito (2025)
- It's Okay to Not Be Okay (2025)
- The Secrets of Hotel 88 (2026)
- The Loyalty Game (2026)
- Feng Shui: Curse Reborn
