= Mimiyuuuh =

Filipino vlogger (born 1996)

- Born: Jeremy Lomibao Sancebuche; November 11, 1996 (age 29); Parañaque, Metro Manila, Philippines
- Other names: Local Jeje Girl; Mimi
- Education: De La Salle–College of Saint Benilde (AB)
- Occupations: Vlogger; YouTuber

YouTube information
- Channel: mimiyuuuh
- Years active: 2019–present
- Genres: vlogging; comedy; endorsing
- Subscribers: 4.48 million
- Views: 271 million
- Last updated: 4 August 2026

Jeremy Lomibao Sancebuche (born November 11, 1996), known professionally as Mimiyuuuh or simply Mimi, is a Filipino YouTuber, social media personality, and fashion designer. Sancebuche initially gained popularity after posting a video lip syncing to the song "Dalaga" by ALLMO$T, which was part of a viral video challenge. The video went viral and motivated the creation of own versions of many local celebrities.

== Early life ==
Mimiyuuuh was raised in Baclaran, Parañaque, just south of Manila, Philippines; Mimiyuuuh's parents sold clothes in the said area. Mimiyuuuh attended De La Salle–College of Saint Benilde in Manila, taking up a bachelor's degree in Fashion Design and Merchandising, and also worked as a student assistant in the aforementioned school.

== Career ==
Mimiyuuuh initially made mukbang videos on YouTube before becoming popular in 2019, after participating in the "Dalagang Pilipina" online challenge. After going viral, Mimiyuuuh's YouTube channel would surpass one million subscribers in just six months. Outside of YouTube, Mimiyuuuh has appeared in several TV shows in the Philippines. Mimiyuuuh later became a host at the ABS-CBN Ball in 2019, interviewing artists on the red carpet. That same year, Mimiyuuuh would claim their first award as a vlogger at the E! Pop Gala. Mimiyuuuh is the second Filipino celebrity to have their voice featured on the Waze app, and later appeared in a Pepsi Philippines TV commercial. Currently, Mimiyuuuh is a brand ambassador for Lazada in the Philippines.

Mimiyuuuh owns the clothing brand Fangs, a contemporary street style brand featuring Mimiyuuuh's own designs. Mimiyuuuh has collaborated with celebrity vloggers like Alex Gonzaga, Rufa Mae Quinto, Moira Dela Torre, Erich Gonzales, The Gold Squad (Seth Fedelin, Andrea Brillantes, Francine Diaz, Kyle Echarri), Heart Evangelista, Sarah Geronimo, Pia Wurtzbach and Bea Alonzo. Mimiyuuuh had also created traditional and graphic art. In November 2019, Mimi worked as a commercial model for the Italian luxury brand, Off-White after featuring the brand in one of their vlogs with Alex Gonzaga along with his photoshoot with a local fashion magazine, Preview.

On March 27, 2020, Mimiyuuuh hosted an online zumba session to help raise funds for charity; the funds would be donated to Caritas Manila and Save San Roque.

A video of Mimiyuuuh dancing to Gagong Rapper's song "Kabet" was published on the video-sharing platform TikTok on August 21, 2020; the internet sensation went viral again after posting the dance video. The viral video was part of the "It really hurts" challenge.

On September 25, 2020, independent record label O/C Records revealed that internet superstar Mimiyuuuh will be joining its roster of talent. The Kean Cipriano-led record label invited Mimiyuuuh to the business on social media. Six days later, on October 1, 2020, Mimiyuuuh released his debut single "DYWB (Drink Your Water Bitch)" under O/C Records.

== Personal life ==
Mimiyuuuh has since bought a house for his family due to his popularity. A tour vlog of the new house was published on YouTube on October 27, 2020. In a vlog posted in May 2021, Mimiyuuuh revealed that his parents suffered from COVID-19.

== Discography ==
- 2020: DYWB (Drink Your Water Bitch)

== Filmography ==
=== Television ===
Year	Title	Role	Ref.
2019	Gandang Gabi, Vice!	Guest	
2019	Magandang Buhay	Guest	
2020	Eat Bulaga	Guest	

=== Film ===
Year	Title	Role	Ref.
2019	The Mall, The Merrier	Moira / Moises Molina	

== Accolades ==
Year	Award-giving Body	Category	Notable Works	Result	Ref.
2019	2019 E! Pop Gala	Trending of the Year award		Won	
2020	CICP Spotlight Awards	Creator of the Year		Won	
2021	PUSH Awards 2020	PUSH Trending TikToker		Won	
