= List of Kadenang Ginto episodes =

Kadenang Ginto (lit. 'Golden Chain'/English: The Heiress) is a 2018 Philippine drama television series starring Francine Diaz, Andrea Brillantes, Beauty Gonzalez, Albert Martinez, Dimples Romana, Adrian Alandy and Richard Yap. The series premiered on ABS-CBN's Kapamilya Gold afternoon block and worldwide via The Filipino Channel from October 8, 2018 to February 7, 2020, replacing Asintado.

== Series overview ==
Season	Episodes	Originally released	
Season	Episodes	First released	Last released
1	105	October 8, 2018	March 1, 2019
2	90	March 4, 2019	July 9, 2019
3	153	July 10, 2019	February 7, 2020

== Episodes ==
=== Season 1 (2018–19) ===
No. overall	No. in season	Title	Original release date	Kantar Media Ratings (nationwide)
1	1	"Pangako (Promise)"	October 8, 2018	16.2%
2	2	"Kabiguan (Failure)"	October 9, 2018	15.1%
3	3	"Lamat (Flaw)"	October 10, 2018	14.9%
4	4	"Kasal (Marriage)"	October 11, 2018	14.5%
5	5	"Damayan"	October 12, 2018	17.1%
6	6	"Proposal"	October 15, 2018	15.3%
7	7	"Preparasyon (Preparation)"	October 16, 2018	15.2%
8	8	"Katuparan (Fulfillment)"	October 17, 2018	15.0%
9	9	"Unang Paghaharap (First Meeting)"	October 18, 2018	15.8%
10	10	"Cassie at Marga (Cassie and Marga)"	October 19, 2018	15.9%
11	11	"Paghaharap (Confrontation)"	October 22, 2018	18.2%
12	12	"Resulta (Result)"	October 23, 2018	16.5%
13	13	"Selebrasyon (Celebration)"	October 24, 2018	17.3%
14	14	"Pagtitimpi (Holding Back)"	October 25, 2018	19.8%
15	15	"Pagtatanggol (Defense)"	October 26, 2018	18.1%
16	16	"Bonding"	October 29, 2018	16.3%
17	17	"Brainwash"	October 30, 2018	18.2%
18	18	"Sabotahe (Sabotage)"	October 31, 2018	17.2%
19	19	"Maxwell FS"	November 1, 2018	15.3%
20	20	"Rampa (Ramp)"	November 2, 2018	18.0%
21	21	"Takas (Escape)"	November 5, 2018	18.0%
22	22	"House Party"	November 6, 2018	18.2%
23	23	"Pangaral (Award)"	November 7, 2018	16.0%
24	24	"Ibang Mundo (Different World)"	November 8, 2018	18.4%
25	25	"Pagpapanggap (Impersonation)"	November 9, 2018	18.9%
26	26	"Bisto (Caught)"	November 12, 2018	16.9%
27	27	"Lipat Mansyon (Mansion Move)"	November 13, 2018	17.5%
28	28	"Selos (Jealous)"	November 14, 2018	17.4%
29	29	"Motibo (Motive)"	November 15, 2018	17.2%
30	30	"Pagbabago (Change)"	November 16, 2018	16.5%
31	31	"Plano (Plan)"	November 19, 2018	16.6%
32	32	"Pagsuway (Disobedience)"	November 20, 2018	17.1%
33	33	"Tiwala (Trust)"	November 21, 2018	18.5%
34	34	"Relayson (Relationship)"	November 22, 2018	14.8%
35	35	"Dragon War"	November 23, 2018	16.2%
36	36	"Panggap (Pretend)"	November 26, 2018	14.6%
37	37	"Pakitang Tao (Show Off)"	November 27, 2018	15.1%
38	38	"Aksidente (Accident)"	November 28, 2018	15.3%
39	39	"Salo Salo (Party)"	November 29, 2018	13.8%
40	40	"Masamang Balak (Bad Intention)"	November 30, 2018	14.9%
41	41	"Pagtulong (Helping)"	December 3, 2018	14.5%
42	42	"Maling Hinala (Wrong Suspicion)"	December 4, 2018	13.5%
43	43	"Napaniwala (Convinced)"	December 5, 2018	13.5%
44	44	"Desisyon (Decision)"	December 6, 2018	15.1%
45	45	"Pinaglalayo (Separated)"	December 7, 2018	13.9%
46	46	"Maxwell Fair"	December 10, 2018	15.1%
47	47	"Panalo (Win)"	December 11, 2018	14.4%
48	48	"Number 1"	December 12, 2018	14.6%
49	49	"Sleepover"	December 13, 2018	13.3%
50	50	"Tulakan (Pushing)"	December 14, 2018	15.4%
51	51	"Cheater"	December 17, 2018	16.5%
52	52	"Traydor (Traitor)"	December 18, 2018	15.4%
53	53	"Trapped"	December 19, 2018	16.0%
54	54	"Ebidensiya (Evidence)"	December 20, 2018	16.4%
55	55	"Labanan (Battle)"	December 21, 2018	16.5%
56	56	"Paninindigan (Stance)"	December 24, 2018	13.5%
57	57	"Paghahanda (Preparation)"	December 25, 2018	11.6%
58	58	"Panganib (Danger)"	December 26, 2018	14.2%
59	59	"Anak sa Pagkakasala (Child in Guilt)"	December 27, 2018	13.4%
60	60	"Pagbabalik ng Nakaraan (Return of the Past)"	December 28, 2018	16.5%
61	61	"Hinala (Suspicion)"	December 31, 2018	12.7%
62	62	"Konprontasyon (Confrontation)"	January 1, 2019	14.5%
63	63	"Banta (Threat)"	January 2, 2019	17.2%
64	64	"Pagkukrus ng Landas (Cross of Path)"	January 3, 2019	15.8%
65	65	"Planong Paglayo (Plan of Separation)"	January 4, 2019	16.5%
66	66	"Mensahe (Message)"	January 7, 2019	13.8%
67	67	"Tutol (Against)"	January 8, 2019	15.5%
68	68	"Testigo (Witness)"	January 9, 2019	16.8%
69	69	"Pagkukunwari"	January 10, 2019	17.6%
70	70	"Pagkikita (Meeting)"	January 11, 2019	16.4%
71	71	"Pagtitiwala (Confidence)"	January 14, 2019	14.9%
72	72	"Paghahanap (Searching)"	January 15, 2019	14.4%
73	73	"Pagtataka (Wondering)"	January 16, 2019	14.3%
74	74	"Kaguluhan (Trouble)"	January 17, 2019	14.8%
75	75	"Pagbabati"	January 18, 2019	14.7%
76	76	"Kaarawan (Birthday)"	January 21, 2019	16.8%
77	77	"Kidnap"	January 22, 2019	17.7%
78	78	"Totoong Mondragon (True Mondragon)"	January 23, 2019	18.2%
79	79	"Rescue"	January 24, 2019	17.4%
80	80	"Pag-amin (Confession)"	January 25, 2019	18.6%
81	81	"Bangungot ng Nakaraan (Nightmare of the Past)"	January 28, 2019	17.0%
82	82	"Double Celebration"	January 29, 2019	16.1%
83	83	"Tuloy ang Laban (The Battle Continues)"	January 30, 2019	16.6%
84	84	"New Evidence"	January 31, 2019	15.9%
85	85	"Hindi na Magpapaapi (No More Oppression)"	February 1, 2019	17.9%
86	86	"Sukdulan (Extreme)"	February 4, 2019	19.4%
87	87	"Warning"	February 5, 2019	19.7%
88	88	"Nagbago (Changed)"	February 6, 2019	16.8%
89	89	"Palitan (Replace)"	February 7, 2019	19.0%
90	90	"Pagtakpan (Cover Up)"	February 8, 2019	19.1%
91	91	"Kulong (Jailed)"	February 11, 2019	19.0%
92	92	"Paghihinala (Suspicion)"	February 12, 2019	18.9%
93	93	"Patalsikin (Expel)"	February 13, 2019	17.3%
94	94	"Arestado (Arrested)"	February 14, 2019	17.6%
95	95	"Kasabwat (Accomplice)"	February 15, 2019	19.0%
96	96	"DNA Result"	February 18, 2019	19.0%
97	97	"Family Outing"	February 19, 2019	18.4%
98	98	"Pakiusap (Plea)"	February 20, 2019	17.1%
99	99	"Paglaya (Release)"	February 21, 2019	18.8%
100	100	"Paglayo (Detachment)"	February 22, 2019	19.9%
101	101	"Robert Mondragon"	February 25, 2019	19.3%
102	102	"Search Operation"	February 26, 2019	18.1%
103	103	"Paggunita (Commemoration)"	February 27, 2019	18.6%
104	104	"Paalam Robert (Goodbye Robert)"	February 28, 2019	17.3%
105	105	"Last Will"	March 1, 2019	18.2%

=== Season 2 (2019) ===
No. overall	No. in season	Title	Original release date	Kantar Media Ratings (nationwide)
106	1	"The Golden Truth"	March 4, 2019	18.5%
107	2	"Magkapatid (Siblings)"	March 5, 2019	18.5%
108	3	"Pag-aresto (Arrest)"	March 6, 2019	17.2%
109	4	"Bartolome sa Mansyon (Bartolome in the Mansion)"	March 7, 2019	18.8%
110	5	"Daniela Rules"	March 8, 2019	16.7%
111	6	"Lalaban (Fighting)"	March 11, 2019	19.7%
112	7	"Curfew"	March 12, 2019	19.0%
113	8	"Hadlang (Barrier)"	March 13, 2019	18.6%
114	9	"Banggaan (Clash)"	March 14, 2019	21.2%
115	10	"Matibay (Sturdy)"	March 15, 2019	20.5%
116	11	"Ensayo (Exercise)"	March 18, 2019	23.5%
117	12	"Protection Order"	March 19, 2019	24.0%
118	13	"Huli sa Akto (Caught in the Act)"	March 20, 2019	22.1%
119	14	"Hatian sa Mansyon (Sharing in the Mansion)"	March 21, 2019	23.9%
120	15	"Hearing"	March 22, 2019	22.4%
121	16	"Hamon (Challenge)"	March 25, 2019	23.5%
122	17	"Good News"	March 26, 2019	22.9%
123	18	"Paglaya ni Romina (The Release of Romina)"	March 27, 2019	24.2%
124	19	"Walang Atrasan (No Turning Back)"	March 28, 2019	26.9%
125	20	"Pagbangon (Rise)"	March 29, 2019	25.4%
126	21	"Bagsik ni Romina (Fierceness of Romina)"	April 1, 2019	24.6%
127	22	"Tuso (Cunning)"	April 2, 2019	24.3%
128	23	"Ganti ng Api (Revenge of the Oppressed)"	April 3, 2019	25.3%
129	24	"Paghahanap ng Ebidensya (Finding the Evidence)"	April 4, 2019	24.6%
130	25	"Paglipat (Transfer)"	April 5, 2019	26.2%
131	26	"Diskarte (Strategy)"	April 8, 2019	24.5%
132	27	"Moving Up"	April 9, 2019	26.5%
133	28	"Nagaapoy na Galit (Burning with Anger)"	April 10, 2019	25.2%
134	29	"Mrs Mondragon"	April 11, 2019	25.9%
135	30	"Tagumpay (Success)"	April 12, 2019	25.7%
136	31	"Summer Job"	April 15, 2019	25.7%
137	32	"Cufflink"	April 16, 2019	26.0%
138	33	"Higanti (Revenge)"	April 17, 2019	25.8%
139	34	"Nasaan Ka Alvin (Where are you Alvin)"	April 22, 2019	25.6%
140	35	"Resbak (Retaliation)"	April 23, 2019	27.1%
141	36	"Pagtatapat (Confession)"	April 24, 2019	25.8%
142	37	"Unahan (Race)"	April 25, 2019	23.3%
143	38	"Natuklasan (Discovered)"	April 26, 2019	24.6%
144	39	"3rd Wheel"	April 29, 2019	26.1%
145	40	"Pagseselos (Jealousy)"	April 30, 2019	25.3%
146	41	"Rebelasyon (Revelation)"	May 1, 2019	25.2%
147	42	"Kasalanan ng Kahapon (Fault of the Past)"	May 2, 2019	24.8%
148	43	"Pagbubunyag (Disclosure)"	May 3, 2019	26.0%
149	44	"Kabayaran (Compensation)"	May 6, 2019	27.1%
150	45	"Akusasyon (Accusation)"	May 7, 2019	27.1%
151	46	"Amanos (Quits)"	May 8, 2019	26.2%
152	47	"Digital Karma"	May 9, 2019	26.5%
153	48	"Mothers Day"	May 10, 2019	24.8%
154	49	"Baking Clash"	May 13, 2019	22.2%
155	50	"Not Guilty"	May 14, 2019	25.8%
156	51	"Batas ni Romina (Law of Romina)"	May 15, 2019	25.4%
157	52	"Pagbaliktad (Reversal)"	May 16, 2019	24.9%
158	53	"Dream Maker"	May 17, 2019	26.2%
159	54	"Pag-asa (Hope)"	May 20, 2019	25.3%
160	55	"Offer"	May 21, 2019	24.3%
161	56	"Bistado (Busted)"	May 22, 2019	23.6%
162	57	"Music Fest"	May 23, 2019	25.3%
163	58	"Habulan (Chase)"	May 24, 2019	24.0%
164	59	"It's a Yes"	May 27, 2019	26.5%
165	60	"Hanapan (Search)"	May 28, 2019	23.5%
166	61	"Manindigan (Stand Uo)"	May 29, 2019	25.6%
167	62	"Pagsagip (Rescue)"	May 30, 2019	26.8%
168	63	"Pagtatakip (Cover Up)"	May 31, 2019	23.9%
169	64	"Pagkawala (Loss)"	June 3, 2019	23.8%
170	65	"Tawag (Call)"	June 4, 2019	22.5%
171	66	"Pananakot (Intimidation)"	June 5, 2019	23.4%
172	67	"Lumaban (Fight)"	June 6, 2019	21.7%
173	68	"Sariling Multo (Own Ghost)"	June 7, 2019	23.0%
174	69	"Pagbangga (Collision)"	June 10, 2019	22.8%
175	70	"Panalangin (Prayer)"	June 11, 2019	23.7%
176	71	"Sinadya (Intentional)"	June 12, 2019	25.4%
177	72	"Kadugo"	June 13, 2019	24.0%
178	73	"Pigilan (Prevent)"	June 14, 2019	24.6%
179	74	"Pagkakautang (Indebtness)"	June 17, 2019	24.2%
180	75	"Paniningil (Billing)"	June 18, 2019	24.0%
181	76	"Pagbabagong Loob"	June 19, 2019	25.0%
182	77	"Blood Donor"	June 20, 2019	22.7%
183	78	"Alinlangan (Doubt)"	June 21, 2019	24.8%
184	79	"Dugong Mondragon (Blood of a Mondragon)"	June 24, 2019	24.1%
185	80	"Nasaan Ka Daniela (Where are you Daniela)"	June 25, 2019	22.4%
186	81	"Golden Blood"	June 26, 2019	24.0%
187	82	"Natuklasang Lihim (Discovered Secret)"	June 27, 2019	24.1%
188	83	"Buwis Buhay (Life Threatening)"	June 28, 2019	24.6%
189	84	"Pagluluksa (Suffering)"	July 1, 2019	25.5%
190	85	"Hatian (Splitting)"	July 2, 2019	23.5%
191	86	"Paglipat Bahay (House Move)"	July 3, 2019	23.5%
192	87	"Patibong (Trap)"	July 4, 2019	25.6%
193	88	"Farewell Camila"	July 5, 2019	25.0%
194	89	"Bagong Simula (New Start)"	July 8, 2019	23.5%
195	90	"Petisyon (Petition)"	July 9, 2019	22.6%

=== Season 3 (2019–20) ===
No. overall	No. in season	Title	Original release date	Kantar Media Ratings (nationwide)
196	1	"Pagdating ng Leon (Arrival of Leon)"	July 10, 2019	26.0%
197	2	"Hindi Susuko (Not Going to Give Up)"	July 11, 2019	25.1%
198	3	"Solusyon (Solution)"	July 12, 2019	25.2%
199	4	"Pagbawi (Recovery)"	July 15, 2019	24.2%
200	5	"Romina at Leon (Romina and Leon)"	July 16, 2019	25.0%
201	6	"Imbestigasyon (Investigation)"	July 17, 2019	24.9%
202	7	"Seafood Expo"	July 18, 2019	23.2%
203	8	"Labanan ng Sardinas (Battle of the Sardines)"	July 19, 2019	25.7%
204	9	"Kinalaman (Relation)"	July 22, 2019	18.6%
205	10	"Hulihin (Apprehend)"	July 23, 2019	23.8%
206	11	"Kasuhan (Charge)"	July 24, 2019	23.0%
207	12	"Pagtakas (Escape)"	July 25, 2019	23.4%
208	13	"Pagalingan (Recovery)"	July 26, 2019	24.9%
209	14	"Protektahan (Protect)"	July 29, 2019	25.2%
210	15	"Paghuli Kay Hector (Hector's Arrest)"	July 30, 2019	25.0%
211	16	"Eskandalo (Scandal)"	July 31, 2019	22.7%
212	17	"Galit ni Romina (Romina's Anger)"	August 1, 2019	23.9%
213	18	"Dakpin si Daniela (Arrest Daniela)"	August 2, 2019	25.8%
214	19	"Sabwatan (Conspiracy)"	August 5, 2019	22.6%
215	20	"Itago (Hide)"	August 6, 2019	22.6%
216	21	"Pagpuslit (Smuggling)"	August 7, 2019	21.5%
217	22	"Ipagtanggol (Defend)"	August 8, 2019	21.7%
218	23	"Pagsunod (Compliance)"	August 9, 2019	23.3%
219	24	"Patigilin (Stop)"	August 12, 2019	23.1%
220	25	"Pagdakip (Catch)"	August 13, 2019	20.9%
221	26	"Pagbantaan (Threaten)"	August 14, 2019	21.4%
222	27	"Pagsabog (Explosion)"	August 15, 2019	21.1%
223	28	"Pagkakasira (Destruction)"	August 16, 2019	21.0%
224	29	"Matatag (Sturdy)"	August 19, 2019	24.0%
225	30	"Pagsisimula (Start)"	August 20, 2019	21.2%
226	31	"Karamay (Sympathy)"	August 21, 2019	25.1%
227	32	"Nagkabalikan (Back Together)"	August 22, 2019	22.9%
228	33	"Peligro (Danger)"	August 23, 2019	22.8%
229	34	"Pagbintangan (Accusation)"	August 26, 2019	23.9%
230	35	"Patunayan (Prove)"	August 27, 2019	23.0%
231	36	"Koneksyon (Connection)"	August 28, 2019	23.5%
232	37	"Trial"	August 29, 2019	21.7%
233	38	"Anay (Termites)"	August 30, 2019	21.6%
234	39	"Pagdududa (Doubtful)"	September 2, 2019	22.9%
235	40	"Pag-angat (Lift Up)"	September 3, 2019	20.6%
236	41	"Pagkalugi (Losses)"	September 4, 2019	22.8%
237	42	"Kumpirmasyon (Confirmation)"	September 5, 2019	24.0%
238	43	"Nalantad na Katotohanan (Exposed Truth)"	September 6, 2019	24.3%
239	44	"Plano ni Leon (Leon's Plan)"	September 9, 2019	22.8%
240	45	"Planado (Planned)"	September 10, 2019	22.0%
241	46	"Sugal (Gamble)"	September 11, 2019	22.8%
242	47	"Checkmate"	September 12, 2019	23.7%
243	48	"Pagbaliktad ng Mundo (Turning the World)"	September 13, 2019	23.7%
244	49	"Dalamhati (Heartache)"	September 16, 2019	23.3%
245	50	"Lihim (Secret)"	September 17, 2019	23.1%
246	51	"Sugurin (Rush)"	September 18, 2019	22.4%
247	52	"Pagkatao (Personality)"	September 19, 2019	N/A
248	53	"Linlang (Trick)"	September 20, 2019	21.7%
249	54	"Sorpresa (Surprise)"	September 23, 2019	23.2%
250	55	"Hinala (Suspicion)"	September 24, 2019	22.7%
251	56	"Senyales (Signs)"	September 25, 2019	21.4%
252	57	"Totoong Pagkatao (Real Personality)"	September 26, 2019	21.8%
253	58	"Pagdusahan (Suffer)"	September 27, 2019	21.5%
254	59	"Misyon (Mission)"	September 30, 2019	20.8%
255	60	"Katibayan (Evidence)"	October 1, 2019	20.8%
256	61	"Gamitan (Use)"	October 2, 2019	18.3%
257	62	"Utang (Debt)"	October 3, 2019	18.4%
258	63	"Kaugnayan (Connection)"	October 4, 2019	18.6%
259	64	"Pagkabisto (Caught)"	October 7, 2019	21.0%
260	65	"Ganti ni Romina (Romina's Revenge)"	October 8, 2019	20.2%
261	66	"Robert is Back"	October 9, 2019	23.3%
262	67	"Survivor"	October 10, 2019	23.4%
263	68	"Eskapo (Getaway)"	October 11, 2019	21.9%
264	69	"Pagdating (Arrival)"	October 14, 2019	21.5%
265	70	"Paghandaan (Prepare)"	October 15, 2019	22.5%
266	71	"Pagtuklas (Find Out)"	October 16, 2019	20.4%
267	72	"Pabuya (Reward)"	October 17, 2019	20.0%
268	73	"Pagbenta (For Sale)"	October 18, 2019	20.7%
269	74	"Birthday Wish"	October 21, 2019	22.1%
270	75	"Kasambahay (Maid)"	October 22, 2019	20.3%
271	76	"Panlilinlang (Deception)"	October 23, 2019	20.6%
272	77	"Hukay (Pit)"	October 24, 2019	20.9%
273	78	"Agaw Buhay (Between Life and Death)"	October 25, 2019	24.9%
274	79	"Welcome Home"	October 28, 2019	20.5%
275	80	"Sumbong (Complaint)"	October 29, 2019	20.2%
276	81	"Ungkatin"	October 30, 2019	21.1%
277	82	"Timbog (Caught)"	October 31, 2019	20.1%
278	83	"Multo ng Kahapon (Ghost of the Past)"	November 1, 2019	18.1%
279	84	"Recorded"	November 4, 2019	19.9%
280	85	"Pagtutuos"	November 5, 2019	20.0%
281	86	"Huli Kay Hector (Caught By Hector)"	November 6, 2019	23.0%
282	87	"Pagbisita (Visit)"	November 7, 2019	20.3%
283	88	"Blackmail"	November 8, 2019	21.7%
284	89	"Kahilingan (Wish)"	November 11, 2019	20.0%
285	90	"Konektado (Connected)"	November 12, 2019	19.3%
286	91	"Natagpuan (Found)"	November 13, 2019	21.5%
287	92	"Pagbunyag (Revelation)"	November 14, 2019	22.5%
288	93	"Naghahanda (Preparing)"	November 15, 2019	22.0%
289	94	"Kagustuhan (Wishes)"	November 18, 2019	20.4%
290	95	"Binalot sa Ginto (Wrapped in Gold)"	November 19, 2019	20.5%
291	96	"Lisanin (Leave)"	November 20, 2019	22.1%
292	97	"Harapin (Face)"	November 21, 2019	20.2%
293	98	"Pagdamay (Empathy)"	November 22, 2019	18.9%
294	99	"Ipaglaban (Fight For)"	November 25, 2019	21.5%
295	100	"Ipaubaya (Let Go)"	November 26, 2019	18.4%
296	101	"Pagsugod"	November 27, 2019	18.2%
297	102	"Bomba (Bomb)"	November 28, 2019	18.9%
298	103	"Ligtas (Safe)"	November 29, 2019	19.0%
299	104	"Pagkakataon (Chance)"	December 2, 2019	16.0%
300	105	"Higpitan (Secure)"	December 3, 2019	16.4%
301	106	"Family Day"	December 4, 2019	14.8%
302	107	"Demolish"	December 5, 2019	16.2%
303	108	"Desidido (Decided)"	December 6, 2019	14.9%
304	109	"Liham (Letter)"	December 9, 2019	16.6%
305	110	"Riot"	December 10, 2019	16.7%
306	111	"Nahuli (Caught)"	December 11, 2019	16.5%
307	112	"Tumakas (Escape)"	December 12, 2019	16.0%
308	113	"Paalam (Farewell)"	December 13, 2019	17.0%
309	114	"Huling Sandali (Last Moment)"	December 16, 2019	18.7%
310	115	"Karapatan (Rights)"	December 17, 2019	15.5%
311	116	"Sindak"	December 18, 2019	16.4%
312	117	"Bihag (Captive)"	December 19, 2019	16.7%
313	118	"Laban Romina (Fight Romina)"	December 20, 2019	15.4%
314	119	"Hiling (Wish)"	December 23, 2019	15.6%
315	120	"Noche Buena"	December 24, 2019	12.7%
316	121	"Pangarap (Dream)"	December 25, 2019	12.0%
317	122	"Matuklasan (Find Out)"	December 26, 2019	15.2%
318	123	"Paaminin (Confess)"	December 27, 2019	13.8%
319	124	"Sikreto ni Daniela (Daniela's Secret)"	December 30, 2019	14.9%
320	125	"Suspetsa (Suspicious)"	December 31, 2019	13.7%
321	126	"Saksi (Witness)"	January 1, 2020	13.3%
322	127	"Bagong Buhay (New Life)"	January 2, 2020	16.9%
323	128	"Ultimatum"	January 3, 2020	17.4%
324	129	"Dalamhati ni Kulas (Kulas' Sadness)"	January 6, 2020	17.4%
325	130	"Tugisin (Chase After)"	January 7, 2020	17.0%
326	131	"Paglaban (Fighting)"	January 8, 2020	16.1%
327	132	"Paraan (Way)"	January 9, 2020	15.8%
328	133	"Sundan (Follow)"	January 10, 2020	15.3%
329	134	"Puno't Dulo (Root Cause)"	January 13, 2020	16.5%
330	135	"Pabor (Favor)"	January 14, 2020	16.0%
331	136	"Madamay"	January 15, 2020	16.7%
332	137	"Sakripisyo (Sacrifice)"	January 16, 2020	17.6%
333	138	"Itakwil (Disown)"	January 17, 2020	17.9%
334	139	"Pagtugis (Pursuit)"	January 20, 2020	15.8%
335	140	"Hinagpis ni Marga (Marga's Resentment)"	January 21, 2020	16.3%
336	141	"Pagdudahan (Doubt)"	January 22, 2020	16.0%
337	142	"Salisihan"	January 23, 2020	16.8%
338	143	"Hulog ni Daniela"	January 24, 2020	19.0%
339	144	"Kaligtasan"	January 27, 2020	19.0%
340	145	"Walang Takas (No Escape)"	January 28, 2020	17.6%
341	146	"Linlangin (Mislead)"	January 29, 2020	17.1%
342	147	"Kakampi (Ally)"	January 30, 2020	18.5%
343	148	"Patakasin (Run Away)"	January 31, 2020	18.3%
344	149	"Huling 5 Araw (Last 5 Days)"	February 3, 2020	18.4%
345	150	"Huling 4 Araw (Last 4 Days)"	February 4, 2020	19.2%
346	151	"Huling 3 Araw (Last 3 Days)"	February 5, 2020	22.4%
347	152	"Huling 2 Araw (Last 2 Days)"	February 6, 2020	22.5%
348	153	"The Battle of the Dragons"	February 7, 2020	26.2%
