= Click, Like, Share =

2021–22 Philippine television drama series

- Official release poster for Season 3
- Genre: Drama; Thriller
- Written by: Tiano Tan; Camille Anne de la Cruz
- Directed by: Emmanuel Quindo Palo (1-2); Andoy Ranay (3-)
- Starring: Kyle Echarri (s1e1); Francine Diaz (s1e2); Seth Fedelin (s1e3); Andrea Brillantes (s1e4); Maymay Entrata (s2e1); Tony Labrusca (s2e2); Barbie Imperial s2e3); Janella Salvador (se4); Vivoree (s3e1); Elmo Magalona (s3e2); JC Alcantara (s3e3); Belle Mariano(s3e4)
- Music by: Francis de Veyra
- Opening theme: Various
- Ending theme: Various
- Country of origin: Philippines
- Original language: Filipino
- No. of seasons: 3
- No. of episodes: 12

Production
- Executive producers: Carlo L. Katigbak; Jamie L. Lopez; Cory V. Vidanes; Roldeo T. Endrinal; Aldrin M. Cerrado; Ginny Monteagudo-Ocampo
- Producers: Ethel Manaloto-Espiritu; Kate Valenzuela
- Production locations: Metro Manila, Philippines
- Cinematography: Rap Ramirez; Erwin Cruz
- Editors: Mark Jason Sucgang; Noah Tonga
- Running time: 30–45 minutes
- Production companies: Dreamscape Entertainment; KreativDen Entertainment

Original release
- Network: iWantTFC
- Release: June 5, 2021 – February 2, 2022

Click, Like, Share is a Philippine anthology streaming television series starring various ABS-CBN Star Magic and Rise artists, directed by Emmanuel "Manny" Quindo Palo and Andoy Ranay, and produced by Dreamscape Entertainment, and KreativDen Entertainment. Premiered on June 5, 2021, on iWantTFC, it focuses on the negative effects of the excessive use of social media, especially on the youth.

The series was renewed for a third season, which was released on iWantTFC in January 2022.

== Premise ==
Click, Like, Share presents stories of people who depend on social media to connect with others and/or express themselves, but later on invite danger into their lives when they start using it recklessly.

== Cast and characters ==
=== Season 1 ===
Episode 1

- Kyle Echarri as Brennan
- Danica Ontengco as Ashley
- Chie Filomeno as the voice of Arya

Episode 2

- Francine Diaz as Karen
- Renshi de Guzman as Eric
- Beatriz Teves as Jessie
- Sharina Villena as Daphne

Episode 3

- Seth Fedelin as Cocoy
- Jimuel Pacquiao as Jacob
- Angeli Bayani as Susan
- Gian Magdangal as Ismael
- PJ Endrinal as Obet

Episode 4

- Andrea Brillantes as Beth/Lily
- Nio Tria as Gerald
- Sheenly Gener as Beth's mom
- Alyssa Herrera as Jackie
- Dalia Varde as Charisse
- Izabel Reyes as Kelly
- Keena Pineda as Bela

=== Season 2 ===
Episode 1

- Maymay Entrata as Beng
- Michelle Vito as Trish
- Malou Crisologo as Yaya Mercy
- Renz Aguilar as Alex

Episode 2

- Tony Labrusca as Homer
- Tess Antonio as Thelma
- Franco Daza as David
- Kate Alejandrino as Leslie
- Paolo Gumabao as Boyet

Episode 3

- Barbie Imperial as Jenna
- Jerome Ponce as Vince
- Lance Reblando as Kris

Episode 4

- Janella Salvador as Janice
- Sherry Lara as Lola Cora
- Louise Abuel as Carlo
- Mutya Orquia as Joan

=== Season 3 ===
Episode 1

- Vivoree Esclito as Ellie
- Frances Makil-Ignacio as Elaine
- Bart Guingona as Mr.David
- Ross Pesigan as Elton
- Mark Rivera as Greg

Episode 2

- Elmo Magalona as Jerome
- Jane Oineza as Mariel
- Milo Elmido Jr. as Andy

Episode 3

- JC Alcantara as Jame
- Allan Paule as Gardo
- Jerom Canlas as Bryan
- Alener Ferrer as young James
- Alain Villafuerte as a lawyer

Episode 4

- Belle Mariano as Jessie
- Shanaia Gomez as Jenny
- Nikki Valdez as Mylene
- Bernard Palanca as Jon
- Nelsito Gomez as Cris

== Episodes ==
=== Series overview ===
Season	Episodes	Originally released	
Season	Episodes	First released	Last released
1	4	June 5, 2021	June 26, 2021
2	4	September 3, 2021; September 5, 2021 (TV airing)	September 24, 2021; September 26, 2021 (TV airing)
3	4	January 12, 2022	February 2, 2022

=== Season 1 (June 2021) ===
The episodes for this season were released every Saturday at 6:00 PM (PST) starting June 5, 2021 on KTX.ph, iWantTFC, and TFC IPTV.

No. overall	No. in season	Title	Written by	Original release date
1	1	"Reroute"	Tiano Tan	June 5, 2021
Brennan, who became obsessed with social media, would see his life in limbo when an app suddenly falls in love with him and attempts to control his life, eventually destroying his relationship with Ashley. Cast: Kyle Echarri as Brennan, Danica Ontengco as Ashley, Chie Filomeno as the voice of Arya
2	2	"Cancelled"	Tiano Tan	June 12, 2021
After becoming a known social media influencer overnight, Karen would face consequences for her clout-clashing gimmicks. Cast: Francine Diaz as Karen, Renshi de Guzman as Eric, Beatriz Teves as Jessie, Sharina Villena as Daphne
3	3	"Trending"	Tiano Tan	June 19, 2021
Cocoy fabricates a story that made him famous, only for more bad deeds to return to him. Cast: Seth Fedelin as Cocoy, Jimuel Pacquiao as Jacob, Angeli Bayani as Susan, Gian Magdangal as Ismael, PJ Endrinal as Obet
4	4	"Poser"	Tiano Tan	June 26, 2021
Beth will face consequences for using a face-morphing application to deceive a potential date, and would later hijack her life. Cast: Andrea Brillantes as Beth/Lily, Nio Tria as Gerald, Sheenly Gener as Beth's mom, Alyssa Herrera as Jackie, Dalia Varde as Charisse, Izabel Reyes as Kelly, Keena Pineda as Bela

=== Season 2 (September 2021) ===
The episodes for this season were released every Friday at 8:00 PM (PST) starting September 3, 2021 on iWantTFC. Two days after, it airs every Sunday on Kapamilya Channel, Kapamilya Online Live, and A2Z at 8:30 PM (PST).

No. overall	No. in season	Title	Written by	Original release date
5	1	"Lurker"	Camille Anne de la Cruz	September 3, 2021
Beng, an industrious waitress, will experience the danger of oversharing herself on social media. After being embarrassed by Trish, a wealthy social media influencer, Beng seeks revenge by going through Trish's social media accounts in an attempt to destroy her life. Cast: Maymay Entrata as Beng, Michelle Vito as Trish, Malou Crisologo as Yaya Mercy, Renz Aguilar as Alex
6	2	"Altered"	Tiano Tan	September 10, 2021
Using his photo editing skills, Homer manipulates photos of well-known personalities for a living. With this, he successfully fulfills a high-profile job order, but suddenly have his life compromised after being linked to a conspiracy about the murder of a wealthy businessman. Cast: Tony Labrusca as Homer, Tess Antonio as Thelma, Franco Daza as David, Kate Alejandrino as Leslie, Paolo Gumabao as Boyet
7	3	"Found"	Camille Anne de la Cruz	September 17, 2021
With the use of an online dating application, Jenna helps her transgender bestfriend Kris get a date with Vince. However, Jenna starts to fall in love with Vince in the same way. This tested her friendship as she has to choose between her bestfriend or her new found love. Cast: Barbie Imperial as Jenna, Jerome Ponce as Vince, Lance Reblando as Kris
8	4	"Barter"	Tiano Tan	September 24, 2021
After her mother's passing, Janice becomes the sole provider for her sister. To help supplement the needs of the family, Janice turns to sell faulty appliances online, which led to one customer to die while using that appliance. As a consequence to this, a series of events will eventually haunt her and will change her life for the worse. Cast: Janella Salvador as Janice, Sherry Lara as Lola Cora, Louise Abuel as Carlo, Mutya Orquia as Joan

=== Season 3 (January 2022) ===
The episodes for this season will be released every Wednesdays at 8:00 PM (PST) starting January 12, 2022 on iWantTFC.

No. overall	No. in season	Title	Written by	Original release date
9	1	"QR Code"	Tiano Tan	January 19, 2022
Despite showing her kindness at work being a Lady Guard, Ellie was fired from her job after allowing a man to pass through the building without a quick response code on hand. Tired with all the adversities she faced, she decides to leave the country to work, but a series of coincidences would make it more difficult for her to decide. Cast: Vivoree Esclito as Ellie, Frances Makil-Ignacio as Elaine, Bart Guingona as Mr.David, Ross Pesigan as Elton, Mark Rivera as Greg
10	2	"Unseen"	Tiano Tan	January 26, 2022
Jerome and Mariel were long-time lovers, until an accident occurred that led Mariel to total blindness. Guilty for what he has done, Jerome allocated his time to attend to her care, until he suddenly disappears from her life forever. Cast: Elmo Magalona as Jerome, Jane Oineza as Mariel, Milo Elmido Jr. as Andy
11	3	"Repair"	Tiano Tan	January 12, 2022
James, a young cop, has been living in shame because of his late father who was a convicted criminal. With the death anniversary of his dad's victim coming near, the issue resurfaced online and finds himself looking back to confront his father on the issue. Cast: JC Alcantara as James, Allan Paule as Gardo, Jerom Canlas as Bryan, Alener Ferrer as young James, Alain Villafuerte as a lawyer
12	4	"Swap"	Tiano Tan	February 2, 2022
Out of envy and jealousy, Jessie, a deeply insecure tawdry girl, gets to fulfill her wish to switch bodies with her famous vlogger sister Jenny. From there, they start to realize that their lives are more complicated than they appear. Cast: Belle Mariano as Jessie, Shanaia Gomez as Jenny, Nikki Valdez as Mylene, Bernard Palanca as Jon, Nelsito Gomez as Cris

== Official soundtrack ==
Click, Like, Share (Original Soundtrack)

Soundtrack album by various artists
- Released: May 28, 2021
- Recorded: 2020, 2021
- Genres: OPM, Indie pop, Soundtrack
- Length: 15:36
- Languages: Filipino, English
- Label: Star Music
- Producers: Jonathan Manalo; Roque "Rox" Santos; Kyle Echarri

The official soundtrack for the series was released on May 28, 2021, and consists of tracks mostly featured in season 1 including two earlier released singles "Panaginip" and "Umaga".

Click Like Share (Original Soundtrack)
No.	Title	Writer(s)	Artist	Length
1.	"Kontrol"	Angela Ken Rojas	Angela Ken	4:19
2.	"Cancelledt"	Sabine Cerrado	SAB	4:09
3.	"Panaginip"	Kyle Echarri	Kyle Echarri	3:42
4.	"Umaga"	Arvey; Jonathan Manalo	Arvey	3:46
Total length:				15:36

== Production ==
Apart from the members of The Gold Squad (Echarri, Diaz, Fedelin, and Brillantes), Danica Ontengco, Renshi de Guzman, Jimuel Pacquiao, and Nio Tria of The Squad Plus were included as part of the first season. That season marked the acting debut for Pacquiao and, most especially, Tria whose mother Cherry Pie Picache is an actress.

In the third season, it was revealed in an iWantTFC event that Elmo Magalona, Vivoree Esclito, JC Alcantara, and Belle Mariano (who was also slated to be part of the second season of another iWantTFC series He's Into Her) were to be part of the season's cast members, and seasoned director Andoy Ranay serves as the series's director beginning this season.

== Release ==
=== Broadcast ===
The first two seasons of the series had its Philippine TV Premiere on Kapamilya Channel's Yes Weekend Sunday primetime, Kapamilya Online Live and A2Z from August 8 to September 26, 2021, replacing the first season of He's Into Her and was replaced by Melting Me Softly.

The third season premiered from December 4 and 11, 2022 replacing Lyric and Beat and it was replaced by the reaired first season of Almost Paradise. It also aired international via TFC.
