= Southville International School affiliated with Foreign Universities =

Private international school in Las Piñas, Philippines

Southville International School Affiliated with Foreign Universities
- Motto: Be Amazing. Be Southville.
- Type: Private International University
- President: Dr. Jocelyn P. Tizon
- Location: BF International, Las Piñas City, Philippines; 14°27′20″N 120°59′43″E
- Website: www.sisfu.edu.ph
- Location in Metro Manila Location in Luzon Location in the Philippines

Southville International School Affiliated with Foreign Universities (SISFU) is a private university located in Las Piñas, in the southern part of Metro Manila, Philippines. It was established in 1998 as Southville Foreign Colleges and is the only provider of Tertiary Transnational Education in the Philippines. The school was founded to provide international curricula and qualifications in the Philippines. It is the only university in the Philippines accredited to offer De Montfort University and Pearson BTEC qualifications.

== History ==
Southville International School Affiliated with Foreign Universities (SISFU) was founded in 1997 by Roger and Helen Bartholomew who teamed up with Southville International School and Colleges (SISC).

In 2018, SISFU introduced the Online Blended Learning program.

In 2019, SISFU expanded its partnership with De Montfort University to offer three undergraduate degree programmes: the Bachelor of Arts in Business Administration and Management (Hons), Bachelor of Arts in Accounting and Business Management (Hons), and the Bachelor of Arts in Entrepreneurship and Innovation (Hons).

== Sister schools ==
- Southville International School and Colleges
- South Mansfield College
- Asian SEED Academy of Technology
- South SEED LPDH College
- Stonyhurst Southville International School

== Partner University ==
- De Montfort University
- Pearson Education
- Swiss Hotel Management School
- Macquarie University
- James Cook University

== Notable people ==
- Enrique Gil, actor
- Francine Diaz, actress
- Heaven Peralejo, actress
- Joshua Garcia, actor
- Janine Teñoso, singer and songwriter
- Liza Soberano, actress
- Nash Aguas, actor
