= Lyric and Beat =

2022 Philippine television series

- Official release poster
- Genre: Romantic comedy Teen drama Musical
- Written by: Dolly Dulu; Miyo Sta. Maria; John Rogers
- Directed by: Dolly Dulu
- Starring: Andrea Brillantes; Seth Fedelin; Darren Espanto; AC Bonifacio; Kyle Echarri; Angela Ken; Jeremy Glinoga; Sheena Belarmino; Awra Briguela
- Music by: Paulo Protacio
- Opening theme: "Lyric & Beat" by Darren Espanto, Jeremy G, Angela Ken, Kyle Echarri, AC Bonifacio, Andrea Brillantes, Seth Fedelin, Sheena Belarmino, and Awra Briguela
- Ending theme: "Tara Tena" by AC Bonifacio, Andrea Brillantes, Angela Ken, Darren Espanto, Jeremy G, Seth Fedelin, Sheena Belarmino (Episodes 1-5, 7) "Duyan" by Darren Espanto (Episode 6) "Lyric & Beat" by Darren Espanto, Jeremy G, Angela Ken, Kyle Echarri, AC Bonifacio, Andrea Brillantes, Seth Fedelin, Sheena Belarmino, and Awra Briguela (Episode 8)
- Composer: Jonathan Manalo
- Country of origin: Philippines
- Original languages: Filipino; English
- No. of episodes: 8

Production
- Executive producers: Carlo L. Katigbak; Cory V. Vidanes; Roldeo T. Endrinal; Jamie C. Lopez; Ginny Monteagudo-Ocampo
- Producer: Cathy Magdael-Abarrondo
- Production location: Baguio
- Editor: Noah Tonga
- Running time: 50 minutes
- Production company: Dreamscape Entertainment

Original release
- Network: iWantTFC
- Release: August 10 – September 23, 2022

Lyric and Beat is a Philippine musical teen drama streaming television series. Directed by Dolly Dulu, the series premiered on August 10 to September 23, 2022, on iWantTFC.

This series pays tribute to the "20 years of music" of ABS-CBN Music's creative director Jonathan Manalo.

== Plot ==
Lyric (Andrea Brillantes), a bubbly and aspiring singer, is willing to do everything to fulfill her dream despite her father's (Lito Pimentel) constant objections. Having seen her potential and being offered a scholarship, Lyric finally enters the fictional Philippine National Conservatory of Music where she would meet Beat (Seth Fedelin), a soft-spoken singer and dancer. It is from there that students will compete against each other for the privilege to represent the school in the National Music Competition, a well-renowned school-based competition for music, that will test different friendships and their competitive spirit.

== Cast and characters ==
=== Main cast ===
- Andrea Brillantes as Lyric, a driven teenager who aspires to be a famous singer like her late mother
- Seth Fedelin as Beat, an introverted freshman who developed stage fright
- Darren Espanto as Jazz, team captain of the Prime Belters and one of the best singers in PNCM
- AC Bonifacio as Cadence, Jazz's best friend who wants to introduce dancing in show choir
- Kyle Echarri as Grae, the team captain of a rival school
- Angela Ken as Virlyn, a church choir member who is proficient in musical instruments
- Jeremy Glinoga as Stevie, a student who stutters but not when he sings
- Sheena Belarmino as Melissa, Jazz's sister and a resident mean girl
- Awra Briguela as Unique, a student who often refuses to accept criticisms

=== Supporting cast ===
- Agot Isidro as Viola Espiritu
- Nyoy Volante as Wolfgang Aragon
- Joel Saracho as Principal William Guico
- Jett Pangan as Peter
- Lilet Esteban as Isay
- Lito Pimentel as Jeff
- Upeng Fernandez as Lola Carmen
- Gian Magdangal as Adrian
- Pinky Amador as Sonja
- Alora Sasam as Smile
- Julian Alturas as Max
- Sheenly Gener as Candy
- Brian Sy as Rajo

Team Werpa

- Trisha Fabe as Mai
- Aicy Fabe as Mia

Team Prime Belters

- Roco Sanchez
- RJ Perkins
- Anton Posadas
- Ivanka Guillermo
- Kei Kurosawa
- Kysha Navarro
- CJ De Guzman

Team School of Modern Pop

- Joshua Decena
- Jasper Almario
- Jom Logdat
- Chael Ablaza
- Planes Jose Mari
- Ryzen Magpayo
- Ysai Castro
- Kiara Dario
- Trisha Martin
- JM Yrreverre

=== Supporting roles ===
- James Graham as Tomie
- Jonathan Manalo as Judge
- Stephen Vinas as Judge
- Charleine Gonzales as Host
- Anna Graham as Beat's mom
- Pongss Leonardo as Bar Manager
- Jackie Papica as Amiga 1
- Maribel Domingo as Amiga 2

=== Special participation ===
- PJ Endrinal as Prez

== Episodes ==
No.	Title	Original release date
1	"Even Clowns Have Dreams"	August 10, 2022
Despite her family's financial situation, Lyric vows to do everything she can to enter her dream school—the Philippine National Conservatory of Music. Soon, fate answers her prayer when she receives an offer to audition for a PNCM scholarship.
2	"A Place for Misfit Dreamers"	August 12, 2022
Getting a final chance to enter PNCM, Lyric sings her way into the school with the help of Wolfgang, Virlyn, and Stevie. While Cadence finds herself no longer welcome in the Prime Belters, Wolfgang's new show choir recruits members.
3	"Dance to the Beat of Your Heart"	August 19, 2022
Cadence completes Team Werpa, and Wolfgang welcomes her suggestion to do a sing and dance number for their performance. Jazz confronts Cadence for leaving Prime Belters. Meanwhile, Lyric spends time with Beat outside their org room.
4	"A Spy Among Friends"	August 26, 2022
The Werpa members think there is a spy among the group, causing them to lose focus on their goals. Lyric meets an unexpected person who can tell her more about her mother, Isay. A mini-showdown places the team to a test.
5	"The Trio Gen Divas"	September 2, 2022
Lyric defies Jeff's wishes and insists on meeting with her mother's former manager, Peter. Beat opens up to Lyric about his rift with his father and his trip to Atok. Meanwhile, Jazz learns what his father thinks of his music.
6	"WERPA vs Prime Belters"	September 9, 2022
With Lyric missing and the showdown with the Prime Belters approaching, Werpa falls into chaos. Cadence takes over the rehearsals while Beat realizes where to find Lyric. Elsewhere, Lyric meets Grae.
7	"The Secret is Out"	September 16, 2022
Flexing their skills in PNCM, Grae and his crew send out a challenge to Werpa. This shakes up Werpa's newfound confidence, to which Cadence has a solution. But Cadence's idea comes at a price as Lyric's real identity gets exposed.
8	"Werpa 2.0"	September 23, 2022
After uniting to achieve a goal, Werpa and Prime Belters gear up for their showdown against the School of Modern Pop. To nail their victory, Lyric persuades Melissa to join them. Meanwhile, Beat plans to express his feelings to Lyric.

== Official soundtrack ==
Four official soundtrack volumes for the series were released between August and September 2022, and consists of tracks mostly composed by Jonathan Manalo with some notable contributions from cast member Jeremy Glinoga, Vice Ganda, Itchyworms's co-lead vocalist Jazz Nicolas, and TV Patrol co-anchor Bernadette Sembrano.

The first volume includes an earlier released single "Ako Naman Muna" by Angela Ken, albeit not a Manalo original composition, is also part of the series. The second volume includes "That Hero" by Iñigo Pascual, Kidwolf, and Theo Martel.

Lyric and Beat, Vol. 01 (Original Soundtrack)

Soundtrack album by Various artists
- Released: August 12, 2022
- Recorded: 2022
- Studio: The Purple Room, Quezon City
- Genre: OPM, Indie pop, Soundtrack
- Length: 27:40
- Language: Filipino, English
- Label: Star Music, StarPop
- Producer: Jonathan Manalo

Lyric and Beat, Vol. 01 (Original Soundtrack)
No.	Title	Writer(s)	Artist	Length
1.	"Lyric & Beat"	Anna Graham, Jeremy Eriq Glinoga, Jonathan Manalo	Darren Espanto, Jeremy G, Angela Ken, Kyle Echarri, AC Bonifacio, Andrea Brillantes, Seth Fedelin, Sheena Belarmino, & Awra Briguela	3:30
2.	"Jonathan Manalo Overture (Note: A cover medley of "Sa Isang Pangarap", "Hindi Kita Iiwan", "Pangarap Kong Pangarap Mo", "Tara Tena", and "Patuloy Ang Pangarap".)"		Andrea Brillantes, Seth Fedelin, Darren Espanto, AC Bonifacio, Jeremy G, Angela Ken, & Sheena Belarmino	2:57
3.	"Sa Isang Pangarap"		Andrea Brillantes	2:44
4.	"Kabataang Pinoy"	Jazz Nicolas, Jonathan Manalo	Andrea Brillantes, Seth Fedelin, Jeremy G, Angela Ken, & Sheena Belarmino	3:55
5.	"Hindi Kita Iiwan"		Seth Fedelin	3:57
6.	"Tara Tena"		AC Bonifacio, Andrea Brillantes, Angela Ken, Darren Espanto, Jeremy G, Seth Fedelin, Sheena Belarmino	4:01
7.	"Boom Panes"	Jonathan Manalo, Rox Santos, Vice Ganda	Andrea Brillantes	1:07
8.	"Ako Naman Muna"	Angela Ken Rojas	Angela Ken	5:27
Total length:				27:40

Lyric and Beat, Vol. 02 (Original Soundtrack)

Soundtrack album by Various artists
- Released: August 26, 2022
- Recorded: 2022
- Genre: OPM, Indie pop, Soundtrack
- Length: 22:21
- Language: Filipino, English
- Label: Star Music, StarPop
- Producer: Jonathan Manalo

Lyric and Beat, Vol. 02 (Original Soundtrack)
No.	Title	Writer(s)	Artist	Length
1.	"Must Be Going Crazy"	Alexander Diaz, Jonathan Manalo	Jeremy G	3:37
2.	"Pangarap Kong Pangarap Mo"		Darren Espanto & Sheena Belarmino	2:54
3.	"Power of the Dream"		Darren Espanto & Sheena Belarmino	4:49
4.	"Pagbigyan Muli"		Darren Espanto	4:53
5.	"Free Fall Into Love"		AC Bonifacio	2:50
6.	"That Hero"		Iñigo Pascual & Kidwolf, Theo Martel	4:01
Total length:				22:21

Lyric and Beat (Original Soundtrack Vol. 03)

Soundtrack album by Various artists
- Released: September 9, 2022
- Recorded: 2022
- Genre: OPM, Indie pop, Soundtrack
- Length: 20:55
- Language: Filipino, English
- Label: Star Music, StarPop
- Producer: Jonathan Manalo

Lyric and Beat (Original Soundtrack Vol. 03)
No.	Title	Writer(s)	Artist	Length
1.	"Ipaglalaban Ka"		Andrea Brillantes, Seth Fedelin, AC Bonifacio, Jeremy G, Angela Ken, & Sheena Belarmino	2:26
2.	"Ang Sa Iyo Ay Akin"	Jonathan Manalo, Bernadette Sembrano	Agot Isidro, Lilet Esteban, & Sheenly Gener	1:25
3.	"May Kasama Ka"		Nyoy Volante	3:02
4.	"Duyan"	Jonathan Manalo, Robert Calma	Darren Espanto	4:42
5.	"Patuloy Ang Pangarap"		Agot Isidro, Lilet Esteban, & Sheenly Gener	4:40
6.	"It's Okay Not To Be Okay"		Kyle Echarri	2:36
7.	"Power of The Dream (Prime Belter's Version)"		Darren Espanto & Sheena Belarmino	2:02
Total length:				20:55

Lyric and Beat (Original Soundtrack Vol. 04)

Soundtrack album by Various artists
- Released: September 23, 2022
- Recorded: 2022
- Genre: OPM, Indie pop, Soundtrack
- Length: 22:26
- Language: Filipino, English
- Label: Star Music, StarPop
- Producer: Jonathan Manalo

Lyric and Beat (Original Soundtrack Vol. 04)
No.	Title	Writer(s)	Artist	Length
1.	"What U Want"		Kyle Echarri & Sheena Belarmino	4:01
2.	"Bakit Lumuluha"	Jonathan Manalo, Paula Alcasid	Andrea Brillantes, Darren Espanto, & Sheena Belarmino	2:21
3.	"Boom Panes"	Jonathan Manalo, Rox Santos, Vice Ganda	Awra Briguela	1:07
4.	"My Destiny"	Jonathan Manalo, Sabine Cerrado	Sheena Belarmino	4:16
5.	"May Pag-asa Ba?"	Angela Ken Rojas, Jeremy Eriq Glinoga, Jonathan Manalo	Angela Ken, & Jeremy G	3:03
6.	"Sa Isang Pangarap"		Andrea Brillantes & Sheena Belarmino	2:36
7.	"Lyric & Beat - Final Competition Version"	Jeremy Eriq Glinoga, Jonathan Manalo	Darren Espanto, Jeremy G, Angela Ken, AC Bonifacio, Andrea Brillantes, Seth Fedelin, Sheena Belarmino, & Awra Briguela	2:31
8.	"Let It Loose"	Jonathan Manalo, Marion Aunor	Kyle Echarri	3:31
Total length:				22:26

== Production ==
Due to the restrictions caused by the COVID-19 pandemic in the Philippines, production was done with safety protocols implemented, and all actors and production staff underwent lock-in taping in Baguio until, as per Instagram update from cast member Darren Espanto, taping has concluded in March 2022. Prior to lock-in tapings, the cast have attended workshops and rehearsals in December 2021.

=== Casting ===
Brillantes, Fedelin, Espanto, Bonifacio, Ken, Glinoga, and Belarmino (on her first acting project) are first announced as main cast members in late 2021. In February 2022, fresh from his stint in Pinoy Big Brother: Kumunity Season 10, Echarri was included as main cast member. Volante meanwhile reprise his role as an actor.

=== Marketing ===
An earlier teaser was released in November 2021 on ABS-CBN Entertainment's social media platforms, initially to be premiered on iQiyi after the Philippine media company and the Chinese online on-demand video streaming platform created a partnership, with ABS-CBN already producing content for iQiyi, including Hello, Heart and Saying Goodbye.

However, in a new teaser released in July 2022 on its YouTube channel, it was announced that it will be released on iWantTFC this August 2022. No details to such a move was made. The full trailer was released on July 13, 2022, on iWantTFC's social media platforms with August 10, 2022, as the slated release date. After the trailer's release, the hashtag #LyricAndBeatTrailer made it to the top trending topics in Twitter Philippines.

=== Music ===
Most of the music being used feature original compositions from ABS-CBN Music creative director Jonathan Manalo who has made about 400 original compositions since becoming the grand winner of the 2001 edition of Himig Handog with his winning piece Tara Tena.

== Release ==
=== Broadcast ===
The series premiered on August 10 to September 23, 2022, on iWantTFC.

The series had its Philippine TV Premiere from October 9 to November 27, 2022, on Yes Weekend Sunday primetime on Kapamilya Channel, Kapamilya Online Live and A2Z replacing Run to Me and was replaced by third season of Click, Like, Share. It also aired international via TFC (The Filipino Channel).
