= Abandoned (2019 film) =

2019 Philippine psychological horror film

- Official release poster
- Directed by: Kip Oebanda
- Story by: Kip Oebanda
- Produced by: Carlo Katigbak; Deo Endrinal; Elaine Uy-Casipit; Cory V. Vidanes
- Starring: Beauty Gonzalez; Seth Fedelin; Allan De Paz
- Cinematography: Pong Ignacio
- Production companies: Dreamscape Entertainment; Quantum Films
- Distributed by: iWantTFC
- Release date: August 28, 2019
- Running time: 75 minutes
- Country: Philippines
- Language: Filipino

Abandoned is a 2019 Philippine psychological horror film starring Beauty Gonzalez, Seth Fedelin, Allan De Paz, directed by Kip Oebanda and produced by Dreamscape Entertainment together with Quantum Films. The film was released on August 28, 2019, on iWantTFC.

== Synopsis ==
Simone (Beauty Gonzalez), a security guard and single mother, experiences post-traumatic stress disorder (PTSD) following a robbery that resulted in the death of her colleagues. She works diligently to support her son, Rj (Seth Fedelin). After the incident, Simone is reassigned to guard a haunted and abandoned building. Strange occurrences soon begin during her shifts, causing her to relive the painful memories of the past, which in turn, adversely affects both her and her son.

== Cast ==
- Beauty Gonzalez as Simone
- Seth Fedelin as Rj
- Allan De Paz as Renante
- Barbara Ruaro as Ciel
- Nico Antonio as Sol
- Matt Daclan as Nestor
- Archi Adamos as Ruel
- Iana Bernardez as Alice
- Kenneth Paul Cruz as Marko
- Rolando Inocencio as Simone's dad
- Shermaine Santiago as Simone's mom

== Production ==
The film was directed by Kip Oebanda and produced by Dreamscape Entertainment. It marks the first film project for Seth Fedelin, a former housemate of Pinoy Big Brother: Otso. Fedelin mentioned feeling nervous during the shooting but found motivation and support from his co-star and the director.
