= Our Moment (song) =

Single by Kyle Echarri

from the album It's Me Kyle
- Released: September 22, 2016
- Recorded: 2016
- Genre: Pop
- Length: 3:42
- Label: MCA/Universal
- Songwriters: Roxanne Seeman; Philip Doron Bailey, Jr.; Jens Hoy; Rasmus Rudolph Seogaard
- Producer: Francis Guevarra

Kyle Echarri singles chronology
"Fall For Me" (2016)	"Our Moment" (2016)	"Pangako" (2018)

Music video
- "Our Moment" on YouTube "Our Moment (Alternate)" on YouTube

"Our Moment" is a song by Filipino pop singer Kyle Echarri, contestant of The Voice Kids Philippines, Season 2. It was written by Roxanne Seeman, Philip Doron Bailey, Jr., Jens Hoy and Rasmus Rudolph Soegaard. The song was released as a single and as an acoustic version, from the album "It's Me, Kyle" by MCA Music on September 22, 2016.

Echarri performed "Our Moment" live in Buenos Aires, Argentina on December 6, 2019.

== Composition and lyrics ==
"Our Moment" is a pop song produced as a dance track by Francis Guevarra. The tempo is 120bpm. The acoustic alternate rounds at 114bpm.

Echarri points out the song is about "being free, true and real. We need to be who we are and not pretend. Because if we are true, only then can we be truly free.”

== Music video ==
Echarri was the MYX Celebrity VJ in April 2017. A music video for the song was shot in April 2017 by the Philippine pay TV channel MYX. MYX told fans to "expect something different from Kyle..." During the music video shoot Echarri was quoted saying "I have not danced this much ever in my life".

== Televised and live performances ==
- "Letters and Music", one-hour live TV show, Eagle Rock and Rhythm, net25.tv
- ASAP Chillout, ABS-CBN Entertainment
- ONE MUSIC POPSSSS
- Forum Robinsons
