= Michael Leyva =

Filipino fashion designer

- Born: October 22, 1989 (age 36)
- Education: University of Santo Tomas
- Occupation: Fashion Designer

Michael Leyva is a Filipino fashion designer. He is primarily known for his bridal designs.

== Early life and education ==
Michael is fifth among six sons to Nanay Merly Leyva.

When he was ten years old, he saw his older brother, Brian Leyva, designing and creating dresses from scratch in the family living room. At times, Brian would ask him to buy sewing materials from Divisoria. However, he never imagined following in Brian's footsteps.

Michael graduated with a Tourism degree from the University of Santo Tomas. He took a fashion design course at Central Saint Martins in London. He also took up fashion courses under Jojie Lloren, a local veteran fashion designer.

His tragic life story was featured in a docuseries, "Maalaala Mo Kaya."

== Career ==
Michael initially pursued a career as a flight steward. However, he was not happy with his work, so he considered a career in fashion when Brian was mugged and gunned down on March 29, 2010. Brian was considered one of the promising young designers in the 2000s. Brian won first place in a fashion design competition (Young Designers Guild Competition) held in Paris, France, in 2004.

When Brian died, he had three pending projects that Michael took upon himself to complete. Michael was hesitant at first because of his zero background in fashion design. He struggled as a new fashion designer. He used to fit clients at coffee shops because he did not have a shop of his own. Michael's earnings then were only enough to pay for his seamstresses.

Michael staged his 10th anniversary as a fashion designer at the National Museum, the first in the museum's history. He debuted the 50-piece collection, dubbed Hiraya, during the fashion show. The show took eight months to complete.

In 2021, Michael Cinco asked Michael to do a showcase in Dubai as part of Arab Fashion Week Spring/Summer 2021. Michael Leyva was one of the four brands represented on the final night of Arab Fashion Week 2022. He presented his Diamond Collection as part of Dubai's Design District (d3). He brought 30 pieces of dresses from the Philippines.

His tenth anniversary fashion show was held at the National Museum of the Philippines. In August 2023, his fashion show 'Isang Pilipinas' at Malacañang’s Goldenberg Mansion included fabrics–from Ilocos’ Inabel and T'nalak.

In 2024, Leyba launched his Bridal Couture 2025 collection-fashion at The Peninsula Manila. He showcased his Couture 2025 collection of pastel hues at Conrad Manila.

== Notable clients ==
Michael dressed Kris Aquino for the Hollywood premiere of “Crazy Rich Asians.” He has dressed up other local celebrities, including international fashion icon, Heart Evangelista; actress, Anne Curtis; Regine Velasquez, especially for her R3.0 (concert); Vice Ganda; and Andrea Brillantes. Michael is also the preferred designer of former Vice-president Atty. Leni Robredo, and First Lady Liza Marcos.

== Advocacy ==
In 2020, Michael reassembled his team to create personal protective equipment (PPE) for health workers in the Philippines. When COVID-19 hit, there was a shortage of PPEs in various hospitals in the country. Michael donated at least 3,000 hazmat suits, head covers, and 5,000 washable face masks.
