= Francine Diaz =

Filipino actress (born 2004)

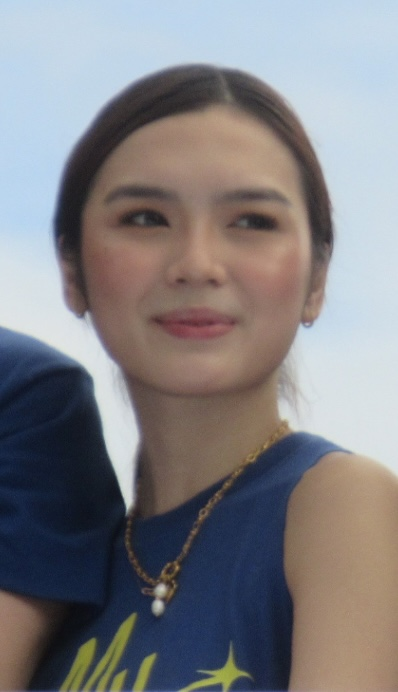
- Diaz in 2024
- Born: Francine Carrel Saenz Diaz; January 27, 2004 (age 22); Tondo, Manila, Philippines
- Education: Southville International School Affiliated with Foreign Universities
- Occupations: Actress; singer
- Years active: 2014–present
- Agent: Star Magic
- Height: 1.57 m (5 ft 2 in)

YouTube information
- Channel: Francine Diaz
- Years active: 2020–present
- Genre: Vlogging
- Subscribers: 2.22 million
- Views: 80.1 million
- Last updated: February 6, 2025

Francine Carrel Saenz Diaz (Tagalog: [pɾan'sin ˈdɪas]; born January 27, 2004) is a Filipino actress and singer. She began her career at age 10, playing minor and supporting roles in a number of television programs as young versions of the lead characters. She rose to prominence after playing Cassandra "Cassie" Mondragon in the series Kadenang Ginto (2018–2020).

== Early life and education ==
Diaz was born in Tondo, Manila, but later moved to Bacoor, Cavite. She is the third of the six children of Michael Diaz and Merdick Saenz. She has two older sisters, two younger sisters, and one younger brother.

She finished senior high school through the Accountancy, Business and Management (ABM) strand at Southville International School Affiliated with Foreign Universities in Las Piñas in 2024.

== Career ==
=== 2014–2018: Early career ===
Diaz began acting at the age of 10, in minor roles on television. She often portrayed younger versions of characters in various ABS-CBN tele-series. In 2014 she moved to a major role as young Ana Mauricio in the Ipaglaban Mo episode titled "Pagkilala sa Ama", alongside Jennica Garcia with Mylene Dizon. In 2015, she portrayed Young Sari in the drama series Pasión de Amor.

In 2016, she played young Pinang in the noontime drama series, Be My Lady and Anya in the comedy-drama series We Will Survive. She also played Ginny in the drama series The Blood Sisters.

=== 2018–2020: Rising popularity, Kadenang Ginto and Gold Squad ===
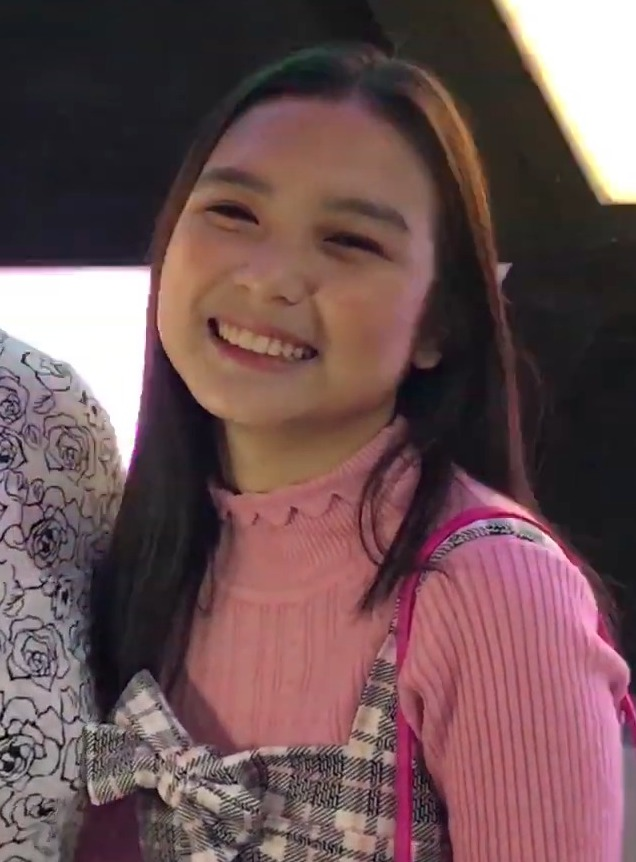
Diaz in 2018

In 2018, Diaz played the protagonist, Cassie Mondragon, of ABS-CBN's afternoon television series Kadenang Ginto. The success of Kadenang Ginto led to the founding of a group called "The Gold Squad", a teenage quartet made up of Diaz and fellow actors Kyle Echarri, Andrea Brillantes, and Seth Fedelin.

=== 2021–present: Subsequent projects ===
In 2021, she played Joy Cruz Cordero in the television series, Huwag Kang Mangamba, along with her fellow "Gold Squad" members. The quartet also became lead cast members in a digital anthology series, Click, Like, Share. Diaz's episode was called "Cancelled" with Renshi de Guzman in the first season. She also appeared in the thriller film Tenement 66 with Francis Magundayao and Noel Comia Jr. which was directed by Rae Red and co-produced by Dreamscape Entertainment. It competed in the 25th Bucheon International Fantastic Film Festival, under the "Bucheon Choice" category in South Korea. Her performance in Tenement 66 earned her the "PinakaPASADONG Katuwang na Aktres" ("Most Awesome Supporting Actress") at the 34th Gawad Pasado Awards. Diaz modeled at Michael Leyva's Enchanted Fashion Show at Hilton Manila in Pasay with Andrea Brillantes. She opened the show in a lilac gown with floral accents.

In 2022, she appeared as the yearly cover girl of Metro magazine, modeling fashion designer Michael Leyva's creations, Preview Ph, Candy Mag - as their First Digital Cover Girl of the Year, Stylish Magazine, Mega Magazine, and Village Pipol Magazine. Diaz starred in the web series Bola-Bola in the episode, "Cook. Feed. Love. Repeat", with Akira Morishita, KD Estrada, and Ashton Salvador. It was announced that Diaz will be reunited with fellow Gold Squad member, Seth Fedelin, for the series Dirty Linen. She also appeared in Zack Tabudlo's music video As You Are. Diaz was ranked ninth in the top Filipino YouTube creator in 2022.

In 2023, the pairing of Francine Diaz and Seth Fedelin were tested for the first time with their new drama series Dirty Linen by ABS-CBN and Dreamscape Entertainment in 2023 alongside Zanjoe Marudo and Janine Gutierrez. After the finale of the said series, the loveteam called FranSeth were formed and both of them starred in the new mini series called Fractured with Kaori Oinuma, Jeremiah Lisbo, Daniela Stranner, Raven Rigor, and Sean Tristan. The story is about a group of influencers who finds themselves trapped in a disappointing island resort.

In 2024, Diaz and Seth Fedelin debut in the 50th Metro Manila Film Festival with their first-ever movie together, My Future You. The film received 10 nominations, and won four awards including Best Director, Best Editing, 3rd Best picture, and a Breakthrough Performance for Seth Fedelin in the Gabi Ng Parangal. Diaz also collaborated with Korean artist Seo In-guk for the song "My Love".

In 2025, she starred in a series called Sins of the Father with Gerald Anderson, Shaina Magdayao, Jessy Mendiola, JC de Vera, RK Bagatsing, and Seth Fedelin. She then starred at Shake, Rattle & Roll Evil Origins, an official entry to the 51st 2025 Metro Manila Film Festival, with Seth Fedelin, Fyang Smith, JM Ibarra, Manilyn Reynes and many more.

In 2026, Diaz starred in the movie She Who Must Not Be Named with Seth Fedelin, Bobby Andrews, Ruby Ruiz, Kat Galang, Elijah Alejo, Raven Rigor, Abdul Raman, Kaleb Ong, and Kych Minemoto. She also starred in a variety show Kumusta with Jodi Sta. Maria, Janella Salvador, Arci Muñoz, Ji Chang-wook, and Michelin-recognized Filipino chef JP Anglo.

== Discography ==
=== Single ===
Year	Title	Album	Label
2019	"Pag-Ibig"	The Gold Squad Album	Star Music

=== Music videos ===
Year	Title	Artist	Label
2019	"Pag-Ibig"	Francine Diaz	Star Music
2021	"M.U. (Malabong Usapan)" (with Jayda Avanzado)	Jayda Avanzado	Star Music
2021	"Di Man Ngayon" (with The Gold Squad)	PJ Endrinal	Star Music
2022	"As You Are (AYA)" (with Zack Tabudlo)	Zack Tabudlo	UMUSIC Philippines; Island Records Philippines
2022	"Muli" (with Seth Fedelin & Ace Banzuelo)	Ace Banzuelo	Sony Music Philippines
2023	"Sinehan"	Sugarcane	Warner Music Philippines
2024	"Tayo Na Lang" (with Seth Fedelin)	Nobita	Sony Music Philippines

== Filmography ==
=== Film ===
Year	Title	Role	Notes	Ref.
2019	Silly Red Shoes	Ashley Magpantay	Main Role	
2021	Tenement 66	Lea	Supporting Role	
2024	My Future You	Karenina "Karen" Lopez	Lead Role, MMFF 2024 entry	
2025	Shake, Rattle & Roll: Evil Origins	Faye	Main Role, MMFF 2025 entry	
2026	She Who Must Not Be Named	Catleya/Caitlyn Raymundo	Lead Role	

=== Television ===
Year	Title	Role	Notes
2014	Ipaglaban Mo: Pagkilala sa Ama: Kidney	young Ana Mauricio	Supporting Role
2015	Pasión De Amor	young Sarita "Sari" Elizondo	Supporting Role
2016	Be My Lady	young Filipina "Pinang" Crisostomo	Supporting Role
2016	The Greatest Love	young Gloria Guerrerro / Tintin Alcantara	Supporting Role
2017	Ikaw Lang ang Iibigin	young Bianca Agbayani	Supporting Role
2017	Ipaglaban Mo: Lihim	Letlet	Supporting Role
2018	The Blood Sisters	Ginny Ortega Solomon	Supporting Role
2018	Ipaglaban Mo: Angkin	Anita's daughter	Supporting Role
2018	Maalaala Mo Kaya: Kalabaw	young Eleonita	Supporting Role
2018	Maalaala Mo Kaya: Kidney	young Love	Supporting Role
2018	Dok Ricky, Pedia	young Female Student	Supporting Role
2018–2020	Kadenang Ginto	Cassandra "Cassie" Andrada Mondragon	Main Role
2019	The General's Daughter	Preteen Rhian / Arabella Bonifacio	Supporting Role
2020	Paano Kita Mapasasalamatan?	young Kim Chiu	Supporting Role
2020	Bawal Lumabas: The Series	Jade Tesoro	Main Role
2021	Huwag Kang Mangamba	Joy Cruz Cordero	Main Role
2021	Click, Like, Share: Cancelled	Karen Villagracia	Main Role
2022	Bola Bola	Althea "Thea" Balderama	Main Role
2023	Dirty Linen	Chiara Fiero	Main Role
2023	Fractured	Sally Nicolas	Main Role
2025	Sins of the Father	Arissa Trinidad	Main Role

=== Microdramas ===
Year	Title	Role	Notes
2026	A Cake to Remember	Amanda "Mandy" Morales	

=== Live shows and variety shows ===
Year	Title	Role
2018–present	ASAP XP	Guest
2023	TV Patrol	Celebrity Star Patroller
2024	Fast Talk with Boy Abunda	Guest
2024–2026	It's Showtime	Guest
2025	Pinoy Big Brother: Celebrity Collab Edition 2.0	Houseguest
2026	Kumusta	Herself

=== TV specials ===
Year	Title	Role	Notes
2021	Andito Tayo Para Sa Isa't Isa	Herself	ABS-CBN Christmas Special 2021
2022	Tayo Ang Ligaya ng Isa't Isa	Herself	ABS-CBN Christmas Special 2022
2023	Pasko ang Pinakamagandang Kwento	Herself	ABS-CBN Christmas Special 2023

== Awards and nominations ==
Year	Award	Category	Nominated Work	Result	Ref.
2018	5th Inding-indie Short Film Festival	Gawad Puso ng Sining - Huwarang Aktres sa Telebisyon	Kadenang Ginto	Won	
2019	5th Alta Media Icon Award	Most Promising Female Star	Kadenang Ginto	Won	
2019	1st VP Choice Awards	Love Team of the Year (with Kyle Echarri)	Kadenang Ginto	Nominated	
2019	Anak TV Seal Awards	Makabata Stars	—N/a	Won	
2020	2nd VP Choice Awards	Promising Female Star of the Year		Won	
2020	2nd VP Choice Awards	Love Team of the Year (with Kyle Echarri)		Won	
2020	6th RAWR Awards	Love Team of the Year (with Kyle Echarri)		Won	
2020	51st Box Office Entertainment Award	Most Promising Female Star For Television	Kadenang Ginto	Won	
2020	Edukcircle Awards	Outstanding Social Media Personality of the Year (with Andrea Brillantes, Seth Fedelin & Kyle Echarri)	—N/a	Won	
2021	3rd VP Choice Awards	TV Actress of the Year	Huwag Kang Mangamba	Nominated	
2021	4th Gawad Lasallianeta	Most Outstanding Performance by an Actress in a Filipino Film	Tenement 66	Nominated	
2021	6th PUSH Awards	Popular Love Team of the Year (with Kyle Echarri)		Nominated	
2022	24th Gawad PASADO	PinakaPASADOng Katuwang na Aktres 2021	Tenement 66	Won	
2022	3rd Gawad Balisong	Outstanding Filipino Gamechangers of 2022		Nominated	
2023	Perpetualites' Choice Award 2023	Best Young Female Media Personality		Won	
2023	Gawad Pilipino	Outstanding Female Actress on Television of the Year		Won	
2023	Gawad Parangal Awards - 12th KAKAMMPI OFW	Love Team of the Year (with Seth Fedelin)		Won	
2023	Anak TV Award 2023	Makabata Stars - Female Television Category		Won	
2023	Anak TV Award 2023	Net Makabata Stars - Female Online Category		Won	
2023	4th Asian Business Excellence Award 2023	Outstanding Young Actress		Won	
2023	TikTok Awards PH 2023	Celebrity Creator of the Year		Won	
2023	4th VP Choice Awards	VP Cover of the Year		Won	
2023	4th VP Choice Awards	Love Team of the Year (with Seth Fedelin)		Nominated	
2023	Asia's Royalty Awards	Most Admirable and Popular Female Actress of the Year		Won	
2024	Perpetualites' Choice Awards	Best Young Female Media Personality		Won	
2024	Anak TV Awards	Net Makabata Stars 2024		Won	
2024	Metro Manila Film Festival	Best Actress	My Future You	Nominated	
2024	Metro Manila Film Festival	Breakthrough Performance	My Future You	Nominated	
2025	2025 Manila International Film Festival	Best Actress	My Future You	Nominated	
2025	37th PMPC Star Awards for Television	German Moreno Power Tandem of the Year (with Seth Fedelin)	Dirty Linen	Won	
2025	27th Gawad Pasado	PinakaPASADOng Dangal ng Kabataan (with Seth Fedelin)		Won	
2025	41st PMPC Star Awards for Movies	Loveteam of The Year (with Seth Fedelin)	My Future You	Won	
2025	14th Kakammpi OFW Gawad Parangal	Best Loveteam of The Year (with Seth Fedelin)		Won	

=== Listicles ===
Publisher	Listicle	Year	Result	Ref.
Preview Magazine	50 Most Influential for 2022	2022	Included	
