= Kyle Echarri =

Filipino actor and singer (born 2003)

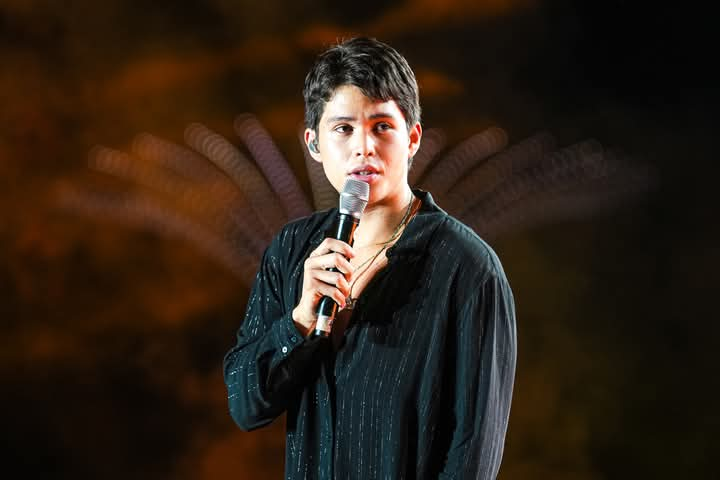
- Echarri at the 2025 KanLahi Festival in Tarlac
- Born: Kyle John Paradillo Echarri; June 20, 2003 (age 23); Orange County, California, U.S.
- Citizenship: Filipino; American
- Occupations: Actor; singer
- Years active: 2015–present
- Agents: Star Magic; Cornerstone Entertainment
- Musical career
- Labels: Star Music; MCA Music

Kyle John Paradillo Echarri (born June 20, 2003) is a Filipino actor, model, and musician. He first gained recognition as a semi-finalist in the second season of the talent competition show The Voice Kids in 2015. Echarri released his debut album It's Me Kyle the following year and later branched into acting on screen and stage. His popularity increased for his role in the melodrama series Kadenang Ginto (2018). Echarri has received various accolades, including a Box Office Entertainment Award and a Star Award for Music, as well as three Awit Awards nominations.

== Early life ==
Kyle John Paradillo Echarri was born on June 20, 2003 in Orange County, California to Filipino parents Jose Echarri and Marie Paradillo. His family moved to Cebu City, Philippines, in June 2014. His father is of Filipino and Basque ancestries. He has an older brother named Anthony, and had a younger sister named Isabella "Bella" Rae who was born in 2011 and died in 2023 due to complications from a brain tumor.

== Music career ==
=== 2015–2017: Career beginnings ===
Echarri rose to prominence at 11 years old with his first television appearance as a contestant on season 2 of The Voice Kids, where he reached the Top 6 under Sarah Geronimo's team. Just six seconds into his blind audition, while singing One Direction's "Night Changes", coaches Bamboo Mañalac and Sarah Geronimo turned for the then 11-year-old Cebuano footballer, who chose to be part of Team Sarah.

Echarri released his first full-length studio album, It's Me Kyle, on August 26, 2016, under MCA Music, a Universal Music Group company in the Philippines. His carrier single, "Fall For Me" peaked at Number 4 on Myx's Pinoy Myx Countdown and remained on the charts for more than 14 weeks. In 2016, Echarri opened the Manila Tour show for American singer, songwriter, and YouTube viral-hit artist Greyson Chance. In January 2017, he was part of the lineup for Fusion 2017, a Philippine music festival highlighting Original Pilipino Music, alongside other Filipino artists such as Sarah Geronimo, Bamboo Mañalac, Aegis, 6cyclemind, Gabby Alipe, Autotelic, Yeng Constantino, Lyca Gairanod, Zendee, James Reid, and Nadine Lustre. The Philippine Daily Inquirer compared his talents to those of Justin Bieber.

=== 2018–2019: Rising popularity ===
In 2018, Echarri joined Star Pop, Star Music's record sublabel targeting a younger market. He released the single "Pangako," which was soon followed by a music video. He first performed the song live at the Myx Music Awards 2018 held at the Araneta Coliseum and launched it on radio through MOR 101.9. The single quickly entered the daily top hits survey, MOR Pinoy Biga10, and remained on the charts for weeks. Following the success of "Pangako," he released his second album EP, Kyle Echarri, on October 13, 2018.

Echarri became a member of the teen pop group ASAP G!, alongside Isabela Vinzon, Jayda Avanzado, Ylona Garcia, Jeremy Glinoga, and Darren Espanto. The group was formed on June 3, 2018, and disbanded in November 2018 when the show was reformatted into ASAP Natin 'To.

He was launched as part of the Star Magic Circle, alongside Belle Mariano, Jeremiah Lisbo, and other rising stars. He also collaborated with Singaporean artist Haven, marking the first international collaboration between Star Pop Star Music Philippines, Academy of Rock Singapore, and Cornerstone Music. They released the song "Imagine."

He also became part of the "Gold Squad," which refers to the four teen stars of the top-rated series Kadenang Ginto: Francine Diaz, Andrea Brillantes, and Seth Fedelin, and himself. In 2019, the Gold Squad members debuted their first album under Star Music, titled The Gold Squad - EP. The album consisted of five tracks, including their dance craze song "Halo Halo." They also released four new music videos, including a new video for Echarri's breakout hit song "Pangako," featuring his on-screen partner Francine Diaz.

=== 2020–present: singer-songwriter, producer, collaborations ===
Echarri continues to make music, releasing multiple songs. In 2020, he released his latest single, "I'm Serious." He wrote the lyrics and music for the track and produced it under Star POP with the guidance and supervision of label head Rox Santos. This release marked his first successful solo project as a singer-songwriter. The song won the People's Choice Award for Dance Recording of the Year at the 13th PMPC Star Awards for Music.

Echarri was also part of the 11th edition of Himig Handog 2020. He was chosen to perform the song "Kahit Na Masungit," alongside singer Jeremy Glinoga. The song, written and composed by John Francis and Jayson Franz Pasicolan, ranked second out of all the finalists.

In 2021, Echarri released his latest album, New Views, which is his first self-produced album. According to the artist, he did not approach the project with a specific theme or vibe in mind. Instead, he aimed to showcase his versatility, as evidenced by the diverse slate of songs on the album, ranging from R&B to Latin-inspired trap sounds. The album consists of seven tracks and includes collaborations with various artists, such as longtime friend Darren Espanto, who co-wrote "Fuego"; Gold Squad members Seth Fedelin and Andrea Brillantes, who co-wrote "Liligawan Na Kita"; and rapper Arvey. The album hit number 1 in Digital Sales for Original Pinoy Music (OPM) in the Philippines a day after its release and reached number 4 on the iTunes Philippines Top 100 Albums. Echarri also announced on Instagram that he would be holding a free virtual concert, streamed live on his Kumu channel on his 18th birthday, where he would perform songs from New Views. His fancon featured special guests such as Zephanie Dimaranan, AC Bonifacio, Darren Espanto, and Moira Dela Torre.

In 2022, Echarri, alongside his friend Markus Paterson and Moophs, released their first collaboration titled "Hotel Room" under Tarsier Records. The track features a deep R&B vibe, combining soulful lyrics and vocals with a neo-soul beat. A month after the release of "Hotel Room," Echarri collaborated again with Tarsier Records and Moophs, releasing a new single titled "Cupid's Aim."

He was also featured in Jonathan Manalo’s four official soundtrack volumes for the musical series Lyric and Beat. His singles included "It’s Okay Not To Be Okay," co-written by Angela Ken; "Let It Loose," co-written by Marion Aunor; and his rendition of Gary V’s “What U Want,” featuring Sheena Belarmino.

In 2023, Echarri was featured on Troy Laureta's latest album, which includes fresh covers of Original Pilipino Music (OPM) classics and contemporary hits. He performed a rendition of Pilita Corrales' song "Kapantay Ay Langit," alongside Josefina Sylveria.

== Career ==
=== 2015–2017: Acting debut ===
Kyle Echarri made his theatrical debut as Master Kundoktor in Ako Ay Si Josephine, a musical show featuring the hits of Filipino pop-rock singer-songwriter Yeng Constantino. In December 2016, he was cast in Ballet Philippines' Awitin Mo at Isasayaw Ko, a new dance musical featuring the songs of VST & Co., at the Cultural Center of the Philippines Main Theater (Tanghalang Nicanor Abelardo). He played the role of Lito, alternated by Noel Comia. The production included legendary dancers Edna Vida and Nonoy Froilan, BP mainstays Denise Parungao, Garry Corpuz, Rita Angela Winder, and Jean Marc Cordero. For the vocal parts, ABS-CBN stars Karylle, Michael Pangilinan, and Markki Stroem performed, along with an alternate cast including Cooky Chua, Sandino Martin, Jef Flores, and Noel Comia Jr.

After season 2 of The Voice Kids, Kyle was cast in the top-rated ABS-CBN teleserye On the Wings of Love as Brent Wyatt, the half-brother of Nadine Lustre's character Leah Olivar, in 2015. In May 2016, he joined ABS-CBN's Filipino reality music competition show We Love OPM, hosted by Anne Curtis. Alongside teammates Bailey May and Juan Karlos Labajo, he was mentored by crooner Richard Poon. We Love OPM: The Celebrity Sing-Offs ran for three months, from May to July 2016. He was also a member of the boy group Voice Next Door. In 2017, he played the role of Gio in an MMK episode entitled "Cellphone." In 2018, he was cast as Miguel in another MMK episode titled "Hapagkainan."

=== 2018–2022: Breakthrough, The Gold Squad, Pinoy Big Brother, Venturing Solo ===
In 2018, Echarri was cast as Kristoff "Tope" Tejada in ABS-CBN's top-rated daytime Philippine drama Kadenang Ginto. The success of the series led to the formation of The Gold Squad, a teenage quartet consisting of Kyle, Francine, Andrea, and Seth, who are among this generation's most popular young actors. The Gold Squad's success was further recognized when they received the Outstanding Social Media Personalities of the Year award from EdukCircle in 2020. Echarri's loveteam with Francine Diaz, known as KyCine, became a viewer favorite and was awarded Best Loveteam of the Year 2020 at the LionHeart TV Rawr Awards in 2019. The Gold Squad starred in several series and films.

In 2020, Echarri and Diaz, known as KyCine, starred in the iWantTFC digital movie Silly Red Shoes, directed by James Robin Mayo. They were also cast in Bawal Lumabas: The Series, now available on Netflix under the English title Her Rules, Her No's, alongside leading actress Kim Chiu.

In 2021, Echarri became one of the main cast of Huwag Kang Mangamba, a primetime inspirational teleserye hit, starring alongside the Gold Squad members and other well-known veteran actors in the country. He was also one of the leading cast of Click, Like, Share a four-part digital anthology series with four different episodes. Echarri's episode in Season 1, with actress Danica Ontengco, was titled Reroute.

==== Pinoy Big Brother: Kumunity Season 10 ====
In the same year, Echarri entered as a housemate of Kumunity Season 10's Celebrity Edition, having previously entered as a houseguest with the Gold Squad in Otso. He was the fourth celebrity evictee of the edition.

==== New Solo Projects ====
In February 2022, just after Pinoy Big Brother: Kumunity Season 10, Echarri was added to the main cast for a youth-oriented musical romantic comedy-drama streaming television series Lyric and Beat directed by Dolly Dulu. The series premiered on August 10 to September 23, 2022, on iWantTFC. This series pays tribute to the "20 years of music" of ABS-CBN Music's creative director Jonathan Manalo. The show also marked as Echarri's first solo project without the benefit of a love team partner.

Echarri had his first solo leading role in Beach Bros. A youth-oriented comedy-drama streaming television miniseries by Dreamscape Entertainment, directed by Victor Kaiba Villanueva, which premiered from July 16 to 31, 2022, on iWantTFC.

In November 2022, Echarri was cast to play the young "Apollo" Adelantar in the primetime action series The Iron Heart, starring lead actor Richard Gutierrez as his counterpart. He was paired up with Karina Bautista as the young "Cassandra", played by award-winning actress, Maja Salvador as her counterpart.

=== 2023–present: Transition to Leading Man Roles and Continued Success ===
In May 2023, Echarri was announced to be part of a teen drama television series Senior High. He was one of the main cast of the show and was reunited with fellow Gold Squad member Andrea Brillantes under Dreamscape Entertainment production. He played the character of Robert "Obet" G. Santana. The series aired from August 28, 2023, to January 19, 2024, on Primetime TV.

In December 2023, while still filming for his show Senior High, Echarri was announced by ABS-CBN to star in a new television series Pamilya Sagrado alongside award-winning actor Piolo Pascual, and Grae Fernandez. He played the character of Moises "Moi" Malonzo wherein he won his first Best Actor award in a television series in the 21st Gawad Tanglaw Awards. The series is one of the final projects that was executively produced by famous veteran producer Roldeo "Deo" Endrinal before his death on February 3, 2024. The series aired from June 17-November 15, 2025 on Primetime TV.

After the success of the show Pamilya Sagrado, Echarri and Pascual were set to top-bill in an action-drama film for the first time. They will star in the movie titled The Ride. The film is about a father and son on the run. After 2+ years in the making, the movie was released on September 24, 2025. On the night of the movie premiere, Echarri was very emotional watching himself pull off the last scene. The young actor shared that he had to film his last heavy drama scene the day before he found out that his little sister has died.

In June 2025, there were two projects announcement that were lined up for Echarri that got fans excited. He was set to join Bela Padilla and JC Santos for the long-awaited movie sequel of 100 Tula Para Kay Stella, entitled 100 Awit Para Kay Stella. He was handpicked and perfectly cast for the role of Clyde Pelayo according to Padilla. The movie was released on September 10, 2025.

The young actor was also announce to star in the drama anthology Maalaala Mo Kaya. Echarri alongside promising young actress-singer Kai Montinola were set to portray the real-life story of TikTok content creators Hajie Alejandro and Lenie Aycardo, also known as Team Hanie. The show was aired on June 21, 2025, and received positive feedback from viewers. It may have been Echarri and Montinola's first team up on screen, but they have managed to spark an effortless chemistry according to netizens.

In August 2025, during the annual trade launch event, ABS-CBN announced that two of the most sought-after young leading men are joining forces for a new series. Echarri was announced to lead this new project alongside Donny Pangilinan, who he'll work with for the first time. While this will be their first project together, off-screen, the two are well known to be good friends. The upcoming action-drama series will top bill a star studded cast. The series entitled Roja is produced by Dreamscape Entertainment. The series was originally going to release on October 17, 18, and 20, 2025, respectively. However, it was moved to November 21, 2025, on Netflix, and iWant the following day, due to production delay.

In 2026, Echarri guested on the fourth season of Everybody, Sing!.

== Filmography ==
Key
†	Denotes films that have not yet been released

=== Film ===
Year	Title	Role	Notes	Ref.
2017	Seven Sundays	Marc Bonifacio	Supporting Role	
2019	Silly Red Shoes	Chuck Cabrera	Lead Role	
2025	100 Awit Para Kay Stella	Clyde Pelayo	Supporting Role	
2025	The Ride	Leo	Main Role	
2026	18th Rose	Jordan	Lead Role	
2026	Remember		Supporting role	
2027	First Sem †	Joms	Main Role	

=== Television ===
Year	Title	Role	Notes	Ref.
2015–2016	On the Wings of Love	Brent Wyatt	Supporting Role	
2016	Maalaala Mo Kaya: Boxing Ring	Bully	Supporting Role	
2017	Maalaala Mo Kaya: Cellphone	Gio	Supporting Role	
2018	Maalaala Mo Kaya: Hapagkainan	Miguel	Supporting Role	
2018	Kadenang Ginto	Kristoffer "Tope / Kristoff" Tejada	Supporting Role	
2019	Mellow Myx	Himself	Celebrity VJ	
2019	My Myx	Himself	Celebrity VJ	
2019	Pinoy Myx	Himself	Celebrity VJ	
2019	Pop Myx	Himself	Celebrity VJ	
2020	Bawal Lumabas: The Series	Kevin Ramos	Supporting Role	
2021	Huwag Kang Mangamba	Rafael "Rafa" Advincula	Main Role	
2021	Click, Like, Share: Reroute	Brennan	Lead Role	
2022	Beach Bros	Dave Alon	Main Role	
2022	Lyric and Beat	Grae Madrigal	Supporting Role	
2022–2023	The Iron Heart	Young Apollo Adelantar	Supporting Role	
2023–2024	Senior High	Robert "Obet" G. Santana	Main Role	
2024	Pamilya Sagrado	Moises "Moi" Malonzo	Main Role	
2025	Maalaala Mo Kaya: Makeup	Hajie Alejandro	Lead Role	
2025–2026	Roja	Olsen Bonifacio	Main Role	

=== Theatre ===
Year	Title	Role	Venue	Ref.
2016	Ako Ay Si Josephine	Master Kundoktor	PETA Theater	
2016	Awitin Mo at Isasayaw Ko	Lito	CCP Main Theater	

== Awards and nominations ==
Awards and nominations received by Kyle Echarri
Year	Award	Category	Nominated Work	Result	Ref.
2017	Push Awards	Song Cover of the Year	"Bahala Na" cover (with AC Bonifacio)	Nominated	
2017	Awit Awards	Best Performance by a New Male Recording Artist	"Fall for Me"	Nominated	
2017	Awit Awards	Best Ballad Recording	"Fall for Me"	Nominated	
2018	Star Awards for Movies	New Movie Actor of the Year	Seven Sundays	Nominated	
2019	Push Awards	Male Celebrity of the Year	Kyle Echarri	Nominated	
2019	1st VP Choice Awards	Love Team of the Year with Francine Diaz	Kadenang Ginto	Nominated	
2020	2nd VP Choice Awards	Love Team of the Year (with Francine Diaz)	Kadenang Ginto	Won	
2020	6th RAWR Awards	Love Team of the Year (with Francine Diaz)	Kadenang Ginto	Won	
2020	51st Box Office Entertainment Award	Most Promising Male Star For Television	Kadenang Ginto	Won	
2020	Edukcircle Awards	Outstanding Social Media Personality of the Year (with Francine Diaz, Andrea Brillantes & Seth Fedelin)	—N/a	Won	
2020	Myx Music Awards	Myx Celebrity VJ of the Year	Kyle Echarri	Nominated	
2021	3rd VP Choice Awards	Love Team of the Year with Francine Diaz		Nominated	
2021	Push Awards	Popular Love Team of the Year with Francine Diaz		Nominated	
2022	Awit Awards	Favorite Male Artist of the Year	Kyle Echarri	Nominated	
2022	13th PMPC Star Awards	People's Choice Dance Recording of the Year	"I'm Serious"	Won	
2022	Push Awards	Inspiring Digital Star and Popular Loveteam of the year with Francine Diaz		Won	
2023	RAWR Awards	Loveteam of the Year with Andrea Brillantes		Nominated	
2023	Awit Award	Best Collaboration and Best Original Track Records	Lyric and Beat	Nominated	
2024	Anak TV Awards	Makabata Stars for Male		Nominated	
2024	5th VP Choice Awards	TV Actor of the Year (Primetime)	Pamilya Sagrado	Nominated	
2025	Anak TV Seal Awards 2025	Net Makabata Stars for Male		Won	
2025	21st Gawad Tanglaw Award	Best Actor (For Radio and Television)	Pamilya Sagrado	Won	

== Discography ==
=== Studio albums ===
List of studio albums, with selected details
Title	Album details	Ref(s)
It's Me, Kyle	Released: September 23, 2016; Label: MCA Music; Formats: CD, digital download, streaming	
Kyle Echarri	Released: October 13, 2018; Label: Star Music; Formats: digital download, streaming	
New Views	Released: June 18, 2021; Label: Star Music; Formats: digital download, streaming	

=== Extended plays ===
Extended plays, with selected details
Title	EP details	Ref(s)
The Gold Squad	Released: June 30, 2019; Label: Star Music; Formats: digital download, streaming	

=== Singles ===
==== As lead artist ====
List of singles as lead artist, showing year released, selected chart positions, and associated albums
Year	Title	Peak chart positions		Album	Ref
Year	Title	PHL	TPS	Album	Ref
2015	"Fall For Me"	—	—	It's Me, Kyle	
2017	"Our Moment"	—	—	It's Me, Kyle	
2018	"Pangako"	75	—	Kyle Echarri and The Gold Squad	
2019	"Imagine" (with Haven)	—	—	Non-album single	
2020	"I'm Serious"	—	—	New Views	
2020	"Kahit Na Masungit" (with Jeremy G)	—	—	Himig Handog (11th Edition)	
2020	"Panaginip"	—	—	New Views and Click, Like, Share (Original Soundtrack)	
2021	"Liligawan Na Kita" (with Seth Fedelin)	—	—	New Views	
2021	"Dyosa"	—	—	New Views	
2022	"Hotel Room" (with Markus and Moophs)	—	—	Non-album singles	
2022	"Cupid's Aim" (with Moophs)	—	—	Non-album singles	
2025	"Iisang Daan" (with Rob Deniel)	—	—	100 Awit Para Kay Stella (OST)	
2025	"Nakupo"	—	—	100 Awit Para Kay Stella (OST)	
2025	"Lipstick Na Itim"	—	—	100 Awit Para Kay Stella (OST)	

=== Other appearances ===
Title	Year	Album
"Got To Believe In Magic"	2015	The Voice Kids Season 2 (The Album)
"Hero"	2015	The Voice Kids Season 2 (The Album)
"Little Drummer Boy"	2015	My Christmas Album All Stars
"Lyric & Beat" (with the cast of Lyric and Beat)	2022	Lyric and Beat, Vol. 01 (Original Soundtrack)
"It's Okay Not To Be Okay"	2022	Lyric and Beat (Original Soundtrack Vol. 03)
"What U Want"	2022	Lyric and Beat (Original Soundtrack Vol. 04)
"Let It Loose"	2022	Lyric and Beat (Original Soundtrack Vol. 04)
"Kapantay ay Langit" (Troy Laureta featuring Kyle Echarri and Josefina Silveyra)	2023	Dalamhati: A Troy Laureta OPM Collective, Vol. 3

== See also ==
- List of Philippine actors
- Television in the Philippines
