= Seth Fedelin =

Filipino actor (born 2002)

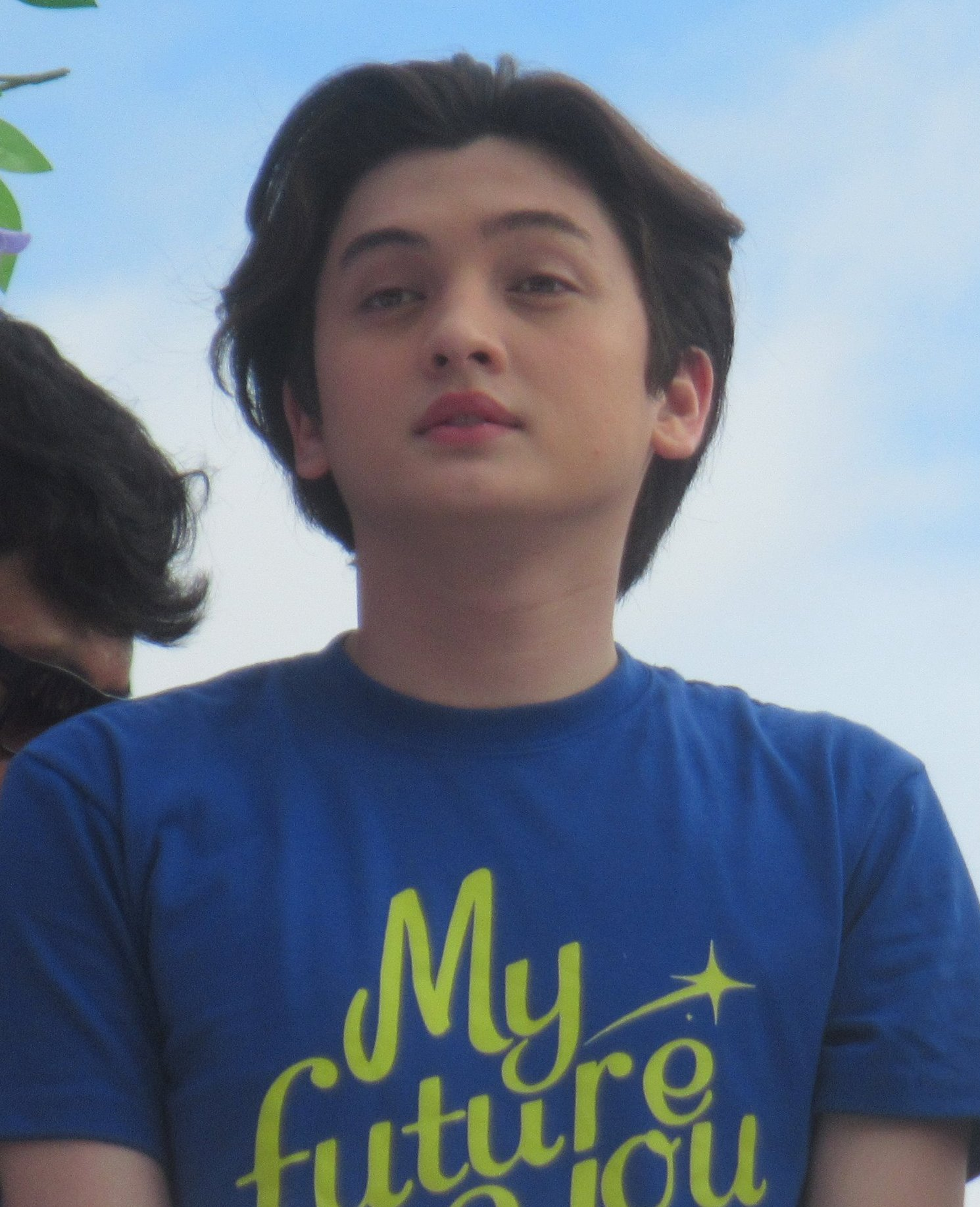
- Fedelin in 2024
- Born: Seth Yancy Fronda Fedelin; July 9, 2002 (age 24); Dasmariñas, Cavite, Philippines
- Occupations: Actor; singer
- Years active: 2018–present
- Agent: Star Magic
- Notable work: Kadenang Ginto; My Future You
- Height: 1.75 m (5 ft 9 in)
- Partner: Andrea Brillantes (2019–2021)

Seth Yancy Fronda Fedelin (born July 9, 2002) is a Filipino actor and singer. Fedelin first appeared on television as a housemate on the reality show Pinoy Big Brother: Otso (2018). He has since appeared in various films and television series, such as Kadenang Ginto (2019), Huwag Kang Mangamba (2021), and Dirty Linen (2023). He also starred in My Future You, an official entry to the 50th Metro Manila Film Festival on December 25, 2024, and won two awards: Breakthrough Performance in the MMFF Gabi Ng Parangal held at Solaire Grand Ballroom in Parañaque City and Best Actor at Manila International Film Festival held in Los Angeles, California.

== Early life and education ==
Fedelin was born on July 9, 2002, in Dasmariñas, Cavite to Richard and Marga Fedelin both from Concepcion, Romblon. He is the eldest son among his siblings. He has one younger brother and one younger sister. He speaks Filipino, Bantoanon, and English.

He graduated in junior high school at Dasmariñas Integrated High School in 2019 and completed senior high school at Jesus Son of Mary Academy in 2024 wherein he puts off his schooling for three years because of his busy work schedule.

== Acting career ==
In 2018, Fedelin participated as the Hope Pool Son of Cavite in the first batch of Pinoy Big Brother: Otso as a housemate. He is the first male housemate to enter and the last male housemate to leave the house after he was evicted in the last eviction (Day 57 - January 2019) of the first batch earning the 5th place. The Big 4 slot went to Kaori Oinuma, Karina Bautista, Jelay Pilones, and Lie Reposposa.

In 2019, months after being evicted in Pinoy Big Brother, Fedelin starred in the psychological horror film, Abandoned, with Beauty Gonzalez. He then became a part of Kadenang Ginto and landed a role as Mikoy Sarmiento, who is the love interest of Marga Mondragon played by Andrea Brillantes. Thus, SethDrea loveteam was formed. Because of the success of Kadenang Ginto, the Gold Squad was formed. Fedelin together with his co-stars in Kadenang Ginto, Andrea Brillantes, Kyle Echarri, and Francine Diaz became the members of the squad.

In 2020, after Kadenang Ginto ended, the Gold Squad starred in Huwag Kang Mangamba with award-winning actresses, Eula Valdez and Sylvia Sanchez. They also starred in season 1 of Click, Like, Share, where Fedelin acted alongside Jimuel Pacquiao, the son of the former professional boxer, Manny Pacquiao, in the episode Trending.

In 2021, Fedelin, together with Andrea Brillantes, starred in an iQiyi series, Saying Goodbye with Kobie Brown, Andi Abaya and Nio Tria, the son of actress Cherry Pie Picache.

In 2022, he starred in Lyric and Beat with Andrea Brillantes, Darren Espanto, AC Bonifacio, Kyle Echarri, Angela Ken, Jeremy Glinoga and Sheena Belarmino. It was disclosed by Andrea Brillantes that she and Fedelin had maintained a private relationship spanning over two years. This is the last series of Fedelin and Brillantes after both of their loveteam and real life relationship ended.

In 2023, the pairing of Francine Diaz and Seth Fedelin were tested for the first time with their new drama series Dirty Linen by ABS-CBN and Dreamscape Entertainment in 2023. The loveteam called FranSeth were formed and both of them starred in the series called Fractured with Kaori Oinuma, Jeremiah Lisbo, Daniela Stranner, Raven Rigor, and Sean Tristan. The story is about a group of influencers who finds themselves trapped in a disappointing island resort.

In 2024, FranSeth debuted in the 50th Metro Manila Film Festival with their first-ever movie together, My Future You. The film received 10 nominations and won four awards, including Best Director, Best Editing, and 3rd Best picture, wherein Fedelin won the Breakthrough Performance in the Gabi Ng Parangal.

In 2025, Fedelin won the Best Actor award at 2025 Manila International Film Festival held at Los Angeles, California for the movie My Future You. He also starred in a series called Sins of the Father with Gerald Anderson, Shaina Magdayao, Jessy Mendiola, JC de Vera, RK Bagatsing, and Francine Diaz. He then starred in Shake, Rattle & Roll Evil Origins, an official entry to the 51st 2025 Metro Manila Film Festival, with Francine Diaz, Fyang Smith, JM Ibarra, Manilyn Reynes and many more.

In 2026, Fedelin starred in the movie She Who Must Not Be Named with Francine Diaz, Bobby Andrews, Ruby Ruiz, Kat Galang, Elijah Alejo, Raven Rigor, Abdul Raman, Kaleb Ong, and Kych Minemoto.

== Personal life ==
Fedelin had previously dated his past on-screen partner Andrea Brillantes from 2019 to 2021 which he met while filming the hit series Kadenang Ginto.

== Discography ==
=== Singles ===
- Kahit Na Anong Sabihin Ng Iba (The Gold Squad EP, 2019, Star Music)
- Mamahalin Kita Palagi Lagi (2019, Star Music)
- Liligawan Na Kita with Kyle Echarri (New Views, 2021, Star Music)
- Kundi Ikaw (his new single in 2022, Star Music)

=== Music videos ===
Year	Title	Performed by:	Label	Ref
2019	Kahit Na Anong Sabihin Ng Iba	Himself	Star Music	
2021	Binibini (with Andrea Brillantes)	Zack Tabudlo	Island Records Philippines	
2021	Liligawan Na Kita (with Kyle Echarri)	Kyle Echarri & Himself	Star Music	
2021	Andito Tayo Para Sa Isa’t Isa	Belle Mariano, Donny Pangilinan, Martin Nievera, Piolo Pascual, Gary Valenciano, Zsazsa Padilla, Erik Santos, KZ Tandingan, Kathryn Bernardo, Daniel Padilla, Sarah Geronimo, Sharon Cuneta, Vice Ganda, Regine Velasquez, Ogie Alcasid, Iñigo Pascual, Andrea Brillantes, BGYO, Darren Espanto, & Himself	Star Music	
2022	Muli (with Francine Diaz & Ace Banzuelo)	Ace Banzuelo	Sony Music Philippines	
2022	Kundi Ikaw	Himself	Star Music	
2022	Tayo Ang Ligaya ng Isa’t Isa	Belle Mariano, Donny Pangilinan, Alexa Ilacad, KD Estrada, Jane de Leon, Janella Salvador, Joshua Garcia, Daniel Padilla, Kathryn Bernardo, Ogie Alcasid, Anne Curtis, Kim Chiu, Martin Nievera, Zsa Zsa Padilla, Sarah Geronimo, Gary Valenciano, Regine Velasquez-Alcasid, Jolina Magdangal, Melai Cantiveros, AC Bonifacio, Andrea Brillantes, Francine Diaz, Darren Espanto, Kyle Echarri, Jed Madela, Klarisse de Guzman, Morissette, Angeline Quinto, Erik Santos, KZ Tandingan, Elha Nympha, Khimo Gumatay, Anji Salvacion, Bailey May, Piolo Pascual, Chito Miranda, Moira dela Torre, Sharon Cuneta, the DYCI Dagalak Choir, & Himself	Star Music	
2024	Tayo Na Lang (with Francine Diaz)	Nobita	Sony Music Philippines	
2024	Tunay (with Francine Diaz); Note: Recording Only	Francine Diaz & Himself	Star Magic	
2024	Iba Ka (with Francine Diaz)	Himself	Star Music	
2024	Night Calls	Himself	Star Music	

== Acting credits ==
Key
†	Denotes shows that have not yet been aired

=== Film ===
Seth Fedelin's film credits with year of release, film titles and roles
Year	Title	Role	Notes	Ref.
2019	Abandoned	RJ	Main Role	
2019	Wild Little Love	Jake A. Cruz	Lead Role	
2019	The Mall, the Merrier!	cameo		
2024	My Future You	Alexander "Lex" Ramos	Lead Role, MMFF 2024 entry	
2025	Shake, Rattle & Roll: Evil Origins	Sean	Main Role, MMFF 2025 entry	
2026	She Who Must Not Be Named	James Richard Montefalco	Lead Role	

=== Television ===
Year	Title	Role	Notes	Ref.
2019–2020	Kadenang Ginto	Michael "Mikoy" Sarmiento	Supporting Role	
2020	Maalaala Mo Kaya: Ilog	Arian	Lead Role	
2020–2021	FPJ's Ang Probinsyano	Macoy	Supporting Role	
2021	Huwag Kang Mangamba	Pio Estopacio	Main Role	
2021	Click, Like, Share: Trending	Cocoy	Lead Role, iWantTFC	
2021	Saying Goodbye	Ricky	Lead Role, iQIYI	
2022	Lyric and Beat	Beat	Lead Role, iWantTFC	
2023	Dirty Linen	Nicolas "Nico" M. Sinag	Main Role	
2023	Fractured	Oca	Lead Role, iWantTFC	
2025	Sins of the Father	Lorenzo "Enzo" Rivera	Main Role	

=== Microdramas ===
Year	Title	Role	Notes	Ref.
2026	A Cake to Remember	Landon Cardenas	Lead Role, iWantTFC	

=== Variety, talk, reality and game shows ===
Year	Title	Role
2018–2019	Pinoy Big Brother: Otso	Housemate
2019	Pinoy Big Brother: Otso	Guest Housemate with Gold Squad
2019–present	ASAP XP	Guest
2022	Magandang Buhay	Guest
2023	It's Showtime	Guest
2023	It's Your Lucky Day	Co-Host
2024	Fast Talk with Boy Abunda	Guest
2024	It's Showtime	Guest
2024	TV Patrol	Celebrity Star Patroller
2024	TiktoClock	Guest
2025	It's Showtime	Guest
2025	Rainbow Rumble	Contestant
2025	Pinoy Big Brother: Celebrity Collab Edition 2.0	Houseguest

== Accolades ==
Awards and NominationsAwards and nominations received by Seth Fedelin
Year	Award giving body	Category	Nominated work	Results	Ref.
2019	VP Choice Awards	VP Spotlight of the Year	—N/a	Won	
2019	VP Choice Awards	Loveteam of the Year (with Andrea Brillantes)	Kadenang Ginto	Nominated	
2019	Alta Media Icon Awards	Most Promising Male Star	Kadenang Ginto	Won	
2019	33rd PMPC Star Awards for Television	Best New Male TV Personality	Kadenang Ginto	Nominated	
2020	Edukcircle Awards	Outstanding Social Media Personality of the Year (with Andrea Brillantes, Francine Diaz & Kyle Echarri)	—N/a	Won	
2020	VP Choice Awards	Loveteam of the Year (with Andrea Brillantes)	—N/a	Nominated	
2020	51st Box Office Entertainment Awards	Most Promising Loveteam for Television (with Andrea Brillantes)	Kadenang Ginto	Won	
2020	Push Awards	Push Popular Love Team (with Andrea Brillantes)	—N/a	Nominated	
2021	VP Choice Awards	Loveteam of the Year (with Andrea Brillantes)	—N/a	Nominated	
2021	34th PMPC Star Awards for Television	German Moreno Power Tandem of the Year (with Andrea Brillantes)	Kadenang Ginto	Won	
2021	34th PMPC Star Awards for Television	Best Single Performance by an Actor	Maalaala Mo Kaya Episode - Ilog	Won	
2023	Gawad Parangal Awards - 12th KAKAMMPI OFW	Love Team of the Year (with Francine Diaz)	—N/a	Won	
2023	Anak TV Awards	Net Makabata Star 2023	—N/a	Won	
2024	Perpetualites' Choice Awards	Best Young Male Media Personality	—N/a	Won	
2024	Anak TV Awards	Net Makabata Star 2024	—N/a	Won	
2024	Metro Manila Film Festival	Best Actor	My Future You	Nominated	
2024	Metro Manila Film Festival	Breakthrough Performance	My Future You	Won	
2025	2025 Manila International Film Festival	Best Actor	My Future You	Won	
2025	37th PMPC Star Awards for Television	German Moreno Power Tandem of the Year (with Francine Diaz)	Dirty Linen	Won	
2025	27th Gawad Pasado	PinakaPASADOng Dangal ng Kabataan (with Francine Diaz)		Won	
2025	41st PMPC Star Awards for Movies	Actor of The Year	My Future You	Nominated	
2025	41st PMPC Star Awards for Movies	Loveteam of The Year (with Francine Diaz)	My Future You	Won	
2025	14th Kakammpi OFW Gawad Parangal	Best Loveteam of The Year (with Francine Diaz)		Won	

== See also ==
- Pinoy Big Brother: Otso
