= Kadenang Ginto =

2018–20 Philippine television drama series

- Title card
- Also known as: The Heiress
- Genre: Family drama; Melodrama; Crime; Revenge; Tragedy
- Created by: Joel S. Mercado; Danica Mae S. Domingo
- Written by: Rondel P. Lindayag
- Directed by: Jerry Lopez Sineneng (season 1); Avel E. Sunpongco; Joshua Ducasen (Editor, S1); Jojo A. Saguin; John S. Lapus (season 2–3); Darnel Joy R. Villaflor
- Starring: Beauty Gonzalez; Dimples Romana; Francine Diaz; Andrea Brillantes; Albert Martinez; Adrian Alandy
- Opening theme: "Nasa Puso" by Janine Berdin
- Composers: Jeremy Sarmiento; Jonathan Manalo
- Country of origin: Philippines
- Original language: Filipino
- No. of seasons: 3
- No. of episodes: 348 (list of episodes)

Production
- Executive producers: Carlo Katigbak; Cory Vidanes; Laurenti Dyogi; Roldeo T. Endrinal
- Producers: Rosselle "Beegee" Soldao-Gannaban; Cathy Magdael-Abarrondo; Carlina D. Dela Merced
- Production locations: Metro Manila, Philippines
- Running time: 28–39 minutes
- Production company: Dreamscape Entertainment

Original release
- Network: ABS-CBN
- Release: October 8, 2018 – February 7, 2020

Related
- Annaliza; Huwag Kang Mangamba; Dirty Linen; Senior High; High Street

Kadenang Ginto (transl. golden chain / international title: The Heiress) is a Philippine television drama series broadcast by ABS-CBN. Directed by Jerry Lopez Sineneng, Avel E. Sunpongco, Jojo A. Saguin, John S. Lapus and Darnel Joy R. Villaflor, it stars Beauty Gonzalez, Dimples Romana, Francine Diaz, Andrea Brillantes, Albert Martinez, and Adrian Alandy. It aired on the network's Kapamilya Gold line up and worldwide on TFC from October 8, 2018 to February 7, 2020.

The series is streaming online on YouTube.

== Premise ==
Kadenang Ginto is the story of Romina Andrada (Beauty Gonzalez), a secretary turned wife of business tycoon Robert Mondragon (Albert Martinez), who married her even though she was raped and was carrying the child of the assailant. Unknown to Romina, it was Daniela (Dimples Romana), Robert's daughter, who had orchestrated her abduction right before seducing Romina's fiancé, Carlos Bartolome (Adrian Alandy). With their lives intertwined, their daughters, Cassandra (Francine Diaz) and Margaret (Andrea Brillantes), are made to fight as to who is the rightful heiress to Robert's empire.

== Cast and characters ==
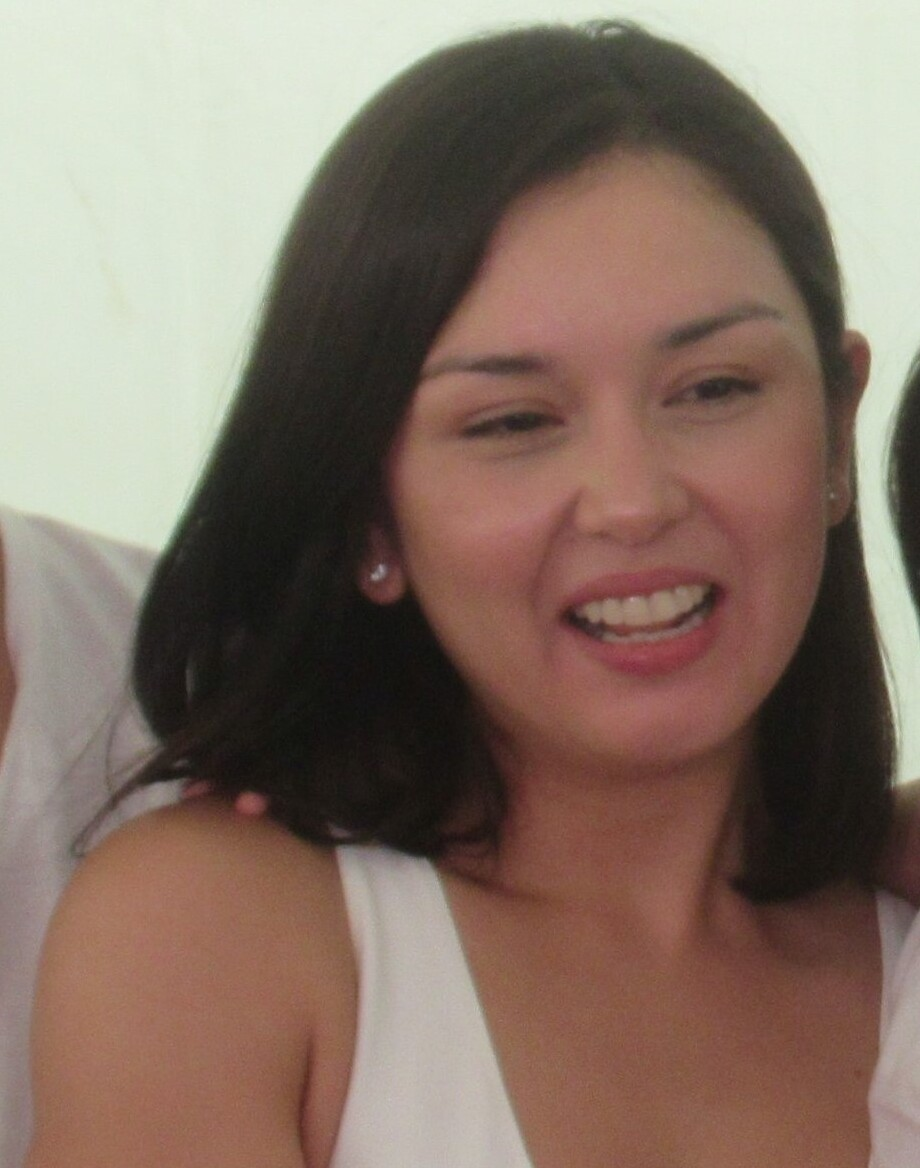
Beauty Gonzalez portrays Ma'am Romina Andrada-Mondragon

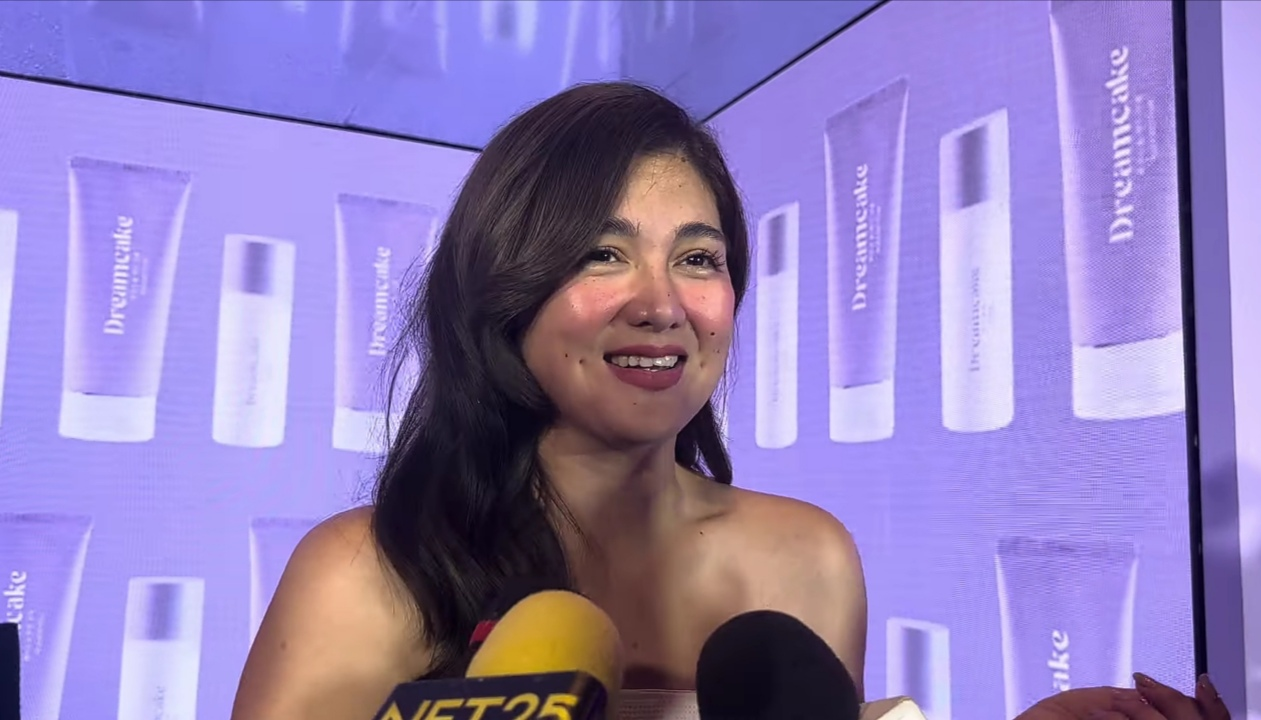
Dimples Romana portrays Daniela "Dani" Mondragon-Bartolome

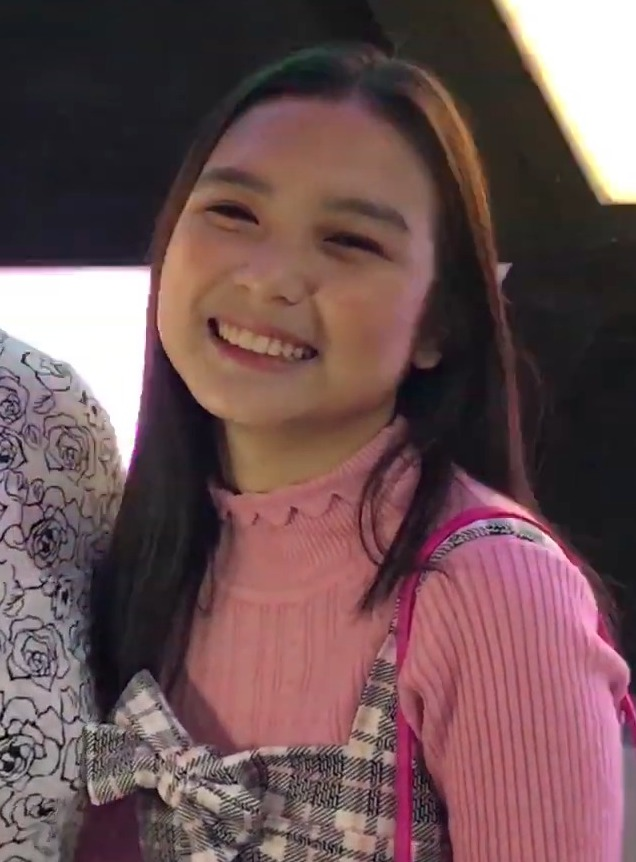
Francine Diaz portrays Cassandra "Cassie" A. Mondragon

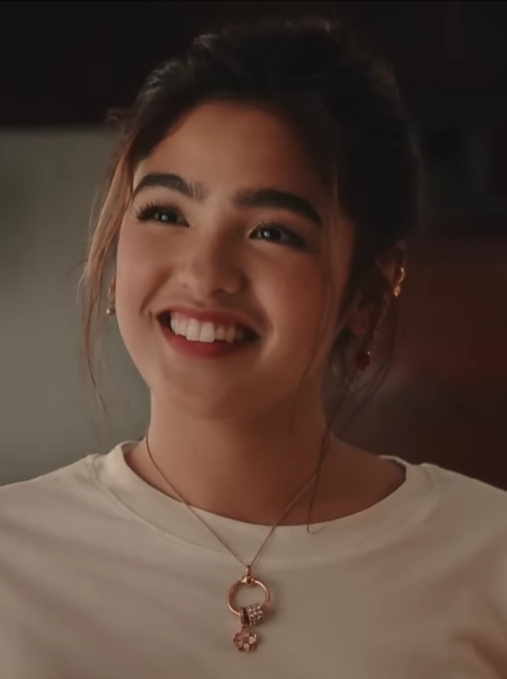
Andrea Brillantes portrays Margaret "Marga" M. Bartolome

=== Main cast ===
- Beauty Gonzalez as Romina Andrada-Mondragon
- Dimples Romana as Daniela "Dani" Mondragon-Bartolome
- Francine Diaz as Cassandra "Cassie" A. Mondragon
  - Kate Ramos as young Cassie
- Andrea Brillantes as Margaret "Marga" M. Bartolome
  - Angelika Rama as young Marga
- Albert Martinez as Roberto "Robert" Agoncillo Mondragon
- Adrian Alandy as Carlos Bartolome

=== Supporting cast ===
- Richard Yap as Leonardo "Leon" Herrera
- Kyle Echarri as Kristoff "Tope" Tejada
- Seth Fedelin as Michael "Mikoy" Sarmiento
- Susan Africa as Esther Magtira
- Ronnie Lazaro as Nicolas "Kulas" Bartolome
- Joko Diaz as Andro Domingo and Hector Mangubat
- Eric Fructuoso as Alvin Mangubat
- Aleck Bovick as Myrna Bartolome
- Sheree Bautista as Jessa Trinidad
- Arnold Reyes as Atty. Bernard Tejada
- Kim Molina as Savannah "Savi" Rosales
- Luke Conde as PO3 Jude Bartolome
- Nikko Natividad as Gino Bartolome
- Kat Galang as Bonita Marilet
- Adrian Lindayag as Neil Andrada
- Josh Ivan Morales as Jepoy Marilet
- Angelina Kanapi as Juanita "Ninang" Galvez
- Cecille Jamora Santos as Principal #1
- Danica Ontengco as Nadya Ricaforte
- CJ de Guzman as Nica de Guzman
- Bea Borres as Maureen Gatchalian
- Bea Basa as Fatima Paterno
- Julie Esguerra as Leslie Joy "LJ" Catacutan
- Criza Taa as Roxanne "Roxy" Mangubat
- Benj Manalo as Felix Dimalanta
- Alynna Velasquez as Principal Garcia

=== Guest cast and cameo appearances ===
- Eula Valdez as Rosanna Andrada
- Mickey Ferriols as Camilla Mondragon
- Eva Darren as Cecilia "Cely" Mangubat
- Valerie Concepcion as Cindy Dimaguiba
- Mel Martinez as Joaquin "Wacky" Dumagat
- Abby Bautista as Trina Martinez
- Ping Medina as Badong Sarmiento
- Brenna Garcia as Jenna Carvajal
- Glydel Mercado as Rosita Carvajal
- Nico Antonio as Ramon Evangelista
- Louise Abuel as Paco Herrera
- Ana Abad Santos as Eva Romero / Maritess
- Lou Veloso as Waldo
- Suzette Ranillo as Pilar
- Winnie Cordero as Hazel
- Avery Balasbas as Alexa
- Bea Alonzo
- Angel Locsin
- Belle Mariano
- Jhoanna Robles
- Angelo Acosta

== Broadcast ==
Kadenang Ginto premiered on October 8, 2018, on ABS-CBN. The series was the network's second longest-running afternoon drama series of the 2010s with a total of 348 episodes.

=== International broadcast ===
In December 2021, the show had its international broadcast in Ecuador as La Heredera via the free-to-air TV network Ecuavisa.

== Adaptation ==
In January 2020, an Indonesian remake of Kadenang Ginto was announced. The Verona Pictures-produced adaptation, titled Putri Mahkota (lit. 'Crown Princess'), debuted on January 5, 2020, on ANTV. It aired for 22 episodes of 110 minutes each until January 26, 2020.

== Ratings ==
Kantar Media National TV Ratings (3:50 PM PST)
Pilot Episode	Finale Episode	Peak	Average
16.2% October 8, 2018	26.2% February 7, 2020	27.1% April 23, 2019	TBD

== Accolades ==
Accolades received by Kadenang Ginto
Year	Award giving body	Category	Recipient	Results
2020	Paragala: The Central Luzon Media Awards	Best Teleserye	Kadenang Ginto	Won
2020	51st GMMSF Box-Office Entertainment Award	Most Promising Female Star for Television	Francine Diaz	Won
2020	51st GMMSF Box-Office Entertainment Award	Most Promising Male Star for Television	Kyle Echarri	Won
2020	51st GMMSF Box-Office Entertainment Award	Most Promising Loveteam for Television	Andrea Brillantes, Seth Fedelin; SethDrea	Won
2020	LionHeart TV Rawr Awards	Love Team of the Year Award	Kyle Echarri, Francine Diaz; KyCine	Won
2020	4th GEMS Hiyas ng Sining	Best Actress (TV Series "KG")	Dimples Romana	Won
2020	4th GEMS Hiyas ng Sining	Best Performance in a Supporting Role (KG)	Andrea Brillantes	Won
2020	2nd VP Choice Awards	Loveteam of the Year	Seth Fedelin, Andrea Brillantes; SethDrea	Nominated
2020	2nd VP Choice Awards	Loveteam of the Year	Kyle Echarri, Francine Diaz; KyCine	Won
2020	2nd VP Choice Awards	Promising Female Star of the Year	Francine Diaz	Won
2020	2020 Edukcircle Social Media Award	Outstanding Social Media Personality of the Year	Francine Diaz - Andrea Brillantes; Kyle Echarri - Seth Fedelin; The Gold Squad	Won
2019	2019 Asian Academy Creative Awards	Best Actress in a Supporting Role (as Daniela Mondragon in the hit afternoon drama series Kadenang Ginto)	Dimples Romana	Won
2019	Golden Laurel Media Awards	Best Daytime Drama Series	Kadenang Ginto	Won
2019	RAWR Awards 2019	Favorite Kontrabida (as Daniela Mondragon in Kadenang Ginto)	Dimples Romana	Won
2019	1st VP Choice Awards	TV series of the year	Kadenang Ginto	Won
2019	1st VP Choice Awards	TV Actress of the Year	Dimples Romana	Nominated
2019	1st VP Choice Awards	Love Team of the Year	Seth Fedelin, Andrea Brillantes; SethDrea	Nominated
2019	1st VP Choice Awards	Love Team of the Year	Kyle Echarri, Francine Diaz; KyCine	Nominated
2019	33rd PMPC Star Awards for Television	Best Daytime Drama Series	Kadenang Ginto	Won
2019	33rd PMPC Star Awards for Television	Best Drama Actress	Beauty Gonzalez	Nominated
2019	33rd PMPC Star Awards for Television	Best Drama Actress	Dimples Romana	Nominated
2019	33rd PMPC Star Awards for Television	Best New Male TV Personality	Seth Fedelin	Nominated
2019	5th Alta Media Icon Awards	Best Daytime Drama Series	Kadenang Ginto	Won
2019	5th Alta Media Icon Awards	Most Promising Male Star	Seth Fedelin	Won
2019	5th Alta Media Icon Awards	Most Promising Female Star	Francine Diaz	Won
2019	21st Gawad PASADO Awards	PinakaPASADOng Teleserye	Kadenang Ginto	Won
2019	21st Gawad PASADO Awards	PinakaPASADong Aktres	Beauty Gonzalez	Won
2019	21st Gawad PASADO Awards	PinakaPASADOng Aktor	Albert Martinez	Won
2018	Inding-indie Film Festival 2018	Gawad Puso ng Sining - Huwarang Aktres sa Telebisyon	Francine Diaz	Won
