= Andrea Brillantes =

Filipino actress (born 2003)

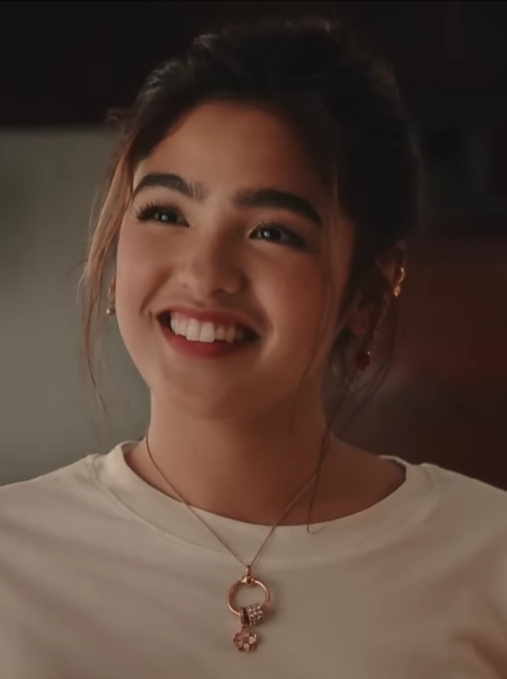
- Brillantes in the music video of "Tahanan" in 2022
- Born: Ramona Blythe Daguio Gorostiza; March 12, 2003 (age 23); Taytay, Rizal, Philippines
- Occupation: Actress
- Years active: 2010–present
- Agents: Star Magic (2010–2025); MQuest Ventures (2025–present)
- Works: Annaliza; Kadenang Ginto

Ramona Blythe Daguio Gorostiza (born March 12, 2003), known professionally as Andrea Brillantes (Tagalog pronunciation: [bɾilˈjɐntɛs]), is a Filipino actress. She began her career as a child actress, debuting in the sketch comedy show, Goin' Bulilit (2010–2013). Her breakthrough came when she starred as the title character of the television series, Annaliza (2013–2014), and later became known for her portrayal of Marga in the melodrama, Kadenang Ginto (2018–2020). Her accolades include two PMPC Star Awards for Television and a Box Office Entertainment Award.

== Career ==
=== Early roles and breakthrough (2010–2017) ===
At age 7, Brillantes began appearing in a number of television commercials and made her debut in the children's comedy show, Goin’ Bulilit’ in 2010. The same year, she played a supporting role in the series Precious Hearts Romances Presents Alyna. In 2012, she began appearing in more television series as young version of the lead actresses in Budoy as young Jackie played by Jessie Mendiola, Kahit Puso’y Masugatan as young Veronica played by Andi Eigenmann and in Ina, Kapatid, Anak as young Celyn played by Kim Chiu. She received praises for her role as Princess in the fantasy series E-Boy and played minor or supporting roles in the anthologies Wansapanataym and Maalaala Mo Kaya. Brillantes made her one-time appearance on GMA Network at Cielo de Angelina as Bernadeth Nantes.

In 2013, Brillantes was cast in two programs Bukas Na Lang Kita Mamahalin and Pidol's Wonderland. After playing supporting and minor roles since her acting debut, she starred in her first lead role, Annaliza (a remake of the same name originally played by Julie Vega). The series reigned over its timeslot and received its highest national TV rating of 27.8% on February 12, 2014. Her performance earned her an accolade for Best Child Performer at the 27th PMPC Star Awards for Television. The following year, she landed another role in the family drama series Hawak Kamay. Her portrayal as Lorrie earned her another accolade at the Yahoo! Celebrity Award for Child Star of the Year.

Brillantes ventured more dramatic roles and played supporting roles in Pangako Sa 'Yo as Lia Buenavista and in Ikaw Lang ang Iibigin as Stephanie Reyes. She became an occasional performer in the musical variety show ASAP and was cast in two more television programs in 2017, A Love to Last and another episode of Wansapanataym opposite Grae Fernandez.

=== Further film and television appearances (2018–present) ===
Brillantes worked on three television projects in 2018. She was cast in a minor role as Young Matadora played by Aiko Melendez in Bagani and starred in an episode of the weekly drama anthology Ipaglaban Mo!. In October 2018, she was cast to play one of the lead characters of her biggest role to date, Marga Mondragon Bartolome, in the afternoon drama soap Kadenang Ginto. Along with newcomer Francine Diaz, Dimples Romana, and Beauty Gonzalez, it reigned over the rival shows and received its highest national TV rating of 27.1% on April 23, 2019. The series also helped propel Brillantes to new heights of popularity, increasing her presence on social media. Her portrayal earned her a number of accolades such as Most Promising Loveteam for Television with Seth Fedelin at the Box Office Entertainment Awards, Best Performance in a Supporting Role at the GEMS Hiyas ng Sining Awards and Outstanding Social Media Personality of the Year at the EdukCircle Awards.

The same year, Brillantes also appeared in a supporting role in the comedy film Ang Dalawang Mrs. Reyes and starred in the film Kahit Ayaw Mo Na alongside Empress Schuck and Kristel Fulgar. The film received underwhelming numbers at the Philippine box office, grossing less than ₱300,000 on its opening day. In 2019, she became more visible in films. She starred in an iWantTFC Originals produced movie Spark opposite Grae Fernandez. In May 2019, she starred with Miguel Tanfelix, Bianca Umali, Taki and Kim Last in the horror film Banal. While the film received average reviews from critics, the film underperformed at the box-office. In August 2019, she starred in another horror film The Ghosting with Khalil Ramos. Despite the decent critical reviews, the film still received underwhelming numbers.

In November 2019, Brillantes starred opposite Seth Fedelin in the romantic comedy film Wild Little Love. First premiered on the streaming platform iWantTFC, the film also made its debut on television in 2020 and on the streaming giant Netflix in 2021. In December 2019, she appeared in a minor role as young Morissette Molina played by Anne Curtis in the blockbuster comedy film The Mall, The Merrier. In March 2021, she starred with the Gold Squad in the drama series Huwag Kang Mangamba. In June 2021, her episode in the anthology series Click, Like, Share: Poser premiered on iWantTFC service. In September 2021, Brillantes played a supporting role in the Erik Matti film On the Job: The Missing 8 which was premiered at the 78th Venice International Film Festival. Later in 2021, she reunited with Seth Fedelin in the weekly series Saying Goodbye which premiered on the Chinese streaming service iQiyi.

The following year, Brillantes starred in two iWantTFC produced series, Lyric and Beat and Drag You & Me. Both shows received overwhelming reception from the audience. In August 2023, she made her television comeback in the teen drama Senior High where she plays both roles of twin characters Sky and Luna Cruz. Following the success of Senior High, she reprised her role in a 2024 TV series sequel, High Street.

== Acting style and reception ==
Brillantes is lauded for her dramatic performances in film and television programs. Writing for ABS-CBN Entertainment, Liezel dela Cruz praised her for pushing "herself further into new acting territories" in the series Senior High, saying: "she doubles her talent and grit as she takes on dual duty playing twin characters Sky and Luna." Filipino actress Angel Aquino also praised her acting prowess saying: "I've seen her works and I know how good she is."

Commercially, Brillantes is regarded as one of the most bankable actresses of her generation. She is the most followed Filipino celebrity on TikTok. According to the online financial service provider NetCredit, she is fifth biggest earner on Instagram based on sponsored posts in 2021 with ₱75 million ($1,281,692). She has been chosen as the brand ambassador of renowned brands such as H&M, Infinix Mobile and Beautéderm. At age 19, she became the youngest celebrity CEO in the Philippines, launching her own make-up empire, Lucky Beauty. She made her runway debut in Michael Leyva's bridal couture show at the Hilton Manila.

== Personal life ==
Brillantes dated past on-screen partner Seth Fedelin from 2019 to October 2021. She met Fedelin while filming Kadenang Ginto. She also dated Ricci Rivero from April 2022 to May 2023. They became a couple when Rivero did a public proposal after his basketball game.

== Filmography ==
=== Film ===
Year	Title	Role
2010	Father Jejemon	N/A
2013	Momzillas	Young Rina
2015	Crazy Beautiful You	Nene
2015	Everyday I Love You	Young Audrey
2018	Ang Dalawang Mrs. Reyes	Macey Reyes
2018	Kahit Ayaw Mo Na	Ally
2019	Spark	Beth
2019	Banal	Rithea "Thea" Del Rosario
2019	The Ghosting	Grace
2019	Wild Little Love	Sam
2019	The Mall, The Merrier	teenage Morissette "Setset" Molina
2021	On the Job: The Missing 8	Diane
2025	Rekonek	Gigi

=== Television/Digital ===
Year	Title	Role	Ref.
2010	Precious Hearts Romances Presents: Alyna	Sofia Alvaro (credited as Blythe Gorostiza)	
2010–2013	Goin' Bulilit	Herself	
2011	Maalaala Mo Kaya: Stroller	Angel	
2011	Budoy	Young Jackie	
2012	Kahit Puso'y Masugatan	Young Veronica	
2012	Ina, Kapatid, Anak	Young Celyn	
2012	Pidol's Wonderland: Ang Pizza ni Fritzie	Maddie	
2012	Wansapanataym: Da Revengers	Isay	
2012	Wansapanataym: Doll House	Emily	
2012	Nandito Ako	Young Anya	
2012	E-Boy	Princess	
2012–2013	Cielo de Angelina	Bernadeth Nantes	
2013	Bukas Na Lang Kita Mamahalin	Young Amanda	
2013	Maalaala Mo Kaya: Marriage Contract	Young Enez	
2013	Maalaala Mo Kaya: Bimpo	Young April	
2013	Istorifik: Kwentong Pidol's Fanstastik	Emily	
2013–2014	Annaliza	Annaliza Querubin / Julie Benedicto	
2013–2025	ASAP	Herself	
2014	Wanspanataym: My Guardian Angel	Ylia Clemente Jimenez	
2014	Hawak Kamay	Lorraine "Lorry" Magpantay-Agustin	
2015–2016	Pangako Sa 'Yo	Lia Buenavista	
2017–2018	Ikaw Lang ang Iibigin	Stephanie "Steph" Reyes	
2017	A Love to Last	Young Andrea	
2017	Wansapanataym: Louie's Biton	Tori	
2017	Maalaala Mo Kaya: Siopao	Waway	
2018	Bagani	Young Matadora	
2018	Ipaglaban Mo: Dakip	Emily Angeles	
2018–2020	Kadenang Ginto	Margaret "Marga" Mondragon-Bartolome	
2020	Paano Kita Mapasasalamatan?	young Iza Calzado	
2021	Click, Like, Share: Poser	Beth/Lily	
2021	Huwag Kang Mangamba	Mira Cruz / Mira Santisimo	
2021	Saying Goodbye	Elise	
2022	Lyric and Beat	Lyric	
2022	Maalaala Mo Kaya: Engagement Ring	Victoria	
2022	Drag You & Me	Betty	
2023–2024	Senior High	Luna Amore Cruz / Sky Love Cruz	
2024	High Street	Sky Love Cruz	
2025	FPJ's Batang Quiapo	Fatima Benito	
2026	A Secret in Prague	Kiara	

== Awards and nominations ==
Awards and nominations received by Andrea Brillantes
Award (Note: Awards, festivals, honors and other miscellaneous organizations are listed in alphabetical order.)	Year (Note: Indicates the year of ceremony. Each year is linked to the article about the awards held that year, wherever possible.)	Category	Nominated work	Result	Ref.
Anak TV Awards	2023	Net Makabata Star	Herself	Won	
ASAP Pop Viewers' Choice Awards	2014	Pop Teen Popsies	Hawak Kamay	Nominated	
Box Office Entertainment Awards	2020	Most Promising Loveteam (with Seth Fedelin)	Herself	Won	
Edukcircle Awards	2020	Outstanding Social Media Personality of the Year (with Francine Diaz, Seth Fedelin & Kyle Echarri)	—N/a	Won	
GEMS Hiyas ng Sining Awards	2020	Best Performance in a Supporting Role	Kadenang Ginto	Won	
Platinum Stallion Media Awards	2021	Best Drama Actress	Huwag Kang Mangamba	Won	
PMPC Star Awards for Television	2013	Best Child Performer	Annaliza	Won	
PMPC Star Awards for Television	2014	Best Child Performer	Annaliza	Nominated	
PMPC Star Awards for Television	2021	German Moreno Power Tandem of the Year (with Seth Fedelin)	Herself	Won	
PUSH Awards	2021	Popular Loveteam (with Seth Fedelin)	Herself	Nominated	
PUSH Awards	2021	Trending TikToker	Herself	Nominated	
PUSH Awards	2022	Popular Loveteam of the Year (with Seth Fedelin)	Huwag Kang Mangamba	Nominated	
PUSH Awards	2022	Favorite On-screen Performance	Huwag Kang Mangamba	Nominated	
PUSH Awards	2022	Trending TikToker of the Year	Herself	Nominated	
Tag Awards Chicago	2022	Best Supporting Actress	Huwag Kang Mangamba	Won	
TikTok Philippines Awards	2021	Top Celebrity	Herself	Won	
Urduja Heritage Film Awards	2020	Best Young Actress	Banal	Won	
Yahoo! Celebrity Awards	2014	Child Star of the Year	Hawak Kamay	Won	

== See also ==
- List of Filipino actresses
- Cinema of the Philippines
- Television in the Philippines
