= Roja (Philippine TV series) =

Philippine action drama television series

- Promotional poster
- Genre: Action; Drama
- Written by: Genesis Rodriguez; Nathan Arciaga; Tyron Santos; Allan Cuadra
- Directed by: Lawrence L. Fajardo; Andoy L. Ranay; Raymund B. Ocampo; Rico Navarro
- Starring: Donny Pangilinan; Kyle Echarri; Maymay Entrata; Janice de Belen; Joel Torre; Raymond Bagatsing; Lorna Tolentino
- Music by: Idonnah C. Villarico; Rommel C. Villarico
- Opening theme: "Roja" by Maymay Entrata & LPR
- Country of origin: Philippines
- Original language: Filipino
- No. of episodes: 80

Production
- Executive producers: Carlo L. Katigbak; Cory V. Vidanes; Laurenti M. Dyogi; Kylie Manalo-Balagtas; Rondel P. Lindayag
- Producer: Rosselle Soldao-Gannaban
- Production locations: Cagraray, Albay
- Cinematography: Albert Banzon; Mac Cosico
- Editors: Rommel Maliman; Aries Pascual; Christine Ang; Godwin Lucena; Hanie Uy
- Running time: 20–36 minutes
- Production companies: ABS-CBN Studios; Dreamscape Entertainment

Original release
- Network: Kapamilya Channel (Note: First released on Netflix and iWant that marketed as "advanced screening". It is currently airing on its primary network Kapamilya Channel as well as other blocktime channels and platforms.)
- Release: November 24, 2025 – March 13, 2026

Roja (Spanish word for Red) is a Philippine action drama television series produced by Dreamscape Entertainment. Directed by Lawrence Fajardo, Andoy Ranay, Raymund Ocampo, and Rico Navarro, it stars Donny Pangilinan and Kyle Echarri. The series premiered on November 24, 2025, on the Kapamilya Channel's Primetime Bida evening block. It was concluded on March 13, 2026, with the total of 80 episodes.

== Premise ==
Set in the resort of La Playa Roja, Liam (Donny Pangilinan), the head chef, and Olsen (Kyle Echarri), the security guard, have a long-standing friendship. Their friendship fell apart as Liam discovered his father's affair with another woman. One night, an armed group took hostages and controlled all across the resort. Liam and Olsen are forced to confront their misunderstanding and join forces in combat to save themselves and their families.

== Cast and characters ==
=== Main cast ===
- Donny Pangilinan as Liam Roja: The head chef of La Playa Roja who had a rift against Magnus and Olsen because they hide his father's affair to Ayen.
- Kyle Echarri as Olsen Bonifacio: One of the security guards of La Playa Roja, who had a rift with Liam, due to their misunderstandings and was the one who knew Magnus' affair with Ayen but kept it secretly away from Liam, resulting to their feud.
- Maymay Entrata as Luna Javier: Liam and Olsen's friend and the sous chef of La Playa Roja. She is also the love interest of Ivan.
- Janice de Belen as Rowena "Wendy" Bonifacio: Olsen's mother and Greta's friend. She was jailed to protect Greta from imprisonment because of her crimes and in return the latter will pay Olsen's medical bills.
- Joel Torre as Emil "Uno" Padua: The leader of an armed group, who had a dispute between him and Magnus six years ago, and decided to take over the entire resort. He has a huge grudge towards the Roja Family for his and Ayen's misfortunes.
- Raymond Bagatsing as Magnus Roja: The co-owner of La Playa Roja, Liam's father, and Greta's husband. His secret affair with Ayen drives the series of misfortunes in La Playa Roja and his rift with his son Liam.
- Lorna Tolentino as Greta Roja: The co-owner of La Playa Roja, Liam's mother, and Magnus' wife. She was the mastermind of La Playa Roja kidnapping incident to regain the money she lost because of gambling addiction through P/Capt. Jericho Jacinto. She was also responsible for killing Ayen when she defended herself against Ayen. She was killed by Emil for avenging his daughter.

=== Recurring cast ===
- Cris Villanueva as Engr. Michael "Mike" del Rosario: Minnie's husband and Maddie's father.
- Nikki Valdez as Arch. Minerva "Minnie" del Rosario: Mike's wife and Maddie's mother who is suffering from an illness.
- Zia Grace Bataan as Maddie del Rosario: only child of Mike & Minnie.
- Sandy Andolong as Concepcion "Coney" Alegre-Murillo: Jessie's wife. She later discover that her husband and his nurse have an secret affair that ruin their marriage.
- Robert Seña as Dr. Jessie Murillo: Coney's husband. He has an secret affair with his nurse, Claire but he is determined to fix their marriage to rebuild it for their son.
- Levi Ignacio as Chief Ruben "Ben" Bonifacio: Wendy's father, Olsen's grandfather and coach. Also the Head security of La Playa Roja. He died after taking the bullet meant for his grandson.
- Rubi Rubi as Happy Capinpin: employee of La Playa Roja.
- Inka Magnaye as Love Balastigue: employee of La Playa Roja.
- Vangie Castillo as Grace Magno: employee of La Playa Roja.
- Sophie Reyes as Joy Beltran: employee of La Playa Roja.
- Rikki Mae Davao as Smile Dueñas/Leni Padua: employee of La Playa Roja. Later revealed that she is also the daughter of Emil and younger sister of Ayen. She was accidentally killed by her own father, Emil.
- Rans Rifol as Nurse Claire Alegre: Dr. Jessie's nurse assistant, she is also the latter's mistress.
- Kobie Brown as Mark Anthony "Macky" Maristela: one of La Playa Roja's VIP guests, who is a son of a senator.
- Maika Rivera as Rita Prudencio: one of La Playa Roja's VIP guests.
- Benedict Cua as Christopher "Boss Topak" Casares: one of La Playa Roja's VIP guests.
- Iñigo Jose as John Obadiah "Jabbas" Cheng: one of La Playa Roja's VIP guests. He was killed by Emil after he failed to seek help from his father to obtain a loan and for his ensearing remarks against Emil's group.
- Marc Abaya as Lucas "Dos" Sebastian/Bishop Anthony: Former Special Force and member of Emil's armed group. He pretends as one of La Playa Roja's VIP guests (as a bishop) and reports everything to Emil to make him and their group enter to La Playa Roja easily. He was killed by PLt. Areza after he tried to save Emil.
- Bernard Palanca as Diosdado "Dado/Tres" Menor: member of Emil's armed group and elder brother of Ian. He is expert in arms and explosives.
- Harvey Bautista as Ian "Kwatro" Menor: member of Emil's armed group and younger brother of Dado. He is expert in computers and cyberhacking. He was accidentally killed by his own brother, Dado.
- Gello Marquez as Bobong "Cinco" Aguas: member of Emil's armed group. He acts as the group's sniper. He was killed by Olsen.
- Lou Yanong as Gwen "Sais" Zaragosa: member of Emil's armed group. Has excellent fighting skills, but killed by Olsen.
- Kai Montinola as Isabella "Ice" Mercado: one of La Playa Roja's VIP guests. A nursing student who admires Olsen. She managed to save Wendy's life.
- AC Bonifacio as Juliana "Jules" Santos: one of La Playa Roja VIP guests who is a vlogger. She and Mama Ona were killed by Lucas.
- Emilio Daez as Benedict "Bogs" Lim: one of La Playa Roja's VIP guests.
- Xilhouete as Rolando "Mama Ona" Chan: one of La Playa Roja's VIP guests. He and Jules were killed by Lucas.
- Floyd Tena as P/Capt. Jericho Jacinto: the policemen who act as eye and ear of Emil in police station. He instructed Emil to kidnap the guests and employees of La Playa Roja for money in exchange of their freedom. He was also Greta's boss who was instructed to instigate the hostage incident in La Playa Roja in exchange for settling Greta's debts.
- Raven Molina as Police Officer Cariaso: the assistant of Areza who leads the rescue operations for victims in La Playa Roja kidnapping incident.
- Igi Boy Flores as Fin Muñoz: one of security guards of La Playa Roja. Olsen's friend.

=== Special participation ===
- Yassi Pressman as Ayen Padua: Magnus' mistress, her affair with Magnus is the reason why Liam and Olsen's friendship was ruined badly. She is the daughter of Emil and the sister of Leni. She and her future child were murdered by Greta after latter discovered her pregnancy to Magnus and then, they were buried by latter.
- Ejay Falcon as PLt. Marlon Areza: the one who lead the rescue operations for La Playa Roja kidnapping victims, he was killed by Emil's men after saving the latter.

=== Guest cast ===
- Enzo Pineda as Marco Murillo: son of Jessie and Coney
- Michelle Vito as Kianna Murillo: wife of Marco and daughter in law of Jessie and Coney.
- Bart Guingona as P/Maj. Domingo: The head of operations in the precinct to save the hostages in La Playa Roja. He was killed by Lucas.
- Christian Vasquez as Homer Sebastian: brother of Lucas and brother-in-law of Mila. He is also part of Emil's group. He is also the allegedly father of Olsen.
- Iana Bernardez as Mila Sebastian: Lucas' wife. She is also part of Emil's group. She wants Lucas to quit the group to start a new life since she is now pregnant for their first child.
- Lloyd Samartino as Sen. Eduardo Maristella: father of Macky who is a senator.
- Jeremiah Lisbo as Dr. Ivan Ledesma: the doctor of a hospital where the rescued victims from La Playa Roja brought. He became an ally to Luna, Liam and Olsen after the hospital was became the target of Emil's group. He is also the love interest of Luna.
- Joel Molina as P/Maj. Gen. Cabral: the one who lead the rescue operations when the hospital was became the next target of Emil's group.
- Paolo Serrano as Fredo: member of Emil's group.
- Mark Manicad as Roman: member of Emil's group.

== Episodes ==
No.	Title	TV title	Directed by	Original release date
1	"Welcome to La Playa Roja"	"Welcome to La Playa Roja"	Lawrence Fajardo, Andoy Ranay, and Raymund Ocampo	November 24, 2025
Set in the resort of La Playa Roja, all the chefs, staff, security, and managers are prepping for many special visitors. However, Liam, the head chef, has been planning on leaving the resort because of the rift between him and his father, Magnus, & his former close friend and a security guard, Olsen. Six years ago, while Liam was leaving for school, his father had an affair with another woman, Ayen. After Liam's mother, Greta, was angered by what Magnus did, he wrongfully blamed Liam for the family dispute. Afterwards, their friendship between Olsen and Liam had slowly fallen apart due to their misunderstandings. On the present day, wealthy families, influencers, and other guests had arrived at the resort. Unbeknownst to all the guests and security guards, Dos, one of its members of an armed group led by Uno, has gone undercover as a pastor. He was wandering across the resort, awaiting a planned surprise takeover of the resort at night.
2	"True Intentions"	"First Blood"	Lawrence Fajardo, Andoy Ranay, and Raymund Ocampo	November 25, 2025
An esteemed guest draws scrutiny from an employee. Liam reveals his school plans to his disapproving father, while Olsen gets a new assignment.
3	"The Guest is Always Right"	"The Guests"	Lawrence Fajardo, Andoy Ranay, and Raymund Ocampo	November 26, 2025
Luna tries to broker a truce between Olsen and Liam as he prepares to leave for New York. Guests are bewildered when Wi-Fi and phone signals go down.
4	"The Siege"	"Hostage"	Lawrence Fajardo, Andoy Ranay, and Raymund Ocampo	November 27, 2025
A shocking turn of events sends the resort into a panic as a masked group of assassins confront the guests - and call them by name.
5	"Unlikely Tandem"	"Survival Begins"	Lawrence Fajardo, Andoy Ranay, and Raymund Ocampo	November 28, 2025
Tensions continue to rise at the resort as the situation worsens. After a difficult confrontation, Liam and Olsen agree to put the past behind them.
6	"Money Makes the World Go Round"	"First Kill"	Lawrence Fajardo, Andoy Ranay, and Raymund Ocampo	December 1, 2025
On the beach, Liam and Olsen intercept Uno's team and rescue someone dear to both of them. A group of influencers discuss their escape plan.
7	"A Kink in the Plans"	"Ransom"	Lawrence Fajardo, Andoy Ranay, and Raymund Ocampo	December 2, 2025
Liam's worried parents speculate about his whereabouts. Uno's team forces a couple staying at the resort to call a relative for help.
8	"SOS"	"Bravery"	Lawrence Fajardo, Andoy Ranay, and Raymund Ocampo	December 3, 2025
Ben and Wendy suspect the operation may be an inside job. Luna guides a father and daughter safely across the resort after a heartbreaking incident.
9	"Sins from the Past"	"Imagination"	Lawrence Fajardo, Andoy Ranay, and Raymund Ocampo	December 4, 2025
A call from local authorities offers hope to the captives. From a hidden spot, Luna, Liam and Olsen keep an eye on Uno's brutality in the dining room.
10	"Betrayals"	"Surrender"	Lawrence Fajardo, Andoy Ranay, and Raymund Ocampo	December 5, 2025
When Liam won't talk, Uno threatens to use his parents as leverage. Meanwhile, Wendy reflects on a painful choice she made years ago.
11	"A Dangerous Ruse"	"Pretend"	Lawrence Fajardo, Andoy Ranay, and Raymund Ocampo	December 8, 2025
Uno and his crew try to deceive law enforcement officials when they arrive to investigate the call from Liam - who has another backup plan.
12	"Bloody Steak"	"SOS"	Lawrence Fajardo, Andoy Ranay, and Raymund Ocampo	December 9, 2025
Olsen searches for Dr. Morillo to tend to his injured mother, while authorities continue to scour the island and question the nervous guests.
13	"An Invitation to a Party"	"Celebration"	Lawrence Fajardo, Andoy Ranay, and Rico Navarro	December 10, 2025
A jubilant Uno forces the captives to celebrate a win, while Olsen tackles a key member of the gang. Liam faces punishment from Gwen.
14	"Hidden Intentions"	"Sniper Down"	Lawrence Fajardo, Andoy Ranay, and Rico Navarro	December 11, 2025
Mangus and Liam share a rare heartfelt moment after reuniting. As tensions remain high at the resort, Uno begins to expose the truth behind his actions.
15	"A Deadly Mission"	"Bomb"	Lawrence Fajardo, Andoy Ranay, and Rico Navarro	December 12, 2025
Dado and his team send Liam on a dangerous mission to ensure Luna's safety. Rolando makes a desperate attempt to escape Lucas' clutches.
16	"Mission Fallout"	"Revealed"	Lawrence Fajardo, Andoy Ranay, and Rico Navarro	December 15, 2025
When Magnus tries to raise cash, Greta is force to reveal her secret. Dado and his gang gleefully watch on as the clock ticks down on Liam's fate.
17	"The Disguise"	"Enemy"	Lawrence Fajardo, Andoy Ranay, and Rico Navarro	December 16, 2025
After an officer dismisses his concerns, Marco Decides to head to La Playa Roja. Olsen ventures out in the aftermath and runs into a familiar face.
18	"Hostage of Secrets"	"Escape"	Lawrence Fajardo, Andoy Ranay, and Rico Navarro	December 17, 2025
The police return to the island for a classified high-stakes operation, while Greta's confession ignites conflict between Liam and Olsen.
19	"Cornered"	"Rescued"	Lawrence Fajardo, Andoy Ranay, and Rico Navarro	December 18, 2025
Greta and Magnus run into the gunmen, who are under orders to kill everyone on sight. A hostage overhears Dado outlining his heinous next move.
20	"Breaking Point"	"Unite"	Lawrence Fajardo, Andoy Ranay, and Rico Navarro	December 19, 2025
Olsen and Liam battle Uno's men, while Ben and Fin find help as the stumble upon Lt. Areza's team. Greta's mistake catches up with her.
21	"Blueprints of Betrayal"	"Encounter"	Lawrence Fajardo, Andoy Ranay, and Rico Navarro	December 22, 2025
22	"Bloody Scheme"	"Sacrifice"	Lawrence Fajardo, Andoy Ranay, and Rico Navarro	December 23, 2025
23	"Escape Under Fire"	"Disguise"	Lawrence Fajardo, Andoy Ranay, and Rico Navarro	December 24, 2025
24	"The Mole Among Us"	"Accomplice"	Lawrence Fajardo, Andoy Ranay, and Rico Navarro	December 25, 2025
25	"Countdown to Zero"	"Banquet"	Lawrence Fajardo, Andoy Ranay, and Rico Navarro	December 26, 2025
26	"Aftermath"	"Survived"	Lawrence Fajardo, Andoy Ranay, and Rico Navarro	December 29, 2025
27	"Double-Cross"	"Traitor"	Lawrence Fajardo, Andoy Ranay, and Rico Navarro	December 30, 2025
28	"The Sketch"	"Frame Up"	Lawrence Fajardo, Andoy Ranay, and Rico Navarro	December 31, 2025
29	"Island Threats"	"Double Kill"	Lawrence Fajardo, Andoy Ranay, and Rico Navarro	January 1, 2026
30	"Hostage for a Hostage"	"Trick"	Lawrence Fajardo, Andoy Ranay, and Rico Navarro	January 2, 2026
31	"Daughter Revealed"	"Wounded"	Lawrence Fajardo, Andoy Ranay, and Rico Navarro	January 5, 2026
32	"Island in Peril"	"Torture"	Lawrence Fajardo, Andoy Ranay, and Rico Navarro	January 6, 2026
33	"Ransom and Terror"	"100 Million"	Lawrence Fajardo, Andoy Ranay, and Rico Navarro	January 7, 2026
34	"Clash and Redemption"	"Mistakes"	Lawrence Fajardo, Andoy Ranay, and Rico Navarro	January 8, 2026
35	"Conspiracy"	"Demand"	Lawrence Fajardo, Andoy Ranay, and Rico Navarro	January 9, 2026
36	"Safe Passage"	"Accident"	Lawrence Fajardo, Andoy Ranay, and Rico Navarro	January 12, 2026
37	"Deadly Showdown"	"Hiding Place"	Lawrence Fajardo, Andoy Ranay, and Rico Navarro	January 13, 2026
38	"Dark Ties"	"Decoy"	Lawrence Fajardo, Andoy Ranay, and Rico Navarro	January 14, 2026
39	"Mastermind Revealed"	"Plan B"	Lawrence Fajardo, Andoy Ranay, and Rico Navarro	January 15, 2026
40	"Vanished"	"Casualties"	Lawrence Fajardo, Andoy Ranay, and Rico Navarro	January 16, 2026
41	"Family Matters"	"Family Picture"	Lawrence Fajardo, Andoy Ranay, and Rico Navarro	January 19, 2026
42	"Talk with the Devil"	"Chase"	Lawrence Fajardo, Andoy Ranay, and Rico Navarro	January 20, 2026
43	"Casualties"	"Decoy"	Lawrence Fajardo, Andoy Ranay, and Rico Navarro	January 21, 2026
44	"Hanging by a Thread"	"Revelation"	Lawrence Fajardo, Andoy Ranay, and Rico Navarro	January 22, 2026
45	"Connected by Blood"	"Critical"	Lawrence Fajardo, Andoy Ranay, and Rico Navarro	January 23, 2026
46	"Loss"	"Chief Lo"	Lawrence Fajardo, Andoy Ranay, and Rico Navarro	January 26, 2026
47	"Ben"	"Suspicion"	Lawrence Fajardo, Andoy Ranay, and Rico Navarro	January 27, 2026
48	"The Truth in Our Veins"	"New Plan"	Lawrence Fajardo, Andoy Ranay, and Rico Navarro	January 28, 2026
49	"The Breakout"	"Fire Alarm"	Lawrence Fajardo, Andoy Ranay, and Rico Navarro	January 29, 2026
50	"Code Red"	"Siege"	Lawrence Fajardo, Andoy Ranay, and Rico Navarro	January 30, 2026
51	"Hell Above"	"Siege Again"	Lawrence Fajardo, Andoy Ranay, and Rico Navarro	February 2, 2026
52	"No Way In, No Way Out"	"Captive"	Lawrence Fajardo, Andoy Ranay, and Rico Navarro	February 3, 2026
53	"Pay the Price"	"Tipping Point"	Lawrence Fajardo, Andoy Ranay, and Rico Navarro	February 4, 2026
54	"Two Sons"	"Real Son"	Lawrence Fajardo, Andoy Ranay, and Rico Navarro	February 5, 2026
55	"The Retrieval"	"Search"	Lawrence Fajardo, Andoy Ranay, and Rico Navarro	February 6, 2026
56	"Ashes"	"Hidden Agenda"	Lawrence Fajardo, Andoy Ranay, and Rico Navarro	February 9, 2026
57	"Blue Fish"	"Escape Route"	Lawrence Fajardo, Andoy Ranay, and Rico Navarro	February 10, 2026
58	"Old Flames"	"Connection"	Lawrence Fajardo, Andoy Ranay, and Rico Navarro	February 11, 2026
59	"Dancing with Danger"	"Weapons"	Lawrence Fajardo, Andoy Ranay, and Rico Navarro	February 12, 2026
60	"Secret Ingredient"	"Real Father"	Lawrence Fajardo, Andoy Ranay, and Rico Navarro	February 13, 2026
61	"Knocked Out"	"Fist Fight"	Lawrence Fajardo, Andoy Ranay, and Rico Navarro	February 16, 2026
62	"It's All in the Hands"	"Disarmed Bomb"	Lawrence Fajardo, Andoy Ranay, and Rico Navarro	February 17, 2026
63	"Pierce the Veil"	"Last Chance"	Lawrence Fajardo, Andoy Ranay, and Rico Navarro	February 18, 2026
64	"Shots Fired"	"Mastermind Revealed"	Lawrence Fajardo, Andoy Ranay, and Rico Navarro	February 19, 2026
65	"The Mastermind"	"Shocking Truth"	Lawrence Fajardo, Andoy Ranay, and Rico Navarro	February 20, 2026
66	"Confession"	"Undeniable Proof"	Lawrence Fajardo, Andoy Ranay, and Rico Navarro	February 23, 2026
67	"Explosion"	"Deadly Decision"	Lawrence Fajardo, Andoy Ranay, and Rico Navarro	February 24, 2026
68	"Inferno"	"Still Alive"	Lawrence Fajardo, Andoy Ranay, and Rico Navarro	February 25, 2026
69	"Under the Law"	"Finding Greta"	Lawrence Fajardo, Andoy Ranay, and Rico Navarro	February 26, 2026
70	"A Moment of Stillness"	"Zero Involvement"	Lawrence Fajardo, Andoy Ranay, and Rico Navarro	February 27, 2026
71	"Hidden Clues"	"No More Hiding"	Lawrence Fajardo, Andoy Ranay, and Rico Navarro	March 2, 2026
72	"Buried Anger"	"Fake Coma"	Lawrence Fajardo, Andoy Ranay, and Rico Navarro	March 3, 2026
73	"Broken Bonds"	"One Request"	Lawrence Fajardo, Andoy Ranay, and Rico Navarro	March 4, 2026
74	"Final Moments"	"Last Meal"	Lawrence Fajardo, Andoy Ranay, and Rico Navarro	March 5, 2026
75	"Last Mission"	"Target Located"	Lawrence Fajardo, Andoy Ranay, and Rico Navarro	March 6, 2026
76	"Shocking Arrival"	"Hurting Liam"	Lawrence Fajardo, Andoy Ranay, and Rico Navarro	March 9, 2026
77	"Secrets and Plans"	"Ayen Is Dead"	Lawrence Fajardo, Andoy Ranay, and Rico Navarro	March 10, 2026
78	"Clash of Fathers"	"Greta"	Lawrence Fajardo, Andoy Ranay, and Rico Navarro	March 11, 2026
79	"Farewells and New Beginnings"	"Final Battle"	Lawrence Fajardo, Andoy Ranay, and Rico Navarro	March 12, 2026
80	"Final Crossroads"	"New Beginnings"	Lawrence Fajardo, Andoy Ranay, and Rico Navarro	March 13, 2026

== Production ==
=== Development ===
This series was announced on August 15, 2025. On September 1, 2025, Law Fajardo and Raymund Ocampo will serve as directors of this series. Additionally, Andoy Ranay and Rico Navarro will join alongside other directors.

=== Casting ===
Donny Pangilinan and Kyle Echarri were announced as lead roles for this series. Joining the cast alongside are Maymay Entrata, Raymond Bagatsing, Joel Torre, Janice de Belen, and Lorna Tolentino. Additionally, Nikki Valdez, Cris Villanueva, Zia Grace, Freddie Webb, Sandy Andolong, Robert Seña, Levi Ignacio, Rubi Rubi, Inka Magnaye, Vangie Castillo, Sophie Reyes, Rikki Mae Davao, Rans Rifol, Maika Rivera, Lou Yanong, Marc Abaya, Bernard Palanca, Floyd Tena, Raven Molina, Gello Marquez, Iñigo Jose, Harvey Bautista, Kai Montinola, AC Bonifacio, and Emilio Daez are announced as part of the cast on September 1, 2025.

=== Filming ===
Principal photography began in September 2025 at Misibis Bay Resort in Cagraray, Albay, which serves as the main location.

=== Marketing ===
A teaser trailer for the series has been released on September 25, 2025. A full trailer was released on October 4, 2025. Donny Pangilinan, Kyle Echarri, and Yassi Pressman promoted this series on ASAP on October 5, 2025. A red carpet premiere was held at Trinoma on November 9, 2025.

== Release ==
The series was originally going to release on October 17, 18, and 20, 2025, respectively. However, it was moved to November 21, 2025, on Netflix, and iWant the following day, due to production delay. It also premiered on Kapamilya Channel, Kapamilya Online Live, and other television channels & platforms on November 24, 2025. The series consists of 80 episodes, and it concluded on March 13, 2026.
