= Blood vs Duty =

Philippine action drama television series

- Promotional poster
- Genre: Action; Drama; Crime; Soap opera
- Written by: Dindo C. Perez; Cenon Obispo Palomares; Jann Mendoza; Shania Vozel Obenia
- Directed by: FM Reyes; Bjoy Balagtas; Rico Navarro
- Starring: Richard Gutierrez; Gerald Anderson; Bela Padilla; Barbie Imperial; Baron Geisler
- Country of origin: Philippines
- Original language: Filipino
- No. of episodes: 80

Production
- Executive producers: Carlo L. Katigbak; Cory V. Vidanes; Laurenti M. Dyogi; Julie Anne R. Benitez
- Production location: Zamboanga City
- Running time: 20–40 minutes
- Production companies: ABS-CBN Studios; JRB Creative Production

Original release
- Network: Kapamilya Channel (Note: First released on Netflix and iWant that marketed as "advanced screening". Through its ABS-CBN licensing, it also airs on All TV as well as other affiliate blocktime channels and online platforms via Kapamilya Online Live through Facebook and YouTube. It is also available on-demand via iWant and internationally via The Filipino Channel.)
- Release: April 6 – July 24, 2026

Blood vs Duty is a Philippine action drama television series produced by JRB Creative Production. Directed by FM Reyes, Bjoy Balagtas and Rico Navarro, it stars Richard Gutierrez, Gerald Anderson, Bela Padilla, Barbie Imperial and Baron Geisler. It premiered on All TV (through its ABS-CBN licensing) and Kapamilya Channel's Primetime Bida evening block on April 6, 2026. The series concluded on July 24, 2026, with a total of 80 episodes.

== Premise ==
In the world of crime and justice, dangerous missions force those on opposite sides of the law to choose between protecting family and doing their duty.

== Cast and characters ==
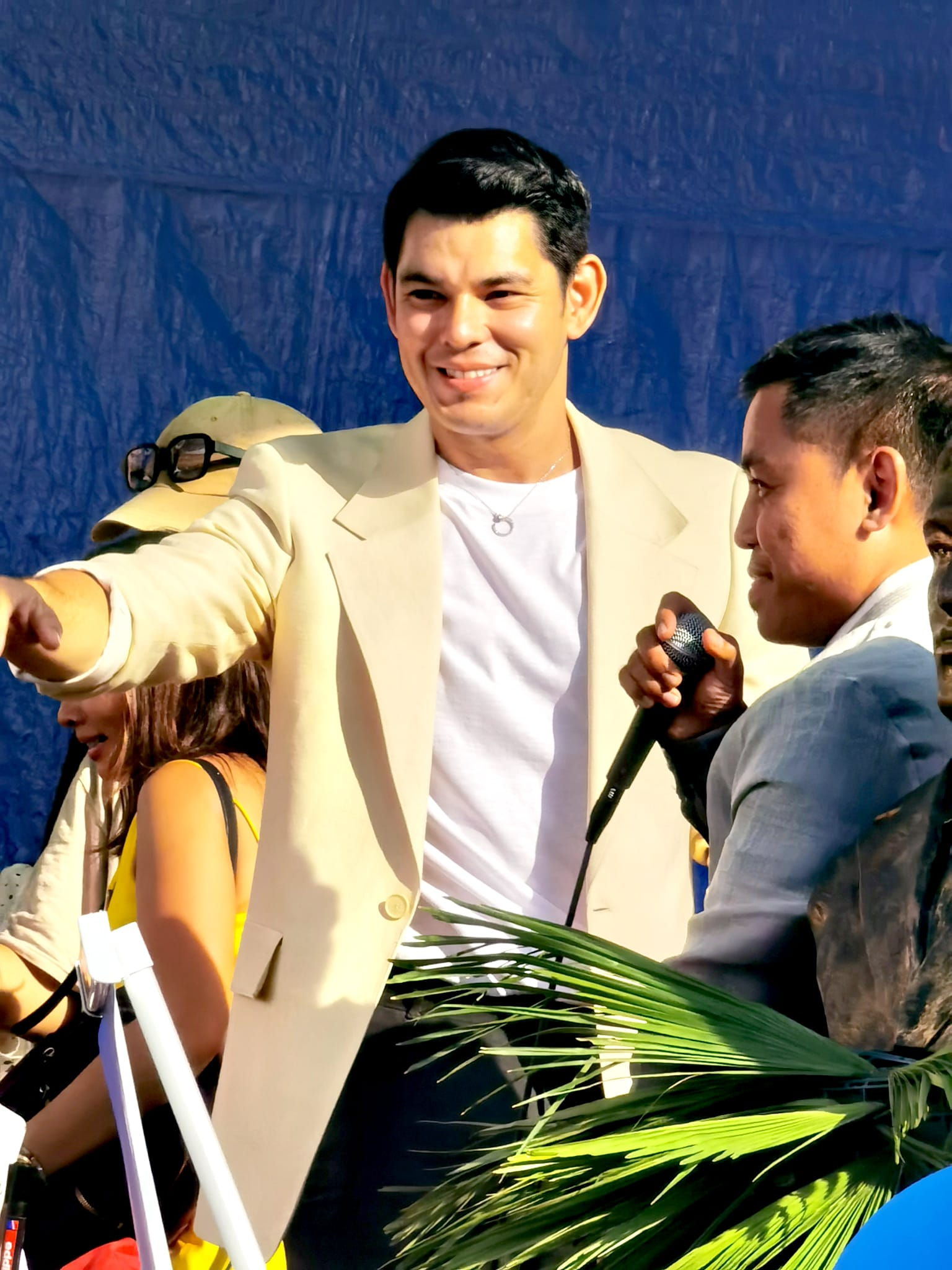
Richard Gutierrez

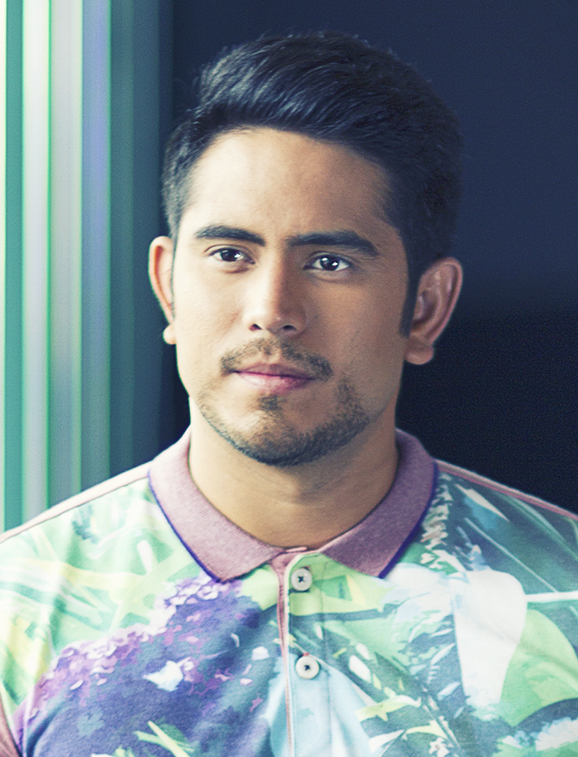
Gerald Anderson

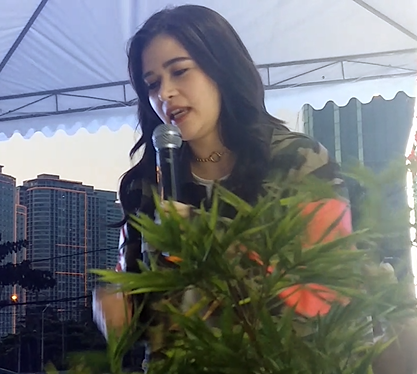
Bela Padilla

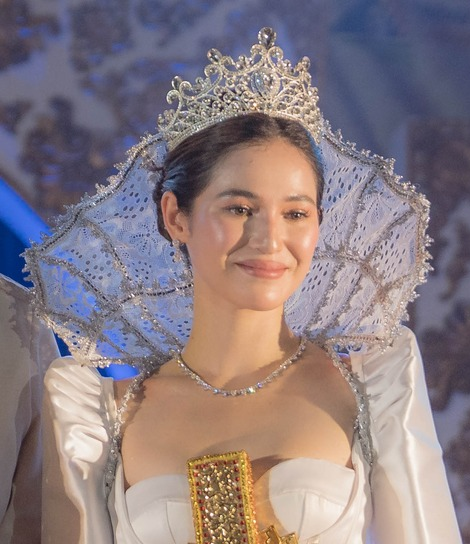
Barbie Imperial

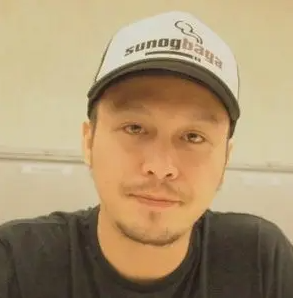
Baron Geisler

=== Final ===
Main cast

- Richard Gutierrez as Marcus Adrian Salazar Reyes
  - Jacob McKenzie as young Marcus
- Gerald Anderson as Jalil Abubakar/Wadi / P/Maj. Allan Espina (Note: The character's rank is based on R.A. No. 11200, the current law prescribing police ranks in the Philippines) / Gabriel Reyes
  - Iñigo Jose as teen Jalil / Gabriel
    - Gian Luca Geroue as young Jalil / Gabriel
- Baron Geisler as SPO4 Felix Domingo
  - Stanley Abuloc as young Felix
- Barbie Imperial as Jamillah Abubakar/Wadi

Supporting cast

- Zia Grace Bataan as Sitti
- Elmo Magalona as Agent Harold Rustia
- Ace Carrera as Buster
- Rommel Padilla as P/Dir. Gen. Emil Azuelo
- Edgar Mortiz as Omar
- Susan Africa as Dra. Theresa Reyes
  - Maika Rivera as young Theresa
- Ejay Falcon as SPO2 Usman Sabdani
- Junjun Quintana as SPO4 Sean Suarez
- Bodjie Pascua as P/Dir. Gen. Manuel Carillo (Ret.)
  - Karl Medina as young Manuel
- Malou Crisologo as Norhana
- Gerald Madrid as SPO2 Irvin Montes
- Zeppi Borromeo as Edrick (cameraman of Maya Mae Kalaw)
- Viveika Ravanes as Zubina
- Raul Montesa as P/Maj. Dionisio
- Kolette Madelo as Gracia
- JV Kapunan as Rashid Kaleem
- Binsoy Namoca as Ethan
- Rocky Labayen as Malik
- Gillian Vicencio as Mia Abdullah (Muslim vlogger)
- Zabel Lamberth as Soraya
- River Joseph as Agent Andre Flores
- Albie Casiño as SPO4 Liam Rodriguez
- LA Santos as Agent Ryan Cruz
- Lou Yanong as Agent Eve Castillo
- Arnel Carrion as P/Dir. Gen. Jose Villanueva
- Ruby Ruiz as Suher Sabdani (Usman's mother)
- Lei Ang as Raquel Olimpo (Manuel's sectary assistant)

Guest cast

- Apollo Abraham as PGen. Enrique Manalo
- Jon Co as P/Lt. Col. Ramon Paulino
- Marco Reginio as PO1 Jeffrey Jardin
- Marc Abaya as Axl Rosales
- Miguel Vergara as Kyle Azuelo (Gen. Emil Azuelo's son)
- Cheska Iñigo as Suzy Azuelo (Gen. Emil Azuelo's wife)
- Lui Manansala as Belen Rosales (Mother of Rosales brothers)
- Levi Ignacio as P/Maj. Gen. Dante Guerzon (Ret.)
- Ogie Diaz
- Mama Loi
- Ate Myrna
- Tamerlane Mopia as Peter
- Eric Fructuosoas P/Lt. Col. Roland Solares
- William Lorenzo as P/Maj. Gen. Leopoldo Ocampo
- Ramon Christopher as P/Lt. Gen. Vicente Madrigal
- Joel Molina as PO2 Madrid
- Agot Isidro as President Natalia Mendoza
- Elyson de Dios
- Tristan Ramirez
- Ashton Salvador
- Tootsy Angara as Maya Mae Kalaw

=== Former ===
Main cast

- Bela Padilla as Agent Lara Angeles
  - Stephanie de Groot as young Lara

Supporting cast

- Adrielle as Raon
- Jeremiah Cruz as Tanaon
- Igi Boy Flores as Dennis
- Alex Medina as Ramli
- Robin Padilla as Ahmad Mustapha
- Jaime Fabregas as Datu Rahman Abubakar
  - Nor Domingo as young Datu Rahman / Hasan Wadi

Guest cast

- Ian Ignacio as Pekla
- Geoff Eigenmann as Agent Oliver Lapeña
- Antonio Aquitania as SPO3 Patrick Marquez
- Dino Imperial as SPO2 Russel Contreras
- Emilio Daez as PO3 Mark Vinluan
- Kobie Brown as PO3 Wally Condecido
- Yves Flores as Tommy Rosales
- Joem Bascon as Jovi Rosales
- Giulio Di Martile as Goons of Metal 13
- Allan Villafuerte as P/Lt. Col. Luis Del Mundo
- Derrick Hubalde as Goons
- Mark "Big Mak" Andaya as Goons
- Jasmine Mendoza as Gemma
- Gaye Piccio as Norma
- Raven Rigor as Richard
- Marnie Lapus as Karen
- Noel Colet as Danilo
- Rafael Rosell as Victor Reyes (Marcus' and Gabriel's father)
- Peewee O'Hara as Lola Lilian (Harold's grandmother)
- Val Iglesias as Apo Sali
  - Manuel Chua as young Apo Sali
- Lance Lucido as Gabriel
- Justin Mclarie as Miggy
- Rave Victoria as CJ (Kyle's bully schoolmate)
- Gail Banawis as Jean Lapeña
- Joaquin Dela Cruz as Erick Lapeña
- Nikki Valdez as Lydia Santerva
- Nico Antonio as Benny Santerva
- Ryan Eigenmann as P/Lt. Col. Napoleon Marcelino (Manuel's illegitimate half brother)
- Alireza Libre as P/Lt. Col. Rolan dela Cruz

== Episodes ==
No.	Title	TV title	Original air date (Note: iWant shows two episodes first in advance before it broadcasts on TV while Netflix shows three episodes in advance.)
1	"The Interception"	"Mission"	April 6, 2026
2	"The Impending Storm"	"Massacre"	April 7, 2026
3	"The Massacre"	"Versus"	April 8, 2026
4	"The Aftermath"	"Pressumed Innocent"	April 9, 2026
5	"The Cost of Duty"	"The Cost"	April 10, 2026
6	"The Fire Witness"	"Witness"	April 13, 2026
7	"The Awakening"	"Awakening"	April 14, 2026
8	"The Clean-up"	"Abduction"	April 15, 2026
9	"The Abduction"	"The Chase"	April 16, 2026
10	"Crossroads"	"Cross Path"	April 17, 2026
11	"The Encounter"	"Encounter"	April 20, 2026
12	"The Pursuit"	"The Pursuit"	April 21, 2026
13	"Near Miss"	"Intensity"	April 22, 2026
14	"Suspect"	"Suspect"	April 23, 2026
15	"Target"	"Target"	April 24, 2026
16	"The Spy"	"The Spy"	April 27, 2026
17	"The Trail"	"The Trail"	April 28, 2026
18	"Underground"	"Underground"	April 29, 2026
19	"Captured"	"Duty Captured"	April 30, 2026
20	"The Fallen"	"Ahmad Mustapha"	May 1, 2026
21	"Viral"	"Viral"	May 4, 2026
22	"The Newcomer"	"Newcomer"	May 5, 2026
23	"The Selection"	"Selection"	May 6, 2026
24	"The Breaking Point"	"Breaking Point"	May 7, 2026
25	"First Mission"	"New TFA"	May 8, 2026
26	"Critical"	"Critical"	May 11, 2026
27	"Side by Side"	"Side by Side"	May 12, 2026
28	"The Rescue"	"The Rescue"	May 13, 2026
29	"The New TFA"	"Out Alive"	May 14, 2026
30	"Hidden Scars"	"Hidden Scars"	May 15, 2026
31	"The Next Mark"	"Next Mark"	May 18, 2026
32	"The Lion’s Den"	"Lion's Den"	May 19, 2026
33	"Buried"	"Buried"	May 20, 2026
34	"Maritime Tragedy"	"Maritime Tragedy"	May 21, 2026
35	"Seize"	"Seize"	May 22, 2026
36	"Masked"	"Shadows"	May 25, 2026
37	"Shadows"	"Hidden Scars"	May 26, 2026
38	"The Hunt"	"The Hunt"	May 27, 2026
39	"Higher-Ups"	"The Van Com"	May 28, 2026
40	"Shaken"	"Shaken"	May 29, 2026
41	"Surrender"	"Surrender"	June 1, 2026
42	"The Threat"	"Threat"	June 2, 2026
43	"Grief"	"Grief"	June 3, 2026
44	"Boiling Point"	"Boiling Point"	June 4, 2026
45	"Memories"	"Memories"	June 5, 2026
46	"The Unveiling"	"Unveiling"	June 8, 2026
47	"School Shooting"	"School Shooting"	June 9, 2026
48	"The Peril"	"Danger"	June 10, 2026
49	"Ripple Effect"	"Ripple Effect"	June 11, 2026
50	"Connections"	"Connections"	June 12, 2026
51	"Proximity"	"Closer"	June 15, 2026
52	"Sanction"	"Sanction"	June 16, 2026
53	"Counterplay"	"Counterplay"	June 17, 2026
54	"Ignition"	"Ignite"	June 18, 2026
55	"Cross-Current"	"Guarded"	June 19, 2026
56	"The Aquittal"	"Agenda"	June 22, 2026
57	"Free"	"Free"	June 23, 2026
58	"Visibility"	"Security"	June 24, 2026
59	"The Summit"	"The Summit"	June 25, 2026
60	"Benny and Lydia"	"Hostage"	June 26, 2026
61	"The Impact"	"The Impact"	June 29, 2026
62	"Battle with Demons"	"Torment"	June 30, 2026
63	"Calm Before the Storm"	"Missing Lara"	July 1, 2026
64	"Disarray"	"The Search"	July 2, 2026
65	"Call for Blood"	"Vengeance"	July 3, 2026
66	"The Shattered Wolf"	"Agent Lara"	July 6, 2026
67	"Fractured Lines"	"Confrontation"	July 7, 2026
68	"The Marked Man"	"Mustapha"	July 8, 2026
69	"Blood Trail"	"Blood Trail"	July 9, 2026
70	"Sychronized Chaos"	"Chaos"	July 10, 2026
71	"Losing Ground"	"Captive"	July 13, 2026
72	"The Missing Piece"	"Missing Piece"	July 14, 2026
73	"Checkmate"	"Checkmate"	July 15, 2026
74	"The Catalyst"	"Final Move"	July 16, 2026
75	"The Breaking Point"	"Exposed"	July 17, 2026
76	"Moments of Grief"	"Duty Grief"	July 20, 2026
77	"Brothers"	"Brothers"	July 21, 2026
78	"Inside the Truth"	"The Truth"	July 22, 2026
79	"The Point of No Return"	"Final Battle"	July 23, 2026
80	"The Final Battle"	"The Duty Lives On"	July 24, 2026

== Production ==
=== Development and casting ===
The series was announced on December 15, 2025, with Richard Gutierrez and Gerald Anderson in the lead roles with the working title Gutierrez x Anderson. On January 19, 2026, the official title was announced with the title Blood vs Duty and will be directed by FM Reyes. The series has now entered into script reading and look test for pre-production. On March 21, 2026, during the poster reveal, Bjoy Balagtas, and Rico Navarro were added as additional directors and Dindo C. Perez, Cenon Obispo Palomares, Jann Mendoza, and Shania Vozel Obenia will be the writers for the series with Erwin Tagle as action director.

It was announced on January 12, 2026, that Bela Padilla will join the series. On January 17, 2026, it was announced that Barbie Imperial was cast and will join the series. On January 18, 2026, Baron Geisler was added to the cast. Additional cast were Rommel Padilla, Ejay Falcon, Edgar Mortiz, Jaime Fabregas, Bodjie Pascua, Malou Crislogo, and Susan Africa.

The production team utilized artificial intelligence, particularly in enhancing backgrounds, which Gutierrez said is "inevitable" and should be acceptable. The move drew backlash online.

=== Filming ===
Principal photography commenced in Zamboanga City in February 2026.

== Release ==
The series were released first on Netflix on April 3, 2026 and on iWant on the following day for advanced episodes. It is currently airing on ALLTV2 (through its ABS-CBN licensing), Kapamilya Channel, and other television channels and platforms on April 6, 2026. The series consists of 80 episodes.
