= Pamilya Sagrado =

Philippine television drama series

- Season 2 Title card
- Genre: Family drama; Political thriller
- Written by: Genesis Rodriguez; Joel Mercado; Abi Lam-Parayno; Wilbert Christian Tan; Camille Anne de la Cruz
- Directed by: Lawrence Fajardo; Andoy L. Ranay; Rico Navarro; Coco Martin (Action scenes, finale week)
- Starring: Piolo Pascual; Kyle Echarri; Grae Fernandez
- Music by: Idonnah Villarico; Rommel Villarico
- Opening theme: "Ulit-ulit" by Regine Velasquez
- Composer: Jonathan Manalo
- Country of origin: Philippines
- Original language: Filipino
- No. of seasons: 2
- No. of episodes: 110

Production
- Executive producers: Carlo Katigbak; Cory Vidanes; Laurenti Dyogi; Roldeo Endrinal; Kylie Manalo-Balagtas; Rondel Lindayag
- Producers: Catherine Magdael-Abarrondo; Eleanor Martinez; Carlina dela Merced
- Production locations: Baguio; La Union; Subic
- Editor: Emerson Torres
- Camera setup: Single-camera
- Running time: 25–45 minutes
- Production company: Dreamscape Entertainment

Original release
- Network: Kapamilya Channel (Note: The series also airs on A2Z, TV5, and TFC and delayed telecast on Jeepney TV. It is also available for online streaming via Kapamilya Online Live and iWantTFC.)
- Release: June 17 – November 15, 2024

Pamilya Sagrado (transl. Sagrado Family, lit. 'Sacred Family'/International title: Sagrado) is a 2024 Philippine television drama thriller series broadcast by Kapamilya Channel. Directed by Lawrence Fajardo, Andoy L. Ranay and Rico Navarro, it stars Piolo Pascual, Kyle Echarri, and Grae Fernandez. It aired on the network's Primetime Bida line up and worldwide on TFC from June 17 to November 15, 2024.

== Plot ==
The storyline of Pamilya Sagrado explores themes of brotherhood, family loyalty, and the tension between morality and reputation. Set within the world of Freemasonry and hazing, it follows the Sagrado family as they navigate personal dilemmas that test their bonds and force them to choose between protecting their family's name and staying true to their principles.

== Cast and characters ==
Cast

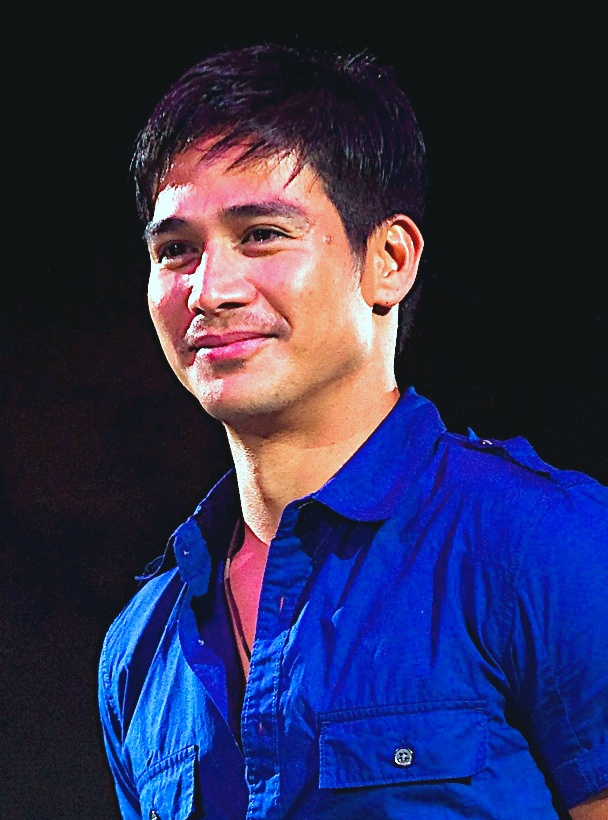
Piolo Pascual

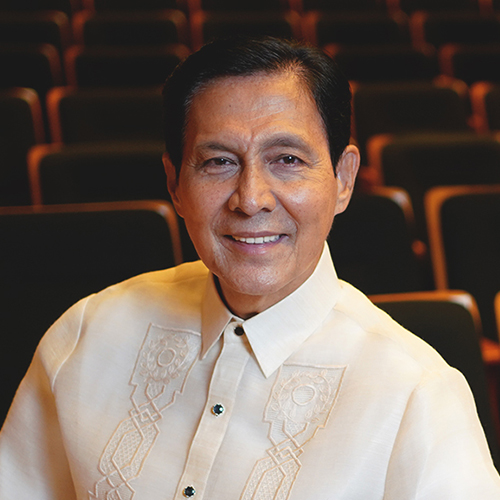
Tirso Cruz III

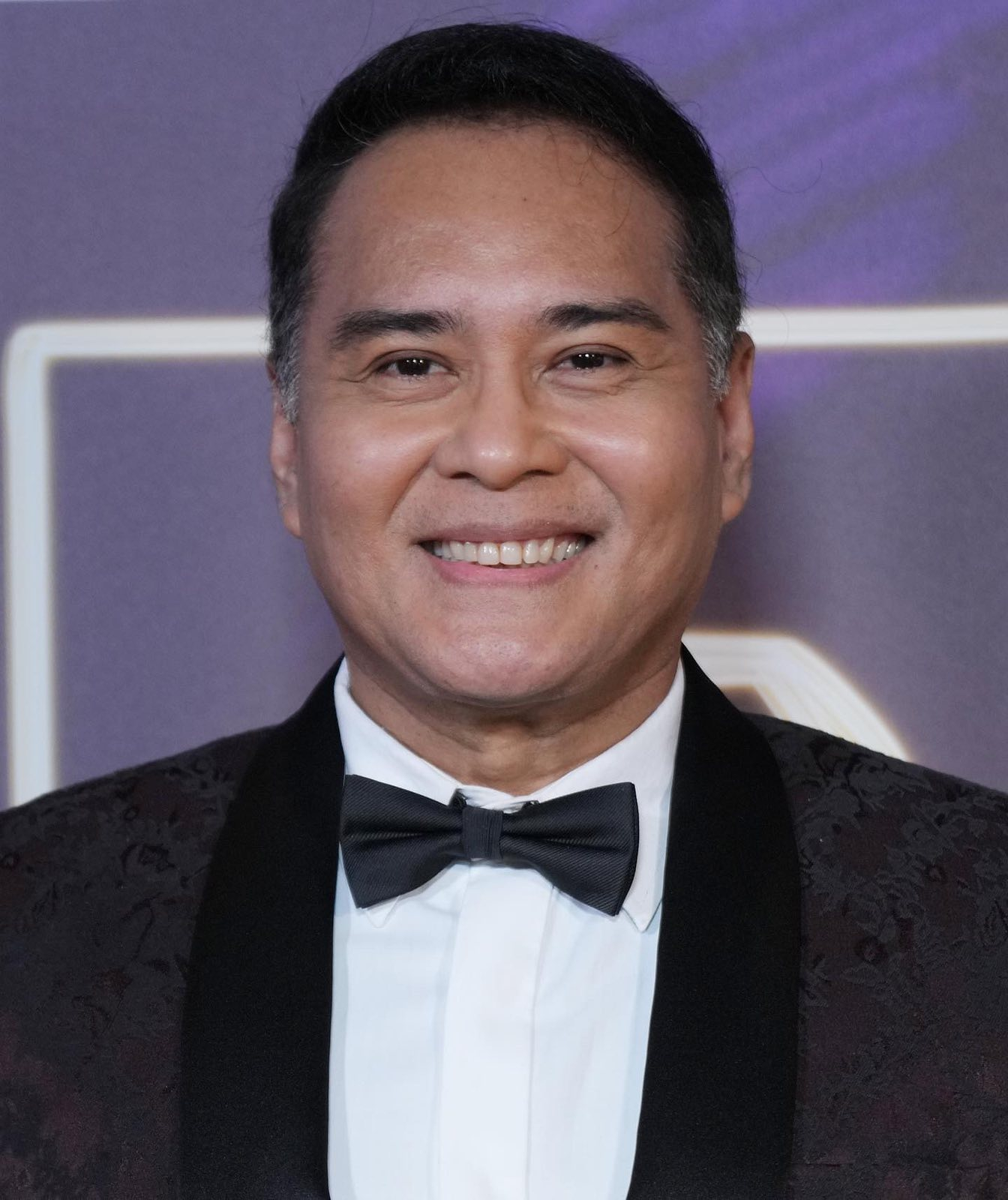
John Arcilla

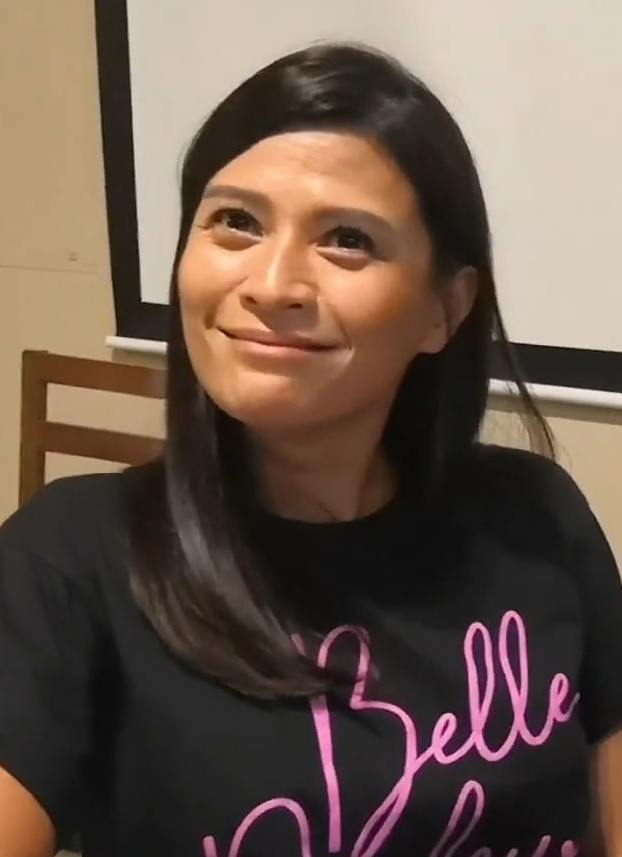
Mylene Dizon

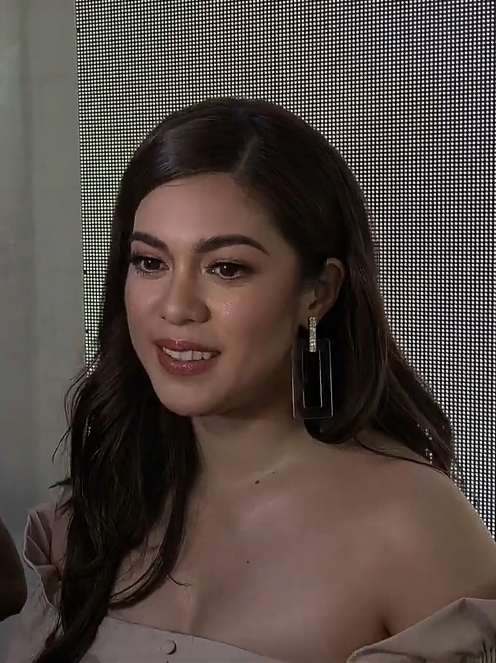
Shaina Magdayao

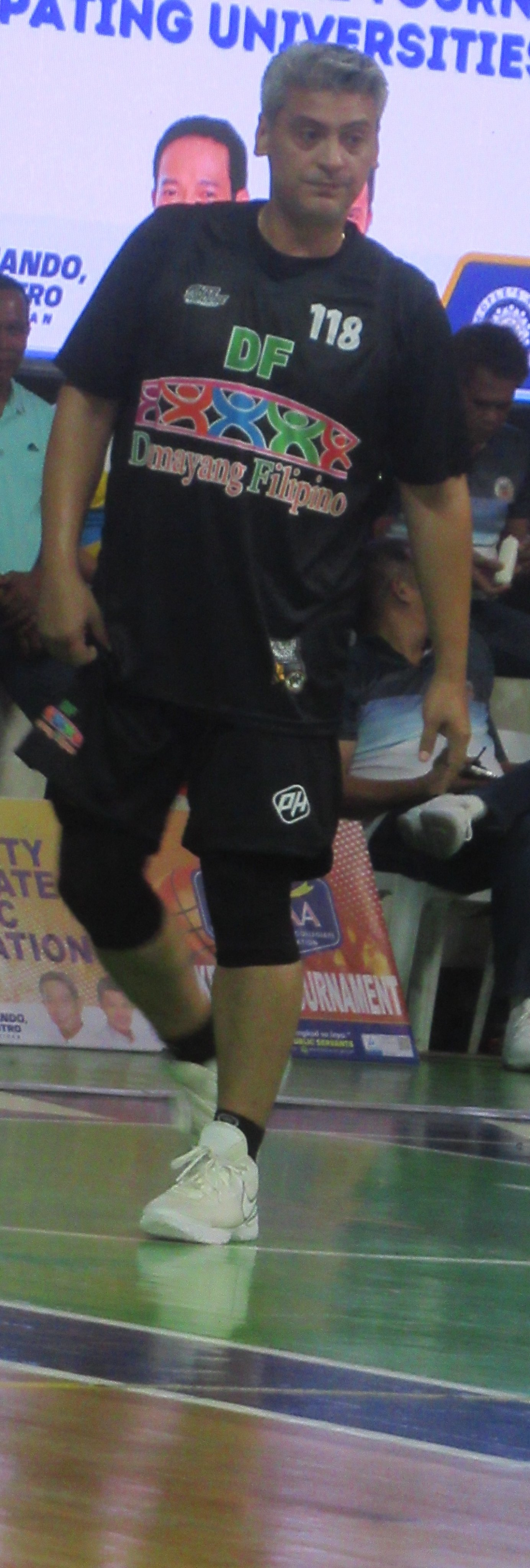
Joko Diaz

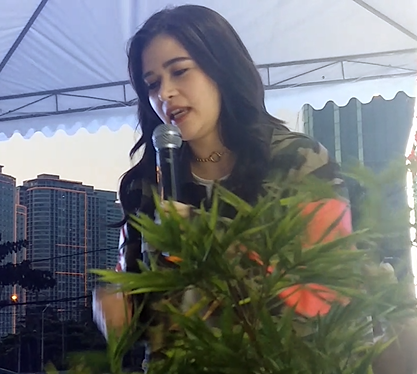
Bela Padilla

Main cast

- Piolo Pascual as Vice President (Note: Rafael assumes Vice Presidency after he won elections with his half-uncle Elias who won the Presidency. He assumed Presidency when the latter decides to step down as President for alleged corruption and for her daughter's safety. But he steps down as President after he confirms with Elias that allegations against Moises are not true.) Rafael Sagrado / Gabriel (Note: Rafael's alias when he and the Malonzos together with Maxene go to Pilapil to prevent the people there from recognizing him as the former President and related to the Sagrados. Grace gave him the alias Gabriel, introducing him as her husband.)
- Kyle Echarri as Moises "Moi" M. Sagrado / Sebastian / Baste (Note: Moises' alias when he, Grace, and Estong together with Rafael and Maxene go to Pilapil to prevent the people there from recognizing him due to the events back in Montecillo. Maxene introduced him to her friends and father as Sebastian, Baste for short per Moises.)
- Grae Fernandez as Second Son (Note: He obtains the title after his father Rafael won the Vice President position, but after his father assumes the Presidency following his half-granduncle Elias’ resignation, he automatically became the First Son.) Justin R. Sagrado
- Tirso Cruz III as Justice Secretary Jaime Sagrado (Note: He steps up as a father to Rafael and grandfather to Justin when Rafael's biological father Alfonso died. He is the younger brother of Alfonso and the older half-brother of Eleazar.)
- John Arcilla as President (Note: Eleazar won the Presidency where his half-nephew Rafael won the Vice Presidency. He resigns from his position after Jaime framed him for corruption and for his daughter's safety as well.) Eleazar "Elias" Sagrado
- Joel Torre as Ernesto "Estong" Malonzo (Note: Moises' adoptive father and biological grandfather after it was revealed that Moises is Cristine and Rafael's son.) / Emil (Note: Estong's alias when he, Moises, and Grace together with Rafael and Maxene go to Pilapil to prevent the people there from recognizing him as Moises' family. He is introduced as Moises' grandfather and Rafael's father-in-law.)
- Mylene Dizon as First Lady (Note: Mercedes obtains the first lady title after Rafael assumes presidency.) Mercedes Ramos-Sagrado
- Rosanna Roces as Nadia Salvacion
- Aiko Melendez as Atty. Divine Torres
- Shaina Magdayao as Grace Malonzo (Note: Moises' adoptive sister and biological aunt after it was revealed that Moises is Cristine and Rafael's son.) / Cristine (Note: Grace's alias when she, Moises, and Estong together with Rafael and Maxene go to Pilapil to prevent the people there from recognizing her as Moises' family. She introduced herself to everyone as Baste's (Moises) mother and Gabriel's (Rafael) wife. Her alias is from her deceased older sister, Cristine.)

Supporting cast

- Nikki Valdez as Kendi Velasco
- Joko Diaz as Diego Salvacion
- Jeremiah Lisbo as John Kelvin Velasco
- Daniela Stranner as Maxene Turiano
- Alyanna Angeles as Felicia Torres
- Miggs Cuaderno as Macario "Macky" Turiano
- Emilio Daez as Leon Arevalo Jr.
- Micaela Santos as First Daughter (Note: Danica assumes the title after her father Elias was elected as President.) Danica Sagrado
- Austin Cabatana as Jethro Morales
- River Joseph as Stevenson "Steven" Hermoso
- Valentino Jaafar as Tyrone Galarido
- Dustine Mayores as Caloy Galang
- Sean Tristan as EJ Zamora
- Isaiah dela Cruz as Rick Amante
- Renshi de Guzman as Aidan Moreno
- Luis Vera Perez as Gio Angeles
- Beaver Magtalas as Ethan Lim
- Angie Castrence as Lolit
- Apey Obera as Jelai Liwanag
- Ron Angeles as Maj. Vincent Velasquez
- Marvin Yap as Randy
- Micah Muñoz as Jess Velasco
- Iana Bernardez as Melanie Salvacion
- Claire Ruiz as Shaira Agustin
- Mark Manicad as Prof. Benedict Vargas
- Dalia Varde (Note: Credited as Dalia.) as Samantha "Sam" Macalintal
- Kei Kurosawa as Cristel Phillips
- John Joven Uy as Prof. Elmer
- Rocky Labayen as PCPL. Edgar Palermo
- JC Galano as PCPL. David Cortez
- Carlitos Siguion-Reyna as Gen. Leon Arevalo Sr.
- Myrza Sison as Malou Zamora
- Polo Ravales as Eric Marquez
- Race Matias as Agent Anthony Torralba
- Cris Villanueva as Henry Torres
- Rafa Siguion-Reyna as Atty. Corrales
- Jess Mendoza as Gilbert Ysrael
- Cheska Iñigo as Luzviminda "Minda" Bautista-Malonzo
- Zeppi Borromeo as Arman
- Ryan Eigenmann as Mayor Lorenzo Joaquin
- Ketchup Eusebio as Mattias Turiano
- Argel Saycon as Homer
- Marella Torre as Lisa
- Ross Pesigan as Oska
- Junjun Quintana as Lucas
- Maxine Trinidad as Queenie Paterno
- Angela Okol as Ronaliza "Rona" Cambahiran
- Bodjie Pascua as Sen. Juancho Veracruz (Note: A legislative ally of the Sagrados, he became the Vice President after Rafael assumes the Presidency and became the acting President when Rafael decides to step down as President.)
- Richard Quan as Dir. Gen. Ulysses Quijada
- Lui Villaruz as Agent Manny Callaga
- Marc Solis as Agent Jairo Castillo
- Patricia Ann Maglaya as Crowd Girl
- Kyla Marie Fernandez as Crowd Girl

Guest cast

- Bela Padilla as Cristine Malonzo / Cristine Pelaez
- JC Alcantara as Rolando "Roland" Salvacion
- Harvey Bautista as Percy de Leon
- Floyd Tena as Dr. Harvey Hermoso
- Nor Domingo as Dr. Yulo
- Jenny Miller as Janette Solis
- Al Gatmaitan as Atty. Manuel de Leon
- Jonic Magno as Lieutenant Rana

== Series overview ==
Season	Episodes	Originally released	
Season	Episodes	First released	Last released
1	55	June 17, 2024	August 30, 2024
2	55	September 2, 2024	November 15, 2024

== Episodes ==
=== Season 1 ===
No.	Title	TV title	Original air date	AGB Nielsen Ratings (NUTAM People)
1	"Kapatiran"	"Kapatiran"	June 17, 2024	7.2%
2	"Lihim"	"Lihim"	June 18, 2024	7.0%
3	"Newbie"	"Newbie"	June 19, 2024	7.6%
4	"Recruit"	"Recruit"	June 20, 2024	7.2%
5	"Initiation"	"Initiation"	June 21, 2024	7.7%
6	"Bantay"	"Bantay"	June 24, 2024	6.7%
7	"Pabor"	"Pabor"	June 25, 2024	7.2%
8	"Hell Night"	"Hell Night"	June 26, 2024	7.4%
9	"Kasapi"	"Kasapi"	June 27, 2024	7.1%
10	"Bistado"	"Bistado"	June 28, 2024	7.5%
11	"Pressure"	"Aaminin"	July 1, 2024	6.7%
12	"Takot"	"Patahimikin"	July 2, 2024	7.1%
13	"Kakampi"	"Kakampi"	July 3, 2024	7.7%
14	"Reputasyon"	"Kontrolado"	July 4, 2024	7.0%
15	"Eskandalo"	"Eskandalo"	July 5, 2024	7.7%
16	"Damage Control"	"Issue"	July 8, 2024	7.7%
17	"Overdose"	"Overdose"	July 9, 2024	7.1%
18	"Pagtulong"	"Tulong"	July 10, 2024	7.8%
19	"Kampanya"	"Kampanya"	July 11, 2024	7.3%
20	"Liham"	"Sulat"	July 12, 2024	6.7%
21	"Guilty"	"Guilty"	July 15, 2024	6.7%
22	"Pruweba"	"Hinala"	July 16, 2024	6.9%
23	"Tibok"	"Ebidensya"	July 17, 2024	7.1%
24	"Suhol"	"Suhol"	July 18, 2024	7.3%
25	"Botohan"	"Botohan"	July 19, 2024	7.2%
26	"Salpukan"	"Pag-amin"	July 22, 2024	7.3%
27	"Bistado"	"Bistado"	July 23, 2024	7.5%
28	"Arestado"	"Baliktarin"	July 24, 2024	7.1%
29	"Resbak"	"Hustisya"	July 25, 2024	7.5%
30	"Tapang"	"Tapang"	July 26, 2024	6.7%
31	"Setup"	"Set-up"	July 29, 2024	8.0%
32	"Loyalty"	"Loyalty"	July 30, 2024	7.2%
33	"Pugante"	"Pugante"	July 31, 2024	8.1%
34	"Hulicam"	"Hulicam"	August 1, 2024	7.6%
35	"Blackmail"	"Black Mail"	August 2, 2024	7.1%
36	"Traydor"	"Manhunt"	August 5, 2024	7.3%
37	"Bahid"	"Suporta"	August 6, 2024	7.1%
38	"Paglabag"	"Paglabag"	August 7, 2024	7.3%
39	"Pag-asa"	"Pag-asa"	August 8, 2024	7.9%
40	"Ingrato"	"Laglagan"	August 9, 2024	7.8%
41	"Pagsisinungaling"	"Sinungaling"	August 12, 2024	8.8%
42	"Kumpisal"	"Kumpisal"	August 13, 2024	8.2%
43	"Tagumpay"	"Inmate"	August 14, 2024	8.1%
44	"Banta"	"Ligpitin"	August 15, 2024	8.3%
45	"Konsensya"	"Ligtas"	August 16, 2024	8.3%
46	"Hukay"	"Hukay"	August 19, 2024	8.2%
47	"Sikreto"	"Konsensya"	August 20, 2024	8.3%
48	"Pagmulat"	"Mulat"	August 21, 2024	8.2%
49	"Giyera"	"Giyera"	August 22, 2024	8.3%
50	"Pagdukot"	"Pagdukot"	August 23, 2024	7.8%
51	"Paghaharap"	"Paghaharap"	August 26, 2024	8.8%
52	"Kasagutan"	"Puslit"	August 27, 2024	8.4%
53	"Anak"	"Kasangga"	August 28, 2024	7.6%
54	"Rebelasyon"	"Rebelasyon"	August 29, 2024	8.9%
55	"Kasunduan"	"Kasunduan"	August 30, 2024	8.0%

=== Season 2 ===
No.	Title	TV title	Original air date	AGB Nielsen Ratings (NUTAM People)
56	"Desisyon"	"Desisyon"	September 2, 2024	5.5%
57	"Tapusin"	"Tapusin"	September 3, 2024	N/A
58	"Patigasan"	"Patigasan"	September 4, 2024	N/A
59	"Duda"	"Kampihan"	September 5, 2024	N/A
60	"Sumpa"	"Bagong Pangulo"	September 6, 2024	N/A
61	"Dahas"	"Dahas"	September 9, 2024	N/A
62	"Panggap"	"Abuso"	September 10, 2024	N/A
63	"Frat War"	"Ang Presidente"	September 11, 2024	N/A
64	"Tuklas"	"Tuklas"	September 12, 2024	N/A
65	"Pagkakasala"	"Pagkakasala"	September 13, 2024	N/A
66	"Tiwala"	"Tiwala"	September 16, 2024	N/A
67	"Bawi"	"Bawi"	September 17, 2024	N/A
68	"Misyon"	"Takas"	September 18, 2024	N/A
69	"Pagbaliktad"	"Siwalat"	September 19, 2024	N/A
70	"Kompronta"	"Kompronta"	September 20, 2024	N/A
71	"Pagtatama"	"Pumanig"	September 23, 2024	N/A
72	"Haligi"	"Haligi"	September 24, 2024	N/A
73	"Ambush"	"Ambush"	September 25, 2024	N/A
74	"Kapalit"	"Kapalit"	September 26, 2024	N/A
75	"Wanted"	"Wanted"	September 27, 2024	N/A
76	"Pagtatagpo"	"Pagtatagpo"	September 30, 2024	N/A
77	"Pagpili"	"Pagpili"	October 1, 2024	N/A
78	"Lusob"	"Lusob"	October 2, 2024	N/A
79	"Paghahanda"	"Pilapil"	October 3, 2024	N/A
80	"Pagpapanggap"	"Pagtatagpo"	October 4, 2024	N/A
81	"Riot"	"Protesta"	October 7, 2024	N/A
82	"Pangarap"	"Pangarap"	October 8, 2024	N/A
83	"Pag-ibig"	"Pagsinta"	October 9, 2024	N/A
84	"Paninira"	"Palabas"	October 10, 2024	N/A
85	"Alas"	"Alas"	October 11, 2024	N/A
86	"Harapan"	"Harapan"	October 14, 2024	N/A
87	"Sorpresa"	"Sorpresa"	October 15, 2024	N/A
88	"Atake"	"Plano"	October 16, 2024	N/A
89	"Unbothered"	"Balita"	October 17, 2024	N/A
90	"Salakay"	"Salakay"	October 18, 2024	N/A
91	"Sagip"	"Kadugo"	October 21, 2024	N/A
92	"Bihag"	"Bihag"	October 22, 2024	N/A
93	"Pagkitil"	"Pagkitil"	October 23, 2024	N/A
94	"Pagbaliktad"	"Tiwalag"	October 24, 2024	N/A
95	"Regalo"	"Regalo"	October 25, 2024	N/A
96	"Kadugo"	"Kapatid"	October 28, 2024	N/A
97	"Reunion"	"Reunion"	October 29, 2024	N/A
98	"Teritoryo"	"Teritoryo"	October 30, 2024	N/A
99	"Sakripisyo"	"Sakripisyo"	October 31, 2024	N/A
100	"Ganti"	"Ganti"	November 1, 2024	N/A
101	"Paniningil"	"Paniningil"	November 4, 2024	N/A
102	"Timbog"	"Timbog"	November 5, 2024	N/A
103	"Ama"	"Ama"	November 6, 2024	N/A
104	"Protesta"	"Sumpaan"	November 7, 2024	N/A
105	"Tuso"	"Deception"	November 8, 2024	N/A
106	"Magkapatid"	"Justin vs. Moises"	November 11, 2024	N/A
107	"Katotohanan"	"President Elias"	November 12, 2024	N/A
108	"Pamilya"	"Rafael's Crossroads"	November 13, 2024	N/A
109	"Hustisya"	"Jaime's Downfall"	November 14, 2024	N/A
110	"Pagbabago"	"Wakas"	November 15, 2024	N/A

== Production ==
The series is one of the final projects that was executively produced by Roldeo Endrinal before his death on February 3, 2024.

=== Development ===
In December 2023, Pamilya Sagrado was announced by ABS-CBN, with Piolo Pascual, Kyle Echarri and Grae Fernandez in the lead roles. On January 15, 2024, the rest of the cast was unveiled in a story conference and media announcement. The series also marked the return of Aiko Melendez on the ABS-CBN network seven years after Wildflower and Bagani.

=== Filming ===
Filming began in March 2024 in La Union and Baguio.

In August 2024, it was reported that actor-director Coco Martin would later join the series as an action director.

== Release ==
=== Promotion ===
On May 13, 2024, Dreamscape Entertainment released a teaser on its social media platforms showing the capital letter "P", which pertains to the first letter of both the drama's title and the name of its lead actor. Another teaser was released on May 21 featuring the rivalry between two young characters.

On May 25, 2024, the official trailer was first shown to the public during the Bida Kapamilya Dreamscape Karavan event at Ayala Malls Cloverleaf. The trailer was officially released on television and social media platforms on May 27. The second official trailer was released on June 7, 2024.

On June 8, 2024, a grand launch event took place at the Gateway Mall 2 in Araneta City, where different activities were held, including a special celebrity screening, media conference, official poster reveal, and a mall show with the cast members.

=== Broadcast ===
Pamilya Sagrado premiered on June 17, 2024, on Kapamilya Channel's Primetime Bida evening block, replacing Linlang. It is also available worldwide via The Filipino Channel. The series is also available for streaming via iWantTFC, where advance episodes are released 48 hours ahead of its television release.

== Reception ==
=== Viewership ===
The pilot episode of the series garnered 443,269 peak live concurrent viewers on YouTube, livestreamed through ABS-CBN's Kapamilya Online Live. According to AGB Nielsen Philippines, the pilot episode received 7.2% nationwide ratings. The series registered its first victory against its timeslot rival on August 26, 2024, with an aggregated nationwide TV ratings of 8.8%.

=== Accolades ===
Award	Date	Category	Recipient(s)	Result	Ref.
Gawad Tanglaw Awards	December 17, 2025	Best Series	Pamilya Sagrado	Won	
Gawad Tanglaw Awards	December 17, 2025	Best Story	Pamilya Sagrado	Won	
Gawad Tanglaw Awards	December 17, 2025	Best Director	Lawrence Fajardo, Andoy Ranay, and Rico Navarro	Won	
Gawad Tanglaw Awards	December 17, 2025	Best Actor	Kyle Echarri	Won	
