= The Four Bad Boys and Me =

- Directed by: Benedict Mique
- Written by: Mique; Shania Vonzel Obena; Tina Lata
- Produced by: Carlo L. Katigbak; Cory Vidanes; Jamie C. Lopez; Laurenti M. Dyogi; Marissa Kalaw
- Starring: Anji Salvacion; Gelo Rivera; Harvey Bautista; Dustine Mayores; River Joseph
- Edited by: Noah Tonga
- Production companies: ABS-CBN; LoneWolf Films
- Release date: July 31, 2025
- Running time: 111 minutes
- Country: Philippines
- Language: Tagalog

The Four Bad Boys and Me is a 2025 teen romantic comedy film starring Anji Salvacion, Gelo Rivera, Harvey Bautista, Dustine Mayores, and River Joseph. The cast also includes Brent Manalo, AC Bonifacio, Analain Salvador, Gela Alonte, and Krystal Brimner. Based on a Wattpad novel by Filipino author Tina Lata under the pen name blue_maiden, the film was produced by ABS-CBN and LoneWolf Films. On the latter's YouTube channel, the film made its global premiere on July 31, 2025. Four Bad Boys received negative reviews from film journalists, who mainly criticized the acting.

== Plot ==
High school senior Candice experiences a "glow-up" and finds herself at the center of attention from the most popular boys in school.

== Cast ==
- Anji Salvacion as Candice Gonzales
- Gelo Rivera as Jeydon Lopez
- Harvey Bautista as Marky Lim
- Dustine Mayores as Troy Mendoza
- River Joseph as Charles Gonzales
- AC Bonifacio as Tiffany
- Gela Alonte as Jaycee Lopez
- Brent Manalo as Lucas
- Krystal Brimner as Kim
- Analain Salvador

== Production ==
The Four Bad Boys and Me is based on a Wattpad novel by Tina Lata, known by her pen name blue_maiden. The novel was inspired by the Taiwanese television series Meteor Garden (2001) and has reportedly garnered more than 326 million reads as of 2025. According to the film's director Benedict Mique, the cast members underwent a series of auditions before being cast in Four Bad Boys. Four Bad Boys was produced by ABS-CBN and LoneWolf Films. Lata and Mique are credited for writing the script alongside Shania Vonzel. Carlo L. Katigbak, Cory Vidanes, Jamie C. Lopez, Laurenti M. Dyogi, and Marissa Kalaw served as producers, with editing by Noah Tonga. Four Bad Boys is 111 minutes long.

The film marked Gelo Rivera's acting debut; at a press conference, he stated that was selected to portray Jeydon Lopez, one of the film's titular "bad boys", despite having no acting experience or workshop training prior. Filming took place in September 2024.

== Promotion and release ==
A media conference for The Four Bad Boys and Me was scheduled on July 22, 2025, but postponed due to heavy rain; it was held on July 25 instead. On July 29, early access to The Four Bad Boys and Me was provided to ABS-CBN's Super Kapamilya (lit. 'Super Family Member') members on YouTube. It made its global premiere on July 31 on ABS-CBN Entertainment's YouTube channel. It is ABS-CBN's first YouTube original film.

== Reception ==
The Four Bad Boys and Me received negative reviews from film critics. Julienne Loreto of &Asian called the film "charmless, a bore, and a chore to finish". They panned technical aspects of Four Bad Boys such as writing, direction, and acting, though they complimented Bautista's, Bonifacio's, Mayores', and Brimner's performances. Writing for the Daily Tribune, Eliana Licap said that "awkward performances" led to the film's "flop".
