= ABS-CBN Studios =

Entertainment division of ABS-CBN Corporation

- Logo used since April 6, 2024
- Type: Division
- Industry: Design agency; Filmmaking; Television production; Broadcast syndication; Distribution
- Founded: January 5, 1962; 64 years ago
- Headquarters: ABS-CBN Broadcasting Center, Sgt. Esguerra Avenue corner Mother Ignacia Street, Diliman, Quezon City, Metro Manila, Philippines
- Area served: Worldwide
- Key people: Carlo L. Katigbak and Cory Vidanes (Executive Producers); Laurenti M. Dyogi (Head of Entertainment Division); Robert Labayen (Head, Creative Communications Management); Karlo Victoriano (Motion Graphic Artist, Creative Communications Management)
- Products: Television programs; Motion pictures
- Parent: ABS-CBN Corporation
- Divisions: ABS-CBN Creative Communications Management; ABS-CBN International Production; Dreamscape Entertainment; Star Creatives; RSB Drama Unit; JRB Creative Production; RCD Narratives
- Website: www.abs-cbn.com/studios

ABS-CBN Studios (also known as ABS-CBN Entertainment, ABS-CBN Entertainment Group, ABS-CBN Entertainment Department, ABS-CBN Production, or simply ABS-CBN) is a Philippine film, television production and distribution unit of the entertainment division of ABS-CBN Corporation.

== History and structure ==
The unit was founded on January 5, 1962 with Mga Bayani sa Kalawakan as its first program. Carlo L. Katigbak and Cory Vidanes, ABS-CBN President and CEO, and COO for Broadcast respectively, are the executive producers of the division, and Laurenti Dyogi (who also heads the network's talent agency Star Magic) is the head. The division also has ABS-CBN Creative Communications Management headed by Robert Labayen which is responsible for designing and animating graphics for the network's programs, promos, station identities, and bumpers therefore ABS-CBN Studios is also the media company's and network's in-house design agency and ABS-CBN International Production for its series creation and distribution to the international market.

The division is also simply known as "ABS-CBN" and formerly used on its YouTube account from July 15, 2008 to 2014 that distributes archived entertainment content, teasers, episodes and highlights of the network's shows and later since August 1, 2020, livestreams the web-based channel Kapamilya Online Live. It then began to identify itself as ABS-CBN Entertainment on a said account and website in 2014, and as distributor in January 2021 when it started to distribute its programs to broadcast companies like ZOE Broadcasting Network, Advanced Media Broadcasting System, GMA Network Inc., and TV5 Network Inc. The latter name is also used for its Twitter account.

On December 13, 2023, during the ABS-CBN's Christmas special, it was announced that the entertainment division would adapt the ABS-CBN Studios as distributor, with ABS-CBN Entertainment is now used concurrently with the ABS-CBN Studios name. The new name, logo, and opening billboard were first used in January 2024 starting with Project: Zoomers and officially with Linlang: The Teleserye Version, then later on April 6, the new simplified OBB, same as ABS-CBN Entertainment was currently used since It's Showtime.

As of 2024, there are currently seven divisions of ABS-CBN Studios in operation, with GMO Entertainment Unit being defunct on March 22, 2019 and was replaced by RCD Narratives.

== Production works ==
Logo used as ABS-CBN Entertainment since 2014.

Logo used from December 1, 2023 to 2024.

=== TV series ===
Title	Release date	Director(s)	Cast(s)	Genre(s)	Co-producer(s)
Love at First Spike	June 20, 2025	Ivan Andrew Payawal	Emilio Daez, Reign Parani, Sean Tristan, and River Joseph	Romantic comedy	
Ghosting	July 19, 2025	Theodore Boborol	Fyang Smith, JM Ibarra, Vivoree Esclito, Zach Guerrero, Gello Marquez, and Kobie Brown	Romantic comedy	
The Silent Noise	March 20, 2026	Onat Diaz	Angelica Panganiban, Zanjoe Marudo, Mutya Orquia, Zaijian Jaranilla, and KD Omalin	Family; Crime	
Love Is Never Gone	May 8, 2026	Emmanuel Palo and Jojo Saguin	Joshua Garcia and Ivana Alawi		Dreamscape Entertainment
Miss Behave	June 3, 2026	Ivan Andrew Payawal	Alexa Ilacad, Xyriel Manabat, Reign Parani, Rans Rifol, and Andi Abaya	Comedy	
The Loyalty Game	July 3, 2026	Mae Cruz-Alviar	Janine Gutierrez and Jericho Rosales	Psychological	Star Creatives
Honor Thy Mother	September 11, 2026	Onat Diaz and Dolly Dulu	Sharon Cuneta, Barbie Forteza	Family drama	Dreamscape Entertainment; GMA Pictures
Kopino	November 2026		Paulo Avelino and Kim Chiu		Dreamscape Entertainment

=== Reality ===
Title	Release date	Genre(s)
Come Dine With Me: Celebrity Philippines	July 23, 2026	Reality show

=== Microdrama ===
Title	Release date	Director(s)	Cast(s)	Genre(s)	Co-producer(s)
The Chambermaid's Daughter	April 30, 2026	Theodore Boborol	Alexa Ilacad and Gelo Rivera	Romantic comedy	
Will You Fake Marry Me	June 30, 2026	Jojo Saguin	JM Ibarra and Fyang Smith	Romantic comedy	
A Cake to Remember	August 28, 2026	Emerald Silvestre	Francine Diaz and Seth Fedelin	Romantic comedy	JRB Creative Production
Coach Me Maybe	TBA	Theodore Boborol	Rave Victoria and Lance Jeremy	Romance	
Dead Girl Walking	TBA	TBA		TBA	JRB Creative Production

=== Films ===
==== 2024 ====
Title	Release date	Director(s)	Cast(s)	Genre(s)	Associated film production(s)
Un/Happy for You	August 14, 2024	Petersen Vargas	Joshua Garcia and Julia Barretto	Romantic drama	Star Cinema; Viva Films
Hello, Love, Again	November 13, 2024	Cathy Garcia-Sampana	Kathryn Bernardo and Alden Richards	Romantic drama	Star Cinema; GMA Pictures
And the Breadwinner Is...	December 25, 2024	Jun Robles Lana	Vice Ganda	Comedy drama	Star Cinema; The IdeaFirst Company

==== 2025 ====
Title	Release date	Director(s)	Cast(s)	Genre(s)	Associated film production(s)
Sosyal Climbers	February 27, 2025	Jason Paul Laxamana	Maris Racal and Anthony Jennings	Romantic comedy	–
My Love Will Make You Disappear	March 26, 2025	Chad Vidanes	Kim Chiu and Paulo Avelino	Romantic comedy	Star Cinema
The Four Bad Boys and Me	July 31, 2025	Benedict Mique	Anji Salvacion, Gelo Rivera, River Joseph, Harvey Bautista, and Dustine Mayores	Romantic comedy	Lonewolf Films
Meet, Greet & Bye	November 12, 2025	Cathy Garcia-Sampana	Piolo Pascual, Belle Mariano, Joshua Garcia, Juan Karlos Labajo, and Maricel Soriano	Family drama	Star Cinema
Call Me Mother	December 25, 2025	Jun Lana	Vice Ganda and Nadine Lustre	Comedy drama	Star Cinema; The Ideafirst Company; Viva Films
Love You So Bad	December 25, 2025	Mae Cruz-Alviar	Will Ashley, Bianca de Vera, and Dustin Yu	Romance	Star Cinema; GMA Pictures; Regal Entertainment

==== Upcoming ====
Title	Release date	Director(s)	Cast(s)	Genre(s)	Status	Associated film production(s)	Ref
Nang Mapagod si Kamatayan	TBA	Dan Villegas	Daniel Padilla and Zanjoe Marudo	Buddy film, Black Comedy	Pre-production	Star Cinema; Quantum Films	

== Production divisions ==
=== Current divisions ===
- ABS-CBN Creative Communications Management
- ABS-CBN International Production
- Dreamscape Entertainment
- Star Creatives Television
- RSB Drama Unit
- JRB Creative Production
- RCD Narratives

=== Former division ===
- GMO Entertainment Unit

== Partner entities ==
Free-to-air Platforms

- ZOE Broadcasting Network
- Advanced Media Broadcasting System
- TV5 Network Inc. (MediaQuest Holdings, Inc.)
- GMA Network Inc.

Streaming Platforms

- Netflix
- Viu
- Amazon Prime Video
- iQIYI
- WeTV iflix
- YouTube

== International distribution ==
ABS-CBN International Production is responsible for distributing a variety of ABS-CBN Studios productions, mostly teleseryes, internationally. It is headed by Ruel S. Bayani that also leads RSB Drama Unit, another production company of ABS-CBN Studios. Currently, it had sold more than 50,000 hours of contents to over 50 countries. Most of these series air in English in certain territories as well as other local languages. Tayong Dalawa became the first Philippine series to air in Singapore in 2010. Lobo became the first Philippine series to air in Thailand in 2012. Sana'y Wala Nang Wakas managed to get higher ratings than Smallville in Malaysia. Bridges of Love became a ratings success when it aired on Latina Televisión in Peru in 2016, achieving 26% share. Actors and actresses from ABS-CBN's productions have even won international awards.
