= Tayo sa Wakas =

2026 Philippine romantic drama film by Cathy Garcia-Sampana

- Theatrical release poster
- Directed by: Cathy Garcia-Sampana
- Written by: Vanessa R. Valdez
- Produced by: Katherine S. Labayen
- Starring: Belle Mariano; Donny Pangilinan
- Cinematography: Yves R. Jamero
- Edited by: Marya Ignacio
- Music by: Jessie Q. Lasaten
- Production companies: ABS-CBN Studios; Star Cinema
- Distributed by: ABS-CBN Film Productions
- Release date: 27 May 2026
- Running time: 113 minutes
- Country: Philippines
- Language: Filipino
- Box office: ₱110 million

Tayo sa Wakas (English: Us in the End) is a 2026 Philippine romantic drama film directed by Cathy Garcia-Sampana from a story and screenplay written by Vanessa R. Valdez. The film stars Belle Mariano and Donny Pangilinan (collectively known as DonBelle) in lead roles, with the supporting cast includes Epy Quizon, Joross Gamboa, River Joseph, Yayo Aguila, Allan Paule, and Matthew Mendoza. The story follows a couple who set out on a final "break-up journey" to determine whether to end their relationship or strive to make it after years of drifting apart due to conflicting goals.

Produced by ABS-CBN Studios and Star Cinema and distributed by ABS-CBN Film Productions, the film was theatrically released on 27 May 2026 as the film studio's 33rd founding anniversary offering.

== Plot ==
Cisco and Cheska, a long-time couple who were once partners in both life and career, are forced to confront how their growing ambitions have led them onto conflicting paths. As emotional distance gradually drives them apart, they embark on their long-promised “breakup trip” to determine whether they should finally let go of each other or make one last attempt to fight for their relationship.

== Cast ==
=== Main cast ===
- Donny Pangilinan as Francisco "Cisco" Serrano
- Belle Mariano as Francisca "Cheska" Alegre

=== Supporting cast ===
- Epy Quizon as Mr. G
- Yayo Aguila as Mela
- Allan Paule as Pocholo
- Joross Gamboa as JC
- River Joseph as Shane
- Matthew Mendoza as Kiki
- Jude Hinumdum as Bonj
- Emilio Daez as Mookie
- Miah Canton as Tina
- Chase Vega as Rafa Alegre

== Production ==
Vanessa R. Valdez, the film's writer, revealed that the concept dates back to 2018 and was initially intended for a different love team. She added that she and her team continued to refine the idea over time, concentrating on finding the best love tandem to carry it out.

Tayo Sa Wakas was described as DonBelle’s most mature project to date. Speaking at the Grand MediaCon on 02 May 2026, director Cathy Garcia-Sampana admitted that the film demanded a deeper, more complex performance from Pangilinan and Mariano.

== Music ==
On May 8, 2026, the official soundtrack (OST) launch and exclusive fan meet for Tayo sa Wakas was held at the Quezon Club of Solaire Resort North.

The film’s main theme song was described as a passionate rendition of Wency Cornejo’s classic song Hanggang, performed by Juan Karlos.

During the soundtrack launch, DonBelle stated that they were closely involved in the album’s development from its conceptualization, describing it as a project created with significant care and collaboration. The soundtrack features performances by artists including Angeline Quinto, JL of BGYO, Jeremy G, Kolette Madelo, Miah Canton, and Belle Mariano, and was designed to reflect the emotional progression and relationship stages portrayed in the film.

== Marketing ==
Touted as the DonBelle loveteam's cinematic return since An Inconvenient Love in 2022, an official announcement teaser of the film was released on 16 February 2026 via Star Cinema's social media platforms (including YouTube). Eighteen hours after its release, it received a total of 5.9 million cumulative views.

DonBelle announced on April 27, 2026, through their interview on Paano Ba 'To?!, a podcast byBianca Gonzalez, that the film was their last project as an onscreen tandem for now, both saying it’s a mutual decision.

Advance ticket sales for Tayo sa Wakas began through the film's official website ahead of its release, coinciding with the nationwide "The Road to Wakas" mall tour.

DonBelle drew huge crowds in Zamboanga City, Antipolo, and Bulacan. The mall tours continued in Cotabato, Pampanga, Cavite, Cebu, Iloilo and Bacolod.

Following its Philippine theatrical debut on 27 May 2026, the film was scheduled for an international rollout beginning in Australia and New Zealand on 11 June 2026. According to Star Cinema, screenings in the United States, Canada, and Guam were set to follow on 12 June 2026, while releases in Hong Kong and Macau were scheduled to begin on 20 June 2026. Additional screenings were also planned across the Middle East, Singapore, Malaysia, and Taiwan, with further territories still being finalized at the time of the announcement. The overseas expansion reflected the film’s anticipated appeal among Filipino communities abroad and the growing international audience of the DonBelle screen partnership.

== Release ==
The world premiere of Tayo sa Wakas was held on 26 May 2026 at SM Megamall, attended by lead stars Donny Pangilinan and Belle Mariano, director Cathy Garcia-Sampana, and members of the supporting cast. The event also drew the attendance of family members of the lead actors, fellow actors, musicians, television personalities, and former reality-show contestants. Among the notable guests were Vice Ganda, Olivia M. Lamasan, Julia Barretto, Maris Racal, members of the P-pop group BINI, and the band Dilaw. ABS-CBN executives, including Carlo Katigbak, Cory Vidanes, and Mark Lopez, also attended the premiere and joined in recognizing the film's cast and creative team.

== Reception ==
=== Box office ===
Advance ticket earnings reached 2.2 million pesos as of 10 am of May 27.

On its May 27 opening day, the film earned 12 million pesos at the box office from 200 cinemas, marking the highest opening gross for a local Filipino film in 2026. On its second day, it was announced that the film would be screened in 250 cinemas. The film grossed over 25 million pesos on its third day.

The film's opening surpassed DonBelle's previous theatrical release, An Inconvenient Love (over ₱15 million) in 2022. It also performed similarly to last year's My Love Will Make You Disappear, which grossed ₱40 million domestically from Wednesday to Saturday.

On 5 June 2026, Star Cinema announced that the film had breached the P70-million mark in its first week. The film is also set for release in Australia, New Zealand, United States, Canada, Guam, Hong Kong, Macau, Taiwan, Malaysia, and the Middle East in mid-June

As of 19 June 2026, after three weeks in the box office, the film breached the PhP 110 million mark, as reported by ABS-CBN.

=== Audience response ===
The opening day of Tayo sa Wakas was marked by strong audience support, drawing large crowds through organized block screenings. DonBelle received attention after sharing an emotional moment with a 93-year-old fan who attended one of the screenings, highlighting the film’s broad audience appeal. In addition to fan clubs, advocacy organizations such as World Vision and Call to Rescue participated in the opening-day screenings.

=== Critical response ===
Critics gave the film mixed-to-positive reviews.

Andrea Dee, writing for Pulp Magazine, collectively described DonBelle, saying: "(They) have always been a power tandem."

Nazamel Tabares, writing for Pelikula Mania, described the film as DonBelle's "best so far," with praise directed toward their performances.

Goldwin Reviews gave the film a starred review of 4/5 stars, describing: "It starts with the usual romcom vibes, then leaning into more serious phase, showing more maturity, and eventually confronting the deeper drama."

Film Geek Guy wrote: "The film could've benefited from a tighter narrative, but it managed to conclude with a satisfying ending."

Rod Magaru wrote: "Star Cinema has mastered the art of the commercial romance—giving us the comforting rhythms of meet-cutes, predictable conflicts, and the inevitable chase through an airport or a rainstorm" and the film "bravely strips away the glossy armor of the traditional love team to expose something far more fragile, gritty, and undeniably human."

Maura Rodriguez, writing for L'Officiel Philippines, wrote: Tayo sa Wakas is "a love story without the innocence that often defines young-screen romance: no first crushes, no easy kilig, only the uneasy terrain of adulthood, memory, and the question of whether love can survive the distance between who two people were and who they have become.

Stephanie Mayo, writing for The Daily Tribune, gave the film a 2 out of 5 stars rating, writing: "DonBelle delivers, but the script sabotages its own love story."

Philbert Dy writing for SPOT.ph gave a two-star review, criticizing its narrative structure, emphasis on the characters' toxic relationship, and depiction of the advertising industry, arguing that these elements overshadowed the film's central romance. He concluded that the film was "undone by its excesses" and "seems to forget that maybe romance should be the focus of a romantic film."

Teamsuper also criticized the script saying: "The script’s formulaic nature is the main limitation. It hits familiar beats predictably, which makes some emotional arcs feel safe rather than surprising."

CBO gave a 3 out of 5 stars, praising the leads’ performances, particularly Belle Mariano as “the heart and soul of the movie,” while criticizing the film for relying on familiar romantic-drama tropes and a predictable ending, ultimately concluding that it “gave DonBelle a decent space to take on more mature roles.”

Maganda Ba? rated the film as "Napakaganda" saying that "it's heartfelt, relatable, and emotionally rewarding."

Wanggo Gallaga, writing for Click The City, rated the film 2.5 out of 5 stars and described Tayo sa Wakas as a “beautifully acted drama” driven by the “undeniable, explosive chemistry” between the lead cast, praising Belle's nuanced performance and Donny’s effectiveness in the film’s more dramatic scenes. However, he criticized the film for centering and humanizing Cisco’s perspective, arguing that it romanticizes a toxic male character and leaves Cheska’s viewpoint underdeveloped, resulting in what he viewed as an imbalanced narrative. Meanwhile, Click The City average user rating and reviews gave the movie 5 out of 5 stars (as of May 30).
