= AC Bonifacio =

Filipino-Canadian actress, and singer-dancer (born 2002)

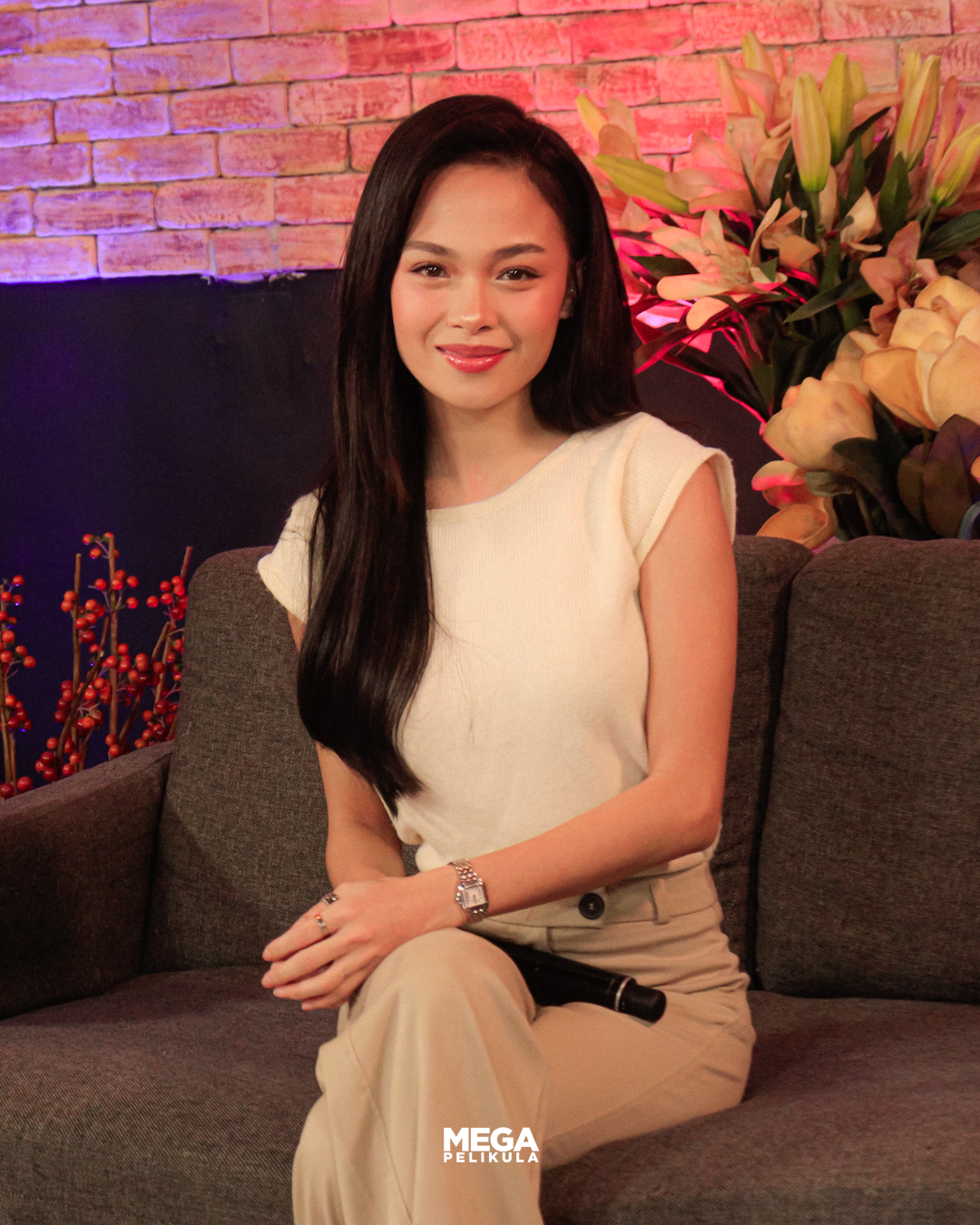
- Bonifacio in 2025
- Born: Andree Camille Bonifacio (Note: AC Bonifacio was born in Canada. Thus, she does not possess her mother's maiden name.); December 13, 2002 (age 23); Vancouver, British Columbia, Canada
- Citizenship: Philippines; Canada
- Occupations: Dancer; singer; actress; host
- Years active: 2013–present
- Musical career
- Genre: P-pop
- Instruments: Vocals
- Label: Star Music
- Bonifacio's live singing voice Bonifacio singing "I Speak Six Languages" from The 25th Annual Putnam County Spelling Bee on Rappler Live Jam; Recorded March 2024

Andree Camille Bonifacio (Tagalog: [ˈeɪsi bonɪˈfaʃo]; born December 13, 2002) is a Canadian-born Filipino dancer, singer, actress, and YouTuber known for being the first ever grand champion of Filipino TV dance competition Dance Kids along with Lucky Ancheta In 2016. The duo was called "Lucky Aces." Before winning the said competition, the duo was featured on The Ellen DeGeneres Show and had a chance to meet and perform with American popstar Ariana Grande on Grande's show in Vancouver, British Columbia in 2015. Bonifacio also competed on the Kids edition of Philippine TV Show Your Face Sounds Familiar, where she finished as 3rd placer. She also made her acting debut on Wansapanataym Presents: The Amazing Ving in which she played "Mika".

In 2024, Bonifacio made her musical theater debut as Marcy Park in the Philippine adaptation of The 25th Annual Putnam County Spelling Bee. She received critical acclaim for her performance.

== Early life and education ==
Andree Camille Bonifacio was born and raised in Vancouver, British Columbia, Canada. AC went to Queensborough Middle School in New Westminster, British Columbia. She is a Hall of Famer in Los Angeles, California.

== Career ==
=== 2013–2015: Lucky Aces and Ellen DeGeneres Show Guesting ===
Bonifacio, along with Lucky Ancheta, formed the dancing tandem Lucky Aces in 2012 and started making YouTube videos. They also competed in various local and international dance contests. They became popular when their YouTube videos went viral on Vine. In 2015, they were invited to perform on The Ellen DeGeneres Show and were given a chance to perform with Ariana Grande at Grande's Vancouver, British Columbia show in April 2015.

=== 2016–present: Dance Kids and Your Face Sounds Familiar ===
In November 2015, Lucky Aces joined ABS-CBN's reality dance competition show Dance Kids. The show ended on February 7, 2016, announcing Lucky Aces as the grand winner, the duo received two million pesos in cash, a house and lot, a family vacation, three hundred thousand pesos worth of shopping spree, and a management contract from Star Magic.

In 2017, Bonifacio participated as one of the performer contestant on ABS-CBN's singing and impersonation competition Your Face Sounds Familiar: Kids, the dancer won two times in the competition, for her impersonations of Rnb singer Usher and Pop singer Janet Jackson. She chose her idol Sarah Geronimo to emulate on the show's grand showdown and performed Sarah Geronimo's 2014 hit Kilometro. The performance later landed as Number 2 on YouTube Philippines trends.

She is now currently working and uploading on her YouTube channel "Andree Bonifacio" every Wednesday at 7:00 pm. As of 2021, she has over 700,000 subscribers and has received her Silver Play Button.

Bonifacio applied to join the Global pop group Now United as a member to represent the Philippines, but would not make the final cut. She would later cameo in Now United's music video for "Afraid of Letting Go", which was shot in Intramuros.

In 2019, Bonifacio became one of the hosts of World of Dance Philippines' online show, which is also hosted by Riva Quenery and Maymay Entrata.

In 2024, Bonifacio made her musical theater debut in the Philippine adaptation of The 25th Annual Putnam County Spelling Bee, alternating the role of Marcy Park with Shanaia Gomez. The Sandbox Collective, a Manila-based theater company, staged the "quirky" musical about teenagers competing in a spelling bee from February 24 to March 17. It was directed by Missy Maramara and produced in collaboration with ABS-CBN, Star Magic, and Teatro Kapamilya. Spelling Bee received highly favorable reviews. Gabriel Bohol of Tatler Asia lauded the production's "impeccable" cast, describing them as "nothing short of perfect".

Bonifacio, in particular, garnered critical acclaim for her performance as Park. In a review of the musical, Marco Sumayao of Adobo Magazine wrote, "AC Bonifacio also establishes herself as a name to watch out for; her Marcy has a slow start due to the impatience written in her script, but AC pulls out all the stops when it comes to 'I Speak Six Languages,' showing that she is every bit the multi-hyphenate performer that her character is. Her do-it-all prowess shows she has massive potential in theater and, given the right tools to grow, she'll have a long, impactful career onstage." Paul John Caña of Esquire Philippines named her as one of Spelling Bee's standout actors, along with Angela Ken and Luis Marcelo. He praised the three for "imbuing their characters with just enough nuance so they don't descend into stereotypes." Likewise, Nikki Francisco of Theater Fans Manila lauded Bonifacio for "impressively" showcasing her "triple threat talents" in Spelling Bee.

== Personal life ==
Bonifacio is dating Filipino actor Harvey Bautista.

== Filmography ==
=== Film ===
Year	Title	Role
2014	Step Up: All In	Dancer
2022	Lyric and Beat Movie Cut	Cadence
2023	Shake, Rattle & Roll Extreme	Ashley
2025	The Four Bad Boys and Me	Tiffany Chua

=== Television series ===
Year	Show	Role	Ref.
2017	Wansapanataym: Amazing Ving	Mika	
2018	Maalaala Mo Kaya: Laptop	young Angelica	
2018	Alamat ng Ano	Isabel	
2018	Playhouse	Cindy Baluyot	
2020	Almost Paradise	Teenage Kai	
2021	Riverdale	Star Vixen	
2022	Lyric and Beat	Cadence	
2024	High Street	Monica "Nikki" Romero / Monica G. Castrodes / Daisy Laygo	
2025	Lolong	Charm	
2025	Roja	Jules Santos	
2026	The Secrets of Hotel 88	Tracey	
2026	Sun Chaser	Zoe (voice)	
2026	Born to Shine	Kendall Domingo	

=== Variety/Reality Shows ===
Year	Show	Notes	Ref.
2015	The Ellen DeGeneres Show	Guest	
2015–16	Dance Kids	Contestant	
2017–present	ASAP	Performer	
2017	Your Face Sounds Familiar Kids (season 1)	Contestant	
2017	Gandang Gabi Vice	Guest with YFSF Kids	
2017	Little Big Shots	Guest	
2021–present	It's Showtime	Guest Judge / Performer	
2025	Pinoy Big Brother: Celebrity Collab Edition	Housemate	

=== Theater ===
Year	Title	Role	Ref.
2024	The 25th Annual Putnam County Spelling Bee	Marcy Park	

== Discography ==
=== Singles ===
- Sumayaw, Sumaya (2018)
- Touch and Move (2018)
- Get Me (2018)
- Slide into my DM (2019)
- In and Out (with Lavaado, 2019)
- Fool No Mo! (2021)
- 4 Myself (2023)

== See also ==
- List of dancers
