= Love at First Spike =

Philippine sports romantic comedy streaming television series

- Promotional poster
- Genre: Coming-of-age; Sports drama; Romantic comedy
- Written by: Ivan Andrew Payawal; Ash Malanum; Keavy Eunice Vicente
- Directed by: Ivan Andrew Payawal
- Starring: Emilio Daez; Reign Parani; Sean Tristan; River Joseph
- Country of origin: Philippines
- Original languages: Filipino; English
- No. of episodes: 8

Production
- Camera setup: Single-camera
- Running time: 45–109 minutes
- Production company: ABS-CBN Studios

Original release
- Network: iWantTFC
- Release: June 20 – July 11, 2025
- Network: iWant
- Release: July 11 – August 8, 2025

Love at First Spike is a Philippine sports romantic comedy television series directed by Ivan Andrew Payawal. It stars Emilio Daez, Reign Parani, Sean Tristan, and River Joseph. The series premiered on June 20, 2025 on iWantTFC.

The series has been nominated for Best Kids: Live Action at the 54th International Emmy Awards, becoming the first iWant original series to be nominated.

== Synopsis ==
A former basketball team captain finds himself in a difficult situation when he is compelled to join the school's boys' volleyball varsity team, known for its queer members.

== Cast and characters ==
=== Main ===
- Emilio Daez as Uno Santillan, the former captain of Brixton High's basketball team, who joined the volleyball varsity team to maintain his scholarship.
- Reign Parani as Farrah Salcedo, the outgoing women's volleyball team captain at Brixton High.
- Sean Tristan as Jared Aragon, the team captain of Brixton's men's volleyball team and cousin of Farrah Salcedo.
- River Joseph as Parker Robinson, Uno's former basketball teammate.

=== Supporting ===
- Andi Abaya as Sinag Bartolome
- Rain Celmar as Olivia Alcantara
- Dylan Yturralde as Ethan Villanueva
- Sky Quizon as Lucien Ong
- Jude Hinumdum as Kidlat Gallente
- Lance Reblando as Diamond Hernandez
- Bong Gonzales as Hans Mendejar
- Binsoy Namoca as Rey Vargas
- Universe Ramos as Albert Palma
- Nick Deocampo as RJ Reyes
- Miggy Ruallo as Macky Vargas
- Drei Sugay as Kenneth Lacie
- Gio Alvarez as Coach Larry Dumlao
- Alwyn Uytingco as Coach Noel Valdez
- Luis Alandy as Ato Santillan
- Meryll Soriano as Carmen Nolasco

== Production ==
The series was announced on January 31, 2025, through an announcement video uploaded on April 8, 2025. The cast was revealed at the same event, with Emilio Daez, Reign Parani, Sean Tristan, and River Joseph leading the series.

The series will air on November 30, 2026 Kapamilya Channel, Kapamilya Online Live, All TV 2 A2Z and TV5 as part of the ABS-CBN primetime programming lineup and TV5 TodoMax Primetime.

== Episodes ==
No.	Title	Original release date
1	"Serve & Receive"	June 20, 2025
Uno gets kicked out of Brixton High's basketball varsity team after being involved in a brawl during a game. Desperate to save his athlete scholarship, he tries out for the boys' volleyball team led by his estranged friend Jared.
2	"Save"	June 27, 2025
When the boys' volleyball team faces dissolution, Jared asks his cousin Farrah to help recruit players. Though Uno shows promise, his troubled history with Jared complicates his tryout chances.
3	"Monster Block"	July 4, 2025
A high school athlete's hostility toward a new teammate creates mounting friction with his coach and fellow players, leading to an explosive showdown.
4	"Mine"	July 11, 2025
Coach Larry sets up a team-building activity in hopes of easing the tension with Jared and unifying the group. While unresolved issues hang in the air, Uno finds himself in a dilemma between his team's dispute and a stalled connection with Farrah.
5	"Unforced Error"	July 18, 2025
Uno makes an effort to clear things up between him and Jared as he grows determined to prove himself to be a valuable teammate. Soon, the team engages in a tune-up game where Uno has to overcome his frustrations and insecurities.
6	"Crossing the Line"	July 25, 2025
Uno struggles as he fears missing the upcoming game in light of his ankle injury. Following Farrah's advice, Uno shows his willingness to change and become a friend to every member of his team, especially Jared.
7	"Red Card"	August 1, 2025
Jared fears losing Uno after making a reckless action, while Farrah struggles with the guilt of liking the same person that her cousin likes. At the Athlete’s night, an unforeseen situation causes a fight among the boys' volleyball team.
8	"Match Point"	August 8, 2025
Uno finds himself at a crossroads when he receives an unexpected offer to return to the basketball team. His decision shakes the Brixton High boys' volleyball team as they go on a crucial match against the defending champions, Daneswood High.

== Marketing ==
An official trailer for the show was released on May 8, 2025.

== Release ==
The series was released on iWantTFC on June 20, 2025 consisting of 8 episodes.

== Reception ==
=== Critical response ===
The series generally received positive reviews from media outlets. JE CC of LionhearTV remarked that the series "delivers a refreshing and heartfelt narrative that seamlessly blends youthful exuberance, queer representation, and the high stakes of varsity life." NYLON Manila included the series in its NYLON Manila Picks for June 2025, noting that it "has non-cringe writing, engaging plot points, complex characters, and something important to say."
