= Lou Yanong =

Filipino model and actress (born 1997)

- Born: Lourdes Grace Bundalian Yanong; March 13, 1997 (age 29); Cavite, Philippines
- Education: MINT College
- Occupations: Model; actress
- Years active: 2012–present
- Agent: Star Magic (2021–present)

Lourdes Grace Yanong (born March 13, 1997) is a Filipino model and actress. She began modeling kids' clothing for Barbie as a child, at the age of seven. Following a hiatus, she continued modeling at the age of fifteen, posing for teen magazines, and became a member of the Professional Modeling Association of the Philippines. She joined the reality competition series Pinoy Big Brother: Otso in 2019. She has since modeled for various publications and events, earning a Best of the Year Model nomination at the Mega Fashion Awards in 2024, among other honors. She has also appeared in television programs like The Iron Heart (2022-2023), Incognito (2025) and Roja (2025-2026).

== Early life and education ==
Lourdes Grace B. Yanong was born on March 13, 1997 in Cavite, Philippines. She graduated from MINT College in 2019 with a degree in Entrepreneurial Management.

== Career ==
=== Beginnings ===
Yanong began modeling at the age of seven, mainly kids' apparel for Barbie. After a hiatus, she resumed her modeling endeavors at the age of fifteen, posing for teen magazines. Patty Betita, an established model, also became Yanong's mentor. By 2014, Yanong was a member of the Professional Models Association of the Philippines.

=== 2019-present: Pinoy Big Brother, career expansion ===
In 2019, Yanong joined the reality competition show Pinoy Big Brother: Otso as an adult housemate. Her kisses with fellow adult housemate Andre Brouilette caused controversy. Former housemates Myrtle Sarrosa and Dawn Chang criticized Yanong and Brouilette for the kisses. According to Sarrosa, the two failed to "set a good example" to the viewers, while Chang expressed the opinion that the kisses took place in an "inappropriate" location but were otherwise normal and understandable. Cosmopolitan Philippines' Lily Grace Tabanera identified the backlash as slut-shaming towards Yanong, defending her actions.

In September 2024, Yanong was nominated for Best of the Year Model at the Mega Fashion Awards. In the same month, the magazine further honored her as one of their "Models of the Moment". In October, L'Officiel Philippines recognized her as one of their "Models to Watch Out For" after she walked the BYS Fashion Week runway.

In 2025, Yanong joined the cast of the Filipino action series Roja.

== Personal life ==
In May 2019, Yanong confirmed her relationship with fellow Pinoy Big Brother: Otso contestant Andre Brouillette. They broke up in January 2021. She is currently dating Filipino model Kirk Bondad.

== Filmography ==
=== Film ===
| Year | Title | Role |
|---|---|---|
| 2020 | Still Connected | Bianca |

=== Television ===
| Year | Title | Role |
|---|---|---|
| 2019 | Pinoy Big Brother: Otso | Housemate - Third Big Placer |
| 2022 | Maalaala Mo Kaya: Selda | Vanessa |
| 2022 | Maalaala Mo Kaya: Tablet | Vanessa |
| 2022–2023 | The Iron Heart | Rhea |
| 2025 | Incognito | Kwatro |
| 2025–2026 | Roja | Gwen "Sais" Zaragosa |
| 2026 | Blood vs Duty | Agent Eve Castillo |
| 2026–present | ASAP XP | Co-host / Performer |

=== Music video appearances ===
| Year | Title | Artist | Notes |
|---|---|---|---|
| 2024 | Trash | BGYO | Cameo |
