= Emilio Daez =

Filipino actor and model (born 2000)

- Born: Franco Emilio Banzon Daez; March 9, 2000 (age 26); Manila, Philippines
- Education: Ateneo De Manila University
- Occupations: Actor; social media personality; host
- Years active: 2024–present
- Agent(s): Star Magic; VCM The Celebrity Source
- Height: 5 ft 10 in (1.78 m)
- Relatives: Mikael Daez (brother); Megan Young (sister-in-law)

Franco Emilio Banzon Daez (Tagalog: [ɛmˈɪlɪˌə͡ʊ ˈdaʔes]; born March 9, 2000) is a Filipino actor, host, and social media personality. He is best known for his role in the television drama Pamilya Sagrado. Daez gained further public recognition through his participation in Pinoy Big Brother: Celebrity Collab Edition.

He is currently under the management of Star Magic.

== Early life and education ==
Franco Emilio Banzon Daez was born on March 9, 2000, in Manila, Philippines to a family of nine siblings. He is the younger brother of actor and content creator Mikael Daez.

Daez attended Ateneo de Manila University from grade school to college, earning a degree in Management Engineering. Before his transition to showbiz, Daez worked as an investment banker in the Bank of the Philippine Islands for almost two years.

== Career ==
In 2022, Daez made his first television appearance as a guest on Family Feud Philippines.

In 2024, Daez appeared in the ABS-CBN's game show Rainbow Rumble where he become the second contestant to be "rainbow unlocked" and won the ₱1 million top prize. He was announced as part of the cast of the action drama series Pamilya Sagrado. Portraying Leon Arevalo Jr., the hot-tempered fraternity boy, Daez reflected, "It's been really fun playing a bad boy because I had to step out of my comfort zone." He also had a supporting role in Saving Grace as Wilson Hernandez.

In 2025, Daez was introduced as a housemate in Pinoy Big Brother: Celebrity Collab Edition. He placed 15th in the edition and exited the house alongside his duo partner, Michael Sager. In later episodes, he briefly returned as a house challenger.

In July, Daez starred in his first lead role in the youth-oriented sports series, Love at First Spike. In an interview, he revealed that he was chosen from among 50 other actors who auditioned for the part. To prepare for his role as Uno, he trained with professional athletes, including coaches from the Philippine men's volleyball team and teams in the Premier Volleyball League.

In 2026, Daez was cast among the 20 "lucky stars" in another ABS-CBN's game show Kapamilya Deal or No Deal and selected as the designated contestantwhere he won ₱250,000 for his charity.

== Other ventures ==
=== Business ===
Before entering showbiz, Daez founded SanEm Corporation in January 2021, a supplier of safety footwear to AAA construction firms in the Philippines.

=== Endorsements ===
In July 2025, Daez was introduced as an ambassador for KFC Philippines. According to KFC Philippines General Manager Jojo Marcelo, Daez "represents the modern KFC spirit— kind-hearted, friendly, cool, and charming," and reflects "a distinctly Filipino vibe" that aligns with the company's modernization efforts.

== Personal life ==
Daez describes himself as an extrovert. He expressed that he loves meeting and talking to people in a Metro Artist Spotlight interview.

== Filmography ==
=== Film ===
Emilio Daez's film credits with year of release, film titles and roles
| Year | Title | Role | Notes | Ref. |
|---|---|---|---|---|
| 2025 | Romance Reboot | Enzo | Main role | |
| 2025 | Bar Boys: After School | Ziggy Nicardo | Metro Manila Film Festival entry | |
| 2026 | Tayo sa Wakas | Mookie | Support role | |

=== Television ===
Emilio Daez's television credits with year of release, title(s) and role
| Year | Title | Role | Notes | Ref. |
|---|---|---|---|---|
| 2022 | Family Feud Philippines | Contestant | Season 1, Episode 6 | |
| 2024 | Pamilya Sagrado | Leon Arevalo Jr. | Recurring Role | |
| 2024 | Rainbow Rumble | Contestant | Rainbow Rumble Master | |
| 2024 | iWant ASAP | Main Host | Online show | |
| 2024–2025 | Saving Grace | Wilson Hernandez | Supporting role | |
| 2025 | Pinoy Big Brother: Celebrity Collab Edition | Housemate | Regular housemate (Day 22); evicted on Day 49 | |
| 2025 | Love at First Spike | Uno Santillan | Main role | |
| 2025 | Idol Kids Philippines | Host | Online companion show | |
| 2025 | It's Showtime | Guest | Performer | |
| 2025–2026 | Roja | Bogs Lim | Supporting role | |
| 2026 | The Secrets of Hotel 88 | Juan Soliman | Supporting role | |
| 2026 | Blood vs Duty | PO3 Mark Vinluan | Supporting role | |
| 2026 | Kapamilya Deal or No Deal | Himself/Briefcase No. 3 | Season 6, Episode 42 | |

=== Music videos ===
| Year | Title | Artist | Ref. |
|---|---|---|---|
| 2024 | "Kung Naging Tayo" | Alexa Ilacad | |

== Awards and nominations ==
| Award | Year | Category | Nominated work | Result | Ref. |
|---|---|---|---|---|---|
| PMPC Star Awards for Movies | 2026 | New Movie Actor of the Year | Bar Boys: After School | Nominated | |
