= Harvey Bautista =

Filipino actor (born 2003)

- Born: Harvey Terrence Enfemo Bautista; August 16, 2003 (age 22); Quezon City, Philippines
- Occupation: Actor
- Years active: 2011–present
- Agent: Star Magic (2011–present)
- Height: 5 ft 8 in (173 cm)
- Parent(s): Herbert Bautista (father); Agnes Gana (mother)

Harvey Terrence Enfemo Bautista (born August 16, 2003) is a Filipino actor and television personality. He started his career as a child actor on the ABS-CBN children's sketch comedy show Goin’ Bulilit (2011–2016). He is known for his roles in the indie film Ilawod (2017), Blue Room (2022), Zoomers (2024), and the mystery-thriller television series High Street (2024).

== Early life ==
Harvey Terrence Enfemo Bautista was born on August 16, 2003, in Quezon City, Philippines.

He began his career in show business at the age of eight when he joined ABS-CBN's children's gag show Goin’ Bulilit in 2011. He is the son of former Quezon City Mayor Herbert Bautista.

== Personal life ==
He is dating Filipino-Canadian actress, dancer, and singer AC Bonifacio.

== Filmography ==
Key
†	Denotes films or TV productions that have not yet been released

=== Film ===
Year	Title	Role	Notes	Ref.
2017	Ilawod	Ben		
2017	Nay	Young Martin	Cinema One Originals Digital Film Festival entry	
2022	Blue Room	Chigz Montero	18th Cinemalaya Independent Film Festival entry	
2024	Pushcart Tales	Ryan/Queer	Puregold CinePanalo Film Festival entry	
2024	Friendly Fire	Ryan	Hawaiʻi International Film Festival entry	
2025	The Four Bad Boys and Me	Marky Lim	Web film	

=== Television ===
Year	Title	Role	Notes	Ref.
2011–2016	Goin' Bulilit	Himself		
2012	Wansapanataym: The Perfect Gift	Tofi	Episode 111	
2013	It's Showtime	Himself/Guest Performer		
2014	Hawak Kamay	Alfonzo		
2014	Maalaala Mo Kaya: Santan	Janjan	Episode 996	
2015	Doble Kara	Young Andy		
2015	Maalaala Mo Kaya: Hat	Young Tarik		
2015	It's Showtime: Holy Week Special	Ric Cadavero		
2015	Wansapanataym: Remote ni Eric	Eric Gutierrez	Episode 231–235	
2016	Wansapanataym: That's My Toy, That's My Boy	Topher Tabora	Episode 284–289	
2016	Maalaala Mo Kaya: Boxing Ring	Young Glenn	Episode 1104	
2016	Wansapanataym: Santi Cruz is Coming to Town	Young Santi	Episode 320–322	
2017	Maalaala Mo Kaya: Autograph	JC Padilla	Episode 1142	
2018–2019	Halik	Choi		
2020	Love Thy Woman	Young Harry		
2021	Niña Niño	Marius		
2024	Pamilya Sagrado	Percy de Leon		
2024	High Street	Wesley Mata / Mark Joseph Wesley G. Castrodes		
2024	Zoomers	Jiggs		
2025–2026	Roja	Ian "Cuatro" Menor		
2026	Drug War: A Conspiracy of Silence †	TBA	Post-production	

== Accolades ==
Awards and NominationsAwards and nominations received by Harvey Bautista
Award	Year	Category	Nominated work	Result	Ref.
CinePanalo Film Festival	2024	Best Actor (Panalong Aktor)	Pushcart Tales	Nominated	
CinePanalo Film Festival	2024	Best Ensemble (Panalong Ensemble)	Pushcart Tales	Won	
The EDDYS	2023	Best Original Theme Song (shared with Jeng Plata, Michael Angelo Dagñalan, Elijah Canlas, Keoni Jin, Nour Hooshmand, Juan Karlos Labajo)	Blue Room ("Unang araw ng pag-iisa")	Nominated	
PMPC Star Awards for Movies	2024	Movie Supporting Actor of the Year	Blue Room	Nominated	
PMPC Star Awards for Movies	2024	Indie Movie Ensemble Acting of the Year	Blue Room	Nominated	
PMPC Star Awards for Movies	2024	Indie Movie Theme Song of the Year (shared with Elijah Canlas, Nour Hooshmand, Juan Karlos Labajo, Keoni Jin)	Blue Room (""Bayan ko")	Nominated	
PMPC Star Awards for Movies	2025	Movie Supporting Actor of the Year	Pushcart Tales	Won	
PMPC Star Awards for Movies	2025	Indie Movie Ensemble Acting of the Year	Pushcart Tales	Nominated	
PMPC Star Awards for Television	2012	Best New Male TV Personality	Goin' Bulilit	Nominated	
PMPC Star Awards for Television	2014	Best Comedy Actor	Goin' Bulilit	Nominated	
PMPC Star Awards for Television	2015	Best Child Performer	Wansapanataym: Remote ni Eric	Won	
