= River Joseph =

Filipino actor

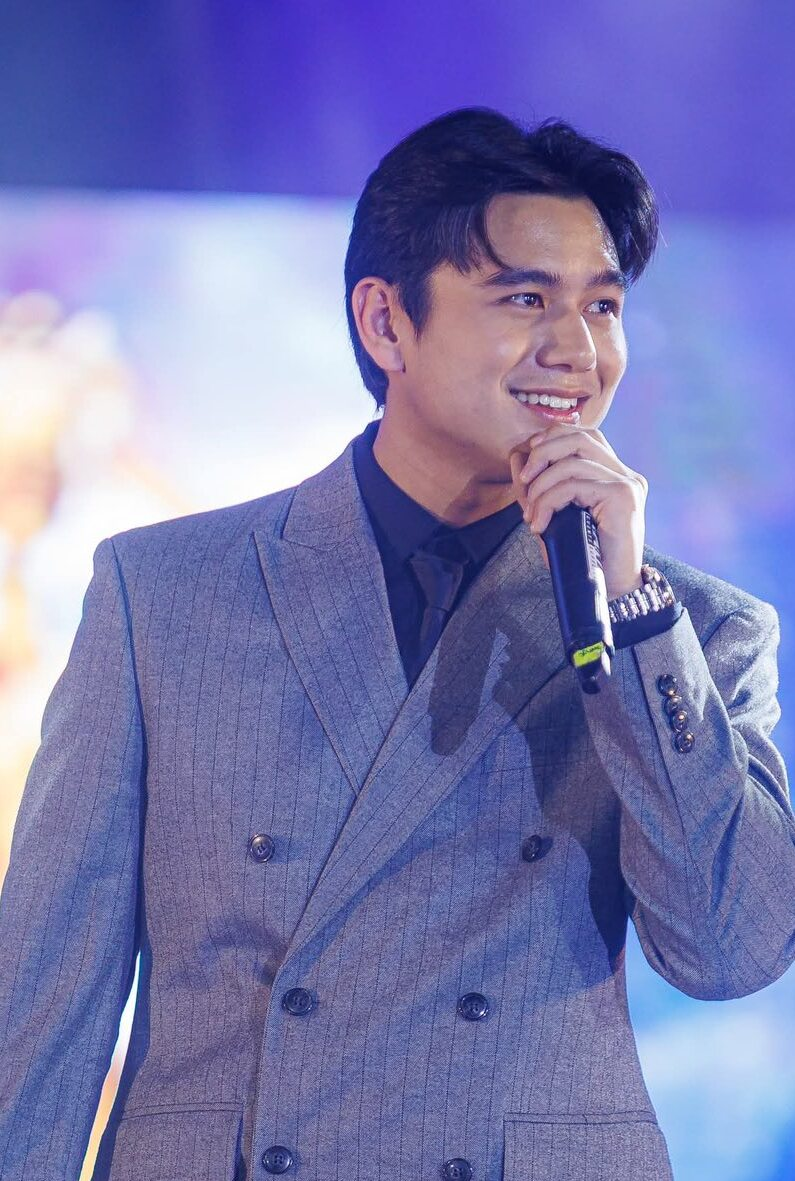
- Joseph at the Miss Bicolandia pageant in September 2025
- Born: River Iye Manalo Joseph; Muntinlupa, Metro Manila, Philippines
- Occupations: Actor; model; entrepreneur
- Years active: 2022–present
- Agents: Star Magic; Rise Artists Studio
- Known for: Pamilya Sagrado (2024); Pinoy Big Brother: Celebrity Collab Edition (2025)

River Iye Manalo Joseph is a Filipino actor, model and entrepreneur. He is best known for his roles in the television series He's Into Her, The Iron Heart, Pamilya Sagrado, and Pinoy Big Brother: Celebrity Collab Edition.

== Early life and education ==
River Iye Manalo Joseph was born in Muntinlupa to a family of entrepreneurs. His father, Robert Lim Joseph, died of cancer in 2022. His mother, Ida Manalo Joseph, is the sister of SM Retail president Chito Manalo. Through his father, Joseph is of Chinese, Iraqi, and Syrian descent. He finished his secondary education at De La Salle Santiago Zobel School and attended De La Salle University for college, where he was active in student politics, being an active member of the political party, Alyansang Tapat sa Lasallista. He earned a degree in Business Management in 2023.

== Career ==
Joseph began his career as a commercial model. During the COVID-19 pandemic, his TikTok videos gained attention, leading his manager to encourage him to audition for Rise Artists Studio, a talent management division of Star Magic. He made his acting debut in 2022 as part of the cast of He's Into Her Season 2.

Following his debut, Joseph had a role in the action-drama series The Iron Heart and later appeared in the romantic drama Unbreak My Heart. In 2024, he took on the role of Steven Hermoso in the family drama Pamilya Sagrado, joining Kyle Echarri, Grae Fernandez, and Piolo Pascual. Reflecting on his role, Joseph shared that delivering his Tagalog lines was challenging because English was his first language and he grew up speaking it with his friends. He described the transition to speaking Tagalog on screen as an adjustment that he continues to work on.

In 2025, Joseph was revealed as one of the housemates for Pinoy Big Brother: Celebrity Collab Edition, where he gained wider public recognition. He was introduced with the moniker, "Sporty Business Bro ng Muntinlupa City," and finished as the season's fourth Big Placer alongside his duo partner, AZ Martinez. In July, Joseph portrayed Parker Robinson, the antagonist in the sports series, Love at First Spike. He also starred in the Wattpad digital film adaptation of The Four Bad Boys and Me as Charles Gonzales. Joseph described Charles as very different from himself, noting that the character was hotheaded, prone to trouble, and spoke mostly in Tagalog. “Through the help of Direk, the writers, they really helped me build the character of Charles. […] I hope I was able to give justice to Charles […].”

== Media presence ==
In 2021, Joseph was featured in an exclusive interview with Garage PH, where he discussed his burgeoning showbiz career, business ventures, personal style, and upcoming projects. He was also featured in Metro.style in 2022 alongside the cast of He’s Into Her, where he discussed his career breakthrough through his portrayal of the character Jaybee.

In 2023, Joseph was named one of Mega Magazine's "5 Online Filipino Boyfriends of TikTok." Later that year, he was also featured in the anniversary issue for PARCINQ Super Fresh, where he discussed his transition from being a TV commercial actor to a full-fledged presence in show business.

In 2025, Joseph was featured in Metro Magazine alongside his fellow PBB Big Four placers. He was also featured in a Metro exclusive article titled "River Joseph Sets the Standard as the PBB 'Green Flag'", which reflected on his time as a housemate on the reality television show.

== Other ventures ==
=== Business ===
Apart from acting, Joseph is also an entrepreneur. He started a business called CASSA, offering eco-friendly plastic bags made from cassava starch.

=== Philanthropy ===
Joseph is involved with the Rich for the Poor, an outreach initiative aimed at assisting street children and other underprivileged groups. In an interview, he explained, "Rich for the Poor is a foundation dedicated to my brother, Richard, who passed away in 2017. He had a passion for helping and feeding street children and we wanted to continue his legacy through this foundation."

In 2025, during his appearance on PBB, Joseph and his duo partner Martinez won a charity task that awarded ₱100,000 to be donated to their chosen beneficiary. They selected the Cancer Treatment and Support Foundation Inc. as the recipient, dedicating the donation to their late fathers.

== Personal life ==
Joseph has expressed an interest in sports. He played basketball during his high school years and participated in the annual Star Magic All-Star Games. He also enjoys playing golf in his free time.

He is currently in a relationship with fellow Star Magic talent Gela Alonte.

== Filmography ==
Key
†	Denotes productions that have not yet been released

=== Film ===
Year	Title	Role	Ref.
2023	Toss Coin	Pia's Ex Boyfriend	
2025	The Four Bad Boys and Me	Charles Gonzales	
2025	Call Me Mother	Anton Villaverde	
2026	Tayo sa Wakas	Shane	
2026	Stuck on You	Max De Dios	

=== Television ===
Year	Title	Role	Ref.
2022	He's Into Her - Season 2	John Benjamin "JB" Jose	
2023	The Iron Heart	Carl	
2023	Teen Clash	Unknown	
2023	Unbreak My Heart	Unknown	
2024	Pamilya Sagrado	Stevenson "Steven" Hermoso	
2025	Pinoy Big Brother: Celebrity Collab Edition	Housemate / Kapamilya Fourth Big Placer	
2025	It's Showtime	Guest Performer	
2025	Love At First Spike	Parker Robinson	
2025	Rainbow Rumble	Contestant	
2025	Sins of the Father	Rainier	
2026	Pinoy Big Brother: Celebrity Collab Edition 2.0	Houseguest	
2026	The Secrets of Hotel 88	Leon Almazan	
2026	Blood vs Duty	Agent Andre Flores	

=== Microdrama ===
Year	Title	Role
2026	Dead Girl Walking	Elio De Vera
	Blood Moon	Donny

=== Music video appearance ===
Year	Song	Artist
2022	"Awake"	Shanaia Gomez
