= Reign Parani =

Filipino actress, model

- Born: Atasha Reign Poblete Parani; November 23, 2003 (age 22); Winnipeg, Canada
- Occupations: Actress; model; singer
- Years active: 2018–present
- Agent: Star Magic (2021–present)

Atasha Reign Poblete Parani is a filipina actress, model and singer known as housemate in Pinoy Big Brother Season 8.

Parani is best known as housemate in the teen edition of Pinoy Big Brother Season 8. Parani is also an actress and one of the main cast in a Filipino series, Love at First Spike portraying the character of Farrah Salcedo. Aside from being an actress, Parani is also a model and beauty queen who joined Binibining Pilipinas 2023 where she placed as second runner-up.
