= Carlo L. Katigbak =

President and CEO of ABS-CBN Corporation, and Executive Producer of ABS-CBN Studios

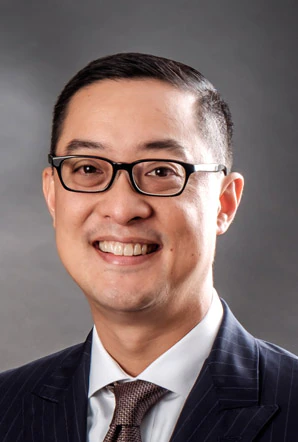
- Katigbak in 2017

President & CEO of ABS-CBN (Broadcasting) Corporation
- Incumbent
- Assumed office January 1, 2016
- Preceded by: Charo Santos-Concio

Personal details
- Born: Carlo Joaquin Tadeo López Katigbak; April 24, 1970 (age 56) Philippines
- Spouse: Charisse Katigbak
- Children: 6
- Parents: Nicolas Katigbak; Lourdes López
- Education: Ateneo de Manila University
- Occupation: President and CEO, ABS-CBN Corporation; Executive Producer, ABS-CBN Studios
- Nickname: CLK

Carlo Joaquin Tadeo López Katigbak (born April 24, 1970) is a Filipino media executive who is the current president and CEO of the Philippine media company ABS-CBN Corporation and also one of the two executive producers of the company's production and distribution division ABS-CBN Studios together with Chief Operating Officer and Board Member Cory Vidanes.

== Education ==
Katigbak attended Ateneo de Manila University, where he graduated with a Bachelor of Science in management engineering degree in 1991. He later completed Harvard Business School's Advanced Management Program in 2009.

== Career ==
Katigbak commenced his career as a financial analyst for First Pacific Capital Corporation in 1992. He joined ABS-CBN Corporation through Sky Cable in 1994. He served as Corporate Finance Manager and has held various positions in Corporate Planning, Provincial Operations and Finance at Sky Cable. He was responsible for establishing the presence of the company's services outside Metro Manila since the company's TV operation was predominantly in the metropolis. Katigbak helped Sky Cable establish presence in key cities around the Philippines. He was appointed as first managing director of the Pilipino Cable Corporation in 1998.

In 1999, Katigbak moved to ABS-CBN where he was tasked to build an online business which led to the establishment of a company named ABS-CBN Interactive. For six years served as the managing director of ABS-CBN Interactive Inc., which created and managed websites of ABS-CBN and its subsidiaries. From 2005 to 2011, Katigbak served as chief operating officer of Sky Cable.

He was named president of Sky Cable in 2013. During his tenure the company released the Digibox and reintroduced Sky Cable's broadband products, He is also the managing director of Bayan Holdings Corporation. Katigbak served as the head of ABS-CBN Access group, where he oversaw the strategy formulation and performance of Sky Cable Corporation, ABS-CBNmobile, and ABS-CBN TV Plus. He was appointed as chief operating officer of ABS-CBN on March 1, 2015.

On December 18, 2015, ABS-CBN Corporation announced that Katigbak would be the new president and CEO of the company and its production and distribution division ABS-CBN Studios starting on January 1, 2016, replacing Charo Santos-Concio, who would retire from the position.

== Personal life ==
Katigbak is married to Charisse, whom he met in his job at Sky Cable. He pursued her when she quit after a year of working with the company. He and his wife have six children.

Business positions
Preceded by Charo Santos-Concio	ABS-CBN President and CEO; 2016 – present	Incumbent
