= Cory Vidanes =

Filipina media executive (born 1962)

- Born: María Socorro Valenzuela; May 15, 1962 (age 64); Metro Manila, Philippines
- Other name: CVV
- Education: Ateneo de Manila University
- Occupations: Chief Operating Officer and Board Member of ABS-CBN (Broadcasting) Corporation; Executive Producer of ABS-CBN Studios
- Years active: 1982–present
- Spouse: Bobet Vidanes
- Children: Ara Vidanes; Kobi Vidanes; Chad Vidanes

María Socorro Valenzuela-Vidanes, popularly known as Cory Vidanes (born May 15, 1962), is a Filipina media executive who is the Chief Operating Officer and Board Member of the Philippine media company ABS-CBN Corporation and also one of the two executive producers of the company's production and distribution division ABS-CBN Studios together with president and CEO Carlo Katigbak.

== Personal life ==
Vidanes first attended Assumption Antipolo and later Ateneo de Manila University, where she obtained her Bachelor of Arts degree in communications.

Vidanes was married to Bobet Vidanes, a Filipino television director. They have three children, Ara, Kobi, and Chad.

== Career ==
In 1982, Vidanes started her broadcast career for the Banahaw Broadcasting Corporation (BBC-2) as a production assistant for the shows Big Ike's Happening and Vilma in Person (VIP). She started working with ABS-CBN when the network reopened in 1986 as an associate producer. She also served as a managing director for ABS-CBN TV productions from 2001 to 2009. She was responsible for the conceptualization, production and management of all TV entertainment programs on ABS-CBN Channel 2. She was appointed Head of Channel 2 Mega Manila Management for ABS-CBN effective 2009 after Charo Santos-Concio was promoted to president and COO of the company.

Vidanes was appointed as chief operating officer for broadcast of ABS-CBN effective February 1, 2016. This happened one month after the appointment of Carlo Katigbak as the company's new president and CEO.

Under her position as COO of Broadcast, she also manages the development of new concepts for ABS-CBN Channel 2 and ABS-CBN TVplus channels Yey, CineMo and Knowledge Channel, together with ABS-CBN CCO Charo Santos-Concio. Vidanes is also the executive producers of ABS-CBN Studios together with Carlo Katigbak.

On September 9, 2026, Vidanes joined the ABS-CBN board of directors, expanding the member's count from 7 to 9.
