= Vivoree Esclito videography =

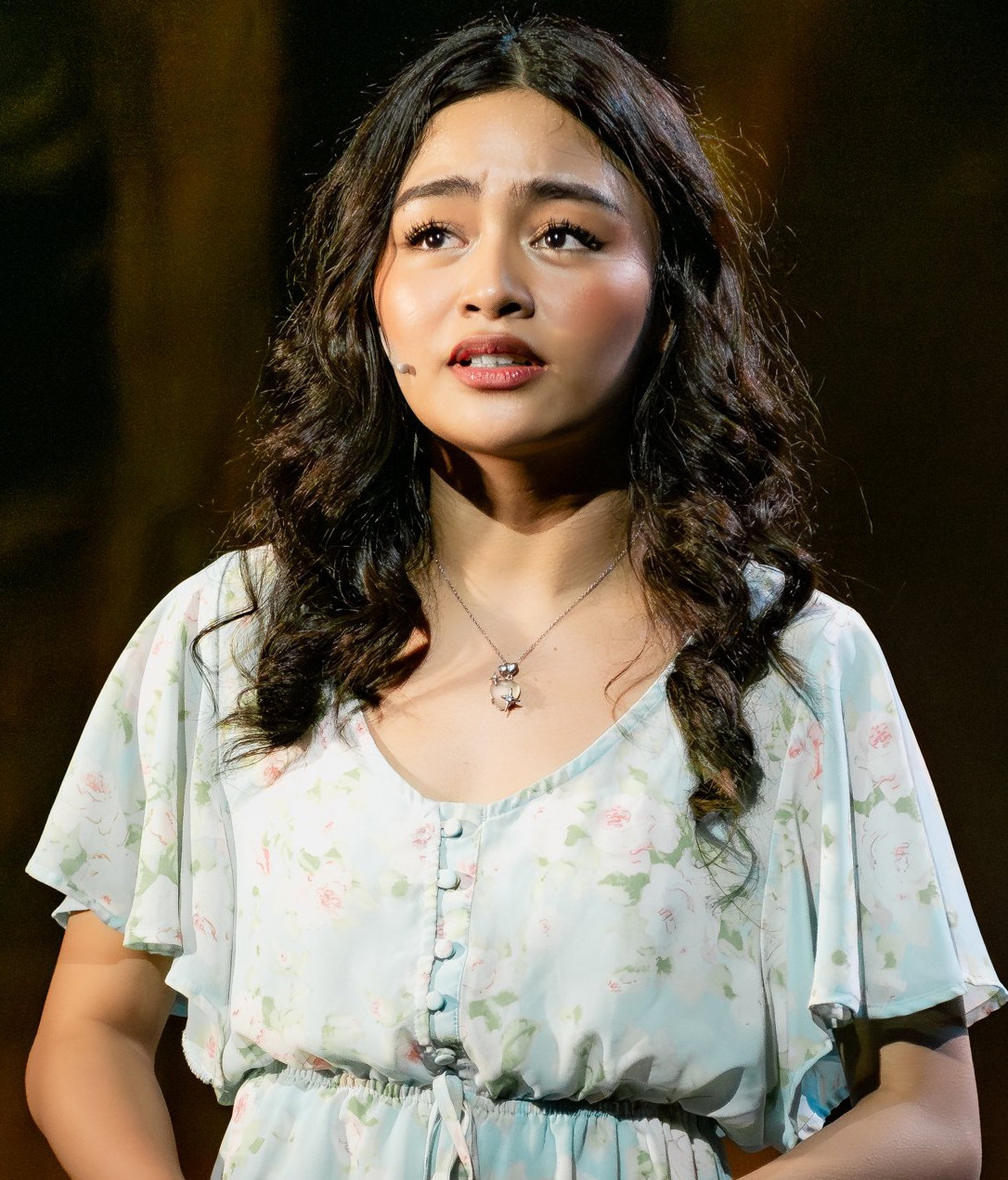
- Esclito in Tabing Ilog the Musical
- Film: 5
- Television series: 36
- Web series: 12
- Documentary: 3
- Music videos: 9
- Theatre: 2

The Filipino actress, singer, and model Vivoree Esclito has appeared in nine music videos, five films, 36 television shows, 12 online/digital shows, two theater plays, and three documentaries.

== Online/Digital ==
Year	Title	Role	Ref.
2020	Hello Stranger	Kookai Yambao	
2020	Stay at Home Stories: Mag-isa	Mags	
2021	12 Stories of Christmas	Herself	
2022	SineTula	Narrator	
2022	Star Magic Hot Summer	Herself	
2022	Love Bites: Lost But Found	Aina	
2022	Bench Fashion Week	Red Carpet host	
2023	Rise With You	Herself	
2023	BardaguLounge	Herself	
2023–2024	Star Magic All-Star Games	Herself	
2024	CBML All Access		

== Film ==
Year	Title	Role	Ref.
2018	Otlum	Girl Recruit	
2018	Petmalu	Liza	
2021	Hello Stranger: The Movie	Kookai Yambao	
2023	In His Mother's Eyes	Zuri	
2025	One Hit Wonder	Jocelyn	

== Television ==
Year	Title	Role	Ref.
2016	Pinoy Big Brother: Lucky 7	Herself/Housemate	
2016; 2018–2019	Tonight with Boy Abunda	Herself (4 episodes)	
2016; 2018–2019	ASAP Chillout	Herself (8 episodes excluding BTS/interviews)	
2016; 2018–2022	Magandang Buhay	Herself (7 episodes)	
2017	Ipaglaban Mo: Kulam	Jill	
2017	Maalaala Mo Kaya: Love Team	Cherry	
2017	Family Feud	Herself/Guest Player	
2017	Matanglawin	Herself/Guest	
2017; 2019	Minute to Win It: Last Man Standing	Player (6 episodes)	
2017–present	ASAP	Herself/Performer	
2018	Wansapanataym: ManiKEN ni Monica	Monica	
2018	Maalaala Mo Kaya: Bawang	Faye	
2018	Ipaglaban Mo: Gapang	Gina	
2018	Since I Found You	AJ Punzalan	
2018	Asintado	Charie Tamayo	
2018	Rated Korina	Guest	
2018–2020	Umagang Kay Ganda	Herself (7 episodes excluding news features)	
2019	Maalaala Mo Kaya: Choir	Jenny	
2019	The Killer Bride	Mildred Dimalanta	
2019	Matanglawin	Herself/Guest	
2019	Banana Sundae	Herself	
2019	Gandang Gabi, Vice!	Guest	
2019	Pop MYX	Celebrity VJ	
2020	Maalaala Mo Kaya: Ilog	young Elvira	
2021	Huwag Kang Mangamba	Freya Salvador	
2021	Pinoy Big Brother: Connect: The Big Night	Herself/Performer	
2021	He's Into Her	Melissa "Ysay" Baylon	
2021	It's Showtime: Hide and Sing	Herself/Performer	
2021	Your Face Sounds Familiar: Season 3	Herself/Performer	
2021–2022	We Rise Together	Co-host	
2022	Click, Like, Share: QR Code	Ellie Ramos	
2022	He's Into Her Season 2	Melissa "Ysay" Baylon	
2022	I Can See Your Voice (season 4)	Guest artist	
2022	Pie Night Long	Guest Host	
2022	PIE Night Long: PNL Sessions	Host	
2022	Tara, G!	Jennylyn "Jengjeng" Antonio	
2022	ABS-CBN Christmas Special 2022	Herself	
2022–2023	Pak! Palong Follow	Host	
2022–2023	The Iron Heart	Penelope Sta. Maria	
2023–2024	Can’t Buy Me Love	Pandora "Dara" dela Cruz	
2024	Kuan on One	Herself	
2025	It's Showtime	Herself/Guest Player	
2025	Ghosting	Emma	
2025	Your Face Sounds Familiar season 4	Online host	
2025	Shadow CEO	Lea Ramos	

== Documentaries ==
Year	Title	Role	Ref.
2019	Myxed Lives: A Day In The Life of Vivoree Esclito	Herself	
2021	He's Into Her: The Journey	Herself	
2022	All Time HIH: The Road to He's Into Her Season 2	Herself	

== Music videos ==
Year	Title	Artist	Remarks	Ref.
2019	Laro	CK & Vivoree		
2019	I am Beautiful	Regine Velasquez		
2020	Hawak Kamay feat. Star Magic Family	Bea Alonzo, Piolo Pascual, Sam Milby, KZ Tandingan, Erik Santos, Klarisse De Guzman, Jona, Vivoree, Sue Ramirez, Elmo Magalona, AC Bonifacio, Nyoy Volante and Yeng Constantino		
2022	Did I let You Go	Jon Guelas and Vivoree	Part of He's Into Her OST	
2022	Tara G	The Juans		
2023	Matapang	Vivoree	with Brent Manalo	
2023	Dalawang Isip	Vivoree	with Brent Manalo	
2023	Sayaw ng mga Tala	Vivoree & Benedix Ramos	with Benedix Ramos and Brent Manalo	
2024	Movie Made For Me	Vivoree		

== Theater ==
Year	Title	Role	Production	Ref.
2023–2024	Tabing Ilog the Musical	Eds Delos Santos	PETA; Star Magic	
2024	Unang Aswang		PETA Workshops	
