= Halfmates =

Philippine streaming television miniseries

- Genre: Romantic comedy
- Created by: Arah Jell Badayos
- Written by: Chie Floresca; Akeem del Rosario
- Directed by: Raz de la Torre
- Starring: Kaori Oinuma; Jeremiah Lisbo; Karina Bautista
- Opening theme: "Biglaan" by Belle Mariano
- Composer: Trisha Denise
- Country of origin: Philippines
- Original language: Filipino
- No. of episodes: 13

Production
- Executive producers: Carlo Katigbak; Cory Vidanes; Laurenti Dyogi; Jamie Lopez
- Production company: RCD Narratives

Original release
- Network: YouTube
- Release: October 18 – November 29, 2024

Halfmates is a Philippine romantic comedy web series directed by Raz de la Torre. This series top-billed by Kaori Oinuma and Jeremiah Lisbo, premiered on October 18, 2024, on ABS-CBN Entertainment YouTube channel.

== Premise ==
Dani who is a former OFW, and James an introvert guy, have their lives intertwined after finding out that they were scammed in a double sale of their dream house.

== Cast and characters ==
=== Main cast ===
- Kaori Oinuma as Daniela "Dani" Del Rosario - a young and sunny former OFW working as a nurse in New Zealand. She is also a streamer and content creator.
- Jeremiah Lisbo as James Florendo - a workaholic Accountant, an introvert and structured guy.
- Karina Bautista as Joane, James officemate and girlfriend

=== Supporting cast. ===
- Peewee O'Hara as mama Siony, Dani's grandmother
- Archie Adamos as Dani's father
- Marnie Lapus as Dani's mother
- Pamu Pamorada as Dani's older sister
- Mimi Orara as Nay Hara Kupitan, the one who sold the house to Dani and wife of Bebong.
- Raul Montessa as Robert "Bebong" Kupitan, James' client and the one who sold him the house.
- Batit Espiritu as son of Hara and Bebong Kupitan
- Markus Paterson as Gary Salcedo

=== Cameo/Guest cast ===
- Karenina Sual as Dani's colleague/ fellow nurse in Auckland Pediatrics (ep.1)
- Regine Roda as waitress in Dani's snack bar (eps. 6, 8 and 13)
- William Morano Jr. as passerby (ep. 5)
- Art Hermida as passerby (ep. 5)

== Episodes ==
No.	Title	Original air date (Note: iWant shows two episodes first in advance before it broadcasts on TV while Netflix shows three episodes in advance.)
1	"Scammed"	October 18, 2024
Dani and James, two strangers with very different personalities, move into the same house and quickly discover they've been scammed.
2	"Double Sale"	October 22, 2025
Dani and James agree to share the house until they can find the couple who scammed them and settle the matter.
3	"House Rules"	October 25, 2025
Dani agrees to live with James, but things get tense when she decides to put up a snack bar in the garden.
4	"It's Complicated!"	October 29, 2025
Dani's family visits, creating awkwardness as Dani convinces them that James is just her snack bar manager.
5	"Road Trip"	November 5, 2025
Dani and James attempt to find the couple who scammed them but end up bonding over a series of unfortunate events.
6	"Out of the Bag"	November 5, 2025
Joane confronts James about living with Dani. Meanwhile, Dani focuses on launching her new snack bar despite the drama.
7	"Making Up"	November 8, 2025
Dani and James are forced to keep up pretenses when Mama Siony drops by unannounced. Later, Mama Siony reveals that she knows their secret and asks them if they've given much thought to what happens when their situation is resolved.
8	"A New Housemate"	November 15, 2025
Joane moves in, causing tension among the housemates.
9	"Realizations"	November 19, 2025
Dani is forced to confront her feelings for James and realizes she must ignore them so James and Joane can fix their relationship.
10	"New House Rules"	November 19, 2025
Dani stays away from James and Joane as they work on their relationship. However, she ends up witnessing Joane kissing another guy.
11	"Unpacking Feelings"	November 22, 2025
When James returns to find Joane gone, Dani and James must deal with the third buyer claiming the house while also confronting their feelings for each other.
12	"NGL, Falling 4 U"	November 25, 2025
James breaks up with Joane. As he prepares to leave the house for good, Dani wrestles with her feelings for James.
13	"Housemates No More"	February 5, 2025
As Dani struggles with her feelings for James, he surprises her at the snack bar, revealing his real feelings for her.
