= Melizza Jimenez =

Filipino actress and singer

- Born: Melizza Jaune Rivera Tanpoco; Manila, Philippines
- Education: Queensland University of Technology
- Occupations: Actress; Singer; Songwriter; Content Creator; Business Owner
- Years active: 2016–present
- Agent: Star Magic (2016–present)
- Relatives: Maika Rivera (sister)
- Musical career
- Genres: OPM; Indie Pop
- Years active: 2020–present
- Label: Warner Music Philippines (2021–present)

Melizza Jaune Rivera Tanpoco, better known as Melizza Jimenez, is a Filipino actress, singer, songwriter, content creator, and business owner. She is mostly known for playing Elle in the first season of He's Into Her, Michelle in Gen Z, and Macky in Barcelona: A Love Untold.

== Career ==
=== 2015–2019: Career Beginnings, Star Magic Circle, and The Killer Bride ===
In 2015, Jimenez tried her luck to audition for Pinoy Big Brother with her real-life sister, Filipino tennis player, model and actress Maika Rivera. Unfortunately, she didn't pass the show's final audition, but she was advised by the ABS-CBN producers to try out for Star Magic Circle, and became an artist trainee of Star Magic since then.

In 2016, Jimenez made her acting debut as she took on the role of Macky Dela Torre in the romance-drama film Barcelona: A Love Untold directed by Olivia Lamasan, starring Kathryn Bernardo and Daniel Padilla. She has also taken roles in Wansapanataym: Tikboyong as Wendy and in FPJ's Ang Probinsyano as Sally.

In 2019, Jimenez graduated from high school in Colegio San Agustin – Makati. On that same year, she became part of the year's batch of artists launched in the Star Magic Circle together with Kyle Echarri, Belle Mariano, Sophie Reyes, Jeremiah Lisbo, Gillian Vicencio, Arielle Roces, Arabella del Rosario, Anthony Jennings, JC Alcantara, Glen Vargas, Kendru Garcia, Eisel Serrano, RA Lewis, Javi Benitez, and Aiyana Waggoner.

Soon after, Jimenez landed the role of Sonya, a friend and ally of the rich-spoiled brat Luna Dela Cuesta (played by Alexa Ilacad) in drama series The Killer Bride, the drama series.

In November of the same year, Jimenez took part of the then upcoming iWantTFC original series He's Into Her, starring Donny Pangilinan and Belle Mariano, directed by Chad Vidanes, based on the 2013 Wattpad novel of the same name by Maxine Lat a.k.a. Maxinejiji. The production for the project was postponed due to the COVID-19 pandemic, ABS-CBN shutdown and the denial of franchise renewal.

=== 2020–2021: Always, He's Into Her, and Gen Z ===
In 2020, Jimenez was part of Love Thy Woman, a Philippine drama television series.

In the same year, Jimenez released her debut single titled Always. It is an original composition that embodies her dreamy indie-pop voice. Currently, the independently-launched-and-produced track has already reached over 170,000 streams on Spotify.

In 2021, Jimenez scored her first lead role as Michelle in the coming-of-age series Gen Z.

In the same year, Jimenez took on the role of Elle Luna, the half sister of Maxpein Del Valle Luna (played by Belle Mariano) in the long-awaited series He's Into Her. Following the series' success, the cast headlined a special online concert, He's Into Her: The Benison Ball for the fans. Unfortunately, she wasn't able to attend the concert as she was on a lock-in taping at the time. At the end of show, it was announced that a second season of the show will take place. Shortly after the successful concert, ABS-CBN Entertainment also unveiled He's Into Her: The Journey, a documentary about the making of the series. Later that year, He's Into Her was re-edited and was released as a movie in iWantTFC.

Apart from this, Jimenez came back with a new single Killer Boy under new music label Warner Music Philippines. The track has surpassed 180,000 streams on Spotify and has been a part of over 1000 playlists worldwide. It has also been featured in almost 1,000 videos on TikTok, with over 2 million views. Later that year, she released another original single entitled Lovers Club.

=== 2022–2023: Being Recast in He's Into Her and Don't You Dare Leave ===
In 2022, the second season of He's Into Her officially premiered. Bini member Mikha Lim took over her role as Elle Luna, as she is currently taking a Double bachelor's degree in Business and Communication at the Queensland University of Technology.

After this, the Movie Cut of the first season of He's Into Her premiered at the Drive-In Cinema One: A Drive-Thru Movie Experience, in partnership with Ayala Malls Vertis North and Vertis North Estate.

== Filmography ==
=== Television/Digital ===
Year	Title	Role
2016	Wansapanataym: Tikboyong	Wendy
2017	FPJ's Ang probinsyano	Sally
2017	Maalaala Mo Kaya: Family Tree	Young Con
2018	Maalaala Mo Kaya: Pilat	June
2018	Maalaala Mo Kaya: Cards	Mina
2018	Maalaala Mo Kaya: Sementeryo	Tikang
2019	The Killer Bride	Sonya
2020	Love Thy Woman	Olivia Kho
2020	Maalaala Mo Kaya: Mural	Trixie
2021	Gen Z	Michelle
2021	He's Into Her	Elle Luna

=== Films ===
Year	Title	Role
2016	Barcelona: A Love Untold	Macky dela Torre
2019	The Heiress	Young Carmen
2021	He's Into Her: The Movie Cut Part 1	Elle Luna
2021	He's Into Her: The Movie Cut Part 2	Elle Luna
2022	He's Into Her: The Movie Cut	Elle Luna
2024	Bantay-Bahay	Teresa

=== Documentary ===
Year	Title	Role
2021	He's Into Her: The Journey	Herself

== Discography ==
=== Singles ===
Year	Title	Performed by	Label
2020	Always	Melizza	—N/a
2021	Killer Boy	Melizza	Warner Music Philippines
2021	Lovers Club	Melizza	Warner Music Philippines
2022	Don't You Dare Leave	Melizza	Warner Music Philippines

=== Composition Credits ===
Year	Title	Performed by	Written and Composed by	Produced by	With Credit	Label
2020	Always	Melizza	credited as Melizza Tanpoco	Melizza Tanpoco	Yes	—N/a
2021	Killer Boy	Melizza	credited as Melizza Jaune R. Tanpoco	Melizza Tanpoco, Markus Davis Jr.	Yes	Warner Music Philippines
2021	Lovers Club	Melizza	credited as Melizza Jaune R. Tanpoco	Melizza Tanpoco, Cavill, Kindred Productions	Yes	Warner Music Philippines
2022	Don't You Dare Leave	Melizza	credited as Melizza Jaune R. Tanpoco	Melizza Tanpoco, Kindred Productions	Yes	Warner Music Philippines
