= Untold (film) =

- Theatrical release poster
- Directed by: Derick Cabrido
- Screenplay by: Enrico C. Santos
- Story by: Derick Cabrido; Roselle Y. Monteverde; Noreen Capili; Anton Santamaria
- Starring: Jodi Sta. Maria; Juan Karlos Labajo; Kaori Oinuma; Mylene Dizon; Joem Bascon; Lianne Valentin; Sarah Edwards; Gloria Diaz
- Edited by: Renewin Alano; Jayvee Margaja
- Music by: Von De Guzman
- Production company: Regal Entertainment
- Distributed by: Film Development Council of the Philippines; Regal Entertainment; CreatePHFilms
- Release date: April 30, 2025
- Running time: 108 minutes
- Country: Philippines
- Language: Filipino

Untold is a 2025 Philippine psychological horror film directed by Derick Cabrido. It stars Jodi Sta. Maria, Juan Karlos Labajo, Kaori Oinuma, Lianne Valentin, Mylene Dizon, Joem Bascon, Sarah Edwards and Gloria Diaz. The film is Jodi Sta. Maria's first horror film under Regal Films and her fourth time leading a horror project. It is the final film approved by Lily Monteverde before her death.

== Plot ==
Vivian Vera (Jodi Sta. Maria) is a celebrated journalist and the face of the tabloid-style investigative series Untold on Mon News Network. Her career is marked by sensational exposés that have propelled her to fame, but beneath her polished exterior lies a history of ethical compromises and fabricated stories.

One of her most notorious reports involved the "Cement Massacre," where a group of informal settlers protesting against a development project by Cateland Development were brutally killed. Vivian's coverage of the incident, captured with the help of her cameraman Benjie (Joem Bascon), catapulted her to stardom. However, the veracity of her reporting is questionable, as it becomes evident that she manipulated facts to serve her ambition.

Years later, Vivian is assigned to interview Ernesto Malugay (Francis Mata), the security chief implicated in the massacre, who has been released from prison due to lack of evidence. As she delves into this assignment, Vivian begins experiencing disturbing hallucinations and encounters with apparitions of the massacre victims, appearing disfigured and half-buried in concrete.

The supernatural occurrences intensify when a mysterious woman named Diana (Angel Raymundo) confronts Vivian, accusing her of burying the truth and presenting her with a cursed bracelet. This encounter triggers a series of events where individuals connected to Vivian's past, including Benjie and Ernesto, meet gruesome deaths, seemingly at the hands of vengeful spirits.

Vivian's grip on reality begins to falter as she experiences time lapses, memory gaps, and increasingly violent visions. Her interactions with colleagues, such as the ambitious junior reporter Louise Amador (Kaori Oinuma), become strained as Louise investigates the inconsistencies in Vivian's past reports. Vivian's mother, Monica Vera (Gloria Diaz), observes her daughter's deteriorating mental state with growing concern.

In a series of flashbacks, it's revealed that Vivian's unethical practices extend beyond the Cement Massacre. In a bid to outshine her rival Elaine Arnaiz (Sarah Edwards), Vivian fabricated a story about a restaurant serving cat meat, going so far as to kill her own pet cat, Kitty Marie, to produce convincing footage.

As the haunting intensifies, Vivian becomes convinced that she is cursed by the victims' families and that her only escape is to confess her "untold" crimes. The film culminates in a harrowing confrontation where Vivian must choose between revealing the truth, thereby destroying her career, or succumbing to the wrath of the vengeful spirits.

== Cast ==
- Jodi Sta. Maria as Vivian Vera
- Joem Bascon as Benjie
- Juan Karlos Labajo as Jasper Torres
- Mylene Dizon as Sylvia
- Kaori Oinuma as Louise Amador
- Sarah Edwards as Elaine Arnaiz
- Lianne Valentin as Amanda
- Gloria Diaz as Monica Vera
- TJ Valderrama as Lucy
- Gian Magdangal as Geraldo Vera
- Miggs Cuaderno as Spike
- Carlo San Juan as Devlin
- Ge Villamil as Teresa
- Lui Manansala as Chloe
- Frances Makil as Nanay
- Angel Raymundo as Diana Santillan
- Francis Mata as Ernesto Malugay
- Angie Castrence as Benjie's mom
- Lotlot Bustamante as Psychiatrist
- Elyson De Dios as Joshua

== Production ==
During the Regal legacy launch in Quezon City, Kaori Oinuma and Lianne Valentin announced to be part of the film Untold.

== Release ==
The film premiered in Cebu on March 29, 2025, and is scheduled for release on April 30, 2025, under Regal Films.

== Accolades ==
Accolades received by Untold
Award	Date of ceremony	Category	Recipient(s)	Result	Ref.
2025 Asian Academy Creative Awards	October 1, 2025	Best Actress in a Leading Role	Jodi Sta. Maria	Won	
