= Tara, G! =

Philippine streaming television miniseries

- Official poster
- Genre: Romantic comedy, Drama
- Written by: Gena Tenaja; Karen Israel
- Directed by: Catherine Camarillo
- Starring: Anthony Jennings; Daniela Stranner; Kaori Oinuma; JC Alcantara; CJ Salonga; Zach Castañeda; Vivoree Esclito
- Music by: Jessie Lasaten
- Opening theme: "Tara G!" by The Juans
- Ending theme: "Tara G!" by The Juans
- Composer: Jonathan Manalo
- Country of origin: Philippines
- Original language: Filipino
- No. of episodes: 10

Production
- Executive producers: Carlo L. Katigbak; Cory V. Vidanes; Olivia M. Lamasan; Jamie C. Lopez; Ginny Monteagudo-Ocampo
- Producers: Sackey Prince Pendatun; Kristine P. Sioson
- Production locations: Atok, Benguet; Baguio
- Editors: Jenilie Pelayo; Omar Cervantes; Glenn Lumba; Yiezzel Gatdula
- Running time: 36–59 minutes
- Production companies: Star Cinema; Star Creatives

Original release
- Network: iWantTFC
- Release: October 7 – December 9, 2022

Tara, G! is a Philippine television miniseries directed by Catherine Camarillo. The series premiered from October 7 to December 9, 2022, on iWantTFC.

== Synopsis ==
A traditional coffee farmer and his crew strive their hardest to help their elusive town of La Guerta reclaim its glory. But an eccentric city girl arrives and ruins everything, putting the friends back to square one.

== Cast and characters ==
=== Main cast ===
Team WISE (Walang Iwanan Sa Ere)

- Anthony Jennings as Rocky Hernandez / Rocky Sebastian – the charming and dependable leader of the group. Continues his mother's legacy of creating a ground coffee brand.
- Daniela Stranner as Cars - the beautiful but narcissistic wealthy tourist from the city. A vlogger whose online reputation goes downhill after a video of her trends.
- Kaori Oinuma as Legs – the smart and caring darling. Returns to La Guerta for the summer after studying in college in the city.
- JC Alcantara as Dan – a handsome smooth talker who has a crush on Legs.
- CJ Salonga as Smith – the academically intelligent member of the group.
- Zach Castañeda as Will – the funny, go-to-guy and Smith's protective older brother.
- Vivoree Esclito as Jengjeng – a sweet girl with big dreams. Plans to also attend college in the city.

=== Supporting cast ===
- Dominic Ochoa as Gov. Miguel Sebastian - Governor of Tanaw and Rocky's biological father.
- Katya Santos as Celine – Dan's mother and Gov. Sebastian's accomplice.
- Jayson Gainza as Vito Hernandez – Rocky's stepfather.
- Arlene Muhlach as Jada – Will and Smith's mother.
- Lara Morena as Maya Hernandez – Rocky's late mother and Vito's wife.
- Denise Joaquin as Lea - Legs' mother and Arm's wife.
- Karen Timbol as Gracia – Corrine and Cars’ mother.
- Ingrid dela Paz as Corrine – manager of La Guerta's local inn, and Cars’ older sister.
- Marithez Samson
- Bryan Sy as Arms – Legs’ father and Lea's husband.
- Martha Comia as Jolens – Jengjeng's mother. The situation in La Guerta causes her to consider working in the city for stable financial support for herself and her daughter.
- Karl Gabriel as Marcus - Cars' ex-boyfriend.
- Elyson de Dios

== Episodes ==
| No. | Title | Original release date |
|---|---|---|
| 1 | "La Guerta" | October 7, 2022 |
To help La Guerta reclaim its glory and prevent his friends from leaving, young coffee farmer Rocky prepares for a one-time big-time deal with a coffee wine client. However, an eccentric city girl arrives and spoils his plans for his beloved town.
| 2 | "Plan OBBB" | October 14, 2022 |
Team WISE devises Plan OBBB to stop Jengjeng and her mom from leaving La Guerta. On the contrary, Rocky wishes Cars gone before she creates more trouble in their town. Soon, he discovers Cars' bizarre ability, which makes him want to change his mind.
| 3 | "Para Kay Kulangot" | October 21, 2022 |
Cars is forced to work at the coffee farm to reclaim her phone from Rocky. Eager to earn more to buy the parts needed to repair Kulangot, Rocky sells coffee beans in town while Dan, Smith, and Will join a male pageant hoping to win the grand prize.
| 4 | "Waiting Game" | October 28, 2022 |
Team WISE goes on their first road trip, unaware that Cars is sleeping in the back of their truck. Legs burns with jealousy as Cars is left to work with Rocky on his deliveries, prompting Dan to confront her about her feelings for his cousin.
| 5 | "Scandal" | November 4, 2022 |
Cars and Smith get caught in a malicious scandal. Cars later comes up with a clever way to help Team WISE sell their coffee beans, but her presence continues to provoke tension within the group. This prompts Rocky to gather his friends for a talk.
| 6 | "Trouble" | November 11, 2022 |
While the elders of La Guerta are deeply concerned and baffled over the eviction notice, Cars develops an idea to help Team WISE’s coffee business thrives. However, Legs stumbles upon Cars’ video scandal and insists to remove her from the project.
| 7 | "Fight or Flight" | November 18, 2022 |
Even after the barn burned down, Rocky refuses to give up and continues working with Cars to earn funds and sponsorship for Kape't Kamay. Team WISE is in disbelief when Cars left without a word, unaware that Legs forced her to leave.
| 8 | "Kape't Kamay" | November 25, 2022 |
After landing herself in hot water for what she did to Cars, Legs relives a past trauma upon coming across a familiar face. While the elders of La Guerta scramble to earn money to pay for the land tax, Smith finds a stash of cash among Will's things.
| 9 | "For Here or To Go?" | December 2, 2022 |
Will's confession leads to one shocking revelation after another. While everyone—including Rocky—has slowly come to terms with their beloved town's ill fate, Cars continues to find ways to save La Guerta.
| 10 | "Wise" | December 9, 2022 |
Team WISE officially welcomes Cars to the group and launches its Kape't Kamay coffee truck business without Rocky. While Kap tries his hardest to make it up to his friends, Dan and Legs make a bet with the future of their relationship at stake.

== Production ==
=== Background ===
The project was first announced at an iWantTFC event on December 10, 2021, with Jennings, Stranner, Oinuma, Alcantara, Salonga, Castañeda, and Esclito (who at that time was also slated to be part of the third season of Click, Like, Share and the second season of He's Into Her, both iWantTFC original shows) as the main cast members.

=== Marketing ===
Numerous teasers were released before the official trailer was released on September 7, 2022.

=== Music ===
Apart from the theme song "Tara, G!" by The Juans, the show's main cast members performed a rendition of the theme song. Also included in the series' soundtrack are "Pambihirang Harana" by Cesca, and "Hindi Pa Natin Alam" by Trisha Denise and Benedix Ramos.

== Release ==
=== Broadcast ===
The series premiered on October 7 to December 9, 2022, on iWantTFC.

The series had its Philippine TV Premiere from May 20 to June 18, 2023, on Yes Weekend primetime block on Kapamilya Channel, Kapamilya Online Live and A2Z replacing Misis Piggy, and was replaced by Teen Clash.

This series is aired again on July 21, 2024, during Yes Weekend's Sunday block on Kapamilya Channel and A2Z.
