= Four Sisters Before the Wedding =

2020 Philippine comedy-drama film

- Official release poster
- Directed by: Mae Cruz-Alviar
- Written by: Vanessa R. Valdez
- Based on: characters created for the original screenplay Four Sisters and a Wedding by Jose Javier Reyes
- Produced by: Carlo Katigbak; Olivia Lamasan
- Starring: Charlie Dizon; Alexa Ilacad; Gillian Vicencio; Belle Mariano
- Cinematography: Neil Daza
- Edited by: Marya Ignacio
- Music by: Cesar Francis Concio
- Production companies: ABS-CBN Film Productions, Inc.; SCX
- Distributed by: Star Cinema
- Release date: December 11, 2020
- Running time: 116 minutes
- Country: Philippines
- Language: Filipino

Four Sisters Before the Wedding is a 2020 Philippine family comedy-drama film directed by Mae Cruz-Alviar, produced by Star Cinema and SCX. It serves as both a prequel and a sequel to the 2013 film, Four Sisters and a Wedding. It premiered on December 11, 2020, via KTX, iWant TFC, Sky Cable PPV, Cignal PPV as well as at SM Cinemas and CityMall Cinemas in select modified general community quarantine areas.

== Plot ==
The Salazar sisters hold a virtual meeting to discuss their brother CJ's marital problems and reminisce a similar problem during their adolescence.

Years ago, the siblings celebrate their grandmother Ibiang's birthday. Over dinner, Ibiang criticizes their father Caloy for his insufficient income as a schoolteacher. Later, the siblings hear their mother Grace arguing with their father Caloy over his relationship with a certain Linda. Suspecting an affair, Teddie asks Grace her plans on their wedding anniversary. She answers that they will separate, shocking the siblings. Bobbie subsequently learns that Linda is the first name of Mrs. Malvar, Caloy's boss. In a café, Alex sees Caloy embracing a girl asking for a DNA sample from him. When the siblings update each other, their maid Tina Marie, who overhears them, suggests they hire a spy, Bette, who seduces the café's guard to obtain the CCTV footage. Upon reviewing the footage, Alex sees a poster of Caloy's companion, which her crush Chad identifies as a singer named Love Mae Tete. Meanwhile, Grace meets with Edwin, her first love. Later, Gabbie sees a suggestive message from Erwin on Grace's cellphone, leading her to believe that her mother is having an affair.

Grace and Caloy learn that Bobbie qualified for a student exchange program to New York. Caloy recommends her to a scholarship from Linda and announces that Linda recruited him for a five-year teaching job in the U.S. and will temporarily stay at her house. Teddie is convinced that Caloy is having an affair, but Bobbie expresses doubt when her mother agrees with Caloy's plans.

Love Mae calls Caloy to meet again at the café. Alex overhears this and calls Bette. In the café, Chad, who also meets separately with Love Marie, confesses his feelings to Bobbie, having met earlier during one of Alex's film shoots, despite Bobbie's objections. They are overheard by Alex, who gets upset. Teddie taunts Bobbie, leading to a three-way fight with Alex, which is stopped when they are nearly hit by a car carrying Ibiang. Chad later apologizes to Alex and explains that he admires how Bobbie is so protective and loving of her. Meanwhile, Teddie reconnects with her former crush Jeremy, while Gabbie falls for her bestfriend JP, who decides to join the priesthood, breaking her heart.

After Linda arrives for a seminar, Bette hatches a plan to confront her and Love Mae at the venue by luring them to an adjacent ballroom which they book under the pretense of staging a debut. At the venue, Linda meets Bobbie, saying that she recognizes her from Caloy's pictures in their office and expresses her excitement at taking her in, saying that she would be taken care of in New York by her godson Tristan. (Note: Bobbie's boyfriend and later husband in Four Sisters and a Wedding) Linda, Love Mae, and another Linda, surnamed Jacinto, proceed to the ballroom, where Tina Marie and Bette claim to be Gabbie's parents. Mrs. Malvar, with her previous knowledge of the Salazars, accuses them of being criminals, while the siblings accuse her and Love Mae of being homewreckers. Their parents and CJ arrive to see them fighting with the "mistresses".

Caloy explains Mrs. Malvar helped him financially when she offered him a job at the school, where he met Linda Jacinto, who is revealed to be the Linda mentioned by Grace earlier. Grace clarifies that she does not have an affair with Edwin as he is gay, while Love Mae turns out to be Caloy's niece following the results of her DNA test. With the problems resolved, Grace and Caloy reaffirm their love for each other, while the girls apologize to Love Mae and Mrs. Malvar. Tina Marie comes out as a lesbian and renames herself Toti Marie.

In the present, CJ confesses that he almost cheated on his wife Princess. His sisters urge him to come clean and ask her forgiveness, while reminding him of their love.

== Cast ==
Main cast

- Charlie Dizon as young Teddie
- Alexa Ilacad as young Bobbie
- Gillian Vicencio as young Alex
- Belle Mariano as young Gabbie

Supporting cast

- Carmina Villaroel as Grace Salazar
- Dominic Ochoa as Carlos "Caloy" Salazar
- Clarence Delgado as young CJ / Reb-Reb
- Cai Cortez as Matutina Marie "Toti Marie / Tina Marie" Bugayong
- Kakai Bautista as Susiebeth "Bette" Sanchez
- Irma Adlawan as Lola Ibiang (Grace's mother and Caloy's mother-in-law)
- Jameson Blake as Jeremy Yulo
- Joao Constancia as Chad Quinto
- Jeremiah Lisbo as John Paul / JP
- Gigi De Lana as Love Mae S. Tete (Caloy's niece)
- Pinky Amador as Linda Malvar (Tristan Harris's great-godmother)
- Minnie Aguilar as Manang Bugayong
- Hanz Correa as Gino
- Karen Toyoshima as Direk Arah
- Boom Labrusca as Edwin
- Jenny Miller as Rosa
- Debbie Garcia as Linda Jacinto (Caloy's assistant principal in Cagayan)

Special Participation

- Toni Gonzaga as Theodora Grace "Teddie" Salazar-Teodoro (Frodo Teodoro's wife)
- Bea Alonzo as Roberta Olivia "Bobbie" Salazar-Harris (Tristan Harris's wife and Trixie Harris's stepmother)
- Angel Locsin as Dir. Alexandra Camille "Alex" Salazar (a film director)
- Shaina Magdayao as Gabriella Sophia "Gabbie" Salazar
- Enchong Dee as Carlos Jose "CJ / Reb-Reb" Salazar (Princess Antoinette May Bayag-Salazar's husband)
- Freddie Webb as Grace's father (shown in the movie in a still picture with Grace's mother Ibiang)

== Soundtrack ==
No.	Title	Performer(s)	Length
1.	"Maligaya ang Buhay - From "Four Sisters Before the Wedding"	Inigo Pascual	3:01
2.	"Let Go Of Your Heart - Movie Version"	Unit 406	5:00
3.	"Mahal Kong Maria"	Unit 406	4:03
4.	"Maligaya Ang Buhay - Christmas Remix"	Inigo Pascual	3:11
Total length:			15:25

== Production ==
On February 27, 2020, Star Cinema announced that the 2013 movie Four Sisters and a Wedding would have a prequel.

On October 10, 2020, Ilacad posted a photo with her co-stars on her Instagram page, confirming that the production of the film was underway.
