= Love Is Color Blind =

2021 romantic comedy film by John Leo D. Garcia

- Promotional release poster
- Directed by: John Leo Datuin Garcia
- Story by: Kristen Gabriel; Simon Lloyd Arciaga; Tammy Dinopol
- Produced by: Carlo Katigbak; Olivia Lamasan
- Starring: Donny Pangilinan; Belle Mariano
- Cinematography: Cesca Lee
- Edited by: Marya Ignacio
- Music by: Francis Concio
- Production company: Star Cinema
- Distributed by: ABS-CBN Film Productions
- Release dates: December 9, 2021 (video premiere); December 10, 2021
- Running time: 115 minutes
- Country: Philippines
- Language: Filipino

Love Is Color Blind is a 2021 Philippine romantic comedy film directed by John Leo Datuin Garcia, starring Donny Pangilinan and Belle Mariano on their first film together.

The worldwide premiere was held virtually on December 9, 2021, on KTX.ph, while the worldwide release was on December 10, 2021, on various digital platforms. It's also available for streaming on Netflix starting March 1, 2022.

== Synopsis ==
After finishing her certification course in Hong Kong, Cara (Belle Mariano) returns to the Philippines and reunites with her best friend, Ino (Donny Pangilinan), whom she’s also loved throughout the years. In seeing him again, she is shocked to see how much the tragic accident, which took his mom’s life and left him colorblind, caused him to struggle in getting on with life. To bring back the colors in the life of her artist friend, Cara helps him to paint the centerpiece in the upcoming exhibition of his late mom.

As Ino gives painting another try, he meets the gallery curator, Iris (Angelina Cruz), in whom Ino saw the color red again. As Iris helps Ino cope with his colorblindness, their gradual closeness leaves Cara heartbroken, forcing her to make a tough decision about fighting for Ino’s love. Meanwhile, Ino struggles to get past the trauma of the accident, as well as the grief that stands in the way of him opening himself to love once more.

== Cast ==
=== Main cast ===
- Belle Mariano as Caramel "Cara" Arevalo
- Donny Pangilinan as Domino "Ino" Urbano
- Jeremiah Lisbo as Sky
- Angelina Cruz as Iris

=== Supporting cast ===
- Eula Valdez as Ella Villanueva-Urbano
- Ariel Rivera as Fidel Urbano
- John Lapus as Tita Vicky Arevalo
- Donna Cariaga as Stephi Arevalo
- Arabella Davao as Ate Candy Arevalo
- Reich Alim as Jam Arevalo
- Mika Pajares as Nelly
- Amanda Zamora as Kimmi
- Lloyd Samartino as Ninong Gary
- Esnyr Ranollo as Andrei / Precious / Balong
- Hyubs Azarcon as Chip Pong
- Ryan Bang as Ryan

== Official soundtrack ==
Love is Color Blind (Original Soundtrack)

Soundtrack album by Belle Mariano & SAB
- Released: December 17, 2021
- Recorded: 2021
- Genres: OPM, Indie pop, Soundtrack
- Length: 9:52
- Language: English
- Label: Star Music
- Producer: Jonathan Manalo

The official soundtrack for the series was released on December 17, 2021, and consists of tracks mostly composed by Trisha Denise and SAB.

Love is Color Blind (Original Soundtrack)
No.	Title	Writer(s)	Artist	Length
1.	"For Your Eyes Only"	Trisha Denise	Belle Mariano	3:26
2.	"Dancing In The Dark"	Sabine Cerrado	SAB	3:33
3.	"Blue and Red"	Sabine Cerrado	SAB	2:51
Total length:				9:52

== Reception ==
Upon release, Love is Color Blind became the highest-grossing movie and the biggest digital premiere on KTX.ph. It also became the overall No. 1 title on Netflix Philippines, as well as in United Arab Emirates, Qatar, and Bahrain.

== Release ==
Love Is Color Blind was released globally on December 10, 2021, via iWantTFC, KTX.ph, Smart GigaPlay, Cignal Pay-Per-View, SKY Pay-Per-View, and TFC IPTV.

The film is also available to stream on Netflix beginning March 1, 2022 in selected territories.
