= Markus Paterson =

Filipino-British actor, singer, host and footballer

- Born: Mark Paul Robert Paterson; 3 June 1998 (age 28); London, England
- Occupations: Actor; host; singer
- Years active: 2016–present
- Agent: Star Magic (2016–present); Rise Artists Studio (2020–2024)
- Label: Tarsier Records
- Height: 5 ft 11 in (180 cm)
- Partner: Janella Salvador (2019–2022)
- Children: 1

Mark Paul "Markus" Robert Paterson (born 3 June 1998) is a Filipino-British actor, singer, television host and footballer based in the Philippines.

== Early life and education ==
Mark Paul Robert Paterson was born in England. He is of Filipino and British descent. He is the only child of Pangasinan entrepreneur Norma Mario Paterson and former British Air Force pilot George Trevor Paterson. He started playing football at the age of six and looks up to the renowned football player Cristiano Ronaldo.

In 2007, he moved to Manila and enrolled at Reedley International School. He had started learning to speak Tagalog, was sent back to England, and returned to the Philippines in 2016 where he is studying Hospitality Management at Enderun Colleges. While in college, he played professionally for the Kaya F.C. Elite.

== Acting career ==
He was scouted by a manager, which began his career in the entertainment industry. One of his first hosting gigs was as a VJ of MTV Philippines, where he presented programs such as MTV Philippines Fuel.

== Personal life ==
He was in a relationship with actress Janella Salvador.

On October 20, 2020, Salvador gave birth to their son Jude in Bath, Somerset, England. A YouTube video titled Hey, Jude released on January 5, 2021 documented her pregnancy journey.

== Acting credits ==
=== Film ===
Key
| † | Denotes films that have not yet been released |

| Year | Title | Role | Ref. |
|---|---|---|---|
| 2018 | Ang Babaeng Allergic sa WiFi | Leo | |
| 2018 | Tres | | |
| 2018 | Mamu: And A Mother Too | Kiko | |
| 2019 | Dead Kids | Chuck Santos | |
| 2021 | Hello, Stranger: The Movie | Simon | |
| 2024 | Fruitcake | Dax | |

=== Television / Digital ===
Key
| † | Denotes shows and digital that have not yet been released |

| Year | Title | Role | Ref. |
|---|---|---|---|
| 2016 | Pinoy Boyband Superstar | Contestant | |
| 2016–2024; 2025–present | ASAP XP | Himself / co-host / Performer | |
| 2018 | Sana Dalawa ang Puso | Patrick Sovichel | |
| 2018 | Wansapanataym: ManiKEN ni Monica | Joseph | |
| 2019 | Maalaala Mo Kaya: White Ribbon | Timothy | |
| 2019 | High | Miguel | |
| 2019 | Maalaala Mo Kaya: Lipstick | Estefan | |
| 2019 | Kargo | | |
| 2020 | Maalaala Mo Kaya: Kotse | Danny | |
| 2021–2022 | Viral Scandal | Councilor Diego "Jigs" Ramones | |
| 2022 | Maalaala Mo Kaya: Cake | Greg | |
| 2022 | ERO | Titan Hernandez | |
| 2022–2023 | K-Love | Pedro | |
| 2023 | Teen Clash | Jude | |
| 2023-2024 | Pira-Pirasong Paraiso | Boy "Kano" Guinto-Abiog / Michael | |
| 2024 | Halfmates | Gary | |
| 2024 | Wish Ko Lang: Sayang na Ganda | David | |
| 2024–2025 | Lavender Fields | Freddie Valderama | |

== See also ==
- Iñigo Pascual
- Jameson Blake
- Sue Ramirez
- Tony Labrusca
- BoybandPH
- Pinoy Boyband Superstar
