= Vivoree Esclito =

Filipino actress (born 2000)

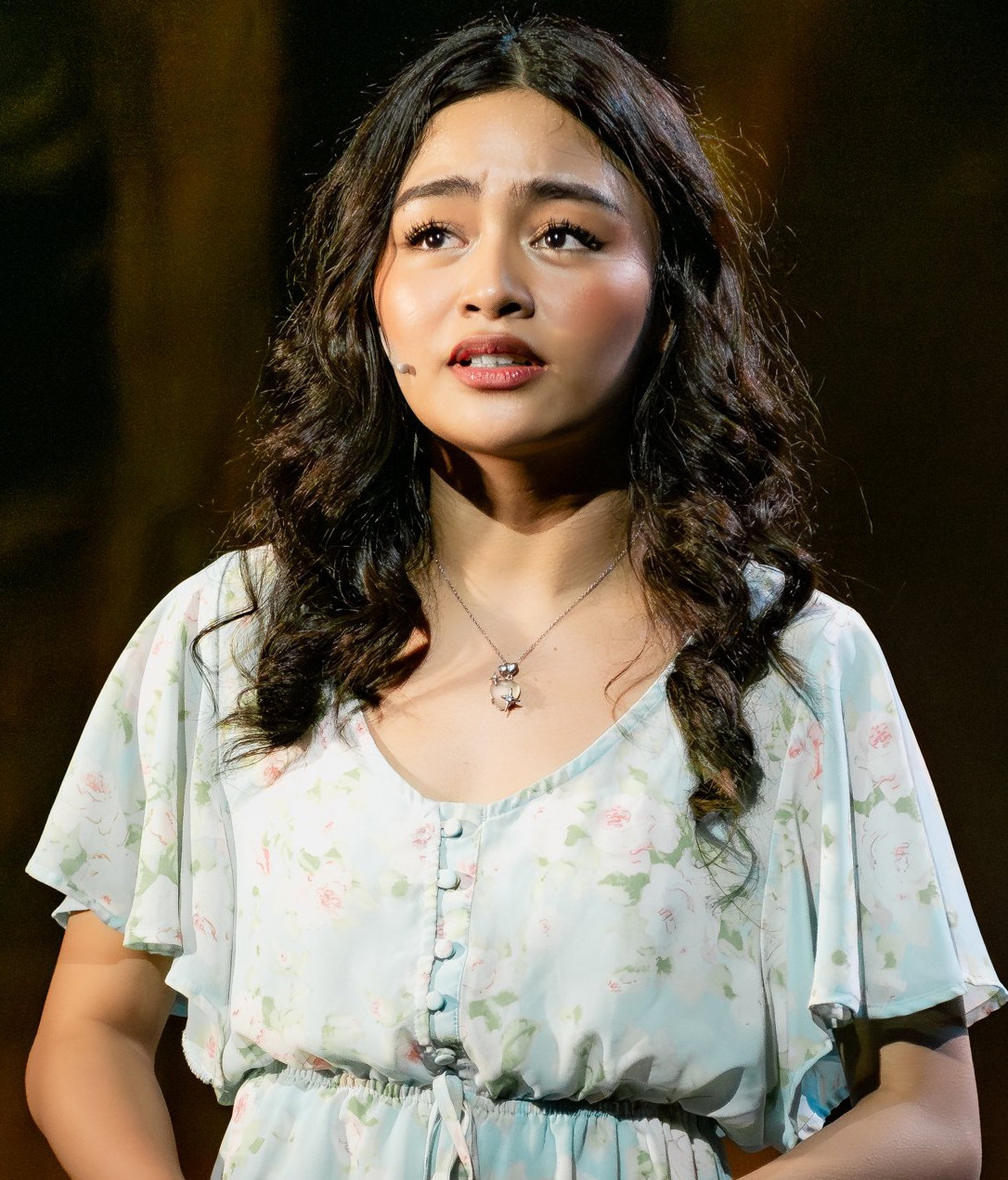
- Esclito in Tabing Ilog the Musical in November 2024
- Born: Maria Vivoree Niña Matutes Esclito; August 3, 2000 (age 26); Loon, Bohol, Philippines
- Occupations: Actress; Singer; TV host; Model; content creator
- Years active: 2016–present
- Agents: Star Magic (2017–present); Rise Artists Studio (2020–2024)
- Height: 1.60 m (5 ft 3 in)

TikTok information
- Page: vivoree
- Followers: 3.4 million

YouTube information
- Channel: Vivoree
- Genre: Vlogging
- Subscribers: 778,000
- Views: 51.9 million
- Musical career
- Genres: OPM; Pop
- Label: Star Music
- Last updated: November 29, 2024

Maria Vivoree Niña Matutes Esclito (English: /ˈvaɪvoʊriː/ VAI-voh-ree; Tagalog: [ˌvaɪ̯voˈɾi ʔɛsˈkliːt̪o]; born August 3, 2000), known mononymously as Vivoree, is a Filipino singer, actress, television personality, model, and content creator. She first rose to prominence as one of the teen contestants on the reality show Pinoy Big Brother: Lucky 7. Over the years, Esclito has achieved further recognition for work in film, music, and television, most notably as a main cast member of the teen romantic comedy series He's Into Her and the boys' love (BL) romantic comedy series Hello Stranger.

Jason Tan Liwag of Rappler named Esclito as a standout actor in the 2021 film adaptation of the latter. She is also known for her online presence and commercial modeling work. In 2025, an essay published in the Philippine Daily Inquirer's Young Blood column praised Esclito's The Iron Heart character Penelope for providing positive Visayan representation, noting that "her morena skin and language—with Bisaya lines delivered flawlessly by Esclito, whose mother tongue is Bisaya in real life—weren’t used as punchlines."

On August 17, 2025, Esclito became the first actor to also sing live at a Wish Date event. The Wish Date concert series, organized by Wish 107.5, combines short films with live musical storytelling. She also starred as a character inspired by Jolina Magdangal, Lyn-lyn/Jo-C, in the Netflix original musical romance film One Hit Wonder. It premiered on the streaming service on August 21.

== Early life and education ==
Maria Vivoree Niña Matutes Esclito was born on August 3, 2000, in Loon, Bohol. She is the eldest of three siblings. Her mother, Tetchie Esclito, is an elementary school teacher. Her father, Jun Esclito, is a seafarer from Davao Oriental. Esclito briefly lived in Davao as a child, before moving back to Bohol with her family. She had a premature birth. When Esclito was newly born, a doctor told her mother that she was unlikely to survive. Her name, Vivoree, comes from the English word survivor.

Esclito completed her elementary school education at the Holy Name University, where her mother also teaches. She pursued her secondary education at the Tagbilaran City Science High School. Esclito once competed in a beauty pageant in high school, but according to her, the experience was so "traumatic" it made her never want to join another one. In 2016, she joined the ABS-CBN reality competition show Pinoy Big Brother. Her stint on the show interrupted her education. In May 2020, Esclito graduated from high school under a homeschool program by the Catholic Filipino Academy. She received a character award for generosity and an academic award for Philippine politics and governance. She is studying entrepreneurship at Thames International College. (Note: This refers to a school in Quezon City, Philippines, not the Thames International College found in Nepal.)

== Career ==
=== Film and television ===
On August 3, 2016, the Philippine talk show Tonight with Boy Abunda introduced Esclito as the "Go-Getter Girl ng (of) Bohol", a new teen "housemate" (contestant) on Pinoy Big Brother: Lucky 7, the seventh season of Pinoy Big Brother. She was celebrating her 16th birthday at the time. Esclito admitted to the host, Boy Abunda, that she experienced bullying due to her hairiness. She was the third teen housemate to be introduced to the public, after the German-Filipino Edward Barber and Yong Muhajil from Zamboanga. She intentionally cried during her audition for Lucky 7, believing that it would increase her chances of joining the reality show. Esclito was eliminated from Lucky 7 on Day 101 of the season, shortly following the elimination of fellow teen housemate, the Italian-Filipino Marco Gallo.

Fresh from her stint on Lucky 7, Esclito enrolled in acting workshops. Her father did not approve of her pursuit of showbiz, urging her to return to Bohol and focus on her education. He gave Esclito an ultimatum, saying that if she failed to secure a project offer a month after her elimination from Lucky 7, she would need to come home. Esclito's lack of work following her Lucky 7 stint, particularly in comparison to Maymay Entrata and Kisses Delavin, who had participated in the same season and found instant success in the industry, took a toll on her mental health. However, Esclito was offered a project before the deadline, so her pursuit of showbiz continued. In 2017, Esclito appeared on three ABS-CBN programs: episodes of the anthology drama programs Maalaala Mo Kaya (lit. 'Would You Remember') and Ipaglaban Mo! (lit. 'Fight For It!') and the weekly variety show ASAP. The year marked a slow start for Esclito's career as an actress.

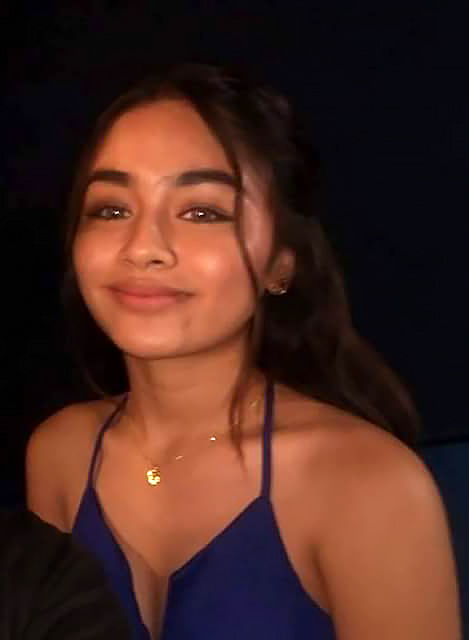
Esclito in 2017

In 2018, Esclito auditioned for the romance drama series Araw Gabi (lit. 'Day Night') and met the actor Charles Kieron for the first time. On May 6, an advertising specialist for ABS-CBN posted on Twitter that Esclito and Kieron were filming for a new episode of Ipaglaban Mo!. Many fans assumed that the two would be paired up in the episode. In reality, Kieron's character was courting the sister of Esclito's character. Nonetheless, the idea of Kieron and Esclito becoming a love team gained popularity.

Esclito portrayed the recurring character Charie Tamayo in the action drama series Asintado (lit. 'Sharpshooter'), her first afternoon teleserye, and AJ Punzalan in Since I Found You, her first primetime drama series, alongside established actors Piolo Pascual and Alessandra de Rossi. She landed her first lead role in the urban fantasy miniseries Wansapanataym Presents: ManiKEN ni Monica. (Note: The title translates to Monica's Mannequin in English, with the "quin" being replaced by "Ken", the name of Jerome Ponce's character.) The miniseries starred Esclito as Monica, an insecure young woman hoping to win the affections of her crush, Yoshi. She meets Ken, portrayed by Jerome Ponce, a fashion model cursed by a witch to become a mannequin due to his vanity. Monica strikes up an unlikely friendship with Ken, who needs unconditional love to become human again. ManiKEN aired from September 30 to November 4. Kieron played Esclito's love interest in all three series, and their love team, known by the portmanteau name "KierVi", was officially established by ABS-CBN.

Esclito played Mildred on the gothic horror series The Killer Bride, which aired from October 2019 to January 2020. Esclito and Kieron portrayed each other's love interest once again. They attended the ABS-CBN Ball together in 2018 and 2019.

In March 2019, Esclito appeared in the music video for the Regine Velasquez song "I Am Beautiful", along with other stars such as Nadine Lustre. The song promoted messages of self-love and women's empowerment. On November 9, Esclito was announced as a cast member on He's Into Her, a teen romantic comedy series based on the Wattpad novel by Maxinejiji.

In 2020, Esclito was among the roster of pioneer stars signed under Rise Artists Studio, a newly launched training and management subsidiary of ABS-CBN Films, in collaboration with Star Magic. The contract signing was held on February 6, 2020.

Esclito then appeared on Maalaala Mo Kaya episode "Ilog" in which she played the younger counterpart of Elvira (Vina Morales). This appearance yet again created a buzz among netizens as she reunited with former onscreen partner JC Alcantara, and has earned praises for Vivoree's improved acting alongside veteran Marissa Delgado.

On June 14, 2020, Black Sheep Productions, a division of ABS-CBN Films, previewed a teaser about their launching their first boys' love series at the height of the popularity of 2gether: The Series, a Thai boys' love series. Vivoree was announced to be a part of the cast and was later revealed to be playing the role Kookai Yambao, a friend of Mico Ramos played by JC Alcantara, she harbors unrequited feelings for the latter.

In February 2021, a contestant on the It's Showtime segment Hide and Sing revealed a hairy body part. Jugs Jugueta, one of the hosts, guessed that it was Esclito due to the contestant's hairiness. The clip went viral in the Philippines, with many Filipinos criticizing Jugueta for body shaming Esclito. Some users also pointed out that it was not the first time that the program's hosts mocked Esclito whenever a contestant on the segment revealed a hairy body part. The hashtag "NO TO BODY SHAMING" became a trend on Twitter; Esclito herself condemned the body shaming.

Esclito reprise her role as Kookai in Hello Stranger: the Movie, the film adaptation of the series. It premiered on the site KTX (stylized in all lowercase) on February 12. Jason Tan Liwag of Rappler praised the film's "vibrant" visuals and "colorful" characters. However, he also criticized its "reckless" pace, which he said resulted in "unearned" emotional moments. Nonetheless, Liwag commended the cast for "charm[ing] their way out of their obstacles", naming Esclito in particular as one of the standout actors, along with Miguel Almendras. He praised Esclito's ability to remain grounded as they shifted between comedy and emotional scenes.

Adapting to the new normal work modality, Rise Artists Studio launched its online format talk show on June 22, 2020, wherein Rise Artists interview different personalities via Zoom format. It was aired on Rise Artists Studio's Official YouTube channel and then aired on Kapamilya Channel and Kapamilya Online Live under Yes Weekend! block from May 30, 2021, to January 30, 2022.

In 2022, Esclito reprised her role as Ysay in the final season of He's Into Her. She also starred in the pilot episode of the anthology series Love Bites, as well as the teen drama miniseries Tara, G!, which premiered in September and October respectively. From December 2022 to 2023, Esclito played the young scientist Penelope in The Iron Heart. She filmed some of her scenes in Cebu and said that she felt at home during filming because of its proximity to her home province, Bohol. Writing for The Philippine Daily Inquirer's Young Blood column, (Note: an opinion column featuring essays by young Filipino writers below the age of 30) Julienne Loreto hailed Penelope as an example of positive Visayan representation in the media. They added, "Her morena skin and language—with Bisaya lines delivered flawlessly by Esclito, whose mother tongue is Bisaya in real life—weren't used as punchlines."

In September 2023, Nylon Manila reported that Esclito was filming for the then-upcoming drama movie In His Mother's Eyes. She was a regular cast member on the teleserye Can't Buy Me Love from 2023 to 2024. In August 2024, Esclito appeared in the Cebuano-language talk show Kuan on One.

On August 17, 2025, Esclito starred as Bianca Gonzales in Wish Date: Love Tales, a cinematic concert that combined a short film with live musical storytelling. She became the first Wish Date actor to also sing live at the event, performing an original track called "My Heart Promises". On August 21, the Netflix original musical romance film One Hit Wonder premiered on the streaming app, starring Esclito as Lyn-lyn/Jo-C, a Jolina Magdangal-inspired character. The film follows Filipino musicians in the 1990s.

=== Music ===
Esclito released her first single, "Kaya Pa" (lit. 'Still Capable') on iTunes in November 2016. In January 2019, Esclito and Charles Kieron released a digital album titled CK & Vivoree. Their album launch at the SM North EDSA Sky Dome was reportedly sold out. In late 2019, Esclito released a cover of the song "You're Still the One" by Shania Twain, which garnered acclaim and amassed more than 12 million views within five months (at the time of writing).

In 2023, Esclito was cast as one of the actresses for Eds, the protagonist of Tabing Ilog the Musical. (Note: Esclito, Sheena Belarmino, and Jhoanna Robles of Bini took turns playing Eds during the show's run in late 2023.) The play is a loose adaptation of the teen drama Tabing Ilog, which originally aired from 1999 to 2003. It modernizes the story to suit the Gen Z cast and characters. The play received mixed reviews. Eric Cabahug of Daily Tribune described Ilog as pleasant, but uninteresting. Kate Alvarez of Esquire Philippines wrote that Esclito and Akira Morishita were endearing as the play's main couple Eds and Rovic, but she hoped for a deeper exploration of other pairings as well. From November to December 2024, Esclito reprised her role as Eds in Ilog.

In 2024, Esclito released three singles and released her first solo mini-album, titled Movie Made for Me (stylized in all lowercase), alongside a new single of the same name.

=== Modeling ===
Esclito appeared on the cover of Village Pipol's September 2018 issue, alongside Awra Briguela. In the cover story, writer Lara Toldanes described Esclito as a "remarkable" Gen Z rising star with "charismatic beauty" and an "exceptional gift of angelic voice". In November 2019, she graced the cover of the fashion and art magazine Blnc, where she modeled for photographer Stephen Capuchino, with art direction by Jobo Nacpil. The magazine described her as "a luminous star[...] now synonymous with grace and talent", noting that her "morena beauty" transcended the country's conventional beauty standards.

In May 2022, Esclito modeled for Hot Summer, a body-positive beach photoshoot campaign. In March 2023, she walked the runway for the first time at Bench Fashion Week (BFW). Acer Batislaong of Nylon Manila reported that Esclito's catwalk debut "made the most impact" at the event, and that it became a trending topic online. In September, Esclito posed for Nylon Manila with Japanese-Filipino actress and model Kaori Oinuma. She walked the BFW runway again in the following year.

== Other ventures ==
=== Philanthropy ===
Esclito was started a donation drive for victims of Typhoon Rai (locally known as Typhoon Odette), which struck several provinces in the Philippines in 2021. In February 2022, she also participated in By Request 2, a 10-day online charity concert that raised funds for survivors of Rai.

=== Miscellaneous work ===
In 2020, Esclito participated in Rise Artist Studio's "Gaya Mo Ba 'To?" (Note: The title combines the common Tagalog expression "Kaya mo ba 'to?", literally meaning "Can you do this?" with the Tagalog word "gaya", meaning "to imitate".) challenge series on YouTube. She performed lines from iconic Star Cinema films, opting to translate them into her native language, Cebuano. On June 24, 2022, Esclito made her debut as a voice actress on "Click For You", an episode of the radio drama anthology Dear MOR: Celebrity Specials. She and Zach Castañeda voiced Cheska and Jerome, a real-life young couple whose love story began on the social media app TikTok.

She wrote the script for the music video of her 2023 song "Dalawang Isip", which doubled as a short film, and co-directed it with Karlo Calingao. In 2023 and 2024, she competed in the Star Magic All-Star Games, leading the volleyball squad Team Lady Spikers alongside Loisa Andalio. The sports event for Star Magic talents is held annually at the Araneta Coliseum and is digitally broadcast via video on demand (VOD). In 2024, Esclito was recognized as one of the volleyball game's Mythical Six, referring to the six best volleyball players of the event.

== Media image ==
=== Endorsements ===
In 2018, Esclito became an ambassador for the Philippine fashion brand Folded & Hung, as well as the Philippine branch of BYS Cosmetics, an Australian makeup brand. In their announcement of her ambassadorship, BYS described Esclito as "strong, confident, and definitely beautiful". In November 2021, she was featured in a Christmas campaign promoting Lady's Choice mayonnaise, in which celebrities shared their personal holiday macaroni recipes. Esclito honored her Visayan roots by sprinkling her macaroni salad with crushed peanut kisses, a delicacy native to her home province Bohol. She is also an endorser of GAOC Dental, and Coca-Cola Philippines.

=== Fashion ===
Esclito's beaded red gown at the 2019 ABS-CBN Ball caused controversy. The gown, which was designed by Dominique Dy, was meant to evoke "modern Filipiniana". However, on the day before the ball, the gown's heavy beads reportedly damaged its fabric and the designer was forced to redo the top part from scratch. As a result of the mishap, the gown was unfinished when Esclito attended the ball. Some publications listed Esclito's unfinished gown as one of the "worst" outfits that night.

In April 2023, Hannah Mallorca of The Philippine Daily Inquirer named Esclito one of the 10 best-dressed celebrities at ABS-CBN's inaugural Star Magic Prom. She declared Esclito to be the diamond of the night, a reference to Bridgerton, the popular TV series that inspired the event's theme.

== Personal life ==
In November 2018, Esclito first publicly opened up about suffering from depression. She stated that she initially refused to tell other people about her depression, but eventually sought support for her mental health. In October 2022, she discussed her mental health again. She shared her fears about her "wounded" inner child, stemming from her troubled childhood.

In October 2021, Esclito uploaded a since-deleted photo of herself with a heavy pink filter shortly after Leni Robredo announced that she would run for president in the 2022 Philippine presidential election. This was widely understood to signal support for Robredo's presidential bid. She has also expressed support for Black Lives Matter and Palestine.

Although the public knows Esclito by the name Vivoree, her friends and family call her Niña.

=== Relationships ===
In 2022, Esclito dated a man from outside the showbiz industry. On November 1, 2025, she confirmed her relationship with hiker Trei Altarejos.

== Discography ==
=== Albums ===
Year	Title	Remarks	Ref.
2019	CK & Vivoree	Collaboration	
2024	Movie Made For Me		

=== Singles ===
Year	Title	Details	Remarks	Ref
2016	Kaya Pa	Released: November 25, 2016; Label: Star Music; Formats: Digital Download	self-written song	
2019	May Tama Ka	Released: January 18, 2019; Label: StarPop; Formats: Digital Download	with Hashtags CK	
2020	Star Ng Pasko	Released: October 9, 2020; Label: StarPop; Formats: Digital Download	with Patrick Quiroz	
2022	Did You Let Me Go	Released: May 27, 2022; Label: Star Music; Formats: Compilation Album, Digital Download	He's Into Her Season 2 Official Soundtrack	
2022	Did I Let You Go	Released: May 27, 2022; Label: Star Music; Formats: Compilation Album, Digital Download	with Jon Guelas He's Into Her Season 2 Official Soundtrack	
2023	Matapang	Released: February 24, 2023; Label: Star Music; Formats: Single, Digital Download	from Extended Play Movie Made For Me	
2023	Dalawang Isip	Released: June 2, 2023; Label: Star Music; Formats: Single, Digital Download	from Extended Play Movie Made For Me	
2023	Sayaw ng mga Tala	Released: August 25, 2023; Label: Star Music; Formats: Single, Digital Download	w/ Benedix Ramos	
2023	Pasko ang Pinakamagandang Kwento - Extended Version	Released: December 16, 2023; Label: Star Music; Formats: Single, Digital Download	ABS-CBN Christmas Station ID 2023 All Star Version	
2024	IDLYLT	Released: August 2, 2024; Label: Star Music; Formats: Single, Digital Download	from Extended Play Movie Made For Me	
2024	Movie Made For Me	Released: August 2, 2024; Label: Star Music; Formats: Single, Digital Download	from Extended Play Movie Made For Me	

== Awards and nominations ==
Year	Award	Category	Nominated work	Result
2018	Village Pipol Choice Awards	Village Pipol's 2018 Cover of The Year		Won
2020	PBL Awards	PBL Awards Best Supporting Actress	Kookai Yambao of Hello Stranger (web series)	Nominated
2020	Myx Music Awards 2020	Myx Celebrity VJ of the Year (with Charles Kieron)		Nominated
2020	Your Face Sounds Familiar	Your Face Sounds Familiar Grand Winner		Nominated
2023	NYLON Manila Big Bold Brave Awards Night	Y.O.U Best Beauty Look		Won
2023	TAG Media Chicago	#TAG25Under25		Rank 22
2023	TAG Media Chicago	Most Promising Female Star		Nominated
2024	Village Pipol Choice Awards	TV Supporting Actress of the Year	Dara of Can't Buy Me Love	Won
2024	16th Star Awards for Music	New Female Recording Artist of the Year	Matapang	Nominated
2024	16th Star Awards for Music	Dance Recording of the Year	Matapang	Nominated
