= Love at First Stream =

Romance film directed by Cathy Garcia-Molina

- Theatrical release poster
- Directed by: Cathy Garcia-Molina
- Written by: Cathy Garcia-Molina; Kookai Labayen; Ella A. Palileo; Isabella Policarpio
- Produced by: Kriz G. Gazmen; Carlo L. Katigbak; Olivia M. Lamasan; Marivic B. Ong; Ella A. Palileo; Marizel Samson-Martinez
- Starring: Daniela Stranner; Kaori Oinuma; Jeremiah Lisbo; Anthony Jennings
- Cinematography: Dan Villegas
- Edited by: Marya Ignacio
- Production companies: ABS-CBN Film Productions; Hulu
- Distributed by: Star Cinema
- Release date: December 25, 2021
- Country: Philippines
- Language: Filipino

Love at First Stream is a 2021 romantic comedy film written by Cathy Garcia-Molina, Kookai Labayen, Ella A. Palileo, Isabella Policarpio and directed by Cathy Garcia-Molina. It stars Daniela Stranner, Kaori Oinuma, Jeremiah Lisbo and Anthony Jennings. The film is about the stories of a streamer, a student, a breadwinner, and a heartthrob as they explore love and friendships online to escape their realities offline. It is an official entry to the 47th Metro Manila Film Festival.

== Plot ==
Vilma “V” Ramirez (Daniela Stranner) is a spirited and tech-savvy teenager living in a cramped home with her single mom, Rosario (Agot Isidro), who works hard and runs a tight, traditional household. V feels stifled by her mother’s overprotectiveness and constant reminders of responsibility. Her only outlet is the online world, a place where she can express herself without judgment.

Her cousin and best friend, Megumi “Meg” Sakai (Kaori Oinuma), a sweet and practical nursing student, becomes her first collaborator. Meg recently moved in after her own family troubles, and the two girls form a strong sisterly bond. They live modestly, dreaming of a better life and hoping to stand out in a world of influencers.

Living next door is Christopher “Tupe” Rodriguez (Anthony Jennings), a hardworking, witty young man with a hidden crush on V. He juggles his studies and a part-time job as a food delivery driver for “ChixBoy” while helping his family. Tupe is grounded, humble, and extremely supportive, often helping V fix her tech gear or making her laugh when she's down.

V’s world changes when she meets Gino Bautista (Jeremiah Lisbo), a charming, upper-class classmate of Meg who has a huge online following. Gino is charismatic and confident, but also surprisingly down-to-earth. He sees potential in V and suggests they collaborate on a Live streaming show to help her gain traction. V is hesitant at first but eventually agrees, pulled in by the promise of popularity and success.

V, Gino, Meg, and Tupe launch an experimental series called “Love at First Stream”, a fake dating show where the lines between performance and reality begin to blur. Their chemistry draws a growing audience, and V becomes increasingly immersed in her online persona. She begins to prioritize views, likes, and comments over her real relationships.

One key scene shows them filming a flirty picnic episode in a park, with V and Gino pretending to be on a romantic date. As Tupe holds the camera, his face quietly falls, realizing his feelings for V may never be returned. V becomes consumed by her online identity and increasingly distant from Meg and Tupe. She starts clashing with her mom, who doesn’t understand the allure of being an “influencer.” Meanwhile, Meg struggles with feelings of invisibility and overwork, always the reliable friend but never the star.

Gino, despite his charm, begins to feel out of place with V’s growing obsession with perfection and control. He eventually admits to her that the version of herself she's projecting online isn’t who she really is. V, celebrating a milestone of 100,000 followers, orders a meal from “ChixBoy” to commemorate the occasion. When the delivery rider arrives, it’s Tupe. The air turns heavy. He hands her the food with a small, hurt smile. “Congratulations, V,” he says, before turning and walking away. V watches him go, realizing how far she’s drifted from the people who care about her.

When one of their livestreams goes wrong, an argument captured on-air, V’s audience turns on her. Negative comments flood in, and sponsors pull back. She spirals, locking herself in her room and deleting her app. Rosario, comforts her. She tells V that the world outside the screen is where real love, real pain, and real success happen. This leads to a moving reconciliation scene between mother and daughter, where Rosario admits her own fears of failing as a parent.

V apologizes to Meg and Tupe, admitting her mistakes. The trio reunites, not for clout, but to create something authentic, a final livestream not about perfection, but about their real lives and struggles. In the final stream, they openly share their journey, the good, the bad, and the lessons learned. V thanks Tupe for always being there. Tupe confesses his feelings in the chat. Viewers flood the comments with love and support. Gino joins the chat, too, smiling from afar.

The film ends with the group walking together, laughing in the sun, having returned to their offline lives. V no longer chases followers. Instead, she appreciates the messy, beautiful reality around her.

== Cast ==
- Daniela Stranner as Vilma "V" Ramirez
- Kaori Oinuma as Megumi Sakai
- Jeremiah Lisbo as Gino Bautista
- Anthony Jennings as Christopher "Tupe" Rodriguez
- Chico Alicaya as Yuan
- Amanda Zamora as Missy
- Agot Isidro as Rosario Ramirez
- Igi Boy Flores as Gabby Ramirez
- Pinky Amador as Lucy
- RJ Ladesma as Prof. Gomez
- Gail Banawis as Rica
- Quincy Adrienne Villanueva as Issa
- Ashley Polinar as one of the MisYu Top Gifter
- Vien Alen King as Love Guro
- Tonton Gutierrez as Dennis Ramirez
- Hyubs Azarcon as Pip Rodriguez
- Melissa Gibbs as Nora Rodriguez
- Prince Morales as Bobot
- Keagan De Jesus as Doods
- Jessica Dungo as one of the Kumu Streamer
- Liofer Pinatacan as one of the Zoom Classmates

== Production ==
Love at First Stream was produced under the collaboration of Star Cinema and streaming platform Kumu with Cathy Garcia-Molina as its director. The film tackles the theme of the role of social media in establishing and maintaining relationships; both platonic and romantic. Kumu itself is featured in the film. The film stars Daniela Stranner and Anthony Jennings, and Kaori Oinuma and Jeremiah Lisbo who are promoted as belonging to love teams. The pairing of Chico Alicaya and Amanda Zamora are marketed as a "guest love team".

Principal photography for Love at First Stream which began no earlier than July 2021 was hampered by the COVID-19 pandemic. Filming was disrupted due to shifting local government pandemic-related protocols as well as false-positive COVID-19 cases among the production team. In October, rainy weather posed difficulty in capturing day scenes for the film.

Rhys Miguel was originally cast to portray Gino. He was replaced by Lisbo, after Miguel backed out for personal reasons.

== Release ==
The film was released on December 25, 2021, as an official entry to 47th Metro Manila Film Festival.
