= Kaori Oinuma =

Filipino-Japanese actress (born 2000)

- 老沼 カオリ
- Born: Kaori Oinuma (Note: Kaori Oinuma was born in Japan. Thus, she does not possess her mother's maiden name which is Agapito.); July 22, 2000 (age 26); Nagoya, Japan
- Citizenship: Japanese, Filipino
- Education: Philippine Women's University (BA)
- Occupations: Actress; content creator
- Years active: 2018–present
- Musical career
- Genres: OPM; Pop
- Label: Star Pop

YouTube information
- Channel: Kaori Oinuma
- Genre: Vlogging
- Subscribers: 540 thousand
- Views: 8 million
- Last updated: April 18, 2025

Kaori Oinuma (老沼 カオリ, Oinuma Kaori; born July 22, 2000) is a Filipino-Japanese actress known for being a finalist in Philippine reality television series, Pinoy Big Brother: Otso. She is best known for her role as Michiko in the iWantTFC original series, He's Into Her (2021). She is also a part of the first batch of stars under Rise Artists Studio, a talent management arm of ABS-CBN Films.

== Early life and education ==
Oinuma was born on July 22, 2000, in Nagoya, Japan to a Filipino mother and a Japanese father. She lived in Japan until she was 4 years old before moving to the Philippines. She later grew up in Cabanatuan City, Nueva Ecija, where her family maintains a home. Oinuma has two half-siblings and a stepfather in the Philippines. When she was 13, her mother grabbed the opportunity of migrating to Japan with her after a friend of theirs, whose mom works in an agency, told them about the support offered to women who have half-Japanese children.

In high school, she became a varsity player of their school's basketball team. And during summer breaks, she worked on part-time jobs in order to help her mom with their finances.

In July 2023, she graduated from senior high school in Bartolome Sangalang National High School in Guimba, Nueva Ecija. Thereafter, she pursued college at Philippine Women's University taking up a degree in Psychology. She is one of Boy Abunda's scholars. She graduated from college in 2026.

== Career ==
=== 2018–2019: Pinoy Big Brother and Star Hunt ===
In 2018, Oinuma made her television debut when she joined the reality show, Pinoy Big Brother: Otso, where she placed eighth overall.

Before venturing into acting, she took part in the Star Hunt Academy Boot Camp (the exact program that created the now known P-pop groups, BINI and BGYO) but could not complete the training program.

=== 2019–2020: Acting Debut ===
In later part of 2019, Oinuma got her first television role as a cast in Parasite Island. A year later, she had some acting stints in Maalala Mo Kaya: Mata and television sitcom Home Sweetie Home Extra Sweet.

=== 2020: Rise Artist Studio Launch and First Lead Role ===
She was launched as one of the first batch of artists under Rise Artist Studio, in February 2020.

She subsequently starred in the adaptation of a Wattpad story, The Four Bad Boys And Me, portraying the lead character, Candice Gonzales. The series was co-starred by fellow PBB alumna Maymay Entrata and co-Rise Artists Rhys Miguel, Jeremiah Lisbo and Aljon Mendoza.

Another series, Love on Da Move, in which she was cast as Chacha, was set to air but was cancelled before any episodes were broadcast.

=== 2021–2023: Starring in Teen Series and Big Screen Debut ===
In May 2021, Oinuma portrayed Michiko Tarranza in the series He's Into Her, together with Belle Mariano and Donny Pangilinan.

On the same year, Oinuma played the role of Megumi in Love at First Stream, together with Lisbo, Daniela Stranner, and Anthony Jennings. The said movie was released in December 2021 as an official entry at the 2021 Metro Manila Film Festival.

During the "iWantTFC Unwrapped" event held in December 2021, it was announced that Oinuma had joined the cast of Tara, G! The iWant TFC original series premiered a year later in October 2022.

In early 2022, Oinuma reprised her role as Michiko Tarranza for the second season of He's Into Her.

In March 2023, it was announced that Oinuma will be starring in upcoming thriller drama series Fractured.

== Filmography ==
=== Film ===
Year	Title	Role	Ref.
2021	Love At First Stream	Megumi Sakai	
2023	School Year 2007^{a}	Cathy	
2023	A Very Good Girl	Rigel Abalos	
2025	Untold	Louise Amador	
2025	Romance Reboot	Kai	
2025	Meet, Greet & Bye	Jen	

Notes:
^ ^{a} One of the Southeast Asia short-film trilogy inspired by the songs of pop trio New Hope Club.

=== Television ===
Year	Title	Role	Notes	Ref.
2018–2019	Pinoy Big Brother: Otso	Herself	Contestant	
2019	Parasite Island	Lia Dimaano		
2020	Maalaala Mo Kaya	Luzel	Episode: "Mata"	
2020	Home Sweetie Home: Extra Sweet	Akiko		
2021	Paano Kita Mapasasalamatan?	Chier Ann/ Racquel/ Romina	Episode 36	
2021–2022	He's Into Her	Michiko Sil Tarranza		
2022	Tara, G!	Legarda "Legs" Cruz		
2023	Fractured	Yanni		
2023	Para Sa All	Jade	Episode: "Ang Toxic Mo Bes" (Under PIE (TV channel))	
2023	Para Sa All	Nancy Padilla	Episode: "Online si the One" (Under PIE (TV channel))	
2023	Para Sa All	Carla	Episode: "Fandoomed" (Under PIE (TV channel))	
2024	What's Wrong with Secretary Kim	Kim Marie Flores		
2024	Halfmates	Daniela "Dani" del Rosario		
2025	It's Okay To Not Be Okay	Gemmalyn Marie "Gemma" Bautista		
2026	Honor Thy Mother		Guest cast	
2026	True Manila Encounters	Ana	Episode 2: Occupant	

=== Digital ===
Year	Title	Type	Role	Ref.
2019	Hello, Outside World!	Docuseries	Herself	
2020	Listen to Love: The Four Bad Boys & Me	Hybrid Podcast	Candice Gonzales	
2020	Rise and Shine	Talk Show	Co-host	
2020	Happy Hallyu Day	K-Pop Virtual Event	Guest	
2021	He's Into Her: The Journey	Documentary	Herself	
2021-2022	We Rise Together	Talk show	Co-host	
2022	Anime Kitchen	Cooking show	Herself	
2023	Rise with You	Variety show	Co-host/ Performer	^{[OD-a]}
2023	Tatak Star Magic Celebrity Conversations	Sit-down Interview	Herself	
2023	Rise & Go	Travel show	Herself	^{[OD-a]}
2023	Ur Da Boss	Game show	Guest/ Contestant	^{[OD-b]}
2023	WatchaWin	Game show	Guest/ Contestant	^{[OD-b]}
2024	Star Magic Hot Summer 2024 Metamorphosis	Docuseries	Herself	
2024	TFC Stories of Home	Docuseries	Herself	
2025	Till Debt Do Us Part	Micro-series	Kristine Isidro	
2026	True Manila Encounters; Episode 2: Occupant	Horror Anthology	Ana	

Notes:
^^{OD-a} Rise Artists Studio contents.
^^{OD-b} Fractured promo guestings.

=== Music Videos/ Music Film ===
Year	Title	Artist	Label	Notes	Ref.
2021	No Stopping You (Vertical MV)	SB19	Star Music	Love at First Stream OST	
2022	Di Kita Iiwan (Visualizer Video)	Sam Milby	Star Music	He's Into Her S2 OST - MichiDale Scenes	
2022	Hatid	The Juans	Viva Records		
2022	Tara, G!	The Juans	Star Music	Tara, G! OST - w/ casts	
2022	Lumala o Mawala	JC Alcantara	Star Music		
2023	Happy You Stayed	Sab	Tarsier Records		
2023	Tadhana	Ace Banzuelo	Sony Music Philippines		
2023	Just Don't Know It Yet	New Hope Club	Universal Music Group		^{[MV-a]}
2024	HBD	Maki	Tarsier Records		
2024	Coming Home	Enzo Villegas		University ID - PWU	
2024	Hello My Love	Kim Won Shik	Universal Records (Philippines)		

Notes:
^^{MV-a} From the short film "School Year 2007", one of New Hope Club Southeast Asia short film trilogy.

== Other performances ==
Other Acting Performances
Year	Show	Title	Role	Format	Ref.
2022	Dear MOR Celebrity Special	First Kilig	Rizzy	Voice acting	
2022	The Juans Live in Araneta	Hatid	Kate	Live Stage acting	^{[OP-a]}

Concert Performances
Year	Event	Date	Ref.
2021	He's Into Her: The Benison Ball	August 6, 2021	
2022	HIH All Access	August 27, 2022	
2022	The Juans Live in Araneta	October 23, 2022	^{[OP-b]}

Notes:
^^{OP-a} Performed with JC Alcantara as part/ continuation of the music film of the song "Hatid".
^^{OP-b} As guest performer with the Tara, G! cast for the OST of the show with same title; and for the live stage acting with JC Alcantara.

== Discography ==
Year	Title	Label	Ref.
2022	Speed of Love	Star Music	
2022	Liwanag sa Dilim (All Star Version)		
2022	Tara, G! (Cast version)	Star Music	
2024	Heto Ako (OST - What's Wrong with Secretary Kim)	Star Music	

== Awards and nominations ==
Year	Award Ceremony	Category	Nominated work	Result	Ref.
2019	Push Awards	PUSH Newcomer	—N/a	Nominated	
2021	34th PMPC Star Awards for Television	Best New Female TV Personality	Maalaala Mo Kaya: Mata	Won	
2022	Nylon Manila Big, Bold, Brave Awards The Sequel	Favorite Ship - with Jeremiah Lisbo	—N/a	Nominated	
2022	38th PMPC Star Awards for Movie	Movie Love Team of the Year - with Jeremiah Lisbo	Love at First Stream	Nominated	
2023	4th Village Pipol Choice Award	TV Supporting Actress of the Year	He's Into Her (Season 2)	Won	
2023	TAG Media Chicago	#TAG25UNDER25	—N/a	Nominated	(Note: TAG25UNDER25 honors the Movers and Shakers of this Generation. Oinuma is included in the Top 100 Finalist as announced by TAG Media Chicago on April 15, 2023.)
2023	TAG Media Chicago	Most Promising Female Star	—N/a	Nominated	
2024	Anak TV Seal Awards	Net Makabata Star	—N/a	Nominated	
