= Jayda Avanzado =

Filipino actress and singer (born 2003)

- Born: Janelle Amanda Loyola Avanzado; June 1, 2003 (age 23); Philippines
- Occupations: Singer; actress
- Years active: 2017–present
- Agents: Star Magic (2021–2023); Cornerstone Entertainment (2017–2021); Rise Artists Studio (2021–2023); Viva Artists Agency (2025–present)
- Parents: Dingdong Avanzado (father); Jessa Zaragoza (mother)
- Relatives: Lloyd Zaragoza (uncle)
- Musical career
- Labels: Star Music (2018–2023); Republic Records Philippines (2023–present)

Janelle Amanda "Jayda" Loyola Avanzado (born June 1, 2003) is a Filipino actress and singer.

== Career ==
In December 2017, Avanzado signed up with Cornerstone Entertainment.

In June 2018, Avanzado released her debut EP, In My Room. On the same month, she also became a member of the teen pop group, ASAP G!, along with Darren Espanto, Ylona Garcia, Jeremy Glinoga, Kyle Echarri and Lala Vinzon.

In 2021, Avanzado left Cornerstone Entertainment after three years and joined Rise Artists Studio. During the same year, she signed a contract with Star Magic. Avanzado staged her first major digital concert, Jayda in Concert, on June 26, 2021. She also ventured into acting, making her debut in the television series Teen Clash on March 17, 2023, in the role of Zoe.

== Filmography ==
=== Television ===
Year	Title	Role	Notes	Source
2018–2020; 2021–2023; 2026–present	ASAP XP	Herself	Co-host / performer	
2020–2021	Sunday Noontime Live!	Herself	Co-host / performer	
2023	Teen Clash	Zoe David		
2026	Project LOKI	Lorelei Rios	Viva One live-action adaptation	

== Awards and nominations ==
Year	Award	Category	Work	Result	Source
2019	32nd Awit Awards	Best New Female Recording Artist		Won	
2022	13th PMPC Star Awards for Music	Female Pop Artist of the Year	Sana Tayo Na	Won	
