= Rise Artists Studio =

Talent agency in the Philippines

- Industry: Talent Agency; Music & Entertainment
- Founded: February 6, 2020; 6 years ago
- Headquarters: ABS-CBN Broadcasting Center, Diliman, Quezon City, Philippines
- Key people: Olivia Lamasan; Mico Del Rosario; Jennifer Ching; Patricia Rigodon
- Products: Music & Entertainment
- Services: Talent Management
- Owner: ABS-CBN Corporation
- Parent: ABS-CBN Films (in collaboration with Star Magic)
- Divisions: Rise iHub

Rise Artists Studio is a training and management subsidiary of ABS-CBN Films, in collaboration with Star Magic. It is responsible for scouting and developing aspiring artists, as well as maintaining the stardom of the artists it handles.

On February 6, 2020, Rise Artists Studio introduced the first batch of artists under its management, with 11 artists originally from Star Magic and two from Star Hunt.

== Current artists ==
=== Initial batch ===
From Star Magic

Name	Years active	Refs.
Anthony Jennings	February 2020 to present	
Belle Mariano	February 2020 to present	
Daniela Stranner	February 2020 to present	
Gillian Vicencio	February 2020 to present	
Jeremiah Lisbo	February 2020 to present	

From Star Hunt

Name	Years active	Refs.
Kaori Oinuma	Feb 2020–present	

=== Succeeding launch ===
Name	Years active	Refs.
JC Alcantara	Dec 2020 - present	
Bianca de Vera	Mar 2021–present	
Zach Castañeda	Mar 2021–present	
Shanaia Gomez	Mar 2021–present	
Aljon Mendoza	Mar 2021–present	(Note: From Star Hunt.)
Karina Bautista	Mar 2021–present	(Note: From Star Hunt.)
Gello Marquez	Nov 2021–present	
Esnyr Ranollo	Dec 2021–present	(Note: Ranollo is both an actor and a Tiktok content creator, hence, he is also a part of Rise iHub.)
L. A. Santos	May 2022–present	

== Former artists ==
Name	Years active	Notes	Ref.
Patrick Quiroz	2020–2021	Now under Cornerstone Entertainment and Sparkle GMA Artist Center	
Rhys Miguel	2020–2021	Now on Sparkle GMA Artist Center	
Arielle Roces	2020–2022		
CJ Salonga	2020–2023		
Charlie Dizon	2020–2023	Still under Star Magic	
Gigi de Lana	2020–2023		
Jayda Avanzado	2021–2023 (Note: Previously managed by Cornerstone Entertainment from 2017 to 2021.)	Now under Viva Artists Agency and Republic Records Philippines	
Markus Paterson	2020–2024	Still under Star Magic	
Vivoree Esclito	2020–2024	Still under Star Magic	

== Rise iHub ==
On September 9, 2021, Rise Artists Studio launched Rise iHub for content creators. It will feature collaborations of content creators to a diverse audience.

Name	Years active	Refs.
Jae Miranda	Sept 2021–present	
Kerwin King	Sept 2021–present	
Mela Habijan	Sept 2021–present	
River Joseph	2021–present	
Ivan De Guzman	Nov 2021–present	
Esnyr Ranollo	Dec 2021–present	
Aiyana Perlas	May 2022–present	
Jimmy Nocon	May 2022–present	
Gela Alonte	Feb 2023–present	
Chloe Webber	Aug 2023–present	
Bong Gonzales	Nov 2023-present	(Note: From queer dating reality show Sparks Camp, campers launched in Rise iHub in November 2023..)
Karl Bautista	Nov 2023-present	(Note: From queer dating reality show Sparks Camp, campers launched in Rise iHub in November 2023..)
Nat Magbitang	Nov 2023-present	(Note: From queer dating reality show Sparks Camp, campers launched in Rise iHub in November 2023..)
Red Ollero	Dec 2024	

== Rise Creatives ==
Directors under Rise Creatives:

- Dwein Baltazar
- Petersen Vargas
- Chad Vidanes
- Mae Cruz Alviar

== Shows and contents ==
Year	Show	Refs.
2020	Rise and Shine	
2020–2021	We Rise Together	
2022	Boys After Dark	
2022	Plate Twists	
2023	Rise with You	
2023	Rise and Go	

We Rise Together aired on Kapamilya Channel and Kapamilya Online Live under Yes Weekend! line up from May 30, 2021 to January 30, 2022, replacing Lucky ng Tulong and was replaced by Sunday Kapamilya Blockbusters. The show moved to Saturday from February 5 to April 2, 2022, replacing Uncoupling.

Boys After Dark is a video podcast with men of Rise Artist and RiseiHub, Markus Paterson, Anthony Jennings, Aljon Mendoza, Gello Marquez and Jae Miranda talking about lifestyle and relationships.

Plate Twists is a cooking show with Rise women Gillian Vicencio and Bianca de Vera, who cook and also talk about relationships and emotions.

Rise with You is a two-part episode variety show with song and dance performances, acting and games featuring Rise Artist Studio and Rise iHub talents, with the participation of some Kapamilya artists as guests. It premiered in iWantTFC on January 25, 2023, and was shown in Kapamilya Channel, Kapamilya Online Live and A2Z on February 25–26, 2023.

Rise and Go is a three-episode adventure show with Aljon Mendoza, Bianca De Vera, Gello Marquez, Jae Miranda, Kaori Oinuma and Karina Bautista. The group went for a boat ride and day camping at Mapanuepe Lake in Zambales. They also visited different restaurants and theme parks, such as Zoocobia and Aqua Planet Waterpark in Pampanga.

== See also ==
- Star Magic
- Sparkle GMA Artist Center
- MQ Artists Agency
- Viva Artists Agency
