= Jeremiah Lisbo =

Filipino actor, model and dancer

- Born: Jeremiah Jordan Romano Lisbo; November 27, 1998 (age 27); Metro Manila, Philippines
- Education: Far Eastern University (BS)
- Occupations: Actor; model
- Years active: 2019–present
- Agents: Star Magic (2019–present); Rise Artists Studio (2020–present)
- Known for: Randall Echavez in He's Into Her
- Height: 6 ft 0 in (183 cm)

Jeremiah Jordan Romano Lisbo (born November 27, 1998), is a Filipino actor, singer and model. He is most known for appearing in a number of Star Cinema's produced films, including Four Sisters Before the Wedding (2020), Love or Money (2021), He's Into Her (2021), and Love at First Stream (2021).

Lisbo is among the first batch of actors signed under Rise Artists Studio, a newly created talent management arm of Star Cinema.

== Early life and education ==
Lisbo studied high school in Maria Montessori Holy Christian School. He went to Far Eastern University for college where he finished a degree in Hotel and Restaurant Management.

Prior to being an actor, Lisbo debuted as a commercial model for McDonald's burger ad in 2018.

It was also in 2018 when Lisbo had his stint in fashion modeling, as he walks in the runway of Bench Fashion Week. He also joins the Make Me A Zalora Model Cycle 3 where he emerged as a winner, and earned himself a contract to be the Face of Zalora in 2019.

== Career ==
Lisbo was signed to Star Magic as part of the Star Magic Circle 2019 batch, alongside fifteen other actors, including Belle Mariano and Kyle Echarri. The following year Lisbo made his television debut in the teleserye Make It with You (2020), which starred Enrique Gil and Liza Soberano.

In February 2020, Lisbo was among thirteen young actors selected to be a part of the Rise Artists Studio, a new talent agency developed under Star Cinema. Following this, Lisbo appeared in a number of Star Cinema productions, including the series The Four Bad Boys and Me, where he starred with his fellow Rise Artists Studio actors Kaori Oinuma and Rhys Miguel. Released amidst the COVID-19 pandemic and ABS-CBN shutdown, the show was Star Cinema's first ever digital project and took the form of a hybrid podcast/video series.

In the same year, Lisbo made his film debut in the Mae Cruz-Alviar film Four Sisters Before the Wedding (2020), a prequel to the 2013 film Four Sisters and a Wedding, where he played JP, the love interest of Belle Mariano's character. Lisbo was paired with Mariano once more in Maalaala Mo Kaya's episode "Singsing", which was released the following year.

In 2021, Lisbo appeared in another Cruz-Alviar film, Love or Money. The actor also starred in the iWantTFC series He's Into Her (2021), where he played Randall Echavez. As in his previous works, he was again paired with Mariano, but this time as part of a love triangle with Donny Pangilinan's character. The series, which was based on a popular Wattpad novel, debuted to a record-breaking viewership.

== Filmography ==
Film
Year	Title	Role	Ref.
2020	Four Sisters Before the Wedding	JP	
2021	Love or Money	Patrick	
2021	Love is Color Blind	Sky	
2021	Love at First Stream	Gino	
2025	My Love Will Make You Disappear	Carlo	

Television Shows & Digital Series
Year	Title	Role	Notes	Ref.
2020	Make It with You	Xian Isla		
2021	Maalaala Mo Kaya	Young Jamwell	Episode: "Singsing"	
2021	Maalaala Mo Kaya	Ralph Malibunas	Episode: "Brush"	
2021–2022	He's Into Her	Randall "RJ" Echavez	Season 1 and 2	
2023	Unbreak My Heart	Franco		
2023	Family Feud	Contestant	w/ the cast of Unbreak My Heart	(Note: Promo guestings for Unbreak My Heart.)
2023	TiktoClock	Contestant	w/ Bianca De Vera	(Note: Promo guestings for Unbreak My Heart.)
2023	Ur Da Boss	Guest / Contestant	Aug. 14 episode	
2023	Fractured	Ron	Eps. 1–6	
2023	I Can See Your Voice	Himself	with the cast of Fractured	(Note: Promo guestings for Fractured.)
2023	Ur Da Boss	Guest/ Contestant	with the cast of Fractured	(Note: Promo guestings for Fractured.)
2023	WatchaWin	Guest/ Contestant	w/ Kaori Oinuma	(Note: Promo guestings for Fractured.)
2024	Pamilya Sagrado	John Kelvin Velasco		
2024	Rainbow Rumble	Guest/ Contestant	with the cast of Pamilya Sagrado	
2024	Gud Morning Kapatid	Guest	w/ Kaori Oinuma	(Note: Promo guestings for Halfmates.)
2024	Halfmates	James Florendo	w/ Kaori Oinuma	
2024	Saving Grace	young Antonio Sarmiento	cameo/ special participation	
2025	Sins of the Father	Luke Delgado		
2026	Roja	Dr. Ivan Ledesma		

Other Web & Online Shows
Year	Title	Role	Ref.
2020	The Four Bad Boys and Me	Marky Lim	
2021	He's Into Her: The Journey	Himself	
2021–2022	We Rise Together	Co-host	
2023	Rise With You	Co-host/ Performer	
2023	BRGY	Guest	
2023	Unbreak My Heart Europe Experience	Himself	
2024	Highschool Section Wars	Jared/ Cham-cham	
2024	Tao Po!	Himself	
2024	BRGY	Himself	

Music Video Appearance
Year	Song	Artist	Label	Ref.
2021	Soft Hearts	Sab	Star Music	
2021	No Stopping You (Vertical MV)	SB19	Star Music	
2022	Ayoko Lang	Angelina Cruz	Universal Records	
2022	Lumala o Mawala	JC Alcantara	Star Music	
2023	Tadhana	Ace Banzuelo	Sony Music Philippines	
2025	Hinihiling	Zsa Zsa Padilla	Star Music	
2026	Ano Ba Yan Pu*yeta	John Arcilla	Star Music	

Commercial/ Endorsement
Year	Brand	Product	Promo
2018	McDonald's	Burger	Bes or Bae? #NewLoveatMcdo
2018	Swiss Miss	Chocolate Drink	Just Because It Makes You Happy
