= Belle Mariano =

Filipino actress and singer

- Born: Belinda Angelito Mariano; June 10, 2002 (age 24); Pasig, Metro Manila, Philippines
- Occupations: Actress; singer
- Years active: 2012–present
- Agent(s): Star Magic (2012–present); Rise Artists Studio (2020–present)
- Musical career
- Genre: OPM
- Years active: 2021–present
- Label: Star Pop (2021–present)

YouTube information
- Channel: Belle Mariano
- Years active: 2022–present
- Genres: Lifestyle; Vlogging
- Subscribers: 346,000
- Views: 5.3 million
- Last updated: April 9, 2026

Belinda "Belle" Angelito Mariano (born June 10, 2002) is a Filipino actress and singer. She began appearing on television at the age of nine playing supporting roles and starring in the comedy-themed show Goin' Bulilit (2012–2015). Mariano then starred in the film Four Sisters Before the Wedding (2020) and the television series He's Into Her (2021–2022) and Can't Buy Me Love (2023–2024).

== Early life and education ==
Belinda Angelito Mariano was born on June 10, 2002, to Michael and Katrina Mariano. She studied elementary at St. Paul College, Pasig, and finished her junior high school at Divine Angels Montessori of Cainta, Inc., and senior high school at Homeschool Global. She is the eldest of five children. Her family lives in Pasig.

== Career ==
=== 2012–2018: Career beginnings, Lorenzo's Time, and Goin' Bulilit ===
Mariano started out by appearing in television commercials at the age of nine. She then made her début as an actress when she appeared in Lorenzo's Time in 2012, a television series starring Zaijian Jaranilla. After that, she began appearing on various TV programs such as Maalaala Mo Kaya in an episode entitled Kabibe (2012), and Princess and I (2012) where she played the role of Young Bianca Maghirang played by Bianca Casado. She was also a cast member in the youth-oriented show Goin' Bulilit.

In 2013, she appeared in Juan dela Cruz, Muling Buksan Ang Puso, and Maria Mercedes. In all of these series, Mariano played younger versions of all of the main characters. Mariano then starred in the television series FPJ's Ang Probinsyano from 2015 to 2016, portraying the role of Rachel Tuazon, the sister of Arjo Atayde's character.

In 2015, she graduated in Goin Bulilit alongside fellow Bulilits Carl and Miguel.

In 2017, Mariano reunited with her Lorenzo's Time co-star Zaijian Jaranilla and paired up together for a Maalaala Mo Kaya episode, Cellphone. In the same year, she also appeared in the films Can't Help Falling In Love starring Kathryn Bernardo and Daniel Padilla as Bernardo's sister Grace Dela Cuesta, and Love You To The Stars and Back starring Julia Barretto and Joshua Garcia as Ronnabel.

In 2018, she made appearances in the television series Bagani (which stars Liza Soberano and Enrique Gil) as the young Gloria (Dimples Romana) as well as a cameo appearance in Playhouse starring Zanjoe Marudo and Angelica Panganiban.

=== 2019–2020: Star Magic Circle, Four Sisters Before The Wedding, and "DonBelle" partnership ===
In 2019, she was part of the year's batch of artists launched in the Star Magic Circle together with Kyle Echarri, Melizza Jimenez, Sophie Reyes, Jeremiah Lisbo, Gillian Vicencio, Arielle Roces, Arabella del Rosario, Anthony Jennings, JC Alcantara, Glen Vargas, Kendru Garcia, Eisel Serrano, RA Lewis, Javi Benitez, and Aiyana Waggoner. In the same year, she appeared in the Bugoy Cariño-starrer film Danztep by Errol Ropero and in the hit series Kadenang Ginto as Catherine V. Herrera, the daughter of Leon, Richard Yap’s character in the series, as well as the Maalaala Mo Kaya episode Pregnancy Test. She also joined the Asia's songbird Regine Velasquez-Alcasid in the film Yours Truly, Shirley under Cinema One.

In November the same year, it was announced that Mariano will be teaming up with Donny Pangilinan for He's Into Her, an iWantTFC original series directed by Chad Vidanes that is based on the 2013 Wattpad novel of the same name by Maxine Lat a.k.a. Maxinejiji.

In 2020, she was among the first batch of artists from Star Magic to be handled by ABS-CBN Film's new talent management arm, Rise Artists Studio.

She had a cameo appearance in the film James and Pat and Dave (sequel to Vince and Kath and James) starring Ronnie Alonte, Loisa Andalio, and Donny Pangilinan. She played the role Trish, hinting the future romance with Dave, Pangilinan's character in the film and previewing her love team partnership with him as DonBelle. For their project He's Into Her, the production was postponed due to the COVID-19 pandemic, the ABS-CBN shutdown and the denial of franchise renewal.

In the same year, Mariano landed the role of the iconic Gabbie Salazar (previously played by Shaina Magdayao) and starred the prequel of the 2013 hit Four Sisters and a Wedding, 2020 film Four Sisters Before the Wedding. She was joined by actresses Alexa Ilacad, Charlie Dizon, and Gillian Vicencio as the newest Salazar sisters. The film became the No.1 top trending film as it arrived on Netflix Philippines and No.3 on Netflix Canada and UAE.

=== 2021–present: He's Into Her, Daylight, and future projects ===
In 2021, the long-awaited series He's Into Her had its record-breaking launch as it crashed the streaming platform iWant TFC upon its release due to the surge of the number of viewers who wanted to watch the premiere episode. The series was marked a huge success as it continuously trended all-throughout its run, and also helped the iWantTFC app to top all free entertainment apps in the country. It was also the number one most watched series on the streaming platform.

Following the series' success, the cast headlined a special online concert, He's Into Her: The Benison Ball for the fans to enjoy through the streaming platform KTX.ph. VIP tickets for the show became sold out after only three days since release. At the end of show, it was announced that a second season of the show will take place. Shortly after the successful concert, ABS-CBN Entertainment also unveiled He's Into Her: The Journey, a documentary about the making of the series. It showed the production of the show from the conceptualization, auditions, and the lock-in tapings. With the series' production passing to two years, the documentary also showed the hardship of the entire team and how they managed to push through the show even during a global pandemic and after the ABS-CBN shutdown.

In the same year, Mariano also made her mark in the music scene. She released her debut song Kung Ako Nalang for the special compilation album, Kumu Summer Album under Believe Music (on behalf of Nickl Entertainment). Shortly after, she released her debut single Sigurado under Star Music which was also included in the sound track of her series He's Into Her. As of May 2022, the single already garnered over 16M streams on Spotify and 7.5M views on YouTube.

Following the successful He's Into Her, the DonBelle love team landed their first ever lead movie under Star Cinema, romantic-comedy film Love Is Color Blind. The casts include their He's Into Her co-star Jeremiah Lisbo, as well as singer-actress Angelina Cruz, and TikTok contributor Esnyr Ranollo. It premiered through the streaming platform KTX.ph and Smart's GigaPlay app. Shortly after coming to Netflix, the film ranked atop the streaming service's trending lists in the Philippines.

She also released her debut album Daylight under Star Music as well as music video for lead single, Tanging Dahilan. She also released a visualizer video for For Your Eyes Only, music video for Rise and performance video for Nights of December. Her track For Your Eyes Only also became the OST for her movie Love Is Color Blind, marking her second song to be featured as a soundtrack.

She was also one of the artists to take part in ABS-CBN's 2021 Christmas Station ID, Andito Tayo Para Sa Isa't Isa along with Donny Pangilinan, Martin Nievera, Piolo Pascual, Gary Valenciano, Zsazsa Padilla, Erik Santos, KZ Tandingan, Kathryn Bernardo, Daniel Padilla, Sarah Geronimo, Sharon Cuneta, Vice Ganda, Regine Velasquez, Ogie Alcasid, Iñigo Pascual, Andrea Brillantes, Seth Fedelin, BGYO, and Darren Espanto.

In 2022, she opened the year through her successful concert Daylight: A Belle Mariano Digital Concert which was streamed via KTX.ph. Her first-ever solo concert reportedly sold over P300,000 worth of tickets in just two minutes after selling and reached over P500,000 in 30 minutes. SVIP and VIP tickets were also sold out. Her guest performers for the concert include Kyle Echarri, Ben&Ben, singer-songwriters Jayda Avanzado, SAB (Sabine Cerrado), Trisha Denise, and her love team partner Donny Pangilinan.

As her first acting project of the year, she starred in the third season of iWant TFC's original anthology series, Click, Like Share for the episode Swap with former Pinoy Big Brother housemate and fellow Rise artist Shanaia Gomez.

After starting taping and production in February, the most-awaited second season of He's Into Her officially premiered on April the same year. Upon release of the pilot episode, the series immediately became a trending topic in the Philippines. Together with the series, its soundtrack album was also released. Kahit Na, Kahit Pa, a song by Mariano was among the songs in the album, it peaked #1 on the top 10 songs on iTunes Philippines.

Apart from this, the Movie Cut of the first season of He's Into Her premiered at the Drive-In Cinema One: A Drive-Thru Movie Experience, in partnership with Ayala Malls Vertis North and Vertis North Estate.

In August, Star Magic toured in the United States as part of their 30th anniversary celebration. Mariano was among those who staged the shows. The artists first performed in the Newport Performing Arts Theater, Resorts World Manila, followed by the US shows in Kings Theater, Brooklyn, The Warfield, San Francisco, and in the Saban Theatre, Beverly Hills.

In September the same year, Mariano made history as the First-ever Filipina recipient of the Outstanding Asian Star award at the Seoul International Drama Awards. Among 175 actors and actresses from all over Asia, only 5 received the award. The other winners included Yusei Yagi from Japan, Alice Ko from Taiwan, Wallace Chung from China, and Krit Amnuaydechkorn from Thailand. She personally attended the 17th Seoul International Drama Awards that was held on the 22nd at the KBS Hall in Seoul, graced the red carpet event, and shared the stage with K-pop star Kang Daniel, and Japanese actor and singer Yusei Yagi as she received her award and said her acceptance speech.

Mariano won the Listeners’ Choice Award at the inaugural Billboard Philippines Women In Music in March 22 and announced the July 5 release of her sophomore album "Believe", as sequel to "Daylight". Earlier she released extended play "And Solemn" on January 27. Her joint single with Ben&Ben, “Autumn,” was released in December 2023, with a music video.

Mariano launched her makeup brand Talee with her sister Daniela in November 2025.

== Filmography ==
=== Film ===
Year	Title	Role	Ref.
2013	Rekorder	Leica	
2017	Can't Help Falling In Love	Grace Dela Cuesta	
2017	Love You To The Stars and Back	Ronnabel	
2019	Danztep	—N/a	
2019	Yours Truly, Shirley	Trixie Mae Caballero	
2020	James and Pat and Dave	Trish	
2020	Four Sisters Before the Wedding	Gabriella Sophia "Gabbie" Salazar	
2021	He's Into Her: The Movie Cut Part 1	Maxpein Zin "Taguro" Del Valle Luna	
2021	He's Into Her: The Movie Cut Part 2	Maxpein Zin "Taguro" Del Valle Luna	
2021	Love is Color Blind	Caramel "Cara" Arevalo	
2022	He's Into Her: The Movie Cut	Maxpein Zin "Taguro" Del Valle Luna	
2022	An Inconvenient Love	Ayef	
2023	Huling Sayaw	Stephanie	
2025	Meet, Greet & Bye	Geri Anne Facundo	
2026	Tayo sa Wakas	Cheska Alegre	
2027	Adora †	Adora	

=== Television ===
Year	Title	Role	Refs.
2012–2015	Goin' Bulilit	Herself	
2012	Princess and I	young Bianca	
2012	Lorenzo's Time	Charity "Charie" Gonzales, young Kat-Kat Gonzales	
2012	Maalaala Mo Kaya: Kabibe	young Elisa	
2013	Maalaala Mo Kaya: Hair Clip	young Charity Pangilinan, young Carlita Lolo	
2013	Muling Buksan ang Puso	young Sarah	
2013	Maalaala Mo Kaya: Pasa	young Blythe	
2013	Maria Mercedes	young Rosario	
2013	Maalaala Mo Kaya: Cake	young Nene	
2013	Wansapanataym: Give Gloves on Christmas Day	Leklek	
2013	Juan dela Cruz	young Mira	
2014	Maalaala Mo Kaya: Pagkain	young Iza Calzado	
2014	Hawak Kamay	Cherry Villaluz	
2015	Maalaala Mo Kaya: Sapatos	young Cecile	
2015	Nathaniel	young Rachel	
2015	On the Wings of Love	young Tiffany	
2015	You're My Home	young Grace	
2015–2016	FPJ's Ang Probinsyano	Rachel Tuazon	
2016	Maalaala Mo Kaya: Toothbrush	young Leni	
2016	Pasión de Amor	young Norma	
2017	Maalaala Mo Kaya: Cellphone	young Sandra	
2017	Maalaala Mo Kaya: Tulay	young Cecille	
2017	La Luna Sangre	Jan-Jan	
2018	Bagani	young Gloria	
2018	Maalaala Mo Kaya: Kalabaw	young Lerma	
2018	Playhouse	Janice Lopez	
2019	Maalaala Mo Kaya: Pregnancy Test	young Dudz	
2019	Kadenang Ginto	Catherine V. Herrera	
2021	Maalaala Mo Kaya: Singsing	young Vagelyn	
2021	He's Into Her	Maxpein Zin "Taguro" Del Valle Luna	
2021–present	ASAP XP	Herself, Performer, Host (2026-present)	
2022	Click, Like, Share: Swap	Jessie	
2022	He's Into Her: Season 2	Maxpein Zin "Taguro" Del Valle Luna	
2022	25 Questions: He's Into Her Season 2	Herself	
2023–2024	Can't Buy Me Love	Caroline Tiu	
2024	How to Spot a Red Flag	Maria Czarina "Cha" Theresa Fontanilla	
2025	Incognito	Takako Rai	

=== Concerts ===
==== Offline ====
Year	Title	Tour	Venue	Producer	Note/s	Ref.
2022	He's Into Her: All Access	—N/a	Araneta Center	ABS-CBN, iWantTFC, Star Cinema	He's Into Her Grand Finale Concert	
2022	Star Magic 30: Beyond The Stars (Los Angeles Show)	Star Magic 30th Anniversary Tour	Saban Theatre, Beverly Hills	iWantTFC, TFC, Star Magic	In celebration of Star Magic's 30th anniversary.	
2022	Star Magic 30: Beyond The Stars (San Francisco Show)	Star Magic 30th Anniversary Tour	The Warfield, San Francisco	iWantTFC, TFC, Star Magic	In celebration of Star Magic's 30th anniversary.	
2022	Star Magic 30: Beyond The Stars (New York Show)	Star Magic 30th Anniversary Tour	Kings Theater, Brooklyn	iWantTFC, TFC, Star Magic	In celebration of Star Magic's 30th anniversary.	
2022	Star Magic 30: Beyond The Stars (Manila Show)	Star Magic 30th Anniversary Tour	Newport Performing Arts Theater, Resorts World Manila	iWantTFC, TFC, Star Magic	In celebration of Star Magic's 30th anniversary.	

==== Online ====
Year	Title	Event Host	Ref
2022	Daylight: A Belle Mariano Digital Concert	Star Music	
2021	He's Into Her: The Benison Ball	Star Music	

=== Documentary ===
Year	Title	Role	Ref.
2022	Donny and Belle: Their Moment	Herself	
2022	All Time HIH: The Road to He's Into Her Season 2	Herself	
2021	He's Into Her: The Journey	Herself	

=== Music videos ===
Year	Title	Performed by	Director	Label	Notes	Ref.
2022	Pinadama	Zack Tabudlo	Shai Advincula-Antonio	Republic Records Philippines	—N/a	
2022		Tayo Ang Ligaya ng Isa’t Isa	Belle Mariano, Donny Pangilinan, Alexa Ilacad, KD Estrada, Jane de Leon, Janella Salvador, Joshua Garcia, Daniel Padilla, Kathryn Bernardo, Ogie Alcasid, Anne Curtis, Kim Chiu, Martin Nievera, Zsa Zsa Padilla, Sarah Geronimo, Gary Valenciano, Regine Velasquez-Alcasid, Jolina Magdangal, Melai Cantiveros, AC Bonifacio, Andrea Brillantes, Seth Fedelin, Francine Diaz, Darren Espanto, Kyle Echarri, Jed Madela, Klarisse de Guzman, Morissette, Angeline Quinto, Erik Santos, KZ Tandingan, Elha Nympha, Khimo Gumatay, Anji Salvacion, Bailey May, Piolo Pascual, Chito Miranda, Moira dela Torre, Sharon Cuneta and the DYCI Dagalak Choir	Paolo Ramos	Star Music	ABS-CBN Christmas Station ID 2022
2022	Kahit Na, Kahit Pa (Visualizer)	Belle Mariano	Edrex Clyde Sanchez	—N/a	Star Music	
2022	Kahit Na, Kahit Pa (Performance Video)	Belle Mariano	Edrex Clyde Sanchez	—N/a	Star Music	
2022	Kahit Na, Kahit Pa	Belle Mariano	Edrex Clyde Sanchez	—N/a	Star Music	
2022	Closer	Belle Mariano	—N/a	In collaboration with Close Up	Star Music	
2022	Rainy Days (Performance Video)	Belle Mariano	—N/a	—N/a	Star Music	
2022	With You (Performance Video)	Belle Mariano	—N/a	—N/a	Star Music	
2022	Nights of December (Performance Video)	Belle Mariano	Amiel Kirby Balagtas	—N/a	Star Music	
2022	Rise	Belle Mariano	Amiel Kirby Balagtas	—N/a	Star Music	
2022	For Your Eyes Only (Visualizer)	Belle Mariano	—N/a	—N/a	Star Music	
2021	Andito Tayo Para Sa Isa’t Isa	Belle Mariano, Donny Pangilinan, Martin Nievera, Piolo Pascual, Gary Valenciano, Zsazsa Padilla, Erik Santos, KZ Tandingan, Kathryn Bernardo, Daniel Padilla, Sarah Geronimo, Sharon Cuneta, Vice Ganda, Regine Velasquez, Ogie Alcasid, Iñigo Pascual, Andrea Brillantes, Seth Fedelin, BGYO, and Darren Espanto.	—N/a	ABS-CBN Christmas Station ID 2021	Star Music	
2021	Tanging Dahilan	Belle Mariano	Amiel Kirby Balagtas	—N/a	Star Music	
2021	Sigurado	Belle Mariano	Amiel Kirby Balagtas	—N/a	Star Music	
2021	Upuan	Ben&Ben	Niq Ablao	Sony Music Philippines	—N/a	
2021	Kung Ako Nalang	Belle Mariano	—N/a	Believe Music (on behalf of Nickl Entertainment)	—N/a	
2020	Maligaya Ang Buhay Ko	Iñigo Pascual	—N/a	Star Music	Special Christmas Video, Four Sisters Before The Wedding OST	
2019	Miss	Martin Venegas	Kennjin Gwayne Alojipan, Alfie Ramos Peregrino	Star Music	—N/a	

== Discography ==
=== Singles ===
Year	Title	Performed by	Label
2023	Wala Nang Iba	Belle Mariano, December Avenue	
2022	Kahit Na, Kahit Pa	Belle Mariano	Star Music
2022	Closer	Belle Mariano	Star Music
2021	For Your Eyes Only - From "Love Is Color Blind"	Belle Mariano	Star Music
2021	Sigurado (Duet Version)	Belle Mariano, Donny Pangilinan	Star Music
2021	Sigurado	Belle Mariano	Star Music

=== Albums ===
==== Extended plays ====
Year	Album	Song title	Performed by	Label
2021	Daylight	Sigurado	Belle Mariano	Star Music
2021	Daylight	With You	Belle Mariano	Star Music
2021	Daylight	Rainy Days	Belle Mariano	Star Music
2021	Daylight	Tanging Dahilan	Belle Mariano	Star Music
2021	Daylight	For Your Eyes Only	Belle Mariano	Star Music
2021	Daylight	Nights Of December	Belle Mariano	Star Music
2021	Daylight	Rise	Belle Mariano	Star Music
2023	Somber	Roadtrip	Belle Mariano	Star Music
2023	Somber	Session Road	Belle Mariano	Star Music
2023	Somber	Pansamantala	Belle Mariano	Star Music
2023	Somber	Running Out of Time	Belle Mariano	Star Music
2023	Somber	Bugambilya	Belle Mariano	Star Music
2023	Somber	Somber and Solemn	Belle Mariano	Star Music

=== Appearances ===
==== Compilation albums ====
Year	Title	Album	Performed by	Label
2022	Kahit Na, Kahit Pa	He's Into Her Season 2 (Original Soundtrack)	Belle Mariano	Star Music
2021	For Your Eyes Only - From "Love Is Colorblind"	Love Is Color Blind (Original Soundtrack)	Belle Mariano	Star Music
2021	Kung Ako Nalang	Kumu Summer Album	Belle Mariano	Believe Music (on behalf of Nickl Entertainment)

==== Original soundtracks ====
Year	Title	Show	Performed by	Label
2025	Why Me	It's Okay to Not Be Okay	Belle Mariano	Star Music
2022	Kahit Na, Kahit Pa	He's Into Her: Season 2	Belle Mariano	Star Music
2021	For Your Eyes Only - From "Love Is Colorblind"	Love Is Color Blind	Belle Mariano	Star Music
2021	Sigurado	He's Into Her	Belle Mariano	Star Music

==== Station ID ====
Year	Title	Label
2022	Tayo Ang Ligaya ng Isa’t Isa	ABS-CBN, Star Music
2021	Andito Tayo Para Sa Isa’t Isa	ABS-CBN, Star Music

== Awards and nominations ==
=== Film and television ===
Year	Award Ceremony	Category	Nominated work	Result	Ref.
2022	RAWR Awards 2022	Fan Club of the Year (shared with Donny Pangilinan)	—N/a	Won	
2022	RAWR Awards 2022	Love Team of the Year (shared with Donny Pangilinan)	—N/a	Won	
2022	RAWR Awards 2022	Favorite Bida (shared with Donny Pangilinan)	He's Into Her	Nominated	
2022	Gawad PASADO	PinakaPASADOng Aktres	Love is Color Blind	Pending	
2022	Seoul International Drama Awards	Outstanding Asian Star	—N/a	Won	
2022	VP Choice Awards 2021	Movie Actress of the Year	Love is Color Blind	Won	
2022	VP Choice Awards 2021	Female Promising Star of the Year	—N/a	Won	
2022	VP Choice Awards 2021	Love Team of the Year (shared with Donny Pangilinan)	—N/a	Won	
2022	VP Choice Awards 2021	Fandom of the Year (shared with Donny Pangilinan)	—N/a	Won	
2022	7th Push Awards	Push Popular Love Team of the Year (shared with Donny Pangilinan)	—N/a	Won	
2021	RAWR Awards 2021	Loveteam of the Year (shared with Donny Pangilinan)	—N/a	Won	
2021	RAWR Awards 2021	Breakthrough Artist of the Year (shared with Donny Pangilinan)	—N/a	Won	
2021	RAWR Awards 2021	Love Team of the Year (shared with Donny Pangilinan)	—N/a	Won	
2021	Asian Academy Creative Awards	Best Dressed Award	—N/a	Won	
2021	Tag Awards Chicago	Best Love Team (shared with Donny Pangilinan)	—N/a	Won	
2020	VP Choice Awards 2020	Most Promising Female Star	—N/a	Nominated	

=== Music ===
Year	Award Ceremony	Category	Nominated work	Result	Ref.
2022	7th PPOP Awards	PPOP New Female Artist of the Year	—N/a	Won	
2022	35th Awit Awards	Breakthrough Artist	—N/a	Won	
2022	35th Awit Awards	Favorite Female Artist	—N/a	Nominated	
2022	35th Awit Awards	Favorite Song	Sigurado	Won	
2021	7th Wish Music Awards	Wish Pop Song of the Year	Sigurado	Nominated	

=== Listicles ===
Year	Publisher	Listicle	Placement	Ref.
2022	Preview	50 Most Influential	Included	
