= He's Into Her =

2021–22 Philippine television teen romantic comedy drama series

- Season 1 title card
- Genre: Romantic comedy; Teen drama; Coming-of-age
- Based on: He's into Her by Maxinejiji
- Written by: Charisse Bayona; Dip Mariposque; Rigel Gelito
- Directed by: Chad Vidanes
- Starring: Donny Pangilinan; Belle Mariano; Kaori Oinuma; Jeremiah Lisbo; Vivoree Esclito; Joao Constancia; Criza Taa; Ashley del Mundo; Gello Marquez; Dalia Varde; Limer Veloso; Rajo Serrano; Mikha Lim; Turs Daza
- Music by: Francis Concio
- Opening theme: "He's Into Her" by BGYO
- Ending theme: "Best Time" by BGYO
- Country of origin: Philippines
- Original languages: Filipino; English
- No. of seasons: 2
- No. of episodes: 26

Production
- Executive producers: Carlo Katigbak; Cory Vidanes; Olivia Lamasan; Jaime Lopez; Ginny Monteagudo-Ocampo
- Producers: Kara Kintanar; Vanessa Valdez; Marizel Samson-Martinez
- Production locations: Brent International School, Biñan, Laguna
- Editor: Renard Torres
- Camera setup: Single-camera
- Running time: 35–90 minutes
- Production company: Star Cinema

Original release
- Network: iWantTFC; Kapamilya Channel; A2Z
- Release: May 28, 2021 – August 3, 2022

He's Into Her is a Philippine teen romantic comedy television series based on the 2012 novel of the same name by Maxinejiji (Maxine Lat Calibuso), starring Donny Pangilinan and Belle Mariano. The series released on iWantTFC from May 28, 2021 to August 3, 2022. The first season premiered on television via Kapamilya Channel and A2Z from May 30 to August 1, 2021 via Yes Weekend! Sunday evening block. The second and final season premiered from April 24 to August 14, 2022. The series follows Maxpein, a spunky girl who agrees to live with her wealthy father in Manila, where she stands up to Deib, the school's basketball captain.

== Premise ==
Maxpein is a spunky provincial girl raised by her grandmother and uncle, after her mother died in Japan when she was 11 years old. Maxpein is surprised when her wealthy father, whom she recently discovered, offers to help pay for her grandmother's hospitalization. Out of gratitude, she agrees to her father's request to live with him and his family in Manila. Maxpein is treated as an unwelcome outsider at Benison International School where she stands up against Deib, the basketball varsity captain. Deib gets their entire batchmates to prank and bully Maxpein, but the more they engage in their game of cat-and-dog one-upmanship, the more Deib realizes that his goal to crush Maxpein's spirit has turned into a love crush for the girl he never thought he would even like. However, the return of the ghosts from their past and their various family problems threaten to ruin Max and Deib's blossoming and fragile romance.

== Cast and characters ==
=== Main cast ===
- Donny Pangilinan as Deib Lohr Enrile
- Belle Mariano as Maxpein "Max" Zin Del Valle Luna

=== Supporting cast ===
- Jeremiah Lisbo as Randall "RJ" Echavez, Jr.
- Kaori Oinuma as Michiko Sil Tarranza
- Vivoree Esclito as Melissa "Ysay" Baylon
- Joao Constancia as Lee Roi Gozon
- Criza Taa as Zarnaih "Naih" Marchessa
- Dalia Varde as Kimeniah "Kim" Sirvey Gozon
- Ashley Del Mundo as Khloe Gomez
- Gello Marquez as Lorde Dawatap
- Mikha Lim as Elle Luna (Season 2)
- Limer Veloso as Gavin "Migz" Agripa
- Rajo Serrano as Karlos "Karlie" Granada
- Turs Daza as Dale Leon Enrile

=== Recurring cast ===
- Marissa Delgado as Bhaves del Valle
- Janus del Prado as Boyet del Valle / Christopher Santos
- Richard Quan as Maxim Luna
- Issa Litton as Macy Luna
- Ana Abad Santos as Dr. Evita Enrile
- Art Acuña as Dr. Daniel Enrile
- Joel Trinidad as Headmaster JP Quisimbing
- Floyd Tena as Atty. Randall "Randy" Echavez, Sr.
- Milo Elmido Jr. as Madam Barb

=== Guest cast ===
- Yayo Aguila as Maxpein's mother
- JC Alcantara as Miguel "Nurse M" Rizal
- Shanaia Gomez as Dominique "Dom" Rossi
- Reich Alim as Rhumzell "Zell" Echavez
- River Joseph as John Benjamin "Jaybee" Jose
- CJ Salonga as Diego "Digs" Zorilla
- Zach Castañeda as Kurt Peter Aragon
- Dolly de Leon as Mrs. Catalan
- Karl Medina as Johann Gonzales
- Ryan Rems as Tiago
- Sophie Reyes as Aimee Jung (main cast on season 1)
- Esnyr Ranollo as Benison Student (c/o Kumu Campaign)
- Bea Carlos as Benison Student (c/o Kumu Campaign)
- Kerwin King as Benison Student (c/o Kumu Campaign)
- BGYO as themselves

=== Former cast ===
- Rhys Miguel as Yakiro Tobi "Tob" Yanai
- Melizza Jimenez as Elle Luna (Season 1)
- Jim Morales as Choco
- Kuya Manzano as Headmaster Mendoza
- Patrick Quiroz as Hunter
- Dylan Talon as Von
- Jelay Pilones as Beata
- Lie Reposposa as Marigold

== Episodes ==
Season	Episodes	Originally released	
Season	Episodes	First released	Last released
1	10	May 28, 2021; May 30, 2021 (television broadcast)	July 30, 2021; August 1, 2021 (TV airing)
2	16	April 22, 2022; April 24, 2022 (television broadcast)	August 3, 2022; August 14, 2022 (TV airing)

=== Season 1 (2021) ===
No. overall	No. in season	Title	Original release date	TV air date
1	1	"Hate at First Sight"	May 28, 2021	May 30, 2021
Max moves from Mindoro to Manila to live with her estranged father and study in a new school. On her first day, however, she gets off on the wrong foot with Deib, the leader of Alpha 3 and the most popular student of Benison International School.
2	2	"Project: Blocked"	June 4, 2021	June 6, 2021
Triggered by Max's defiance against him, Deib revives "Project: Blocked," a school-wide scheme to make her life on campus a living hell. While Max tries hard to fight back, Deib, behind his strong and cold façade, faces a battle only he knows about.
3	3	"Taguro vs. Sensui"	June 11, 2021	June 13, 2021
As Deib and Max continue to clash in school, their recent fight catches the headmaster's attention. To avoid suspension, the two agree to work on a project together. At the same time, the Alpha 3 encounter Randall, the rival school's team captain.
4	4	"Friend Request Accepted?"	June 18, 2021	June 20, 2021
To prepare for their anti-bullying project, Max goes to Deib's house and meets his mom. While working together, the two get to know each other better, which paves the way for a successful presentation that puts an end to all the bullying in school.
5	5	"Friend Request Denied!"	June 25, 2021	June 27, 2021
After the success of Max and Deib's anti-bullying project, the Headmaster puts in charge of a school event. Deib realizes he has romantic feelings for Max, leading him to sudden public confession that puts the young lady off.
6	6	"Max Pained"	July 2, 2021	July 4, 2021
Wanting Max to give herself a chance to open her heart to Deib, their friends enact a plan to help them settle their misunderstanding. However, an unexpected turn of events endangers Max's life, leading to the revelation of a family secret.
7	7	"She's Back"	July 9, 2021	July 11, 2021
A worried Deib leads an investigation on the recent attack on Max. After she returned to school, Deib admits his feelings for Max and asks to court her. But the return of his ex, Kim, poses hindrance to their blossoming relationship.
8	8	"The Queen Bee and the Shark"	July 16, 2021	July 18, 2021
Kim tries to win Deib back, but he makes it clear to her that they are done. Likewise, RJ shows up and tries to rekindle his relationship with Max. The revelation about her attack causes great distress and heartbreak to Max and her family.
9	9	"Bear Vs. Shark"	July 23, 2021	July 25, 2021
Deib is surprised to learn that Randall and RJ are one and the same. Despite conflict, the two boys eventually agreed to not cause anymore heartache. Unable to return Deib's feelings, Max promises to support him during championship.
10	10	"Love is a Game"	July 30, 2021	August 1, 2021
After making peace with Evita, Deib becomes determined to win the game for his family and Max. However, he becomes distracted when Randall brings Max's loved ones to the event. Later, Max professes her love for Deib.

=== Season 2 (2022) ===
No. overall	No. in season	Title	Original release date	TV air date
11	1	"Rude Awakenings"	April 20, 2022 (Note: The first episode was released first on April 20, 2022 for iWantTFC users outside Philippines and Indonesia before the original release.)	April 24, 2022
Love is in the air in Benison with Max and Deib together and most of their friends paired up. But as Max's family reels from the aftermath of Deib's bullying, the new couple struggles to find the timing to reveal their relationship to her father.
12	2	"Past is Present"	April 27, 2022	May 1, 2022
Deib tries his best to gain Maxim's approval now that his and Max's relationship is finally out. However, with Randall’s deep and undeniable connection with Max, getting on the good side of his girlfriend’s father becomes even more challenging.
13	3	"Operation: Save Deib"	May 4, 2022	May 8, 2022
Deib faces possible expulsion after a parent files a formal complaint against him. Eager to save Deib, Max and their friends think of ways to give him a fair and formal trial.
14	4	"Tests and Trials"	May 11, 2022	May 15, 2022
Max, Deib, and their friends prepare for Deib's trial at Benison. Deib ends up spending time with Kim to return a favor, but unbeknownst to him, Max is working with RJ to help Uncle Boyet.
15	5	"Crime and Punishment"	May 18, 2022	May 22, 2022
After Max saves him from expulsion, Deib makes amends for his bullying past and deals with his father's constant criticism. Meanwhile, Boyet is pushed to a corner when his money problems become insurmountable.
16	6	"He’s Back"	May 25, 2022	May 29, 2022
Max and Deib, and Lee and Naih celebrate their first monthsary with their friends. Someone from the past returns to Michiko's life. Boyet learns the truth about his first victim.
17	7	"No Lies, No Secrets"	June 1, 2022	June 5, 2022
Jealousy is stirred among the couples at the Benison Career Fair. While Max and Deib try to iron out a misunderstanding, Boyet confesses his dark secret to his family.
18	8	"And the Truth Shall…"	June 8, 2022	June 12, 2022
Max is given a choice between protecting Uncle Boyet and keeping her promise to Deib. Finding comfort in RJ's company, Max reevaluates her friendship with him.
19	9	"…Break Hearts"	June 15, 2022	June 19, 2022
Max and Deib try to escape their problems, but their families' dark connection forces them to decide the future of their relationship. Max receives flak as the recent development of the case becomes a hot topic among the students of Benison.
20	10	"Status: Unsure"	June 22, 2022	June 26, 2022
As Uncle Boyet and Dale's case escalates, Max and Deib are unsure where they stand in their relationship. When everything becomes too much to bear, the young couple finds themselves confiding in their exes.
21	11	"Romeo + Juliet, 2022"	June 29, 2022	July 3, 2022
Forbidden by their families from continuing their relationship, Max and Deib are forced to sneak behind everyone's backs to see each other. Tension brews between the Enriles and Del Valles during RJ and Deib's basketball tryouts.
22	12	"A Lot Can Happen in a Week"	July 6, 2022	July 10, 2022
Amid misunderstandings and deteriorating relationships, Max, Deib, and their friends land in detention. While Kim, Karlie, and Khloe try to find the culprit that got them there, Michiko is put on the spot about her growing connection with Dale.
23	13	"Outlaws"	July 13, 2022	July 17, 2022
Being stuck in and breaking out of detention pushes Max, Deib, and friends to be honest about their feelings. Lee and Naih's relationship finally comes to a head, while an ex returns to Dale's life.
24	14	"Hugot Night"	July 20, 2022	July 24, 2022
Max and Deib drive to Batangas to find the answers to Dale and Uncle Boyet's case, while their friends let out all their deep emotional burdens at The Barb's Hugot Night.
25	15	"Second Chances"	July 27, 2022	July 31, 2022
Max, Deib, and friends reflect on their lives and future families as they act as loving parents to their new "Egg Baby" school project. Dale, meanwhile, learns of a truth that will change his life.
26	16	"The End is Just The Beginning"	August 3, 2022	August 7, 2022 (Part 1); August 14, 2022 (Part 2)
Max and friends find ways to comfort Deib after losing his dear brother, Dale. Meanwhile, students prepare to cap off the school year with the highly-anticipated Benison Ball.

== Soundtrack ==
=== He's Into Her: Original Soundtrack ===
He's Into Her: Original Soundtrack

Soundtrack album by Belle Mariano and BGYO
- Released: June 2021
- Recorded: 2021
- Genre: Pop
- Labels: Star Music and Starpop

Singles from He's Into Her
- 1. "He's Into Her by BGYO" Released: April 21, 2021; 2. "Sigurado by Belle Mariano" Released: May 15, 2021

He's Into Her: Original Soundtrack is a soundtrack album by Belle Mariano and various artist. It was released In June 2021 by Star Music and Starpop.

=== He's Into Her Season 2: Original Soundtrack ===
He's Into Her Season 2: Original Soundtrack

Soundtrack album by Belle Mariano, BGYO and various artist
- Released: May 2022
- Genre: Pop
- Labels: Star Music and Starpop

High Street (Original Soundtrack) track listing
No.	Title	Artist	Length
1.	"Best Time"	BGYO	3:36
2.	"Midsummer High"	Nameless Kids	4:30
3.	"Nag-iisa"	Zion Aguirre	5:03
4.	"Pwede Ba?"	Trisha Denise	3:56
5.	"'Til Love Means Love"	Nameless Kids	3:59
6.	"Faded"	Nameless Kids	3:16
7.	"Kahit Na, Kahit Pa"	Belle Mariano	3:40
8.	"Habits"	Nameless Kids	3:36
9.	"Best Time (Stripped Version)"	Jon Guelas	3:51
10.	"Did I Let You Go"	Jon Guelas	3:51
11.	"Outlaws"	Nameless Kids	4:19
12.	"Did You Let Me Go"	Jon Guelas and Vivoree	3:51
13.	"Hindi Kita Iiwan"	Sam Milby	3:53
14.	"I Just Miss You"	ANDREAH	3:24
15.	"Wanna Know Me"	Nameless Kids	4:00
16.	"He's Into Her (Remix)"	BGYO	4:02

== Production ==
=== Background ===
The project was first announced on November 7, 2019. Director Chad Vidanes stated that the story is a romantic comedy with a hint of coming-of-age. In 2020, the production was postponed due to the COVID-19 pandemic and the ABS-CBN shutdown and the denial of franchise renewal.

=== Filming ===
In 2021, filming resumed and wrapped up on the same year.

On February 5, 2022, filming for the second season commenced.

=== Casting ===
On February 22, 2022, eight new cast members has been announced for the second season, including Shanaia Gomez, Mikha Lim of BINI, Reich Alim, Rajo Serrano, River Joseph, Zach Castañeda, CJ Salonga and JC Alcantara. Lim replaced Melizza Jimenez for the role of Elle Luna from the first season, as Jimenez chose to focus on her education in Queensland, Australia according to producer Vanessa Valdez.

== Marketing ==
A teaser of the series was shown on the third season of Your Face Sounds Familiar simultaneously on Star Cinema and iWantTFC's Facebook and YouTube accounts On April 24, 2021. The official trailer for the series was released On May 1, 2021. The promotional poster was released On May 8, 2021. On March 19, 2022, the trailer for the second season has been released.

On May 14, 2021, global posters was released in different languages. On March 19, 2022, the poster of the second season was released. On March 26, 2022, a second poster for the second season was revealed. On April 16, 2022, global posters of the second season was revealed.

On May 15, 2021, merchandise for the series is available for pre-order on online shopping websites and platforms.

During the iWantTFC Unwrapped event On December 10, 2021, a teaser of the second season was shown featuring a tearful confrontation between the characters of Max and Deib who seem to be having some trust issues in their relationship. A new logo and snippet of the new theme song was unveiled On March 8, 2022.

== Release ==
=== Broadcast ===
He's Into Her premiered on Kapamilya Channel and A2Z on May 30 to August 1, 2021, with advanced episodes streamed first on iWantTFC on May 28 to July 30.

The second season was released from April 20, 2022 for iWantTFC users outside the Philippines and Indonesia, and on April 22 to August 3 for users inside the Philippines and Indonesia. The second season premiered on Kapamilya Channel and A2Z from April 24 to August 14 of the same year.

=== Movie cut ===
A two-part film cut of the series' first season was released on November 22, 2021 via iWantTFC.

== Reception ==
The premiere of He's Into Her received a "record-breaking high number of views" on iWantTFC despite technical issues.

=== Accolades ===
Year	Award	Category	Recipient	Result	Ref.
2021	Asian Academy Creative Awards	Best Theme Song or Title Theme	"He's Into Her" (BGYO)	Won	
2021	Asian Academy Creative Awards	Best Original Programme by a Streamer/OTT	He's Into Her	Won	
2021	Asian Academy Creative Awards	Best Direction (Fiction)	He's Into Her	Won	
2021	Venice TV Awards	Cross Platform Programming	He's Into Her	Nominated	
2021	RAWR Awards 2021	Digital Series of the Year	He's Into Her	Won	
2022	RAWR Awards 2022	Digital Series of the Year	He's Into Her	Nominated	
2022	35th PMPC Star Awards for Television	Best Drama Mini Series	He's Into Her	Won	

== See also ==
- List of programs broadcast by ABS-CBN
- List of programs distributed by ABS-CBN Entertainment
- List of Kapamilya Channel original programming
- List of A2Z (TV channel) original programming
- List of iWantTFC original programming
- List of ABS-CBN original drama series
