= Shake, Rattle & Roll Extreme =

2023 Filipino film

- Theatrical release poster
- Directed by: Richard V. Somes (segment "Glitch"); Jerrold Tarog (segment "Mukbang"); Joey de Guzman (segment "Rage")
- Screenplay by: Noreen Capili (segment “Glitch”); Anton Santamaria (segment “Glitch”); Onay Sales-Camero (segment “Mukbang”); Jerrold Tarog (segment “Mukbang”); Trisha Mae Delez (segment “Rage”)
- Produced by: Lily Monteverde; Roselle Monteverde
- Starring: Iza Calzado; Jane de Leon; Jane Oineza; RK Bagatsing; Paul Salas; Miggs Cuaderno; Rob Gomez; AC Bonifacio; Donna Cariaga; Ninong Ry; Angel Guardian; Elle Villanueva; Sarah Edwards
- Edited by: John Paul Somera Ponce (segment ”Glitch”); Jerrold Tarog (segment “Mukbang”); Joey de Guzman (segment “Rage”); Renewin Alano (segment “Rage”)
- Music by: Von De Guzman (segment “Glitch”); Jerrold Tarog (segment “Mukbang”); Andrew R. Florentino (segment ”Rage”); Carlo Lava (segment “Rage”); Miguel Concepcion (segment “Rage”); Pauline Cueto (segment “Rage”)
- Production company: Regal Entertainment
- Distributed by: Regal Films Distribution Co. Ltd.
- Release date: November 29, 2023
- Running time: 148 minutes
- Country: Philippines
- Language: Filipino
- Box office: ₱52 million

Shake, Rattle & Roll Extreme (also known as Shake, Rattle & Roll XVI or Shake, Rattle & Roll 16) is a 2023 Filipino horror anthology film produced by Regal Entertainment, and the sixteenth installment of the Shake, Rattle & Roll film series after a 9-year hiatus since the fifteenth film. It is directed by Jerrold Tarog, Joey de Guzman and Richard Somes. It stars an ensemble cast top-billed by Iza Calzado, Jane de Leon, and Jane Oineza. It is the second Shake, Rattle & Roll film that is not part of the Metro Manila Film Festival since the sixth film in 1997. It received mixed to positive reviews from critics.

The film consists of three segments: a demon wreaks havoc on a family after coming out of a children's television series; influencers visit a mansion full of cannibalistic shapeshifters; and survivors struggle during a rage-induced outbreak caused by a parasite from a meteorite.

This is the last Shake, Rattle & Roll film to be produced by Lily Monteverde before her death in 2024. The film became available for streaming on Netflix on March 1, 2024. The seventeenth installment, Shake, Rattle & Roll: Evil Origins, was released in 2025.

== Plot ==
=== "Glitch" ===
Lyka lives with her single mother Ingrid, her older half-brother Patrick, their housekeeper Hasmine, and their pet dog Choppy. One day, after her tablet breaks and she is blamed by Hasmine and Patrick for several mishaps around the house, while also feeling neglected by her mother, Lyka breaks down in her room. Her phone inexplicably begins playing a children's show featuring a mascot named Gary the Goat, which appears to possess Lyka, who then repeats an incantation from the show that invites Gary's spirit into their home. A stuffed goat toy suddenly materializes in her room, which Lyka tells Ingrid and Hasmine was a gift from a "friend". Choppy, sensing the spirit's presence and persistently barking at the toy, is violently killed one night.

As Lyka becomes engrossed in Gary's show, paranormal events begin to occur in the house. Patrick's phone inexplicably turns on and captures an intimate moment between him and his girlfriend Margot. When the photos later surface on Lyka’s tablet, Ingrid confronts Patrick, leading to a heated argument that causes him to run away. Meanwhile, Hasmine becomes terrified after witnessing Gary's demonic, goat-like form watching over Lyka as she plays with her tablet.

The following day, while Ingrid goes to find Patrick, Hasmine is attacked and decapitated by Gary. Margot visits the house only to find a horrified Lyka, and is killed as well. Ingrid and Patrick return, discover the corpses, and find Lyka being terrorized by Gary. In the ensuing attack, they discover that Gary is repelled by a crozier belonging to the house's blessed religious statue of Jesus, Mary, and Joseph. Ingrid uses the staff to drive Gary back, allowing her children to escape, but is severely injured and eventually overpowered in the backyard. As Gary begins to strangle Patrick, Lyka climbs a statue of Saint Michael and dislodges its sword, which she throws to Ingrid. Ingrid uses the sword to stab and destroy Gary, before collapsing from her injuries as Lyka and Patrick gather by her side.

=== "Mukbang" ===
A group of social media influencers, including Vee, Adelle, Ashley, and Chef Kino, travel to a remote luxurious mansion to collaborate with fellow influencers Robin and Raye for a mukbang live stream. They are later joined by Vee's boyfriend, Lionel, whose relationship with her is strained. For the night, Chef Kino cooks the meat supplied by the eccentric Mang Isko, unaware that it is the remains of Adelle's assistant Beyonce and Ashley’s assistant Hannah; both had been lured away and killed by unknown creatures, who then assumed their forms.

During a party, the group notices strange behavior from "Beyonce" and "Hannah", including cryptic comments suggesting the group unknowingly consumed their friends' remains. The impostors eventually reveal themselves as century-old shapeshifters undergoing a ritual called "transfiguration". After the party disperses, Raye, Robin and Mang Isko, also revealed to be shapeshifters, coordinate an attack on the guests. Adelle survives an initial attack and alerts the others. She and Ashley hide together while live-streaming the chaos, but Ashley ultimately pushes Adelle as bait. She is later cornered by Mang Isko, who thanks her for luring the group before she is killed and eaten by the now-transfigured Adelle and other monsters.

Vee and Lionel fend off the monsters while simultaneously bickering about their relationship, eventually culminating in Lionel staying behind to allow Vee to escape. Once outside, Vee meets Lionel and believes he has survived until quickly realizing he has also been transfigured. Before she can escape, Raye, Robin, and Mang Isko kill her.

The next day, Chef Kino, spared due to the monsters taking a liking to his cooking, is forced to prepare dishes using the influencers' remains. The transfigured influencers resume the mukbang, which goes viral online, prompting Robin and Raye to begin planning their next collaboration for new victims.

=== "Rage" ===
Trina, her boyfriend Moze, and their friends Alfie, Bong, and Shai encounter their friend Coy while passing through his village during a road trip. Coy invites the group to spend the night near a nearby river to watch a meteor shower. While crossing the river, Bong discovers fragments of a meteorite and becomes infected by a parasite that emerges from the rock upon contact. When Shai tries to help him, Bong becomes violent and stabs her before being killed by the rest of the group. The friends place Bong and Shai’s bodies in a nearby hut, and Moze and Alfie set out to find help, narrowly surviving an attack by two similarly infected villagers.

Back at the hut, Trina is attacked by the reanimated Bong and Shai but is rescued by Coy, who reveals that his village has been overrun by zombified residents infected by parasitic organisms from the meteorites. The group finds refuge with the village captain at her house, along with a pregnant woman named Faya. While looking for a restroom, Trina discovers several corpses and is captured by the captain, who had drugged the others' drinks. At gunpoint, the captain forces Trina into the basement to reveal her zombified son, whom she has been keeping alive by sacrificing uninfected villagers. Trina manages to escape by pushing the captain into her son, who kills her.

Trina wakes her friends and flees with them and Faya. When their tricycle breaks down at a nearby school, the noise of Moze's attempts to restart it attracts a horde of the infected. Coy is caught and killed in the chaos. They eventually reach a warehouse, where Moze and Alfie are attacked by infected workers. Alfie becomes infected in the skirmish, forcing Moze to kill him. Meanwhile, Faya goes into labor and is helped by Trina. The noise draws more of the infected, prompting Moze to give Trina the keys to a truck while he distracts the horde, allowing Trina, Faya, and the newborn to escape.

On the road, Faya succumbs to childbirth complications and dies, leaving Trina to continue alone with the baby. She calls her mother to tell her she is on her way home, as a news broadcast reveals that the meteor shower triggered a global outbreak of the "rage-borne disease".

== Cast ==
=== "Glitch" ===
- Iza Calzado as Ingrid Salvador
- Miggs Cuaderno as Patrick Salvador
- Donna Cariaga as Hasmine
- Angel Guardian as Margot
- Jewel Milag as Lyka Salvador
- Kim Atienza as John Cornelius
- Vaughn Ross Meneses Versoza as Gary the Goat / Creature

=== "Mukbang" ===
- Jane Oineza as Vee
- RK Bagatsing as Lionel
- Paul Salas as Robin
- AC Bonifacio as Ashley
- Ninong Ry as Chef Kino
- Elle Villanueva as Raye
- Phi Palmos as Beyonce
- Esnyr Ranollo as Adelle
- Jana Taladro as Hannah
- Francis Mata as Mang Isko
- Ian Gimena as Isaac
- Jhon Adrian Sual as Monster 1
- Vajie Fernandez as Monster 2
- JL Martin as Monster 3
- Mark Anthony Caing as Monster 4

=== "Rage" ===
- Jane de Leon as Trina
- Rob Gomez as Alfie
- Sarah Edwards as Faya
- Paolo Gumabao as Moze
- Bryce Eusebio as Coy
- Dustin Yu as Bong
- Mika Reins as Shai
- Maita Ejercito as Kapitana
- Jerico Estregan as Kapitana's Son
- Keahnna Reyes as Tourist
- Rosh Barman as Infected Farmer
- Pedro Mesa Anzano III as Infected Chainsaw Man

== Reception ==
=== Box office ===
Shake, Rattle & Roll Extreme reportedly earned ₱3.3 million at the Philippine box-office on its opening day.

=== Critical response ===
The film received mixed to positive reviews from critics. Most reviews praised the second episode of the anthology, "Mukbang".

Joseph R. Atilano of the Philippine Daily Inquirer gave the film a perfect score of ten, calling it one of "the best ever made in the Philippines in the last 20 years. Atilano also praised the performances of Iza Calzado, Jane De Leon, Angel Guardian, Jane Oineza and RK Bagatsing, saying: "[They] did a fantastic job in their respective roles. They brought their “A-Game.” All of them have served their purpose in providing memorable onscreen characters for moviegoers." Writing for ClickTheCity, Wanggo Gallaga rated the film four out of five stars, describing the film as a "worthy continuation of the classic, legacy series..." and praised the performances of Iza Calzado, Jane de Leon, Donna Cariaga, RK Bagatsing, Esnyr Ranollo, AC Bonifacio, Phi Palmos, and Ninong Ry.

Lé Baltar of Rappler gave the film a mixed review. She described its second section "Mukbang" as a "stand-out" and "a moment of sturdiness in a shaky whole." Although Baltar described the other episodes as "artificial" ("Glitch") and "flat and stale" ("Rage"), she commended Donna Cariaga, Jane De Leon, and Bryce Eusebio's acting performances.

Likewise, Rafael Bautista of Nylon Manila called "Mukbang" the best section of the film, writing that it was a "crowd-pleaser" and "worth the price of admission alone." He praised Esnyr Ranollo and AC Bonifacio's "scene-stealing" performances and commended Ninong Ry as well. He described the film's first section, "Glitch," as "its weakest, though it is far from bad." He wrote, "Premise-wise, Glitch shines with how it touches upon the idea of “Lost Media” and creepypastas of dark web videos with sinister origins. [...] But it falters when it moves into more generic and predictable haunted house territory." Bautista praised Iza Calzado's "knockout performance." He described the final section, "Rage," as "beyond thrilling" and hailed Jane De Leon's performance as "the best part of the episode," though he also said that "Rage stumbles with how it quickly moves through interesting concepts[...] and ends on a predictable note."

Januar Junior Aguja of Freeman Cebu described the film as "decent." He gave the first episode, "Glitch," two stars out of five, writing that it "feel[s] unsatisfactory in its execution. Lost media as a horror concept holds much promise yet it’s suddenly abandoned as soon as Gary appears in Lyka’s imaginative mind." He gave "Mukbang" four and a half stars out of five, stating that "'Mukbang' will surely go down as one of the best 'SRR' episodes to date, all thanks to Tarog’s satire commentary on influencer culture." Aguja described the characters in "Mukbang" as "quite likable," noting that "they have their own time to shine, which is not easy to pull off with an ensemble cast in a 50-minute story." He also commended Ninong Ry's performance. Aguja gave "Rage," the final episode, three stars out of five. He described Jane De Leon as the "highlight" of the film, but criticized the flatness of the other characters.

=== Accolades ===
Year	Awards	Category	Recipient	Result	Ref.
2024	40th PMPC Star Awards for Movies	New Movie Actor of the Year	Dustin Yu	Won	
2024	Ima Wa Ima Asian Film Festival	Best Actress	Jane de Leon	Won	

== See also ==
- List of ghost films
