= Elijah Alejo =

Filipina actress

- Born: Elijah Christian Ong Alejo; November 13, 2004 (age 21); Las Piñas, Manila, Philippines
- Occupation: Actress
- Years active: 2010–present
- Agents: Sparkle; Regal; (2010–present)
- Known for: Brianna Elaine Fajardo-Dimaculangan / Claveria in Prima Donnas; Chynna Serrano in Underage
- Height: 1.57 m (5 ft 2 in)

Elijah Christian Ong Alejo (Tagalog pronunciation: [ɔŋ ʔɐˈlɛho]; born November 13, 2004) is a Filipino actress. She is known for both her antagonist role in Prima Donnas as Brianna and her protagonist role in Underage as Chynna.

== Early life and education ==
Alejo was born on November 13, 2004. She finished elementary school. She studied senior high school in Manila Central University, under the Science, Technology, Engineering and Mathematics (STEM) strand. She finished senior high school. She currently studies bachelor's degree in medical technology in the same school.

== Acting career ==
In April 2020, she wrote her first Wattpad novel titled "Unexpectedly In Love".

Alejo was cast in December 2025 in the horror film Shake, Rattle & Roll Evil Origins (also known as Shake, Rattle & Roll XVII), an official entry in the 51st Metro Manila Film Festival (MMFF). Alejo was also in the romance-comedy film She Who Must Not Be Named which is toplined by Francine Diaz and Seth Fedelin (FranSeth).

== Other activities ==
=== Business ventures ===
In February 2025, she launched her own business venture called Haliya, a signature perfume line inspired by her deep love for niche, designer, and Middle Eastern scents. Named after the Bicolano goddess of the moon, she built the brand to channel an independent, fighting spirit as a young entrepreneur.

== Acting credits ==
=== Film ===
Key
†	Denotes films that have not yet been released

Elijah Alejo's film credits with year of release, film titles and roles
Year	Title	Role	Ref.
2010	Super Inday and the Golden Bibe	Nameless Girl	
2010	Shake, Rattle and Roll 12	Abigail	
2010	Rosario	Trinidad	
2012	My Cactus Heart	Young Sandy	
2012	I Do Bidoo Bidoo: Heto nAPO Sila!	Young Tracy	
2016	Working Beks	Sasa	
2016	Imagine You & Me	Gina	
2017	Selda 1430		
2020	Death of Nintendo	Shiara	
2020	Magikland	Mara Marapara	
2025	Kontrabida Academy	Candy	
2025	KMJS' Gabi ng Lagim: The Movie	Joan	
2025	The Heart of Music	Christina	
2025	Shake, Rattle & Roll: Evil Origins	Hermana Ana	
2026	She Who Must Not Be Named	Janna Marie Montefalco	

=== Television ===
Key
†	Denotes shows that have not yet been aired

Elijah Alejo's television credits with year of release, title(s) and role
Year	Title	Role	Notes	Ref.
2010	Kaya ng Powers	Amferia Amfon 'Amfi' Heneres		
2010	Pidol's Wonderland	Baby V		
2011	Munting Heredera	Abigail		
2011–2012	Kung Aagawin Mo ang Langit	Samantha		
2013	My Husband's Lover	Hannah Soriano		
2014	Magpakailanman	Young Ana	Episode: "My Love Forever"	
2014	Innamorata	Young Esper		
2014	Innamorata	Young Evangeline		
2014	Sa Puso ni Dok	Angela		
2015	Magpakailanman	Young May	Episode: "Ang Mamatay Nang Dahil Sa'yo: The PO2 Ephraim 'Bok' Mejia Story"	
2015	Once Upon a Kiss	Young Athena Almario		
2015	Magpakailanman	Young Mimay	Episode: "Ang Huling Yakap sa Nawalang Anak"	
2015	Marimar	Young Marimar		
2016	Magpakailanman	Young Milette	Episode: "Tiyahin ko, Karibal ko"	
2016	Conan, My Beautician	Young Ava		
2016	Magpakailanman	Young Rovie	Episode: "Ang Lihim ni Rovie"	
2016	Ika-6 na Utos	Young Emma de Jesus		
2017	Legally Blind	Young Grace		
2017	Magpakailanman	Christel	Episode: "Justice for the Battered Child: The Linda Cagalitan Story"	
2017	Meant to Be	Granddaughter of Lola Madj		
2017	Magpakailanman	Teen Emilia	Episode "Mag-inang Biktima"	
2017	Magpakailanman	Janine	Episode "Anak mo, Anak ko, Anak natin"	
2017	Wagas	Young Isabel Granada	Episode: "Ang Wagas na Pag-ibig ni Arnel Cowley para kay Isabel Granada"	
2017–2018	Super Ma'am	Young Minerva Henerala		
2018	Sherlock Jr.	Young Irene Manansala		
2018	Daig Kayo ng Lola Ko	Alice's friend	Episode: "Beauty and the Beast"	
2019	Stories for the Soul	Tintin	Episode: "Uhaw na Tubig"	
2019–2022	Prima Donnas	Brianna Elaine Fajardo-Dimaculangan		
2020	Dear Uge	Nona	Episode: "Teacher Pet"	
2020	Magpakailanman	Mylene	Episode: "The Abandoned Sisters"	
2021	I Can See You: The Lookout	Christine Penuliar		
2022	Daig Kayo ng Lola Ko	Tammy	Episode: "Tammy Tamad"	
2022	Magpakailanman	Pem	Episode: "My Father's Killer"	
2022	Magpakailanman	Abby	Episode: "Teenage Mama: The Abbygail Fernandez Story"	
2022	Daig Kayo ng Lola Ko	Pippa	Episode: "Papa Pig"	
2022	Tadhana	Nadine Reyes-Bermudez	Episode "Isabella"	
2023	Regal Studio Presents	Liezel	Episode: "Hot Momma"	
2023	Underage	Serena "Chynna" Serrano		
2023	In my Dreams	Stephanie		
2023	Wish Ko Lang!	Nene	Episode: "Nanay na Binugbog"	
2023	Regal Studio Presents	Yohanne	Episode: "Ang Pasko ni Santi"	
2023–2024	Black Rider	Young Vanessa "Bane" Bartolome-Romero		
2023–2024	Lovers & Liars	Mayette Salalac		
2024	Regal Studio Presents	Yohanne	Episode: "Remember Me, Santi"	
2024	Abot-Kamay na Pangarap	Carla Madrigal		
2024	Regal Studio Presents	Jasmine	Episode: "My Crazy Yandao"	
2024	Magpakailanman	Princess	Episode: "Ang Nanay Kong Adik: The Judie Anne Picoc Story"	
2024–2025	Lilet Matias: Attorney-at-Law	Mylene		
2024–2025	Forever Young	Katherine "Kathy" Malaque		
2025	Regal Studio Presents	Candy	Episode: "Wicked Sisters"	
2025	Maka	Elijah Rodente		
2025	Regal Studio Presents	Young Irene	Episode: "My Future Me"	
2025	Maka Lovestream	Janine	Episode: "Pretty Little Baby"	
2025	Maka Lovestream	Viva	Episode: "Last Christmas"	
2025–2026	Cruz vs Cruz	Coleen Cruz		
2026	Magpakailanman	Young Cathy Mercado	Episode: "Ang Laban at Bawi ni Sugar Mercado"	
2026	Regal Studio Presents	Barbie	Episode: "Barbie's Barberya"	

== Accolades ==
Year	Awards	Category	Recipient	Result	Ref.
2011	27th PMPC Star Awards for Movies	Movie Child Performer of the Year (Shake, Rattle and Roll XII “Mamanyika”)	Elijah Alejo	Nominated	
2021	69th FAMAS Annual Awards	Best Child Performer of the Year (Magikland)	Elijah Alejo	Nominated	
2022	Gawad Dangal Filipino Awards	Most Outstanding Teen/Young Actress	Elijah Alejo	Won	
