= Underage (TV series) =

2023 Philippine television drama series

- Title card
- Genre: Drama
- Based on: Under-age (1980) by Joey Gosiengfiao
- Written by: Wiro Michael Ladera; Kuts Enriquez; Loi Argel Nova; Cynthia Paz
- Directed by: Rechie Del Carmen
- Creative director: Aloy Adlawan
- Starring: Lexi Gonzales; Elijah Alejo; Hailey Mendes
- Theme music composer: Natasha L. Carreos
- Opening theme: "Huwag Kang Matakot" by Hannah Precillas
- Ending theme: "Underage" by Lexi Gonzales, Elijah Alejo and Hailey Mendes
- Country of origin: Philippines
- Original language: Tagalog
- No. of episodes: 78

Production
- Executive producer: Erwin Manzano Hilado
- Camera setup: Multiple-camera setup
- Running time: 22–26 minutes
- Production company: GMA Entertainment Group

Original release
- Network: GMA Network
- Release: January 16 – May 5, 2023

Underage is a 2023 Philippine television drama series broadcast by GMA Network. The series is an adaptation of the 1980 film of the same title by Regal Films. Directed by Rechie Del Carmen, it stars Lexi Gonzales, Elijah Alejo and Hailey Mendes. It premiered on January 16, 2023 on the network's Afternoon Prime line up. The series concluded on May 5, 2023, with a total of 78 episodes.

The series is streaming online on YouTube.

== Cast and characters ==
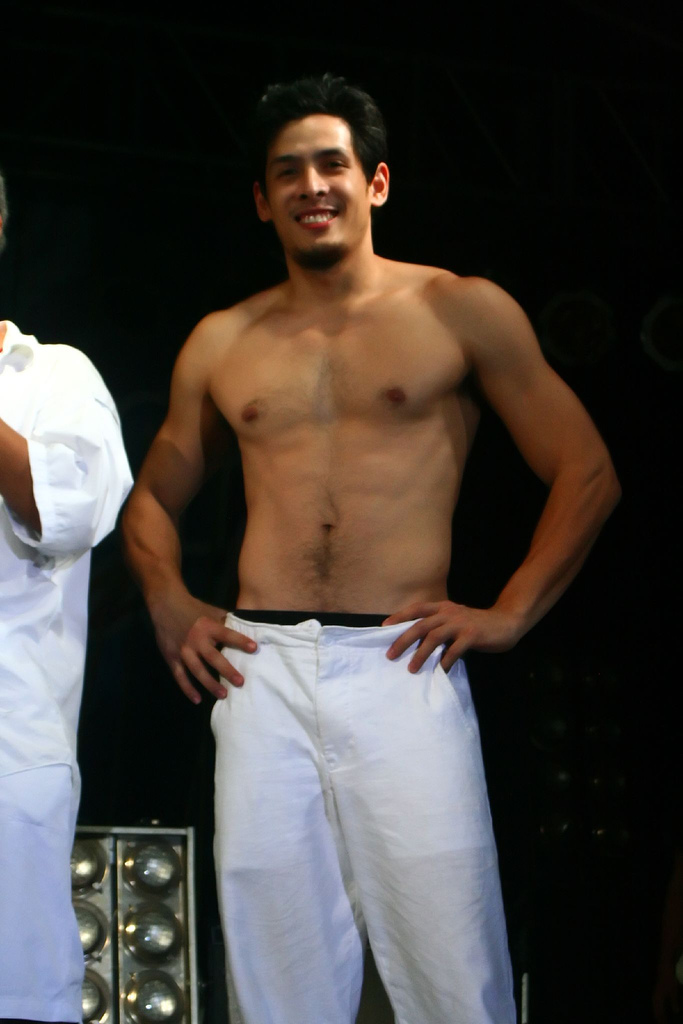
Christian Vasquez portrays Dominic Gatchalian.

Lead cast

- Lexi Gonzales as Celina "Celine" Serrano / Celina "Celine" Gatchalian
- Elijah Alejo as Serena "Chynna" Serrano
- Hailey Mendes as Carina "Carrie" Serrano / Carina "Carrie" Siguenza

Supporting cast

- Sunshine Cruz as Maria Elena "Lena" Serrano
- Snooky Serna as Velda Alcantara-Gatchalian (formerly Guerrero)
- Gil Cuerva as Lancer "Lance" A. Guerrero
- Vince Crisostomo as Christopher "Tope" Miranda
- Christian Vasquez as Dominic Gatchalian
- Yayo Aguila as Rebecca "Becca" Serrano
- Jean Saburit as Ylvira Gatchalian
- Jome Silayan as Enrico "Rico" Siguenza
- Maey Bautista as Remicia "Remi"

Guest cast

- Smokey Manaloto as Delfin Serrano
- Nikki Co as Leonardo "Leo" A. Guerrero
- Anjay Anson as Lester
- Chrome Prince Cosio as Philip Castro
- John Philip Koch as Bhong C. Abalante
- Angelito Galang as Gelo
- Jalyn Perez as a television reporter
- Michael Brian as Lorenzo
- Lotlot Bustamante as Lourdes
- Sharmaine Suarez as Darla
- Eliza Sarmiento as Elsa
- Judie dela Cruz as Meggy

== Production ==
Principal photography commenced in September 2022.

== Ratings ==
According to AGB Nielsen Philippines' Nationwide Urban Television Audience Measurement People in television homes, the pilot episode of Underage earned a 7.2% rating.

== Accolades ==
Accolades received by Underage
Year	Award	Category	Recipient	Result	Ref.
2024	5th VP Choice Awards	TV Series of the Year (Afternoon)	Underage	Nominated	
