= Donna Cariaga =

Filipina actress, comedienne

- Born: Donna Liza Cariaga; September 21, 1993 (age 33); Baguio, Benguet, Philippines
- Education: Saint Louis University
- Occupations: Actress; comedienne; producer
- Years active: 2017–present

Donna Liza Cariaga (born September 21, 1993) is a Filipina comedienne, actress, and television personality best known for competing and winning on the second season of Funny One, a comedy competition segment on the ABS-CBN noontime variety show It's Showtime, and having her own segment on the show titled Donna What to Do, Donna What to Say after her win.

== Early life and background ==
Donna was an introvert when she was in high school; despite being an introvert, she was elected SSC president in high school.

Donna studied Mass Communication at Baguio City’s Saint Louis University, even though she wanted to be an engineer.

=== Personal life ===
Donna is currently single with no dating records at present.

== Career ==
In her college days, Donna joined theater so she can support her expenses in school. Despite being an introvert, she became one of the best products of Tanghalang SLU, the performing theater arts organization of Saint Louis University in Baguio City.

She had no intention of joining a theater but eventually grew to loving it. She gave up her dream of becoming an actor but she became such after winning in Funny One and explored the field of acting.

Before she wins the Funny One segment on It's Showtime, she was doing extra in Forevermore, a Philippine television drama where she have an acting scene with Liza Soberano because it was shot in Baguio City.

== Filmography ==
=== Film ===
Year	Title	Role	Ref!
2026	18th Rose	Ms. Melai	
2025	Bar Boys: After School	Anita	
2025	Rekonek		
2025	Unmarry	Janice	
2025	Ang Happy Homes ni Diane Hilario		
2025	Lola Barang		
2025	Flower Girl	Commercial Director	
2025	Everything About My Wife	Sophia	
2025	Sampung Utos Kay Josh	Holdupper's Wife	
2024	Espantaho	Frida	
2024	My Future You	Flower Vendor	
2024	Mujigae		
2024	Balota	Anita Hernandez	
2024	Fruitcake	Sonia	
2024	A Lab Story	Ma'am Kristine	
2024	I Am Not Big Bird	Tanya	
2023	Family of Two	Donna	
2023	Shake, Rattle & Roll Extreme	Hasmine (segment "Glitch")	
2023	A Very Good Girl	Karen Merino	
2023	Third World Romance	Maymay	
2023	Ten Little Mistresses	Chicklet	
2022	Mahal Kita, Beksman	Analyn	
2022	Retirada		
2022	Ngayon Kaya	Charmaigne	
2021	The Women of TONTA Club	Waitress	
2021	Huwag Kang Lalabas	Daday (segment "Hotel")	
2021	Love Is Color Blind	Stephi	
2021	Rabid	Princess	
2021	On the Job: The Missing 8	Melai	
2021	A Girl and a Guy	Marga	
2019	3pol Trobol: Huli Ka Balbon!	Gloria	
2019	Unforgettable	Lotto Outlet Customer	
2019	Papa Pogi	Venus	
2018	The Hopeful Romantic	Ilocana Maid	
2018	Unli Life	Hugot Tina	
2018	Harry & Patty	Dolly	
2017	Dapol tan payawar na Tayug 1931	Valentina Vidal	
2017	Neomanila	Gang Member	

=== TV series ===
Year	Title	Role
2026	LOL: Last One Laughing Philippines season 2	Herself / contestant / Winner
2025	Rainbow Rumble	Herself / contestant
2022–present	Regal Studio Presents	Czarina / Kuring / Maribel
2024	Makiling	Emily
2024	Tadhana	Belinda
2023	Batang Quiapo	Becky
2023	Open 24/7	Piyaya Matriona Grey Bark
2022	Daddy's Gurl	Roxy
2022	Ano'ng meron kay Abok?	Chicharon Lady
2022	Hoy, Love You!	Dok Wanda
2022	Panalo o talo, It's You!	Minda
2022	Mano Po Legacy: Her Big Boss	Guia
2022	Love at the End of the World	Tess
2021	Limited Edition	Chona
2021	Folklore	Let
2019	Manilennials	Mrs. Marquino Assistant
2019	Ipaglaban Mo!	Aya
2018	Alamat ng Ano	Chandra Mae
2017	It's Showtime	Herself / contestant
2014	Forevermore	Assistant

=== Theater ===
Year	Title	Ref!
2025	Mga Magindara sa Siyudad	

== Awards and nominations ==
Accolades received by Donna Cariaga
Award	Date of ceremony	Category	Recipient(s)	Result	Ref.
45th Gawad Urian Awards	November 17, 2022	Gawad Urian for Best Actress	Donna Cariaga	Nominated	
