= Dustin Yu =

Filipino actor (born 2001)

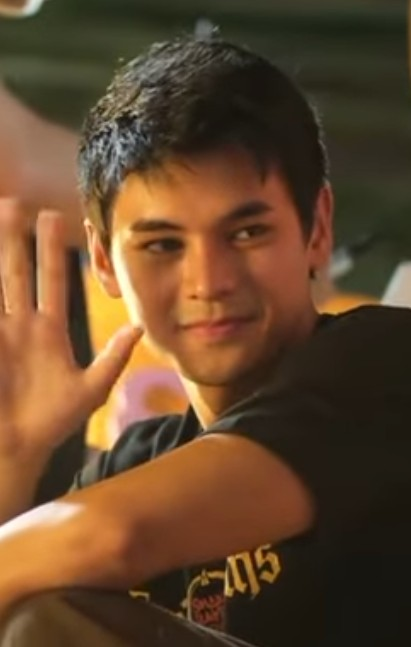
- Yu in 2025
- Born: Dustin Charles Yu; May 13, 2001 (age 25); Quezon City, Philippines
- Other names: Dustin, Adrian, Junjun, Kenneth, Edward
- Occupations: Actor, businessman
- Years active: 2021–present
- Agents: Regal; Sparkle; (2022–present)
- Notable work: Mano Po Legacy: The Family Fortune; Black Rider; The Secrets of Hotel 88
- Height: 5 ft 8 in (173 cm)
- Website: Dustin Yu on Instagram

Dustin Charles Yu (born May 13, 2001) is a Filipino actor and businessman. He gained recognition for his roles in various television series and films, particularly in Mano Po Legacy: The Family Fortune and Pinoy Big Brother: Celebrity Collab Edition.

He is currently under the managed by Sparkle GMA Artist Center.

== Early life and background ==
Dustin Charles Yu was born on May 13, 2001, in Quezon City. He is a third-year marketing student at the University of Santo Tomas. He was also a varsity player and team captain in both elementary and high school.

== Acting career ==
Yu began his acting career in 2021 portraying a various roles in some episodes of drama anthology series Regal Studio Presents episodes. He later joined the Philippine drama series Mano Po Legacy: The Family Fortune portraying Kenneth Sy Chan in 2022. He became part of the series Pulang Araw and Black Rider. He also starred in movies under his agency Regal Films, including Shake, Rattle & Roll Extreme and Guilty Pleasure.

== Personal life ==
Yu is active on social media, particularly Instagram, where he shares updates about his professional and personal life. He stands at 5 feet 8 inches (173 centimetres).

In 2024, alongside his business partners, he launched Eraya, a fusion restaurant located in San Juan, Manila.

== Acting credits ==
=== Film ===
Key
†	Denotes films that have not yet been released

Dustin Yu's film credits with year of release, film titles and roles
Year	Title	Role	Ref.
2023	Shake, Rattle & Roll Extreme	Bong	
2024	Guilty Pleasure	Zach	
2025	Love You So Bad	Laurence Adrian "LA" Dolores	
2025	Shake, Rattle & Roll: Evil Origins	Riel	
2026	Almost Us	Kenzo	

=== Television ===
Key
†	Denotes shows that have not yet been aired

Dustin Yu's television credits with year of release, title(s) and role
Year	Title	Role	Ref.
2021	Regal Studio Presents: Myra's Miracle	Adrian	
2022	Mano Po Legacy: The Family Fortune	Kenneth Sy Chan	
2022	Regal Studio Presents: Ate Knows Best	Dave	
2022	Regal Studio Presents: Super Besh	Justin	
2022	Regal Studio Presents: Isn't She Lovely	Matt	
2022	Mano Po Legacy: The Flower Sisters	Kenneth Chan	
2023	Regal Studio Presents: My Family, My Home	Peter	
2023	Wish Ko Lang: Debutante	Adrian	
2023	Regal Studio Presents: The One That Goat	Ponyong	
2023	Regal Studio Presents: Car Wash Boys	Timmy	
2023	Pepito Manaloto: Tuloy ang Kuwento	Junjun	
2023	Regal Studio Presents: Mother, Mother Where Are You?	Kiko	
2023	Daddy's Gurl: In Check na Yarn	Dustin Chan	
2023–2024	Black Rider	Timothy Geronimo	
2024	Lilet Matias: Attorney-at-Law	Trixie's Friend	
2024	Regal Studio Presents: Promdi City	Jhong	
2024	Pulang Araw	Kenji	
2025	Binibining Marikit	Baron	
2025	Pinoy Big Brother: Celebrity Collab Edition	Housemate	
2025	Rainbow Rumble	Contestant	
2025	ASAP XP	Co-host / Performer	
2025	Pinoy Big Brother: Celebrity Collab Edition 2.0	Houseguest	
2026	The Secrets of Hotel 88	Edward Arellano	

=== Music video appearances ===
Year	Title	Artist	Note	Ref.
2025	"Kinakabahan"	Lily	with Bianca de Vera	

== Accolades ==
Year	Award giving body	Category	Nominated work	Results	Ref.
2024	40th PMPC Star Movie Awards	New Movie Actor of the Year	Shake, Rattle & Roll Extreme	Won	
