= Papa Pogi =

2019 Comedy film directed by Alex Calleja

- Theatrical release poster
- Directed by: Alex Calleja
- Screenplay by: Alex Calleja; Ferdie Aguas
- Story by: Alex Calleja
- Starring: Teddy Corpuz; Myrtle Sarrosa; Donna Cariaga
- Cinematography: Rommel Sales
- Edited by: Renewin Alano
- Music by: Myka Magsaysay; Paul Sigua
- Production company: Regal Entertainment
- Distributed by: Regal Films Distribution
- Release date: March 20, 2019
- Running time: 100 minutes
- Country: Philippines
- Language: Filipino
- Box office: ₱500,000

Papa Pogi is a 2019 Philippine fantasy comedy film directed by Alex Calleja, co-written by Calleja and Ferdie Aguas. It stars Teddy Corpuz, Myrtle Sarrosa and Donna Cariaga. The film is the first lead role of Corpuz, Cariaga and Sarrosa

== Plot ==
Romeo "Papa Pogi" is a charming, kind-hearted, but otherwise ordinary man. Despite being average in looks, he is a magnet for beautiful women. His appeal is almost magical he doesn’t try, yet women fall at his feet. The reason is a peculiar family curse handed down through generations.

According to Daddy Samson, Romeo's charismatic but aging father, their family is cursed, any “pogi” (handsome) man in their bloodline who marries a beautiful woman is doomed to have an unattractive son. This odd twist of fate has caused generations of romantic misadventures and left the family with a trail of broken hearts, social mishaps, and inherited insecurities.

Now that Daddy Samson is growing older and desperate to break the curse before he dies, he begs Romeo to do what no Pogi has done before, fall in love with a woman not based on looks but on character. The request seems simple until Romeo realizes how hard it is to resist his natural “pogi” magnetism.

Romeo works as a manager at a local ad agency, where his loyal secretary Venus toils by his side. Venus is plain-looking, bookworm, and often ignored—except by Romeo, who appreciates her efficiency but never really sees her. Unknown to him, Venus has been in love with him for years. She's the kind of woman who knows his coffee order, reminds him to call his dad, and laughs at his worst jokes not out of flattery, but love.

One day, Romeo saves a beautiful woman from an awkward fall at the mall, Helena, a glamorous influencer and model. The moment is electric. She’s stunning, smart, witty and completely into Romeo. The attraction is mutual, and Romeo soon finds himself being publicly flaunted on Helena's vlogs and Instagram posts. He starts enjoying the attention and the status of being “the guy who got the girl every guy wants.”

But complications arise. Venus begins to withdraw emotionally from Romeo, hurt but too proud to say why. Daddy Samson is furious, accusing Romeo of falling into the same trap as every generation before him. To test the curse, Daddy Samson enlists a local albularyo (folk healer), who performs a comical but heartfelt ritual involving balut, amulets, and Romeo's baby pictures. When a chicken feather floats toward a photo of Helena, it’s interpreted as a bad omen, solid proof that Helena may continue the curse.

Romeo is torn between what his heart feels and what society tells him to want. Venus, meanwhile, is offered a job in Singapore and prepares to leave. In a moment of panic, Romeo stages a grand gesture comically dressed as a mix between Jose Rizal and a telenovela hero to stop her at the airport, declaring that he chooses love over beauty. And he confesses the when he was in Helena people envy him but when he was with Venus he love himself.

The film ends at a wedding of Romeo and Venus and the curse is broken. Their first child is born months later. The relatives anxiously gather, peering into the baby’s crib. Silence. Then they are screamed “The baby is adorable” and Daddy Samson fainting from joy.

But just before the credits roll, the baby gives a suspiciously evil giggle and flashes oddly shaped ears.

== Cast ==
=== Main ===
- Teddy Corpuz as Romeo
- Myrtle Sarrosa as Helena
- Donna Cariaga as Venus

=== Supporting ===
- Joey Marquez as Daddy Samson
- Lassy Marquez as Becky
- Nonong Ballinan as Junior
- Dawn Chang as Alicia
- Zeus Collins as Chito
- Luke Conde as Vince
- Nikko Natividad as Tony
- Michelle Liggayu as Balahura Queen
- Lexi Gonzales as Sleeping Beauty
- Krista Miller as Beauty Queen
- Moi Marcampo as Catriona
- Victor Anastacio as Doctor 1
- GB Labrador as Doctor 2
- Alex Calleja as Dr. Lito Sablayan
- Israel Buenaobra as Beggar
- Rica Marie Arbizo as Daddy Samson's Nurse
- James Caraan as Congressman
- Alma Moreno as Romeo's Mom
- Dumbo as Car Driver
- Shane Mag-abo as Model
- Elsa Droga as Applicant
- Matmat Centino as Applicant
- Odessa Jones as Applicant
- Tads Obach as Waiter
- Mark Baracael as Principal Sponsor
- Ara Altamira as Model

== Production ==
In an interview, Alex Calleja revealed that the producer, chairwoman and CEO of Regal Entertainment Roselle Monteverde offered to give him a film project.

He said (translated in English):

They always saw me with Vhong Navarro in films, writer, creative consultant, writing gags..

Ma'am Roselle saw me and she told me, "I will give you a film". I said that I don't know about technicals.

And she said that "I will give you a good director of photography and just do your vision."

Calleja also said that he picked Teddy Corpuz to lead on his film because of It's Showtime. He said that It's Showtime will help him to promote the film even though he resigned as a writer of the show in January 2019.

== Release ==
The film was theatrically released nationwide on March 20, 2019.

== Reception ==
Goldwin Reviews gave the film 1 out of 5 stars and wrote; "All actors made their funny antics. But not all acts are funny. Some jokes are new to me. Some never gets old. Few are quite silly. Few don’t make an impact. It’s a hit or miss throwing of punchlines while a story is moving forward."

Joseph R. Atilano of Philippine Daily Inquirer gave the film a highly positive review and rated it 10/10 and he said; "The main cast and supporting cast and everyone else who appeared in this movie were all on the same page. They clearly got along with each other onscreen and offscreen. They got the plot, they had fun filming this movie, and looked very confident in their respective roles whether big or small."

Oggs Cruz of Rappler gave the film a mixed to negative feedback and he wrote; "If only a small percentage of the jokes actually work, the film would have at least entertained all on the basis of a few laughs and chuckles."
