= Alex Calleja =

Filipino media personality

Alex Calleja (born October 6, 1972) is a Filipino stand-up comedian, director, podcaster, and screenwriter. He has worked as a writer for several television programs, including Goin' Bulilit, It's Showtime, and Umagang Kay Ganda.

== Life and career ==
Before becoming a stand-up comedian, he held various jobs, including construction work, serving as a porter at a thrift shop in Bangkal, Makati, and working as a fast-food crew member. He later joined SGS Far East Ltd. as a data processing officer, even before completing his studies, and continued his education while working as a student employee. After graduating, he taught at AMA University and, by 2005, was working as an IT programmer. He eventually attended a stand-up comedy workshop at Accenture and began performing in bars, where he was later discovered by ABS-CBN. His fame further soared after he placed as runner-up in Laugh Factory's Funniest Person in the World in 2016. He gained greater recognition during the COVID-19 pandemic, when his viral jokes online brought laughter to many viewers. His punchlines resonated widely, as they were rooted in his real-life experiences and those of ordinary Filipinos.

Calleja's career expanded as he became a television and radio host, as well as a podcaster. On February 7, 2025, he released his first Netflix comedy special, Tamang Panahon. It reached No. 1 and remained in Netflix Philippines' Top 10 for several weeks. His story was featured on Magpakailanman in 2025, with Sef Cadayona portraying him.

=== Controversy ===
Calleja was accused of joke plagiarism by screenwriter Chito Francisco, involving a car wash–related joke that gained attention during Calleja's Netflix special Tamang Panahon. In a Facebook post, Francisco alleged that one of his jokes had been used. Calleja responded by stating that the matter should have been addressed privately. He also shared screenshots of his car wash–themed jokes, which he claimed to have been performing since 2011. Francisco later issued a public apology, stating that the situation had escalated and that he wished to clarify the matter. He also urged bloggers and online users to delete his previous statements. In his apology, Francisco admitted fault and expressed remorse for the harm caused to Calleja. He acknowledged the possible legal implications of his actions and said he hoped his statement would help resolve the issue and bring closure between them.

== Filmography ==
=== As an actor ===
Television

| Year | Title | Role |
|---|---|---|
| 2011–2013 | Toda Max | Alex (85 episodes) |
| 2013 | Little Champ | Sarge |
| 2022 | BalitaOnenan | Seph "Patola" Balimbing |
| 2022 | Jose and Maria's Bonggang Villa | Joey Boy / Dr. Joe Marie Yan (2 episodes) |
| 2025 | Mga Batang Riles | Zeke Reyes (3 episodes) |
| 2026 | A Secret in Prague | Mr. President |

Film

| Year | Title | Role |
|---|---|---|
| 2011 | Dyagwar: Havey o waley | — |
| 2014 | Sa Ngalan ng Ama, Ina at mga Anak | Ka Silbio |
| 2017 | Mang Kepweng Returns | Gabe |
| 2017 | Woke Up Like This | Lance |
| 2018 | Walwal | Bernardo |
| 2018 | BuyBust | Teban |
| 2018 | Unli Life | John |
| 2019 | Papa Pogi | Dr. Lito Sablayan |
| 2024 | My Future You | Samalamig Vendor |
| 2025 | One Hit Wonder | Sir Erik |
| 2025 | Shake, Rattle & Roll: Evil Origins | Bano (segment "2025") |

=== As a production crew ===
Television

| Year | Title | Credit |
|---|---|---|
| 2013 | Toda Max | Contributing writer (as Alexander Victor Calleja) (43 episodes) |
| 2022 | BalitaOnenan | Writer |
| 2022–2024 | Jose and Maria's Bonggang Villa | Creative consultant (26 episodes) |

Film

| Year | Title | Credit |
|---|---|---|
| 2012 | The Reunion | Additional screenplay |
| 2017 | Woke Up Like This | Creative consultant |
| 2018 | Unli Life | Screenplay / creative consultant |
| 2019 | Papa Pogi | Story / screenplay |
| 2025 | Right Time (TV Special) | Writer |
