= Ninong Ry =

Filipino vlogger (born 1989)

- Born: Ryan Morales Reyes; April 19, 1989 (age 37); Malabon, Metro Manila, Philippines
- Education: De La Salle–College of Saint Benilde; St. James Academy–Malabon
- Occupations: Chef; content creator; market vendor (formerly)
- Children: 2 (1 adopted)

YouTube information
- Channel: Ninong Ry
- Years active: 2020–present
- Genres: Cooking; vlog
- Subscribers: 2.72 million
- Views: 491 million
- Last updated: March 15, 2026
- Website: ninongry.com

Ryan Morales Reyes (born April 19, 1989), known professionally as Ninong Ry, is a Filipino vlogger and chef known for his cooking videos that combine humor with culinary instruction. He gained success by posting his video featuring the Filipino dish Kare-kare on Facebook during the COVID-19 pandemic. He has also collaborated in cooking with celebrities such as Bea Alonzo, Arthur Nery, Cong TV, and Sarah Geronimo.

Reyes chose "Ninong" (godfather) as his screen name, considering it more uncommon than "Tito" (uncle), and made it a distinctive part of his branding. His audience is referred to as his "inaanak" (godchildren). He also expanded his career by authoring his first cookbook, Hindi Ito Cookbook ni Ninong Ry in May 2024.

== Early life and education ==
Ryan Morales Reyes was born and raised in Malabon. He previously worked as a restaurant chef before taking over the family's poultry business in the market after the passing of his father. He cites his father as his greatest influence, having honed his culinary skills as a child while assisting him in the kitchen. According to his vlogs and posts, he also has 12.5% Japanese ancestry.

He graduated with a Bachelor of Science in Hotel, Restaurant, and Institution Management (BS HRIM), majoring in Culinary arts, from De La Salle-College of Saint Benilde.

== Career ==
Reyes began sharing cooking videos in July 2020 as a way to pass time. His first video, which demonstrated how to cook Kare-kare, went viral within two months of being uploaded. Due to his popularity, he was named the 2021 calendar model for White Castle Whiskey, becoming the first male individual to be featured in the liquor brand's calendar campaign.

In June 2022, Reyes collaborated with celebrity chef Boy Logro for a cooking session in his kitchen, followed by sharing aspects of Logro's life after the cooking experience.

In October 2022, Reyes shared a memorable experience in one of his vlogs where he cooked for over 300 detainees at the San Juan City Jail Male Dormitory. He was joined by fellow vlogger Karen Bordador and partnered with Caritas Manila, a branch of Caritas Philippines, to be a part of the National Correctional Consciousness Week initiative.

Since 2023, Reyes has served as an endorser for Knorr Professional due to his prominent use of Knorr Chicken Powder in his videos. He has used the product since 2009 and has described it as a "best-kept secret" of restaurants and hotels. In September 2023, Filipino singer and songwriter Jose Mari Chan made an unexpected visit to Reyes' kitchen vlog.

Reyes played the role of Chef Kino in the 2023 horror anthology film Shake, Rattle & Roll Extreme, specifically in the "Mukbang" episode. He also participated in the Vietnamese reality show Let's Feast Vietnam (2023) with fellow content creator Dudut (Jaime Marino De Guzman) as his teammate.

In 2025, Reyes was introduced as a brand ambassador for PLDT Home Marketing Communications and Services, alongside online streamer Suzzysaur and singer-songwriter Maki.

== Personal life ==
Before starting his career as a vlogger, Reyes faced significant financial challenges and accumulated substantial debt. He recalled that he hoped to repay his debts through earnings from social media, with the intention of eventually returning to his previous work as a market vendor.

He suffered second and third degree burns to his face and arms following an accident during a breadmaking workshop, when an oven exploded. He expressed concern about his restaurant, medical expenses, and the potential long-term effects of his burns.

Reyes introduced his newborn son in May 2024. He had announced the pregnancy of his partner Belle Cruz in November 2023 and confirmed they were expecting a boy during a gender reveal party in December.

In July 2024, his home and studio setup in Malabon was submerged in flood due to Typhoon Carina.

== Filmography ==
Film
Year	Title	Role	Ref.
2023	Shake Rattle & Roll Extreme	Chef Kino	

Television
Year	Title	Role	Ref.
2023	Fast Talk with Boy Abunda	Himself	
2023	Family Feud	Himself	
2023	Bubble Gang	Himself	
2023	Let's Feast Vietnam	Himself	
2024	Regal Studio Presents	Mitoy	

== Book ==
- 2024 Hindi Ito Cookbook ni Ninong Ry, Self-published, ISBN 978-621-404-486-3
