= Woke Up Like This (film) =

2017 Philippine comedy film

- Directed by: John Elbert Ferrer
- Written by: Joma Labayen; Jeps Gallon
- Produced by: Lily Y. Monteverde; Roselle Y. Monteverde
- Starring: Vhong Navarro; Lovi Poe
- Cinematography: Mo Zee
- Edited by: J.J. Gloria; Noah Tonga
- Music by: Cesar Francis Concio
- Production company: Regal Entertainment
- Distributed by: Regal Entertainment
- Release date: August 23, 2017
- Language: Filipino
- Box office: ₱60 million (estimated)

Woke Up Like This is a 2017 Philippine comedy film directed by John Elbert Ferrer from a story and screenplay written by Joma Labayen and Jeps Gallon. Starring Vhong Navarro and Lovi Poe, the film follows a breadwinner man and a successful model, who are both prepared to receive their respective opportunities, extraordinarily switched their bodies.

Produced and distributed by Regal Entertainment, the film was theatrically released on August 23, 2017.

== Cast ==
Main cast

- Vhong Navarro as Nando Cruz/Sabrina Rodriguez (transform)
- Lovi Poe as Sabrina Rodriguez/Nando Cruz (transform)

Supporting cast

- Joey Marquez as Tsong/Tatay Cruz
- Bayani Agbayani as Baste
- Lou Veloso as Beggar/Apo Junior
- Raikko Mateo as Jolly
- Coraleen Waddell as Kitty
- Alyana Asistio as Hello/Chachi
- Johnny Revilla as Atty. Zandro Rodriguez, Sabrina's Father
- Dionne Monsanto as Kirsten
- Mitoy Yonting as Driver

Guest cast

- Billy Crawford
- Teddy Corpuz as Basketball referee
- Vice Ganda as Basketball Coach of Mean Star (Cameo)
- LA Tenorio
- Alex Calleja
- Arwind Santos (erroneously credited as Arwin Santos)

== Production ==
Woke Up Like This was announced to the public as early as March 2017. The Joel Ferrer-directed film was produced by Regal Films while its script was made by Joma Labayen and Jeps Gallon.

== Release ==
The grand premiere for Woke Up Like This took place on August 21, 2017.

== Reception ==
The film garnered ₱35 million box office gross in five days according to an August 29, 2017, report. By September 1, 2017, the film already grossed ₱60 million at the box office.
