= Lola Barang =

- Theatrical release poster
- Directed by: Joven Tan
- Screenplay by: Joven Tan
- Story by: Joven Tan
- Starring: Ronnie Lazaro; Gina Pareño
- Cinematography: Tejay Gonzales
- Edited by: Jason Cahapay
- Music by: Sherwin Castillo
- Production company: Total Ace Media
- Distributed by: Rafaella Films International
- Release date: August 6, 2025
- Running time: 88 minutes
- Country: Philippines
- Language: Filipino

Lola Barang is a 2025 Philippine horror film screenplayed and directed by Joven Tan. The leading star is Ronnie Lazaro with special participation of Gina Pareño. Lola Barang is the acting debut of Lizzie Aguinaldo.

== Cast ==
- Ronnie Lazaro as Joey Perez
- Gina Pareño as Lola Barbara
- Lizzie Aguinaldo
- Lou Veloso
- Richard Quan
- Allan Paule
- Mercedes Cabral
- Marlo Mortel
- Donna Cariaga
- Ronwaldo Martin
- Jomari Angeles
- Ahwel Paz

== Production ==
In an interview in their recent media gathering Ronnie Lazaro said that he didn't want to make a horror film at first but when director Joven Tan calls him he immediately say yes, he said that he trust the director's visions, horror elements etc. Lazaro also admitted that horror is not his comfort zone.

== Release ==
The film was theatrically released on August 6, 2025, under Rafaella Films International.
