= Lovers & Liars =

Philippine television drama series

- Title card
- Genre: Romantic drama
- Written by: Jose Javier Reyes; Noreen Capili; Trisha Mae Deles; Anthony Rodulfo; Riley Ramirez
- Directed by: Crisanto Aquino
- Starring: Claudine Barretto
- Ending theme: "Kung ang Puso" by Zephanie Dimaranan
- Country of origin: Philippines
- Original language: Tagalog
- No. of episodes: 32

Production
- Camera setup: Multiple-camera setup
- Production companies: GMA Entertainment Group; Regal Entertainment

Original release
- Network: GMA Network
- Release: November 20, 2023 – January 11, 2024

Lovers & Liars is a Philippine television drama romance series broadcast by GMA Network. Directed by Crisanto Aquino, it stars Claudine Barretto. It premiered on November 20, 2023 on the network's Telebabad line up. The series concluded on January 11, 2024, with a total of 32 episodes.

The series is streaming online on YouTube.

== Cast and characters ==
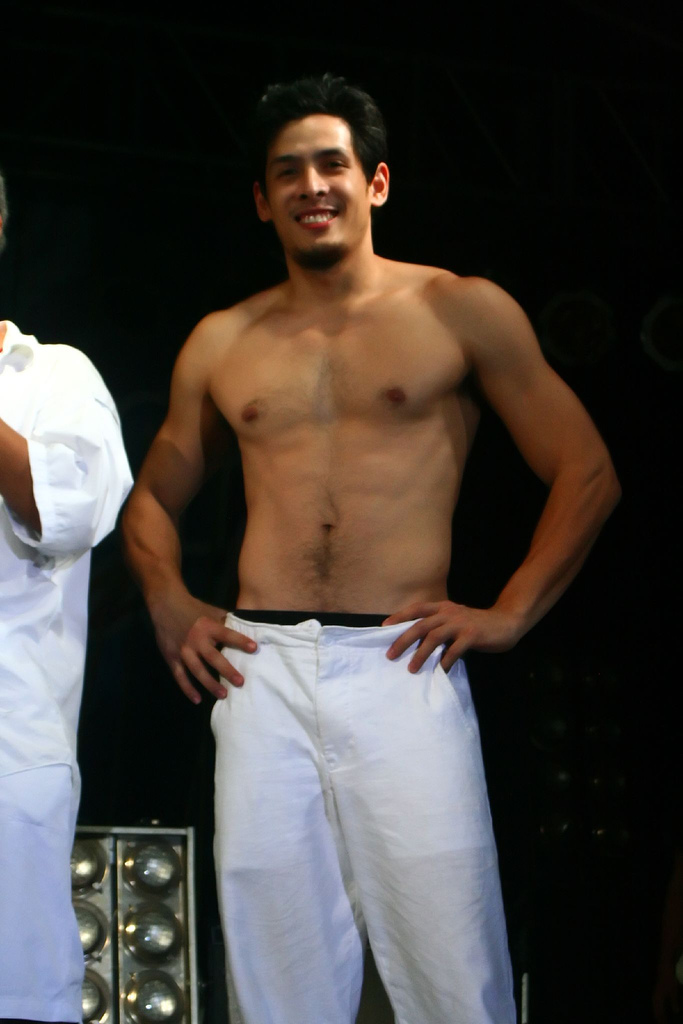
Christian Vasquez portrays Victor Tamayo.

Lead cast

- Claudine Barretto as Olivia "Via" Rosario-Laurente

Supporting cast

- Shaira Diaz as Annika "Nika" Aquino
- Yasser Marta as Carlos "Caloy" Marasigan
- Christian Vasquez as Victor Tamayo
- Lianne Valentin as Hannah Salalac
- Kimson Tan as Kelvin Chong
- Polo Ravales as Ronnie San Diego
- Michelle Vito as Andrea "Andeng" Sagrado
- Rob Gomez as Joseph Mentiroso
- Sarah Edwards as Katrina "Trina" Laurente

Recurring cast

- DJ Jhai Ho as Lucas "Lucy" de Leon
- Johnny Revilla as Ramon Laurente
- Rosh Barman as Pedro "Peds" Sagrado
- Ruslan Jacob as Kenneth Sagrado Mentiroso
- Lorraine Wong as Sally
- Eloisa Villamor as Jonalyn
- Andrew Gan as Celso
- John Uy as Jed
- Raymond Mabute as Robin Arguelles
- Marnie Lapuz as Lydia
- Christian Ty as Ar. Marcelo
- Jojo Nadela as Edison Chong
- Larkin Castor as Christian
- Omar Flores as Benjamin Mayoralgo
- Sherilyn Reyes-Tan as Stella Tamayo
- Mika Reins as Ysabelle Chua-Chong
- Ara Mina as Elizabeth Laurente
- Bernard Palanca as Martin
- Elijah Alejo as Mayette Salalac
- Althea Ablan as younger Via
- Will Ashley de Leon as younger Martin

== Production ==
Principal photography commenced on November 6, 2023.

== Ratings ==
According to AGB Nielsen Philippines' Nationwide Urban Television Audience Measurement People in television homes, the pilot episode of Lovers & Liars earned a 4.5% rating. The final episode of Lovers & Liars scored a 4.2% rating.
