= Mano Po Legacy: The Flower Sisters =

Philippine television drama series

- Title card
- Genre: Drama
- Created by: Jose Javier Reyes
- Written by: Lino Balmes; Trisha Mae Delez
- Directed by: Ian Loreños; Nick Olanka; Xion Lim
- Starring: Aiko Melendez; Beauty Gonzalez; Thea Tolentino; Angel Guardian
- Theme music composer: Decky Jazer Margaja
- Country of origin: Philippines
- Original language: Tagalog
- No. of episodes: 47

Production
- Executive producers: Lily Monteverde; Roselle Monteverde
- Producer: Rainier P. Alvarez
- Editors: Jan Rainard Chang; Princess Orveen Calderon
- Camera setup: Multiple-camera setup
- Running time: 45 minutes
- Production companies: GMA Entertainment Group; Regal Entertainment

Original release
- Network: GMA Network
- Release: October 31, 2022 – January 13, 2023

Related
- Mano Po Legacy: The Family Fortune; Mano Po Legacy: Her Big Boss

Mano Po Legacy: The Flower Sisters (transl. hand please legacy: the flower sisters) is a Philippine television drama series broadcast by GMA Network. The series is the third installment of Mano Po Legacy. Directed by Ian Loreños, it stars Aiko Melendez, Beauty Gonzalez, Thea Tolentino and Angel Guardian all in the title roles. It premiered on October 31, 2022 on the network's Telebabad line up. The series concluded on January 13, 2023, with a total of 47 episodes.

The series is streaming online on YouTube.

== Cast and characters ==
Cast

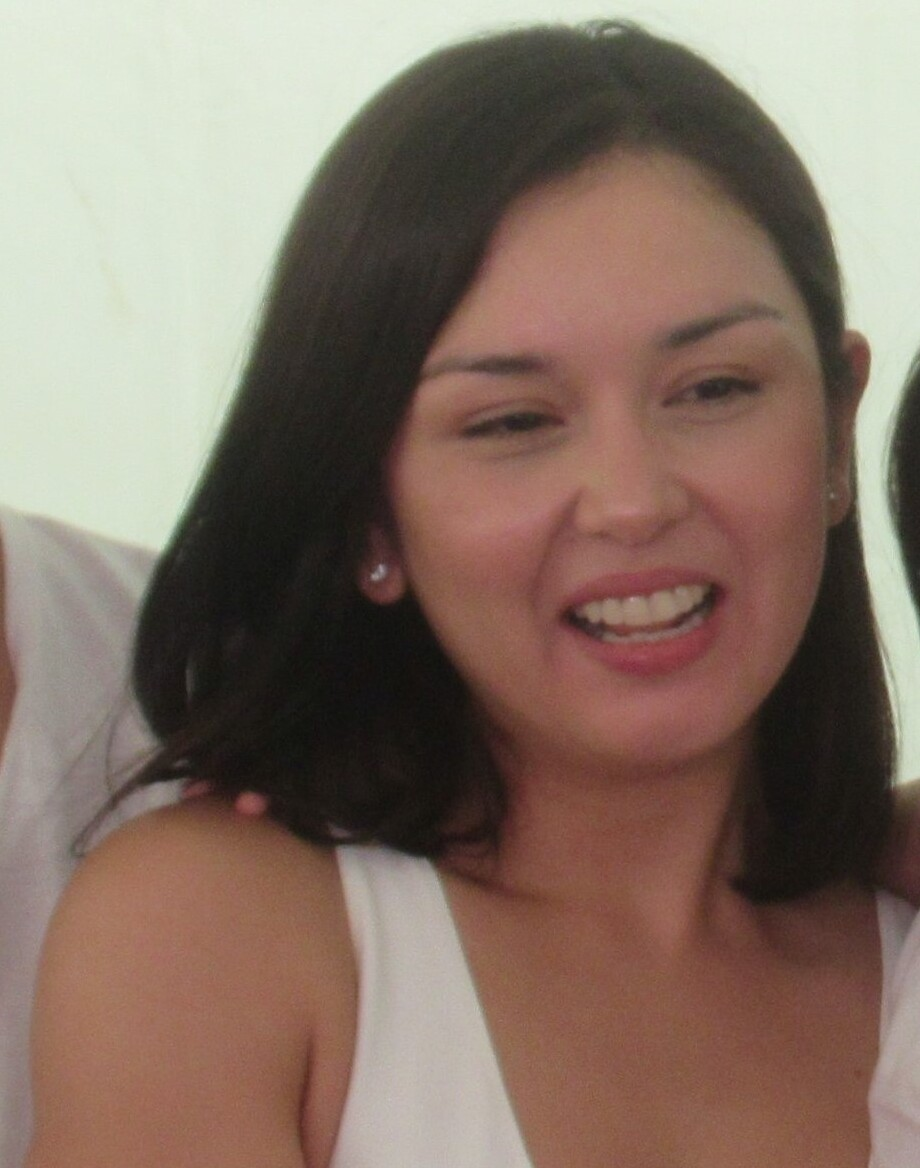
Beauty Gonzalez

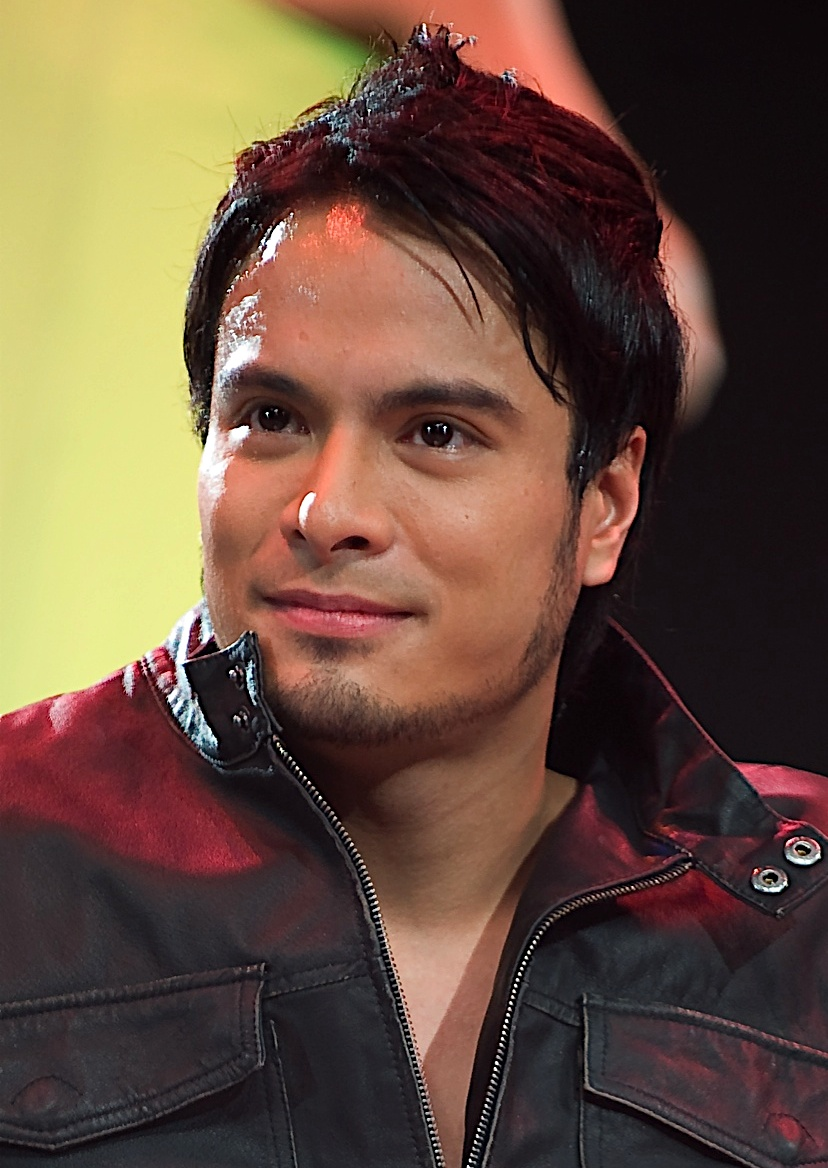
Rafael Rosell

Lead cast

- Aiko Melendez as Lily Yap Chua-Tan
- Beauty Gonzalez as Violet Ty Chua-Gomez
- Thea Tolentino as Dahlia Morales Chua
- Angel Guardian as Iris Ong Chua

Supporting cast

- Rafael Rosell as Julian Gomez
- Isabel Rivas as Aurora Ty-Chua
- Maila Gumila as Divina Chua
- Tanya Garcia as Marilou Ong
- Marcus Madrigal as Redmond Tan
- Sue Prado as Belinda Morales
- Bodjie Pascua as Felino Go
- Miggs Cuaderno as James Petersen Chua Tan
- Will Ashley as Andrew James Chua Tan
- Carlo San Juan as Elvin Delos Santos
- Mika Reins as Kayla Gomez
- Casie Banks as Jade Lee
- Dustin Yu as Kenneth Chan
- Kimson Tan as Steven Yu
- Shecko Apostol as Benjo Que

Recurring cast

- Adrienne Vergara as Clarisse
- Gertrude Hahn as Corrine
- Dovee Park as Trisha
- Sunshine Teodoro as Precy
- AZ Martinez as Jessica Tang
- Johnny Revilla as Miguel Gomez
- JC Tiuseco as Robert Collantes
- Samby Magno as Joni

Guest cast

- Mikee Quintos as Carmen Yap-Chua
- Lloyd Samartino as Leopoldo Go Chua
- Paul Salas as younger Leopoldo
- Yvette Sanchez as younger Lily
- Althea Ablan as younger Violet
- Adriana Agcaoili as older Aurora
- Sophia Senoron as younger Aurora
- Cheska Fausto as younger Divina
- Gian Magdangal as older Felino
- Larkin Castor as younger Felino
- Small Laude as herself
- Sandro Muhlach as Charlie Ty Chua
- Nicole Laurel Asensio as Celeste Villagracia
- Bella Thompson as Paula
- Anikka Camaya as Pamela dela Cruz
- Ray An Dulay as Salcedo
- Boy Laguipo as Arturo Bendigo

== Ratings ==
According to AGB Nielsen Philippines' Nationwide Urban Television Audience Measurement People in television homes, the pilot episode of Mano Po Legacy: The Flower Sisters earned a 6.2% rating. The final episode scored a 9.6% rating.

== Accolades ==
Accolades received by Mano Po Legacy: The Flower Sisters
| Year | Award | Category | Recipient | Result | Ref. |
|---|---|---|---|---|---|
| 2025 | 37th PMPC Star Awards for Television | Best New Male TV Personality | Larkin Castor | Nominated | |
