= Kim Domingo =

Filipino actress, model and singer (born 1995)

- Born: Kimberly Domingo Mazon; February 3, 1995 (age 31); Quezon City, Philippines
- Education: Our Lady of Fatima University
- Occupations: Actress, model, singer
- Years active: 2000–present
- Agent(s): Sparkle GMA Artist Center (2015–2022); Freelancer (2024–present)
- Television: ABS-CBN; GMA Network; TV5 Network
- Modeling information
- Height: 1.71 m (5 ft 7 in)

Kimberly Domingo Mazon (born February 3, 1995) is a Filipino actress, model and singer. She played the leading antagonist in Juan Happy Love Story, Tsuperhero and Super Ma'am. She is currently a freelance artist.

In 2026, romance-thriller series A Secret in Prague as Alexandria "Alex" Cortez. Her character plays an action-oriented government agent who is deeply entangled in the show's central espionage plot.

== Early life and education ==
Domingo was born on February 3, 1995, and was raised in Novaliches, Quezon City. She is the only child to a French father, Guy Belleville, and a Filipino mother, Fina Domingo. Since her parents separated and never got married, she possesses her mother's surname. According to her, she was a "Lola's (Grandma's) girl" raised in a strict household single-handedly by her grandmother. She graduated from elementary school at the San Agustin Elementary School, Quezon City, where Domingo said she was a shy pupil. She attended Our Lady of Fatima University and took up dentistry.

== Career ==
Domingo rose to prominence with her dubsmash of the song "Twerk It Like Miley" in 2014. She signed a contract with GMA Network's talent agency the following year, and landed roles on Juan Happy Love Story and Bubble Gang, where she is currently a mainstay. Domingo appeared on the cover of FHM Philippines' December 2015, and January 2017 issues.

Domingo signed a recording contract with GMA Records in August 2016. She released her debut and only single "Know Me" featuring international rapper C-Tru. Domingo was introduced by Ginebra San Miguel as their 2017 calendar girl in October 2016.

From 2024 to 2025, Domingo portrayed Madonna on FPJ's Batang Quiapo.

== Filmography ==
=== Film ===
Year	Title	Role	Ref.
2016	Magtanggol		
2017	Mang Kepweng Returns	Alyssa	

=== Television ===
Year	Title	Role	Ref.
2000	Eat Bulaga!	Little Miss Philippines Contestant / Fourth runner-up	
2012	Wil Time Bigtime	Herself / Money Girl	
2015–2022	Bubble Gang	Herself / Cast member	
2016	Juan Happy Love Story	Agatha Samaniego	
2016	Karelasyon: Rehas	Maya	
2017	D' Originals	Sofia Abella	
2017	Magpakailanman: The Kim Domingo story	Herself	
2017–2018	Super Ma'am	Mabelle Henerala	
2017–2018	Super Ma'am	Avenir Segovia	
2018	Tadhana: My Korean Fairy Tale	Kristel	
2018	Inday Will Always Love You	Chuchay	
2018	Magpakailanman: Asawa Ko ang Bayaw Ko	Liezel	
2019	TODA One I Love	Vicky	
2019	Hanggang sa Dulo ng Buhay Ko	Katya De Jesus Calderon	
2019	Hanggang sa Dulo ng Buhay Ko	Naomi Espiritu	
2021	Regal Studio Presents: Bros B4 Rose	Rosa	
2022	Start-Up PH	Stephanie Rios	
2024–present	ASAP XP	Herself / Co-host / Performer	
2024–2025	FPJ's Batang Quiapo	Madonna	
2026	A Secret in Prague	Alexandria "Alex" Cortez	

=== Microdrama ===
Year	Title	Role	Ref.
2025	My Husband Killed Me Three Times	Ginnie Herrera	
2025	My Husband Killed Me Three Times	Genevieve Lendir	

== Discography ==
=== Single ===
Year	Title	Featured artist	Label
2016	Know Me	C. Tru	GMA Records

Preceded by Ellen Adarna	FHM Cover Girl; January 2017	Succeeded by Emmanuelle Vera And Julz Savard
