= Suzzysaur =

Filipino gamer

- Born: Suzzane Ezra Irasga; July 17, 1995 (age 31)
- Education: ICCT Colleges (BS)
- Occupations: Twitch streamer; media personality
- Title: CEO of Rumble Royale

Twitch information
- Channel: Suzzysaur
- Games: League of Legends; Valorant; Among Us
- Followers: 21.2 thousand

YouTube information
- Channel: SuzzyVideoDiary
- Subscribers: 34.9 thousand
- Views: 1.6 million
- Last updated: November 14, 2025

Suzzane Ezra Irasga-Gubatan (born July 17, 1995), better known by her online moniker Suzzysaur, is a Filipino gamer and online streamer. She is one of the first streamers under Rumble Royale, a gaming community in the Philippines, and is also known for playing League of Legends.

== Early life ==
Suzzane Ezra Irasga was born on July 17, 1995. She raised in a family with a strong interest in gaming. During her childhood, her mother developed Hepatitis B, while her father worked to support her three siblings. Irasga studied for a Bachelor of Science in computer engineering at ICCT Colleges and began broadcasting her games as a side hustle to support herself through school.

== Career ==
Irasga's interest in online gaming began during her high school in 2013, influenced by the family's gaming habits. She became particularly interested after seeing the brother play League of Legends.

In 2019, Irasga attended the League of Legends All-Star Event in Las Vegas as Southeast Asia's sole content creator. The event also featured Philippine player and her now husband Eric Allen "Exosen" Gubatan and international personalities such as Lee "Faker" Sang-hyeok and Pokimane, competing in tournaments, charity events, and special game modes.

In 2025, she became the CEO of Rumble Royale, a creative agency that collaborates with some of Asia's top gaming brands on content, events, and production. In August, Irasga was introduced as a brand ambassador for PLDT Home Marketing Communications and Services, alongside food content creator Ninong Ry and singer-songwriter Maki. The announcement was made with senior executives from PLDT Home, including John Palanca, Roy Victor Añonuevo, and Ina Pineda.

== Personal life ==
During a League of Legends tournament in Los Angeles, Irasga met gamer Eric Allen "Exosen" Gubatan, who became her husband. They live in Quezon City with their two daughters.
