= Mano Po Legacy: The Family Fortune =

2022 Philippine television drama series

- Title card
- Genre: Drama
- Created by: Jose Javier Reyes
- Written by: Ron Dulatre; Lino Balmes
- Directed by: Ian Loreños
- Creative director: Easy Ferrer
- Starring: Barbie Forteza; Sunshine Cruz; Maricel Laxa
- Country of origin: Philippines
- Original language: Tagalog
- No. of episodes: 40

Production
- Executive producers: Lily Monteverde; Roselle Monteverde
- Production location: Metro Manila
- Editors: Lance Justiza Lozano; Jayvee Kang Margaja; Marquis Herradura
- Camera setup: Multiple-camera setup
- Running time: 45–50 minutes
- Production companies: GMA Entertainment Group; Regal Entertainment

Original release
- Network: GMA Network
- Release: January 3 – February 25, 2022

Related
- Mano Po Legacy: Her Big Boss; Mano Po Legacy: The Flower Sisters

Mano Po Legacy: The Family Fortune (transl. hand please legacy: the family fortune) is a 2022 Philippine television drama series broadcast by GMA Network. The series is the first installment of Mano Po Legacy. Directed by Ian Loreños, it stars Barbie Forteza, Sunshine Cruz and Maricel Laxa. It premiered on January 3, 2022, on the network's Telebabad line up. The series concluded on February 25, 2022, with a total of 40 episodes.

The series is streaming online on YouTube.

== Cast and characters ==
Cast

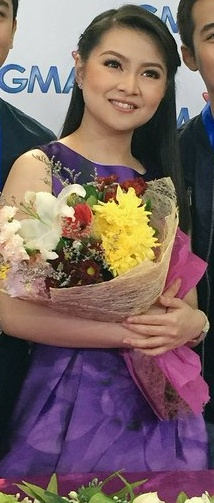
Barbie Forteza

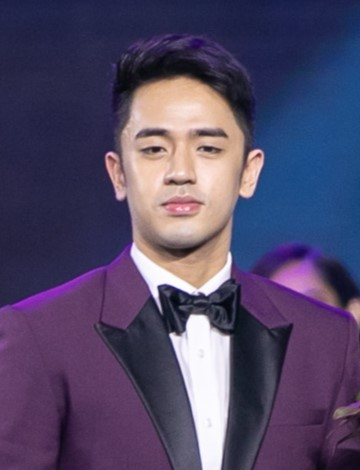
David Licauco

Lead cast

- Barbie Forteza as Steffanie "Steffy" Dy
- Sunshine Cruz as Cristine Yang Chan
- Maricel Laxa as Valerie Lim / Rosemarie Lim

Supporting cast

- Boots Anson-Roa as Consuelo Yang-Chan
- David Licauco as Anton Sy Chan
- Rob Gomez as Joseph Garces Chan
- Nikki Co as Jameson Lim Chan
- Dustin Yu as Kenneth Sy Chan
- Darwin Yu as Leo Uy-Evangelista
- Casie Banks as Jade Lee

Recurring cast

- Almira Muhlach as Elizabeth Sy-Chan
- David Chua as Philip Lo
- Victor Basa as Allan Rivera
- Lovely Rivero as Mila Rose de Guia
- Marnie Lapuz as Fides Mercado
- Earl Ignacio as Johnny Dy
- Marissa Sanchez as Merlita Dy
- Kate Yalung as Myla Capistrano
- Ann Colis as Margarita "Maggie" Cruz-Rivera
- Arkin del Rosario as Carl Yap
- Jay Glorioso as Lirio Lim
- Mel Caluag as Romina "Mina" Lim
- Sue Prado as Elena "Ellen" Garces
- Arnold Reyes as Martin Valderrama
- Robert Seña as Edison Y. Chan
- Derick Lauchengco as Peter Ang
- VJ Mendoza as Kerwin Torres
- Anikka Camaya as Pamela dela Cruz
- Francis Mata as Ronaldo Sy
- Ken Chan as Richard Lim
- Bianca Umali as Irene Pacheco
- Ray An Dulay as Salcedo

== Ratings ==
According to AGB Nielsen Philippines' Nationwide Urban Television Audience Measurement People in television homes, the pilot episode of Mano Po Legacy: The Family Fortune earned a 6.9% rating.
