= Mano Po Legacy: Her Big Boss =

2022 Philippine television drama series

- Title card
- Genre: Drama; Romantic comedy
- Created by: Jose Javier Reyes
- Written by: Ron Dulatre; Lino Balmes
- Directed by: Easy Ferrer; Joey de Guzman
- Creative director: Ricky Lee
- Starring: Bianca Umali; Ken Chan; Kelvin Miranda
- Theme music composer: Willy Cruz
- Country of origin: Philippines
- Original language: Tagalog
- No. of episodes: 50

Production
- Executive producers: Lily Monteverde; Roselle Monteverde
- Editors: Jayvee Kang Margaja; Lance Justiza Lozano; Mandy Alano; Joe Joseph Llona
- Camera setup: Multiple-camera setup
- Running time: 40–45 minutes
- Production companies: GMA Entertainment Group; Regal Entertainment

Original release
- Network: GMA Network
- Release: March 14 – June 2, 2022

Related
- Mano Po Legacy: The Family Fortune; Mano Po Legacy: The Flower Sisters

Mano Po Legacy: Her Big Boss (transl. hand please legacy: her big boss) is a 2022 Philippine television drama romantic comedy series broadcast by GMA Network. The series is the second installment of Mano Po Legacy. Directed by Easy Ferrer and Joey de Guzman, it stars Bianca Umali, Ken Chan and Kelvin Miranda. It premiered on March 14, 2022 on the network's Telebabad line up. The series concluded on June 2, 2022, with a total of 50 episodes.

The series is streaming online on YouTube.

== Cast and characters ==
Cast

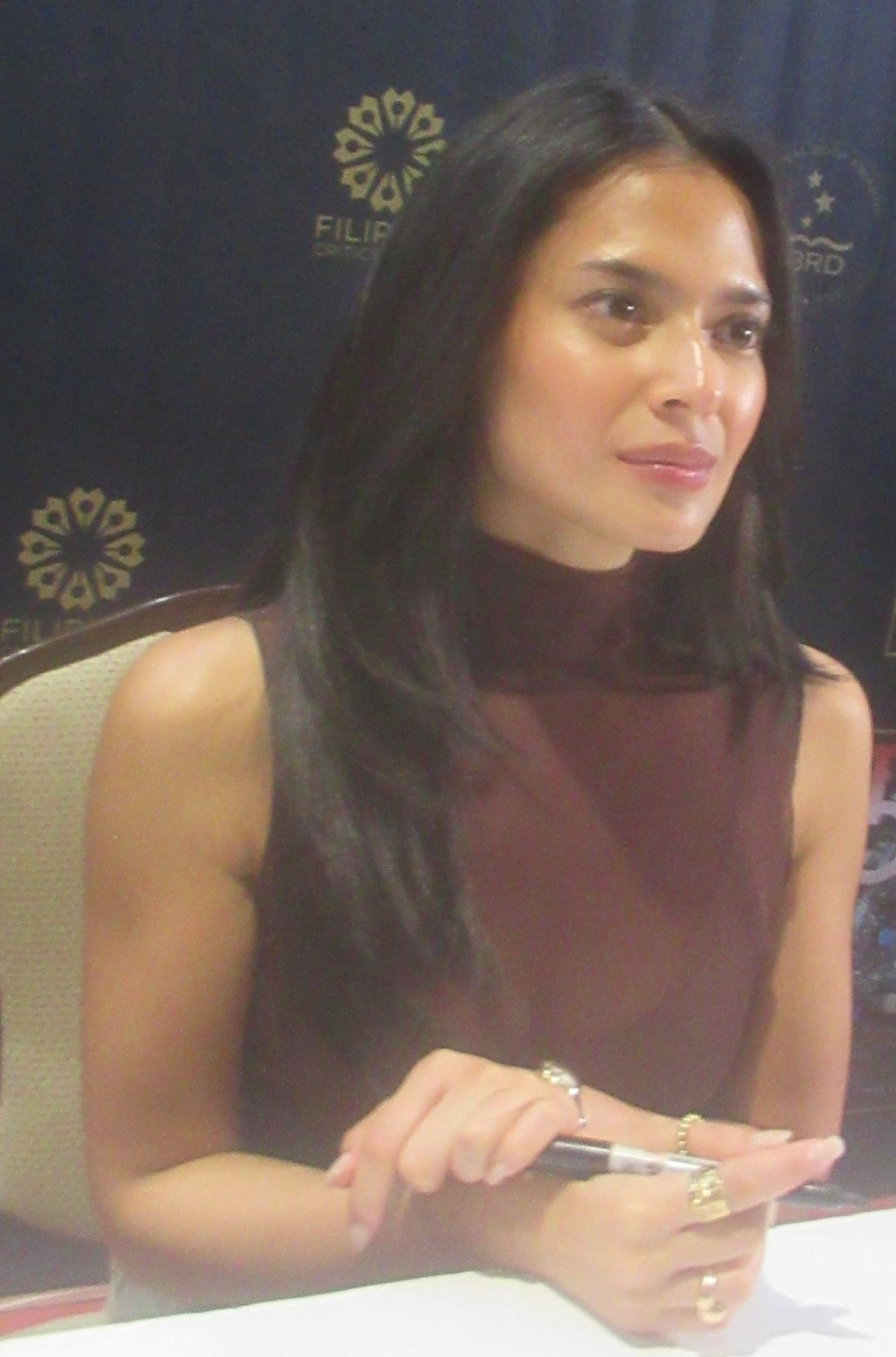
Bianca Umali

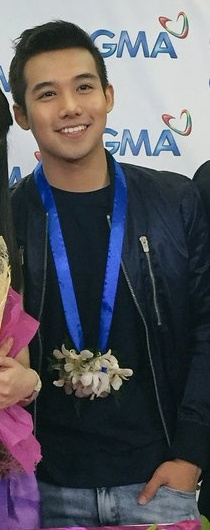
Ken Chan

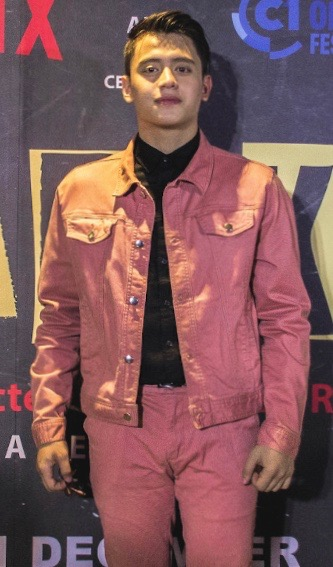
Kelvin Miranda

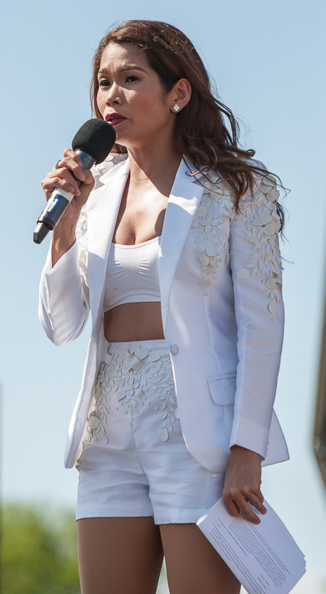
Pokwang

Lead cast

- Bianca Umali as Irene Pacheco
- Ken Chan as Richard Lim
- Kelvin Miranda as Nestor Lorenzo

Supporting cast

- Pokwang as Rebecca "Becca" Pacheco
- Arlene Muhlach as Adelina "Adeng" Pacheco
- Ricardo Cepeda as Alexander "Alex" Lim
- Marina Benipayo as Elaine Dy-Lim
- Teejay Marquez as Raven Lim
- Tyrone Tan as David G. Tan
- Blue Cailles as Lemuel "Lem" Carrera
- Sarah Holmes as Rachel Lim
- Sarah Edwards as Princess Grace Que
- Haley Dizon as Charlene Ang
- Jem Manicad as "Solenn" Baluyot
- Phi Palmos as "April" Ligot

Recurring cast

- Maricar de Mesa as Mia Flores
- Minnie Aguilar as Natalia Lorenzo
- Lime Aranya as Marla Pacheco
- Julian Roxas as Nimrod Layco
- Peewee O'Hara as Noemi Capistrano
- Lotlot Bustamante as Mylene Bautista
- Donna Cariaga as Guia Sugcang
- Rob Gomez as Joseph Chan
- Rolando Innocencio as Froilan Andrade
- Shermaine Santiago as Elise Ty
- Francis Mata as Ronaldo Sy
- Che Ramos as Millicent Rodrigo
- Christian Ty as Elmer
- Paul Cervantes as Martin
- Shanicka Arganda as Hannah
- Yesh Burce as Sophia Wong

== Ratings ==
According to AGB Nielsen Philippines' Nationwide Urban Television Audience Measurement People in television homes, the pilot episode of Mano Po Legacy: Her Big Boss earned a 7% rating.
