= Mano Po Legacy =

Philippine media franchise

- Created by: Jose Javier Reyes

Films and television
- Television series: Mano Po Legacy: The Family Fortune (2022); Mano Po Legacy: Her Big Boss (2022); Mano Po Legacy: The Flower Sisters (2022–23)

Mano Po Legacy is a Philippine television drama series broadcast by GMA Network. The series is a television adaptation of the Mano Po movie franchise produced by Regal Entertainment.

== Overview ==
Series	Episodes	Originally aired	
Series	Episodes	First aired	Last aired
Mano Po Legacy: The Family Fortune	40	January 3, 2022	February 25, 2022
Mano Po Legacy: Her Big Boss	50	March 14, 2022	June 2, 2022
Mano Po Legacy: The Flower Sisters	47	October 31, 2022	January 13, 2023

== See also ==
- Mano Po film series
