= A Secret in Prague =

Philippine romantic thriller television series

- Genre: Romantic thriller; Action; Drama; Soap opera
- Created by: Mark Duane Angos; Enrique Gil
- Written by: Mark Duane Angos
- Directed by: Barry Gonzalez; Paco Sta. Maria
- Starring: Enrique Gil; Andrea Brillantes
- Country of origin: Philippines
- Original language: Filipino
- No. of episodes: 115

Production
- Production location: Prague
- Camera setup: Single-camera
- Running time: 23–36 minutes
- Production companies: TV5 Entertainment; Slingshot Studios

Original release
- Network: TV5
- Release: April 27 – October 2, 2026
- Network: Kapamilya Channel; A2Z; All TV 2
- Release: July 27 – October 2, 2026

A Secret in Prague is a Philippine television drama romantic thriller series broadcast by TV5 and Kapamilya Channel. Directed by Barry Gonzalez and Paco Sta. Maria, it stars Enrique Gil and Andrea Brillantes. It aired on TV5's TodoMax Primetime line up and worldwide on Kapatid Channel from April 27 to October 2, 2026. Also broadcast on Kapamilya Channel's Primetime Bida line up from July 27 to October 2, 2026.

== Premise ==
An ordinary guy falls in love with the daughter of a mafia boss, forcing him to choose between protecting his own family or betraying the woman he loves.

== Cast and characters ==
=== Main cast ===
- Enrique Gil as Michael "Mikoy" Pinagpala
- Andrea Brillantes as Chiara "Kiara" Valtrovi / La Fornarina
  - Cailey Magno as young Kiara

=== Supporting cast ===
- Kim Domingo as Alexandria "Alex" Cortez
- Cedrick Juan as Sianong
- Joel Torre as Norberto Ruiz
- Lorna Tolentino as Mama Yaya / Vicky Corales
- Edu Manzano as Mario Pinagpala
- Ruben Maria Soriquez as Viktor Valtrovi
- K Brosas as Donabel Valtrovi
- Arlene Muhlach as Tess Pinagpala
- Mark Ian as Angelito Pinagpala
- Queenay Mercado as Sophie
- Ace John Espinosa as Agent Kian
- Benjie Paras as Tintin Salazar
- Carlos Agassi as Jethro "Jepoy" Salamangkero / Cocoy
- Sam Coloso as Carlota
- Eian Rances as Owen
- Serena Magiliw as Betchay
- Pat Tingjuy as Dara
- Spencer Capistrano as Rafa
- Jericho Del Rosario as Lawrence
- Albert Nicolas as Ben
- Richard Quan as Engineer Will
- Blake Salcedo as Atty. Salazar
- Monique Vazquez as Luisa Mae
- Karel Chvojka as Mr. Vicek
- Robert Kopl
- Jan Krcmár
- Stepan Sikl
- Barbora Geletey
- Anna Jeníková
- Margareta Abena
- Hershey Neri
- Matteo Guidicelli as Donatello Moraviano "Il Pittore"
- Martina Marinaz as La Morte Bianca / Isabelle
- Petr Pavel
- Andrej Babiš
- Alex Calleja as Mr. President
- Christian Vasquez as Alex's Dad
- Mark "Big Mak" Andaya as Jake
- Dylan Menor as Ramboy Corales
- Viveika Ravanes as Leonila
- Inday Fatima as Alice
- Niño Muhlach

== Episodes ==
No.	Title	Original release date
1	"Pilot"	April 27, 2026
Mikoy leaves his hometown to work abroad in Prague. While working as a waiter, he runs into trouble and the enigmatic Chiara saves him from some thugs.
2	"Welcome to the Family"	April 28, 2026
Viktor welcomes Mikoy into the Valtrovi family, but Chiara tries to shield the waiter from danger. Meanwhile, Agent Alex watches from a distance.
3	"Leverage"	April 30, 2026
As Agents Alex and Sianong aggressively pull Mikoy into their surveillance, Alex crosses the line and involves Mikoy's family back home.
4	"A Difficult Choice"	April 30, 2026
Mikoy refuses to bend to the agents' threats and must choose between protecting his family or betraying Chiara and the powerful Valtrovi family.
5	"Home Court"	May 1, 2026
Realizing he is no spy, Mikoy decides to bring the mission back to his home turf. But will his hometown of Cebu City prove charming enough for Chiara?
6	"A Secret in Cebu"	May 4, 2026
As Mikoy and Chiara receive a grand welcome in Cebu, the rest of the Valtrovi soon arrive and Agent Alex continues her investigation.
7	"Getting to Know You"	May 5, 2026
While the Valtrovi enjoy Pinoy hospitality, the Pinagpalas wonder if Mikoy's new job is as good as it seems. Agent Kian uncovers a serious threat.
8	"Direct Command"	May 6, 2026
Viktor receives orders from Sicily. With Agent Kian in danger, Agent Alex and Sianong set out to seek justice. Meanwhile, Mikoy enjoys a makeover.
9	"The New Role"	May 7, 2026
Now sporting a new look, Mikoy visits his younger brother and has an uncomfortable family dinner. Agent Alex infiltrates Vertex Global.
10	"Not Who She Seems"	May 8, 2026
The agents keep their eyes on Mikoy as he starts his new role at Vertex. But while the Pinagpalas enjoy their new life, something seems off with Chiara.
11	"A Glimpse Into the Past"	May 11, 2026
Mikoy settles into his new role at Vertex, but he may be in over his head. Meanwhile, Chiara's past and Viktor Valtrov's true nature come to light.
12	"Secrets"	May 12, 2026
A close call puts Mikoy on edge as Chiara bonds with his family. Angelito's mystery girl resurfaces, and secrets threaten to unravel everything.
13	"New Introductions"	May 13, 2026
Mikoy meets the rest of the team and begins intense training with Agent Alex. Meanwhile, the Valtrovis clash over family expectations and dynamics.
14	"Old Friends, New Deals"	May 14, 2026
Mikoy and Chiara strike a new deal as she rises in the Moraviano syndicate. Caught off guard, Mikoy turns to Agent Alex for relationship advice.
15	"A Night Off"	May 15, 2026
Mikoy and Chiara go on a date, while Angelito reaches out to his mystery girl. Agent Alex and Syano share a heart-to-heart over their own struggles.
16	"A Memorable Night"	May 18, 2026
Agent Kian rejoins the team as the Vertex Global grand reveal party kicks off. Mikoy takes the stage, but unwelcome gate-crashers crash the event.
17	"Hangover"	May 19, 2026
The Vertex party spirals into chaos as the Valtrovis scramble to escape. Donabel is captured, but the family's strength is underestimated.
18	"Do You Remember?"	May 20, 2026
Mikoy wakes up next to Chiara with no memory of the night before. The Valtrovis regroup with La Morte Bianca as the agents close in on their next move.
19	"A Reliable Source"	May 21, 2026
The agency debates who rescued Donabel as a "reliable source" delivers a warning to the Pinagpalas. Meanwhile, Chiara bonds with Nanay Tess.
20	"Friend or Foe?"	May 22, 2026
A foreign asset introduces La Fornarina to the agents — but can he be trusted? Meanwhile,a senator's visit to the agency brings uncertain news.
21	"Old Friends, New Problems"	May 25, 2026
Agents Alex and Sianong meet with Director Ruiz and voice their concerns over the agency's closure. Chiara turns Donabel for motherly advice.
22	"The Other Mario"	May 26, 2026
During a family meal, the Valtrovis discuss their situation in the country while Chiara begins to doubt Mikoy. Meanwhile, Tatay Mario lands in trouble.
23	"Getting Closer"	May 27, 2026
Mikoy grows closer to Alex, building trust as they uncover more about La Fornarina. Angelito finally gets the chance to meet Sophie's father.
24	"Girls' Night, Boys' Trouble"	May 28, 2026
During a night out, Mikoy introduces Chiara to the rest of his friends, and she immediately takes a liking to one person in particular: Alex.
25	"Meet the Family"	May 29, 2026
Tensions rise at the agency over a missing asset. Mikoy and Chiara spend time with her family, while Angelito and Sophie continue to grow closer.
26	"Realizations"	June 1, 2026
Viktor and Chiara clash over a disagreement. Sophie works on a favor for Angelito, while a senator delivers new that shakes up the agency.
27	"Fathers and Daughters"	June 2, 2026
The agents receive crucial intel as a plan hits a snag. Director Ruiz makes time for his daughter, while Viktor and Chiara's conflict deepens.
28	"Conversations"	June 3, 2026
The senator has a serious talk with the agents as Alex and Sinong clash over a lead. Mikoy and Chiara decide to take the next step together.
29	"New Hires"	June 4, 2026
Director Ruiz returns as the team gains a new member. Mikoy asks Chiara to share more about her life, while she and Viktor remain at odds.
30	"Changing Directions"	June 5, 2026
Viktor comes clean to Donabel. Alex pushes forward with her suspicions, but new intel steers the team another way. Chiara helps Mikoy prep for work.
31	"New Bonds"	June 8, 2026
Agents Alex and Sianong report back after trailing a new suspect. Mikoy bonds with Carlotta, while Chiara settles into a more domestic role.
32	"A Surpise Visit"	June 9, 2026
Alex and Chiara bond during a surprise visit. The general receives word about his old friend, Isidro, while Carlotta delivers a report to Viktor.
33	"Secrets in Play"	June 10, 2026
A game among friends exposes secrets, and Carlotta's lead pays off. Sianong confronts Alex, sparking a realization about her true feelings.
34	"The Missing Agent"	June 11, 2026
Alex is uncharacteristically late for work, so Sianong goes looking for her. Back at the Vertex offices, Mikoy receives a personal visit from Viktor.
35	"Choosing Sides"	June 12, 2026
Mikoy finally reunites with the agents after weeks on his own. The Valtrovi family feud comes to a head with Chiara and Viktor locked in a standoff.
36	"Plans Interrupted"	June 15, 2026
Chiara tells Mikot she's going away — but things don't go as planned. Meanwhile, Mario returns to Manila to see Mikoy after a long absence.
37	"The Loose End"	June 16, 2026
Viktor mistakenly leaves a dangerous loose end dangling, and Brusco shows Chiara his softer side while revealing as unanticipated discovery.
38	"Family History"	June 17, 2026
Agent Alex learns about Valtrovi family's surprising history while Chiara and MIkoy uncover a treasure trove of buried secrets.
39	"A Grave Decision"	June 18, 2026
As Chiara and Mikoy fall deeper into deep trouble, doubts about loyalty drive them wildly different paths — and Mikoy's stubbornness shocks everyone.
40	"A Message from Italy"	June 19, 2026
Viktor receives a disturbing message from La Morte Bianca, and the agents clash once again over how Mikoy and Alex are handling their case.
41	"The Painter Arrives"	June 22, 2026
Alex and Sianong hit an impasse. Viktor confides his worries to Donabel as mysterious painter pays him a visit — and Mario tells Mikoy about his past.
42	"Hidden Plans"	June 23, 2026
After the mission goes awry, an emotional Sianong confronts General Noberto. La Fornarina meets the Painter — and Viktor's secret plan stuns Chiara.
43	"Roadblock"	June 24, 2026
Sianong shares his new plan with Alex while she recovers. MIkoy, after being ambushed while traveling, realizes that he may have been set up.
44	"The Chase"	June 25, 2026
La Fornarina leads a chase as the agents scramble to follow. After failed attempts, Mikoy and Chiara finally talk — and a confession sips out.
45	"The Reunion"	June 26, 2026
Over a midnight snack, hard truths finally emerge between Mikoy and Chiara. Alex makes a command decision as Sianong scrambles to secure the scene.
46	"Against Orders"	June 29, 2026
Alex rebels against General Noberto's decisions, and Sianong resolutely sides with her. Viktor makes his true feelings about Mikoy clear.
47	"No Bounds"	June 30, 2026
Sianong pledges his support for Alex during their new mission. Viktor and Donabel launch their own investigation. Chiara opens up to new hope.
48	"A New Deal"	July 1, 2026
Chiara's instincts take over as Mikoy strikes a new deal. Sianong shows a new side while following a lead, and the Valtrovis make a long overdue visit.
49	"The Painter's End"	July 2, 2026
Time may be running out for Chiara and Mikoy's new beginning. The Painter finds what he's looking for — or does he? Mario calls in an old favor.
50	"The Painter Revealed"	July 3, 2026
The Painter reveals his true identity. Alex tracks down the missing Mikoy and Chiara as Sianong and Dara quietly monitor her every move.
51	"The Dealmaker"	July 6, 2026
Mikoy and Chiara face off with Alex as the Painter vanishes. Dara and Sianong talk through his situation, and the Valtrovis receive a surprise visitor.
52	"Awaiting Orders"	July 7, 2026
Alex, Mikoy and Chiara await word about their mission's new focus. Donabel opens her home to a surprising guest, and Mario gets unexpected news.
53	"Future Imperfect"	July 8, 2026
The Valtrovis talk things over with La Morte Bianca as Mikoy and Chiara head home to await their fate. Meanwhile, Sofie edges closer to the Pinagpalas.
54	"New Allies"	July 9, 2026
Back in Manila, Mikoy and Chiara meet the team behind the operation. Viktor faces a dilemma as Director Ruiz mobilizes agents against La Morte Bianca.
55	"Settling In"	July 10, 2026
Director Ruiz assigns a new agent to Mikoy and Chiara. In Cebu, Angelito shows Sofie his hometown. Donabel's guest may be overstaying her welcome.
56	"Ground Rules"	July 13, 2026
Mikoy, Chiara and Agent Alex navigate their new living arrangement. Angelito and Sofie welcome friends to Cebu, and La Morte Bianca stuns Donabel.
57	"Silver Linings"	July 14, 2026
Agent Alex and Chiara have a heart-to-heart, as do Angelito and Lawrence. Meanwhile, Mikoy finds his own way to help Chiara see the bright side.
58	"The Alert"	July 15, 2026
Angelito and Sofie's bond deepens. An alert reveals the Moraviano syndicate is mobilizing, and the team regroups at the safe house to plan next steps.
59	"Unspoken Worries"	July 16, 2026
Mikoy overhears Agent Alex's doubts and reassures her and Sianong. Isabella's views on motherhood shake Donabel's trust as the Valtrovis shift roles.
60	"Too Uncomfortable"	July 17, 2026
Mario acts fast to protect his family; Viktor struggles to do the same. An impatient Chiara takes matters into her own hands as Cocoy bonds with Mikoy.
61	"Homecoming"	July 20, 2026
Ruiz reprimands his agents as they struggle to piece together the previous night. In Cebu, Mikoy enjoys a sweet family reunion until disaster strikes.
62	"Family First"	July 21, 2026
Chiara makes a bold choice for the rest of the Valtrovis while Mikoy and Alex stay up awaiting her return. Sianong asks Alex about her birthday wish.
63	"Keeping Watch"	July 22, 2026
Viktor reassures a worried Donabel of Chiara's safety. Alex and Sianong lay down the rules at the safe house as La Morte Bianca continues her hunt.
64	"What's at Stake"	July 23, 2026
Mario takes decisive action to solve his problems. Chiara returns and meets with Ruiz, developing a plan to counter La Morte Bianca's next move.
65	"Pressure Mounts"	July 24, 2026
Ruiz calls the president for help. The agents learn Mario has fled the safe house. Chiara and Mikoy grapple with how to move forward together.
66	"Changing Course"	July 27, 2026
Pressured by the Concordat, La Morte Bianca intensifies her hunt. General Ruiz proposes a turning point. Chiara seeks an ally and opens up to Alex.
67	"Cracks"	July 28, 2026
La Morte Bianca's facade cracks. Alex chafes at Chiara's new team while Mikoy stands by her. General Ruiz orders Dara to launch his own investigation.
68	"Found"	July 29, 2026
Donabel's wish for a simpler life leaves Viktor torn. General Ruiz digs deeper as Chiara shares her plans. Mikoy learns his father's whereabouts.
69	"Unlikely Allies"	July 30, 2026
At the safe house, Chiara and Alex put aside their differences — just in time for a surprise party. Brusko helps Viktor work through his Donabel dilemma.
70	"Warning Signs"	July 31, 2026
Alex opens up about her past to warn Mikoy. Chiara sees a new side of Alex, and they share a quiet moment. La Morte Bianca tries to unmask an informant.
71	"Changing Sides"	August 3, 2026
Mario's intel gives General Ruiz a glimpse into Senator Quintin's life. Meanwhile, Brusko shifts loyalties as Sofie races to warn her friends.
72	"Head Start"	August 4, 2026
Sianong, Mikoy and Chiara race to catch up to La Morte Bianca. Sofie and Angelito struggle to escape the chaos that's quickly engulfing the island.
73	"Radio Silence"	August 5, 2026
After losing contact with the field team, General Ruiz urgently summons Alex to Manila while Chiara, Mikoy, and Sianong hide from La Morte Bianca.
74	"Holding On"	August 6, 2026
La Morte Bianca has good news for the Concordat. Chiara and Mikoy try reaching the agency. Mario heads to the safe house. Sianong's condition worsens.
75	"Full Force"	August 7, 2026
As the agency prepares to attack the island, Sofie and Angelito escape La Morte Bianca's henchmen. Alex finally reunites with her missing allies.
76	"Power Play"	August 10, 2026
The team fights off La Morte Bianca's henchmen. Ruiz finds Sofie and Angelito as he and Sianong are rescued just in time. Nanay Tess reaches Mikoy.
77	"The Message"	August 11, 2026
La Morte Bianca messages Chiara, and the team launches a plan. General Ruiz gives Alex career advice while Sianong begins to recover from his injuries.
78	"Face-Off"	August 12, 2026
As Sianong acts on his own, the Valtrovis square off with La Morte Bianca while the agents storm her hideout. Chiara recruits an old adversary.
79	"Moving On"	August 13, 2026
Chiara and Mikoy start a new life while Viktor and Donabel negotiate their freedom. As the agency debates on how to move forward, Senator Quintin visits.
80	"The Way Forward"	August 14, 2026
Mikoy makes the best of their new life while Chiara struggles. Both turn to their mothers for advice, and by day's end, one thing is clear for Mikoy.
81	"Sharing the News"	August 17, 2026
Senator Quintin offers Alex a way to reunite the team. Chiara opens up to the Pinagpalas amid celebrations as Mario and Mikoy share a father-son talk.
82	"Wedding Plans"	August 18, 2026
While Mikoy and Chiara start planning their wedding, Alex meets with General Ruiz to discuss their intel on Senator Quintin's motives.
83	"The Guest List"	August 19, 2026
Alex deals with her fellow agents' plans as Mikoy calls in a favor. Sianong learns of Ruiz's suspicions about the senator. Chiara gets sentimental.
84	"Under the Surface"	August 20, 2026
General Ruiz confronts Senator Quintin about his recent behavior at the agency. Ramboy pitches Mikoy an elaborate wedding plan. Chiara calls The Painter.
85	"Some Wonderful News"	August 21, 2026
As Angelito's memory slowly returns, General Ruiz and Senator Quintin face a split. Mikoy and Chiara meet a surprise guest with wonderful news.
86	"Preparations"	August 24, 2026
Sensing something is off, Carlota digs deeper into Senator Quintin's shady background. Chiara struggles with her intense wedding preparations.
87	"Friendly Competition"	August 25, 2026
Alex's rivalry with the wedding planner heats up as Mikoy and his entourage visit the tailor. Carlota and Cocoy quietly dig deeper into Senator Quintin.
88	"Facing the Truth"	August 26, 2026
Mario investigates a strange barangay incident at the police station. Carlota and Cocoy carry out their plan as Sofie and Luisa Mae finally face off.
89	"Under Pressure"	August 27, 2026
Viktor gives Carlota and Cocoy the intel they need, and they push forward as a team. Mikoy and Chiara tackle their latest challenge: the wedding dance.
90	"The Next Move"	August 28, 2026
The gang reviews the barangay video and Chiara's suspicions lead her to call The Painter. Viktor gets an offer he might not be able to turn down.
91	"Confidences"	August 31, 2026
Sianong relays Carlota and Cocoy's intel to General Ruiz. Chiara's confession unfortunately confirms Mikoy's suspicions about her state of mind.
92	"Unexpected Arrival"	September 1, 2026
Mario reconnects with his old friend, General Ruiz. Mikoy thanks Alex for her loyalty, and Chiara's parents finally see her in her wedding dress.
93	"Questions"	September 2, 2026
An emotional Mikoy and Chiara join their wedding parties for pre-wedding traditions. Viktor is transferred to a new facility by mysterious orders.
94	"A Familiar Face"	September 3, 2026
Carlota and Cocoy discuss Senator Quintin's motives toward the Valtrovis. Vicky arrives with a message for Chiara as pre-wedding festivities kick off.
95	"The Past Catches Up"	September 4, 2026
The morning after the bridal shower brings an amusing revelation for Angelito and Sofie. Chiara realizes that marriage will not erase her past.
96	"Connections"	September 7, 2026
Alex reevaluates the past few weeks, trying to uncover the mysterious vigilante's identity. Vicky reminds Chiara of an old mission she took on years ago.
97	"A Gathering Storm"	September 8, 2026
While General Ruiz reconnects with Mario, the agents — and Donabel — learn Viktor's whereabouts. Mikoy grows increasingly suspicious.
98	"Unmasked"	September 9, 2026
Carlota reunites Donabel with Viktor, and Sianong reveals the vigilante's identity, but at what cost? Mikoy and Chiara are finally ready to tie the knot.
99	"Promises"	September 10, 2026
Mikoy and Chiara send each other gifts and words of love. General Ruiz's big heart surprises his agents, and Senator Quintin discovers the investigation.
100	"Waiting"	September 11, 2026
The Valtrovi family comes back together just in time for the wedding. Mikoy waits anxiously for Chiara at the altar, but will she arrive as planned?
101	"The Hidden Truth"	September 14, 2026
The agents and the Valtrovis assess diverging theories about Chiara's true whereabouts. Mario comforts Mikoy, who explores a new lead from Alex.
102	"Blindsided"	September 15, 2026
Mikoy, Alex and Sianong start their new operation, while Mario faces a betrayal. Armed with Vicky's intel, Chiara hunts an alleged assassin.
103	"The Fallout"	September 16, 2026
The agents face General Ruiz when he learns of the Valtrovis' status. Chiara, Viktor and Donabel begin to understand Vicky's role in the conspiracy.
104	"The New Players"	September 17, 2026
Mikoy meets a new team of agents, and Chiara calls in a favor in Prague. Vicky returns to Manila, where Sianong tips her off to everyone's movements.
105	"New Order"	September 18, 2026
General Ruiz coordinates with Mikoy and the new agency to uncover La Fornarina's plans. Sianong and Ramboy confront the hard truth about Vicky.
106	"A Desperate Move"	September 21, 2026
After the agency finds Chiara, Mikoy and General Ruiz clash over their next steps. Vicky reassures Ramboy of his place in her unfolding plans.
107	"The Revelation"	September 22, 2026
Sianong provides Alex and Mikoy with some important intel. Viktor and Donabel share their concerns about Vicky with Chiara, who remains steadfast.
108	"Italian Ties"	September 23, 2026
The agents consider using Italian contacts to find Chiara, but Alex and General Ruiz fear the worst when Mikoy volunteers to lead the mission.
109	"The Cost"	September 24, 2026
Mikoy reviews his mission plan with the agents, and Alex confronts him over his crisis of conscience. Chiara frets about her future — and her family's.
110	"In Pursuit"	September 25, 2026
Mikoy meets a secretive source, receiving an uplifting message at a desperate moment. General Ruiz okays the mission, and Alex sets her sights on Italy.
111	"No Turning Back"	September 28, 2026
Vicky and Chiara prepare to meet the Castellanos. Mikoy, on a stakeout with Alex, reassures her when she doubts his commitment to their plan.
112	"Face to Face"	September 29, 2026
While General Ruiz and the agents prep for their mission with the BIBO, Mikoy defends his informant’s intel. Chiara learns that the GAGO is in Rome.
113	"Face to Face"	September 30, 2026
Chiara agrees to handle the GAGO agents in Italy herself. Mikoy finally introduces his informant to Alex, who reluctantly decides that she can trust him.
114	"Taking Sides"	October 1, 2026
Mikoy returns home, and Tess tries to keep him from succumbing to his anger. Chiara resists Vicky’s manipulation. The BIBO agents mobilize.
115	"The Last Stand"	October 2, 2026
Alex races to stop Mikoy and Chiara, who face off on opposite sides of the growing conflict with nothing left to lose — until the BIBO intervenes.

== Production ==
=== Development and casting ===
In November 2025, the series was announced during the TV5’s Thanksgiving Trade Event and has cast Andrea Brillantes and Enrique Gil in their lead roles and their first team up. Joining the cast of the series are Kim Domingo and Cedrick Juan.

=== Filming ===
Principal photography commenced in Prague in February 2026.

== Release ==
The series was released first on Netflix on April 24, 2026, three days before its television premiere on TV5 on April 27. The series consists of 115 episodes. It was also aired on All TV 2 (through its ABS-CBN licensing), Kapamilya Channel, and A2Z on July 27.
