= Rob Gomez =

Filipino actor (born 1998)

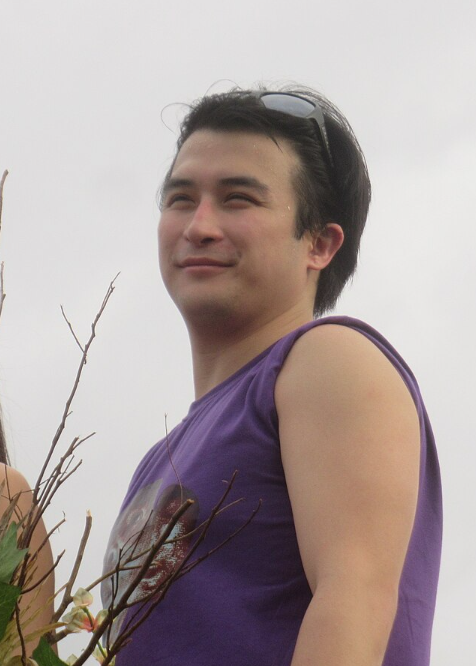
- Gomez in December 2024
- Born: Robert Michael Jason Jorge Gomez; March 23, 1998 (age 28); San Antonio, Quezon, Philippines
- Occupations: Actor, model
- Years active: 2010–present
- Height: 1.75 m (5 ft 9 in)
- Relatives: Ejercito family
- Family: Kate Gomez (mother); Gary Estrada (uncle)
- Website: Rob Gomez on Instagram

Robert Michael Jason Jorge Ejercito (born March 23, 1998), known professionally as Rob Gomez, is a Filipino actor and model. He is currently signed on GMA Network.

== Early and personal life ==
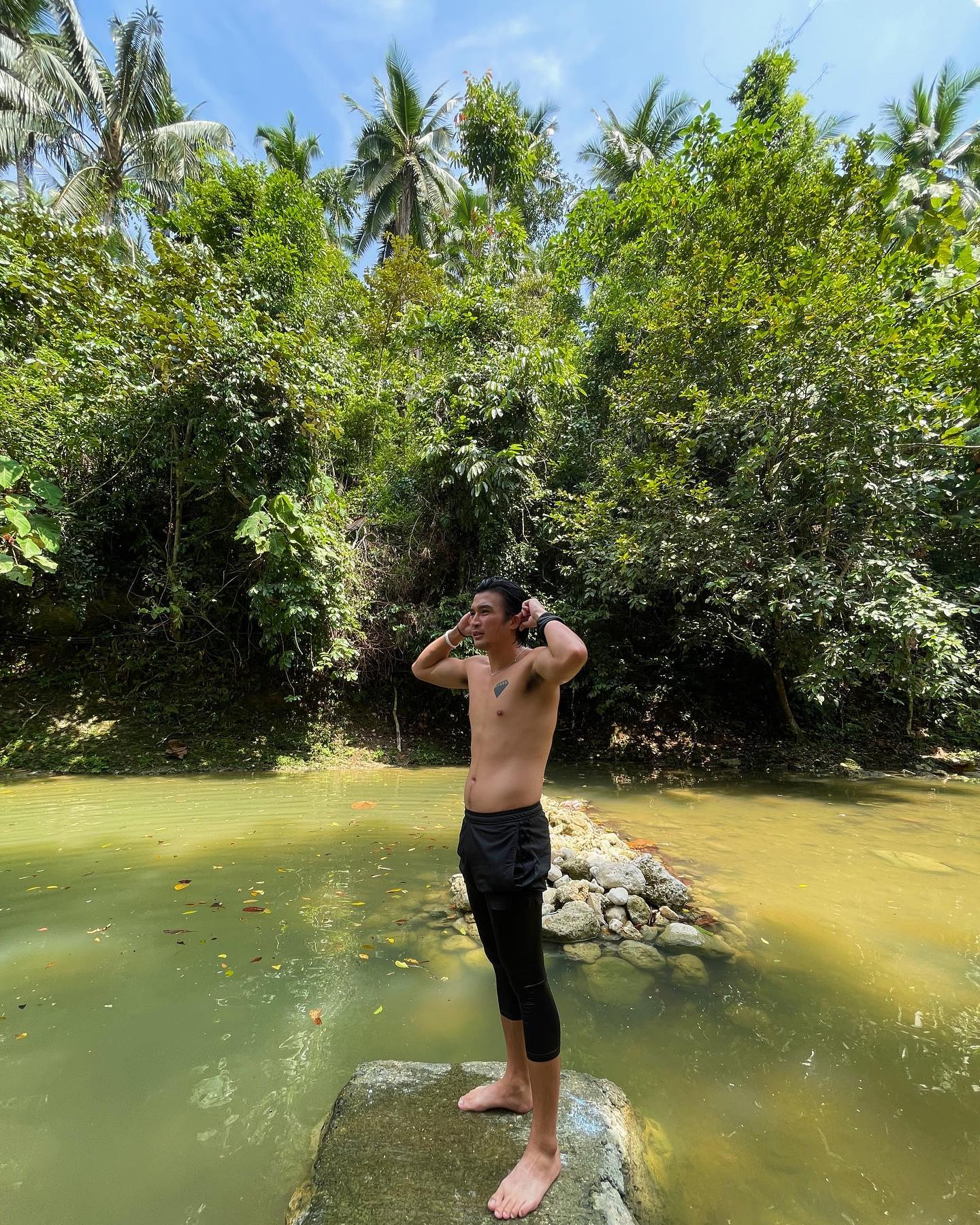
Gomez in 2022

Gomez is a member of the Ejército family. He spent his childhood in San Antonio, Quezon and lives in Parañaque. Born to Kate Gomez, he is Gary Estrada's nephew, Eric Ejército and Kiko Estrada's cousin, and George Estregan's grandson. His granduncle through Estregan is Joseph Ejército Estrada, the 13th President of the Philippines and former Mayor of Manila. He studied export management at De La Salle–College of Saint Benilde, and works as a co-host, dancer and singer.

In December 2023, Gomez and his former girlfriend Shaila Rebortera, had their daughter Amelia baptised. At Shibuya Scramble Square, Rebortera accepted the marriage proposal of her non-showbiz partner Luigi Agtoto, CEO of Cebu City Gold Crafts.

== Career ==
In 2013, Gomez was first seen on television via GMA Network's Walang Tulugan with The Master Showman as one of the contestants under German Moreno. In 2022, Gomez also joined the television drama anthology series Mano Po Legacy: The Family Fortune and Her Big Boss as Joseph Chan. In 2023, Gomez starred as Jared Illusorio in comedy-revenge drama series Magandang Dilag with actress-comedienne Herlene Budol playing the title role.

== Filmography ==
=== Television ===
Year	Title	Role
2010	Pidol's Wonderland	
2013	Walang Tulugan with the Master Showman	Himself / Co-Host
2014	Maynila: Spirit of the Heart	Jeromie
2014	Maynila: DIY: Happy Ending	Ricky
2015	Maynila: Sweet Summer Love	Jed
2015	Maynila: Love Vs. Dreams	Jordan
2015	Maynila: Can You Read My Heart	Wally
2016	Maynila: Set-Up For Love	Owen
2016	Maynila: Hope for a New Life	Sebastian
2017	Maynila: Love is Not Blind	Edgar Almario
2017	Maynila: Love Square	David Lozano
2018	Maynila: Utang sa Puso	Matteo
2018	Maynila: My Standby Lover	Kudos
2018	Maynila: The Set Up	Risky
2019	Maynila: Same Time, Same Place	Alden
2019	Maynila: Anak ng Tadhana	Raphael
2021	Regal Studios Presents: Bros B4 Rose	Lester
2022	Regal Studio Presents: Messy Thing Called Love	Jadson
2022	Regal Studio Presents: Isn't She Lovely?	Andrew
2022	Mano Po Legacy: The Family Fortune	Joseph Garces- Chan
2022	Mano Po Legacy: Her Big Boss	Joseph Garces- Chan
2022	Regal Studio Presents: Wash, Dry, Fold	Alex
2022	Daddy's Gurl	Jigs Suarez
2022	Regal Studio Presents: Budol Queen	James
2022	Daig Kayo ng Lola Ko: Lelang and Me	Declan
2022	Jose & Maria's Bonggang Villa	Marco
2023	Regal Studios Presents: Fight for Your Love	Ryan
2023	Regal Studios Presents: Love Me in 7 Days	Roque
2023	Magandang Dilag	Jared Illusorio
2023	Regal Studios Presents: My Strict Kuya	Xavier
2023	Regal Studios Presents: Meron Bang Tayo?	Dion
2023–2024	Lovers & Liars	Joseph Mentiroso
2024	Tadhana: Komisyon	Earl
2024	Magpakailanman: Babalikan o Papalitan	Diego
2024	Regal Studio Presents: Newly Weds	Aldrin
2024	Tadhana: Meant for You	Jules
2024	Regal Studio Presents: Listen and Love	Carlo
2024	Regal Studio Presents: Angel on My Shoulder	Maki
2025	Regal Studio Presents: Betty and the Vet	Iñaki
