= Angel Guardian =

Filipino actress (born 1998)

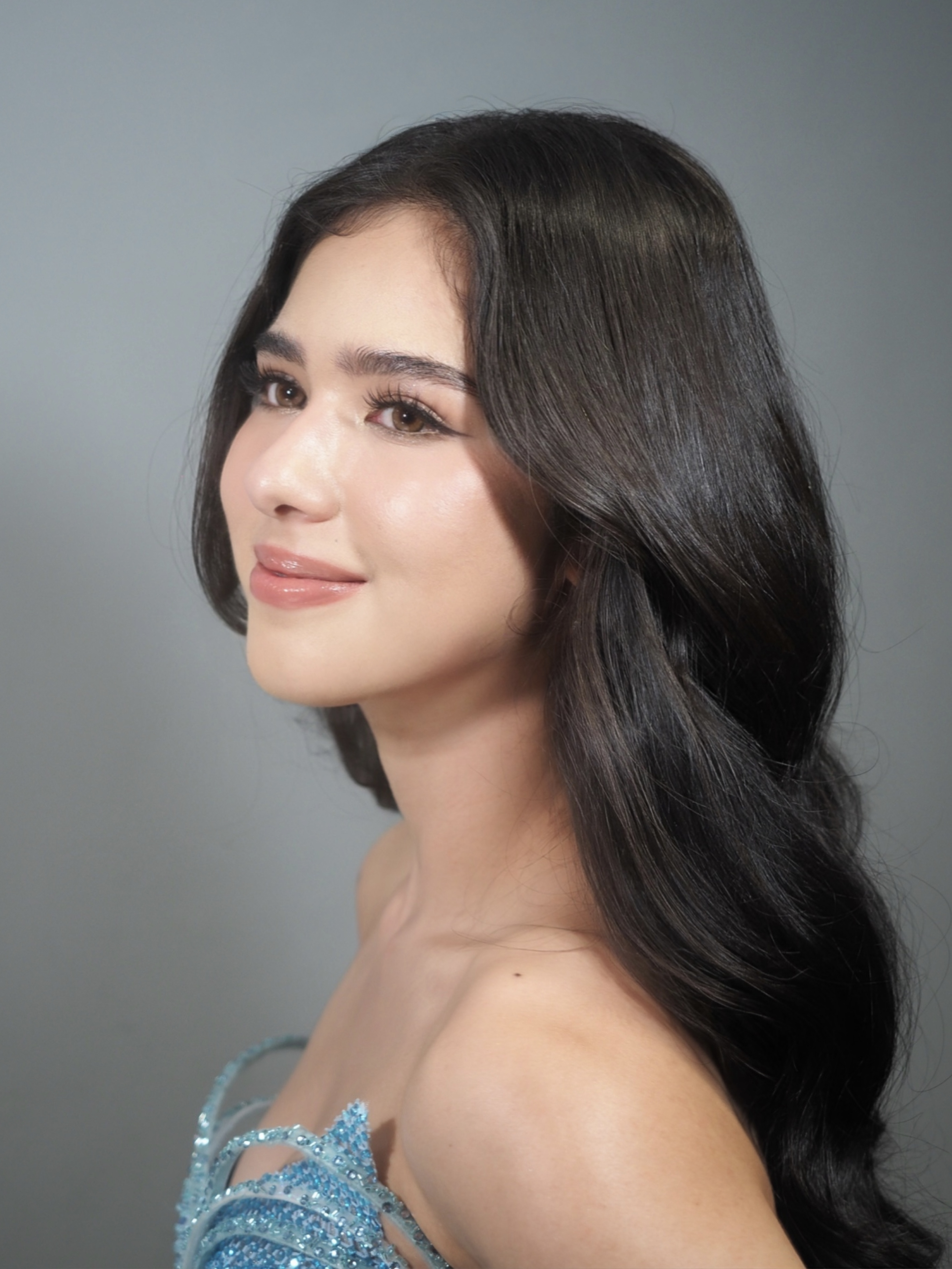
- Guardian in March 2026
- Born: Angel Grace Trazona Guardian; September 6, 1998 (age 28); Manila, Philippines
- Occupation: Actress
- Years active: 2011–present
- Agent: Sparkle GMA Artist Center (2018–present)
- Known for: Running Man Philippines
- Height: 5 ft 4 in (163 cm)
- Musical career
- Genres: OPM
- Instruments: Vocals; guitar
- Label: GMA Music (2019–present)
- Website: Angel Guardian on Facebook

Angel Grace Trazona Guardian (born September 6, 1998) is a Filipino actress of Palestinian descent. She is best known for her participation in the reality show Running Man Philippines (2022–2024), where she became the first Ultimate Runner. She stars as Deia, one of the main characters in Encantadia Chronicles: Sang'gre.

== Early life ==
Angel Guardian was born on September 6, 1998, Manila, Philippines. A previous version of Sparkle's artist profile for Guardian described her as "Fil-Israeli". However, some interviews described her as half-Palestinian or Filipino-Palestinian. Guardian's official artist profile states that she is Filipino-Palestinian.

== Career ==
In 2024, Guardian was included in GMA's Sparkle 10, a group of rising young actresses from the network. After small roles in shows such as Mano Po Legacy: The Flower Sisters, Guardian landed a major role as one of the Sang'gres in the Encantadia spin-off, Encantadia Chronicles: Sang'gre (2025). Her character, Deia, is named after Iza Calzado's daughter, with Calzado's permission. Calzado, who portrayed Amihan in the original series, wished Guardian good luck on social media, writing "Avisala, Sang’gre Deia!, Alagaan mo ang brilyante natin (Hello, Sang'gre Deia!, Take care of our precious crystal)." She described Guardian as "kind", "sincere", and "level headed".

== Personal life ==
Guardian supports Palestinian liberation. She has shared an image describing Israel as an "occupation" and an "apartheid state", but clarified that she does not support Hamas.

== Filmography ==
=== Film ===
Year	Title	Role	Ref.
2019	Black Lipstick	Aya	
2020	D'Ninang	Sol	
2023	Shake, Rattle & Roll Extreme	Margot	
2025	The Heart of Music	Debbie	
2025	Rekonek	Cheska	

=== Television ===
Year	Title	Role	Note(s)	Ref.
2018–present	iBilib	Herself (co-host)	Recurring cast	
2018	Maynila: The Sweetest Revenge	Sandy	Episode guest	
2018	Pamilya Roces	Zara	Guest role	
2018–2019	Onanay	Chelsea	Supporting role	
2019	Studio 7	Herself	Guest performer	
2019	One Hugot Away: Beauty and the Hypebeast	Cat	Episode guest	
2019	Sahaya	Young Irene	Guest role	
2019	Stories for the Soul: Bespren	Camille	Episode role	
2019	Maynila: Hugot Camp	Anicka	Episode role	
2019	Magpakailanman: OFW Most Wanted	Princess Shatara	Episode role	
2020	Maynila: A Fake Love Story	Che-Che	Episode role	
2021	Regal Studio Presents: Promises to Keep	Alma	Episode role	
2021	Dear Uge: Jing, Ang Bato	Marcia	Episode role	
2021	Heartful Café	Charity	Supporting role	
2021	Pepito Manaloto: Ang Unang Kwento	Beth Lopez	Supporting role	
2022	All-Out Sundays	Herself (guest)	2022–2023; Performer / various roles (since roles 2023)	
2022	Running Man Philippines	Herself (Cast)	Season 1 winner	
2022–2023	Mano Po Legacy: The Flower Sisters	Iris Ong Chua	Main role	
2022–2026	Family Feud	Herself (contestant)		
2023	Bubble Gang	Herself (guest)	Various roles	
2023	Magpakailanman: The Hostage Girl	Judy	Episode role	
2023	Tanikala: Kampihan	Angelica	Lenten special	
2023	Daig Kayo ng Lola Ko: Lodi League	Ika	Main role	
2023	Amazing Earth	Herself (guest)		
2023	Regal Studio Presents: Ate Knows Best	Blessy	Episode role	
2024	It's Showtime	Herself (guest)		
2024	OK Ako	Herself		
2024	Running Man Philippines	Herself (Cast)	Season 2	
2025–2026	Encantadia Chronicles: Sang'gre	Sang'gre Deia	Main role	
2026	Pinoy Big Brother: Celebrity Collab Edition 2.0	Herself	Houseguest	
2026	A Million Dreams	TBA	Main role	

== Discography ==
=== Singles ===
Title	Year	Details	Ref.
"Di Ko"	2019	Released: September 11, 2019; Label: GMA Music; Formats: Digital Download	
"No Sound"	2020	Released: January 23, 2020; Label: GMA Music; Formats: Digital Download	

== Awards and nominations ==
Year	Award-Giving Body / Organization	Awards	Nominated Work	Result	Ref.
2023	37th PMPC Star Awards for Movies	New Movie Actress of the Year	D'Ninang	Nominated	
2023	BEST Awards	Teen Actress of the Year	—	Won	
2025	8th Philippine Empowered Men & Women of the Year	Awardee	—	Won	
2025	Asia Diamond Elite Awards	Iconic Breakthrough Actress in a Fantasy Role	Encantadia Chronicles: Sang'gre	Won	
2025	KAKAMMPI ("Pagkilala sa mga Modernong Bayani ng Komunidad")	Female Action Hero of the New Generation	Encantadia Chronicles: Sang'gre	Won	
2026	11th Platinum Stallion National Media Awards	Best Primetime Drama Series Actress	Encantadia Chronicles: Sang'gre	Won	
2026	World Class Excellence Japan Awards (15th)	Best Actress in a TV Series	Encantadia Chronicles: Sang'gre	Won	
