= Regal Studio Presents =

Philippine television drama series

- Title card
- Genre: Drama
- Country of origin: Philippines
- Original language: Tagalog

Production
- Camera setup: Multiple-camera setup
- Running time: 45 minutes
- Production companies: GMA Entertainment Group; Regal Entertainment Inc.

Original release
- Network: GMA Network
- Release: September 11, 2021 – present

Regal Studio Presents is a Philippine television drama anthology series broadcast by GMA Network. It premiered on September 11, 2021 on the network's Sabado Star Power sa Gabi line up.

== Cast and characters ==
Cast

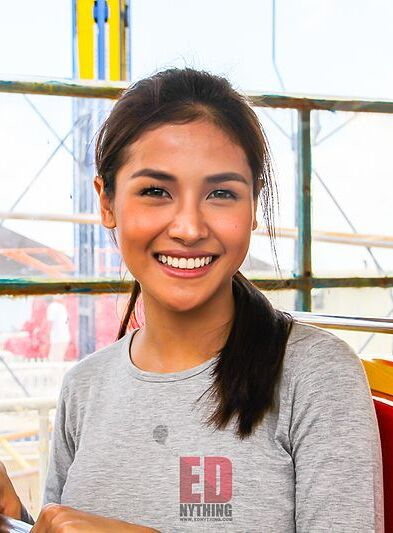
Sanya Lopez

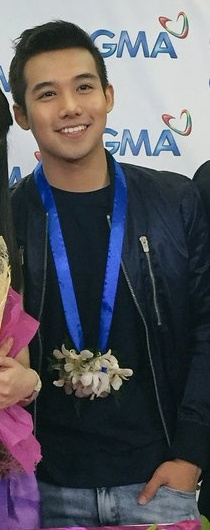
Ken Chan

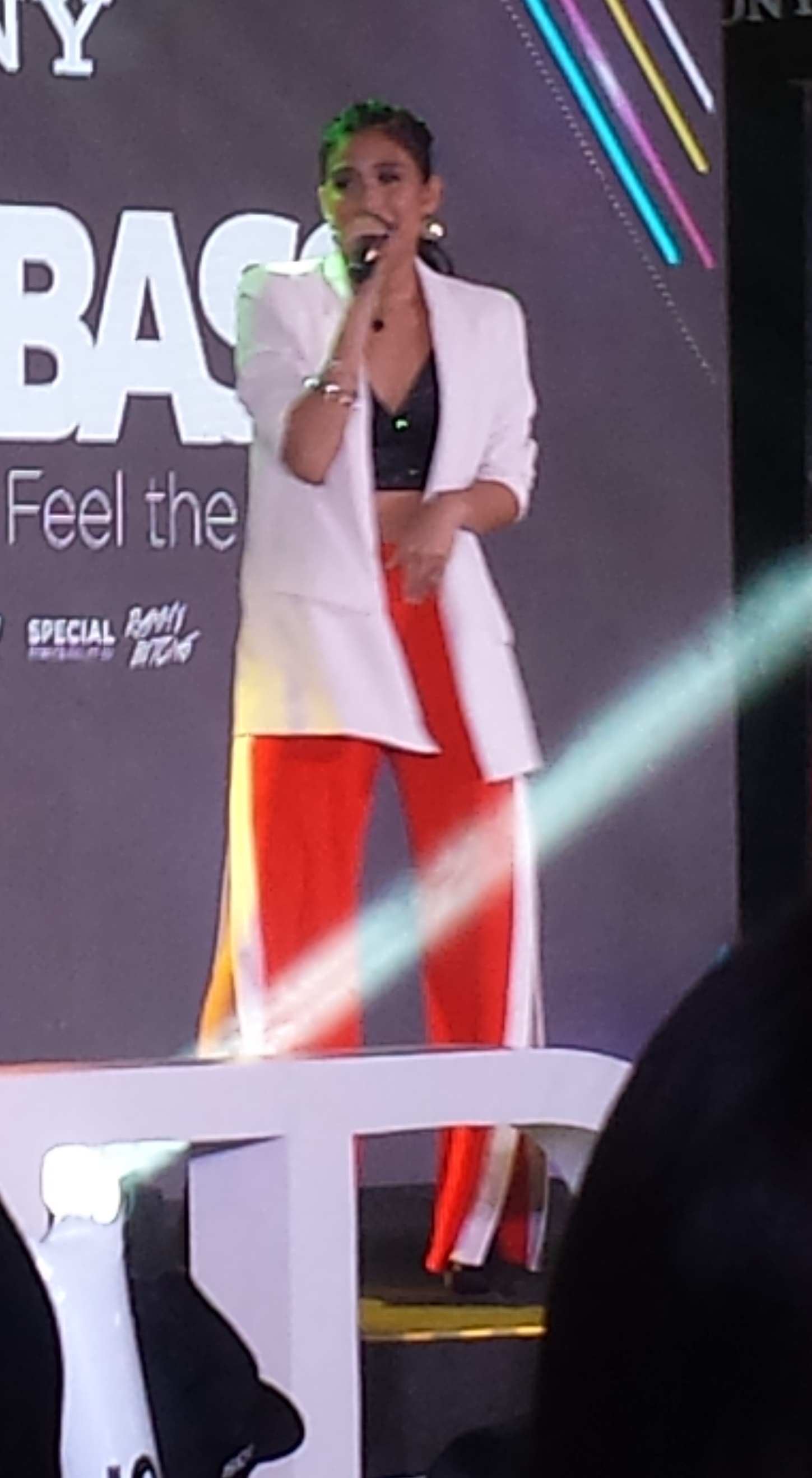
Gabbi Garcia

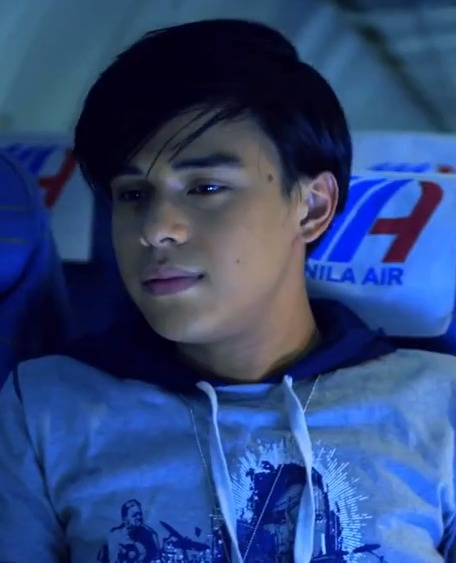
Khalil Ramos

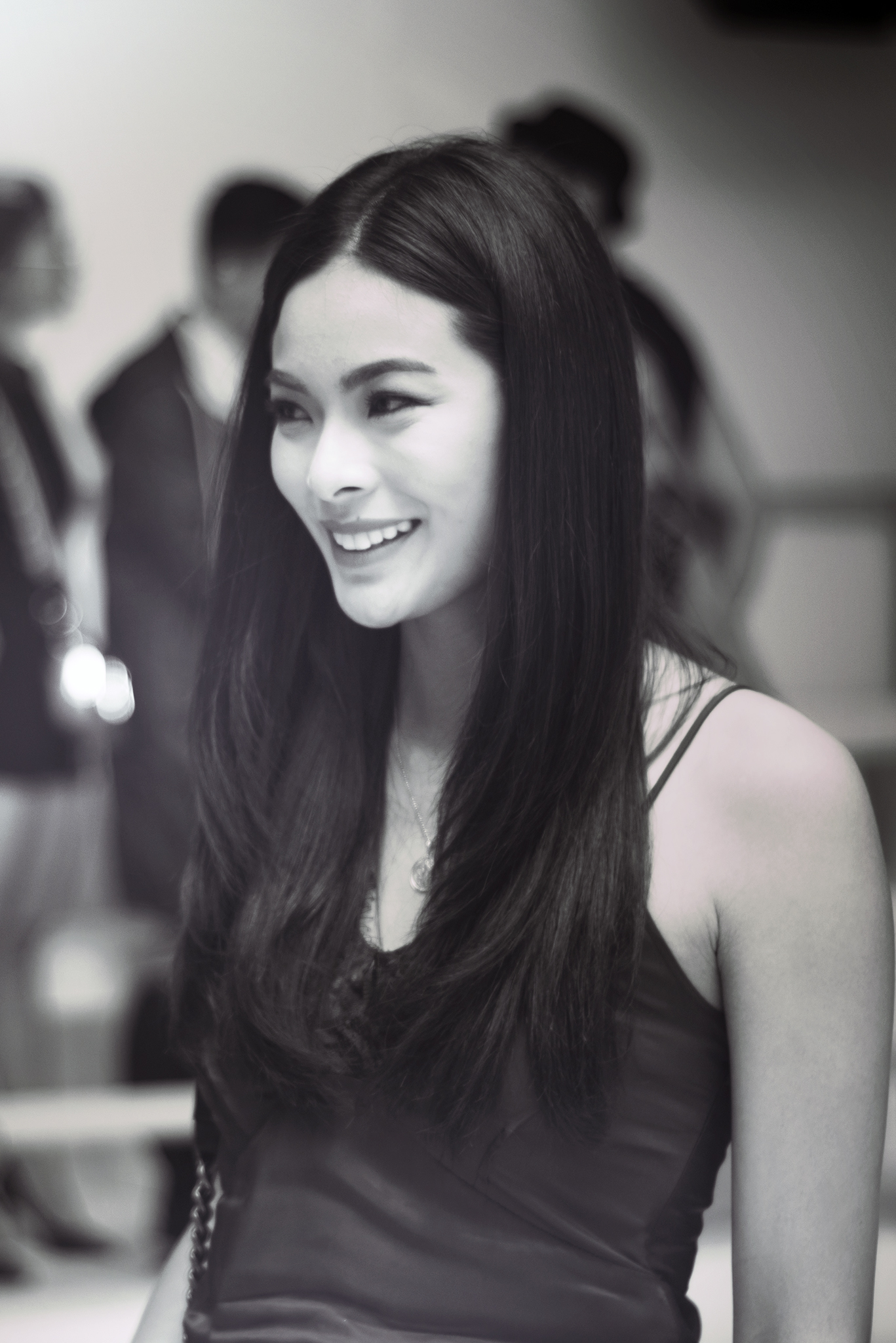
Maxine Medina

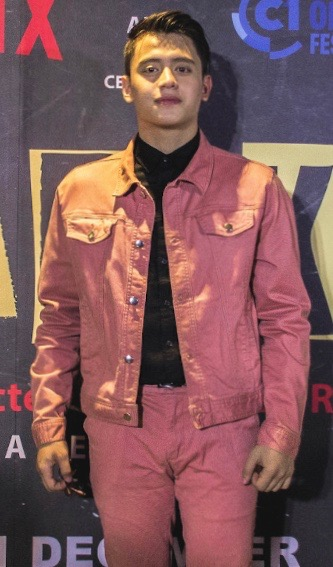
Kelvin Miranda

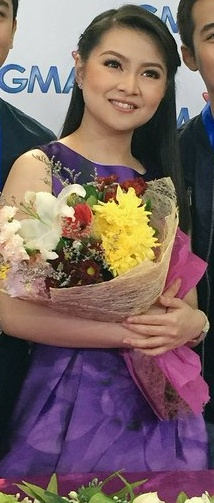
Barbie Forteza

That Thin Line Between

- Sanya Lopez as Gemma Rose
- Ken Chan as Julius
- Shanelle Agustin as Aiah
- Sandro Muhlach as Ansel

Raya Sirena

- Sofia Pablo as Raya
- Allen Ansay as Gavin

One Million Comments, Magjo-jowa na Ako!

- Gabbi Garcia as Ana Marie
- Khalil Ramos as Prince Matt

Ikaw si Ako, Ako si Ikaw

- Shaira Diaz as Janice
- Kokoy de Santos as Marco
- Analyn Barroas Wendy
- Darwin Yu as CJ

The Signs

- Bianca Umali as Moira
- Prince Carlos as Paul
- Gab Moreno as Patrick
- Carlo San Juan as Niel

Promises to Keep

- Mikee Quintos as Jenny
- Kelvin Miranda as Eloy
- Tyrone Tan as Paolo
- Angel Guardianas Alma

My Birthday Wish

- Barbie Forteza as Joanna
- Royce Cabrera as James
- Julián Roxas as Henry
- Sarah Edwards as Cherrie

The Truth About Jane

- Joyce Ching as Marcia
- Ashley Ortega as Jane
- Kiray Celis as Paula
- Anna Vicenteas Iris

Karinderya Queens

- Maxine Medina as Dayanara
- Casie Banks as Sushmita
- Derrick Monasterio as Dante

Magkaibigan, Nagkaibigan

- Lexi Gonzales as Lanelle
- Kim De Leon as Jared
- Anjay Anson as Arjun

Anyare Sa'Yo

- Rita Daniela as Baby Girl
- Jak Roberto as Erwin

Bros B4 Rose

- Kim Domingo as Rosa
- Jeric Gonzalesas Vincent
- Rob Gomez as Lester

Isn't She Lovely?

- Jelai Andres as Lovely
- David Licauco as Stephen
- Nikki Co as Winston
- Rob Gomez as Andrew
- Dustin Yu as Matt

Listen and Love

- Lexi Gonzales as Monica
- Rob Gomez as Carlo
- Anjo Pertierra as Charles

Pares Queens Overload

- Mary Jean Lastimosa as Gloria
- Beatrice Gomez as Margie
- Joaquin Manansala as Rolly

== Ratings ==
According to AGB Nielsen Philippines' Nationwide Urban Television Audience Measurement People in television homes, the pilot episode of Regal Studio Presents earned a 10.4% rating.

== Accolades ==
Accolades received by Regal Studio Presents
Year	Award	Category	Recipient	Result	Ref.
2025	38th PMPC Star Awards for Television	Best Drama Anthology	Regal Studio Presents	Nominated	
2025	37th PMPC Star Awards for Television	Best Drama Anthology	Regal Studio Presents	Nominated	
