= Regal Entertainment =

Philippine filmmaking and entertainment firm

Regal Entertainment Inc.
- Logo used since 2018
- Trade name: Regal Entertainment
- Formerly: Regal Films (1962–1998)
- Type: Private
- Industry: Film; Television
- Founded: August 19, 1962; 64 years ago
- Founder: Lily Monteverde
- Headquarters: 38 Valencia St., New Manila, Quezon City, Metro Manila, Philippines
- Area served: Worldwide
- Key people: Roselle Monteverde-Teo (Executive producer and CEO); Keith Monteverde (EVP and film producer)
- Products: Motion pictures; Home videos; Television series
- Services: Film production; Television production; Film distribution; Film promotion; Television distribution
- Divisions: Regal Multimedia Inc.; Regal Home Video; APG Films; MAQ Productions Inc.; Mother Studio Films; Good Harvest Unlimited; Tagalog Pictures Inc.; Reality Entertainment; Starzan Films
- Subsidiaries: Regal International Inc.
- Website: www.regal-entertainment.com

Regal Entertainment, Inc. (formerly and more commonly known as Regal Films) is a Philippine film and television production and distribution company headquartered in New Manila, Quezon City. It was founded by Lily Monteverde on August 19, 1962. Regal Entertainment is one of the largest film studios in the Philippines, along with Star Cinema, GMA Pictures, and Viva Films.

== History ==
Regal Films started as a distributor of foreign films, such as That Man from Istanbul, Marsha and All Mine to Give. Lily Monteverde, who originally started a popcorn stand in C.M. Recto Avenue, Manila, was able to earn enough money from both ventures for a local movie production. In 1976, after three years of establishing its own production studio, Lily asked permission from her father to produce her first project, Kayod sa Umaga, Kayod sa Gabi and it became a big hit then in theatres. Alma Moreno was the first star who had an exclusive contract with Regal.

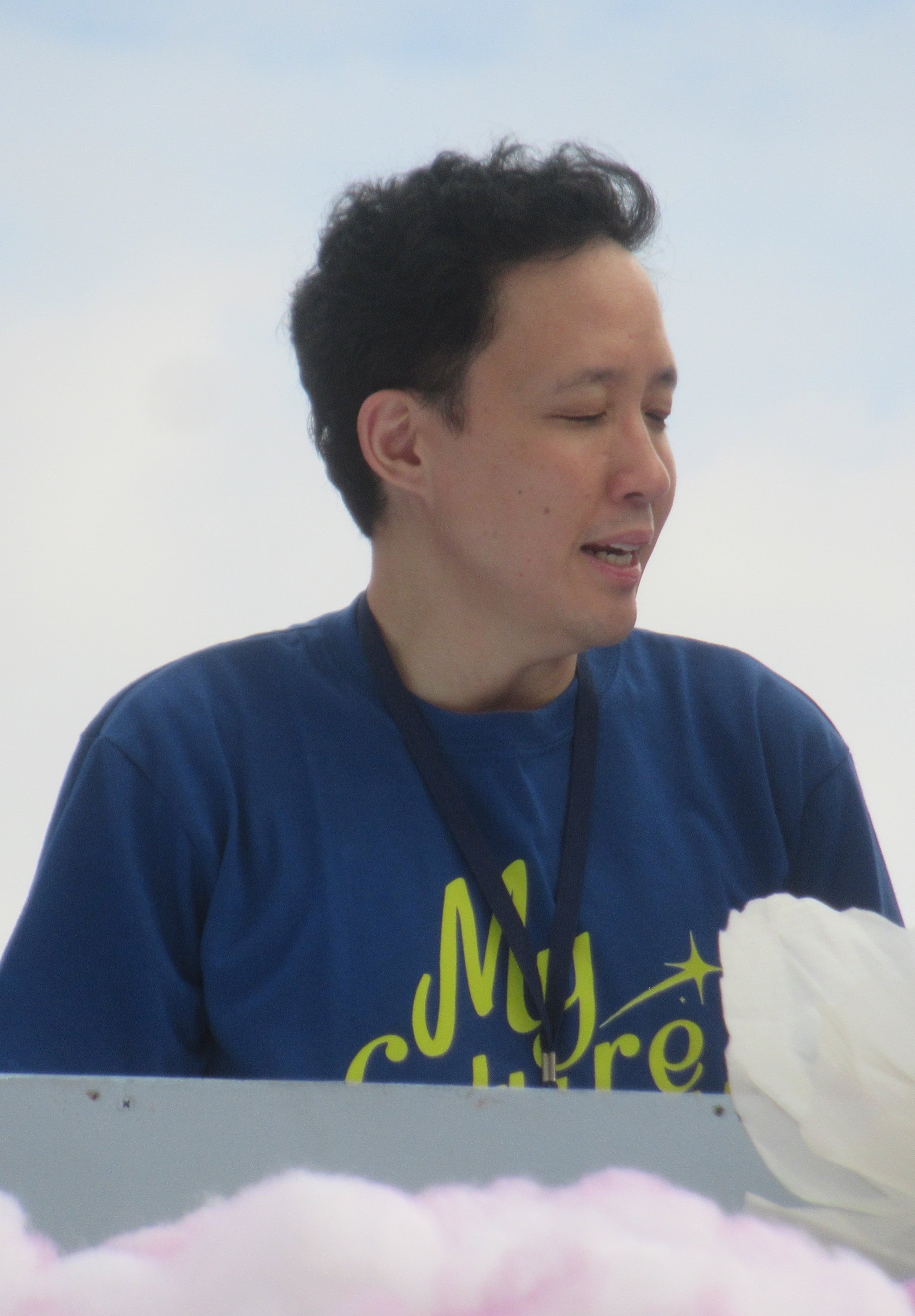
Keith Monteverde (My Future You, Lily Monteverde's last film)

In the early years, Regal Films mostly produced local movies with a "mature" and "daring" style, although it produced more "wholesome" pictures later on. In 1987, it ventured into local television; Regal Television produced several entertainment programs in the '80s, '90s and 2020's aired on five different channels, ABS-CBN 2, GMA 7, RPN 9, TV5 and IBC 13.

In 2024, Keith Monteverde (the elder child of the CEO Roselle Y. Monteverde-Teo) assumed the position of EVP of Regal Entertainment, following the passing of Lily Monteverde.

Some of the studio's notable films include:

- Scorpio Nights - a controversial 1985 erotic thriller film directed by Peque Gallaga.
- Shake, Rattle & Roll - The first instalment was produced and released in 1984 by Athena Productions while the subsequent films were later produced and released by Regal Films itself.
- Relasyon - one of the most remarkable films of the Vilma Santos-Christopher de Leon tandem.
- Tiyanak
- Yamashita: The Tiger's Treasure
- Mano Po - a franchise that involves the lives of the Chinese Filipino families. Carmina Villarroel, Kris Aquino, Angel Locsin and Maricel Soriano were among the actresses who starred in the films, and the sixth instalment was Sharon Cuneta's first major role in a Regal film.
- Live Show (aka Toro) - a film released in early 2001 which was met with controversy for its provocative scenes.
- Petrang Kabayo at ang Pilyang Kuting

== Television ==
In the late 1980s, Regal Television was a weekly Sunday programming block featuring the country's biggest artists from Regal Films (e.g. Gabby Concepcion, Snooky Serna, Manilyn Reynes, Sheryl Cruz, etc). In 1987, Regal co-produced Mother Studio Presents with GMA Network and featured monthly guest artists; and Regal Drama Presents with ABS-CBN and featured Maricel Soriano. In 1989, ABS-CBN took over the majority of her production on the latter program and renamed it The Maricel Drama Special. The movie studio had short-lived specials as well as mini-drama series celebrating the country's other elite artists or upcoming movie stars.

Regal Television has produced the 2011 reboot of Regal Shocker for TV5 and 10 years later, Gen Z (a co-production with Cignal Entertainment (formerly Studio5)). At present, they serve as an entertainment blocktimer for GMA Network, co-producing Regal Studio Presents (a weekly made-for-TV movie anthology), Mano Po Legacy (a non-Sine Novela based on the Mano Po franchise), and Lovers & Liars (a romantic drama primetime series). They also co-produced the Kapamilya Channel series Batang Quiapo with ABS-CBN Studios.

=== List of television shows ===
Year	Title	Network	Notes
1987	Mother Studio Presents	GMA Network	—N/a
1987	Regal Drama Presents	ABS-CBN	—N/a
1987–1988	Regal Showbiz Eye	IBC	—N/a
1987–1989	Maricel Regal Drama Special	ABS-CBN	—N/a
1989–1990	Regal Family	IBC	—N/a
2011–2012	Regal Shocker	TV5	—N/a
2021	Gen Z	TV5	co-production with Cignal Entertainment
2021–present	Regal Studio Presents	GMA Network	co-production with GMA Entertainment Group
2022	Mano Po Legacy: The Family Fortune	GMA Network	co-production with GMA Entertainment Group
2022	Mano Po Legacy: Her Big Boss	GMA Network	co-production with GMA Entertainment Group
2022	Raya Sirena	GMA Network	co-production with GMA Entertainment Group
2022–2023	Mano Po Legacy: The Flower Sisters	GMA Network	co-production with GMA Entertainment Group
2023–2026	Batang Quiapo	Kapamilya Channel	copyright holder only; produced by ABS-CBN Studios, Dreamscape Entertainment, FPJ Productions and CCM Film Productions
2023–2024	Lovers & Liars	GMA Network	co-production with GMA Entertainment Group
