= Penshoppe =

Clothing brand based in the Philippines

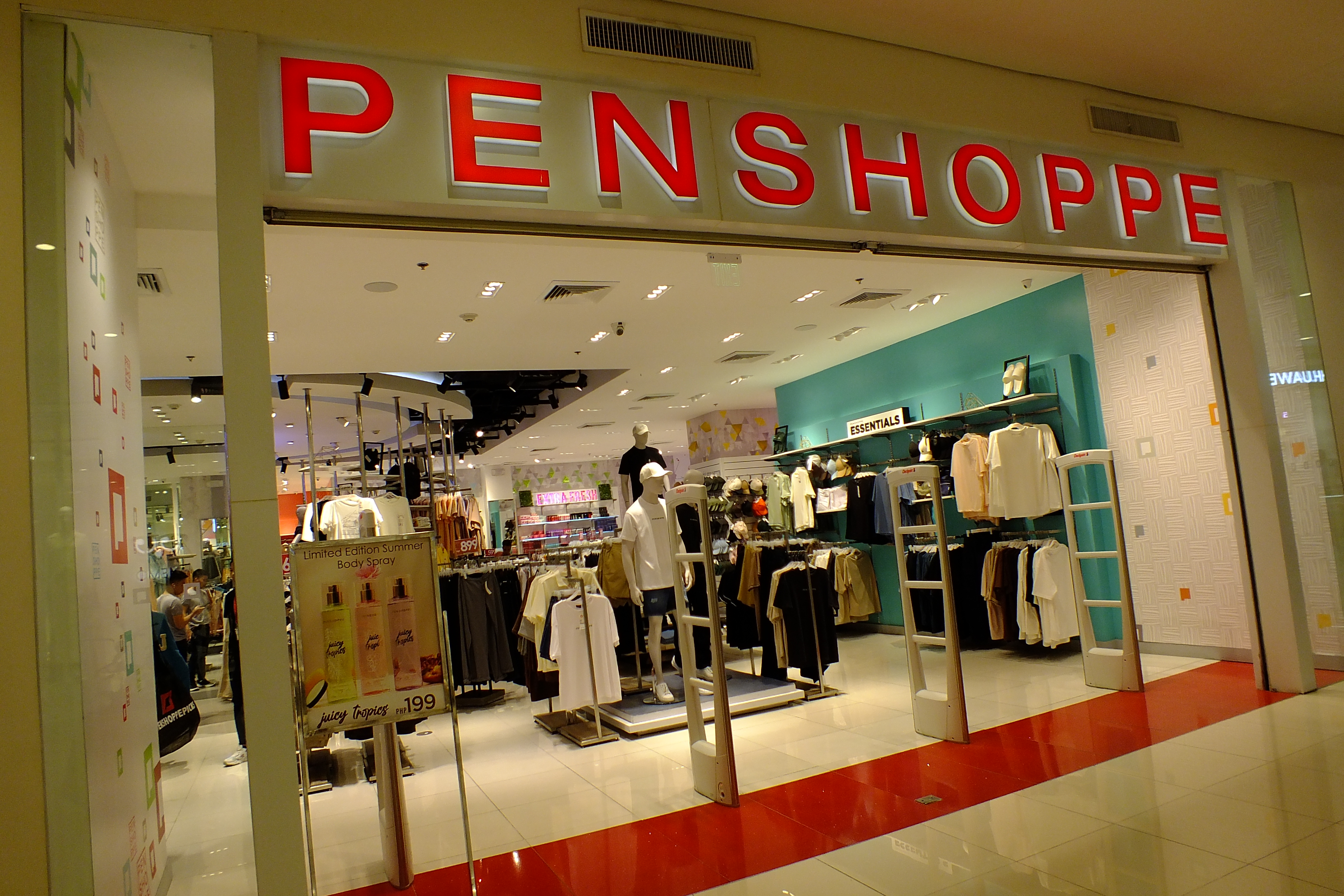
- An outlet at Ayala Malls Central Bloc, Cebu City
- Product type: Apparel
- Current owner: Golden ABC, Inc., aka Penshoppe Group (Chair and CEO, Bernie Liu, and President and COO, Alice Liu)
- Country: Philippines
- Introduced: 1986; 40 years ago
- Markets: Southeast Asia, United Arab Emirates
- Ambassador: Bini
- Website: penshoppe.com

Penshoppe is a casual wear retail brand based in the Philippines. Established in 1986, Penshoppe is the flagship brand of Golden ABC, Inc., a fashion house based in Quezon City, Philippines.

== Brand history ==
=== Philippines ===
Established in Cebu in 1986 by Penn Sio the founder of the brand,initially established itself in the Visayas and Mindanao markets. Penshoppe then expanded to Metro Manila, with its first boutique opening its doors in SM City North EDSA in 1991. Since then, Penshoppe's network of stores has grown to over 300 sites.

=== International expansion ===
In 2015, Penshoppe opened retail outlets in Bahrain, Cambodia, Indonesia, Saudi Arabia, and UAE.

== Marketing ==
=== Endorsements ===
Penshoppe previously had Ryan Agoncillo, Nikki Gil-Albert, Heart Evangelista, Jericho Rosales, Mikael Daez, Victor Basa, Bea Soriano, and Akihiro Sato as their local celebrity endorsers.

The brand's first international endorser was the Irish boy band Boyzone in 1995, followed by Mandy Moore in 2002.

In 2011, the brand signed Gossip Girl Ed Westwick as an international celebrity endorser. Thai actor Mario Maurer become an international endorser for this clothing brand.

In April 2012, the company announced that Zac Efron joined in as an endorser. In May 2012, American actor and model Ian Somerhalder, a.k.a. Damon Salvatore of The CW Television Network's The Vampire Diaries, announced as an endorser. In May 2012, Leighton Meester, also a Gossip Girl cast member, became an endorser for Penhshoppe's campaign called "All Stars".

On September 6, 2014, supermodel Cara Delevingne was named as Penshoppe's newest endorser.

In 2015, Sean O'Pry became a Penshoppe ambassador. On May 6, 2015, Penshoppe revealed that fashion model and television personality Kendall Jenner had joined the clothing line's endorsing team. On August 27, 2015, via Penshoppe announced that 2NE1's vocalist, Sandara Park, also joined as an ambassador.

In early 2016, Penshoppe signed male modeling's new "It Boy", Lucky Blue Smith. In May 2016, American fashion model Gigi Hadid became the new face for Penshoppe.

In 2017, Nam Joo-hyuk and the daughter of supermodel Cindy Crawford, Kaia Gerber, became the faces of Penshoppe.

In March 2018, Penshoppe announced Zayn Malik, a former member of One Direction, returned as an endorser alongside Bella Hadid, Jordan Barrett, and Cameron Dallas for their latest campaign.

In March 2019, Penshoppe selected an impressive cast to star in its high-fashion campaign, a massive lineup of global top models Francisco Lachowski, Jordan Barrett, Matthew Noszka, and Victoria's Secret Angels Josephine Skriver, and Lais Ribeiro to model its iconic swimwear styles for spring-summer 2019 collections. In November 2019, Lalisa Manoban, Thai member of girl group BLACKPINK, became Penshoppe's newest ambassador.

In 2021, Astro's Cha Eun-woo joined Penshoppe as an ambassador.

On May 26, 2022 Penshoppe announced NCT Dream, K-pop boy group under SM Entertainment, as an ambassador. Now EXO rapper Chanyeol as an ambassador.

In October 2024, the group Bini became its new ambassador.

In November 2025, lifestyle brand Penshoppe launched their "All Together Now" holiday campaign, prominently featuring stars from Pinoy Big Brother (PBB): Celebrity Collab Edition as the newest ambassadors for the brand's exclusive roster, "Club Penshoppe". The lineup features a star-studded cast of PBB celebrities Big Four: Brent Manalo, Will Ashley, Ralph de Leon, Charlie Fleming, and AZ Martinez, alongside Bianca de Vera, Vince Maristela, and Josh Ford.

In May 2026, Penshoppe introduced Mika Salamanca as the newest member of the "Club Penshoppe" headlining the brand's campaigns "Style Codes" back-to-school collection and "Wear It Your Way" promotions. The rollout features monthly style drops centered around specific youth archetypes: For the month of May "The Rebels" it's all about edgy streetwear, oversized silhouettes, and utilitarian pieces fronting Mika Salamanca, together with co-PBB stars Brent Manalo, Charlie Fleming, and Ac Bonifacio. For the month of June "Preppy Athletes" it refers to sporty-chic vibes blending athletic comfort with classic tailored details featuring Ralph De Leon, Az Martinez, and Vince Maristela. For the month of July "Girl/Boy Next Door" it pertains to casual, everyday classic, and light neutral pieces starring Will Ashley, Bianca De Vera, and Josh Ford.

== See also ==
- Fashion and clothing in the Philippines
