= Esnyr =

Filipino social media personality (born 2001)

- Born: Esnyr John Ranollo; December 15, 2001 (age 24); Digos, Davao del Sur, Philippines
- Education: Palawan State University
- Occupations: Actor; content creator; comedian
- Years active: 2021–present
- Agent(s): Star Magic; Rise Artists Studio

YouTube information
- Channel: Esnyr
- Years active: 2024–present
- Subscribers: 2.61 million
- Views: 132 million
- Last updated: April 9, 2026

Esnyr John Ranollo (born December 15, 2001), known mononymously as Esnyr, is a Filipino social media personality, actor, and comedian. He (Note: Esnyr uses any pronouns. This article uses "he" for consistency.) joined Pinoy Big Brother: Celebrity Collab Edition and finished in third place as part of a duo with Charlie Fleming.

== Early life and education ==
Esnyr John Ranollo was born on December 15, 2001, in Davao del Sur. He studied petroleum engineering at Palawan State University.

== Career ==
Esnyr is a popular social media personality in TikTok, known for his videos depicting classic school experiences in the Philippines. He also made parodies of iconic scenes from Star Cinema movies and shows in an online show, "Star Cine-Mashup Presents: Esnyr".

In 2021, he was nominated for and won Trending TikToker of the Year at the PUSH Awards. He was also successful at the 3rd Village Pipol Choice Awards where he was nominated for and won the Breakthrough Social Media Star of the Year.

Esnyr made his acting debut in the 2021 film Love is Color Blind, top-billed by Donny Pangilinan and Belle Mariano.

He then starred as a Benison student in the television teen romantic comedy He's Into Her in 2022.

At the 2022 TikTok Awards, Esnyr was nominated for and won the Creator of the Year award and the Popular Creator of the Year award.

In 2023, Esnyr starred as Ashley in Third World Romance and as Adelle in Shake, Rattle & Roll Extreme.

At the 4th Village Pipol Choice Awards, Esnyr was nominated for Male TikTok Face of the Year but didn't win. He was also nominated as Gen-Z Approved TikTok Star at the Nylon Manila: Big, Bold, Brave Awards but did not win. However, he was nominated for and won the Most Outstanding Content Creator award at the Golden Laurel Awards.

The following year, he portrayed Ehrmengard in the film Balota.

In 2025, Esnyr became a housemate in the Pinoy Big Brother: Celebrity Collab Edition. He and his Kapuso duo Charlie Fleming emerge as the 3rd big placer duo of the first ever collab edition of the show.

Esnyr is also appeared in the film The Last Goodbye as Fiona.

At the 7th Village Pipol Choice Awards, Esnyr was nominated for Supporting Movie Actor of the Year, in Call Me Mother, as He played the role of Vince de Guzman. And was nominated for YouTuber of the Year.

== Filmography ==
=== Film ===
| Year | Title | Role | Note | Ref |
|---|---|---|---|---|
| 2021 | Love is Color Blind | Andrei/ Precious/ Balong | Supporting role | |
| 2023 | Third World Romance | Ashley | | |
| 2023 | Shake, Rattle & Roll Extreme | Adelle | segment: "Mukbang" | |
| 2024 | Balota | Ehrmengard | Supporting role | |
| 2025 | Sosyal Climbers | Shey | Supporting role | |
| 2025 | The Last Goodbye | Fiona | Supporting role | |
| 2025 | Call Me Mother | Vince de Guzman | Supporting role, Official entry for the 51st Metro Manila Film Festival | |

=== Television ===
| Year | Title | Role | Ref |
|---|---|---|---|
| 2022 | He's Into Her | Benison student | |
| 2024 | How to Spot a Red Flag | Maxie | |
| 2025 | Pinoy Big Brother: Celebrity Collab Edition | Housemate | |
| 2025 | Rainbow Rumble | Contestant | |
| 2025 | Bubble Gang | Guest | |
| 2025 | Pinoy Big Brother: Celebrity Collab Edition 2.0 | Houseguest | |
| 2025 | It's Showtime | Guest | |
| 2026 | The Secrets of Hotel 88 | Raphie Salcedo | |

=== Digital ===
| Year | Title | Role | Ref |
|---|---|---|---|
| 2022 | Star Cine-Mashup Presents: Esnyr | | |
| 2026 | Half Sisters | Ramon | |

=== Music video appearances ===
| Year | Title | Artist | Label | Ref. |
|---|---|---|---|---|
| 2025 | "First Luv" | Bini | Star Music | |

== Awards and nominations ==
| Year | Award Ceremony | Category | Result | Ref. |
|---|---|---|---|---|
| 2021 | PUSH Awards | Trending TikToker of the Year | Won | |
| 2021 | 3rd Village Pipol Choice Awards | Breakthrough Social Media Star of the Year | Won | |
| 2022 | TikTok Awards | Creator of the Year | Won | |
| 2022 | TikTok Awards | Popular Creator of the Year | Won | |
| 2023 | 4th Village Pipol Choice Awards | Male TikTok Face of the Year | Nominated | |
| 2023 | Nylon Manila: Big, Bold, Brave Awards | Gen-Z Approved TikTok Star | Nominated | |
| 2023 | Golden Laurel Awards | Most Outstanding Content Creator | Won | |
| 2024 | 5th Village Pipol Choice Awards | Content Creator of the Year | Nominated | |
| 2024 | 5th Village Pipol Choice Awards | Supporting Movie Actor of the Year | Nominated | |
| 2024 | PEP Most Influential in Entertainment 2024 | Social Media Superstar | Won | |
| 2024 | 5th Gawad Balisong | Outstanding Filipino Gamechangers of 2024 | Nominated | |
| 2024 | TAG Awards Chicago | Creator of the Year | Won | |
| 2025 | 7th Gawad Lasallianeta | Most Outstanding Vlogger | Won | |
| 2025 | 10th Platinum Stallion National Media Awards | Social Media Personality of the Year | Won | |
| 2025 | 6th Village Pipol Choice Awards | YouTuber of the Year | Won | |
| 2026 | 8th Gawad Lasallianeta | Most Outstanding Social Media Personality | Won | |
| 2026 | 7th Village Pipol Choice Awards | YouTuber of the Year | Pending | |
| 2026 | 7th Village Pipol Choice Awards | Supporting Movie Actor of the Year | Pending | |

== See also ==
- Brent Manalo
- Mika Salamanca
- Ralph de Leon
- Will Ashley
- Charlie Fleming
- River Joseph
- AZ Martinez
- Shuvee Etrata
- Klarisse de Guzman
- Ivana Alawi
