= What If Tayo? =

Single by Mika Salamanca and Brent Manalo
- Language: English; Filipino
- English title: What If Us?
- Released: September 12, 2025
- Length: 3:36
- Label: Star
- Songwriter: Jonathan Manalo
- Producer: Jonathan Manalo

Mika Salamanca singles chronology
| "Sino Nga Ba Siya" (2025) | "What If Tayo?" (2025) | "Kasalanan" (2026) |

What If Tayo? (transl. What If Us?) is a song by the Filipino internet personality Mika Salamanca and Filipino actor Brent Manalo. It was released on September 12, 2025, through Star Music, written and produced by Jonathan Manalo. "What If Tayo" explores the dynamic between two best friends, centering on the possibility of their bond into a romantic relationship.

== Background and release ==
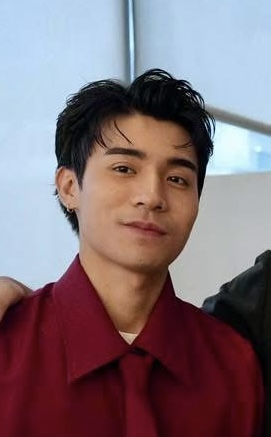
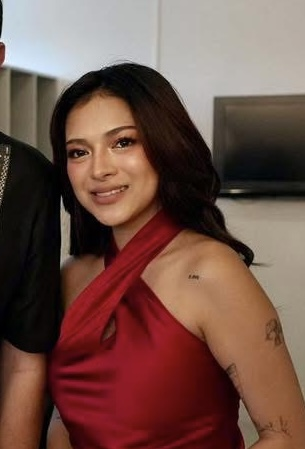
Brent Manalo (left) and Mika Salamanca (right)

Brent and Mika were declared the winners of Pinoy Big Brother: Celebrity Collab Edition at the grand finale on July 5 at the New Frontier Theater in Quezon City. The pair, known as "BreKa", received 33 percent of the combined votes and each won a cash prize of ₱1 million (US$20,304.57). On August 7, Salamanca released a cover of Sarah Geronimo's song "Sino Nga Ba Siya" (transl. Who Is He?), following the circulation of a viral video showing a younger version of her appeared to be her P.E uniform, running before dropping to the floor while singing a line.

Following the cover song, Salamanca and Manalo released their single "What If Tayo" on digital streaming platforms, along with a lyric video.

== Composition ==
"What If Tayo" is three minutes and thirty-six seconds song. It was written and produced by Jonathan Manalo. The track explores the story of two best friends reflecting on the possibility of their relationship turning romantic. It was initially teased by Star Music through a fan fiction by Salamanca and Manalo. The lyric video accumulated over 312,000 views on YouTube within five days of release and the song was included in Spotify's New Music Friday Philippines playlist.

== Music video ==
The music video, released on September 27, 2025, runs for five minutes and portrays a story of friendship with hints of unspoken feelings. It begins with Mika and Brent exchanging glances in a park before engaging in a cup-stacking game. He appears conflicted about confessing his emotions but dismisses the thoughts. As scene develops, Salamanca address him in Kapampangan, expressing that she has something important to share. She asks if he feels anything to her, to which Manalo replies that he does, though the lightens the moment by joking it is mostly from the "headache" caused by her constant stories. Later, they are shown reflecting on their bond, with Brent voicing his fear of losing their friendship. Mika reassures him that she chooses him every day, and the sequence concludes with him affirming that he chooses her as well.

== Credits ==
Credits are adapted by Apple Music and music video.

- Brent Manalo – lead vocal
- Mika Salamanca – lead vocal
- Gab Tagadtad – mastering engineer, mixing engineer
- Janno Queyquep – arranger, guitar
- Jonathan Manalo – producer, songwriter
