= Shuvee Etrata =

Filipino actress, model, host, and content creator (born 2001)

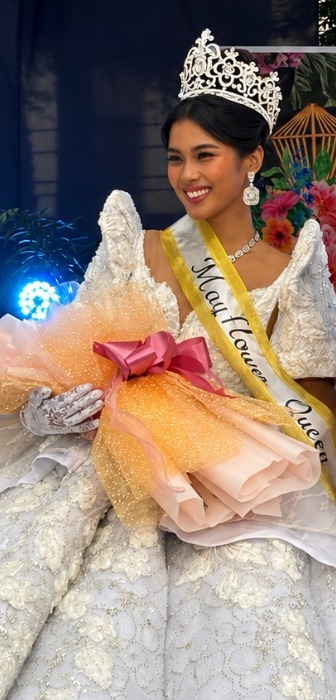
- Etrata as the Mayflower Queen at Flores de Mayo in 2026
- Born: Shuvee Chrisna Villanueva Etrata; June 4, 2001 (age 25); Bantayan Island, Cebu, Philippines
- Occupations: Model; actress; host; content creator
- Years active: 2021–present
- Agent: Sparkle
- Height: 5 ft 6 in (1.68 m)

TikTok information
- Page: Shuvee Etrata
- Followers: 4.5 million (as of August 16, 2025)

Shuvee Chrisna Villanueva Etrata (born June 4, 2001) is a Filipino model, actress, host, and content creator.

== Early life and education ==
Shuvee Chrisna Villanueva Etrata was born on June 4, 2001 in Bantayan Island, Cebu. She spent much of her childhood in Polomolok, South Cotabato, Philippines, her father's hometown. She was named after the initials of the University of Visayas (UV), as her parents Michael and Jorina had met at the school. She is the eldest of nine siblings and has been financially supporting her family with her earnings as a content creator.

According to Etrata, others bullied her in her home province due to her morena complexion, although when she moved to Manila, she found that the entertainment industry considered her brown skin to be an asset.

Etrata studied physical therapy at the Cebu Doctors' University, commuting from Compostela to Cebu City for her classes, as her father did not permit her to stay in a boarding house. However, she decided to pursue show business instead because she saw it as an easier way to support her family, whereas becoming a physical therapist was a long process. Her conversation with her mother before joining Pinoy Big Brother: Celebrity Collab Edition (PBB) went viral when a Facebook post translated the original Cebuano into Tagalog. Etrata had said, "Ma, PBB is my last big shot. If showbiz (show business) really isn't for me, I'll go back to Cebu and finish my studies."

== Career ==
On June 29, 2019, Etrata was announced as one of the 14 candidates for the Mutya ng Pilipinas Cebu pageant, representing the municipality of Santa Fe. On July 11, she advanced to the Top 7 of the competition, but did not win any of the pageant's titles. She represented Bantayan at the Hiyas ng Pilipinas pageant in 2022.

Etrata was featured in a SunStar Cebu article in January 2022, introduced as a model, endorser, and beauty queen.

In March 2023, Etrata was announced as a cast member of Hearts on Ice. It was her first time acting in a teleserye. She addressed comparisons to Maymay Entrata in an interview with the Philippine Entertainment Portal (PEP), published on March 24. She acknowledged that their surnames sounded similar and that they were both Bisaya, hence the comparisons. Etrata also explained her plans to compete in Miss Universe when she was older and felt more ready. PEP writer Jojo Gabinete pointed out that Etrata's height, brown skin, and "very Filipina" facial features made her a good fit for beauty pageants. In that month, she also starred alongside Barbie Forteza and David Licauco in "The Way You Look at Me", the music video for Ben&Ben's rendition of a Christian Bautista song of the same name. In August, she appeared as Natty in episodes of the drama anthology series Tadhana (transl. Destiny) along with Ashley Ortega and Radson Flores.

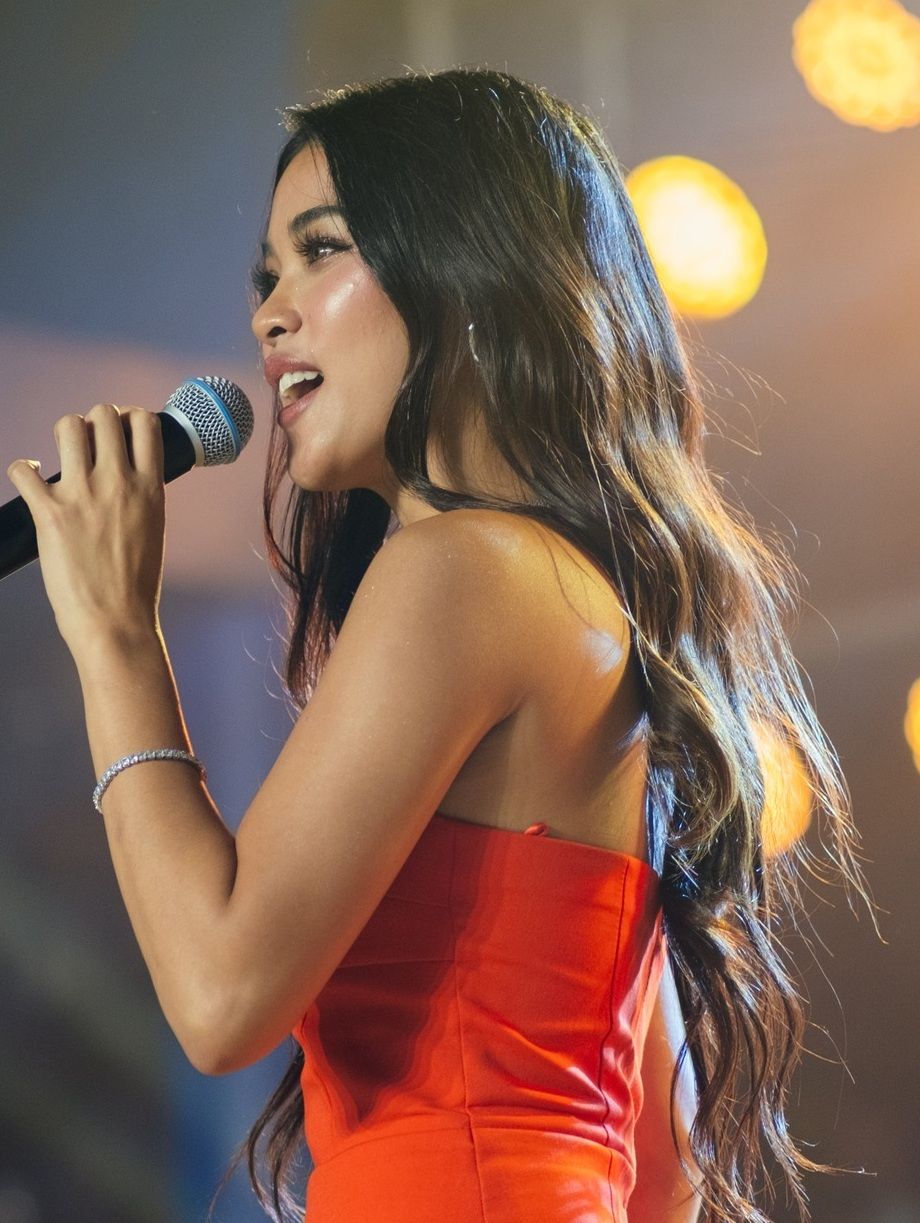
Etrata in August 2025

Etrata portrayed Feline in "Captain Kitten", an episode of Daig Kayo ng Lola Ko (international title: My Fairy Grandmother) that aired when the anthology series returned in October. On November 7, Etrata competed on an episode of the Philippine game show Family Feud. Her response to the question "What is the maximum capacity of a tricycle?" went viral on social media, after she answered "12." Many people online expressed their confusion over Etrata's answer, while others argued that it was not technically incorrect, as tricycles found in other provinces could accommodate significantly more passengers than the ones in Metro Manila.

In December 2024, Etrata was the host at a press conference of the film Green Bones in Cebu. She admitted that she preferred hosting over acting, although she was making an effort to improve her acting through workshops. She added that she hoped to star in a romantic comedy in the future.

In 2025, she joined Pinoy Big Brother: Celebrity Collab Edition (PBB) with the goal of being able to buy a house and lot for her family. She was evicted from the PBB house on June 14, alongside Klarisse De Guzman. Their duo was given the name of "ShuKla".

Etrata portrayed Veshdita in the fantasy drama series Encantadia Chronicles: Sang'gre.

On August 22, she starred in the music video for "Marupok" by Jenzen Guino. In the video, she and Anthony Constantino portray a couple who slowly fall in love after filming a commercial together.

In April 2026, Etrata was hand-picked by celebrity photographer BJ Pascual as his new muse. Their first photoshoot together features Etrata posing in architectural clothes designed by Rajo Laurel and Lance Ernest Rubio, inspired by the painting Sabel by Filipino painter Benedicto Cabrera.

== Media image ==
Nylon Manila's Rafael Bautista praised Etrata for being the "Gen Z morena representation that we need". He added that she sets an example for her audience, as a young woman who has achieved success without conforming to "toxic" beauty standards. In an interview with Preview, makeup artist Thazzia Falek said that Etrata has one of the most beautiful faces that she has seen. Falek further described her as a "true Filipina beauty".

In April 2026, Chin Ann Obiedo of the fashion magazine Metro called Etrata "the beauty muse to watch".

=== Endorsements ===
In March 2023, Etrata was appointed as a Tourism Promotions Board for Badian, Cebu's Philippines Ambassador. She was also featured in a billboard in EDSA for Jag (stylized in all caps) Jeans. On July 5, 2025, Shopee Philippines unveiled Etrata as their "Shopee Bestie". In 2025, Etrata was announced as one of Acerpure's newest ambassadors. On September 10, Etrata was unveiled as one of Mang Inasal's new endorsers, alongside Ralph de Leon. The two acted out a romantic skit in the official announcement post and were introduced with a portmanteau name, "ShuRalph". In December, Etrata was unveiled as one of the new ambassadors for the wellness brand IAM Worldwide, alongside Charlie Fleming.

== Filmography ==
=== Film ===
Shuvee Etrata's television credits with year of release, film titles and roles
Year	Title	Role	Ref.
2025	Call Me Mother	Ria de Guzman	
2026	Huwag Kang Titingin	Diane Alfreta	
2026	Red Crown †		

=== Television ===
Shuvee Etrata's television credits with year of release, film titles and roles
Year	Title	Role	Ref.
2023	Bubble Gang	Various	
2023	Hearts on Ice	Kring-Kring	
2023	Tadhana ("Pagtatapos")	Natty	
2023	Daig Kayo Ng Lola Ko ("Captain Kitten")	Feline	
2023–2024	Family Feud	Herself (guest player)	
2023–2024	The Boobay and Tekla Show	Herself (guest)	
2023–2025	TiktoClock	Herself (guest)	
2023–2025	Unang Hirit	Herself (segment host)	
2024	Magpakailanman ("Crazy In Love: The Irene Franca Story")	Fritzie	
2024	Sarap, 'Di Ba?	Herself (guest)	
2024	Lilet Matias: Attorney-at-Law	Miles	
2024	Fast Talk with Boy Abunda	Herself (guest)	
2025	Lutong Bahay	Herself (host)	
2025	Pinoy Big Brother: Celebrity Collab Edition	Herself (housemate)	
2025	Encantadia Chronicles: Sang'gre	Veshdita	
2025	Magpakailanman ("Pinoy Big Breadwinner: The Shuvee Etrata Story")	Herself	
2025	It's Showtime	Herself (guest)	
2025	Pinoy Big Brother: Celebrity Collab Edition 2.0	Herself (houseguest)	
2026	The Master Cutter	Tonet	
2026	From Vlog to Love	Angge	
2026	Barangay Love Stories ("Torete")	Aya	

=== Music video appearances ===
Shuvee Etrata's television credits with year of release, film titles and roles
Year	Title	Artist	Ref.
2023	"The Way You Look At Me"	Ben&Ben	
2025	"Marupok"	Jenzen Guino	
