= Anthony Constantino =

Filipino model, influencer, and actor (born 2002)

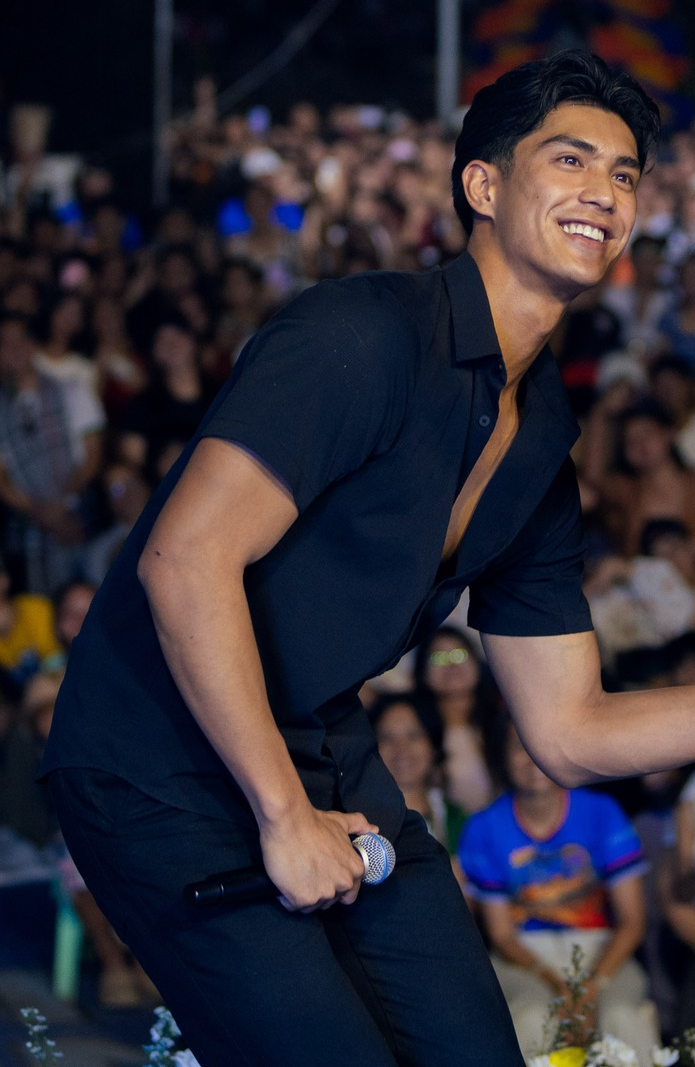
- Constantino in August 2025
- Born: Anthony Delos Reyes Constantino; May 30, 2002 (age 24); Los Angeles, California, U.S.
- Education: California Lutheran University
- Occupations: Model; influencer; actor
- Years active: 2022–present
- Agent: Sparkle
- Height: 6 ft 1 in (1.85 m)

Anthony Delos Reyes Constantino (born May 30, 2002) is an American model, influencer, and actor based in the Philippines. He first signed with Otto Models in 2022. In July 2024, he modeled the Philippine delegation's uniform, a barong designed by Francis Libiran, at the 2024 Summer Olympics in Paris. In December, he starred in Esnyr's online series Highschool Hell Week as a "red flag" love interest and also appeared in an episode of the American TV show The Sex Lives of College Girls.

In April 2025, Constantino signed with Sparkle. He has modeled for magazines such as Parcinq and earned media attention for attending fashion events for brands like Vogue Philippines and Louis Vuitton as a guest. His relationship with Filipino model and actress Shuvee Etrata has also received significant press coverage. In the Philippines, he is widely associated with the term "TDH (tall, dark, and handsome)", as popularized by Etrata.

== Early life and education ==
Anthony Delos Reyes Constantino was born to Filipino parents on May 30, 2002, in Los Angeles, California, USA. He graduated highschool in 2020 from St Margaret’s Episcopal School in San Juan Capistrano, California. In 2024, he graduated from the California Lutheran University with a dual degree, a Bachelor of Science in Computer Information Systems and Business Administration in Marketing. From 2022 to 2024, he was a part-time Technical Specialist at Apple Inc.

== Career ==
=== 2022–present: Modeling, acting endeavors ===
Constantino's career began in 2022, when he signed with the Otto Models agency in Los Angeles. He posed for The Perfect Man magazine section of L'Homme Nu (transl. The Naked Man). In July 2024, he modeled the official uniform of the Philippine delegation at the 2024 Summer Olympics in Paris. The uniform, a barong, was designed by Francis Libiran. In June and July, he posed for a few photoshoots in the Filipino fashion magazine Parcinq as well. In December, he appeared as a "red flag" love interest in Esnyr's Highschool (Note: [sic]) Hell Week online series and as a waiter in an episode of the American show The Sex Lives of College Girls.

On April 8, 2025, Constantino signed with Sparkle. Since moving to the Philippines, he has signed with DT Model Management, also based in Los Angeles, and Main Models in Manila. On June 18, he was one of the guests at the 15th Mega Ball. On June 20, he also appeared as a guest on the morning talk show Unang Hirit (transl. First Strike). On August 6, he was a guest at Vogue Philippines' Vogue Studios Launch Party. He appeared again on Unang Hirit on August 12. In the same month, he was a guest at an exclusive Louis Vuitton event at Greenbelt, previewing the brand's Fall/Winter 2025 Men's Collection. Constantino himself wore items from the collection during the event. On August 22, he starred in the music video for "Marupok" by Jenzen Guino. In the video, he and Shuvee Etrata portray a couple who slowly fall in love after filming a commercial together.

In May 2026, he became a trend to Exploring Manila.

== Media image ==
Constantino is widely associated with Etrata's viral use of the phrase "tall, dark, and handsome (TDH)". She first used it to describe Filipino actor Donny Pangilinan on Pinoy Big Brother. However, various publications have described Constantino with the phrase too, as well as Etrata herself. Arci Claveria of Metro Style wrote that Constantino was the "pure embodiment of the acronym" and described him as a "real-life Prince Charming" with "sun-drenched features". Nylon Manila's Rafael Bautista praised Constantino, alongside Etrata, as a "moreno and morena power duo". He added that the two's public romance showed that brown skin can be desirable.

== Filmography ==
=== Film ===
Year	Title	Role	Ref.
2024	The Disadvantages of Seeing God	Hospital guard	
2026	Huwag Kang Titingin	Miggy "Migz" Quirante	

=== Online/Digital ===
Year	Title	Role	Ref.
2024	Highschool Hell Week	Love interest	
2026	From Vlog to Love	Bullet	

=== Television ===
Year	Title	Role	Ref.
2022	TiktoClock	Himself	
2024	The Sex Lives of College Girls	Waiter	
2025	Unang Hirit	Himself	
2025	Sparkle Campus Cutie	Himself	
2026	The Master Cutter	Jason	
2026	Barangay Love Stories ("Torete")	Leo	
2026	Pinoy Big Brother: Collab 3.0	Himself (Housemate)	

=== Music videos ===
Shuvee Etrata's television credits with year of release, film titles and roles
Year	Title	Artist	Ref.
2025	"Marupok"	Jenzen Guino	
