= The Secrets of Hotel 88 =

2026 Philippine television drama series

- Title card
- Genre: Family drama; Mystery
- Directed by: Henry King Quitain
- Starring: Mika Salamanca; Brent Manalo; Will Ashley; Ralph de Leon; Esnyr; AZ Martinez; River Joseph; Dustin Yu; Bianca de Vera; Klarisse de Guzman; Xyriel Manabat; Josh Ford; Kira Balinger
- Country of origin: Philippines
- Original language: Tagalog
- No. of episodes: 83

Production
- Production locations: Puerto Galera, Oriental Mindoro
- Camera setup: Multiple-camera setup
- Production company: Star Creatives

Original release
- Network: iWant
- Release: February 23 – June 19, 2026
- Network: GMA Network
- Release: March 2 – June 26, 2026

The Secrets of Hotel 88 is a 2026 Philippine television drama mystery series streaming on iWant and broadcast by GMA Network. Directed by Henry King Quitain, it stars Mika Salamanca, Brent Manalo, Will Ashley, Ralph de Leon, Esnyr, AZ Martinez, River Joseph, Dustin Yu, Bianca de Vera, Klarisse de Guzman, Xyriel Manabat, Josh Ford and Kira Balinger. The series premiered on iWant on February 23, 2026, and concluded on June 19, 2026, with a total of 83 episodes. The television broadcast premiered on March 2, 2026, on GMA Network's Prime line up. It ended on June 26, 2026.

== Premise ==
Brothers Martin, Francis, and Gio are reunited after the death of their estranged father. They inherited the "haunted" Hotel 88, which has a history of unsettled situations and old secrets. The Almazan family—consisting of Jade, Justin, Luna and Leon compete for their stake of the hotel.

== Cast and characters ==
=== Main cast ===
- Mika Salamanca as Luna Almazan, the eldest daughter of the Almazan family, with a strong-willed attitude.
- Brent Manalo as Gio Cabrera, the hot-headed eldest son of Michael and half-brother of Kiko and Martin.
- Will Ashley as Kiko Endaya, the youngest son of Michael and half-brother of Gio and Martin. He is the most easygoing among the brothers and cares the most about Michael. He is also Chesca's half-brother through their mother, Georgia.
- Ralph de Leon as Martin Madrigal, a businessman and the second son of Michael. He is the half-brother of Kiko and Martin through Michael, and Trixie's half-brother through their mother, Lourdes.
- Esnyr as Raphie Salcedo, one of Hotel 88's hoteliers and Monette's sibling.
- AZ Martinez as Sari Garcia, a hopeless romantic guest of Hotel 88.
- River Joseph as Leon Almazan, the reserved but responsible eldest son of the Almazan family.
- Dustin Yu as Edward Arellano, a friend of the Almazan family who forms a connection with Jade.
- Bianca de Vera as Jade Almazan, the youngest child of the Almazan family.
- Klarisse de Guzman as Monette Salcedo, one of Hotel 88's hoteliers and Raphie's sister.
- Xyriel Manabat as Chesca Endaya, Kiko's half-sister.
- Josh Ford as Justin Almazan, the youngest son and second-youngest of the Almazan family.
- Kira Balinger as Trixie Madrigal, a businesswoman and Martin's half-sister.

=== Supporting cast ===
- Gardo Versoza as Michael
- Dominic Ochoa as Frederico
- Ina Raymundo as Frida

=== Guest cast ===
- Christian Vasquez as Sandro
- Emilio Daez as Juan Soliman
- Vince Maristela as Peter Montevilla

== Production ==
On September 18, 2025, GMA Network Inc. and ABS-CBN announced Star Creatives' development of the series along cast members. Star Creatives' business unit head, Des de Guzman, stated the series was created with the actors in mind, after seeing their Pinoy Big Brother: Celebrity Collab Edition. Principal photography commenced in October 2025, in Puerto Galera, Oriental Mindoro. Filming wrapped on March 20, 2026.

== Release ==
The series became available for streaming on the streaming service, iWant on February 23, 2026. The television broadcast premiered on March 2, 2026, on GMA Network.

== Ratings ==
According to AGB Nielsen Philippines' Nationwide Urban Television Audience Measurement People in television homes, the pilot episode of The Secrets of Hotel 88 on GMA Network, earned a 4.2% rating. The final episode scored a 4.7% rating.
