= Josh Ford (actor) =

Filipino actor

- Born: Portsmouth, England
- Education: Quezon City Science High School
- Occupation: Actor
- Years active: 2015–present
- Agent: Sparkle GMA Artist Center (2015-present)

Josh Ford is a Filipino actor under the management of Sparkle GMA Artist Center. He has gained recognition for his versatile performances in various television series and films in the Philippines.

== Early life and education ==
Josh Ford was born in Portsmouth, England and is of British and Filipino descent. He was raised in a middle-class household by his Filipino mother, a single parent, and has a brother and two sisters. He participated in school plays and local theater productions during his childhood. After completing his schooling in England, his family relocated to Quezon City, Philippines, to reconnect with their Filipino heritage.

He briefly attended Quezon City Science High School for Grades 7 and 8 before pursuing his acting career.

== Career ==
Ford began his entertainment career as a child star, appearing in various commercials for prominent brands in the Philippines. In 2015, he portrayed the young version of Clark Medina, a character played by James Reid, in the popular ABS-CBN television drama series On the Wings of Love. The following year, he appeared in the romantic drama film This Time, playing the younger version of Coby Martinez, a role also played by Reid.

In 2017, Ford took a brief hiatus from the entertainment industry and relocated to the United Kingdom with his family following his father's death. He returned to the Philippines and joined Sparkle GMA Artist Center in 2023. His comeback was marked by roles in several television series including Luv Is: Love at First Read (2023) as Razille Traijin Train Zapusumo and Jose & Maria's Bonggang Villa (2024) as Gio Wagas. In 2025, he participated as a housemate in Pinoy Big Brother: Celebrity Collab Edition, where he represented the United Kingdom with the moniker "Ang Survivor Lad ng United Kingdom." He was evicted on Day 63, alongside duo-partner Ralph de Leon, finishing 13th overall in the season.

== Personal life ==
Ford took a break from acting when his family moved to the United Kingdom after his father's passing in 2017. Following his father's death, he took time to grieve and support his family before deciding to return to the Philippines to pursue his acting career.

On March 24, 2023, Ford was involved in a tragic car accident in Quezon City that claimed the lives of fellow Sparkle artist Andrei Sison, driver Paolo Bueza, and another passenger, Arman Velasco. Ford was the sole survivor of the crash. Reflecting on the incident during a conversation with Pinoy Big Brother host Gabbi Garcia, he expressed profound grief over the loss of his friends, whom he considered family.

== Filmography ==
=== Films ===
Year	Title	Role	Ref.
2016	This Time	Second Generation Coby Martinez	
2026	Huwag Kang Titingin	Calvin "Onat" Angeles	

=== Television ===
Year	Title	Role
2015	On the Wings of Love	Young Clark Medina
2016	Maalaala Mo Kaya: Backpack	Young Tommy
2016	Maalaala Mo Kaya: Puno ng Mangga	Young Samson
2023	Luv Is: Love at First Read	Razille Traijin "Train" Zapusumo
2023	Regal Studio Presents: Hot Momma	Andrei
2023-2024	TiktoClock	Himself / Guest
2024	Pepito Manaloto: Tuloy ang Kuwento	Lucas
2024	Jose & Maria's Bonggang Villa	Gio Wagas
2024	My Guardian Alien	Aries
2025	Maka	Josh Taylor
2025	Pinoy Big Brother: Celebrity Collab Edition	Himself / Housemate
2025	It's Showtime	Himself / Performer / Guest
2025	Rainbow Rumble	Himself / Contestant
2025–present	All-Out Sundays	Himself / Performer / Co-host
2025	Maka Lovestream	Grant
2026	The Secrets of Hotel 88	Justin Almazan
2026	Barangay Love Stories: Paraiso	Lui

== Awards and nominations ==
Year	Award	Category	Result
2023	Asian Business Excellence Awards	Promising Young Actor of the Year	Won
