= Brent Manalo =

Filipino actor (born 1997)

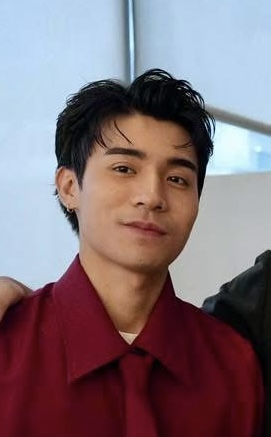
- Manalo in 2025
- Born: Lesyel Brent Romero Manalo; December 6, 1997 (age 28); Capas, Tarlac, Philippines
- Education: De La Salle University (BSADV)
- Occupations: Actor; model; content creator
- Years active: 2020–present
- Agent: Star Magic
- Height: 175 cm (5 ft 9 in)
- Title: PBB Collab 1.0; Big Winner (with Mika Salamanca)
- Predecessor: (Gen 11) Fyang Smith
- Successor: (Collab Edition 2.0) Caprice Cayetano & Lella Ford
- Website: YouTube; Instagram

Brent Manalo (born Lesyel Brent Romero Manalo; December 6, 1997) is a Filipino actor, model, and content creator. He has appeared in various television productions, gaining attention for his roles in series such as Ampalaya Chronicles (2020), Beach Bros (2022), The Broken Marriage Vow (2022), and The Secrets of Hotel 88 (2026).

Beyond acting, he became widely known after joining Pinoy Big Brother: Celebrity Collab Edition (2025), where he emerged as the Kapamilya Big Winner.

== Early life and education ==
Lesyel Brent Romero Manalo was born on December 6, 1997, in Capas, Tarlac. He attended Wellspring High School, where he graduated as valedictorian. He studied at De La Salle University in Manila, earning a Bachelor of Science in Advertising Management, graduating cum laude. While at university, he was a consistent Dean's Lister, a nominee for the Jose Rizal Honors Society and "Best Thesis", and a recipient of the Ninoy Aquino Leadership Award.

== Career ==
=== Early career ===
In 2014, Manalo launched his YouTube channel, where he focused on travel vlogs and lifestyle content.

In 2018, shortly after graduating from college, he landed a campaign for an international fast-fashion brand. A week later, he was invited by Johnny Manahan of Star Magic to audition. While attending workshops, Manalo continued modeling and eventually expanded into content creation, focusing on lifestyle and fashion. In 2022, he secured a role in the top-rated TV drama series The Broken Marriage Vow.

=== Acting ===
Manalo made his acting debut in 2020 with the iWant series Ampalaya Chronicles, portraying the character Jeric. He later appeared in The Broken Marriage Vow (2022) as Miguel "Migs" Ilustre and in Beach Bros (2022) as Jason Coral.

In 2024, he appeared in the Hayskul Crush series by content creator and fellow housemate Esnyr, where he played a role in a love triangle alongside actor Shan Vesagas. The series is available on Esnyr's YouTube and TikTok channels.

The following year, Manalo participated as a housemate in Pinoy Big Brother: Celebrity Collab Edition, emerging as the season's winners alongside his duo partner, Mika Salamanca.

== Philanthropy ==
After securing the title of Big Winner on the reality program Pinoy Big Brother, Manalo, together with his partner on the show, Mika Salamanca, donated their winnings to Duyan ni Maria, a Pampanga-based non-profit organization dedicated to providing education and support for underprivileged children.

== Filmography ==
=== Television ===
Year	Title	Role	Notes
2020	Ampalaya Chronicles	Jeric	Supporting role
2022	The Broken Marriage Vow	Miguel "Migs" Illustre	Supporting role
2022	Beach Bros	Jason Coral	Main cast
2022	Dear MOR Celebrity Specials: The Alvin Story	Alvin	Lead role Audio drama
2022–present	ASAP	Himself	Performer
2024–present	It's Showtime	Himself	Guest / Guest Hurado / performer / guest co-host
2025	Pinoy Big Brother: Celebrity Collab Edition	Himself	Housemate Kapamilya Big Winner
2025	Unang Hirit	Himself	Guest
2025	Fast Talk with Boy Abunda	Himself	Guest
2025	TiktoClock	Himself	Guest (2 episodes)
2025	Family Feud	Himself	Contestant (2 episodes)
2025	Rainbow Rumble	Himself	Contestant
2025–2026	All-Out Sundays	Himself	Guest / performer (2 episodes)
2026	Pinoy Big Brother: Celebrity Collab Edition 2.0	Himself	Houseguest
2026	The Secrets of Hotel 88	Gio Cabrera	Main cast
2026	Everybody, Sing!	Himself	Guest
2026	Half Sisters	Pancho	Supporting Role

=== Films ===
Year	Title	Role	Note	Producer
2025	The Four Bad Boys and Me	Shawn Lucas Dela Fuente	Supporting role, online digital film	ABS-CBN Studios & Lonewolf Films
2025	Call Me Mother	Marco de Guzman	Supporting role, entry for the 51st Metro Manila Film Festival 2025	ABS-CBN Studios, The IdeaFirst Company, Viva Films, & Star Cinema
2026	The Greatest Showdown			

=== Music video appearances ===
Year	Title	Artists	Note
2019	"Abot Langit"	Maris Racal ft. Rico Blanco	ABS-CBN Star Music
2022	"Cuz of You"	Kyla & Bryan Mcknight Jr.	Tarsier Records
2023	"Matapang"	Vivoree	ABS-CBN Star Music
2023	"Dalawang Isip"	Vivoree	ABS-CBN Star Music
2023	"Sayaw Ng Mga Tala"	Vivoree X Benedix	ABS-CBN Star Music
2024	"Apat na Buwan"	Janine	Viva Music Publishing, Inc.
2024	"Be All Mine"	Jillian Ward	SPARKLE GMA
2024	"Wag Paglaruan"	Fana ft. Tiara Shaye	ABS-CBN Star Music
2025	"Ako Na Lang"	The Juans	VIVA Records
2025	"What If Tayo?"	Brent Manalo & Mika Salamanca	ABS-CBN Star Music
2026	“Pareho Tayong Nahihiya”	Brent Manalo & Analain Salvador	ABS-CBN Star Music
2026	“Tell Me How”	Brent Manalo	ABS-CBN StarMusic

== Discography ==
=== Extended plays ===
Year	Album	Song title	Performed by	Label
2026	Lover Boy	"Pareho Tayong Nahihiya"	Brent Manalo	StarPop
2026	Lover Boy	"Sa'yo Lang"	Brent Manalo	StarPop
2026	Lover Boy	"Tell Me How"	Brent Manalo	StarPop
2026	Lover Boy	"Ikaw sa Bilyon"	Brent Manalo	StarPop
2026	Lover Boy	"Malay Ko"	Brent Manalo	StarPop

=== Singles ===
Year	Track	Details	Label
2025	"What If Tayo?"	Duet with Mika Salamanca	Star Music
2025	"Pasko ang Pinakamagandang Kwento"	Cover duet with Mika Salamanca	Star Music

== Awards and nominations ==
Award ceremony	Year	Category	Result	Ref.
Anak TV Seal Awards	2025	Male Net Makabata Star	Won	
8th Gawad Lasallianeta Awards	2025	Zeal Award for Excellence as Lasallian Public Personality	Won	
7th Village Pipol Choice Awards	2026	Fashion Influencer of the Year	Won	
7th Village Pipol Choice Awards	2026	Music Video of the Year	Won	
7th Village Pipol Choice Awards	2026	Promising Male Star of the Year	Nominated	
7th Alta Media Icon Awards	2026	Most Promising Male Star	Won	
