= Bianca de Vera =

Filipino actress (born 2002)

- Born: Bianca Franchesca Batu Dimapilis; February 7, 2002 (age 24); Antipolo, Rizal, Philippines
- Occupation: Actress
- Years active: 2011–2012; 2021–present

Bianca Franchesca Batu Dimapilis (born February 7, 2002), known professionally as Bianca de Vera, is a Filipino actress. She is best known for playing the roles of Patricia Cunanan on 2 Good 2 Be True (2022), which aired on the Kapamilya Channel, and Gwen Zhang on Unbreak My Heart (2023), which aired on GMA Network.

De Vera gained further public recognition as a contestant on Pinoy Big Brother: Celebrity Collab Edition (2025).

== Personal life ==
De Vera was born as Bianca Franchesca Batu Dimapilis on February 7, 2002, in Antipolo, Rizal, Philippines to Mon Dimapilis and Aileen Therese Batu-Dimapilis.

De Vera is also known to participate occasionally in rallycross driving, a skill she learned from her father, a professional racer.

De Vera had a pet corgi, Peach, who died in 2025.

== Career ==
De Vera began her career in television as a contestant on Junior MasterChef Pinoy Edition in 2011, where she placed ninth. Following the competition, De Vera prioritized her education before eventually transitioning into a career in acting. She reemerged in the public eye in 2020, after joining TikTok, where she gained attention for her videos documenting her daily life.

In 2021, she signed with Rise Artists Studio, the arm management of Star Magic.

In 2022, she marked her return to the entertainment industry by joining the cast of the television series 2 Good 2 Be True. In the show, she portrayed Pat, the younger sister of Kathryn Bernardo's character.

In 2023, De Vera appeared in a supporting role in the iWantTFC (now iWant) digital series Teen Clash, an adaptation of the Wattpad series of the same name. She portrayed Yannie Seung, the sassy best friend of the main character. Later that year, De Vera was part of a historic collaboration between GMA and ABS-CBN in the series Unbreak My Heart. She played Gwen Zhang, a wealthy young woman who falls in love with Jerry, portrayed by Will Ashley. In 2024, she played a supporting role as Tin in the romantic drama film Un/Happy for You.

De Vera gained mainstream attention when she joined Pinoy Big Brother: Celebrity Collab Edition in 2025. Representing her hometown, she was dubbed "Ang Sassy Unica Hija ng Taguig." In the show, she reunited with Unbreak My Heart co-star, Ashley.

== Filmography ==
Key
†	Denotes films or TV productions that have not yet been released

=== Film ===
Year	Title	Role	Ref.
2024	Un/Happy For You	Tin	
2025	Love You So Bad	Savannah "Vanna" Aquino	

=== Television ===
Year	Title	Role	Ref.
2011–12	Junior MasterChef Pinoy Edition	Herself (contestant)	
2022	2 Good 2 Be True	Patricia Cunanan	
2023	Teen Clash	Yannie Seung	
2023	Unbreak My Heart	Gwen Zhang	
2025	Pinoy Big Brother: Celebrity Collab Edition	Herself (contestant)	
2025	It's Okay To Not Be Okay	Bella	
2026	The Secrets of Hotel 88	Jade Almazan	

=== Web ===
Year	Title	Role	Ref.
2022	Plate Twists	with Gillian Vicencio	
2023	Rise and Go	with co-artists from Rise Artists Studio	
