= AZ Martinez =

Filipino actress, host and beauty queen (born 2003)

- Born: Azriel Atira Martinez Coloma; March 2, 2003 (age 23); Tacloban City, Philippines
- Citizenship: Filipino
- Education: Treston International College
- Occupations: Actress; beauty queen; host
- Years active: 2022–present
- Agent: Sparkle (2023–present)
- Height: 5 ft 3 in (160 cm)
- Website: Official website

Azriel "AZ" Atira Martinez Coloma (born March 2, 2003) is a Filipino actress, beauty pageant queen, and television host. Currently managed by Sparkle GMA Artist Center, the talent agency of GMA Network, she began her acting career with minor roles on the network's television programs. In addition to acting, Martinez has competed in beauty pageants, including Hiyas ng Pilipinas and Summit International Pageants, where she was crowned Miss Elite Philippines and Miss Summit International, respectively.

Martinez gained public recognition as a housemate on the Philippine television reality show Pinoy Big Brother: Celebrity Collab Edition, where she was named Fourth Big Placer.

== Early life ==
Azriel Atira Martinez Coloma was born on March 2, 2003, in Tacloban City. She went to Maria Montessori International School in Cebu during her high school years, where she pursued the Accountancy, Business, and Management (ABM) strand. Martinez currently attends Treston International College, where she is pursuing a degree in Marketing while still actively working as an actress.

== Career ==
=== Pageantry ===
Before entering the entertainment industry, Martinez joined several beauty pageants. In 2018, at the age of 15, Martinez was named Ms. Milo Little Olympics in the secondary division at the 31st Milo Little Olympics (MLO) Visayas Regional Finals. Martinez was also the muse for the Terrafirma Dyip during the 2022–2023 Philippine Basketball Association (PBA) season.

In 2022, she won the Hiyas ng Pilipinas pageant and received the title Miss Elite Philippines. As the titleholder, she represented the country at Miss Summit International 2023 in Florida, United States, where she was crowned the overall winner. Her victory at Miss Summit International 2023 marked a historic "back-to-back" win for the Philippines, following Nica Zosa Nabua's victory in 2022. She later shared her aspirations to transition into acting and hosting, expressing her desire to focus on her acting career with GMA's Sparkle Artist Center and her interest in pursuing hosting opportunities.

=== Entertainment career ===
In 2023, Martinez signed a contract with GMA Network's talent agency, Sparkle. She made her acting debut in a recurring role as Jessica Tang in Mano Po Legacy: The Flower Sisters (2022–2023). She also had a minor role in The Missing Husband, Pepito Manaloto: Tuloy ang Kuwento, and Luv Is: Love at First Read in the same year.

In 2024, Martinez appeared in an episode of Amazing Earth, where she participated in a bike zipline race challenge 90 feet above the ground. She also had a guest role in Lilet Matias: Attorney-at-Law and Forever Young.

In 2025, Martinez was selected as a housemate in the reality show Pinoy Big Brother: Celebrity Collab Edition, a joint project between GMA Network and ABS-CBN Studios. She represented her hometown with the moniker, "Ang Miss Sunuring Daughter ng Cebu City" and finished as one of the season's finalists alongside her duo-partner, River Joseph. She was named the Kapuso Fourth Big Placer in her edition. Later that year, Martinez appeared on an episode of Rainbow Rumble on Kapamilya Channel, A2Z and All TV.

== Media presence ==
In 2024, Martinez was featured in Fair Magazine's online Beauty page, with a highlight in an article titled "Inner Siren Unleashed". Fashion designer Roy Erwin Tizon, who worked closely with Martinez by designing several of her outfits for Miss Summit International, described her as "caring, sweet, and sincere."

In 2025, Martinez was featured in RAWR Magazine as PBB Collab's "Rising Jewel". She was also featured in Metro Magazine alongside her fellow PBB Big Four placers. In an exclusive Metro feature titled, "AZ Martinez Discovers the Beauty of Being Truly Seen, Thanks to Pinoy Big Brother", Martinez's PBB stint was described as:

"From a writer's POV, AZ has one of the most beautiful, notable, and cinematic character arcs in this PBB edition. The irony in the well-defined narrative of her journey is that it's a reality show that did not fully depend on a script—it's as if the story wrote itself." (Metro Style, August 1, 2025)

During her 2025 fan meet, Martinez's fans symbolically named a star in her honor, a novelty gesture.

== Other ventures ==
=== Advocacy and philanthropy ===
Martinez was appointed Philippine Youth Ambassadress in 2023 by the Philippine Youth Organization. In her Instagram post, she expressed gratitude for the opportunity to represent the voice of the Filipino youth, describing the role as both a responsibility and a privilege that she is committed to upholding and embodying as a leader.

During her PBB stint, Martinez and her duo partner, Joseph, won a charity task that awarded ₱100,000 for donation. They chose the Cancer Treatment and Support Foundation Inc. as the beneficiary, dedicating the donation to their late fathers. She also joined a relief donation drive in Montalban, Rizal, to aid residents affected by Severe Tropical Storm Crising, Typhoons Dante and Emong, and the southwest monsoon (Habagat).

=== Endorsements ===
In 2025, Martinez was named brand ambassador for Skin Care Depot (SCD). CEO Gracee Angeles cited her beauty, authenticity, charm, and confidence as reasons for the endorsement. Martinez is also the brand ambassador for beauty products KSerene, Manic Beauty, and Vida Nutriscience's SnowCaps. She is also one of the celebrity ambassadors for the 2025 Noel Bazaar Kick-Off.

== Filmography ==
Key
†	Denotes TV productions that have not yet been released

Film
Year	Title	Role	Notes	Ref.
2025	Opposites Almost Attract	Lead	Short online film	

=== Television ===
Year	Title	Role	Notes	Ref.
2022–2023	Mano Po Legacy: The Flower Sisters	Jessica Tang	Recurring role	
2023	Pepito Manaloto: Tuloy ang Kuwento	Nat	Guest role	
2023	Luv Is: Love at First Read	Gabriel	Guest role	
2023	The Missing Husband	Christine	Uncredited role	
2023	Regal Studio Presents: The Two Nerds	Angel	Episode role	
2024	Regal Studio Presents: Maid with Love	Mara	Episode role	
2024	Lilet Matias: Attorney-at-Law	Georgina	Guest role	
2024	Magpakailanman: Wanted: Sperm Donor	Anna	Episode role	
2024	Wish Ko Lang: Manugang Dinala sa Mental	Shiela	Episode role	
2024–2025	Forever Young	Zari	Uncredited role	
2025	Encantadia Chronicles: Sang'gre	Gladys	Guest role	
2025	Daig Kayo ng Lola Ko: Hotel De Luma	Mikki	Episode role	
2025	Daig Kayo ng Lola Ko: Beast Friends Forever	Mikki	Episode role	
2025	Regal Studio Presents: My Super Paranoid Girlfriend	Chelsea	Episode lead role	
2025	Sanggang Dikit FR	Santa Baby Sporty	Guest role	
2026	The Secrets of Hotel 88	Sari Garcia	Main Role	
2026	Love, Siargao	Lexi	Supporting role	
TBA	The Way Back to You †	Julia	Main role	

=== Reality and variety shows ===
Year	Title	Role	Notes	Ref.
2024	The Boobay and Tekla Show	Herself / Guest	Episode 250	
2024	Amazing Earth	Herself / Guest		
2025	Pinoy Big Brother: Celebrity Collab Edition	Herself / Housemate	Regular Housemate; Kapuso Fourth Big Placer	
2025	TiktoClock	Herself / Guest		
2025	It's Showtime	Herself / Guest	Episodes 213 and 225	
2025	Fast Talk with Boy Abunda	Herself / Guest	Episode 645	
2025	Family Feud	Herself / Contestant	Episode 788	
2025	Rainbow Rumble	Herself / Contestant	Season 2, Episode 10	
2025	Bubble Gang	Herself		
2025	All-Out Sundays	Herself		
2025	Unang Hirit	Host / Guest		
2025–2026	GMA Kapuso Countdown to 2026	Host / Guest		
2026	It's Showtime		February 7 Episode	
2026	Pinoy Big Brother: Celebrity Collab Edition 2.0	Herself / Houseguest	Day 108	

=== Music video appearances ===
Year	Title	Artist	Notes	Ref.
2025	"Naiilang"	Le John		

== Awards and nominations ==
=== The Village Pipol Choice Awards ===
Year	Notable Works	Category	Result	Ref.
2026	Herself	New Female TV Personality of the Year	Won	
2026	Herself	Sexiest Female of the Year (Second Place)	Won	

=== State and cultural honors ===
Name of country or organization, year given, and name of honor
Country or organization	Year	Honor	Ref.
TAG Media Chicago (Note: Organized by the Filipino-American community in Chicago, it selects its honorary inductees based on votes cast by the public via Patreon.)	2025	TAG 25 Under 25 (Note: It recognizes 25 prominent personalities, aged 25 and below, who have served as the "movers and shakers" of this generation.)	

=== Listicles ===
Name of publisher, year listed, name of listicle and placement
Publisher	Year	Listicle	Placement	Ref.
Inquirer	2026	Stars to watch out for in 2026	Included	
