= Mika Salamanca =

Filipino social media influencer

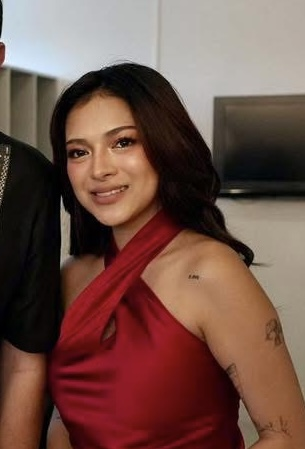
- Salamanca in 2025
- Born: Anne Michaella Salonga Salamanca; Pampanga, Philippines
- Education: St. Scholastica's College Manila
- Occupations: Vlogger; actress; singer; author
- Years active: 2023–present
- Agent: Sparkle
- Television: Pinoy Big Brother: Celebrity Collab Edition

YouTube information
- Channel: MikaSalamanca
- Subscribers: 4.62 million
- Views: 140 million views
- Last updated: August 4, 2025

Anne Michaella "Mika" Salonga Salamanca (Tagalog: [ˈmiːkə ˌsələˈmɑːŋkə]) is a Filipino social media influencer and television personality. She first gained public attention as a vlogger, sharing song covers and lifestyle videos on YouTube. Salamanca began her acting career with minor roles on GMA Network and is currently managed by Sparkle, the network's talent agency. In 2025, she was a housemate (contestant) on Pinoy Big Brother: Celebrity Collab Edition and won with her duo partner Brent Manalo.

== Early life ==
Anne Michaella Salonga Salamanca's mother is a homemaker and her father is a businessman. She completed her early education in her hometown before attending St. Scholastica's College in Manila. She graduated from high school in Alabama, United States.

== Career ==
In 2017, Salamanca was discovered for her singing abilities and gained widespread popularity through her rendition of the popular song "A Million Dreams", performed in a helium voice challenge. Following this, her career as a vlogger began to flourish.

In September 2023, she was introduced as an artist under Sparkle, the talent agency owned by GMA.

She appeared in supporting roles in several television series in 2023, including Sarah in Maging Sino Ka Man and Megan in Walang Matigas na Pulis sa Matinik na Misis. She also made a guest appearance on the comedy series Bubble Gang.

In 2025, Salamanca was revealed among the lineup of initial housemates (contestants) for Pinoy Big Brother: Celebrity Collab Edition. She eventually won the competition alongside Brent Manalo. She also made a guest appearance on the game show Rainbow Rumble on Kapamilya Channel, A2Z and All TV. In September, she published a children's book titled Lipad (lit. 'Flight').

== Philanthropy ==
Prior to her PBB stint, it was revealed that Salamanca regularly visited charities and had helped several young people complete their education. She also shared during a PBB task that she prioritizes helping the youth.

In 2025, Salamanca, together with her partner on the show, Brent Manalo, donated her entire Pinoy Big Brother cash prize of ₱1,000,000 (around US$17,450) to Duyan ni Maria, a Pampanga-based non-profit organization focused on providing education and support to underprivileged children. She expressed her strong belief in the value of education, stating that Duyan ni Maria ensures children under their care receive an education that will benefit them in the future.

The same year, Salamanca opened a donation drive to aid victims of Severe Tropical Storm Crising and the southwest monsoon. She volunteered in two soup kitchens to aid victims of the typhoons, working with the Angat Bayanihan Volunteer Network of the Angat Buhay Foundation. She donated to the Animal Kingdom Foundation's Barkyanihan Project, which supports the welfare of animals affected by natural disasters. She announced that 60% of the revenue generated from her YouTube video with Manalo, "1 Shot, 1 Cringe", would be donated to charity.

On September 8, 2025, she presented and introduced Lipad to the public, a book she wrote and intended to read during her charity visits. She revealed that it was originally meant to be a gift for the charities she would visit; however, her management encouraged her to sell the book, so that the proceeds could also go to charity.

During her book promotion, she visited a children's hospital and also led a book-reading session at the Book Nook Literacy Mission, where she read to and distributed copies of her book to 500 children.

On September 30, 2025, she collaborated with Aquaflask where all the proceeds from every purchase would go to her chosen charity.

On December 6, 2025, Salamanca held a reading session of Lipad for children battling acute lymphocytic leukemia.

== Controversies ==
=== COVID-19 quarantine ===
In July 2020, Salamanca was arrested in Hawaii for violating self-quarantine protocols during the COVID-19 pandemic. Reports indicated that she entered Hawaii on July 6 and was seen dining and socializing shortly thereafter. Following public criticism, she released a video apologizing for her actions and providing clarification on the incident.

== Personal life ==
Salamanca has several tattoos. In October 2025, she had some of her tattoos removed to conveniently continue her acting career without having to conceal them during principal photography. Salamanca said the removal was difficult because she has loved tattoos since she was a child, and each one has a personal meaning. However, she is open to getting tattooed again once she focuses on her music career.

== Filmography ==
=== Television ===
Year	Title	Role	Ref.
2023	Maging Sino Ka Man	Sarah	
2023	Bubble Gang	Herself / Guest	
2024	Abot-Kamay na Pangarap	Emerald Añonuevo	
2024	Walang Matigas na Pulis sa Matinik na Misis	Megan Espinosa	
2025	Pinoy Big Brother: Celebrity Collab Edition	Herself / Housemate	
2025	Encantadia Chronicles: Sang'gre	Anaca	
2025	It's Showtime	Herself / Guest / Judge	
2025	Rainbow Rumble	Herself / Contestant	
2026	Pinoy Big Brother: Celebrity Collab Edition 2.0	Herself / Houseguest	
2026	The Secrets of Hotel 88	Luna Almazan	
2026	Delivery Boi	Sheryl Samonte	

=== Film ===
Year	Title	Role	Note	Ref.
2025	Call Me Mother	Bea Santos	Supporting role, entry for the 51st Metro Manila Film Festival 2025	

== Discography ==
=== Singles ===
Year	Track	Details	Label
2018	"3 Am Song"	Debut single	
2020	"shut up"		
2021	"YOU"		
2025	Sino Nga Ba Siya		Star Music
2025	"What If Tayo?"	Duet with Brent Manalo	Star Music
2026	"Kasalanan"		Star Music

== Awards and nominations ==
Award ceremony	Year	Category	Result	Ref.
Anak TV Seal Awards	2025	Female Net Makabata Star	Won	
