= Charlie Fleming (actress) =

Filipino actress (born 2008)

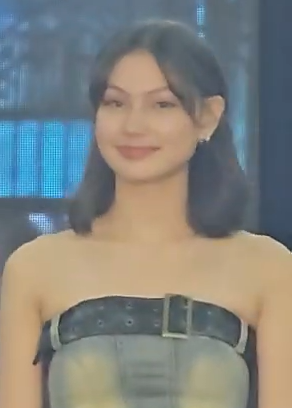
- Fleming in 2024
- Born: Charlie Anne Fleming; September 7, 2008 (age 17); Saudi Arabia
- Occupations: Actress; model
- Years active: 2021–present

Charlie Anne Fleming (born September 7, 2008) is a Filipino actress and model. She first became known as a housemate in Pinoy Big Brother: Celebrity Collab Edition in 2025.

Prior to her reality TV debut, Fleming has appeared in several television dramas and fashion events.

== Early life ==
Charlie Anne Fleming was born on September 7, 2008, in Saudi Arabia to a British father and a Filipino mother from Cagayan de Oro City. She was raised in Cagayan de Oro and speaks Cebuano fluently. At the age of 16, she assumed the role of breadwinner for her family.

== Career ==
Fleming was first discovered as a content creator on TikTok in 2021, which led to an audition opportunity with Sparkle, the talent management division of GMA Network. She was introduced as a part of Sparkle Teens in 2023.

In 2023, Fleming made her modeling debut, walking the runway at Bench Fashion Week, one of the Philippines' premier fashion events. She also participated in the Fashion Institute of the Philippines’ graduation show.

That same year, Fleming transitioned into acting, taking on supporting roles in several television dramas, including Pepito Manoloto and Black Rider. She is best known for her role as Sofia Trano in the 2023 series Royal Blood. She later earned a nomination for Best New Female TV Personality in the 37th PMPC Star Awards for Television for her portrayal. She reprised her role in the 2024 spin-off Widows' War, where her performance garnered significant attention.

In 2025, Fleming was introduced as one of the initial housemates for Pinoy Big Brother: Celebrity Collab Edition. Dubbed the "Bubbly Bread-Teener ng Cagayan de Oro", she was the youngest housemate of the season. Fleming was the second housemate to be evicted, exiting alongside her duo partner, Kira Balinger. She later returned to the show as an official housemate, re-entering the house with Ralph de Leon after winning the season's wildcard twist. She later participated as an contestant on Rainbow Rumble on Kapamilya Channel, A2Z and All TV.

== Filmography ==
=== Film ===
Year	Title	Role	Ref.
2026	Huwag Kang Titingin	Tanya	

=== Television ===
Year	Title	Role	Ref.
2023–25	Family Feud	Herself/Guest Player	
2023–25	TiktoClock	Herself/Guest	
2023	Pepito Manaloto: Tuloy ang Kuwento	Hazel Morales	
2023	Black Rider	Sophia Lagdameo	
2023	Royal Blood	Sofia Trano	
2024–2025	Widows' War	Sofia Trano	
2024	The Clash	Herself/Video Greeting	
2024	Magpakailanman: Ang Banta ng Duwende	Lesley	
2025	Magpakailanman: Ang Inang Iniwan	Queenie	
2025	Sparkle Campus Cutie	Herself	
2025	Fast Talk with Boy Abunda	Herself/Guest	
2025	Regal Studio Presents: My Stage Mom	Alice	
2025	Pinoy Big Brother: Celebrity Collab Edition	Herself/Housemate	
2025	Rainbow Rumble	Herself/Contestant	
2026	The Secrets of Hotel 88	Maria	
2026	The Master Cutter	Karla Samonte	

== Awards and nominations ==
Year	Award ceremony	Category	Nominated work	Results	Ref.
2025	37th PMPC Star Awards for Television	Best New Female TV Personality	Royal Blood	Nominated	
