= Ralph de Leon =

Filipino actor and television personality (born 2000)

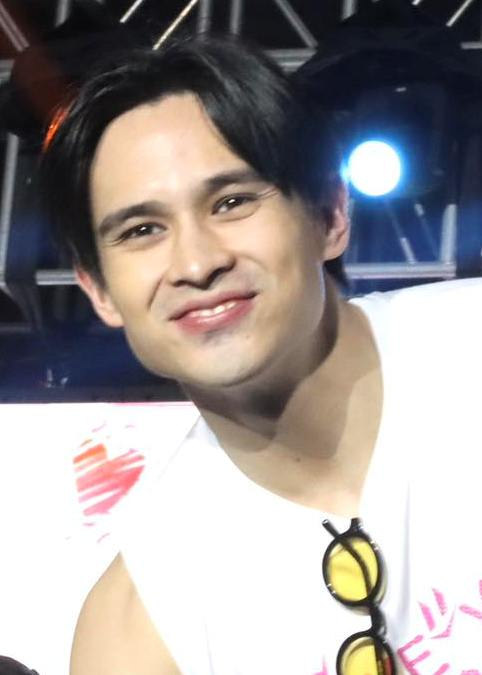
- De Leon in 2025
- Born: Rafael August Arayata de Leon; August 30, 2000 (age 26); Tanza, Cavite, Philippines
- Education: Ateneo de Manila University (BS in Management Engineering)
- Occupations: Actor, model, host, athlete
- Years active: 2024–present
- Agent: Star Magic (2024–present)
- Known for: High Street; Pinoy Big Brother: Celebrity Collab Edition
- Height: 176 cm (5 ft 9 in)
- Relatives: Jake Cuenca (cousin)

Rafael August Arayata de Leon (born August 30, 2000), known popularly as Ralph de Leon, is a Filipino actor, model, and judoka. He is known for his role as Dr. Kevin Gonzales in the drama-mystery series High Street (2024) and as a housemate in Pinoy Big Brother: Celebrity Collab Edition (2025).

== Early life ==
Ralph de Leon was born on August 30, 2000, in Tanza, Cavite, Philippines. His maternal side is linked with politics, specifically in Tanza, Cavite. De Leon's grandfather, Ashley Arayata, served as Tanza’s municipal mayor from 2007 to 2016, while some relatives were board members. However, the Arayatas are no longer active in politics. De Leon also expressed his and his cousins’ disinterest in the field.

In his school years in Ateneo High School, De Leon was a consistent honor student. Alongside his academic endeavors, he also pursued Judo as his competitive sport, wherein he would serve as co-captain of the high school's judo team. From 2018 to 2022, De Leon attended Ateneo de Manila University (ADMU) under the program of Bachelor of Science in Management Engineering. He chose the program due to its business nature and as a precursor to his childhood dream of being a lawyer—of which he did not continue to pursue. During this time, De Leon admitted to be running for latin honors, but later got demotivated due to the COVID-19 lockdown. De Leon was also part of ADMU's judo team, in which he served as the team captain for some time.

He developed an early interest in music and learned to play the piano as a child. His father, a photographer and videographer, introduced him to cameras at an early age, in which De Leon developed a strong interest in being in front of the camera.

== Athletic career ==
De Leon began practicing judo around the age of 12 through the encouragement of his cousin who was part of the Ateneo High School Judo Team. He, then, competed in multiple judo tournaments throughout his school years, earning multiple medals and later serving as co-captain of the said team.

In his collegiate years, De Leon joined the Ateneo Judo Team, serving as their team captain for some time. He also took part of competitions, including the University Athletic Association of the Philippines (UAAP), winning multiple recognitions and medals. In 2018, De Leon took home a gold medal in the UAAP judo tournament -73 kg division. On the next year, he took home a silver for the same division.

== Media career ==
=== Early career ===
De Leon began modeling in high school, participating in school fairs and small brand projects for friends. This later led to professional test shoots and early work in commercial acting. He worked on several TVCs, including Mcdonalds and Lactezin. De Leon was also featured in magazines such as Parcinq and Garage.

In 2022, he marked his first runway at Bench Fashion Week. The next year, De Leon also walked for designer Ehrran Montoya's Spora Summer / Spring 2024 collection.

De Leon also hosted events such as Mister Pilipinas Worldwide 2023 and Miss Universe Philippines 2023 and 2024.

=== Mainstream career ===
In 2024, De Leon participated in a mini-reality audition series Zoomers: The Search For The Next Gen Z Star. He originally auditioned for the lead role Jiggs, in which he was considered for despite being a newcomer. He eventually lands to role of Atom, a charismatic and accomplished student leader. De Leon said this to be fitting for his real life personality. He, then, made his onscreen debut with the digital drama series Zoomers on the same year alongside Harvey Bautista, Criza Taa, Krystal Ball, and Luke Alford. His acting breakthrough came the same year with his portrayal of Dr. Kevin Gonzales in the drama-mystery series High Street, which aired on Kapamilya Channel and streamed on iWantTFC. Gonzales was partner to Xyriel Manabat's character Roxy and rival to Elijah Canlas' character Archie. Both of his acting performance were well-received.

In August 2024, he, alongside his High Street co-stars AC Bonifacio, Gela Atayde, Harvey Bautista, and Tommy Alejandrino, appeared on the game show Rainbow Rumble. He secured a total prize of ₱82,000 during his appearance, with ₱62,000 earned from the main game and an additional ₱20,000 from the "Rainbow Reveal" round.

In 2025, he joined the reality show Pinoy Big Brother (PBB): Celebrity Collab Edition as a housemate with the moniker "Dutiful Judo-son ng Cavite". During his stay, De Leon was nominated for three consecutive weeks with duos Michael Sager, AZ Martinez, and Dustin Yu, until he was evicted on day 63 with duo Josh Ford. Just a week of being evicted, on day 71, he returned to the PBB house alongside Kapuso housemate Charlie Fleming after a landslide win on the wildcard twist. After his comeback, De Leon ranked first in all solo tasks, which gave him eviction immunity and the advantage of choosing his final duo. He, then, became final duos with Kapuso housemate Will Ashley under the duo-name RaWi. Through a big jump challenge, RaWi became the second duo to be part of the big four, and later became the second big placer of the edition.

After his PBB stint, De Leon received multiple endorsements and partnerships, including Mang Inasal, Acer, Penshoppe, UFC Fun Chow, Ponds, Pepsi, Selecta, OJ Philippines, Breeze, Axe, and National Bookstore, and graced magazines such as Metro, Allure, VMAN Sea, and Scout Magazine, alongside fellow PBB housemates. De Leon landed acting gigs in music videos, including Le John's "Naiilang" with AZ Martinez and Sofronio Vasquez's "Patient" with Xyriel Manabat. He also made his big screen for Metro Manila Film Festival debut with Love You So Bad (2025), portraying Phillip "Phil" Tristan Perez, student government vice president and best friend to PBB final duo Will Ashley's character.

De Leon is set to make his TV return in 2026 as one of the cast members of upcoming mystery-adventure series The Secrets of Hotel 88, alongside fellow PBB alumni Mika Salamanca, Brent Manalo, Will Ashley, Esnyr Ranollo, AZ Martinez, River Joseph, Bianca de Vera, Dustin Yu, Klarisse de Guzman, Josh Ford, and Kira Balinger.

And in May 2026, De Leon became one of the hosts of the revived version of Y Speak, named Y Speak 2.0, alongside with River Joseph, Elijah Canlas, Aya Fernandez, KD Estrada, and Robbie Jaworski

== Filmography ==
=== Television ===
==== Drama series ====
Year	Title	Role	Notes	Ref.
2024	Zoomers - Season 1	Atom Andrada	Main Role	
2024	Zoomers - Season 2	Atom Andrada	Main Role	
2024	High Street	Dr. Kevin Gonzales	Main Role	
2026	The Secrets of Hotel 88	Martin Madrigal	Main Role	
2026	The Way Back to You	Tristan	Main Role	

==== Reality and variety shows ====
Year	Title	Role	Notes	Ref.
2024	Rainbow Rumble	Himself / Contestant	Guest appearance; Season 1, Episode 14	
2024	Zoomers: The Search for the Next Gen Z Stars	Himself	Contestant	
2024	Kapamilya Chat	Himself	Guest appearance	
2025	Pinoy Big Brother: Celebrity Collab Edition	Himself / Housemate	Regular Housemate (Day 63); Wild Card (Day 71); Kapamilya Second Big Placer	
2025	It's Showtime	Himself / Guest Hurado		
2026	Pinoy Big Brother: Celebrity Collab Edition 2.0	Himself / Houseguest	Day 108	
2026	Y Speak 2.0	Himself / Host		

=== Film ===
Year	Title	Role	Ref.
2025	Love You So Bad	Phil	

=== Music video appearances ===
Year	Song	Artist	Ref.
2025	"Naiilang"	Le John	
2025	"Patient"	Sofronio Vasquez	

== Awards and nominations ==
=== The Village Pipol Choice Awards ===
Year	Notable Works	Category	Result	Ref.
2026	Himself	New Male TV Personality of the Year	Won	
