= Pinoy Big Brother: Celebrity Collab Edition =

Season of a Philippine television reality show

- Season 3
- Title card
- Hosted by: Bianca Gonzalez; Robi Domingo; Kim Chiu; Melai Cantiveros; Enchong Dee; Alexa Ilacad; Gabbi Garcia; Mavy Legaspi
- No. of days: 119
- No. of housemates: 20
- Winners: Brent Manalo; Mika Salamanca
- Runners-up: Ralph de Leon; Will Ashley
- Companion shows: Updates; The OnlineVerse
- No. of episodes: 111

Release
- Original network: GMA Network (Note: The show also aired on Kapamilya Online Live, and TFC. It was also streamed on-demand via iWantTFC (now iWant).)
- Original release: March 9 – July 5, 2025

Season chronology
- ← Previous; Celebrity Edition 2 Next → Celebrity Collab Edition 2.0

External videos
- Pinoy Big Brother: Celebrity Collab Edition | Full Episodes

The third season of the reality game show Pinoy Big Brother: Celebrity Edition, subtitled Collab, stylized as Celebrity Collab Edition, aired on GMA Network for 119 days from March 9 to July 5, 2025.

This season featured celebrities from the talent agencies Star Magic and Sparkle GMA Artist Center competing as duos, a first in the series. As part of a collaboration between ABS-CBN Studios, the franchise holder, and GMA Network, the season was the first to air on the latter channel. The show was presented by a roster of hosts led by Bianca Gonzalez, including new hosts Gabbi Garcia and Mavy Legaspi.

After 119 days, Brent Manalo and Mika Salamanca were named the winners at the finale held at the New Frontier Theater, with Ralph De Leon and Will Ashley as first runners-up. Celebrity Collab Edition was the longest non-regular season of the franchise, surpassing Teen Edition 4 by 28 days, until it was surpassed by the succeeding season by eight days.

== Development ==
On January 27, 2025, during a broadcast of the newscast 24 Oras, actress-presenter Iya Villania announced that the new season of Pinoy Big Brother would air on GMA Network, marking the franchise's debut broadcast on the network. As series' third celebrity edition, subtitled Celebrity Collab Edition, the season's cast would be composed of artists from the talent agencies Star Magic and Sparkle GMA Artist Center. The following day, a contract signing between the executives from ABS-CBN Studios and GMA Network was held in Quezon City. Principal photography commenced on March 9, 2025.

Hosts from the previous seasons—Bianca Gonzalez, Robi Domingo, Kim Chiu, Melai Cantiveros, Enchong Dee and Alexa Ilacad—all reprised their roles. Two talents from GMA—Gabbi Garcia and Mavy Legaspi—joined the roster of hosts on February 9 and 21, respectively.

=== Broadcast ===
The season premiered on March 9, 2025, on GMA's Sunday night lineup. The program aired on GMA Network's Prime lineup during weeknights and on weekend nights. The show aired worldwide via GMA Pinoy TV and The Filipino Channel. Aside from its television broadcast, the season also airs online through Kapuso Stream, Kapamilya Online Live, iWant, and ABS-CBN Entertainment YouTube channel. Two companions show support the series. Updates, hosted by Garcia, airs twice on weekdays on GMA, while The OnlineVerse, hosted by Ilacad and Legaspi, streaming every Saturdays on Kapuso Stream and Kapamilya Online Live.

=== Theme songs ===
The season used a new version of "Sikat Ang Pinoy" (transl. Filipinos Are Famous) as its main theme, with Darren Espanto and Julie Anne San Jose providing vocals for the track. Jonathan Manalo composed and produced the season's eviction theme, "Paalam Muna Sandali" (transl. Goodbye for a Moment), which was recorded and released by Espanto as a single off his upcoming album Ikaw Pa Rin (2025).

=== Broadcast coverage in other programs ===
During the season, the Big Brother House welcomed prominent news personalities for special interviews. Veteran broadcast journalist Rico Hizon conducted an exclusive interview with Kuya in late June 2025 as part of his program, Beyond the Exchange with Rico Hizon, which aired on the ABS-CBN News Channel. His interview delved into various aspects of the show, including the selection criteria for prospective housemates and the intent behind the house tasks.

Meanwhile, days before the Big Night, GMA Network journalist Jessica Soho visited the house to interview the season's finalists. Her interview covered the housemates' experiences inside the house, and was broadcast a day after the Big Night on her top-rating weekly magazine program, Kapuso Mo, Jessica Soho. During her visit, Soho immersed herself in the landmark aspects of the show, including meeting Kuya in the confession room, learning about the house rules, and touring the house. She also cooked for the housemates, and they shared lessons learned about being true to oneself and the importance of community.

== Format ==
=== Collab format ===
The season's subtitle, Collab, alludes to its cast, which is composed of celebrities signed to the talent agencies Star Magic and Sparkle GMA Artist Center, a first in Pinoy Big Brother history. Deviating from the show's usual format, the housemates competed in duos, each consisting of a Star Magic and Sparkle housemate. These duos were shuffled periodically through tasks and challenges until Day 91, when the final duos were determined. In each nomination round, each duo nominates two other duos for eviction, with the first receiving three points and the second receiving one point. The top three duos with the most nomination points (or more if there is a tie) will be put forward for public vote. Housemates are nominated and evicted as duos, with a duo being declared as the winner in the season finale. For the first time since the show's inaugural season in 2005, nominations and evictions were conducted every two weeks.

==== Maya partnership ====
Digital payment app Maya retained its partnership with Pinoy Big Brother, as its official finance and voting partner. Through the app, viewers may vote to save a nominee from eviction, being provided 30 chances to vote per voting day. Starting from the fourth nomination round, viewers have the additional option to give 300 or 500 save votes to a nominated housemate of their choice.

For The Big Night, viewers can vote to save and evict. Furthermore, viewers can vote unlimited times.

As part of their sponsorship, housemates can manage their weekly budget by depositing their funds in the app. If they succeed in their weekly task, they will receive ₱50,000; otherwise, they will receive the interest that their amount have which is 15%. Housemates have two options: they can spend a portion of their weekly budget for the week or save it and allow it to grow with an interest rate of up to 20%.

=== Twists ===
- Immunity Shield: First unveiled on Day 9, the Immunity Shield necklace grants the wearer immunity for the following nomination round.
- The Big Comeback: On Day 64, the hosts announced that there will be a Wild Card Round for the evicted housemates, with an exception to Michael and Emilio due to their prior commitments, using Maya, where viewers will have the power to vote to bring back one Sparkle housemate and one Star Magic housemate who deserve to continue his/her journey inside the house. The results were announced on Day 71. The voting process was conducted individually and daily voting limit will also apply.
- Big Intensity Challenges: On Day 72, Big Brother announced that the housemates would determine the final duo through a series of challenges, aside from immunity at stake. The Sparkle housemates faced off against fellow Sparkle housemates, while the Star Magic housemates faced off against fellow Star Magic housemates. The nominees for the fifth nomination round were determined through this challenge, with one Sparkle and Star Magic housemate being evicted at the end of the week.
- Secret Room: On Day 79, Big Brother surprised the other housemates by isolating the four Big Intensity Challenge winners, AZ, Esnyr, Shuvee, and Ralph, in a secret room. After a set amount of time, these four housemates switched rooms with the nominated housemates. During their stay in the Secret Room, they were able to communicate with a morphed voice of Big Brother via a "Secret Confession Room." The housemates were given a limited budget of ₱1,000, which was later increased by the Money Roll task done outside the Secret Room. To free the nominated housemates from the Secret Room, the saved housemates must work together on a task with the assistance of houseguest Jane de Leon.
- House Challenges: The housemates and duo challengers faced a series of challenges that may or may not have an impact on who stays and who leaves the house, and those housemates who faced the challenges risked losing their housemate status to them. The duo challengers entered the house on Day 99, stayed in the task room, and observed the housemates secretly. One by one, evicted duos faced the housemates, putting them in situations that would reveal their true colors. In the end, the duo challengers voted on which final duo deserves to be in the Big 4. Unbeknownst to the final duos, they were also given a chance to vote. The final duo that receives the most votes will claim the first spot in the Big 4. A challenge will be held to break the tie, if any.
- Big Jump to the Big Four: Last used on Connect as Big 4 Karapatdapat Challenges, on Day 107, shortly after Charlie and Esnyr were declared as the first duo to enter the Big 4, Big Brother announced that the remaining four duos would undergo three distinct Big Jump challenges to determine the remaining three slots in the Big 4.
- One Million Votes Challenge: Similar to the Ten Million Diamonds Challenge used in Kumunity 10, the four remaining duos will face a series of challenges to earn a portion of the one million votes at stake, which will be combined with the public's votes in the finale.

== Housemates ==
The cast of Pinoy Big Brother: Celebrity Collab Edition. Upper half: Dustin, AZ, Josh, Charlie, Michael, Esnyr, Klarisse, River, Kira, Brent Middle: Shuvee, Xyriel Lower half: Mika, Vince, Ashley, Will, Bianca, Ralph, AC, Emilio

On Day 1 (March 9), fifteen celebrity housemates entered the house alongside houseguest Ivana Alawi. The first seven to enter were artists from Sparkle, followed by seven artists from Star Magic. Sparkle artist Michael Sager was the last one to enter that night. On Day 10 (March 18), Star Magic artist Bianca de Vera entered the house following Alawi's exit.

On Day 22 (March 30), Emilio Daez of Star Magic and Vince Maristela of Sparkle entered the house, followed by Xyriel Manabat of Star Magic and Shuvee Etrata of Sparkle on Day 36 (April 13), who became the final entrants for the season.

A total of twenty people entered the house, ten each from two agencies, the largest number of housemates in a celebrity edition of Pinoy Big Brother.

Pinoy Big Brother: Celebrity Collab Edition housemates
Name	Age on entry	Hometown	Agency	Occupation	Day entered	Day exited	Status	Ref.
Brent Manalo	27	Tarlac	Star Magic	Actor	Day 1	Day 119	Winner	
Mika Salamanca	24	Pampanga	Sparkle	Actress and content creator	Day 1	Day 119	Winner	
Ralph de Leon	24	Cavite	Star Magic	Actor and judoka	Day 71	Day 119	Runner-up	
Ralph de Leon	24	Cavite	Star Magic	Actor and judoka	Day 1	Day 63	Evicted	
Will Ashley	22	Cavite	Sparkle	Actor	Day 1	Day 119	Runner-up	
Charlie Fleming	16	Cagayan de Oro	Sparkle	Actress	Day 71	Day 119	3rd place	
Charlie Fleming	16	Cagayan de Oro	Sparkle	Actress	Day 1	Day 35	Evicted	
Esnyr	23	Davao del Sur	Star Magic	Actor and content creator	Day 1	Day 119	3rd place	
AZ Martinez	22	Cebu	Sparkle	Actress and beauty queen	Day 1	Day 119	4th place	
River Joseph	26	Muntinlupa	Star Magic	Actor	Day 1	Day 119	4th place	
Bianca de Vera	23	Taguig	Star Magic	Actress and influencer	Day 10	Day 112	Evicted	
Dustin Yu	23	Quezon City	Sparkle	Actor and businessman	Day 1	Day 112	Evicted	
Klarisse de Guzman	33	Rizal	Star Magic	Singer	Day 1	Day 98	Evicted	
Shuvee Etrata	23	Cebu	Sparkle	Actress	Day 36	Day 98	Evicted	
Xyriel Manabat	21	Rizal	Star Magic	Actress	Day 36	Day 84	Evicted	
Vince Maristela	25	Rizal	Sparkle	Actor	Day 22	Day 84	Evicted	
Josh Ford	21	United Kingdom	Sparkle	Actor	Day 1	Day 63	Evicted	
Emilio Daez	25	Pasig	Star Magic	Actor	Day 22	Day 49	Evicted	
Michael Sager	22	Marinduque	Sparkle	Actor	Day 1	Day 49	Evicted	
Kira Balinger	24	Cavite	Star Magic	Actress	Day 1	Day 35	Evicted	
AC Bonifacio	22	Canada	Star Magic	Actress and TV personality	Day 1	Day 21	Evicted	
Ashley Ortega	26	San Juan	Sparkle	Actress and figure skater	Day 1	Day 21	Evicted	

== Houseguests ==
Within the framework of Pinoy Big Brother, the term "houseguest" designates an individual invited to enter the Big Brother house. Some of these houseguests are introduced with the explicit purpose of residing for an extended duration and deliberately chosen to influence the dynamics among the official housemates—thereby affecting relationships or altering the competition's trajectory. Conversely, other houseguests serve primarily as visitors; their stay within the house is typically brief, often entailing specific tasks assigned by Big Brother, or their presence fulfills a particular purpose. This can include, for instance, introducing a new game twist, presenting a unique challenge to the housemates, providing gifts to the housemates, or engaging them in conversation.

For this season, the following individuals entered as houseguests:

- Ivana Alawi (Day 1–7)
- Mavy Legaspi (Day 1–5)
- Gabbi Garcia (Day 1; Day 14–17)
- Melai Cantiveros and Alexa Ilacad (Day 1)
- Kim Chiu and Paulo Avelino (Day 19)
- Michelle Dee (Day 21–24)
- Sanya Lopez (Day 28)
- Ji Soo (Day 30–32)
- Jhoanna and Stacey of Bini (Day 39–42)
- Donny Pangilinan (Day 50–53)
- David Licauco (Day 57–62)
- Dingdong Dantes and Charo Santos-Concio (Day 66)
- Bianca Umali (Day 78–80)
- Jane de Leon (Day 80–84)
- Heart Evangelista (Day 92)
- Barbie Forteza (Day 94)
- Gerald Anderson (Day 95)
- Maris Racal (Day 98)
- Charlie's mother Flong Fleming and Esnyr's father Marcelino Ranollo, Jr. (Day 108)
- Will's mother Mindy de Leon and Ralph's father Raffy de Leon (Day 109)
- River's mother Ida Joseph and AZ's mother Bing Coloma (Day 110)
- Dustin's father Peter Yu, Bianca's mother Aileen Dimapilis, Brent's mother Mariel Manalo, and Mika's mother Bambie Salamanca (Day 111).
- Vice Ganda (Day 111)
- Boy Abunda (Day 113)
- Jessica Soho (Day 117)

== Tasks ==
=== Weekly tasks ===
Pinoy Big Brother: Celebrity Collab Edition weekly tasks
No.	Date & day assigned	Task title and description	Result
1	March 11 (Day 3)	**Twinkle Twinkle Big Star**; Housemates and houseguests (in duos) must use two giant batteries to light a "big star" by placing them at the correct contact points. They can make no more than eight mistakes. If a duo makes a mistake, they are disqualified from the task. If the housemates complete the task in the final 60 minutes, Big Brother will donate ₱60,000.00 (US$1,045) to charity.	Passed
2	March 19 (Day 11)	**One-shot Wonder**; The housemates must create a seamless one-shot film featuring Esnyr's nine characters in various scenes and locations. To win, the film must be between 18 and 18:59 minutes long without mistakes.	Failed (Note: Although the video's length (18 minutes and 25 seconds) was within the time limit, the housemates committed three mistakes. These include the reflection of housemates not involved in the current scene, or of the cameraman being seen in the mirror, and a housemate being captured in a different scene.)
3	March 22 (Day 14)	**Pinoy Big Pares**; The housemates must prepare, cook, and sell pares and tokwa't baboy from 3:00 pm to 8:00 pm on March 27 and 28. To win, they must double their ₱20,000 (US$350) investment. Pinoy Big Pares weekly task result: Investment / Target sales / Total sales; ₱23,098.00 (Note: On the second day, the task leaders requested more stocks since their supplies were running low. These stocks are worth ₱3,098.00 (US$54). Therefore, the total investment to be doubled by the housemates is ₱23,098.00 (US$403).) (US$403) / ₱46,196.00 (US$807) / **₱82,987.00** **(US$1,446)**	Passed
4	March 31 (Day 23)	**Rampa Apmar**; Housemates had to walk backward (rampa) down a narrow runway (apmar) during a fashion show. Each designed and modeled two outfits: a cloak representing misconceptions about them and innerwear revealing their true selves. They could make no more than five mistakes. (Note: Big Brother clarified that all mistakes made by a single housemate will be treated as one mistake for the weekly task.)	Failed (Note: Except for Josh, Michael, and Will, all of the housemates committed a mistake, leading to a total of 13 mistakes, with everyone from the second group committing a mistake.)
5	April 8 (Day 31)	**Twin Towers of Love**; The housemates, divided into two groups, must stack a 5-foot tower of cups on a suspended platform with a half-heart base. They must carry the platforms to the middle of the pool and join them to form a heart. To win, they must complete this within 100 minutes, and the heart must stay intact for 10 seconds. (Note: Since Ji-Soo was able to deliver three hugot lines for the P-drama task, the housemates were able to remove a total of three layers across both towers.)	Passed
6	April 14 (Day 37)	**When You Say Nothing at All**; For Holy Week, housemates had 20 hours to speak, with only one group (male or female) allowed to speak at a time. A traffic light system controls speaking: red means males can't speak, yellow means females can't speak, and green means both can't speak. An hour is deducted for each mistake.	Failed (Note: On the final day, the housemates had less than two hours to speak. However, they committed a whopping twenty-one mistakes, dooming them to their third failed weekly task.)
7	April 24 (Day 47)	**Flip or Flop**; The nominated duos must flip bottles upright with the housemates' help: Emilio and Michael (5), Dustin and Ralph (5), and Brent and Vince (13). Only one duo flips at a time, and any fallen bottle is deducted. Flipping 12 bottles by the third day earns 50% of the weekly budget, while flipping all 23 bottles earns the full budget. (Note: By the third day, the housemates were able to reach the 12-bottle mark, temporarily guaranteeing them 50% of the weekly budget. However, Big Brother made an offer to the task leaders, Emilio and Vince. Should they opt to try getting the full weekly budget, they only need to flip the remaining 11 bottles. However, only the three nominated duos can do this. Furthermore, failing to flip all 11 bottles means no weekly budget. The task leaders decided to proceed with the task. Emilio and Michael flipped 11 bottles, handing them the victory for this weekly task and the full weekly budget.)	Passed
8	April 27 (Day 50)	**Shoot Para Sa Sulat (Shoot for the Letters)**; Housemates are divided into two groups based on basketball skill: starters, who use mini-sized equipment, and bench players, who use regular-sized equipment. To win, they must score 1,779 baskets (70% of 2,541 total words in their letters). To open each letter, they must score points equal to the number of words in it. Groups: Starters: Donny, Dustin, Josh, Klarisse, Ralph, River, Vince, and Will; **Bench** : AZ, Bianca, Brent, Esnyr, Mika, Shuvee, and Xyriel; Scores of the Starters: Housemate / Words Per Letter / Result; Dustin / 141 / Passed; Josh / 147 / Passed; Klarisse / 200 / Passed; Ralph / 194 / Passed; River / 200 / Passed; Vince / 188 / Passed; Will / 168 / Passed; Scores of the Bench: Housemate / Words Per Letter / Result; AZ / 156 / Passed; Bianca / 199 / Passed; Brent / 197 / Passed; Esnyr / 169 / Passed; Mika / 193 / Passed; Shuvee / 195 / Passed; Xyriel / 194 / Passed; Shoot para sa Sulat weekly task result: Scores / Words Per Letter / Result; Total Score / 2,541 / 14/14; Target Score / 1,779 / 14/14; Total number of words / 2,541 / 14/14	Passed
9	May 5 (Day 58)	**Picture with Feelings**; The nominated housemates must take three photos capturing real, raw emotions: disgust, crying with tears, and annoyance/anger. These emotions must be genuine, not acted. The safe housemates cannot know about the secret task. To cover it up, the nominated duos created a fitness-related decoy weekly task. Picture with Feelings weekly task result: Emotion / Housemate / Result; Disgust / Esnyr / Passed; Crying with tears / Mika / Passed; Annoyance/Anger / River / Passed	Passed
10	May 11 (Day 64)	**The Big Carnival Concert**; The housemates must perform seven production numbers for two live shows (Days 70–71). Three of these are circus acts, performed by two duos each. Each circus act is worth one-third of the weekly budget. To win, at least one duo in each act must complete their performance without any mistakes in the first show (Day 70). (Note: Fifty people from the outside world who secured tickets on a first-come, first-served basis by paying ₱20,000 will enter the house to attend The Big Carnival Concert. The ticket package includes a photo opportunity with the housemates, confession room experience, signed housemate t-shirt, food and drinks, photo opportunities at the house facade, and main lobby. The earned ticket sales will proceed to the PBB Collab Charity Mission.) The Big Carnival Concert weekly task result (First show): Act / Duo 1 / Duo 2 / Result; Juggling / Mika & Xyriel / Dustin & River / Passed; Flower Stick (Note: Bianca was unable to participate in the show because of an ankle injury sustained during rehearsals. Instead, she became the concert's emcee.) / Bianca & Will / Esnyr & Shuvee / Failed; Spin Disc / AZ & Brent / Klarisse & Vince / Passed; The Big Carnival Concert weekly task result (Second show): Act / Duo 1 / Duo 2 / Result; Juggling / Mika & Xyriel / Dustin & River / Failed; Flower Stick / Bianca & Will / Esnyr & Shuvee / Passed; Spin Disc / AZ & Brent / Klarisse & Vince / Passed	Passed (Note: The housemates received 2/3 of the weekly budget on the first show after they passed 2 out of 3 circus acts. With 2 more acts passing at the second show, the housemates received 133% of the weekly budget.)
11	May 18 (Day 71)	**The Big Taguan (The Big Hiding)**; The male housemates (Note: As an additional reward for winning the first Big Intensity Challenge, Shuvee was informed about the male housemates' secret weekly task. This meant that she was allowed to help the boys for the rest of the task.) must hide two items marked with red ribbons from the female housemates for the entire week. These "items" are revealed to be the returning Star Magic housemate Ralph and the Sparkle housemate Charlie. Half of the weekly budget is at stake for each "item.”	Passed (Note: The housemates received 50% of the weekly budget after the male housemates successfully hid Ralph for the entire week.)
12	May 29 (Day 82)	**Balik-Bahay (Back-Home)**; The immune housemates, along with houseguest Jane, must stack a tower of cups as tall as the height of the housemate they wish to bring back. They must then place a "housemate figure" on top and carry the tower past a miniature PBB House, ensuring the figure passes through the door. To win, they must bring back all ten nominated housemates. (Note: When only one housemate was left, Big Brother forced the four most recent returnees to do the task and carry one handle each. They failed to bring back Dustin in thirty minutes.) Balik-Bahay weekly task result among Sparkle housemates: Housemate / Height / Result; Charlie / 5' 7" / Passed; Dustin / 5' 8.5" / Failed; Mika / 5' / Passed; Vince / 5' 11" / Passed; Will / 5' 7.5" / Passed; Balik-Bahay weekly task result among Star Magic housemates: Housemate / Height / Result; Bianca / 5' 0" / Passed; Brent / 5' 10" / Passed; Klarisse / 5' 2" / Passed; River / 5' 11" / Passed; Xyriel / 4' 9" / Passed	Failed
13	June 4 (Day 88)	**SSS: Sayaw Sa Sahig (Dance on the Floor)**; Each housemate must design a logo that represents them. They must then create a floor choreography incorporating six of the logos' shapes.	Passed
14	June 11 (Day 95)	**Sa Mata ng Pag-tulong (On the Eye of Help)**; The housemates must guide 100 ping pong balls through six rings using rackets into a box. Duos take turns, and rankings are based on the number of successful balls. Prize money is awarded to their chosen charities based on their final rankings. Sa Mata ng Pag-tulong weekly task result: Duo / Charity / Number of balls collected / Prize; AZ & River / Cancer Treatment and Support Foundation, Inc. / 9 / ₱35,000.00; Bianca & Dustin / Animal Kingdom Foundation / 29 / ₱100,000.00; Brent & Mika / Duyan ni Maria Children's Home / 1 / ₱25,000.00; Charlie & Esnyr / Chosen Children Village Foundation / 13 / ₱60,000.00; Klarisse & Shuvee / Angat Buhay / 5 / ₱30,000.00; Ralph & Will / Fr. Al's Children Foundation, Inc. / 43 / ₱150,000.00	Passed
15	June 15 (Day 99)	**D.C.** The housemates and Duo Challengers face off in a challenge that tests strategy and determination. The goal is to knock off the balls from the opposing group, with each player having three lives. To pass the task, the housemates must win all five matches. **Matchups** (bold text indicates the match winner): **Brent & Mika** vs. AC & Ashley; **AZ & River** vs. Josh & Kira; **Bianca & Dustin** vs. Vince & Xyriel; **Charlie & Esnyr** vs. Emilio & Michael; **Ralph & Will** vs. Klarisse & Shuvee	Passed
16	June 24 (Day 108)	**The Road to the Big Night**; The housemates must bring a ball up a board filled with photos from their journey using a platform attached to a rope, with each duo member pulling one end. If the ball falls into the wrong hole or goes beyond the red marks, they must restart. To succeed, each duo must shoot five balls into the hole at the center of the PBB logo at the top of the board. The Road to the Big Night weekly task result: Duo / Balls; AZ & River / 5; Bianca & Dustin / 5; Brent & Mika / 5; Charlie & Esnyr / 5; Ralph & Will (Note: Ralph was helped by his father Raffy, and Will was helped by his mother Mindy while they were still in the house.) / 5	Passed

=== Other tasks ===
Pinoy Big Brother: Celebrity Collab Edition other tasks
No.	Date & day assigned	Description	Participant(s)	Result
1	March 9 (Day 1)	The housemates were locked separately in the pool area. The hosts— Alexa, Gabbi, Mavy, and Melai— were tasked with helping by collecting bamboo sticks scattered around the house. The housemates used their belongings to connect the sticks and reach a key suspended on a logo to open the gate to the main house. If they fail to complete the task within 15 minutes, one host will be required to stay in the house for an undetermined period.	All housemates (Note: Michael and houseguest Ivana were not in the house during the task.)	Passed
1	March 9 (Day 1)	The housemates were locked separately in the pool area. The hosts— Alexa, Gabbi, Mavy, and Melai— were tasked with helping by collecting bamboo sticks scattered around the house. The housemates used their belongings to connect the sticks and reach a key suspended on a logo to open the gate to the main house. If they fail to complete the task within 15 minutes, one host will be required to stay in the house for an undetermined period.	Alexa, Gabbi, Mavy, Melai	Failed (Note: Big Brother chose Mavy to stay in the house as a consequence.)
2	March 11 (Day 3)	On Day 3, Big Brother informed Kira that Josh's birthday would be the next day. To celebrate, Big Brother secretly assigned Kira to spend extra time on the Twinkle Twinkle Big Star weekly task, with the time spent on the task matching the duration of Josh's pool party.	Kira	Passed (Note: Kira spent 30 minutes at the weekly task. Due to Kira's efforts, Big Brother doubled the pool party duration to 1 hour.)
3	March 16 (Day 8)	On Day 8, frequent rule violators must walk five laps around the pool while saying "Hindi ako lalabag sa mga patakaran ni Big Brother" (I will not break Big Brother's rules) as punishment. Afterward, each violator must take turns being a human pen by wearing a pen cap. The other housemates will use them to write the sentence on a whiteboard, with the last writing required to be in cursive. The violations will be cleared if the writings are legible.	All housemates (Note: except Ashley, Dustin, and Klarisse, who did not commit any house rule violations that week.)	Passed
4	March 17 (Day 9)	On Day 9, the Star Magic housemates must transfer a ball through a hole maze from Point A to Point B. If the ball falls, they must return to the start. If they succeed, the reward will be given to a Sparkle housemate. Unbeknownst to the Star Magic housemates, the reward is a nomination immunity medal, granting a Sparkle housemate immunity for the first nomination round. (Note: After deliberating, the Star Magic housemates awarded the nomination immunity medal to Charlie.)	Star Magic housemates	Passed
5	March 29 (Day 21)	On Day 21, each housemate must wear a crown. Starting from the first, each must stack a crown onto the next housemate's head until it reaches the last. The final housemate then enters the throne room to place a crown on Michelle, the new houseguest.	All housemates	Passed
6	March 30 (Day 22)	On Day 22, Big Brother asked Emilio and Vince, the new housemates, to name two things about each of them. Then, they must wear jester costumes and play charades with the housemates. Once the housemates correctly guess the two things about them, Emilio and Vince can reveal themselves as the new housemates.	All housemates	Passed
7	April 9 (Day 32)	**P-Drama**; The housemates must create two love stories with a Filipino (Pinoy) heart, featuring houseguest Ji Soo as the main character. Ji Soo must deliver three Filipino hugot (pick-up) lines correctly. For each correct line, one layer of the cup tower will be removed as part of their weekly task.	All housemates, Ji Soo	Passed (Note: Ji Soo has delivered three hugot lines correctly. Therefore, three layers of cups will be reduced)
8	April 25 (Day 48)	On Day 48, rule violators must stay inside a giant sack resembling the Earth as punishment while moving around the house to complete their household chores.	All housemates (Note: Except Klarisse and Ralph, who did not commit any house rule violations for the past weeks.)	Passed
9	April 30 (Day 53)	While Donny was asleep, the housemates had to discreetly shoot 126 baskets for him to be able to read his letter.	All housemates	Passed
10	May 4 (Day 57)	David disguised himself as a fitness instructor and, appearing in silhouette, led the housemates through a fitness routine.	All housemates, David	Passed
11	May 5 (Day 58)	Task leaders Shuvee and Bianca create a decoy weekly task as a fitness routine to test the emotions of each housemate for the secret weekly task.	Bianca, Shuvee	Passed
12	May 13 (Day 66)	Big Brother assigns Bianca and River a secret task for Dustin's birthday. To earn a reward for Dustin, Bianca must imitate Dustin's facial expressions 24 times, while River must repeat his signature compliment 'Matured' 24 times.	Bianca, River	Passed
13	May 20 (Day 73)	Through a radio communication device, Brent and Vince serve as the persona/avatar of Charlie and Ralph, who will issue commands from another line.	Brent, Vince	Passed
14	May 21 (Day 74)	The housemates were grouped by gender, taking turns wearing blindfolds, with the women going first. Big Brother's signal would tell one group when to remove their blindfolds, at which point the other group would immediately put theirs on. The game ended when the female housemates were the last to wear blindfolds. To remove their blindfolds, the females had to correctly guess the names of three male housemates by searching for them. However, the twist was that Charlie and Ralph, who were part of the secret weekly task the men had to hide, also had to remain still while the female housemates searched.	Male and female housemates	Passed
15	May 25 (Day 78)	The Big Intensity Challenge winners must discreetly leave last night's worn clothing on the garden area as proof before vanishing into a secret room, hidden from all asleep housemates.	AZ, Esnyr, Ralph, Shuvee	Passed
16	May 25 (Day 78)	**Money Roll Task – Part 1** The nominated housemates work together to roll 10 balls one at a time through a series of handheld panels into a piggy bank. When a ball drops, they must return to the starting point. Every successfully deposited ball earns ₱200 for the secret room.	Nominated housemates, B	Passed
17	May 26 (Day 79)	**Money Roll Task – Part 2** The nominated housemates work together to roll 5 balls one at a time through an additional series of handheld panels into a piggy bank. When a ball drops, they must return to the starting point. Every successfully deposited ball earns ₱400 for the secret room.	Nominated housemates, B	Passed
18	May 26 (Day 79)	**Money Roll Task – Part 3** The immune housemates work together to roll 4 balls one at a time through an additional series of handheld panels into a piggy bank. When a ball drops, they must return to the starting point. Every successfully deposited ball earns ₱600 for the secret room.	AZ, B, Esnyr, Jane, Ralph, Shuvee	Passed
19	June 8 (Day 92)	**The Art of Giving**; Each duo is required to produce an artistic piece representing their selected charity as part of the Charity Challenge, which they will then present to the houseguest, Heart.	All housemates	Passed
20	June 10 (Day 94)	**PBB Collab Fun Run**; Each duo must run 25 laps around the swimming pool. If they do this, they will receive five balls for the upcoming Charity Challenge	All housemates, Barbie	Passed
21	June 11 (Day 95)	The housemates and houseguest Gerald must collect 100 balls in the swimming pool for the Sa Mata ng Pag-tulong weekly task	All housemates, Gerald	Passed
22	June 14 (Day 98)	**Awit ng Dalawa (Song of Duo)**; The housemates and houseguest Maris must compose a song about the reflections of a duo.	All housemates, Maris	Passed

== Challenges ==
=== Duo battles ===
Introduced before the second nomination round, these are tasks to be performed by all eligible duos. The best-performing duo wins immunity from being nominated for that nomination round.

Pinoy Big Brother: Celebrity Collab Edition duo battles
No.	Date given	Challenge title and description	Participant(s)	Winner
1	April 4 (Day 27)	Each duo must bring a mini-sized PBB House from one end of the table to the other while passing it between the pillars standing on top of the table. If any of the pillars fall, the duo must return to the starting point to repeat the process. The duo that accomplished this task the fastest received immunity from being nominated during the second nomination round. Results: Rank / Duo / Time; 1 / Bianca & Mika / 4:16; 2 / Klarisse & Will / 4:27; 3 / Michael & River / 4:28; 4 / AZ & Ralph / 5:30; 5 / Esnyr & Josh / 5:42; 6 / Charlie & Kira / 6:17; 7 / Brent & Dustin / 6:45	AZ & Ralph; Bianca & Mika; Brent & Dustin; Charlie & Kira; Esnyr & Josh; Klarisse & Will; Michael & River	Bianca & Mika
2	April 18 (Day 41)	Each duo will take turns sorting the color tubes into their corresponding groups. The pair that completes this task the fastest will earn immunity from nomination during the third nomination round. Results: Rank / Duo / Time; 1 / AZ & Bianca / 3:10; 2 / Klarisse & Mika / 3:35; 3 / Esnyr & Will / 3:40; 4 / Josh & River / 4:01; 5 / Dustin & Ralph / 4:02; 6 / Emilio & Michael / 4:35; 7 / Brent & Vince / 6:49	AZ & Bianca; Brent & Vince; Dustin & Ralph; Emilio & Michael; Esnyr & Will; Josh & River; Klarisse & Mika	AZ & Bianca
3	May 4 (Day 57)	Duos compete in a clothes hanger toss-and-catch challenge: one throws, the other catches with a bar. Top scorers in five minutes win immunity from nomination during the fourth nomination round. Results: Rank / Duo / Score; 1 / Esnyr & Mika / 29; 2 / River & Vince / 27; 3 / Josh & Ralph / 18; 4 / Dustin & Xyriel / 14; 5 / AZ & Klarisse / 13; 6 / Brent & Will / 10; 7 / Bianca & Shuvee / 7	AZ & Klarisse; Bianca & Shuvee; Brent & Will; Dustin & Xyriel; Esnyr & Mika; Josh & Ralph; River & Vince	Esnyr & Mika

=== Group challenges ===
As in previous seasons, the housemates were divided into multiple teams to compete for immunity or reward on various occasions.

Pinoy Big Brother: Celebrity Collab Edition group challenges
No.
1
Date given
May 13
(Day 66)
Challenge title and description
Golden Seats
On Day 66, the housemates were divided into three groups for the Golden Seats challenges. These groups are based on their circus acts in The Big Carnival Concert weekly task. The winning team at the end of the challenges would have a chance to see their loved ones as part of the golden seats audience for "The Big Carnival Concert."

Teams:

- Team Juggling – Dustin, Mika, River, and Xyriel
- Team Spin Disc – AZ, Brent, Klarisse, and Vince
- Team Flower Stick – Bianca, Esnyr, Shuvee, and Will

Golden Seats Challenge result
Date given	Challenge title and description	Advanced	Eliminated
May 13 (Day 66)	Only We Know; Three teams must answer trivia questions about their loved ones. The top two teams with the most points would advance to the next round. Result: Team Juggling – 7 points; Team Spin Disc – 6 points; Team Flower Stick – 2 points	Team Juggling Team Spin Disc	Team Flower Stick
May 14 (Day 67)	Teams line up with photo baskets across each other. Players swing pendulum balls to hit rolling balls into their basket. Only direct shots count—bounced balls are invalid.	Team Spin Disc	Team Juggling

Winner
Team Spin Disc^{1}
Loser(s)
Team Juggling

Team Flower Stick

Note

1. Big Brother had a proposal to the winners of the Golden Seats Challenge to give a slot to the losing housemates. Only Brent gave up his slot to Mika.

=== Big Intensity Challenges ===
On Day 72, Big Brother announced the two Big Intensity Challenges, which would decide the housemates' final pairings. Housemates from both agencies would compete against each other. In each challenge, one Sparkle and one Star Magic housemate would win, earning immunity for the next nomination round and the power to choose their final duo. All other housemates who failed to win in either challenge were automatically nominated for the fifth nomination round.

Pinoy Big Brother: Celebrity Collab Edition Big Intensity Challenges
No.	Date given	Challenge title and description	Winners	
No.	Date given	Challenge title and description	Sparkle	Star Magic
1	May 21 (Day 74)	In this challenge, housemates must race to answer six Filipino-language questions, each contained in its own envelope. Once a housemate believes they have the correct answer, they must flip a cube using a spatula and make sure the first letter of that answer is shown on top. They can only advance to the next envelope after Big Brother approves both their answer and the letter displayed on the cube. The fastest Sparkle housemate and the fastest Star Magic housemate to correctly answer all six questions will win the first set of Final Duo Medals and immunity for the fifth nomination round. Questions and answers: Item / Question / Answer; 1 / What is the first letter of the so-called "King of the Jungle?" / Leon (L; lion); 2 / What is the first letter of the body part that is the first to detect odor? / IIong (I; nose); 3 / What is the first letter of the item that was believed to be hidden by Gen. Yamashita? / Ginto (G; gold); 4 / What is the first letter of the result of the equation "nine times four?" / Tatlumpu't anim (T; thirty-six); 5 / What is the first letter of the continent where the Pinoy Big Brother house is located? / Asya (A; Asia); 6 / What is the first letter of the opposite of West? / Silangan (S; East); Results: Rank / Sparkle housemate / Time / Star Magic housemate / Time; 1 / Shuvee / 6:05 / Ralph / 4:43; 2 / Will / 11:00 / Xyriel / 6:09; 3 / Dustin / 14:20 / Brent / 6:12; 4 / Mika / 20:46 / Klarisse / 6:31; 5 / Vince / 29:40 / Esnyr / 8:48; — / AZ / DNF / Bianca / DNF; — / Charlie / DNF / River / DNF	Shuvee	Ralph
2	May 22 (Day 75)	For this challenge, each housemate starts with a board holding 10 balloons. To earn more, a housemate will roll a ball onto specific landing spots, gaining 0 to 3 additional balloons based on where it lands. A housemate will have three attempts to increase their balloon count. Afterward, housemates will use the same ball-rolling method to correctly land the ball on their number of choice; the higher the number, the more of another housemate's balloons they can pop. This continues until only one housemate still has a balloon on their board. The last Sparkle housemate and the last Star Magic housemate standing will win the final Final Duo medals and immunity from the fifth nomination round, while all losing housemates will be automatically nominated. Results: Sparkle housemate / Balloons earned / Order / Star Magic housemate / Balloons earned / Order; AZ / 16 / 6 / Bianca / 11 / 1; Charlie / 15 / 5 / Brent / 12 / 4; Dustin / 13 / 4 / Esnyr / 12 / 6; Mika / 10 / 3 / Klarisse / 16 / 5; Vince / 15 / 1 / River / 16 / 2; Will / 14 / 2 / Xyriel / 11 / 3	AZ	Esnyr

=== Big Jump challenges ===
Shortly after Charlie & Esnyr claimed the first spot in the Big Four, Big Brother announced that the remaining spots would be determined via three Big Jump challenges. The winners of each challenge secured a spot in the Big Four, while the losers of the third Big Jump challenge became the last evictees for this edition.

Pinoy Big Brother: Celebrity Collab Edition Big Jump Challenges
No.	Date given	Challenge title and description	Participant(s)	Winner
1	June 24 (Day 108)	First Big Jump Challenge; Duos had to transfer wooden puzzle blocks across a narrow platform using a block holder. Each housemate had to pull one end of the rope attached to the holder. If the block fell at any point after a "save point," the duo may restart from the previous save point. After transferring twenty puzzle blocks, they had to solve the puzzle at the building area. Each duo was given a freeze power that freezes all other duos for 10 minutes. When the duo thought they are done with the puzzle, they had to raise their hand, signaling a ninja to check, who then relayed his verdict to Big Brother privately. The first duo that solved the puzzle secured the second spot in the Big Four.	AZ & River; Bianca & Dustin; Brent & Mika; Ralph & Will	Ralph & Will
2	June 25 (Day 109)	Second Big Jump Challenge; Each duo was presented seven letter blocks: B, I, G, F, O, U, and R. They had to squeeze the 'B' block in between them using any body part of their choice. After some time, duos were given thirty seconds to squeeze the next letter block in between them while still retaining the previous blocks. The process continued until they formed the word "BIGFOUR." They were not required to stay in one spot while completing the challenge. Furthermore, each duo could rest for 100 seconds. If any of the blocks fell, the duo was eliminated from the challenge. The last duo standing secured the third spot in the Big Four. Results: Duo / Order; AZ & River / 3; Bianca & Dustin / 1; Brent & Mika / 2	AZ & River; Bianca & Dustin; Brent & Mika	AZ & River
3	June 27 (Day 111)	Third Big Jump Challenge; Duos had to transfer red plastic cups using a stick and guide the stick from start to finish via a wall maze. They could transfer multiple cups as long as those weren't stacked tightly. They had to do this alternately. If the cup(s) fell, they had to go back to the starting point. At some point during the task, Big Brother told each duo to assign a transporter and a navigator. The transporter, who could not see the wall maze, relied on instructions from the navigator. Each duo member alternated between these roles after every successful transfer. Using the transferred cups, they had to build a tower. The duo that built the taller tower secured the final spot in the Big Four, while the losers became the last evictees for this season. Results: Duo / Layers / Height; Bianca & Dustin / 13 / 56 in.; Brent & Mika / 16 / 69 in.	Bianca & Dustin; Brent & Mika	Brent & Mika

=== One Million Vote Challenges ===
The four remaining duos will face a series of challenges to earn a portion of the one million votes to save at stake, which will be combined with the public's votes in the finale. The challenge is divided into two parts, with 400,000 votes at stake in the first part and 600,000 votes in the second and final part. The duo will receive the votes only if they finish the challenge, which they may choose to quit at any point.

Pinoy Big Brother: Celebrity Collab Edition One Million Vote Challenges
No.	Date given	Challenge title and description	Big 4			
No.	Date given	Challenge title and description	AZ & River	Brent & Mika	Charlie & Esnyr	Ralph & Will
1	July 1 (Day 115)	First One Million Vote Challenge; Duos must walk across a giant seesaw to place basketballs on the Big Brother eye. These basketballs were marked with plus or minus symbols, symbolizing the number of positive and negative comments they agreed upon in the Confession Room. Duos must do this alternately, but they may only switch once the current housemate is successful and is off the seesaw. If either the housemate or the ball falls, they must go back to the starting point. After placing ten basketballs, the duo must go back to the starting area to finish the challenge. The first duo to finish the challenge will receive 200,000 votes, the second duo will receive 100,000 votes, the third duo will receive 60,000 votes, and the fourth duo will receive 40,000 votes.	100,000	200,000	60,000	40,000
2	July 1 (Day 115)	Second One Million Vote Challenge; Duos must transfer ten tower pieces to the other side. Just like the basketballs in the previous challenge, the blocks were marked with plus or minus symbols, symbolizing the number of positive and negative comments they agreed upon in the Confession Room. The stacking area is attached to a rope obstacle that the housemates must cross. Each duo member must stack five blocks. If the blocks fall, they must restart. The first duo to finish the challenge will receive 300,000 votes, the second duo will receive 150,000 votes, the third duo will receive 90,000 votes, and the fourth duo will receive 60,000 votes.	60,000	150,000	300,000	90,000
Total votes			160,000	350,000	360,000	130,000

=== Other challenges ===
Pinoy Big Brother: Celebrity Collab Edition other challenges
No.	Date & day assigned	Description	Participant(s)	Winner
1	April 3 (Day 26)	On Day 26, Big Brother asked each housemate to give points to other housemates based on their authenticity: three points for those who are being authentic, two points for those who are lacking authenticity, and one point for those who are not being true. After the rankings were done, flags were handed out to everyone. Anyone who got the highest average received the green flag, anyone who got the lowest received the red flag, and the rest received a yellow flag. Results: Rank(s) / Housemate / Average; 1–2 / Esnyr / 3.00; 1–2 / Klarisse / 3.00; 3 / Charlie / 2.84; 4–5 / Brent / 2.76; 4–5 / River / 2.76; 6–8 / Dustin / 2.61; 6–8 / Kira / 2.61; 6–8 / Ralph / 2.61; 9–11 / AZ / 2.38; 9–11 / Will / 2.38; 9–11 / Josh / 2.38; 12–13 / Bianca / 2.30; 12–13 / Michael / 2.30; 14 / Mika / 2.04	All housemates^{1}	Esnyr & Klarisse
2	April 5 (Day 28)	Mr. Ahon Lusong 2025 and Pool Dating Game; Esnyr and the female housemates organized a dating game for the male housemates. First, the male housemates showcased their modeling skills at the pool area. Then, the female housemates decided to pick five male housemates to advance to the next round. After that, the mystery guest searcher, Sanya, conducted a Q&A session based on her preferences. Finally, Sanya gave an apple to the male housemate she chose for a date.	Male housemates	Ralph
3	May 9 (Day 62)	I Think I Love You Dance Challenge; The housemates, divided into two (Sparkle and Star Magic) must create a dance choreography incorporating David's original song "I Think I Love You".	Sparkle housemates Star Magic housemates	Star Magic housemates
4	June 10 (Day 94)	Patong-patong sa Pag-tulong (Stacked for a Cause); On Day 95, Duos take turns: one places a ball stacker (with a fork on one end and handlebar on the other), the other adds a ball. The duos passed through obstacles to the tower. If the tower falls, restart. Tallest stable tower after 1 hour wins ₱100,000 for chosen charity.	All housemates	AZ & River^{2}

Note

1. Emilio and Vince did not participate in this challenge as they had just entered the house for that week.
2. AZ and River receive ₱100,000 for the Cancer Treatment and Support Foundation, Inc. as their chosen charity.

== Duo formation history ==
Throughout the season, the housemates were periodically paired into duos through tasks and other challenges. The six final duos were determined on Days 89 to 91.

Legend and color key

Sparkle housemate
Star Magic housemate

Bold name Indicates final duo

Italic name Indicates houseguest

Duration of duo pairing
Cycle	#1	#2	#3	#4	#5	#6	Final
Start	Day 3 March 11	Day 9 March 17	Day 22; March 30	Day 36; April 13	Day 50; April 27	Day 64; May 11	Days 89–91; June 5–7
End	Day 7 March 15	Day 21; March 29	Day 35; April 12	Day 49; April 26	Day 63; May 10	Day 71; May 18	Day 119; July 5
AZ	Esnyr	Kira	Ralph	Bianca	Klarisse	Brent	River
Bianca	Not in the House (Day 1–9)	Charlie	Mika	AZ	Shuvee	Will	Dustin
Brent	Michael	Mika	Dustin	Vince	Will	AZ	Mika
Charlie	AC	Bianca	Kira	Evicted (Day 35)			Esnyr
Dustin	Klarisse	Esnyr	Brent	Ralph	Xyriel	River	Bianca
Esnyr	AZ	Dustin	Josh	Will	Mika	Shuvee	Charlie
Klarisse	Dustin	Josh	Will	Mika	AZ	Vince	Shuvee
Mika	Ralph	Brent	Bianca	Klarisse	Esnyr	Xyriel	Brent
Ralph	Mika	Michael	AZ	Dustin	Josh	Evicted (Day 63)	Will
River	Will		Michael	Josh	Vince	Dustin	AZ
Shuvee	Not in the House (Day 1–35)			Xyriel	Bianca	Esnyr	Klarisse
Will	River		Klarisse	Esnyr	Brent	Bianca	Ralph
Vince	Not in the House (Day 1–21)		Emilio	Brent	River	Klarisse	Evicted (Day 84)
Xyriel	Not in the House (Day 1–35)			Shuvee	Dustin	Mika	Evicted (Day 84)
Josh	Kira	Klarisse	Esnyr	River	Ralph	Evicted (Day 63)	
Emilio	Not in the House (Day 1–21)		Vince	Michael	Evicted (Day 49)		
Michael	Brent	Ralph	River	Emilio	Evicted (Day 49)		
Kira	Josh	AZ	Charlie	Evicted (Day 35)			
AC	Charlie	Ashley	Evicted (Day 21)				
Ashley	Ivana	AC	Evicted (Day 21)				
Note	^{Note 1}	^{Note 2}	^{Note 3}	^{Note 4}	^{Note 5}	^{Note 6}	^{Notes} ^{7}^{,} ^{8}^{, and} ^{9}
Reference							

Notes

1. On Day 3, the housemates were tasked to play a game which is similar to The Boat is Sinking game; they were instructed to group themselves into sets of eight, six, and finally two. Each group had to contain an equal number of Sparkle and Star Magic housemates. After the final round, Big Brother revealed that the pairs formed during the game would serve as the official duos for their first cycle.
2. On Day 9, housemates chose rope ends—blue for Sparkle, red for Star Magic—to form new pairs by matching ropes. Charlie didn't join because she had immunity, and Bianca entered after pairs were set. In the second nomination round, Bianca and Charlie were treated as a pair since both had immunity.
3. On Day 22, housemates had five minutes to move balls using three pedestals worth 1, 2, or 3 points each. They were ranked by total points, and the highest-ranked unpaired housemate chose a partner, but no one could pick someone they’d paired with before. Josh and Michael tied with 19 points; Josh picked Esnyr first, then Michael chose River. Dustin picked Brent, Kira chose Charlie, Ralph picked AZ, Will chose Klarisse, and Mika picked Bianca. Emilio and Vince, new housemates, were paired automatically.
4. On Day 36, the housemates completed a task where they had to scoop balls containing correct answers from a press conference with new housemates Shuvee and Xyriel. The fastest housemate to scoop both correct balls could choose a new partner, but no one could choose someone they’d already been paired with. Klarisse finished first and picked Mika; Josh followed, choosing River. Michael selected Emilio, Vince picked Brent, Bianca chose AZ, Dustin picked Ralph, and Will chose Esnyr. Shuvee and Xyriel, as new housemates, were automatically paired.
5. On Day 50, housemates had five minutes to do kendama tricks and earn points. They got 1 point for the big cup, 5 points for the small cup, and 10 points for the base cup. The highest-ranked unpaired housemate got to pick a partner, but no one could pick someone they had already paired with. Ralph scored 80 points and picked Josh. Vince also scored 80 points and chose River. Josh, with 80 points too, could not pick. Dustin scored 78 points and picked Xyriel. Klarisse got 76 points and chose AZ. Mika scored 74 points and picked Esnyr. Will scored 70 points and chose Brent. Shuvee scored 45 points and picked Bianca. The rest either were already picked or couldn't choose.
6. On Day 64, each housemate had to pull five cups with a ball on top across the finish line. If the ball fell, they had to place it back and start again on that lane. Housemates were ranked by how fast they finished, and the highest-ranked unpaired housemate could pick a new partner. No one could pick someone they had already been paired with. Esnyr was fastest, finishing in 1 minute 51 seconds, and chose Shuvee as partner. Shuvee finished next but could not pick. Will finished third and picked Bianca. Dustin was fourth and chose River. AZ came fifth and picked Brent. Klarisse finished ninth and chose Vince. Xyriel finished eleventh and picked Mika. Others either were already paired or did not get to pick.
7. On Day 85, the housemates participated in a self-ranking exercise to determine pairings for an upcoming duo task. Housemates from Star Magic and Sparkle talent agencies independently ranked members of the opposing agency based on perceived efficiency. Tied ranks between the agencies were resolved through a vote. Additionally, Big Brother privately solicited individual preferences of the housemates for their respective desired and least desired duo partners. The composite results established the final ranking from first to twelfth place: Ralph, Shuvee, Klarisse, Will, Brent, Mika, Esnyr, AZ, Bianca, Dustin, River, and Charlie. This final order dictated the sequence for initiating the final duo formation task.
8. For the final duo formation task on Day 87, each of the first eleven housemates had a 20-second headstart over the housemate ranked behind them. Additionally, the four victors of the "Big Intensity Challenge" received a significant advantage: the ability to "freeze" all other housemates for one minute at any point during the task. For the task, the housemates had to memorize their loved ones and then place the wooden poles bearing their pictures on a handheld panel in the correct order and carry the panel to a podium. They must restart if any of the wooden poles fall or if they get the order incorrect. The final rankings, from first to twelfth, were recorded as: Ralph, Shuvee, Klarisse, Dustin, Will, Mika, AZ, Bianca, Charlie, River, Brent, and Esnyr.
9. On Days 89 to 91 for the final duo formation, housemates can choose someone they have been paired up with in the past. However, the chosen housemate may choose to reject. They may only do this once. For being the first to choose, Ralph cannot be rejected by whoever he chooses.

== Nomination history ==
In each nomination, duos assign three points to one duo and one point to another, with the nomination table reflecting this by listing the duo receiving three points first. Underlined names denote the intended target for that specific point, if any. Otherwise, no target was identified.

Legend and color key

Sparkle housemate
Star Magic housemate
Immune or exempt
Automatically nominated
Ineligible to vote
Wildcard

Pinoy Big Brother: Celebrity Collab Edition nomination history
	#1	#2	#3	#4	The Big Comeback	Big Intensity Challenge	Face-to-Face Nomination	Big Tapatan	Big Jump	Big Night	Nominations received
	#1	#2	#3	#4	The Big Comeback	#5	#6	#7		Big Night	Nominations received
Eviction day and date	Day 21 March 29	Day 35 April 12	Day 49 April 26	Day 63 May 10	Day 71 May 18	Day 84 May 31	Day 98 June 14	—	Day 112 June 28	Day 119 July 5	Nominations received
Nomination day and date	Day 15; March 23	Day 29; April 6	Day 43; April 20	Day 57; May 4	Day 64; May 11	Day 78; May 25	Day 93; June 9	Days 102 & 107; June 18 & 23	—	Day 112; June 28	Nominations received
Brent	Michael & Ralph; AC & Ashley	Michael & River; AZ & Ralph	Emilio & Michael; Dustin & Ralph	Dustin & Xyriel; AZ & Klarisse	No nominations	No nominations	Bianca & Dustin; AZ & River	No nominations	No nominations	Winner	20 (0; +1)
Mika	Same vote as Brent	Same vote as Bianca	Same vote as Klarisse	Same vote as Esnyr	No nominations	No nominations	Same vote as Brent	No nominations	No nominations	Winner	1 (0; +1)
Ralph	Same vote as Michael	Same vote as AZ	Same vote as Dustin	Same vote as Josh	Evicted (Day 63)	No nominations	Bianca & Dustin; AZ & River	No nominations	No nominations	Runner-up	31 (2)
Will	Same vote as River	Same vote as Klarisse	Same vote as Esnyr	Same vote as Brent	No nominations	No nominations	Same vote as Ralph	No nominations	No nominations	Runner-up	18 (2; +1)
Charlie	Same vote as Bianca	Michael & River; Klarisse & Will	Evicted (Day 35)			No nominations	Bianca & Dustin; AZ & River	No nominations	Finalist	3rd place	9 (11; +1)
Esnyr	Same vote as Dustin	AZ & Ralph; Brent & Dustin	Brent & Vince; Dustin & Ralph	Josh & Ralph; River & Vince	No nominations	No nominations	Same vote as Charlie	No nominations	Finalist	3rd place	4 (11)
AZ	AC & Ashley; River & Will	Brent & Dustin; Klarisse & Will	Brent & Vince; Emilio & Michael	Dustin & Xyriel; River & Vince	No nominations	No nominations	Klarisse & Shuvee; Bianca & Dustin	No nominations	No nominations	4th place	20 (2)
River	AC & Ashley; AZ & Kira	Same vote as Michael	Same vote as Josh	Josh & Ralph; AZ & Klarisse	No nominations	No nominations	Same vote as AZ	No nominations	No nominations	4th place	27 (2; +1)
Bianca	Michael & Ralph; AC & Ashley	Charlie & Kira; AZ & Ralph	Same vote as AZ	Josh & Ralph; Brent & Will	No nominations	No nominations	AZ & River; Ralph & Will	No nominations	No nominations	Evicted (Day 112)	13 (0; +2)
Dustin	River & Will; Michael & Ralph	Same vote as Brent	Brent & Vince; Klarisse & Mika	AZ & Klarisse; Brent & Will	No nominations	No nominations	Same vote as Bianca	No nominations	No nominations	Evicted (Day 112)	28 (0; +1)
Klarisse	Same vote as Josh	Charlie & Kira; Michael & River	Dustin & Ralph; Emilio & Michael	Same vote as AZ	No nominations	No nominations	Bianca & Dustin; AZ & River	Evicted (Day 98)			14 (+1)
Shuvee	Not in the House (Day 1–35)		Exempt	Same vote as Bianca	No nominations	No nominations	Same vote as Klarisse	Evicted (Day 98)			3 (+1)
Xyriel	Not in the House (Day 1–35)		Exempt	Same vote as Dustin	No nominations	No nominations	Evicted (Day 84)				6 (+1)
Vince	Not in the House (Day 1–21)	Exempt	Same vote as Brent	Same vote as River	No nominations	No nominations	Evicted (Day 84)				18 (+1)
Josh	Michael & Ralph; River & Will	Same vote as Esnyr	Brent & Vince; Esnyr & Will	River & Vince; Brent & Will	Evicted (Day 63)						12
Emilio	Not in the House (Day 1–21)	Exempt	Esnyr & Will; Brent & Vince	Evicted (Day 49)							5
Michael	Josh & Klarisse; AC & Ashley	Charlie & Kira; AZ & Ralph	Same vote as Emilio	Evicted (Day 49)							22
Kira	Same vote as AZ	Same vote as Charlie	Evicted (Day 35)								11
AC	River & Will; AZ & Kira	Evicted (Day 21)									9
Ashley	Same vote as AC	Evicted (Day 21)									9
Notes	^{Notes} ^{1}^{, and} ^{2}	^{Note} ^{3}	^{Note} ^{4}	^{Note} ^{5}	^{Notes} ^{6}^{, and} ^{7}	^{Notes} ^{8}^{, and} ^{9}	^{Note} ^{10}	^{Note} ^{11}		^{Note} ^{12}	
Duo battle winners	None	Bianca & Mika	AZ & Bianca	Esnyr & Mika	None						
Up for eviction	AC & Ashley; Michael & Ralph; River & Will	AZ & Ralph; Charlie & Kira; Michael & River	Brent & Vince; Dustin & Ralph; Emilio & Michael	Bianca & Shuvee; Dustin & Xyriel; Josh & Ralph	Ashley; Charlie; Josh AC; Kira; Ralph	Charlie; Dustin; Mika; Vince; Will Bianca; Brent; Klarisse; River; Xyriel	AZ & River; Bianca & Dustin; Klarisse & Shuvee	AZ & River; Bianca & Dustin; Brent & Mika; Charlie & Esnyr; Ralph & Will	AZ & River; Bianca & Dustin; Brent & Mika; Ralph & Will	Open Voting	
Saved from eviction	Michael & Ralph; 45.89% River & Will; 36.87%	AZ & Ralph; 37.24% Michael & River; 32.77%	Dustin & Ralph; 39.93% Brent & Vince; 30.95%	Dustin & Xyriel; 34.82% Bianca & Shuvee; 32.83%	Charlie; 40.44% Ralph; 81.28%	Will; 33.09% Dustin; 25.20% Mika; 22.10% Charlie; 10.35% Brent; 32.05% Bianca; 30.49% Klarisse; 19.58% River; 13.83%	Bianca & Dustin; 36.83% AZ & River; 31.67%	Charlie & Esnyr; 11 of 15 votes to save	Ralph & Will won first Big Jump AZ & River won second Big Jump Brent & Mika won third Big Jump	Brent & Mika; 33.03%	
Evicted	AC & Ashley; 17.25%	Charlie & Kira; 29.99%	Emilio & Michael; 29.12%	Josh & Ralph; 32.35%	Josh; 33.16% Ashley; 26.40% AC; 14.22% Kira; 4.50%	Vince; 9.26% Xyriel; 4.06%	Klarisse & Shuvee; 31.50%	AZ & River; 2 of 15 votes to save Ralph & Will; 2 of 15 votes to save Bianca & Dustin; 0 of 15 votes to save Brent & Mika; 0 of 15 votes to save	Bianca & Dustin lost third Big Jump	Ralph & Will; 25.88% Charlie & Esnyr; 22.91% AZ & River; 8.77%	
Ref.											

Notes

1. The housemates from Star Magic, except Bianca, successfully completed a designated task. Big Brother granted them the privilege of selecting one Sparkle housemate to receive immunity from the initial nominations. The housemates unanimously chose Charlie.
2. Bianca, a newly introduced Star Magic housemate, was automatically granted immunity due to her late entry into the house on Day 10, five days before the first nomination round. She was subsequently paired with Charlie, who had earlier received immunity through the collective decision of the Star Magic housemates following a successful challenge.
3. Emilio and Vince, who entered the house as new housemates on Day 22 (the day following the first eviction), were exempted from the second nomination round. For the subsequent nomination round, the two were automatically paired.
4. Shuvee and Xyriel, new housemates who entered on Day 36 (the day after the second eviction), were exempted from the third nomination round. They were also automatically paired for the ongoing nomination round.
5. Shuvee received an automatic nomination for violating house rules by using a lapel microphone in the swimming pool. Adhering to the duos format, her partner, Bianca, was also automatically nominated.
6. The "Big Comeback" twist allowed previously evicted Sparkle and Star Magic housemates to re-enter the house. The voting process for this segment was conducted independently for Sparkle and Star Magic housemates. Evicted housemates Emilio and Michael opted not to participate in The Big Comeback due to personal commitments.
7. Public voting for the "Big Comeback" twist, conducted via Maya, concluded on Day 70. The results, announced on Day 71, declared Ralph and Charlie the winners.
8. AZ, Esnyr, Ralph, and Shuvee secured immunity for the fifth nomination round after winning in two Big Intensity Challenges. All housemates who did not win these challenges were automatically nominated for the eviction round.
9. Public voting for this particular eviction round was individual; however, one Sparkle housemate and one Star Magic housemate were still slated for eviction.
10. For the face-to-face nomination, housemates publicly gave their nominations through hanging a black medal containing the number "1" or "3" around the necks of the duos of their choice.
11. On the seventh and final nomination round, the five duo housemates cast their votes through positive nominations. The challengers also voted for positive nominations individually. The duo with the highest combined number of votes was directly qualified for the Big Night. The remaining duos then competed in three "Big Jump" challenges to determine the remaining finalists.
12. For the Big Night, unlimited voting and the vote to save-evict system were implemented to determine the winners of this edition.

=== Big Tapatan voting ===
On Days 102 and 107, the house challengers and housemates respectively voted for a duo to become the first members of the Big 4.

Had there been a tie, the duos would have competed in a head-to-head in a Big Jump Challenge. The remaining four duos will compete in three Big Jump challenges to complete the season's Big Four.

Days 102 & 107: Voting for the first Big 4 slot
Duo to be voted	Voters															Total
Duo to be voted	Challengers (former housemates)										Duo housemates					Total
Duo to be voted	AC	Ashley	Emilio	Josh	Kira	Klarisse	Michael	Shuvee	Vince	Xyriel	AZ & River	Bianca & Dustin	Brent & Mika	Charlie & Esnyr	Ralph & Will	Total
AZ & River	—	—	—	—	—	—	—	—	—	✔	N/A	—	—	—	✔	2
Bianca & Dustin	—	—	—	—	—	—	—	—	—	—	—	N/A	—	—	—	0
Brent & Mika	—	—	—	—	—	—	—	—	—	—	—	—	N/A	—	—	0
Charlie & Esnyr	✔	✔	✔	✔	✔	✔	✔	✔	✔	—	✔	✔	—	N/A	—	11
Ralph & Will	—	—	—	—	—	—	—	—	—	—	—	—	✔	✔	N/A	2

== The Big Night ==
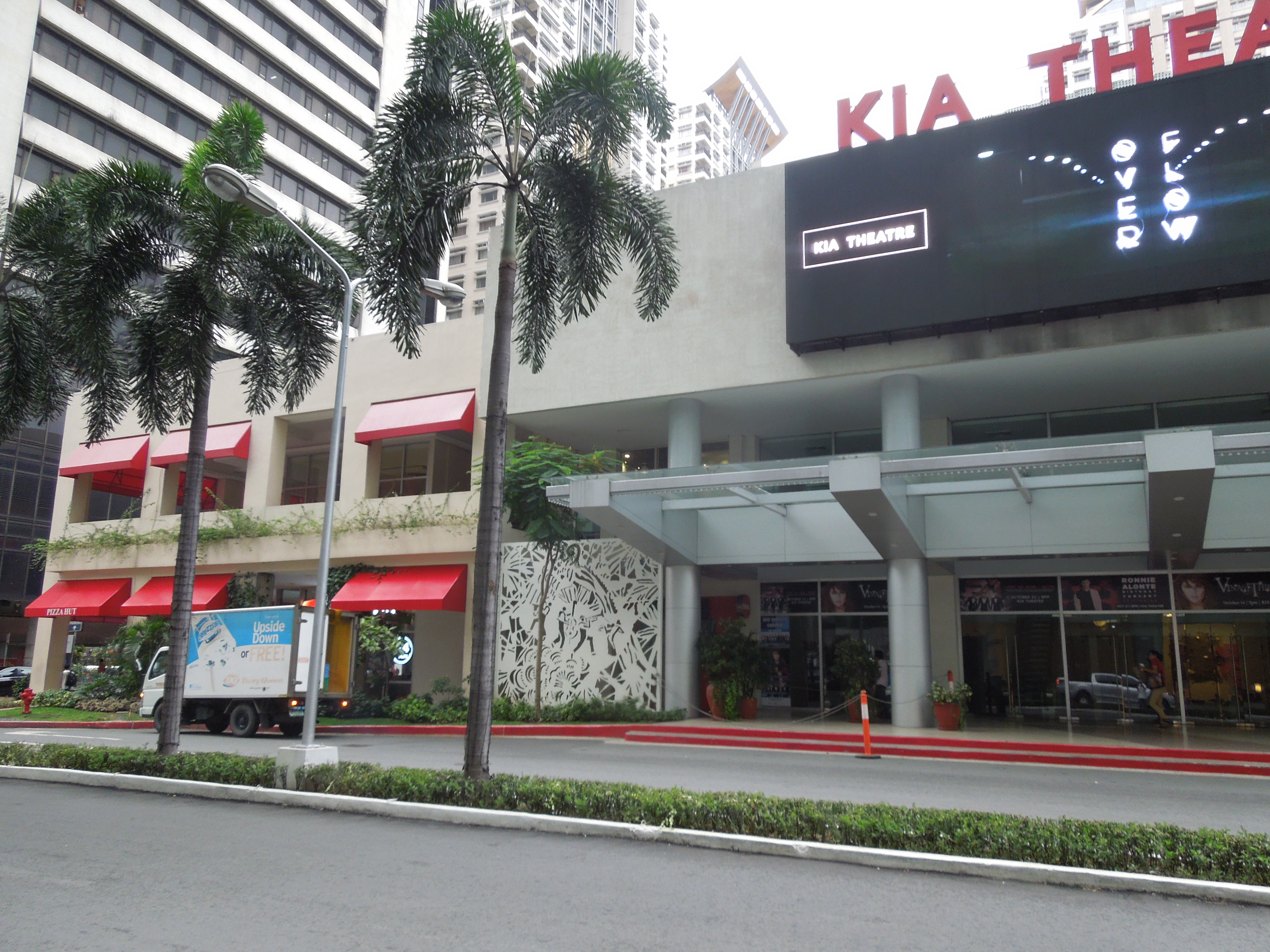
The New Frontier Theater (pictured in 2016) served as the venue for the finale.

The season finale, titled The Big Night, was held on July 5, 2025 aired on a special timeslot running from 9:15 p.m. to 10:52 p.m., at the New Frontier Theater in Quezon City.

The event included performances of former housemates, houseguests Bianca Umali, Michelle Dee, Donny Pangilinan, and contestants of Tawag ng Tanghalan: All-Star Grand Resbak and The Clash. The Big Four faced the public vote, with the public allowed to cast unlimited votes and the save-to-evict voting enabled for the round. The winning duo, referred to as the "Big Winner Duo" received ₱1,000,000 each, while the first, second, and third runners-up, referred to as the "Big Placer Duos", each received ₱500,000, ₱300,000, and ₱200,000 respectively from the sponsor BingoPlus.

This was the first Big Night to be held outside ABS-CBN's network-owned production facilities since Otso in 2019.

Day 119: Big Winner Vote
Duo		Votes			Result
Duo		To-Save	To-Evict	Net	Result
D	Brent & Mika	33.46%	-0.43%	33.03%	Big Winner Duo
U	Ralph & Will	27.03%	-1.15%	25.88%	2nd Big Placer Duo
O	AZ & River	11.54%	-2.77%	8.77%	4th Big Placer Duo
S	Charlie & Esnyr	23.26%	-0.35%	22.91%	3rd Big Placer Duo

== Notable events ==
In an episode aired on April 2, 2025, Klarisse De Guzman publicly came out as bisexual. During a task where housemates had to share personal stories, De Guzman revealed that she had been in a same-sex relationship with her partner, Trina, for four years. She expressed her pride and relief, stating, "I’m so happy and I’m so proud of myself that I’m finally out." Although her family had been aware of her sexuality, this marked the first time De Guzman shared her truth publicly. She acknowledged her previous fear of judgment and the potential impact on her career but emphasized the freedom she now felt. The revelation was met with widespread support from her fellow housemates and viewers.

== Reception ==
According to AGB Nielsen Philippines' Nationwide Urban Television Audience Measurement People in television homes, the pilot episode of Pinoy Big Brother: Celebrity Collab Edition earned an 8.6% rating. The final episode scored a 10.5% rating.

== Fancon and future season ==
During the Big Night held on July 5, 2025, it was announced that the collaboration between GMA Network and ABS-CBN for the duo format of Pinoy Big Brother is slated for a second season. Host Bianca Gonzalez announced the next season following the presentation of awards to the season's winners. Furthermore, the housemates from this season are scheduled to participate in a fancon event. Titled, "The Big ColLOVE," the event was held on August 10, 2025, at the Smart Araneta Coliseum. Ticket selling commenced on July 8, 2025, and sold out on August 3, 2025.

Preceded by Pinoy Big Brother: Gen 11	Pinoy Big Brother: Celebrity Collab Edition; March 9, 2025 — July 5, 2025	Succeeded by Pinoy Big Brother: Celebrity Collab Edition 2.0
