= Angeline Quinto discography =

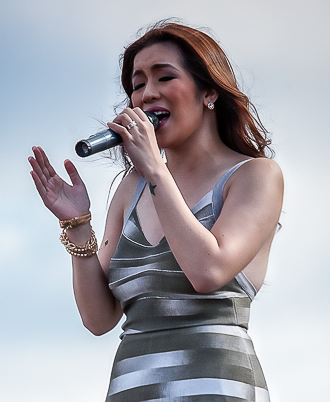
- Quinto in 2014
- Studio albums: 4
- Soundtrack albums: 1
- Singles: 21
- Reissue albums: 1
- Promotional singles: 3

Filipino singer Angeline Quinto has released four studio albums, one television soundtrack, 21 singles (including four as a featured artist), and three promotional singles. In addition, her songs have been used in 35 films and television series. In 2011, she won the television talent show Star Power and signed a record deal with Star Music. That year, she released her self-titled debut studio album, which was supported by the single "Patuloy ang Pangarap". It was certified double platinum by the Philippine Association of the Record Industry (PARI). She later released a repackaged edition or reissue of the album.

Quinto's second studio album, Fall in Love Again, was released in March 2012. The title track served as the love theme of her feature film Born to Love You. Other songs from the album were also used on the soundtracks of television shows: "Saan Darating ang Umaga" in Budoy, "Hanggang" in Walang Hanggan, "Nag-iisang Bituin" in Princess and I, and "Kung Ako'y Iiwan Mo" in the series of the same name. Her third studio album, Higher Ground, was released in January 2014 and featured the self-penned lead single "Sana2x". Quinto then released the soundtrack of the revenge drama series Sana Bukas pa ang Kahapon in June 2014. It marked the first time a Filipino artist recorded all the songs for a television show soundtrack.

In 2016, Quinto collaborated with Michael Pangilinan for "Parang Tayo, pero Hindi" as part of the songwriting competition Himig Handog P-Pop Love Songs. The song preceded her fourth studio album @LoveAngelineQuinto, which was released in January 2017. The album was further supported by the singles "Para Bang, Para Lang", "Di Na Tayo", and "Nanghihinayang". In 2018, Quinto was featured on Dingdong Avanzado's single "Paalam Na", and she released "Aking Pagmamahal" featuring Ladzkie the following year.

== Albums ==
=== Studio albums ===
List of studio albums, with sales figures and certifications
Title	Album details	Sales	Certifications	Ref(s)
Angeline Quinto	Released: March 26, 2011; Label: Star Music; Formats: CD, digital download, LP, streaming	PHL: 40,000 (Note: Philippine sales figure equivalent of platinum certification for Angeline Quinto.)	PARI: 2× Platinum	
Fall in Love Again	Released: March 25, 2012; Label: Star Music; Formats: CD, digital download, LP, streaming	PHL: 20,000 (Note: Philippine sales figure equivalent of platinum certification for Fall in Love Again.)	PARI: Platinum	
Higher Love	Released: January 15, 2014; Label: Star Music; Formats: CD, digital download, LP, streaming	—	—	
@LoveAngelineQuinto	Released: January 26, 2017; Label: Star Music; Formats: CD, digital download, LP, streaming	—	—	

=== Reissues ===
List of reissues
Title	Album details	Ref(s)
Angeline Quinto: Patuloy ang Pangarap	Released: 2011; Label: Star Music; Formats: CD, digital download, LP, streaming	

=== Soundtrack albums ===
List of soundtrack albums, with sales figures and certifications
Title	Album details	Sales	Certifications	Ref(s)
Sana Bukas Pa ang Kahapon	Released: June 30, 2014; Label: Star Music; Formats: CD, digital download, LP, streaming	PHL: 7,500 (Note: Philippine sales figure equivalent of gold certification for Sana Bukas Pa ang Kahapon.)	PARI: Gold	

== Singles ==
=== As lead artist ===
List of singles as lead artist, showing year released and originating album
Title	Year	Album	Ref(s)
"Patuloy ang Pangarap"	2011	Angeline Quinto	
"Kunin Mo Na ang Lahat sa Akin"	2011	Angeline Quinto	
"Bakit Ba Minamahal Kita"	2012	Fall in Love Again	
"Fall in Love Again"	2012	Fall in Love Again	
"If You Asked Me To" (with Erik Santos)	2012	Fall in Love Again	
"Saan Darating ang Umaga"	2012	Fall in Love Again	
"Hanggang"	2012	Fall in Love Again	
"Nag-iisang Bituin"	2012	Fall in Love Again	
"Kung Ako'y Iiwan Mo"	2012	Fall in Love Again	
"Lipad ng Pangarap" (with Regine Velasquez)	2012	Fall in Love Again	
"Sana2x"	2014	Higher Love	
"Nag-iisa Lang"	2014	Higher Love	
"Para Bang, Para Lang"	2017	@LoveAngelineQuinto	
"Di Na Tayo"	2017	@LoveAngelineQuinto	
"At Ang Hirap"	2017	@LoveAngelineQuinto	
"Nanghihinayang"	2017	@LoveAngelineQuinto	
"Parang Tayo, pero Hindi" (with Michael Pangilinan)	2017	@LoveAngelineQuinto	
"Aking Pagmamahal" (featuring Ladzkie)	2019		
"Salamat, Ika'y Dumating"
"Take It All"	2024		
"Being With You"	2025	Non-album single	

=== As featured artist ===
List of singles as featured artist, showing year released and originating album
Title	Year	Album	Ref(s)
"In Love with You" (Christian Bautista featuring Angeline Quinto)	2012	First Class Outbound	
"This I Promise You" (Erik Santos featuring Angeline Quinto)	2015	Champion Reborn	
"Parang Langit" (Daryl Ong featuring Angeline Quinto)	2016	Daryl Ong	
"Paalam Na" (Dingdong Avanzado featuring Angeline Quinto)	2018	20/30	

=== Promotional singles ===
List of promotional singles, showing year released and originating album
Title	Year	Album	Ref(s)
"Piliin Mo ang Pilipinas" (with Vince Bueno)	2011	Non-album promotional single	
"One Day"	2013	Himig Handog P-Pop Love Songs 2013	
"Hanggang Kailan"	2014	Himig Handog P-Pop Love Songs 2014	

== Soundtrack appearances ==
List of media in which Angeline Quinto's songs have been used
Year	Film/series	Song(s)	Ref(s)
2011	Maria la del Barrio	"Patuloy ang Pangarap"	
2011	Minsan Lang Kita Iibigin	"Kunin Mo Na ang Lahat sa Akin"	
2011	Budoy	"Saan Darating ang Umaga"	
2011	Reputasyon	"Ngayon"	
2011	100 Days to Heaven	"Mahiwaga"	
2012	Mundo Man ay Magunaw	"Hulog ng Langit"	
2012	Princess and I	"Nag-iisang Bituin"	
2012	Dahil sa Pag-ibig	"Maghihintay Sa'yo"	
2012	Ina, Kapatid, Anak	"Ikaw Lamang"	
2012	Walang Hanggan	"Hanggang"	
2012	Kung Ako'y Iiwan Mo	"Kung Ako'y Iiwan Mo"	
2012	Unofficially Yours	"If You Asked Me To"	
2012	Born to Love You	"Fall in Love Again"	
2013	One More Try	"Without You"	
2013	Crazy Love	"Muling Magmamahal"	
2013	Muling Buksan ang Puso	"Dapat Ka Bang Mahalin"	
2013	Juan dela Cruz	"Sana'y Kapiling Ka"	
2013	Apoy sa Dagat	"Kailangan Kita"	
2013	Kahit Konting Pagtingin	"Kahit Konting Pagtingin"	
2014	Sana Bukas Pa ang Kahapon	"Umiiyak ang Puso"	
2014	The Legal Wife	"Hanggang Kailan Kita Mamahalin"	
2014	She's Dating the Gangster	"Till I Met You"	
2015	Inday Bote	"Nag-iisa Lang"	
2015	You're My Home	"You're My Home"	
2015	And I Love You So	"And I Love You So"	
2017	The Promise of Forever	"Hanggang May Kailanman"	
2021	Huwag Kang Mangamba	"Huwag Kang Mangamba"	
2022	The Broken Marriage Vow	"Walang Pagsisisi"	
2024	What's Wrong with Secretary Kim	"Mr. Right"	

== See also ==
- List of songs recorded by Angeline Quinto
- List of roles and awards of Angeline Quinto
