= List of roles and awards of Angeline Quinto =

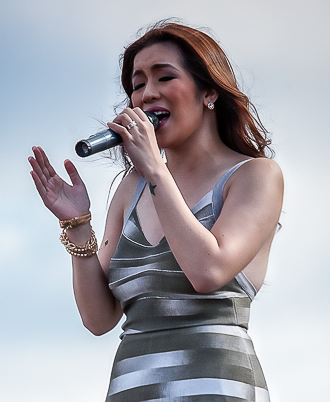
Quinto in 2014

Filipino singer and actress Angeline Quinto has received many awards and nominations for her work in music and on screen. She rose to prominence after winning the television talent show Star Power in 2011. She signed with Star Music and collaborated with songwriter and producer Jonathan Manalo for her self-titled debut studio album released that same year. Quinto won Best New Artist at the Aliw Awards for the album, and was a recipient of the Star Awards for New Female Recording Artist of the Year and Song of the Year for her debut single "Patuloy Ang Pangarap". In 2012, she released her second studio album Fall In Love Again, which earned her a Box Office Entertainment Award for Female Recording Artist of the Year. At the 26th Awit Awards, she won Best Song Written for a Movie/TV/Stage Play for the single "Nag-iisang Bituin", and Best Inspirational Recording for her collaboration with Regine Velasquez on "Lipad ng Pangarap".

The same year, Quinto made her television debut in an episode of the anthology series Maalaala Mo Kaya, for which she portrayed an Bagobo woman who falls in love with a man outside her tribe. She played her first leading role in a feature film in Jerome Pobocan's romantic comedy-drama Born to Love You (2012). Quinto's first starring role on television was in the romantic comedy series Kahit Konting Pagtingin (2013), playing a waitress who pretends to be her patron's fiancée. She won a Golden Screen TV Award for Breakthrough Performance by an Actress for the role. She followed this with supporting parts in Cathy Garcia-Molina's ensemble comedy Four Sisters and a Wedding and Joyce Bernal's romantic comedy Bakit Hindi Ka Crush ng Crush Mo?. In 2014, she released her third studio album Higher Love. For her work, she received four nominations at the 6th Star Awards for Music, winning Female Pop Artist of the Year.

Quinto co-headlined a concert, titled Royals, in February 2016. She won Best Collaboration in a Concert at the 29th Aliw Awards and Female Concert Performer of the Year at the 48th Box Office Entertainment Awards for the production. She had two film releases that year, including the independent film Malinak Ya Labi which premiered at the 2016 Cinema One Originals Film Festival. In 2017, she starred as a desperate woman determined to find companionship in Joel Lamangan's comedy drama Foolish Love. She had two television appearances that year, a guest role in the action drama series Ang Probinsyano and as a panelist in the music game show I Can See Your Voice. Quinto then released her fourth studio album @LoveAngelineQuinto (2017). It garnered her four nominations at the 2018 Star Awards for Music, including a win for Female Artist of the Year. Three years later, she co-starred in the drama series Huwag Kang Mangamba (2021). She has since appeared as a mentor in the reality talent show Dream Maker (2022).

== Filmography ==
=== Film ===
Angeline Quinto's film credits
Year	Title	Role	Notes	Ref(s)
2012	Born to Love You	Joey Liwanag		
2013	Four Sisters and a Wedding	Princess Antoinette Mae Bayag		
2013	Bakit Hindi Ka Crush ng Crush Mo?	Tangerine		
2014	Beauty in a Bottle	Judith Madamba		
2016	That Thing Called Tanga Na	Shirley		
2016	Malinak Ya Labi	Amanda		
2017	Foolish Love	Virginia Dimaculangan		
2023	Single Bells	Rose Mae		
2025	Ang happy homes ni Diane Hilario	Diane Hilario		
2026	Jack & Jill	Jack/Jackie Lou		

=== Television ===
Angeline Quinto's television credits with year of release, title(s) and role
Year	Title	Role	Notes	Ref(s)
2011	ASAP	Herself	Host	
2012	Maalaala Mo Kaya	Carina	Episode: "Gong"	
2012	Princess and I	Herself	Cameo	
2013	Wansapanataym	Melody	Episode: "Ang Bagong Kampeon sa Bagong Taon"	
2013	Kahit Konting Pagtingin	Aurora Natividad		
2013	Maalaala Mo Kaya	Ella	Episode: "Ang Tahanan Mo"	
2014	Maalaala Mo Kaya	Paula Jamie "PJ" Salvosa	Episode: "Train"	
2015	Nathaniel	Jessie	Guest role	
2016	Maalaala Mo Kaya	Malou	Episode: "Oblivious"	
2017	Maalaala Mo Kaya	Adelle	Episode: "Mesa"	
2017	I Can See Your Voice	Herself	Panelist	
2017	Ang Probinsyano	Regine "Jean" Moreno	Guest role	
2021	Tawag ng Tanghalan	Herself	Judge	
2021	Huwag Kang Mangamba	Darling Sanchez		
2021	Maalaala Mo Kaya	Rebecca Bustamante	Episode: "Bigas" and "Titulo"	
2022	Dream Maker	Herself	Mentor	
2024	What's Wrong with Secretary Kim	Sarah Angeles		

== Awards and nominations ==
Awards and nominations received by Angeline Quinto
Award	Year (Note: Indicates the year of ceremony. Each year is linked to the article about the awards held that year, wherever possible.)	Recipient(s) and nominee(s)	Category	Result	Ref(s)
Aliw Awards	2011	Angeline Quinto	Best New Artist	Won	
Aliw Awards	2014	In Love	Best Major Concert (Female)	Nominated	
Aliw Awards	2016	Royals	Best Collaboration in a Concert	Won	
Awit Awards	2013	"Saan Darating Ang Umaga"	Best Performance by a Female Recording Artist	Nominated	
Awit Awards	2013	"Lipad Ng Pangarap" (with Regine Velasquez)	Best Inspirational/Religious Recording	Won	
Awit Awards	2013	"Lipad Ng Pangarap" (with Regine Velasquez)	Best Collaboration	Nominated	
Awit Awards	2013	"Nag-iisang Bituin"	Best Song Written for Movie/TV/Stage Play	Won	
Awit Awards	2013	Angeline Quinto	Most Downloaded Artist	Won	
Awit Awards	2015	"May Bukas Pa" (with Lani Misalucha, KZ Tandingan, and Yeng Constantino)	Best Collaboration	Won	
Box Office Entertainment Awards	2012	Angeline Quinto	Female Recording Artist of the Year	Won	
Box Office Entertainment Awards	2017	Royals	Female Concert Performer of the Year	Won	
Catholic Mass Media Awards	2011	"Patuloy Ang Pangarap"	Best Secular Song	Won	
Golden Screen TV Awards	2014	Kahit Konting Pagtingin	Breakthrough Performance by an Actress	Won	
Star Awards for Music	2011	Angeline Quinto	New Female Recording Artist of the Year	Won	
Star Awards for Music	2011	"Patuloy Ang Pangarap"	Song of the Year	Won	
Star Awards for Music	2012	Angeline Quinto	Female Pop Artist of the Year	Won	
Star Awards for Music	2012	Angeline Quinto	Female Recording Artist of the Year	Nominated	
Star Awards for Music	2014	Angeline Quinto	Female Pop Artist of the Year	Won	
Star Awards for Music	2014	Angeline Quinto	Female Recording Artist of the Year	Nominated	
Star Awards for Music	2014	Higher Love	Pop Album of the Year	Nominated	
Star Awards for Music	2014	"Nag-iisa"	Song of the Year	Nominated	
Star Awards for Music	2016	Royals	Female Concert Performer of the Year	Nominated	
Star Awards for Music	2016	Royals	Concert of the Year	Nominated	
Star Awards for Music	2017	Angeline Quinto	Female Artist of the Year	Won	
Star Awards for Music	2017	Angeline Quinto	Female Recording Artist of the Year	Nominated	
Star Awards for Music	2017	@LoveAngelineQuinto	Pop Album of the Year	Nominated	
Star Awards for Music	2017	@LoveAngelineQuinto	Album Cover of the Year	Nominated	
Star Awards for Music	2017	Birit Queens	Female Concert Performer of the Year	Nominated	
Star Awards for Music	2017	Birit Queens	Concert of the Year	Won	
Star Awards for Music	2017	Divas: Live in Manila	Concert of the Year	Nominated	
Star Awards for Music	2023	Angeline Quinto	Female Recording Artist of the Year	Nominated	
Star Awards for Music	2023	"Huwag Kang Mangamba"	Inspirational Song of the Year	Won	
