= Jon Lucas (actor) =

Filipino actor (born 1995)

- Born: Aljhon Andres Lucas; August 18, 1995 (age 30)
- Education: Taytay United Methodist Christian School
- Occupation: Actor
- Years active: 2013–2017, 2019–present
- Agents: Star Magic (2013–2019); Sparkle GMA Artist Center (2019–present)
- Height: 5 ft 8 in (173 cm)

Aljhon Andres "Jon" Lucas (born August 18, 1995) is a Filipino actor who is known for appearing in Got to Believe (2013–14) and Black Rider (2023–24).

== Early life and education ==
Aljhon Andres Lucas was born on August 18, 1995. Lucas' father is a seller of eyeglasses while his mother is a housewife. He has a younger sister.

While he has Taytay, Rizal as his hometown, Lucas grew up in Manila. He attended Taytay United Methodist Christian School but dropped out to focus on his acting career.

== Career ==
Jon Lucas started his acting career when he auditioned for Star Magic in 2012 after his friends convinced him after participating in a pageant in 2010. He was included in the Star Magic Circle Batch 2013 becoming affiliated with ABS-CBN. He became known for his role as Dominic in Got to Believe and also appeared in Kahit Konting Pagtingin and Be Careful with My Heart

He made his debut in film in Saranghaeyo #ewankosau in 2015.

He also became the Hashtags dance group in It's Showtime but was believed to have gone on indefinite leave in October 2017. Showtime choreographer Mickey Perz said in May 2018 that he was suspended as disciplinary action concerning punctuality. Lucas admitted in July 2018, that he was indefinitely suspended after he conceived his first child with his now wife. He formally left Star Magic in June 2019.

Lucas then joined GMA Network signing a contract with the network in June 2019. However in mid-2023, Lucas considered going on a hiatus due to the lack of projects until he earned a place in Black Rider. In 2024, he won his first award in acting — the TV Supporting Actor of the Year trophy at the 5th VP Choice Awards He portrayed the antagonistic role of Calvin Magallanes who is a son of a syndicate leader.

== Personal life ==
Jon Lucas is a member of the Iglesia ni Cristo (INC). He is married to It's Showtime dance Shy Feras and has two children. He consults with the INC whenever he does antagonistic roles as an actor.

== Filmography ==
=== Films ===
| Year | Title | Role |
|---|---|---|
| 2015 | WalangForever | Gio |
| 2015 | Felix Manalo | Bienvenido Manalo |
| 2015 | Just The Way You Are | Ivan |
| 2015 | Saranghaeyo #ewankosau | River Mondragon |
| 2016 | I Love You to Death | Zandro |
| 2016 | Higanti | Francis |
| 2017 | Haunted Forest | Andre |
| 2017 | Bes and the Beshies | Gilbert |
| 2019 | Marineros: Men in the Middle of the Sea | |
| 2019 | Finding You | Bryan |
| 2020 | Block Z | Ivan |
| 2023 | Best Man | Dan |
| 2023 | Voltes V: Legacy – The Cinematic Experience | Ignacio |
| 2024 | Friendly Fire | Aero |

=== Television / Digital Series ===
| Year | Title | Role | Notes |
|---|---|---|---|
| 2013 | Kahit Konting Pagtingin | Eugene Cantada | |
| 2013 | Wansapanataym | Gary | Episode Guest: "Mommy On Duty" |
| 2013–2014 | Got to Believe | Dominic Zaragoza | Recurring Cast |
| 2013–2019 | ASAP | Himself / Performer | |
| 2014 | Maalaala Mo Kaya | Dandy | Episode Guest: "Orasan" |
| 2014 | Ipaglaban Mo | Edmond's Friend | Episode Guest: "Lalaban Ang Tatay Para Sa'Yo"; Credited as "Jon Lucas" |
| 2014 | Wansapanataym | Marvin | Episode Guest: "Witch-A-Makulit" (Parts 1 & 7) |
| 2014 | Sana Bukas pa ang Kahapon | Jester | |
| 2014 | Be Careful With My Heart | Michael | Guest Cast |
| 2014 | Home Sweetie Home | Luke | Recurring Cast |
| 2014 | Maalaala Mo Kaya | Joshua Palma | Episode Guest: "Nurse Cap" |
| 2015 | Luv U | Gardo | |
| 2015 | Kapamilya, Deal or No Deal | Himself - Lucky Stars (No. 5) | |
| 2015 | Ipaglaban Mo | Tupi | Episode Guest: "Ang Bintang Mo Sa Akin" |
| 2015 | Maalaala Mo Kaya | RJ | Episode Guest: "Computer Shop" |
| 2015 | Ipaglaban Mo | Joaquin's Cousin | Episode Guest: "Kapalit ng Pag-ibig" |
| 2015 | Maalaala Mo Kaya | Thomas | Episode Guest: "Banana Split" |
| 2015–2018 | It's Showtime | Himself / Hashtag Member | |
| 2016 | We Will Survive | Harold Briones | |
| 2016 | Maalaala Mo Kaya | Younger Jack | Episode Guest: "Gitara" |
| 2016 | Maalaala Mo Kaya | Eric | Episode Guest: "Halo-Halo" |
| 2017, 2022 | FPJ's Ang Probinsyano (season 3 & 9) | Younger Renato Hipolito | Special Participation |
| 2018 | Maalaala Mo Kaya | Mark | Episode Guest: "Bibliya" |
| 2018 | Maalaala Mo Kaya | Pipit | Episode Guest: "Skateboard" |
| 2018 | Ipaglaban Mo | Vince | Episode Guest: "Diploma" |
| 2018 | Ipaglaban Mo | Tonyo | Episode Guest: "Sumpaan" |
| 2019 | Maalaala Mo Kaya | Jun Manzo | Episode Guest: "Jersey" |
| 2019 | Ipaglaban Mo | Miguel | Episode Guest: "Ingrata" |
| 2019 | Dear Uge | Vince | Episode Guest: "Mid Life Tsismis" |
| 2020 | Tagisan Ng Galing: Part 2 | Host | |
| 2020 | Dear Uge | Cloyd | Episode Guest: "Sistering" |
| 2020 | Descendants of the Sun | Staff Sergeant Benjo Tamayo | |
| 2020 | Pepito Manaloto | Lorenzo | Episode Guest: "Pagod" |
| 2020 | Tadhana | Ramil | Episode Guest: "Hindi pa huli ang umibig" (Parts 1 & 2) |
| 2021 | First Yaya | Titus De Villa | Antagonist |
| 2021 | Wish Ko Lang! | | Episode Guest: "Killer Yaya" |
| 2021 | Pepito Manaloto (Ang Unang Kuwento) | Jason | Episode Guest: "Pugo" |
| 2021 | Daig Kayo ng Lola Ko | Alex | Episode Guest: "Oh My Oppa" (New Boyfie, Meet Up) (Confession, True Love) |
| 2022 | Magpakailanman | Erwin | Episode Guest: "Liwanag ng Bituin" |
| 2022 | Wish Ko Lang! | | Episode Guest: "Babaeng Kandila" |
| 2022 | First Lady | Titus De Villa | |
| 2022 | Tadhana | Rommel | Episode Guest: "The Wedding" |
| 2022 | Magpakailanman | Marlon | Episode Guest: "Ampon man sa iyong paningin" |
| 2022 | Tadhana | Tristan | Episode Guest: "Heredera" (Parts 1 & 2) |
| 2022 | Abot-Kamay na Pangarap | Timothy "Tim" Campos | |
| 2022 | Magpakailanman | Lyndon | Episode Guest: "Listen to My Heart" (Part 1 & 2) |
| 2023 | Voltes V: Legacy | RS Ignacio | |
| 2023 | Hearts on Ice | Younger Gerald | |
| 2023 | Maria Clara at Ibarra | Juanito Pelaez | |
| 2023 | Pepito Manaloto (Tuloy ang kuwento) | David Ortega | Episode Guest: "VIP" |
| 2023 | Tadhana | Meynard | Episode Guest: "Reunion" (Parts 1 & 3) |
| 2023 | Magpakailanman | Andres | Episode Guest: "Almost A Champion" |
| 2023 | Pinoy Crime Stories | Matnog | Episode Guest: "Bata sa sako" |
| 2023–2024 | Black Rider | Calvin Yuzon-Valmoria† (Don Alejandro's Grandson) | |
| 2024 | Magpakailanman | Michael | Episode Guest: "Abused, and Raped" |
| 2024 | Lilet Matias: Attorney-at-Law | Kenneth Briones | |
| 2024 | Regal Studio Presents | Omar | Episode Guest: "Stuck on You" |
| 2024 | Tadhana | Kenny | Episode Guest: "Sino Si Alice?" (Parts 1 & 3) |
| 2024 | Wish Ko Lang! | Jomar | Episode Guest: "Ang Kabit Ni Mister, at kay Misis" |
| 2024–2025 | Walang Matigas na Pulis sa Matinik na Misis | | |
| 2025 | Lolong: Bayani ng Bayan | Lizardo | |
| 2025 | Slay | Byron Alvarez† | |
| 2025 | Maka | Tristan | Episode Guest: "Chanty / Paubaya" |
| 2025 | Encantadia Chronicles: Sang'gre | Daron | |
| 2025 | Wish Ko Lang! | Tonyo | Episode Guest: "Tunay Na Ganda" |
| 2026 | Regal Studio Presents | Emman | Episode: "Mister Perfect Model Guy" |
