= List of songs recorded by Angeline Quinto =

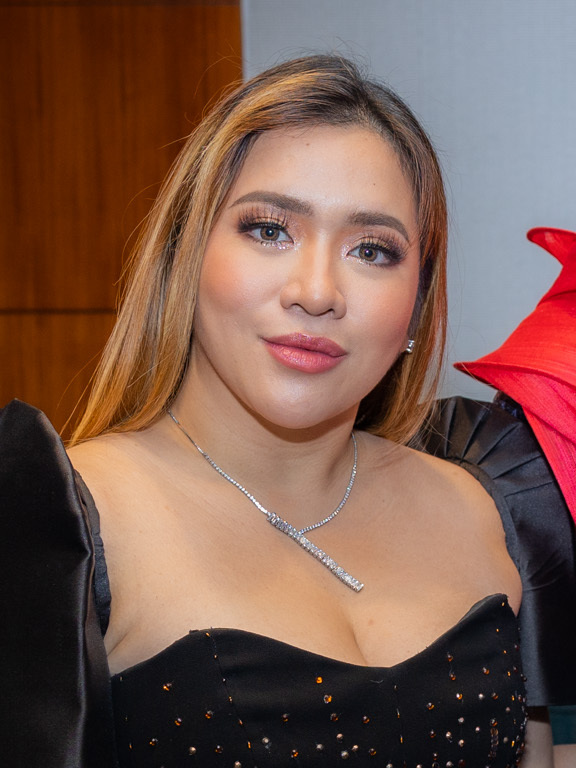
Quinto in 2023

Filipino singer Angeline Quinto has recorded material for four studio albums and one soundtrack album. She has also collaborated with other artists on duets and featured on songs on their albums. After winning the television talent show Star Power in 2011, Quinto signed a record deal with Star Music and began to work with the songwriter and producer Jonathan Manalo for her self-titled debut studio album. The coronation single, "Patuloy Ang Pangarap", was written by Manalo and later released as the album's lead single. She continued to collaborate with Manalo on her second studio album, Fall in Love Again, which was released in 2012. It also featured a cover of Patti LaBelle's 1989 song "If You Asked Me To" as a duet with Erik Santos.

Quinto recorded the love ballad "One Day", which Agatha Morallos wrote for her to perform at the 2013 Himig Handog P-Pop Love Songs competition. The following year, she released her third studio album, Higher Love (2014), for which she co-wrote the lead single "Sana2x". She then recorded all the songs for the soundtrack of the revenge drama series Sana Bukas pa ang Kahapon, which was released in June 2014. It contained covers of Filipino songs written by George Canseco, Louie Ocampo, April Boy Regino, Vehnee Saturno, and Nyoy Volante. Quinto returned as a song interpreter at the 2014 Himig Handog P-Pop Love Songs, and featured in Jose Joel Mendoza's composition entitled "Hanggang Kailan".

A duet with Michael Pangilinan, "Parang Tayo Pero Hindi", was written by Marlon Barnuevo for the 2016 Himig Handog P-Pop Love Songs. It was later included on Quinto's fourth studio album, @LoveAngelineQuinto, which was released in January 2017. She received writing credits for the lead single "Para Bang, Para Lang", while Yeng Constantino wrote the tracks "Di Na Tayo" and "At Ang Hirap". She also recorded cover versions of boy band Jeremiah's "Nanghihinayang" and Ogie Alcasid's "Kailangan Kita". In addition, Quinto has contributed songs to 35 film and television soundtracks.

== Songs ==
Key
†	Indicates single release
#	Indicates promotional single release

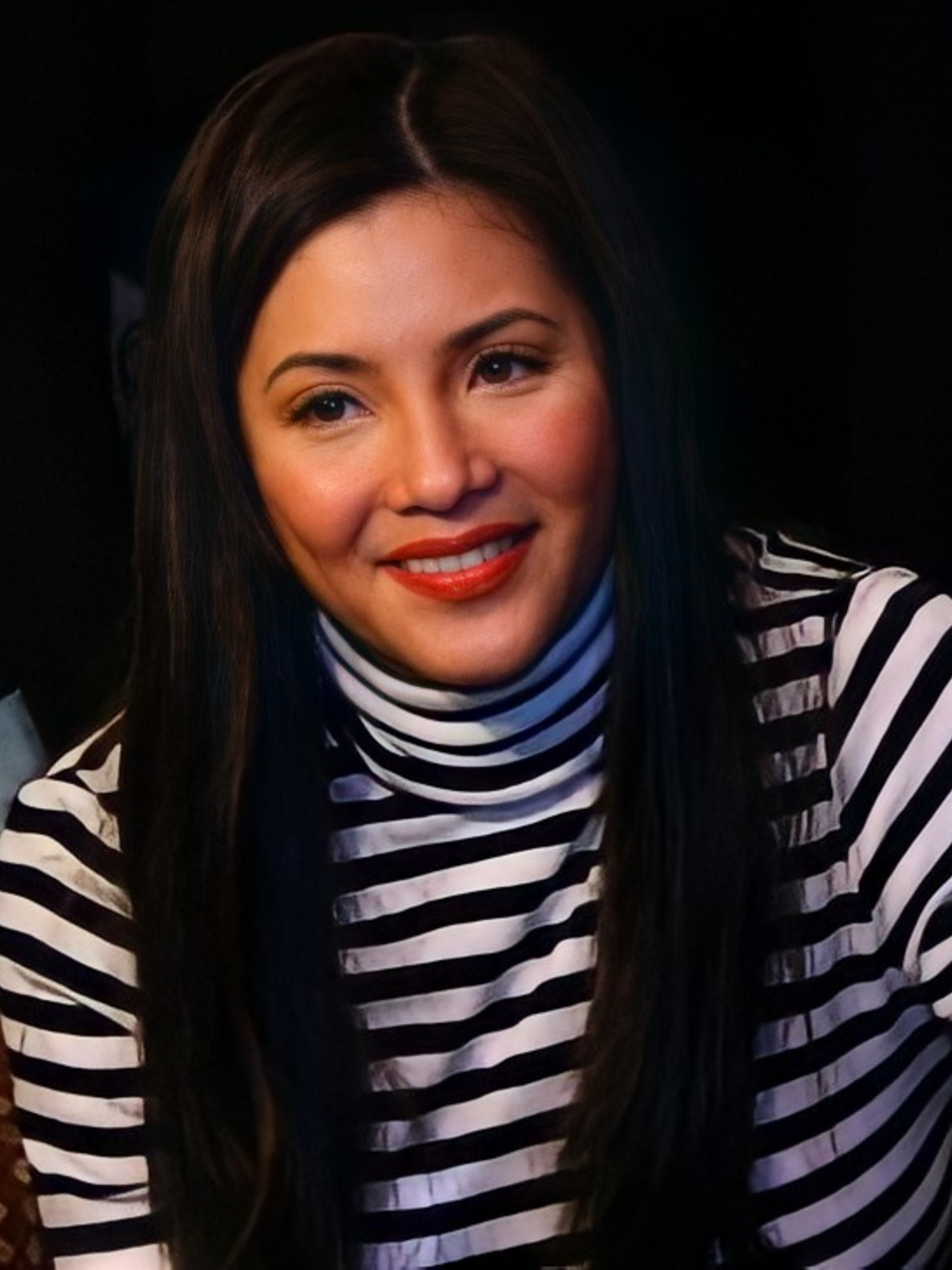
Regine Velasquez and Quinto recorded a cover of "Lipad ng Pangarap".

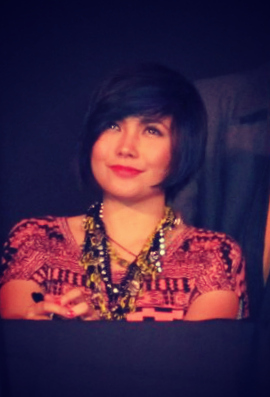
Yeng Constantino wrote "Di Na Tayo" and "At ang Hirap".

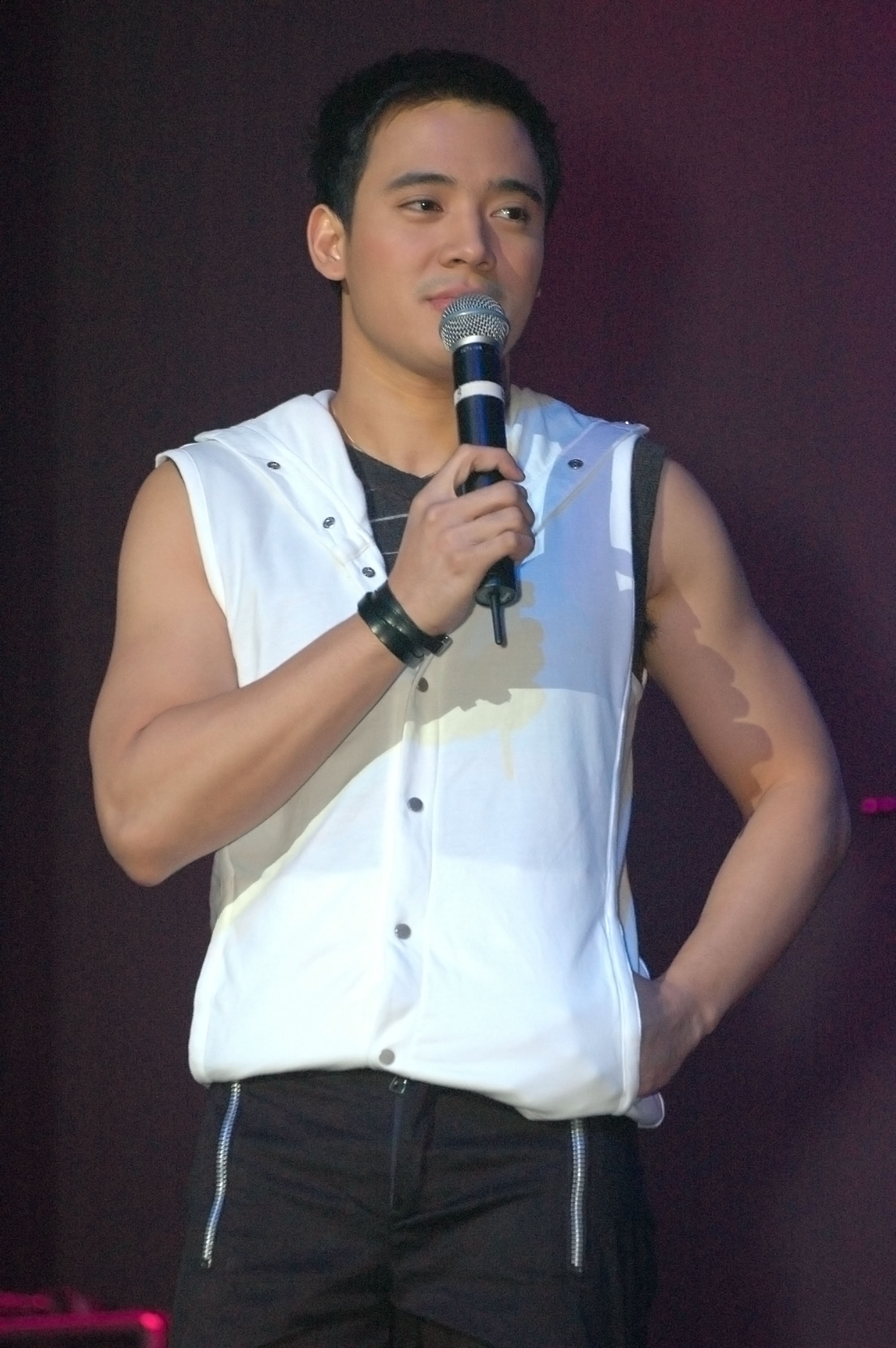
Erik Santos and Quinto collaborated on covers of "If You Asked Me To" (1989) and "This I Promise You" (2000).

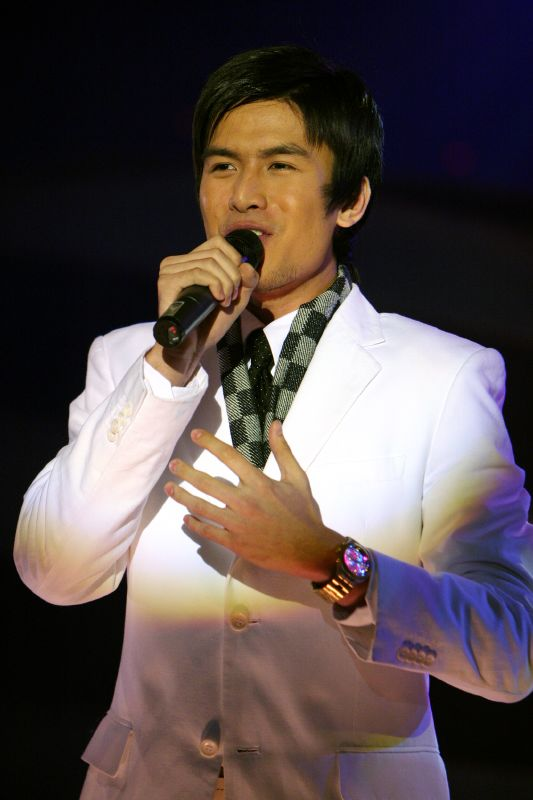
Christian Bautista and Quinto recorded a cover of Jacky Cheung and Regine Velasquez's "In Love with You".

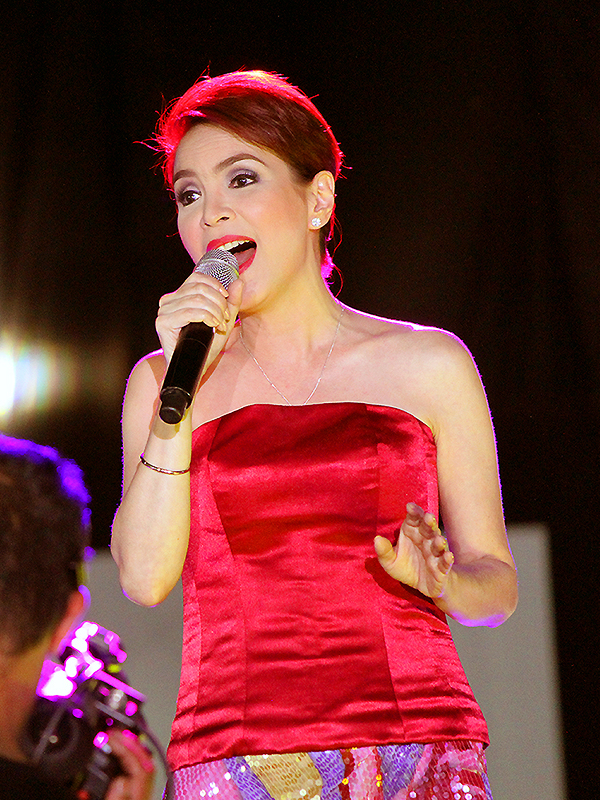
Quinto featured on Jamie Rivera's compilation album and recorded a cover of "Kay Palad Mo".

Name of song, credited artist(s), writer(s), originating album, and year of release
Song	Artist(s)	Writer(s)	Album	Year	Ref.
"Aking Pagmamahal" †	Angeline Quinto (featuring LADZKIE)	Jyzzyl Taladoc	None (Note: "Aking Pagmamahal" was digitally released as a non-album single in 2023.)	2023	
"Ako Na Lang"	Angeline Quinto	Joven Tan	Higher Love	2013	
"And I Love You So" #	Angeline Quinto	Don McLean	None (Note: Quinto recorded "And I Love You So" as the main theme song for the television series And I Love You So in 2015.)	2015	
"Ang Pag-ibig Ko’y Ikaw"	Angeline Quinto	Dodjie Simon	@LoveAngelineQuinto	2017	
"At ang Hirap" †	Angeline Quinto	Yeng Constantino	@LoveAngelineQuinto	2017	
"Awit ng Pag-ibig"	Angeline Quinto	Rico Gonzales; Rox Santos	@LoveAngelineQuinto	2017	
"Babalikang Muli"	Angeline Quinto	Goro Matsui; Kenjirou Sakiya; Larry Chua	Higher Love	2013	
"Bakit Ba Minamahal Kita" †	Angeline Quinto	Jonathan Manalo	Fall in Love Again	2012	
"Bring Back the Times"	Angeline Quinto	Eunice Saldaña	Higher Love	2013	
"Dapat Ka Bang Mahalin" #	Angeline Quinto	George Canseco	None (Note: Quinto recorded "Dapat Ka Bang Mahalin" as the main theme song for the television series Muling Buksan ang Puso in 2013.)	2013	
"Di Na Tayo" †	Angeline Quinto	Yeng Constantino	@LoveAngelineQuinto	2017	
"Fall in Love Again" †	Angeline Quinto	Steve Dorff; Larry Herbstritt; Gloria Sklerov; Harry Lloyd	Fall in Love Again	2012	
"Forever"	Angeline Quinto	Louie Ocampo; Martin Nievera	Sana Bukas Pa ang Kahapon	2014	
"Gusto Kita"	Angeline Quinto	Boedi Bachtiar; Snaffu Rigor	Sana Bukas Pa ang Kahapon	2014	
"Hanggang" # (Note: "Hanggang" was promotionally released as the main theme song for the television series Walang Hanggan in 2012.)	Angeline Quinto	Gigi Cordero; Roni Cordero	Fall in Love Again	2012	
"Hanggang Kailan" #	Angeline Quinto	Jose Joel Mendoza	None (Note: Quinto recorded "Hanggang Kailan" for the 2014 Himig Handog P-Pop Love Songs competition.)	2014	
"Hanggang Kailan Kita Mamahalin"	Angeline Quinto	Willy Cruz	Higher Love	2013	
"Hanggang May Kailanman" #	Angeline Quinto	Jungee Marcelo; Soc Villanueva	None (Note: Quinto recorded "Hanggang May Kailanman" as the main theme song for the television series The Promise of Forever in 2017.)	2017	
"Higher Love"	Angeline Quinto	Jonathan Manalo	Higher Love	2013	
"Hindi Ko Kaya"	Angeline Quinto	Aaron Paul Del Rosario	Sana Bukas Pa ang Kahapon	2014	
"Hulog ng Langit" # (Note: "Hulog ng Langit" was promotionally released as the main theme song for the television series Mundo Man ay Magunaw in 2012.)	Angeline Quinto	Vehnee Saturno	Fall in Love Again	2012	
"If You Asked Me To" # (Note: "If You Asked Me To" was promotionally released as the main theme song for the film Unofficially Yours in 2012.)	Angeline Quinto and Erik Santos	Dianne Warren	Fall in Love Again	2012	
"Ikaw ang Aking Mundo"	Angeline Quinto	Roque Santos	Higher Love	2013	
"Ikaw Lamang" #	Angeline Quinto	Dodjie Simon	None (Note: Quinto recorded "Ikaw Lamang" as the main theme song for the television series Ina, Kapatid, Anak in 2012.)	2013	
"In Love with You" †	Christian Bautista and Angeline Quinto	J. Edward Laudon	First Class Outbound	2012	
"Kahit Konting Pagtingin" #	Angeline Quinto	Levi Celerio	None (Note: Quinto recorded "Kahit Konting Pagtingin" as the main theme song for the television series of the same name in 2013.)	2013	
"Kailangan Kita"	Angeline Quinto	Ogie Alcasid	@LoveAngelineQuinto	2017	
"Kay Palad Mo"	Angeline Quinto	Jamie Rivera; Jimmy Antiporda	Hey It's Me, Jamie	2017	
"Kung Ako'y Iiwan Mo" # (Note: "Kung Ako'y Iiwan Mo" was promotionally released as the main theme song for the television series Kung Ako'y Iiwan Mo in 2012.)	Angeline Quinto	George Canseco	Fall in Love Again	2012	
"Kung Sakali Man"	Angeline Quinto	Dannica Christy Reyes; Roland Azor	Higher Love	2013	
"Kunin Mo Na ang Lahat sa Akin" †	Angeline Quinto	Jose Larry Hermoso	Angeline Quinto: Patuloy ang Pangarap	2011	
"Lipad ng Pangarap" †	Angeline Quinto and Regine Velasquez	Arnel De Pano	Fall in Love Again	2012	
"Maghihintay Sa 'Yo" # (Note: "Maghihintay Sa 'Yo" was promotionally released as the main theme song for the television series Dahil sa Pag-ibig in 2012.)	Angeline Quinto	Dingdong Avanzado	Fall in Love Again	2012	
"Mahiwaga"	Angeline Quinto	Dominador Torres; Manuel Villar	Angeline Quinto: Patuloy ang Pangarap	2011	
"Muli"	Angeline Quinto	Freddie Saturno; Vehnee Saturno	Sana Bukas Pa ang Kahapon	2014	
"Muling Magmahal"	Angeline Quinto	Jonathan Manalo; Cynthia Roque	Angeline Quinto	2011	
"Nag-Iisang Bituin" # (Note: "Nag-Iisang Bituin" was promotionally released as the main theme song for the television series Princess and I in 2012.)	Angeline Quinto	Biv De Vera; Raizo Chabeldin	Fall in Love Again	2012	
"Nag-Iisa Lang" †	Angeline Quinto	Jonathan Manalo; Robert Labayen	Higher Love	2013	
"Nanghihinayang" †	Angeline Quinto	Larry Hermoso	@LoveAngelineQuinto	2017	
"Ngayon"	Angeline Quinto	George Canseco	Angeline Quinto: Patuloy ang Pangarap	2011	
"One Day" #	Angeline Quinto	Agatha Morallos	None (Note: Quinto recorded "One Day" for the 2013 Himig Handog P-Pop Love Songs competition.)	2013	
"Paalam Na" †	Dingdong Avanzado (featuring Angeline Quinto)	Dingdong Avanzado; Rachel Alejandro	20/30	2018	
"Paano Ba ang Huwag Kang Mahalin"	Angeline Quinto	Darla Sauler; Jonathan Manalo	@LoveAngelineQuinto	2017	
"Panghabang Panahon"	Angeline Quinto	Marizen Yaneza-Soriano	Angeline Quinto	2011	
"Para Bang, Para Lang" †	Angeline Quinto	Angeline Quinto; Jonathan Manalo	@LoveAngelineQuinto	2017	
"Parang Langit" †	Daryl Ong (featuring Angeline Quinto)	Vehnee Saturno	Daryl Ong	2016	
"Parang Tayo Pero Hindi" †	Angeline Quinto and Michael Pangilinan	Marlon Barnuevo	@LoveAngelineQuinto	2017	
"Patuloy ang Pangarap" †	Angeline Quinto	Jonathan Manalo	Angeline Quinto	2011	
"Piliin Mo ang Pilipinas" #	Angeline Quinto	Allan Dannug; Robert Labayen	None (Note: "Piliin Mo ang Pilipinas" was digitally released as a non-album single in 2011.)	2011	
"Saan Darating ang Umaga" # (Note: "Saan Darating ang Umaga" was promotionally released as the main theme song for the television series Budoy in 2011.)	Angeline Quinto	George Canseco	Fall in Love Again	2012	
"Sana2x" †	Angeline Quinto	Angeline Quinto; Jonathan Manalo	Higher Love	2013	
"Sana Bukas Pa ang Kahapon" †	Angeline Quinto	George Canseco	Sana Bukas Pa ang Kahapon	2014	
"Sana'y Kapiling Ka" #	Angeline Quinto	Vehnee Saturno	None (Note: Quinto recorded "Sana'y Kapiling Ka" as the main theme song for the television series Juan dela Cruz in 2013.)	2013	
"Sino Ako Sa 'Yo"	Angeline Quinto	Christian Martinez	Higher Love	2013	
"Someday"	Angeline Quinto	Nyoy Volante	Sana Bukas Pa ang Kahapon	2014	
"Tanging Ikaw"	Angeline Quinto	Jonathan Manalo; Roque Santos	Fall in Love Again	2012	
"This I Promise You" †	Erik Santos (featuring Angeline Quinto)	Richard Marx	Champion Reborn	2015	
"Till I Met You" #	Angeline Quinto	Odette Quesada	None (Note: Quinto recorded "Till I Met You" as the main theme song for the film She's Dating the Gangster in 2014.)	2014	
"Umiiyak ang Puso" †	Angeline Quinto	April Boy Regino	Sana Bukas Pa ang Kahapon	2014	
"Wag Mo Akong Iwan Mag Isa"	Angeline Quinto	Socrates Villanueva	Angeline Quinto	2011	
"Walang Pagsisisi" #	Angeline Quinto	Jonathan Manalo; Rox Santos	None (Note: Quinto recorded "Walang Pagsisisi" as the theme song for the television series The Broken Marriage Vow in 2022.)	2022	
"Wherever You Are"	Angeline Quinto	Vince Alaras	Sana Bukas Pa ang Kahapon	2014	
"Why Can't It Be"	Angeline Quinto	Rannie Raymundo	Sana Bukas Pa ang Kahapon	2014	
"Without You" #	Angeline Quinto	Louie Ocampo	None (Note: Quinto recorded "Without You" as the main theme song for the film One More Try in 2012.)	2012	
"You Light Up My Life"	Angeline Quinto	Joseph Brooks	Fall in Love Again	2012	
"You're My Home"	Angeline Quinto	Odette Quesada	Angeline Quinto: Patuloy ang Pangarap	2011	
