= Angeline Quinto =

Filipino singer and actress (born 1989)

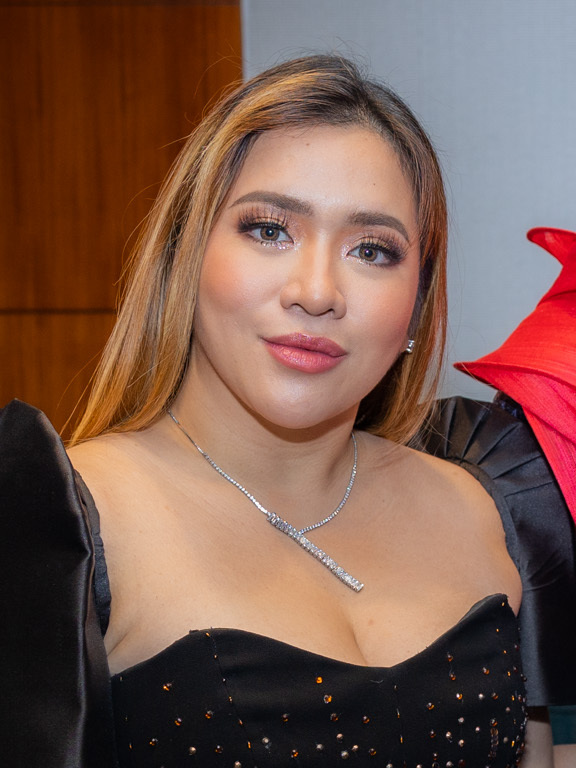
- Quinto in 2023
- Born: November 26, 1989 (age 36); Sampaloc, Manila, Philippines
- Education: Immaculada Concepcion College (BSBA)
- Occupations: Singer; actress
- Years active: 2010–present
- Works: Discography; roles and awards; songs
- Spouse: Nonrev Daquina (m. 2024)
- Children: 2
- Musical career
- Genres: OPM; pop
- Instrument: Vocals
- Labels: Star Music (2011–2024, 2026-present); Universal Records (2024–2026)

Angeline Quinto (Tagalog pronunciation: [ˈkɪntɔʔ]; born November 26, 1989) is a Filipino singer, actress, and television personality. Known for her vocal range and soulful singing style, Quinto's music has garnered critical praise for its lyrical content and themes of love, heartbreak, and empowerment. It has been featured in the soundtracks of films and television series in the Philippines.

Born in Sampaloc, Manila, Quinto first achieved recognition after winning the television talent show Star Power in 2011. She signed with Star Music and collaborated with songwriter and producer Jonathan Manalo to start recording material for her first effort, a self-titled studio album, which was supported by the single "Patuloy Ang Pangarap" ("The Dream Continues"). The album was certified double platinum by the Philippine Association of the Record Industry, and earned Quinto an Aliw Award for Best New Artist. Her next album, Fall In Love Again (2012), featured theme songs from films and television series. With Sana Bukas pa ang Kahapon (2014), Quinto became the first Filipino artist to record all the songs for a television show soundtrack. She reinvented her image and style with succeeding releases, Higher Love (2013) and @LoveAngelineQuinto (2017), gaining praise for her artistic growth and maturity.

Quinto made her feature film debut with a starring role in the romantic comedy Born to Love You (2012). She then played the lead in the drama series Kahit Konting Pagtingin (2013), winning a Golden Screen TV Award for Breakthrough Performance by an Actress. She received further acclaim for collaborations with filmmaker Joel Lamangan, the ensemble comedy That Thing Called Tanga Na (2016) and the comedy drama Foolish Love (2017). Quinto expanded her career into reality television as a panelist in the music game show I Can See Your Voice (2017) and as a mentor in the talent competition show Dream Maker (2022). Her accolades include four Awit Awards, two Aliw Awards, two Box Office Entertainment Awards, and seven Star Awards for Music.

== Life and career ==
=== 1989–2009: Early life and Star for a Night ===
Angeline Quinto was born on November 26, 1989, to Pop Quiros and Rosemarie Susan Mabao. She was adopted by her paternal grandaunt, Sylvia "Bob" Quinto, in Sampaloc, Manila, In an interview, Quinto said that Bob prevented Susan from aborting her during her pregnancy when it interfered with her plans to work in Japan and later adopted Angeline in exchange for ₱10,000 amid a marital dispute. Initially resentful during her early childhood, Quinto later shared a close bond with her adoptive mother and credited her as instrumental to her achievements. Quinto began singing at age six. She listened to songs on the radio and would imitate the singing styles of female artists. At age nine, she participated in her first amateur singing competition.

The next few years, Quinto continued to compete in talent shows on television. At age twelve, she auditioned for the first season of the reality singing contest Star for a Night (2003). She advanced as one of the eleven grand finalists, and performed a cover of Wency Cornejo's "Habang May Buhay" ("As Long as There is Life") during the season finals. Quinto later recalled that her participation in the show was motivated by a desire to meet the program's host, Regine Velasquez, whom she considers as a musical influence. In 2005, she appeared in Magandang Tanghali Bayan's Teen Pop Star search and became that season's winner. During this period, Quinto suffered from depression and thought of self-harm. She struggled academically in high school and was negatively influenced by her peers, eventually dropping out of school. Her family was beset by personal disagreements, which led her to take a break from singing to focus on her mental health.

=== 2010–2012: Star Power and acting debut ===
After a five-year break from music, Quinto pursued singing and was part of a talent show in the variety program Diz Iz It! in 2010. A renewed interest led her to audition for the reality television series Star Power: Sharon's Search for the Next Female Pop Superstar that same year. During her appearances on the series, she was a senior in high school. Quinto won the competition on February 20, 2011, at the Ynares Center in Antipolo. Looking back on Star Power in a 2019 interview, Quinto remarked that she considered the show her last effort towards working on her music career. Worried that she would remain obscure at the time, she contemplated pursuing a career in the culinary arts.

After winning Star Power, Quinto was signed to a record deal with Star Music. She began working on her eponymous debut album with songwriter and producer Jonathan Manalo, to whom she felt deeply indebted. Manalo wrote two of the album's songs, including the debut single "Patuloy Ang Pangarap" ("The Dream Continues"), which Quinto performed during the season finale of Star Power. He took inspiration from the singer's life story and described the song as a "quest [for her] ultimate dreams". Angeline Quinto was released on March 16, 2011. The album received a double platinum certification from the Philippine Association of the Record Industry. Quinto won multiple accolades for the album; she received the Aliw Award for Best New Artist in 2011, and won New Female Recording Artist of the Year and Song of the Year for "Patuloy Ang Pangarap" ("The Dream Continues") at the 2011 Star Awards for Music. That same year, she released a repackaged edition of the album, titled Angeline Quinto: Patuloy Ang Pangarap.

Quinto's second studio album, Fall in Love Again, was released on March 25, 2012. She worked with Manalo for its lead single "Bakit Ba Minamahal Kita". It included a cover of Celine Dion's "If You Asked Me To", a duet with Erik Santos for the soundtrack of the romantic comedy film Unofficially Yours (2012). Other singles from the album were also released as soundtracks for television shows: "Saan Darating ang Umaga" ("Where Morning Will Come") for the drama series Budoy, "Hanggang" ("Until) for the romantic drama series Walang Hanggan, "Nag-iisang Bituin" ("Only Star") for the teen drama series Princess and I, and "Kung Ako'y Iiwan Mo" ("If You Leave Me") for the ensemble series of the same name. At the 26th Awit Awards, Quinto won Best Song Written for Movie/TV/Stage Play for "Nag-iisang Bituin" ("Only Star"), and Best Inspirational Recording for her collaboration with Velasquez on "Lipad ng Pangarap" ("Dreams Take Flight").

Quinto was initially reluctant to venture into acting and cited that she lacked experience. She underwent workshops from Star Cinema executive Malou Santos and trained with actors, including Pen Medina. She made her feature film debut with a lead role in Jerome Pobocan's romantic comedy-drama Born to Love You (2012), co-starring Coco Martin. The film tells the story of two strangers, whose lives are transformed despite their contrasting personalities. Nestor Torre Jr. of the Philippine Daily Inquirer found her to be "expressive", but felt that her performance "fell short of the standards". Media critic Mark Ching from the Philippine Entertainment Portal wrote that the film was well-written and well-acted, and noted that Quinto's "personal charm and naivete" aided in her genuine portrayal. In her television debut, an episode of the anthology series Maalaala Mo Kaya, she was cast as an indigenous woman and the love interest of Jason Abalos's character.

=== 2013–2016: Kahit Konting Pagtingin and Higher Love ===
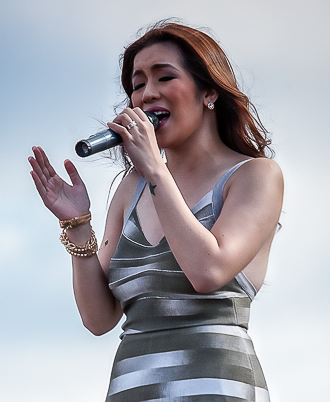
Quinto performing in London during the 2014 Barrio Fiesta

In 2013, Quinto starred in the romantic comedy series Kahit Konting Pagtingin. She played Aurora Natividad, a waitress who pretends to be the fiancée of her patron, played by Ahron Villena, and ends up endeared by his brothers, portrayed by Paulo Avelino and Sam Milby. The series aired from January 21 to April 12, 2013. She won a Golden Screen TV Award for Breakthrough Performance by an Actress for the part. She followed this with supporting roles in Cathy Garcia-Molina's ensemble comedy Four Sisters and a Wedding and Joyce Bernal's romantic comedy Bakit Hindi Ka Crush ng Crush Mo? At the 2013 Himig Handog P-Pop Love Songs, Quinto was one of the finalists in the songwriting competition, performing the Agatha Morallos-penned love ballad "One Day".

Quinto reunited with longtime collaborator Jonathan Manalo for her third studio album, Higher Love, released on January 15, 2014. She reinvented her image and style, which she asserted was an improvement "creatively and visually". She wrote the album's lead single "Sana2x" ("Hopefully") and described Higher Love as a narrative of "love's many stages". The Philippine Daily Inquirer critic Joseph Atilano deemed the album a "proper third outing", concentrating praise on Quinto's maturity. Five months later, Quinto recorded all the songs for the soundtrack of the revenge drama series Sana Bukas Pa ang Kahapon, which was released on June 30, 2014. She returned as a song interpreter at the 2014 Himig Handog P-Pop Love Songs. Her final role of the year was opposite Angelica Panganiban and Assunta de Rossi in the satirical comedy Beauty in a Bottle. Reviewers for The Philippine Star termed the film "deceptively funny" and praised Quinto's comedic delivery. In June 2015, she appeared as a guest performer on the family drama Nathaniel. She then co-headlined a concert with Erik Santos at the Araneta Coliseum on August 15, 2015.

Royals was a co-headlining concert with Velasquez, Santos, and Martin Nievera at the Mall of Asia Arena on February 13, 2016. For the production, Quinto was named Female Concert Performer of the Year at the 48th Box Office Entertainment Awards. She appeared in two film releases in 2016. Quinto was the female lead in Joel Lamangan's That Thing Called Tanga Na, an ensemble comedy centering on friendship among a group of gay men. Mari-An Santos of the Philippine Entertainment Portal took note of Quinto's versatility, and likened her ability and range to that of Maricel Soriano. Rappler's Oggs Cruz felt the film was "dull, plain, and painfully redundant", but praised the cast's performances. Set in Pangasinan, the Jose Abdel Langit-directed independent thriller Malinak Ya Labi starred Quinto and Allen Dizon. A native of the province, she was drawn to the idea of doing an indie film, and agreed to the project for its use of dialogues in the local dialect. The film was screened at the 2016 Cinema One Originals Film Festival.

=== 2017–present: I Can See Your Voice and 10Q ===
Quinto recorded her fourth studio album, @LoveAngelineQuinto in the second half of 2016, and the album was officially released on January 26, 2017. Besides Jonathan Manalo, she worked with new producers and songwriters, including Yeng Constantino and Marlon Barnuevo. She received writing credits for one of the tracks "Para Bang, Para Lang" ("It's Like, It's Just"). The Philippine Daily Inquirer opined that the album emphasized Quinto's "subtlety" and grown-up perspectives. Quinto worked with Joel Lamangan for the second time on the romantic comedy-drama Foolish Love (2017), in which she played a woman desperate to find companionship. Portraying a single and independent persona, she has said that certain aspects of her character's life mirrored her own. Isah Red of the Manila Standard wrote, "[Quinto] has evolved into a daring performer who met the demands of her character without reservations." Pablo Tariman of The Philippine Star labelled the film "light and breezy", and lauded Quinto's inherently spontaneous performance. She then served as one of the main panelists on the first season of the music game show I Can See Your Voice, based on the original South Korean show. In November 2017, Quinto had a guest role in the action drama series Ang Probinsyano. The following year, she collaborated with Kyla, KZ Tandingan, and Yeng Constantino for a concert with American vocal harmony group Boyz II Men at the Araneta Coliseum. Quinto then returned as a panelist on the second season of I Can See Your Voice in August 2019.

After a two-year absence on screen, Quinto appeared in three productions in 2021. She took on a supporting role in the drama series Huwag Kang Mangamba co-starring Eula Valdez, Sylvia Sanchez, and Nonie Buencamino. As well as acting, she recorded the main theme song of the show, which won a Star Award for Music for Inspirational Song of the Year. She also became a judge on the amateur singing contest Tawag ng Tanghalan, which aired as a segment in the variety show It's Showtime. From October 29, 2021, to February 19, 2022, Quinto produced and headlined a ten-date livestreaming concert series, titled 10Q, which was filmed at the Metropolitan Theater in Manila. A celebration of her ten-year career milestone, the shows were broadcast via the web-based platforms KTX.ph, iWantTFC and TFC IPTV. Alwin Ignacio, writing for the Manila Standard, appreciated Quinto's artistic growth and commended the "emotional commitment and truthfulness" of her performances. In November 2022, she served as a mentor in the reality talent show Dream Maker. Quinto starred alongside Alex Gonzaga in the comedy film Single Bells, which premiered at the Metro Manila Summer Film Festival in April 2023. The following year, she co-starred with Kim Chiu and Paulo Avelino in the comedy series remake What's Wrong with Secretary Kim (2024). Later in August 2026, Quinto appeared as a guest contestant in the ABS-CBN game show Kapamilya Deal or No Deal; earlier into the second round, she knocked out the ₱1 million top prize which was held by content creators Abdul & Marsy (who won the ₱1 million top prize an episode prior); ultimately, she kept her briefcase till the end, and left with ₱500 for her charity.

== Artistry ==
=== Influences ===
Quinto has named Regine Velasquez as her idol and biggest musical influence. In 2002, she joined the talent show Star for a Night, hosted by Velasquez, and said the latter inspired her to pursue a musical career. She said that Velasquez was an inspiration, primarily on her earlier work, and to whom she had often been compared. "My career is basically built upon being a fan of Miss Regine", Quinto said. She set up a shrine in her home dedicated to the singer and has covered Velasquez's versions of "What Kind of Fool Am I?" and "I Don't Want to Miss a Thing" as contest pieces during the finale of Star Power. When she recorded a duet with Velasquez for the album Fall In Love Again, Quinto stated that it was a childhood dream fulfilled.

Quinto also named several Filipina singers, including Jessa Zaragoza and Jolina Magdangal, as inspirations, particularly noting Roselle Nava and her single "Dahil Mahal Na Mahal Kita" as the first song she had performed in an amateur singing contest. She credited Magdangal's "Kapag Ako'y Nagmahal" as another competition staple. She has also paid tribute to singers such as Jaya, Sharon Cuneta, and Zsa Zsa Padilla, whom she considers as "beloved idols", during her concerts.

=== Musical style and themes ===
"Patuloy Ang Pangarap" (2011)
Quinto's music is noted for its sentimental and emotional undertones. Many have been featured on soundtracks, including "Patuloy Ang Pangarap", which was used for television shows that aired in 2011 and 2013.

Quinto is known for her vocal range and belting technique, and has often been regarded as a "power belter". She is a soprano. Early in her career, critics likened her singing style, sound and musical material to that of Velasquez; a physical resemblance to Velasquez has sparked criticism and scrutiny of Quinto for being a manufactured imitation of the veteran singer. Quinto said of the comparison, "She has been my idol for so long, of course, it would show in my performance. But I always try to do things with my own touch. I am a performer, I have my own style. Maybe because people also associate me with my idol, so that is what they see." Joseph Atilano of the Philippine Daily Inquirer praised her performance on Higher Love, and highlighted her "vocal presence" and ability to sing "on pitch and on time". According to critic Rito Asilo, the songs from her album @LoveAngelineQuinto stood out for their "texture and seamless vocal placement shifts". In a review of her live performances in Royals, Allan Policarpio, also from the Philippine Daily Inquirer, wrote that she "displayed exceptional lung power". Policarpio also expressed that she and fellow singer Erik Santos "sounded robust in their respective solo numbers, attacking each one with unwavering intensity". During her 10Q concert series, Manila Standard's Alwin Ignacio lauded Quinto's "range, vocal calisthenics and the ability to tell the story behind the lyrics of songs".

Quinto's music is noted for its themes of love, heartbreak, and empowerment, often with deep sentimental and emotional undertones. ABS-CBNnews.com's Liezel dela Cruz characterized her style as "soulful", adding that it is "soothing and powerful, [with] just the right balance to make a song's narrative deeply touching and real". Having her songs featured as soundtracks of at least 35 films and television series combined, several media outlets have cited Quinto as the "Queen of Teleserye Theme Songs". Boy Abunda of The Philippine Star wrote, "Her vocal power is notable that makes teleserye theme songs all the more affecting." In 2014, she became the first Filipino artist to record all the songs for a television series soundtrack with Sana Bukas pa ang Kahapon (2014). Quinto has received co-writing credits for some of her songs. Regarding her songwriting process for her first original piece, Quinto explained that she was inspired by the music of Donna Cruz, which she described as "upbeat" and bubblegum pop. Atilano writing for the Philippine Daily Inquirer, termed it a "synth-heavy beat", and added that "she is a fairly decent songwriter and she will only get much better over time".

== Personal life ==
Quinto was in a relationship with singer Erik Santos in 2016. The pair refused to speak publicly about it, though they have consistently worked together and have remained friends. Quinto began a relationship with former casino dealer Nonrev Daquina in 2020. Their first child, a son, was born on April 27, 2022. They became engaged in September 2022, and married two years later. Their second child, a daughter, was born on August 14, 2024.

== Awards and accolades ==
After her breakthrough, Quinto was a recipient of an Aliw Award. The single "Patuloy Ang Pangarap" ("The Dream Continues") earned her two Star Awards for Music, including Song of the Year at the 2011 ceremony. In 2012, she garnered a Female Pop Artist Of The Year win at the Star Awards for Music for her second studio album Fall In Love Again. She also received three Awit Awards for the album. At the 2012 Box Office Entertainment Awards, she won Female Recording Artist of the Year. Quinto was a recipient of two Female Artist of the Year recognitions at Star Awards for Music in 2014 and 2017.

== Discography ==
- Angeline Quinto (2011) (reissued as Patuloy ang Pangarap)
- Fall in Love Again (2012)
- Higher Love (2014)
- Sana Bukas Pa ang Kahapon (2014)
- @LoveAngelineQuinto (2017)

== Filmography ==
Film

- Born to Love You (2012)
- Four Sisters and a Wedding (2013)
- Bakit Hindi Ka Crush ng Crush Mo? (2013)
- Beauty in a Bottle (2014)
- That Thing Called Tanga Na (2016)
- Malinak Ya Labi (2016)
- Foolish Love (2017)
- Single Bells (2023)
- Ang Happy Homes ni Diane Hilario (2025)

Television

- Kahit Konting Pagtingin (2013)
- Nathaniel (2015)
- Ang Probinsyano (2017–2018)
- Huwag Kang Mangamba (2021)
- What's Wrong with Secretary Kim (2024)
- The Angeline Quinto Show (2026)
- Kapamilya Deal or No Deal (2026)

== See also ==
- List of Filipino singers
- List of Filipino actresses
- Music of the Philippines
