= List of Sana Bukas Pa ang Kahapon episodes =

Sana Bukas Pa ang Kahapon (Lit: I Wish Yesterday Were Still Tomorrow; English: Tomorrow Belongs to Me) is a 2014 Philippine melodrama television series directed by Jerome C. Pobocan and Trina N. Dayrit, starring Bea Alonzo, Paulo Avelino and Albert Martinez, with Maricar Reyes, together with an ensemble cast. The drama was named after the 1983 film of the same name, courtesy of Viva Films. The series was aired on ABS-CBN and worldwide on The Filipino Channel from June 16, 2014 to October 10, 2014, replacing The Legal Wife.

== List of episodes ==
#	Title	Original Air Date	Nationwide		
#	Title	Original Air Date	Rating	Timeslot Rank	Whole Day Rank
1	"When Rose Met Patrick"	June 16, 2014	21.7%	#1	#4
Although she's heir to one of the biggest chocolate manufacturers in the country, Rose Buenavista (Bea Alonzo) lacks in beauty and confidence. But all of these can change if she tasted the bitterness of a world full of sweetness.
2	"Episode 2"	June 17, 2014	18.5%	#1	#5
Rose (Bea Alonzo) is about to taste the bitter in the sweetness of Patrick's (Paulo Avelino) love.
3	"Episode 3"	June 18, 2014	19.6%	#1	#4
Rose (Bea Alonzo) may soon find love in Patrick (Paulo Avelino) while Emmanuelle (Bea Alonzo) tries to salvage her marriage with Leo (Albert Martinez).
4	"Hahamakin Lahat"	June 19, 2014	19.9%	#1	#4
Patrick (Paulo Avelino) only agreed to Sasha's (Maricar Reyes) plans against Rose to earn money for his grandmother's treatment, but eventually backed out after realizing how good of a person Rose is. Sasha's anger intensifies as they can't hide the true feelings of Patrick and Rose.
5	"Episode 5"	June 20, 2014	21.4%	#1	#4
Rose gave up everything for Patrick (Paulo Avelino). But selfish Sasha (Maricar Reyes) makes sure that she'll put an end to Rose and Patrick's relationship.
6	"Episode 6"	June 23, 2014	23.8%	#1	#4
Henry (Chinggoy Alonzo) decides to reconcile with Rose (Bea Alonzo) and persuade her to return home and to the company as its new president, enraging Sasha (Maricar Reyes) even more. However, soon after Henry and Rose's reconciliation, Henry suddenly falls off from his office building. This is the start of the big change in Rose and Emmanuele's lives.
7	"Episode 7"	June 24, 2014	22.0%	#1	#4
Rose will be in prison (Bea Alonzo) for the sin that she didn't do and will be punished on the lies that is surrounding on the man she loved the most (Paulo Avelino).
8	"Episode 8"	June 25, 2014	22.9%	#1	#4
Photos from Henry's (Chinggoy Alonzo) investigation will deeply hurt Rose and destroy everything that she has believed in.
9	"The Departed"	June 26, 2014	22.7%	#1	#4
Rose (Bea Alonzo) wakes up from a nightmare and finds herself in the arms of Emmanuel's family.
10	"Kailan Tama Ang Mali?"	June 27, 2014	20.7%	#1	#4
Ruth (Susan Roces) discovers that the woman, whom they believe is Emmanuel is actually Rose (Bea Alonzo).
11	"Apoy sa Puso"	June 30, 2014	22.2%	#1	#4
Following her successful reconstructive surgeries abroad, Rose (Bea Alonzo) finally reveals to Ruth (Susan Roces) that she is not Emmanuelle. Despite being torn between keeping the truth about Emmanuelle's death and robbing Kit his joy over the recovery of his mother, Ruth decides to lend Emmanuelle's identity to Rose.
12	"Episode 12"	July 1, 2014	20.0%	#1	#5
Kasabay sa pagbabago ng mukha ni Rose (Bea Alonzo) ay ang pagbabago ng mundo nina Patrick (Paulo Avelino) at Sasha (Maricar Reyes).
13	"Body of Lies"	July 2, 2014	21.6%	#1	#5
Still lamenting the death of his wife, Patrick (Paulo Avelino) drowns his misery in alcohol. In turn, Sasha (Maricar Reyes) takes advantage of Patrick's deplorable condition to satisfy her selfish desires.
14	"Episode 14"	July 3, 2014	19.8%	#1	#5
Rose (Bea Alonzo) begins her own journey using Emmanuelle's identity after the successful plastic surgery. She will now prepare to revenge all the people that has been unfaithful to her in exchange for her money, and Patrick (Paulo Avelino) and Sasha (Maricar Reyes) are on top of the list.
15	"Episode 15"	July 4, 2014	21.0%	#1	#5
Guilt suddenly strikes Rose (Bea Alonzo) when she realizes that she cannot fulfill Emmanuelle's duty as a wife to Leo (Albert Martinez). Leo, on the other hand, starts to notice his wife's strange actions.
16	"Episode 16"	July 7, 2014	18.2%	#1	#5
Rose (Bea Alonzo) finds a way to reunite with Violet (Michelle Vito) though she still has to hide behind Emmanuelle's guise.
17	"Episode 17"	July 8, 2014	20.4%	#1	#4
Rose, guised as Emmanuelle (Bea Alonzo), opens Prestige's chocolate shop just beside Buena Criollo which marks the beginning of her sweet revenge against Patrick (Pauo Avelino) and Sasha (Maricar Reyes).
18	"Episode 18"	July 9, 2014	15.1%	#1	#8
News of Sasha's (Maricar Reyes) childbirth to Patrick's (Paulo Avelino) daughter not only infuriates Rose (Bea Alonzo) but also pushes her to use Emmanuelle's identity to exact revenge on the people who ruined her life, but Ruth (Susan Roces) starts to think otherwise.
19	"Episode 19"	July 10, 2014	21.9%	#1	#4
Using Emmanuelle's identity as her weapon, Rose (Bea Aonzo) begins her quest for justice and revenge by winning Patrick's (Paulo Avelino) trust. Sasha (Maricar Reyes), on the other hand, is convinced that Emmanuelle is up to something beyond business competition.
20	"Episode 20"	July 11, 2014	18.8%	#1	#6
Truth will find its way out and Rose (Bea Alonzo) has to be quick before it reaches Leo (Albert Martinez).
21	"Doble Kara"	July 14, 2014	20.5%	#1	#4
Leo (Albert Martinez) finally figures out that Emmanuelle (Bea Alonzo) has been keeping a string of lies, leading him to confront her and demand for the truth once and for all.
22	"Duda"	July 15, 2014	13.8%	#1	#5
A big revelation is about to be revealed and Leo will be digging the truth from Emmanuelle.
23	"Bilang Na Ang Oras Mo"	July 17, 2014	12.0%	#1	#5
Leo (Albert Martinez) begins to realize that the Emmanuel (Bea Alonzo) that survived the car explosion could be somebody else. Will Rose and Ruth still manage to cover the truth?
24	"An Inconvenient Truth	July 18, 2014	16.0%	#1	#4
Leo (Albert Martinez) will find a way to confirm if the woman that he took home from the hospital is indeed Emmanuelle.
25	"Desperada"	July 21, 2014	16.9%	#1	#5
Rose's (Bea Alonzo) string of lies finally come to an end when Leo (Albert Martinez) finally gets hold of a solid evidence to prove his suspicion. This will be the start of the true fight and Sasha is the first one who is going to get the first attack of Rose's revenge.
26	"Episode 26"	July 22, 2014	18.0%	#1	#6
The world is getting smaller for Emmanuelle, Patrick and Sasha and Rose moves further to achieve justice.
27	"Don't Give Up on Us"	July 23, 2014	17.7%	#1	#6
Seeing the outcome of the plan she masterminded, Ruth (Susan Roces) attempts to alter Leo's (Albert Martinez) decision by revealing that Rose (Bea Alonzo) is their only key in finding justice for Emmanuelle's death. The plan is going to be made for one big lie, but it wouldn't be easy.
28	"Babangon Ako't Dudurugin Kita"	July 24, 2014	20.5%	#1	#4
All for Emmanuelle's sake, Leo (Albert Martinez) agrees to let Rose (Bea Alonzo) use his wife's identity while searching for evidence against her adversaries. He also offers his help acquire Buena Criollo's stocks in order to hasten their search.
29	"The Enemy"	July 25, 2014	19.7%	#1	#5
Patrick (Paulo Avelino) wins the trust of Buena Criollo's board members through his proposed expansion project, which, in turn, thwarts Carlos (Tonton Gutierrez) and Laura's (Dina Bonnevie) combined efforts to continue pulling the strings in the company. But Rose makes sure that she is still part of the game by becoming one of Buena Criollo's board members.
30	"The Threat"	July 28, 2014	20.2%	#1	#4
Now that she has crossed the threshold of Buena Criollo, Rose (Bea Alonzo) takes the next step and eyes on stealing the presidency from Patrick (Paulo Avelino). While everyone is rattled by Emmanuelle's sudden move, Laura (Dina Bonevie) intends to make the best of the situation, especially against Sasha and Patrick. Rose, on the other hand, faces backlash against her actions when Violet (Michelle Vito) comes to believe that she was only used by Emmanuelle to get into the company.
31	"The Redemption"	July 29, 2014	19.6%	#1	#4
Rose (Bea Alonzo) makes sure that Patrick (Paulo Avelino) will not be Bueno Criollo's president for long.
32	"Episode 32"	July 30, 2014	18.6%	#1	#5
Rose is willing to do anything just to get Patrick's trust, but someone would stop her.
33	"Lito"	July 31, 2014	19.6%	#1	#4
Rose (Bea Alonzo) will find it difficult to keep a secret from her grandfather, Magno (Eddie Garcia). There is an evidence that will be discovered by Magno that may help or complicate Rose's investigation.
34	"Confirmations"	August 1, 2014	20.3%	#1	#4
Patrick feels something different about Emmanuelle.
35	"Durog"	August 4, 2014	19.5%	#1	#4
Sasha (Maricar Reyes) is determined to have Patrick (Paulo Avelino) all to herself but Emmanuelle (Bea Alonzo) thinks otherwise.
36	"Muli"	August 5, 2014	21.2%	#1	#4
Leo and Rose's plan intensifies. But can Rose renounce the kindness just to break Patrick and Sasha's family?
37	"Alaga"	August 6, 2014	22.5%	#1	#4
One accident will change in Leo's true feelings for Rose.
38	"Simula"	August 7, 2014	20.8%	#1	#4
Patrick (Paulo Avelino) decides to befriend Emmanuelle (Bea Alonzo) again in order to learn of her real intentions. While Patrick and Emmanuelle are getting close, Leo is also starting to fall for Rose.
39	"Ligtas"	August 8, 2014	21.5%	#1	#4
Patrick still wants to return with his sweetness with Rose.
40	"Civil"	August 11, 2014	20.2%	#1	#4
Patrick (Paulo Avelino) grows closer to Emmanuelle, while drifting further apart from his wife.
41	"I Do"	August 12, 2014	20.0%	#1	#4
Rose and Patrick's beautiful past is hard to go back to.
42	"Episode 42"	August 13, 2014	21.1%	#1	#4
As he becomes more and more comfortable with Emmanuelle (Bea Alonzo), Patrick (Paulo Avelino) finds himself comparing her with Sasha (Maricar Reyes), who tries to make an effort to be a good wife.
43	"Iwas"	August 14, 2014	20.2%	#1	#4
Rose will be forcing herself to kill her feelings for Patrick.
44	"Galit"	August 15, 2014	20.3%	#1	#4
Patrick is falling for Rose.
45	"1st Love"	August 18, 2014	19.6%	#1	#4
Even if the heart is wounded, Rose's feelings for Patrick is still undeniably true. Until when can Rose fight for justice?
46	"Lihim"	August 19, 2014	18.5%	#1	#4
Rose (Bea Alonzo) realizes that she still loves Patrick (Paulo Avelino) and Leo (Albert Martinez) finds a way to help her stick with the plan.
47	"Pamilya"	August 20, 2014	20.0%	#1	#4
Ruth (Susan Roces) senses that something is amiss with Rose (Bea Alonzo) and keeps a close watch on the young woman until Rose finally admits her lingering feelings for Patrick (Paulo Avelino).
48	"Traydor"	August 21, 2014	18.7%	#1	#5
Old wounds resurface after Sasha (Maricar Reyes) recalls how Laura (Dina Bonnevie) became wife of Buena Criollio's owner.
49	"Linlang"	August 22, 2014	21.6%	#1	#4
Laura (Dina Bonnevie) and Carlos (Tonton Gutierrez) conspire to remove Patrick (Paulo Avelino) as president of Buena Criollo by taking charge of his Dubai project, but Rose has a better idea and she will need Patrick's help.
50	"Planta"	August 25, 2014	17.8%	#1	#5
Oras na para magkampihan. Who is the real enemy and who is the real ally?
51	"Hinala"	August 26, 2014	19.6%	#1	#5
Mabangis ang kalaban at handa nang makipagtulungan si Rose (Bea Alonzo) sa kaniyang Lolo Magno (Eddie Garcia).
52	"Proof"	August 27, 2014	19.1%	#1	#5
For the love he bears for his late granddaughter, Magno (Eddie Garcia) means to continue his own investigation on Rose's (Bea Alonzo) death, and Emmanuelle is ready to help.
53	"Uninvited"	August 28, 2014	20.4%	#1	#6
Patrick (Paulo Avelino) thinks it's best to invite Laura (Dina Bonnevie) and Carlos (Tonton Gutierrez) to their baby's birthday.
54	"Caught"	August 29, 2014	19.7%	#1	#6
Rose (Bea Alonzo) and Leo (Albert Martinez) proceed with their next course of action on their investigation of Henry's death.
55	"Fooled"	September 1, 2014	19.3%	#1	#6
Rose (Bea Alonzo) is a step closer to finding out the truth as she, Ruth (Susan Roces), and Leo (Albert Martinez) learn from the CCTV footage they retrieved that Patrick (Paulo Avelino) was in Buena Criollo on the night of Henry's murder. Meanwhile, Patrick finally lets Sasha (Maricar Reyes) in on his motive for befriending Emmanuelle.
56	"Para Sa'Yo"	September 2, 2014	18.8%	#1	#6
Carlos (Tonton Guttierrez) and Fidel (Bembol Roco) may have an agreement that even Laura (Dina Bonevie) cannot be part of.
57	"Accused"	September 3, 2014	17.0%	#1	#7
With the evidences they acquired related to Henry's murder, Leo (Albert Martinez) and Ruth (Susan Roces) ponder on anonymously filing charges against Patrick (Paulo Avelino).
58	"Defense"	September 4, 2014	17.5%	#1	#7
Patrick (Paulo Avelino) is about to tell his story about the night when Henry was killed.
59	"Hints"	September 5, 2014	18.5%	#1	#6
Patrick's (Paulo Avelino) revelation of his undying care for his ex-wife bothers Rose (Bea Alonzo), but it does not stop her from filing charges against Patrick for Henry's murder.
60	"I Am Rose"	September 8, 2014	19.4%	#1	#6
Magno (Eddie Garcia) becomes even more curious of Emmanuelle's (Bea Alonzo) identity as he spends more time with the lawyer. Meanwhile, Patrick (Paulo Avelino) learns about Emmanuelle's connection with Magno and soon goes to the Romero residence to demand some explanation from the lawyer.
61	"Concern"	September 9, 2014	20.3%	#1	#5
After revealing her true identity to Magno (Eddie Garcia), Rose (Bea Alonzo) slowly lets go of her disguise as she becomes more vulnerable to Patrick's (Paulo Avelino) stories about his departed wife.
62	"The Kiss"	September 10, 2014	20.3%	#1	#6
The past will come back because of a kiss.
63	"Awaken"	September 11, 2014	19.4%	#1	#6
After kissing Emmanuelle (Bea Alonzo), Patrick (Paulo Avelino) gets a strong feeling that he actually connected with his wife, Rose.
64	"Denied"	September 12, 2014	19.2%	#1	#7
Worried about her sister, Rose (Bea Alonzo) wants to reveal her true identity to Violet (Michelle Vito) as well, but Magno (Eddie Garcia) thinks of a better plan.
65	"Innocent"	September 15, 2014	17.4%	#1	#6
Rose (Bea Alonzo), on the other hand, realizes that her feelings for her ex-husband have become even more apparent after hearing Patrick (Paulo Avelino) talk about his love for his ex-wife.
66	"Hope"	September 16, 2014	17.8%	#1	#8
Leo (Albert Martinez) is ready to do anything to take away Rose (Bea Alonzo) from her husband Patrick (Paulo Avelino).
67	"Inggit"	September 17, 2014	19.1%	#1	#4
Even if Leo is forcing to separate Rose and Patrick, destiny is the one who is making a move. This is the moment that will change everything.
68	"Eliminate"	September 18, 2014	18.5%	#1	#6
Rose (Bea Alonzo), Leo (Albert Martinez), Ruth (Susan Roces) and Magno (Eddie Garcia) continue to work hand in hand in squeezing out vital information from Rocky (Nikki Valdez) and in figuring out the real mastermind of Henry's murder. Amid his continued search for justice, Leo becomes bothered with Rose's desire to get back to the life she once had with Patrick.
69	"Alab"	September 19, 2014	16.6%	#1	#8
Rose (Bea Alonzo) becomes the mistress of her own husband, Patrick (Paulo Avelino).
70	"Truth"	September 22, 2014	18.9%	#1	#5
Ipaglalaban na ni Leo (Albert Martinez) ang tunay na nararamdaman ng kanyang puso para kay Rose (Bea Alonzo). Can he stand a chance now that Rose has given herself back to her husband, Patrick (Paulo Avelino)?
71	"Akin Ka"	September 23, 2014	18.1%	#1	#7
Magsisimula na ang agawan sa asawa. Sino ang dapat panigan, sino ang dapat paniwalaan Rose (Bea Alonzo)?
72	"Trapped"	September 24, 2014	20.7%	#1	#6
Is it called unfaithfulness if your relationship with a person is your ex-husband? Patrick is still holding on to his belief that Emmanuelle is Rose. But Sasha (Maricar Reyes) won't make it easy for him.
73	"2 Pag-ibig"	September 25, 2014	20.6%	#1	#5
Emmanuelle (Bea Alonzo) is about to reveal her true identity to Patrick (Paulo Avelino).
74	"Admit"	September 26, 2014	20.4%	#1	#5
Sasha's (Maricar Reyes) pleas to give her marriage with Patrick (Paulo Avelino) another try fall on deaf ears as Patrick goes on with his annulment plans. Meanwhile, Leo (Albert Marrtinez) makes a move on winning Rose's affection However, Patrick takes a step ahead of Leo as his real wife falls for him once again.
75	"1 Survival"	September 29, 2014	21.6%	#1	#5
Anger dawns on Sasha (Maricar Reyes) as she finally confirms her suspicions against Patrick (Paulo Avelino) and Emmanuelle (Bea Alonzo).
76	"2 Right"	September 30, 2014	21.9%	#1	#4
Leo wants to make sure that Patrick will no longer be part of Rose's life.
77	"3 Identity"	October 1, 2014	21.5%	#1	#4
Rose (Bea Alonzo) can't help but watch her family crumble as Laura (Dina Bonnevie) and Carlos (Tonton Guttierez) announced their engagement and Laura's legal adoption of Violet (Michelle Vito).
78	"4 Freedom"	October 2, 2014	21.1%	#1	#6
Now that Sasha (Maricar Reyes) has finally figured our who Emmanuelle (Bea Alonzo) really is, she begins to set a plan against her husband's real wife.
79	"5 Power"	October 3, 2014	20.8%	#1	#5
Sasha (Maricar Reyes) finally unfolds the mystery behind Emmanuelle's (Bea Alonzo) real identity through Patrick's (Paulo Avelino) confounding statements and Emmanuelle's allergic reaction to chocolate. Now she is determined to get rid of Rose with the help of her real father, Carlos (Tonton Guttierez).
80	"6 Truth"	October 6, 2014	21.5%	#1	#5
Is Rose's (Bea Alonzo) determination to avenge her father enough to protect her from the limitless evil of Sasha (Maricar Reyes) and her real father, Carlos (Tonton Gutierrez)?
81	"4 Family"	October 7, 2014	22.0%	#1	#5
Laura (Dina Bonnevie) is about to discover who Emmanuelle (Bea Alonzo) really is and Sasha (Maricar Reyes) can no longer hide her greatest secret from Patrick (Paulo Avelino).
82	"3 Justice"	October 8, 2014	24.4%	#1	#5
Violet (Michelle Vito) is in the hands of Muerte, who turns out to be Carlos (Tonton Guttierrez). Will Rose (Bea Alonzo) surrender to the enemy?
83	"2 Love"	October 9, 2014	22.8%	#1	#5
The fight for Buena Criolio is over but the ultimate fight for Rose's (Bea Alonzo) love for Patrick (Paulo Avelino) is just beginning.
84	"1 Self"	October 10, 2014	27.3%	#1	#4
Rose (Bea Alonzo) also reclaims Buena Criollo and sets herself free from hiding as Emmanuelle. But will her fight for love be victorious or will it receive a tragic ending?
