= Beauty in a Bottle =

- Official movie poster
- Directed by: Antoinette Jadaone
- Screenplay by: Antoinette Jadaone
- Story by: Chris Martinez; Antoinette Jadaone
- Produced by: Charo Santos-Concio; Malou N. Santos; Enrico C. Santos; Josabeth V. Alonso
- Starring: Angelica Panganiban; Angeline Quinto; Assunta de Rossi
- Cinematography: Gary Gardoce
- Edited by: Beng Bandong; Carlo Francisco Manatad
- Music by: Emerzon Texon
- Production companies: Star Cinema; Quantum Films; Skylight Films
- Distributed by: Star Cinema
- Release date: October 29, 2014
- Country: Philippines
- Languages: Filipino; English

Beauty in a Bottle is a 2014 Filipino satirical comedy drama film directed by Antoinette Jadaone. The film stars Angelica Panganiban, Angeline Quinto, and Assunta de Rossi. It was produced by Quantum Films, Skylight Films and Star Cinema for its 20th anniversary.

The film had its commercial release on October 29, 2014.

== Cast ==
Main cast

- Angelica Panganiban as Estelle Suarez
- Angeline Quinto as Judith Madamba
- Assunta de Rossi as Vilma Ledesma

Supporting cast

- Tom Rodriguez as Pocholo
- Carmi Martin as Miss Santy
- Cai Cortez as Wendy
- Nanette Inventor as Donya Charito
- Empress Schuck as herself
- Ellen Adarna as Tanya Jacinto
- Ana Roces as Joy Madamba
- Dimples Romana as Anna
- Ricci Chan as Brand Manager
- Nico Antonio as Asst. Brand Manager
- Boboy Garovillo as Doming
- Bianca Manalo as Queenie
- Anna Luna as Princess

=== Special participation ===
- Vicki Belo as herself
- Christalle Henares as herself
- Marian Yance as Chesca
- Maxine Medina as Atty. Peaches

== Theme song ==
- OH Boy Strong Sung by Toni Gonzaga from The Album Celestine.
