= Born to Love You (film) =

- Theatrical release poster
- Directed by: Jerome Chavez Pobocan
- Written by: Rondel P. Lindayag; Rodel P. Nacianceno; Roldeo T. Endrinal
- Screenplay by: Rondel P. Lindayag
- Produced by: Charo Santos-Concio; Malou N. Santos; Rodel P. Nacianceno
- Starring: Coco Martin; Angeline Quinto
- Cinematography: Hermann Claravall; Gary Gardoce
- Edited by: Renewin Alano
- Music by: Cesar Francis S. Concio
- Production companies: Star Cinema; CineMedia Film Productions
- Distributed by: Star Cinema
- Release date: May 30, 2012
- Running time: 105 minutes
- Country: Philippines
- Languages: Filipino; Korean
- Box office: ₱54,769,704.00

Born to Love You is a 2012 Philippine romantic film directed by Jerome Pabocan, starring Coco Martin and Angeline Quinto. The film was released under CineMedia and distributed by Star Cinema on May 30, 2012.

The film is Quinto's acting debut.

== Plot ==
The film centers around Joey Liwanag (Angeline Quinto), a poor girl who works as a part-time tourist guide for Koreans and likes joining amateur singing contests with her two younger siblings to help her family cope with financial problems. Despite the hardship and low probability, Joey works hard to save up money in order to go to Korea, and meet her real father who has abandoned her when she was very young.

Rex Manrique (Coco Martin) is a frustrated, very arrogant and hot-tempered photographer who is out to prove to the world that he can stand on his own feet and succeed in life independently. However, the ladder of success seems to be impossible for him as he faces different complications and rejections in life, as well as his career.

The moment Rex and Joey encountered each other in a Korean wedding, these two grew a big misunderstanding and hatred towards each other, making it hard for the two of them to get along in the first place. Things get more out of hand when Rex was hired in an advertising company where Joey was also working for—this time, as a translator. As they got to know each other, they found solace and comfort in each other's company. But the security that they found in each other soon starts to shake when life takes another course and drives them into a complicated situation. Joey finally meets her biological father, while Rex struggles finding acceptance and forgiveness for her Mother who abandoned her for another man when he was still a young boy. Although Rex cuts off their relationship, Joey tries everything that she could to help him go through his own challenges and promises Rex that she will never leave him. But when Rex finally figures out the answers to his questions and his purpose in life, he and Joey get into a car accident making Rex decide to leave Joey and his family behind and start a new life.

After a couple of years of investigation, Joey finally finds Rex in an island in Batangas and confronts him about their relationship which they broke off unofficially. At the same time, Joey finds out that Rex turned blind after saving her life in the accident and Rex himself found forgiveness in his heart. The movie ends during Rex and Joey's wedding celebration.

== Cast ==
=== Main cast ===
- Coco Martin as Rex Manrique
  - Jairus Aquino as Young Rex Manrique
- Angeline Quinto as Joey Liwanag

=== Supporting cast ===
- Albert Martinez as Charles Ronquillo
- Eula Valdez as Sylvia
- Al Tantay as Mario Liwanag
- Tonton Gutierrez as Rex's father
- Malou de Guzman as Ampie Liwanag
- Kiray Celis as Sampaguita Liwanag
- Amy Nobleza as Corrita Liwanag
- Eda Nolan as Jam
- Mickey Ferriols as Bianca
- Louise Abuel as Brian
- Ryan Bang
- Manuel Aquino as Ku Aquino
- David Chua
- Jojit Lorenzo
- Aloy Noranda
- Chris Pasturan
- Jenny Kim
- Richard Quan
- Andre Tiangco

== Box office ==
"Born to Love You" earned ₱6,000,000.00 in its opening day.
