= What's Wrong with Secretary Kim (Philippine TV series) =

2024 Philippine romantic comedy television series

- Promotional poster
- Also known as: What Happened to Secretary Kim
- Genre: Romantic comedy
- Based on: Why Secretary Kim by Jung Kyung-yoon
- Written by: Jaja Amarillo; Jaymar S. Castro; Raymund Barcelon
- Directed by: Chad V. Vidanes; Paco Sta. Maria
- Starring: Kim Chiu; Paulo Avelino
- Ending theme: "Uuwian" by JL of BGYO
- Country of origin: Philippines
- Original language: Filipino
- No. of episodes: 40

Production
- Executive producers: Carlo Katigbak; Cory Vidanes; Laurenti Dyogi; Roldeo Endrinal
- Producer: Row Tan
- Camera setup: Single-camera
- Running time: 21–36 minutes
- Production company: Dreamscape Entertainment

Original release
- Network: Viu
- Release: March 18 – June 12, 2024

Related
- What's Wrong with Secretary Kim (South Korea)

What's Wrong with Secretary Kim is a Philippine romantic comedy television series loosely based on the 2018 South Korean television drama series of the same name. It stars Kim Chiu and Paulo Avelino. The series streamed on Viu from March 18 to June 12, 2024.

== Premise ==
A competent secretary and a narcissistic boss fall in love while uncovering a traumatic past that causes them to question whether their feelings are real or the result of a shared trauma.

== Cast and characters ==
Main cast

- Kim Chiu as Kimberly "Kim" Liwanag
- Paulo Avelino as Brandon Manansala "BMC" Castillo

Supporting cast

- Jake Cuenca as Cyrus "Morpheus" Castillo
- Janice de Belen as Carlota Castillo
- Romnick Sarmenta as Felix Liwanag
- Franco Laurel as Robert Castillo
- Angeline Quinto as Sarah Angeles
- Pepe Herrera as Philip Alvarez
- Yves Flores as Jordan "Jordy" Agoncillo
- Gillian Vicencio as Stephanie "Steph" Roxas
- Kaori Oinuma as Kim Marie Flores
- JC Alcantara as Ronald "Roni" Ramos
- Cai Cortez as Klarisse "Kla" Liwanag
- Kat Galang as Katrina "Kat" Liwanag
- Phi Palmos as Walter Ignacio
- Brian Sy as Baldonado "Baldo" Aguinaldo
- Race Matias as Troy
- Kim Won-shik as Daniel Park

Guest cast

- Sharmaine Suarez as Mrs. Liwanag
- Chastity Claire Dizon as young Kim
- Stanley Abuloc as young Brandon
- Benedict Lao as young Cyrus
- Sachzna Laparan as Jessy Manuel
- Raul Montesa as Dr. Villa
- Froilan Manto as Greg
- Rayden Gracie Co
- Alireza Libre
- Ricci Chan
- Stanley Abuloc
- Reign Parani as applicant
- Sam Samarita as applicant
- Bart Guingona as Brandon's doctor/therapist
- Olive Isidro as teacher of Castillo brothers
- Via Antonio as Jane
- Abi Kassem as Maya
- Heidi Arima
- Ricci Chan as Iñigo Castro
- Anna Luna as Laura
- Kate Alejandrino as Dina Mallari
- Mary Joy Apostol as Gladys Mallari
- Tootsy Angara as Pauline Dacanay
- Gail Banawis as Prime Alpha employee
- Nickea Covar as Prime Alpha employee
- Victoria Roxas as Prime Alpha employee
- Aya Fernandez as Dawn Punzalan
- Mimi Marquez wedding gown designer
- Laziz Rustamov
- Dr. Vicki Belo

== Episodes ==
No.	Title	Original release date (Note: Advanced episodes release every Monday to Wednesday starting from episodes 4 and 5, and available for premium users.)
1	"Beauty and the Boss"	March 18, 2024
Amid a busy event, Kim Liwanag stands out as a reliable secretary who is in control of everything. When an unforeseen problem ensues, Kim wastes no time and springs into action before her narcissistic boss arrives. Later, Kim makes a tough decision.
2	"The Boss's Proposal"	March 18, 2024
Brandon presents various offers in an attempt to prevent Kim from leaving her post, but to no avail. Soon, however, he makes a shocking proposal as his secretary makes up a reason behind her resignation.
3	"Someone Like Kim"	March 18, 2024
The recruitment process for Kim's replacement kicks off, yet Brandon remains puzzled by his secretary's unwavering determination to leave. Getting wind of an investor's move to get Kim behind his back, Brandon starts to question her loyalty.
4	"Are You Kara-OK"	March 25, 2024
Awkwardness hangs between Brandon and Kim as both of them expect an apology from each other following their heated exchange. Noticing that his secretary is avoiding him, Brandon joins Kim and his staff's night out unannounced.
5	"The Pursuit of Kim's Happiness"	March 26, 2024
A weird survey from the HR Department sends the office into a frenzy. Later, Kim agrees to attend a blind date set up by her sister, but an emergency meeting foils her plan.
6	"Can't Hardly Date"	March 27, 2024
Brandon's brother is coming home but that seems to trigger a traumatic experience from his childhood. Meanwhile, Secretary Kim finally went on a date with a college friend, and when Brandon find out he went on searching for her.
7	"The Games We Play"	April 1, 2024
Kim Marie's unconscious mistake triggers Brandon's past trauma. Envious of a colleague forming a bond with Kim during the company sports fest, Brandon decides to participate in the games, much to the employees' surprise.
8	"The Pairing Trap"	April 2, 2024
Kim starts to entertain her sister's theory about Brandon's traumatic childhood after tending to her boss' sprained ankle. The next day, a crisis about their company's event leads Brandon to challenge Kim and her team with an impossible task.
9	"Hello, Morpheus..."	April 3, 2024
Prime Alpha's big event is just around the corner, and the staff have yet to find a keynote speaker. Thankfully, Kim finds the perfect match through her favorite author, the reclusive Morpheus. Brandon receives an unwelcome visitor at his office.
10	"My Brother's Keeper"	April 8, 2024
Felix becomes upset with Kim for investigating her past abduction without his knowledge. Kim manages to convince Brandon to have dinner with his family, but the supposedly happy reunion turns sour when Brandon and Cyrus end up in a fight.
11	"Brandon M. Confused"	April 9, 2024
After finding themselves in a compromising situation, Brandon makes an excuse to lighten things up. While this incident opens new and confusing feelings for Kim, Brandon indirectly consults Philip for his next moves.
12	"First Date?"	April 10, 2024
Acting on his mother's advice, Cyrus sets up a meeting with Kim as Morpheus. However, Kim declines his invitation as she is scheduled to have dinner date with Brandon. While trying out different dresses, Kim accidentally calls her boss.
13	"Morphing Time"	April 15, 2024
After their disastrous encounter with Cyrus, both Brandon and Kim refuse to apologize and give each other a cold shoulder at work the next day. Kim Marie enlists Steph's help to confirm her hunch about Roni.
14	"Hard to Say I'm Sorry"	April 16, 2024
Brandon's stubbornness prevents him from apologizing to his secretary. Cyrus, on the contrary, surprises Kim with an immediate apology. As Kim learns Cyrus' past after an unexpected heart-to-heart talk, she also starts to understand Brandon better.
15	"Push and Pull"	April 17, 2024
Following a misunderstanding, Brandon tags along with Kim in hopes of making up with her. On the other hand, Kim Marie spots a familiar face while looking for an affordable flat to rent.
16	"Finding Ninja Boy"	April 22, 2024
Thanks to Troy's journalistic skills, Kim discovers Ninja Boy is one of the Castillo brothers. To verify her hunch, Kim probes into Brandon's past. Aside from her, however, Troy is also eager to uncover the truth for personal reasons.
17	"A Talk to Remember"	April 23, 2024
Romantic tensions rise between Kim and Brandon as she is convinced that her boss and Ninja Boy are the same person. Unsure of how to make him remember, Kim calls out to Brandon as Ninja Boy, only to later find out that her hunch is wrong.
18	"Torn Between Two Brothers"	April 24, 2024
Brandon grows troubled when Kim informs him that she finally found Ninja Boy, and he is none other than Cyrus. To make matters worse, his concern heightens when he spots his secretary meeting up with his brother.
19	"The Great Wall of BMC"	April 29, 2024
Cyrus and Brandon agree to resolve their issue the same way they used to—through a game. If Brandon wins, Cyrus will leave him alone for good. The brothers later settle on a wall climbing race, leaving Kim extremely worried.
20	"Check the Label"	April 30, 2024
Cyrus starts to see Kim in a different light when they visit the crime scene of the kidnapping incident. Driven by jealousy and frustration, Brandon makes brazen moves to take his and Kim's relationship to the next level.
21	"The Party Crashers"	May 1, 2024
With Brandon in attendance, Kim's despedida party turns into a work-related open forum. During the team building activity, Brandon utilizes his negotiation skills to ensure that he is paired with Kim and gets some alone time with her.
22	"Other Half of Me"	May 6, 2024
New romances blossom among the Prime Alpha employees. Elsewhere, while stuck in the rain, Brandon asks Kim about her trauma and advises her against dwelling on the past. Meanwhile, Cyrus gets to spend time with his parents.
23	"This is Where I Kiss You"	May 7, 2024
Both Kim and Brandon excitedly prepared for their dinner date at the latter's place. However, Brandon's claim to perfection is swiftly debunked when he finds himself amidst a kitchen catastrophe. Cyrus confronts Troy to issue a warning.
24	"One Fine Date"	May 8, 2024
Brandon's jealousy intensifies upon learning from Carlota that his brother may be falling in love with Kim. Cyrus, on the other hand, decides to finally confess his feelings.
25	"Idea Ex Marks the Spot"	May 13, 2024
Brandon mulls revealing the truth about Ninja Boy to Kim. As the Castillos' most kept secret gets exposed during the company event where Cyrus is a speaker, Kim finds the courage to confess her true feelings to her boss.
26	"Kiss You Later"	May 14, 2024
Brandon and Kim's deep feelings for each other erupt in a passionate kiss, marking the beginning of their new relationship. Kim and the Castillos discover the person responsible for the malicious questions thrown at Cyrus during the event.
27	"Secret Romance"	May 15, 2024
As Brandon struggles to hide his love for his girlfriend, Kim sets boundaries to keep their relationship a secret from their colleagues. Carlota grows curious about Kim's boyfriend after learning the news from Cyrus.
28	"It's Complicated"	May 20, 2024
Despite Kim's effort to keep her relationship status a secret, her sisters rush to her side to have some serious talk about Brandon. Meanwhile, Kim Marie finally moves into her new place, only to be ruined by Roni's mistake.
29	"Ninja Boy-friend?"	May 21, 2024
Kim's suspicion that Brandon and Ninja Boy are one and the same strengthens upon seeing her boyfriend's old photos. Brandon, on the other hand, realizes that he needs to win the Liwanag family over as he accompanies a heartbroken Philip.
30	"Meet the Fam"	May 22, 2024
Roni is forced to hide when Kim Marie's coworkers arrive to surprise her. Kim brim with Joy when Brandon bonds with her family. Her happiness, however, is cut short when images of her traumatic past resurface during the presentation for Mr. Park.
31	"It's All Coming Back to Her Now"	May 27, 2024
Brandon is forced to come clean with Kim as his secretary's memory from the past comes to haunt her. Unbeknownst to the Prime Alpha vice chairman, a much bigger challenge awaits.
32	"Second Chances"	May 28, 2024
Carlota tried to make Felix understand Brandon's reason for lying to his daughter. Cyrus, on the other hand, talks about the traumatic story behind his essay as he bridges the gap between Kim and his brother.
33	"Know You're Trouble, Trouble! Trouble!"	May 29, 2024
Robert and Carlota learn that Cyrus is planning to go back to Berlin. Brandon calls for a meeting to solve a costly shipment issue before it reaches the Parks, unaware that Daniel is already aware of the fiasco.
34	"Buttons Up! (or Down?)"	June 3, 2024
Brandon gets heartbroken after overhearing Kim deny that they are in a relationship. While unwinding with Philip, the CEO begins to question his decision to stick to his principles as his company faces a crisis.
35	"When Two Become One"	June 4, 2024
While Brandon asks for Robert's assistance in solving Prime Alpha's problem, Kim learns about Cyrus' plan to leave for Germany. Troy finds out Carlota's secret while interviewing a family member of Brandon's kidnapper.
36	"Rumor Has It"	June 5, 2024
Chaos erupts at Prime Alpha when Kim gets accused of seducing Brandon for promotion. Meanwhile, Brandon turns to Philip for guidance as his secretary continues to ignore his marriage proposal.
37	"The One Ring to Woo Them All"	June 10, 2024
Brandon goes ring shopping with Philip after getting the blessing of Kim's family. Amid a minor hitch in the vice president's plan, a perfect opportunity arises that would set the stage for a life-changing surprise for Kim.
38	"The Past and the Furious"	June 11, 2024
A promising career opportunity abroad knocks on Kim's door, leaving Brandon anxious. Recognizing her fiancé's struggle with his past trauma, Kim enlists Cyrus' help in encouraging Brandon to confront his demons.
39	"A Kim-Possible Wedding"	June 12, 2024
Kim agrees to marry Brandon before relocating to Korea, opting for an intimate wedding that can be organized easily considering the time constraint. However, problems begin to pop-up when their families get involved in the planning process.
40	"30-Day Notice to Forever"	June 12, 2024
An unfortunate incident pushes Kim over the edge, prompting her to reassess her readiness for marriage with her former boss. With Cyrus' help, Brandon orchestrates one final surprise to reaffirm his love and commitment to his bride-to-be.

== Production ==
The series was announced on November 21, 2023.

According to earlier reports, Jake Ejercito was originally cast in the lead role, but was later removed from the project. ABS-CBN tapped Paulo Avelino to play the role previously given to Ejercito.

== Release ==
The series was released on Viu on March 18, 2024. The first three episodes were available for free users, while the two advanced episodes were available for premium users. It is also available on iWantTFC through the United States and Canada.

On its second week, all episodes would be released three times weekly and one episode per day from Monday to Wednesday.

On television, the Philippine adaptation series was made its TV broadcast debut premiered on May 25, 2024, and aired every Saturday and Sunday on Kapamilya Channel, A2Z, and TV5 and ran until July 14, 2024. It was also aired on All TV from September 13 to November 2, 2025.

== Soundtrack ==
What's Wrong with Secretary Kim? Original Soundtrack

Soundtrack album by Various artists
- Released: April 5, 2024
- Genre: Various
- Label: Star Music

The official soundtrack of the series was released on April 5, 2024.

What's Wrong with Secretary Kim? (Original Soundtrack)
No.	Title	Artist	Length
1.	"Uuwian"	JL Toreliza of BGYO	4:21
2.	"Ikaw Sana Siya"	Angela Ken	3:45
3.	"Here With You"	BINI (Note: "Here With You" is performed by Gwen Apuli and Maloi Ricalde of BINI)	3:32
4.	"Mr. Right"	Angeline Quinto	3:28
5.	"To Be With You"	Kim Won Shik	3:34
6.	"Figure You Out"	Joey Ynion	4:10
7.	"Lagi"	BINI	4:16
8.	"Kapag Ako'y Nagmahal"	Jolina Magdangal	4:18
9.	"Heto Ako"	Kaori Oinuma	2:50
10.	"Uuwian (Reprise)"	BGYO	4:21

== Reception ==
The series became the top-one most-watched series on Viu after its premiere, with the streaming platform becoming the top application in Apple App Store as a result of the show's success.

== Accolades ==
Year	Award	Category	Nominee	Result	Ref
2024	Asian Academy Creative Awards	Best Adaptation of an Existing Format (Fiction)	What's Wrong with Secretary Kim?	Won (National Winner)	
2024	Asian Television Awards	Best Actress in a Leading Role	Kim Chiu	Nominated	
2024	Asian Television Awards	Best Theme Song	To Be With You (by Kim Won Shik)	Won	
