= Kahit Konting Pagtingin (TV series) =

- Title card
- Also known as: Just One Glance
- Genre: Romance; Drama; Comedy
- Created by: Reggie Amigo; Rondel P. Lindayag
- Based on: Kahit Konting Pagtingin by Pablo Santiago
- Developed by: ABS-CBN Studios
- Written by: Reggie Amigo; Joel Mercado
- Directed by: Darnel Joy R. Villaflor; Francis E. Pasion
- Starring: Angeline Quinto; Paulo Avelino; Sam Milby
- Opening theme: "Kahit Konting Pagtingin" by Angeline Quinto
- Composer: Levi Celerio
- Country of origin: Philippines
- Original language: Filipino
- No. of episodes: 53

Production
- Executive producers: Carlo Katigbak; Cory Vidanes; Laurenti Dyogi; Roldeo Endrinal; Julie Anne Benitez
- Producer: Hazel Bolisay-Parfan
- Production location: Metro Manila
- Running time: 30 minutes
- Production companies: FPJ Productions; Dreamscape Entertainment Television; Viva Films

Original release
- Network: ABS-CBN
- Release: January 28 – April 12, 2013

Kahit Konting Pagtingin (International title: Just One Glance / transl. Even a Little Bit of a Look) is a 2013 Philippine television drama series broadcast by ABS-CBN. The series is based on 1990 Philippine on the same name. Directed by Darnel Joy R. Villaflor and Francis E. Pasion, it stats Angeline Quinto, Paulo Avelino and Sam Milby. It aired on the network's Primetime Bida line up and worldwide on TFC from January 28 to April 12, 2013, replacing Aryana and was replaced by To the Beautiful You. On March 18, the series was demoted to Kapamilya Gold afternoon block to give way for Little Champ.

The series was streaming online on YouTube.

== Synopsis ==
Aurora is a hardworking and simple girl, who strives to make money for her family. While working at a bar one night, she meets Eric Ledesma, who confides in her about his fiancée leaving him heart broken, after calling off their wedding. Although she tries consoling Eric, it leads them to an unfortunate accident where she is forced to lie about being his real fiancée. Through her crazy yet heartwarming journey with the Ledesma family, she also encounters two of Eric's dashing brothers; the serious but sensitive Adam, and the charming and down to earth Lance, who are both more than willing to do anything to win her heart.

== Cast and characters ==
=== Main cast ===
- Angeline Quinto as Aurora Cantada-Ledesma
- Sam Milby as Adam Ledesma
- Paulo Avelino as Lance Ledesma

=== Supporting cast ===
- Snooky Serna as Faye Roxas
- Joonee Gamboa as Don Arturo Ledesma
- Mylene Dizon as Narissa Ledesma-Dimagiba
- John Lapus as Milo Santiago
- Tommy Abuel as Valerio "Manong Val" Cantada
- James Blanco as Jacob Dimagiba
- Jordan Herrera as Ivan Sanchez
- Deniesse Joaquin as Jaqueline "Jinky"
- Alexandra Macanan as Giselle L. Crisostomo
- Jon Lucas as Eugene Cantada
- Lance Angelo Lucido as Peter Ledesma

=== Guest cast ===
- Ahron Villena as Eric Ledesma
- Bianca Manalo as Mabel Romero
- Lloyd Samartino as Philip Ledesma
- Coco Martin as Bus Passenger
- Precious Lara Quigaman as Olga
- Koreen Medina as Odette

== Reruns ==
The show aired re-runs on Jeepney TV from March 10 to April 4, 2025 and September 7 to November 13, 2026.

== Reception ==
Kantar Media National TV Ratings (5:30 PM PST)
Pilot Episode	Finale Episode	Peak	Average
25.5% January 28, 2013	N/A; April 12, 2013	N/A	N/A

== Soundtrack ==
Kahit Konting Pagtingin (The Official Soundtrack)

Soundtrack album by Angeline Quinto, Sam Milby and Paulo Avelino
- Released: 2013
- Genre: P-pop
- Length: 42:47
- Label: Star Music
- Producers: Jonathan Manalo, Rox Santos

No.	Title	Artist(s)	Length
1.	"Kahit Konting Pagtingin"	Angeline Quinto	3:09
2.	"Pusong Lito"	Angeline Quinto	4:02
3.	"Hindi Kita Iiwan"	Sam Milby	3:52
4.	"Hiling"	Paulo Avelino	4:48
5.	"Kahit Konting Pagtingin (trio version)"	Angeline Quinto, Sam Milby and Paulo Avelino	3:21
6.	"Tanging Ikaw"	Angeline Quinto	2:22
7.	"Kahit Konting Pagtingin (alternate version)"	Angeline Quinto	3:00

Additional tracks (minus one)
No.	Title	Artist(s)	Length
8.	"Kahit Konting Pagtingin (minus one)"	Angeline Quinto	3:09
9.	"Pusong Lito (minus one)"	Angeline Quinto	4:02
10.	"Hindi Kita Iiwan (minus one)"	Sam Milby	3:52
11.	"Hiling (minus one)"	Paulo Avelino	4:48
12.	"Tanging Ikaw (minus one)"	Angeline Quinto	2:22

== See also ==
- List of programs broadcast by ABS-CBN
- List of ABS-CBN Studios original drama series
- List of programs broadcast by Jeepney TV
