= Sana Bukas Pa ang Kahapon =

- Title card
- Also known as: Tomorrow Belongs to Me; Attack on Chocolate
- Genre: Family; Melodrama; Romance
- Created by: Rondel P. Lindayag; Reggie Amigo
- Developed by: ABS-CBN Studios
- Written by: Philip King; Keavy Eunice Vicente; Reggie Amigo; Emille Joson (dialogue)
- Directed by: Jerome C. Pobocan; Trina N. Dayrit
- Creative director: Johnny delos Santos
- Starring: Bea Alonzo; Paulo Avelino; Maricar Reyes; Albert Martinez
- Narrated by: Bea Alonzo as Rose
- Opening theme: "Sana Bukas Pa ang Kahapon" by Angeline Quinto
- Composer: George Canseco
- Country of origin: Philippines
- Original language: Filipino
- No. of episodes: 85 (list of episodes)

Production
- Executive producers: Carlo Katigbak; Cory Vidanes; Laurenti Dyogi; Roldeo T. Endrinal
- Producers: Jennifer Soliman-Bolalin; Emerald C. Suarez; Julie Anne R. Benitez
- Production locations: N. Bacalso Ave, Cebu City, Philippines; Metro Manila, Philippines
- Editor: Jay Mendoza
- Running time: 30–36 minutes
- Production company: Dreamscape Entertainment Television

Original release
- Network: ABS-CBN
- Release: June 16 – October 10, 2014

Sana Bukas Pa ang Kahapon (International title: Tomorrow Belongs to Me / transl. I wish tomorrow was yesterday) is a 2014 Philippine television drama melodrama television series broadcast by ABS-CBN. Based on a 1983 Philippine film of the same title. Directed by Jerome C. Pobocan and Trina N. Dayrit, it stars Bea Alonzo, Paulo Avelino, Maricar Reyes, and Albert Martinez. It aired on the network's Primetime Bida line up and worldwide on TFC from June 16 to October 10, 2014 replacing The Legal Wife and was replaced by Two Wives.

== Synopsis ==
The story revolves around two women, who will be united by fate and their hunger to seek truth and justice - Emmanuelle, a feisty lawyer; and Rose, the kindhearted heiress of the Buena Criollo chocolate company, who will be accused of a crime she did not commit.

== Cast and characters ==
=== Main cast ===
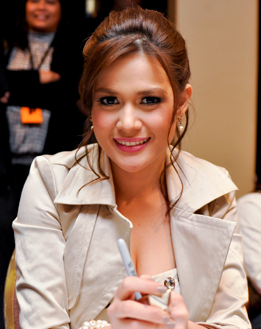
Bea Alonzo portrays Rose Buenavista-Salvador & Atty. Emmanuelle Gaspar-Romero

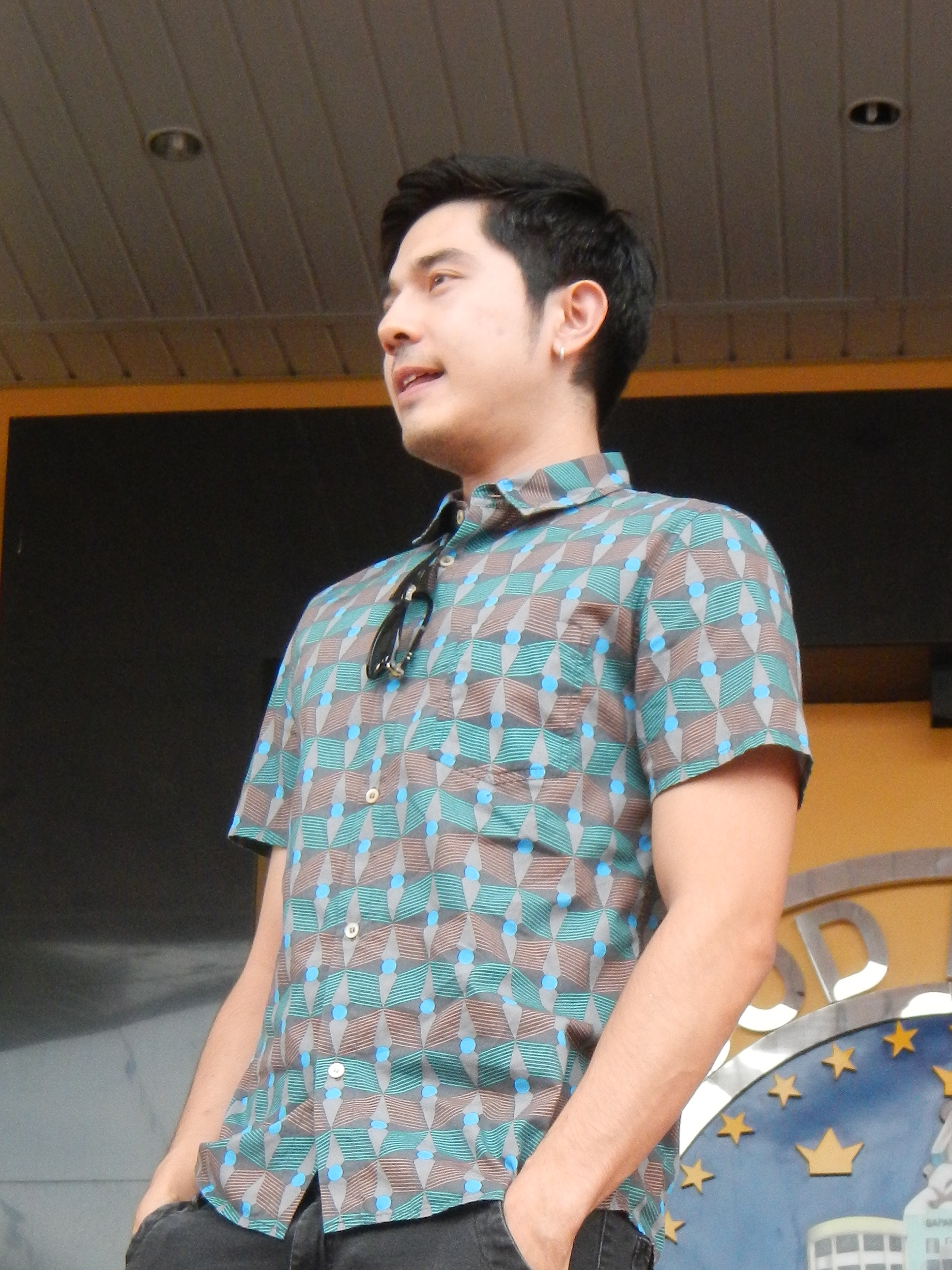
Paulo Avelino portrays Patrick Salvador

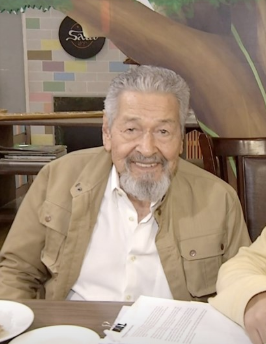
Eddie Garcia portrays Magno Ruiz

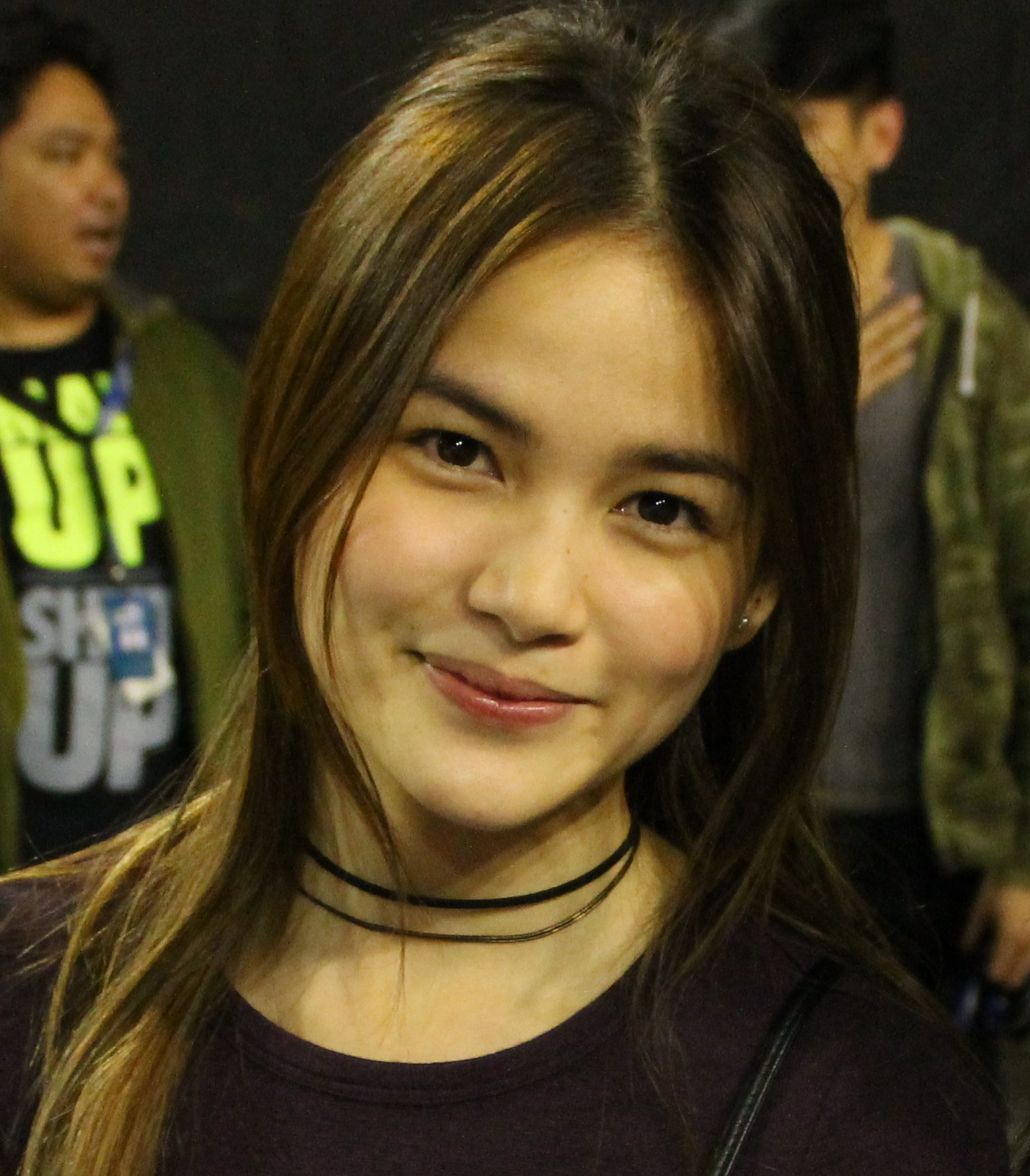
Elisse Joson portrays Erica as Guest Episode.

- Bea Alonzo as Rose Buenavista-Salvador / Atty. Emmanuelle Gaspar-Romero - Rose is the loving, understanding, intelligent, and shy daughter of Henry Buenavista. She is groomed to take over her family's chocolate company, Buena Criollo. She has everything any person would desire: a loving family, wealth, and power. All of these she possesses but one thing - beauty. Rose has yet to have a boyfriend at the age of 25. But she soon falls in love with a chocolatier named Patrick. The two get married and live a happy life together starting a family. When her life seems to be at its best, Rose faces a tragedy when she is accused of killing her father, Henry. She gets imprisoned for a crime that she didn't commit. She tries to prove her innocence with the help of a lawyer named Emmanuelle. Emmanuelle is the complete opposite of Rose: feisty, outgoing, and confident. She is married and has a son. Rose and Emmanuelle then get involved in a tragic accident when the car they were riding exploded. Rose survives while Emmanuelle dies. Rose assumes the role of Emmanuelle, and started a connivance with Ruth to pretend as Emmanuelle and take her role in their family. She becomes confident, feisty, and most of all beautiful. When she pretends to be Emmanuelle she seeks to find justice for the death of her father, while also getting revenge on all those who hurt her, especially the love of her life Patrick. In the end, Rose reconciles with everyone and even reunites with Patrick, once again.
- Paulo Avelino as Patrick Salvador - A chocolatier of Rose's company. At first, he started a connivance with Sasha in order to pay for his grandmother's medical bills. Their goal was to manipulate and distract Rose so that she would be unfocused on her work in Buena Criollo, and Sasha could prove to Henry her worth. He started to befriend Rose, and eventually fell in love with her. He felt guilty because of his plans with Sasha and decided to end his connection with her. The things that differ Patrick from other men is that he loves Rose because he loves her personality, and doesn't care about how she looks like. He and Rose then get married and start a life together. His world turns upside down when Rose gets convicted for a crime that she didn't commit. Things become even worst when the love of his life dies in a tragic accident. Patrick finds it hard to move on from Rose's death, even when Sasha tries to make him fall for her. He and Sasha then spend a night together, and he eventually gets her pregnant. He decided to take responsibility of everything and married Sasha even though he harbored no feelings for her. A new face then enters his life - Emmanuelle Romero, a lawyer. He finds the love for Rose in Emmanuelle and falls for her too, not knowing that she is really Rose. He then finds out that Emmanuelle is Rose and they completely reconcile with her. In the end, he and Rose renew their lives together.
- Maricar Reyes as Sasha Bayle - One of the two main antagonists. She is Rose's stepsister, who has a secret desire for Patrick. Sasha envies Rose for having everything that she ever wanted. She is an accountant in Rose's company. She started a connivance with Patrick to make sure that Rose would get distracted with her role as the CEO of Buena Criollo. Her plan was to replace Rose as the president of their company and prove herself to Henry, her stepfather, that she is worthy to be part of the Buenavista family. Sasha later became so jealous of Rose when Patrick fell in love with her, because she is also in love with Patrick. All her life, she has been seeking for a complete family because she grew up without a father, and Henry never treated her like his own, but as an outsider instead. After Rose's death, she seduces Patrick and gets pregnant. She marries him and they start a family. When she finally thinks everything is okay, her past comes back. Rose, who is now Emmanuelle, starts her revenge and makes her life miserable and gives the taste of her own medicine. She loses everything one by one, starting from Patrick. Sasha makes it her purpose to destroy Emmanuelle because she believes that Patrick is falling in love with her as she resembles Rose. She then connived with Carlos in order to get revenge on Rose. Sasha then regrets everything she's done and becomes an ally of Rose and Patrick. She then seeks forgiveness from Rose, and completely reforms. She attempted to help Rose and Patrick escape from Carlos' hands. In the end, she dies in a car explosion with Carlos when a bomb is planted in their car.
- Albert Martinez. as Leo Romero - Emmanuelle's husband. He is one of the major businessmen in the Buenavista family's rival chocolate company. He desires to spend more time with Emmanuelle because she is so busy in her work. Leo feels that he and his son are neglected by Emmanuelle. He tries to be the best husband to Emmanuelle, and the greatest father to his son, Francisco Miguel, also known as Kit. He is one of Rose's allies. He blames Rose for what happened to Emmanuelle. When he found out that Emmanuelle is actually Rose, he is shuttered by anger and grief after finding out that Emmanuelle was the one who actually died. But he eventually forgives Rose and helps her pursue all of her plans. Leo, too, then started falling in love for Rose, but decided to give way to Patrick knowing that he is the one that Rose truly loves. Rose treats him like a good friend and he values their friendship. In the finale, he goes abroad with Kit to start a new life.
- Susan Roces as Ruth Gaspar - Emmanuelle's grandmother. She was the one who raised Emmanuelle after her parents died. She owns the rival company to Rose's chocolate company, Prestige Chocolates. Initially, she is the only one who knew that Emmanuelle was dead. Ruth believed that Rose is innocent, so she decided to let Rose have Emmanuelle's face. She is one of Rose's allies in getting revenge on all those who hurt her. Like many people in Rose's life, Ruth has her own secrets too. She blames Magno (Rose's grandfather) for the deaths of her son and daughter-in-law, Emmanuel and Alicia. After many years, she stills holds the grudge against him. She then forgives Magno. In the end, she goes abroad with Kit and Leo to find a new life.
- Anita Linda as Patrice "Lola Patchi" Salvador - Patrick's grandmother with diabetes. She is the reason why Patrick started a connivance with Sasha because he needed to pay for her medical bills. She is extremely opinionated, especially on Patrick's choices of women. Later in the series, she discovers that she is infected with the deadly Alzheimer's disease which causes her trouble in remembering stuff, including where she lives. Patchi dislikes Sasha for Patrick because she believes that she is a rude woman. She likes Rose much more for Patrick because she is loving. She is the mother of Helena, Patrick's late mother.
- Eddie Garcia as PS/Insp. Magno "Lolo Magno" Ruiz - Rose and Violet's grandfather, and Jasmine's (Rose and Violet’s mother) father. He is a retired policeman. He specialized in cases, which involved kidnap for ransom. Magno had a connection with Ruth many years ago. He was helping them get Emmanuelle back, who was kidnapped for money. He did not follow the orders correctly and went ahead without following directions. Because of this, the police and the kidnappers had a shootout. Ruth blamed him for the death of her son Emmanuel and her daughter-in-law Alicia. He is a good grandfather of Rose and Violet. After Rose died, Violet felt alone so Magno and her spent more quality time together. Laura is jealous of him because she feels that Violet loves him more than her. Even after Rose died, he is persistent to find the truth and seeks justice for what happened to Rose. Magno wants to prove that Rose isn't a criminal - but a victim of a crime. He is completely rejoiced when he found out that Rose is actually alive. Eventually, he makes peace with Ruth and asks for her forgiveness.
- Tonton Gutierrez as Carlos "Muerte" Syquia / Carlos Ramos - Henry Buenavista's right-hand-man. He is Ernesto Ramos' son, who is one of the co-founders of Buena Criollo. He seeks vengeance for his father and blames Henry and Ruth for his death. He is one of the main reasons why Rose's life became a living hell. He killed Henry in a confrontation and framed Rose. He desires to take over the Buenavista family's empire and run Buena Criollo as his own company. He is manipulative and scheming, and also unmerciful. He has a son named Sebastian. Carlos hates Rose because he believes that she is the reason why all of his plans have failed. Carlos is actually the mastermind of the accident that Rose and Emmanuelle met. He is actually Emmanuelle's kidnapper and the reason why Emmanuel and Alicia died. Carlos did this because he wanted to get revenge on Ruth because he believed that she is the reason why his father became depressed, and eventually committed suicide. He later reveals that he is Sasha's biological father and promises to make up everything for her. He killed Sasha's boyfriend, Gerald, because he hurt Sasha. He married Laura to be able to adopt Violet and get her money. Towards the end of the series, he became even more desperate to lure Rose to him he decided to kidnap Violet. He fostered a fake name, "Muerte", which he used as a codename. He tortured her until Rose would finally arrive. He ordered someone to kill Rose, but his plans failed and ended shooting Patrick. He orders Sasha to make Rose and Patrick come to him. What he doesn't know is that Sasha is already an ally to Rose. He tied up Rose and Patrick to bomb and attempted to kill them, but they escaped. In the end, he and Sasha die in a car explosion when a bomb was placed in the trunk of their vehicle.
- Dina Bonnevie Laura Bayle-Buenavista / Laura Bayle-Syquia - She is Rose and Violet's stepmother, and Sasha's mother. She is Henry Buenavista's second wife. She was his former secretary, and people consider her as a "gold-digger". She wants to be a mother to Rose and Violet but they always reject her because they feel that no one can replace Jasmine. Sasha does not believe that Laura married Henry just for love - but also for his money. She always denies this to Sasha. After Rose's death, she constantly attempts to reach out to Violet but she still cannot accept her as a mother. Laura is a bit jealous of Magno because she feels that he is creating a wedge between her and Violet. She also believes that he is the reason why Violet cannot accept her. She and Carlos then try to take over Buena Criollo, and are shocked when a new face pops into the company. And this woman is Rose who is now known as Emmanuelle. She is one of the people who Rose gets revenge on. Laura married Carlos so that she can adopt Violet for two things - her love and wealth. She later finds out that Emmanuelle is actually Rose. Later, she seeks forgiveness to Rose for everything that she has done. Rose forgives her but makes her leave their home. She becomes an accomplice of Rose and Patrick in destroying Carlos.

=== Supporting cast ===
- Francis Magundayao as Sebastian Syquia - He is Carlos' son with another woman. He was raised by his father and he idolizes him. Sebastian doesn't know Carlos' true colors and always defends him against people who try to destroy his image. He later found out that he is actually Sasha's younger half-brother. He had a crush on Violet, his new stepsister. He later helped Sasha save Violet from Carlos' evil plans. He became an ally with Rose to destroy Carlos once and for all.
- Michelle Vito as Violet B. Syquia - Rose's younger sister and Sasha's stepsister. She is Jasmine and Henry's youngest daughter. After their mother's death, Rose took the role as the mother of the family and became especially close to Violet. She is loving, kind, and understanding like her sister. She becomes depressed after Rose's sudden death. Several times Laura has tried to become a mother to her but Violet persistently rejected her because she only saw her as a stepmother and not a real mother. She became even closer to Magno, which caused Laura's jealousy. She thinks Emmanuelle is crazy because she is always following her around. Violet then started trusting Sasha and Laura and treated them like her real family. At first, she hated Emmanuelle because she is Patrick's "mistress" against Sasha. She then got adopted by Laura and Carlos to get her inheritance from Henry. Later on, she finds out that Rose is actually Emmanuelle. Violet got kidnapped by Carlos but was later saved. She now lives peacefully with Magno and Rose.
- Miguel Vergara as Francisco Miguel "Kit" Romero - He is Emmanuelle and Leo's only child and son. He is very close to his mom. He didn't know that Emmanuelle died and that Rose is only pretending as his mother. Kit and Rose become close and Rose treats him like a real son. He later got mad at Rose when he founded out that she had a relationship with Patrick. He later forgives Rose, and she continues to be his mother. In the end of the series, he, Ruth, and Leo go abroad with Rose, and she still continues to be a mother to him.
- Rocky Gomez - played by Nikki Valdez. Rose's inmate while she was in prison. She is one of Carlos' employees in his illegal business as "Muerte". She helped Rose escape prison and was involved in Carlos' plan to kill Rose and Emmanuelle. She is involved in Carlos' syndicate and manipulated Rose in thinking that she is her friend. Rocky later admits to Magno that she was an accomplice in killing Emmanuelle and Rose, so that she can finally reunite with her child.
- Gerald - played by Joem Bascon. Sasha's ex-boyfriend. He is head-over-heels in love with Sasha and will do anything to make her be in love with him. He is actually the biological father of Sasha's daughter, Martina. He is jealous of Patrick because Sasha is in love with him, and he is madly in love with her. He will do anything to make Sasha be a part of his life - no matter how bad or evil it is. Gerald follows all of Sasha's orders and does everything that she orders him to do. He attempted to eliminate Emmanuelle so that Sasha will be satisfied. He is Sasha's eyes and ears, and she orders him to find out all of Patrick's secrets so that she could manipulate him to staying with her. Sasha told Carlos that she wanted Gerald out of his life. In order to get rid of him, Carlos killed him much to Sasha's detriment. All she wanted was Gerald to be out of her life and to not bother her, but never wanted him dead.
- Yaya Divine - played by Malou Crisologo. She is the loyal maid and nanny of the Buenavista family. She was Rose and Violet's nanny and servant for Henry. She is very close to Rose and Violet and treats them like her own children. Divine later finds out that Rose is actually alive and is now known as Emmanuelle.

=== Guest cast ===
- Jong Cuenco as Anton Abueva
- Junjun Nayra as Atty. Ernesto Iglesias

=== Special participation ===
- Chinggoy Alonzo as Henry Buenavista - Rose and Violet's father. He is one of the founders of Buena Criollo who built his company to be the best. He started off as a cacao farmer and built Buena Criollo with the help of Ruth. Henry is a loving father, who entrusts the future of their chocolate company in the hands to three people - Rose, his eldest daughter; Sasha, his stepdaughter; or Carlos, his trustful right-hand-man. During his youth he married Jasmine Ruiz, who is the love of his life. Years after her death, he marries his secretary, Laura Bayle, and inherits a stepdaughter named Sasha. He never treated Sasha like his own and always forgot about her. He dies after falling out of their office building during a confrontation with Carlos. His death is the beginning for Rose's misery in her life.
- Precious Lara Quigaman as Jasmine Ruiz-Buenavista - Henry's first wife. She is Rose and Violet's mother as well as Magno's only child. She is a loving and dutiful mother who studied abroad. Although she studied abroad, she decided to be a housewife to fulfill the duties of a wife and mother. She later dies due to an illness. Rose takes up the mother role to Violet and Henry.
- Eula Valdez as Helena Salvador - Patrick's mother and Patchi's late daughter.
- Dominic Ochoa as Emmanuel Gaspar - Emmanuelle's father and Ruth's son. He is one of the major people in Ruth's chocolate company, Prestige Chocolates. He seeks help from Magno to help them get back Emmanuelle from her kidnappers. During the shootout between the kidnappers and police, no one survives but Emmanuelle. This results in Emmanuel's death, which causes Ruth's anger against Magno.
- Dimples Romana as Alicia Del Mundo-Gaspar - Emmanuel's wife and Emmanuelle's mother. She also seeks help from Magno to get Emmanuelle back from Muerte, her kidnapper. She later dies during the shootout between the kidnappers and the police. No one survived but Emmanuelle.
- Bembol Roco as Fidel de Guzman - A police commander chief in the police station where Magno used to work. He hates being bossed around by Magno because he is already a retired police and is no longer in service. He and Magno often argue and he refuses to listen whenever new evidence appears about Rose's death and why it occurred.
- William Lorenzo as Ernesto Ramos - He is the third person who established Buena Criollo. He was kicked out of the company by Ruth and Henry because he was caught embezzling money from their business. He has a son named Carlos, who becomes the root of all of their problems because he is seeking vengeance for his death. Carlos believes that he is innocent. Ernesto became depressed commits suicide afterwards.

== Reception ==
KANTAR MEDIA NATIONAL TV RATINGS (9:30PM PST)
PILOT EPISODE	FINALE EPISODE	PEAK	AVERAGE	SOURCE
21.7%	27.3%	27.3%	24.5%	

== Production ==
The first choice for the role of Sasha was KC Concepcion but decided to refuse. The second choice was Iza Calzado but faced contract issues for the final casting; she was later replaced by Maricar Reyes.

== Soundtrack ==
On June 30, 2014, Star Records Inc. officially released the Sana Bukas Pa ang Kahapon (The Official Soundtrack) and is now available in physical and digital formats in various music stores. All the songs from the official soundtrack album of the series are performed by Angeline Quinto.

=== Track listing ===
No.	Title	Length
1.	"Gusto Kita"	4:48
2.	"Why Can't It Be"	3:47
3.	"Umiiyak ang Puso"	4:51
4.	"Someday"	3:47
5.	"Wherever You Are"	4:46
6.	"Hindi Ko Kaya"	5:04
7.	"Muli"	4:37
8.	"Forever (duet with Erik Santos)"	4:01
9.	"Sana Bukas Pa ang Kahapon"	4:59

Additional tracks (minus one)
No.	Title	Length
10.	"Gusto Kita (minus one)"	4:47
11.	"Why Can't It Be (minus one)"	3:50
12.	"Umiiyak ang Puso (minus one)"	4:51
13.	"Someday (minus one)"	3:47
14.	"Wherever You Are (minus one)"	4:46
15.	"Hindi Ko Kaya (minus one)"	5:04
16.	"Muli (minus one)"	4:37
17.	"Forever (duet with Erik Santos) (minus one)"	4:01
18.	"Sana Bukas Pa ang Kahapon (minus one)"	4:57

== Re-runs ==
The show began airing re-runs on Jeepney TV from October 22 to December 14, 2018 (replacing the re-runs of Tayong Dalawa); December 2, 2019 to January 31, 2020 (replacing the re-runs of Rubi 2010); April 25 to June 17, 2022 (replacing the re-runs of Huwag Ka Lang Mawawala); and August 3 to September 25, 2026 (replacing the re-runs of Hanggang Saan).

== See also ==
- List of programs broadcast by ABS-CBN
- List of ABS-CBN Studios original drama series
