= Got to Believe =

2013–14 Philippine television romantic comedy drama series

- Title card
- Genre: Romance; Drama; Comedy
- Created by: ABS-CBN Studios; Henry King Quitain; Olivia Lamasan
- Developed by: ABS-CBN Studios
- Written by: Mark Duane Angos; Jay Fernando; Ceres Helga Barrios; Marie Ann Dimaculangan-Fampulme
- Directed by: Cathy Garcia-Molina
- Starring: Kathryn Bernardo; Daniel Padilla
- Opening theme: "Got to Believe in Magic" by Juris
- Composers: Charles Fox; Stephen Geyer
- Country of origin: Philippines
- Original language: Filipino
- No. of seasons: 2
- No. of episodes: 140

Production
- Executive producers: Carlo Katigbak; Cory Vidanes; Laurenti Dyogi; Malou Santos
- Producers: Mylene H. Ongkiko; Des Tanwangco
- Production locations: Philippines; Singapore
- Editors: Roman Rodriguez; Rizaldy Mora; Joshua Ducasen; Gerald Garcia
- Running time: 30-45 minutes Monday - Friday at 20:45 (PST)
- Production company: Star Creatives

Original release
- Network: ABS-CBN
- Release: August 26, 2013 – March 7, 2014

Got to Believe is a Philippine television drama romantic series broadcast by ABS-CBN. Directed by Cathy Garcia-Molina, it stars Kathryn Bernardo and Daniel Padilla. It aired on the network's Primetime Bida line up and worldwide on TFC from August 26, 2013 to March 7, 2014, replacing Huwag Ka Lang Mawawala and was replaced by Ikaw Lamang. The series finale, dubbed as the Best Ending Ever, was ranked #1 by Kantar Media nationwide TV rating.

== Synopsis ==
=== Season 1 ===
As young Chichay (Kathryn Bernardo) unexpectedly met young Joaquin (Daniel Padilla) in their family-owned amusement fair, she taught him to believe that magic exists. However, their friendship abruptly ended as Chichay's family moved to the province while Joaquin had an almost-fatal accident which prevented him from living a normal life. Ten years later, they have literally bumped into each other but never had any idea about their childhood past.

Despite living a comfortable and wealthy life, teenage Joaquin feels he is different due to his brain injury. His overprotective mother, Juliana (Carmina Villaroel), unknowingly hired a teenage Chichay as his nanny. The two that had started off having an unpleasant relationship with each other eventually became friends. As they found comfort in each other's company, they learned various lessons in life such as the true meaning of friendship, standing by your family, and of accepting one's self. While their feelings blossomed into love, things also got complicated and put them to the test as they encountered numerous conflicts like their parents' past, their economic gap and the cause of Joaquin's accident when he was young.

=== Season 2 ===
The second season began with the episode aptly entitled "The New Chapter", which takes place two years after the events of the first season with both lead characters already living a different life respectively. New challenges and additional conflicts occur for most of the characters while the major plot from the previous season unravels to the storyline. Extensively used to promote the show was the tagline -- "The heart remembers what the mind forgets."

Alex (Liza Soberano) was a major addition to the cast in a pivotal role. It also marks that the series was filmed and used Singapore on some of its episodes having Chichay and Joaquin on several tourist spots in the country.

== Cast and characters ==
=== Main cast ===
- Kathryn Bernardo as Christina Carlota "Chichay / Care Bear” Tampipi
- Daniel Padilla as Joaquin "Wacky Boy / Ryan / Gummy Bear" S. Manansala

=== Supporting cast ===
- Manilyn Reynes as Elizabeth "Betchay / Teddy Bear / Mama Bear" Tampipi
- Carmina Villaroel as Juliana San Juan-Manansala
- Ian Veneracion as Jaime "Bunny Bear" Manansala
- Benjie Paras as Chito "Papa Bear" Tampipi
- Joonee Gamboa as Francisco "Lolo Isko" Tampipi
- Chinggoy Alonzo as Ronaldo San Juan
- Minnie Aguilar as Matilda Cristobal-Pantoja
- Lou Veloso as Mang During Pantoja
- Al Tantay as Tatay Poro
- Iya Villania as Florence Marie Tampipi
- Thara Jordana as Emma
- Janice Jurado as Rona Manansala
- Nina Ricci Alagao as Gigi Galvez
- Beverly Salviejo as Tarantina
- Cecil Paz as Madam Fifi
- Hyubs Azarcon as Whitey
- Ethyl Osorio as Ethel
- Benjamin Domingo as Bubbles
- Darwin "Hap Rice" Tolentino as Nanoy
- Mhyco Aquino as Jericho "Jec-Jec" Manansala
- Irma Adlawan as Yaya Puring
- Ping Medina as Asiong

=== Recurring cast ===
- Isabel Granada as Tessa Velasquez-Zaragosa
- Jojo A. as George Zaragosa
- Alexander Diaz as Kristoffer "Kit" Rosales
- as Pique Nazareno
- Luke Conde as Michael "Mik" Sajone
- Kristel Fulgar as Editha "Didith" Pantoja
- Trina "Hopia" Legaspi as Lindsay Bernal
- Angeli Gonzales as Miley Rodriguez Handcuff
- Jon Lucas as Dominic Zaragosa
- Yves Flores as Pedro
- Miguel Morales as Miguel
- Joy Viado as Prof. Henrietta Ilagan Velasco
- Niña Dolino as Professor Aira Jean
- Chienna Filomeno as Amanda Lopez
- Rolando Inocencio as Dean Chuppongco
- Jess Mendoza as Anthony "Tinyong"
- Ingrid dela Paz as Patricia Reyes
- Liza Soberano as Alexa "Alex" Rodriguez
- Zild Benitez as Joaquin's schoolmate

=== Guest cast ===
- Kyle Banzon as young Joaquin
- Bianca Bentulan as young Chichay
- Bobby Andrews as Rodrigo San Juan
- Ya Chang as Nanny Agency Manager
- Lilia Cuntapay† as Yaya Liling
- Emmanuelle Vera as Marga
- Ryan Boyce as Jerver
- Manuel Chua as Mr. Funye
- Ronnie Magsanoc as Coach Frank
- Jeron Teng as Allen Chua
- Atoy Co as Coach Atoy
- Tetchie Agbayani as Madam Lucille
- Paolo Serrano as Armand Pantay
- Marissa Sanchez as Dean Leonora Pura
- Christopher de Leon as Dominic's uncle
- Minco Fabregas as Attorney Sarabia
- AG Saño as A.G.
- Kitkat as Betty
- Lloyd Samartino as Alex's father
- Lassy Marquez as himself
- Negi as himself

== Production ==
=== Premiere ===
Initially, Got to Believe was originally planned to be premiered back-to-back with Muling Buksan ang Puso on July 8, 2013, replacing Apoy sa Dagat and Missing You. But due to the request of Koreanovela fans, the series was later postponed because of That Winter, the Wind Blows. After the delayed airing, the series aired on August 26, 2013, replacing Huwag Ka Lang Mawawala.

=== Casting ===
This Kapamilya series is a reunion project of 80's generation actresses Manilyn Reynes, Isabel Granada and Carmina Villaroel alongside teen idols Benjie Paras, Jojo A. and Ian Veneracion.

== Music ==
The theme song "Got to Believe in Magic", written by Charles Fox and Stephen Geyer, was originally sung by American singer David Pomeranz as a soundtrack for the 1982 film Zapped!. It was later included on his compilation album Born for You: His Best and More that was released on July 19, 1999. The album was recorded in the Philippines and co-produced by Pomeranz with Filipino composer Lorrie Ilustre. The song was a popular hit within the country during the time of the album's release. It was also covered by Filipino band Side A and used as a theme song for the 2002 Filipino romance film Got 2 Believe.

Due to the song's previous usage in the film, director Cathy Garcia-Molina clarified that the television drama and movie were completely different. The rendition featured within the show is sung by Filipino singer Juris.

Another song which was a success, especially in the Philippines, was "Ikaw Na Na Na" sung by G2B Boys.

Got to Believe

Soundtrack album by Various artists
- Released: December 10, 2013
- Recorded: 2013
- Genres: Pop, OPM
- Length: 62:54
- Label: Star Music

No.	Title	Artist	Length
1.	"Got to Believe in Magic (acoustic)"	Juris	4:32
2.	"My Only Love"	Marion Aunor	3:47
3.	"Pagdating ng Panahon"	Kathryn Bernardo	4:50
4.	"Kasama Kang Tumanda"	Daniel Padilla	2:45
5.	"Kahit Maputi Na ang Buhok Ko"	Daniel Padilla	3:18
6.	"Got to Believe in Magic"	Daniel Padilla and Kathryn Bernardo	4:15
7.	"Ikaw Na Na Na Na (disco version)"	G2B	3:00
8.	"Ikaw Na Na Na Na (acoustic version)"	G2B	6:31

Additional tracks (minus one)
No.	Title	Artist	Length
1.	"Got to Believe in Magic (acoustic version) (instrumental)"	Juris	4:32
2.	"My Only Love (instrumental)"	Marion Aunor	3:47
3.	"Pagdating ng Panahon (instrumental)"	Kathryn Bernardo	4:50
4.	"Kasama Kang Tumanda (instrumental)"	Daniel Padilla	2:45
5.	"Kahit Maputi Na ang Buhok Ko (instrumental)"	Daniel Padilla	3:18
6.	"Got to Believe in Magic (instrumental)"	Daniel Padilla and Kathryn Bernardo	4:15
7.	"Ikaw Na Na Na Na (disco version) (instrumental)"	G2B	3:00
8.	"Ikaw Na Na Na Na (acoustic version) (instrumental)"	G2B	6:29

== Reception ==
=== Ratings ===
KANTAR MEDIA NATIONAL TV RATINGS (8:45 PM PST)
PILOT EPISODE	FINALE EPISODE	PEAK	AVERAGE	SOURCE
34.0%	38.6%	38.6%	36.4%	

=== Fanbase and merchandise ===
Due to the series' high popularity, it gained a fan base called G2B Army. The series also started releasing different Got to Believe merchandises like covers for tablets, hoodies, and shirts thru B.U.M. Equipment.

== Reruns ==
Reruns of the show's episodes air on Jeepney TV.

On March 18, 2020, ABS-CBN announced that Got to Believe will have a rerun starting March 23, 2020, via the network's Kapamilya Gold afternoon block, taking the timeslot previously occupied by Sandugo which had recently wrapped up, with the said timeslot originally intended for Ang sa Iyo ay Akin, as part of ABS-CBN's temporary programming changes due to the COVID-19 pandemic. This rerun was abruptly cut due to the temporary closure of ABS-CBN following the cease and desist order issued by the National Telecommunications Commission on account of its franchise expiration.

All episodes highlights of Got To Believe is currently uploaded on ABS-CBN Entertainment YouTube Channel, along with Walang Hanggan, 100 Days to Heaven and May Bukas Pa.

== See also ==
- List of programs broadcast by ABS-CBN
- List of ABS-CBN Studios original drama series
- List of programs broadcast by Jeepney TV
