= Bum =

Bum or bums may refer to:

== Slang ==
- Buttocks, two rounded portions of the anatomy on the posterior of the pelvic region of many bipeds or quadrupeds
- A lazy person
- A homeless person
- Bum a cigarette or a "smoke", meaning to ask for without intention to pay

== Places ==
- Bum, Afghanistan, several locales
- Bum, Azerbaijan, a village
- Bum Chiefdom, Bonthe District, Sierra Leone

== People ==
=== Nickname ===
- Bum (dog) (1886–1898), an American stray dog
- Bum Bright (1920–2004), American businessman
- Bum Farto (1919–1986), American fire chief and drug dealer
- Bum Krüger (1906–1971), German actor
- Lee McClung (1870–1914), football player and 22nd Treasurer of the United States
- Bum Phillips (1923–2013), American football coach

=== Given name ===
- Kim Bum (born 1989), South Korean actor
- Woo Bum-kon, South Korean spree killer and mass murderer

=== Surname ===
- Khem Bahadur Bum, Nepalese politician elected in 2008
- Lili Fröhlich-Bum (1886–1981), Austrian art historian
- Narendra Bahadur Bum, Nepalese politician elected in 1999

== Other ==
- Bachelor of Unani Medicine and Surgery, see Unani medicine#Education and recognition
- Bums, nickname for Brooklyn Dodgers baseball team
- B.U.M. Equipment, US clothing brand
- Bum language, spoken in Cameroon
- ISO 639 code for the Bulu language, in Cameroon
- Breguet Bre.4 or BUM, French World War I bomber

== See also ==
- The B.U.M.S. (Brothas Unda Madness), American hip hop duo
- Bum Bum (disambiguation)
- Bumb (disambiguation)
