= Bum Bum (disambiguation) =

"Bum Bum" is a 2015 song by R&B singer Kat DeLuna featuring Trey Songz.

Bum Bum may also refer to:

== Songs ==
- "Bum Bum", a 2000 single by Italo dance group Mabel
- "Bum Bum", a 2015 single by soca artist Kevin Lyttle featuring Mya
- "Bum Bum", a 2018 single by afropop singer Yemi Alade
- "The Bum Bum Song" (1999), a shortened title of Tom Green's hit song Lonely Swedish

== Other ==
- Miss Bumbum

== See also ==
- Bum (disambiguation)
- Buttocks
