= Rainbow Rumble =

Philippine television game show

- Genre: Trivia; Game show
- Created by: ABS-CBN Corporation (Note: Credits as per the show's closing credits.); 3nithink Productions; Willy Cuevas
- Directed by: John Prats
- Creative director: Willy Cuevas
- Presented by: Luis Manzano; Negi
- Starring: Rainbow Pop Girls; The Rumblers
- Narrated by: Peter Musñgi
- Theme music composer: Willie Cuevas
- Opening theme: "Color Clash" by WRIVE
- Country of origin: Philippines
- Original language: Filipino
- No. of seasons: 2
- No. of episodes: 106

Production
- Executive producers: Carlo Katigbak; Cory Vidanes; Laurenti Dyogi; Luis Andrada
- Producer: Olivia Zarate
- Production locations: Studio 2, ABS-CBN Broadcasting Center, Sgt. Esguerra Avenue cor. Mother Ignacia Avenue, Brgy. South Triangle, Quezon City, Metro Manila, Philippines
- Running time: 75 minutes (2024–2025); 60 minutes (2025–2026)
- Production companies: ABS-CBN Studios; 3nithink Productions

Original release
- Network: Kapamilya Channel; A2Z (Note: The show is also available online via Kapamilya Online Live on Facebook and YouTube. It is also available on-demand via iWant and internationally via The Filipino Channel.)
- Release: July 20, 2024 – March 23, 2025
- Network: TV5
- Release: July 20, 2024 – March 23, 2025
- Network: All TV
- Release: June 28, 2025 – April 12, 2026

Rainbow Rumble is a Philippine television game show broadcast by Kapamilya Channel. Hosted by Luis Manzano and Negi, contestants compete in a game of luck and strategy for a ₱ 1 million grand prize.

The series premiered for two seasons, with the first season airing on Yes Weekend from July 20, 2024 to March 23, 2025, and the second season airing from June 28, 2025 to April 12, 2026.

== Background ==
Back on October 14, 2023, ABS-CBN aired its short-lived program It's Your Lucky Day, airing merely 12 days. One of said segments was "Pot Luck", whereas five contestants are randomly picked and answered one of a set of 100 trivia-based questions of varying difficulties from a pot, and the contestant who first getting three correct answers wins the game. It's Your Lucky Day indefinitely ceased production 12 days later under the instruction of the Movie and Television Review and Classification Board (MTRCB).

== Gameplay ==
=== Rally to the Top ===
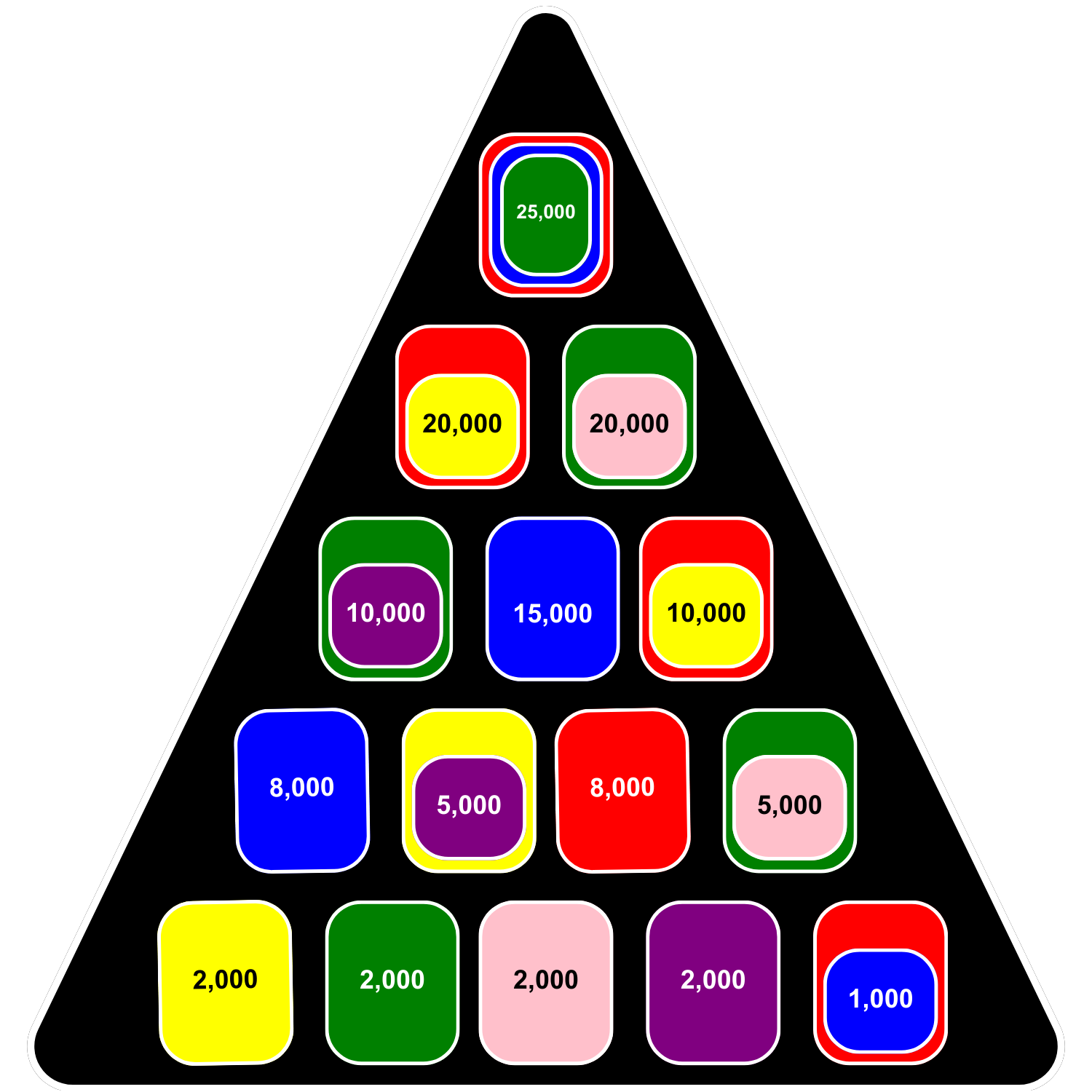
A re-creation of the pyramid board used on the show's first season.

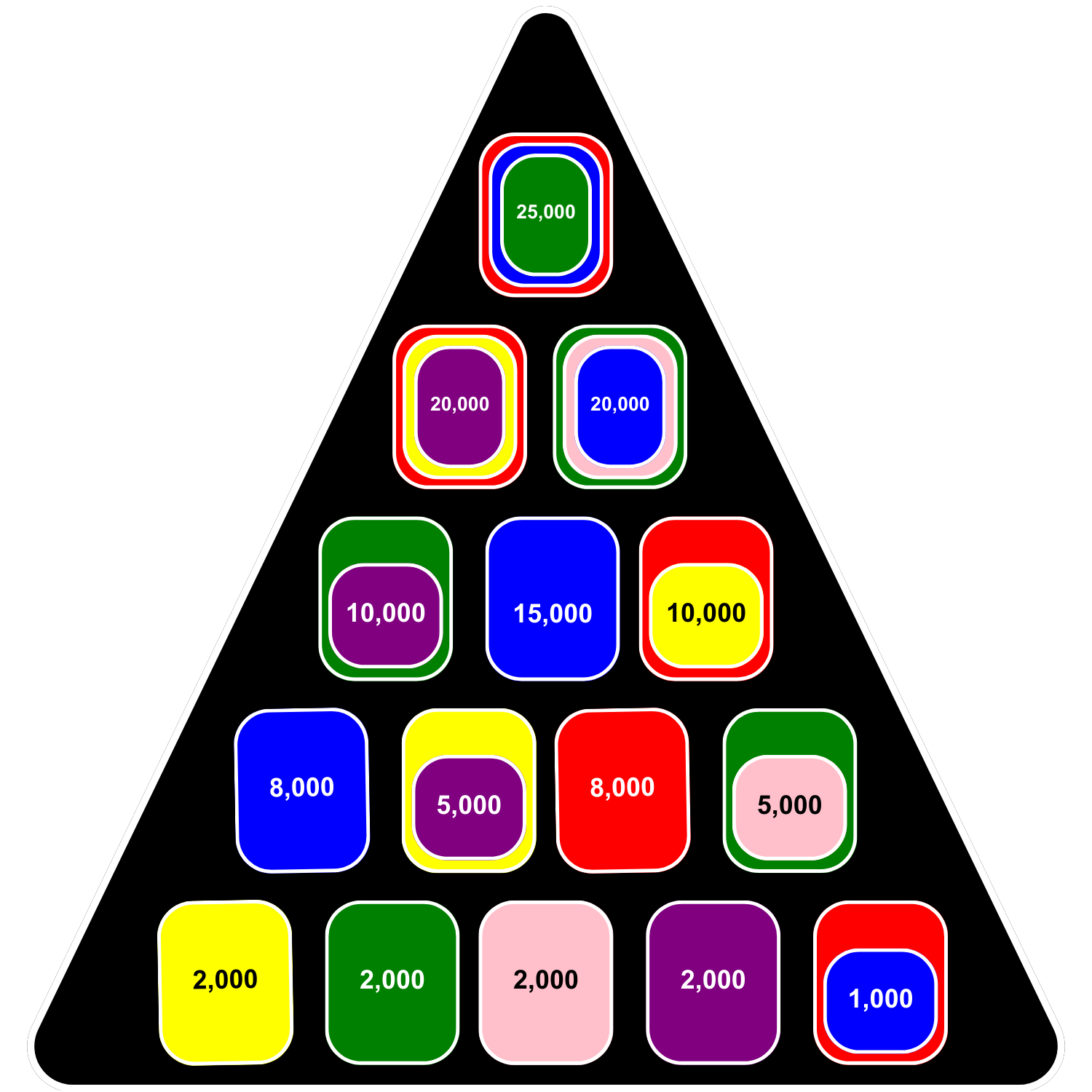
A re-creation of the pyramid board currently used on the show's second season; the fourth tier now has all six colors featured, with purple on the red and yellow tile and blue on the green and pink tile.

In each episode, five contestants, dubbed as rumblers, are positioned randomly in a flooring of the five-level triangular pyramid stage, which features 15 different cash amounts (ranging between ₱1,000 and ₱25,000) and varying colored spaces (of up to three different colors), with the lower amounts placing on the bottom to the top. Another board, "rally board", contains a set of 50 questions to choose from throughout the game, also with varying difficulties and types.

One question number from the board is selected, which presented a question and contestants must buzz-in first before providing an answer (if they already know the answer before the question is fully read). If they are correct, the contestant took control of a Die Rolling Machine (DRM), a centrifugal fan machine containing a six-sided die containing six different colors (of red, blue, green, yellow, purple and pink), and whatever the die rolls on will determine the space they will occupy and the money they banked (for example, if the contestant rolls a red color die, the contestant will land on the space containing the red color). If they are incorrect, or did not answer the question within three seconds, other contestants can buzz-in to take the question; however, if the second contestant also did not answer the question correctly, the question is discarded from play. The first question pick from the rally board is usually determined by the host Manzano itself, but subsequent picks are decided by the contestant who either answered the last question correctly or chose the previous question number.

One tile contains a "lucky tile", usually hidden among the tiles from the first two levels (and on occasions, tiles from the third level), which was presented to the viewers in advance prior to the start of each round, and to the contestants if the tile is unused at the end of the round. When stepped on by the contestant, various benefits will occur in different seasons: In season one, the lucky tile allows the contestant choose one space from the next row of the contestant's discretion; in season two, spaces of the same color matching the lucky tile that have been previously occupied by the contestant will double. Also in season two, some episodes features a variant lucky tile, Aginaldo (lit. 'rainbow gift'), allowing one contestant to win a prize if they choose one among the five spaces (these tiles are not revealed to the audience prior). Another advantage introduced in season two is Atras, which force one opponent to push back a space; Atras can be used at any time if desired during the first four levels.

If the roll results in a color that is not among the spaces from the next row, they will stay in that space and play resumes as normal (for example, if the contestant rolls a blue but no spaces contain the blue color, the contestant stays put). If that space has been occupied by another contestant, a "Tile Breaker" question is asked and the first contestant to identify the color assumes control of the space while the losing contestant will switch places, if the incumbent have been unseated. In season one, only one question may be challenged in any space except for those spaces with three colors (those of the top two levels), but this restriction is removed in season two.

The fifth and final level comprises only one space, which is always a three-colored space and is worth ₱25,000. Unlike other spaces, it cannot be directly landed on, as the contestant must also answer the question correctly, and either have land on, or roll the die, of any one the three colors, in order to land on it and win the game. Any winnings by the contestants are guaranteed based on the spaces they previously occupied at the end of the round, or with consolation prizes instead if the contestant did not win anything; the winner advances to Rainbow Revealed.

=== Rainbow Revealed ===
The contestant first faced a Rapid Rumble round for a chance at an advantage in the bonus round, by answering any three out of six questions correctly, non-consecutive. In the first season, a correct answer added two seconds to the timer, but the second season offers an advantage by choosing a free color of their choice. The Rapid Rumble round was absent on two episodes, being the first and the 31st episodes, both of season one.

After the Rapid Rumble was complete, six DRMs will be activated and the contestant is given 60 seconds to stop each of the DRMs. The objective is that the six dice must land on unique colors in no particular order, and one die must be stopped before they can move on to the next die. If any dice lands on the same color, they must return to that die and roll again if time permits. ₱5,000 is awarded to the contestant for every die of unique color they landed on, and if all six dice lands on six different unique colors, this is called "Rainbow Unlocked" and the contestant win the ₱1 million grand prize, and the title of "Rainbow Rumble Master".

The theoretical maximum amount they can win in this game is ₱1,070,000 in season one, and ₱1,078,000 in season two. (Note: The amount is theoretically possible if that they land on the Lucky Tile of the maximum amount that valued at ₱8,000 located on the red and blue tiles of the second level. In some rare cases, the blue tile of the third level valued at ₱15,000 was set as the lucky tile, which gives the theoretical maximum to ₱85,000.)

== Cast ==
=== Final hosts ===
The hosts of Rainbow Rumble

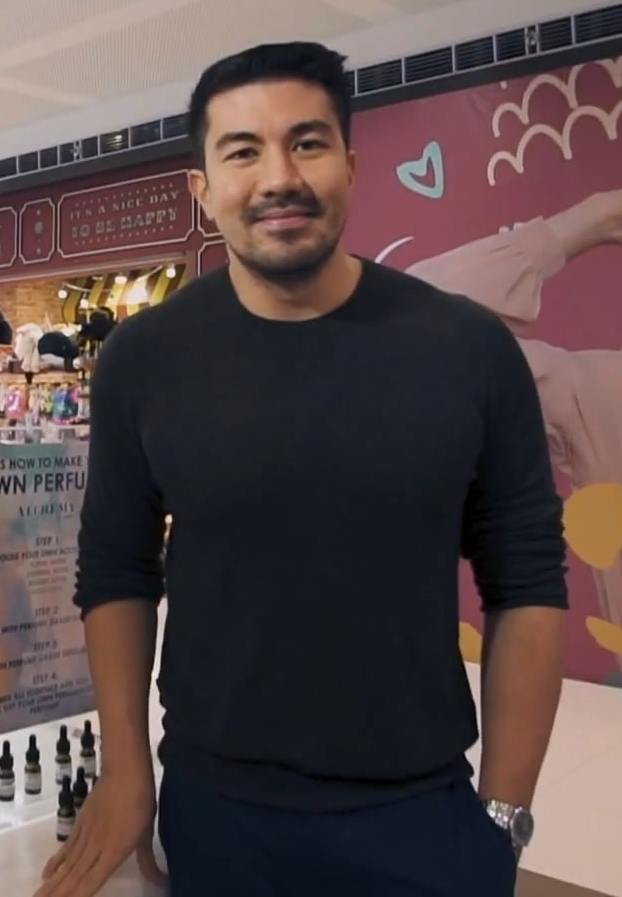
Luis Manzano

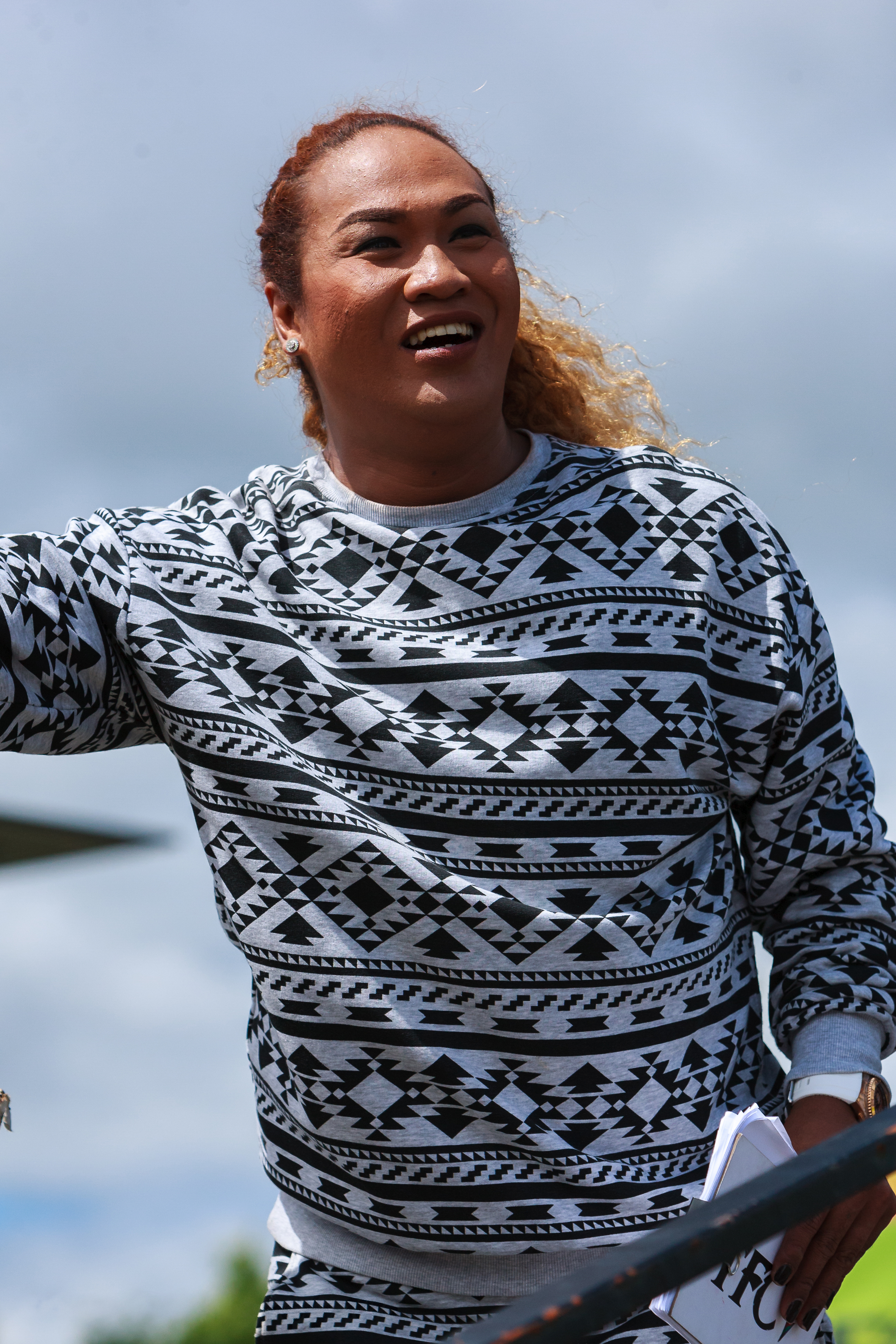
Negi

- Luis Manzano as main host; the "Rumble Master"
- Negi as co-host; the "Ka-Rambol"

==== Guest co-hosts ====
Guest co-hosts were introduced following Negi's absence in an episode.

- Long Mejia (June 28 and August 3, 2025 episodes)
- Divine Tetay (November 15, 29, December 28, 2025, and January 3, 2026 episodes)
- Iyah Mina (January 10 and 17, 2026 episodes)

=== Rainbow Pop Girls ===
The Rainbow Pop Girls are the show's models and backup dancers, representing the six colors of the die featured in the show: pink, yellow, red, blue, green, and purple. They assist Luis in the show and provide "luck" and "color" upon the contestants. Their true identities are unknown.

- Paris Pink
- Yumi Yellow
- Ruby Red
- Baby Blue
- Girlie Green
- Penny Purple

== Series overview ==
Season	Episodes	Originally released		No. of players	No. of jackpot winners
Season	Episodes	First released	Last released	No. of players	No. of jackpot winners
1	50	July 20, 2024	March 23, 2025	250	2
2	56	June 28, 2025	April 12, 2026	280 (Note: Includes 262 new players and 18 returning players as of the latest episode.)	2

== Development and production ==
The series was first teased on ABS-CBN's social media accounts in late June 2024, with a video asking the viewer a question in Filipino: "Ano ito na makulay, at kapag makarating ka sa dulo, may naghihintay na malaking papremyo?" (What is it that is colorful, and when you get to the end, there is a big prize waiting?). More information about the series was later announced at the beginning of July, when Luis Manzano renewed his contract with ABS-CBN on July 2, 2024. Furthermore, it was mentioned that the game resembles and pays homage to the pyramid format of Pilipinas, Game KNB?.

=== Broadcast ===
The first season aired on Kapamilya Channel, Kapamilya Online Live, A2Z and TV5 from July 20, 2024, to March 23, 2025, replacing the fifth season of I Can See Your Voice and was replaced by the seventh season of Pilipinas Got Talent. The second season aired from June 28, 2025 to April 12, 2026, taking over the timeslot held by Rated Korina and Tao Po!, with the season also simulcasting on All TV, thus marking the return of fresh ABS-CBN produced game show offerings to channels 2 and 16 in Mega Manila and regional channels previously used by the latter until 2020. This occurred just a year and 2 months after ABS-CBN Corporation and All TV's owner, Advanced Media Broadcasting System (AMBS), signed content agreements to air ABS-CBN programs on All TV.

The series is also available on-demand on iWant and internationally on TFC.

== List of "rainbow unlocked" winners ==
The list below displays four contestants, two from each season, who have won the ₱1 million grand prize.

List of Rainbow Rumble jackpot winners
No.	Date	Name	Colors rolled (Note: The colors listed below are in the order of their landing sequence in the DRM.)	Total jackpot prize	Ref.
Season 1
1	July 27, 2024	Raphael Bosano; ABS-CBN News Personalities 1	PU B G PI Y R	₱1,070,000	
2	August 24, 2024	Emilio Daez; Pamilya Sagrado Cast 1	B Y R PU G PI	₱1,062,000	
Season 2
3 (1)	July 19, 2025	Pinky Marquez; Titas	B PI G Y R PU	₱1,071,000	
4 (2)	August 30, 2025	Jenn Rosa; Sexy Streaming Stars	PI G Y B PU R	₱1,061,000	

== Contestants ==
As of April 12, 2026, Rainbow Rumble has featured a total of 530 players (or Rumblers, as used by the show) across 106 episodes—250 from the first season and 280 from the second season, with 18 making subsequent appearances.

Team names with alternate titles are listed below their official team names as used in the show; these alternates reflect the names they are commonly known by. For example, the "News Personalities" groups (s.1, ep. 3, s.2, ep. 8 & 41) may be referred to as "ABS-CBN News Personalities" since its members are from ABS-CBN, while the "Online Hosts" may also be called "Showtime Online Ü Hosts" (s.1, ep. 25) as they are affiliated with the noontime variety show It's Showtime. Moreover, during the first season of Rainbow Rumble on TV5, there was also a "Morning Show Hosts" group (s.1, ep. 34) composed of several hosts from Gud Morning Kapatid, which helped promote the program on both TV5 and RPTV. Notably, RPTV’s free-TV partner, RPN, utilizes multiple channel frequencies and broadcasting facilities, including Channel 9, which was previously operated by Rainbow Rumble producer ABS-CBN from 1958 to 1969.

In the case of groups with the same name (for example, two groups of casts from Pamilya Sagrado, Lavender Fields, and Sins of the Father; two groups of housemates from Pinoy Big Brother: Gen 11, two groups of Sexy Stars, three groups of casts from Goin' Bulilit, three groups of housemates from Pinoy Big Brother: Celebrity Collab Edition, six groups of casts from That's Entertainment; and two groups of members from Bini with Mickey Perz and Matthew Almodovar, News Personalities, and SexBomb Girls), the first group to play will be numbered one (1), followed by two (2), and so on (if there are any more groups from the same subject). (Note: With the exception of That's Entertainment Cast, see the list of season 2 players below for more details.)

Beginning with the second season, an italicized name indicates a returning player from previous episodes.

Rumblers that do not bank any money during the elimination round (signified with the value of ₱0) receive consolation prizes.

=== Season 1 ===
List of Rainbow Rumble season 1 contestants
Episode no.	Team name	Top contestant				Other contestants	Cash prize received
Episode no.	Team name	RTTT winner	Cash prize received	Additional cash prize	Total cash prize received	Other contestants	Cash prize received
1	Drama Moto Club	Sancho delas Alas	₱70,000	₱20,000	₱90,000	Gerald Anderson	₱10,000
1	Drama Moto Club	Sancho delas Alas	₱70,000	₱20,000	₱90,000	Jalal Laidan	₱0
1	Drama Moto Club	Sancho delas Alas	₱70,000	₱20,000	₱90,000	Marc Solis	₱0
1	Drama Moto Club	Sancho delas Alas	₱70,000	₱20,000	₱90,000	Sam Milby	₱20,000
2	Tondo Gang of FPJ's Batang Quiapo	Bassilyo	₱67,000	₱20,000	₱87,000	CrazyMix	₱5,000
2	Tondo Gang of FPJ's Batang Quiapo	Bassilyo	₱67,000	₱20,000	₱87,000	Flict-G	₱20,000
2	Tondo Gang of FPJ's Batang Quiapo	Bassilyo	₱67,000	₱20,000	₱87,000	Mastafeat	₱2,000
2	Tondo Gang of FPJ's Batang Quiapo	Bassilyo	₱67,000	₱20,000	₱87,000	Pistolero	₱15,000
3	News Personalities 1 (ABS-CBN News Personalities)	Raphael Bosano	₱70,000	**₱1,000,000**	₱1,070,000	Dennis Datu	₱0
3	News Personalities 1 (ABS-CBN News Personalities)	Raphael Bosano	₱70,000	**₱1,000,000**	₱1,070,000	Ganiel Krishnan	₱1,000
3	News Personalities 1 (ABS-CBN News Personalities)	Raphael Bosano	₱70,000	**₱1,000,000**	₱1,070,000	Migs Bustos	₱0
3	News Personalities 1 (ABS-CBN News Personalities)	Raphael Bosano	₱70,000	**₱1,000,000**	₱1,070,000	MJ Felipe	₱10,000
4	Team Payaman	Dudut	₱67,000	₱20,000	₱87,000	Bok	₱0
4	Team Payaman	Dudut	₱67,000	₱20,000	₱87,000	Krissy Achino	₱0
4	Team Payaman	Dudut	₱67,000	₱20,000	₱87,000	Steve	₱2,000
4	Team Payaman	Dudut	₱67,000	₱20,000	₱87,000	Yow	₱10,000
5	Viva Hot Babes	Andrea del Rosario	₱65,000	₱25,000	₱90,000	Gwen Garci	₱1,000
5	Viva Hot Babes	Andrea del Rosario	₱65,000	₱25,000	₱90,000	Jaycee Parker	₱15,000
5	Viva Hot Babes	Andrea del Rosario	₱65,000	₱25,000	₱90,000	Katya Santos	₱10,000
5	Viva Hot Babes	Andrea del Rosario	₱65,000	₱25,000	₱90,000	Maui Taylor	₱5,000
6	Goin' Bulilit Cast 1 (Goin' Bulilit Alumni)	Igi Boy Flores	₱65,000	₱25,000	₱90,000	Carl John Barrameda	₱2,000
6	Goin' Bulilit Cast 1 (Goin' Bulilit Alumni)	Igi Boy Flores	₱65,000	₱25,000	₱90,000	EJ Jallorina	₱10,000
6	Goin' Bulilit Cast 1 (Goin' Bulilit Alumni)	Igi Boy Flores	₱65,000	₱25,000	₱90,000	Nash Aguas	₱10,000
6	Goin' Bulilit Cast 1 (Goin' Bulilit Alumni)	Igi Boy Flores	₱65,000	₱25,000	₱90,000	Mika dela Cruz	₱2,000
7	Beks' Squad	Chad Kinis	₱65,000	₱25,000	₱90,000	Beki Velo	₱0
7	Beks' Squad	Chad Kinis	₱65,000	₱25,000	₱90,000	Divine Tetay	₱2,000
7	Beks' Squad	Chad Kinis	₱65,000	₱25,000	₱90,000	Petite	₱1,000
7	Beks' Squad	Chad Kinis	₱65,000	₱25,000	₱90,000	Tammy Brown	₱10,000
8	Can't Buy Me Love Cast	Karina Bautista	₱62,000	₱20,000	₱82,000	Alora Sasam	₱0
8	Can't Buy Me Love Cast	Karina Bautista	₱62,000	₱20,000	₱82,000	Gello Marquez	₱1,000
8	Can't Buy Me Love Cast	Karina Bautista	₱62,000	₱20,000	₱82,000	Joao Constancia	₱0
8	Can't Buy Me Love Cast	Karina Bautista	₱62,000	₱20,000	₱82,000	Vivoree	₱10,000
9	iWant ASAP Squadmates (Gen Z Squad)	Edward Barber	₱62,000	₱15,000	₱77,000	Jeremy Glinoga	₱2,000
9	iWant ASAP Squadmates (Gen Z Squad)	Edward Barber	₱62,000	₱15,000	₱77,000	Lorraine Galvez	₱10,000
9	iWant ASAP Squadmates (Gen Z Squad)	Edward Barber	₱62,000	₱15,000	₱77,000	Shanaia Gomez	₱2,000
9	iWant ASAP Squadmates (Gen Z Squad)	Edward Barber	₱62,000	₱15,000	₱77,000	Sheena Belarmino	₱10,000
10	Food Content Creators	Jujumao	₱62,000	₱15,000	₱77,000	Abi Marquez	₱8,000
10	Food Content Creators	Jujumao	₱62,000	₱15,000	₱77,000	Icoy	₱1,000
10	Food Content Creators	Jujumao	₱62,000	₱15,000	₱77,000	Kath	₱10,000
10	Food Content Creators	Jujumao	₱62,000	₱15,000	₱77,000	Ninong Ry	₱20,000
11	Pamilya Sagrado Cast 1	Emilio Daez	₱62,000	**₱1,000,000**	₱1,062,000	Daniela Stranner	₱0
11	Pamilya Sagrado Cast 1	Emilio Daez	₱62,000	**₱1,000,000**	₱1,062,000	Grae Fernandez	₱10,000
11	Pamilya Sagrado Cast 1	Emilio Daez	₱62,000	**₱1,000,000**	₱1,062,000	Jeremiah Lisbo	₱20,000
11	Pamilya Sagrado Cast 1	Emilio Daez	₱62,000	**₱1,000,000**	₱1,062,000	Kyle Echarri	₱8,000
12	LGBTQIA+ Pageant Kweens (Miss Q and A Alumni)	Anne Patricia Lorenzo	₱62,000	₱20,000	₱82,000	Matmat Centino	₱15,000
12	LGBTQIA+ Pageant Kweens (Miss Q and A Alumni)	Anne Patricia Lorenzo	₱62,000	₱20,000	₱82,000	Mitch Montecarlo Suansane	₱2,000
12	LGBTQIA+ Pageant Kweens (Miss Q and A Alumni)	Anne Patricia Lorenzo	₱62,000	₱20,000	₱82,000	Ralph Conducto Romero	₱0
12	LGBTQIA+ Pageant Kweens (Miss Q and A Alumni)	Anne Patricia Lorenzo	₱62,000	₱20,000	₱82,000	Sashi Giggle Esmeralda	₱5,000
13	Pinoy Big Brother: Kumunity Season 10 Housemates (Celebrity Housemates)	Eian Rances	₱62,000	₱25,000	₱87,000	Anji Salvacion	₱0
13	Pinoy Big Brother: Kumunity Season 10 Housemates (Celebrity Housemates)	Eian Rances	₱62,000	₱25,000	₱87,000	Benedix Ramos	₱20,000
13	Pinoy Big Brother: Kumunity Season 10 Housemates (Celebrity Housemates)	Eian Rances	₱62,000	₱25,000	₱87,000	Jordan Andrews	₱15,000
13	Pinoy Big Brother: Kumunity Season 10 Housemates (Celebrity Housemates)	Eian Rances	₱62,000	₱25,000	₱87,000	Samantha Bernardo	₱2,000
14	High Street Gen Z Cast	Ralph de Leon	₱62,000	₱20,000	₱82,000	AC Bonifacio	₱0
14	High Street Gen Z Cast	Ralph de Leon	₱62,000	₱20,000	₱82,000	Gela Atayde	₱10,000
14	High Street Gen Z Cast	Ralph de Leon	₱62,000	₱20,000	₱82,000	Harvey Bautista	₱2,000
14	High Street Gen Z Cast	Ralph de Leon	₱62,000	₱20,000	₱82,000	Tommy Alejandrino	₱1,000
15	ASAP Sessionistas	Nyoy Volante	₱66,000	₱25,000	₱91,000	Ice Seguerra	₱0
15	ASAP Sessionistas	Nyoy Volante	₱66,000	₱25,000	₱91,000	Kean Cipriano	₱1,000
15	ASAP Sessionistas	Nyoy Volante	₱66,000	₱25,000	₱91,000	Princess Velasco	₱20,000
15	ASAP Sessionistas	Nyoy Volante	₱66,000	₱25,000	₱91,000	Sitti	₱2,000
16	Musical Theater Actors	Jenine Desiderio	₱62,000	₱25,000	₱87,000	Bituin Escalante	₱8,000
16	Musical Theater Actors	Jenine Desiderio	₱62,000	₱25,000	₱87,000	Franco Laurel	₱15,000
16	Musical Theater Actors	Jenine Desiderio	₱62,000	₱25,000	₱87,000	Isay Alvarez	₱20,000
16	Musical Theater Actors	Jenine Desiderio	₱62,000	₱25,000	₱87,000	Jamie Rivera	₱8,000
17	SexBomb Girls 1	Monic Icban-Diamante	₱67,000	₱20,000	₱87,000	Izzy Tragona-Aragon	₱2,000
17	SexBomb Girls 1	Monic Icban-Diamante	₱67,000	₱20,000	₱87,000	Mae Acosta-Valdes	₱10,000
17	SexBomb Girls 1	Monic Icban-Diamante	₱67,000	₱20,000	₱87,000	Mia Pangyarihan	₱8,000
17	SexBomb Girls 1	Monic Icban-Diamante	₱67,000	₱20,000	₱87,000	Mhyca Bautista	₱0
18	Pamilya ni Kuya (Pinoy Big Brother Hosts)	Enchong Dee	₱65,000	₱20,000	₱85,000	Bianca Gonzalez	₱8,000
18	Pamilya ni Kuya (Pinoy Big Brother Hosts)	Enchong Dee	₱65,000	₱20,000	₱85,000	Kim Chiu	₱1,000
18	Pamilya ni Kuya (Pinoy Big Brother Hosts)	Enchong Dee	₱65,000	₱20,000	₱85,000	Melai Cantiveros	₱20,000
18	Pamilya ni Kuya (Pinoy Big Brother Hosts)	Enchong Dee	₱65,000	₱20,000	₱85,000	Robi Domingo	₱10,000
19	OPM Icons	Ogie Alcasid	₱62,000	₱20,000	₱82,000	Erik Santos	₱1,000
19	OPM Icons	Ogie Alcasid	₱62,000	₱20,000	₱82,000	Gary Valenciano	₱2,000
19	OPM Icons	Ogie Alcasid	₱62,000	₱20,000	₱82,000	Louie Ocampo	₱0
19	OPM Icons	Ogie Alcasid	₱62,000	₱20,000	₱82,000	Martin Nievera	₱0
20	Pamilya Sagrado Cast 2	Nikki Valdez	₱62,000	₱25,000	₱87,000	Apey Obera	₱0
20	Pamilya Sagrado Cast 2	Nikki Valdez	₱62,000	₱25,000	₱87,000	John Joven Uy	₱8,000
20	Pamilya Sagrado Cast 2	Nikki Valdez	₱62,000	₱25,000	₱87,000	Joko Diaz	₱5,000
20	Pamilya Sagrado Cast 2	Nikki Valdez	₱62,000	₱25,000	₱87,000	Rosanna Roces	₱10,000
21	BGYO	Akira Morishita	₱62,000	₱20,000	₱82,000	Gelo Rivera	₱10,000
21	BGYO	Akira Morishita	₱62,000	₱20,000	₱82,000	JL Toreliza	₱10,000
21	BGYO	Akira Morishita	₱62,000	₱20,000	₱82,000	Mikki Claver	₱15,000
21	BGYO	Akira Morishita	₱62,000	₱20,000	₱82,000	Nate Porcalla	₱20,000
22	PBA Moto Club	Ryan Araña	₱65,000	₱15,000	₱80,000	Cyrus Baguio	₱20,000
22	PBA Moto Club	Ryan Araña	₱65,000	₱15,000	₱80,000	Jerwin Gaco	₱5,000
22	PBA Moto Club	Ryan Araña	₱65,000	₱15,000	₱80,000	KG Canaleta	₱10,000
22	PBA Moto Club	Ryan Araña	₱65,000	₱15,000	₱80,000	Rico Maierhofer	₱15,000
23	Pinoy Big Brother OGs (Pinoy Big Brother: Season 1 Housemates)	Chx Alcala	₱61,000	₱20,000	₱81,000	Nene Tamayo	₱5,000
23	Pinoy Big Brother OGs (Pinoy Big Brother: Season 1 Housemates)	Chx Alcala	₱61,000	₱20,000	₱81,000	Racquel Reyes	₱8,000
23	Pinoy Big Brother OGs (Pinoy Big Brother: Season 1 Housemates)	Chx Alcala	₱61,000	₱20,000	₱81,000	Rico Barrera	₱2,000
23	Pinoy Big Brother OGs (Pinoy Big Brother: Season 1 Housemates)	Chx Alcala	₱61,000	₱20,000	₱81,000	Say Alonzo	₱20,000
24	Stand-Up Comedians	Tart Carlos	₱69,000	₱20,000	₱89,000	Ayee Aplacador	₱2,000
24	Stand-Up Comedians	Tart Carlos	₱69,000	₱20,000	₱89,000	Iyah Mina	₱20,000
24	Stand-Up Comedians	Tart Carlos	₱69,000	₱20,000	₱89,000	Pepay Aguilar	₱5,000
24	Stand-Up Comedians	Tart Carlos	₱69,000	₱20,000	₱89,000	Tonton Soriano	₱10,000
25	Online Hosts (Showtime Online Ü Hosts)	AC Soriano	₱62,000	₱20,000	₱82,000	Anthony Castillo	₱10,000
25	Online Hosts (Showtime Online Ü Hosts)	AC Soriano	₱62,000	₱20,000	₱82,000	Eris Aragoza	₱15,000
25	Online Hosts (Showtime Online Ü Hosts)	AC Soriano	₱62,000	₱20,000	₱82,000	Nicki Morena	₱20,000
25	Online Hosts (Showtime Online Ü Hosts)	AC Soriano	₱62,000	₱20,000	₱82,000	Wize Estabillo	₱5,000
26	Ang TV Stars	Jan Marini Alano	₱62,000	₱20,000	₱82,000	Christopher Roxas	₱2,000
26	Ang TV Stars	Jan Marini Alano	₱62,000	₱20,000	₱82,000	Gio Alvarez	₱10,000
26	Ang TV Stars	Jan Marini Alano	₱62,000	₱20,000	₱82,000	Guila Alvarez	₱2,000
26	Ang TV Stars	Jan Marini Alano	₱62,000	₱20,000	₱82,000	Jane Zaleta	₱0
27	Maharlika Pilipinas Basketball League Players	Jonathan Grey	₱62,000	₱25,000	₱87,000	Carlo Lastimosa	₱2,000
27	Maharlika Pilipinas Basketball League Players	Jonathan Grey	₱62,000	₱25,000	₱87,000	Jojo Cunanan	₱2,000
27	Maharlika Pilipinas Basketball League Players	Jonathan Grey	₱62,000	₱25,000	₱87,000	Marc Pingris	₱15,000
27	Maharlika Pilipinas Basketball League Players	Jonathan Grey	₱62,000	₱25,000	₱87,000	Ronnie Alonte	₱10,000
28	The KoolPals	James Caraan	₱61,000	₱20,000	₱81,000	GB Labrador	₱5,000
28	The KoolPals	James Caraan	₱61,000	₱20,000	₱81,000	Muman Reyes	₱10,000
28	The KoolPals	James Caraan	₱61,000	₱20,000	₱81,000	Nonong Ballinan	₱20,000
28	The KoolPals	James Caraan	₱61,000	₱20,000	₱81,000	Ryan Rems	₱10,000
29	Lavender Fields Cast 1	Janine Gutierrez	₱62,000	₱20,000	₱82,000	Bernard Palanca	₱1,000
29	Lavender Fields Cast 1	Janine Gutierrez	₱62,000	₱20,000	₱82,000	Cheena Crab	₱2,000
29	Lavender Fields Cast 1	Janine Gutierrez	₱62,000	₱20,000	₱82,000	Eric Nicolas	₱5,000
29	Lavender Fields Cast 1	Janine Gutierrez	₱62,000	₱20,000	₱82,000	Jericho Rosales	₱8,000
30	Streetboys	Meynard Marcellano	₱62,000	₱20,000	₱82,000	Christopher Cruz	₱10,000
30	Streetboys	Meynard Marcellano	₱62,000	₱20,000	₱82,000	Danilo Barrios	₱2,000
30	Streetboys	Meynard Marcellano	₱62,000	₱20,000	₱82,000	Joey Andres	₱8,000
30	Streetboys	Meynard Marcellano	₱62,000	₱20,000	₱82,000	Vhong Navarro	₱20,000
31	Funny Personalities (Funny Entertainers and Personalities)	Xilhouete	₱62,000	₱20,000	₱82,000	Ethel Booba	₱0
31	Funny Personalities (Funny Entertainers and Personalities)	Xilhouete	₱62,000	₱20,000	₱82,000	Kim Molina	₱1,000
31	Funny Personalities (Funny Entertainers and Personalities)	Xilhouete	₱62,000	₱20,000	₱82,000	Pooh	₱0
31	Funny Personalities (Funny Entertainers and Personalities)	Xilhouete	₱62,000	₱20,000	₱82,000	Yobab	₱0
32	The Huddle Room	Leslie Sadili	₱62,000	₱20,000	₱82,000	Amita Jimenez	₱10,000
32	The Huddle Room	Leslie Sadili	₱62,000	₱20,000	₱82,000	Jennie Rogel	₱5,000
32	The Huddle Room	Leslie Sadili	₱62,000	₱20,000	₱82,000	Juan Divinagracia	₱10,000
32	The Huddle Room	Leslie Sadili	₱62,000	₱20,000	₱82,000	Mary Fernandez	₱20,000
33	I Can See Your Voice SINGvestigators	Angeline Quinto	₱65,000	₱15,000	₱80,000	Lassy Marquez	₱10,000
33	I Can See Your Voice SINGvestigators	Angeline Quinto	₱65,000	₱15,000	₱80,000	Long Mejia	₱5,000
33	I Can See Your Voice SINGvestigators	Angeline Quinto	₱65,000	₱15,000	₱80,000	Lucas Garcia	₱20,000
33	I Can See Your Voice SINGvestigators	Angeline Quinto	₱65,000	₱15,000	₱80,000	MC Muah Calaquian	₱15,000
34	Gud Morning Kapatid Hosts (Morning Show Hosts)	Dimples Romana	₱65,000	₱25,000	₱90,000	Chiqui Roa-Puno	₱20,000
34	Gud Morning Kapatid Hosts (Morning Show Hosts)	Dimples Romana	₱65,000	₱25,000	₱90,000	Jes Delos Santos	₱8,000
34	Gud Morning Kapatid Hosts (Morning Show Hosts)	Dimples Romana	₱65,000	₱25,000	₱90,000	Justin Quirino	₱8,000
34	Gud Morning Kapatid Hosts (Morning Show Hosts)	Dimples Romana	₱65,000	₱25,000	₱90,000	Maoui David	₱10,000
35	Hello, Love, Again Cast	Alden Richards	₱65,000	₱10,000	₱75,000	Joross Gamboa	₱5,000
35	Hello, Love, Again Cast	Alden Richards	₱65,000	₱10,000	₱75,000	Kakai Bautista	₱0
35	Hello, Love, Again Cast	Alden Richards	₱65,000	₱10,000	₱75,000	Lovely Abella-Manalo	₱5,000
35	Hello, Love, Again Cast	Alden Richards	₱65,000	₱10,000	₱75,000	Valerie Concepcion	₱8,000
36	Starcom	Anna Isleta	₱65,000	₱25,000	₱90,000	Ange Panem	₱10,000
36	Starcom	Anna Isleta	₱65,000	₱25,000	₱90,000	Luke Vicente	₱2,000
36	Starcom	Anna Isleta	₱65,000	₱25,000	₱90,000	Riezl Monteposo	₱8,000
36	Starcom	Anna Isleta	₱65,000	₱25,000	₱90,000	Shao Sandil	₱2,000
37	OMG United Media Lab	Winrich Sagle	₱65,000	₱25,000	₱90,000	Jason Garcia	₱5,000
37	OMG United Media Lab	Winrich Sagle	₱65,000	₱25,000	₱90,000	Jehanne Quejada	₱8,000
37	OMG United Media Lab	Winrich Sagle	₱65,000	₱25,000	₱90,000	Joro Arada	₱5,000
37	OMG United Media Lab	Winrich Sagle	₱65,000	₱25,000	₱90,000	Kyle Baltazar	₱20,000
38	Saving Grace Cast	Eric Fructuoso	₱67,000	₱20,000	₱87,000	Adrian Lindayag	₱5,000
38	Saving Grace Cast	Eric Fructuoso	₱67,000	₱20,000	₱87,000	Elisse Joson	₱8,000
38	Saving Grace Cast	Eric Fructuoso	₱67,000	₱20,000	₱87,000	Janice de Belen	₱2,000
38	Saving Grace Cast	Eric Fructuoso	₱67,000	₱20,000	₱87,000	Julia Montes	₱10,000
39	Pinoy Big Brother: Gen 11 Housemates 1	Patrick Ramirez	₱61,000	₱20,000	₱81,000	Fyang Smith	₱8,000
39	Pinoy Big Brother: Gen 11 Housemates 1	Patrick Ramirez	₱61,000	₱20,000	₱81,000	Jas Dudley-Scales	₱10,000
39	Pinoy Big Brother: Gen 11 Housemates 1	Patrick Ramirez	₱61,000	₱20,000	₱81,000	JM Ibarra	₱10,000
39	Pinoy Big Brother: Gen 11 Housemates 1	Patrick Ramirez	₱61,000	₱20,000	₱81,000	Therese Villamor	₱2,000
40	Former Star Circle Quest Teen Questors	Hero Angeles	₱64,000	₱20,000	₱84,000	Errol Abalayan	₱10,000
40	Former Star Circle Quest Teen Questors	Hero Angeles	₱64,000	₱20,000	₱84,000	Joseph Bitangcol	₱5,000
40	Former Star Circle Quest Teen Questors	Hero Angeles	₱64,000	₱20,000	₱84,000	Melissa Ricks	₱20,000
40	Former Star Circle Quest Teen Questors	Hero Angeles	₱64,000	₱20,000	₱84,000	Roxanne Guinoo	₱2,000
41	Lavender Fields Cast 2	Thou Reyes	₱62,000	₱20,000	₱82,000	Biboy Ramirez	₱15,000
41	Lavender Fields Cast 2	Thou Reyes	₱62,000	₱20,000	₱82,000	Jodi Sta. Maria	₱8,000
41	Lavender Fields Cast 2	Thou Reyes	₱62,000	₱20,000	₱82,000	Maricel Soriano	₱5,000
41	Lavender Fields Cast 2	Thou Reyes	₱62,000	₱20,000	₱82,000	Pamu Pamorada	₱2,000
42	Star Moms	Carlene Aguilar	₱62,000	₱20,000	₱82,000	Ara Mina	₱2,000
42	Star Moms	Carlene Aguilar	₱62,000	₱20,000	₱82,000	Jeck Maierhofer	₱10,000
42	Star Moms	Carlene Aguilar	₱62,000	₱20,000	₱82,000	Maricel Morales	₱20,000
42	Star Moms	Carlene Aguilar	₱62,000	₱20,000	₱82,000	Rochelle Barrameda	₱0
43	Talent Reality Show Champions	Jason Dy	₱61,000	₱20,000	₱81,000	JM Yosures	₱10,000
43	Talent Reality Show Champions	Jason Dy	₱61,000	₱20,000	₱81,000	Jona Viray	₱20,000
43	Talent Reality Show Champions	Jason Dy	₱61,000	₱20,000	₱81,000	Khimo Gumatay	₱8,000
43	Talent Reality Show Champions	Jason Dy	₱61,000	₱20,000	₱81,000	Lyka Estrella	₱0
44	Singer Comedians	Tuesday Vargas	₱69,000	₱20,000	₱94,000	Anton Diva	₱0
44	Singer Comedians	Tuesday Vargas	₱69,000	₱20,000	₱94,000	Ate Gay	₱20,000
44	Singer Comedians	Tuesday Vargas	₱69,000	₱20,000	₱94,000	Jewel Johnson	₱5,000
44	Singer Comedians	Tuesday Vargas	₱69,000	₱20,000	₱94,000	Makki Lucino	₱5,000
45	Bini 1	Mikha Lim	₱62,000	₱25,000	₱87,000	Colet Vergara	₱5,000
45	Bini 1	Mikha Lim	₱62,000	₱25,000	₱87,000	Jhoanna Robles	₱15,000
45	Bini 1	Mikha Lim	₱62,000	₱25,000	₱87,000	Mickey Perz	₱5,000
45	Bini 1	Mikha Lim	₱62,000	₱25,000	₱87,000	Sheena Catacutan	₱10,000
46	Bini 2	Aiah Arceta	₱62,000	₱20,000	₱82,000	Gwen Apuli	₱2,000
46	Bini 2	Aiah Arceta	₱62,000	₱20,000	₱82,000	Maloi Ricalde	₱10,000
46	Bini 2	Aiah Arceta	₱62,000	₱20,000	₱82,000	Matthew Almodovar	₱5,000
46	Bini 2	Aiah Arceta	₱62,000	₱20,000	₱82,000	Stacey Sevilleja	₱8,000
47	Drag Queens (from Drag Race Philippines season 1)	Brigiding	₱62,000	₱25,000	₱87,000	Lady Morgana	₱10,000
47	Drag Queens (from Drag Race Philippines season 1)	Brigiding	₱62,000	₱25,000	₱87,000	Minty Fresh	₱15,000
47	Drag Queens (from Drag Race Philippines season 1)	Brigiding	₱62,000	₱25,000	₱87,000	Precious Paula Nicole	₱5,000
47	Drag Queens (from Drag Race Philippines season 1)	Brigiding	₱62,000	₱25,000	₱87,000	Viñas DeLuxe	₱20,000
48	FM Radio DJs	Jhai Ho	₱61,000	₱20,000	₱81,000	Eva Ronda	₱5,000
48	FM Radio DJs	Jhai Ho	₱61,000	₱20,000	₱81,000	Gandang Kara	₱2,000
48	FM Radio DJs	Jhai Ho	₱61,000	₱20,000	₱81,000	Joco Loco	₱0
48	FM Radio DJs	Jhai Ho	₱61,000	₱20,000	₱81,000	Papa Jackson	₱10,000
49	Star Magic Freshies	Krystal Mejes	₱65,000	₱20,000	₱85,000	Chunsa Jung	₱20,000
49	Star Magic Freshies	Krystal Mejes	₱65,000	₱20,000	₱85,000	Jana Agoncillo	₱0
49	Star Magic Freshies	Krystal Mejes	₱65,000	₱20,000	₱85,000	Marc Santiago	₱2,000
49	Star Magic Freshies	Krystal Mejes	₱65,000	₱20,000	₱85,000	Miguel Vergara	₱1,000
50	Pinoy Big Brother: Gen 11 Housemates 2	Kolette Madelo	₱69,000	₱25,000	₱94,000	Binsoy Namoca	₱2,000
50	Pinoy Big Brother: Gen 11 Housemates 2	Kolette Madelo	₱69,000	₱25,000	₱94,000	Dylan Yturralde	₱10,000
50	Pinoy Big Brother: Gen 11 Housemates 2	Kolette Madelo	₱69,000	₱25,000	₱94,000	JP Cabrera	₱5,000
50	Pinoy Big Brother: Gen 11 Housemates 2	Kolette Madelo	₱69,000	₱25,000	₱94,000	Kai Montinola	₱20,000
Total			₱3,191,000	₱3,005,000	₱6,196,000		₱1,511,000
Grand Total			₱7,707,000				

=== Season 2 ===
Some clarifications regarding team names:

- That's Entertainment Cast (six batches): The first two groups consisted exclusively of female and male members, officially designated as Iconic Ladies and Boys, respectively. The next two groups featured mixed-gender members collectively identified by the show as That’s Entertainment Cast. The fifth group, although composed entirely of male members, was also referred to under the same collective title. The sixth group, composed entirely of female members, likewise carried the That’s Entertainment Cast designation and included one returnee from the Iconic Ladies episode, Sharmaine Arnaiz. For consistency and to avoid ambiguity, the unified reference for this subject shall be That’s Entertainment Cast, applied in documentation below their official team names, reflecting the title used by the show when referring to the ensemble.
- Child Stars (two batches): Both groups carry the collective title Child Stars, with distinguishing subtitles used for clarification: Gen Z Child Stars and Original Child Stars. The former comprises child actors from the Gen Z era, while the latter includes child actors active primarily during the 1980s to 1990s.

List of Rainbow Rumble season 2 contestants
Episode no.	Team name	Top contestant				Other contestants	Cash prize received
Episode no.	Team name	RTTT winner	Cash prize received	Additional cash prize	Total cash prize received	Other contestants	Cash prize received
1	LGBTQIA+ Achievers	Marina Summers	₱65,000	₱20,000	₱85,000	Iyah Mina	₱0
1	LGBTQIA+ Achievers	Marina Summers	₱65,000	₱20,000	₱85,000	Jervi Wrightson	₱20,000
1	LGBTQIA+ Achievers	Marina Summers	₱65,000	₱20,000	₱85,000	Sassa Gurl	₱15,000
1	LGBTQIA+ Achievers	Marina Summers	₱65,000	₱20,000	₱85,000	Vice Ganda	₱10,000
2	Sins of the Father Cast 1	JC de Vera	₱75,000	₱25,000	₱100,000	Gerald Anderson	₱8,000
2	Sins of the Father Cast 1	JC de Vera	₱75,000	₱25,000	₱100,000	Jerald Napoles	₱5,000
2	Sins of the Father Cast 1	JC de Vera	₱75,000	₱25,000	₱100,000	Jessy Mendiola	₱2,000
2	Sins of the Father Cast 1	JC de Vera	₱75,000	₱25,000	₱100,000	RK Bagatsing	₱20,000
3	Sins of the Father Cast 2	Francine Diaz	₱67,000	₱20,000	₱87,000	Alex Medina	₱8,000
3	Sins of the Father Cast 2	Francine Diaz	₱67,000	₱20,000	₱87,000	Elyson de Dios	₱8,000
3	Sins of the Father Cast 2	Francine Diaz	₱67,000	₱20,000	₱87,000	Jeremiah Lisbo	₱2,000
3	Sins of the Father Cast 2	Francine Diaz	₱67,000	₱20,000	₱87,000	Seth Fedelin	₱8,000
4	Cup of Joe	Xen Gareza	₱70,000	₱20,000	₱90,000	CJ Fernandez	₱10,000
4	Cup of Joe	Xen Gareza	₱70,000	₱20,000	₱90,000	Gabriel Fernandez	₱0
4	Cup of Joe	Xen Gareza	₱70,000	₱20,000	₱90,000	Gian Bernardino	₱15,000
4	Cup of Joe	Xen Gareza	₱70,000	₱20,000	₱90,000	Raphaell Ridao	₱12,000
5	It's Showtime Family	Jhong Hilario	₱67,000	₱20,000	₱87,000	Cianne Dominguez	₱5,000
5	It's Showtime Family	Jhong Hilario	₱67,000	₱20,000	₱87,000	Dumbo	₱26,000
5	It's Showtime Family	Jhong Hilario	₱67,000	₱20,000	₱87,000	Jackie Gonzaga	₱2,000
5	It's Showtime Family	Jhong Hilario	₱67,000	₱20,000	₱87,000	Neri Lopera	₱2,000
6	Sunshine Cast	Maris Racal	₱67,000	₱25,000	₱92,000	Antoinette Jadaone	₱20,000
6	Sunshine Cast	Maris Racal	₱67,000	₱25,000	₱92,000	Dan Villegas	₱2,000
6	Sunshine Cast	Maris Racal	₱67,000	₱25,000	₱92,000	Elijah Canlas	₱10,000
6	Sunshine Cast	Maris Racal	₱67,000	₱25,000	₱92,000	Meryll Soriano	₱10,000
7	Titas (OPM Icon Titas)	Pinky Marquez	₱71,000	**₱1,000,000**	₱1,071,000	Celeste Legaspi	₱2,000
7	Titas (OPM Icon Titas)	Pinky Marquez	₱71,000	**₱1,000,000**	₱1,071,000	Leah Navarro	₱0
7	Titas (OPM Icon Titas)	Pinky Marquez	₱71,000	**₱1,000,000**	₱1,071,000	Mitch Valdes	₱5,000
7	Titas (OPM Icon Titas)	Pinky Marquez	₱71,000	**₱1,000,000**	₱1,071,000	Nanette Inventor	₱5,000
8	News Personalities 2 (ABS-CBN News Personalities)	Adrian Ayalin	₱65,000	₱20,000	₱85,000	Anjo Bagaoisan	₱19,000
8	News Personalities 2 (ABS-CBN News Personalities)	Adrian Ayalin	₱65,000	₱20,000	₱85,000	Ariel Rojas	₱10,000
8	News Personalities 2 (ABS-CBN News Personalities)	Adrian Ayalin	₱65,000	₱20,000	₱85,000	Denice Dinsay	₱10,000
8	News Personalities 2 (ABS-CBN News Personalities)	Adrian Ayalin	₱65,000	₱20,000	₱85,000	Lyza Aquino	₱8,000
9	FPJ's Batang Quiapo Cast (Batang Quiapo Boys)	Jay Gonzaga	₱72,000	₱25,000	₱97,000	Baby Giant	₱0
9	FPJ's Batang Quiapo Cast (Batang Quiapo Boys)	Jay Gonzaga	₱72,000	₱25,000	₱97,000	Big Mak	₱2,000
9	FPJ's Batang Quiapo Cast (Batang Quiapo Boys)	Jay Gonzaga	₱72,000	₱25,000	₱97,000	Mammoth	₱10,000
9	FPJ's Batang Quiapo Cast (Batang Quiapo Boys)	Jay Gonzaga	₱72,000	₱25,000	₱97,000	Ryan Martin	₱20,000
10	Pinoy Big Brother: Celebrity Collab Edition Housemates 1 (PBB Collab Kapuso Housemates)	Mika Salamanca	₱61,000	₱25,000	₱86,000	AZ Martinez	₱5,000
10	Pinoy Big Brother: Celebrity Collab Edition Housemates 1 (PBB Collab Kapuso Housemates)	Mika Salamanca	₱61,000	₱25,000	₱86,000	Charlie Fleming	₱2,000
10	Pinoy Big Brother: Celebrity Collab Edition Housemates 1 (PBB Collab Kapuso Housemates)	Mika Salamanca	₱61,000	₱25,000	₱86,000	Dustin Yu	₱10,000
10	Pinoy Big Brother: Celebrity Collab Edition Housemates 1 (PBB Collab Kapuso Housemates)	Mika Salamanca	₱61,000	₱25,000	₱86,000	Michael Sager	₱20,000
11	SexBomb Girls 2	Sunshine Garcia	₱65,000	₱25,000	₱90,000	Aifha Medina	₱20,000
11	SexBomb Girls 2	Sunshine Garcia	₱65,000	₱25,000	₱90,000	Jackie Rivas	₱14,000
11	SexBomb Girls 2	Sunshine Garcia	₱65,000	₱25,000	₱90,000	Joy Cancio	₱5,000
11	SexBomb Girls 2	Sunshine Garcia	₱65,000	₱25,000	₱90,000	Sugar Mercado	₱10,000
12	Love at First Spike Cast	Sky Quizon	₱65,000	₱25,000	₱90,000	Bong Gonzales	₱10,000
12	Love at First Spike Cast	Sky Quizon	₱65,000	₱25,000	₱90,000	Rain Celmar	₱2,000
12	Love at First Spike Cast	Sky Quizon	₱65,000	₱25,000	₱90,000	Reign Parani	₱8,000
12	Love at First Spike Cast	Sky Quizon	₱65,000	₱25,000	₱90,000	Sean Tristan	₱22,000
13	Pinoy Big Brother: Celebrity Collab Edition Housemates 2	Klarisse de Guzman	₱65,000	₱25,000	₱90,000	Ashley Ortega	₱8,000
13	Pinoy Big Brother: Celebrity Collab Edition Housemates 2	Klarisse de Guzman	₱65,000	₱25,000	₱90,000	Josh Ford	₱0
13	Pinoy Big Brother: Celebrity Collab Edition Housemates 2	Klarisse de Guzman	₱65,000	₱25,000	₱90,000	Kira Balinger	₱1,000
13	Pinoy Big Brother: Celebrity Collab Edition Housemates 2	Klarisse de Guzman	₱65,000	₱25,000	₱90,000	Xyriel Manabat	₱15,000
14	That's Entertainment Iconic Ladies (That's Entertainment Cast Batch 1)	Nadia Montenegro	₱62,000	₱25,000	₱87,000	Gladys Reyes	₱15,000
14	That's Entertainment Iconic Ladies (That's Entertainment Cast Batch 1)	Nadia Montenegro	₱62,000	₱25,000	₱87,000	Harlene Bautista	₱20,000
14	That's Entertainment Iconic Ladies (That's Entertainment Cast Batch 1)	Nadia Montenegro	₱62,000	₱25,000	₱87,000	Karla Estrada	₱1,000
14	That's Entertainment Iconic Ladies (That's Entertainment Cast Batch 1)	Nadia Montenegro	₱62,000	₱25,000	₱87,000	Sharmaine Arnaiz	₱5,000
15	GMA Supershow Hosts (Supershow Hosts)	Richard Reynoso	₱67,000	₱20,000	₱87,000	Arlene Muhlach	₱10,000
15	GMA Supershow Hosts (Supershow Hosts)	Richard Reynoso	₱67,000	₱20,000	₱87,000	Jackie Lou Blanco	₱10,000
15	GMA Supershow Hosts (Supershow Hosts)	Richard Reynoso	₱67,000	₱20,000	₱87,000	John Nite	₱22,000
15	GMA Supershow Hosts (Supershow Hosts)	Richard Reynoso	₱67,000	₱20,000	₱87,000	Vina Morales	₱0
16	Pinoy Big Brother: Celebrity Collab Edition Housemates 3 (PBB Collab Male Housemates)	Brent Manalo	₱62,000	₱20,000	₱82,000	Esnyr	₱20,000
16	Pinoy Big Brother: Celebrity Collab Edition Housemates 3 (PBB Collab Male Housemates)	Brent Manalo	₱62,000	₱20,000	₱82,000	River Joseph	₱14,000
16	Pinoy Big Brother: Celebrity Collab Edition Housemates 3 (PBB Collab Male Housemates)	Brent Manalo	₱62,000	₱20,000	₱82,000	Vince Maristela	₱10,000
16	Pinoy Big Brother: Celebrity Collab Edition Housemates 3 (PBB Collab Male Housemates)	Brent Manalo	₱62,000	₱20,000	₱82,000	Will Ashley	₱8,000
17	Mudrasta Cast	Roderick Paulate	₱62,000	₱15,000	₱77,000	Awra Briguela	₱15,000
17	Mudrasta Cast	Roderick Paulate	₱62,000	₱15,000	₱77,000	Carmi Martin	₱1,000
17	Mudrasta Cast	Roderick Paulate	₱62,000	₱15,000	₱77,000	Raven Molina	₱2,000
17	Mudrasta Cast	Roderick Paulate	₱62,000	₱15,000	₱77,000	Sunshine Teodoro	₱20,000
18	Sexy Streaming Stars (VMX Actresses)	Jenn Rosa	₱61,000	**₱1,000,000**	₱1,061,000	Apple Dy	₱15,000
18	Sexy Streaming Stars (VMX Actresses)	Jenn Rosa	₱61,000	**₱1,000,000**	₱1,061,000	Arah Alonzo	₱14,000
18	Sexy Streaming Stars (VMX Actresses)	Jenn Rosa	₱61,000	**₱1,000,000**	₱1,061,000	Ayanna Misola	₱10,000
18	Sexy Streaming Stars (VMX Actresses)	Jenn Rosa	₱61,000	**₱1,000,000**	₱1,061,000	Zsara Laxamana	₱8,000
19	Noontime Dancers (Wowowee ASF Dancers)	Monette Jimenez	₱67,000	₱25,000	₱92,000	April Gustillo	₱5,000
19	Noontime Dancers (Wowowee ASF Dancers)	Monette Jimenez	₱67,000	₱25,000	₱92,000	Luningning	₱2,000
19	Noontime Dancers (Wowowee ASF Dancers)	Monette Jimenez	₱67,000	₱25,000	₱92,000	Mariposa	₱20,000
19	Noontime Dancers (Wowowee ASF Dancers)	Monette Jimenez	₱67,000	₱25,000	₱92,000	Saicy Aguila	₱12,000
20	That's Entertainment Boys (That's Entertainment Cast Batch 2)	Robert Ortega	₱62,000	₱20,000	₱82,000	Atong Redillas	₱1,000
20	That's Entertainment Boys (That's Entertainment Cast Batch 2)	Robert Ortega	₱62,000	₱20,000	₱82,000	Chuckie Dreyfus	₱20,000
20	That's Entertainment Boys (That's Entertainment Cast Batch 2)	Robert Ortega	₱62,000	₱20,000	₱82,000	Jaypee de Guzman	₱0
20	That's Entertainment Boys (That's Entertainment Cast Batch 2)	Robert Ortega	₱62,000	₱20,000	₱82,000	Jojo Abellana	₱10,000
21	Iconic Dancers	Sherwin Casepe	₱70,000	₱20,000	₱90,000	Denis Sahagon	₱15,000
21	Iconic Dancers	Sherwin Casepe	₱70,000	₱20,000	₱90,000	Geleen Eugenio	₱1,000
21	Iconic Dancers	Sherwin Casepe	₱70,000	₱20,000	₱90,000	Jon Supan	₱0
21	Iconic Dancers	Sherwin Casepe	₱70,000	₱20,000	₱90,000	Mel Feliciano	₱10,000
22	Sexy Moms	Regine Tolentino	₱62,000	₱20,000	₱82,000	Aubrey Miles	₱10,000
22	Sexy Moms	Regine Tolentino	₱62,000	₱20,000	₱82,000	Carla Guevara-Laforteza	₱10,000
22	Sexy Moms	Regine Tolentino	₱62,000	₱20,000	₱82,000	Priscilla Meirelles	₱10,000
22	Sexy Moms	Regine Tolentino	₱62,000	₱20,000	₱82,000	Sheree	₱2,000
23	T.G.I.S. Cast	Ciara Sotto	₱67,000	₱20,000	₱87,000	Bernadette Alyson	₱5,000
23	T.G.I.S. Cast	Ciara Sotto	₱67,000	₱20,000	₱87,000	Bobby Andrews	₱20,000
23	T.G.I.S. Cast	Ciara Sotto	₱67,000	₱20,000	₱87,000	Michael Flores	₱0
23	T.G.I.S. Cast	Ciara Sotto	₱67,000	₱20,000	₱87,000	Polo Ravales	₱10,000
24	Alamat	Mo	₱62,000	₱25,000	₱87,000	Alas	₱15,000
24	Alamat	Mo	₱62,000	₱25,000	₱87,000	Jao	₱22,000
24	Alamat	Mo	₱62,000	₱25,000	₱87,000	R-Ji	₱8,000
24	Alamat	Mo	₱62,000	₱25,000	₱87,000	Taneo	₱2,000
25	Goin' Bulilit Cast 2	Cha-Cha Cañete	₱65,000	₱20,000	₱85,000	Andre Garcia	₱2,000
25	Goin' Bulilit Cast 2	Cha-Cha Cañete	₱65,000	₱20,000	₱85,000	Basty Alcanses	₱8,000
25	Goin' Bulilit Cast 2	Cha-Cha Cañete	₱65,000	₱20,000	₱85,000	CJ Navato	₱20,000
25	Goin' Bulilit Cast 2	Cha-Cha Cañete	₱65,000	₱20,000	₱85,000	Trina Legaspi	₱10,000
26	Showbiz Chikadoras	Mama Loi	₱61,000	₱20,000	₱81,000	Dyosa Pockoh	₱0
26	Showbiz Chikadoras	Mama Loi	₱61,000	₱20,000	₱81,000	Mrena	₱0
26	Showbiz Chikadoras	Mama Loi	₱61,000	₱20,000	₱81,000	Ogie Diaz	₱19,000
26	Showbiz Chikadoras	Mama Loi	₱61,000	₱20,000	₱81,000	Tita Jegs	₱8,000
27	Comedian Friends	DJ Onse	₱67,000	₱20,000	₱87,000	Atakstar	₱1,000
27	Comedian Friends	DJ Onse	₱67,000	₱20,000	₱87,000	Candy Pangilinan	₱0
27	Comedian Friends	DJ Onse	₱67,000	₱20,000	₱87,000	John Lapus	₱15,000
27	Comedian Friends	DJ Onse	₱67,000	₱20,000	₱87,000	Michelle O'Bombshell	₱10,000
28	All-Star Games Players (Star Magic All-Star Games Players)	Diego Gutierrez	₱66,000	₱20,000	₱86,000	Argel Saycon	₱0
28	All-Star Games Players (Star Magic All-Star Games Players)	Diego Gutierrez	₱66,000	₱20,000	₱86,000	Ashton Salvador	₱5,000
28	All-Star Games Players (Star Magic All-Star Games Players)	Diego Gutierrez	₱66,000	₱20,000	₱86,000	Kobie Brown	₱2,000
28	All-Star Games Players (Star Magic All-Star Games Players)	Diego Gutierrez	₱66,000	₱20,000	₱86,000	Tristan Ramirez	₱24,000
29	A Family Affair Cast	Ivana Alawi	₱65,000	₱15,000	₱80,000	Aya Fernandez	₱5,000
29	A Family Affair Cast	Ivana Alawi	₱65,000	₱15,000	₱80,000	Claire Ruiz	₱2,000
29	A Family Affair Cast	Ivana Alawi	₱65,000	₱15,000	₱80,000	Jake Ejercito	₱25,000
29	A Family Affair Cast	Ivana Alawi	₱65,000	₱15,000	₱80,000	Rans Rifol	₱10,000
30	Total Performers	Angela Ken	₱72,000	₱20,000	₱92,000	Alexa Ilacad	₱15,000
30	Total Performers	Angela Ken	₱72,000	₱20,000	₱92,000	Darren Espanto	₱20,000
30	Total Performers	Angela Ken	₱72,000	₱20,000	₱92,000	Maki	₱5,000
30	Total Performers	Angela Ken	₱72,000	₱20,000	₱92,000	Morissette	₱2,000
31	Your Face Sounds Familiar Cast (YFSF Season 4 Cast)	AC Soriano	₱72,000	₱20,000	₱92,000	Dia Maté	₱5,000
31	Your Face Sounds Familiar Cast (YFSF Season 4 Cast)	AC Soriano	₱72,000	₱20,000	₱92,000	Jarlo Bâse	₱20,000
31	Your Face Sounds Familiar Cast (YFSF Season 4 Cast)	AC Soriano	₱72,000	₱20,000	₱92,000	JM Dela Cerna	₱5,000
31	Your Face Sounds Familiar Cast (YFSF Season 4 Cast)	AC Soriano	₱72,000	₱20,000	₱92,000	Rufa Mae Quinto	₱2,000
32	Child Stars (Gen Z Child Stars)	Louise Abuel	₱66,000	₱25,000	₱91,000	Mutya Orquia	₱10,000
32	Child Stars (Gen Z Child Stars)	Louise Abuel	₱66,000	₱25,000	₱91,000	Rhed Bustamante	₱8,000
32	Child Stars (Gen Z Child Stars)	Louise Abuel	₱66,000	₱25,000	₱91,000	Xyriel Manabat	₱15,000
32	Child Stars (Gen Z Child Stars)	Louise Abuel	₱66,000	₱25,000	₱91,000	Zaijian Jaranilla	₱24,000
33	Beauty Queens	Nicole Cordoves	₱62,000	₱25,000	₱87,000	Ariella Arida	₱20,000
33	Beauty Queens	Nicole Cordoves	₱62,000	₱25,000	₱87,000	Bea Rose Santiago	₱0
33	Beauty Queens	Nicole Cordoves	₱62,000	₱25,000	₱87,000	Chelsea Manalo	₱0
33	Beauty Queens	Nicole Cordoves	₱62,000	₱25,000	₱87,000	Hannah Arnold	₱5,000
34	Jeproks: The Musical Cast	Jeffrey Hidalgo	₱72,000	₱20,000	₱92,000	David Ezra	₱20,000
34	Jeproks: The Musical Cast	Jeffrey Hidalgo	₱72,000	₱20,000	₱92,000	Frannie Zamora	₱2,000
34	Jeproks: The Musical Cast	Jeffrey Hidalgo	₱72,000	₱20,000	₱92,000	Geneva Cruz	₱1,000
34	Jeproks: The Musical Cast	Jeffrey Hidalgo	₱72,000	₱20,000	₱92,000	Nino Alejandro	₱2,000
35	Comic Actors	Bayani Agbayani	₱67,000	₱20,000	₱87,000	Empoy Marquez	₱15,000
35	Comic Actors	Bayani Agbayani	₱67,000	₱20,000	₱87,000	Moi Bien	₱0
35	Comic Actors	Bayani Agbayani	₱67,000	₱20,000	₱87,000	Viveika Ravanes	₱5,000
35	Comic Actors	Bayani Agbayani	₱67,000	₱20,000	₱87,000	Whitney Tyson	₱0
36	Sidekicks	Kitkat	₱64,000	₱20,000	₱84,000	Cai Cortez	₱20,000
36	Sidekicks	Kitkat	₱64,000	₱20,000	₱84,000	Donna Cariaga	₱12,000
36	Sidekicks	Kitkat	₱64,000	₱20,000	₱84,000	Kat Galang	₱10,000
36	Sidekicks	Kitkat	₱64,000	₱20,000	₱84,000	Via Antonio	₱5,000
37	That's Entertainment Cast (That's Entertainment Cast Batch 3)	DJ Durano	₱62,000	₱15,000	₱77,000	Don Umali	₱12,000
37	That's Entertainment Cast (That's Entertainment Cast Batch 3)	DJ Durano	₱62,000	₱15,000	₱77,000	Karen Timbol	₱8,000
37	That's Entertainment Cast (That's Entertainment Cast Batch 3)	DJ Durano	₱62,000	₱15,000	₱77,000	Tyrone Sason	₱1,000
37	That's Entertainment Cast (That's Entertainment Cast Batch 3)	DJ Durano	₱62,000	₱15,000	₱77,000	Vincent Berba	₱5,000
38	What Lies Beneath Cast	Marlo Mortel	₱67,000	₱25,000	₱92,000	Andi Abaya	₱20,000
38	What Lies Beneath Cast	Marlo Mortel	₱67,000	₱25,000	₱92,000	Jameson Blake	₱2,000
38	What Lies Beneath Cast	Marlo Mortel	₱67,000	₱25,000	₱92,000	Kaila Estrada	₱2,000
38	What Lies Beneath Cast	Marlo Mortel	₱67,000	₱25,000	₱92,000	Race Matias	₱10,000
39	Power Diva and Friends	Jervi Wrightson	₱61,000	₱25,000	₱86,000	Angeline Quinto	₱20,000
39	Power Diva and Friends	Jervi Wrightson	₱61,000	₱25,000	₱86,000	Jeremy Glinoga	₱0
39	Power Diva and Friends	Jervi Wrightson	₱61,000	₱25,000	₱86,000	Kean Cipriano	₱15,000
39	Power Diva and Friends	Jervi Wrightson	₱61,000	₱25,000	₱86,000	Khimo Gumatay	₱2,000
40	Sexy Stars 1	Pamela Ortiz	₱62,000	₱20,000	₱82,000	Hazel Espinosa	₱10,000
40	Sexy Stars 1	Pamela Ortiz	₱62,000	₱20,000	₱82,000	Katrina Paula	₱0
40	Sexy Stars 1	Pamela Ortiz	₱62,000	₱20,000	₱82,000	Sabrina M.	₱20,000
40	Sexy Stars 1	Pamela Ortiz	₱62,000	₱20,000	₱82,000	Zara Lopez	₱8,000
41	News Personalities 3 (ABS-CBN News Personalities)	Michael Delizo	₱62,000	₱25,000	₱87,000	Anna Cerezo	₱5,000
41	News Personalities 3 (ABS-CBN News Personalities)	Michael Delizo	₱62,000	₱25,000	₱87,000	Gus Abelgas	₱0
41	News Personalities 3 (ABS-CBN News Personalities)	Michael Delizo	₱62,000	₱25,000	₱87,000	Izzy Lee	₱8,000
41	News Personalities 3 (ABS-CBN News Personalities)	Michael Delizo	₱62,000	₱25,000	₱87,000	Jeff Caparas	₱0
42	Sylvia and Friends (I'mPerfect Cast)	Zaijian Jaranilla	₱67,000	₱25,000	₱92,000	Eric Nicolas	₱2,000
42	Sylvia and Friends (I'mPerfect Cast)	Zaijian Jaranilla	₱67,000	₱25,000	₱92,000	Maureen Mauricio	₱1,000
42	Sylvia and Friends (I'mPerfect Cast)	Zaijian Jaranilla	₱67,000	₱25,000	₱92,000	Smokey Manaloto	₱12,000
42	Sylvia and Friends (I'mPerfect Cast)	Zaijian Jaranilla	₱67,000	₱25,000	₱92,000	Sylvia Sanchez	₱2,000
43	Ghosting Cast	Fyang Smith	₱61,000	₱20,000	₱81,000	Benjie Paras	₱5,000
43	Ghosting Cast	Fyang Smith	₱61,000	₱20,000	₱81,000	Hyubs Azarcon	₱24,000
43	Ghosting Cast	Fyang Smith	₱61,000	₱20,000	₱81,000	JM Ibarra	₱8,000
43	Ghosting Cast	Fyang Smith	₱61,000	₱20,000	₱81,000	Milo Elmido Jr.	₱0
44	That's Entertainment Cast 2 (That's Entertainment Cast Batch 4)	Jeffrey Santos	₱65,000	₱20,000	₱85,000	Ana Abiera	₱15,000
44	That's Entertainment Cast 2 (That's Entertainment Cast Batch 4)	Jeffrey Santos	₱65,000	₱20,000	₱85,000	Lovely Rivera	₱12,000
44	That's Entertainment Cast 2 (That's Entertainment Cast Batch 4)	Jeffrey Santos	₱65,000	₱20,000	₱85,000	Patricia Javier	₱0
44	That's Entertainment Cast 2 (That's Entertainment Cast Batch 4)	Jeffrey Santos	₱65,000	₱20,000	₱85,000	Sheryl Cruz	₱10,000
45	Character Actors (Kontrabida Actors/Showbiz Villains)	Ryan Eigenmann	₱65,000	₱25,000	₱90,000	Al Tantay	₱8,000
45	Character Actors (Kontrabida Actors/Showbiz Villains)	Ryan Eigenmann	₱65,000	₱25,000	₱90,000	Baron Geisler	₱25,000
45	Character Actors (Kontrabida Actors/Showbiz Villains)	Ryan Eigenmann	₱65,000	₱25,000	₱90,000	Gerhard Acao	₱10,000
45	Character Actors (Kontrabida Actors/Showbiz Villains)	Ryan Eigenmann	₱65,000	₱25,000	₱90,000	William Lorenzo	₱2,000
46	Sexy Stars 2	Ynez Veneracion	₱65,000	₱15,000	₱80,000	Allana Amor	₱10,000
46	Sexy Stars 2	Ynez Veneracion	₱65,000	₱15,000	₱80,000	Alma Concepcion	₱24,000
46	Sexy Stars 2	Ynez Veneracion	₱65,000	₱15,000	₱80,000	Lara Morena	₱15,000
46	Sexy Stars 2	Ynez Veneracion	₱65,000	₱15,000	₱80,000	Natasha Ledesma	₱2,000
47	Goin' Bulilit Cast 3	Clarence Delgado	₱62,000	₱25,000	₱87,000	Bea Basa	₱5,000
47	Goin' Bulilit Cast 3	Clarence Delgado	₱62,000	₱25,000	₱87,000	Brenna Garcia	₱20,000
47	Goin' Bulilit Cast 3	Clarence Delgado	₱62,000	₱25,000	₱87,000	Izzy Canillo	₱1,000
47	Goin' Bulilit Cast 3	Clarence Delgado	₱62,000	₱25,000	₱87,000	Raikko Mateo	₱0
48	Funny Ladies	Dang Cruz	₱62,000	₱25,000	₱87,000	Janna Dominguez	₱10,000
48	Funny Ladies	Dang Cruz	₱62,000	₱25,000	₱87,000	Marissa Sanchez	₱2,000
48	Funny Ladies	Dang Cruz	₱62,000	₱25,000	₱87,000	Mel Kimura	₱1,000
48	Funny Ladies	Dang Cruz	₱62,000	₱25,000	₱87,000	Wilma Doesnt	₱9,000
49	Child Stars (Original Child Stars)	Michael Roy Jornales	₱67,000	₱25,000	₱92,000	Ice Seguerra	₱10,000
49	Child Stars (Original Child Stars)	Michael Roy Jornales	₱67,000	₱25,000	₱92,000	Niño Muhlach	₱5,000
49	Child Stars (Original Child Stars)	Michael Roy Jornales	₱67,000	₱25,000	₱92,000	RR Herrera	₱12,000
49	Child Stars (Original Child Stars)	Michael Roy Jornales	₱67,000	₱25,000	₱92,000	Vandolph Quizon	₱20,000
50	Sisa Cast	Nico Antonio	₱64,000	₱25,000	₱89,000	Angelie Sanoy	₱0
50	Sisa Cast	Nico Antonio	₱64,000	₱25,000	₱89,000	Barbara Miguel	₱20,000
50	Sisa Cast	Nico Antonio	₱64,000	₱25,000	₱89,000	Eugene Domingo	₱19,000
50	Sisa Cast	Nico Antonio	₱64,000	₱25,000	₱89,000	Jorrybell Agoto	₱8,000
51	That's Entertainment Cast 3 (That's Entertainment Cast Batch 5)	Jovit Moya	₱67,000	₱20,000	₱87,000	Brylle Mondejar	₱10,000
51	That's Entertainment Cast 3 (That's Entertainment Cast Batch 5)	Jovit Moya	₱67,000	₱20,000	₱87,000	Cris Villanueva	₱15,000
51	That's Entertainment Cast 3 (That's Entertainment Cast Batch 5)	Jovit Moya	₱67,000	₱20,000	₱87,000	Migui Moreno	₱20,000
51	That's Entertainment Cast 3 (That's Entertainment Cast Batch 5)	Jovit Moya	₱67,000	₱20,000	₱87,000	Ronel Wolfe	₱0
52	Sexy Sirens	Yda Manzano	₱62,000	₱20,000	₱82,000	Alynna Velasquez	₱9,000
52	Sexy Sirens	Yda Manzano	₱62,000	₱20,000	₱82,000	Jen Rosendahl	₱20,000
52	Sexy Sirens	Yda Manzano	₱62,000	₱20,000	₱82,000	Katherine Luna	₱2,000
52	Sexy Sirens	Yda Manzano	₱62,000	₱20,000	₱82,000	Krista Miller	₱15,000
53	That's Entertainment Cast 4 (That's Entertainment Cast Batch 6)	Maffi Papin	₱65,000	₱25,000	₱90,000	Donita Rose	₱5,000
53	That's Entertainment Cast 4 (That's Entertainment Cast Batch 6)	Maffi Papin	₱65,000	₱25,000	₱90,000	Regine Grace	₱8,000
53	That's Entertainment Cast 4 (That's Entertainment Cast Batch 6)	Maffi Papin	₱65,000	₱25,000	₱90,000	Rita Avila	₱15,000
53	That's Entertainment Cast 4 (That's Entertainment Cast Batch 6)	Maffi Papin	₱65,000	₱25,000	₱90,000	Sharmaine Arnaiz	₱2,000
54	The Zaddies (Hunk Actors)	Carlo Maceda	₱57,000	₱15,000	₱72,000	James Blanco	₱5,000
54	The Zaddies (Hunk Actors)	Carlo Maceda	₱57,000	₱15,000	₱72,000	Luke Jickain	₱10,000
54	The Zaddies (Hunk Actors)	Carlo Maceda	₱57,000	₱15,000	₱72,000	Marcus Madrigal	₱0
54	The Zaddies (Hunk Actors)	Carlo Maceda	₱57,000	₱15,000	₱72,000	Paolo Paraiso	₱20,000
55	Pinoy Rappers (OPM Rappers)	Ruby Yumage	₱65,000	₱25,000	₱90,000	Bassilyo	₱20,000
55	Pinoy Rappers (OPM Rappers)	Ruby Yumage	₱65,000	₱25,000	₱90,000	Crispin	₱5,000
55	Pinoy Rappers (OPM Rappers)	Ruby Yumage	₱65,000	₱25,000	₱90,000	Kial	₱12,000
55	Pinoy Rappers (OPM Rappers)	Ruby Yumage	₱65,000	₱25,000	₱90,000	Sisa	₱5,000
56	Bisdak Singers (Provincial Singers)	Mark Bautista	₱61,000	₱25,000	₱86,000	Dulce	₱8,000
56	Bisdak Singers (Provincial Singers)	Mark Bautista	₱61,000	₱25,000	₱86,000	Jason Dy	₱5,000
56	Bisdak Singers (Provincial Singers)	Mark Bautista	₱61,000	₱25,000	₱86,000	Marielle Montellano	₱5,000
56	Bisdak Singers (Provincial Singers)	Mark Bautista	₱61,000	₱25,000	₱86,000	Sofronio Vasquez	₱20,000
Total			₱3,647,000	₱3,175,000	₱6,822,000		₱2,033,000
Grand Total			₱8,855,000				

=== Rainbow Reveal results ===
Here is the outcome of the Rainbow Reveal jackpot round, detailing the number of correct answers each Rally to the Top winner achieved in the Rapid Rumble round, along with the dice results each contestant rolled during the jackpot round.

For the first season, each contestant starts with 60 seconds for the jackpot round, with the opportunity to extend it to 72 seconds by correctly answering all six Rapid Rumble questions. Note that any DRM marked with an "X" indicates that the roll was not counted as time had expired. For the second season, each contestant is given a fixed time of 60 seconds to roll all six dies, with a free roll (for the first DRM) being given should the contestant answer three out of six Rapid Rumble questions.

In cases where the required sequence of colored rolls is not followed (for instance, if the second DRM is skipped, but the third and fourth are counted), it indicates that the contestant rolled the same color as the previous DRM and failed to roll a new, unique color in time.

Warning: the following table presents a significant amount of different colors.

==== Season 1 ====
Aiah Arceta (Bini 2, ep. 46) had the most number of correct answers, with 5 out of 6.

List of Rainbow Reveal results (season 1)
Episode No.	Rapid Rumble		Final Time Allotted	Rainbow Reveal					
Episode No.	No. of correct answers	Addtl. time	Final Time Allotted	DRM 1	DRM 2	DRM 3	DRM 4	DRM 5	DRM 6
1	not featured		60 secs.	PU	**R**	**Y**	**PI**	X mark	X mark
2	2	4 secs.	64 secs.	G	**R**	X mark	**Y**	**B**	X mark
3	2	4 secs.	64 secs.	PU	**B**	**G**	**PI**	**Y**	**R**
4	0	0 secs.	60 secs.	B	**PU**	**G**	**PI**	X mark	X mark
5	0	0 secs.	60 secs.	B	**PI**	**Y**	**G**	**PU**	X mark
6	1	2 secs.	62 secs.	G	**Y**	**PI**	**PU**	**B**	X mark
7	0	0 secs.	60 secs.	R	**G**	**PI**	**PU**	**Y**	X mark
8	0	0 secs.	60 secs.	B	**Y**	**R**	**G**	X mark	X mark
9	1	2 secs.	62 secs.	R	**PU**	**B**	X mark	X mark	X mark
10	0	0 secs.	60 secs.	R	**B**	**Y**	X mark	X mark	X mark
11	1	2 secs.	62 secs.	B	**Y**	**R**	**PU**	**G**	**PI**
12	3	6 secs.	66 secs.	R	**B**	**Y**	**PU**	X mark	X mark
13	0	0 secs.	60 secs.	G	**Y**	**B**	**R**	X mark	**PU**
14	2	4 secs.	64 secs.	G	X mark	**PU**	**PI**	**Y**	X mark
15	0	0 secs.	60 secs.	G	**B**	**PU**	**R**	**PI**	X mark
16	1	2 secs.	62 secs.	G	**B**	**PI**	**PU**	**R**	X mark
17	0	0 secs.	60 secs.	PI	**PU**	**Y**	**R**	X mark	X mark
18	1	2 secs.	62 secs.	B	**Y**	**R**	**PI**	X mark	X mark
19	1	2 secs.	62 secs.	PU	**PI**	**R**	**B**	X mark	X mark
20	0	0 secs.	60 secs.	Y	**R**	**PI**	**PU**	X mark	**G**
21	1	2 secs.	62 secs.	PI	**B**	**Y**	X mark	X mark	**G**
22	0	0 secs.	60 secs.	Y	**PU**	**PI**	X mark	X mark	X mark
23	0	0 secs.	60 secs.	G	**PI**	**PU**	**R**	X mark	X mark
24	0	0 secs.	60 secs.	Y	**PU**	**PI**	X mark	**G**	X mark
25	0	0 secs.	60 secs.	Y	**PU**	**R**	**PI**	X mark	X mark
26	2	4 secs.	64 secs.	R	**B**	X mark	**PI**	**Y**	X mark
27	0	0 secs.	60 secs.	G	**R**	**PI**	**Y**	**B**	X mark
28	0	0 secs.	60 secs.	R	**B**	**PU**	**G**	X mark	X mark
29	3	6 secs.	66 secs.	B	**G**	**R**	X mark	**Y**	X mark
30	0	0 secs.	60 secs.	G	**PI**	**Y**	**B**	X mark	X mark
31	not featured		60 secs.	PI	**PU**	**R**	**B**	X mark	X mark
32	0	0 secs.	60 secs.	Y	**R**	**PI**	X mark	**B**	X mark
33	2	4 secs.	64 secs.	PU	**PI**	X mark	**G**	X mark	X mark
34	0	0 secs.	60 secs.	B	**PU**	**Y**	**R**	**G**	X mark
35	4	8 secs.	68 secs.	PI	X mark	**G**	X mark	X mark	X mark
36	1	2 secs.	62 secs.	PI	**PU**	**R**	**G**	X mark	**Y**
37	1	2 secs.	62 secs.	PU	**G**	**B**	**R**	**PI**	X mark
38	0	0 secs.	60 secs.	PU	**PI**	**R**	X mark	**Y**	X mark
39	1	2 secs.	62 secs.	PI	**PU**	**B**	**Y**	X mark	X mark
40	1	2 secs.	62 secs.	G	**Y**	**PU**	X mark	**B**	X mark
41	1	2 secs.	62 secs.	PI	**G**	X mark	**R**	X mark	**B**
42	1	2 secs.	62 secs.	B	**PU**	**R**	**Y**	X mark	X mark
43	2	4 secs.	64 secs.	PU	**B**	**R**	**Y**	X mark	X mark
44	3	6 secs.	66 secs.	PI	**PU**	**G**	**Y**	**B**	X mark
45	3	6 secs.	66 secs.	B	**Y**	**G**	**R**	**PU**	X mark
46	5	10 secs.	70 secs.	Y	**PU**	**R**	**PI**	X mark	X mark
47	1	2 secs.	62 secs.	PU	**PI**	**R**	**G**	**Y**	X mark
48	0	0 secs.	60 secs.	G	**B**	**PU**	X mark	**Y**	X mark
49	2	4 secs.	64 secs.	PU	**PI**	**Y**	**G**	X mark	X mark
50	1	2 secs.	62 secs.	Y	**R**	**G**	**PU**	**PI**	X mark

==== Season 2 ====
Seventeen players have reached three correct answers as of the latest episode.

List of Rainbow Reveal results (season 2)
Episode No.	Rapid Rumble		Rainbow Reveal					
Episode No.	No. of correct answers	Free roll achieved?	DRM 1	DRM 2	DRM 3	DRM 4	DRM 5	DRM 6
1	1	No	PI	**B**	**Y**	X mark	**PU**	X mark
2	0	No	PU	**Y**	**R**	**G**	X mark	**PI**
3	2	No	PU	**Y**	X mark	**G**	**R**	X mark
4	1	No	PI	**G**	**R**	**Y**	X mark	X mark
5	0	No	PU	**G**	**PI**	X mark	X mark	**R**
6	**3**	Yes	R	**PU**	**PI**	**B**	**Y**	X mark
7	**3**	Yes	B	**PI**	**G**	**Y**	**R**	**PU**
8	1	No	B	**PU**	**R**	**PI**	X mark	X mark
9	1	No	B	**Y**	**PI**	**G**	**R**	X mark
10	2	No	R	**PU**	**B**	**Y**	**PI**	X mark
11	2	No	G	**PU**	**B**	**PI**	**R**	X mark
12	**3**	Yes	Y	**PI**	**G**	**R**	**PU**	X mark
13	2	No	PU	**Y**	**R**	**PI**	**G**	X mark
14	0	No	G	**R**	**PI**	**B**	X mark	**Y**
15	2	No	G	**R**	**PI**	**B**	X mark	X mark
16	0	No	R	**B**	**Y**	X mark	X mark	**PI**
17	2	No	G	X mark	**R**	X mark	**Y**	X mark
18	0	No	PI	**G**	**Y**	**B**	**PU**	**R**
19	2	No	PU	**Y**	**PI**	**R**	**G**	X mark
20	1	No	R	**PU**	**B**	X mark	**Y**	X mark
21	1	No	G	**R**	**PI**	**B**	X mark	X mark
22	0	No	PI	**R**	**PU**	X mark	X mark	**G**
23	1	No	Y	**B**	**G**	**PU**	X mark	X mark
24	1	No	G	**PI**	**Y**	**PU**	**B**	X mark
25	2	No	B	**PU**	**Y**	**G**	X mark	X mark
26	1	No	PI	**R**	X mark	**Y**	**PU**	X mark
27	0	No	PU	X mark	**Y**	**B**	**R**	X mark
28	2	No	PI	**B**	**R**	**PU**	X mark	X mark
29	1	No	G	X mark	**PU**	**B**	X mark	X mark
30	2	No	B	**PI**	**G**	**Y**	X mark	X mark
31	1	No	B	**PU**	**PI**	**G**	X mark	X mark
32	2	No	Y	**B**	**R**	**G**	X mark	**PI**
33	**3**	Yes	Y	**B**	**PI**	**G**	**PU**	X mark
34	1	No	Y	**G**	X mark	X mark	**PI**	**B**
35	1	No	R	**PI**	**Y**	X mark	**B**	X mark
36	1	No	PU	**PI**	**B**	X mark	**G**	X mark
37	2	No	G	**R**	**B**	X mark	X mark	X mark
38	**3**	Yes	G	**B**	**PU**	**R**	X mark	**PI**
39	**3**	Yes	R	**PI**	**Y**	**B**	X mark	**PU**
40	1	No	G	**PU**	**Y**	**R**	X mark	X mark
41	**3**	Yes	Y	**PI**	**G**	**R**	X mark	**B**
42	**3**	Yes	PI	**B**	**PU**	**G**	**Y**	X mark
43	2	No	Y	**B**	X mark	**PI**	**G**	X mark
44	2	No	PI	**R**	**PU**	**Y**	X mark	X mark
45	1	No	R	**PI**	**PU**	**G**	X mark	**B**
46	2	No	R	**PU**	**PI**	X mark	X mark	X mark
47	**3**	Yes	R	**Y**	**B**	**G**	**PU**	X mark
48	**3**	Yes	Y	**G**	**R**	**B**	**PI**	X mark
49	**3**	Yes	B	**R**	**Y**	**PI**	X mark	**G**
50	**3**	Yes	Y	**R**	**B**	**G**	X mark	**PU**
51	**3**	Yes	Y	**PI**	**G**	**B**	X mark	X mark
52	1	No	B	**R**	**G**	**PI**	X mark	X mark
53	**3**	Yes	Y	**PU**	**R**	**G**	X mark	**PI**
54	**3**	Yes	R	**B**	**PI**	X mark	X mark	X mark
55	**3**	Yes	B	**PU**	**R**	**G**	**Y**	X mark
56	**3**	Yes	B	**PI**	**G**	**Y**	X mark	**R**

=== Returning players ===
In some instances, players may appear as members of a different group after their initial appearance on the show. Players are listed according to their second appearance. If a contestant appears in more than two episodes, they remain listed under the number assigned during their second appearance. In episodes featuring multiple returnees, returning players are arranged alphabetically. Amount values in bold signifies that the player is the winner for that episode.

The Power Diva and Friends group (s.2, ep. 39) is the first episode in the series to feature a group of returning players.

The following players below reached the following milestones:

- First overall returnee across different seasons: Iyah Mina
- First returnee to appear in two episodes within the same season: Xyriel Manabat
- First returnee to win Rally to the Top more than once: AC Soriano

List of Rainbow Rumble's returning players
No.	Player	Appearances	Final prize won	Total cash prize
1	Iyah Mina	Stand-Up Comedians (s1, ep. 24)	₱20,000	₱20,000
1	Iyah Mina	LGBTQIA+ Achievers (s2, ep. 1)	₱0	₱20,000
2	Gerald Anderson	Drama Moto Club (s1, ep. 1)	₱10,000	₱18,000
2	Gerald Anderson	Sins of the Father Cast 1 (s2, ep. 2)	₱8,000	₱18,000
3	Jeremiah Lisbo	Pamilya Sagrado Cast 1 (s1, ep. 11)	₱20,000	₱22,000
3	Jeremiah Lisbo	Sins of the Father Cast 2 (s2, ep. 3)	₱2,000	₱22,000
4	AC Soriano	Online Hosts (s1, ep. 25)	**₱82,000**	₱174,000
4	AC Soriano	Your Face Sounds Familiar Cast (s2, ep. 31)	**₱92,000**	₱174,000
5	Xyriel Manabat	Pinoy Big Brother: Celebrity Collab Edition Housemates 2 (s2, ep. 13)	₱15,000	₱30,000
5	Xyriel Manabat	Child Stars (s2, ep. 32)	₱15,000	₱30,000
6	Angeline Quinto	I Can See Your Voice SINGvestigators (s1, ep. 33)	**₱80,000**	₱100,000
6	Angeline Quinto	Power Diva and Friends (s2, ep. 39)	₱20,000	₱100,000
7	Jeremy Glinoga	iWant ASAP Squadmates (s1, ep. 9)	₱2,000	₱2,000
7	Jeremy Glinoga	Power Diva and Friends (s2, ep. 39)	₱0	₱2,000
8	Jervi Wrightson	LGBTQIA+ Achievers (s2, ep. 1)	₱20,000	₱106,000
8	Jervi Wrightson	Power Diva and Friends (s2, ep. 39)	**₱86,000**	₱106,000
9	Kean Cipriano	ASAP Sessionistas (s1, ep. 15)	₱1,000	₱16,000
9	Kean Cipriano	Power Diva and Friends (s2, ep. 39)	₱15,000	₱16,000
10	Khimo Gumatay	Talent Reality Show Champions (s1, ep. 43)	₱8,000	₱10,000
10	Khimo Gumatay	Power Diva and Friends (s2, ep. 39)	₱2,000	₱10,000
11	Eric Nicolas	Lavender Fields Cast 1 (s1, ep. 29)	₱5,000	₱7,000
11	Eric Nicolas	Sylvia and Friends (s2, ep. 42)	₱2,000	₱7,000
12	Zaijian Jaranilla	Child Stars (s2, ep. 32)	₱24,000	₱116,000
12	Zaijian Jaranilla	Sylvia and Friends (s2, ep. 42)	**₱92,000**	₱116,000
13	Fyang Smith	Pinoy Big Brother: Gen 11 Ex-Housemates 1 (s1, ep. 39)	₱8,000	₱89,000
13	Fyang Smith	Ghosting Cast (s2, ep. 43)	**₱81,000**	₱89,000
14	JM Ibarra	Pinoy Big Brother: Gen 11 Ex-Housemates 1 (s1, ep. 39)	₱10,000	₱18,000
14	JM Ibarra	Ghosting Cast (s2, ep. 43)	₱8,000	₱18,000
15	Ice Seguerra	ASAP Sessionistas (s1, ep. 15)	₱0	₱10,000
15	Ice Seguerra	Child Stars (s2, ep. 49)	₱10,000	₱10,000
16	Sharmaine Arnaiz	That's Entertainment Iconic Ladies (s2, ep. 14)	₱5,000	₱7,000
16	Sharmaine Arnaiz	That's Entertainment Cast 4 (s2, ep. 53)	₱2,000	₱7,000
17	Bassilyo	Tondo Gang of FPJ's Batang Quiapo (s1, ep. 2)	**₱67,000**	₱87,000
17	Bassilyo	Pinoy Rappers (s2, ep. 55)	₱20,000	₱87,000
18	Jason Dy	Talent Reality Show Champions (s1, ep. 43)	**₱61,000**	₱66,000
18	Jason Dy	Bisdak Singers (s2, ep. 56)	₱5,000	₱66,000

== Soundtrack ==
"Color Clash"
- Single cover

Song by WRIVE

from the album Wrive
- Released: July 15, 2024
- Genre: Pop
- Length: 2:21
- Label: ABS-CBN Film Productions, Inc.
- Songwriter: Willy Cuevas
- Producer: Jonathan Manalo

WRIVE singles chronology
"Hollywood" (2024)	"Color Clash" (2024)	"Ooh La La" (2025)

Lyric video
- "Color Clash" on YouTube

The show's soundtrack is entitled "Color Clash" by P-pop boy band Wrive, consisting of members Asi, Drei, Ishiro, Matthew, and Russu, who were contestants of the survival reality show Dream Maker: The Search for the Next Global Pop Group. It was digitally released on streaming platforms on July 15, 2024. To promote the song, the group performed the song on ASAP and its digital companion show iWantASAP, and appeared as guest artists on the finale of the fifth season of I Can See Your Voice on July 14, 2024, and appeared on It's Showtime's digital companion show Showtime Online Ü on July 20, 2024.

The song is included as a bonus track on their self-titled debut album, which was released on January 16, 2026.

== Reception ==
During its pilot week, the show received a 4.8% and 3.9% rating from AGB Nielsen Philippines for the July 20 and 21, 2024 episodes, respectively, and had a combined peak of 245,820 concurrent viewers online. The hashtags #ThisIsRainbowRumble, #RainbowRumbleTondo, and #Wrive_ColorClash, along with the phrase "Wrive ON RAINBOW RUMBLE" trended on X. In the weeks that followed, the show continued to break its concurrent viewer records, peaking at 908,961 during the October 26 and 27 episodes, which featured the first batch of the cast of Lavender Fields and the boy group Streetboys.

The second season earned a 2.1% and 1.9% rating for the June 28 and 29, 2025 episodes, respectively, and had a combined peak of 406,519 concurrent viewers online.

=== Awards and nominations ===
Year	Award	Category	Nominee(s)	Result	Ref.
2025	Anak TV Seal Awards	Household Favorite Program for Television	Rainbow Rumble	Won	
2025	6th Alta Media Icon Awards	Best Game Show Host	Luis Manzano	Won	
2025	38th PMPC Star Awards for Television	Best Game Show Host	Luis Manzano and Negi	Nominated	
2025	38th PMPC Star Awards for Television	Best Game Show	Rainbow Rumble	Nominated	
2025	Platinum Stallion National Media Awards	Best Variety Show Host	Luis Manzano	Won	
2025	Platinum Stallion National Media Awards	Best Game Show	Rainbow Rumble	Won	
2025	28th KBP Golden Dove Awards	Best Variety Program Host	Luis Manzano	Won	
