= Bumb =

Bumb is a surname. Notable people with the surname include:

- Ambika Bumb, American chief executive and scientist
- Dionisiu Bumb (born 1973), Romanian footballer
- Renée Marie Bumb (born 1960), American jurist

== See also ==
- Bumb (drum), an instrument used in the music of Uttar Pradesh, India
- Bomb (disambiguation)
- Bum (disambiguation)
- Bump (disambiguation)
