= AC Soriano =

Filipino content creator

- Born: Allan Soriano
- Education: De La Salle–College of Saint Benilde
- Occupations: Content creator; host
- Known for: Parodies of Jodi Sta. Maria and Toni Gonzaga; The Broken Marriage Vow remixes

Allan "AC" Soriano is a Filipino content creator, filmmaker, and online host. He is best known for his viral impersonations of celebrities, particularly actress Jodi Sta. Maria and host Toni Gonzaga. Soriano gained widespread popularity for his satirical content related to Philippine pop culture and politics, as well as his remixes of scenes from the drama series The Broken Marriage Vow. He is currently a host for the online variety show It's Showtime Online U.

== Early life and education ==
Allan Soriano was raised primarily by his grandmother while his mother worked overseas as an Overseas Filipino Worker (OFW). He grew up in what he described as a "feminine household," which he credits for his high respect for women. Soriano stated that his close relationship with his grandmother allowed him to live openly as a queer person without needing to formally "come out," as his family accepted him for who he was.

He attended the De La Salle–College of Saint Benilde, where he graduated with a degree in Digital Filmmaking. Before transitioning to full-time content creation, Soriano worked in Japan. During his time there, he began vlogging with an iPad to document his daily life and maintain connections with his friends in the Philippines.

== Career ==
=== Content creation ===
Soriano became popular on social media platforms like TikTok and Twitter for his comedic skits, parodies, and commentary. He gained significant attention in 2022 when he produced a live online show on Instagram titled "Jodi Sta. Maria: The Unauthorized Rusical." In this one-man production, he impersonated various characters played by actress Jodi Sta. Maria, including Maya from Be Careful with My Heart, Amor Powers from Pangako Sa 'Yo, and Dr. Jill Ilustre from The Broken Marriage Vow. Sta. Maria herself watched the livestream, praising Soriano's effort and performance. She noted that the parody helped spread awareness about her show.

During the broadcast of The Broken Marriage Vow, Soriano created an EDM remix of a confrontation scene from the series. The remix featured the dialogue "Your daughter is sleeping with my husband" and "Papunta pa lang tayo sa exciting part" (transl. We are just getting to the exciting part) set to the track "Satisfaction" by Benny Benassi. The line "Papunta pa lang tayo sa exciting part" became a viral meme, used by government agencies such as the Department of Transportation and institutions like the Ayala Museum in their social media posts. In May 2022, Soriano performed this remix live on national television during an episode of ASAP Natin 'To.

=== Political satire ===
During the 2022 Philippine presidential election, Soriano developed a satirical character named "Otin G," a parody of multimedia host Toni Gonzaga. Soriano, who was previously a fan of Gonzaga, created the character to express his disappointment regarding her political endorsement of Bongbong Marcos He used the character to satirize Gonzaga's hosting style and performed at campaign rallies for presidential candidate Leni Robredo.

In January 2023, Soriano organized a free online concert on TikTok titled "I Am Otin." The event was scheduled to coincide with Toni Gonzaga's 20th-anniversary concert at the Smart Araneta Coliseum. The livestream trended on social media and featured guest appearances from other creators like Sassa Gurl. Soriano pledged to donate the earnings from the livestream gifts, which amounted to approximately ₱11,000, to the Home for the Golden Gays. He stated that he would double the amount from his own funds before donating.

=== Hosting ===
In August 2023, Soriano was introduced as a new regular host for Showtime Online U. He joined the program during its seventh anniversary celebration, co-hosting alongside other internet personalities.

In October 2025, Soriano was announced as an online host for the fourth season of the impersonation talent show Your Face Sounds Familiar.

== Advocacy and personal life ==
Soriano identifies as a member of the LGBTQ+ community. He has participated in advocacy campaigns, such as the "Project Headshot Clinic" Pride 2022 campaign, which promoted HIV/AIDS awareness and equal rights. He refers to his community of followers and the nature of his humor as "dogshow," a term he reclaimed to describe satirical teasing.

== Filmography ==
Television
Year	Title	Role	Ref.
2022	ASAP Natin 'To	Guest performer	
2023–present	It's Showtime Online U	Host	
2025	Rainbow Rumble	Contestant	
2025–present	Your Face Sounds Familiar	Host	
