= Bum, Afghanistan =

Group of locations in Kandahar Province, Afghanistan

Bum
- Location in Afghanistan
- Coordinates: 32°6′6″N 65°37′0″E
- Country: Afghanistan
- Province: Kandahar Province
- Time zone: UTC+4:30

Bum is the name of several locations in Afghanistan.

The first of these is a village in the northeastern part of Khakrez Valley, about 36 miles round the u-bend from Kandahar. Around the turn of the 20th century, it was reported as containing around 40 Alikozai households.

It is also the name given to the part of the Khakrez Valley in which the village lies. There has more recently been another village with this name reported. This village, at 32.55°N 67.13°E, is located about one mile south of the Helmand River.

== See also ==
- Kandahar Province
