= AG Saño =

Filipino muralist and environmental activist

Amado Guerrero Saño, also known as AG Saño, is a Filipino muralist, conservationist, photographer, landscape architect, and environmental activist best known for numerous prominent advocacy murals along main thoroughfares around the Philippines' National Capital Region, promoting themes including marine wildlife conservation, peace, environmental protection, indigenous people's rights, and the recognition of the role women have played in Philippine history.

In 2000, he was among seven friends who cofounded the Humpback Whale Research and Conservation Project, which eventually became the Philippine advocacy group known as balyena.org.

Saño started painting at the age of 10 and received apprenticeship under painter Fernando Sena. He earned a degree in landscape architecture at the University of the Philippines Diliman and became a wildlife photographer by 2000. He was a Florida-based photographer for the Disney Company in 2007 and resigned in 2010 and did marine research in the Babuyan Islands. After watching The Cove in March 2010, he resigned from his job and began painting murals of dolphins.

Saño has been recognized as one of the Heroes for Peace awardees in the 5th Multiple Intelligence International School Awards, and has been named Arts for Peace Ambassador by the Asia-America Initiative in recognition of his contributions to the Bangsamoro peace process.
