= Mabel (group) =

- Origin: Fucecchio, Italy
- Genres: Italo dance
- Years active: 1999 - 2002
- Website: www.paoloferrali.com

Mabel was Italo dance project, renowned for their singles Disco Disco, Bum Bum and Don't Let Me Down. The group's frontman was Paolo Ferrali. They had reached the top of the sales chart in Italy, France, Germany and Austria.

From 2000 until now the group had performed more than 100 live performance in Italy and many foreign discos and clubs. The group participated in some most prestigious telecast like German telecast Viva Interaktiv, RTL2, GIGA TV etc.

== Discography ==
=== Studio albums ===
- Destination (2002)

The band had the following releases under the same Album Cover, Destination, which had a cover from 1999 to 2002, when the album was considered closed for releases.

DJ Janis VS Plus One, did a remix on the Bum Bum and Don't Let Me Down too.

No.	Title	Lyrics	Length
1.	"Living On My Own (MTJ 10Q Radio)"		3:04
2.	"Disco Disco (Disco Radio Mix)"	Disco Disco IDP	3:46
3.	"Bum Bum (MTJ Extended Radio)"	Bum Bum IDP	3:29
4.	"Don't Let Me Down (Short Radio Edit)"	Don't Let Me Down IDP	3:10
5.	"Land Of Sex (MTJ Platonico Radio)"	Land Of Sex Wikia Lyrics	3:26
6.	"My World (MTJ Radio Mix)"		3:38
7.	"Space (MTJ Hammer Radio)"		3:42
8.	"Come To Light (MTJ Sunlight Radio)"		3:29
9.	"Hey Girl (MTJ Radio Mix)"		4:10
10.	"Final Destination (MTJ Extended Mix)"		4:20
11.	"Bum Bum (MTJ Extended Mix)"		5:41
12.	"Bum Bum (DJ Janis Vs Plus One Remix)"		7:27
13.	"Don't Let Me Down (MTJ Extended Mix)"		5:55
14.	"Don't Let Me Down (DJ Janis Vs Plus One Remix)"		7:32

=== Singles ===
Year	Single	Peak chart positions					Album
Year	Single	AUT	FRA	GER	ITA	SUI	Album
1999	"Disco Disco"	23	24	30	25	75	Destination
2000	"Bum Bum"	2	32	30	17	—	Destination
2000	"Don't Let Me Down"	35	84	57	47	99	Destination
2001	"Land of Sex"	—	—	—	—	—	Destination
2002	"Like a Dream"	—	—	—	—	—	Destination
2002	"Living on My Own"	—	84	—	—	—	Destination
"—" denotes releases that did not chart
