= B.U.M. Equipment =

Clothing brand

- Product type: Clothing brand
- Current owner: BUM Equipment LLC
- Country: Los Angeles, CA
- Introduced: 1986; 40 years ago
- Website: www.bum.com

B.U.M. Equipment is an American clothing brand under the ownership of BUM Equipment LLC. The brand's fashion lines include men's, women's, junior's, and children's sportswear apparel, as well as hosiery, footwear, backpacks, handbags, luggage, and eyewear. According to the LA Times in 1993, B.U.M. Equipment was "one of the most successful young men's sportswear brands in California fashion history."

It is a street fashion clothing company that was founded in 1986 in a Seattle garage. The brand is known for its beginning as a Los Angeles casual sportswear brand for men, women, and children.

The brand had financial troubles in the mid-1990s under the management of the original owner, Chauvin International, Ltd. It went bankrupt in 1996 and was acquired by the creditors of B.U.M. International Inc. and managed by SOS Management in 1997. SOS Management, and its successor B.U.M. Equipment LLC, subsequently relaunched B.U.M. Equipment.

== History ==
=== Origins (1986–1996) ===
Chauvin International, Ltd., a manufacturing company that was led by Morty Forshpan, acquired B.U.M. in 1986. The clothing line made its market debut in 1987 and featured basic clothing items with the brand's logo displayed across their T-shirts, tanks, and sweatshirts. Within its first year, B.U.M. Equipment grossed $2 million and it brought in about $240 million in annual revenues by 1992. In 1992, the B.U.M. parent company, Chauvin International, partnered with the Canadian casual wear company Chip and Pepper. Chauvin International purchased the assets of the Chip and Pepper Wetwear Inc., and distributed its products in the United States while the twin co-founders, Chip and Pepper Foster, were still in charge of overseeing the design along with the marketing and promotion. In 1994 Chauvin International, Ltd. merged with Cami'z, Inc., the B.U.M. brand's retailer.

In April 1996, B.U.M. International filed for Chapter 11 bankruptcy due to what the company said was poor sales. The judge allowed reorganization plan by SOS Management in favor of the B.U.M. International Inc. creditors in 1997. The reorganization, managed by SOS Management and its successor BUM Equipment LLC, resulted in a plan that was in which the B.U.M. International creditors would be paid in full in five years. After the five year payback period, the B.U.M. International Inc. operating unit was dissolved. The trademarks were purchased by BUM Equipment LLC and has continued to operate under that corporate structure.

=== Relaunch and B.U.M. Equipment LLC, (1997–present) ===
SOS Management was established in 1996 by Chairman and chief executive officer Stephen Wayne and Vice Chairman Steve Marra. Wayne was the president of Yves Saint Laurent Sportswear (1974–77), president of the menswear division of Calvin Klein (1977–81), and the president of Sasson Industries for five years prior to launching his own licensing firm, Stephen Wayne & Associates, in 1986. Wayne was the exclusive licensing agent for Sasson, Bugle Boy, Andrew Fezza and Bum Equipment and owns and operates the Stephen Wayne & Associates company. Prior to co-founding SOS Management, Steve Marra worked for Macy's for sixteen years, most recently as vice president of merchandising, and later worked as president of B.U.M. Equipment's retail division and executive vice president of sales and merchandising for the company.

B.U.M. Equipment emerged from bankruptcy in 1997 under the management of SOS Management headed by Wayne and Marra. In 2002, SOS Management purchased the B.U.M. Equipment trademark, establishing the new trademark and licensing company called BUM Equipment LLC. By 2005, B.U.M was operating more than 20 licenses around the world and gathering approximately $600 million annually.

== Brand development ==
B.U.M. Equipment's logo and athletic style were created by Seattle native Derek Federman about a year prior to Morty Forshpan becoming the chief executive officer (CEO) of Chauvin International, Ltd. Shortly after becoming the CEO of Chauvin International, Forshpan found the B.U.M. brand and acquired it. Forshpan pushed the brand into the market in 1987. Brand founder Federman left B.U.M. in 1988 as Forshpan moved the brand's design in a more trendy direction, and following its success and popularity in the late 1980s, Forshpan was nominated twice for the California Mart's West Coast Designer of the Year award. Chauvin International and B.U.M. brand designers insist the acronym "B.U.M." does not stand for anything, though some people believed there could be a hidden message, such as "Basic Urban Merchandise" or "Body Under Maintenance".

Under SOS Management and Bum Equipment LLC, Wayne signed over 35 licenses in 1997 and 1998, which grew the business approximately $2 billion in sales over the next six years. This was accomplished by primarily selling product to Target Stores and many regional retailers like Ames, Caldor, Venture, Meijers, Shopko.

SOS Management began restructuring B.U.M. sportswear in the United States with a license with the Buffalo Group in 2005. The company also signed licensees in Malaysia, Taiwan, England, Korea, Germany, Mexico, Argentina and Brazil. The B.U.M. brand was extended to non-apparel licenses in footwear, socks, sunglasses, and licenses in watches, luggage and eyewear were renewed. B.U.M. Equipment signed licenses with New York-based Channel Creations in 2007 for their men's and women's sportswear. In 2009, the company relaunched their young men's and juniors brands in department stores through a license with Sierra Fashions.

In 2004, Women's Wear Daily listed B.U.M. Equipment as Number 5 on their "Top 10 Young Contemporary Hip List in 2004."

== Popular culture ==
Billy Ray Cyrus wore B.U.M. Equipment workout tanks during his concerts on his 1992 tour and was pictured in the 1991 October issue of Cosmopolitan wearing a tank from the brand.

Jane Fonda wore a B.U.M. Equipment shirt in her 1992 workout video.

Christian Slater can be seen sporting a B.U.M. Equipment shirt in the movie Pump Up The Volume.

== Sponsorship ==
As a sportswear and casual athletic fashion brand, B.U.M. has sponsored various athletes including Laila Ali and Oscar De La Hoya. It was also the official off-the-rink casual wear of the Los Angeles Kings. B.U.M. Equipment also outfitted caddies for PGA Tour events beginning in 1998.

In 2012 B.U.M. Equipment participated with the Dancing with the Stars gifting suite for its 14th Season. Contestants from the show were able to choose items of the B.U.M. Equipment brand to wear during show rehearsals.
