= Marissa Sanchez (comedian) =

Filipino comedian and actress

- Born: Late 1970 (age 55)
- Spouse(s): Mr. Singson (m. 1998; ann. 2001) Ian Nava (m. 2004; sep. 2013)
- Children: 1 (with Nava)

Comedy career
- Years active: 1980s–present
- Genres: Sitcom; Self-deprecation

Marissa Sanchez (born late 1970) is a Filipino comedian, musician, and actress. She first became known as a performer at the Calesa Bar from 1995 to 1999 where she sang and hosted comedy shows. After leaving the bar in 1999 she went on to become a solo performer having also appeared in television.

== Early life ==
Marissa Sanchez was born in late 1970 and is a product of rape. Her mother went on to marry another man giving birth to Marissa's five younger siblings. Hailing from Isabela, she admitted to having a difficult childhood and with the family moving frequently to avoid Marissa's father.

She was a "big girl" as a child having auditioned for Kaluskos Musmos in the mid-1970s but had to quit due to health issues.

== Career ==
=== Early years ===
Sanchez started her career at age 11 singing at clubs, cabarets and bars in Metro Manila. She was first part of the Verling Villapando Orchestra at Bodega City.

Sanchez was a ballerina who did shows for the Cultural Center of the Philippines and Philippine Women's University. Her mother convinced her to commit to singing and was the younger Sanchez's mentor.

While continuing to sing in venues such as the Manila Bay Club and Hotel Mirador, Sanchez continued to dance and also did theatre acting portraying a prostitute in Repertory Philippines' adaptation of Evita. An accident in 1987 ended her dancing career as she started to gain weight. Her frame causes her to receive less gigs in singing.

Attending a show at the Strumm's, she met fellow entertainer Robert Em. It was Em, who is similarly overweight, who convinced Sanchez to use on her fatness to her advantage.

She would have a big break as a comedian in 1993 at the Music Room of the Manila Pavilion.

=== Calesa Bar (1995–1999) ===
Sanchez in the early 1990s as a singer singing abroad.

She tried to get into a venue at home in the Philippines. She was rejected in her first audition at the Calesa Bar at the Hyatt Regency Manila by musical director Rudy Francisco with Sanchez remarking how they needed who is "sultry but sang off-key". She was also reportedly rejected for being overweight. She was accepted in the second audition by Francisco by singing "Evergreen" by Barbra Streisand.

Sanchez struggled in her first year at Calesa Bar in 1995, failing to draw sufficient crowds. She started incorporating comedy to her performance which led to her hosting comedy nights when the bar decided to put up themed events. Promotion by Manila Standard editor and television host Jullie Yap Daza became a regular and helped promote her shows. She left Calesa in 1999.

=== Solo performer and acting career ===
After leaving Calesa, Sanchez went on to do her own performances both locally and abroad and also did appearances in television and films.

Sanchez signed a contract with ABS-CBN Network in 1999 to appear in the sitcom Pwedeng Pwede with Robin Padilla and Redford White which ran until late 2001 as well as in ASAP. She also guested at Magandang Tanghali Bayan.

In 2001, Sanchez as part of Viva Records released her first album "Magbati na Tayo" which featured various novelty songs. In 2003, Sanchez made effort to be more "serious" in her performance taking inspiration from Janno Gibbs and Ogie Alcasid still incorporating comedy.

Sanchez joined Viva Entertainment in 2019.

She held her last concert in December 2023, intending to focus on her acting career.

== Comedy style ==
Sanchez is noted for her self-deprecating humor and has used her large frame as part of her comedy work as encouraged by fellow comedian Robert Em. Em also taught Sanchez that communication to one's audience is essential in comedy.

In the early 2000s, Sanchez was reportedly cultivating a "funny diva" persona. She claims to not "study" comedy and her humor relies on the situational but avoids current events.

Her jokes used to be vulgar and "green" but by 2023 has steered away from that style of comedy.

== Personal life ==
Outside the context of being comedian, Sanchez describes herself as a very serious person who was initially skeptical of her ability to make people laugh. She was also diagnosed with diabetes in 2002 and has admitted dealing with insecurities regarding her weight despite using it as a subject matter in her jokes.

Sanchez had two marriages. Her first marriage was with Pangasinan-based businessman Mr. Singson which began in 1998 lasted for just a year. However her first marriage was only annulled in 2001 when she proved that her first husband was already married to another woman.

She met her second husband, Ian Nava while doing a show in Sweden. Their relationship which produced a daughter, lasted from December 2004 to October 2013, when they separated. Their marriage remains legally valid as of 2020.

By 2020, Sanchez professed to be content living as a single woman.
