= Metro Manila Film Festival Award for Best Original Theme Song =

Film theme song award

- Awarded for: Best Original Song composed by songwriter(s)
- Country: Philippines
- Presented by: MMDA
- First award: 1989
- Currently held by: "Sandalan" – Vehnee Saturno, Manila's Finest (2025)
- Website: www.mmda.gov.ph/mmff/

The Metro Manila Film Festival Award for Best Original Theme Song is an award presented annually by the Metropolitan Manila Development Authority (MMDA). It was first awarded at the 15th Metro Manila Film Festival ceremony, held in 1989; George Canseco won the award for his song composition in Imortal and it is given to a songwriters who have composed the best original song written specifically for a motion picture. Currently, nominees and winners are determined by Executive Committees, headed by the Metropolitan Manila Development Authority Chairman and key members of the film industry.

== Winners and nominees ==
=== 1980s ===
Year	Film	Songwriter(s)	Ref
1989 (15th)	Imortal	George Canseco	

=== 1990s ===
Year	Film	Songwriter(s)	Ref
1990 (16th)	Andrea, Paano Ba ang Maging Isang Ina?	Mon Faustino	
1991 (17th)	Ang Totoong Buhay ni Pacita M.	Lucio San Pedro	
1992 (18th)	Bakit Labis Kitang Mahal	Alex Mallillin ("Bakit Labis Kitang Mahal")	
1993 (19th)	Kung Mawawala Ka Pa		
1994 (20th)	Lucas Abelardo	Rey Magtoto	
1995 (21st)	Muling Umawit ang Puso		
1996 (22nd)	Magic Temple	Archie Castillo	
1997 (23rd)	Babae		
1998 (24th)	José Rizal	Nonong Buencamino ("Awit ni Maria Clara")	
1999 (25th)	Bulaklak ng Maynila	Vehnee Saturno ("Anong Daling Sabihin")	

=== 2000s ===
Year	Film	Songwriter(s)	Ref
2000 (26th)	-	-	
2001 (27th)	Bagong Buwan	Joey Ayala ("Walang Hanggang Paalam")	
2002 (28th)	Home Alone Da Riber	("Nasaan Ka Man")	
2003 (29th)	Homecoming	Ato del Rosario and Nilo Alcala ("Isang Pagtanaw")	
2004 (30th)	Mano Po III: My Love	Karylle & John Jerome Hughes (Pabigyan Ng Puso)	
2005 (31st)	Kutob	Thor ("Kasalanan Nga Ba?")	
2006 (32nd)	Kasal, Kasali, Kasalo	Yeng Constantino ("Hawak Kamay")	
2007 (33rd)	Anak ng Kumander	Rusty Fernandez ("Wala Na Bang Pag-Asa?")	
2008 (34th)	Dayo: Sa Mundo ng Elementalia	Jessie Lazatin and Artemio Abad Jr. ("Lipad" - performed by Lea Salonga)	
2009 (35th)	Ang Panday	Ogie Alcasid ("Tanging Ikaw Lamang" - performed by Regine Velasquez)	

=== 2010s ===
Year	Film	Songwriter(s)	Ref
2010 (36th)	RPG Metanoia	Ria Osorio and Gerard Salonga - "Kaya Mo" - performed by Protein Shake ft. Ney and Kean Cipriano)	
2011 (37th)	Manila Kingpin: The Asiong Salonga Story	("La Paloma" - performed by Ely Buendia)	
2012 (38th)	El Presidente	Apl.de.ap and Jamir Garcia	
2013 (39th)	My Little Bossings	Jan K. Ilacad	
2014 (40th)	Bonifacio: Ang Unang Pangulo	"Hindi Pa Tapos" - Gloc-9 feat. Denise Barbacena	
2015 (41st)	Honor Thy Father	"Tao"	
2015 (41st)	All You Need Is Pag-Ibig	"All You Need Is Pag-Ibig"	
2015 (41st)	Nilalang	"Greyhoundz Lions"	
2016 (42nd)	Seklusyon	"Dominus Miserere" - Francis De Veyra	
2017 (43rd)	Siargao	"Alon" - Hale	
2017 (43rd)	Deadma Walking	"Biyaheng Langit" - Eric Cabahug	
2017 (43rd)	All of You	"Natapos Tayo" - Nar Cabico	
2018 (44th)	Rainbow's Sunset	"Sa'yo Na" - Ice Seguerra	
2018 (44th)	Mary, Marry Me	"Sissums" - Alex Gonzaga and Toni Gonzaga	
2018 (44th)	One Great Love (film)	"Dating Tayo" - TJ Monterde	
2019 (45th)	Write About Love	"Ikaw ang Akin" - Crisanto B. Aquino	
2019 (45th)	Mindanao	"Itadyak" - Maan Chua	
2019 (45th)	Sunod	"Inay" - Mariah Moriones	

=== 2020s ===
Year	Film	Songwriter(s)	Ref
2020 (46th)	The Boy Foretold by the Stars	"Ulan" - Jhay Cura and Pau Protacio	
2020 (46th)	Coming Home	"Ganyan ang Pag-ibig ko" - Lito Camo	
2020 (46th)	Suarez: The Healing Priest	"Yakapin Mo Ako" - Joven Tan	
2020 (46th)	Isa Pang Bahaghari	"Hanggang Muli" - Emerson Texon	
2020 (46th)	Magikland	"Smile" - Emerson Texon	
2021 (47th)	Huling Ulan sa Tag-Araw	"Umulan Man O Umaraw" - Louie Ignacio	
2021 (47th)	Huwag Kang Lalabas	"Huwag Kang Lalabas" - Bryan Lao	
2021 (47th)	Love at First Stream	"No Stopping You" - SB19	
2021 (47th)	Nelia	"Sa Susunod na Ikot ng Mundo" - Kris Lawrence	
2022 (48th)	Mamasapano: Now It Can Be Told	"Aking Mahal" - Ferdinand Topacio and Cristy Fermin	
2022 (48th)	Labyu with an Accent		
2022 (48th)	Family Matters		
2022 (48th)	My Teacher	"Sandal Ka Lang" - Cesar Francis Concio	
2023 (49th)	Becky and Badette	"Finggah Lickin" - Eugene Domingo	
2023 (49th)	GomBurZa	"Sa Duyan Ng Bayan" – Ebe Dancel, Gloc 9 and Noel Cabangon	
2023 (49th)	Family of Two	"Sa Yakap Mo" – Iyah Ladip-Guanzon and Ralph Padiernos	
2023 (49th)	Kampon	"O Paru Paro"	
2023 (49th)	Penduko	"Dagundong" – Alamat	
2023 (49th)	Mallari	'"Pag-ibig sa Sumpa" – Juan Karlos	
2024 (50th)	Isang Himala	"Ang Himala ay Nasa Puso" – Juan Karlos Labajo	
2024 (50th)	The Kingdom	"Magkabilaan" – Zephanie Dimaranan and Apoc	
2024 (50th)	Topakk	"Darkness Calls" – Basti Artadi	
2024 (50th)	Uninvited	"Hahamakin ang Lahat" – KZ Tandingan and Arthur Nery	
2025 (51st)	Manila's Finest	"Sandalan" – Vehnee Saturno	
2025 (51st)	Rekonek	"Bagong Simula" – Sabine Serrado	
2025 (51st)	Rekonek	"Pahinga" – Sabine Serrado	
2025 (51st)	Rekonek	"Patungo" – Sabine Serrado	
2025 (51st)	Shake, Rattle & Roll Evil Origins	"Balak sa Dilim" – Mikhail Ali Hooshmand	
2025 (51st)	Shake, Rattle & Roll Evil Origins	"Dugo" – Paulo Almaden	
