= Zeinab Harake =

Social media personality (born 1998)

- Philippine passport photo, 2026
- Born: Zeinab Mohammad Ocampo Harake; December 11, 1998 (age 27); Bacoor, Cavite, Philippines
- Education: St. Peregrine Institute
- Occupation: Model; YouTuber; Actress
- Years active: 2019–present
- Spouse: Bobby Ray Parks Jr. (m. 2025)
- Children: 2

YouTube information
- Channel: Zeinab Harake
- Subscribers: 15.5 million
- Views: 1.25 billion
- Last updated: July 14, 2026

Zeinab Mohammad Ocampo Harake-Parks (born December 11, 1998) is a Filipino-Lebanese YouTuber and actress.

== Early life and education ==
Zeinab Mohammad Ocampo Harake was born on December 11, 1998, in Bacoor, Cavite, Philippines, to a Lebanese father and a Filipino mother. She has three siblings: Tara (who died in 2015), Wessam, and the youngest, Rana, who is also a YouTuber. She graduated from high school in Manila and later pursued an associate degree in fashion design.

Before becoming a full-time YouTuber, she participated in beauty pageants, modeled, and worked as a Disney Princess at mall events. She was named Binibining Kalikasan at her school in 2016, represented the Philippines in a makeup competition, and worked as a model in Singapore in 2018. In 2019, she competed in Binibining Parañaque (lit. 'Miss Parañaque'), where she placed third runner-up.

Harake launched her YouTube channel in 2019, reaching six million subscribers in its first year. As of 2025, her channel has 14.8 million subscribers.

She made her feature film debut in the 2023 Metro Manila Film Festival horror entry Kampon, starring alongside Derek Ramsay and Beauty Gonzalez.

== Personal life ==
At the age of 18, Harake adopted a days-old baby boy and named him Lucas in 2017. On April 28, 2021, she gave birth to her first biological child named Bia with her then-boyfriend, rapper Skusta Clee. On April 13, 2022, Harake revealed the loss of their second son.

Harake married Filipino-American basketball player Bobby Ray Parks Jr. on June 1, 2025 (2nd Anniversary), in a ceremony in Tagaytay City, attended by notable guests including Paul Soriano, Toni Gonzaga, Alex Gonzaga, Loisa Andalio, Yassi Pressman, Andrea Brillantes, and Awra Briguela.

In November 2026, Harake revealed the finalization of the legal adoption of both her children, Bia & Lucas by her husband, Bobby Ray Parks. Her children now bear the surname, Parks.

== Filmography ==
=== Film ===
Year	Title	Role	Notes	Ref.
2023	Kampon	Loretta Bitangcol	2023 Metro Manila Film Festival entry	
