= Firefly (2023 film) =

- Theatrical release poster
- Directed by: Zig Dulay
- Written by: Angeli Atienza
- Produced by: Nessa Valdellon; Annette Gozon-Valdes; Angeli Atienza; Kristian Julao
- Starring: Alessandra De Rossi; Euwenn Mikaell
- Cinematography: Neil Daza
- Edited by: Benjo Ferrer
- Music by: Len Calvo
- Production companies: GMA Pictures; GMA Public Affairs
- Distributed by: GMA Pictures
- Release date: December 25, 2023 (MMFF)
- Running time: 103 minutes
- Country: Philippines
- Languages: Filipino; Bicolano

Firefly is a 2023 Philippine fantasy film written by Angeli Atienza and directed by Zig Dulay. The film stars Alessandra De Rossi and Euwenn Mikaell in his theatrical debut. It was one of the entries in the 2023 Metro Manila Film Festival, where it won as Best Picture.

== Premise ==
Set in 1999, Firefly is told from the perspective of an adult Tonton (Dingdong Dantes) who reminisces about his childhood.

A ten-year old Tonton (Euwenn Mikaell) goes on a search for the "Island of Fireflies", a mystical island of Ticao he learned from Elay, his mother (Alessandra De Rossi) during bedtime stories.

== Cast ==
- Alessandra De Rossi as Mariela "Elay" Alvaro, Tonton's kind and late mother who introduced him the fireflies
- Euwenn Mikaell as Anthony "Tonton" Alvaro, a child who learns about a mystical island of fireflies
  - Dingdong Dantes as adult Tonton Role is billed as a special participation.
- Yayo Aguila as Carmen, a kind woman who joins the young Tonton in his journey.
  - Racquel Villavicencio as old Carmen
- Epy Quizon as Louie, husband of Carmen who also joins Tonton in his journey.
  - Jaime Fabregas as old Louie
- Cherry Pie Picache as Linda Alvaro, Tonton's protective aunt.
  - Lui Manansala as Old Linda
- Miguel Tanfelix as Billy, who also joined Tonton in his journey
  - Gary Estrada as adult Billy
- Ysabel Ortega as Erika, who also joined Tonton in his journey
  - Bernadette Allyson-Estrada as adult Erika
- Kokoy de Santos as Romnick, son of Carmen and Louie
- Max Collins as Abby, a reporter covering Firefly who interviews Tonton at the National Children Book Awards
- Juancho Trivino as Tonton's Father
- Elle Villanueva as Magayon, the fairy Elay described in her map
- Marco Masa as Billy and Erika's son

== Production ==
Firefly is a film by GMA Network produced under GMA Pictures and the GMA Public Affairs. Zig Dulay was the director, while Neil Daza served as the cinematographer. Angeli Atienza was the writer. Firefly is the first fictional feature film production of GMA Public Affairs, which is better known for producing documentaries. Glaiza de Castro and child star Raphael Landicho were originally cast as the lead roles before de Rossi and Mikaell took over their respective roles.

Principal photography was finished by August 2023, with Metro Manila and Bicol serving as filming locations.

== Release ==
Firefly premiered in cinemas in the Philippines on December 25, 2023, as one of the official entries of the 2023 Metro Manila Film Festival.

Viva Films distributed Firefly in the United Arab Emirates (Al Ghurair Centre, Dubai, Abu Dhabi, Ajman and Al Ain) beginning January 17.

The film was an entry to the Metro Manila International Film Festival in TCL Chinese 6 theaters and Directors Guild of America Complex, Los Angeles, which took place from January 30 to February 2.

In the Manila International Film Festival on February 3, 2024, in Hollywood, California, Firefly captured four awards: Best Picture, Best Supporting Actress for Alessandra de Rossi, Best Screenplay for Angeli Atienza, and Best Director for Dulay. The Firefly team has an opportunity to create a US-based feature film co-produced by Birns & Sawyer with up to $100,000 worth of camera rental equipment. Its director Dulay, and screenwriter will each receive the latest version of Final Draft software, valued at $250.

The film screened at Beijing International Film Festival (BJIFF) on April 18 until April 26, 2024.

In April 2024, GMA Public Affairs announced the launching of a storybook that was based on the film. Written by Augie Rivera, the scriptwriter, the storybook's illustrations were drawn by Aldy Aguirre, with watercolor and gouache.

== Accolades ==
Accolades received by Firefly
Award	Date of ceremony	Category	Recipient(s)	Result	Ref.
2023 Metro Manila Film Festival	December 27, 2023	Best Picture	Firefly	Won	
2023 Metro Manila Film Festival	December 27, 2023	Best Director	Zig Dulay	Nominated	
2023 Metro Manila Film Festival	December 27, 2023	Best Supporting Actor	Dingdong Dantes	Nominated	
2023 Metro Manila Film Festival	December 27, 2023	Best Supporting Actor	Epi Quizon	Nominated	
2023 Metro Manila Film Festival	December 27, 2023	Best Supporting Actress	Alessandra de Rossi	Nominated	
2023 Metro Manila Film Festival	December 27, 2023	Best Screenplay	Angeli Atienza	Won	
2023 Metro Manila Film Festival	December 27, 2023	Best Cinematography	Neil Daza	Nominated	
2023 Metro Manila Film Festival	December 27, 2023	Best Production Design	Kenneth Villanueva	Nominated	
2023 Metro Manila Film Festival	December 27, 2023	Best Child Performer	Euwenn Mikaell	Won	
2023 Metro Manila Film Festival	December 27, 2023	Gender Sensitivity Award	Firefly	Nominated	
Platinum Stallion National Media Awards	February 2024	Director of the Year	Zig Dulay	Won	
Platinum Stallion National Media Awards	February 2024	Child Star of the Year	Euwenn Mikaell	Won	
2024 Manila International Film Festival	February 2, 2024	Best Picture	Firefly	Won	
2024 Manila International Film Festival	February 2, 2024	Best Director	Zig Dulay	Won	
2024 Manila International Film Festival	February 2, 2024	Best Supporting Actress	Alessandra de Rossi	Won	
2024 Manila International Film Festival	February 2, 2024	Best Screenplay	Angeli Atienza	Won	
Box Office Entertainment Awards	May 12, 2024	Movie Supporting Actress of the Year	Alessandra De Rossi	Won	
Box Office Entertainment Awards	May 12, 2024	Most Popular Child Performer of the Year	Euwenn Mikaell	Won	
40th PMPC Star Awards for Movies	July 21, 2024	New Movie Actress of the Year	Ysabel Ortega	Won	
40th PMPC Star Awards for Movies	July 21, 2024	New Cinematographer of the Year	Neil Daza	Won	
40th PMPC Star Awards for Movies	July 21, 2024	Movie Child Performer of the Year	Euwenn Mikaell	Won	
ContentAsia Awards	September 5, 2024	Best Asian Feature Film (silver award)	Firefly	Won	
