= When I Met You in Tokyo =

2023 Philippine romantic comedy-drama film

When I Met You In Tokyo
- Theatrical release poster
- Directed by: Rado Peru; Rommel Penesa
- Screenplay by: Suzette Doctolero
- Story by: Rado Peru; Christopher de Leon; Vilma Santos
- Produced by: Redgie A. Magno
- Starring: Vilma Santos; Christopher de Leon
- Cinematography: Shayne Sarte
- Edited by: Froilan Francia
- Music by: Jessie Lasaten
- Production company: JG Productions
- Distributed by: Rafaella Films International
- Release date: December 25, 2023
- Running time: 123 minutes
- Country: Philippines
- Language: Filipino

When I Met You In Tokyo (Japanese: 東京で会ったとき, Hepburn: Tōkyō de atta toki) is a 2023 Philippine romantic comedy drama film written by Suzette Doctolero and directed by Rado Peru and Rommel Penesa. It stars Vilma Santos and Christopher de Leon, both of whom were teamed up in several blockbuster films such as Tag-ulan sa Tag-Araw (1975), Sinasamba Kita (1982), Minsan Pa Nating Hagkan ang Nakaraan (1983), Imortal (1989), Dekada '70 (2002), and Mano Po III: My Love (2004).

It was released on December 25, 2023, as an official entry for the 49th Metro Manila Film Festival.

== Plot ==
In Japan, Azon and her friends work as servants at a hotel in Tokyo, while Joey is a farmer working on a rural farm with his friend Akira and a man recently annulled from his marriage. Azon meets Joey at a bar during a party with her friends, and they are scolded by Joey for being rowdy. Afterwards, a drunk Azon punches him in the face, and her friends drag her away. Later, Azon and Joey meet again when she buys vegetables from him, and they recognize each other from the bar the previous night. After several more encounters, Azon and Joey forgive each other for their misunderstandings and start going out together with their friends.

Azon learns that her brother Marlon is a gambling addict after his daughter Hannah secretly contacts her and says that had squandered her remittances. This leads Azon to stop giving him money. Marlon, deduces that Hannah ratted him out and slaps her for being a "traitor." After several months, he apologizes to Azon, promising to change after visiting their parents' graves. Meanwhile, Joey is close to his daughter Charlene but has a strained relationship with his ex-wife Susan. With Akira's advice about forgiveness, Joey decides to forgive Susan and move on from their past mistakes. Azon and Joey gradually develop a romantic relationship, while in the Philippines, Hannah becomes close friends with Joey's grandson Jomar.

Azon and Joey eventually get married and move to Joey's home, enjoying a loving relationship. However, due to their age, they are unable to consummate their love on their honeymoon. Their marriage lasts six years, but Azon develops osteoarthritis in her leg, creating challenges for Joey, who secretly suffers from heart problems that only he and Charlene know about. Azon becomes angry when she learns that Joey kept his illness a secret from her, but eventually forgives him and resolve to make the most of their time together.

After taking a walk in the snowy mountains, Azon and Joey rest at home. While Azon goes to get water, Joey suffers a heart attack. She returns to find him collapsed, and he tells her he loves her before dying. Both Akira and Azon are devastated by Joey's death. Azon informs Charlene, who is also deeply saddened. Afterward, Azon reflects on the valuable lessons Joey taught her, including gardening, farming, and how to cut a bonsai tree, which taught her patience. The film ends with Azon narrating about finding one's soulmate and how they are meant to be together.

== Cast ==
=== Lead Cast ===
- Vilma Santos as Azon, a feisty and bubbly woman. Santos who is returning to acting in feature film after working in the 2016 film Everything About Her, accepted the project upon learning that de Leon would be her on-screen partner. Their last film appearance together was in the 2004 film, Mano Po III: My Love
- Christopher de Leon as Joey, a farmer who is still reeling from the aftermath of a divorce with his unfaithful ex-wife. Director Conrado Peru requested de Leon to be also an associate director and to help the production staff work with Santos.

=== Supporting Cast ===
- Cassy Legaspi as Hannah
- Darren Espanto as Jomar
- Lotlot De Leon as Charlene
- Gabby Eigenmann as Marlon
- Kouki Taguchi as Tekeru
- Gina Alajar as Susan
- Tirso Cruz III as Edwin
- Kakai Bautista as Sonia
- Lynn Cruz as Anita
- Jacky Woo as Akira
- John Gabriel as Drew

== Production ==
When I Met You In Tokyo was produced under JG Productions and was directed by Rado Peru and Rommel Penesa. Suzette Doctolero was the scriptwriter while Shayne Sarte was the cinematographer.

The film is about two older Overseas Filipino Workers in Japan. Around 95 percent of the principal photography took place in Japan, with most of the film's story taking place in the countryside. Filming in Japan started around April 2023.

== Release ==
When I Met You In Tokyo premiered in cinemas in the Philippines on December 25, 2023, as one of the official entries of the 2023 Metro Manila Film Festival. The film was originally scheduled to be released sometime around September 2023, but JG Productions decided to postpone the release date due to the rainy season.

== Reception ==
=== Critical reception ===
The film received a generally positive reception from several notable reviewers according to review aggregator website Kritikultura. It garnered a score of 63/100 based on 16 reviews.

Several critics noted De Leon and Santos's performance as the film's biggest strength. Joseph L. Garcia of BusinessWorld wrote, "By all standards, the film should have been predictable and unexciting. In the hands of Mr. De Leon, and especially Ms. Santos, the film reaches a higher standard." Goldwin Reviews echoed this sentiment, stating, "Mahirap hindi kiligin sa pinaggagawa nina Vilma Santos at Christopher de Leon dito. Ang saya nilang panuorin."

=== Accolades ===
Accolades received by When I Met You in Tokyo
Year	Award	Category	Recipient(s)	Result	Ref.
2023	Metro Manila Film Festival	Best Picture	When I Met You in Tokyo	4th Best Picture	
2023	Metro Manila Film Festival	Best Director	Rado Peru & Rommel Peneza	Nominated	
2023	Metro Manila Film Festival	Best Actor	Christopher de Leon	Nominated	
2023	Metro Manila Film Festival	Best Actress	Vilma Santos-Recto	Won	
2023	Metro Manila Film Festival	Best Screenplay	Suzette Doctolero	Nominated	
2023	Metro Manila Film Festival	Best Cinematography	Shayne Sarte	Nominated	
2023	Metro Manila Film Festival	Fernando Poe Jr. Memorial Award for Excellence	When I Met You In Tokyo	Won	
2023	Metro Manila Film Festival	Best Float	When I Met You In Tokyo	Won	
2023	Metro Manila Film Festival	Gender Sensitivity Award	When I Met You In Tokyo	Nominated	
2024	Manila International Film Festival	Best Actress	Vilma Santos	Won	
2024	2024 FAMAS Awards	Circle of Excellence	Vilma Santos	Won	
2024	7th Eddy's	Best Actress	Vilma Santos	Nominated	
2024	7th Eddy's	Best Cinematography	Shayne Sarte	Nominated	
2024	7th Eddy's	Best Production Design	When I Met You in Tokyo	Nominated	
2024	7th Eddy's	Best Sound	When I Met You in Tokyo	Nominated	
2024	40th PMPC Star Awards for Movies	Star Award for Movie Actress of the Year	Vilma Santos	Won	

== Gallery ==
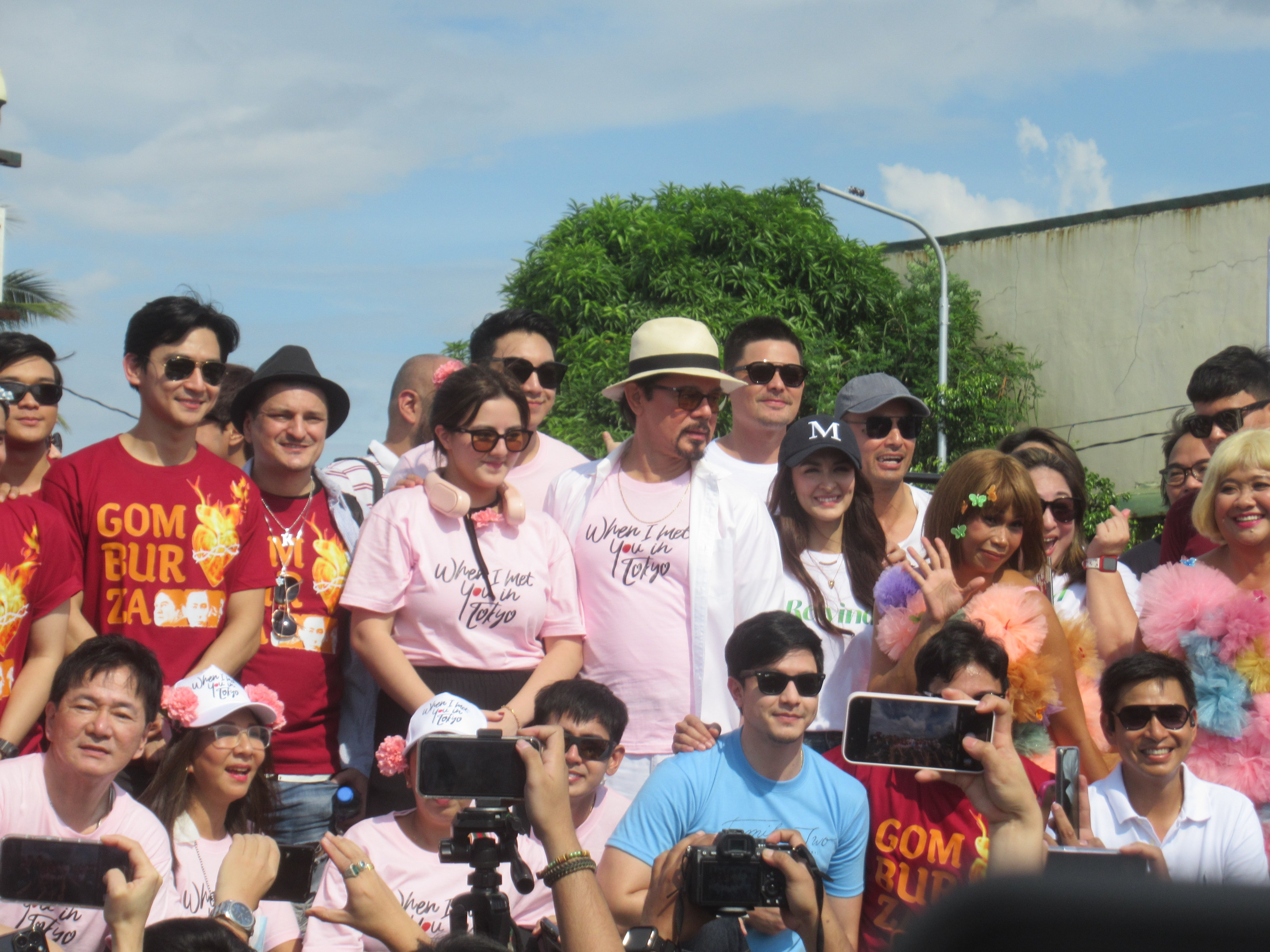
Casts in Parade of Stars

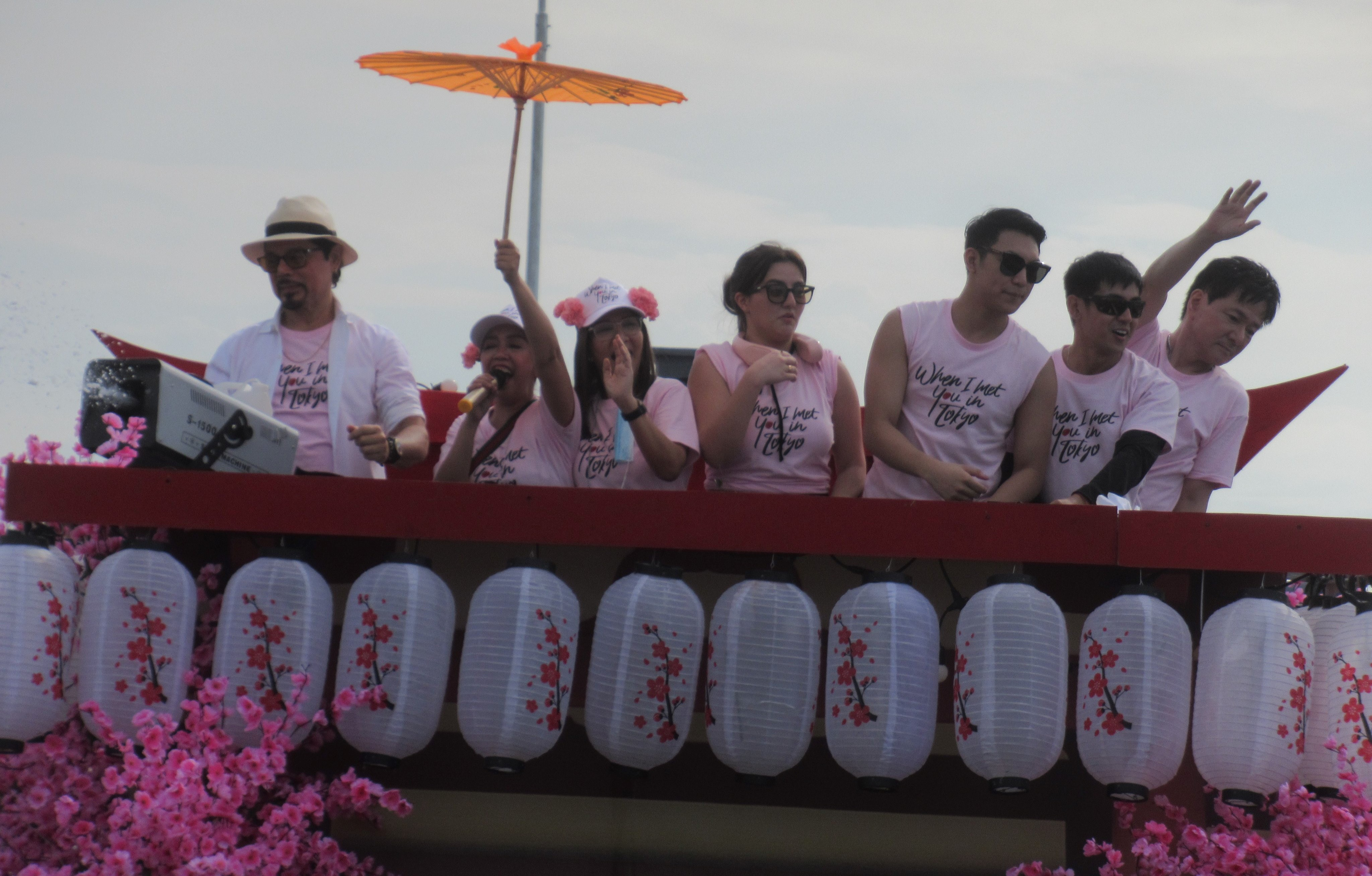
Float Parade of Stars
