= Tommy Alejandrino =

Filipino actor (born 2001)

- Born: Tomas Alejandrino Santos; August 24, 2001 (age 24)
- Other name: Tomas Santos
- Occupation: Actor
- Years active: 2017–present
- Relatives: Kate Alejandrino (sister)

Tomas Alejandrino Santos (Tagalog: [ˈtɑːmi ˌæləhænˈdɹiːnoʊ sˈæntoʊs]; born August 24, 2001), known professionally as Tommy Alejandrino and occasionally credited as Tomas Santos, is a Filipino actor best known for his portrayal of Amir in the critically acclaimed film The Baseball Player (2022). His performance earned him a Best Actor award at the Cinemalaya Philippine Independent Film Festival along with several other nominations.

Alejandrino is recognized for his work in independent cinema, where he often takes on complex and socially relevant roles.

== Early life and education ==
Tomas Alejandrino Santos is the youngest of six siblings. He studied theater at the Philippine High School for the Arts (PHSA), where he trained for six years in acting, directing, and dramaturgy. The school, located on the slopes of Mount Makiling in Laguna, was where he followed a vegan lifestyle for a year. It was during his time at PHSA that he was discovered and offered an audition for the lead role of Amir in The Baseball Player.

His sister is actress Kate Alejandrino.

== Career ==
In 2022, Alejandrino portrayed Moro child soldier Amir in The Baseball Player, for which he won Best Actor at the 18th Cinemalaya Independent Film Festival "for his poignant and engaging portrayal of a boy coming of age amid the havoc of war", according to the festival's citation for Best Performance of an Actor in a full-length feature. He was also nominated for Best Actor at the 46th Gawad Urian Awards, as well as New Movie Actor of the Year in the 39th PMPC Star Awards for Movies.

In 2023, Alejandrino received a Best Actor nomination for The Baseball Player at the ASEAN International Film Festival and Awards, and was subsequently selected as one of the Philippine delegates to the biennial festival. He also appeared in the horror film Mallari, portraying the character Didi, a sex worker. His performance earned him a nomination for Best Supporting Actor at the 2023 Metro Manila Film Festival. He won the Movie Ensemble Acting of the Year award at the 40th PMPC Star Awards for Movies, alongside fellow Mallari cast members Piolo Pascual, JC Santos, Janella Salvador, Gloria Diaz, Raffy Tejada, Angeli Nicole Sanoy, and Elisse Joson. He was also featured in the Metro Manila Film Festival entry GomBurZa as Felipe Buencamino. The same year, Alejandrino was cast as Kenjie Juan in the teen mystery television series Senior High. His performance later earned him a nomination at the 37th PMPC Star Awards for Television. In 2024, he reprised his role in the sequel series, High Street.

Alejandrino also played the supporting role of houseboy Marlon in the 2024 surrealist indie film Salome. He later secured the role of Dave in the 2025 indie film Her Locket, which was also premiered at the San Diego Filipino Film Festival. For his performances as Marlon and Dave, Alejandrino received nominations at the 6th Sinag Maynila Film Festival for Best Supporting Actor.

== Filmography ==
Key
†	Denotes films that have not yet been released

=== Film ===
Year	Title	Role	Notes	Ref.
2017	Angelito	Angel Bernal	Short film; credited as Tomas Santos	
2018	Goyo: Ang Batang Heneral	Angel Bernal	Credited as Tomas Santos	
2021	Henry	Danilo	Short film	
2022	The Baseball Player	Amir	18th Cinemalaya Independent Film Festival entry	
2022	Finding Daddy Blake	Kokoy		
2023	Pieta	Jonil		
2023	GomBurZa	Felipe Buencamino	49th Metro Manila Film Festival entry	
2023	Mallari	Didi Laan	49th Metro Manila Film Festival entry	
2024	One Day League: Dead Mother, Dead All	Hans	1st Puregold CinePanalo Film Festival entry	
2024	Pretty Boys	Grey		
2024	Salome	Marlon	6th Sinag Maynila Film Festival entry	
2024	Some Nights I Feel Like Walking	Rush	28th Tallinn Black Nights Film Festival entry	
2025	Her Locket	Dave	6th Sinag Maynila Film Festival entry	
2025	Song of the Fireflies	Timmy	Manila International Film Festival entry	
2025	Lasting Moments	Rekrek		
TBA	The Sacrifice †	TBA	Post-production	

=== Television ===
Year	Title	Role	Notes	Ref.
2023	The Day I Loved You	Nikko	Main Role	
2023	Regal Studio Presents: Revenge Girls	Nato	Main Role; Season 9, Episode 8	
2023-2024	Senior High	Kenjie Juan	Supporting Cast	
2024	High Street	Kenjie Juan	Main Role (Ensemble Cast)	
2024	Marahuyo Project	Jose	Episode 1	
2025	Ang Himala ni Niño	Ronnie	Recurring Role; Episode 78-84	
2025	Maalaala Mo Kaya	Eugene dela Cruz	Episode 12 (Pinto)	
2026	The Silent Noise	Kyle		

=== Theater ===
Year	Production	Role	Location	Ref.
2022	Nay, May Dala Akong Pancit	Tindero/Various Roles (Note: Alejandrino appears in multiple roles that serve the same recurring function within this production.)	CCP Experimental Theater	
2026	Yemeya	Jesus/Mulo (Note: Shared the title role with Benedix Ramos.)	The Black Box, Proscenium Theater	

== Accolades ==
Awards and nominations
Award	Year	Category	Nominated work	Result	Ref.
Asean International Film Festival and Awards	2023	Best Actor	The Baseball Player	Nominated	
Cinemalaya Independent Film Festival	2022	Best Actor	The Baseball Player	Won	
Gawad Urian Award	2023	Best Actor	The Baseball Player	Nominated	
Metro Manila Film Festival	2023	Best Supporting Actor	Mallari	Nominated	
PMPC Star Awards for Movies	2024	New Movie Actor of the Year	The Baseball Player	Nominated	
PMPC Star Awards for Movies	2024	Movie Ensemble Acting of the Year (Note: Shared with the cast of Mallari.)	Mallari	Won	
PMPC Star Awards for Movies	2025	Indie Movie Ensemble Acting of the Year (Note: Shared with the cast of Her Locket.)	Her Locket	Won	
PMPC Star Awards for Television	2025	Best New Male TV Personality	Senior High	Nominated	
Sinag Maynila Film Festival	2024	Best Supporting Actor	Salome	Nominated	
Sinag Maynila Film Festival	2024	Best Supporting Actor	Her Locket	Nominated	
VP Choice Awards	2024	BL Loveteam of the Year	The Day I Loved You	Nominated	
