= Family of Two =

- Theatrical release poster
- Directed by: Nuel Crisostomo Naval
- Written by: Mel Mendoza-del Rosario
- Produced by: Enrico Roque; Patrick Meneses; Jacky Lim
- Starring: Sharon Cuneta; Alden Richards
- Cinematography: Anne Monzon
- Edited by: Beng Bandong
- Music by: Jose Buencamino
- Production companies: Cineko Productions; MC Entertainment
- Distributed by: Axinite Digicinema Inc.
- Release date: December 25, 2023
- Running time: 100 minutes
- Country: Philippines
- Language: Filipino

Family of Two (A Mother and Son Story) is a 2023 Philippine drama film written by Mel Mendoza-del Rosario and directed by Nuel Crisostomo Naval. Starring Sharon Cuneta and Alden Richards, the film revolves around a worried son who seeks to find a man as a partner for his single mother.

A film produced by Cineko Productions, it was released on December 25, 2023, and it is one of the entries for the 49th Metro Manila Film Festival.

== Plot ==
This is a story about a family of two, a mother and a son. Maricar (Sharon Cuneta) became a widow when Mateo (Alden Richards) was only five years old. She became a single mother and supported Mateo alone. But what will happen if her only son decided to move to another country?

== Cast ==
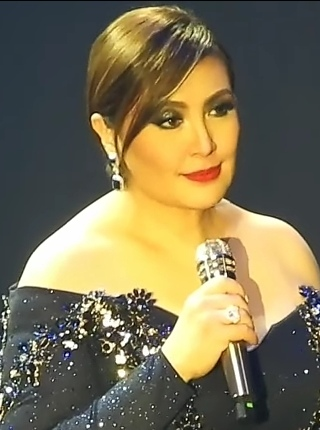
Sharon Cuneta, portrays Maricar

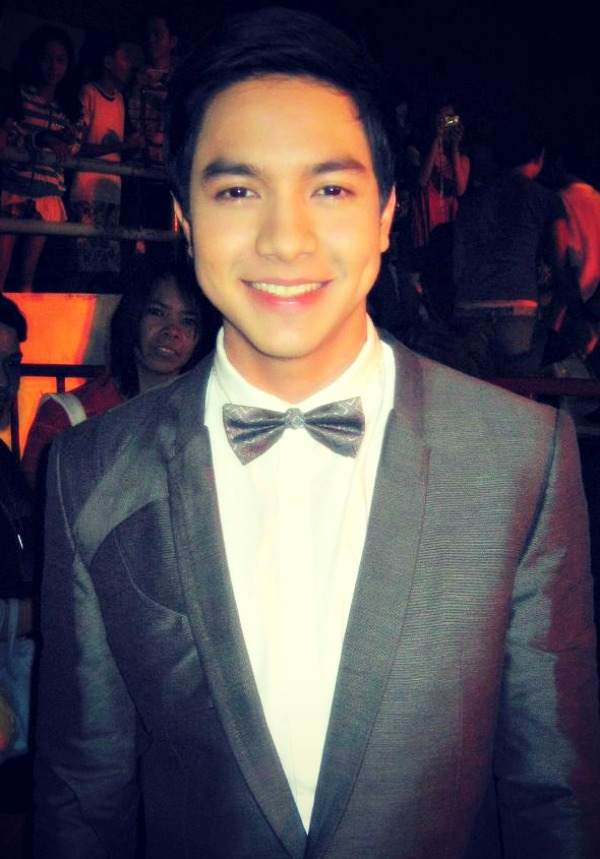
Alden Richards, portrays Mateo

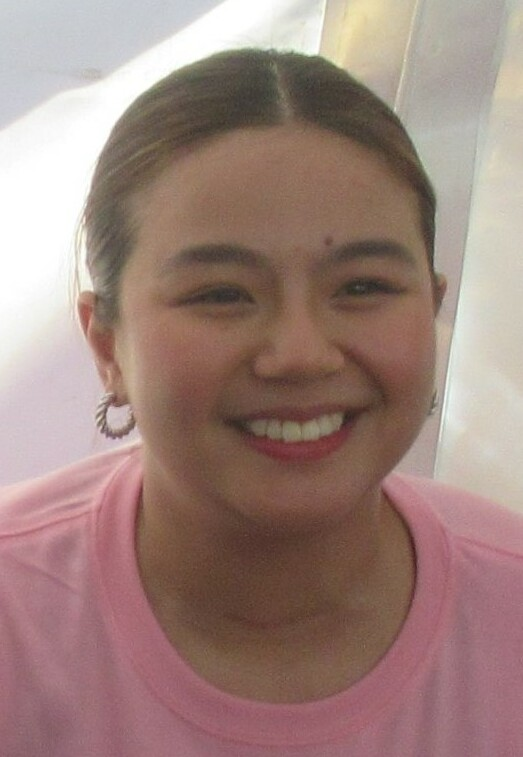
Miles Ocampo, portrays Czarina

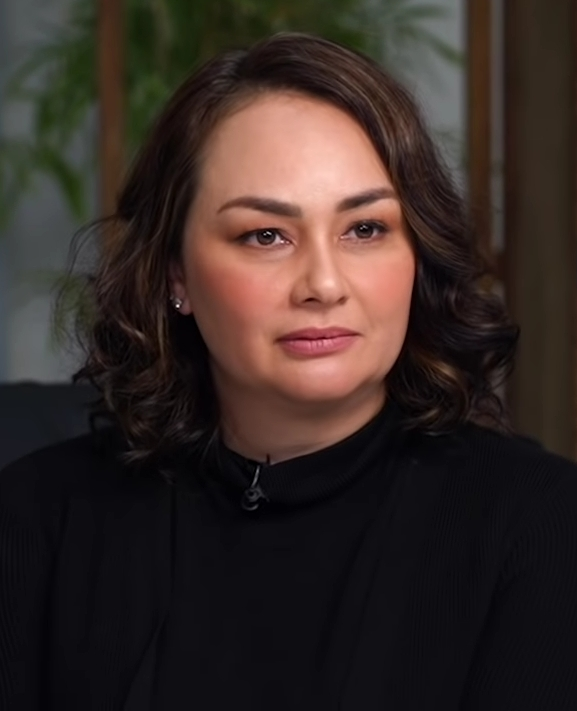
Donita Rose, portrays Marissa

Main cast

- Sharon Cuneta as Maricar, a single mother who became a widow when her son was five years old.
- Alden Richards as Mateo, Maricar's only child. Planning to move to Singapore with his girlfriend, Mateo seeks to find a new partner for his mother.
- Miles Ocampo as Czarina, Mateo's girlfriend.

Supporting cast

- Jackie Lou Blanco as Mrs. Odette Ignacio
- Tonton Gutierrez as Ted
- Soliman Cruz as Roger
- Pepe Herrera as Paeng
- Donna Cariaga as Donna
- Donita Rose as Marissa, Maricar's sister

== Production ==
Family of Two was produced under Cineko Productions. Nuel Naval is the director while Mel Medoza-del Rosario is the writer. The film was already in post-production by September 2023. Cuneta is the first choice for the role by Cineko Productions owner Enrico Roque, who wanted to produce a film specifically for the actress. Richards drew inspiration from his mother who has been deceased since 2008 for his portrayal. He noted that for this portrayal, he had to deal with a character who no longer has a living father in contrast to his own situation.

== Release ==
Family of Two premiered in cinemas in the Philippines on December 25, 2023, as one of the official entries of the 2023 Metro Manila Film Festival.

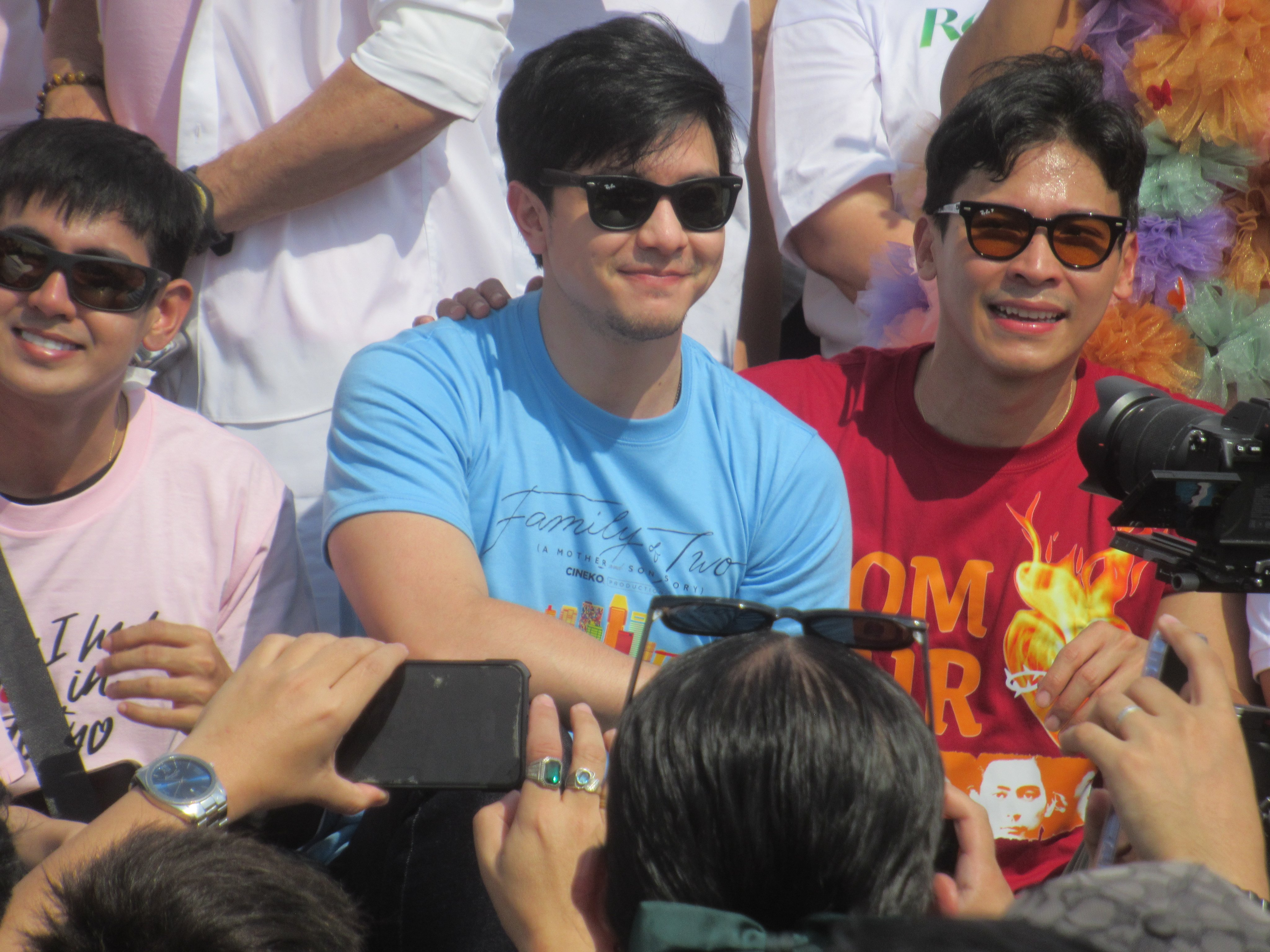
Alden Richards Parade of Stars

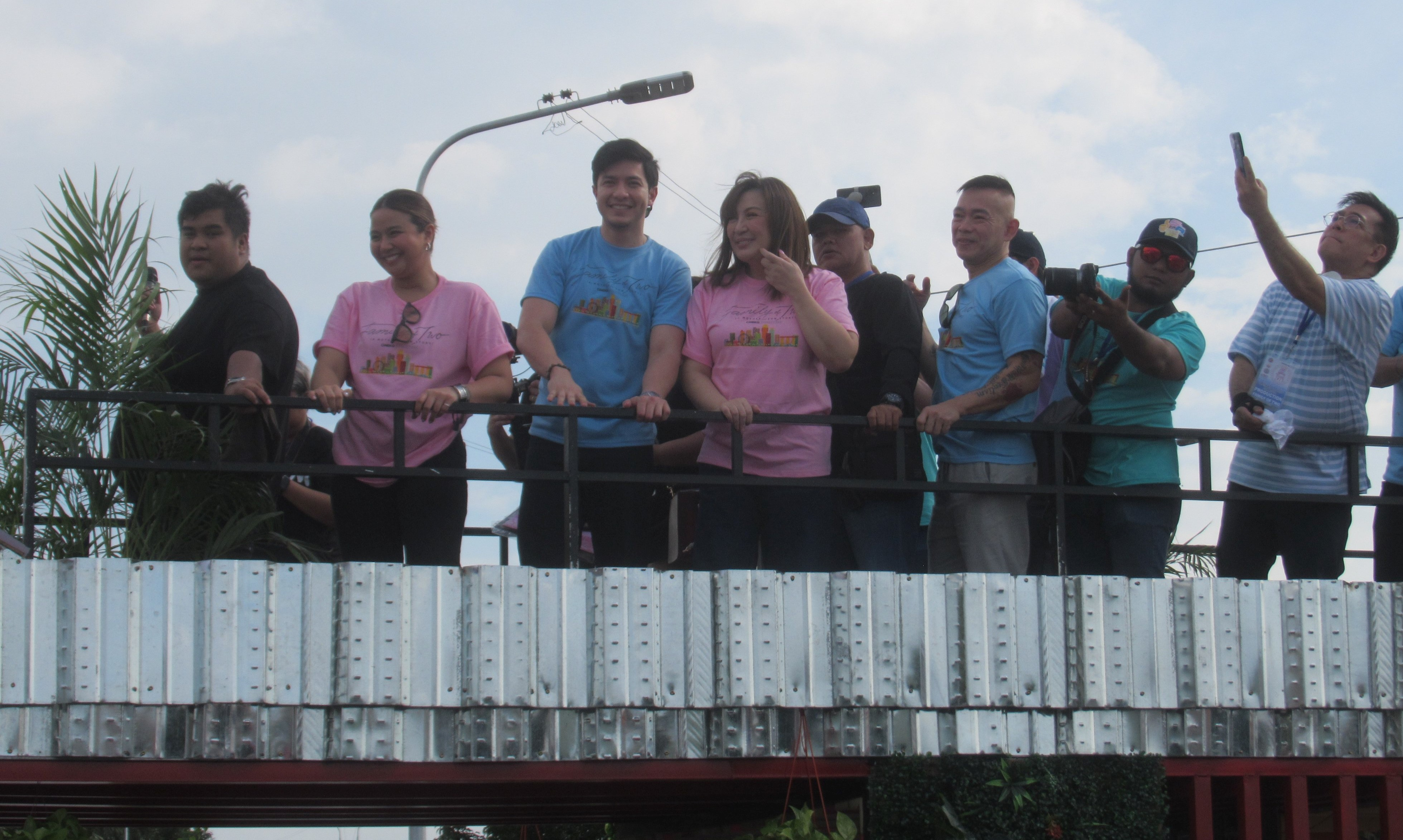
Float Parade of Casts

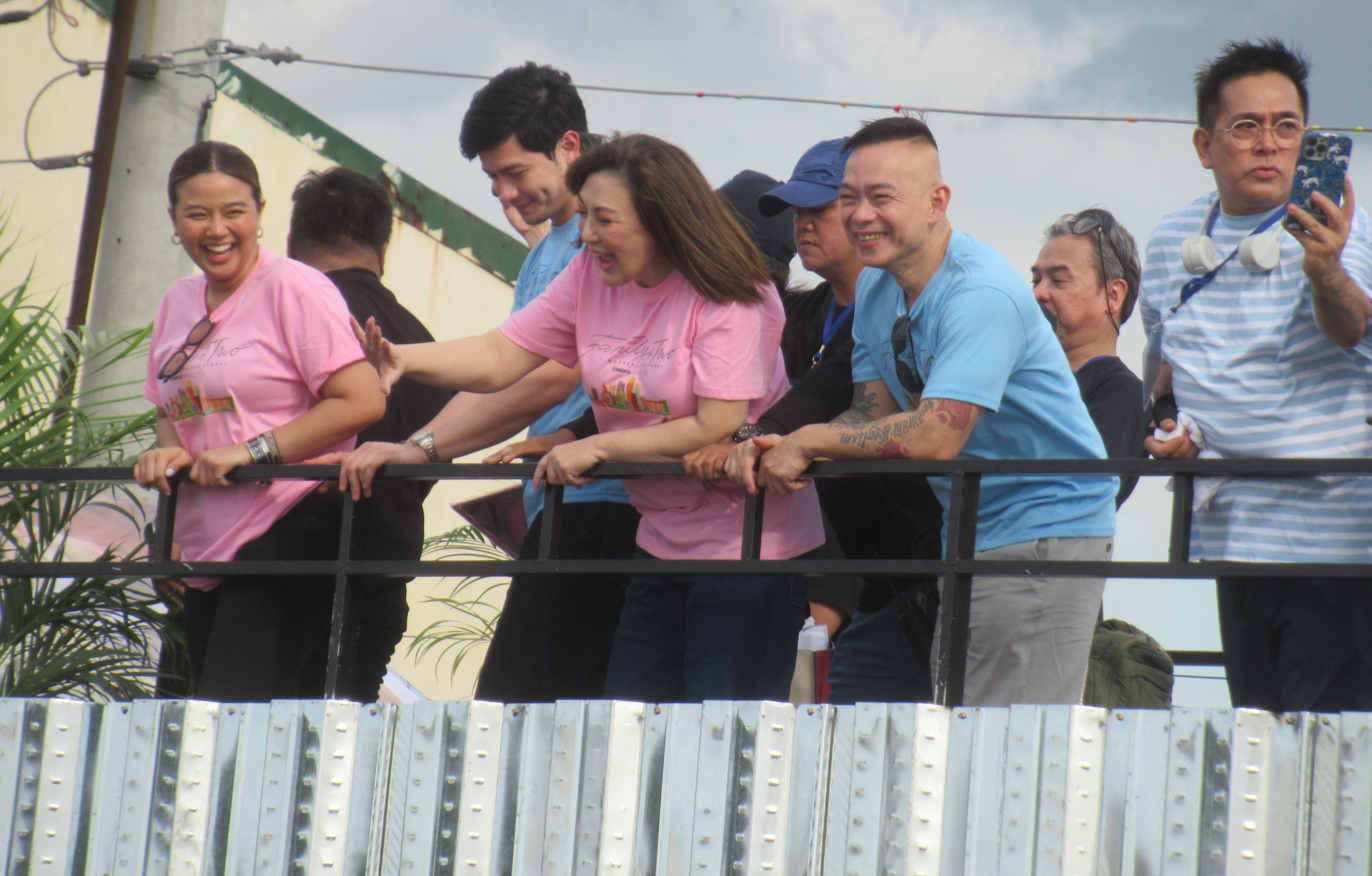
Festival Float

== Accolades ==
Accolades received by Family of Two
Award	Date of ceremony	Category	Recipient(s)	Result	Ref.
2023 Metro Manila Film Festival	December 27, 2023	Best Actor	Alden Richards	Nominated	
2023 Metro Manila Film Festival	December 27, 2023	Best Actress	Sharon Cuneta	Nominated	
2023 Metro Manila Film Festival	December 27, 2023	Best Supporting Actress	Miles Ocampo	Won	
2023 Metro Manila Film Festival	December 27, 2023	Best Sound	Promovi	Nominated	
2023 Metro Manila Film Festival	December 27, 2023	Best Original Theme Song	"Sa Yakap Mo" from Family of Two – by Iyah Ladip-Guanzon and Ralph Padiernos	Nominated	
2023 Metro Manila Film Festival	December 27, 2023	Fernando Poe Jr. Memorial Award for Excellence	Family of Two	Nominated	
2023 Metro Manila Film Festival	December 27, 2023	Gender Sensitivity Award	Family of Two	Nominated	
