= Becky & Badette =

2023 comedy film by Jun Robles Lana

- Theatrical release poster
- Directed by: Jun Robles Lana
- Written by: Jun Robles Lana
- Produced by: Jun Robles Lana; Perci Intalan; Ferdinand Lapuz
- Starring: Eugene Domingo; Pokwang
- Cinematography: Kara Moreno
- Edited by: Benjamin Tolentino
- Music by: Teresa Barrozo
- Production companies: The IdeaFirst Company; OctoberTrain Films
- Distributed by: The IdeaFirst Company
- Release date: December 25, 2023
- Running time: 114 minutes
- Country: Philippines
- Language: Filipino

Becky & Badette is a 2023 Philippine revenge buddy comedy film written, co-produced, and directed by Jun Robles Lana. Starring Eugene Domingo and Pokwang, it revolves around the story of two best friends since high school who gain fame over a viral video that tackled woman-to-woman relationship.

Produced by The IdeaFirst Company and OctoberTrain Films, it was theatrically released on December 25, 2023, as one of the official entries for the 49th Metro Manila Film Festival.

== Plot ==
Plot is patterned after the musical, Dear Evan Hansen.

Becky (Eugene Domingo) and Badette (Pokwang) are best friends. They work as maintenance personnel in a corporate building. While on break, they sell packed foods and their own specialty, fried chicken.

One day, their schoolmate, Nirvana (Agot Isidro) organizes a high school reunion. She went to a place where Becky and Badette reside to invite them to their reunion as their batchmates hadn't heard any update from them. Nirvana tells them they will receive an award from their alma mater and will wear colorful outfits. The batch expects them to be successful because their principal has said that they are the ones who are likely to succeed.

Becky and Badette go to the reunion. They are wearing colorful outfits, which are costumes from the bar beneath their boarding house. The whole batch ridicules them for their outfit, and worse, they ridicule them when Nirvana gives awards to every batchmate, except them. So they resort to drinking and get drunk.

While drunk, they reveal to the batch over the microphone that they are actually lovers. Their revelation is recorded on video and the video goes viral. This viral video becomes their gateway to their fame... and downfall.

== Cast ==
- Eugene Domingo as Becky Naman
- Pokwang as Badette Imaculada
- Agot Isidro as Nirvana Batungbakal; Becky and Badette's schoolmate and nemesis. She holds a grudge against the two.
- Romnick Sarmenta as Pepe Feniz, the love interest of Becky and Badette
- Adrian Lindayag as Bona
- Peewee O'Hara as Aida
- Angie Castrence as Fe
- Sue Prado as Fifi
- Diana Alferez as Lala
- Iza Calzado as Working Girl 1
- Karylle as Working Girl 2
- Sunshine Dizon as Working Girl 3
- Via Antonio as Security Guard
- Moira Dela Torre as Herself
- Christian Bables as Luka
- Empoy Marquez as TV Assistant director
- Ice Seguerra as Himself
- Sigrid Andrea Bernardo as Herself
- Gladys Reyes as Herself
- Sheryn Regis as Herself
- Janice de Belen as Herself
- Joross Gamboa as Commercial Director
- Sharlene San Pedro as Herself
- Samantha Ashley Lo as Herself
- Press Hit Play as Pop male group
- Timothy Castillo as Boatman
- Thysz Estrada as Herself

== Production ==
Becky & Badette was produced under The IdeaFirst Company and OctoberTrain Films with Jun Lana as the director and scriptwriter. Lana described the film as a "love story for Philippine cinema", with the film made as a tribute to Dolphy, Sharon Cuneta and Maricel Soriano. It also has reference to film performances by Vilma Santos. Its main plot is patterned after the musical, Dear Evan Hansen.

Lana cast the main two leads Pokwang and Eugene Domingo after seeing their performance in a short scene in Sampung Mga Kerida where they showed "electric chemistry".

== Sequel ==
Director Jun Lana is already working on a sequel for Becky & Badette as of November 2023, prior to the film's premiere.

== Release ==
Becky & Badette premiered in cinemas in the Philippines on December 25, 2023, as one of the official entries of the 2023 Metro Manila Film Festival.

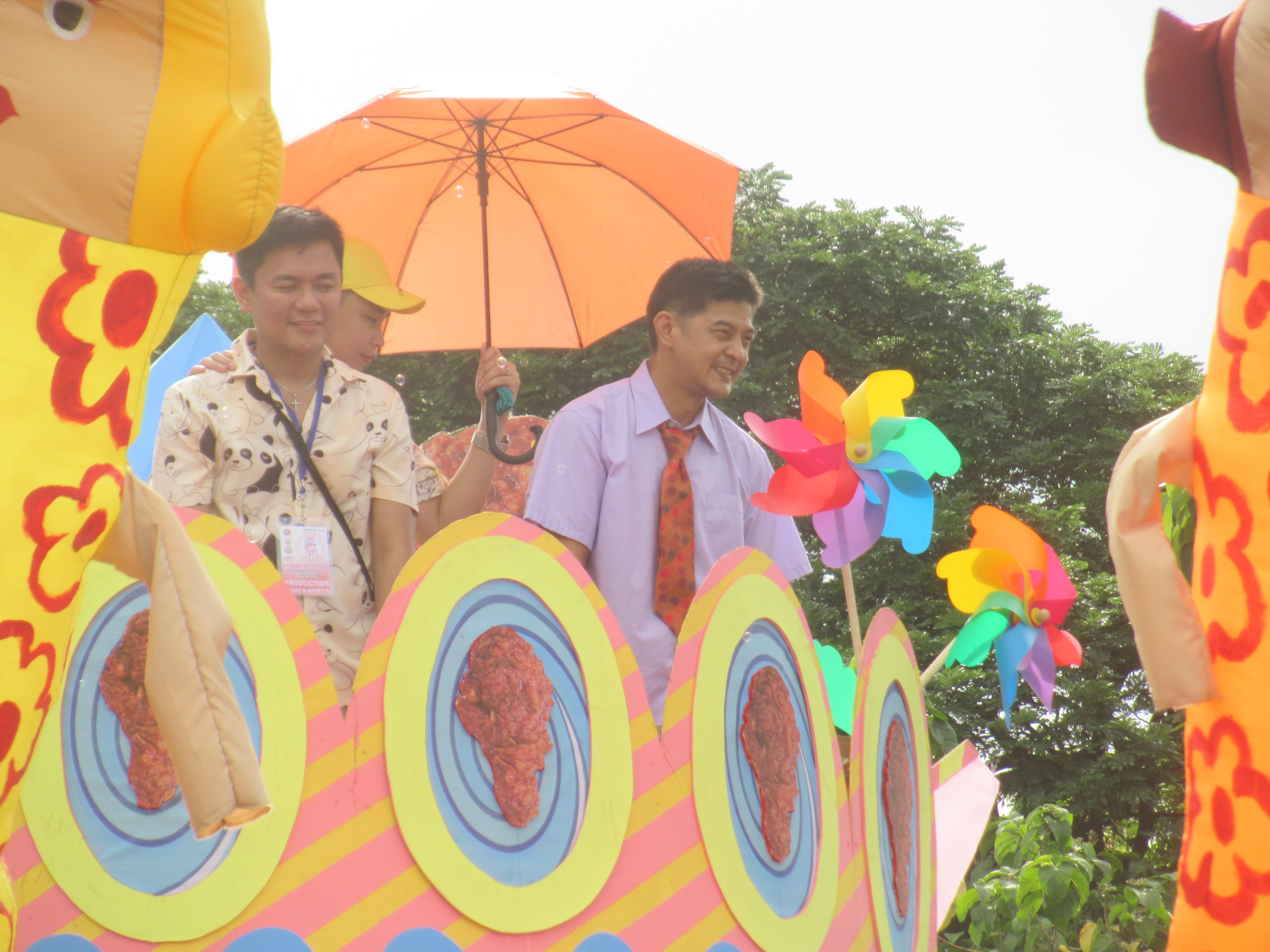
Float Parade of Stars

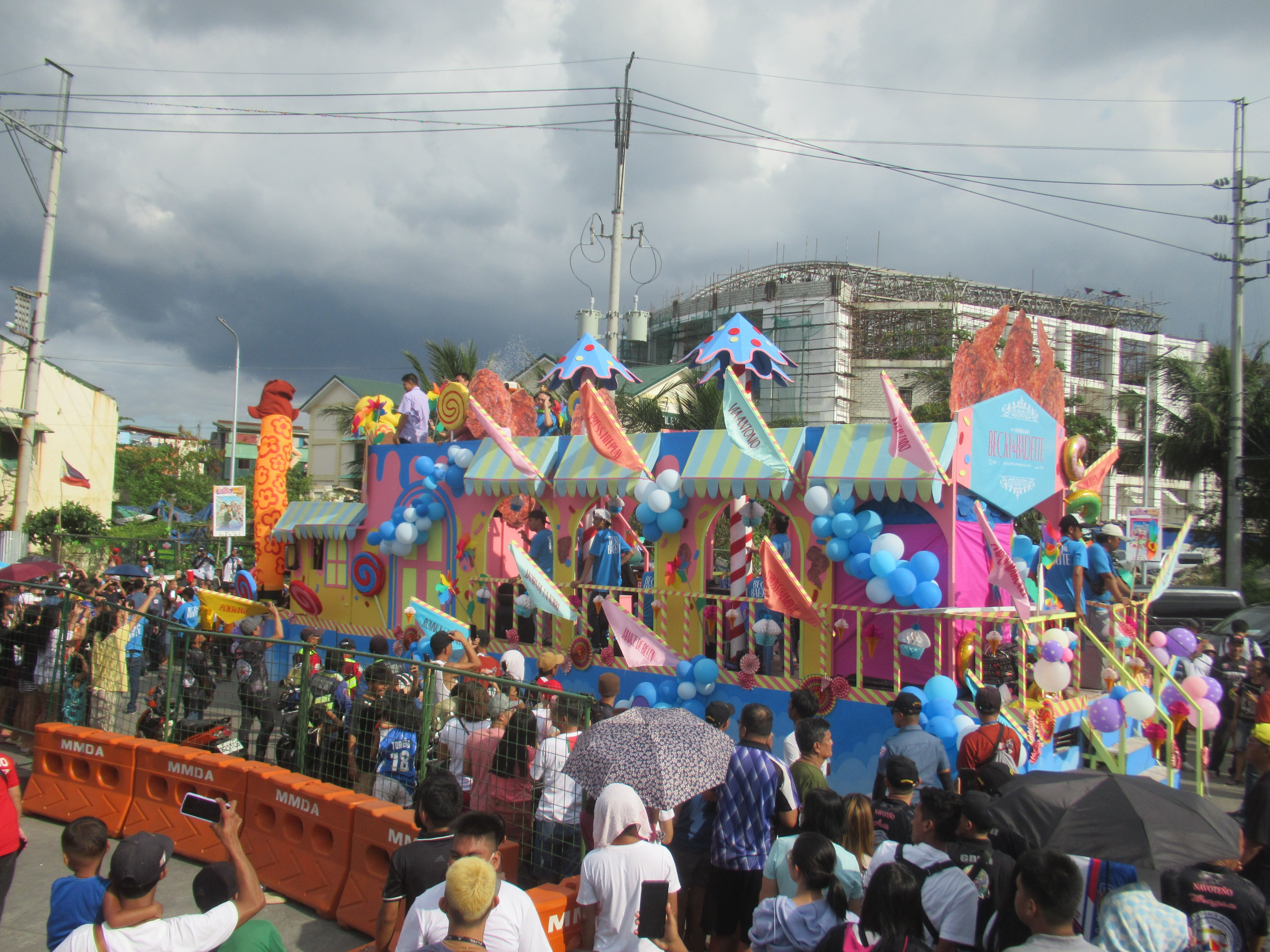
Float Parade of Casts

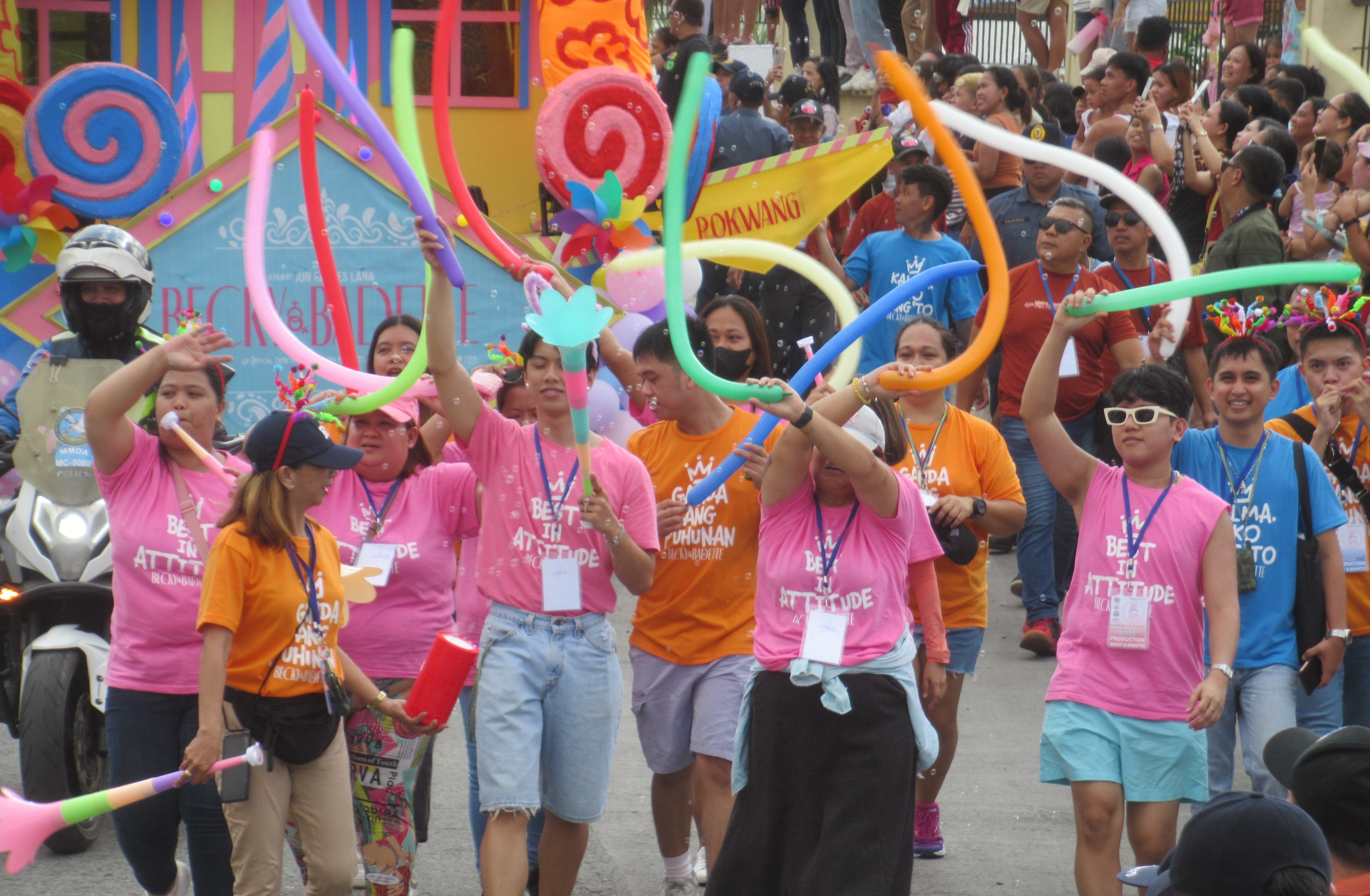
Parade of Stars

== Accolades ==
Accolades received by Becky & Badette
Year	Award	Category	Recipient(s)	Result	Ref.
2023	Metro Manila Film Festival	Best Director	Jun Lana	Nominated	
2023	Metro Manila Film Festival	Best Actress	Eugene Domingo	Nominated	
2023	Metro Manila Film Festival	Best Actress	Pokwang	Nominated	
2023	Metro Manila Film Festival	Best Supporting Actor	Romnick Sarmenta	Nominated	
2023	Metro Manila Film Festival	Best Supporting Actress	Agot Isidro	Nominated	
2023	Metro Manila Film Festival	Best Cinematography	Kara Moreno	Nominated	
2023	Metro Manila Film Festival	Best Production Design	Jaylo Conanan	Nominated	
2023	Metro Manila Film Festival	Best Sound	Armand de Guzman	Nominated	
2023	Metro Manila Film Festival	Best Original Theme Song	"Finggah Lickin" from Becky & Badette – by Eugene Domingo	Won	
2023	Metro Manila Film Festival	Gender Sensitivity Award	Becky & Badette	Won	
2024	Platinum Stallion Media Awards	Comedy Film of the Year	Becky & Badette	Won	
2024	Manila International Film Festival	Special Jury Prize	Becky & Badette	Won	
