= Penduko =

2023 Philippine superhero film

- Theatrical release poster
- Directed by: Jason Paul Laxamana
- Written by: Jason Paul Laxamana
- Based on: Pedro Penduko by Francisco V. Coching
- Produced by: Vincent Del Rosario; Veronique Del Rosario; Valerie Del Rosario; Sienna Olaso; Paul Basinillo
- Starring: Matteo Guidicelli; John Arcilla; Kylie Verzosa; Albert Martinez
- Cinematography: Alex Espartero
- Edited by: Mai Calapardo
- Music by: Paulo Protacio
- Production companies: Sari-Sari Films; Studio Viva; MQuest Ventures; Epik Studios; Ninuno Media
- Distributed by: Viva Films
- Release date: December 25, 2023
- Running time: 109 minutes
- Country: Philippines
- Language: Filipino

Penduko (Baybayin: ᜉᜒᜈ᜔ᜇᜓᜃᜓ) is a 2023 Philippine superhero film written and directed by Jason Paul Laxamana. Based on the Liwayway character Pedro Penduko, it serves as a reboot of the character's various film and television adaptations. The film starred Matteo Guidicelli as the titular character along with Kylie Verzosa and John Arcilla. Produced by Sari Sari Network, the film was released on December 25, 2023 as an entry to the 2023 Metro Manila Film Festival.

== Cast ==
- Matteo Guidicelli as Pedro Penduko, a young man gifted with supernatural powers from his ancestors. This incarnation of the character is a native of the province of Cebu who comes to Metro Manila to pursue a better life as opposed to previous iterations of the character who remained bounded in a rural settings.
  - Keagan de Jesus as young Pedro Penduko
- John Arcilla as Apo Tisot, Pedro's father who is also blessed with supernatural powers who uses his abilities for the indigents.
- Albert Martinez as Gat Blanco, leader of a secret organization who taps Pedro to work as an albularyo.
- Kylie Verzosa as Liway
- Candy Pangilinan as Dayang Aurora
- Andrea del Rosario as Dayang Raya
- Arron Villaflor as Saki
- Phoebe Walker as Wendy
- Cindy Miranda
- Arjo Atayde
- Annika Co as Yap Yap
- Zombie Tugue as Kuya Mon
- JC Tiuseco as Jude
- TJ Valderrama as Bruno
- Gene Padilla as Gat Nimuel
- Andrea Babierra as Ivy
- Joe Vargas as Bernie
- Tyro Daylusan as Buding
- Migo Valid as Serafin
- Mimi Marquez as Mel
- Kamille Filoteo as Nancy
- Jobelyn Manuel
- Rabin Angeles as QJ
- Martin Venegas as Resty
- Kurt delos Reyes as Dumdom
- Charles Law as Gino
- Michael Keith as Miko
- VJ Vera as Wayne
- Rolando Inocencio as Gordon
- Khey Dalit as Fred

== Production ==
On August 10, 2017, Viva Films announced their intention to make a film reboot of the Pedro Penduko franchise by casting James Reid as Penduko; Reid had previously voiced his interest in portraying the role during the comic book launch of Regene Estolatan's reimagined Pedro Penduko in August 2016. Nadine Lustre was later cast as Maria Makiling on October 19, 2017. Treb Monteras II was initially hired as the film's director, while Estolatan was hired to write the film's screenplay.

On May 31, 2019, Reid was forced to drop out of the film due to a spinal injury. On October 22, 2019, Matteo Guidicelli was announced to have replaced Reid as Penduko for the film, with Laxamana now in the helm as both director and screenwriter and Sonny Sison as fight choreographer. Empoy Marquez and child actor Alonzo Muhlach were also cast for the film by this time, with the former to play the regular version of Pedro Penduko. By January 2020, it was revealed that Penduko will be depicted as a Cebuano, similar to Guidicelli.

On February 25, 2020, Guidicelli began attending an acting workshop with Laxamana and fellow cast members Marquez and Nicole Omillo in preparation for the film's production.

=== Filming ===
Principal photography began on August 21, 2023.

== Release ==
Penduko was originally slated for release on December 25, 2020 as an entry to the Metro Manila Film Festival (MMFF). However, due to the COVID-19 pandemic, the film was delayed indefinitely. In May 2023, Guidicelli confirmed that the film is still in the works. On July 10, 2023, the MMFF announced that Penduko was among the first four films to be accepted as entries to the festival 49th edition on December 25, 2023.

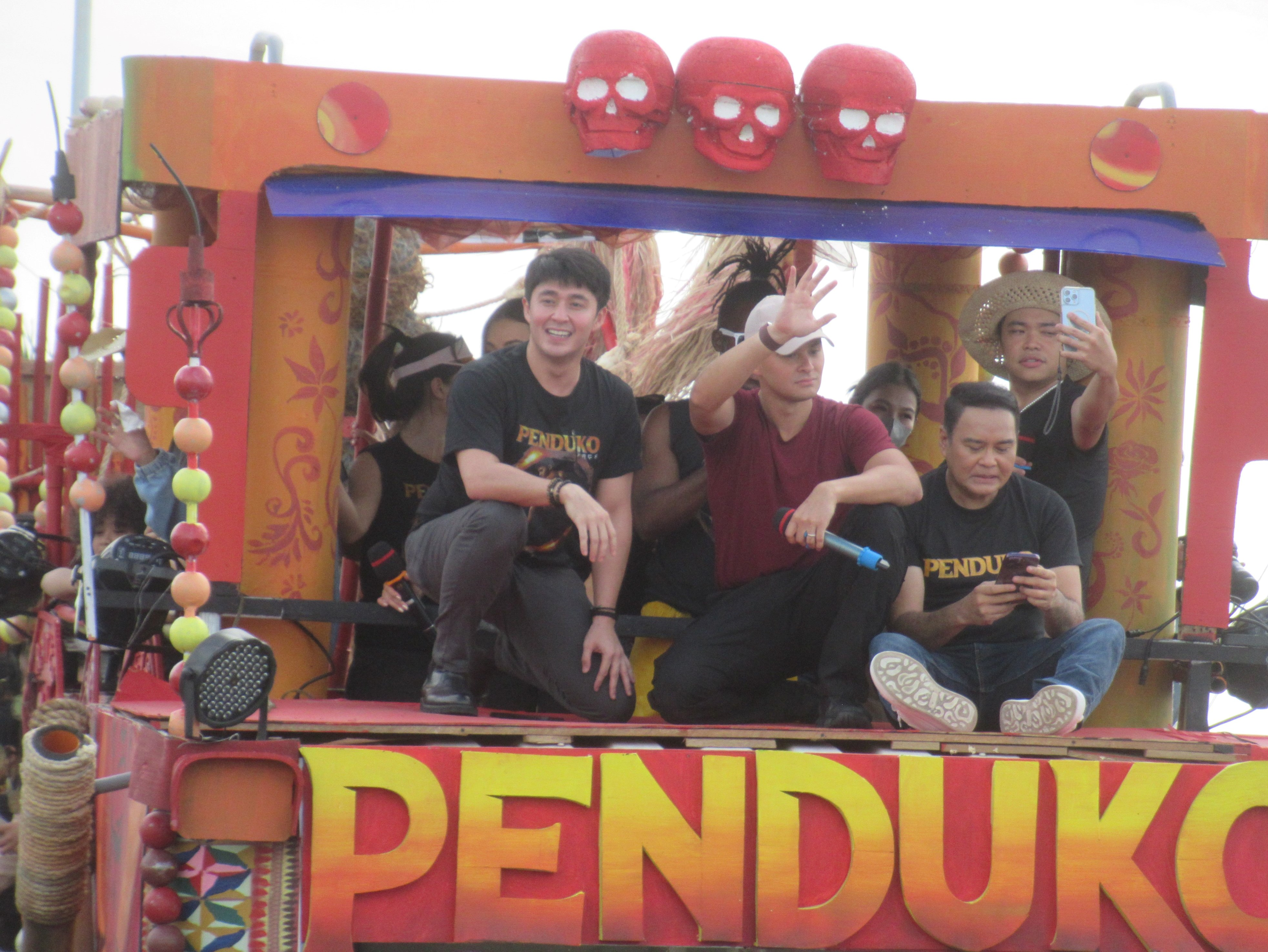
Float Parade of Stars

== Accolades ==
Accolades received by Penduko
Award	Date of ceremony	Category	Recipient(s)	Result	Ref.
2023 Metro Manila Film Festival	December 27, 2023	Best Production Design	Ericson Navarro	Nominated	
2023 Metro Manila Film Festival	December 27, 2023	Best Visual Effects	Gerwin Meneses	Nominated	
2023 Metro Manila Film Festival	December 27, 2023	Best Original Theme Song	"Dagundong" by Alamat	Nominated	
2023 Metro Manila Film Festival	December 27, 2023	Fernando Poe Jr. Memorial Award for Excellence	Penduko	Nominated	
