= Mallari =

Mallari is a Kapampangan-language surname. Notable people with the surname include:

- Alex Mallari (born 1987), Filipino-American basketball player
- Alex Mallari Jr. (born 1986), Canadian actor
- Erwin Mallari (born 1979), Filipino artist
- Guillrey Anthony Mallari Andal (born 1976), Filipino Jesuit priest
- Ismael Mallari, Filipino writer
- Joy Mallari (born 1966), Filipino painter and artist
- Juan Severino Mallari (1785-1840), Filipino priest and the Philippines’ first recorded serial killer
- Linda Mallari, member of the rock band The Martinis
- Roberto Mallari (born 1958), Filipino prelate of the Catholic Church

== See also ==
- Mallari (film), 2023 Philippine horror film
