= 2022 Cinemalaya =

2022 film festival in Manila, Philippines

18th Cinemalaya Independent Film Festival
- Official festival poster
- Opening film: Leonor Will Never Die by Martika Ramirez Escobar
- Closing film: Delikado by Karl Malakunas and We Don't Dance for Nothing by Stefanos Tai
- Location: Metro Manila, Philippines
- Film titles: 23
- Festival date: August 5–14, 2022
- Language: English, Filipino, Hiligaynon
- Website: www.cinemalaya.org

Cinemalaya chronology
- 2023 2021

The 18th Cinemalaya Independent Film Festival was held from August 5–14, 2022 in Metro Manila, Philippines, with the theme being "Breaking Through the Noise". A total of eleven full-length features and twelve short films competed. The festival was opened by the film Leonor Will Never Die by Martika Ramirez Escobar and its closing film was Delikado by Karl Malakunas and We Don't Dance for Nothing by Stefanos Tai. This year marks the return of the full-length category as well as the festival's return to on-site screening since the breakout of the COVID-19 pandemic.

== Entries ==
The winning film is highlighted with boldface and a dagger.

=== Feature films ===
Title	Director	Cast	Genre
12 Weeks	Anna Isabelle Matutina	Max Eigenmann, Bing Pimentel, Vance Larena, and Claudia Enriquez	Drama
Angkas (The Backride)	Rainerio C. Yamson II	Joem Bascon, Benjamin Alves, Meryll Soriano, and Jolo Estrada	Drama, Magical Realism
Bakit 'Di Mo Sabihin? (Tell Her)	Real S. Florido	Janine Gutierrez and JC De Vera	Romance Drama
Batsoy	Ronald Espinosa Batallones	Sean Ethan Sotto, Karen Laurrie Mendoza, and Mariano Cambas	Drama, Fantasy
Blue Room	Ma-an L. Asuncion-Dagñalan	juan karlos, Harvey Bautista, Nourijune, Keoni Jin, and Elijah Canlas	Coming of Age, Comedy, Crime, Drama
Bula sa Langit (Trigger)	Sheenly Gener	Gio Gahol, Kate Alejandrino, and AIR	Drama
Ginhawa (Solace)	Christian Paolo Lat	Andrew Ramsay, Ruby Ruiz, Dido de la Paz, and Rolando Incocencio	Sports Drama
Kaluskos (Rustles)	Roman S. Perez Jr.	Coleen Garcia, Queenzy Calma, Karl Medina, Cara Gonzales, Elora Españo	Domestic Drama, Thriller
Kargo (Cargo)	TM Malones	Max Eigenmann, Jess Mendoza, Myles Robles, and Ronnie Lazaro (special participation)	Road Movie
Retirada (The Retiree)	Milo Alto Paz and Cynthia Cruz-Paz	Peewee O'Hara, Jerry O'Hara, Donna Cariaga, Dexter Doria, Nanding Josef, Lui Manansala, and Johana Basanta	Drama
**The Baseball Player** ^{†}	Carlo Obispo	Tommy Alejandrino, JM San Jose, Tess Antonio, Don Melvin Boongaling, Sue Prado, Pongs Leonardo, Joel Saracho, Bon Lentejas, Ely Cellan, and Arnold Reyes (special participation)	Social drama

=== Short films ===
Title	Director
Ampangabagat Nin Talakba Ha Likol (It's Raining Frogs Outside)	Maria Estela Paiso
**Black Rainbow** ^{†}	Zig Dulay
City of Flowers	Xeph Suarez
Dikit	Gabriela Serrano
Distance	Dexter Paul de Jesus
Duwa-Duwa	Nena Jane Achacoso
Mga Handum Nga Nasulat sa Barras (The Dreams That Are Written in the Sand)	Arlie Sweet Sumagaysay and Ricard Jeroui Salvadico
Mata Kang Busay (Vision of the Falls)	Niño Maldecir and Cyphor John Gayorgor
Kwits	Raz de la Torre
Roundtrip to Happiness	Claudia Fernando
See You, George!	Mark Moneda
Si Oddie	Maria Kydylee Torato

== Awards ==
The awards ceremony was held on August 14, 2022, at the Tanghalang Nicanor Abelardo (CCP Main Theater), Cultural Center of the Philippines. In the full-length category, Blue Room won the most awards with five, followed by The Baseball Player with four.

=== Feature films ===
- Best Film – The Baseball Player by Carlo Obispo
  - Special Jury Prize – Blue Room by Ma-an L. Asuncion Dagñalan
  - Audience Choice Award – Kargo by TM Malones
- Best Direction – Blue Room by Ma-an L. Asuncion Dagñalan
- Best Actor – Tommy Alejandrino for The Baseball Player
- Best Actress – Max Eigenmann for 12 Weeks
- Best Supporting Actor – Soliman Cruz for Blue Room
- Best Supporting Actress – Ruby Ruiz for Ginhawa
- Best Screenplay – Carlo Obispo for The Baseball Player
- Best Cinematography – Neil Daza for Blue Room
- Best Editing – Zig Dulay for The Baseball Player
- Best Sound Design – Pepe Manikan for Bula Sa Langit
- Best Original Music Score – Isha Abubakar for Retirada
- Best Production Design – Marxie Maolen Fadul for Blue Room

=== Short films ===
- Best Film – Black Rainbow by Zig Dulay
  - Special Jury Prize – Dikit by Gabriela Serrano
  - Audience Choice Award – Mga Handum Nga Nasulat Sa Baras by Arlie Sweet Sumagaysay and Richard Jeroui Salvadico
- Best Screenplay – Black Rainbow by Zig Dulay
- Best Direction – Gabriela Serrano for Dikit
