= Mallari (film) =

2023 film by Derick Cabrido

- Theatrical release poster
- Directed by: Derick Cabrido
- Written by: Enrico Santos
- Produced by: John Brian Diamante; Ronalyn Bana-ag
- Starring: Piolo Pascual; Janella Salvador; Elisse Joson; JC Santos; Gloria Diaz
- Cinematography: Pao Orendain
- Edited by: Noah Tonga
- Music by: Von de Guzman
- Production companies: Mentorque Productions; Clever Minds Inc.
- Distributed by: Warner Bros. Pictures
- Release date: December 25, 2023
- Running time: 130 minutes
- Country: Philippines
- Languages: Filipino; Kapampangan; Spanish; English
- Budget: ₱80 million
- Box office: ₱225 million

Mallari is a 2023 Filipino horror film directed by Derick Cabrido from a story and screenplay written by Enrico C. Santos. The film follows a doctor who discovers his connection to a series of mysterious deaths spanning three generations of his family. It stars Piolo Pascual in three roles: Juan Severino Mallari, a Catholic priest and serial killer during the Spanish colonial period; Johnrey, one of his fictional descendants in the post-World War II era; and Jonathan, a doctor living in the contemporary era.

The film made its premiere at the 49th Metro Manila Film Festival on December 25, 2023, where it won Best Supporting Actor for JC Santos, Best Musical Score, and Best Production Design, and a runner-up for Best Picture. At the 72nd FAMAS Awards, it earned 14 nominations and clinched 6 awards, including Best Picture.

== Plot ==
In 1812, Juan Severino, accompanied by his mother, Doña Facunda, arrives in Magalang to become its priest. While he is away, Maria Capac and other church servants transform Facunda into a manananggal. Maria tells Severino that Facunda is suffering from a terminal illness that can only be cured by consuming human flesh. Torn between damning himself and saving his mother, he decides to become a murderer after his sinister alter ego urges him to rid society of delinquents. Severino kills a corrupt landlord and two prostitutes, feeding them to his unaware mother, who begins to recover. As Severino continues his spree, Magalang's residents flee. Later, a man who claims to be a descendant of Severino appears to Facunda, warning her that Severino will be remembered as a killer, and forces Severino to confess his murders and Facunda's status as a manananggal. The man then scuffles with Severino before the Guardia Civil and a witness to the murders arrive and arrest Severino as the man suddenly disappears. In the commotion, Maria escapes with Facunda.

136 years later, in 1948, Johnrey stays at his ancestral residence in Magalang during the Hukbalahap Rebellion. He counters victims of an aswang attack, which Johnrey's boss dismisses as a CIA operation. Johnrey begins investigating a series of murders in Magalag, suspecting a connection to his ancestor. He dreams of going back to 1812, where he encounters Severino, Facunda, the ghosts of Severino's victims, and a boy named Jonathan who claims to be Johnrey's grandnephew from the future. Johnrey wakes up with Jonathan's blanket and realizes they both can astral project and travel through time. Johnrey returns to 1812 to film Severino and Facunda, compiling two reels addressed to Jonathan.

Johnrey returns to 1948 and finds an elderly Maria Capac and his servant Conching. Conching is revealed to be Capac's granddaughter, and they are holding Johnrey's wife, Felicity, and an aged Facunda, who has refused to eat human meat after Severino's arrest, hostage. They threaten to kill Felicity unless Johnrey agrees to become a vigilante and transfer Facunda's powers to her. While Facunda pleads for them to let her die, Johnrey swallows a black chick living inside her, killing Facunda. Johnrey transforms into a werewolf and kills Conching and Maria. He reverts to human form, instructing Felicity to bury him alive and end the curse. Afterward, Felicity makes a film recounting the events.

In 2023, an adult Jonathan suffers from premonitions about his fiancée Agnes. In an effort to prevent them from coming true, Jonathan travels to Magalang. He brings the son of a family servant, Lucas, and Lucas' niece Amal, who tells Jonathan of his ancestors' past. Shortly after his arrival, a serial killer dressed as a priest carries out several vigilante killings. Jonathan is considered a suspect, so he confesses to Lucas that Severino may be playing a role, and that Lucas would soon attack Agnes.

Jonathan watches Johnrey's films and learns about his psychic abilities. Agnes helps Jonathan investigate the premonitions, learning that Lucas belongs to the occult-worshipping Alarcon family and that he is a descendant of Maria Capca. She later sees Lucas flagellating himself before a statue of Severino, which reveals him to be the killer. Agnes flees to the Mallari residence, where Lucas stabs her. Jonathan returns to 1812 to confront Severino, who denies his involvement in the future murders. He wakes up to Lucas attacking him, as Lucas plans to turn Jonathan into a vigilante as part of Alacorn tradition. Jonathan kills Lucas, later coming across a dying Agnes as Felicity's film plays, revealing that the chick remains inside Johnrey.

Jonathan exhumes Johnrey's grave and, despite warnings from the spirits of Severino, his victims, and a still-living Johnrey against reviving the curse, decapitates Johnrey and transfers the chick to Agnes. Sometime afterwards, Jonathan, Agnes, and Amal settle at the Mallari residence. Agnes chastises Jonathan for turning her into a monster, adding that she will be hungry at the full moon. Jonathan looks menacingly at the camera.

== Cast ==
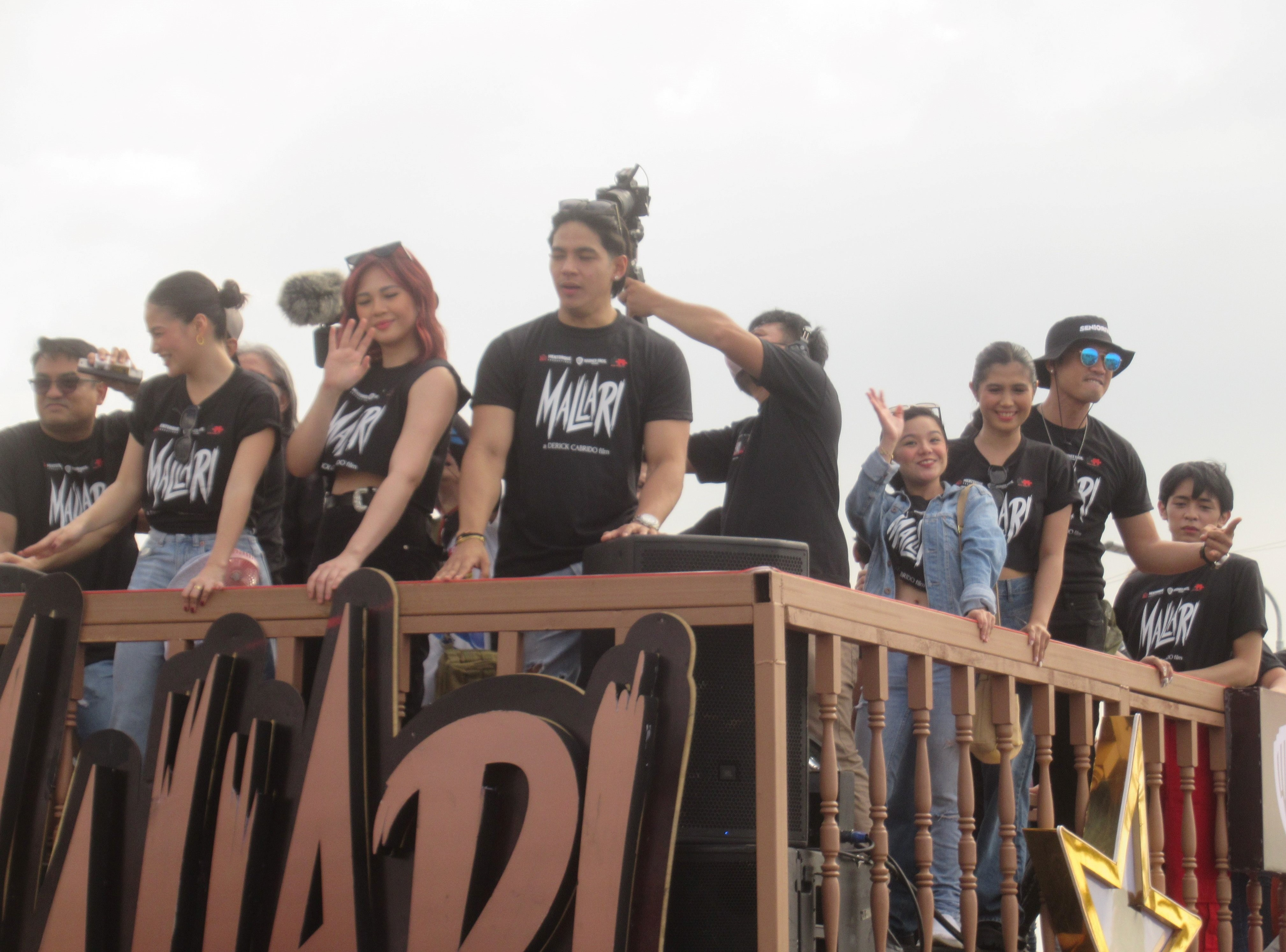
Cast members on board the Mallari float of the 2023 Metro Manila Film Festival's Parade of the Stars

=== 1810s ===
- Piolo Pascual as Juan Severino Mallari, Catholic parish priest and serial killer. He also plays his sinister alter-ego who convinces him to commit the murders.
- Gloria Diaz as Doña Facunda Mallari
- Ge Villamil as Maria Capadocia "Maria Capac" Alarcon
- Audrey Alquiroz as Nieves
- Ron Angeles as Juancho Kuchero
- Bart Guingona as Ruizmayor
- Mylene Dizon as Melinda
- Kian Co as Ponce, Melinda's son

=== 1940s ===
- Piolo Pascual as Johnrey Mallari, a photojournalist and grand-nephew of Juan Severino
- Elisse Joson as Felicity Mallari
- April Sangco as Conching
- Vangie Labalan as Older Maria Capac
- Erlinda Villalobos as Older Facunda Mallari

=== 2020s ===
- Piolo Pascual as Jonathan Mallari de Dios, a doctor, and great-grandnephew of Juan Severino.
- Janella Salvador as Agnes Salvador, a doctor who is also Jonathan's fiancée.
- JC Santos as Brother Lucas Alarcon Segundo, a Catholic deacon
- Tommy Alejandrino as Didi Laan
- Angeli Nicole Sanoy as Amalia "Amal" Alarcon
- Raffy Tejada as Father Mac

== Production ==
Mallari was directed by Derick Cabrido and was based on the script written by Enrico Santos. The script underwent seven revisions before filming. The film was produced under Mentorque Productions and Clever Minds.

The film is based around the Philippines' first documented serial killer, Severino Mallari, and has three intertwined main storylines set in different periods (1840s, 1940s, and 2023). The film, described as "partly fictional," follows the story of John Rey and Jonathan in the latter two timelines.

It took four years for the film to be made and took place in various historical sites in the Philippines. A village set in Lipa, Batangas was also specifically done for the film since no location owner in the area where the historical Mallari lived gave their consent due to the "sensitive topic" tackled in the film. ₱80 million was spent for the production of the film, which is also made to meet the standards of distributor Warner Bros.

Pascual was also the first choice to portray the film's three main characters. If Pascual had declined, the casting of one actor for multiple characters would have not been made.

== Music ==
The theme song for Mallari is "Pag-Ibig Na Sumpa" (transl. Love Curse), which was performed by Juan Karlos. Xergio Ramos and Emil Dela Rosa were responsible for the song's arrangement, while Quest did the composition. This is Karlos' first song, which was used in a feature film soundtrack.

== Release ==
Mallari premiered in cinemas in the Philippines on December 25, 2023, as one of the official entries of the 2023 Metro Manila Film Festival (MMFF). Warner Bros. Pictures partnered with Mentorque, agreeing to be the film's distributor. Despite having a multinational distributor, Mallari had to abide to MMFF regulations when it comes to cinema screenings. This is Warner Bros' first mainstream film release of a Philippine production. Their last project in the Philippines was the limited release of Munting Tinig in 2003. In addition, Star Cinema handled worldwide sales, which previously turned down on local distribution of the film although Warner Bros. would distribute the film in Thailand on May 1.

== Accolades ==
Accolades received by Mallari
Award	Date of ceremony	Category	Recipient(s)	Result	Ref.
Metro Manila Film Festival	December 27, 2023	Best Picture	Mallari	3rd Best Picture	
Metro Manila Film Festival	December 27, 2023	Best Director	Derick Cabrido	Nominated	
Metro Manila Film Festival	December 27, 2023	Best Actor	Piolo Pascual	Nominated	
Metro Manila Film Festival	December 27, 2023	Best Supporting Actor	JC Santos	Won	
Metro Manila Film Festival	December 27, 2023	Best Supporting Actor	Tommy Alejandrino	Nominated	
Metro Manila Film Festival	December 27, 2023	Best Supporting Actress	Janella Salvador	Nominated	
Metro Manila Film Festival	December 27, 2023	Best Supporting Actress	Gloria Diaz	Nominated	
Metro Manila Film Festival	December 27, 2023	Best Screenplay	Enrico Santos	Nominated	
Metro Manila Film Festival	December 27, 2023	Best Cinematography	Juan Lorenzo Orendain	Nominated	
Metro Manila Film Festival	December 27, 2023	Best Editing	Noah Tonga and Nelson Villamayor	Nominated	
Metro Manila Film Festival	December 27, 2023	Best Production Design	Mariel Hizon	Nominated	
Metro Manila Film Festival	December 27, 2023	Best Sound	Immanuel Verona and Nerrika Salim	Nominated	
Metro Manila Film Festival	December 27, 2023	Metro Manila Film Festival Award for Best Musical Score	Von de Guzman	Won	
Metro Manila Film Festival	December 27, 2023	Best Visual Effects	Gaspar Mangalin	Won	
Manila International Film Festival	February 2, 2024	Best Actor	Piolo Pascual	Won	
FAMAS Awards	May 27, 2024	Best Picture	Mallari	Won	
FAMAS Awards	May 27, 2024	Best Director	Roderick Cabrido	Nominated	
FAMAS Awards	May 27, 2024	Best Actor	Piolo Pascual	Won (Note: Tied with Alfred Vargas.)	
FAMAS Awards	May 27, 2024	Best Supporting Actor	JC Santos	Nominated	
FAMAS Awards	May 27, 2024	Best Supporting Actress	Gloria Diaz	Won	
FAMAS Awards	May 27, 2024	Best Child Actor	Kian Co	Nominated	
FAMAS Awards	May 27, 2024	Best Screenplay	Enrico Santos	Won	
FAMAS Awards	May 27, 2024	Best Cinematography	Pao Orendain	Nominated	
FAMAS Awards	May 27, 2024	Best Visual Effects	Gaspar Mangarin	Won	
FAMAS Awards	May 27, 2024	Best Editing	Noah Tonga	Nominated	
FAMAS Awards	May 27, 2024	Best Production Design	Marielle Hizon	Won	
FAMAS Awards	May 27, 2024	Best Sound	Immanuel Verona and Nerrika Salim	Nominated	
FAMAS Awards	May 27, 2024	Best Original Song	Pag-ibig na Sumpa by Juan Karlos	Nominated	
FAMAS Awards	May 27, 2024	Best Musical Score	Von De Guzman	Nominated	
PMPC Star Awards for Movies	July 21, 2024	Movie Editor of the Year	Noah Tonga	Won	
PMPC Star Awards for Movies	July 21, 2024	Movie Sound Engineer of the Year	Immanuel Verona and Fatima Nerikka Salim	Won	
PMPC Star Awards for Movies	July 21, 2024	Movie Theme Song of the Year	"Pag-Ibig Na Sumpa"	Won	
PMPC Star Awards for Movies	July 21, 2024	Dekada Award	Piolo Pascual	Won	
