= Kampon (film) =

- Theatrical release poster
- Directed by: King Palisoc
- Written by: Dodo Dayao
- Story by: King Palisoc
- Produced by: Patricia Sumagui; Josabeth Alonso
- Starring: Derek Ramsay; Beauty Gonzalez
- Cinematography: Kara Moreno
- Edited by: Benjamin Tolentino
- Music by: Jazz Nicolas; Mikey Amistoso
- Production companies: Quantum Films; Brightlight Productions
- Distributed by: Quantum Films
- Release date: December 25, 2023
- Running time: 91 minutes
- Country: Philippines
- Language: Filipino

Kampon, stylized as (K)ampon (Note: transl. "Servant" (typically to something sinister), stylization separates the word ampon, Filipino for an "adopted" person), is a 2023 Philippine horror film by Quantum Films starring Beauty Gonzalez and Derek Ramsay.

== Premise ==
Clark (Derek Ramsay) and Eileen (Beauty Gonzalez), are a childless married couple of eight years. One day a girl named Jade (Erin Espiritu) knocks on their home's door claiming to be Clark's child. The girl is accepted temporarily into their home as the couple try to decide what to make of the situation. Soon after strange incidents begin to occur in the couple's life.

== Cast ==
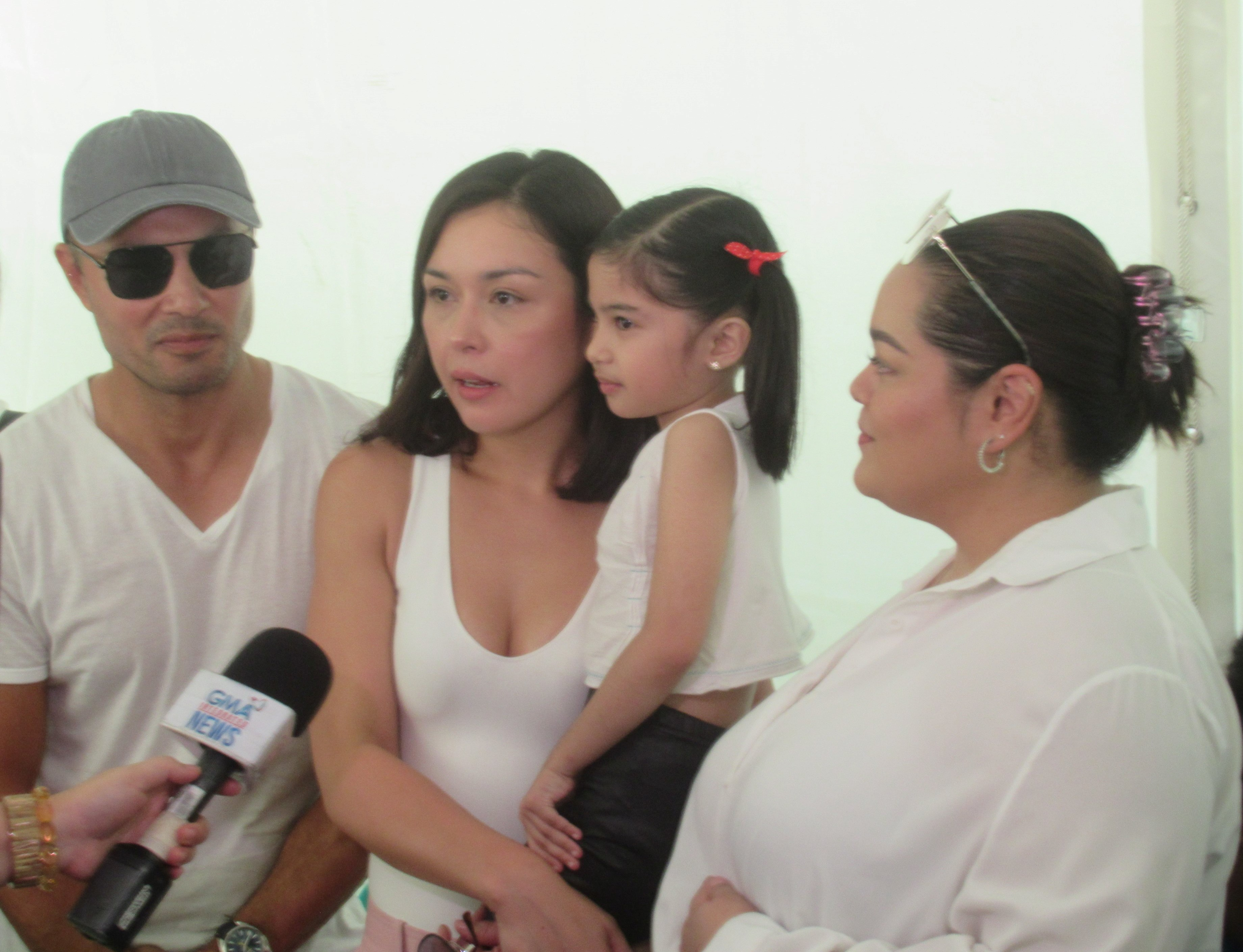
Derek Ramsay (left), Beauty Gonzalez (center-left), and Erin Espiritu (carried by Gonzalez)

- Derek Ramsay as Clark Martinez, the male protagonist of the film and Eileen's husband of eight years. The couple has no children of their own. Clark is a police officer who has a secret past. The role was specifically written for Ramsay. In 2019, Ramsay was unavailable at the time which made the producers consider Gabby Concepcion to portray the character instead. Ramsay came broke his hiatus for he film upon the request of producer Joji Alonso. Ramsay expressed being challenged in the portrayal given that horror is a not a typical genre for him.
- Beauty Gonzalez as Eileen Martinez, the female protagonist of the film and Clark's wife of eight years. The couple has no children of their own. Kris Aquino originally cast in the role before it was transferred to Gonzalez.
- Erin Espiritu as Jade Bitangcol, a girl who claims to be Clark's child who Clark and Eileen welcomed to their home. Supernatural incidents occur shortly after. The role for Jade was filled through auditioning. Espiritu was a contestant in the child pageant segment "Mini Miss U" of It's Showtime. An acting coach and psychologist was hired for Espiritu to help her fulfill her role.
- Zeinab Harake as Loretta Bitangcol, a woman Clark had a one night stand with. Despite Clark being infertile, she claims him to be the father of her child. Kampon is the first ever acting project, for Harake who is better known for being a vlogger. Her appearance is billed as an introductory role.
- Nico Antonio as Ranulfo
- Lui Manansala as Na Almera
- Al Tantay as Luis
- Cai Cortez as Rhona
- Nor Domingo as Jake Manabat
- Kean Cipriano as Manuel Perez

Other cast members for Kampon include Nico Antonio, Nor Domingo, Lui Manansala Cai Cortez, Al Tantay, and Kean Cipriano.

== Production ==
Kampon was produced under Quantum Films with King Palisoc as the director.

=== Planned 2019 film ===
Kampon was a submission for the Metro Manila Film Festival as early as for the 2019 edition. The original lead actors were Kris Aquino and Derek Ramsay. However Ramsay was unavailable due to prior commitments with a television series with GMA Network. Ramsay was replaced by Gabby Concepcion as the male lead but production was not able to be completed in time. Consequentially Kampon was disqualified as an entry for the 2019 festival.

=== Continued production ===
Kampon was re-submitted as a script entry for the 2023 edition. Ramsay is now available for the film project, with Beauty Gonzalez as his on-screen partner. This marks as Ramsay's return to acting who has been on hiatus.

According to Alonso, it took four years to produce the film. He said that it also "made use of storyboards to plan all of its scenes, which in the Philippines is more typically used by advertising agencies." It resulted to "more shots being made per sequence; to up to 36 shots per sequence and surpass the average of six shots per sequence in typical romance, drama, and comedy films", he added.

Principal photography was finished by September 21, 2023.

== Release ==
Kampon premiered in cinemas in the Philippines on December 25, 2023, as one of the official entries of the 2023 Metro Manila Film Festival.

Kampon was supposed to premiere in 2019 edition, but was disqualified due to production issues related to casting. Sunod was named as its replacement.

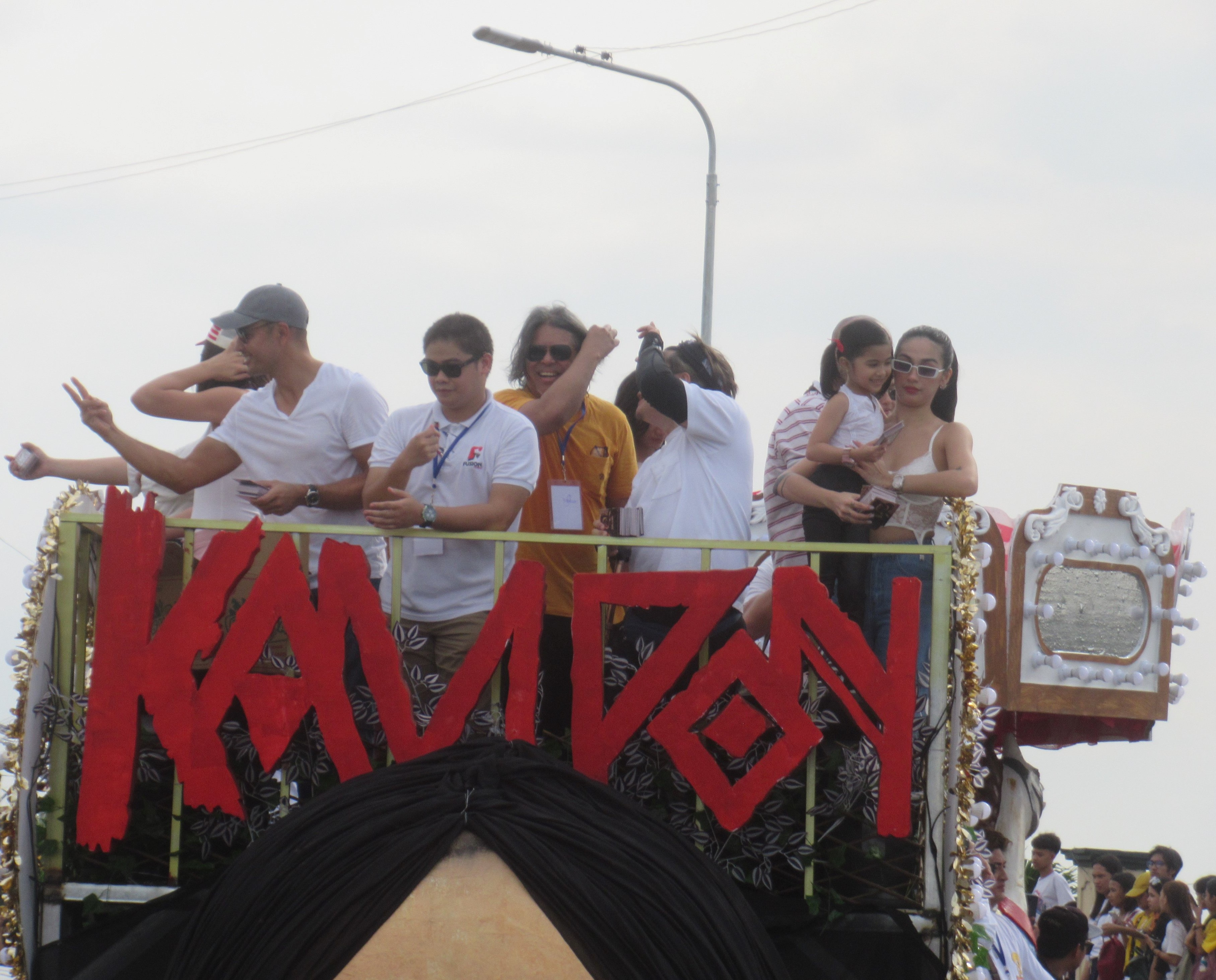
Float Parade of Stars

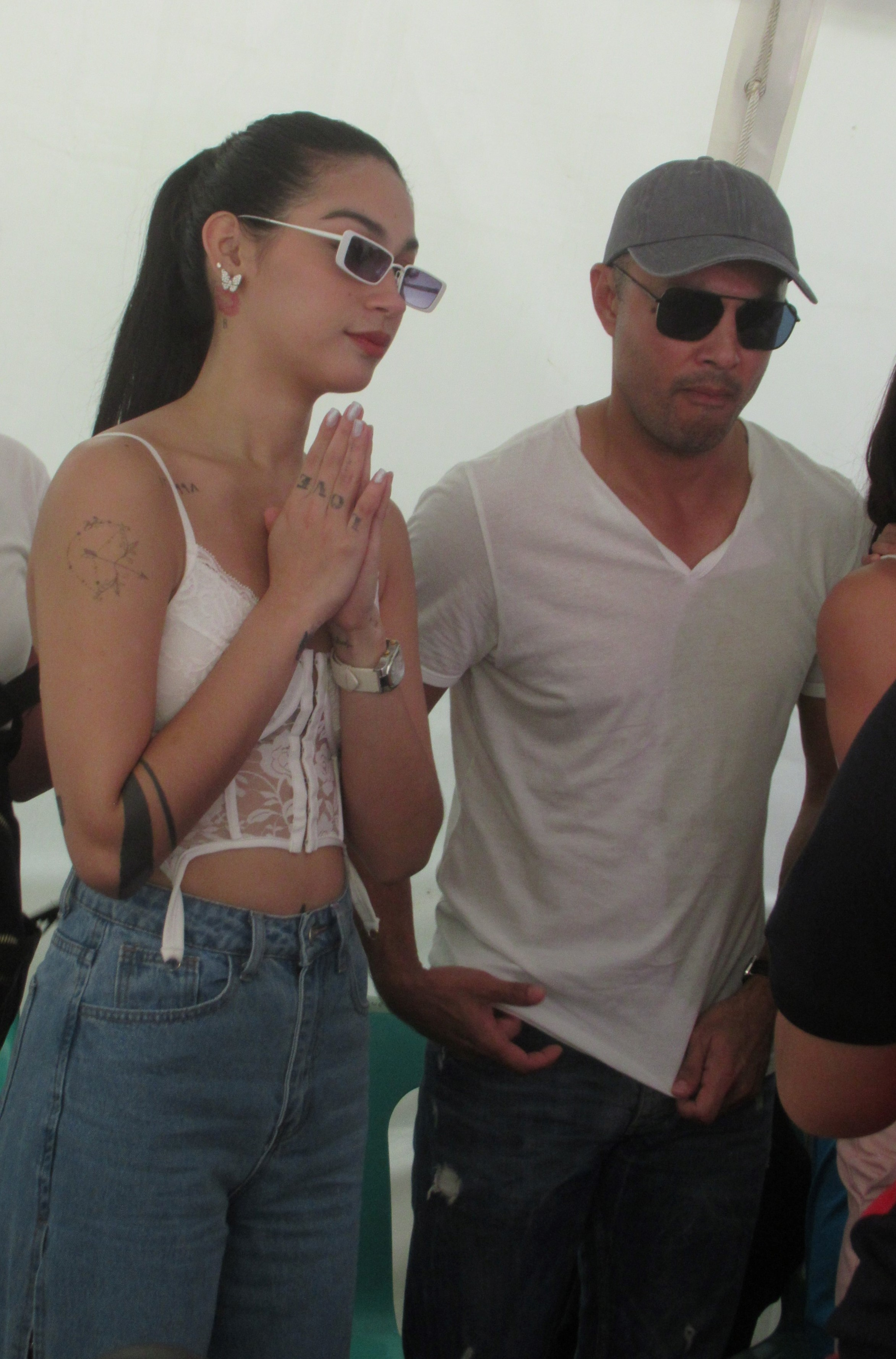
Main casts

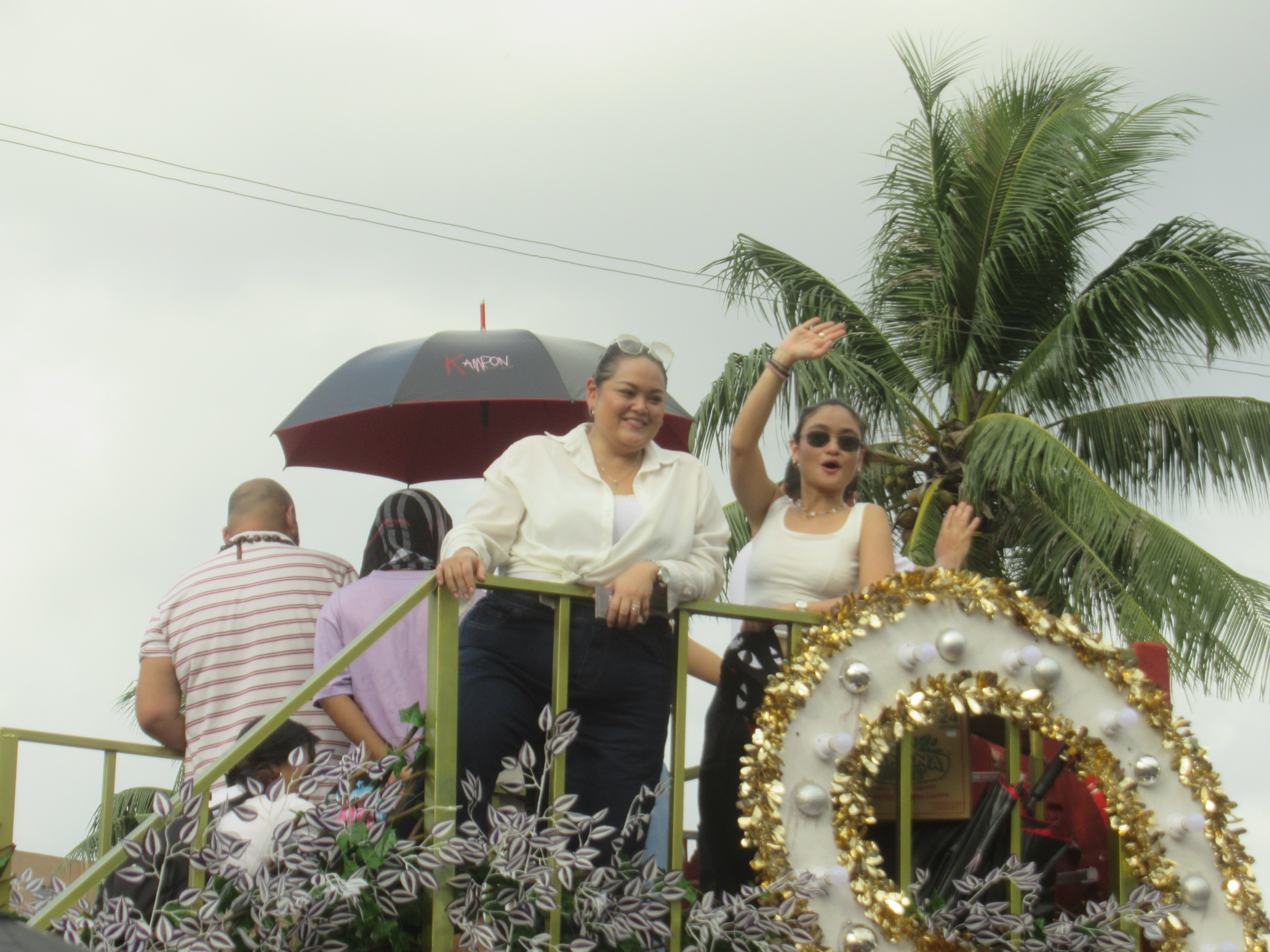
Zeinab Harake, Cai Cortez

== Accolades ==
Accolades received by Kampon
Award	Date of ceremony	Category	Recipient(s)	Result	Ref.
2023 Metro Manila Film Festival	December 27, 2023	Best Actor	Derek Ramsay	Nominated	
2023 Metro Manila Film Festival	December 27, 2023	Best Actress	Beauty Gonzalez	Nominated	
2023 Metro Manila Film Festival	December 27, 2023	Best Screenplay	Dodo Dayao	Nominated	
2023 Metro Manila Film Festival	December 27, 2023	Best Cinematography	Kara Moreno	Nominated	
2023 Metro Manila Film Festival	December 27, 2023	Best Editing	Benjamin Tolentino	Won	
2023 Metro Manila Film Festival	December 27, 2023	Best Sound	Albert Michael Idioma, Jannina Mikaela Minglanilla	Nominated	
2023 Metro Manila Film Festival	December 27, 2023	Best Visual Effects	John Kenneth Paclibar	Nominated	
2023 Metro Manila Film Festival	December 27, 2023	Best Child Performer	Erin Espiritu	Nominated	
Queens World Film Festival	April 30, 2024	Best International Narrative Feature	Kampon	Won	
