= 2023 Metro Manila Film Festival =

49th edition of Philippine festival

2023 Metro Manila Film Festival 49th Metro Manila Film Festival
- No. of films: 10
- Festival date: December 25, 2023 to January 14, 2024 (Note: The Festival was originally scheduled to end on January 7, 2024, but was given a one-week extension due to extreme demand and the gross receipts exceeded ₱1 billion.)

MMFF chronology
- 50th ed. 48th ed.

The 2023 Metro Manila Film Festival (MMFF) is the 49th edition of the annual Metro Manila Film Festival. During the festival, no foreign films are shown in Philippine theaters (excluding IMAX and 4D theaters). (Note: Includes Aquaman and the Lost Kingdom and Wonka)

== Entries ==
=== Feature films ===
The first four official entries were announced in July 2023, selected from 26 scripts submitted by 32 production companies.

The festival's selection committee usually chooses eight entries in total, but in October 2023 a second batch of six entries were announced, for a total of ten. After the fourth, fifth, and sixth highest-rated submissions all received the same score, 93.3%, the committee decided not to break the tie, according to its chairman, Jesse Ejercito. There were 30 finished films submitted, the highest number to date.

Most entries were given the Parental Guidance rating by the Movie and Television Review and Classification Board. Penduko and the Family of Two were deemed fitted for a general audience while the film festival's two horror films Kampon and Mallari where given the R-13 rating.

Title	Starring	Production company	Director	Genre
First batch
Family of Two	Sharon Cuneta, Alden Richards	Cineko Productions Inc., Myriad Entertainment	Nuel Naval	Drama, Family
Kampon	Beauty Gonzalez, Derek Ramsay	Quantum Films, Brightlight Productions, OctoArts Films	King Palisoc	Horror, Thriller
Penduko	Matteo Guidicelli, Kylie Verzosa	Sari Sari Network Films, Viva Films, Studio Viva and MQuest Ventures	Jason Paul Laxamana	Superhero
Rewind	Marian Rivera, Dingdong Dantes	ABS-CBN Film Productions, AgostoDos Pictures and APT Entertainment	Mae Cruz-Alviar	Romance, Drama
Second batch
Becky & Badette	Eugene Domingo, Pokwang	The IdeaFirst Company, Octoberian Films	Jun Robles Lana	Comedy
Broken Hearts Trip	Christian Bables, Jaclyn Jose	BMC Films	Lemuel C. Lorca	Comedy, Drama
Firefly	Alessandra de Rossi, Euwenn Mikaell	GMA Pictures, GMA Public Affairs	Zig Dulay	Fantasy, Drama
GomBurZa	Dante Rivero, Cedrick Juan, Enchong Dee, Piolo Pascual	Jesuit Communications, MQuest Ventures, CMB Film Services	Pepe Diokno	Historical, Biopic
Mallari	Piolo Pascual, Janella Salvador	Mentorque Productions	Derick Cabrido	Horror, Thriller
When I Met You in Tokyo	Vilma Santos, Christopher de Leon	JG Productions	Rado Peru, Rommel Penesa	Romance, Drama

== Parade of Stars ==
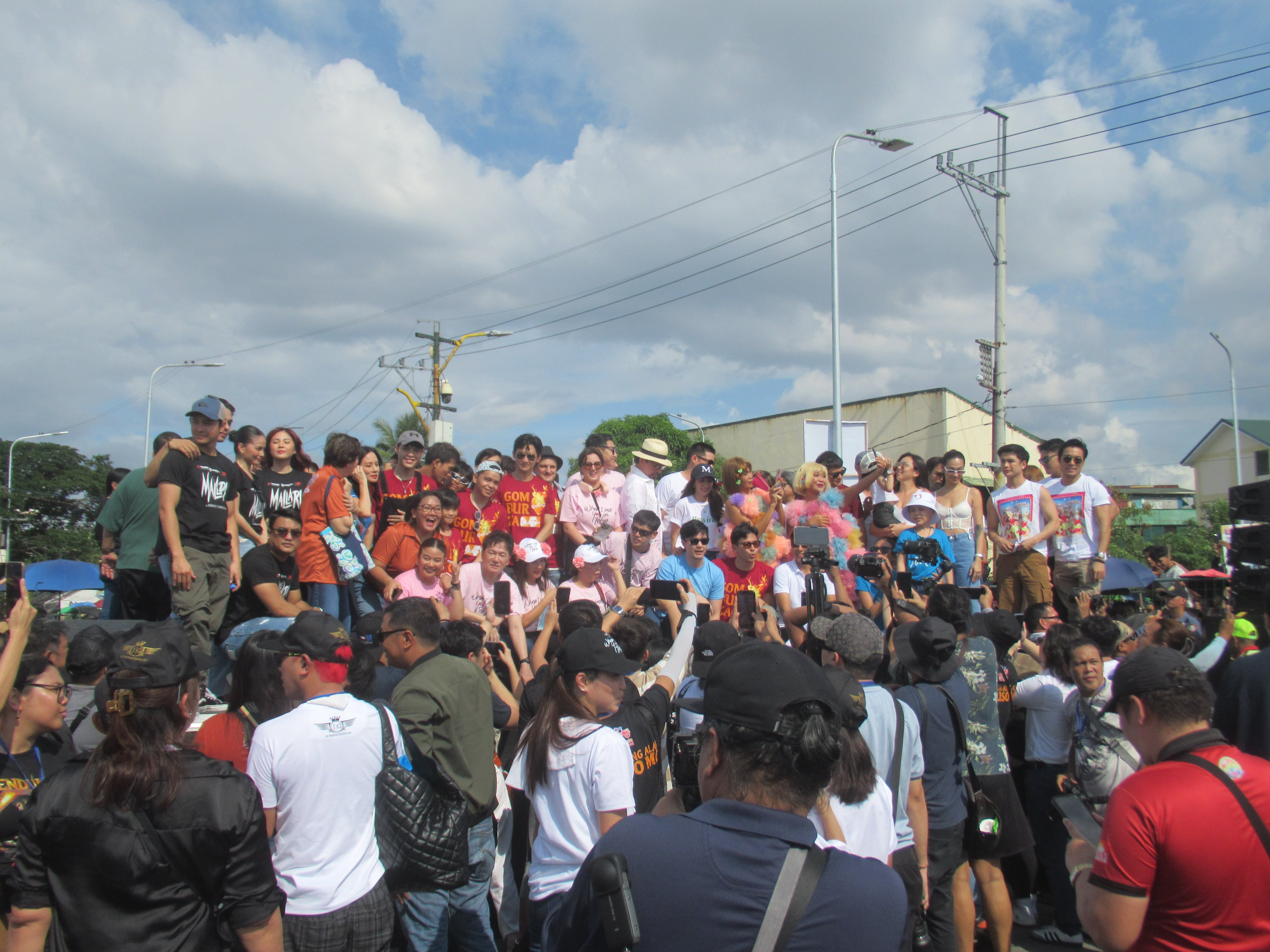
Casts of the film festival's entry films at the Parade of Stars in Navotas

The Parade of Stars took place on December 16, 2023. The annual parade passed through in four key cities of CAMANAVA area, first time in the history of the festival. The parade began at the Navotas Centennial Park and ended at Valenzuela People's Park. The route had a length of 8.77 kilometers (5.45 mi). The casts of all ten participating films joined the motorcade.

Euwenn Mikaell joined the parade for the float of Firefly following his attending the Christmas event of Iglesia ni Cristo Bulacan District.

== Awards ==
2023 Metro Manila Film Festival Gabi ng Parangal
- Date: December 27, 2023
- Site: New Frontier Theater, Quezon City
- Hosted by: Giselle Sanchez and Eisel Serrano

Highlights
- Best Picture: Firefly
- Best Director: Pepe Diokno (GomBurZa)
- Best Actor: Cedrick Juan (GomBurZa)
- Best Actress: Vilma Santos (When I Met You in Tokyo)
- Most awards: GomBurZa (7)

Television coverage
- Channel: One PH
- Network: TV5

The Gabi ng Parangal (transl. Awards Night) of the 2023 Metro Manila Film Festival was held at the New Frontier Theater in Quezon City on December 27, 2023. The ceremony was hosted by Giselle Sanchez and Eisel Serrano. The program was broadcast live at One PH of Cignal TV. GomBurZa received the most awards.

The board of jurors who determined the winners are led by director Chito S. Roño and actress Lorna Tolentino as chairpersons.

=== Major awards ===
Winners are listed first, highlighted in boldface, and indicated with a double dagger (‡). Nominations are also listed if applicable.

For this edition, four films were given Best Picture awards due to the festival having ten official entries.

Best Picture	Best Director
**Firefly – GMA Pictures**‡; GomBurZa – Jesuit Communications Foundation, MQuest Ventures, CMB Film Services (2nd Best Picture); Mallari – Mentorque Productions (3rd Best Picture); When I Met You In Tokyo – JG Productions (4th Best Picture)	**Pepe Diokno – GomBurZa**‡; Zig Dulay – Firefly; Jun Lana – Becky & Badette; Mae Cruz-Alviar – Rewind; Derick Cabrido – Mallari; Rado Peru, Rommel Peneza – When I Met You In Tokyo
Best Actor	Best Actress
**Cedrick Juan – GomBurZa**‡; Alden Richards – Family of Two; Dingdong Dantes – Rewind; Derek Ramsay – Kampon; Piolo Pascual – Mallari; Christopher de Leon – When I Met You in Tokyo	**Vilma Santos – When I Met You in Tokyo**‡; Eugene Domingo – Becky and Badette; Pokwang – Becky and Badette; Sharon Cuneta – Family of Two; Beauty Gonzalez – Kampon; Marian Rivera – Rewind
Best Supporting Actor	Best Supporting Actress
**JC Santos – Mallari**‡; Romnick Sarmenta – Becky & Badette; Dingdong Dantes – Firefly; Epi Quizon – Firefly; Enchong Dee – GomBurZa; Dante Rivero – GomBurZa; Pepe Herrera – Rewind; Tommy Alejandrino – Mallari	**Miles Ocampo – Family of Two**‡; Alessandra de Rossi – Firefly; Agot Isidro – Becky & Badette; Gloria Diaz – Mallari; Janella Salvador – Mallari
Best Screenplay	Best Cinematography
**Angeli Atienza – Firefly**‡; Rodolfo Vera and Pepe Diokno – GomBurZa; Dodo Dayao – Kampon; Jun Lana – Becky and Badette; Enrico Santos – Mallari; Suzette Doctolero – When I Met You in Tokyo	**Carlo Mendoza – GomBurZa**‡; Kara Moreno – Becky and Badette; Kara Moreno – Kampon; Neil Daza – Firefly; Neil Daza – Rewind; Juan Lorenzo Orendain – Mallari; Shayne Sarte – When I Met You in Tokyo
Best Production Design	Best Editing
**Ericson Navarro – GomBurZa**‡; Mariel Hizon – Mallari; Jaylo Conanan – Becky and Badette; Ericson Navarro – Penduko; Kenneth Villanueva – Firefly	**Benjamin Tolentino – Kampon**‡; Benjamin Tolentino – Becky and Badette; Benjamin Tolentino – GomBurZa; Noel Tonga and Nelson Villamayor – Mallari; Marya Ignacio – Rewind; Froilan Francia – When I Met You in Tokyo
Best Sound	Best Original Theme Song
**Melvin Rivera and Louie Boy Bauson – GomBurZa**‡; Armand de Guzman – Becky and Badette; Albert Michael Idioma and Jannina Mikaela Minglanilla– Kampon; Immanuel Verona and Nerrika Salim– Mallari; Aian Louie Caro – Family of Two	**"Finggah Lickin" from Becky & Badette – by Eugene Domingo**‡; "Sa Duyan Ng Bayan" from GomBurZa – by Ebe Dancel, Gloc 9, and Noel Cabangon; "Sa Yakap Mo" from Family of Two – by Iyah Ladip-Guanzon and Ralph Padiernos; "O Paru Paro" from Kampon; "Dagundong" from Penduko – by Alamat; "Pag-ibig Sa Sumpa" from Mallari – by Juan Karlos
Best Musical Score	Best Visual Effects
**Von de Guzman – Mallari**‡; Tessa Barrozo – Becky and Badette; Jessie Lazaten – When I Met You in Tokyo; Francis Concio – Rewind; Len Calvo – Firefly	**Gaspar Mangalin – Mallari**‡; Reality MM Studios – Firefly; Brian Galagnara, Danilo Handog, John Kenneth Paclibar – GomBurZa; John Kenneth Paclibar – Kampon; Gerwin Meneses – Penduko
Best Child Performer	Gatpuno Antonio J. Villegas Cultural Award
**Euwenn Mikaell – Firefly**‡; Jordan Lim – Rewind; Erin Espiritu – Kampon	**GomBurZa**‡; Firefly; Mallari
Fernando Poe Jr. Memorial Award for Excellence	Best Float
**When I Met You in Tokyo**‡; Becky and Badette; Firefly; Rewind; Family of Two; Penduko	**When I Met You in Tokyo**‡
Gender Sensitivity Award	
**Becky & Badette**‡; Broken Heart's Trip; Firefly; Family of Two; When I Met You in Tokyo	

=== Other awards ===
- Manay Ichu Vera-Perez Maceda Memorial Award – Lily Monteverde

=== Multiple awards ===
Awards	Film
7	GomBurZa
4	Mallari
4	When I Met You in Tokyo
3	Firefly
2	Becky & Badette

=== Multiple nominations ===
Awards	Film
16	Mallari
14	Becky & Badette
14	Firefly
12	GomBurZa
11	When I Met You in Tokyo
9	Kampon
9	Rewind
7	Family of Two
4	Penduko

== Box office ==
The combined box office gross for the films of the festival had surpassed ₱700 million by January 2, 2024, and ₱1 billion five days later. Rewind reportedly is the top earning film. Rewind ranked 1st while the next three are Mallari ranked 2nd, Firefly ranked 3rd, and GomBurZa ranked 4th in the box office sales.

== Other events ==
=== MMMF Auditorium inauguration ===
On December 14, 2023, the 152-seater MMFF Auditorium located at the MMDA Building in Pasig was inaugurated.

=== 2024 Manila International Film Festival ===
2024 Manila International Film Festival
- Date: January 29 – February 2, 2024 (Festival dates); February 2, 2024 (Award Gala)
- Site: Directors Guild of America, Los Angeles, U.S. (Award Gala)

Highlights
- Best Picture: Firefly
- Best Director: Zig Dulay (Firefly)
- Best Actor: Piolo Pascual and Dingdong Dantes (Mallari and Rewind)
- Best Actress: Vilma Santos (When I Met You in Tokyo)
- Most awards: Firefly (4)

The inaugural edition of the Manila International Film Festival (MIFF) took place in the United States from January 29 to February 2, 2024 and will feature the entry films of the 2023 MMFF. The MIFF took place at the TCL Chinese Theater in Hollywood, Los Angeles and the Directors Guild of America on Sunset Boulevard.

Awards

The Award Gala was held at the Directors Guild of America in Los Angeles on February 2, 2024.

- Best Picture – Firefly
- 2nd Best Picture – GomBurZa
- Best Director – Zig Dulay (Firefly)
- Best Actors – Piolo Pascual (Mallari) and Dingdong Dantes (Rewind)
- Best Actress – Vilma Santos (When I Met You in Tokyo)
- Best Supporting Actor – Pepe Herrera (Rewind)
- Best Supporting Actress – Alessandra de Rossi (Firefly)
- Best Screenplay – Angeli Atienza (Firefly)
- Best Cinematography – Carlo Mendoza (GomBurZa)
- Lifetime Achievement Award – Hilda Koronel
- Special Jury Prize – Becky & Badette
- Audience Choice Award – GomBurZa
- Trailblazer Awards – Romando Artes, Rochelle Ona, and Mark Dacascos

== Gallery ==
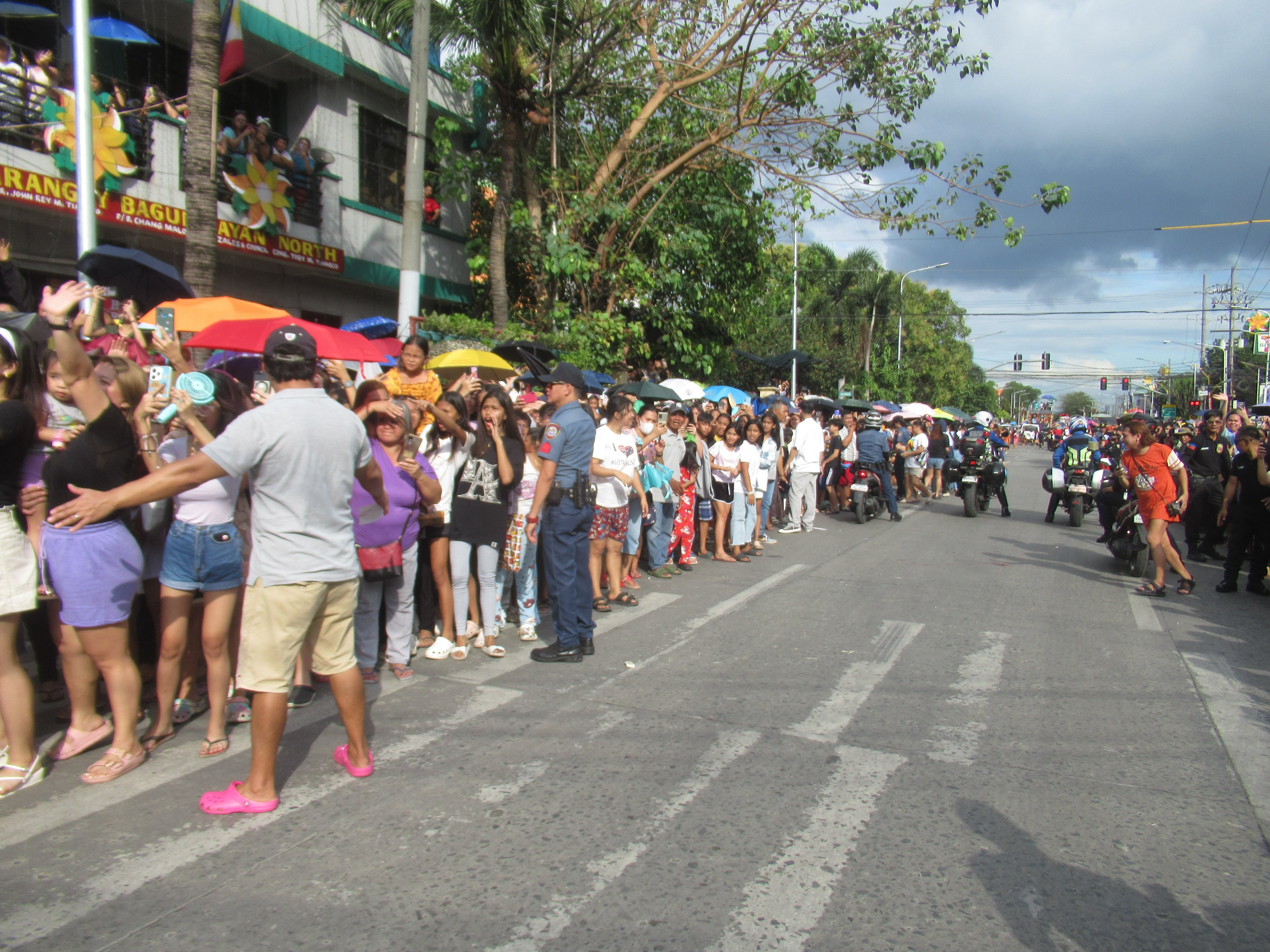
Navotas crowds, Parade of Stars

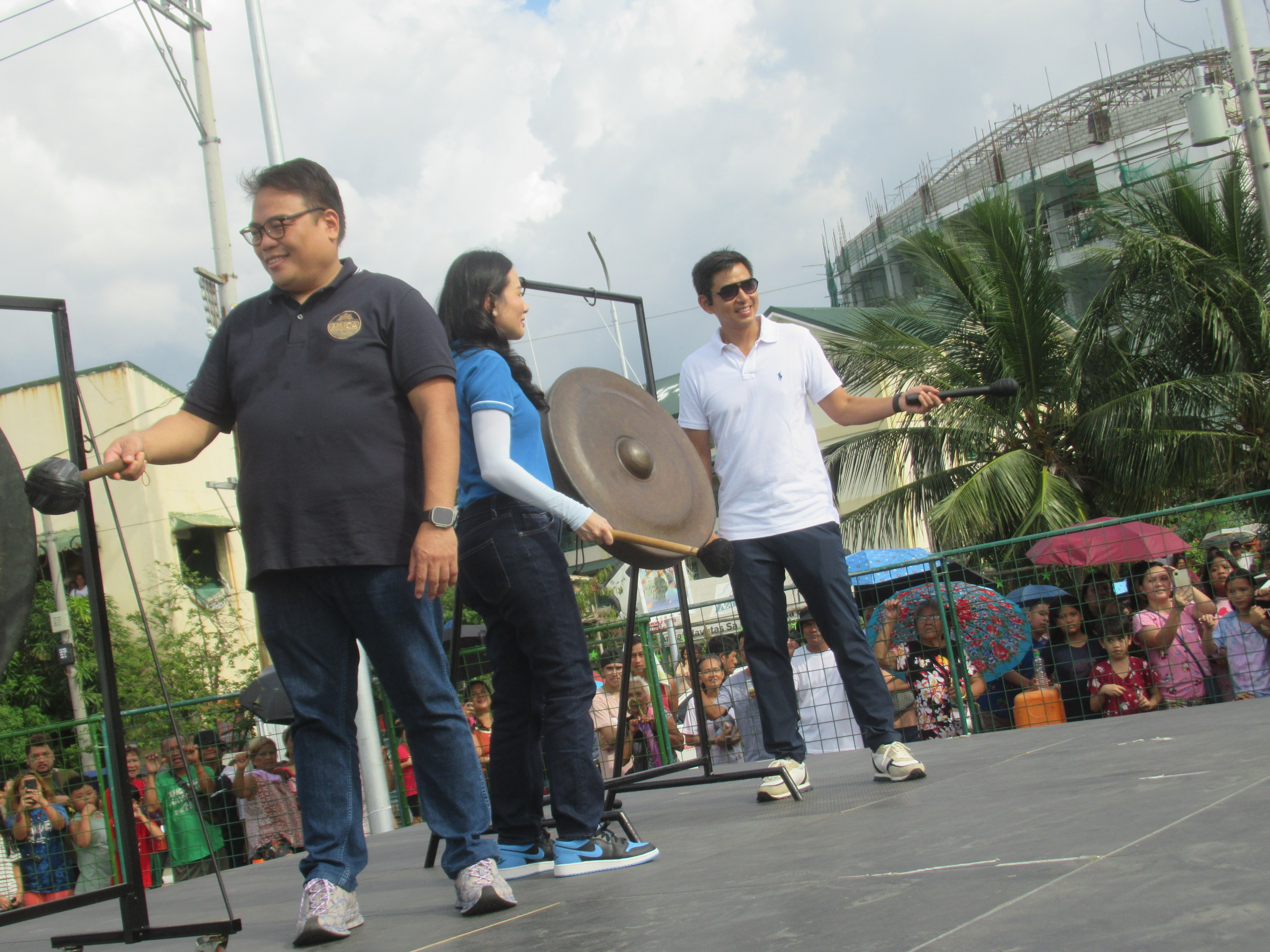
MMDA Chair Romando S. Artes, Navotas Mayor John Rey Tiangco and Malabon Mayor Jeannie Sandoval

== Notes ==
Preceded by 2022 Metro Manila Film Festival	Metro Manila Film Festival; 2023	Succeeded by 2024 Metro Manila Film Festival
