= Juan Severino Mallari =

Filipino serial killer (1785–1840)

- Born: September 22, 1785; San Nicolas, Pampanga, Captaincy General of the Philippines, Spanish Empire
- Died: 1840 (aged 54–55); Manila, Captaincy General of the Philippines, Spanish Empire
- Cause of death: Execution by hanging
- Occupation: Catholic priest
- Status: Executed
- Motive: To dispel an alleged curse on his ailing mother

Details
- Victims: 57 (as confessed)
- Span of crimes: 1816–1826
- Locations: Pampanga, Captaincy General of the Philippines
- Weapon: Knife

Juan Severino Mallari (September 22, 1785 – 1840) was a Filipino Catholic priest and serial killer. He is the first documented serial killer from the Philippines. During the Spanish colonial period, Mallari served as a parish priest in Magalang, Pampanga. He reportedly killed 57 people in the area before he was discovered, arrested, imprisoned and hanged in 1840.

== Early life and career ==
Mallari was from San Nicolas, Pampanga (present-day Macabebe, Pampanga). He studied theology at the University of Santo Tomas and completed his studies in 1809, after which he was ordained and became the coadjutor in Gapan, Lubao, and Bacolor. He then vied for the position of parish priest in several areas, namely Orani, Mariveles, Lubao and in the Port of Cavite as a chaplain, but was consistently rejected.

During this period, Mallari also pursued calligraphy, earning him the recognition of being the second Filipino calligraphic artist-priest, after Fr. Mariano Hipolito. As a parish priest, he was known for decorating annual reports with flowers, vines and angels on clouds.

== Murders ==
Mallari served as the parish priest of Magalang, Pampanga based in the San Bartolome Church from 1816 to 1826, becoming the first Filipino to become a parish priest in the province. It was during this period that he started believing his mother was cursed, which became his motive for killing. He believed killing people could cure his mother's ailments. It is also plausible that around this time, Mallari's peers noticed signs of the priest's mental instability.

Mallari was attributed with the deaths of at least 57 people during that time. The bodies of the victims were found in different areas, which prevented authorities from finding a motive or connection to the murders.

== Discovery, imprisonment, and execution ==
Mallari contracted an unknown illness sometime in 1826, which led to an attending priest who looked after Mallari finding the blood-stained personal belongings of his victims in his home. After his involvement in the murders was revealed, Mallari was imprisoned for 14 years. However, Dr. Luciano Santiago argued the priest should have been sent to the first mental health institution in the Philippines instead. Santiago might have been referring to either Hospicio de San Jose or San Lazaro Hospital.

In 1840, the Spanish colonial government executed Mallari by hanging.

== In popular culture ==
A re-imagined version of Mallari was portrayed by Piolo Pascual in the 2023 film Mallari. Meanwhile, a television series Severino starring Dennis Trillo as Mallari by a co-production of studios from the Philippines, Japan, Singapore and Slovenia was slated for a 2025 release.

== See also ==
- List of serial killers by country
