= Metro Manila Film Festival Award for Most Gender-Sensitive Film =

Annual Philippine film award

- Awarded for: Best in raising awareness of gender equality concerns
- Country: Philippines
- Presented by: MMDA
- First award: 2003
- Currently held by: Call Me Mother, (2025)
- Website: www.mmda.gov.ph/mmff/

The Metro Manila Film Festival Award for Most Gender-Sensitive Film is an award presented annually by the Metropolitan Manila Development Authority (MMDA). It was first awarded at the 29th Metro Manila Film Festival ceremony, held in 2003; the film Homecoming won the award and it is given to the best representation of gender-sensitivity or modification of behavior by raising awareness of gender equality concerns in a motion picture. Currently, nominees and winners are determined by Executive Committees, headed by the Metropolitan Manila Development Authority Chairman and key members of the film industry. The award was not presented from 2014 to 2018 until it was accepted by Mindanao on the 45th Metro Manila Film Festival.

== Winners and nominees ==
=== 2000s ===
Year	Film	Ref
2003 (29th)	Homecoming	
2004 (30th)	Aishite Imasu 1941: Mahal Kita	
2005 (31st)	Blue Moon	
2006 (32nd)	Kasal, Kasali, Kasalo	
2007 (33rd)	Desperadas	
2008 (34th)	Baler	
2009 (35th)	Mano Po 6: A Mother's Love	

=== 2010s ===
Year	Film	Ref
2010 (36th)	Ang Tanging Ina Mo (Last na 'To!)	
2011 (37th)	My Househusband (Ikaw Na!)	
2012 (38th)	Thy Womb	
2013 (39th)	Girl, Boy, Bakla, Tomboy	
No Gender Sensitivity Award from 2014 to 2018.
2019 (45th)	Mindanao	

=== 2020s ===
Year	Film	Ref
2020 (46th)	The Boy Foretold by the Stars	
2021 (47th)	Big Night!	
2022 (48th)	My Teacher	
2023 (49th)	Becky and Badette	
2024 (50th)	And the Breadwinner Is...	
2025 (51st)	Call Me Mother	
