= The Last Beergin =

The Last BeerGin
- Theatrical release poster
- Directed by: Nuel C. Naval
- Written by: Mel Mendoza-Del Rosario
- Starring: Cherry Pie Picache; JC Santos; Pepe Herrera; Zaijian Jaranilla; Xyriel Manabat
- Cinematography: Mo Zee
- Edited by: Beng Bandong
- Music by: Mikey Amistoso; Jazz Nicolas
- Production companies: Cineko Productions; Obra Cinema
- Distributed by: Cineko Productions
- Release date: October 1, 2025
- Running time: 92 minutes
- Country: Philippines
- Language: Filipino

The Last Beergin (stylized in all caps) is a 2025 Philippine comedy drama film written by Mel Mendoza-Del Rosario and directed by Nuel C. Naval. It stars Cherry Pie Picache, JC Santos, Pepe Herrera, Zaijian Jaranilla and Xyriel Manabat. The film is the fourth film of director Nuel Naval and screenwriter Mel Mendoza-del Rosario together after Miracle in Cell No. 7, Family Matters and Family of Two.

== Cast ==
- Cherry Pie Picache as Tere
- JC Santos as RG
- Pepe Herrera as Hilario/Hilo
- Zaijian Jaranilla as Isaac
- Xyriel Manabat as Sandy
- Minnie Aguilar as Aling Nori
- Soliman Cruz as Tere's Husband
- Mercedes Cabral as Hilo's Wife
- Nikki Valdez as Sandy's Mom
- Ketchup Eusebio as Sandy's Dad
- Temi Abad as Convenient Store Cashier
- Jojit Lorenzo as Road Rage Driver
- Miggy Jimenez as Jun
- Mischa Clark as Convenient Store Staff
- Resa Nepomuceno as Convenient Store Staff
- Paula Biluan as Customer
- Carl Barreiro as Pickpocket
- EJ Barreiro as Pickpocket
- Robert Sanchez as Tanod
- Angel Benjamin as Eatery Tindera

== Release ==
The film was theatrically released on October 1, 2025, under Cineko Productions.

== Reception ==
Nazamel Tabares of Pelikula Mania gave the film a 4 out of 5 rating and wrote; The challenge in making a film that is set within 24 hours is to keep the audience engaged from start to finish through just the conversations, and that’s what Nuel Naval’s ‘The Last Beergin’ did. Having a good script and great actors, it was probably easy for Nuval to direct the film.

Mell T. Navarro of Tempo gave the film a positive feedback and wrote (translated in English); We're not just laughed, we also cried in the other scenes, skillfully performed by the ensemble cast.
