= Zaijian Jaranilla =

Filipino actor (born 2001)

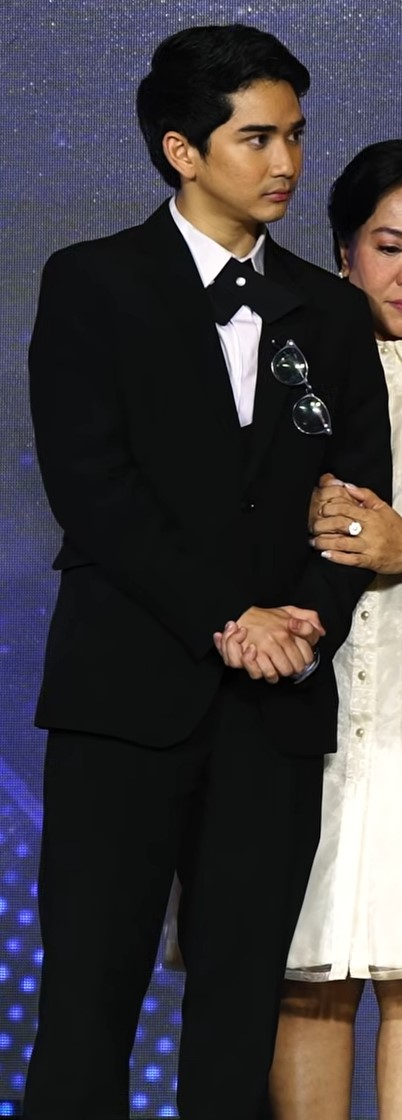
- Jaranilla at Metro Manila Film Festival Gabi ng Parangal 2025
- Born: Zaijian Godsick Lara Jaranilla; August 23, 2001 (age 25); Gloria, Oriental Mindoro, Philippines
- Occupations: Actor; model
- Years active: 2004–present
- Agent(s): RDB Talents and Events Management (2004–present); ABS-CBN Corporation (2008–present) (Note: Primary allegiance media company under Star Magic. Later has a partnership with ZOE Broadcasting Network (A2Z) (2020–present; blocktime agreement), Advanced Media Broadcasting System (All TV) (2024–present; content partnership that evolved to brand licensing on December 17, 2025, and Amazon Prime Video (2026–present; ABS-CBN-produced series only)) and Kapamilya Channel's (which replaced the company's main ABS-CBN terrestrial channel) video-on-demand counterpart Kapamilya Online Live (2020–present) following the shutdown of its free-to-air TV network. Kapamilya Channel, Kapamilya Online Live, and All TV added the ABS-CBN branding by having its 2013 logo together with the respective logos on March 16, 2026.); GMA Network (2010–2011; 2019; 2025–present) (Note: Secondary allegiance media company conditionally and concurrently from December 2010 with the announcement of Most Favorite Child Personality for May Bukas Pa at the 2010 Lingkod TV Awards in 24 Oras, again for the second four months later in April 2011 for the promotion of Pak! Pak! My Dr. Kwak! on Eat Bulaga!, third in 2019 with StarStruck to promote Shayne Sava, and fourth time and more commonly since 2025 due to the collaboration of his primary media company ABS-CBN with GMA that began three years earlier in 2022.); Viva Entertainment (2019) (Note: For "Heto Na Naman" with Hannah Magdales only which was released by Viva Records.); TV5 Network (2021–present) (Note: Secondary allegiance media company conditionally and concurrently due to the collaboration of ABS-CBN with TV5 since January 24, 2021 for airing of ABS-CBN-produced media on the network, and TV5 events and show appearances.); Freelancer (2024–present) (Note: Indie series and films not produced or aired by any of the three Philippine major media companies (ABS-CBN, GMA, and TV5) starting with Guryon.); Progressive Broadcasting Corporation and Solar Entertainment (2026) (Note: Only on WishDate: Unchanging Glass of Wish 107.5 and 2 Valid IDs, respectively.)
- Notable work: May Bukas Pa
- Television: ABS-CBN (Kapamilya Channel, Kapamilya Online Live, A2Z, and All TV); GMA Network (Kapuso Stream); TV5 (Kapatid Livestream); Amazon Prime Video
- Height: 1.57 m (5 ft 2 in)
- Relatives: Zymic Jaranilla (brother)
- Website: Facebook page

Zaijian Godsick Lara Jaranilla (born August 23, 2001) is a Filipino actor and model. He began his career as a model before transitioning into show business actor both as child performer. He rose to fame for his role as Santino in the Christian drama series, May Bukas Pa.

== Early life and education ==
Zaijian Godsick Lara Jaranilla was born on August 23, 2001, in Gloria, Oriental Mindoro, to Glendelle Lara Jaranilla and Zenon Louis Jaranilla and grew up in Quezon City, Metro Manila, being the eldest of the three siblings with fellow actor Zymic Jaranilla is part of the family. Due to the separation of his mother from the family in 2006, Jaranilla mostly spends living with the Atayde family since the peak of his breakthrough drama series May Bukas Pa in 2009, and vacations locally in Boac, Marinduque and Nasipit, Agusan del Norte and internationally abroad starting with his 8th birthday at Hong Kong Disneyland in 2009 and then began to travel to visa countries in 2019 with South Korea while continuing to return to his own family outside the latter at certain intervals.

He began his formal education at General Roxas Elementary School in Quezon City. He was scheduled to enroll at Angelicum College for the second grade, but due to media commitments, he temporarily continued his education through homeschooling and programs for gifted students at Headway School for Giftedness also in the same city before resuming regular schooling at Angelicum in 2010 where he remained there for eight years and completing his sophomore year of junior high school in 2018.

Because of his increasing professional commitments, he discontinued regular schooling after completing the sophomore year. To continue his education, he took and passed the Philippine Educational Placement Test (PEPT) administered by the Department of Education, which allowed him to proceed directly to senior high school. In 2023, Jaranilla completed his studies in Humanities and Social Sciences (HUMSS) strand at Colegio de San Juan de Dios in San Rafael, Bulacan.

== Career ==
=== 2004–2008: Start of overall performance career as child performer and model ===
Jaranilla was discovered by talent manager Bryan Ancheta of RDB Talents and Events Management in 2004, marking his debut in the overall performance industry as a child performer. His grandmother, Maria Dulce Jaranilla, who worked with the Philippine Obstetrical and Gynecological Society Foundation, Inc., accompanied him after a doctor expressed interest in having him appear in commercials.

He made his first appearance in the McDonald's Good Kuya/Tweens commercial in 2006, playing the role as Paolo, a younger brother of Carlo Lacana who accused of drawing of the latter's assignment, later grabs a toy from Lacana until their mother stopped him from grabbing, and playing around using the said toy afterwards. This was followed by a Lactum MTV (With Supers) commercial in 2007, and a TV ad for Tide in 2008. Together, they went to an audition in Makati, which proved successful.

=== 2008–present: Showbiz career with allegiances at Philippine media companies and freelancing at indie productions ===
Jaranilla then joined showbiz sector after four years as a performer in 2008 upon signing with ABS-CBN Corporation as his primary media company allegiance under Star Magic while also allowing to have secondary allegiance with other companies by having him work with and appear on them conditionally and concurrently through an agreement and permission between both parties which began two years later in December 2010 which obtained him an actor status. Actors that he worked or shown support with outside ABS-CBN initially as a child performer are the hosts of Eat Bulaga! including Tito Sotto, Vic Sotto, Joey de Leon and Ryan Agoncillo who is the final guest cast on his breakthrough drama May Bukas Pa.

Jaranilla became a regular performer on the Sunday variety show ASAP and made several appearances on ABS-CBN, GMA Network, and TV5 programs, with initially as child performer which are It's Showtime, ABS-CBN Christmas Special, Maalaala Mo Kaya, Eat Bulaga!, Minute to Win It, The Singing Bee, and Kapamilya, Deal or No Deal, with the first four mentioned were carried over throughout his teen and adult performer era.

==== 2008–present: ABS-CBN as primary media company allegiance ====
After being signed at ABS-CBN under Star Magic as primary allegiance, he made his first ABS-CBN and showbiz appearance as a guest on the children's sketch comedy show Goin' Bulilit. That same year, he also appeared in the anthology series Mars Ravelo's Komiks Presents.

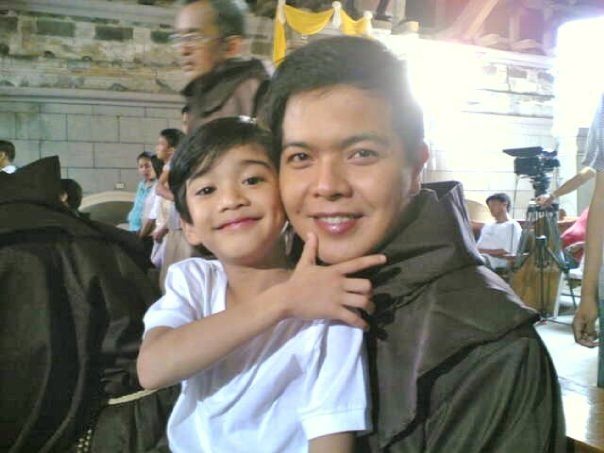
Jaranilla (left, as a child performer) with Andre Tiangco in May Bukas Pa.

Jaranilla portrayed the lead role of Santino Guillermo in May Bukas Pa, the highest-rated Philippine television program of all time and was announced on late 2008. His portrayal of Santino, a young boy who encounters Jesus Christ, earned him widespread recognition and made him a household name in the Philippines. The series marked the debut of his signature praying and bowing pose both on working showbiz and non-working personal and family life. The series and its cast, including Jaranilla, received various awards and accolades.

In 2010, Jaranilla voiced the character Otep, a fish, in Agua Bendita, the immediate successor to May Bukas Pa, another religious-themed series, and predecessor to the fantasy-adventure drama Noah in post-TV Patrol timeslot until the latter's premiere in July 2010. Noah, alongside Piolo Pascual and Jodi Sta. Maria, replaced Agua Bendita in its timeslot when it moved to the second primetime slot, aired between the original cut and extended versions of May Bukas Pa, and lasted until February 4, 2011. For his role as Eli/Jacob Perez in Noah, Jaranilla wore a wig starting in June 2010 to portray longer hair, which he kept until July 2011, five months after the series' end. Later that year, he voiced the character Nico in RPG Metanoia, his first animated film.

ABS-CBN aired two specials in connection to Pope John Paul II leading to sainthood, with the first being which are Banál on May 22, 2011, where Jaranilla reprised his role as Santino to narrate about his beatification and then cumulated with the canonization three years later and after the December 5, 2013 end of extended version of May Bukas Pa on April 27, 2014, named John Paul II and John XXIII Mga Bagong Santo: The ABS-CBN News Special Coverage with it reported on TV Patrol Weekend that followed. Jaranilla and Jaime Fabregas, who portrayed Father Anthony, presented the life of Pope John Paul II and his significance for Filipinos on the former. On November of that year, he appeared in the Christmas-themed TV series Ikaw ay Pag-Ibig alongside fellow child stars Mutya Orquia, Louise Abuel, and Manabat. The series aired until January 2012.

In 2012, Jaranilla took on the lead role in the melodrama series Lorenzo's Time, alongside Carmina Villarroel. He portrayed the titular character, a boy with progeria. Members of the production staff described Jaranilla as a "boy wonder" and referred to him as a natural and a "born actor" on set.

In 2013, he starred in the TV series Juan dela Cruz as Tonton. His character Tonton was a juvenile and young aswang. Jaranilla also portrayed the role of Brian in the Maalaala Mo Kaya episode, Alitaptap.

In March 2014, Jaranilla also appeared in the TV series Ikaw Lamang as Young Samuel Severino, the younger version of Coco Martin's character, marking a brief reunion with Martin after their time together in Juan dela Cruz.

He starred in Hawak-Kamay as Raymond "Emong" Agustin in July 2014. Jaranilla turned 13 during the production of the series, officially marking his transition into a teenage actor. This marked Hawak-Kamay as the first series he worked on as a teen performer.

In November 2014, Jaranilla expressed interest in taking on more teen-oriented roles following his work in the family drama Hawak Kamay. He stated that he was ready to accept more mature projects offered by ABS-CBN.

In 2015, he appeared in several episodes of Maalaala Mo Kaya. That same year, he starred in the film Hamog, playing Rashid, a Muslim boy who spends 48 hours trying to seek help for his Christian friend who died under tragic circumstances. Hamog was one of the 12 official entries in the Pista ng Pelikulang Pilipino (PPP). Jaranilla's performance received critical praise, and the film won the Outstanding Artistic Achievement Golden Goblet Award at the 2016 Shanghai International Film Festival. His role also earned him his first Best Actor nomination at the Cinema One Originals Awards. Hamog was also screened at the 15th New York Asian Film Festival. In the same period, Jaranilla returned to television with a minor role in FPJ's Ang Probinsyano as Cocoy Amaba, marking his third reunion with Martin. He also appeared as Young Macoy in the television drama-romantic series, The Story of Us, in early 2016.

In 2018, Jaranilla appeared in Bagani, portraying Liksi, and starred alongside Liza Soberano and Enrique Gil. In 2019, he acted in his first digital series, Story of My Life, produced by Big Reveal Digital and streamed on iWantTV. Jaranilla also joined the list of Filipino guest actors in the American crime drama Almost Paradise, appearing in the episode titled Lone Wolf. He later starred in Ang sa Iyo ay Akin.

Jaranilla returned to Bacolor Church in June 2019 as part of ABS-CBN's year-long 65th anniversary celebration. The 2009–2010 Christmas ID Star ng Pasko was used in two station IDs from the 2010s to 2020s: Ngayong Pasko Magniningning Ang Pilipino (lit. 'This Christmas, the Filipinos will Shine') (2010–2011), and Family is Forever (2019–2020). The 2010–2011 ID was linked to May Bukas Pa, which was the highest rating show on ABS-CBN for the period of February 2009 until Mara Clara on February 3, 2011. The 2019–2020 ID was part of the network's 65th anniversary from 2018 to 2019. Both featured Jaranilla, highlighting May Bukas Pa as the top-rated show on Philippine television since the nationwide TV ratings system was introduced in 2009. The Star ng Pasko ID remains notable since its release on November 4, 2009. It is his practice every year after the show's production ended on February 5, 2010, to film tour at the church.

"Zaijian Jaranilla marvels with his brilliance in taking his character not only understandable or comprehensible, but a real person with whom viewers would share a deep emotional connection...He gave a performance that was deeply felt and riveting"

— Television critic Gerry Plaza on Jaranilla's performance in Maalaala Mo Kaya "Dialysis" episode (2021)

In 2020, Jaranilla expressed interest in portraying a gay character and had at least two films lined up. He took on the challenge of playing a gay character in the coming-of-age comedy Boyette: Not a Girl Yet, directed by Jumbo Albano and produced by Star Cinema. In an interview with ABS-CBN News, Jaranilla explained, "...I agreed to do the project because I wanted to change my image. I want people to know that I can portray different roles. Boyette has given me an opportunity to prove myself to people." He acknowledged that his breakout role as the orphan boy Santino in the 2009–2013 inspirational teleserye May Bukas Pa had a lasting impact on his image. However, he was able to move on from that role work-wise after the series ended its extended run on December 5, 2013, stating that all of the show's contents were already originally aired while keeping its characteristics in a long-term. Jaranilla emphasized that Boyette would give his fans the chance to see him in a different light both on working and viewing aspects.

In February 2020, Jaranilla was interviewed about the comparisons between his responses when he portrayed Santino and his answers as a grown-up and teenage actor in a segment titled "Same Interview, Ten Years Apart.".

While Jaranilla already had willingness to work on other media companies outside ABS-CBN especially after the shutdown of the latter's own free television due to broadcast franchise loss and its resulting collaborations from January 24, 2021 as part of his versatility, he repeatedly declared and clarified since May 5, 2020 and continued when he transitioned from teen to adult performer on August 23, 2021 that ABS-CBN under Star Magic still remains as his primary allegiance media company and not exchange that status to others as such his instances and experiences of working on other companies are only secondary and made conditionally. It was reflected three years later when he renewed his contract with ABS-CBN and Star Magic on November 15, 2023, alongside JM de Guzman, which continued their primary allegiance with the company and remaining under the said talent agency. ABS-CBN management consisting of chairman Martin López, president and CEO and ABS-CBN Studios executive producer Carlo Katigbak, CFO Ricardo B. Tan Jr. and ABS-CBN Studios and Star Magic head Laurenti Dyogi, and talent managers Cris B. Tapang and Portia Dimla were present at their contract signing.

In July 2021, he starred in the Maalaala Mo Kaya (MMK) 30th anniversary special, Loving 2 Care, in the episode titled "Dialysis", alongside Nonie Buencamino. Directed by Jerry Lopez-Sineneng, the episode featured Jaranilla portraying a nurse battling chronic kidney disease. His performance received generally positive reviews, with critics noting his maturity and growth as an actor.

In 2022, Jaranilla portrayed Gio Illustre in The Broken Marriage Vow, a remake of the British series Doctor Foster. This marked his first series role as an adult performer. He was awarded Best Actor in a Supporting Role at the Asian Academy Creative Awards for his performance in the series and represented the Philippines at the awards ceremony in December 2022. His portrayal in the series made him realize the importance of self-love.

Following The Broken Marriage Vow, Jaranilla was cast as Ding, the younger brother and sidekick to the titular Filipino character, Darna, from August 15, 2022, to February 10, 2023, in what became his biggest role to date. During the first week of the show, Jaranilla received praise from critics for his acting skills. As the series aired at 8:00 pm ABS-CBN primetime slot between the two long-running action series of Coco Martin which are Ang Probinsyano and Batang Quiapo, it marked his return as adult to the said and showbiz breakthrough timeslot that began with the cut version of May Bukas Pa 12–13 years earlier after eight years since Hawak Kamay when he was recently transitioned from child to teen performer.

From August 28, 2023, to August 30, 2024, Jaranilla reunited with Andrea Brillantes and Manabat to star in ABS-CBN's mystery thriller and youth drama duology, Senior High and High Street. He portrayed Tim Castro in the series, an initial boyfriend to Manabat's character, Roxy, and student, and later became a police officer. Jaranilla received critical and public praise for his performance.

In 2025, Jaranilla had two appearances on Rainbow Rumble, the first game show to have his appearance after the shutdown of ABS-CBN free-to-air television five years earlier in 2020 and as adult performer, on the episodes "Child Stars (Gen Z Child Stars)" and "Sylvia and Friends" (with the latter promoting I'mPerfect.

From January 18 to April 24, 2026, Jaranilla played the role of Matteo on The Silent Noise, with production from the said date of January to March 26, 2026, is part of his 3-months work, stay, and frequent return to Morong, Bataan and Zambales, as such, together with Pampanga (Angeles City), again highlighting those three provinces after 13–17 years with May Bukas Pa and Noah from February 2, 2009, to December 5, 2013, during his child performer period. While playing the role, he struggled with Filipino Sign Language (FSL) due to him first time on doing both in his life and 22 years in the working industry requiring assistance from their mentors FSL deaf instructors for practice to get the scene as one mistake will make production of those (or even the series) be cancelled not by the director Onat Diaz but by the instructors that the production staff has been collaborated to, as shown as he has only less lines to do so during the series' production. The blue carpet, premiere, and media conference of the series were made on March 10, 2026, at Gateway Mall Cinema 12 in Quezon City where many celebrities attended the event as well as the ABS-CBN management which are Carlo Katigbak and COO Cory Vidanes, and ABS-CBN Studios and Star Magic head Laurenti Dyogi. The private closing party consisting of the casts and crew, however, was held at Casablanca Hotel Condominium Resort and Vasco's Hotel and Restaurant in Subic Bay Freeport Zone in Olongapo, Zambales on March 25, 2026, just beside and near the boundary between Zambales (Olongapo City) and Bataan (Morong) which are two of the three provinces that served as the series' main production locations. The series was previewed at Where Stories Begin event in April 2026 at The Fifth at Rockwell in Makati.

==== 2010–present: Other media companies as secondary company allegiances ====
Being allowed to work and have appearances on other media companies through an agreement and permission of his primary company ABS-CBN with them, he appeared on GMA Network's 24 Oras at an announcement of Most Favorite Child Personality at the 2010 Lingkod TV Awards for May Bukas Pa on GMA Network's 24 Oras in December 2010. Four months later on April 23, 2011, he made his first on-screen film appearance on Pak! Pak! My Dr. Kwak!, the related film to May Bukas Pa, alongside Vic Sotto and Bea Alonzo, playing Angelito, an angel who was expelled from heaven. Jaranilla appeared on GMA's noontime show Eat Bulaga! to participate in the segment "Pinoy Henyo" alongside co-actors Xyriel Manabat and Bea Alonzo while promoting the movie. His appearances on 24 Oras and Eat Bulaga! marked the first appearance and working stint outside his primary ABS-CBN, respectively.

In July 2019, Jaranilla made his second working collaboration with GMA Network after eight years through a public service announcement supporting Shayne Sava of StarStruck. He encouraged fans to also support for her to become an Ultimate Female Survivor of the show.

Since the collaboration of ABS-CBN with other media companies since January 24, 2021 with TV5 following the shutdown of its free-to-air network, his secondary allegiance with other companies increased while retaining primary allegiance with ABS-CBN under Star Magic which continued to his adult performer era from August 23, 2021. As such, ABS-CBN-produced programs with him allowed to be aired on TV5 and feature on its news coverages, attend TV5 events which is the TV5 Kapatid Karavan on October 31, 2023 at Robinsons Lipa City and appear in non-ABS-CBN shows on TV5 such as his return on Eat Bulaga! on December 17, 2025, and GMA Network from December 18, 2025 like Family Feud and Fast Talk with Boy Abunda (as trailer clips).

From July to his 25th birthday on August 23, 2026, Jaranilla portrayed the role as Dr. Patrick Valdez (different from his previous character on Midnight Girls), a pathologist, on Wishdate: Unchanging Glass of Wish 107.5. The concert was made at Smart Araneta Coliseum and acting was made both on set and live.

In October 2026, he appeared on It's Showtime as part of its week-long 17th anniversary. The anniversary special aired on Kapamilya Channel, A2Z, All TV, and GMA Network, marking his second appearance on a GMA afternoon show after Eat Bulaga! in April 2011 but while retaining primary company allegiance with ABS-CBN due to the first three aforementioned channels and set at ABS-CBN Broadcasting Center with entry and exit point from ELJ Communications Center.

==== 2024–present: Indie freelancing ====
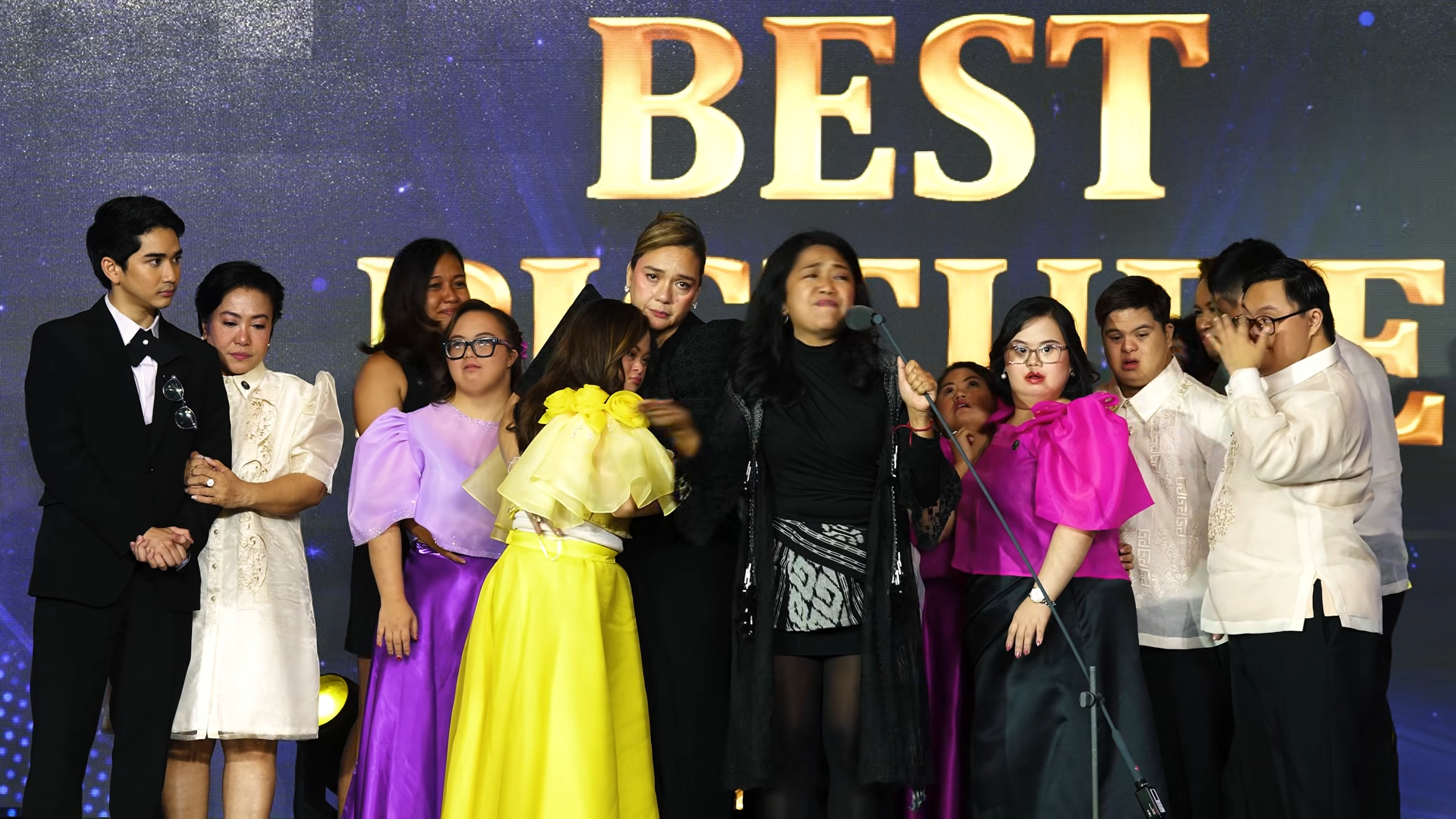
Jaranilla (leftmost, as an adult performer) with the cast of I'mPerfect at the Metro Manila Film Festival Gabi ng Parangal 2025.

On December 14, 2024, Jaranilla began his stint on non-ABS-CBN and independent productions upon signing with Blackfire Entertainment Film and Event Production for the production of the film Guryon. Due to the popularity of May Bukas Pa, Jaranilla created three more films related to it which are Guryon where he portrays the character as Nestor, a breadwinner. He stated that the character is similar to what he does in his family, providing their primary needs. The press conference was held at Gateway Mall Cinema 1 on October 17, 2026. He then portrayed priest character roles on Seeds of Peace: The Life of Fr. Rhoel D. Gallardo, CMF and Utoy Story as Rhoel Gallardo and Sandro, respectively. The latter two were concurrently with The Silent Noise production with the former was released on March 18, 2026 and one of the entries of the 2026 Metro Manila Film Festival nine months later on December 25, while the first and third have no release date yet.

On May 31, 2025, Jaranilla made his first indie series Si Sol at Si Luna as Sol de Dios, a photographer and film critic who falls in love with Luna (Jane Oineza). The series consists of 13 episodes and lasted until August 23, 2025, exactly at his 24th birthday. Also on that same year, he appeared on indie films The Last Beergin and I'mPerfect as Isaac and Ryan, respectively. The former role is one of the five strangers feeling that God had abandoned them and ended up drinking beer while the latter featuring Down syndrome artists Earl Amaba and Krystel Go as Ryan, the younger brother of Amaba's character. I'mPerfect won Best Picture and Best Ensemble, with Jaranilla himself nominated as Best Supporting Actor and Supporting Movie Actor of the Year from December 2025 to January 2026. He also portrayed as Nate/Nathaniel Tan on Last Online: A Player Short Film on October 28, 2025.

After the ABS-CBN-produced The Silent Noise, and two indie films Seeds of Peace and Utoy Story ended production on all with release of episodes for the first mentioned, he played the role as Patrick, the son of Jodi Sta. Maria who is being talked or communicated to, on Midnight Girls produced by TJAV Productions set at Japan. The movie underwent premiere night with the casts on May 11 at SM Megamall and then promoted on the 1,596th episode of Family Feud on May 12, 2026 played against the Garcia Team, and Jaranilla himself made film tourism by spending vacation with the Atayde family at the said country being the film's set in June 2026 for the 24th birthday of Gela Atayde who attended its premiere a month earlier and has the same age as Zaijian for two months and three days from June 20 to August 23 and the family's Father's Day 2026 celebration.

He will portray as Berto on his second indie series Crawlers after Dark, a smiling miner who lives for his family until his death from the police. The series' story conference was held on May 13, 2026, at Lancaster Hotel in Mandaluyong and will be produced by Z Studios Productions.

On August 7, 2026, Jaranilla portrayed as Denver on 2 Valid IDs, a political drama film, as part of 2026 Cinemalaya. Its talkback or press conference was later held on October 8, 2026 at SM North EDSA and released nationwide on October 14.

== Other ventures ==
=== Endorsements ===
Jaranilla started out as a model. After signing with ABS-CBN and its talent agency Star Magic, Jaranilla became a brand endorser for several companies. He endorsed the brand Bench from 2009 to 2012 and 2025, and Moose Gear from 2012 to 2016. He also appeared in campaigns for Globe Telecom (2009–2010), various Nestlé products (2009–2011), Argentina Andale Hotdog (2011), Converse, and Casino Plus (2025). In 2009, he was featured in a television commercial for the real estate development Morningfields at Carmeltown.

=== Advocacy and philanthropy ===
In 2009, Jaranilla publicly advocated for Millennium Development Goal (MDG) 4, which aims to reduce child mortality. He urged both candidates and voters to support this goal, which sought to reduce the mortality rate of children under five years old by two-thirds, between 1990 and 2015.

On November 4, 2009, the Bro, Ikaw ang Star ng Pasko campaign was launched with the release of ABS-CBN's Christmas station ID and the lighting of an 18-foot parol. The event was attended by ABS-CBN executives, including chairman Eugenio “Gabby” Lopez III, president Charo Santos-Concio, and ABS-CBN talents, including Jaranilla. The campaign, which involved contributions from various ABS-CBN departments, divisions, and subsidiaries, aimed to unite the network's employees with the shared goal of bringing joy to Filipinos and encouraging them to embrace the Christmas spirit, particularly following the damage caused by tropical storms Ondoy and Pepeng. The planning for the Bro, Ikaw ang Star ng Pasko campaign began as early as June, with teams from Sales, Marketing, Creative Communications Management (CCM), Licensing, Production, and Property presenting ideas to a leadership committee that included Channel 2 head Cory V. Vidanes and department heads. Vidanes suggested combining several of these concepts, including Marketing's company-wide Christmas tree lighting, Licensing's Parol ni Bro, CCM's station ID and tagline, a Christmas bazaar, and the Win sa Bituin viewers’ promo, into one cohesive campaign.

In 2010, Jaranilla took part in ABS-CBN's “Kapit Bisig sa Ilog Pasig” project, an environmental awareness campaign led by the ABS-CBN Foundation and environmental advocate Gina Lopez. The campaign, directed by Brillante Mendoza, aimed to promote the seven-year clean-up effort for the Pasig River, which had become heavily polluted. Jaranilla appeared in infomercials alongside other ABS-CBN talents including Coco Martin, Kim Atienza, Karen Davila, and Efren Peñaflorida.

In April 2011, he appeared on Eat Bulaga! aimed to promote Pak! Pak! My Dr. Kwak! and donate the prize money to Silid-kaalaman, the show's Library Project for underdeveloped schools in the Philippines.

In 2022, ABS-CBN and Star Magic launched the "Tulong-Tulong sa Pag-Ahon: Isang Daan sa Pagtutulungan" campaign to seek financial support for survivors of Typhoon Odette. Jaranilla, along with other celebrities, participated in sports and online gaming events to raise sponsorships and donations. Through this campaign, the ABS-CBN Foundation was able to deliver 584 home repair kits, provide food packs to 207,649 families in Palawan, and parts of Visayas and Mindanao, and restore the livelihoods of fishermen by supplying boats and other essential resources.

Through his family's appearance on GMA Network's Family Feud in December 2025, they won 20,000 pesos for the charity Down Syndrome Association of the Philippines, Inc., an association that gives support to persons with down syndrome. It is in line of the film I'mPerfect, on which Zaijian is part of the film's cast.

== Personal life ==
In 2019, he participated in a Mobile Legends: Bang Bang celebrity tournament organized by Star Magic, where he was named Most Valuable Player (MVP).

== Career credits ==
=== Mass media career ===
Key
†	Denotes media that have not yet been released

Zaijian Jaranilla's mass media career credits with year of release, title(s) and role
Year	Title	Role	Notes	Ref(s)
Television Commercials/Endorsements
2006	McDonald's: Good Kuya/Tweens	Paolo		
2007	Lactum MTV (With Supers)	Himself		
2008	Tide Original Scent Powder Detergent	Student		
2009	Morningfields at Carmeltown	Himself		
2009	Globe: Dasal	Himself		
2009–2011	Nestlé commercials	Himself	Commercials: "Ice Cream Sorbetes Stick: Brad" and "Bear Brand: Choco na Gatas o Gatas na Choco?" (2009); "Maggi Magic Sarap: Magic Rice Tutorial and Fantasia" and "Nestlé: Choose Wellness" (2010); "Bear Brand: Nestlé Kasambuhay Series and Victory" (2011)	
2010	Kapit Bisig Para sa Ilog Pasig by ABS-CBN Foundation: Saving the Pasig River	Himself		
2010	Neozep: Batang S	Himself		
2010	Globe Super IDD: Star Dad	Himself		
2010	EU-Philippines Justice Support Programme: Nasaan si Tatay?	Himself		
2011	Argentina Andale Hotdog	Himself		
Variety, Interview, and Talk Shows
2008	Goin' Bulilit	Guest Role		
2009–present	ASAP	Himself		
2009–present	It's Showtime	Himself		
2009–present	Kapamilya Chat	Himself		
2009–2010	Wowowee	Himself		
2010	Pilipinas Win Na Win	Himself		
2011; 2025	Eat Bulaga!	Himself	Episodes: April 19, 2011 (GMA Network); December 17, 2025 (TV5)	
2012	The Buzz	Himself		
2013	Minute to Win It	Himself		
2014	The Singing Bee	Himself		
2016–2024	Magandang Buhay	Himself		
2017–present	Push Bets/Push TV	Himself		
2018–present	Showtime Online U	Himself		
2018–2020	Tonight with Boy Abunda	Himself		
2025	Rainbow Rumble	Himself	Episodes: "Child Stars" and "Sylvia and Friends" (2025; Episodes 82 and 92)	
2025–2026	Libre Funalo Max	Himself	Episodes: "Letra Games Begin"; "Rampa Alala"; "Gag En Go": "Guard Scene"; "Ansabe ng Jellyfish (What Jellyfish Says?)"; "Use Cinema in a Sentence"; "Use Gamo-Gamo in a Sentence"; "Use Atis in a Sentence"; "Use Acacia in a Sentence"; "Pick-up Lines"	
2025–present	Family Feud	Himself	Episodes: "Jaranilla vs Forbes Family" (2025; Episode 889); "Midnight Girls and Boys vs Team Garcia" (2026; Episode 990)	
2026	Fast Talk with Boy Abunda	Himself / Various characters	Episodes: "I'mPerfect cast talks about their film’s success" (2026; Episode 781 - 2025 Metro Manila Film Festival Gabi ng Parangal and I'mPerfect film trailer clips); "Sanya Lopez at Jane Oineza, nagtrabaho sa Japan" (2026; Episode 852 - Midnight Girls trailer clip)	
2026	Kapamilya, Deal or No Deal	Lucky Star Case Holder		
2026	Its Cinemalaya SZN Again! Feat. The Cast of the Cinemalaya 22 Entries	Himself		
Mainstream Series, Films, Specials, and Announcements
2008	I Love Betty La Fea	Young Nicholas		
2008	Mars Ravelo's Komiks Presents	Young Tony		
2009–2021; 2025	Maalaala Mo Kaya	Various roles	Episodes: "Bisikleta" (2009); "Xylophone" (2010); "Callao Cave" (2011); "Alitaptap" and "Rosaryo" (2013); "Karayom" (2014); "Sketch Pad" (2015); "Armas" and "Mikropono" (2016); "Cellphone" and "Bandila" (2017); "Galon", "Fireworks", "Orasan", and "Dalandan" (2018); "Wheelchair" (2019); "Dialysis Machine" and "Urn" (2021); "Habal-habal" (2025)	
2009–2013	May Bukas Pa	Santino Guillermo/Gabriel Policarpio		
2009–2013	Sunday's Best	Santino Guillermo/Gabriel Policarpio	Episode: "Banal" (2011)	
2009–present	ABS-CBN Christmas Special	Himself / Performer		
2010	Agua Bendita	Otep (voice)		
2010	Noah	Jacob Perez/Eli		
2010	RPG Metanoia	Nico/Zero (voice)		
2010; 2026–present	24 Oras	Himself / Various characters		
2011	Mara Clara	Mara's Sweet 16 Dance		
2011	Your Song	Miggy Moreno	Episode: "Kim"	
2011	Pak! Pak! My Dr. Kwak!	Angelito		
2011	Ikaw ay Pag-ibig	Francisco "Nonoy" Garrido Jr./Julius Reyes		
2011–2016	Wansapanataym	Various roles	Episodes: "Bully-Lit" and "Dirty Larry" (2011); "Water Willy" (2012); "Gagambuboy", "Number One Father & Son", "Kapitan Liit", "Si Paolo at Si Apollo", "Nicolas Layas", Kilalang Kilala Ka Ba Niya?", "Teacher's Pest", "Gigie in A Bottle", "Kukotakot", "Baby Ko ang Daddy Ko", "Hungry Games", "No Read No Write Nomar", "Petrang Paminta", and "Sako Lantern" (2013); "That's My Toy, That's My Boy" (2016)	
2012	Lorenzo's Time	Lorenzo "Enzo" Montreal		
2012	24/7 in Love	Jomar Ronquillo		
2013	Juan dela Cruz	Tonton		
2014	Ikaw Lamang	Young Samuel Severino		
2014	Hawak Kamay	Raymond Emong A. Vitorio Raymond "Emong" Agustin		
2015	Hamog	Rashid		
2015	Pangil sa Tubig	Benjie		
2015	FPJ's Ang Probinsyano	Cocoy Amaba		
2016	The Story of Us	Young Macoy		
2018	Bagani	Liksi		
2019	StarStruck	Himself	Announcement for supporting Shayne Sava as Ultimate Female Survivor.	
2019	Story of My Life	Rex Innocencio		
2020	Almost Paradise	Teenager		
2020	Boyette: Not a Girl Yet	Boyette Camacho		
2021	Ang sa Iyo ay Akin	Jacob P. Villarosa		
2021–present	Frontline Pilipinas	Himself / Various characters		
2022	The Broken Marriage Vow	Gio "Victorino" Illustre		
2022	Mar's Ravelos Darna	Ricardo "Ding" Custodio		
2023	Senior High	Timothy "Tim" Castro		
2024	Life After Senior High	Timothy "Tim" Castro		
2024	High Street	Timothy "Tim" Castro		
2025	Incognito	Emer		
2025	TV Patrol Express	Himself / Guest		
2025	2025 Metro Manila Film Festival Gabi ng Parangal	Himself / Emcee	Both as one of the event's hosts and awards nominee for the film I'mPerfect, aired on TV5 platforms.	
2026	The Silent Noise	Matteo V. Carpio		
2026–present	Balitanghali	Himself / Various characters		
Other Media (Indie Series and Films, and Media not Produced by the Three Philippine Major Media Companies)
2025	Si Sol at Si Luna	Solomon "Sol" R. de Dios		
2025	The Last Beergin	Isaac		
2025	Last Online: A Player Short Film and Nathan's Full Interview	Nate/AAiel/Nathaniel Tan		
2025	I'mPerfect	Ryan		
2026	Guryon †	Nestor		
2026	Ang Pagtutuli †	Pepito		
2026	Seeds of Peace	Rhoel Gallardo		
2026	Utoy Story	Sandro		
2026	2 Valid IDs	Denver		
2026	Midnight Girls	Patrick		
2026	Wish Date: Unchanging Glass	Dr. Patrick Valdez		
2026	Crawlers at Night †	Berto		

=== Studio albums and music video ===
List of studio albums and music video, with selected details
Title	Album details
May Bukas Pa (Conversations Of Bro & Santino)	Released: 2009; Label: Star Music; Formats: CD, digital download, YouTube
ABS-CBN Summer Station IDs (with other ABS-CBN Artists)	Released: 2009–2021; Labels: ABS-CBN, Star Music; Formats: Digital download, YouTube
ABS-CBN Christmas Station IDs (with other ABS-CBN Artists and Management)	Released: 2009–present; Labels: ABS-CBN, Star Music; Formats: Digital download, YouTube
Ikaw ang Magic ng Buhay Ko	Released: 2011–2012; Labels: Star Magic, Star Music; Format: YouTube
Heto Na Naman (with Hannah Magdales)	Released: 2019; Labels: Viva Records; Format: Digital download, YouTube
Naubos Na (with Ian Manibale)	Released: 2026; Label: Star Music; Formats: Digital download, YouTube

=== Non-mass media announcements ===
Year	Title of Announcement
2009–present	Artista Salon
2010–2018	UST Angelicum College
2021–2024	Colegio de San Juan de Dios, San Rafael, Bulacan
2025	Casino Plus
2026	G Car Spa, Pares Hub, and Square Root Cafe, Santo Tomas, Batangas
2026	Jemay Cinco: Pinoy Hilot

== Accolades ==
Awards and Nomination
Award-giving body	Year	Category	Nominated work	Result	Ref.
Anak TV Seal Awards	2009	Most Admired Male TV Personality	May Bukas Pa	Included	
Anak TV Seal Awards	2010	The 2010 Anak TV Roster of Makabata Stars (Male)	—N/a	Won	
Anak TV Seal Awards	2012	Male Personality	—N/a	Won	
Anak TV Seal Awards	2025	Anak TV Net Makabata Stars	—N/a	Nominated	
ASAP Pop Viewers' Choice Awards	2009	Pop Kapamilya New Face	May Bukas Pa	Won	
ASAP Pop Viewers' Choice Awards	2009	Pop Kapamilya TV Character	May Bukas Pa	Won	
ASAP Pop Viewers' Choice Awards	2014	Pop Teen Popsies (Note: Shared with Andrea Brillantes.)	Hawak Kamay	Nominated	
Asian Academy Creative Awards	2022	Best Actor in a Supporting Role (Note: Jaranilla is the national winner for this category.)	The Broken Marriage Vow	Nominated	
C1 Originals Award	2015	Best Actor	Hamog	Nominated	
EdukCircle Awards	2019	Best Actor in a Single Drama Performance	Maalaala Mo Kaya: Wheelchair	Won	
Gawad Tanglaw	2010	Natatanging Gawad TANGLAW para sa Sining ng Telebisyon	May Bukas Pa	Won	
Gawad PASADO Awards	2010	Pinakapasadong Simbolo sa Kagandahang Asal	May Bukas Pa	Won	
Jeepney Fan Favorite Awards	2022	Fave Child Star	May Bukas Pa	Won	
Kagitingan Awards for TV	2019	Pinaka-magiting na Personalidad ng Drama Anthology	Maalaala Mo Kaya: Orasan	Won	
Lingkod TV Awards	2010–2011	Most Favorite Child Personality	May Bukas Pa	Won	
Metro Manila Film Festival	2025	Best Supporting Actor	I'mPerfect	Nominated	
Metro Manila Film Festival	2025	Best Ensemble (Note: Shared with the cast of I'mperfect.)	I'mPerfect	Won	
PMPC Star Awards for Movies	2012	Movie Child Performer of the Year	Pak! Pak! My Dr. Kwak!	Nominated	
7th NSCART Awards	2016	Best Male Child Star	—N/a	Won	
PMPC Star Awards for Television	2009	Best New Male TV Personality	May Bukas Pa	Won	
PMPC Star Awards for Television	2012	Best Child Performer	Ikaw ay Pag-Ibig	Nominated	
PMPC Star Awards for Television	2013	Best Child Performer	Lorenzo's Time	Nominated	
PMPC Star Awards for Television	2013	Best Single Performance by an Actor	Maalaala Mo Kaya: Rosaryo	Nominated	
PMPC Star Awards for Television	2014	Best Single Performance by an Actor	Maalaala Mo Kaya: Karayom	Nominated	
PMPC Star Awards for Television	2015	Best Child Performer	Hawak Kamay	Nominated	
PMPC Star Awards for Television	2018	Best Single Performance by an Actor	Ipaglaban Mo: Titser	Nominated	
RAWR Awards	2018	Beshie ng Taon	Bagani	Nominated	
TAG Awards Chicago	2023	Best Supporting Actor	Senior High	Nominated	
USTv Awards	2010	Students' Choice of Actor in a Daily Soap Opera	May Bukas Pa	Won	
VP Choice Awards	2023	TV Supporting Actor of the Year	Darna	Nominated	
VP Choice Awards	2024	Breakthrough Star of the Year	Senior High	Nominated	
VP Choice Awards	2024	BL Loveteam for the Year (Note: Shared with Miggy Jimenez.)	Senior High	Nominated	
VP Choice Awards	2025	BL Loveteam for the Year	High Street	Nominated	
VP Choice Awards	2026	Supporting Movie Actor of the Year	I'mPerfect	Nominated	
Primetime Media Choice Awards	2026	Best Supporting Actor	I'mPerfect	Nominated	
