= List of Make It with You episodes =

Make It with You is a 2020 Philippine romantic drama television series broadcast by ABS-CBN. The series premiered on the network's Primetime Bida evening block and worldwide via The Filipino Channel from January 13 to March 13, 2020, replacing Starla.

== Series overview ==
Season	Episodes	Originally released	
Season	Episodes	First released	Last released
1	45	January 13, 2020	March 13, 2020

== Episodes ==
=== Season 1 ===
No. overall	No. in season	Title	Original release date	Kantar Media Ratings (nationwide)
1	1	"Let's Make It with You"	January 13, 2020	27.4%
2	2	"Make It Happen with You"	January 14, 2020	28.9%
3	3	"Make It Work with You"	January 15, 2020	25.3%
4	4	"Make Pudding with You"	January 16, 2020	28.1%
5	5	"Make Hopia with You"	January 17, 2020	25.7%
6	6	"Make New Beginnings"	January 20, 2020	27.4%
7	7	"Tinapay Wars with You"	January 21, 2020	28.3%
8	8	"Copy Paste with You"	January 22, 2020	27.3%
9	9	"Make Asado with You"	January 23, 2020	28.5%
10	10	"Big Reveal"	January 24, 2020	27.2%
11	11	"Move On without You"	January 27, 2020	28.2%
12	12	"Girl On Fire"	January 28, 2020	28.3%
13	13	"Team Bahay"	January 29, 2020	27.0%
14	14	"Start Over with You"	January 30, 2020	27.7%
15	15	"Deja Vu with You"	January 31, 2020	27.2%
16	16	"Real Talk with You"	February 3, 2020	26.3%
17	17	"The Big Blow Out with You"	February 4, 2020	27.6%
18	18	"Make It Complicated with You"	February 5, 2020	27.8%
19	19	"Game Of Hearts with You"	February 6, 2020	26.2%
20	20	"Break It with You"	February 7, 2020	26.9%
21	21	"Game Changer"	February 10, 2020	23.8%
22	22	"Big Choose Day with You"	February 11, 2020	25.6%
23	23	"The Big Risk with You"	February 12, 2020	25.7%
24	24	"Fake It with You"	February 13, 2020	28.2%
25	25	"Make It Real with You"	February 14, 2020	28.6%
26	26	"High in Love"	February 17, 2020	28.4%
27	27	"Heart to Hurt Talk"	February 18, 2020	24.8%
28	28	"Make It Right with You"	February 19, 2020	26.1%
29	29	"Hot N Cold"	February 20, 2020	25.6%
30	30	"Change of Heart"	February 21, 2020	25.8%
31	31	"Break Down Walls"	February 24, 2020	25.0%
32	32	"Sacrifice for Love"	February 25, 2020	23.3%
33	33	"Big Surprise"	February 26, 2020	23.3%
34	34	"The Choice"	February 27, 2020	24.8%
35	35	"Breakthrough"	February 28, 2020	23.4%
36	36	"Make or Break"	March 2, 2020	27.3%
37	37	"Past Forward"	March 3, 2020	25.0%
38	38	"Big Reunion"	March 4, 2020	25.9%
39	39	"GaBing Mainit"	March 5, 2020	25.6%
40	40	"Final Answer"	March 6, 2020	25.8%
41	41	"Begin Again"	March 9, 2020	25.5%
42	42	"Deal or No Deal"	March 10, 2020	25.8%
43	43	"Hinala"	March 11, 2020	24.8%
44	44	"Love on Top"	March 12, 2020	20.1%
45	45	"Under the Stars"	March 13, 2020	26.2%
