= Daniela Stranner =

Filipina actress (born 2002)

- Born: Daniela Gutierrez Stranner; September 25, 2002 (age 24)
- Occupation: Actress
- Years active: 2018–present
- Agent(s): Star Magic; Rise Artists Studio
- Website: Official website

Daniela Gutierrez Stranner (born September 25, 2002) is a Filipino-German actress. She first acted in the television series Make It With You (2020), and gained recognition for her role as Z in the teen mystery series Senior High (2023–2024). Stranner made her film debut in Cathy Garcia-Sampana's romance Love at First Stream (2021), which earned her a Best Actress nomination at the 2021 Metro Manila Film Festival.

Stranner was also part of the inaugural batch of artists in Rise Artists Studio, the talent management arm of ABS-CBN Films.

== Early life ==
Daniela Gutierrez Stranner was born on September 25, 2002, and raised in Angeles, Pampanga. Stranner was discovered in a mall and invited to audition for ABS-CBN. During her audition, talent manager Johnny Manahan offered her a two-year artist contract on the spot.

== Career ==
Stranner was introduced in 2018 as part of the Star Magic Circle, a group of new talents under Star Magic. In 2020, she became part of the first batch of 13 artists launched under Rise Artists Studio. That same year, she made her television debut as Cheska Crismo in the romantic comedy series Make It With You.

== Filmography ==
=== Film ===
Key
†	Denotes films that have not yet been released

Year	Title	Role	Notes	Ref.
2021	Love at First Stream	Vilma "V" Ramirez	Metro Manila Film Festival entry	
2025	The Last Goodbye	Heart Fajardo	Main Role	
2026	The Lotto Winner	Chinchin		
2026	Ang Magtutuli †	TBA	Main Role	

=== Television ===
Year	Title	Role	Notes	Ref.
2020	Make It With You	Cheska Crismo	Support Role	
2022	My Papa Pi	Charmaine	Support Role	
2022	Tara, G!	Cars	Main Role	
2023-2024	Senior High	Zyra "Z" Aguerro	Main Role	
2023	Love Bites	Shane	Season 2; Story 6 (Summer Camp); Main Role	
2023	Fractured	Sophia	Main Role	
2023	Linlang	Maricar	Guest Role	
2024	High Street	Zyra "Z" Aguerro	Main Role	
2024	Pamilya Sagrado	Maxine Turiano	Support Role	
2026	Someone, Someday	Valerie "Val" Jones	Support Role	
2026	Pinoy Big Brother: Collab 3.0	Herself	Regular Housemate (Day 23)	

== Awards and nominations ==
Awards and nominations
Year	Award giving body	Category	Nominated work	Results
2021	2021 Metro Manila Film Festival	Best Actress	Love at First Stream	Nominated
2025	6th VP Choice Awards	Breakthrough Star of the Year	High Street	Nominated
