= Midnight Girls =

2026 drama film by Irene Emma Villamor

- Theatrical poster, designed by Jed Descutido
- Directed by: Irene Emma Villamor
- Screenplay by: Irene Emma Villamor
- Story by: Ays de Guzman
- Original concept: Rod Marmol; Edgar Mortiz
- Produced by: Edgar Mortiz
- Starring: Sanya Lopez; Loisa Andalio; Jane Oineza; Jodi Sta. Maria
- Cinematography: Pao Orendain
- Edited by: Renard Torres
- Music by: Len Calvo
- Production company: TJAV Productions
- Distributed by: Warner Bros. Pictures
- Release dates: 29 April 2026 (Italy); 13 May 2026 (Philippines)
- Running time: 104 minutes
- Country: Philippines
- Languages: Filipino; Japanese

Midnight Girls is a 2026 Philippine drama film written and directed by Irene Emma Villamor from a story by Ays de Guzman and based on the story concept developed by Rod Marmol and Edgar Mortiz, who also serves as producer. Starring Sanya Lopez, Loisa Andalio, Jane Oineza, and Jodi Sta. Maria, the story follows the formation of a profound sisterhood among four Filipina entertainers as they navigate the emotional toll and personal sacrifices associated with pursuing their aspirations in Nagoya, Japan.

Produced by TJAV Productions and distributed by Warner Bros. Pictures, the film premiered in Italy on 29 April 2026, as part of the Udine Far East Film Festival and had a theatrical run in the Philippines on 13 May.

== Plot ==
Paris, Wanna, Saki, and Vicky are four Filipinas who form a sisterhood as they navigate life as entertainers in Nagoya.

== Cast ==
=== Main cast ===
- Sanya Lopez as Paris
- Loisa Andalio as Wanna: A 20-year-old newcomer who hails from Bongabon.
- Jane Oineza as Saki
- Jodi Sta. Maria as Vicky: A veteran entertainer who joined the industry after her husband left her and their son.

=== Special participation ===
- Carmi Martin as Mama Charry: The owner and manager of a nightclub where the four women work.
- Miggy Jimenez as Danny: Wanna's ex-boyfriend
- Shamaine Buencamino as Virgie: Vicky's mother and Patrick's grandmother
- Meryll Soriano as Nanay Shirley
- Zaijian Jaranilla as Patrick: Vicky's college-aged son
- Edwin Serrano as Tatay Rogelio
- Nor Domingo as Papa Naldo
- Lotlot Bustamante as Ms. Jocelyn Castro: One of the people from the labor union.
- Jonathan Tadioan as Tito Art
- Ekis Gimenez as Kuya Roy: The president of a labor union whom Patrick and Toffee supported for their rally
- Shun Gomez as Toffee: Patrick's boyfriend and fellow activist.
- Dorothy Labro as Filipina Agent

== Production ==
According to filmmaker Irene Emma Villamor, the film's concept originated from the idea based on the immersions of actor-comedian Edgar "Bobot" Mortiz, who serves as the project's producer, and former Star Cinema producer Malou N. Santos in Nagoya. Mortiz and Santos were responsible in approaching the filmmaker to make their gathered knowledge and experiences into a film project.

=== Filming ===
Before the shoot, the principal cast took part in a three-day immersion in the entertainment district, which included opportunities to interact with individuals who inspired their characters and to learn Japanese language and dance skills. The filming period took one month, with almost all of the sequences shot in Nagoya, while the scenes shot in the Philippines were done using an iPhone.

== Reception ==
=== Critical response ===
Merumo Ito, writing for Sinegang PH, gave the film five stars and praised it for its empathetic and grounded portrayal of the four main characters, emphasizing the moral and emotional challenges OFWs encounter while providing for their families overseas. She also praised the film's complex portrayal of womanhood, highlighting how family responsibilities and financial hardship can make it difficult to distinguish between necessities and choices.

Nazamel Tabares, writing for Pelikula Mania, gave the film three-and-a-half out of five stars, praising it for focusing on the exhausting day-to-day realities and emotional labor of the women’s work rather than sensationalism and stereotypes. It also emphasizes how the film accurately captures the stigma and criticism the four main characters encounter, particularly from other Filipinos, making the emotional toll even greater than the actual work.

Fred Hawson, writing for ABS-CBN News and Current Affairs, also gave a positive review, praising Villamor's direction and screenplay for giving a "fresh, vibrant and engaging" approach to the Japan-bound Filipina entertainers. Although Andalio's character arc received insufficient attention, the main cast's acting performances were also commended.

Rolling Stone Philippines lists Midnight Girls as among the 14 best films for the year 2026.
