= High Street (TV series) =

2024 Philippine television mystery drama series

- Season 1 Promotional Poster
- Genre: Drama; Mystery
- Written by: Bridgette Ann M. Rebuca; John Joseph Tuason; Kay Conlu-Brondial
- Directed by: Onat Diaz; Lino Cateyano; Dolly Dulu; Rico Navarro; Ram Tolentino
- Starring: Andrea Brillantes; Juan Karlos Labajo; Zaijian Jaranilla; Xyriel Manabat; Elijah Canlas; Daniela Stranner; Miggy Jimenez; Tommy Alejandrino; Gela Atayde; Angel Aquino; Romnick Sarmenta; Dimples Romana
- Theme music composer: Len Calvo; Adriane Macalipay
- Opening theme: "Kalma Kahit Magulo" by Juan Karlos and Colet Vergara & Jhoanna Robles of Bini (Note: Credits as per the show's closing credits)
- Composer: Jonathan Manalo
- Country of origin: Philippines
- Original language: Filipino
- No. of episodes: 80 + 5 webisodes

Production
- Executive producers: Carlo Katigbak; Cory V. Vidanes; Laurenti M. Dyogi; Jamie C. Lopez; Roldeo T. Endrinal; Rondel P. Lindayag; Kylie Manalo-Balagtas
- Producers: Rosselle Soldao-Gannaban; Minelle Nielo Espiritu; Camille Rosales-Navarro
- Cinematography: Cesca Lee
- Editors: Rommel Malimban; John Ryan Bonifacio; Christine Ang; Karla Diaz; Cecile Basaysay; Levi Elechosa
- Camera setup: Single-camera
- Running time: 19-37 minutes
- Production company: Dreamscape Entertainment

Original release
- Network: Kapamilya Channel (Note: The series was also aired on A2Z (analog free TV in Manila only, and digital TV in Nationwide only), Jeepney TV (delayed telecast, cable TV only), Kapamilya Online Live, and TV5 (free TV in Nationwide).); iWantTFC
- Release: May 13 – August 30, 2024

Related
- Senior High

High Street is a Philippine mystery drama television series that aired on Kapamilya Channel. The series is the sequel to Senior High. Directed by Onat A. Diaz, Lino S. Cayetano, Dolly Dulu, Rico Navarro and Ram Tolentino, it stars Andrea Brillantes, Juan Karlos Labajo, Zaijian Jaranilla, Xyriel Manabat, Elijah Canlas, Daniela Stranner, Miggy Jimenez, Tommy Alejandrino, Gela Atayde, Angel Aquino, Romnick Sarmenta and Dimples Romana. It premiered on May 13, 2024, on the network's Primetime Bida line up. The series concluded on August 30, 2024, with a total of 80 episodes with 5 webisodes before the premiere.

== Summary ==
Set five years after the students' graduation from Northford High School, William, who had been in a coma, suddenly regains consciousness. Meanwhile, the death of Sky's twin sister is still haunting her and harbors unresolved anger from the events of five years ago and has hallucinations of her family that William massacred. At Sanya and Kenjie's engagement party, Sky and her close friends reunite. Tania lands a job at Soleil and quickly bonds with its CEO, Tori. Unbeknownst to them, Tori and her group have secretly been plotting against them while assisting William during his paralysis.

Sky becomes the first target, following her family and friends. The group even abducts Z, who was supposed to return to the United States for her safety, and keeps her imprisoned in a basement. As Sky and her friends investigate William's plans, Tori's group subtly works to mislead and sabotage them. The group successfully ruins Kenjie's career and engagement to Sanya, while also triggering Poch's past traumas, leading to issues in his career and relationship with Tim. Meanwhile, Gino searches for answers about his family's dark past, only to uncover a shocking truth with Sky: William is not Gino's biological father.

Sky and Tim eventually rescue Z from Tori's group. As William recovers with plans to launch a surprise attack on Sky, his own sister, Tori, who poisons him, betrays her. Although Sky and her friends believe their nightmare is over, but the horror continues as a new one begins. Tori seized control of OnQ and has fired Sky, Dante, and other top employees. This prompts them to form an independent media company to investigate Tori. They soon discover that Tori's real name is Corazon Garcia, William's half-sister, who is plotting to eliminate Sky and anyone close to her. They later found out that Wesley and Nikki were Tori's children, and they helped their mother's plot.

After several confessions to the police, it is revealed that the Castrodes family was involved in a sinister plot and corrupt and criminal activities. Nikki is surrendered to the authorities, while Wesley dies in a car accident while pursuing Sky and Gino. Meanwhile, Tori and Esteves kidnap Tania and her baby, Star, and hold them hostage at the abandoned Northford High School. Sky and Gino arrive, only to realize it is a trap. In a heroic act, Sky saves her family and friends but sacrifices her life in the process. The police ultimately kill Tori and Esteves thus the nightmarish ordeal finally comes to an end.

At Sky's funeral, her loved ones gather to celebrate her life. Eight months later, Nikki takes responsibility for her involvement and partaking in her family's crimes and atrocities. Gino begins to reclaim his childhood through playing the guitar again; Yana and Z work at the Women of Today Crisis Center; Tim and Poch, as well as Archie and Roxy, are married; and Sanya and Kenjie renew their friendship. Dante discovers a USB containing the "Northford Files," a collection of data Sky had completed before her death.

One year after Sky's passing, her family and friends reunite to mark her death anniversary. Dante presents the "Northford Files" documentary, which concludes with Sky's inspiring final message, leaving everyone that her legacy has moved, exposing publicly all of the brutal and fiendish happenings in Northford High, and the threat of the corruptions, atrocities, and evilness of William and Tori have been dismantled and defeated once and for all.

== Cast and characters ==
Cast

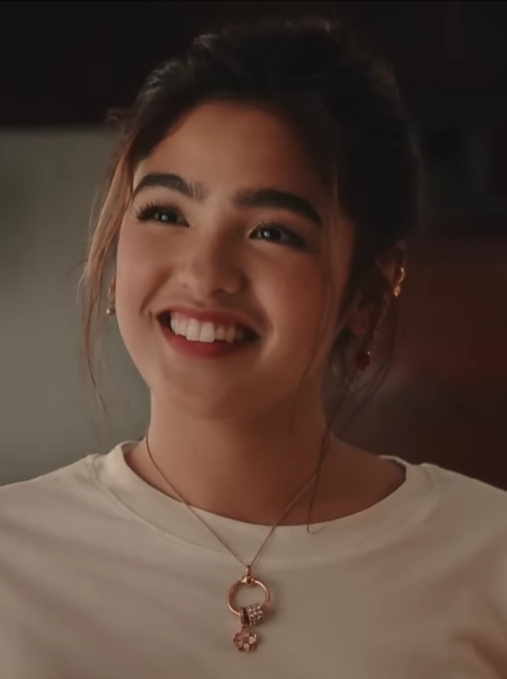
Andrea Brillantes

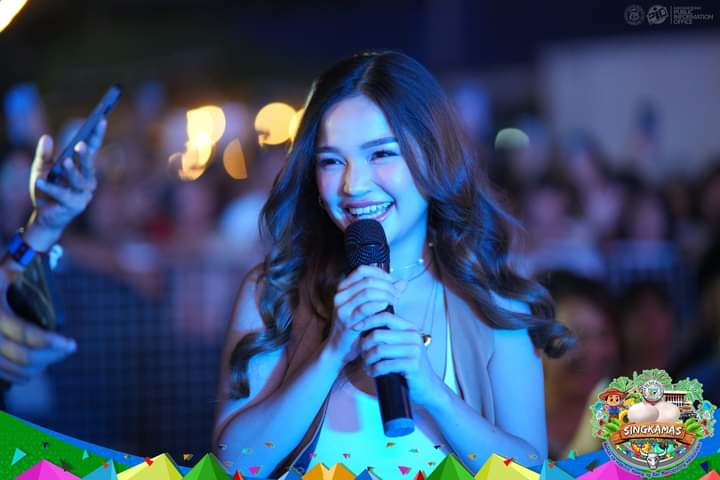
Xyriel Manabat

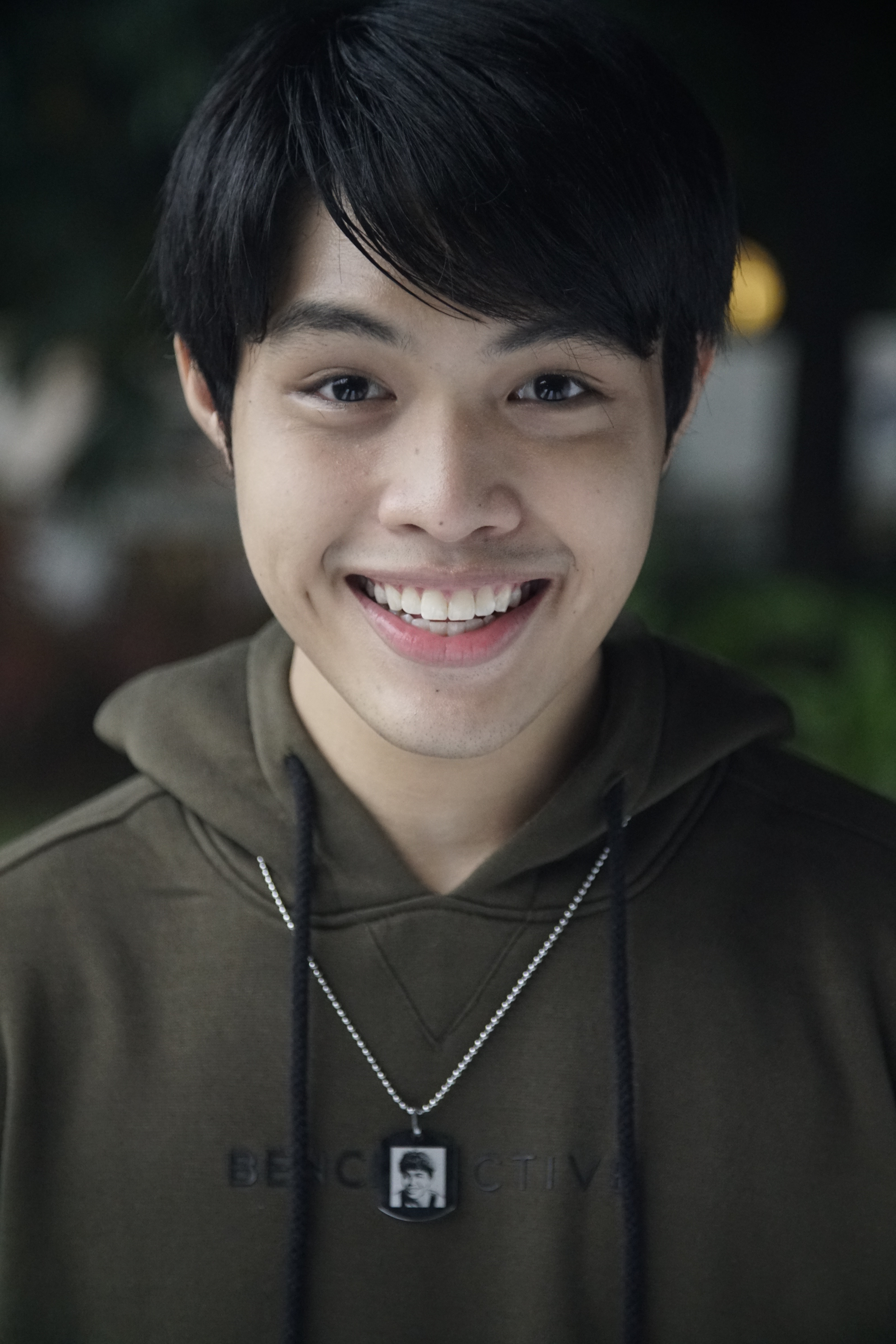
Elijah Canlas

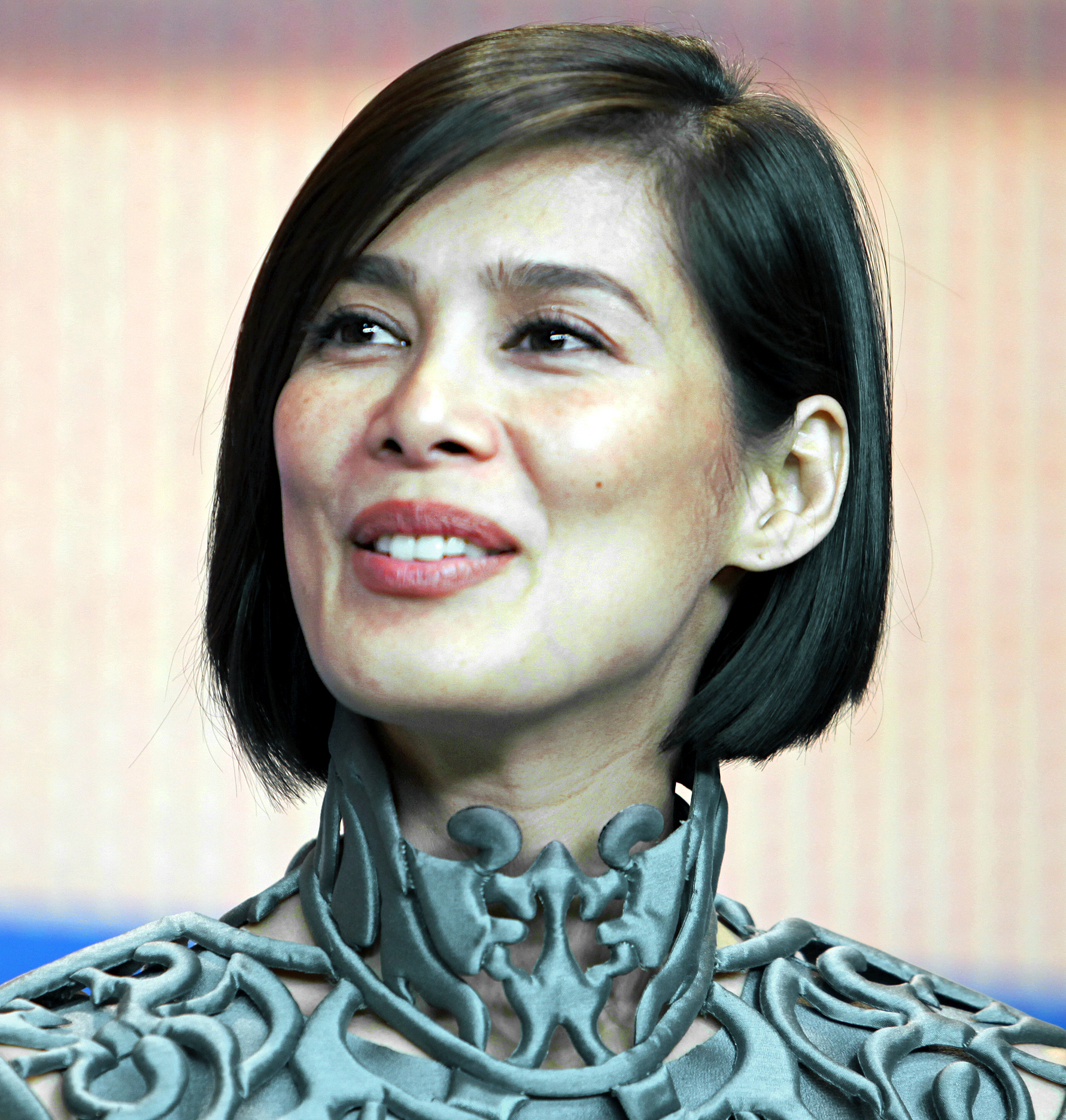
Angel Aquino

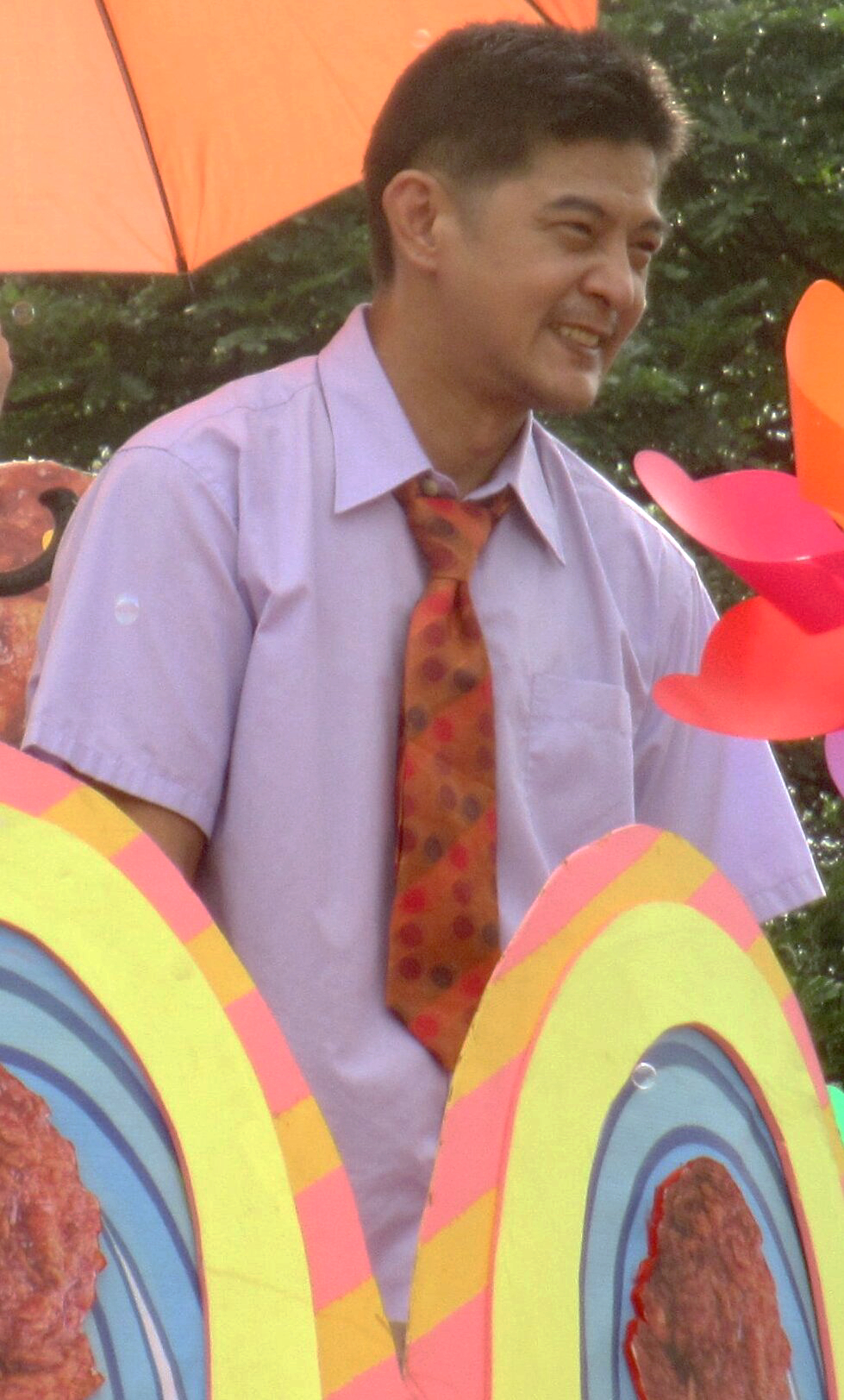
Romnick Sarmenta

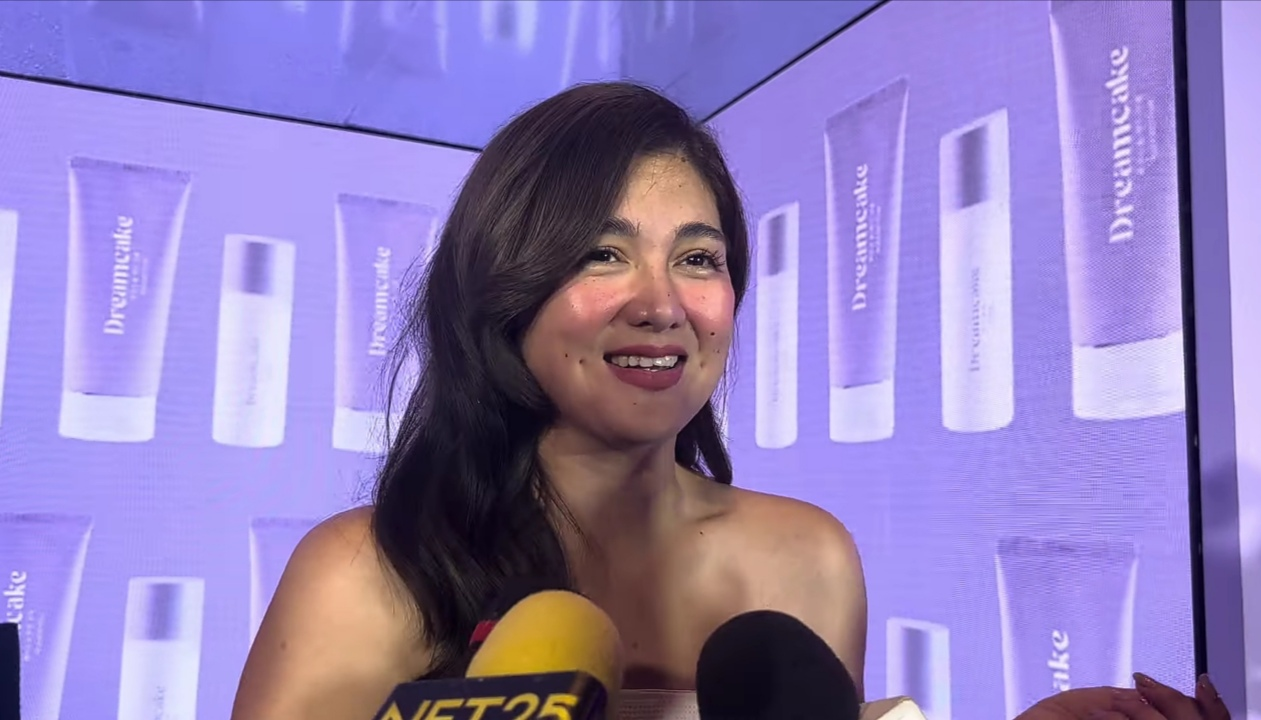
Dimples Romana

=== Main cast ===
Starring

- Andrea Brillantes as Sky Love Cruz (Note: According to the prequel, her biological father is Harry Aguerro, but her legal last name is Cruz.) — Luna's younger twin sister, Archie, Z and Star's half-sister, Roxy's half-sister-in-law, Tania's daughter, and Riley's half-aunt. An investigative journalist determined to uncover Governor William Acosta's crimes, with help from friends Gino, Tim, Poch, Kenjie, and Sanya. After Tori fired her, Sky joins Dante and former OnQ executives to establish a new independent journalism company. In the finale, Tori killed her after saving her loved ones (friends, mother and half-siblings) from her hands.
- Juan Karlos Labajo (Note: Credited as Juan Karlos.) as Gino Acosta —Cecille's son that William Acosta adopted him. A close friend of Sky, Tim, Roxy, Poch, Kenjie, and Sanya, he works for Atty. Jeff Bautista, assisting Sky in exposing his family's dark secrets.
- Zaijian Jaranilla as PCPL Timothy "Tim" Castro (Note: The character's rank is based on R.A. No. 11200, the current law prescribing police ranks in the Philippines) — a cybercrime police officer and Poch's husband. Collaborates closely with Sky, Gino, Roxy, Kenjie, and Sanya.
- Xyriel Manabat as Roxanne Fatima "Roxy" G. Cristobal-Aguerro (Note: According to episode 1 of the "Life After Senior High" special mini-series, the Cristobal sisters' middle name is Garcia. However, they are unrelated to Tori's family.) — Riley's mother, Kevin and Tim's ex-girlfriend, Archie's wife, and a nurse at Angel of Mercy Hospital. Balances her profession with caring for her son and is a close friend of Gino, Tim, Poch, Kenjie, and Sanya. Reunites with Archie to mend their relationship.
- Elijah Canlas as Archimedes "Archie" Aguerro — Luna and Sky's half-brother, Z's brother, Roxy's husband, and Riley's biological father. After being imprisoned in the U.S., he returns on parole to reconcile with his family and becomes co-owner of Here Cafe + Bar.
- Daniela Stranner as Zyra "Z" Aguerro — Luna and Sky's half-sister, Archie's sister, and a victim of long-term abuse at Northford High School. A group affiliated with William Acosta, who groomed her during her senior year, abducted her.
- Miggy Jimenez as Pocholo "Poch" Robles — Tim's husband, Sky's close friend, and a survivor of abuse at Northford High School. Formerly an actor, he later manages Here Cafe + Bar.
- Tommy Alejandrino as Kenjie Juan — Sanya's ex-boyfriend, Sky's close friend, and a Junior Secretary at Juan Canning Corporation. After his relationship with Sanya ends, he co-owns Here Cafe + Bar and renews his friendship with her. He later came out as bisexual.
- Gela Atayde as Sanya Alba — Kenjie's ex-girlfriend, a Junior Secretary at Juan Canning Corporation, and Sky's close friend. She later renews her friendship with Kenjie.
- Angel Aquino as Tania Mae Cruz — Luna and Sky's mother, Archie and Z's half-aunt, and a former staff member at Soleil. After Tori fired her, she becomes the mother of Star, her daughter with Brandon.
- Romnick Sarmenta as Dante T. Eballa — Head of Content at OnQ and a former activist whose family Governor Acosta murdered. He later quits OnQ to join Sky in founding a new independent journalism company.
- Dimples Romana as Victoria "Tori" Soler / Victoria Garcia-Castrodes (Note: Tori's full legal name is Victoria Garcia-Castrodes; Soler was a made-up surname, and Corazon Garcia is her dead name.) / Corazon Garcia — Reginald's wife, Wesley and Nikki's mother, and the corrupt CEO of Soleil. A psychopath, she initially collaborated with her half-brother, Governor William Acosta, but ultimately betrays and poisons him. In the finale, the police killed her after fatally shooting Sky.

Also starring

- Mon Confiado as William L. Acosta — former Governor of Northford and former President of Northford High School. He is Cecille's abusive husband and Gino's adoptive father. When his desire was driven for revenge against Sky, he conspires with his illegitimate half-sister, Corazon/Tori, and her associates. However, Tori ultimately betrays him, poisoning him to death while furthering her own malevolent plans.
- Ana Abad Santos as Dr. Cecille Acosta — wife of Governor William Acosta and Gino's mother, who was a victim of rape, resulting in Gino's birth.
- Gerald Madrid as Elmo Castro — father of Tim and husband of Edith.
- Angeli Bayani as Editha "Edith" Borromeo-Castro — mother of Tim and wife of Elmo.
- Kean Cipriano as Brandon — Tania's husband, Sky's step-father, and Star's father.
- Inka Magnaye as Becca — Tania's close friend.
- Rans Rifol as Ria G. Cristobal — Roxy's older sister and Riley's aunt, who works as a nurse at the Angel of Mercy Hospital. She later becomes one of Dr. Max's victims of sexual harassment.
- Harvey Bautista as Wesley Mata / Wesley G. Castrodes (Note: Wesley’s full legal name is Mark Joseph Wesley Garcia Castrodes as seen in the morgue nametag, but is shortened to Wesley for simplicity.) — son of Tori and Reginald, Nikki's adoptive brother, and a hacker posing as a journalist, who is deeply obsessed with Sky. He works for his mother's group and meets his end when a car strikes him while attempting to kidnap Sky and kill Gino.
- AC Bonifacio as Monica "Nikki" Romero / Monica G. Castrodes — Wesley's adoptive sister, a hacker pretending to be a journalist and working with Tori's group. She is Reginald and Tori's adopted daughter, originally named Daisy Laygo. Arrested for her involvement in her mother's criminal schemes, including the abduction of Z.
- Ralph de Leon as Dr. Kevin Gonzales — Roxy's ex-boyfriend and a resident doctor at the Angel of Mercy Hospital, who had feelings for Roxy before they broke up.
- Argus Aspiras as Riley C. Aguerro (Note: Archie is the biological father of Roxy’s son Riley, but their child only had Roxy’s last name on the original birth certificate. As of episode 77, Riley’s legal last name is Aguerro.) — Sky's half-nephew, Z and Ria's nephew, and the son of Roxy and Archie.

=== Recurring cast ===
- Art Acuña as PCOL Emil Concha, a Police Colonel in Northford.
- Franco Laurel as Atty. Jeff Bautista, an experienced attorney known for handling challenging cases.
- Cai Cortez as Ruth Chavez, a high-level management employee at Soleil.
- John Medina as Simon Arevalo, an associate involved in Tori's operations.
- Maika Rivera as Cynthia Rivas, a reporter and managing editor at OnQ.
- Nour Hooshmand as Yana Rosales, Sky's closest friend and one of the victims of long-term sexual abuse at Northford High School. She works as a law employee.
- Sandy Aloba as Rosa, one of the top employees at OnQ, who later joins Dante's independent media company.
- Jude Hinumdum as Basil, another top employee at OnQ who also joins Dante's independent media company.
- Lotlot Bustamante as Mona dela Peña, the HR manager at Soleil.
- Mike Liwag as PSMS Ramos, a senior police non-commissioned officer.
- Miggy Campbell as Jack, an individual involved in Tori's schemes.
- Joel Molina as PSMS C. Esteves, a police officer who secretly works for Tori.

=== Guest cast ===
- Martin Escudero as Damien Calvento, a film director, which Tori hired him to sabotage Tim and Poch's lives and relationship.
- Jong Cuenco as Dr. Max Landicho, a doctor at Angel of Mercy Hospital with a history of allegedly sexually harassing female nurses, including Ria, while covering up the evidence.
- Aya Fernandez as Cheska Landicho, Brandon's ex-wife.
- Elyson de Dios as Kurt, an employee at Here Cafe & Bar.

== Music ==
=== High Street (Original Soundtrack) ===
Star Music have released a digital soundtrack album on June 8, 2024, entitled, High Street (Original Soundtrack), to accompany the TV series. This soundtrack includes songs that were featured in this TV series. The main theme song is Kalma Kahit Magulo (lit. 'Keep Calm Even When It's Chaotic') by Various Artists.

High Street (Original Soundtrack)

Soundtrack album by Various artists
- Released: June 8, 2024
- Genre: Various
- Length: 27:31
- Label: Star Music
- Producers: Jonathan Manalo; Nameless Kids; Viktor Nhiko Sabiniano; Moophs

High Street (Original Soundtrack) track listing
No.	Title	Writer(s)	Artist	Length
1.	"Kalma Kahit Magulo"	Icidor Kobe So, Rob Blackburn, Rox Santos, Jonathan Manalo	Colet Vergara & Jhoanna Robles of Bini, Juan Karlos	3:06
2.	"Still So In Love"	Viktor Nhiko Sabiniano	Nameless Kids	4:43
3.	"Aking Anghel"	Jeremy Eriq Glinoga, Zephanie Dimaranan, Rox Santos, Jonathan Manalo	Jeremy G	3:54
4.	"Aking Tangi"	Drei Sugay	Drei Sugay	4:33
5.	"Back Again"	Angia Laurel, Christopher James Moore Lopez, Viktor Nhiko Sabiniano	Angia	3:57
6.	"Ano? Bakit? Paano?"	Rox Santos, Rico Gonzales	Lyka Estrella	4:09
7.	"Kalma Kahit Magulo - Reprise"	Icidor Kobe So, Rob Blackburn, Rox Santos, Jonathan Manalo	Gelo Rivera & Mikki Claver of BGYO, Maymay Entrata	3:06
Total length:				27:31

== Episodes ==
No.	Title	TV title	Original air date (Note: iWantTFC shows two episodes first in advance before it broadcasts on TV.)
1	"Danger Lurks"	"New Era"	May 13, 2024
2	"A New Team"	"Stalker"	May 14, 2024
3	"Father-Son Reunion"	"Wrath"	May 15, 2024
4	"Sabotaged"	"Fired"	May 16, 2024
5	"Facing the Devil"	"Face to Face"	May 17, 2024
6	"Sisters"	"Warning"	May 20, 2024
7	"Abducted"	"Abducted"	May 21, 2024
8	"The Hackers"	"Connivance"	May 22, 2024
9	"Person of Interest"	"Set-Up"	May 23, 2024
10	"Detained"	"Jailed"	May 24, 2024
11	"Released"	"Deep Fake"	May 27, 2024
12	"New Targets"	"Boyfriend"	May 28, 2024
13	"New Development"	"Snatcher"	May 29, 2024
14	"Identified"	"Hallucination"	May 30, 2024
15	"Escape Attempt"	"Mastermind"	May 31, 2024
16	"Hardheaded"	"Panic"	June 3, 2024
17	"Almost There"	"Hideout"	June 4, 2024
18	"Bomb Threat"	"Bomb Threat"	June 5, 2024
19	"The Grand Escape"	"Missing"	June 6, 2024
William is nowhere to be found, causing such distress to Cecille and Tania. Tori’s group has succeeded in escaping William from the hospital. The police tried to convince Julio Soledad, who is William’s guard, but he only knows hours before his unconsciousness. At night, Sky attempted to find more evidence on her own. She went through the restricted hospital area and found William’s wristband.
20	"Another Death"	"Wristband"	June 7, 2024
At home, Brandon and Tania are still thinking about what’s been happening with William’s escape plan. Meanwhile, Sky tried to convince Gino on her phone, but he did not answer. In the morning, Sky and her friends were still thinking of a possible way to be safe after William had escaped. Sky finally convinces Gino and apologizes for falsely accusing him of his involvement. She gave Gino’s dad’s wristband to him. Moments later, he returns to the hospital and heads to the restricted area for more clues. Meanwhile, Julio was heading to the same area but was spooked when Gino saw him. Julio tried to run away, but he was shot by an unknown shooter. Sky and Dante had a conversation about William’s missing. Meanwhile, Tori and her group were able to cover up another piece of evidence, and before that, Julio helped her by sacrificing his life since he hid his alibi from the police for as long as possible.
21	"Family Portrait"	"Family Portrait"	June 10, 2024
Tim discovered the house that usually belonged to Ben Kong until his death ten years ago, but nothing suspicious about the family. Fortunately, he noticed some hidden places inside the house before he took Sky to work. Meanwhile, Poch impressed the film director with his acting skills auditioning for the romantic film. Sky was looking for clues at the hospital before William’s escape, but security told her its suspicion went to Cecile. Police were searching for a possible clue while being tracked on a security camera. Meanwhile, Z screamed for help, but the basement was fully soundproof. Then, she saw the picture of her brother, Archie. However, Wesley threatened Z that his group would make her brother suffer if she wasn’t quiet. At night, the police were pulled out without any signs of suspicion. Meanwhile, Gino heads to his old house to relive the nightmares William has made for his family.
22	"Nightmare"	"Nightmare"	June 11, 2024
While Gino is searching around the house, a lady, his family's maid, unexpectedly meets Gino and lets him stay for the night. Tim came home late and apologized to Poch due to their long shift at the police station. Gino is receiving such nightmares about his father, William, being inside the house. Roxy was suspicious of a nurse, as she felt like she was being harassed by a doctor. Tim and Emil had difficulty finding clues the following day as they needed the police to search again. Meanwhile, Gino asks his maid about a ghost being here somewhere, but her hidden information makes him suspicious. Sky discovers Cecille hasn’t rendered her services for over a year at a Women of Today Crisis Center.
23	"The Clan"	"Other Woman"	June 12, 2024
Roxy was conflicted and told Kevin she saw Nurse Issa being sexually harassed by Dr. Max in her workplace. Dante gave Wesley, Nikki, and Sky another scoop. Gino was finding secrets behind his old house while a maid witnessed him. Tori wasn’t satisfied that someone wasn’t presenting a product, so Ruth replaced that person. While Roxy is looking for clues about Doc Max, Sky is willing to help her with the incident. In Soleil, Tori was impressed when Becca presented the karaoke. Meanwhile, Gino asked the maid about his father at his house. The maid told him about William's monstrous actions toward her and her family, and Gino’s grandmother silenced her. Also, William’s uncle, Lucas, made William who he was, and he was poisoned by his evil ways. Later at night, Sky detects Brandon and thinks he is cheating on Tania, but Brandon tells her that the woman who kissed Brandon is his wife.
24	"Money Trap"	"Cash Loan"	June 13, 2024
Brandon told Sky that her mother knows they’re married and explained to her about that woman named Cheska that he and Tania filed for annulment against her, but they are careful not to get suspicious. Tania, Ria, Elmo, and Edith were having dinner together while being tracked by Tori on Tania’s company-issued phone, which she gave her. After the dinner party, Tania met Edmund about money issues between him and Brandon. Roxy asked Ria about sexual harassment in her workplace, and she answered that she had experienced it, and then she told about her failed complaint against Dr. Max. Meanwhile, at the prison in the United States, Archie attempted to call Roxy but was stopped by some inmates, and he was careful not to get into trouble. Elmo and Edith conversed with each other about what had happened for the past five years and its presence. Tania confronted Brandon about the debts they’d received, and Tori managed to make another problem before that.
25	"The Secret Room"	"Secret Room"	June 14, 2024
Sky was trying to find answers at the convent and asked one of its sisters about William, but she provided no evidence. Wesley meets Kenjie again, and Kenji advises him on being Sky’s lover. Moments later, he researched Kenji and dug dirt on social media while Nikki was able to steal Sky’s second phone. Meanwhile, Gino was looking for answers about Lucas's abuse. Later, he heads to the old statue and tries to look for Alma. Then, he heads to the abandoned Villa Acosta, where he finds Lucas' records in the secret room. Little did he realize that William was held in the hidden underground at the hospital.
26	"Mislead"	"Obsession"	June 17, 2024
At William’s hideout, he receives a call from Tori for an update after he escapes from above and finds out where Z is held. Meanwhile, Cecille finds out what Gino is doing, and they argue with each other over family insane issues. Z was still held hostage by Tori’s group as William was in near full recovery to find her. Sky converses with her mother about Sister Fatima’s involvement with Cecille, while Tori manipulates Brandon into thinking he is donating his money to the other poor person. The following morning, Gino tells Sky about the possibilities behind his family’s insane issues, mostly Cecille, as she was called by Sister Fatima, that Sky was following her. Tim tells Gino and Sky that William has left the country.
27	"Out of the Country"	"Frustration"	June 18, 2024
News spread that William had escaped to Malaysia, sending shockwaves throughout the country. Sanya and Kenjie had lunch with their families, showing their progress in selling sardines for the Juan Canning Corp. At the restaurant, Poch was worried that William might come back to get him, but Tim calmed him down. PCOL Concha wanted Gino and Cecille to cooperate with the case of William’s escape. Elmo, Edith, and their group went to the restaurant, but when Edith saw Poch, she still felt uncomfortable with his and Tim’s relationship and wanted to go to other restaurants. At the same place where the man reported William’s escape, which turned out to be a fake alibi, he received money from Tori to pay his debts. Sky confronted Cecille about William while accusing her of her involvement. Later that night, Sky emotionally talks with Dante about a possible way to bring justice for her twin sister’s death.
28	"Hostage"	"Hostage"	June 19, 2024
Sky and Tania were suspicious about Brandon’s money savings. Cecille is trying to head to Malaysia, but Gino tells her she’s under probation. She may realize that William has his allies helping him, but then she gets offended by what Gino says to William. The following day, Wesley and Nikki realized that Sky had lost her trust in them. At the Juan Canning Corp, Sky is supposed to talk to Kenjie, but she is suspicious about Temyong, who wants to meet him. When Kenjie arrived, he was unexpectedly taken hostage by Temyong. Meanwhile, at the cafe, Sanya and Roxy are talking about the wedding when Sanya receives a text message from Sky, causing both of them to panic. Sky asked Temyong about what had happened while working with the company, and he answered that his truck had been in an accident. The company received many complaints, but he was suspended. Temyong tried to end Kenjie, but securities came in time to pin him down. Kenjie’s father, Fred, plans to sue him. Sky talks to Emil about William’s arrival in Malaysia, but there are no updates from either country, and they are on high alert, which has a possibility that he is still somewhere in this country. She also asked about updates regarding Z, and Emil will ensure they’re looking deeper into that case.
29	"Rebels"	"Vigilant"	June 20, 2024
Sky interviewed some workers about the toxic working conditions at the Juan Canning Corp and tried to call Kenjie at night. Sky somewhat believes Temyong and hopes that he’s freed. Dante was impressed by Sky’s articles about toxic working conditions. Wesley and Nikki tried to help Sky, but she didn’t fall for their interests, leaving them at a loss for words. Edith complains to Tim about his relationship with Poch, but Tim has had enough of her words and is convinced that he will protect Poch for his safety. Meanwhile, at the hospital, Kevin was open mind about spending time with Roxy. At night on OnQ, Wesley successfully convinces Sky to help him with William Acosta’s case. However, Sky has a suspicion about Wesley’s computer hacking experience. On the following day, at Poch’s house, he was successfully accepted for his role on the project by the director. At the office of Juan Canning Corp, an angry Fred complained to Sky about the article she posted and decided to kick her out of his office. However, Kenjie and Sanya told Sky that they helped each other by offering fair payments and treatment to every worker. Gino got off at work, and then he found his mother lying down from her drug overuse at his home.
30	"Runaway Groom"	"Cancelled"	June 21, 2024
Cecille gained consciousness after Gino called the ambulance for an emergency. Kenjie gives good news to Sky, stating that his parents have brought back former workers and discovered that there’s an amorality in the middle management. He decided to leave Juan Canning Corp. Sky was able to write an article update regarding Juan Canning Corp’s toxic management. Wesley has quietly watched every move at the restaurant on Sky and her close friends, mostly Tim. The following day, at supposedly Kenjie’s and Sanya’s wedding, moments before the disaster, Kenjie discovered a disturbing video. Heading back to Sanya’s condo, Kenjie told Sanya that he won’t be able to marry her, causing her emotional stress. Sanya’s close friends tried to calm her down. At night, Tania started to get suspicious again of Brandon. The following day, Wesley and Nikki were given updates at Tori's house so that Z could calm herself down. Wesley told Tori that he had discovered that Kenjie had an alt-account on the other website, showing the other side of him. So, Kenjie was blackmailed by Wesley. Tori’s group was planning to manipulate Kenjie for more information.
31	"Blackmail"	"Anger"	June 24, 2024
Kenjie and Sanya were conflicted and devastated after a runaway groom. Wesley threatened Kenjie via text message that he needed big money or else he would upload a video. Sky took Sanya to her house and had her stay for a while. The following day, Kenjie started to get even more devastated. When Ria talked to Roxy at the hospital regarding Archie, she and her son didn’t want any involvement with him. Wesley asked Sky about the other side of Kenjie, and Sky started to get a little defensive, not knowing the information. The executives of OnQ had a board meeting about the loss of money for the company and decided to merge with another media company, leaving concerns on Dante. At night, Tim’s family and Poch were having dinner, but Tim and Poch were having an uncomfortable moment with Tim’s mother, Edith. At home, Tania was enraged at Brandon after Cheska blackmailed Brandon over money borrowed. She decided to kick Brandon out until he brought Cheska to her house. Kenjie could give the money to a disguised Wesley, and Wesley threatened him once more before he took off.
32	"Two-Faced"	"Two-Faced"	June 25, 2024
After a conflicting situation between Sky, Brandon, and Tania, Sky and Sanya talked to each other about what had happened to them. Tim and Poch tried contacting Kenjie the following day, but he did not answer. Later, Tim told Sky that William was seen on the yacht, but there’s no further update on his traces. At Soleil, Tori calmed Tania and gave her advice for some help. At night, Kevin was able to help Roxy take care of Riley over a bead getting stuck in his nose. Meanwhile, at Sky’s house, Brandon tries to talk to Tania again, but she refuses to hear him. Brandon had a private talk with two men who wanted money. They’ll threaten Brandon if he doesn’t pay them back. So, Brandon calls Tori to help pay the money back to those men they met. At a nightclub, Kenjie tells a guy he and Wesley met to return his money because of his extortion. He beats him up over such refusal and gets arrested by the police. Afterward, Gino helps Kenjie bailout, but Kenjie tells him he was extorted by a guy they don’t know, Wesley, and wants to help. The following day, Gino and Kenjie ask Tim to track down the extortionist. However, a disguised Wesley has covered up his tracks before it could’ve been caught. Meanwhile, in the woods, Brandon talks privately in a car with Tori for help.
33	"Exposed"	"Shocked"	June 26, 2024
Tania has received a big money grant thanks to Tori. At the convent, Cecille talks to Sister Fatima about her drug overuse and tries to find peace with William again. Fatima started to feel threatened after she heard the name from Cecille. Sky asks Tania to have a conversation with Brandon over the problems they’ve faced. Brandon and Tania have finally settled each other and promised to clean up their problematic actions. Sky faced another nightmare about William strangling her to death, but Sanya woke her up and calmed her down. Sister Fatima has scheduled Sky for a meeting at the convent. In William’s secret basement at the hospital, his recovery is still Improving, and he wants to request a weapon for protection. At the other hospital, Kevin was happy to hear from Roxy that her son was doing fine after an accident yesterday. At Poch’s house, Tim wanted Poch to keep a secret from Sanya about Kenjie. The following day, Sky and Sister Fatima have talks about William and Cecille. Sky was shocked to hear about Cecille’s disturbing past, and Sister Fatima wanted Sky to help Cecille and Gino from William’s abusive actions. At night on OnQ, Sky was researching Cecille’s past when a sudden exposure of Kenjie was posted across social media. Sanya found out about the posted video, and she was utterly disturbed. The following day, after a meeting at Soleil, Tania and Tori discussed the current situation for the past couple of days (mostly Kenjie’s alt-account). Then, Tania completely fainted while Tori showed her no remorseful face.
34	"Out of Wedlock"	"Discovery"	June 27, 2024
Tori has taken Tania to the hospital, and Sky has finally met Tori for the first time. While Tori tracks down the family, Sky has ensured Tania will have another child. Poch has unfortunate news from the director that the filming has a setback, and the producer backed out. At Sky’s house, Sky has concerns about Sanya and an unfortunate feeling about Kenjie. Later, Sky researched the Acostas, and found a disturbing truth about Cecille. Meanwhile, at dinnertime, Kevin was supposed to propose to Roxy, but she wasn’t ready yet. Archie’s parole was granted and deported from the United States. At the hospital, Ria has an uneasy feeling that Dr. Max is going to abuse her sexually. Kenjie has decided to leave his family behind, and go on his terms instead of moving to the United States. The next morning, at Tori’s house, Tori, Wesley, and Nikki gave each other on Sky that she was going to St. Gertrudes Convent. At the convent, Sky told Sister Fatima about Cecille getting abused while being four months pregnant before she and William got married.
35	"Bittersweet Truth"	"Truth"	June 28, 2024
When Cecille found Sky at the convent, she decided to leave before the situation getting worse. Tori made sure that Z should be kept underground until William fully recovered, and received an update from Nikki about Sky. Sister Fatima convinced Cecille to tell the bittersweet truth to Gino about William, causing Cecille into a panic mode. At the hospital, Sky and Tania have a conversation about Gino, and figure on what to do. At Cecille’s house, Gino saw her mother drunk and argued each other on whether the bittersweet truth would come out or not. At night, Archie finally saw Roxy, but instead of meeting her, he decided to go back to his old house. While looking at his old stuff, he received a video from an unknown contact. Little did he know, he saw a video about his sister, Z, being held hostage. Meanwhile, Sky tells Gino to find proof of the bittersweet truth that William is not his real father.
36	"Little Sister"	"Sister"	July 1, 2024
Gino has decided to get back to Cecille’s house to get William’s stuff to get a DNA test to find out the truth, and his mother fails to stop him. Meanwhile, Cheska continues to blackmail Brandon by making him give her one million pesos as planned by Nikki. The next morning, Cecille decided to meet Tori. They had a conversation about William and Z, and Cecille wanted Z to be killed or else she’ll expose Tori that she’s William’s half-sister. Tori remembered back when William was charged with sexual molestation and rape cases five years ago. William had sold all of its assets to Tori. Tori’s real name is Corazon. William’s escape doesn’t go as planned when he’s paralyzed, and for the past five years before the present, Tori helps William to the hospital for his recovery. Gino does the DNA testing to search for the truth.
37	"Trauma"	"Harassment"	July 2, 2024
William tries to strangle the nurse thinking she is Sky, but he finds out and tries to calm himself down. Tori refuses to call Cecille and calls Brandon instead. She decides to pretend to help him again by making him get big money from her. At OnQ, Dante wanted Sky and her team to research a drug. Brandon signs Tori’s contract by selling all his assets to her. Poch unexpectedly arrived at Tim’s house to have dinner with him and his family. Poch has an uneasy feeling about the director that he attempted to sexually assault him, but he escaped from the building. Poch decided to find another director. Elmo and Edith argued each other over Tim and Poch’s relationships. Meanwhile, at Sky’s house, Sanya finds Kenjie and wants him to get out. However, Kenjie has some emotional words before he leaves the house. At Poch’s house, Tim and Poch make an argument without knowing about the traumatic situation. The next morning, Poch found a new director, but little did he know that he fell into his trap with Damien and Nikki, whom she decided to ruin the relationship.
38	"Administrative Leave"	"Drug Raid"	July 3, 2024
The police planned a raid on a drug party at Club La Piaza. Poch would be going into a party, but little did he know, it was the same party that the police were raiding. While Sky’s team searches for drugs in that place, Archie calls Sky and warns her about finding Z. Poch had arrived at the client’s party, and he was drugged by one of those clients working with Damien when she put drugs in Poch’s drink. Police has entered the plaza while Damien ran away and Poch collapsed. Tim unexpectedly finds Poch and brings him outside, but Esteves sees them. Sky sees Poch, and takes him into his house via Taxi. At Poch’s house, Tim and Poch had an emotional argument. Nikki’s plan has succeeded in which will be resulted in Tim in an administrative leave from the PNP. The next day, Brandon regretfully tells Tania that he sold his assets and Cheska ran away with big money. Their annulment was not granted. Tania decided to leave him. Tim talks with Sky about Poch. Sky finds that Tim had discovered that the house, where Z was held, was owned a few months ago by Corazon Garcia.
39	"Rescued"	"Gunned Down"	July 4, 2024
While Sky looks at the record of the Acosta family, the name “C. Garcia” is also included in the family’s record. At the hospital, Riley doesn’t want to go to daycare, so instead, Kevin decides to take care of him. Meanwhile, Sky decided to track down Simon indicating where he is heading. While Kevin, Roxy, and Riley were leaving, Archie saw them. Simon took Z to a bathroom and decided to attempt to sexually assault her. However, Z resisted and tried to escape just in time for Sky to move in to save her. Nikki realized what Sky was going to do. Tim was in the same area, helped Sky, and called for backup. Simon shot Z and Tim, but they were injured. Police backup arrived and took down Jack. Nikki and Wesley went to the house, and Sky suspiciously saw their faces.
40	"Out of Danger"	"Blaming"	July 5, 2024
Sky took Z and Tim to the hospital, and they will fortunately be recovered. Gino and Sanya have arrived to find out what happened, but Archie arrives furiously at Sky for not listening to him. Meanwhile, Roxy, Riley, and Kevin arrived at Roxy’s house and continued to begin relationships. When Kevin left, Sky called Roxy telling her that Z was safe and Archie arrived back. Tania called Sky about the situation they faced and decided to leave Brandon and his house to head to Tim’s house. Sanya decided to head to Roxy’s house. While Tim and Poch have private talks, they got secretly caught by Esteves. Roxy told Ria about Archie’s arrival and decided to not meet him. Tori was infuriated at Wesley and Nikki about Z but decided to let them find another way to take down Sky.
41	"Reunited"	"Pained"	July 8, 2024
42	"New Owner"	"Vengeance"	July 9, 2024
43	"A Product of Sin"	"Real Father"	July 10, 2024
44	"The Secret Door"	"Secret Door"	July 11, 2024
45	"Enemy of the Enemy"	"William"	July 12, 2024
46	"He's Dead"	"Kill Sky"	July 15, 2024
47	"Start Anew"	"Corazon Garcia"	July 16, 2024
48	"Implicated Wife"	"In Denial"	July 17, 2024
49	"Baby Sister"	"Sabotage"	July 18, 2024
50	"The Breakup"	"Breakup"	July 19, 2024
51	"Among Us"	"Fake Identities"	July 22, 2024
52	"A Favor"	"One by One"	July 23, 2024
53	"The Instigator"	Daddy Archie	July 24, 2024
54	"Obsessed"	"Walkout"	July 25, 2024
55	"Meet the Parents"	"Same Person"	July 26, 2024
56	"The Exposé"	"Target"	July 29, 2024
57	"Entrapment"	"Fake Documents"	July 30, 2024
58	"Back to The Force"	"Subpoena"	July 31, 2024
59	"Cyber Libel"	"Wrong Medicine"	August 1, 2024
60	"Busted"	"Libel Case"	August 2, 2024
61	"Surprised"	"Happy Birthday"	August 5, 2024
62	"The Reason"	"Revelation"	August 6, 2024
63	"Murder Attempt"	"Accomplice"	August 7, 2024
64	"Set Up"	"Evil Plan"	August 8, 2024
65	"False Statement"	"Warrant of Arrest"	August 9, 2024
66	"Arrest Warrant"	"Protected"	August 12, 2024
67	"Surrender"	"Surrender"	August 13, 2024
68	"Dismissed"	"Case Dismissed"	August 14, 2024
69	"Guilty"	"Confrontation"	August 15, 2024
70	"Failed Mother"	"Reconciliation"	August 16, 2024
71	"Family of Foes"	"True Children"	August 19, 2024
72	"Scapegoat"	"Sorry To All"	August 20, 2024
73	"Hard Drive"	"Manhunt"	August 21, 2024
74	"The Accomplices"	"Abandoned"	August 22, 2024
75	"Meet Up"	"Deadly Obsession"	August 23, 2024
76	"Grieving Mother"	"Worst Karma"	August 26, 2024
77	"Unreciprocated"	"Ultimate Revenge"	August 27, 2024
78	"Twisted Justice"	"Tania Or Baby Star"	August 28, 2024
79	"The Bomb"	"Death For All"	August 29, 2024
80	"Finale"	"The Final Destination"	August 30, 2024

== Production ==
=== Development ===
Based on the actors' discussion on the video by ABS-CBN, High Street will take place five years after the graduation of Northford High School, and it could infuse a whole lot of maturity.

In early April, Dreamscape Entertainment released a series of videos on its social media accounts that shows the preparations being made by the directors and cast members such as the script reading and look test.

During the High Street Story Conference on March 26, 2024, Andrea Brillantes admitted about feeling pressured following the success of Senior High saying, “I’m excited but I also have mixed emotions. Because whenever a show has a part two, there’s always pressure to make it better or for it to be as good as the first one.”

=== Casting ===
On March 26, 2024, it was confirmed that the original cast of Senior High, Andrea Brillantes, Juan Karlos Labajo, Zaijian Jaranilla, Xyriel Manabat, Elijah Canlas, Daniela Stranner, Miggy Jimenez, Gela Atayde, and Tommy Alejandrino will reprise their roles. Angel Aquino, Mon Confiado, Gerald Madrid, Angeli Bayani, Ana Abad Santos, Rans Rifol, and Inka Magnaye will also reprise their roles. New cast members also include Argus Aspiras, Ralph de Leon, AC Bonifacio, Harvey Bautista, Romnick Sarmenta, and Dimples Romana.

Production have started around early April, and Dreamscape Entertainment have been able to have a glimpse of its behind-the-scenes footage on the first day of taping.

== Release ==
=== Promotion ===
An announcement was released on March 21, 2024, showing pictures of the cast of Senior High. A teaser trailer was released on April 23, 2024, across social media platforms.

In preparation for the series premiere, a 5-episode web series Life After Senior High was released on April 22, 2024, via ABS-CBN Entertainment's YouTube channel and Dreamscape Entertainment's Facebook page showing the main characters during the five-year span to High Street.

The official trailer was released on May 1, 2024. On May 9, 2024, the cast of High Street unveiled the official poster during the Bida Kapamilya event in SM Pampanga's Amphitheater.

=== Broadcast ===
High Street premiered on May 13, 2024, on Kapamilya Channel, with simulcast on A2Z and TV5, and streaming on Kapamilya Online Live. It is streaming with advance episodes first on iWantTFC on May 11.

== Reception ==
High Street opened with 223,053 concurrent live viewers on YouTube, streamed through Kapamilya Online Live. According to Nielsen NUTAM People Survey, the pilot episode of the series garnered 4.8% nationwide ratings.
