= Boyette: Not a Girl Yet =

2020 Philippine comedy film

- Official release poster
- Directed by: Jumbo Albano
- Screenplay by: Jumbo Albano
- Produced by: Kara U. Kintanar
- Starring: Zaijian Jaranilla; Maris Racal; Iñigo Pascual
- Cinematography: Mackie Galvez
- Edited by: Benjamin Gonzales Tolentino; Noah Tonga
- Music by: Emerzon Texon
- Production company: Star Cinema
- Distributed by: CineXpress
- Release date: November 27, 2020
- Running time: 111 minutes
- Country: Philippines
- Language: Filipino

Boyette: Not a Girl Yet is a 2020 Philippine comedy film starring Zaijian Jaranilla, Iñigo Pascual and Maris Racal, directed by Jumbo Albano. The film is under Star Cinema. It is about a college student who will pretend to be a straight to get him closer to his crush. The film was released on KTX and iWantTFC as well as Sky Cable PPV and Cignal PPV on November 27, 2020.

== Plot ==
A college freshman Boyette (Zaijian Jaranilla) pretends to be straight to get closer to his homophobic crush Charles (Iñigo Pascual), motivating himself to join a dance club. While he's pretending, a lot of girls like him, including Nancy (Maris Racal).

== Cast ==
- Zaijian Jaranilla as Boyette Camacho
- Maris Racal as Nancy
- Iñigo Pascual as Charles
- Joey Marquez as Tatay Boy Camacho
- Alma Moreno as Nanay Suzette Camacho
- Jairus Aquino as Pia
- Dominic Ochoa as Alfred
- Ketchup Eusebio as Kuya Bitoy Camacho
- Mel Feliciano as Sir Cei
- Phi Palmos as Catriona
- Ji-An Lachica as Kylir
- Andre Garcia as Brett Camacho
- Christian Antolin as Baduding
- Lara Fortuna as Macy

== Production ==
Jaranilla said that Albano has convinced him because the character that Albano offered to him was so different from his role Santino on May Bukas Pa and to see him not just as Santino. He also said that he wants to show others that he can also able to portray other roles. Albano said that the film is inspired by his own story.
