= Senior High (TV series) =

2023–24 Philippine television mystery drama series

- Season 1 promotional poster
- Genre: Teen drama; Mystery; Coming-of-age
- Written by: Kay Conlu Brondial; Bridgette Rebucca; Jason Mondragon
- Directed by: Onat Diaz; Andoy Ranay; Jojo Saguin; Rico Navarro
- Starring: Andrea Brillantes; Kyle Echarri; Juan Karlos Labajo; Elijah Canlas; Zaijian Jaranilla; Xyriel Manabat; Daniela Stranner
- Music by: Idonnah Villarico; Rommel Villarico
- Opening theme: "Bazinga" by SB19
- Country of origin: Philippines
- Original languages: Filipino; English
- No. of seasons: 2
- No. of episodes: 105 (list of episodes)

Production
- Executive producers: Carlo Katigbak; Cory Vidanes; Laurenti Dyogi; Roldeo Endrinal; Jamie Lopez
- Producers: Rosselle Soldao-Ganaban; Minelle Nielo-Espiritu; Camille Rosales-Navarro
- Production location: Metro Manila
- Cinematography: Maria Francesca Lee; Mark Joshua Tirona
- Editors: Ray Ann Kristelle Endaya-Reyes; Zara Terrado-Vidallo; Maydelle Marcial; Omar Cervantes; John Ryan Bonifacio
- Camera setup: Single camera
- Running time: 23-39 minutes
- Production company: Dreamscape Entertainment

Original release
- Network: Kapamilya Channel (Note: The series also aired on A2Z (every Monday, Tuesday and Thursday during the PBA season), Jeepney TV, Kapamilya Online Live, TV5 and worldwide via The Filipino Channel.) iWantTFC
- Release: August 28, 2023 – January 19, 2024

Related
- High Street

Senior High is a Philippine mystery teen drama television series released on iWantTFC and aired on Kapamilya Channel. Directed by Onat Diaz and Andoy Ranay, it starred by Andrea Brillantes, Kyle Echarri, Juan Karlos Labajo, Elijah Canlas, Zaijian Jaranilla, Xyriel Manabat, and Daniela Stranner. It premiered on August 28, 2023, on the network's Primetime Bida line up. The series concluded on January 19, 2024, with a total of 105 episodes.

A sequel to the series, High Street, premiered in 2024.

== Plot ==
Luna’s death sparks a scandal at the prestigious Northford High. Though officially ruled as a suicide, her twin sister, Sky, believes there’s more to the story. As she investigates, Sky uncovers disturbing truths, revealing that those around her are entangled in lies and hidden desires. Throughout the school year, Sky discovers unsettling details, including a video showing Z bullying Luna. Shocked, Sky confides in her mother, Tania, who is devastated by what Luna endured. Meanwhile, Archie learns that Harry is the biological father of Sky and Luna and shares the news with Sky after a drug-related incident. The school is soon put on high alert due to illegal activities involving Obet. Harry’s troubled relationship with his second wife, Sasha, is exposed, as she briefly leaves him before returning after a settlement.

As Sky, Obet, and Lydia search for evidence in the school’s CCTV footage, they discover suspicious activity. During exams, Kenjie frames Sky by throwing a cheat sheet at her, leading to her expulsion. However, the evidence is overturned, and Kenjie apologizes to both Sky and Sanya, restoring their friendship. Sky is allowed to retake her exams and passes. At Sanya’s birthday party, Z attempts to humiliate Sky but is thwarted thanks to witnesses like Obet and Kenjie. As Sky grows closer to Gino, she remembers her late sister, Luna. The following day, Principal Amanda informs Sky that her tuition is unpaid. Meanwhile, rumors spread that Luna was pregnant, allegedly with Gino’s child, leading to a scandal that shakes the community and damages Gino’s reputation.

William dismisses Harry for mishandling the situation, while Lydia uncovers that her son, Tonio, has escaped. Harry soon learns that Darius Soledad is Tonio’s boss and discovers that Sasha is cheating on him with Darius. Tim wrestles with his feelings for Poch, while his parents, Edith and Elmo, struggle with marriage issues. Sky insists on DNA tests to determine Luna’s baby’s father. Gino agrees, but his parents block him from participating. William manipulates the situation, while Gino’s mother, Cecille, urges him to flee after William becomes violent. At the same time, Mr. Castrodes claims to be Luna’s baby’s father, adding to the chaos. As tensions rise, Poch reveals that William was his sugar daddy and warns Tim, who narrowly escapes an attack ordered by William. Sky, Tim, and Obet uncover shocking evidence linking William and Mr. Castrodes to illegal activities, including sexual trafficking. William’s attempts to cover up his crimes fail, leading to his arrest. However, the trauma continues as Luna's ghost haunts Z. Harry accidentally killed Obet after Obet believed Z killed Luna, leading to Sky’s rage towards Harry.

As graduation approaches, the truth behind Luna’s death is finally revealed: Acosta was the one who pushed Luna from the building. The incident happened after Luna and Z had a confrontation because of Acosta. Luna, who was pregnant with the governor's son Gino, asked Z to stop bothering her or else she will reveal that she witnessed Acosta's abuse to the latter by grooming her. Acosta then found Luna and Z on the veranda, and after Luna confronted and threatened him because of what he did to Z, he strangled and pushed Luna from the building. Z, manipulated by William, gave a false alibi, framing herself as Luna’s killer. In the climax, William attempts to kill Z, but Harry sacrifices himself to save her. Sky confronts William on the rooftop where Luna died. In a final struggle, William falls to his presumed death. The nightmare seems to be over as the students and their families begin to heal, though scars remain.

At graduation, the Northford seniors celebrate their accomplishments while mourning the losses of Luna and Obet. In a surprising twist, William is revealed to have survived the fall and awakens with a renewed thirst for revenge, an unseen visitor gives him the details concerning Sky's whereabouts. Thus, it gives way for a new era of a menacing nightmare and a new era of horror.

== Cast and characters ==
Cast

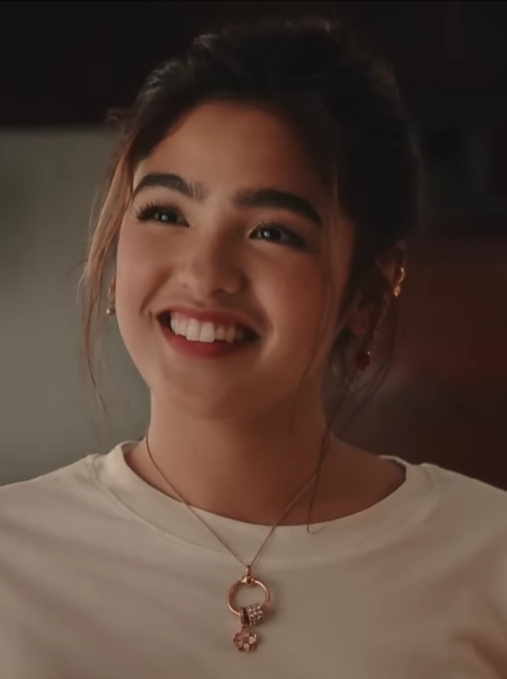
Andrea Brillantes

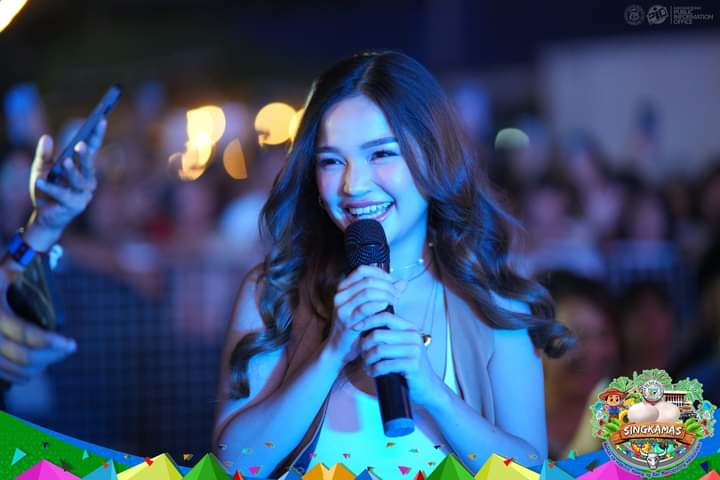
Xyriel Manabat

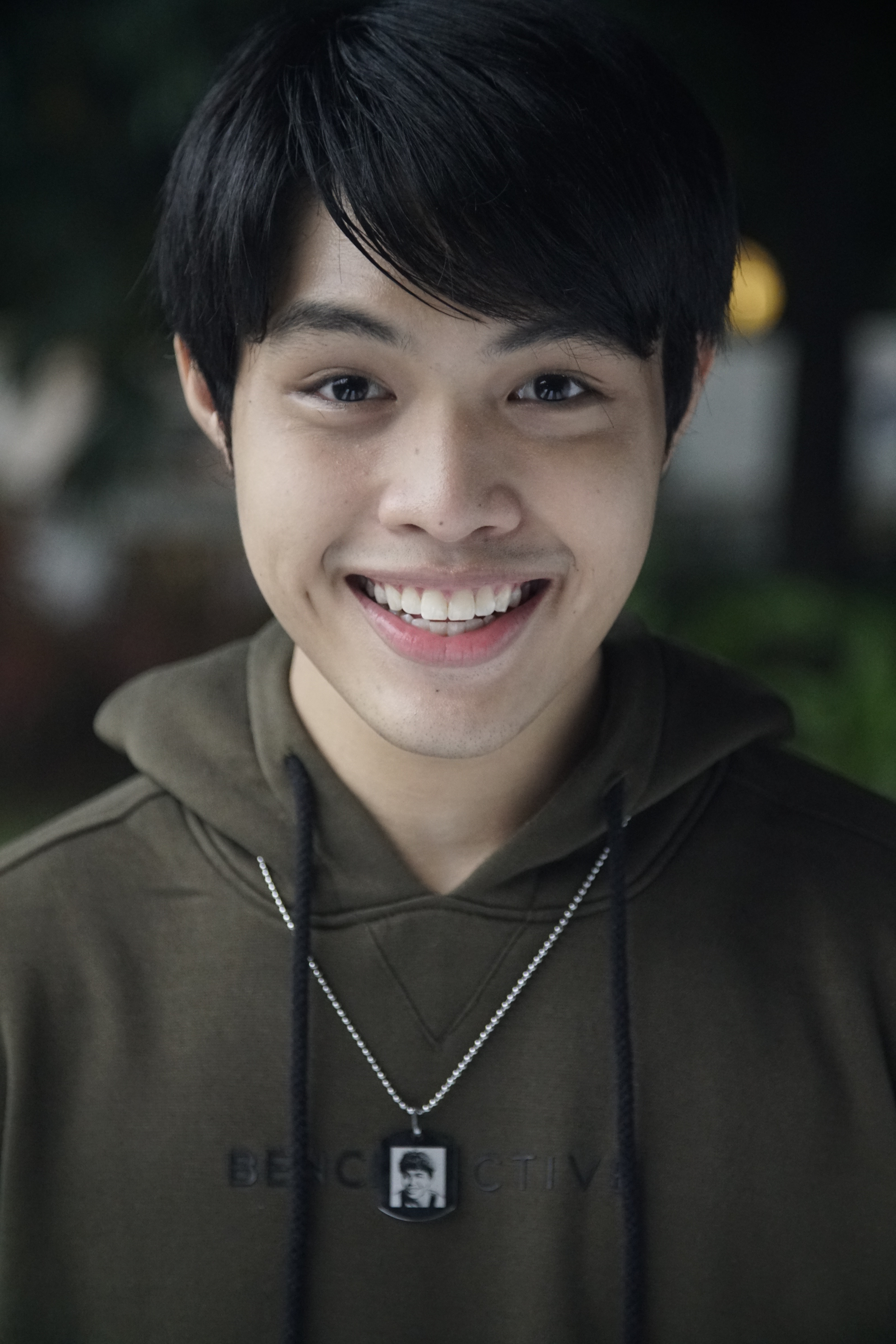
Elijah Canlas

=== Main cast ===
- Andrea Brillantes as Sky Love Cruz & Luna Amore Cruz (Note: Harry Aguerro is their biological father, but their legal last name is Cruz.)
- Kyle Echarri as Robert "Obet" Santana
- Juan Karlos Labajo as Gino Acosta
- Elijah Canlas as Archimedes "Archie" Aguerro
- Zaijian Jaranilla as Timothy "Tim" Castro
- Xyriel Manabat as Roxanne Fatima "Roxy" Cristobal
- Daniela Stranner as Zyra "Z" Aguerro

=== Recurring cast ===
- Sylvia Sanchez as Lydia "Amam" Geronimo

Obet and Tonio’s maternal grandmother

- Angel Aquino as Tania Mae Cruz (Note: Also sometimes spelled as Tanya in the English subtitles)
- Baron Geisler as Police Chief Col. Harry Aguerro
- Mon Confiado as Gov. William L. Acosta
- Miggy Jimenez as Pocholo "Poch" Robles
- Tommy Alejandrino as Kenjie Juan
- Gela Atayde as Sanya Alba
- Leo Martinez as Mariano (season 2; guest season 1)

Sasha’s father

- Desiree Del Valle as Sasha Aguerro
- Ana Abad Santos as Dr. Cecille Acosta
- Gerald Madrid as Elmo Castro
- Angeli Bayani as Editha "Edith" Borromeo-Castro
- Ryan Eigenmann as Police Maj. Insp. Darius Soledad
- Kean Cipriano as Brandon
- Rans Rifol as Ria Cristobal
- Rap Robes as Antonio "Tonio" Santana
- Kakki Teodoro as Principal Amanda Perino
- Inka Magnaye as Becca
- Floyd Tena as Vice-Principal Reginald Castrodes

=== Guest cast ===
- Grae Fernandez as Yosef Rosales (season 2)
- Lui Manansala as Rosario "Rosing" Cruz
- Raul Montesa as Domeng
- Nour Hooshmand as Yana Rosales
- Lance Carr (Note: Credited as Lance Justin Carr) as Paolo
- Justin de Dios as Jared (season 2)
- Ross Pesigan as Pong
- Maritess Joaquin as Menchie Robles
- Giovanni Baldisseri as General Arcilla
- Mike Liwag as Police Senior Master Sergeant Ramos

== Soundtrack ==
The series' main theme song is "Bazinga" by SB19.

== Broadcast ==
The series was pre-empted on A2Z on Wednesdays and Fridays to give way to the 2023–24 PBA season from November 8, 2023 to January 19, 2024 and continued on Kapamilya Channel, TV5 and Jeepney TV.

=== Reruns ===
It also would be airing re-runs on Kapamilya Channel and Kapamilya Online Live and ALLTV starting in January 2, 2026 via Kapamilya Gold beginning December 8, 2025 to May 1, 2026, replacing the reruns of Pamilya Sagrado, and it was replaced by the reruns of the sequel of this series.

== Reception ==
=== Online viewership ===
Throughout its run, Senior High was the most watched program on the streaming service iWantTFC. Within its first two weeks, the series garnered more than 38 million views across Facebook and YouTube. On January 19, 2024, the series received its highest online viewership with 225,118 concurrent viewers on Kapamilya Online Live. In January 2024, the series has accumulated over two billion combined views on TikTok.

=== Ratings ===
According to Nielsen NUTAM People Survey, the series attained its highest television rating on January 19, 2024 with an average of 6.7% aired in the third primetime slot since ABS-CBN shutdown on May 5, 2020. It surpassed the records set by the series The Broken Marriage Vow, Dirty Linen and Init sa Magdamag, which consistently recorded a peak rating of 6.2%, while airing on the same timeslot.

=== Awards and nominations ===
Award	Year	Category	Nominee(s)	Result	Ref.
VP Choice Awards	2024	TV Series of the Year (Primetime)	Senior High	Nominated	
VP Choice Awards	2024	TV Actress of the Year	Andrea Brillantes	Nominated	
VP Choice Awards	2024	TV Actor of the Year	Kyle Echarri	Nominated	
VP Choice Awards	2024	TV Supporting Actress of the Year	Xyriel Manabat	Nominated	
VP Choice Awards	2024	Breakthrough Star of the Year	Zaijan Jaranilla	Nominated	
VP Choice Awards	2024	Breakthrough Star of the Year	Miggy Jimenez	Nominated	
VP Choice Awards	2024	BL Love Team Of The Year	Zaijan Jaranilla and Miggy Jimenez	Won	
Platinum Stallion Media Awards	2024	Best Primetime Drama Actor	Elijah Canlas	Won	
Platinum Stallion Media Awards	2024	Best Primetime Supporting Actor	Miggy Jimenez	Won	
37th PMPC Star Awards for Television	2025	Best Drama Actress	Andrea Brilliantes	Nominated	
37th PMPC Star Awards for Television	2025	Best Drama Supporting Actress	Sylvia Sanchez	Nominated	
37th PMPC Star Awards for Television	2025	Best Drama Supporting Actor	Elijah Canlas	Won	
37th PMPC Star Awards for Television	2025	Best Drama Supporting Actor	Baron Geisler	Nominated	
37th PMPC Star Awards for Television	2025	Best Primetime TV Series	Senior High	Nominated	
37th PMPC Star Awards for Television	2025	Best Male TV Personality	Tommy Alejandrino	Nominated	
37th PMPC Star Awards for Television	2025	Best New Female TV Personality	Gela Atayde	Won	
38th PMPC Star Awards for Television	2025	Best Drama Actress	Andrea Brilliantes	Nominated	
38th PMPC Star Awards for Television	2025	Best Drama Supporting Actor	Zaijan Jaranilla	Nominated	

== Sequel ==
A sequel has been announced according to a tweet from Dreamscape head Eric John Salut with a working title "High Street". On March 22, 2024, Dreamscape Entertainment announced on their social media page that the title of the sequel is officially called High Street.

On March 25, 2024, Dreamscape Entertainment released the video of the story con held, and announced both the returning casts and additional casts to the sequel. The sequel will be directed by first season director, Onat Diaz, with director Lino Cayetano. The series was released on May 13, 2024.
