= Make It with You (TV series) =

2020 Philippine drama television series

- Genre: Drama; Romantic comedy
- Created by: Henry King Quitain
- Written by: Mark Duane Angos; Ceres Helga Barrios; Maan Fampulme; Mary Pearl Urtola
- Directed by: Cathy Garcia-Molina; Richard I. Arellano; Theodore C. Boborol; Mae Cruz-Alviar
- Starring: Enrique Gil; Liza Soberano
- Opening theme: "Make It with You" by Ben&Ben
- Composer: David Gates
- Country of origin: Philippines
- Original language: Filipino
- No. of seasons: 1
- No. of episodes: 45 (list of episodes)

Production
- Executive producers: Carlo Katigbak; Cory Vidanes; Laurenti Dyogi
- Producers: Des M. de Guzman; Maria Pamela Zyra T. Mendiola; Lindsay Anne Agor Dizon
- Production locations: Philippines; Croatia
- Editor: Kathryn Jerry Perez
- Running time: 30-45 minutes
- Production company: Star Creatives

Original release
- Network: ABS-CBN
- Release: January 13 – March 13, 2020

Make It with You is a Philippine romantic comedy television series broadcast by ABS-CBN. Directed by Cathy Garcia-Molina, Richard I. Arellano, Theodore C. Boborol and Mae Cruz-Alviar, it stars Enrique Gil and Liza Soberano. It aired on the network's Primetime Bida line up and worldwide on TFC from January 13 to March 13, 2020, replacing Starla and was replaced by Ang sa Iyo ay Akin.

== History ==
Make It with You was aired on ABS-CBN's Primetime Bida evening block every weeknights at 8:30 P.M. from January 13 to March 13, 2020 for a total of 45 episodes.

Due to the community quarantines caused by the COVID-19 pandemic in the Philippines, the drama's tapings were put on halt and its timeslot was replaced by reruns of On the Wings of Love from March 16, 2020 until the network ceased its free-to-air broadcast operations on May 5, 2020.

=== Cancellation ===
On June 4, 2020, it was announced that Make It with You was among the series cancelled, along with Pamilya Ko. This happened a month after ABS-CBN ceased its free-to-air broadcast operations on May 5, 2020, due to the cease and desist order issued by the National Telecommunications Commission (NTC) and Solicitor General Jose Calida. Director Theodore Boborol stated that "ABS-CBN was already badly hit by the pandemic, and then suffered a double blow when its renewal was not granted."

== Cast and characters ==
Main cast

- Enrique Gil as Gabriel "Gabo" Villarica
- Liza Soberano as Belinda "Billy" Dimagiba

Supporting cast

- Eddie Gutierrez as Agapito "Aga" Dimagiba
- Ian Veneracion as Theodore "Ted" Villarica
- Pokwang as Jessica "Jess" Villarica
- Herbert Bautista as Antonio "Tony" Dimagiba
- Katya Santos as Helen Catapang
- Fumiya Sankai as Yuta Himura
- Khalil Ramos as Stephen "Sputnik" Perez
- Katarina Rodriguez as Rio Isla
- Jeremiah Lisbo as Xian Isla
- Riva Quenery as Cassandra Dimagiba
- Vangie Labalan as Iluminada "Iling" Dimagiba
- Anthony Jennings as Rhamboy de Asis
- Daniela Stranner as Cheska Crismo (Note: Character's name was first spelled as Cheska per English subtitles, but later changed to Cesca.)
- Hero Bautista as Monsy Dimagiba
- Jong Cuenco as David Guiterrez

Guest cast

- Cindy Kurleto as Raquel Villarica
- Candy Pangilinan as Mariel Montengro-Dimagiba
- Richard Quan as Collin Yang
- Syra Mulleno as Elsa

== Production ==
Principal photography commenced in Croatia in late 2019.

== Reception ==
Kantar Media National TV Ratings (8:30PM PST)
Pilot Episode	Finale Episode	Peak	Average
27.4% January 13, 2020	26.2% March 13, 2020	28.9% January 14, 2020	26.3%

== See also ==
- List of programs broadcast by ABS-CBN
- List of ABS-CBN drama series
