= Miggy Jimenez =

Filipino actor and model (born 1999)

- Born: Enriko Mikhail Aguado Jimenez; January 23, 1999 (age 27); Philippines
- Occupations: Actor, model
- Years active: 2003–present
- Agent(s): GMA Network (2009–22; 2026); TV5 Network (2022–present); Star Magic (2023–present); Advanced Media Broadcasting System (2024–present)
- Known for: Senior High
- Height: 5 ft 10 in (1.78 m)

Enriko Mikhail "Miggy" Aguado Jimenez (born January 23, 1999) is a Filipino actor and model best known for his work in television and independent films. He began his career as a child host on the award-winning educational show Tropang Potchi (2009–2015), later transitioning into acting with roles in popular series such as Once Upon a Kiss (2015), and Senior High (2023–2024).

Jimenez has also made a mark in cinema with performances in Gameboys: The Movie (2021), Two and One (2022), and Your Mother's Son (2023).

== Early life ==
Enriko Mikhail Aguado Jimenez was born on January 23, 1999. He began his career at a young age, making his first appearance in the entertainment industry at just two months old. He majored in Digital Filmmaking.

== Career ==
Jimenez began his career in the entertainment industry at a young age. He first gained prominence as a host on the children's show Tropang Potchi on GMA Network, which aired from 2009 to 2015. Jimenez, along with his Tropang Potchi co-hosts, won the Best Children Show Host award at both the 27th and 28th PMPC Star Awards for Television. He also received the Outstanding Educational Program Host award at the Golden Screen TV Awards alongside co-hosts Miggs Cuaderno and Nomer Limatog. During this time, he also appeared in various GMA series such as Genesis, Beautiful Stranger, and Princess in the Palace.

In 2021, Jimenez portrayed Wesley in the Boys' love web series Gameboys, which was later adapted into a movie and renewed for a second season. For his performance in the film, he received a nomination for New Movie Actor of the Year at the 38th PMPC Star Awards for Movies. The same year, he portrayed the idealistic Jose Santos in the 2023 Cinemalaya entry Ang Duyan ng Magiting. He received the Best Ensemble Performance award at the 19th Cinemalaya Independent Film Festival, along with the rest of the cast. He also appeared in the films Kitty K7 and Two and One in 2022.

In 2023, he joined ABS-CBN's Star Magic, expressing his gratitude and excitement for the opportunity: "It is a dream come true".. He played Poch, a school bully with a complicated secret, in the teen mystery series Senior High and its sequel High Street. His performance earned him the Best Primetime Supporting Actor award at the Platinum Stallion National Media Awards. Jimenez also portrayed Oliver in the opening film of the EnlighTEN: The IdeaFirst Film Festival, Your Mother's Son. In 2025, he received a nomination for Best Supporting Actor at the 8th EDDY Awards.

== Artistry ==
=== Influences ===
Jimenez has mentioned John Lloyd Cruz as one of his acting influences.

=== Acting style and role choices ===
In a 2024 interview, Jimenez expressed his aspiration to be a character actor, saying he wants to be given roles with many layers. Jimenez shared that he no longer focuses on the gender of his characters, saying, "After a while, it gets too tiring to always be defending a queer character, not that it really needs rescuing. For me, choosing a project is all about the story. I believe that there are still a lot of stories about same-sex romance that we need to tell." Jimenez expressed his openness to various roles, saying, "I’m actually down with any characters because I love telling stories," when asked about the types of roles he wants to play.

== Personal life ==
Although Jimenez is often associated with queer roles, he identifies as a straight man.

== Filmography ==
Key
†	Denotes films that have not yet been released

=== Film ===
Year	Title	Role	Notes	Ref.
2002	Dekada '70	Rallyist	Guest Role	
2009	Patient X	Young Lukas	Support Role	
2021	Gameboys: The Movie	Wesley Torres	Support Role	
2022	Kitty K7	Charles	Support Role	
2022	Two and One	Tino	Main Role	
2023	Ang Duyan ng Magiting	Jose Santos	Support Role	
2023	Your Mother's Son	Oliver	Support Role	
2023	Pieta	Santi	Support Role	
2026	Midnight Girls	Danny	Support Role	
2026	Ang Magtutuli †	Diego	Main Role	

=== Television ===
Year	Title	Role	Notes	Ref.
2009–2015	Tropang Potchi	Host		
2010	Panday Kids	Sintoy	Credited as Migui Jimenez	
2011	Futbolilits	Dagul Cordones	Guest Role	
2012	Cielo de Angelina	Younger Marco	Guest Role	
2013	Genesis	Jerome Galvez	Guest Role	
2015	Second Chances	Leandro Cortez-Villacorta	Support Role	
2015	Once Upon a Kiss	Mickey Abueva	Support Role	
2015	Beautiful Strangers	James Mamaril	Support Role	
2015	Princess in the Palace	Joaquin Jacinto	Support Role	
2020	Gameboys	Wesley Torres	Support Role	
2022	Suntok sa Buwan	Carlton	Episodes 4–37	
2022; 2026	Family Feud	Himself		
2023–24	Senior High	Pocholo "Poch" Robles	Support Role	
2024	High Street	Pocholo "Poch" Robles	Main Role	
2024	Ang Himala ni Niño	Mike Gomez	Recurring Role; Episodes 26–33	
2025	Incognito	Sais		
2026	Someone, Someday	Ralph Rosales		

=== Anthologies ===
Year	Title	Role	Notes	Ref.
2014	Magpakailanman	Randy	Episode 75: "Pabrika ng Bata"	
2014	Magpakailanman	Utoy	Episode 91: "PNP: Pogi na pulis – The PO2 Mariano Flormata Jr. Story"	
2013	One Day Isang Araw	Isang's Older Brother	Recurring Role	
2016	Wagas	Kenneth	Episode 132: "One More Chance at Love: The Melissa Mendez Love Story"	
2016	Magpakailanman	Borge	Episode 172: "Pikot in Love"	
2017	Magpakailanman	Renad	Episode 220: "Beauty in Your Eyes: The Jinky 'Madam Kilay' Anderson Story"	

=== Music videos ===
Year	Song	Artist
2018	Kalawakan	Joslin

== Awards and nominations ==
Awards and nominations
Year	Award giving body	Category	Nominated work	Results
2013	27th PMPC Star Awards for Television	Best Children Show Host	Tropang Potchi	Won
2014	Golden Screen TV Awards	Outstanding Educational Program Host	Tropang Potchi	Won
2014	28th PMPC Star Awards for Television	Best Children's Show Host (or Hosts)	Tropang Potchi	Won
2015	29th PMPC Star Awards for Television	Best Children's Show Host(s)	Tropang Potchi	Nominated
2023	38th PMPC Star Awards for Movies	New Movie Actor of the Year	Gameboys: The Movie	Nominated
2023	19th Cinemalaya Independent Film Festival	Best Ensemble Acting	Ang Duyan ng Magiting	Won
2024	Platinum Stallion National Media Awards	Best Primetime Supporting Actor	Senior High	Won
2025	8th Entertainment Editors' Choice Awards	Best Supporting Actor	Your Mother's Son	Nominated
