= Xyriel Manabat filmography =

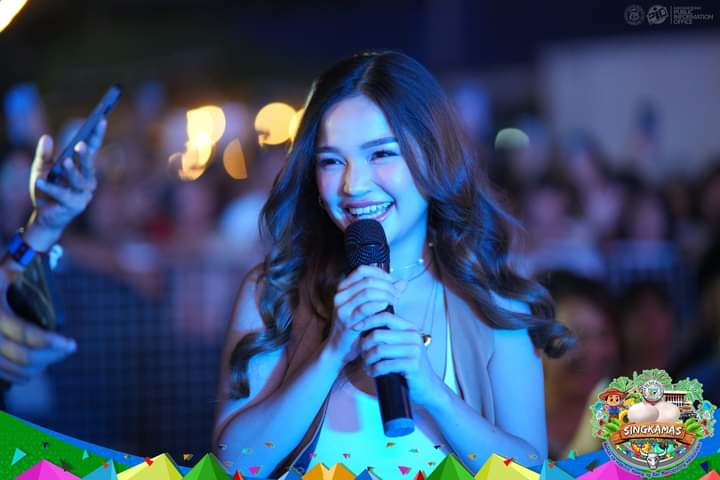
Manabat in 2024

Xyriel Manabat is a Filipino actress who first gained recognition after placing third runner-up in the talent search program Star Circle Kid Quest (2009). Her breakthrough came with the dual role of identical twins in the fantasy drama Agua Bendita (2010); its success led to subsequent roles in Momay, her first leading role on television, and her feature film debut Ang Tanging Ina Mo: Last Na 'To!. The latter earned her the Star Award and Metro Manila Film Festival for Best Child Performer.

Manabat's profile increased following her performance in 100 Days to Heaven (2011), for which she was awarded the Box Office Entertainment Award for Most Popular Female Child Performer. For her role in the independently produced film A Mother's Story (2011), she won the FAMAS and Star Award for Best Child Actress. The following year, Manabat starred in month-long specials of the fantasy anthology Wansapanataym and played a mysterious spirit in the psychological horror film Amorosa where she received a FAMAS Award nomination. In 2015, she portrayed a girl diagnosed with progeria in the drama anthology Maalaala Mo Kaya, winning the Gawad Tanglaw for Best Single Performance by an Actress.

Following her brief appearance in the revenge drama Wildflower (2017), Manabat took a six-year break from acting. She returned in 2023 through the mystery drama series Dirty Linen and Senior High.

== Film ==
Key
†	Denotes shows that have not yet been released

Xyriel Manabat's film credits with year of release, film titles and roles
Year	Title	Role	Ref(s)
2010	Ang Tanging Ina Mo (Last na 'To!)	Monay Montecillo	
2011	Pak! Pak! My Dr. Kwak!	Maycey Arcangel	
2011	Enteng Ng Ina Mo	Monay Montecillo	
2012	A Mother's Story	Queenie Santos	
2012	Amorosa: The Revenge	Nadia	
2012	24/7 in Love	Ayie Manrique	
2012	Sisterakas	Cindy Maningas	
2013	Girl, Boy, Bakla, Tomboy	Cindy	
2015	Pangil sa Tubig	Fatima	
2017	Ilawod	Bea	
2024	Sunshine	Thea	
2025	Kontrabida Academy	Mimi	
2025	The Last Beergin	Sandy	
2025	Near Death	Mia	
2025	Sana Sinabi Mo	Michelle	
2025	Love You So Bad	Belai	
2026	18th Rose	Rose	
2026	Stuck on You	Sheryl Bunga	
TBA	Guryon †	TBA	

== Television ==
Key
†	Denotes shows that have not yet been aired

Xyriel Manabat's television credits with year of release, title(s) and role
Year	Title	Role	Notes	Ref(s)
2009	Star Circle Quest	Contestant		
2009	May Bukas Pa	Bea Aragon		
2009	I Love Betty La Fea	Young Marcela		
2009	Dahil May Isang Ikaw	Nini (Note: credited as Xyril Manabat)		
2009	Maalaala Mo Kaya	Alecks	Episode: "Bisikleta"	
2010	Agua Bendita	Young Agua and Bendita		
2010	Rubi	Young Rubi Perez / Theresa Dela Fuente		
2010	Momay	Miley "Momay" Buenavidez		
2010	Gimik 2010	Gracie Lorenzo		
2010	Your Song (Season 12)	Emily	Episode: "Andi"	
2010	Noah	Veronica "Nica" Avila		
2011	100 Days to Heaven	Young Anna Manalastas		
2011	Ikaw ay Pag-ibig	Angelica		
2012	Wansapanataym	Maan Antukin	Episode: "Maan Antukin"	
2012	Wansapanataym	Sandy	Episode: "Sandy and the Super Sandok"	
2012	Wansapanataym	Pam	Episode: "Pam Pabaya at ang Mahiwagang Gold Fish"	
2012	Wansapanataym	Grace	Episode: "Dollhouse"	
2012	Wansapanataym	Maya	Episode: "Hungry Birds"	
2012	Wansapanataym	Lara	Episode: "Lara Laro"	
2012	Wansapanataym	Joy	Episode: "Remote Emote"	
2012	Wansapanataym	Mai mai	Episode: "Mai Palusot"	
2012	Wansapanataym	Kate	Episode: "Ik-ik: The Madyik Biik"	
2012	Wansapanataym	Sarah	Episode: "Ballpen de Sarah Pen"	
2012	Wansapanataym	Bechay	Episode: "Magic Shoes"	
2012	Wansapanataym	Beauty	Episode: "Beauty is the Beast"	
2012	Wansapanataym	Laila	Episode: "Lai, Lai, Batang Pasaway!"	
2012	Wansapanataym	Pinay	Episode: "Pinay Big Sister"	
2012	Wansapanataym	Terry	Episode: "The Revengers"	
2012	Wansapanataym	Rose	Episode: "The Fairy Garden"	
2012	Wansapanataym	Lisa	Episode: "Ang Suyod ni Ang Suh-yod"	
2012	Wansapanataym	Lucy	Episode: "Kuha Mo?"	
2012	Wansapanataym	Tina	Episode: "KuryenTina"	
2012	Wansapanataym	Em-em	Episode: "Kids vs Zombies"	
2012	Wansapanataym	Mitos	Episode: "Mitos Touch"	
2012	Wansapanataym	Maya	Episode: "Yaya Yaya Puto Maya"	
2012	Wansapanataym	Katy	Episode: "Eat, Play, Love"	
2012	Wansapanataym	Tanya	Episode: "Hear na U, Sori na Me"	
2012	Wansapanataym	Barbie	Episode: "Plastik Pantastik"	
2012	Wansapanataym	Gellie	Episode: "The Amazing Gelliescope""	
2012	Wansapanataym	Audrey	Episode: "Bye bye Bangungot"	
2012	Wansapanataym	Jing-jing	Episode: "Jing-jing and the Giant"	
2012	Wansapanataym	Trexie	Episode: "Trick and Trixie"	
2013	Wansapanataym	Aya	Episode: "Petrang Paminta"	
2013	Wansapanataym	Era	Episode: "The Christmas Tablet"	
2013	Kailangan Ko'y Ikaw	Cherish Dagohoy		
2013	Juan dela Cruz	Tata		
2013	Maalaala Mo Kaya	Jillian	Episode: "Tsinelas"	
2013	Maalaala Mo Kaya	Young Pinky	Episode: "Walis"	
2013	Maalaala Mo Kaya	Young Judith	Episode: "Family Picture"	
2014	The Legal Wife	Young Monica "Ikay" Santiago		
2014	Ikaw Lamang	Young Monalisa "Mona" Roque		
2014	Hawak Kamay	Sandara Dara Nicholas / Sandara "Dara" Magpantay Agustin		
2014	Maalaala Mo Kaya	Rochelle	Episode: "Salamin"	
2015	Nathaniel	Camille		
2016	Maalaala Mo Kaya	Rowena	Episode: "Kweba"	
2016	Maalaala Mo Kaya	Cheska	Episode: "Droga"	
2017	Wildflower	Young Lily / Young Ivy Aguas		
2023	Dirty Linen	Antonette "Tonet" Feiro Pavia		
2023	Senior High	Roxanne "Roxy" Cristobal		
2024	High Street	Roxanne "Roxy" Cristobal		
2025	Pinoy Big Brother: Celebrity Collab Edition	Housemate		
2025	Wish Ko Lang!	Jamaica Seraspe	Episode: "Rabies"	
2025	It's Okay to Not Be Okay	Madeth		
2026	The Secrets of Hotel 88	Chesca Endaya		
2026	Miss Behave	Nyx Rodriguez		
2026	True Manila Encounters †		Episode: “Undressed”	

== Theatre ==
Year	Title	Role	Venue	Notes	Ref(s).
2027	Sunshine: The Immersive Stage Adaptation	Thea			

== Music videos ==
Year	Title	Artist	Ref.
2024	"Minahalagad"	Hev Abi	
2025	"Patient"	Sofronio Vasquez	
2026	"Malayo"	Mrld	
2026	"Una"	Silent Sanctuary	
