= Amorosa =

Amorosa may refer to:

- Amorosa (1986 film), a 1986 Swedish film
- Amorosa (2012 film), a 2012 Filipino psychological horror drama film
