= Xyriel Manabat =

Filipino actress (born 2004)

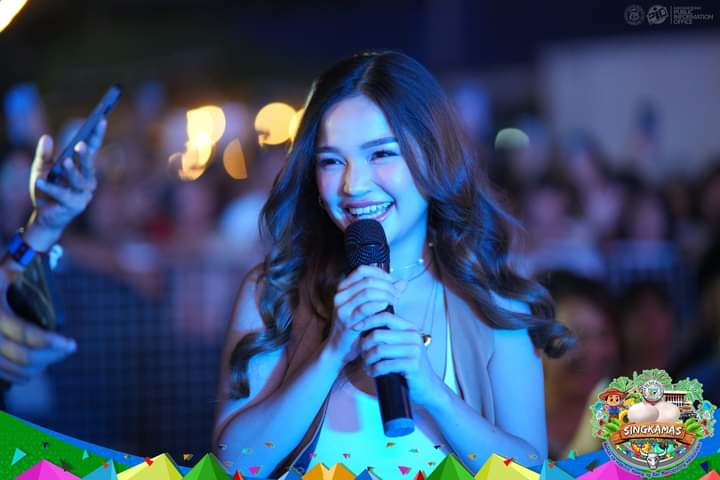
- Manabat at the Singkamas Festival in San Marcelino, Zambales in 2024
- Born: Xyriel Anne Bustamante Manabat; January 27, 2004 (age 22); Taytay, Rizal, Philippines
- Education: Golden Faith Academy
- Occupation: Actress
- Years active: 2009–2017; 2023–present
- Agent: Star Magic
- Works: Full list

Xyriel Anne Bustamante Manabat (Tagalog: [ˈsaɪɾɪl mɐˈnabɐt]; born January 27, 2004) is a Filipino actress. She began her acting career as a child actress after finishing third runner-up in the talent search program Star Circle Kid Quest: Search for the Kiddie Idol. She rose to fame for her performances as young version of the titular roles in Agua Bendita and 100 Days to Heaven. She then became the leading child actress from early to mid 2010s and has received numerous accolades including two FAMAS Awards, two PMPC Star Awards for Movies, two Gawad Tanglaw, a Box Office Entertainment Award and a Metro Manila Film Festival Award.

== Early life and background ==
Xyriel Anne Bustamante Manabat was born on January 27, 2004, in Taytay, Rizal, to Daryl Jake Manabat and Elizabeth Dianne M. Manabat. She has a younger brother. Manabat is known to have asthma.

In June 2020, Manabat graduated high school at the Golden Faith Academy with honors.

== Career ==
=== 2009–2013: Breakthrough ===
Manabat began acting in 2009 after joining Star Circle Quest: Search for the Next Kiddie Idol, finishing third runner-up in the talent competition. After playing minor roles in several shows, her breakthrough role came in 2010 when she was cast as young Agua and Bendita in Agua Bendita. According to Kantar Media, the pilot episode of the series received a national TV rating of 37.7%. Originally intended to play the characters for a week, the reception from the public ultimately forced the management to extend her portrayal for two more weeks. In February 2010, she made a short appearance in the romantic drama series Rubi as the young version of Angelica Panganiban's titular character. In May 2010, Manabat starred in the titular role Momay. The series was a success, debuting with a TV rating of 22.7% nationwide, ahead of its timeslot rival First Time with only 12.5%. In July 2010, she appeared in a supporting in the fantasy drama series Noah. The series premiered with strong viewership, garnering a national TV rating of 39.9% according to Kantar Media. In December 2010, she was cast in a supporting role in the dramedy film Ang Tanging Ina Mo (Last na 'To!). It was a box-office success and earned Manabat two acting awards including Best Child Actress at the 59th FAMAS Awards and Best Child Performer at the 36th Metro Manila Film Festival.

In April 2011, Manabat appeared in a supporting role in the dramedy film Pak! Pak! My Dr. Kwak! as Bea Alonzo's younger sister Maisie. In May 2011, she starred with Coney Reyes in the Christian drama series 100 Days to Heaven. The series was met with an astounding success, becoming the second most watched TV program of 2011 in the Philippines with an average rating of 32.6%. For her performance, she won Best Child Performer at the 26th PMPC Star Awards for Television, Most Popular Female Child Performer at the Box Office Entertainment Awards, Best Performance by an Actress at the Gawad Tanglaw Awards, Best Actress in a Daily Local Soap Opera at the USTv Student's Choice Awards and Child Star of the Year at the Yahoo! OMG! Awards. In November 2011, Manabat starred alongside Zaijian Jaranilla, Mutya Orquia and Louise Abuel in the family fantasy drama Ikaw Ay Pag-ibig. Upon its premiere, the series became the most watched TV program in the Philippines, garnering a national TV rating of 32% for its pilot episode.

In December 2011, Manabat reprised her role as Monay Montecillio in the crossover sequel Enteng ng Ina Mo. The film was a success at the box-office, becoming the highest grossing entry at the 37th Metro Manila Film Festival. In January 2012, Manabat starred alongside Pokwang and Rayver Cruz in the family independent film A Mother's Story. The film earned nearly ₱25 million at the box-office within its first two weeks. Lauded by critics for her performance, Manabat scored her second FAMAS Award for Best Child Actress. In July 2012, Manabat starred in an episode of the fantasy anthology Wansapanataym titled "Pinay Big Sister". According to Kantar Media, it was the second most watched TV program of the weekend in the Philippines with 34.8% national rating, winning the over its timeslot rival Manny Many Prizes with only 12.2%. In August 2012, her first horror film Amorosa was released in cinemas. Despite being screened in only 50 cinemas, the film earned nearly ₱12 million at the box-office within its first five days, outpacing the musical film I Do Bidoo Bidoo. Acclaimed by critics for her portrayal as Nadia, the film helped her score her third nomination for FAMAS Award for Best Child Actress. In January 2013, Manabat appeared in a supporting role in the drama series Kailangan Ko'y Ikaw. For her performance, she earned a nomination at the 27th PMPC Star Awards for Television as Best Child Performer.

=== 2014–2022: Further film and television appearances, Hiatus ===
In January 2014, Manabat made a special appearance in the drama series The Legal Wife as the young version of Monica Santiago, later portrayed by Angel Locsin. In March 2014, she played young version of Julia Montes's character Mona Roque in the period drama Ikaw Lamang. In December 2014, she played the role of Rochelle in an episode of Maalaala Mo Kaya. Her portrayal was acclaimed by critics, winning Best Single Performance by an Actress at the Gawad Tanglaw Awards. In 2015, she starred in the action drama film Pangil sa Tubig alongside Derek Ramsay, Yam Conception and Zaijan Jaranilla. Manabat has also starred in a number of episodes in the drama anthology Maalaala Mo Kaya. Following her short appearance in the series Wildflower, Manabat went on a hiatus to focus on her personal life and education. In May 2020, she graduated high school at the Golden Faith Academy in Taytay, Rizal and made an appearance as guest in the morning talk show Magandang Buhay.

=== 2023–present: Return to acting ===
Manabat returned to acting in January 2023 through the revenge drama Dirty Linen. She attended the first Star Magical Prom and ABS-CBN Ball the following months and appeared in the coming-of-age drama Senior High later that year. Candy magazine named her among the most stylish while Nylon Manila included her on their list of the breakthrough performances of the year, with writer Rafael Bautista calling her "one of the best actresses of her generation." Manabat reprised her role the following year in the television sequel High Street and appeared with co-star Zaijan Jaranilla at the Star Magical Prom where she was listed among the best dressed celebrities by Cosmopolitan and Nylon Manila.

Manabat was cast as Thea, close friend of Maris Racal's character in the sports drama Sunshine. The film first premiered at the 49th Toronto International Film Festival, and was theatrically released in the Philippines on July 23, 2025. The same year, she joined the cast of the eighteenth season of Pinoy Big Brother: Celebrity Collab Edition. Following her eviction nearly two months later, she starred in an episode of the drama anthology Wish Ko Lang!. In July 2025, she was cast in a supporting role as Madeth, the secretary of Anne Curtis' character in the adaptation of the Korean drama It's Okay to Not Be Okay. In September 2025, Manabat portrayed Mimi, Mauricia's daughter, in the fantasy comedy Kontrabida Academy which premiered on Netflix and was part of the ensemble cast as Sandy in the drama comedy The Last Beergin, which opened to 54 cinemas nationwide the following month. Later in 2025, Manabat appeared in the romantic drama Love You So Bad which competed at the 51st Metro Manila Film Festival.

In January 2026, Manabat starred as Mrld's love interest in the music video for the track "Malayo" (lit. 'Far'), which depicts the two as pickleball athletes. She next appeared as Chesca Endaya in the mystery drama The Secrets of Hotel 88. On February 2026, Manabat was announced to star in her first leading role in a feature film, opposite Kyle Echarri, in the romantic drama 18th Rose. The film exclusively premiered on Netflix and was a commercial success, debuting at number seven on Netflix's Global Top 10 Non-English Movies chart with 1.7 million viewership. Manabat was then cast as Nyx in the youth oriented Miss Behave, an iWantTFC original series, and starred in the romantic comedy Stuck on You opposite River Joseph, an official entry to the 2026 Puregold Cinepanalo Film Festival.

== Other activities ==
Manabat has participated in a number of charity events. In 2011, the production of 100 Days to Heaven had an offshoot charity activity— a gift-giving project titled "100 Toys to Heaven." In November 2012, she also took part in The Grand International Importers and Exporters Christmas Bazaar event which "aims to help underprivileged children".

In June 2010, Manabat took part in former Philippine President Benigno Aquino III's victory concert party as one of the events guest performers. In 2011, Manabat recorded her first single "Kuha Mo?" which was used as one of the theme songs of the Christian drama 100 Days to Heaven.

Manabat also appeared in TV commercials and has already endorsed Jollibee, Converse, Aficionado, Nestlé Bear Brand, Argentina Hotdog, Tang, Moose Gear and Robinson Supermarket.

== Reception ==
Manila Standard have named Manabat as "one of the most accomplished actresses on Philippine television." Media critic Nestor Torre Jr. have named her "one of the busiest and most popular child stars" while Yes! magazine included her on a list of 100 Most Beautiful Stars in 2011. Manabat was Google's second most searched female Filipino personality of 2022.

Commenting on Manabat's performance in Ang Tanging Ina Mo: Last na 'To!, Fidel Antonio Medel described her as "the most charming performer", highlighting her "angelic face and undeniable charisma, she shifts effortlessly from comedy to drama—allowing her to win the Best Child Performer award this year." For her role in Senior High, Nica Glorioso of Nylon Manila noted her "ability to portray a mix of complex emotions". Contributing for Inquirer.net, Hannah Malorca emphasize her ability to stand out in any role given, "shifting from comedy to drama in a snap." Malorca also added, "The way her expressions spoke for her character’s emotions themselves to the way she delivered her lines proved that only certain actors have the innate skill, and she’s one of them."

Reviewing her performance in Ikaw Lamang, Philippine Entertainment Portal contributor Jocelyn Dimaculangan wrote that Manabat "brought the house down with her funny one-liners and she evoked sympathy whenever she broke down in tears. For her portrayal of a patient with progeria in an episode of Maalaala Mo Kaya, Nestor Torre Jr. described her performance as "exceptionally insightful", stating that Manabat "went on to comprehensively understand the many complex emotions her tragedy-scarred character was feeling". Coney Reyes, whom she worked with in 100 Days to Heaven, praised her ability to quickly pick up complex instructions on set while Vilma Santos described her as a "good, good child actress."

== Personal life ==
Manabat is a member of Iglesia ni Cristo.

== Acting credits ==
Manabat's most commercially successful films include Ang Tanging Ina Mo: Last Na 'To! (2010), Enteng Ng Ina Mo (2011), 24/7 in Love, Sisterakas (both in 2012), and 18th Rose (2026). Her best regarded roles on television include Agua Bendita, Momay (both in 2010), 100 Days to Heaven (2011), Hawak Kamay (2014), Dirty Linen, Senior High (both in 2023), and It's Okay to Not Be Okay (2025).

== Accolades ==
Awards and nominations received by Xyriel Manabat
Award (Note: Awards, festivals, honors and other miscellaneous organizations are listed in alphabetical order.)	Year (Note: Indicates the year of ceremony. Each year is linked to the article about the awards held that year, wherever possible.)	Category	Nominated work	Result	Ref.
ASAP Pop Viewers' Choice Awards	2011	Pop Kapamilya TV Character	100 Days to Heaven	Nominated	
Box Office Entertainment Awards	2012	Most Popular Female Child Performer	100 Days to Heaven	Won	
CinePanalo Film Festival	2026	Best Actress	Stuck on You	Won	
FAMAS Awards	2011	Best Child Actress	Ang Tanging Ina Mo (Last na 'To!)	Won	
FAMAS Awards	2012	Best Child Actress	A Mother's Story	Won	
FAMAS Awards	2013	Best Child Actress	Amorosa: The Revenge	Nominated	
Gawad Genio Awards	2011	Best Film Child Performer	Ang Tanging Ina Mo (Last na 'To!)	Won	
Gawad PASADO Awards	2012	Pinakapasadong Simbolo ng Kagandahang Asal	100 Days to Heaven	Won	
Gawad PASADO Awards	2026	Best Supporting Actress	Kontrabida Academy	Nominated	
Gawad Tanglaw Awards	2012	Best Performance by an Actress (Drama Series)	100 Days to Heaven	Won	
Gawad Tanglaw Awards	2015	Best Single Performance by an Actress	Maalaala Mo Kaya ("Salamin")	Won	
Golden Screen TV Awards	2011	Outstanding Performance by an Actress in a Drama Series	100 Days to Heaven	Nominated	
Golden Screen TV Awards	2013	Outstanding Performance by an Actress in a Drama Series	100 Days to Heaven	Nominated	
Jeepney TV Fan Favorite Awards	2022	Fave Child Star	Xyriel Manabat	Nominated	
Jeepney TV Fan Favorite Awards	2022	Fave Twin / Triplets	Agua Bendita	Nominated	
Metro Manila Film Festival	2010	Best Child Performer	Ang Tanging Ina Mo (Last na 'To!)	Won	
Metro Manila Film Festival	2011	Best Child Performer	Enteng Ng Ina Mo	Nominated	
NSSU Students' Choice Awards for Radio and Television	2012	Special Award	Xyriel Manabat	Won	
PEPsters' Choice Awards	2013	Female Child Star of the Year	Xyriel Manabat	Won	
Pinoy Rebyu Awards	2026	Best Ensemble Performance	The Last Beergin	Nominated	
Platinum Stallion Media Awards	2025	Breakthrough Artist of the Year	High Street	Won	
PMPC Star Awards for Movies	2011	Movie Child Performer of the Year	Ang Tanging Ina Mo (Last na 'To!)	Won	
PMPC Star Awards for Movies	2012	Movie Child Performer of the Year	Pak! Pak! My Dr. Kwak!	Nominated	
PMPC Star Awards for Movies	2013	Movie Child Performer of the Year	A Mother's Story	Won	
PMPC Star Awards for Television	2010	Best New Female TV Personality	Agua Bendita	Nominated	
PMPC Star Awards for Television	2012	Best Drama Actress	100 Days to Heaven	Nominated	
PMPC Star Awards for Television	2012	Best Child Performer	100 Days to Heaven	Won	
PMPC Star Awards for Television	2013	Best Child Performer	Kailangan Ko'y Ikaw	Nominated	
PMPC Star Awards for Television	2015	Best Child Performer	Hawak Kamay	Nominated	
Rawr Awards	2023	Beshie ng Taon	Senior High	Nominated	
Rawr Awards	2026	Beshie ng Taon	Love You So Bad	Won	
Star Circle Quest: Search for the Next Kiddie Idol	2009	3rd Runner-up	Xyriel Manabat	Bronze	
Tag Awards Chicago	2023	Most Promising Female Star	Senior High	Won	
USTv Student's Choice Awards	2012	Best Actress in a Local Soap Opera	100 Days to Heaven	Won	
VP Choice Awards	2024	Breakthrough Star of the Year	Dirty Linen	Nominated	
VP Choice Awards	2024	TV Supporting Actress of the Year	Senior High	Nominated	
VP Choice Awards	2025	TV Supporting Actress of the Year	High Street	Nominated	
VP Choice Awards	2026	TV Supporting Actress of the Year	It's Okay to Not Be Okay	Nominated	
Yahoo OMG! Awards	2012	Child Star of the Year	Xyriel Manabat	Won	

== See also ==
- List of Filipino actresses
- Cinema of the Philippines
- Television in the Philippines
