= List of Dirty Linen episodes =

Dirty Linen is a Philippine drama television series aired by Kapamilya Channel. It aired on the network's Primetime Bida evening block, A2Z's A2Z Primetime, Jeepney TV and TV5's TodoMax Primetime Singko and worldwide via The Filipino Channel from January 23 to August 25, 2023, replacing the reruns of Flower of Evil.

== Series overview ==
Season	Episodes	Originally released	
Season	Episodes	First released	Last released
1	73	January 23, 2023	May 5, 2023
2	80	May 8, 2023	August 25, 2023

== Episodes ==
=== Season 1 (2023) ===
No. overall	No. in season	Title	TV title	Original release date	AGB Nielsen Ratings NUTAM People
1	1	"Four Underground"	"Missing 4"	January 23, 2023	3.6%
The powerful and influential Fiero clan celebrates the 15th anniversary of their cockpit arena built on the remains of a tragic and bloody past. A girl stops at nothing until she unravels the mystery behind her mother's disappearance.
2	2	"Belly of the Beast"	"New Maid"	January 24, 2023	4.8%
After being embroiled in an accident with Aidan, Mila, a newcomer in town, secures an opportunity to work for the Fieros. Unknown to the influential family, their new maid seeks to settle old scores with them.
3	3	"Looking for Trouble"	"Plano"	January 25, 2023	3.7%
Aidan gets into trouble for defending Chiara from an enraged men at the bar. While Mila keeps her eyes and ears open to dig up the Fieros' dirty linens, Abe witnesses Carlos' ruthlessness over a betrayal.
4	4	"The Weakest Link"	"Red Room"	January 26, 2023	3.8%
Mila tries to comfort Chiara after Leona brushes the young lady's achievement aside. Setting her sights on the Fiero clan's weakest link, the vindictive maid uncovers Ador's dirty little secret. A terrifying memory haunts Aidan.
5	5	"Exposed"	"Video"	January 27, 2023	4.2%
While Carlos and Doňa Cielo question the Pavias' lavish lifestyle, an oblivious Stella informs Ador about her latest recruit. A painful discovery concerning Rizza fuels Mila and Abe's resolve to bring the Fieros down.
6	6	"Regrets"	"Regrets"	January 30, 2023	3.2%
Abe, still consumed by his sickening discovery, looks back on how his past actions resulted in his wife's tragic fate. Carlos learns of Ador's dirty secret through an anonymous tip.
7	7	"Family of the Year"	"Sabotage"	January 31, 2023	4.2%
Receiving a prestigious award, the Fieros put up a united front. However, a disgusting video drags the family through the mire during their glorious night, much to Mila's delight.
8	8	"Banished"	"Damage Control"	February 1, 2023	4.4%
While Mila and Lala keep Stella safe from the Fieros' fury, Ador suffers severe consequences for his scandalous actions. The influential clan scrambles to their feet to save their reputation.
9	9	"Muddy the Waters"	"Cleaners"	February 2, 2023	4.4%
After confronting her husband about his lies, Feliz defies her own family as she insists on taking Ador back into the mansion. Aidan cleans up Ador's mess, much to Mila's dismay. Meanwhile, Stella plans to strike while the iron is hot.
10	10	"Out of Sight, Out of Mind"	"Out of Sight"	February 3, 2023	4.4%
Chiara and her cousins head out of town to avoid trouble. With nothing else to use against the Fieros, Mila and her team set their sights on their next target. Unbeknownst to them, Stella reaches out to Ador.
11	11	"Control"	"Mistake"	February 6, 2023	4.0%
Mila blames herself to failing to rescue Stella. With Ador as the prime suspect, the Fieros start devising a countermeasure as inspector Onore begins investigating Stella's death. Chiara and Nico cross paths again.
12	12	"Who's That Girl?"	"Blame"	February 7, 2023	3.5%
Abe alerts Mila as the Fieros and the police go after the mysterious woman caught on CCTV the night Stella died. Later, an oblivious Ador warns the vindictive maid against ratting him out.
13	13	"Diversion"	"Diversion"	February 8, 2023	3.5%
While the Fieros come up with a plan to clear their tarnished reputation, Max discovers Feliz's expensive diversion from her problems. Atty. Olga stumbles upon a piece of favorable information about Stella.
14	14	"Outing"	"Fallguy"	February 9, 2023	4.2%
Chief Isidro presents the culprit behind Stella's death to the media, but Lemuel senses something amiss about the case. Chiara, her cousins, and their friends set out for a quick escapade. Meanwhile, Mila sees a different side of Aidan.
15	15	"Adventure"	"Search"	February 10, 2023	3.5%
In an attempt to make it up to Feliz, Ador offers financial help for her gambling debts. Mila and Aidan search together for the missing rooster, while Nico gets a chance to make a good impression on Chiara.
16	16	"Rescue"	"Rescue"	February 13, 2023	2.9%
Nico and Chiara brim with joy when they finally get rescued from the island. Feliz tries to hide her gargantuan gambling debt from her family, only to get shaken to the core when Hector directly contacts Cielo.
17	17	"Double Cross"	"New Plan"	February 14, 2023	3.6%
Carlos agrees to help Feliz with her gambling debts despite his sister's unwillingness to follow his condition. Much to Mila's distress, the Fiero scion soon prepares an underhanded ploy against Hector.
18	18	"Money Trail"	"Mysterious"	February 15, 2023	4.1%
Problems continue to pile up on Carlos as he deals with Feliz's mess. Mila's closeness with Aidan piques the curiosity of her fellow housemaids. Lemuel refuses to let the mysterious woman slip through his fingers following the robbing incident.
19	19	"Closing In"	"Negotiation"	February 16, 2023	4.2%
The Fieros run scared as Chiara goes missing amid a looming threat, only for Tonet and Clint to find their cousin with Nico. While Leona negotiates with Hector, the oblivious Carlos tracks down the mysterious group that ruined his plan.
20	20	"Unexpected"	"Pass"	February 17, 2023	3.8%
Mila and her team find a way to outmaneuver Carlos' men in the nick of time. Just when the vindictive maid makes another attempt to win over her overbearing boss, a heated argument ensures between Carlos and Leona.
21	21	"Closer"	"True Identity"	February 20, 2023	3.6%
Wanting to become independent from her family. Feliz asks Cielo to give her the inheritance her late father left her. Mila remains undetected at the Fiero's mansion, unaware that a pair of probing eyes has set its sights on her.
22	22	"Next Target"	"Next Target"	February 21, 2023	3.2%
Carlos agrees to help Feliz and Ador as his sister remains determined to stand on her own feet. While Lemuel attempts to figure out Mila's link to Stella's case, the vengeful maid informs Abe about Leona's argument with Carlos.
23	23	"Distraction"	"Distraction"	February 22, 2023	4.1%
Leona swells with pride when her efforts begin to pay off until Carlos steals her thunder. Mila helps an intoxicated Aidan return to his room, unaware that Precious is carefully watching her every move.
24	24	"Make Lemonade out of Leaving"	"Gossip"	February 23, 2023	4.2%
As Mila becomes a target of malicious gossip in the mansion, Aidan and Carlos step in to clear her name and save her from Doña Cielo's fury. Unbeknownst to the Fieros, this gives the vindictive maid a new idea to reach her goals.
25	25	"Uncovered"	"Involvement"	February 24, 2023	4.2%
Ador confesses to Carlos and Leona his past involvement with Mila, prompting the Fieros to go after their suspicious maid. Later, Lemuel finds an opportunity to subtly interrogate Mila after saving her from a dangerous situation.
26	26	"Escape"	"Wrath"	February 27, 2023	4.6%
Shocked upon seeing her husband strangling Mila, Feliz reminds Ador and Carlos about the last time someone died within their household. Rolando, meanwhile, breaks out in a cold sweat as Alexa remains nowhere to be found.
27	27	"Panic"	"Finding Milla"	February 28, 2023	3.6%
Aidan learns about Mila's disappearance as the former maid desperately attempts to break free from the Fiero's clutches. Chiara heads back to San Fermin, only to catch sight of Nico and Tonet together.
28	28	"Unlikely Hero"	"Savior"	March 1, 2023	4.5%
Mila seizes the opportunity to convince Aidan of her innocence after the latter unexpectedly came to her rescue. The rivalry between Chiara and Tonet intensifies.
29	29	"Suspicion"	"Suspicion"	March 2, 2023	4.5%
After being reprimanded by Leona, Chiara vents her frustrations on Mila when the maid's sudden return to the Fiero household arouses suspicions involving Aidan. In the dead of the night, Carlos sees his wife sneaking out of the house.
30	30	"Exposed"	"Exposed"	March 3, 2023	4.2%
Mila keeps her guard up as the Fieros remain suspicious of her and keep tabs on her every move. Later, Leona basks in satisfaction after outsmarting Carlos' private investigator tailing her.
31	31	"Simmering"	"Fooling Around"	March 6, 2023	4.2%
Leona confronts Hector for compromising the exclusivity of her business, unaware that her husband is watching her from afar. Burning with jealousy, Carlos comes up with a way to get back at the gangster, putting Lala's mission in jeopardy.
32	32	"All Eyes"	"All Eyes"	March 7, 2023	4.3%
Abe thinks of a way to turn the tide in their favor as the Fiero household remains suspicious of Mila. Crossing paths with Nico at school, Chiara continues to give him the cold shoulder.
33	33	"The Lioness Den"	"Undercover"	March 8, 2023	3.7%
Aidan decides to be on his mother's tail upon seeing Leona leave their house. With the help of a reluctant Lala, Max goes undercover as Hector's fighter to infiltrate the Lioness Den.
34	34	"Ultimatum"	"Ultimatum"	March 9, 2023	4.3%
Leona finds herself between a rock and a hard place as Aidan struggles to accept her underground business. Meanwhile, Mila and her team brew another plan to wreak havoc upon the Fieros.
35	35	"Ready to Rumble"	"Collapse"	March 10, 2023	4.0%
While the Fieros are on pins and needles because of the closure of their largest business, an unconcerned Leona finds a reason to continue her secret dealings. Unknown to her, a nerve-racking scene awaits her in the Lioness Den.
36	36	"Dangerous"	"Out of Control"	March 13, 2023	4.2%
While Leona is trying to stop her son's match, an accident in the ring leaves Aidan in a state of shock. Carlos tortures Gary into revealing his wife's secret.
37	37	"Anticipation"	"Anticipation"	March 14, 2023	N/A
While Lemuel begins his investigation on the mysterious brawl victim, Aidan and Leona try to make their life appear normal. Alexa's team prepares to expose the latest Fiero scandal, only to be caught off guard by Nico's surprise.
38	38	"Gotcha"	"Punishment"	March 15, 2023	3.7%
Aidan refuses to throw Leona under the bus despite facing a serious criminal charge. A misunderstanding arises between Nico and Rolando when the latter rejects his son's scholarship offer.
39	39	"Cover the Tracks"	"Explanation"	March 16, 2023	4.2%
Leona and Olga try to cover up traces of the Lioness Den as Carlos and the police leave no stone unturned to uncover the whole truth. Rolando gets reminded of his past mistakes following a disagreement with Nico.
40	40	"Wrath"	"Rage"	March 17, 2023	4.0%
With Lala and Max's persuasion, Rolando finally allows Nico to attend his dream school. After squeezing the truth out of Vernon, Carlos files into a rage as he confronts Leona about her alleged lover and the Lioness Den.
41	41	"Getting Out"	"Frustration"	March 20, 2023	3.9%
Alexa reminds Rolando to be more careful now that Nico is in Alhambra. Despite getting out of prison, Aidan remains troubled as he gets hounded by memories of Olivia's death.
42	42	"Sense of Truth"	"Nightmares"	March 21, 2023	4.1%
With Leona on Doña Cielo's bad side, Feliz and Ador find an opportunity to be involved in the family business. Mila gets a whiff of truth about Olivia's disappearance when Aidan experiences another nightmare.
43	43	"Weight of Guilt"	"Confession"	March 22, 2023	3.9%
Mila arrives just in time to stop a sorrow-stricken Aidan from his attempt to end his misery, only to hear his vague confession. Feliz, meanwhile, steps up her game in hopes of impressing Doňa Cielo.
44	44	"Convincing"	"Convince"	March 23, 2023	3.9%
Despite her doubts, Leona instructs Mila to watch over Aidan upon realizing how much her son trusts the maid. Nico tries to adjust to his new school. Chief Isidro presents Lemuel with a convincing lead about Miguel's case.
45	45	"Right All Along"	"New Agenda"	March 24, 2023	3.9%
While Mila uses her new role to push for their hidden agenda, Abe preys on another member of the Fiero household. Lemuel inches closer to the truth as Miguel regains consciousness.
46	46	"Messed Up"	"The Ex is Back"	March 27, 2023	4.3%
The Fieros resort to intimidation to force Miguel into reneging his allegations against Aidan. Alexa remains confident that she will extract more information from Aidan, only to learn about the arrival of an important person from her target's past.
47	47	"Past versus Future"	"Bold Move"	March 28, 2023	4.1%
Abe boldly makes a move on Precious in order to learn more about the Fieros' secrets. Aidan bares his heart to Mila until his ex-girlfriend, Sophie, unexpectedly arrives.
48	48	"The Truth About The Ex"	"Truth About The Ex"	March 29, 2023	4.0%
Mila refuses to give up her chance to pursue her goal amid a seeming threat to her plans. Sophie tries to win Aidan back, but her uninterested ex-boyfriend struggles to get the vindictive maid off his mind.
49	49	"Hard to Get"	"Partnership"	March 30, 2023	4.1%
While the Fieros ensure the fulfillment of a promising business partnership, Olga convinces Leona to leave her toxic family. Lemuel grows curious about a familiar face. Mila continues to lure Aidan into the palm of her hand.
50	50	"It's Complicated"	"Complicated"	March 31, 2023	4.4%
Sophie spares no effort to get back together with Aidan, while Carlos and Leona use their ties with the Madrigates heiress to appease their anxious investors. Abe alerts his team as Lemuel gets a lead on Lala's identity.
51	51	"Truth and Lies"	"Truth and Lies"	April 3, 2023	5.1%
Lemuel is dead set in tracking down Lala, believing that the elusive woman has accomplices. Aidan continues to give Sophie the cold shoulder. Rolando learns of the rumors circulating in the mansion regarding Olivia's disappearance.
52	52	"Working Out"	"First Kiss"	April 4, 2023	4.0%
Sophie seethes with jealousy upon seeing Mila and Aidan share an intimate moment together. Despite Rolando's disapproval, Alexa thinks of the quickest way to exact their revenge against the Fieros.
53	53	"Wrong Turn"	"Companion"	April 5, 2023	4.4%
To keep Mila away from Aidan, Leona reassigns the vindictive maid as Chiara's companion at school, much to her daughter's chagrin. Lala is thrown into a panic upon receiving a call from an old acquaintance.
54	54	"Risky Steps"	"Take the Risk"	April 10, 2023	3.4%
Tension intensifies between Chiara and Tonet as the former insists on disinviting Nico from her house party. Aidan takes a risky step to pursue Mila. The maid, on the other hand, discloses her and Aidan's blossoming relationship to a colleague.
55	55	"Getting Nowhere"	"Surprise Encounter"	April 11, 2023	3.4%
Lala continues to cover her tracks with Max's help as Lemuel presses on with his investigation. While Chiara prepares for her upcoming pool party, Tonet secretly sabotages her cousin's plans.
56	56	"Worlds Collide"	"Pool Party"	April 12, 2023	4.0%
Mila and Abe are thrown into a panic when Nico unexpectedly arrives at the Fiero mansion as Chiara's sole guest at her pool party. An oblivious Nico, on the other hand, seizes the opportunity to become closer to his classmate.
57	57	"Jeopardy"	"Panic"	April 13, 2023	4.0%
Nico comes face-to-face with Carlos at the party and gets bombarded with intimidating questions, prompting Alexa to warn him about getting close to Chiara. Unaware of the vicious plot against them, the Fieros suffer an immense loss in their business.
58	58	"Cut Off"	"Fired"	April 14, 2023	N/A
The bad blood between the cousins deepens as an enraged Chiara confronts Tonet for sabotaging her party. Mila and Aidan carry on with their relationship, unaware that their secret is bound to be exposed sooner than expected.
59	59	"The Proposal"	"The Proposal"	April 17, 2023	N/A
Mila takes Abe's advice and agrees to be kicked out of the mansion. Unaware of Mila's departure, Aidan attends a lavish party with Sophie to unveil their family's partnership. To Aidan's utter shock, Sophie pops a very important question.
60	60	"Ruined"	"The Ruined"	April 18, 2023	N/A
Mila reaches out to Aidan upon learning that he has fallen into her trap, only to find herself in danger when the Fieros hunt her down. As his family scrambles to deal with their business setback, Aidan resolves to be with the former maid.
61	61	"Odds in Her Favor"	"Against All Odds"	April 19, 2023	N/A
Aidan heads out to meet Mila, unaware that Carlos is convincing Sophie to pursue their business plan. Lemuel turns to Lala's acquaintance as he prepares for an entrapment operation against her.
62	62	"Counter Attack"	"Counter Attack"	April 20, 2023	N/A
Lala pours her heart out as Max seethes with jealousy over Alexa's decision to stay with Aidan. Despite fighting back, Nico continues to face bullying from Clint and Chiara's friends. News alleging Sophie's infidelity spreads online.
63	63	"Raging Emotions"	"Burden"	April 21, 2023	N/A
As Sophie's scandal puts a strain on the Fieros and Madrigales' relationship, Leona reaches her boiling point when Doña Cielo pins the blame on her for all their family's troubles. Lala faces the consequences of her reckless actions.
64	64	"Cornered"	"Permission"	April 24, 2023	N/A
Unexpected help arrives when Lala gets cornered by Lemuel. Aidan informs Mila of the scandal that came out and asks for her permission to step forward and clear Sophie's name. Ador goes to the house where Mila's supposed sister is staying.
65	65	"Pointing Fingers"	"Bully"	April 25, 2023	N/A
Carlos and Feliz attempt to talk to the Madrigales in hopes of finally sealing their business deal. Nico ends up at the hospital following a violent altercation with Clint and his friends, only to be painted in a bad fight.
66	66	"Standing Ground"	"Reconcile"	April 26, 2023	N/A
Chiara comes to Nico's defense just as Rolando orders his son to stay away from the Fieros. Aidan stands his ground and continues to disobey Doña Cielo, unaware that Sophie decides to take matters into her own hands.
67	67	"Heartbreaking Truth"	"Heartbreaking Truth"	April 27, 2023	N/A
Mila tries to get information about Olivia when an oblivious Aidan opens up about his childhood. However, her heart shatters into pieces as she finally confirms the painful truth behind her mother's disappearance.
68	68	"Blurred Lines"	"Refuse"	April 28, 2023	N/A
Rolando and Max remind Alexa of their mission when the latter's growing feelings for Aidan begin to cloud her judgement. As Sophie's ploy manages to get Aidan's attention, the Fieros grow hell-bent on eliminating Mila.
69	69	"Pushing Back"	"Faithful"	May 1, 2023	N/A
Mila remains faithful to her revenge plans even after confirming the truth behind her mother's disappearance and falling for Aidan at once. However, Ador manages to track her. A new development in Lemuel's investigation shakes the Fieros to the core.
70	70	"Two-Faced"	"Interrogate"	May 2, 2023	N/A
Aidan makes a promise to Mila in a bid to stop her from leaving their safe house. After settling the score with Ador, Abe feigns concern for him to extract more information about the Fieros' four missing household workers.
71	71	"Entrapment"	"Trap"	May 3, 2023	N/A
Aidan brings Mila to Manila in the meantime while they plan for her escape to another country. Convinced that she is conniving with Mila for their downfall, Carlos and Ador set up a trap to capture Lala once and for all.
72	72	"Sacrifice"	"Sacrifice"	May 4, 2023	N/A
While Lala remains tight-lipped despite the torture Ador had put her through, Mila scrambles to her feet to save her captured ally. As problems pile up for the Fieros, Olga urges Leona to go with her and leave everything behind.
73	73	"Conditions"	"Conditions"	May 5, 2023	4.0%
Aidan formally introduces Mila to the Fieros as his girlfriend, hoping to patch things up with them. However, his family remains hostile to patch things up with them. However, his family remains hostile toward their former maid and forces him to make a tough choice.

=== Season 2 (2023) ===
No. overall	No. in season	Title	TV title	Original release date	AGB Nielsen Ratings NUTAM People
74	1	"Choices"	"Torture"	May 8, 2023	N/A
Despite finally admitting to herself that she had fallen for Aidan, Mila chooses to push through with her revenge on the Fieros. While Lala continues to endure torture, Ador gets away with murder once more by pinning Pule's death on someone else.
75	2	"Conflicted Hearts"	"Jealousy"	May 9, 2023	4.1%
As Leona and Carlos get into a heated fight over the latter's jealousy, Chiara blames Aidan for their family's growing problems. Mila and her team look for a way to cause a stir in the Fiero household and divert their enemies' attention from Lala.
76	3	"Out"	"The Affair"	May 10, 2023	4.0%
Olga tries to pacify Carlos as his suspicions about Leona get out of control, but to no avail. Mila and Max discover Leona's forbidden love affair and waste no time using the shocking information to their advantage.
77	4	"Friendship Over"	"Brutal"	May 11, 2023	4.5%
Aidan and Doña Cielo reach a compromise regarding Mila and their family business. Believing that Olga is covering up for Leona, a furious Carlos confronts his long-time friend until the brutal reality of their situation hits him.
78	5	"Depravity"	"Other Woman"	May 12, 2023	4.3%
Max finally finds Lala and tries to save her, but the Fieros' arrival leaves him with no choice but to bide his time and watch his battered ally repeatedly suffer at the enemies' hands. Leona goes back to the Fiero mansion despite Olga's pleas
79	6	"No Escape"	"Wanted"	May 15, 2023	3.4%
Max saves Lala, but the two get separated as the former fights Carlos, Ador, and their men. While Abe and Mila anxiously wait for the pair's return, Aidan finds his girlfriend missing in the middle of the night.
80	7	"We Will Survive"	"Survive"	May 16, 2023	N/A
While Lemuel's relentless investigation begins to pay off, Lala steels herself to continue seeking vengeance against the ruthless Fieros. Sensing something amiss after Carlos return home, Leona anxiously looks for Olga.
81	8	"Breather"	"Grave"	May 17, 2023	N/A
Learning of what Carlos did to her lover, Leona urges Olga to hide for the time being. Unaware of Lemuel's developing pursuit, Alexa and her team take a breather from their mission. Meanwhile, the Madrigaleses brew a sinister plot.
82	9	"Nightmare"	"Forbidden"	May 18, 2023	N/A
Alexa and her team do their utmost to keep the oblivious Nico out of harm's way as he grows closer to Chiara. While the Fieros' troubles get cleared up, a terrifying nightmare haunts Mila after Aidan affirms his love for her.
83	10	"Fall Out"	"Fall Out"	May 19, 2023	4.4%
Tension rises at the Fieros' party after Mila accepts Aidan's marriage proposal in front of everyone, leaving Sophie heartbroken and disgraced. Max and Lala face danger as they search for their loved ones' graves.
84	11	"Kudos"	"Intruder"	May 22, 2023	4.2%
Aidan beams with joy as Mila accepts his marriage proposal. Lemuel's small celebration with his loved ones is cut short by a report of an intruder. However, nothing can be more disruptive than the shocking news that reaches Doña Cielo.
85	12	"Through the Fire"	"Breakdown"	May 23, 2023	5.0%
Following Doña Cielo threats, Leona hatches a plan to get what she thinks she deserves from their family. While Carlos falls apart at the seams and lands in a tragic situation, a disguised Mila encounters Lemuel at the Fieros' cockpit.
86	13	"Grief"	"Grief"	May 24, 2023	4.1%
Grief plagues the Fiero household when the news of Carlos' unfortunate demise reaches them. Unknown to Alexa and her team, Lemuel pins the incident on them following his scuffle with an unidentified woman.
87	14	"Implications"	"Accusations"	May 25, 2023	4.3%
While the family mourns Carlos' death, Doña Cielo brings Leona's affair into the open and accuses her daughter-in-law of killing her son. Max takes action in an effort to thwart the police investigation against him.
88	15	"Mourning"	"Goodbye"	May 26, 2023	4.4%
Leona tries to clear the air with Aidan about her affair and defends her lover from his malicious accusations. While the people of El Hambra join the Fieros in mourning Carlos' death, a resentful ally puts on a sympathetic mask.
89	16	"Loss"	"Loss"	May 29, 2023	4.9%
As the Fieros lay Carlos' remains to rest, an emotional Aidan vows to avenge his father's death. Emotions run even higher when not just one, but two unwanted guests show up uninvited at Carlos' funeral.
90	17	"Broken Pieces"	"Broken Pieces"	May 30, 2023	4.3%
Trying to pick up the broken pieces left by Carlos' demise, Leona reiterates her and Olga's innocence, but Aidan remains doubtful of his mother's words. Lemuel obtains more clues that may lead him to Max.
91	18	"The Culprit"	"Culprit"	May 31, 2023	4.3%
Nico's efforts to comfort Chiara draw spiteful reactions from the Fieros, forcing the grieving teen to demand an impossible request from Mila. Later, Alexa is taken aback by Lala's shocking confession.
92	19	"One Down"	"Captured"	June 1, 2023	4.5%
Lala's plan backfires, putting Max and their team in a tight spot. While the guilty Fieros tremble as ghosts from their past return to haunt them, a determined Aidan sets out to uncover the truth behind his family's spiral of problems.
93	20	"Wreckage"	"Devastation"	June 2, 2023	4.7%
While Aidan struggles to come to terms with the skeletons in his family's closet, Alexa remains torn between her growing feelings for him and her team's mission. Chiara seeks solace from Nico after getting wind of Leona's affair with Olga.
94	21	"Developments"	"Developments"	June 5, 2023	4.7%
Chiara receives a harsh scolding from Doña Cielo for staying the night at Nico's place. Alexa obtains a shocking and crucial piece of information against the Fieros after Aidan's expansion plans alarmed his guilty family members.
95	22	"Body Cavity"	"Clash"	June 6, 2023	4.8%
While Lemuel investigates the alleged corpses found at their cockpit arena, the sinful Fieros attempt to dispose of their dirty linens. Alexa toughens up her crestfallen team members and thinks of a plan to find their loved ones' remains.
96	23	"Espionage"	"Date"	June 7, 2023	4.5%
Abe retains his job and gets assigned by Doña Cielo to be Chiara's driver. To avoid having his cover blown, he fails to stop Chiara from escaping to go on a date with Nico. Feliz and Ador are eaten up with guilt as their long-buried crimes resurface.
97	24	"Consequences"	"Upset"	June 8, 2023	4.1%
Chiara continues her acts of rebellion against her family, jeopardizing Nico's scholarship and Abe's job. Mila finds a chance to probe for information when Aidan suffers from another haunting nightmare. Ador falls prey to a surprise attack.
98	25	"Smear Campaign"	"Realizations"	June 9, 2023	4.5%
Rolando fumes upon learning of Nico's expulsion from school because of Chiara. In an effort to clear her father's name, Sophie drags Mila and the Fieros through the mud. Lemuel receives a troubling order regarding Carlos' case.
99	26	"Hitched"	"Hitched"	June 12, 2023	4.5%
Fed up with his family's relentless meddling with his relationship, Aidan finds a way to permanently keep Mila by his side. While Abe and Lala struggle to squeeze the truth out of Ador, Alexa gets wind of an enemy's another dirty move.
100	27	"Hacked"	"Hacked"	June 13, 2023	4.1%
Amid the opportunity to get his loved ones' remains, Rolando refuses to lay them to rest just yet in hopes of bringing their enemies to their downfall. Unaware of Aidan and Mila's union, the Fieros are thrown into a panic upon losing their wealth.
101	28	"Warning"	"Out For Revenge"	June 14, 2023	4.3%
Lemuel pursues an anonymous tip and discovers the possible remains of the Fieros' four missing houseworkers. While Aidan is forced to break the news of his new status to his family in an untimely manner, Ador is able to send them a warning.
102	29	"Uncovering Dirt"	"Uncovering Dirt"	June 15, 2023	4.1%
While Mila and Aidan bask in martial bliss, an upset Chiara makes up her mind to leave the mansion. Dread fills the Fieros when news about their long-kept filthy secret breaks out and sparks an investigation against them.
103	30	"Blood Don't Lie"	"DNA Test"	June 16, 2023	4.4%
Max cooperates with Lemuel and undergoes DNA testing in a bid to formally reopen the case of the Fieros' four missing houseworkers. Striking while the iron is hot, Lala decides to come forward but unwittingly puts herself at risk.
104	31	"Character Assassination"	"Fight Back"	June 19, 2023	4.0%
While the Fieros find a cunning way to counter Lala and Max's claims, Alexa vows to do whatever it takes to prove the wicked family's guilt. Chiara and Nico grow closer as they spend more time together, oblivious to all the chaos back home.
105	32	"Quid Pro Quo"	"Deal"	June 20, 2023	4.5%
Alexa and Rolando make plans on how to get Lala and Max out of jail and continue their investigation in La Muerte. Unbeknownst to them, Doña Cielo forces Ador to take the blame for the death of their three household staff.
106	33	"Mea Culpa"	"Fallback"	June 21, 2023	4.8%
Ador surrenders himself to the authorities, leaving Feliz devastated knowing that her family has a hand in it. Abe makes use of his return to the mansion to subtly interrogate Precious. Tension builds when Ador gets jailed together with Max.
107	34	"Ping Pong"	"DNA Result"	June 22, 2023	4.3%
The DNA test results finally reveal the brutal deaths of Noel, Lydi, and Rizza, bringing renewed pain to Alexa's team. Before their family gets further implicated, Leona finds a way to turn the tables through Ador's shocking revelation.
108	35	"Sacrificial Lamb"	"Victim"	June 23, 2023	4.0%
While Alexa asserts Olivia's innocence in the deaths of the Fieros' three other houseworkers, Pilar share pivotal information about the case with Alejandro. Feliz confronts Ador over his decision to take the fall for her family.
109	36	"Incriminating Proof"	"Clue"	June 26, 2023	4.7%
Abe inches closer to obtaining crucial information from Precious as her conscience starts to get the best of her. Alexa gets hold of incriminating evidence against Carlos and soon finds an important clue concerning her mother.
110	37	"Rue the Day"	"Hunch"	June 27, 2023	5.0%
Following her hunch, Mila figures out a way to secretly search for Olivia's remains in La Muerte. Nico learns that Rizza's body has been found, prompting Rolando and Alexa to confess everything to him.
111	38	"Elusive Justice"	"Framed"	June 28, 2023	3.9%
While Nico struggles to accept his family'a revelations, justice remains elusive for Max and Lala when the tables turn against them in favor of the Fieros. Refusing to back down, Alexa sets out to uncover the truth about her mother.
112	39	"Hidden"	"Hidden"	June 29, 2023	4.2%
Lala's attempt to escape from the police fails, while Abe sends Nico away from Chiara and the Fieros. In hopes of finding amswers, Mila makes up an excuse to be able to continue investigating the property in La Muerte.
113	40	"Resurrection Day"	"Resurrection"	June 30, 2023	4.5%
Olga and Leona's move to take over the company takes a toll on Doña Cielo's health, further staining Aidan's relationship with his mother. Alexa and Max search for clues in Alejandro's house, unaware of a bigger secret lying behind its closed doors.
114	41	"Backfired"	"Backfired"	July 3, 2023	4.2%
While Doña Cielo's condition worsens, Carlos, who faked his own death to avoid persecution, finally regains consciousness. Lemuel catches Mila and obtains his late brother's investigation records regarding the deaths of the four Fiero houseworkers.
115	42	"Crumbling Walls"	"Inheritance"	July 4, 2023	3.9%
Alexa, Rolando, and Max set their sights on getting Lala out of jail despite their skepticism toward Lemuel. The Fiero family feud intensifies as Aidan continues to stand his ground against Leona and Olga.
116	43	"Allies"	"Allies"	July 5, 2023	4.3%
While Chiara grows anxious over his sudden disappearance, Nico remains conflicted about getting in touch with his girlfriend. Alexa persuades Lemuel to cooperate with her. Sophie reveals a new trick up her sleeve to get hold of Aidan.
117	44	"He Lives"	"Comeback"	July 6, 2023	4.4%
Leona's hurtful words lead Chiara to question her own identity. Getting the shock of his life upon seeing a familiar face, Aidan finds himself caught in another dilemma when he receives a demanding request.
118	45	"Father Figure"	"Challenge"	July 7, 2023	4.4%
After learning of Alejandro's offer to Lala, Lemuel grow increasingly suspicious of his godfather and decides to probe the latter's house. While Alexa's affection for Aidan alarms Rolando, Carlos remains distrustful of his son's wife.
119	46	"Cloaked"	"Unseen"	July 10, 2023	4.7%
Aidan secretly brings Carlos home, leaving an oblivious Leona terrified when she somehow catches a glimpse of her dead husband. Tension builds between Lemuel and Alejandro. Alexa and Rolando's digging at La Muerte finally bears fruit.
120	47	"Resurrection"	"Alive"	July 11, 2023	3.8%
Doña Cielo returns home from the hospital. Sophie receives an enticing offer from Leona as she begins to reconsider her partnership with the Fieros. Alexa comes across something unexpected while trying to search for Carlos' belongings.
121	48	"Hide and Seek"	"Hide and Seek"	July 12, 2023	4.1%
After learning of Alexa's startling discovery at the Fiero mansion. Rolando finds a way to collect evidence of Carlos' lies, while Lemuel links the news to Alejandro's suspicious behavior. Sophie gets hold of a trump card against Mila.
122	49	"Return of the Undead"	"Misunderstanding"	July 13, 2023	4.5%
Sophie attempts to drive Aidan and Mila apart using the picture she took of her rival. While Carlos gets forced to come out of the shadows when news of his existence breaks out, a heated confrontation ensures between Lemuel and Alejandro.
123	50	"Repercussions"	"Repercussions"	July 14, 2023	4.4%
Secrets and lies strain Aidan and Mila's relationship. Upon his return, Carlos wastes no time dealing with his enemies and orders his accomplice to get the job done, putting Lala's life in grave danger.
124	51	"Change of Heart"	"Change of Heart"	July 17, 2023	4.4%
Lemuel saves Lala from Chief Isidro's underling and realizes that the man he looks up to is nothing but a paid henchman in uniform. Meanwhile, Carlos puts Leona in a very tight and painful spot when he shows him a live attempt to kill Olga.
125	52	"Crash and Burn"	"Crash and Burn"	July 18, 2023	5.0%
As Chiara's car accident leaves her seriously injured, Carlos makes up a story to appease his daughter over Leona's cold treatment of her and later tells off his wife. With Lemuel's help, Alexa's team discovers another devastating truth.
126	53	"Secret's Out"	"Defamation"	July 19, 2023	5.0%
Despite struggling to accept their shocking discovery, Lemuel resolves to join Alexa's team in their quest for the truth. Displeased with the Fieros' façade of a happy family, Olga decides to take matters into her own hands at the expense of Chiara.
127	54	"Inheritance"	"Unloved"	July 20, 2023	4.7%
After finding out the truth from Olga, Chiara makes it her mission to unravel the mystery of her identity an asks Nico to help her. Ador sneaks inside Cielo's room, only to get stunned upon finding the late Fiero patriarch's last will and testament.
128	55	"Falsified"	"Falsified"	July 21, 2023	4.2%
After finding a crucial piece of information in old CCTV footage and learning the truth about Chiara's identity from Nico, Alexa seeks Lemuel's help in investigating the roots of Carlos' daughter. Aidan convinces Mila to return to the Fiero mansion.
129	56	"Sisters"	"Revelations"	July 24, 2023	4.8%
After successfully taking Olivia's ashes, Mila and her team finally hold a funeral for their departed loved ones. While Nico meets with Chiara to reveal the heartbreaking truth, Mila makes a desperate move to confirm her hunch about the young Fiero.
130	57	"Versions of Truth"	"Encounter"	July 25, 2023	4.2%
Chiara hears Carlos' version of the truth as she confronts him about the malicious allegations against their family. While Alexa struggles to come to terms with her recent discovery, Rolando learns valuable information regarding their enemies.
131	58	"Meet-up"	"Unveil"	July 26, 2023	4.8%
After getting her father's side of the story, Chiara meets with Nico to clear her family's name. Unknown to Alexa's team, this meet-up puts their mission on the line as Clint and Chiara catch Abe talking to Nico.
132	59	"Manhunt"	"Pursuit"	July 27, 2023	4.7%
With his deceit exposed, Rolando runs for his life as the vicious Fieros hunt him down. Leona lashes out at Chiara for hiding Nico's identity and his connection to Abe from them, which Alexa witnesses.
133	60	"Under One Roof"	"Unite"	July 28, 2023	5.2%
Lemuel pledges alliance with Alexa's team by taking Rolando and the others under his protection. Guilt fills Mila when Aidan vows to trust her despite his family's misgivings, unaware that her husband is doing an investigation of his own.
134	61	"Daughters"	"Unravel"	July 31, 2023	4.6%
While Chiara continues to suffer her family's wrath for the whole Nico-Abe hullabaloo. Mila struggles to hold back her emotions as she sees her sister deal with her truths. Abe manages to unravel another Fiero secret.
135	62	"Truth Bombs"	"Unmasked"	August 1, 2023	5.1%
Feliz's and Chiara's worlds come crashing down when they discover the truth about their identities. While Aidan inches closer to unmasking his wife's true face, emotions get the best of Alexa as she makes a rash move to comfort her sister.
136	63	"Avenger"	"Specify"	August 2, 2023	5.0%
While the Fieros hunt her down upon discovering her true identity, Alexa faces her team's fury as her reckless decision puts their mission in peril. Struggling to cope with his wife's betray, Aidan goes off the deep end.
137	64	"Survivor"	"Proof"	August 3, 2023	5.0%
Now that all its members have been unmasked, Alexa's team thinks of a new plan to exact revenge on the Fieros. Still doubtful of Carlos' version of the truth, Chiara turns to Feliz for answers about what really happen in the past.
138	65	"Out in the Open"	"Dirty Fieros"	August 4, 2023	4.8%
To give her allies an opportunity to make a move, Alexa finally comes forward to expose the Fieros' dirty linen. Torn between his family and the woman he loves, Aidan decides to meet with Mila.
139	66	"Skeletons in the Laundry"	"Skeleton"	August 7, 2023	5.6%
Nico tries to convince Abe and the rest to leave El Hambra after he and Mila almost got caught by Carlos. Cielo asks for Alejandro's help clearing her family's name, unaware that Pilar has unearthed one of Fieros' skeletons in the closet.
140	67	"Gunpoint"	"Gunpoint"	August 8, 2023	6.2%
Alarmed over Lemuel's new evidence, Doña Cielo thinks of a way to vindicate her family. Lala and Max enlist Nico and Dennis' help to get ahold of Chiara in an effort to clear Alexa's path to vengeance, unwittingly putting the teens' lives in danger.
141	68	"Manipulations"	"Manipulate"	August 9, 2023	4.7%
While Nico and Dennis' lives hang in the balance, the guilty Fieros brainwash Chiara into thinking the worst of her friends and Alexa. A new police chief takes over the case involving the influential clan.
142	69	"Outrage"	"Outrage"	August 10, 2023	5.8%
Leona unexpectedly allows Chiara to visit Nico in the hospital. After Lemuel confirms that the remains found at Alejandro's house belong to Olivia, Alexa publicly expresses her rage toward the Fieros as she finally lays her mother to rest.
143	70	"Torture"	"Abduction"	August 11, 2023	5.5%
Abe gets an opportunity to settle the score with Ador after Lala and Max managed to abduct the Fiero scapegoat. Carlos flies into a rage as he confronts Doña Cielo and Feliz about the truth.
144	71	"End is Near"	"Deadline"	August 14, 2023	5.6%
Max urges Rolando not to be blinded by rage and become the monsters they are fighting. Feliz lashes out at her family for showing no concern over Ador's disappearance, only to receive a shocking news before the day ends.
145	72	"Rapist"	"Predator"	August 15, 2023	4.8%
A devastated Feliz draws a line between her family and the rest of the Fieros, blaming the latter for Ador's tragic fate. Later, Alejandro's crime against Cielo finally comes to light, while Chiara gets stunned by another horrifying revelation.
146	73	"Dirty Little Secret"	"Dirty Secret"	August 16, 2023	5.5%
As Carlos gets away with attacking Max through Olga's help, Alexa's team takes the fight for justice to social media. Upon discovering the ugly truth about the family she grew up in, Chiara leaves the Fiero mansion and heads to her sister.
147	74	"Dreams and Realities"	"Illusion"	August 17, 2023	5.5%
As Aidan looks for answers to his nightmares, a shocking discovery about the night Olivia died pushes him to surrender to the police. However, Carlos pulls a trick up his sleeve to prevent his son from ending up in jail.
148	75	"Explosion"	"Explosion"	August 18, 2023	5.5%
Aidan refuses to be part of his family's iniquity anymore after Leona posted bail for him and Carlos. Doña Cielo visits the Blazing Fiero cockpit arena for the last time, only to encounter Rolando amid his team's explosive revenge plot.
149	76	"Fallen"	"Fallen"	August 21, 2023	5.4%
Falling into deepest pit of grief following Cielo's demise, Carlos lightens his grip on his family as he vows to get back at Abe and his accomplices. Feliz overhears their kitchen staff talking about Precious' sudden departure.
150	77	"Trapped"	"Trapped"	August 22, 2023	5.2%
An unsuspecting Carlos sells the Blazing Fiero Corporation to a businessman with a silent partner. Aidan moves to get Chiara out of the Fiero mansion, unaware that Alexa is also on a dangerous quest to rescue her sister.
151	78	"The Ugly Truth"	"Ugly Truth"	August 23, 2023	5.1%
Max finally confesses his love for Lala. Feliz locks horns with Carlos upon learning of his plan for their family. The whole truth surrounding Olivia's death is revealed as Alexa gets into a heated confrontation with Leona.
152	79	"The Final Sacrifice"	"Abandon"	August 24, 2023	6.0%
While Rolando, Lala, and Max work with Aidan to save Alexa, Nico and Chiara get dragged into the fray as Carlos' men abduct the young Fiero. Soon, Carlos' destructive wrath brings more pain to Alexa's team.
153	80	"Explosive Ending"	"Pagwawakas"	August 25, 2023	5.6%
Aidan rushes to save Leona from Alexa's vengeful wrath, until he learns the horrifying truth about Olivia's death. As Carlos pulls off his last trick, Alexa and Aidan race against time to get their loved ones out of harm's way.
