= Hawak Kamay (TV series) =

2014 Philippine television drama series

- Title card
- Also known as: Instant Dad
- Genre: Family drama; Slice of life; Comedy
- Created by: ABS-CBN Studios; Willy Laconsay; John Roque
- Developed by: ABS-CBN Studios
- Written by: Clarissa Estuar; Kay Brondial; Genesis Rodriguez; Jessel Duque; Raymund Barcelon; Tanya Winona Bautista; Margarette Labrador; Michael Transfiguracion; Carmela Abaygar; Cherry Villaluz; Erica Bautista
- Directed by: Jerry Lopez Sineneng; Mae Czarina Cruz-Alviar; Rechie A. del Carmen; Erick C. Salud; Ricky S. Rivero
- Starring: Piolo Pascual; Iza Calzado; Nikki Gil; Xyriel Manabat; Andrea Brillantes; Zaijian Jaranilla; Yesha Camile
- Opening theme: "Hawak Kamay" by Piolo Pascual
- Composer: Yeng Constantino
- Country of origin: Philippines
- Original language: Filipino
- No. of episodes: 90

Production
- Executive producer: Adjanet Fresco Rase
- Producers: Mavic Holgado-Oducayen; Justine F. Javier
- Production location: Philippines
- Editor: Alexces Megan Abarquez
- Running time: 28–32 minutes Monday - Friday at 20:00 (PST)
- Production companies: RSB Unit (now RSB Scripted Format and RGE Drama Unit)

Original release
- Network: ABS-CBN
- Release: July 21 – November 21, 2014

Hawak Kamay (International title: Instant Dad / transl. Hold Hands) is a 2014 Philippine television drama family series broadcast by ABS-CBN. Directed by Jerry Lopez Sineneng, Mae Czarina Cruz-Alviar, Rechie A. del Carmen, Erick C. Salud and Ricky S. Rivero, it stars Piolo Pascual, Iza Calzado, Nikki Gil, Xyriel Manabat, Andrea Brillantes, Zaijian Jaranilla and Yesha Camile. It aired on the network's Primetime Bida line up and worldwide on TFC from July 21 to November 21, 2014, replacing Mars Ravelo's Dyesebel and was replaced by Dream Dad.

== Synopsis ==
Gin Agustin (Piolo Pascual) is a frustrated musician who becomes the guardian of the three orphans that his late sister adopted: Emong (Zaijian Jaranilla), Dara (Xyriel Manabat), and Ningning (Yesha Camile). Gin is unprepared to be the guardian of three young children, but with the help of the strict attorney Bianca Magpantay (Iza Calzado) and her sister (later revealed to be her daughter) Lorrie (Andrea Brillantes), Gin learns how to be a good parental figure to these three children. Different trials threaten to tear them apart, but Gin becomes determined to fight to keep all of them together and give them a complete family along with Atty. Bianca and Lorrie. Little by little they realize that it isn't important that they aren't related by blood because love makes a family.

== Cast and characters ==
=== Main cast ===
- Piolo Pascual as Eugene "Gin" B. Agustin
- Iza Calzado as Atty. Bianca Magpantay-Agustin
- Zaijian Jaranilla as Raymond "Emong" A. Vitorio / Raymond M. Agustin
- Xyriel Manabat as Sandara "Dara" Nicholas / Sandara M. Agustin
- Andrea Brillantes as Lorraine "Lorrie" M. Caballero
- Yesha Camile as Bituin "Ningning" A. Vitorio / Princess A. dela Rama

=== Supporting cast ===
- Nikki Gil as Meryl Ann "Meann" Marcelo
- Juan Karlos Labajo as Charles Kenneth "CK" Rodríguez
- Nadia Montenegro as Grace Catacutan
- Atoy Co as Santi Marcelo
- Gilleth Sandico as Chayong Marcelo
- Leo Rialp as Renato Magpantay
- Evangeline Pascual as Patrice Magpantay
- Hyubs Azarcon as Otoy
- Rubi Rubi as Baby
- Ana Abad Santos as Denise Rodriguez
- Moi Bien as Rihanna
- Jess Mendoza as Tolits
- Lloyd Zaragoza as Rambo
- Dianne Medina as Christina
- Axel Torres as Icko Mendoza
- Maris Racal as Wendy
- Manolo Pedrosa as Mikey
- Nichole Baranda as Hazel
- Jacob Dionisio as Rafael "Paeng" Marcelo
- Crispin Pineda as Edgar
- Cara Eriguel as Yanie
- Ryan Bang as Bok
- Fatima Cadiz as Yaya Fatima

=== Guest cast ===
- Boboy Garrovillo as Ethan Mendoza
- Ahron Villena as Shred De Vera
- Bernard Palanca as Jacob Caballero
- Brenna Garcia as Erika
- Belle Mariano as Cherry
- Harvey Bautista as Alfonso
- Manuel Chua as Arnold
- Victor Neri as Pedring
- John Regala as Leonardo Salonga
- Teresa Loyzaga as Dra. Carmen Ignacio
- Edgar Allan Guzman as Anton dela Rama
- Lyca Gairanod as Lilet
- Nadine Samonte as Grace dela Rama

=== Special participation ===
- Tirso Cruz III as Philip Agustin
- JM de Guzman as Brian Agustin
- Pinky Amador as Wilma Agustin
- Precious Lara Quigaman as Sophia Bustos-Agustin
- Jason Abalos as young Philip
- Jennifer Sevilla as Lily Agustin-Vitorio
- Lander Vera Perez as Borge Vitorio
- Regine Angeles as young Wilma
- Jairus Aquino as teen Gin
- Vangie Martelle as teen Lily
- CX Navarro as young Brian
- Yogo Singh as Coby
- Bea Basa as Marjorie
- Karl Angala as Fred
- Jenny Miller as Maristel
- Justin Cuyugan as Marcus
- Alyyson McBride as Chloe dela Rama
- Raiko Matteo

== Awards and nominations ==
29th PMPC Star Awards for Television
BEST PRIMETIME SERIES	Hawak Kamay	Nominated
BEST DRAMA ACTOR	Piolo Pascual	Nominated
BEST SUPPORTING ACTOR	JM de Guzman	Nominated
BEST SUPPORTING ACTOR	Tirso Cruz III	Nominated
BEST CHILD PERFORMER	Xyriel Manabat	Nominated
BEST CHILD PERFORMER	Zaijan Jaranilla	Nominated

== Promotion ==
This show has been developed following the success of Annaliza as part of a lineup of RSB Drama Unit due its genre of family, values, and child-oriented drama series. It was succeeded by Langit Lupa in 2016.

== See also ==
- List of programs broadcast by ABS-CBN
- List of ABS-CBN Studios original drama series
