= 18th Rose =

Philippine coming-of-age film

- Official release poster
- Directed by: Dolly Dulu
- Written by: Dolly Dulu; John Carlo Pacala
- Produced by: Omar Sortijas
- Starring: Xyriel Manabat; Kyle Echarri
- Production company: Clever Minds Inc.
- Distributed by: Netflix
- Release date: April 9, 2026
- Running time: 131 minutes
- Country: Philippines
- Languages: Filipino; English

18th Rose is a 2026 Philippine coming-of-age romantic drama film directed by Dolly Dulu from a screenplay he co-wrote with John Carlo Pacala. The film stars Xyriel Manabat in her first leading role in a feature film, and Kyle Echarri.

== Plot ==
Rose is a free-spirited teenager in Romblon, back in the early 2000s, who meets life's challenges head on. At school she becomes enamored with the music lover Jordan and the two gradually bond over their lifelong dreams and love of music.

== Cast ==
- Xyriel Manabat as Rose
- Kyle Echarri as Jordan
- Nikki Valdez as Tess
- Cris Villanueva as Rene
- Yayo Aguila as Mercy
- Cai Cortez as Berta
- Donna Cariaga as Ms. Melai
- Kira Balinger as Mara
- VJ Mendoza as Gibo
- Timothy Castillo as Samgi
- Kenken Nuyad as Toni
- Felicity Kyle Napuli as Gela
- Steven Cadd as Ewan
- Chantei Cortez as Rufa
- Johnrick Noynay as Bitoy
- Lyle Viray as Dimaguiba
- Tuesday Vargas as Contest Judge
- RS Francisco as Contest Judge
- Benedix Ramos as Star Seekers Host

== Production ==
Netflix officially disclosed the film as part of its "Next on Netflix Philippines" 2026 slate during a press event on February 9, 2026, at the Grand Hyatt Manila. Dolly Dulu was announced as the director of the film from a screenplay he co-wrote with John Carlo Pacala, with Xyriel Manabat and Kyle Echarri in the lead. Principal photography took place over the course of one month in Romblon, a location chosen to highlight the province's "lesser-seen parts". According to Dulu, the early 2000s setting was based on his personal experiences growing up in the era, citing the "simpler" nature of life and romance prior to the presence of social media. To prepare for their roles, Manabat and Echarri underwent chemistry workshops to develop their romantic rapport and on-screen dynamic.

Manabat described her character in the film as "light" and "free spirited". She noted that she and co-star Echarri began filming with a playful dynamic, before gradually settling into the more serious tone required for their characters. Echarri was all praise towards co-star Manabat who said in part, "when we go to the set, we don't read the script until we get to the cameras. And when we get to the set, we change all the lines."

== Release ==
18th Rose was released on Netflix on April 9, 2026.

== Reception ==
=== Viewership ===
18th Rose was met with praises from viewers and quickly rose to number two on Netflix's top 10 movies in the Philippines. Later that week, the film debuted at number seven on Netflix's Global Top 10 Non-English Movies chart with 1.7 million viewership during the week of 6–12 April 2026. The film slipped to number nine the following week, 13–19 April 2026, gaining a further 1.4 million viewership worldwide on its second week on the chart.

=== Critical response ===
Decider contributor Radhika Menon positively reviewed the film, highlighting the convincing chemistry between leads Echarri and Manabat despite a slow narrative start. Menon also described Manabat as a "scene stealer", praising her ability to use subtle facial expressions to portray her character's growth from a carefree youth to an adult facing mature challenges. Midgard Times writer Anjali Sharma rated the film 5.5 out of 10 stars, criticizing the repetitive portions and inconsistent dialogue, but commended the cinematography, setting, and the engaging portrayals of Echarri and Manabat.

Writing for ABS-CBN, Fred Hawson remarked that the film "followed a very familiar rom-com formula" with a "melodramatic subject matter" that he didn't particularly like but was carried by the "unexpected chemistry" of the lead actors. Inquirer Bandera writer Pauline del Rosario stated that the film effectively relied on early 2000s nostalgia and an authentic depiction of provincial life to ground its simple, opposites attract storyline, further commending Echarri and Manabat's natural performances.
