= Dirty Linen (TV series) =

Philippine mystery drama television

- Season 2 Promotional poster
- Genre: Mystery; Action; Drama; Thriller; Revenge
- Written by: Kay Conlu-Brondial; Bridgette Anne Rebuca; Jayson Arvene Mondragon; Maribel Ilag
- Directed by: Onat A. Diaz; Andoy L. Ranay; Raymund B. Ocampo
- Starring: Janine Gutierrez; Zanjoe Marudo; Francine Diaz; Seth Fedelin
- Music by: Idonnah C. Villarico; Rommel C. Villarico
- Country of origin: Philippines
- Original language: Filipino
- No. of seasons: 2
- No. of episodes: 153 (list of episodes)

Production
- Executive producers: Carlo L. Katigbak; Cory V. Vidanes; Laurenti M. Dyogi; Roldeo T. Endrinal
- Producers: Ronald D. Atianzar; Hazel Bolisay-Parfan
- Production location: Lipa, Batangas
- Cinematography: Michael Jacinto; Ronald Jacinto; Dustin Uy
- Editor: Roi Francia
- Running time: 19–46 minutes
- Production company: Dreamscape Entertainment

Original release
- Network: Kapamilya Channel (Note: The series was also aired on A2Z, Jeepney TV, Kapamilya Online Live, TV5, and worldwide via The Filipino Channel. It is also available on-demand via iWantTFC.)
- Release: January 23 – August 25, 2023

Dirty Linen is a Philippine mystery drama television series airing on Kapamilya Channel. Directed by Onat A. Diaz, Andoy L. Ranay and Raymond B. Ocampo, it stars Janine Gutierrez, Zanjoe Marudo, Seth Fedelin and Francine Diaz. It aired on the network's Primetime Bida line up and worldwide on TFC from January 23 to August 25, 2023.

== Plot ==
A nanny, a driver, and two laundrywomen of a wealthy, aristocratic family mysteriously vanish one by one without a trace. Years later, the four houseworkers' respective family members and loved ones are out to get their revenge against the prominent family itself. To exact vengeance, they infiltrate the household under different identities in order to expose their dirty secrets. However, an encounter with the family's eldest son in the past will lead to obstacles getting in the way of the revenge plot.

== Cast and characters ==
=== Main ===
- Janine Gutierrez as Alexa D. Salvacion / Mila Dela Cruz-Fiero
  - Erika Clemente as young Alexa
- Zanjoe Marudo as Aidan R. Fiero
  - Enzo Pelojero as young Aidan
- Francine Diaz as Chiara D. Fiero
- Seth Fedelin as Nicolas "Nico" M. Sinag

=== Supporting ===
- John Arcilla as Carlos F. Fiero
- Janice de Belen as Leona Roque-Fiero
- Angel Aquino as Ma. Feliz F. Fiero-Pavia
- Joel Torre as Rolando "Olan" Sinag / Abe Matias
- Epy Quizon as Salvador "Ador" Pavia
- JC Santos as Sr. Inspector Lemuel M. Onore
- Christian Bables as Joseph Maximus "Max" Dionisio
  - JJ Quilantang as young Max
- Jennica Garcia as Lailani "Lala" Millado
  - Althea Ruedas as young Lala
- Elisse Joson as Sophie Madrigales (season 2; recurring season 1)
- Xyriel Manabat as Antonette "Tonet" F. Pavia
- Raven Rigor as Clint F. Pavia
- Tessie Tomas as Doña Cielo F. Fiero
  - Jane Oineza as young Cielo

=== Extended ===
- Andrea Del Rosario as Atty. Olga Arguelles
- Rubi Rubi as Precious Magtibay
- Tart Carlos as Marisol
- CJ Navato as Dennis
- Ping Medina as Hector Tantoco
- Angelica Lao as Bella Pineda
- Lance Carr as Matt Villanueva
- Sean Tristan as Ace
- Bart Guingona as Silvio Madrigales
- Raphael Robes as Villejo Meneses
- Rans Rifol as Stella Baldomar
- Hazel Orencio as Marites
- Apey Obera as Glory
- Kert Montante as Larry
- Susan Africa as Pilar M. Onore
- Soliman Cruz as Chief Alejandro Isidro
  - Joem Bascon as young Alejandro

=== Guest ===
- Arnold Reyes as Jego Salvacion
- Dolly de Leon as Olivia de Mesa-Salvacion
- Karl Medina as Noel Dionisio
- Liza Diño as Mariza "Riza" Manalo-Sinag
- Ruby Ruiz as Lydia Millado
- RK Bagatsing as Don Christopher "Chris" Fiero

== Episodes ==
| Season | Episodes | Originally released | |
| Season | Episodes | First released | Last released |
|---|---|---|---|
| 1 | 73 | January 23, 2023 | May 5, 2023 |
| 2 | 80 | May 8, 2023 | August 25, 2023 |

== Production ==
On May 17, 2022, Janine Gutierrez, Zanjoe Marudo, Francine Diaz and Seth Fedelin were cast in the lead roles. Principal photography commenced in July 2022 and filming took place in Lipa, Batangas.

== Release ==
This series premiered on Kapamilya Channel, Kapamilya Online Live, A2Z, Jeepney TV, TV5 and worldwide via The Filipino Channel from January 23 to August 25, 2023. It is also available on-demand via iWantTFC. The 12-episode exclusive cut were released on September 7, 2023 to Amazon Prime Video on 240 countries and territories worldwide.

== Reception ==
With more than 40,000 tweets, the series' official hashtag was among the top trending topics in the Philippines as the pilot aired on Monday (January 23). Dirty Linen has accumulated 500 million combined views across all leading social media platforms within its ten episodes and over 1 billion overall views as of March 2023. The series reached its peak viewership of more than 200,000 (concurrent live viewers) on YouTube on August 25, 2023 for its finale episode.

=== Critical response ===
Dirty Linen was met with widespread acclaim from critics and viewers for the "camera work, musical scoring and intriguing plot." Manila Standard gave the series a positive review, calling it a "new benchmark for PH drama series". It was also noted for its "compelling plot, suspenseful scenes, detail-oriented production and script, and a star-studded cast". Among the standouts includes Jennica Garcia and Xyriel Manabat, who were praised for their acting prowess and became one of the most talked about characters in the series online. Mark Angelo Ching of Pep PH also praised the series, lauding it for "changing the landscape" of teleseryes". Jet Valle of Business Mirror praised its subplots, the portrayals of each characters, the themes and the twists.

=== Ratings ===
According to the Nielsen NUTAM People Survey, Dirty Linen debuted with 3.6% TV rating, beating one of its timeslot rivals Poong, the Joseon Psychiatrist. The finale episode of the series received a TV rating of 5.5%, beating its timeslot rival Amazing Earth.

== Soundtrack ==
Dirty Linen (Original Soundtrack)

Soundtrack album by Various Artists
- Released: September 29, 2023
- Length: 28:57
- Language: Filipino
- Label: Star Music
- Producers: Rommel Villarico; Idonnah Villarico; Jonathan Manalo

| No. | Title | Writer(s) | Artist(s) | Length |
|---|---|---|---|---|
| 1. | "Simulan" | Edmund Perlas, Jonathan Manalo, Roque "Rox" Santos | Jed Madela | 3:30 |
| 2. | "Kung Makakapili Lang (from "Dirty Linen")" | Jonathan Manalo, Trisha Denise | Cesca | 4:30 |
| 3. | "Simulan (from "Dirty Linen")" | Edmund Perlas, Jonathan Manalo, Roque "Rox" Santos | Kice | 3:20 |
| 4. | "Dirty Linen Theme" | Idonnah Villarico | Rommel Villarico, Idonnah Villarico | 1:46 |
| 5. | "Fiero's World" | Idonnah Villarico | Rommel Villarico, Idonnah Villarico | 0:41 |
| 6. | "Revenge Squad's Recompense" | Idonnah Villarico | Rommel Villarico, Idonnah Villarico | 1:42 |
| 7. | "Blazing Fiero" (feat. Antonio Vivaldi's Concerto No. 4 in F Minor, "Winter" from "The Four Seasons") | Idonnah Villarico | Rommel Villarico, Idonnah Villarico | 1:16 |
| 8. | "Ador Chase, Househelp Flees" | Idonnah Villarico | Rommel Villarico, Idonnah Villarico | 0:32 |
| 9. | "Ulila" | Idonnah Villarico | Rommel Villarico, Idonnah Villarico | 3:39 |
| 10. | "Aidan Remorse" | Idonnah Villarico | Rommel Villarico, Idonnah Villarico | 1:27 |
| 11. | "Stay The Course" | Idonnah Villarico | Rommel Villarico, Idonnah Villarico | 3:29 |
| 12. | "Alexa's Theme" | Idonnah Villarico | Rommel Villarico, Idonnah Villarico | 2:45 |
| Total length: | | | | 28:57 |

== Accolades ==
| Year | Award | Category | Nominee(s) | Result | Ref. |
|---|---|---|---|---|---|
| 2023 | Asian Academy Creative Awards | Best Direction (Fiction) | Onat Diaz | Nominated | |
| 2023 | ContentAsia Awards | Best Asian Drama for a Single Market in Asia | Dirty Linen | Silver | |
| 2024 | VP Choice Awards | TV Series of the Year | Dirty Linen | Nominated | |
| 2024 | VP Choice Awards | TV Actress of the Year | Francine Diaz | Nominated | |
| 2024 | VP Choice Awards | TV Actor of the Year | Seth Fedelin | Nominated | |
| 2024 | VP Choice Awards | Breakthrough Star of the Year | Jennica Garcia | Nominated | |
| 2024 | VP Choice Awards | Breakthrough Star of the Year | Xyriel Manabat | Nominated | |
| 2024 | Gawad Lasallianeta Awards | Most Outstanding Teleserye | Dirty Linen | Won | |
| 2024 | Platinum Stallion Media Awards | Best Primetime Supporting Actress | Jennica Garcia | Won | |
| 2024 | Gawad Pasado Awards | Best Television Actress | Janine Gutierrez | Won | |
| 2024 | Gawad Pasado Awards | Best Television Actor | John Arcilla | Won | |
| 2024 | Gawad Pasado Awards | Best Television Series | Dirty Linen | Won | |
| 2025 | PMPC Star Awards for Television | Best Drama Actress | Janine Gutierrez | Nominated | |
| 2025 | PMPC Star Awards for Television | Best Drama Actor | Zanjoe Marudo | Nominated | |
| 2025 | PMPC Star Awards for Television | Best Drama Supporting Actress | Angel Aquino | Nominated | |
| 2025 | PMPC Star Awards for Television | Best Drama Supporting Actor | John Arcilla | Nominated | |
| 2025 | PMPC Star Awards for Television | Best Drama Supporting Actor | Joel Torre | Nominated | |
| 2025 | PMPC Star Awards for Television | Best Primetime Television Series | Dirty Linen | Nominated | |
| 2025 | PMPC Star Awards for Television | Best Child Performer | JJ Quilantang | Nominated | |
| 2025 | PMPC Star Awards for Television | Best Child Performer | Althea Ruedas | Nominated | |
| 2025 | PMPC Star Awards for Television | German Moreno Power Tandem Award | Francine Diaz | Won | |
| 2025 | PMPC Star Awards for Television | German Moreno Power Tandem Award | Seth Fedelin | Won | |
| 2025 | Gawad Tanglaw Awards | Best Actress | Janine Gutierrez | Won | |
| 2025 | Gawad Tanglaw Awards | Best Supporting Actress | Janice de Belen | Won | |
