= It's Okay to Not Be Okay (Philippine TV series) =

Philippine romantic comedy television series

- Midseason promotional poster
- Genre: Black comedy Romantic comedy Psychological drama
- Based on: It's Okay to Not Be Okay by Jo Yong
- Written by: Mary Pearl Urtola
- Directed by: Mae Cruz-Alviar; Raymund B. Ocampo
- Starring: Anne Curtis; Joshua Garcia; Carlo Aquino
- Music by: Jessie Lasaten
- Country of origin: Philippines
- Original languages: Filipino; English
- No. of episodes: 65

Production
- Executive producers: Carlo L. Katigbak; Cory V. Vidanes; Laurenti M. Diyogi
- Producers: Kristine Prudencio Sioson; Pamela Mendiola Quizon; Sackrey Prince Pendatun
- Production locations: Iloilo; Bacolod; Murcia, Negros Occidental; Silay, Negros Occidental; Manapla, Negros Occidental; Siquijor
- Cinematography: Dexter Dela Peña; Marcial Tarnate III
- Editor: Kathryn Jerry Perez
- Camera setup: Single-camera
- Running time: 21–33 minutes
- Production company: Star Creatives

Original release
- Network: Kapamilya Channel (Note: First released on Netflix and iWant that marketed as "advanced screening". It is currently airing on its primary network Kapamilya Channel as well as other blocktime channels and platforms.)
- Release: July 21 – October 17, 2025

Related
- It's Okay to Not Be Okay (South Korea)

It's Okay to Not Be Okay is a Philippine romantic comedy drama television series based on the 2020 South Korean television drama series of the same name. Directed by Mae Cruz-Alviar and Raymund B. Ocampo, it stars Anne Curtis, Joshua Garcia, and Carlo Aquino. It premiered on Kapamilya Channel's Primetime Bida evening block on July 21, 2025. The series concluded on October 17, 2025 with a total of 65 episodes.

== Premise ==
Mia (Anne Curtis), a woman diagnosed with an antisocial personality disorder gets romantically involved with Patpat (Joshua Garcia), a psych ward caretaker, who has dedicated his life to taking care of his autistic older brother Matthew, who is more known as Matmat (Carlo Aquino).

== Cast and characters ==
Cast

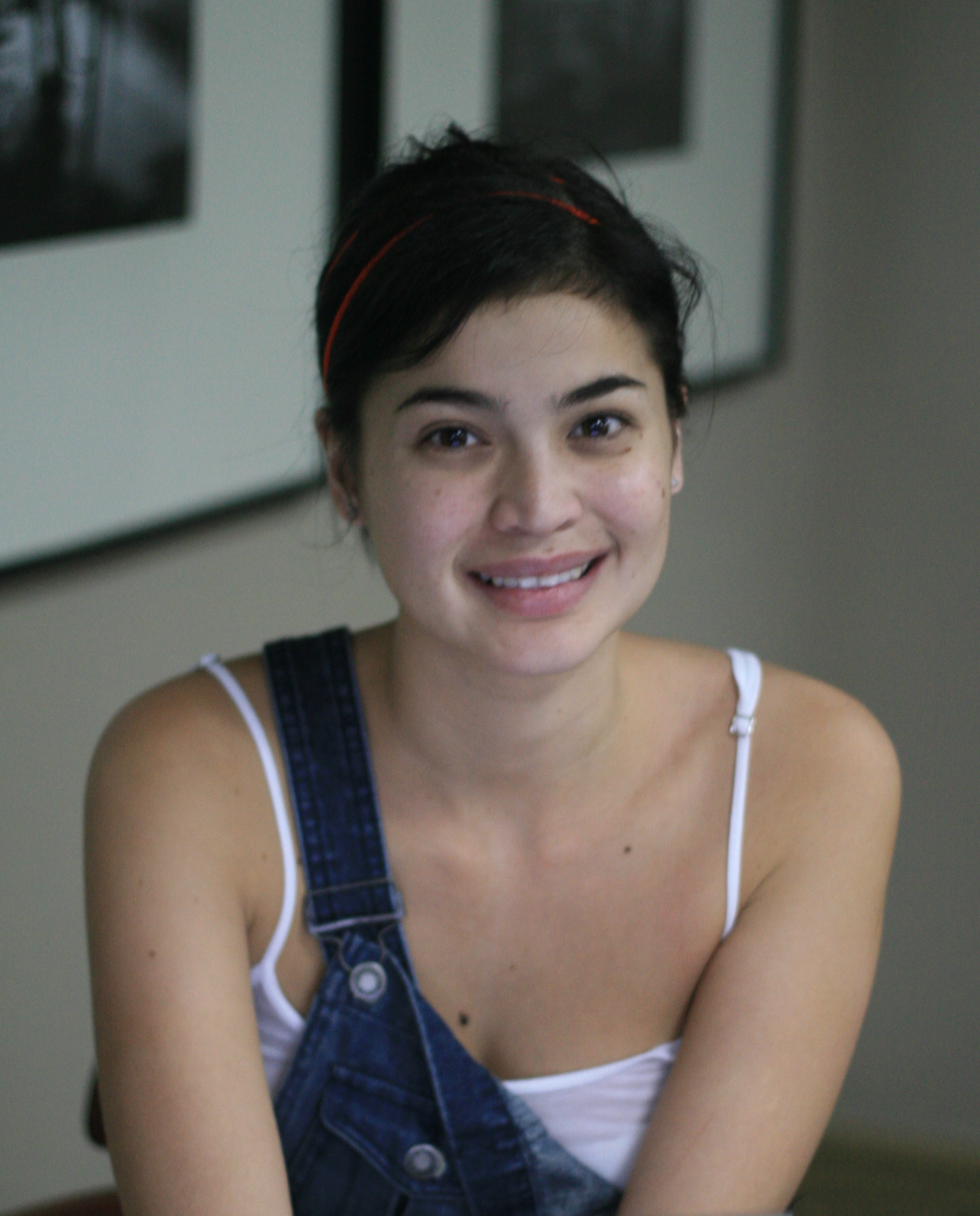
Anne Curtis

Joshua Garcia

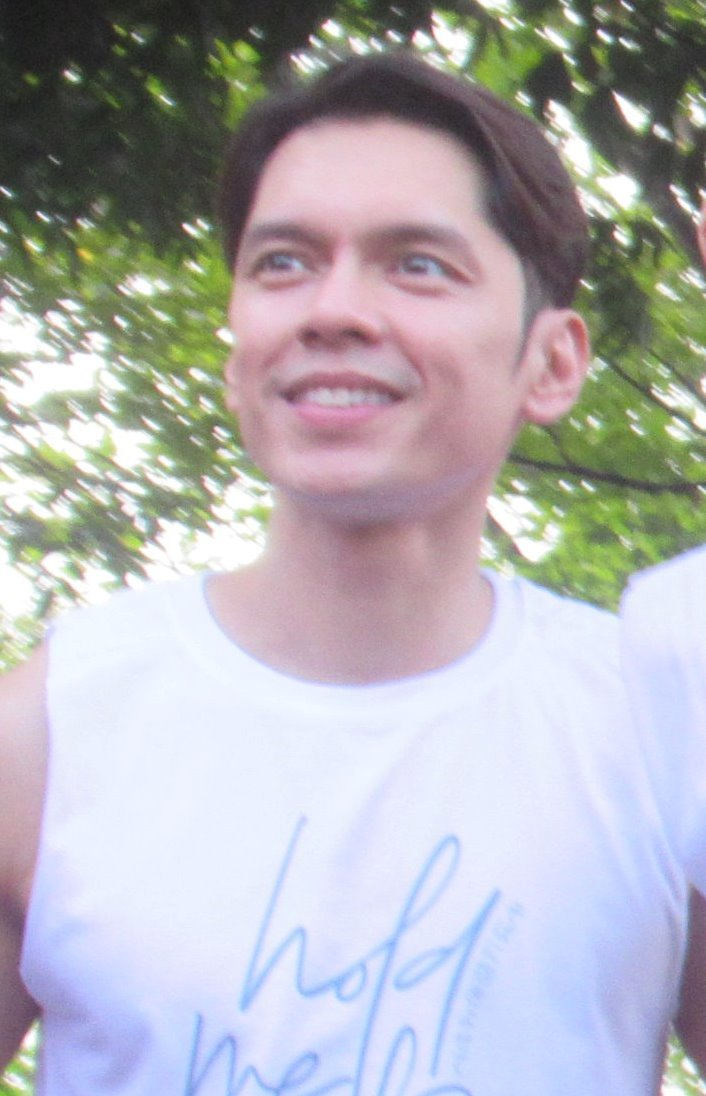
Carlo Aquino

Main cast

- Anne Curtis as Emilia "Mia" Hernandez
  - Ysabelle Suarez as young Mia
- Joshua Garcia as Patrick "Patpat" Gonzales
  - Nathan Bulalacao as young Patpat
- Carlo Aquino as Matthew "Matmat" Gonzales
  - Noel Comia Jr. as young Matmat

Supporting cast

- Enchong Dee as Vincent Romulo
- Xyriel Manabat as Madeth
- Kaori Oinuma as Gemma Bautista
- Francis Magundayao as Jason
- Agot Isidro as Eden/Ingrid Hernandez
  - Empress Schuck as young Ingrid Hernandez
- Maricel Laxa as Olivia Jose
  - Ara Davao as young Olivia Jose
- Michael de Mesa as Samuel Hernandez
  - Geoff Eigenmann as young Samuel
- Meryll Soriano as Tessie Gonzales
- Rio Locsin as Nanay Liwanag
- Edgar Mortiz as Anok Lumbera Sr.
- Louise Abuel as Kai
- Ana Abad Santos as Zelda
- Bodjie Pascua as Tommy
- Sharmaine Suarez as Elvie
- Alora Sasam as Cynthia Graciano / Chin-Chin
- Alyssa Muhlach as Patty
- Bianca de Vera as Bella
- Aljon Mendoza as Pogi/Junjun
- Mark Oblea as Emman Dalisay

Guest cast

- Sofia Andres as Jillian
- CJ Navato as a nurse
- JV Kapunan as Dennis Menteroso
- Karla Pambid
- Jong Cuenco as a Doctor
- Imogen Cantong as Zei
- Christian Vasquez as Alex Roces
- Froi Manto as a Doctor
- Briseis Quijano as Mona
- Audie Gemora
- Raul Montesa
- Gaye Piccio
- Raven Rigor as Vio
- Shanaia Gomez as a vlogger
- Natania Guerrero
- Epy Quizon
- Albie Casiño as Junjun Martinez
- Charlie Dizon as Jana

== Episodes ==
| No. | Title | Original air date (Note: iWant shows two episodes first in advance before it broadcasts on TV while Netflix shows three episodes in advance.) |
|---|---|---|
| 1 | "Once Upon a Same Day" | July 21, 2025 |
Patrick, a devoted nurse, balances his hospital duties with caring for his autistic brother, Matmat. A sudden encounter with Mia, a sharp-witted children’s book author known for her dark tales, resurfaces painful memories from his past, setting off a spark of tension and curiosity between them.
| 2 | "Destiny Finds Us" | July 22, 2025 |
Mia learns of her father's declining health but stubbornly resists his doctors' advice. Meanwhile, a patient’s escape from the hospital thrusts Patrick into a tense and violent struggle.
| 3 | "Shared Past" | July 23, 2025 |
Patrick fails to get Mia’s autograph for Matmat's book. When his colleague Vincent invites him to a workplace meeting, Patrick unexpectedly reunites with Mia.
| 4 | "Never Healed" | July 24, 2025 |
Vincent tries to win back Patrick’s trust with a generous offer. Determined to stay close to Patrick, Mia boldly invites Matmat to her book signing event, hoping to build a stronger connection.
| 5 | "Made by Scars" | July 25, 2025 |
Patrick is haunted by vivid memories of his difficult childhood. Matmat, thrilled to attend Mia’s author event, faces chaos when a misunderstanding spirals into disorder.
| 6 | "Safety Pin" | July 28, 2025 |
Mia's impulsive actions spark a viral sensation, causing trouble for Vincent and Madeth. When she extends an offer to Patrick, he responds with chilly reluctance, straining their relationship.
| 7 | "Shadow Break" | July 29, 2025 |
Hoping for peace, Patrick and Matmat relocate to Maravida. A nosy vlogger threatens to expose Mia’s deepest secret, jeopardling fear for her carefully guarded life.
| 8 | "Her Red Shoes" | July 30, 2025 |
Matmat forms a hopeful connection with his new doctor, lifting Patrick’s spirits. As a storm sweeps through Maravida, Mia arrives, and Patrick uncovers a fragment of his mother's hidden past.
| 9 | "Darkness Returns" | July 31, 2025 |
Gemma challenges Mia about her growing bond with Patrick. Later, Mia revisits her childhood mansion, where a shadowy presence stirs unsettling memories.
| 10 | "Fate Rewinds" | August 1, 2025 |
A patient's return to the hospital throws Patrick and the nursing staff into chaos. Meanwhile, Matmat hesitantly tests his skills at a new job.
| 11 | "Live Your Truth" | August 4, 2025 |
During a hospital workshop, Mia captivates attendees with her unconventional spin on classic fairy tales. Meanwhile, Matmat lands a paid art gig and excitedly shares his big plans for a dream purchase with Patrick.
| 12 | "Love Slap" | August 5, 2025 |
Mia's impulsive decision to flee with a patient sparks a high-stakes car chase and disrupts a local political event. Tensions rise as Eden and Olivia’s rivalry takes a dark and unexpected twist.
| 13 | "Bad Date" | August 6, 2025 |
Patrick grudgingly agrees to spend time with Mia while grappling with how to address her emotional state. Vincent, determined to bring Mia back to Manila, sets out to find her.
| 14 | "Got Hit" | August 7, 2025 |
Vincent turns to Patrick for assistance in a desperate plea. An encounter with Gemma at a restaurant stirs new complications, and the hospital staff faces chaos when two surprise guests arrive.
| 15 | "Empty Can" | August 8, 2025 |
Mia visits Matmat at the hospital, sparking Patrick’s frustration as their interaction deepens. A troubling confrontation between Mia and her father unearths painful family secrets.
| 16 | "Rain Knows" | August 11, 2025 |
Mia hints at a mysterious new housemate, while a longtime patient eyes Patrick as a match for her daughter. A confession leaves Gemma heartbroken.
| 17 | "Overnight Echoes" | August 12, 2025 |
Soaked from a downpour, Patrick brings Mia to his house for shelter. She stubbornly insists on staying, while Matmat confronts Patrick, accusing him of dishonesty about a physical altercation.
| 18 | "Not Owned by You" | August 13, 2025 |
A tense morning clash between Gemma and Mia escalates into a heated exchange, turning aggressive. Later, Patrick attempts to mend his strained relationship with Matmat.
| 19 | "Work Strings" | August 14, 2025 |
Mia vaguely mentions a mysterious person staying at her place, sparking curiosity. Meanwhile, a hospital patient sees Patrick as a potential suitor for her daughter. A heartfelt revelation devastates Gemma.
| 20 | "I Am Mine" | August 15, 2025 |
Matmat accepts a job as Mia’s illustrator, sparking tension with Patrick and straining their brotherly bond.
| 21 | "He is Back" | August 18, 2025 |
Patrick agrees to support Matmat’s new role but imposes strict terms. Meanwhile, Vincent confides in Madelyn about his business troubles.
| 22 | "Within Mansion Walls" | August 19, 2025 |
During the brothers' initial night staying over at Mia's place, she shares a scary story with Matmat. Meanwhile, a past coworker of Patrick's mom warns him about something important.
| 23 | "Daughter to Her" | August 20, 2025 |
As Matpat handles tasks at the hospital, Dr. Ano brings up a creepy question. Mia gets rattled by what a patient tells her in conversation.
| 24 | "Mother's Shadow" | August 21, 2025 |
Memories from the past haunt Mia, making it hard for her to deal. Due to various problems, the hospital decides on changes to Mia's teaching sessions.
| 25 | "Pull Closer" | August 22, 2025 |
Learning of Mia's visions, Vincent and Madeth attempt to make her move out, only for Patrick to stand up for her.
| 26 | "Clear Moment" | August 25, 2025 |
Mia describes her dream to Patrick, as Gemma and Vincent bump into each other at karaoke. Dr. Anok later inquires about Patrick's link to Mia.
| 27 | "Meet Satsat" | August 26, 2025 |
Patrick arrives home intoxicated and hands Mia a present linked to her bad dreams. Eden recommends a game with drinks to uncover details on Olivia.
| 28 | "Unleashed" | August 27, 2025 |
Back at the hospital, Mia runs into Elvie and her dad. Eden uncovers a mysterious note tucked in Samuel's bedding.
| 29 | "Little Traces" | August 28, 2025 |
Mia chooses to switch up her style, though Matmat objects. Madeth gathers info on Gemma to help Vincent's crush.
| 30 | "Slowly Together" | August 29, 2025 |
Dr. Anok instructs Patrick to watch Zelda closely since she's behaving weirdly. Mia, Patrick, and Matmat have a fun, relaxed time.
| 31 | "Not Hers" | September 1, 2025 |
Spotting Mia with Satsat, Matmat starts an argument that damages the doll. Eden shares an eerie chat with Samuel.
| 32 | "Rivalries" | September 2, 2025 |
Vincent and Madeth get cozy at Mama Li's despite Jason's irritation. Matmat says sorry to Mia, but adds a heads-up.
| 33 | "Is This Love?" | September 3, 2025 |
Talking about Kai's private romance, Patrick thinks about his own emotions for Mia. Bella gets teary in Mia's hospital lesson.
| 34 | "Out of Routine" | September 4, 2025 |
Defending Mia from Jerome gets Patrick suspended for 10 days. His idea for a couple's trip with Mia falls apart fast.
| 35 | "Cut Short" | September 5, 2025 |
Mia and Patrick patch things up, but their tender time gets cut off. Gemma tells Macbeth her troubles, getting straightforward suggestions.
| 36 | "Protecting You" | September 8, 2025 |
Samuel panics, thinking someone's after his life. Preparing for a getaway with Mia, Patrick talks openly with Dr. Anok.
| 37 | "Love is Patient" | September 9, 2025 |
Running into Kai and Bella, Patrick and Mia see the pair making the most of their limited time. Eden sees a fight break out at the hospital.
| 38 | "Breaking Chains" | September 10, 2025 |
Patrick starts revealing his affection for Mia, as Matmat worries waiting for him. Eden suspects Olivia's dealings with Samuel.
| 39 | "Death Wish" | September 11, 2025 |
Kai and Bella have a sad parting. Eden calls out Olivia for breaking rules, while Matmat catches wind of Patrick and Mia's talk.
| 40 | "Brothers' Rift" | September 12, 2025 |
Following Matmat's blow-up, Mia comforts Patrick who's still down. Staff fret over the brothers' falling out.
| 41 | "Short-Lived Flame" | September 15, 2025 |
Recovering in the hospital, Matmat spots a book with an odd message. Mia calls out Patrick for being quiet lately.
| 42 | "Mama Dinosaur" | September 16, 2025 |
Mama Li tasks Gemma and Vincent with a shared chore, as Eden hangs out with Matmat. Gemma gives Patrick some tips.
| 43 | "Rounds of Comfort" | September 17, 2025 |
Patrick's sorry tears bring the brothers back together warmly. Mia makes Gemma eat and drink with her.
| 44 | "When We Miss" | September 18, 2025 |
Reminiscing about kid days, Mia admits she longs for Patrick around the house.
| 45 | "Birthday Blues" | September 19, 2025 |
A tune sets off Samuel to lash at Zelda and threaten Patrick. On her birthday, Mia turns to Mama Li for support but gets a twist.
| 46 | "Secret Greetings" | September 22, 2025 |
Mia thinks back to last year's birthday, Eden grabs a cake for a dear one, and Patrick races to Zelda after Pogi's assault.
| 47 | "To Her Surprise" | September 23, 2025 |
Patrick reaches Mia's home, only to find an ominous scene. As Mia confronts him over his priorities, he stumbles through his feelings for her.
| 48 | "One Fight Day" | September 24, 2025 |
Gemma agrees to a coffee date with Vincent. Mia makes a promise to Patrick after he reveals the real reason behind Matmat's trauma.
| 49 | "Bringing Closer" | September 25, 2025 |
After clashing with Matmat, Mia seeks his approval. News of Samuel's health devastates the hospital staff, especially Olivia.
| 50 | "His Dream World" | September 26, 2025 |
Patrick shares his new outlook on life with Jason. Gemma and Mama Li try to soften Matmat, then discuss Gemma's date with Vincent.
| 51 | "Be My Brother" | September 29, 2025 |
Jason complains about his dwindling chances at love with Gemma. Matmat and Patrick share a fancy meal together - but balk when the bill arrives.
| 52 | "Butterfly Effect" | September 30, 2025 |
Patrick and Mia discuss the future together while filming a video for her new endorsement. Gemma grows weary as Vincent spends time with her ex.
| 53 | "The Real Butterfly" | October 1, 2025 |
Newly discharged from the hospital, Tommy has a terrifying episode in a bus, forcing Matmat to spring into action. Later, Matmat faces his own fears.
| 54 | "Enduring Truths" | October 2, 2025 |
As Patrick grapples with a heartbreaking truth, he searches for answers. Gemma urges Mia to visit her dying father, while Eden and Olivia clash again.
| 55 | "Family Picture" | October 3, 2025 |
Mia's family photo shoot with the brothers hits a roadblock when Patrick refuses to take part. But a hidden note leads to a change of heart.
| 56 | "Beyond Fear" | October 6, 2025 |
As Matmat tries to draw butterflies, he meets a new illustration challenge, crafting facial expressions. Patrick tries to get answers out of Samuel.
| 57 | "Patient Samuel" | October 7, 2025 |
An ailing Samuel makes a startling confession to Patrick, Eden and Olivia as he recalls a terrifying night from his past.
| 58 | "The Last Secret" | October 8, 2025 |
After an escape at the hospital, the staff searches for the missing patient. Patrick urges Mia to face the truth, while Dr. Anok expresses his doubts.
| 59 | "Your Care, My Care" | October 9, 2025 |
The appearance of a butterfly drawing on Matmat's mural causes him to break down. Mia recognizes the unique design, leading to a harrowing realization.
| 60 | "Rekindled" | October 10, 2025 |
Vincent urges Mia to meet him, while Patrick finds a book belonging to Ingrid. When Madeth's brother starts to bully her, Jason steps up to defend her.
| 61 | "Dance with Danger" | October 13, 2025 |
After checking security footage, Patrick races to find who painted over Matmat's mural. The group debates how to handle Olivia and Eden.
| 62 | "The Real Face" | October 14, 2025 |
Mia worries Patrick and the group when she rushes off for an errand. Gemma and Vincent have a heart-to-heart conversation about the future.
| 63 | "Return to Me" | October 15, 2025 |
As the truth becomes clear, Patrick urges caution but Mia remains defiant, as she and Matmat attend an interview for the new book.
| 64 | "Face the Monster" | October 16, 2025 |
With Matmat in danger, Mia and Patrick rush to the house to save him. Patrick learns new information about his mother's death.
| 65 | "Happy Day" | October 17, 2025 |
After a harrowing night, Patrick and Mia find solace in one another, while Matmat finally gets the gift of his dreams.

== Production ==
=== Development ===
On December 13, 2023, the series was announced as part of ABS-CBN's 2024 programming line-up.

Business Unit Head for Star Creatives Lourdes de Guzman expressed excitement stating:

"We are immensely grateful for the opportunity to retell and reimagine the much-loved drama series It’s Okay to Not Be Okay. We believe its story of love and resilience in overcoming great emotional and mental struggles is very relevant to today’s times."

Vice President of the International Business Department at CJ ENM Sebastian Kim added:

"We’re thrilled to see It’s Okay to Not Be Okay reimagined by ABS-CBN for Filipino audiences. Format adaptations like this are a powerful way to introduce our content to new viewers, while celebrating the universal themes that connect us all. Moving forward, we aim to reach even more global audiences and make CJ ENM stories a familiar part of everyday entertainment around the world."

A media conference was held on May 17, 2024. This is the Filipino adaptation of It's Okay to Not Be Okay produced by Star Creatives.

=== Casting ===
Liza Soberano and Enrique Gil were initially reported to cast in the lead roles, but both declined the offer. Instead, Anne Curtis, Joshua Garcia, and Carlo Aquino were announced for its lead roles. Joining alongside are Rio Locsin, Edgar Mortiz, Michael de Mesa, Maricel Laxa, Agot Isidro, Enchong Dee, Kaori Oinuma, Bodjie Pascua, Ana Abad Santos, Sharmaine Suarez, Xyriel Manabat, Louise Abuel, Francis Magundayao, Alora Sasam, Alyssa Muhlach, Bianca de Vera, Aljon Mendoza, and Mark Oblea.

=== Filming ===
Principal photography commenced on July 2024 in Iloilo and the Negros provinces. Filming wrapped on April 24, 2025.

== Marketing ==
The first teaser for the series was revealed on December 10, 2024. The official poster was revealed on June 26, 2025.

A special screening attended by the cast and invited celebrity guests was held on July 17, 2025 at Trinoma.

The series also held three media conferences. First media conference to kick-off the show was held in early July 2025. The second press conference took place in August 2025, few weeks after its release and receiving positive feedback from its audience. The finale media conference was held in late September 2025, few weeks before the show wrapped up.

During the finale media conference, the show announced the release of its official merchandise.

== Release ==
The series was first released on Netflix on July 18, 2025, and on iWant on the following day. It premiered on Kapamilya Channel and other television channels & platforms on July 21, 2025. The series originally consisted of 65 episodes before it extended to 80 episodes. It is now pushed back to 65 episodes.

== Soundtrack ==
It's Okay to Not Be Okay (Original Soundtrack)

Soundtrack album by Various Artists
- Released: August 22, 2025
- Length: 24:06
- Languages: Filipino; English
- Label: Star
- Producer: Jonathan Manalo

The official soundtrack released on August 22, 2025.

| No. | Title | Writer(s) | Artist(s) | Length |
|---|---|---|---|---|
| 1. | "Kathang Isip" | Paolo Benjamin G. Guico | Ben&Ben, Angela Ken | 5:07 |
| 2. | "Sa Aking Tabi" | Maki | Maki | 4:29 |
| 3. | "Hiwaga" | Dana Balagtas | Dana Balagtas | 4:34 |
| 4. | "Bakit Naman Hindi" | Trisha Denise, Dennis Campañer | Trisha Denise | 2:57 |
| 5. | "Why Me" | Jeremy Eriq Glinoga | Belle Mariano | 3:45 |
| 6. | "Gising Gising" | Jonathan Manalo | Misha De Leon | 3:11 |
| Total length: | | | | 24:06 |

== Reception ==
=== Critical response ===
The first three episodes of this series was well received from critics. Adam Laurena and Chrishna Dela Peña of pikapika.ph praised "its strong performances, thoughtful writing, and visual flair, which is highlighted by folkloric animations and rich cinematography." JE Cabebe of LionhearTV said that this series "dares to fold with its storytelling with animation miniatures, and scene shifting surrealism."

=== Ratings and viewership ===
Upon its release, It's Okay to Not Be Okay debuted at number one on Netflix's most watch shows in the Philippines. The series opened with 608,595 peak concurrent live viewers on its premiere on Kapamilya Online Live.

According to AGB Nielsen Philippines' Nationwide Urban Television Audience Measurement People in television homes, the pilot episode of It's Okay to Not Be Okay earned a 7.5% rating. The finale episode scored a 4.5% rating.

== Accolades ==
| Year | Award-giving Body | Award | Recipient | Result | Ref. |
|---|---|---|---|---|---|
| 2026 | 8th Gawad Lasallianeta | Most Outstanding Teleserye | —N/a | Won | |
| 2026 | 8th Gawad Lasallianeta | Most Outstanding Actor/ Actress in a Lead Role | Anne Curtis | Won | |
| 2026 | 8th Gawad Lasallianeta | Most Outstanding Actor/ Actress in a Lead Role | Joshua Garcia | Nominated | |
| 2026 | Laurus Nobilis Media Excellence Awards 2026 | Media Excellence in Television Drama | —N/a | Nominated | |
| 2026 | Laurus Nobilis Media Excellence Awards 2026 | Media Excellence in Television Drama Acting (Female Category) | Anne Curtis | Nominated | |
| 2026 | Laurus Nobilis Media Excellence Awards 2026 | Media Excellence in Television Drama Acting (Male Category) | Joshua Garcia | Nominated | |
| 2026 | Content Asia Awards | Best TV Format Adaptation (Scripted) in Asia | —N/a | Silver | |
