= Kailangan Ko'y Ikaw (TV series) =

- Title card
- Also known as: All for Love
- Genre: Melodrama; Romance; Police procedural
- Created by: Rondel P. Lindayag
- Developed by: ABS-CBN Studios
- Written by: Rhoda Sulit
- Directed by: Bb. Joyce Bernal; Jon S. Villarin
- Starring: Anne Curtis; Kris Aquino; Robin Padilla
- Opening theme: "Kailangan Ko'y Ikaw" by Gary Valenciano/Angeline Quinto
- Composer: Ogie Alcasid
- Country of origin: Philippines
- Original language: Filipino
- No. of episodes: 63

Production
- Executive producers: Carlo Katigbak; Cory Vidanes; Laurenti Dyogi; Roldeo Endrinal
- Producer: Marissa Kalaw
- Running time: 30–35 minutes
- Production companies: Dreamscape Entertainment Television; K Productions; RCP Productions

Original release
- Network: ABS-CBN
- Release: January 21 – April 19, 2013

Kailangan Ko'y Ikaw (International title: All for Love / transl. I Need You) is a 2013 Philippine television drama series broadcast by ABS-CBN. Directed by Bb. Joyce Bernal and Jon S. Villarin, it stars Anne Curtis, Kris Aquino and Robin Padilla. It aired on the network's Primetime Bida line up and worldwide on TFC from January 21 to April 19, 2013, replacing A Beautiful Affair and was replaced by Missing You.

== Plot ==
Kailangan Ko’y Ikaw follows the story of Police Inspector Gregorio Dagohoy (Robin Padilla), a police investigator who accidentally meets the Manrique sisters; Ruth (Anne Curtis) and Roxanne (Kris Aquino) because of kidnapping incident. It happens that Ruth planned her own kidnapping and wanted to extort money from her family. Despite her being the black sheep in the family and pushing her passion to be a model, her sister Roxanne remained faithful to her. Gregorio became close to the two sisters that has a connection to a crime that his father became involved despite his innocence.

== Cast and characters ==
=== Main cast ===
- Anne Curtis as Ruth Manrique
- Kris Aquino as Roxanne Manrique-Dagohoy
- Robin Padilla as Gregorio "Bogs" Dagohoy

=== Supporting cast ===
- Xyriel Manabat as Cherish Dagohoy
- Tirso Cruz III as Rodrigo Manrique
- Gloria Sevilla as Esther Dagohoy
- Ian Veneracion as Redentor "Red" Manrique
- Karla Estrada as Apple Puno
- Miles Ocampo as Precious Dagohoy
- Marco Gumabao as Ian Velasquez

=== Guest cast ===
- Melissa Mendez as Dina Manrique
- Kevin Viard as Gunther Armansi
- Tetchie Agbayani as Luisa
- Efren Reyes Jr. as Ernesto Cruz
- Jeffrey Santos as Popoy Almonte
- Diane Medina as Sonia
- Troy Montero as Aldrich Matias
- Guji Lorenzana as Mario
- Nick Lizaso as Menandro Matias
- Pocholo Montes as Simon
- Matthew Padilla as Lawin
- Paolo Serrano as Mark
- Johnny Revilla as Don Leo
- Laureen Uy as Esmy
- Smokey Manaloto as Pogi Kho
- Emilio Garcia as Loro

=== Special participation ===
- Lito Pimentel as Nestor Dagohoy
- Daniel Padilla as young Bogs
- Trina Legaspi as young Roxanne
- Alexandra Macanan as young Ruth
- Carlo Lacana as teen Red

== See also ==
- List of programs broadcast by ABS-CBN
- List of ABS-CBN Studios original drama series
