= Amorosa (2012 film) =

Amorosa (The Revenge)
- Theatrical release poster
- Directed by: Topel Lee
- Screenplay by: Enrico C. Santos; Kren V. Yap; Willy Laconsay
- Story by: Enrico C. Santos; Joel M. Mercado
- Produced by: Charo Santos-Concio; Malou N. Santos; Enrico C. Santos
- Starring: Angel Aquino; Enrique Gil; Martin del Rosario
- Cinematography: Luis Quirino
- Edited by: Vanessa de Leon
- Music by: Carmina Cuya
- Production company: Skylight Films
- Distributed by: ABS-CBN Film Productions
- Release date: August 29, 2012
- Running time: 105 minutes
- Country: Philippines
- Language: Filipino
- Box office: ₱25,201,412.00

Amorosa (The Revenge) is a 2012 Filipino psychological horror drama film directed by Topel Lee and written by Enrico C. Santos, Kren V. Yap, and Willy Laconsay from a story developed by Santos and Joel Mercado. The film stars Angel Aquino, Enrique Gil, Martin del Rosario, and Xyriel Manabat in her first horror film.

Produced by Skylight Films and distributed by ABS-CBN Film Productions, the film was theatrically released on August 29, 2012.

== Synopsis ==
Years ago, Amorosa (Angel Aquino), her husband, and her two boys Amiel and Rommel (Martin del Rosario and Enrique Gil) got into a car accident. Her husband died in the accident, leaving her alone to take care of her boys. In the present, she decides to move her family to a remote pension house. But once there, she discovers that the house is home to an angry spirit seeking revenge for sins committed years ago. And as she deals with the fear of this spirit popping up everywhere, she struggles to reconnect with Rommel, who hasn’t been the same since the accident.

== Cast ==
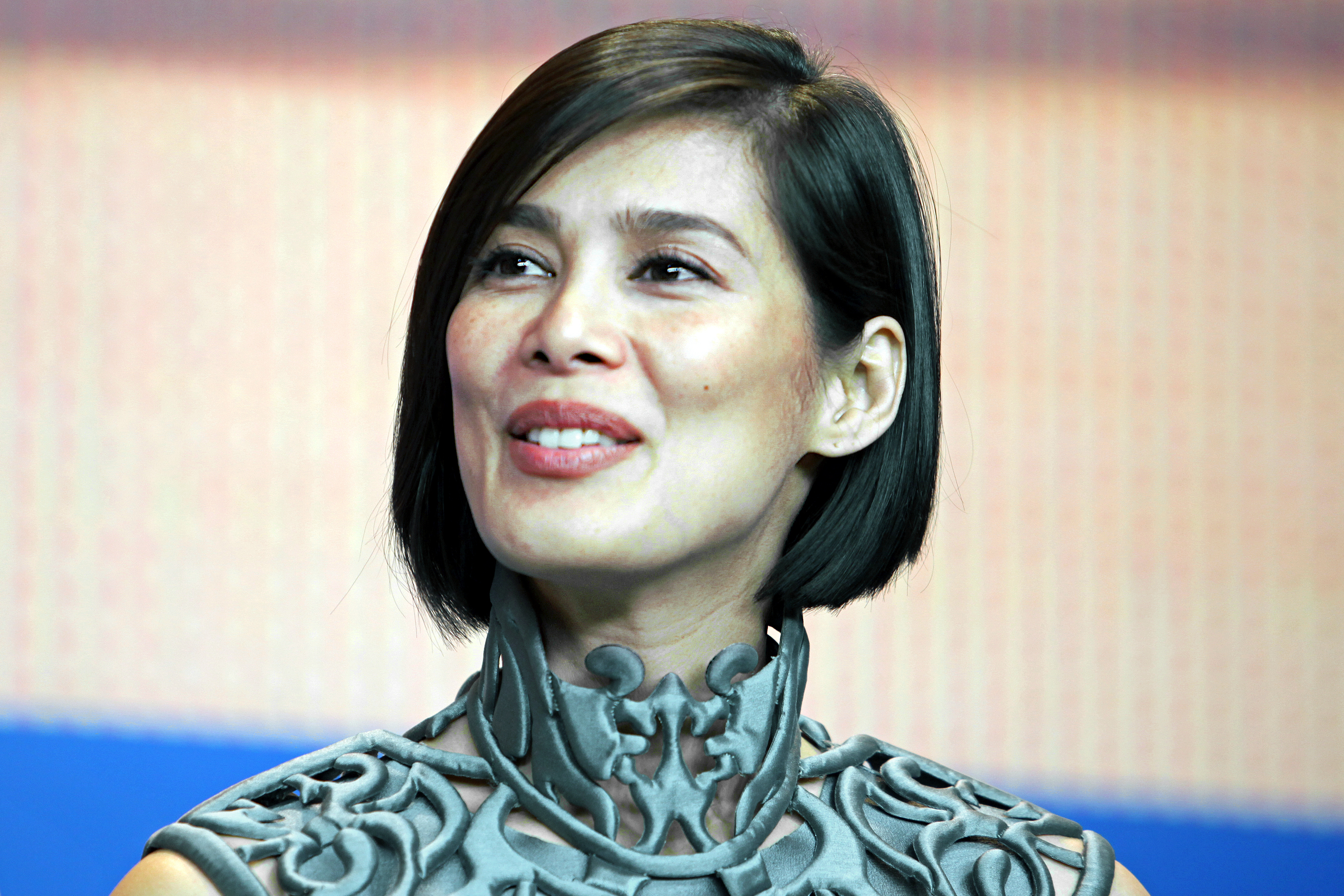
Angel Aquino portrays Rosa dela Cruz

Main cast

- Angel Aquino as Rosa
- Martin del Rosario as Amiel
- Enrique Gil as Rommel

Supporting cast

- Empress Schuck as Sandra
- Carlo Aquino as Jerry
- Ejay Falcon as William
- Jane Oineza as Amanda
- Xyriel Manabat as Nadia
- Richard Quan as Sgt. Villegas
- Franco Daza as Rudolf
- Nico Antonio as Glen
- Mosang as Florida
- Jairus Aquino as Jun
- Lemuel Pelayo as Carl
- Johan Santos as Bong
- Lloyd Samartino as Lito

Guest cast

- Alexa Ilacad as Young Ananda
- Isiah Ersty as Young Amiel
- Juljio Pisk as Young Rommel

== Reception ==
The film received R13 rating. The maindie film was released the same week with the musical film I Do Bidoo Bidoo. It earned an estimated P11,738,087 on its first five days well ahead of I Do Bidoo Bidoo. Amorosa grossed P25,201,412 in 2 weeks according to Box Office Mojo. It ranked 2nd Top Grossing Independent Film of 2012 and one of the 20 Top Grossing Filipino films of 2012.

== Nominations ==
- 29th Star Awards for Movies

-Indie Movie of the Year nominee
-Indie Movie Director of the Year nominee
-Indie Movie Screenwriter of the Year nominee

== See also ==
- List of ghost films
